= Archery at the 2017 SEA Games =

Archery competitions (Sport involving shooting arrows with a bow)

- Venue: National Sports Complex
- Location: Kuala Lumpur, Malaysia
- Date: 16–22 August
- Competitors: 110 from 8 nations

The archery competitions at the 2017 SEA Games in Kuala Lumpur took place at National Sports Complex, Malaysia in Kuala Lumpur.

The 2017 Games featured competitions in ten events (men 4 events, women 4 events, and mixed 2 events).

== Events ==
The following events were contested:

- Compound
  - Individual
  - Mixed
  - Team
- Recurve
  - Individual
  - Mixed
  - Team

== Competition schedule ==
| Q | Qualifications | K | Knockout stage | B | Bronze medal match | F | Final |

| Event↓/Date → | Wed 16 | | | | Thu 17 | | | Fri 18 | | | Sat 19 | Sun 20 | | | | Mon 21 | | | Tue 22 | | |
|---|---|---|---|---|---|---|---|---|---|---|---|---|---|---|---|---|---|---|---|---|---|
| Men's individual recurve | | | | | | | | | | | | Q | K | B | F | | | | | | |
| Men's team recurve | | | | | | | | | | | | | | | | K | B | F | | | |
| Women's individual recurve | | | | | | | | | | | | Q | K | B | F | | | | | | |
| Women's team recurve | | | | | | | | | | | | | | | | K | B | F | | | |
| Mixed team recurve | | | | | | | | | | | | | | | | | | | K | B | F |
| Men's individual compound | Q | K | B | F | | | | | | | | | | | | | | | | | |
| Men's team compound | | | | | K | B | F | | | | | | | | | | | | | | |
| Women's individual compound | Q | K | B | F | | | | | | | | | | | | | | | | | |
| Women's team compound | | | | | K | B | F | | | | | | | | | | | | | | |
| Mixed team compound | | | | | | | | K | B | F | | | | | | | | | | | |

== Participation ==
=== Participating nations ===
- Indonesia (16)
- Laos (8)
- Malaysia (16)
- Myanmar (14)
- Philippines (16)
- Singapore (9)
- Thailand (16)
- Vietnam (16)

== Medal summary ==
=== Medal table ===
* Host nation (Malaysia)

| Rank | Nation | Gold | Silver | Bronze | Total |
|---|---|---|---|---|---|
| 1 | Malaysia (MAS)* | 5 | 3 | 2 | 10 |
| 2 | Indonesia (INA) | 4 | 1 | 1 | 6 |
| 3 | Vietnam (VIE) | 1 | 2 | 2 | 5 |
| 4 | Philippines (PHI) | 0 | 1 | 4 | 5 |
| 5 | Thailand (THA) | 0 | 1 | 1 | 2 |
| 6 | Myanmar (MYA) | 0 | 1 | 0 | 1 |
| 6 | Singapore (SGP) | 0 | 1 | 0 | 1 |
| Totals (7 entries) | | 10 | 10 | 10 | 30 |

=== Recurve ===
| Event | Gold | Silver | Bronze |
|---|---|---|---|
| Men's individual | Chu Đức Anh; Vietnam | Khairul Anuar Mohamad; Malaysia | Witthaya Thamwong; Thailand |
| Women's individual | Diananda Choirunisa; Indonesia | Nicole Marie Tagle; Philippines | Nur Aliya Ghapar; Malaysia |
| Men's team | Malaysia; Haziq Kamaruddin; Khairul Anuar Mohamad; Muhammad Akmal Nor Hasrin | Thailand; Denchai Thepna; Natthapoom Phusawat; Witthaya Thamwong | Philippines; Florante Matan; Luis Gabriel Moreno; Mark Javier |
| Women's team | Malaysia; Nur Afisa Abdul Halil; Nur Aliya Ghapar; Nuramalia Haneesha Mazlan | Indonesia; Diananda Choirunisa; Linda Lestari; Titik Kusumawardani | Philippines; Kareel Meer Hongitan; Mary Queen Ybañez; Nicole Marie Tagle |
| Mixed team | Indonesia; Riau Ega Agatha; Diananda Choirunisa | Malaysia; Khairul Anuar Mohamad; Nur Aliya Ghapar | Vietnam; Chu Đức Anh; Lộc Thị Đào |

=== Compound ===
| Event | Gold | Silver | Bronze |
|---|---|---|---|
| Men's individual | Prima Wisnu Wardhana; Indonesia | Mohd Juwaidi Mazuki; Malaysia | Paul Marton Dela Cruz; Philippines |
| Women's individual | Sri Ranti; Indonesia | Châu Kiều Oanh; Vietnam | Fatin Nurfatehah Mat Salleh; Malaysia |
| Men's team | Malaysia; Lee Kin Lip; Mohd Juwaidi Mazuki; Zulfadli Ruslan | Singapore; Ang Han Teng; Alan Lee; Pang Toh Jin | Philippines; Earl Benjamin Yap; Joseph Vicencio; Paul Marton Dela Cruz |
| Women's team | Malaysia; Fatin Nurfatehah Mat Salleh; Saritha Cham Nong; Nurul Syazhera Mohd Asmi | Vietnam; Châu Kiều Oanh; Nguyễn Thị Nhật Lệ; Lê Ngọc Huyền | Indonesia; Dellie Threesyadinda; Triya Resky Adriya; Rona Siska Sari |
| Mixed team | Malaysia; Mohd Juwaidi Mazuki; Fatin Nurfatehah Mat Salleh | Myanmar; Ye Min Swe; Aung Ngeain | Vietnam; Nguyễn Tiến Cương; Châu Kiều Oanh |

== See also ==
- Archery at the 2017 ASEAN Para Games
