= Archery at the 2017 SEA Games – Results =

The archery competitions at the 2017 SEA Games in Kuala Lumpur took place at Merdeka Square in Kuala Lumpur.

The 2017 Games featured competitions in ten events (men 4 events, women 4 events and mixed 2 events ).

== Men's individual compound ==
Men's individual compound at the 2017 SEA Games
- Venue: Merdeka Square
- Date: 16 August 2017

Medalists
gold medal	Prima Wisnu Wardhana	Indonesia
silver medal	Mohd Juwaidi Mazuki	Malaysia
bronze medal	Paul Marton Dela Cruz	Philippines

=== Qualification round ===
Note: Two archers from each nation with higher score qualified for knockout round

Rank	Athlete	Score	10s	Xs
1	Prima Wisnu Wardhana (INA)	703	56	18
2	Paul Marton De La Cruz (PHI)	702	55	16
3	Mohd Juwaidi Mazuki (MAS)	700	54	21
4	Dhansarit Itsarangkun Na Ayutthaya (THA)	700	53	21
5	Zulfadhli Ruslan (MAS)	698	53	22
6	Lee Kin Lip (MAS)	697	49	16
7	Earl Benjamin Yap (PHI)	694	48	25
8	Ye Min Swe (MYA)	693	46	20
9	Nguyen Tien Cuong (VIE)	692	46	21
10	Nguyen Van Day (VIE)	692	45	16
11	Yoke Rizaldi Akbar (INA)	690	46	14
12	Ang Han Teng (SGP)	689	44	15
13	Joseph Benjamin Vicencio (PHI)	689	43	11
14	Khwanchai Phohiran (THA)	688	42	18
15	Nitiphum Chatachot (THA)	688	42	13
16	Khambeswaran Mohanraja (MAS)	687	44	9
17	Thach Phi Hung (VIE)	686	42	15
18	Lee Chung Hee Alan (SGP)	685	43	11
19	Daliya Saidara (LAO)	685	42	20
20	Pang Toh Jin (SGP)	684	39	14
21	Sapriatno (INA)	683	43	25
22	Garincha Didi Nugroho (INA)	681	39	15
23	Chanchai Pratheepwatanawong (THA)	681	37	19
24	Mai Xuan Duc (VIE)	676	34	11
25	Shein Htet Kyaw (MYA)	676	32	18
26	Zin Thu Rain Mhu (MYA)	673	32	13
27	Khamvarn Vanlivong (LAO)	663	26	10
28	Niron Brylle Concepcion (PHI)	661	30	12
29	Goh Hong Hui (SGP)	642	23	4
30	Myat Zaw Tun (MYA)	629	22	6
31	Siliphonth Thanonglith (LAO)	628	14	5

=== Knockout round ===
Round of 16
1	Prima Wisnu Wardhana (INA)	142
16	Khamvarn Vanlivong (LAO)	138
9	Nguyen Van Day (VIE)	141
8	Nguyen Tien Cuong (VIE)	138
5	Zulfadhli Ruslan (MAS)	148
12	Khwanchai Phohiran (THA)	141
13	Lee Chung Hee Alan (SGP)	144
4	Dhansarit Itsarangkun Na Ayutthaya (THA)	142
3	Mohd Juwaidi Mazuki (MAS)	144
14	Saidara Daliya (LAO)	138
11	Ang Han Teng (SGP)	144
6	Earl Benjamin Yap (SGP)	142
7	Ye Min Swe (MYA)	141
10	Yoke Rizaldi Akbar (INA)	144
15	Shein Htet Kyaw (MYA)	140
2	Paul Marton Dela Cruz (PHI)	145

Quarterfinals
Prima Wisnu Wardhana (INA)	147
Nguyen Van Day (VIE)	142
Zulfadhli Ruslan (MAS)	143
Lee Chung Hee Alan (SGP)	140
Mohd Juwaidi Mazuki (MAS)	148
Ang Han Teng (SGP)	143
Yoke Rizaldi Akbar (INA)	139
Paul Marton Dela Cruz (PHI)	144

Semifinals
Prima Wisnu Wardhana (INA)	144(10)
Zulfadhli Ruslan (MAS)	144(9)
Mohd Juwaidi Mazuki (MAS)	147
Paul Marton Dela Cruz (PHI)	140

Gold medal match
Prima Wisnu Wardhana (INA)	145
Mohd Juwaidi Mazuki (MAS)	144
Bronze medal match
5	Zulfadhli Ruslan (MAS)	144(9)
2	Paul Marton Dela Cruz (PHI)	144(10)

== Women's individual compound ==
Women's individual compound at the 2017 SEA Games
- Venue: Merdeka Square
- Date: 16 August 2017

Medalists
gold medal	Sri Ranti	Indonesia
silver medal	Chau Kieu Oanh	Vietnam
bronze medal	Fatin Nurfatehah Mat Salleh	Malaysia

=== Qualification round ===
Note: Two archers from each nation with higher score qualified for knockout round

Rank	Athlete	Score	10s	Xs
1	Fatin Nurfatehah Mat Salleh (MAS)	696	30	19
2	Kanyavee Maneesombatkul (THA)	695	30	19
3	Amaya Amparo Cojuangco (PHI)	695	28	20
4	Aung Ngeain (MYA)	692	32	15
5	Châu Kieu Oanh (VIE)	691	27	19
6	Dellie Threesyadinda (INA)	687	26	18
7	Sri Ranti (INA)	684	29	11
8	Saritha Cham Nong (MAS)	682	14	21
9	Nguyen Thi Nhat Le (VIE)	680	18	20
10	Huyen Le Ngoc (VIE)	680	17	18
11	Rona Siska Sari (INA)	677	20	18
12	Triya Resky Adriyani (INA)	675	26	9
13	Nurul Syazhera Mohd Asmi (MAS)	675	19	13
14	Jennifer Chan (PHI)	674	22	6
15	Suvaporn Anutaraporn (THA)	673	22	12
16	Nguyen Thi Thanh Thao (VIE)	673	21	12
17	Nor Rizah Ishak (MAS)	671	25	14
18	Hlaing Su Su (MYA)	670	23	10
19	Phone Kamkeo (LAO)	664	18	12
20	Yaw Sein Yah (MYA)	664	20	9
21	Madeleine Ong Xue Li (SGP)	663	17	12
22	Abbigail Tindugan (PHI)	661	22	10
23	Nareumon Junsook (THA)	660	21	9
24	Christina Gunawan (SGP)	660	17	9
25	Hla Hla San (MYA)	656	18	10
26	Sunee Detchokul (THA)	654	19	5
27	Kim Concepcion (PHI)	638	16	8
28	Low Luan Eng (SGP)	623	12	1

=== Knockout round ===
Round of 16
1
16
9	Thi Nhat Le Nguyen (VIE)	136
8	Saritha Cham Nong (MAS)	139
5	Chau Kieu Oanh (VIE)	139
12	Su Su Hlaing (MYA)	134
13	Kamkeo Phone (LAO)	133
4	Aung Ngeain (MYA)	145
3	Amaya Amparo Cojuangco (PHI)	142
14	Madeleine Ong Xue Li (SGP)	132
11	Suvaporn Anutaraporn (THA)	133
6	Dellie Threesyadinda (INA)	139
7	Sri Ranti (INA)	141
10	Jennifer Chan (PHI)	136
15	Christina Gunawan (SGP)	137
2	Kanyavee Maneesombatkul (THA)	136

Quarterfinals
Fatin Nurfatehah Mat Salleh (MAS)	144
Saritha Cham Nong (MAS)	138
Chau Kieu Oanh (VIE)	144
Aung Ngeain (MYA)	141
Amaya Amparo Cojuangco (PHI)	137
Dellie Threesyadinda (INA)	141
Sri Ranti (INA)	138
Christina Gunawan (SGP)	136

Semifinals
Fatin Nurfatehah Mat Salleh (MAS)	142
Chau Kieu Oanh (VIE)	145
Dellie Threesyadinda (INA)	136
Sri Ranti (INA)	141

Gold medal match
Chau Kieu Oanh (VIE)	143
Sri Ranti (INA)	144
Bronze medal match
1	Fatin Nurfatehah Mat Salleh (MAS)	143
6	Dellie Threesyadinda (INA)	141

== Men's team compound ==
Men's team compound at the 2017 SEA Games
- Venue: Merdeka Square
- Date: August 2017

Medalists
gold medal	Lee Kin Lip; Mohd Juwaidi Mazuki; Zulfadhli Ruslan	Malaysia
silver medal	Ang Han Teng; Lee Chung Hee Alan; Pang Toh Jin	Singapore
bronze medal	Earl Benjamin Yap; Joseph Benjamin Vicencio; Paul Marton Dela Cruz	Philippines

=== Seeding round ===
Rank	Country	Athlete	Score	10s	Xs
1	Malaysia (MAS)	Lee Kin Lip; Mohd Juwaidi Mazuki; Zulfadhli Ruslan	2095	107	59
2	Philippines (PHI)	Earl Benjamin Yap; Joseph Benjamin Vicencio; Paul Marton Dela Cruz	2085	94	52
3	Indonesia (INA)	Prima Wisnu Wardhana; Sapriatno; Yoke Rizaldi Akbar	2076	88	57
4	Thailand (THA)	Dhansarit Itsarangkun Na Ayutthaya; Khwanchai Phohiran; Nitiphum Chatachot	2076	85	52
5	Vietnam (VIE)	Hung Thach Phi; Nguyen Tien Cuong; Nguyen Van Day	2070	81	52
6	Singapore (SGP)	Ang Han Teng; Lee Chung Hee Alan; Pang Toh Jin	2058	86	40
7	Myanmar (MYA)	Shein Htet Kyaw; Ye Min Swe; Zin Thu Rain Mhu	2042	59	51
8	Laos (LAO)	Saidara Daliya; Siliphonth Thanonglith; Khamvarn Vanlivong	1976	47	35

=== Knockout round ===
Quarterfinals
1	Malaysia (MAS)	234
8	Laos (LAO)	205
5	Vietnam (VIE)	229
4	Thailand (THA)	228
3	Indonesia (INA)	225
6	Singapore (SGP)	226
7	Myanmar (MYA)	214
2	Philippines (PHI)	236

Semifinals
1	Malaysia (MAS)	227(29)
5	Vietnam (VIE)	227(27)
6	Singapore (SGP)	233
2	Philippines (PHI)	227

Gold medal match
1	Malaysia (MAS)	228
6	Singapore (SGP)	222
Bronze medal match
5	Vietnam (VIE)	230
2	Philippines (PHI)	233

== Women's team compound ==
Women's team compound at the 2017 SEA Games
- Venue: Merdeka Square
- Date: 17 August 2017

Medalists
gold medal	Fatin Nurfatehah Mat Salleh; Nurul Syazhera Mohd Asmi; Saritha Cham Nong	Malaysia
silver medal	Chau Kieu Oanh; Huyen Le Ngoc; Nguyen Thi Nhat Le	Vietnam
bronze medal	Dellie Trisyadinda; Rona Siska Sari; Sri Ranti	Indonesia

=== Seeding round ===
Rank	Country	Athlete	Score	10s	Xs
1	Malaysia (MAS)	Fatin Nurfatehah Mat Salleh; Nurul Syazhera Mohd Asmi; Saritha Cham Nong	2053	63	53
2	Vietnam (VIE)	Chau Kieu Oanh; Huyen Le Ngoc; Nguyen Thi Nhat Le	2051	62	57
3	Indonesia (INA)	Dellie Trisyadinda; Rona Siska Sari; Sri Ranti	2048	75	47
4	Philippines (PHI)	Abbigail Tindugan; Amaya Amparo Cojuangco; Jennifer Chan	2030	72	36
5	Thailand (THA)	Kanyavee Maneesombatkul; Nareumon Junsook; Suvaporn Anutaraporn	2028	73	40
6	Myanmar (MYA)	Aung Ngeain; Su Su Hlaing; Yaw Sein Yah	2026	75	34
7	Singapore (SGP)	Christina Gunawan; Low Luan Eng; Madeleine Ong Xue Li	1946	46	22

=== Knockout round ===
Quarterfinals
5	Thailand (THA)	222
4	Philippines (PHI)	215
3	Indonesia (INA)	226
6	Myanmar (MYA)	225
7	Singapore (SGP)	211
2	Vietnam (VIE)	226

Semifinals
1	Malaysia (MAS)	227
5	Thailand (THA)	219
3	Indonesia (INA)	221
2	Vietnam (VIE)	228

Gold medal match
1	Malaysia (MAS)	225(28)
2	Vietnam (VIE)	225(27)
Bronze medal match
5	Thailand (THA)	222
3	Indonesia (INA)	225

== Mixed team compound ==
Mixed team compound at the 2017 SEA Games
- Venue: Merdeka Square
- Date: August 2017

Medalists
gold medal	Mohd Juwaidi Mazuki; Fatin Nurfatehah Mat Salleh	Malaysia
silver medal	Ye Min Swe; Aung Ngeain	Myanmar
bronze medal	Nguyen Tien Cuong; Chau Kieu Oanh	Vietnam

=== Seeding round ===
Rank	Country	Athlete	Score	10s	Xs
1	Philippines (PHI)	Paul Marton Dela Cruz; Amaya Amparo Cojuangco	1397	103	36
2	Malaysia (MAS)	Mohd Juwaidi Mazuki; Fatin Nurfatehah Mat Salleh	1396	103	40
3	Thailand (THA)	Dhansarit Itsarangkun Na Ayutthaya; Kanyavee Maneesombatkul	1395	102	40
4	Indonesia (INA)	Prima Wisnu Wardhana; Dellie Trisyadinda	1390	100	36
5	Myanmar (MYA)	Ye Min Swe; Aung Ngeain	1385	93	35
6	Vietnam (VIE)	Nguyen Tien Cuong; Chau Kieu Oanh	1383	92	40
7	Singapore (SGP)	Ang Han Teng; Madeleine Ong Xue Li	1352	73	27
8	Laos (LAO)	Saidara Daliya; Phone Kamkeo	1349	72	32

=== Knockout round ===
Quarterfinals
1	Philippines (PHI)	156
8	Laos (LAO)	150
5	Myanmar (MYA)	154
4	Indonesia (INA)	153
3	Thailand (THA)	154
6	Vietnam (VIE)	156
7	Singapore (SGP)	149
2	Malaysia (MAS)	155

Semifinals
1	Philippines (PHI)	154(18)
5	Myanmar (MYA)	154(18*)
6	Vietnam (VIE)	152
2	Malaysia (MAS)	154

Gold medal match
5	Myanmar (MYA)	142
2	Malaysia (MAS)	152
Bronze medal match
1	Philippines (PHI)	155
6	Vietnam (VIE)	159

== Men's individual recurve ==
Men's individual recurve at the 2017 SEA Games
- Venue: Merdeka Square
- Date: August 2017

Medalists
gold medal	Chu Đức Anh	Vietnam
silver medal	Khairul Anuar Mohamad	Malaysia
bronze medal	Witthaya Thamwong	Thailand

=== Ranking round ===
Rank	Athlete	Score	10s	Xs
1	Khairul Anuar Mohamad (MAS)	682	38	9
2	Akmal Nor Hasrin (MAS)	671	33	14
3	Chu Đức Anh (VIE)	658	22	12
4	Witthaya Thamwong (THA)	657	27	8
5	Tan Si Lie (SGP)	654	26	10
6	Riau Ega Agatha (INA)	653	24	9
7	Natthapoom Phusawat (THA)	643	26	12
8	Van Duy Nguyen (VIE)	642	21	10
9	Florante F. Matan (PHI)	641	21	6
10	Luis Gabriel Moreno (PHI)	639	24	9
11	Lin Oo Htike (MYA)	636	19	3
12	Hendra Purnama (INA)	635	19	7
13	Oo Lin Nay (MYA)	635	16	6
14	Ng Justin Wei Qing (SGP)	634	20	5
15	Soulivong Onmanee (LAO)	600	13	6
16	Thongxay Sivilay (LAO)	584	11	3

=== Knockout round ===
==== Finals ====
Semifinals
1	Khairul Anuar Mohamad (MAS)	7
4	Witthaya Thamwong (THA)	3
3	Chu Đức Anh (VIE)	6
2	Akmal Nor Hasrin (MAS)	2

Finals
1	Khairul Anuar Mohamad (MAS) (silver)	2
3	Chu Đức Anh (VIE) (gold)	6
Third place
4	Witthaya Thamwong (THA) (bronze)	6
2	Akmal Nor Hasrin (MAS)	2

==== Section 1 ====
1/8 eliminations		Quarterfinals		Semifinals
Khairul Anuar Mohamad (MAS)	6
Thongxay Sivilay (LAO)	0	Khairul Anuar Mohamad (MAS)	6
Florante F. Matan (PHI)	6	Florante F. Matan (PHI)	2
Van Duy Nguyen (VIE)	4			Khairul Anuar Mohamad (MAS)	7
Tan Si Lie (SGP)	2			Witthaya Thamwong (THA)	3
Hendra Purnama (INA)	6	Hendra Purnama (INA)	1
Nay Lin Oo (MYA)	2	Witthaya Thamwong (THA)	7
Witthaya Thamwong (THA)	6

==== Section 2 ====
1/8 eliminations		Quarterfinals		Semifinals
Chu Đức Anh (VIE)	7
Ng Justin Wei Qing (SGP)	3	Chu Đức Anh (VIE)	6
Lin Oo Htike (MYA)	7	Lin Oo Htike (MYA)	2
Riau Ega Agatha (INA)	3			Chu Đức Anh (VIE)	6
Natthapoom Phusawat (THA)	0			Akmal Nor Hasrin (MAS)	2
Luis Gabriel Moreno (PHI)	6	Luis Gabriel Moreno (PHI)	3
Soulivong Onmanee (LAO)	2	Akmal Nor Hasrin (MAS)	7
Akmal Nor Hasrin (MAS)	6

== Women's individual recurve ==
Women's individual recurve at the 2017 SEA Games
- Venue: Merdeka Square
- Date: August 2017
- Competitors: 12 from 11 nations

Medalists
gold medal	Diananda Choirunisa	Indonesia
silver medal	Nicole Marie Tagle	Philippines
bronze medal	Nur Aliya Ghapar	Malaysia

=== Ranking round ===
Rank	Athlete	Score	10s	Xs
1	Diananda Choirunisa (INA)	650	27	9
2	Nicole Marie Tagle (PHI)	643	17	6
3	Nguyen Thi Phuong (VIE)	642	17	9
4	Nur Aliya Ghapar (MAS)	632	19	3
5	Nur Afisa Abdul Halil (MAS)	631	23	7
6	Titik Kusumawardani (INA)	631	17	3
7	Loc Thi Dao (VIE)	624	21	5
8	Kareel Meer Hongitan (PHI)	623	14	4
9	Waraporn Phutdee (THA)	623	11	3
10	Win Zar Khyi (MYA)	608	16	6
11	Nwe Thida (MYA)	605	18	6
12	Sukanya Buayen (THA)	585	10	0
13	Jen Kabovsky (LAO)	535	7	3

=== Knockout round ===
==== Finals ====
Semifinals
1	Diananda Choirunisa (INA)	6
4	Nur Aliya Ghapar (MAS)	2
11	Nwe Thida (MYA)	2
2	Nicole Marie Tagle (PHI)	6

Finals
1	(gold) Diananda Choirunisa (INA)	6
2	(silver) Nicole Marie Tagle (PHI)	4
Third place
4	(bronze) Nur Aliya Ghapar (MAS)	6
11	Nwe Thida (MYA)	0

==== Section 1 ====
1/8 eliminations		Quarterfinals		Semifinals
		Diananda Choirunisa (INA)	6
Waraporn Phutdee (THA)	6	Waraporn Phutdee (THA)	2
Kareel Meer Hongitan (PHI)	2			Diananda Choirunisa (INA)	6
Nur Afisa Abdul Halil (MAS)	6			Nur Aliya Ghapar (MAS)	2
Sukanya Buayen (THA)	2	Nur Afisa Abdul Halil (MAS)	2
Jen Kabovsky (LAO)	0	Nur Aliya Ghapar (MAS)	6
Nur Aliya Ghapar (MAS)	6

==== Section 2 ====
1/8 eliminations		Quarterfinals		Semifinals
		Nguyen Thi Phuong (VIE)	2
Nwe Thida (MYA)	6	Nwe Thida (MYA)	6
Titik Kusumawardani (INA)	0			Nwe Thida (MYA)	2
Loc Thi Dao (VIE)	6			Nicole Marie Tagle (PHI)	6
Win Zar Khyi (MYA)	2	Loc Thi Dao (VIE)	2
		Nicole Marie Tagle (PHI)	6

== Men's team recurve ==
Men's team recurve at the 2017 SEA Games
- Venue: Merdeka Square
- Date: August 2017

Medalists
gold medal	Haziq Kamaruddin; Khairul Anuar Mohamad; Akmal Nor Hasrin	Malaysia
silver medal	Denchai Thepna; Natthapoom Phusawat; Witthaya Thamwong	Thailand
bronze medal	Florante F. Matan; Luis Gabriel Moreno; Mark Javier	Philippines

=== Ranking round ===
Rank	Country	Athlete	Score	10s	Xs
1	Malaysia (MAS)	Haziq Kamaruddin; Khairul Anuar Mohamad; Akmal Nor Hasrin	2009	96	26
2	Vietnam (VIE)	Chu Đức Anh; Hoang Van Loc; Van Duy Nguyen	1940	61	29
3	Thailand (THA)	Denchai Thepna; Natthapoom Phusawat; Witthaya Thamwong	1932	68	24
4	Philippines (PHI)	Florante F. Matan; Luis Gabriel Moreno; Mark Javier	1914	60	20
5	Indonesia (INA)	Hendra Purnama; Muhammad Wijaya; Riau Ega Agatha	1909	57	21
6	Myanmar (MYA)	Htike Lin Oo; Nay Lin Oo; Si Thu Nyein	1882	41	11
7	Laos (LAO)	Khampheng Inthavong; Soulivong Onmanee; Thongxay Sivilay	1713	29	10

=== Knockout round ===
==== Finals ====
Semifinals
1	Malaysia (MAS)	6
4	Philippines (PHI)	0
3	Thailand (THA)	5
2	Vietnam (VIE)	4

Finals
1	(gold) Malaysia (MAS)	5
3	(silver) Thailand (THA)	1
Third place
4	(bronze) Philippines (PHI)	6
2	Vietnam (VIE)	0

==== Section 1 ====
1/4 eliminations			Semifinal
			1	Malaysia (MAS)	6
5	Indonesia (INA)	3	4	Philippines (PHI)	0
4	Philippines (PHI)	5

==== Section 2 ====
1/4 eliminations			Semifinal
3	Thailand (THA)	6
6	Myanmar (MYA)	0	3	Thailand (THA)	5
7	Laos (LAO)	0	2	Vietnam (VIE)	4
2	Vietnam (VIE)	6

== Women's team recurve ==
Women's team recurve at the 2017 SEA Games
- Venue: Merdeka Square
- Date: August 2017

Medalists
gold medal	Nur Afisa Abdul Halil; Nur Aliya Ghapar; Nuramalia Haneesha Mazlan	Malaysia
silver medal	Diananda Choirunisa; Linda Lestari; Titik Wardani	Indonesia
bronze medal	Kareel Meer Hongitan; Mary Queen Ybañez; Nicole Marie Tagle	Philippines

=== Ranking round ===
Rank	Country	Athlete	Score	10s	Xs
1	Indonesia (INA)	Diananda Choirunisa; Linda Lestari; Titik Wardani	1909	58	15
2	Vietnam (VIE)	Le Thi Thu Hien; Loc Thi Dao; Nguyen Thi Phuong	1889	54	15
3	Malaysia (MAS)	Nur Afisa Abdul Halil; Nur Aliya Ghapar; Nuramalia Haneesha Mazlan	1884	52	16
4	Philippines (PHI)	Kareel Meer Hongitan; Mary Queen Ybañez; Nicole Marie Tagle	1867	43	12
5	Myanmar (MYA)	San Yu Htwe; Thida Nwe; Win Zar Khyi	1802	45	16
6	Thailand (THA)	Pattanodome Ruthaiporn; Sukanya Buayen; Waraporn Phutdee	1761	32	7

=== Knockout round ===
==== Finals ====
Semifinals
1	Indonesia (INA)	6
4	Philippines (PHI)	2
3	Malaysia (MAS)	6
2	Vietnam (VIE)	2

Finals
1	(silver) Indonesia (INA)	1
3	(gold) Malaysia (MAS)	5
Third place
4	(bronze) Philippines (PHI)	6
2	Vietnam (VIE)	0

==== Section 1 ====
1/4 eliminations			Semifinal
			1	Indonesia (INA)	6
5	Myanmar (MYA)	4	4	Philippines (PHI)	2
4	Philippines (PHI)	5

==== Section 2 ====
1/4 eliminations			Semifinal
3	Malaysia (MAS)	6
6	Thailand (THA)	0	3	Malaysia (MAS)	6
			2	Vietnam (VIE)	2

== Mixed team recurve ==
Mixed team recurve at the 2017 SEA Games
- Venue: Merdeka Square
- Date: August 2017

Medalists
gold medal	Diananda Choirunisa; Riau Ega Agatha	Indonesia
silver medal	Khairul Anuar Mohamad; Nur Aliya Ghapar	Malaysia
bronze medal	Chu Đức Anh; Nguyen Thi Phuong	Vietnam

=== Ranking round ===
Rank	Country	Athlete	Score	10s	Xs
1	Malaysia (MAS)	Khairul Anuar Mohamad; Nur Aliya Ghapar	1314	57	12
2	Indonesia (INA)	Diananda Choirunisa; Riau Ega Agatha	1303	51	18
3	Vietnam (VIE)	Chu Đức Anh; Nguyen Thi Phuong	1300	39	21
4	Philippines (PHI)	Florante F. Matan; Nicole Marie Tagle	1284	37	12
5	Thailand (THA)	Waraporn Phutdee; Witthaya Thamwong	1280	38	11
6	Myanmar (MYA)	Htike Lin Oo; Win Zar Khyi	1244	35	9
7	Laos (LAO)	Jen Kabovsky; Soulivong Onmanee	1135	20	9

=== Knockout round ===
==== Finals ====
Semifinals
1	Malaysia (MAS)	5
4	Philippines (PHI)	4
3	Vietnam (VIE)	0
2	Indonesia (INA)	6

Finals
1	(silver) Malaysia (MAS)	3
2	(gold) Indonesia (INA)	5
Third place
4	Philippines (PHI)	2
3	(bronze) Vietnam (VIE)	6

==== Section 1 ====
1/4 eliminations			Semifinal
			1	Malaysia (MAS)	5
5	Thailand (THA)	3	4	Philippines (PHI)	4
4	Philippines (PHI)	5

==== Section 2 ====
1/4 eliminations			Semifinal
3	Vietnam (VIE)	6
6	Myanmar (MYA)	0	3	Vietnam (VIE)	0
7	Laos (LAO)	0	2	Indonesia (INA)	6
2	Indonesia (INA)	6
