= Archery at the 2013 SEA Games =

- Venue: Wunna Theikdi Archery Field
- Dates: 12–17 December 2013

Archery at the 2013 SEA Games were held between December 12–17. Ten events took place, all being staged at Wunna Theikdi Archery Field.

== Medal table ==
* Host nation (Myanmar)

Rank	Nation	Gold	Silver	Bronze	Total
1	Malaysia	2	3	1	6
2	Indonesia	2	2	3	7
3	Vietnam	2	1	0	3
4	Singapore	1	1	0	2
5	Myanmar*	1	0	3	4
6	Philippines	1	0	1	2
7	Laos	1	0	0	1
8	Thailand	0	3	2	5
Totals (8 entries)		10	10	10	30

== Medal summary ==
=== Recurve ===
Event	Gold	Silver	Bronze
Men's individual	Khairul Anuar Mohamad; Malaysia	Atiq Bazil Bakri; Malaysia	Witthaya Thamwong; Thailand
Women's individual	Chan Jing Ru; Singapore	Titik Kusumawardani; Indonesia	Ika Yuliana Rochmawati; Indonesia
Men's team	Malaysia; Khairul Anuar Mohamad; Atiq Bazil Bakri; Haziq Kamaruddin	Thailand; Denchai Thepna; Khomkrit Duangsuwan; Witthaya Thamwong	Indonesia; Johan Prasetyo Adie Wibowo; Alek Edwar; Riau Ega Agatha
Women's team	Indonesia; Titik Kusumawardani; Diananda Choirunisa; Ika Yuliana Rochmawati	Vietnam; Nguyễn Thị Quyền Trang; Dương Thị Kim Lien; Lộc Thị Đào	Myanmar; Thazin Aung; San Yu Htwe; Thin Thin Khine
Mixed team	Vietnam; Lộc Thị Đào; Đào Trọng Kiên	Singapore; Tan Si Lie; Chan Jing Ru	Indonesia; Riau Ega Agatha; Ika Yuliana Rochmawati

=== Compound ===
Event	Gold	Silver	Bronze
Men's individual	Nguyễn Tiến Cương; Vietnam	Nitiphum Chatachot; Thailand	Earl Benjamin Yap; Philippines
Women's individual	Aung Ngeain; Myanmar	Dellie Threesyadinda; Indonesia	Saritha Cham Nong; Malaysia
Men's team	Philippines; Earl Benjamin Yap; Ian Patrick Chipeco; Delfin Anthony Adriano	Malaysia; Mohd Juwaidi Mazuki; Muhammad Zaki Mahazan; Mohd Kaharuddin Ashah	Thailand; Chanchai Pratheepwatanawong; Siripong Fakkeaw; Nitiphum Chatachot
Women's team	Indonesia; Rona Siska Sari; Sri Ranti; Dellie Threesyadinda	Thailand; Suvaporn Anutaraporn; Nareumon Junsook; Rungtiwa Tongkhaw	Myanmar; Yaw Sein Yah; Aye Aye Thin; Aung Ngeain
Mixed team	Laos; Khamvarn Vanlivong; Phone Kamkeo	Malaysia; Muhammad Zaki Mahazan; Saritha Cham Nong	Myanmar; Shein Htet Kyaw; Aung Ngeain

== Results ==
=== Men's ===
==== Individual compound ====
===== Qualification round =====
December 14

Rank	Athlete	Score	10s	Xs
1	Nguyen Tien Cuong (VIE)	699	52	23
2	Earl Benjamin Yap (PHI)	694	47	19
3	Muhammad Zaki Mahazam (MAS)	694	47	18
4	Chan Chai Pratheepwatanawong (THA)	688	42	19
5	Delfin Anthony Adriano (PHI)	684	43	22
6	Nitiphum Chatachot (THA)	684	39	17
7	Mohd Juwaidi Mazuki (MAS)	683	46	17
8	Mohd Kaharuddin Ashah (MAS)	683	40	14
9	Yanu Ardianto (INA)	682	36	13
10	Catur Wuri Adi Nugroho (INA)	681	40	18
11	Ian Patrick Chipeco (PHI)	679	37	11
12	Nguyễn Tuấn Anh (VIE)	678	37	14
13	Siripong Fakkeaw (THA)	677	39	14
14	Nguyen Thanh Tuan (VIE)	675	34	13
15	Vu Viet Anh (VIE)	673	36	13
16	Enaspin Purba (INA)	673	36	10
17	I Gusti Nyoman Puruhito (INA)	673	32	8
18	Shein Htet Kyaw (MYA)	671	31	10
19	Siwarut Wonglerustsuwan (THA)	669	30	12
20	Jose Ferdinand Adriano (PHI)	669	30	4
21	Lee Kin Lip (MAS)	668	31	3
22	Pang Toh Jin (SIN)	664	30	9
23	Khamvarn Vanlivong (LAO)	653	20	4
24	Lin Naing (MYA)	651	22	8
25	Sai Zin Min Htet (MYA)	647	21	5
26	Daliya Saidara (LAO)	646	23	8
27	Thanonglith Siriphonh (LAO)	646	23	8
28	Aung Chaint Baw (MYA)	575	12	0

===== Knockout round =====
December 15

1/8 eliminations
Nguyen Tien Cuong (VIE)
Bye
C Wuri Adi Nugroho (INA)
Yanu Ardianto (INA)
Delfin Anthony Adriano (PHI)	142
Pang Toh Jin (SIN)	141
Khamvarn Vanlivong (LAO)	135
Chan Chai P (THA)	142
3	M Zaki Mahazam (MAS)	143
14	Lin Naing (MYA)	132
11	Shein Htet Kyaw (MYA)	133
6	Nitiphum Chatachot (THA)	139
7	Mohd Juwaidi Mazuki (MAS)	139
10	Nguyễn Tuấn Anh (VIE)	138
15	Daliya Saidara (LAO)	130
2	Earl Benjamin Yap (PHI)	142

1/4 eliminations
1	Nguyen Tien Cuong (VIE)	143
9	C Wuri Adi Nugroho (INA)	141
5	Delfin Anthony Adriano (PHI)	142
4	Chan Chai P (THA)	139
3	M Zaki Mahazam (MAS)	143
6	Nitiphum Chatachot (THA)	145
7	Mohd Juwaidi Mazuki (MAS)	143
2	Earl Benjamin Yap (PHI)	147

Semifinal
1	Nguyen Tien Cuong (VIE)	146
5	Delfin Anthony Adriano (PHI)	145
6	Nitiphum Chatachot (THA)	142
2	Earl Benjamin Yap (PHI)	141

Gold medal match
1	Nguyen Tien Cuong (VIE)	138
6	Nitiphum Chatachot (THA)	136
Bronze medal match
5	Delfin Anthony Adriano (PHI)	143
2	Earl Benjamin Yap (PHI)	143

==== Team compound ====
===== Qualification round =====
December 14

Rank	Team	Score	10s	Xs
1	Malaysia (MAS)	2060	133	49
2	Philippines (PHI)	2057	127	52
3	Vietnam (VIE)	2052	123	50
4	Thailand (THA)	2049	120	50
5	Indonesia (INA)	2036	112	41
6	Myanmar (MYA)	1969	74	23
7	Laos (LAO)	1945	66	20

===== Knockout round =====
December 17

1/4 eliminations
1	Malaysia (MAS)
Bye
5	Indonesia (INA)	210
4	Thailand (THA)	218
3	Vietnam (VIE)	211
6	Myanmar (MYA)	213
7	Laos (LAO)
2	Philippines (PHI)

Semifinal
1	Malaysia (MAS)	226
4	Thailand (THA)	225
6	Myanmar (MYA)	205
2	Philippines (PHI)	223

Gold medal match
1	Malaysia (MAS)	218
2	Philippines (PHI)	221
Bronze medal match
4	Thailand (THA)	219
6	Myanmar (MYA)	213

==== Individual recurve ====
===== Qualification round =====
December 14

Rank	Athlete	Score	10s	Xs
1	Khairul Anuar Mohamad (MAS)	668	28	11
2	Riau Ega Agatha Salsabilla (INA)	657	26	11
3	Atiq Bazil Bakri (MAS)	655	23	5
4	Witthaya Tham Wong (THA)	652	22	8
5	Nay Myo Aung (MYA)	651	26	9
6	Khomkrit Duangsuwan (THA)	650	20	6
7	Denchai Thepna (THA)	647	20	5
8	Tan Si Lie (SIN)	645	20	10
9	Haziq Kamaruddin (MAS)	645	17	1
10	Itsarin Thaiuea (THA)	644	21	6
11	Zaw Win Htike (MYA)	639	24	6
12	Dao Trong Kien (VIE)	639	23	6
13	Le Dai Cuong (VIE)	637	22	5
14	Alek Edwar (INA)	632	19	8
15	Johan Prasetyo Adie Wibowo (INA)	628	19	3
16	Aung Myo Thu (MYA)	609	16	6
17	Nguyen Thanh Binh (VIE)	596	14	5
18	Muhamad Fareez Rosli (MAS)	595	16	3
19	Nyein Sithu (MYA)	595	4	2
20	Khampheng Inthavong (LAO)	580	13	4
21	Nguyen Huu Huy (VIE)	558	10	4

===== Knockout round =====
December 15

Round of 16
1	Mohamad (MAS)
Bye
9	D Trong Kien (VIE)	0	0	2	2	0
8	Z Win Htike (MYA)	2	2	0	0	2
5	N Myo Aung (MYA)	2	2	2
12	K Inthavong (LAO)	0	0	0
Bye
4	WT Wong (THA)
3	AB Bakri (MAS)
Bye
11	Alek Edwar (INA)	2	0	2	2
6	Duangsuwa (THA)	0	2	0	0
7	Tan Si Lie (SIN)	0	2	0	2	1	0
10	LD Cuong (VIE)	2	0	2	0	1	1
Bye
2	R Salsabilla (INA)

Quarter-finals
1	Mohamad (MAS)	1	2	2	2
8	Z Win Htike (MYA)	1	0	0	0
5	N Myo Aung (MYA)	0	0	2	2	0
4	WT Wong (THA)	2	2	0	0	2
3	AB Bakri (MAS)	2	2	2
11	Alek Edwar (INA)	0	0	0
10	LD Cuong (VIE)	0	0	1	0
2	R Salsabilla (INA)	2	2	1	2

Semifinal
1	Mohamad (MAS)	1	2	2	2
4	WT Wong (THA)	1	0	0	0
3	AB Bakri (MAS)	2	2	2
2	R Salsabilla (INA)	0	0	0

Gold medal match
1	Mohamad (MAS)	2	1	2	2
3	AB Bakri (MAS)	0	1	0	0
Bronze medal match
4	WT Wong (THA)	2	1	0	2	2
2	R Salsabilla (INA)	0	1	2	0	0

==== Team recurve ====
===== Qualification round =====
December 14

Rank	Team	Score	10s	Xs
1	Malaysia (MAS)	1968	68	14
2	Thailand (THA)	1949	62	19
3	Indonesia (INA)	1917	64	22
4	Myanmar (MYA)	1899	66	21
5	Vietnam (VIE)	1872	59	16

===== Knockout round =====
December 17

1/4 eliminations
1	Malaysia (MAS)
Bye
5	Vietnam (VIE)	193
4	Myanmar (MYA)	195
3	Indonesia (INA)
Bye
Bye
2	Thailand (THA)

Semifinal
1	Malaysia (MAS)	216
4	Myanmar (MYA)	206
3	Indonesia (INA)	199
2	Thailand (THA)	214

Gold medal match
1	Malaysia (MAS)	213
2	Thailand (THA)	212
Bronze medal match
4	Myanmar (MYA)	198
3	Indonesia (INA)	202

=== Women's ===
==== Individual compound ====
===== Qualification round =====
December 14

Rank	Athlete	Score	10s	Xs
1	Aung Ngeain (MYA)	686	42	13
2	Saritha Cham Nong (MAS)	680	40	16
3	Dellie Threesyadinda (INA)	674	36	10
4	Fatin Nurfatehah Mat Salleh (MAS)	674	35	13
5	Nor Rizah Ishak (MAS)	674	35	12
6	Rungtiwa Tongkhaw (THA)	674	31	9
7	Nguyen Thi Kim Anh (VIE)	672	36	10
8	Nareumon Junsook (THA)	670	35	13
9	Le Ngoc Huyen (VIE)	667	31	9
10	Loh Tze Chieh Contessa (SIN)	666	27	7
11	Della Adisty Handayani (INA)	665	30	16
12	Sri Ranti (INA)	662	31	9
13	Aye Aye Thin (MYA)	661	29	11
14	Rona Siska Sari (INA)	660	27	10
15	Daophasouk Detsone (LAO)	655	28	8
16	Phone Kamkeo (LAO)	649	25	12
17	Suvaporn Anutaraporn (THA)	648	23	9
18	Norhayati Al Madihah Hashim (MAS)	647	23	5
19	Yaw Sein Yah (MYA)	646	26	9
20	Yonlada Robmaung (THA)	640	19	5
21	Bouppha Thana (LAO)	636	21	4
22	Pham Thi Kieu (VIE)	635	18	5
23	Hla Hla San (MYA)	633	15	4
24	Nguyen Hong Anh (VIE)	618	9	3

===== Knockout round =====
December 15

1/8 eliminations
Aung Ngeain (MYA)
Bye
LT Chieh Contessa (SIN)	144
Le Ngoc Huyen (VIE)	134
Rungtiwa Tongkhaw (THA)	136
Daophasouk Detsone (LAO)	132
Phone Kamkeo (LAO)	138
FN Mat Salleh (MAS)	144
3	Dellie Threesyadinda (INA)
Bye
11	Aye Aye Thin (MYA)	133
6	Nguyen Thi Kim Anh (VIE)	133
7	Nareumon Junsook (THA)	134
10	Della Adisty Handayani (INA)	133
Bye
2	Saritha Cham Nong (MAS)

1/4 eliminations
1	Aung Ngeain (MYA)	142
9	LT Chieh Contessa (SIN)	139
5	Rungtiwa Tongkhaw (THA)	141
4	FN Mat Salleh (MAS)	146
3	Dellie Threesyadinda (INA)	135
11	Aye Aye Thin (MYA)	130
7	Nareumon Junsook (THA)	142
2	Saritha Cham Nong (MAS)	142

Semifinal
1	Aung Ngeain (MYA)	143
4	FN Mat Salleh (MAS)	137
3	Dellie Threesyadinda (INA)	141
2	Saritha Cham Nong (MAS)	140

Gold medal match
1	Aung Ngeain (MYA)	138
3	Dellie Threesyadinda (INA)	130
Bronze medal match
4	FN Mat Salleh (MAS)	139
2	Saritha Cham Nong (MAS)	144

==== Team compound ====
===== Qualification round =====
December 14

Rank	Team	Score	10s	Xs
1	Malaysia (MAS)	2028	110	41
2	Indonesia (INA)	2001	97	35
3	Myanmar (MYA)	1993	97	33
4	Thailand (THA)	1992	89	31
5	Vietnam (VIE)	1974	85	24
6	Laos (LAO)	1940	74	24

===== Knockout round =====
December 17

1/4 eliminations
1	Malaysia (MAS)
Bye
5	Vietnam (VIE)	203
4	Thailand (THA)	210
3	Myanmar (MYA)
6	Laos (LAO)
Bye
2	Indonesia (INA)

Semifinal
1	Malaysia (MAS)	212
4	Thailand (THA)	215
3	Myanmar (MYA)	218
2	Indonesia (INA)	219

Gold medal match
4	Thailand (THA)	208
2	Indonesia (INA)	217
Bronze medal match
1	Malaysia (MAS)	215
3	Myanmar (MYA)	222

==== Individual recurve ====
===== Qualification round =====
December 14

Rank	Athlete	Score	10s	Xs
1	Ika Yuliana Rochmawati (INA)	651	20	10
2	Titik Kusumawardani (INA)	650	28	10
3	Diananda Choirunisa (INA)	650	20	6
4	Loc Thi Dao (VIE)	637	22	11
5	Erwina Safitri (INA)	632	14	4
6	Chan Jing Ru (SIN)	625	19	6
7	Thin Thin Khine (MYA)	620	10	3
8	San Yu Htwe (MYA)	617	15	3
9	Waraporn Phutdee (THA)	611	14	8
10	Loh Tze Rong Vanessa (SIN)	605	12	1
11	Thazin Aung (MYA)	599	14	7
12	Panumard Sukdee (THA)	598	12	6
13	Nguyen Thi Quyen Trang (VIE)	598	11	0
14	Duong Thi Kim Lien (VIE)	598	10	3
15	Pattheera Boonnark (THA)	597	10	4
16	Farah Amalina Azhar (MAS)	592	11	4
17	Lui Su Lin (SIN)	591	11	5
18	Sunantra Suchat (MAS)	588	8	3
19	Zar Khyi Win (MYA)	587	9	2
20	Nur Aliya Ghapar (MAS)	586	12	4
21	Shahira Abdul Halim (MAS)	572	8	2
22	Sirilak Suksamorn (THA)	570	12	4
23	Tran My Phuong (VIE)	563	4	3
24	Ong Xue Ming Clarice (SIN)	549	6	1
25	Kesone Chanthavongsa (LAO)	521	7	2

===== Knockout round =====
December 15

Round of 16
1	IY Rochmawati (INA)
Bye
9	P Sukdee (THA)	0	0	1	2	0
8	L Vanessa (SIN)	2	2	1	0	2
5	Thin Thin Khine (MYA)	0	1	2	2	2
12	S Suchat (MAS)	2	1	0	0	0
13	Chanthavongsa (LAO)	0	2	1	0	0
4	Chan Jing Ru (SIN)	2	0	1	2	2
3	Loc Thi Dao (VIE)
Bye
11	F Azhar (MAS)	0	2	0	1	2	1
6	San Yu Htwe (MYA)	2	0	2	1	0	0
7	W Phutdee (THA)	0	1	0	0
10	N Trang (VIE)	2	1	2	2
Bye
2	Kusumawardani (INA)

Quarter-finals
1	IY Rochmawati (INA)	0	2	2	2
8	L Vanessa (SIN)	2	0	0	0
5	Thin Thin Khine (MYA)	2	0	0	0
4	Chan Jing Ru (SIN)	0	2	2	2
3	Loc Thi Dao (VIE)	2	2	2
11	F Azhar (MAS)	0	0	0
10	N Trang (VIE)	0	1	2	2	0	0
2	Kusumawardani (INA)	2	1	0	0	2	1

Semifinal
1	IY Rochmawati (INA)	1	2	0	0	0
4	Chan Jing Ru (SIN)	1	0	2	2	2
3	Loc Thi Dao (VIE)	0	2	0	1	1
2	Kusumawardani (INA)	2	0	2	1	1

Gold medal match
4	Chan Jing Ru (SIN)	0	2	0	2	2
2	Kusumawardani (INA)	2	0	2	0	0
Bronze medal match
1	IY Rochmawati (INA)	2	2	0	2
3	Loc Thi Dao (VIE)	0	0	2	0

==== Team recurve ====
===== Qualification round =====
December 14

Rank	Team	Score	10s	Xs
1	Indonesia (INA)	1951	68	26
2	Myanmar (MYA)	1836	39	13
3	Vietnam (VIE)	1833	43	14
4	Singapore (SIN)	1821	42	12
5	Thailand (THA)	1806	36	18
6	Malaysia (MAS)	1766	31	11

===== Knockout round =====
December 17

1/4 eliminations
1	Indonesia (INA)
Bye
5	Thailand (THA)	197
4	Singapore (SIN)	188
3	Vietnam (VIE)	194
6	Malaysia (MAS)	188
Bye
2	Myanmar (MYA)

Semifinal
1	Indonesia (INA)	206
5	Thailand (THA)	202
3	Vietnam (VIE)	196
2	Myanmar (MYA)	187

Gold medal match
1	Indonesia (INA)	212
3	Vietnam (VIE)	200
Bronze medal match
5	Thailand (THA)	192
2	Myanmar (MYA)	197

=== Mixed ===
==== Team compound ====
===== Qualification round =====
December 14

Rank	Athlete	Score	10s	Xs
1	Malaysia (MAS); Muhammad Zaki Mahazam; Saritha Cham Nong	1374	87	34
2	Vietnam (VIE); Nguyen Tien Cuong; Nguyen Thi Kim Anh	1371	88	33
3	Thailand (THA); Chan Chai Pratheepwatanawong; Rungtiwa Tongkhaw	1362	73	28
4	Myanmar (MYA); Shein Htet Kyaw; Aung Ngeain	1357	73	23
5	Indonesia (INA); Yanu Ardianto; Dellie Threesyadinda	1356	72	23
6	Singapore (SIN); Pang Toh Jin; Loh Tze Chieh Contessa	1330	57	16
7	Laos (LAO); Khamvarn Vanlivong; Phone Kamkeo*	1308	48	12

- Replace Daophasouk Detsone

===== Knockout round =====
December 16

1/4 eliminations
1	Malaysia (MAS)
Bye
5	Indonesia (INA)	141
4	Myanmar (MYA)	145
3	Thailand (THA)	142
6	Singapore (SIN)	136
7	Laos (LAO)	136
2	Vietnam (VIE)	128

Semifinal
1	Malaysia (MAS)	142
4	Myanmar (MYA)	141
3	Thailand (THA)	143
7	Laos (LAO)	148

Gold medal match
1	Malaysia (MAS)	149
7	Laos (LAO)	149
Bronze medal match
4	Myanmar (MYA)	147
3	Thailand (THA)	137

==== Team recurve ====
===== Qualification round =====
December 14

Rank	Athlete	Score	10s	Xs
1	Indonesia (INA); Riau Ega Agatha Salsabilla; Ika Yuliana Rochmawati	1308	46	21
2	Vietnam (VIE); Dao Trong Kien; Loc Thi Dao	1276	45	17
3	Myanmar (MYA); Nay Myo Aung; Thin Thin Khine	1271	36	12
4	Singapore (SIN); Tan Si Lie; Chan Jing Ru	1270	39	16
5	Thailand (THA); Witthaya Tham Wong; Waraporn Phutdee	1263	36	16
6	Malaysia (MAS); Khairul Anuar Mohamad; Nur Aliya Ghapar*	1260	39	15
7	Laos (LAO); Khampheng Inthavong; Kesone Chanthavongsa	1101	20	6

- Replace Farah Amalina Azhar

===== Knockout round =====
December 16

1/4 eliminations
1	Indonesia (INA)
Bye
5	Thailand (THA)	130
4	Singapore (SIN)	142
3	Myanmar (MYA)	129
6	Malaysia (MAS)	129
7	Laos (LAO)	106
2	Vietnam (VIE)	136

Semifinal
1	Indonesia (INA)	132
4	Singapore (SIN)	133
6	Malaysia (MAS)	119
2	Vietnam (VIE)	121

Gold medal match
4	Singapore (SIN)	136
2	Vietnam (VIE)	142
Bronze medal match
1	Indonesia (INA)	136
6	Malaysia (MAS)	135

Preceded by 2011	Archery at the SEA Games; 2013 SEA Games	Succeeded by 2015
