= Jonathan Chan =

Singaporean diver

Personal information
- Full name: Jonathan Chan Fan Keng
- Born: 10 May 1997 (age 29) Singapore
- Education: Anglo-Chinese School (Independent); Singapore University of Technology and Design

Sport
- Country: Singapore
- Sport: Diving
- Events: 10m, 10m synchro
- Coached by: Li Peng
Medal record
Diving
Representing Singapore
Asian Diving Cup
Gold medal – first place	2019 Kuala Lumpur	10 m platform
Southeast Asian Games
Silver medal – second place	2017 Kuala Lumpur	10 m mixed synchro
Silver medal – second place	2017 Kuala Lumpur	10 m team
Silver medal – second place	2021 Hanoi	10 m synchro
Bronze medal – third place	2015 Singapore	10 m platform
Bronze medal – third place	2017 Kuala Lumpur	10 m platform
Bronze medal – third place	2017 Kuala Lumpur	10 m synchro
FINA Diving Grand Prix
Gold medal – first place	2018 Singapore	10 m platform
Silver medal – second place	2017 San Juan	10 m mixed synchro
Bronze medal – third place	2018 Kuala Lumpur	10 m platform

Jonathan Chan Fan Keng (Chinese: 曾繁铿; born 10 May 1997) is a Singaporean former diver. He competed in the 2020 Summer Olympics after his qualification through a victory in the 2019 Asian Diving Cup in Kuala Lumpur, Malaysia on 8 September 2019. He is the first Singaporean diver to have qualified for the Olympic Games. Due to his Olympic qualification, Chan was nominated for the Straits Times Athlete of the Year award in 2020.

== Diving career ==
Chan has been doing gymnastics since five years old and has cited local gymnast Hoe Wah Toon as his inspiration. He switched over to diving, following after his older sister, Kimberly Chan, who was scouted as a prospective diver, since there was only a year left to train in the lead up to the 2010 Summer Youth Olympics that was held in Singapore.

Chan started diving competitively since 2013.

In 2019, Chan won the Men's 10m Platform final at the Asian Diving Cup in Kuala Lumpur, Malaysia and became the first Singaporean diver to qualify for the Olympics. At the 2020 Summer Olympics at Japan, Chan was placed 26th out of 29 divers and failed to qualify for the semi-finals.

At the 2021 Southeast Asian Games, Chan with his partner Max Lee, won the silver medal in the 10 m synchro event. Chan retired from diving after the SEA Games to pursue a career in the design industry.

== Early life and education ==
Chan studied at the Anglo-Chinese School (Independent) and the Singapore University of Technology and Design.

== Major competition results ==
Year	Competition	Venue	Position	Event	Notes
2013	Asian Youth Games	Nanjing, China	6th	10 m platform	
2014	Summer Youth Olympics	Nanjing, China	10th	10 m platform	
2014	Summer Youth Olympics	Nanjing, China	8th	10 m mixed team	
2015	Southeast Asian Games	Singapore	3rd	10 m platform	
2017	FINA Diving Grand Prix	San Juan, Puerto Rico	6th	10 m platform	
2017	FINA Diving Grand Prix	San Juan, Puerto Rico	2nd	10 m mixed synchro	
2017	World Aquatics Championships	Budapest, Hungary	33rd	10 m platform	
2017	World Aquatics Championships	Budapest, Hungary	14th	10 m team	
2017	World Aquatics Championships	Budapest, Hungary	15th	10 m mixed synchro	
2017	Southeast Asian Games	Kuala Lumpur, Malaysia	2nd	10 m mixed synchro	
2017	Southeast Asian Games	Kuala Lumpur, Malaysia	2nd	10 m team	
2017	Southeast Asian Games	Kuala Lumpur, Malaysia	3rd	10 m platform	
2017	Southeast Asian Games	Kuala Lumpur, Malaysia	3rd	10 m synchro	
2018	FINA Diving World Cup	Wuhan, China	22nd	10 m platform	
2018	Asian Games	Jakarta, Indonesia	8th	10 m synchro	
2018	FINA Diving Grand Prix	Kuala Lumpur, Malaysia	3rd	10 m platform	
2018	FINA Diving Grand Prix	Singapore	1st	10 m platform	
2019	FINA Diving Grand Prix	Calgary, Canada	22nd	10 m platform	
2019	Summer Universiade	Naples, Italy	16th	10 m platform	
2019	World Aquatics Championships	Gwangju, South Korea	32nd	10 m platform	
2019	Asian Diving Cup	Kuala Lumpur, Malaysia	1st	10 m platform	
2019	FINA Diving Grand Prix	Singapore	11th	10 m platform	
2021	FINA Diving World Cup	Tokyo, Japan	24th	10 m platform	
2021	FINA Diving World Cup	Tokyo, Japan	15th	10 m synchro	
2021	Summer Olympics	Tokyo, Japan	26th	10 m platform	
2022	Southeast Asian Games	Hanoi, Vietnam	2nd	10 m synchro	
