= Indonesia at the 2017 SEA Games =

- IOC code: INA
- NOC: Indonesian Olympic Committee
- Website: www.nocindonesia.or.id (in English)

in Kuala Lumpur 14–30 August
- Competitors: 535 in 38 sports
- Flag bearer: I Gede Siman Sudartawa (swimming)
- Medals Ranked 5th: Gold 38 Silver 63 Bronze 90 Total 191

SEA Games appearances (overview)
- 1977; 1979; 1981; 1983; 1985; 1987; 1989; 1991; 1993; 1995; 1997; 1999; 2001; 2003; 2005; 2007; 2009; 2011; 2013; 2015; 2017; 2019; 2021; 2023; 2025; 2027; 2029

Indonesia was participating in the 2017 SEA Games from 14 to 30 August 2017. The Indonesian contingent was represented by 535 athletes in 38 sports. A total of 55 gold medals are being targeted for 2017 edition.

Indonesian contingent collected a medal count of 38 gold, 63 silver and 90 bronze medals as the multi-sport events concluded on 30 August 2017.

== Medal summary ==
=== Medal by sport ===
Medals by sport
Sport	1st place, gold medalist(s)	2nd place, silver medalist(s)	3rd place, bronze medalist(s)	Total	Rank
Archery	4	1	1	6	2
Athletics	5	7	3	15	4
Badminton	2	0	4	6	2
Basketball	0	0	0	0	0
Billiards and snooker	0	1	2	3	6
Bowling	0	0	0	0	0
Boxing	1	1	1	3	3
Cricket	0	1	1	2	4
Cycling	2	2	7	11	3
Diving	0	1	3	4	3
Fencing	0	0	1	1	5
Football	0	0	1	1	4
Futsal	0	0	1	1	4
Golf	0	1	1	2	3
Gymnastics	1	2	6	9	4
Indoor hockey	0	2	0	2	3
Judo	2	1	1	4	(1)
Karate	3	3	7	13	3
Pencak silat	2	4	9	15	3
Sepak takraw	0	2	3	5	4
Shooting	1	0	0	1	6
Short track speed skating	0	1	1	2	4
Squash	0	1	3	4	4
Swimming	4	11	10	25	4
Synchronised swimming	0	0	3	3	3
Table tennis	0	0	4	4	4
Taekwondo	2	3	4	9	4
Tennis	1	1	0	2	2
Volleyball	0	2	0	2	2
Waterskiing	2	7	6	15	3
Water polo	0	1	1	2	3
Weightlifting	2	2	0	4	(1)
Wushu	3	3	3	9	3
Total	38	63	90	191	5

=== Medal by date ===
Medals by date
Day	Date	1st place, gold medalist(s)	2nd place, silver medalist(s)	3rd place, bronze medalist(s)	Total
–3	16 August	2	0	0	2
–2	17 August	0	0	1	1
–1	18 August	0	0	2	2
0	19 August	0	2	1	3
1	20 August	1	2	6	9
2	21 August	4	6	5	15
3	22 August	5	4	8	17
4	23 August	3	3	9	15
5	24 August	4	7	8	19
6	25 August	3	11	5	19
7	26 August	9	9	9	27
8	27 August	0	6	4	10
9	28 August	1	4	6	11
10	29 August	6	8	25	39
11	30 August	0	1	1	2
Total		38	63	90	191

== Medalists ==
Medal	Name	Sport	Event	Date
Gold	Sri Ranti	Archery	Women's individual compound	16 August
Gold	Prima Wisnu Wardhana	Archery	Men's individual compound	16 August
Gold	Diananda Choirunisa	Archery	Women's individual recurve	20 August
Gold	Lindswell Kwok	Wushu	Women's taijijian	21 August
Gold	Felda Elvira Santoso	Wushu	Women's Dao Shu (broadsword)	21 August
Gold	Sharon Limansantoso; Tannya Roumimper	Bowling	Women's doubles	21 August
Gold	I Gede Siman Sudartawa	Swimming	Men's 50 m backstroke	21 August
Gold	Juwita Niza Wasni	Wushu	Women's nandao + Nangun	22 August
Gold	Riau Ega Agatha; Diananda Choirunisa	Archery	Mixed team recurve	22 August
Gold	Muhammad Naufal Mahardika	Shooting	Men's 10 m air rifle	22 August
Gold	Srunita Sari Sukatendel	Karate	Women's kumite –50 kg	22 August
Gold	Hendro Yap	Athletics	Men's 20 km walk	22 August
Gold	Rifda Irfanaluthfi	Gymnastics	Women's balance beam	23 August
Gold	Iwan Bidu Sirait	Karate	Men's kumite –55 kg	23 August
Gold	Cok Istri Agung Sanistyarani	Karate	Women's kumite –61 kg	23 August
Gold	Aldoms Suguro	Boxing	Men's flyweight	24 August
Gold	Jonatan Christie; Berry Angriawan; Edi Subaktiar; Fajar Alfian; Firman Abdul Kholik; Hafiz Faizal; Hardianto; Ihsan Maulana Mustofa; Muhammad Rian Ardianto; Panji Ahmad Maulana	Badminton	Men's team	24 August
Gold	Triady Fauzi Sidiq	Swimming	Men's 200 m individual medley	24 August
Gold	Triyaningsih	Athletics	Women's 10,000 m	24 August
Gold	Gagarin Nathaniel Yus	Swimming	Men's 100 m breaststroke	25 August
Gold	Eki Febri Ekawati	Athletics	Women's shot put	25 August
Gold	Agus Prayogo	Athletics	Men's 10,000 m	25 August
Gold	Anggi Faisal Mubarok; Asep Yuldan Sani; Nunu Nugraha	Pencak silat	Men's team artistic	26 August
Gold	Christopher Rungkat	Tennis	Men's singles	26 August
Gold	Muhammad Zahidi Putu Pranoto	Waterskiing	Men's overall	26 August
Gold	I Gusti Bagus Saputra	Cycling	Men's BMX	26 August
Gold	Elga Kharisma Novanda	Cycling	Women's BMX	26 August
Gold	Mochammad Syaiful Raharjo	Judo	Men's 66 kg	26 August
Gold	Iksan Apriyadi	Judo	Men's 73 kg	26 August
Gold	Indra Gunawan	Swimming	Men's 50 m breaststroke	26 August
Gold	Atjong Tio Purwanto	Athletics	Men's 3000 m steeplechase	26 August
Gold	Mariska Halinda	Taekwondo	Women's bantamweight 53 kg	28 August
Gold	Muhammad Zahidi Putu Pranoto	Waterskiing	Men's jumping	29 August
Gold	Wewey Wita	Pencak silat	Women's Class B 50–55 kg	29 Augusts
Gold	Deni	Weightlifting	Men's 69 kg	29 August
Gold	Jonatan Christie	Badminton	Men's singles	29 August
Gold	I Ketut Ariana	Weightlifting	Men's 77 kg	29 August
Gold	Ibrahim Zarman	Taekwondo	Men's bantamweight 63 kg	29 August
Silver	Agus Prayogo	Athletics	Men's marathon	19 August
Silver	Abdul Halim S. Radjiu; Hendra Pago; Herson Mohamad; Nofrizal; Rezki Yusuf Djaina; Rizky Abdul Rahman Pago; Saiful Rijal; Syamsul Hadi; Victoria Eka Prasetyo	Sepak takraw	Men's team regu	19 August
Silver	Muhammad Zaki; Beby Willy Eka; Muhammad Hamid Firdaus; Silvester Golberg Manik; Maulana Bayu Herfianto; Benny Respati; Yusuf Budiman; Rezza Auditya Putra; Delvin Felliciano; Ridjkie Mulia; Rian Rinaldo; Zaenal Arifin; Novian Dwi Putra	Water polo	Men's tournament	20 August
Silver	Bobie Valentius Gunawan	Wushu	Men's taijijian	20 August
Silver	Achmad Hulaefi	Wushu	Men's Dao Shu + Gun Shu	21 August
Silver	Monica Pransisca Sugianto	Wushu	Women's Dao Shu (broadsword)	21 August
Silver	Diananda Choirunisa; Linda Lestari; Titik Kusumawardani	Archery	Women's team recurve	21 August
Silver	Aflah Fadlan Prawira	Swimming	Men's 400 m freestyle	21 August
Silver	Nurul Fajar Fitriyati	Swimming	Women's 100 m backstroke	21 August
Silver	Triady Fauzi Sidiq	Swimming	Men's 50 m butterfly	21 August
Silver	Rifda Irfanaluthfi	Gymnastics	Women's vault	22 August
Silver	Sisilia Agustiani Ora	Karate	Women's individual kata	22 August
Silver	Ahmad Zigi Zaresta Yuda	Karate	Men's individual kata	22 August
Silver	Yessy Venisia Yosaputra	Swimming	Women's 200 m backstroke	22 August
Silver	Agus Adi Prayoko	Gymnastics	Men's vault	23 August
Silver	Triady Fauzi Sidiq	Swimming	Men's 100 m butterfly	23 August
Silver	Maria Natalia Londa	Athletics	Women's triple jump	23 August
Silver	Yolla Primadona Jampil; Hendy	Pencak silat	Men's artistic doubles	24 August
Silver	Billy Muhammad Islam; Diwan Rezaldy Syahril; Hardy Rachmadian; Hengki; Ryan Leonard Lalisang; Yeri Ramadona	Bowling	Men's team of five	24 August
Silver	Sarohatua Lumban Tobing	Boxing	Men's light welterweight	24 August
Silver	Andi Dasril Dwi Dharmawan; Andi Tomy Aditya Mardana; Aspar Sesasria	Karate	Men's team kata	24 August
Silver	Ade Furkon; Agung Wilant	Squash	Men's jumbo doubles	24 August
Silver	I Gede Siman Sudartawa	Swimming	Men's 100 m backstroke	24 August
Silver	Suwandi Wijaya	Athletics	Men's long jump	24 August
Silver	Dini Mita Sari; Evana Rahmawati; Florensia Cristy; Lena; Leni; Sutini binti seni	Sepak takraw	Women's quadrant	25 August
Silver	Mohd Fadlin; Iswandi; Eko Rimbawan; Yaspi Boby	Athletics	Men's 4 × 100 m relay	25 August
Silver	Abd Hafiz	Athletics	Men's javelin throw	25 August
Silver	Maria Natalia Londa	Athletics	Women's long jump	25 August
Silver	Dewi Andriani; Lina Lince Rumaropen; Euis Nuraeni; Novita Natalia Since Sada; Nuraini Sugiarti; Ika Oktavianti; Rwede Sabatine Tamar Sawor; Sismya Winarsih Kadarisman; Annur Amalia El Islamy; Greschela; Aulia Ghassani Putri Arindah; Sarah Amaniah	Indoor hockey	Women's tournament	25 August
Silver	Tannya Roumimper	Bowling	Women's masters	25 August
Silver	Azzahra Permatahani	Swimming	Women's 400 m individual medley	25 August
Silver	Triady Fauzi Sidiq	Swimming	Men's 50 m freestyle	25 August
Silver	Sofie Kemala Fatiha	Swimming	Women's 50 m backstroke	25 August
Silver	Emilia Nova	Athletics	Women's heptathlon	25 August
Silver	Aflah Fadlan Prawira	Swimming	Men's 400 m individual medley	25 August
Silver	Galuh Mutiara Maulidina	Waterskiing	Women's wakeboarding	26 August
Silver	Nur Alimah Priambodo	Waterskiing	Women's overall	26 August
Silver	Febrianto Kadir	Waterskiing	Men's overall	26 August
Silver	Maulana Haidir	Taekwondo	Men's individual poomsae	26 August
Silver	Ida Ayu Indira Melati Putri; Rivani Adelia Sihotang; Tatiana Jaqueline Wijaya	Golf	Women's team	26 August
Silver	Jessy Rompies; Christopher Rungkat	Tennis	Mixed doubles	26 August
Silver	Tomi Effendi; Candra Juli Prawesti; Budi Akhmad; Daarul Quthni; Zein Hamdani; Zaki Lukman Hakim; Prima Rinaldi Santoso; Adit Tri Juwantoro; Alvin Nourul Saepul Mimbar; Iskandar Zulkarnaen; Astri Rahmad; Dea Dwi Permana	Indoor hockey	Men's tournament	26 August
Silver	I Gede Siman Sudartawa; Gagarin Nathaniel Yus; Glenn Victor Sutanto; Triady Fauzi Sidiq	Swimming	Men's 4 × 100 m medley relay	26 August
Silver	Mario Wuysang; Abraham Damar Grahita; Kevin Yonas Argadiba Sitorus; Christian Ronald Sitepu; Arki Dikania Wisnu; Diftha Pratama; Hardianus Lakudu; Andakara Prastawa Dhyaksa; Sandy Febriansyakh Kurniawan; Ebrahim Enguio Lopez; Firman Dwi Nugroho; Vincent Rivaldi Kosasih	Basketball	Men's tournament	26 August
Silver	Dinggo Ardian Prayogo	Taekwondo	Men's lightweight 74 kg	27 August
Silver	Shaleha Fitriana Yusuf	Taekwondo	Women's lightweight 62 kg	27 August
Silver	Horas Manurung	Judo	Men's 81 kg	27 August
Silver	Crismonita Dwi Putri; Santia Tri Kusuma	Cycling	Women's team sprint	27 August
Silver	Agung Seganti; Aji Maulana; Antho Bertiyawan; Delly Dwi Putra Heryanto; Dio Zulfikri; Doni Haryono; Hernanda Zulfi; Mahfud Nurcahyadi; Ramzil Huda; Rendy Febriant Tamamilang; Rivan Nurmulki; Sigit Ardian	Volleyball	Men's tournament	27 August
Silver	Aprilia Santini Manganang; Asih Titi Pangestuti; Berlian Marshella; Hany Budiarty; Megawati Hangestri Pertiwi; Nandita Ayu Salsabila; Novia Andriyanti; Putri Andya Agustina; Tri Retno Mutiara Lutfi; Wilda Siti Nurfadhilah Sugandi; Yolana Betha Pangestika; Yolla Yuliana	Volleyball	Women's tournament	27 August
Silver	Surahmat Wijoyo	Weightlifting	Men's 56 kg	28 August
Silver	Andriani; Annisa Sulistianingsih; Berlian Duma Pare; Netty Sitompul; Ni Kadek Fitria Rada Rani; Ni Made Putri Suwandewi; Ni Putu Ayu Nanda Sakarini; Ni Wayan Sariani; Puji Haryanti; Putu Sri Apridayanti; Tantri Wigradianti; Tazkia Hanum Dornes; Vegy Januarika; Yulia Anggraeni	Cricket	Women's twenty20 tournament	28 August
Silver	Eko Yuli Irawan	Weightlifting	Men's 62 kg	28 August
Silver	Sugianto	Pencak silat	Men's artistic singles	28 August
Silver	Indra Hardinata	Waterskiing	Men's slalom	29 August
Silver	Ade Hermana	Waterskiing	Men's jumping	29 August
Silver	Rossi Rusdi Amir	Waterskiing	Women's jumping	29 August
Silver	Firman	Pencak silat	Men's Class A 45–50 kg	29 August
Silver	Dimas Ridho Suprihono	Waterskiing	Men's trick	29 August
Silver	Crismonita Dwi Putri	Cycling	Women's 500 m time trial	29 August
Silver	Steavanus Wihardja	Short track speed skating	Men's 500 m	29 August
Silver	Pipiet Kamelia	Pencak silat	Women's Class E 65–70 kg	29 August
Silver	Adityo Restu Putra; Andriyan	Diving	Men's synchronized 10 m platform	30 August
Bronze	Dellie Threesyadinda; Triya Resky Adriya; Rona Siska Sari	Archery	Women's team compound	17 August
Bronze	Aflah Fadlan Prawira	Swimming	Men's 10 km open water	18 August
Bronze	Anisa Feritrianti; Claudia Megawati Suyanto	Synchronised swimming	Women's duet technical routine	18 August
Bronze	Ayudya Suidarwanty Pratiwi; Annisa Rachmawati; Alya Nadira Trifiansyah; Dewi Ratih; Ivy Nernie Priscilla; Hanna Firdaus; Upiet Sarimanah; Hudaidah Kadir; Inez Febrianti Rasyid; Nyoman Ayu Savitri Arsana; Rani Raida; Siti Balkis; Dinda Nur Asmarandana	Water polo	Women's tournament	19 August
Bronze	Felda Elvira Santoso	Wushu	Women's Gun Shu (cudgel)	20 August
Bronze	Anisa Feritrianti; Claudia Megawati Suyanto	Synchronised swimming	Women's duet free routine	20 August
Bronze	Yeri Ramadona	Bowling	Men's singles	20 August
Bronze	Amara Cinthia Gebby; Anisa Feritrianti; Claudia Megawati Suyanto; Iin Rahmadhania; Maharani Sekar Langit; Naima Syeeda Sharita; Nurfa Nurul Utama; Petra Septaria Puspa Melati; Pratiwi Adhiati Kusumawardani; Visky Sekar Floreta Pribadi	Synchronised swimming	Women's team free routine	20 August
Bronze	Ficky Supit Santoso; M. Bima Abdi Negara	Table tennis	Men's doubles	20 August
Bronze	Gustin Dwijayanti; Lilis Indriani	Table tennis	Women's doubles	20 August
Bronze	Muhammad Daffa Golden Boy	Wushu	Men's Qiang Shu (spear)	21 August
Bronze	Dini Mita Sari; Evana Rahmawati; Florensia Cristy; Lena; Leni	Sepak takraw	Women's regu	21 August
Bronze	Billy Muhammad Islam; Hardy Rachmadian	Bowling	Men's doubles	21 August
Bronze	Nurul Fajar Fitriyati; Patricia Yosita Hapsari; Ressa Kania Dewi; Sagita Putri Krisdewanti	Swimming	Women's 4 × 100 m freestyle relay	21 August
Bronze	Amalia Fauziah Nurun Nubuwah; Armartiani; Rifda Irfanaluthfi; Tazsa Miranda Devira	Gymnastics	Women's artistic team all-around	21 August
Bronze	Rifda Irfanaluthfi	Gymnastics	Women's uneven bars	22 August
Bronze	Dwi Samsul Arifin	Gymnastics	Men's rings	22 August
Bronze	Edgar Xavier Marvelo	Wushu	Men's Changquan	22 August
Bronze	Dessyinta Rakawuni Banurea	Karate	Women's kumite +68 kg	22 August
Bronze	Jintar Simanjuntak	Karate	Men's kumite –67 kg	22 August
Bronze	Abdul Halim S. Radjiu; Hendra Pago; Herson Mohamad; Nofrizal; Rezki Yusuf Djaina; Rizky Abdul Rahman Pago; Saiful Rijal; Syamsul Hadi; Victoria Eka Prasetyo	Sepak takraw	Men's team doubles	22 August
Bronze	Andrian	Athletics	Men's 400 m hurdles	22 August
Bronze	Glenn Victor Sutanto; I Gede Siman Sudartawa; Raymond Sumitra Lukman; Triady Fauzi Sidiq	Swimming	Men's 4 × 100 m freestyle relay	22 August
Bronze	Ayustina Delia Priatna	Cycling	Women's road race	23 August
Bronze	Rifda Irfanaluthfi	Gymnastics	Women's floor exercise	23 August
Bronze	Indra Jaya Kusuma	Fencing	Men's épée	23 August
Bronze	Billy Muhammad Islam; Hardy Rachmadian; Ryan Leonard Lalisang	Bowling	Men's trios	23 August
Bronze	Sandi Firmansah	Karate	Men's kumite –75 kg	23 August
Bronze	Yulanda Asmuruf	Karate	Women's kumite –68 kg	23 August
Bronze	Hendro Salim	Karate	Men's kumite +75 kg	23 August
Bronze	Glenn Victor Sutanto	Swimming	Men's 100 m butterfly	23 August
Bronze	Ricky Anggawidjaja	Swimming	Men's 200 m backstroke	23 August
Bronze	Apriani Rahayu; Dinar Dyah Ayustine; Fitriani; Gloria Emanuelle Widjaja; Gregoria Mariska Tunjung; Greysia Polii; Hanna Ramadini; Ni Ketut Mahadewi Istirani; Rosyita Eka Putri Sari; Shella Devi Aulia	Badminton	Women's team	24 August
Bronze	Richard Oscar Laim	Boxing	Men's middleweight	24 August
Bronze	Ayu Rahmawati; Eva Fitria Setiawati; Siti Maryam	Karate	Women's team kata	24 August
Bronze	Hendro Salim; Iwan Bidu Sirait; Jintar Simanjuntak; Jhoni Abdillah Sibarani; Rifki Ardiansyah Arrosyiid; Sandi Firmansah; Suryadi	Karate	Men's team kumite	24 August
Bronze	Catur Yuliana; Irma Maryani	Squash	Women's jumbo doubles	24 August
Bronze	Ressa Kania Dewi	Swimming	Women's 200 m individual medley	24 August
Bronze	Anandia Treciel Vanessae Evato	Swimming	Women's 100 m breaststroke	24 August
Bronze	Arun; Jefry Zen	Billiards and snooker	Men's 9-ball pool doubles	24 August
Bronze	Abdul Halim S. Radjiu; Hendra Pago; Herson Mohamad; Nofrizal; Saiful Rijal; Syamsul Hadi	Sepak takraw	Men's quadrant	25 August
Bronze	Ririn Rinasih; Riska Hermawan	Pencak silat	Women's artistic doubles	25 August
Bronze	Triyaningsih	Athletics	Women's 5000 m	25 August
Bronze	Anak Agung Istri Kania Ratih	Swimming	Women's 50 m backstroke	25 August
Bronze	Nurul Fajar Fitriyati; Anandia Treciel Vanessae Evato; Adinda Larasati Dewi; Patricia Yosita Hapsari	Swimming	Women's 4 × 100 m medley relay	25 August
Bronze	Rossi Rusdi Amir	Waterskiing	Women's overall	26 August
Bronze	Almay Rayhan Yagutah; Jonathan Wijono; Kevin Caesario Akbar; Naraajie Emerald Ramadhan Putra	Golf	Men's team	26 August
Bronze	Maulana Haidir; Muhammad Abdurrahman Wahyu; Muhammad Alfi Kusuma	Taekwondo	Men's team poomsae	26 August
Bronze	Defia Rosmaniar; Mutiara Habiba; Ruhil	Taekwondo	Women's team poomsae	26 August
Bronze	Novita Oktariyani; Lilis Indriani; Kharisma Nur Hawwa; Hani Tri Azhari; Gustin Dwijayanti	Table tennis	Women's team	26 August
Bronze	Agus Prayogo	Athletics	Men's 5000 m	26 August
Bronze	Aflah Fadlan Prawira	Swimming	Men's 1500 m freestyle	26 August
Bronze	Habibie Wahid; Ficky Supit Santoso; Donny Prasetya Aji; Deepash Anil Bhagwani; Muhannad Bima Abdi Negara	Table tennis	Men's team	26 August
Bronze	Agustin Elya Gradita Retong; Nathasa Debby Christaline; Yuni Anggraeni; Gabriel Sophia; Mega Nanda Perdana Putri; Lea Elvensia Wolobubo Kahol; Regita Pramesti; Kadek Pratita Citta Dewi; Mariam Ulfah; Sumiati; Yuliana Anggita Soemaryono; Henny Sutjiono	Basketball	Women's tournament	26 August
Bronze	Alek Hanif; Dini Imaniar; Galuh Mutiara Maulidina	Waterskiing	Mixed wakeboarding team	27 August
Bronze	Anggi Puspita Sari; Citra Adisti; Diah Tri Lestari; Dinar Kartika Sari; Diyana Herliana; Fitri Rosdiana; Fitriya Hilda; Maulina Novryliani; Maya Muharina Fajriah; Novita Murni Piranti; Rani Mulya Sari; Suciana Yuliana; Susi Susanti; Yunita Sari	Futsal	Women's tournament	27 August
Bronze	Hevrilia Windawati	Judo	Women's 70 kg	27 August
Bronze	Muhammad Nur Fathoni; Puguh Admadi; Reno Yudha Sansoko	Cycling	Men's team sprint	27 August
Bronze	Nabila Evandestiera	Gymnastics	Women's ball	28 August
Bronze	Nabila Evandestiera	Gymnastics	Women's hoop	28 August
Bronze	Reinaldy Atmanegara	Taekwondo	Men's finweight 54 kg	28 August
Bronze	Dhean Titania Fazrin	Taekwondo	Women's finweight 46 kg	28 August
Bronze	Uyun Muzizah	Cycling	Women's sprint	28 August
Bronze	Nandra Eko Wahyudi	Cycling	Men's omnium	28 August
Bronze	Ummu Thoyibhatus Sholikah	Waterskiing	Women's slalom	29 August
Bronze	Nur Alimah Priambodo	Waterskiing	Women's jumping	29 August
Bronze	Sarah Tria Monita	Pencak silat	Women's Class D 60–65 kg	29 August
Bronze	Galang Tri Widya Putra	Pencak silat	Men's Class B 50–55 kg	29 August
Bronze	Hanifan Yudani Kusumah	Pencak silat	Men's Class B 55–60 kg	29 August
Bronze	Gregoria Mariska Tunjung	Badminton	Women's singles	29 August
Bronze	Febrianto Kadir	Waterskiing	Men's trick	29 August
Bronze	Nur Alimah Priambodo	Waterskiing	Women's trick	29 August
Bronze	Santia Tri Kusuma	Cycling	Women's 500 m time trial	29 August
Bronze	Ihsan Maulana Mustofa	Badminton	Men's singles	29 August
Bronze	Eko Febrianto	Pencak silat	Men's Class J 90–95 kg	29 August
Bronze	Anton Yuspermana	Pencak silat	Men's Class H 80–85 kg	29 August
Bronze	Komang Harik Adi Putra	Pencak silat	Men's Class F 70–75 kg	29 August
Bronze	Aditya Gustama; Ahmad Ramdoni; Cristian Koda; Frengky Shony; Gede Darma Arta; I Dewa Gde Putra Kisawa; I Gede Suda Arsa; I Kadek Dharmawan; I Kadek Gamantika; I Ketut Arya Pastika; I Wayan Budiarta; Muhaddis; Muhamad Anjar Tadarus; Rojerio Maxi Koda	Cricket	Men's twenty20 tournament	29 August
Bronze	Eka Purnama Indah; Linadini Yasmin	Diving	Women's synchronized 3 m springboard	29 August
Bronze	Fajar Alfian; Muhammad Rian Ardianto	Badminton	Men's doubles	29 August
Bronze	Adityo Restu Putra; Tri Anggoro Priambodo	Diving	Men's synchronized 3 m springboard	29 August
Bronze	Gina Tri Lestari; Lutfi Nurhasanah; Pramudita Yuristya	Pencak silat	Women's artistic team	29 August
Bronze	Puspa Arumsari	Pencak silat	Women's artistic singles	29 August
Bronze	Della Dinarsari Harimurti; Andriyan	Diving	Mixed synchronized 10 m platform	29 August
Bronze	Aiman Cahyadi; Eko Bayu Nurhidayat; Fatahillah Abdullah; Robin Manullang	Cycling	Men's team pursuit	29 August
Bronze	Catur Yuliana; Irma Maryani; Rinduri Maulida Arnasty; Yaisha Putri Yasandi	Squash	Women's team	29 August
Bronze	Muhammad Nur Fathoni	Cycling	Men's keirin	29 August
Bronze	Ade Furkon; Agung Wilant; Eris Setiawan; Syauma Siswa Utama	Squash	Men's team	29 August
Bronze	Satria Tama Hardiyanto; Putu Gede Juni Antara; Andy Setyo; Ryuji Utomo; Evan Dimas; Muhammad Hargianto; Ezra Walian; Gavin Kwan Adsit; Febri Haryadi; Asnawi Mangkualam Bahar; Ricky Fajrin; Saddil Ramdani; Kurniawan Ajie; Hanif Abdurrauf Sjahbandi; Yabes Roni; Hansamu Yama; Marinus Maryanto Wanewar; Osvaldo Haay; Rezaldi Hehanusa; Septian David Maulana	Football	Men's tournament	29 August
Bronze	Alyssa Thirza Putri; Rafaela; Rahmah Osya Samudra; Ratu Afifah Nur Indah	Short track speed skating	Women's 3000 m relay	30 August

=== Multiple medalists ===
The following Indonesian competitors won several medals at the 2017 Southeast Asian Games.

Name	Sport	Gold	Silver	Bronze	Total
Diananda Choirunisa	Archery	2	1	0	3
Jonatan Christie	Badminton	2	0	0	2
Muhammad Zahidi Putu Pranoto	Waterskiing	2	0	0	2
Triady Fauzi Sidiq	Swimming	1	4	1	6
I Gede Siman Sudartawa	Swimming	1	2	1	4
Rifda Irfanaluthfi	Gymnastics	1	1	3	5
Agus Prayogo	Athletics	1	1	1	3
Christopher Rungkat	Tennis	1	1	0	2
Gagarin Nathaniel Yus	Swimming	1	1	0	2
Tannya Roumimper	Bowling	1	1	0	2
Iwan Bidu Sirait	Karate	1	0	1	2
Fajar Alfian	Badminton	1	0	1	2
Felda Elvira Santoso	Wushu	1	0	1	2
Ihsan Maulana Mustofa	Badminton	1	0	1	2
Muhammad Rian Ardianto	Badminton	1	0	1	2
Triyaningsih	Athletics	1	0	1	2
Aflah Fadlan Prawira	Swimming	0	2	2	4
Crismonita Dwi Putri	Cycling	0	2	0	2
Maria Natalia Londa	Athletics	0	2	0	2
Abdul Halim S. Radjiu	Sepak takraw	0	1	2	3
Billy Muhammad Islam	Bowling	0	1	2	3
Glenn Victor Sutanto	Swimming	0	1	2	3
Hardy Rachmadian	Bowling	0	1	2	3
Hendra Pago	Sepak takraw	0	1	2	3
Herson Mohamad	Sepak takraw	0	1	2	3
Nofrizal	Sepak takraw	0	1	2	3
Nur Alimah Priambodo	Waterskiing	0	1	2	3
Saiful Rijal	Sepak takraw	0	1	2	3
Syamsul Hadi	Sepak takraw	0	1	2	3
Ade Furkon	Squash	0	1	1	2
Adityo Restu Putra	Diving	0	1	1	2
Agung Wilant	Squash	0	1	1	2
Andriyan	Diving	0	1	1	2
Dini Mita Sari	Sepak takraw	0	1	1	2
Evana Rahmawati	Sepak takraw	0	1	1	2
Febrianto Kadir	Waterskiing	0	1	1	2
Florensia Cristy	Sepak takraw	0	1	1	2
Galuh Mutiara Maulidina	Waterskiing	0	1	1	2
Lena	Sepak takraw	0	1	1	2
Leni	Sepak takraw	0	1	1	2
Maulana Haidir	Taekwondo	0	1	1	2
Nurul Fajar Fitriyati	Swimming	0	1	1	2
Rezki Yusuf Djaina	Sepak takraw	0	1	1	2
Rizky Abdul Rahman Pago	Sepak takraw	0	1	1	2
Rossi Rusdi Amir	Waterskiing	0	1	1	2
Ryan Leonard Lalisang	Bowling	0	1	1	2
Santia Tri Kusuma	Cycling	0	1	1	2
Victoria Eka Prasetyo	Sepak takraw	0	1	1	2
Yeri Ramadona	Bowling	0	1	1	2
Anisa Feritrianti	Synchronised swimming	0	0	3	3
Claudia Megawati Suyanto	Synchronised swimming	0	0	3	3
Anandia Treciel Vanessae Evato	Swimming	0	0	2	2
Catur Yuliana	Squash	0	0	2	2
Ficky Supit Santoso	Table tennis	0	0	2	2
Gregoria Mariska Tunjung	Badminton	0	0	2	2
Gustin Dwijayanti	Table tennis	0	0	2	2
Hendro Salim	Karate	0	0	2	2
Irma Maryani	Squash	0	0	2	2
Jintar Simanjuntak	Karate	0	0	2	2
Lilis Indriani	Table tennis	0	0	2	2
M. Bima Abdi Negara	Table tennis	0	0	2	2
Muhammad Nur Fathoni	Cycling	0	0	2	2
Nabila Evandestiera	Gymnastics	0	0	2	2
Ressa Kania Dewi	Swimming	0	0	2	2
Sandi Firmansah	Karate	0	0	2	2
