= Weightlifting at the 2017 SEA Games – Results =

The weightlifting competitions at the 2017 SEA Games in Kuala Lumpur took place at Kuala Lumpur Convention Centre in Kuala Lumpur.

The 2017 Games featured competitions in five events.

== Results ==
=== Men's 56 kg ===
Rank	Athlete	Nation	Snatch (kg)				Clean & Jerk (kg)				Total
Rank	Athlete	Nation	1	2	3	Result	1	2	3	Result	Total
1st place, gold medalist(s)	Thạch Kim Tuấn	Vietnam	120	~~125~~	~~130~~	120	146	149	~~153~~	149	269
2nd place, silver medalist(s)	Surahmat Wijoyo	Indonesia	110	115	119	119	140	145	148	148	267
3rd place, bronze medalist(s)	Witoon Mingmoon	Thailand	108	110	~~112~~	110	147	149	~~160~~	149	259
4	Azroy Hazalwafie	Malaysia	111	115	~~118~~	115	137	141	143	143	258
5	Nestor Colonia	Philippines	~~110~~	110	113	113	140	~~146~~	~~146~~	140	253
6	Pyae Phyo	Myanmar	~~105~~	~~105~~	105	105	120	125	–	125	230

=== Men's 62 kg ===
Rank	Athlete	Nation	Snatch (kg)				Clean & Jerk (kg)				Total
Rank	Athlete	Nation	1	2	3	Result	1	2	3	Result	Total
1st place, gold medalist(s)	Trịnh Văn Vinh	Vietnam	130	135	~~138~~	135	162	172	–	172	307
2nd place, silver medalist(s)	Eko Yuli Irawan	Indonesia	135	138	140	140	162	166	~~169~~	166	306
3rd place, bronze medalist(s)	Myint Kyi	Myanmar	125	129	~~132~~	129	~~155~~	155	~~160~~	155	284
4	Aznil Bidin	Malaysia	120	~~126~~	~~126~~	120	155	~~159~~	159	159	279
5	Pongsakorn Nondara	Thailand	110	~~115~~	115	115	~~140~~	140	145	145	260

=== Men's 69 kg ===
Rank	Athlete	Nation	Snatch (kg)				Clean & Jerk (kg)				Total
Rank	Athlete	Nation	1	2	3	Result	1	2	3	Result	Total
1st place, gold medalist(s)	Deni	Indonesia	135	~~141~~	142	142	170	~~175~~	~~182~~	170	312
2nd place, silver medalist(s)	Tairat Bunsuk	Thailand	135	140	~~142~~	140	165	~~170~~	170	170	310
3rd place, bronze medalist(s)	Pham Tuan Anh	Vietnam	135	~~140~~	~~140~~	135	166	~~171~~	171	171	306
4	Muhammad Erry Hidayat	Malaysia	120	125	~~130~~	125	145	150	156	156	281
5	Gilton Fatima Guterres	Timor-Leste	70	~~80~~	~~80~~	70	90	~~100~~	–	90	160
6	Kyaw Moe Win	Myanmar	135	~~140~~	~~140~~	135	~~170~~	~~170~~	~~170~~	–	135

=== Men's 77 kg ===
Rank	Athlete	Nation	Snatch (kg)				Clean & Jerk (kg)				Total
Rank	Athlete	Nation	1	2	3	Result	1	2	3	Result	Total
1st place, gold medalist(s)	I Ketut Ariana	Indonesia	~~143~~	143	147	147	171	175	178	178	325
2nd place, silver medalist(s)	Nguyễn Hồng Ngọc	Vietnam	135	~~140~~	140	140	167	~~183~~	~~186~~	167	307
3rd place, bronze medalist(s)	Loro Wellkinson Peuji	Malaysia	~~135~~	~~135~~	135	135	160	~~167~~	~~167~~	160	295
4	Edeliju Mesquita	Timor-Leste	~~70~~	~~70~~	70	70	90	95	~~100~~	95	165
5	Chatuphum Chinnawong	Thailand	145	~~150~~	~~150~~	145	–	–	–	–	145

=== Men's 85 kg ===
Rank	Athlete	Nation	Snatch (kg)				Clean & Jerk (kg)				Total
Rank	Athlete	Nation	1	2	3	Result	1	2	3	Result	Total
1st place, gold medalist(s)	Pornchai Lobsi	Thailand	141	144	146	146	178	181	191	191	337
2nd place, silver medalist(s)	Fazrul Azrie	Malaysia	~~141~~	~~141~~	141	141	175	~~182~~	182	182	323
3rd place, bronze medalist(s)	Hoàng Tấn Tài	Vietnam	135	141	145	145	172	~~177~~	177	177	322
4	Edi Kurniawan	Indonesia	141	~~145~~	~~145~~	141	171	176	~~182~~	176	317
5	Sa Than Htike Win	Myanmar	~~130~~	130	~~140~~	130	160	165	~~170~~	165	295
