= Haziq Kamaruddin =

Malaysian archer (1993–2021)

Personal information
- Full name: Haziq bin Kamaruddin
- Nationality: Malaysian
- Born: 4 July 1993 Johor Bahru, Johor, Malaysia
- Died: 14 May 2021 (aged 27) Kajang, Selangor, Malaysia
- Resting place: Taman Koperasi Serkam Darat Cemetery, Merlimau, Melaka

Sport
- Country: Malaysia
- Sport: Archery
Medal record
Men's recurve archery
Representing Malaysia
Asian Games
Silver medal – second place	2014 Incheon	Men's team
Asian Archery Championships
Gold medal – first place	2011 Tehran	Team
Bronze medal – third place	2017 Dhaka	Team
SEA Games
Gold medal – first place	2011 Jakarta Palembang	Team
Gold medal – first place	2013 Naypyitaw	Team
Gold medal – first place	2015 Singapore	Team
Gold medal – first place	2017 Kuala Lumpur	Team
Silver medal – second place	2015 Singapore	Individual
Silver medal – second place	2019 Philippines	Team

Haziq Kamaruddin (4 July 1993 – 14 May 2021) was a Malaysian sport archer.

== Personal life ==
Haziq was born in Johor Bahru, Johor. A son of Kamaruddin Yusof, he studied at the University of Malaya. He married Shahira Abdul Halim and the couple had no children.

== Sport career ==
Haziq was a Malaysia's recurve men's team archer and two-time Olympian who had competed the archery event in the London 2012 and Rio 2016 Olympic Games. He also participated in World Archery Championships for four times from 2011 to 2017. Haziq also won gold medals at the 2011 Asian Archery Championships in Tehran, as well as the gold medal at the 2011 Asian Grand Prix in Laos and the bronze at the 2019 Asia Cup in the Philippines. Beside that he won four gold and two silver medals in both individual and team events in the SEA Games from 2011 until 2019.

== Awards ==
Haziq was picked as the recipient of the Johor Athlete Award 2011. Haziq together with Cheng Chu Sian and Khairul Anuar Mohamad made-up the Malaysia men's archery team which was honour as the National Men's Team of the Year in the National Sports Awards 2011. Haziq and national diving athlete Pandelela Rinong was respectively named the Bukit Jalil Sports School Sportsman and Sportswoman for 2012. In 2013, he was named Best Young Athlete at the 2012 Sportswriters Association of Malaysia (SAM)-100PLUS Award.

== Death ==
Haziq, aged 27, had collapsed after performing subuh prayer of the second day of the Hari Raya Aidilfitri at his house in Kajang before being rushed and pronounced dead at Kajang Hospital at 9.37 am. on 14 May 2021. As the post-mortem was being carry out at the hospital, social media has been abuzz with many speculations connecting his death cause to the COVID-19 pandemic and the vaccination programme which Haziq had just completed, with the second dose of the Pfizer-BioNTech vaccine on 4 May meant for athletes and officials in preparations for the forth coming Tokyo 2020 Olympic Games. The National Sports Council (NSC) instead had said that Haziq's body was tested negative for COVID-19 His body was taken to his wife's hometown in Merlimau, Melaka for prayers at Surau Al-Taqwa before burial at the Taman Koperasi Serkam Darat Cemetery, at 1.40 am in accordance with COVID-19 standard operating procedure (SOP) of the on-going Movement Control Order (MCO). The Ministry of Health (MOH), had finally issued a statement later after his burial, explaining that Haziq's death was not related to COVID-19 infection nor its vaccination and was due to complications arising from clogged heart blood vessels due to coronary artery atherosclerosis as shown by the post-mortem result.
