= Synchronised swimming at the 2017 SEA Games – Results =

The synchronised swimming competitions at the 2017 Southeast Asian Games in Kuala Lumpur took place at National Aquatic Centre, Bukit Jalil, Kuala Lumpur.

The 2017 Games featured competitions in 5 events.

== Solo Technical Routine ==
Rank	Country	Athlete	Execution	Impression	Elements	Total
1	Malaysia	Gan Hua Wei	22.1000	22.9000	28.8386	73.8386
2	Singapore	Debbie Soh Li Fei	22.6000	22.4000	28.8253	73.8253
3	Singapore	Miya Yong Hsing	22.2000	21.8000	28.3769	72.3769
4	Malaysia	Gan Zhen Yu	21.0000	21.0000	27.4292	70.0292
5	Indonesia	Claudia Megawati Suyanto	21.0000	20.5000	27.7267	69.2267
6	Thailand	Nantaya Polsen	20.7000	20.6000	27.4501	68.7501
7	Vietnam	Phan Manh Nhi	20.3000	19.6000	26.2501	66.1501
8	Thailand	Thanyaluck Puttisiriroj	19.2000	19.2000	24.1311	62.5311
9	Philippines	Jemimah Nissi Tiambeng	17.7000	18.1000	20.9851	56.7851

== Solo Free Routine ==
Rank	Country	Athlete	Execution	Difficulty	Artistic	Total
1	Singapore	Debbie Soh Li Fei	22.3000	22.7000	30.0000	75.0000
2	Malaysia	Lee Yhing Huey	22.2000	22.5000	30.0000	74.7000
3	Singapore	Miya Yong Hsing	22.2000	21.9000	28.9333	73.0333
4	Malaysia	Foong Yan Nie	21.5000	21.7000	28.6660	71.8667
5	Indonesia	Anisa Feritrianti	20.4000	21.2000	27.6000	69.2000
6	Thailand	Thanyaluck Puttisiriroj	19.7000	20.1000	27.8667	67.6667
7	Vietnam	Phan Tang Bao Tran	19.4000	19.6000	26.4000	65.4000
8	Philippines	Aaliyah Isabel Pacheco	17.7000	18.1000	25.3333	61.1333

== Duet Technical Routine ==
Rank	Country	Athlete	Execution	Impression	Elements	Total
1	Singapore	Miya Yong Hsing; Debbie Soh Li Fei	22.8000	22.7000	29.6791	75.1791
2	Malaysia	Gan Hua Wei; Lee Yhing Huey	22.4000	22.6000	29.3659	74.3659
3	Indonesia	Anisa Feritrianti; Claudia Megawati Suyanto	21.1000	21.2000	26.6504	68.9504
4	Malaysia	Wong Mei Teng; Chai Jia Yue	20.8000	21.0000	27.1187	68.9187
5	Vietnam	Phan Tang Bao Tran; Phan Manh Thi	20.3000	20.3000	26.2656	66.8656
6	Thailand	Nantaya Polsen; Kairika Poolprasat	20.0000	19.8000	26.4846	66.2846
7	Philippines	Ruth Desiree Abiera; Allyssa Marey Salvador	16.2000	17.3000	19.8949	53.3949
8	Brunei	Jacqueline Lim; Nur Hafizah Ahmad	15.3000	15.6000	20.0759	50.9759

== Duet Free Routine ==
Rank	Country	Athlete	Execution	Difficulty	Artistic	Total
1	Malaysia	Gan Hua Wei; Lee Yhing Huey	22.6000	22.9000	30.8000	76.3000
2	Singapore	Miya Yong Hsing; Debbie Soh Li Fei	22.9000	22.8000	30.5333	76.2333
3	Indonesia	Anisa Feritrianti; Claudia Megawati Suyanto	21.5000	20.9000	29.0667	71.4667
4	Malaysia	Lee Yiat Xin; Nur Liyana Nadirah	21.0000	20.8000	28.6667	70.4667
5	Vietnam	Phan Tang Bao Tran; Phan Manh Thi	19.9000	20.3000	27.0667	67.2667
6	Thailand	Nantaya Polsen; Kairika Poolprasat	19.6000	19.8000	26.4000	65.8000
7	Vietnam	Nguyen Hong An; Luu Nguyen Kieu An	18.5000	18.0000	24.2667	60.7667
8	Philippines	Allyssa Marey Salvador; Jemimah Nissi Tiambeng	18.0000	17.9000	23.7333	59.6333
9	Brunei	Nur Hafizah Ahmad; Jacqueline Lim	16.8000	16.3000	23.6000	56.7000

== Team Free Routine ==
Rank	Country	Athlete	Execution	Difficulty	Artistic	Total
1st place, gold medalist(s)	Singapore	Gwyneth Goh Xiao Hui; Hannah Chiang Yi Min; Miya Yong Hsing; Christine Mok Tze Yin; Shae-Lynn Yan Siying; Ariel Sng Kai Lin; Debbie Soh Li Fei; Rachel Thean Rae Sze; Vivien Tai Wen Ting	22.3000	22.7000	30.1333	75.1333
2nd place, silver medalist(s)	Malaysia	Chai Jia Yue; Foong Yan Nie; Gan Zhen Yu; Veronica Lee Yiat Lum; Lee Yiat Xin; Leong Jie Wen; Mandy Lim Jia Jia; Nur Liyana Nadirah; Ong Ee Theng; Wong Mei Teng	22.4000	22.0000	28.6667	73.0667
3rd place, bronze medalist(s)	Indonesia	Amara Cinthia Gebby; Anisa Feritrianti; Claudia Megawati Suyanto; Iin Rahmadhania; Maharani Sekar Langit; Naima Syeeda Sharita; Nurfa Nurul Utama; Petra Septaria Puspa Melati; Pratiwi Adhiati Kusumawardani; Visky Sekar Floreta Pribadi	21.2000	21.2000	29.0667	71.4667
4	Thailand	Pitchaya Tanamun; Karima Poolprasat; Jirachaya Santisatitpong; Voranan Toomchay; Supitchaya Songpan; Lapus Jaroenmaksuwan; Pongpimporn Pongsuwan; Thanyakorn Chaowalitthawil; Sanitpim Santawee	19.8000	19.9000	25.7333	65.4333
