= Indoor hockey at the 2017 SEA Games – Women's tournament =

2017 women's indoor hockey tournament

SEA Games Men's Indoor Hockey Tournament
Tournament details
- Host country: Malaysia
- City: Segambut
- Dates: 21 – 25 August 2017
- Teams: 5
- Venue: MATRADE Exhibition and Convention Centre

Final positions
- Champions: Thailand (THA)
- Runner-up: Indonesia (INA)
- Third place: Malaysia (MAS)

Tournament statistics
- Matches played: 12
- Goals scored: 77 (6.42 per match)
- Top scorer(s): (Indonesia) Annur El-Islamy (Thailand) Tikhamporn Sakunpithak (9 goals)

The women's indoor hockey tournament at the 2017 SEA Games was held from 21 to 25 August in Malaysia. In this tournament, 5 Southeast Asian teams played in the women's competition.

All matches were played at the MATRADE Exhibition and Convention Centre in Segambut.

== Competition schedule ==
The following was the competition schedule for the women's indoor hockey competitions:

G	Group stage	B	3rd place play-off	F	Final

Mon 21	Tue 22	Wed 23	Thu 24	Fri 25	
G	G	G	G	B	F

== Participating nations ==
The following five teams participated for the women's competition.

- Indonesia (INA)
- Malaysia (MAS)
- Philippines (PHI)
- Singapore (SGP)
- Thailand (THA)

== Draw ==
There was no official draw since only 5 teams participating in this competition. All teams are automatically drawn to one group.

== Results ==
- All times are Malaysia Standard Time (UTC+8).

=== Group stage ===
Pos	Team	Pld	W	D	L	GF	GA	GD	Pts	Final Result
1	Indonesia	4	3	1	0	18	1	+17	10	Advanced to Gold medal match
2	Thailand	4	3	0	1	19	2	+17	9	Advanced to Gold medal match
3	Malaysia (H)	4	2	1	1	26	4	+22	7	Advanced to Bronze medal match
4	Singapore	4	1	0	3	5	12	−7	3	Advanced to Bronze medal match
5	Philippines	4	0	0	4	0	49	−49	0	

Updated to match(es) played on 24 August 2017. Source: KL2017 Official Website
(H) Hosts

21 August 2017
12:00

Thailand	14–0	Philippines
Kanya Jantapet 9', 16'; Thanaporn Tongkham 11', 29', 39'; Tikhamporn Sakunpithak 14', 20', 21', 23', 27'; Sukanya Ritngam 17', 25', 33'; Ruenruedee Saubsing 33'	Report

Umpires:
Elena Eskina (RUS)
Ayu Zainuddin (MAS)

21 August 2017
15:00

Indonesia	4–0	Singapore
Novita Since 20'; Aulia Arindah 23'; Annur El Islamy 24', 27'	Report

Umpires:
Hafizah Nor Azman (MAS)
Ornpimol Kittiteerasopon (THA)

21 August 2017
18:00

Malaysia	19–0	Philippines
Qasidah Halimi 2', 9', 10', 20'; Ellya Ellias 2', 8', 22'; Nur Aisyah Yacoob 4', 23', 31', 32'; Nor Aniza Rahmat 6', 29', 40'; Rabiatul Mohamed 7', 11'; Safiqah Mat Isa 15', 36'; Noorain Mohd 39'	Report

Umpires:
Cathy Wright (WAL)
Tita Sari (INA)

22 August 2017
12:00

Thailand	2–0	Singapore
Thanaporn Tongkham 4', 11'	Report

Umpires:
Cathy Wright (WAL)
Ayu Zainuddin (MAS)

22 August 2017
18:00

Indonesia	1–1	Malaysia
Euis Nuraeni 9'	Report	Nur Aisyah Yacoob 23'

Umpires:
Elena Eskina (RUS)
Ornpimol Kittiteerasopon(THA)

23 August 2017
12:00

Singapore	5–0	Philippines
Nasuha Noradi 5'; Rahimah Aziz 9'; Hannah Tan 20'; Sabrina Gofar 24'; Eunice Teng 34'	Report

Umpires:
Elena Eskina (RUS)
Nor Hafizah Azman (MAS)

23 August 2017
18:00

Thailand	3–0	Malaysia
Thanaporn Tongkham 4'; Tikhamporn Sakunpithak 40'; Sukanya Ritngam 40'	Report

Umpires:
Cathy Wright (WAL)
Tita Sari (INA)

24 August 2017
10:30

Philippines	0–11	Indonesia
	Report	Annur El Islamy 2', 7', 22', 27', 33'; Rwede Sawor 17', 35'; Nuraini Sugiarti 17'; Novita Since 24', 30', 31'

Umpires:
Hafizah Azman Nor (MAS)
Ayu Zainuddin (MAS)

24 August 2017
16:30

Indonesia	2–0	Thailand
Annur El Islamy 2'; Dewi Andriani 35'	Report

Umpires:
Cathy Wright (WAL)
Elena Eskina (RUS)

24 August 2017
18:00

Malaysia	6–0	Singapore
Nur Aisyah Yaacob 2'; Rabiatul Mohamed 8'; Qasidah Halimi 23', 40'; Noorain Mohd 34', 39'	Report

Umpires:
Ornpimol Kittiteerasopon (THA)
Tita Sari (INA)

=== Bronze medal match ===
25 August 2017
16:00

Malaysia	3–1	Singapore
Nur Aisyah Yaacob 3'; Noorain Mohd 9'; Qasidah Halimi 20+'	Report	Sabrina Gofar 14'

Umpires:
Cathy Wright (WAL)
Ornpimol Kittiteerasopon (THA)

=== Gold medal match ===
25 August 2017
18:00

Indonesia	1–4	Thailand
Annur El Islamy 24'	Report	Tikhamporn Sakunpithak 20', 27', 31'; Thanaporn Tongkham 37'

Umpires:
Hafizah Azman Nor (MAS)
Elena Eskina (RUS)

== See also ==
- Men's tournament
