= 2017 Asian Archery Championships =

International archery tournament

- Host city: Dhaka, Bangladesh
- Dates: 25–30 November 2017

The 2017 Asian Archery Championships were the 20th edition of the event, and were held in Dhaka, Bangladesh from 25 to 30 November 2017.

== Medal summary ==
=== Recurve ===
Event	Gold	Silver	Bronze
Men's individual	Lee Seung-yun; South Korea	Yuki Kawata; Japan	Wang Dapeng; China
Men's team	South Korea; Kim Jong-ho; Lee Seung-yun; Lee Woo-seok	India; Atanu Das; Jayanta Talukdar; Yashdev	Malaysia; Akmal Nor Hasrin; Haziq Kamaruddin; Khairul Anuar Mohamad
Women's individual	Lee Eun-gyeong; South Korea	Choi Min-seon; South Korea	Ki Bo-bae; South Korea
Women's team	South Korea; Choi Min-seon; Ki Bo-bae; Lee Eun-gyeong	Chinese Taipei; Chang Rong-jia; Lin Chia-en; Peng Chia-mao	China; Li Jiaman; Li Xinxin; Lü Na
Mixed team	South Korea; Kim Jong-ho; Choi Min-seon	Japan; Hiroki Muto; Chinatsu Kubara	Vietnam; Chu Đức Anh; Lộc Thị Đào

=== Compound ===
Event	Gold	Silver	Bronze
Men's individual	Abhishek Verma; India	Kim Jong-ho; South Korea	Hong Sung-ho; South Korea
Men's team	South Korea; Choi Yong-hee; Kim Jong-ho; Kim Tae-yoon	India; Rajat Chauhan; Gurwinder Singh; Abhishek Verma	Chinese Taipei; Pan Yu-ping; Weng I-cheng; Yang Cheng-hsiung
Women's individual	Song Yun-soo; South Korea	Choi Bo-min; South Korea	Jyothi Surekha; India
Women's team	India; Trisha Deb; Parveena; Jyothi Surekha	South Korea; Choi Bo-min; So Chae-won; Song Yun-soo	Iran; Gisa Baibordi; Parisa Baratchi; Fereshteh Ghorbani
Mixed team	South Korea; Kim Jong-ho; So Chae-won	India; Abhishek Verma; Jyothi Surekha	Kazakhstan; Akbarali Karabayev; Diana Makarchuk

== Medal table ==
Rank	Nation	Gold	Silver	Bronze	Total
1	South Korea	8	4	2	14
2	India	2	3	1	6
3	Japan	0	2	0	2
4	Chinese Taipei	0	1	1	2
5	China	0	0	2	2
6	Iran	0	0	1	1
6	Kazakhstan	0	0	1	1
6	Malaysia	0	0	1	1
6	Vietnam	0	0	1	1
Totals (9 entries)		10	10	10	30
