= Diananda Choirunisa =

Indonesian recurve archer (born 1997)

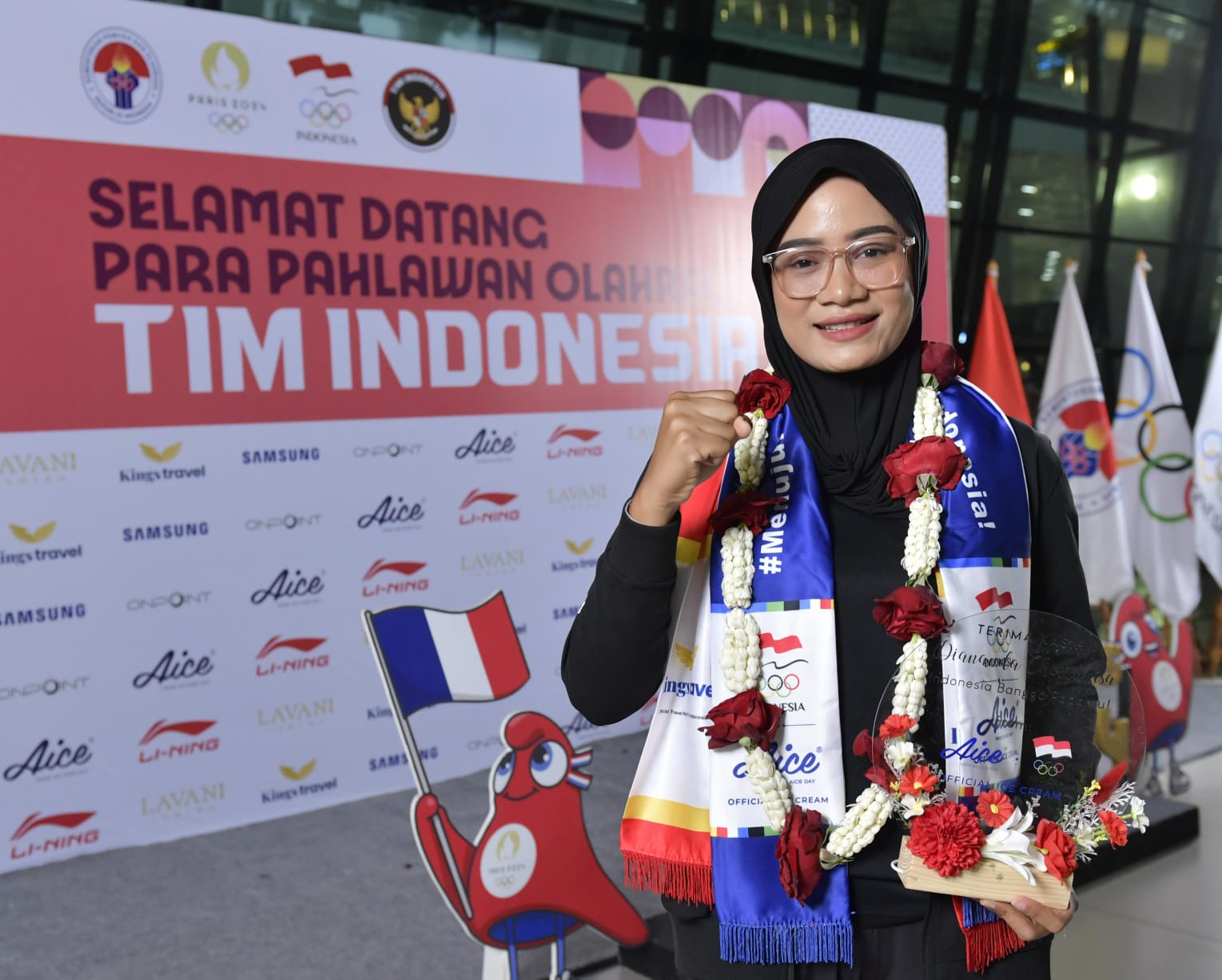

Personal information
- Full name: Diananda Choirunisa
- Nickname: Dian/Nisa
- Born: 16 March 1997 (age 29) Surabaya, East Java, Indonesia
- Education: Airlangga University
- Height: 172 cm (5 ft 8 in)
- Weight: 64 kg (141 lb)

Sport
- Country: Indonesia
- Sport: Archery
- Event: Recurve
Medal record
Women's recurve archery
Representing Indonesia
World Cup
Bronze medal – third place	2018 Shanghai	Mixed team
Asian Games
Silver medal – second place	2018 Jakarta–Palembang	Individual
Bronze medal – third place	2022 Hangzhou	Mixed team
Asia Cup
Gold medal – first place	2025 Singapore	Women's team
Silver medal – second place	2018 Bangkok	Mixed team
Silver medal – second place	2025 Singapore	Individual
Silver medal – second place	2026 Hangzhou	Mixed team
Bronze medal – third place	2018 Bangkok	Women's team
Asian Grand Prix
Silver medal – second place	2015 Bangkok	Women's team
Bronze medal – third place	2013 Bangkok	Women's team
Islamic Solidarity Games
Silver medal – second place	2013 Palembang	Individual
Silver medal – second place	2013 Palembang	Women's team
SEA Games
Gold medal – first place	2013 Naypyidaw	Women's team
Gold medal – first place	2017 Kuala Lumpur	Individual
Gold medal – first place	2017 Kuala Lumpur	Mixed team
Gold medal – first place	2025 Thailand	Individual
Gold medal – first place	2025 Thailand	Women's team
Silver medal – second place	2015 Singapore	Women's team
Silver medal – second place	2017 Kuala Lumpur	Women's team
Silver medal – second place	2019 Philippines	Mixed team
Bronze medal – third place	2019 Philippines	Women's team

Diananda Choirunisa (born 16 March 1997) is an Indonesian recurve archer. She competed in the individual recurve event and the team recurve event at the 2015 World Archery Championships in Copenhagen, Denmark.

== Career ==
In 2013 she made her international debut at age 15 at the Asian Grand Prix Bangkok with a bronze medal in the women's team. In the same year she won silver in individual and silver in women's team at the 2013 Islamic Solidarity Games in Palembang, and gold in women's team at the 2013 SEA Games in Naypyidaw.

In 2015 she represented Indonesia at the World Archery Championships in Copenhagen, Denmark, in individual and team events. That year she also won silver in women's team at the Asian Grand Prix Bangkok and silver in women's team at the 2015 SEA Games in Singapore.

In 2016 she won a gold medal at the National Sports Week for East Java. Her highest achievement in Southeast Asia was at the 2017 SEA Games in Kuala Lumpur with two gold medals in individual and mixed team, and silver in women's team.

In 2018 she won bronze in mixed team at the Archery World Cup Shanghai, silver in mixed team and bronze in women's team at the Asia Cup Bangkok, and silver in individual at the 2018 Asian Games in Jakarta–Palembang. This medal made her the first Indonesian women's archer to win silver in individual recurve in Asian Games history.

At the 2019 SEA Games in the Philippines she won silver in mixed team and bronze in women's team. In 2020 she was temporarily removed from national training, but returned through national selection in April 2021 and became champion in women's recurve. She represented Indonesia at the Tokyo 2020 Summer Olympics and ranked 40th in the ranking round with a score of 631, before being eliminated in the round of 64 against Maja Jager of Denmark with a score of 2–6.

At the 2021 National Sports Week in Papua, she won gold in individual recurve by defeating Rezza Octavia 6–5 and gold in women's team. At the 2022 Asian Games in Hangzhou she won bronze in mixed team, which secured her ticket to the Paris 2024 Olympics. At the Paris 2024 Summer Olympics she made history as the first Indonesian women's archer to reach the quarterfinals in individual.

At the 2024 National Sports Week Aceh–North Sumatra she swept three gold medals in women's individual by defeating Syifa Nurafifah Kamal of West Java 6–0, women's team, and mixed team. The medals were dedicated to her daughter who was two years old at the time and accompanied her in Aceh.

At the 2025 Asia Cup in Singapore, she won a gold medal in the women's team recurve with Ayu Mareta Dyasari and Rezza Octavia after defeating China 6–2. In the women's individual recurve, she won a silver medal after a narrow loss to Menting Yu of China with a final score of 4–6 in the fifth set. At the 2025 SEA Games in Thailand, she won two gold medals. The first gold in women's team recurve with Rezza Octavia and Ayu Mareta Dyasari. The second gold in women's individual recurve after defeating Triệu Huyền Điệp of Vietnam 6–4 in the final.

== Personal life ==
Choirunisa comes from a family with an archery background. Her mother, Ratih Widyanti, is a former national archery athlete, while her father is Zainuddin. Her interest in archery developed from an early age under her mother's guidance, and she began holding a bow at the age of seven. She married Danie Pratama in 2021 a member of the Indonesian National Armed Forces who is also an archery coach and athlete. The marriage took place in 2021. From this marriage, Choirunisa was blessed with a daughter.

As a form of state appreciation for her contribution, Choirunisa was appointed as a Civil Servant within the Ministry of Youth and Sports through the outstanding athlete pathway. This is part of a government program to secure the future of athletes who have contributed medals in official international sporting events.

On social media, she is active through her official Instagram account @dianandach, where she often shares her training process, motivational messages about the importance of mental health, and her role as both a mother and an athlete. She is also active as an ambassador for Indonesian archery in educational campaigns introducing archery to schools to scout new talent. She currently resides in Surabaya and is still registered as an athlete for East Java and the Indonesian National Training Center.

== Awards ==
Award	Year	Category	Result	Ref.
The Game Changer Award by Indonesian Olympic Committee	2026	Best athlete precision sports	Won	
