= Diving at the 2017 SEA Games – Results =

The diving competitions at the 2017 Southeast Asian Games in Kuala Lumpur took place at National Aquatic Centre, Bukit Jalil in Kuala Lumpur from 26 to 30 August 2017.

The 2017 Games featured competitions in thirteen events.

== Results ==
=== Individual ===
==== Men's 1 metre springboard ====
Rank	Diver	Final						
Rank	Diver	Dive 1	Dive 2	Dive 3	Dive 4	Dive 5	Dive 6	Points
1st place, gold medalist(s)	Ahmad Amsyar Azman (MAS)	62.40	57.00	55.50	71.30	69.00	68.80	384.00
2nd place, silver medalist(s)	Ooi Tze Liang (MAS)	63.70	55.90	28.50	76.50	67.50	76.50	368.60
3rd place, bronze medalist(s)	Mark Lee Han Ming (SGP)	49.45	67.50	65.10	53.30	48.00	67.20	350.55
4	Timothy Lee Han Kuan (SGP)	46.00	64.50	46.50	61.10	70.50	38.40	327.00
5	Tri Anggoro Priambodo (INA)	54.25	53.30	42.00	51.00	48.30	39.60	288.45
6	Aldinsyah Putra Rafi (INA)	53.30	61.20	42.00	36.80	40.50	49.50	283.30
7	Dương Văn Thành (VIE)	39.00	22.50	34.50	24.00	40.30	42.50	202.80

==== Women's 1 metre springboard ====
Rank	Diver	Final					
Rank	Diver	Dive 1	Dive 2	Dive 3	Dive 4	Dive 5	Points
1st place, gold medalist(s)	Cheong Jun Hoong (MAS)	55.20	49.45	45.60	55.90	62.40	268.55
2nd place, silver medalist(s)	Jasmine Lai Pui Yee (MAS)	50.40	48.10	44.00	46.80	43.70	233.00
3rd place, bronze medalist(s)	Ngô Phương Mai (VIE)	36.40	41.40	43.20	46.80	40.00	207.80
4	Ashlee Tan Yi Xuan (SGP)	40.80	46.80	40.25	40.95	28.60	197.40
5	Della Dinarsari Harimurti (INA)	35.70	42.90	44.85	40.80	26.35	190.60
6	Eka Purnama Indah (INA)	43.70	28.80	49.20	32.50	34.65	188.85

==== Men's 3 metre springboard ====
Rank	Diver	Final						
Rank	Diver	Dive 1	Dive 2	Dive 3	Dive 4	Dive 5	Dive 6	Points
1st place, gold medalist(s)	Ooi Tze Liang (MAS)	74.40	74.25	78.75	64.60	81.00	85.00	458.00
2nd place, silver medalist(s)	Ahmad Amsyar Azman (MAS)	72.85	63.00	62.90	70.00	81.60	81.90	432.25
3rd place, bronze medalist(s)	Timothy Lee Han Kuan (SGP)	67.50	69.75	63.00	54.00	67.50	64.60	386.35
4	Mark Lee Han Ming (SGP)	69.00	65.10	58.50	64.50	64.50	56.10	377.70
5	Adityo Restu Putra (INA)	58.50	65.10	52.70	54.00	49.50	56.10	335.90
6	Aldinsyah Putra Rafi (INA)	54.00	63.55	42.50	46.50	54.00	54.00	314.55

==== Women's 3 metre springboard ====
Rank	Diver	Final					
Rank	Diver	Dive 1	Dive 2	Dive 3	Dive 4	Dive 5	Points
DQ	Ng Yan Yee (MAS)	66.00	74.40	57.00	72.00	73.50	342.90
(gold)	Nur Dhabitah Sabri (MAS)	54.00	69.75	67.50	48.00	72.00	311.25
3rd place, bronze medalist(s)	Ashlee Tan Yi Xuan (SGP)	36.75	57.40	60.00	32.20	47.25	233.60
4	Eka Purnama Indah (INA)	51.30	46.80	50.40	58.80	22.80	230.10
5	Fong Kay Yian (SGP)	44.55	25.20	24.00	49.00	36.00	178.75
6	Maria Natalie Dinda Anasti (INA)	36.00	43.20	32.40	33.00	16.50	161.10

==== Men's 10 metre platform ====
Rank	Diver	Final						
Rank	Diver	Dive 1	Dive 2	Dive 3	Dive 4	Dive 5	Dive 6	Points
1st place, gold medalist(s)	Ooi Tze Liang (MAS)	76.80	75.20	63.00	80.85	74.80	72.00	442.65
2nd place, silver medalist(s)	Chew Yiwei (MAS)	73.60	75.00	70.40	45.90	74.25	73.60	412.75
3rd place, bronze medalist(s)	Jonathan Chan Fan Keng (SGP)	54.00	62.40	53.20	75.90	72.00	50.40	367.90
4	Conrad Joseph Lewandowski (THA)	51.80	55.10	63.00	60.20	59.20	45.60	334.90
5	Nguyễn Tùng Dương (VIE)	50.70	43.50	55.80	43.20	48.75	42.00	283.95
6	Zam Myo Htet (MYA)	41.40	57.40	38.00	41.40	31.50	38.85	248.55

==== Women's 10 metre platform ====
Rank	Diver	Final					
Rank	Diver	Dive 1	Dive 2	Dive 3	Dive 4	Dive 5	Points
1st place, gold medalist(s)	Pandelela Rinong (MAS)	73.50	68.15	57.60	72.00	70.40	341.65
2nd place, silver medalist(s)	Freida Lim (SGP)	49.00	66.00	53.65	42.00	64.00	274.65
3rd place, bronze medalist(s)	Kimberly Bong (MAS)	58.50	64.40	35.10	48.60	48.45	255.05
4	Myra Lee Jia Wen (SGP)	58.80	54.00	21.45	50.75	56.00	241.00
5	Titiporn Tonapho (THA)	43.40	27.00	42.90	40.60	33.35	187.25

=== Synchronised ===
==== Men's synchronised 3 metre springboard ====
Rank	Divers	Final						
Rank	Divers	Dive 1	Dive 2	Dive 3	Dive 4	Dive 5	Dive 6	Points
1st place, gold medalist(s)	Malaysia; Ahmad Amsyar Azman; Chew Yiwei	49.20	51.60	63.90	73.44	75.33	85.68	399.15
2nd place, silver medalist(s)	Singapore; Mark Lee Han Ming; Timothy Lee Han Kuan	48.60	45.60	67.50	64.17	68.40	74.46	368.73
3rd place, bronze medalist(s)	Indonesia; Adityo Restu Putra; Tri Anggoro Priambodo	45.00	42.00	63.00	61.20	54.90	60.30	326.40

==== Women's synchronised 3 metre springboard ====
Rank	Divers	Final					
Rank	Divers	Dive 1	Dive 2	Dive 3	Dive 4	Dive 5	Points
DQ	Malaysia; Ng Yan Yee; Nur Dhabitah Sabri	47.40	48.00	68.40	71.61	69.30	304.71
(gold)	Singapore; Ashlee Tan Yi Xuan; Fong Kay Yian	41.40	43.80	56.70	45.36	49.50	236.76
3rd place, bronze medalist(s)	Indonesia; Eka Purnama Indah; Linadini Yasmin	43.80	42.00	49.68	48.60	39.48	223.56
4	Vietnam; Ngo Phuong Mai; Nguyen Phuong Anh	38.40	40.80	51.12	46.17	42.84	219.33

==== Men's synchronised 10 metre platform ====
Rank	Divers	Final						
Rank	Divers	Dive 1	Dive 2	Dive 3	Dive 4	Dive 5	Dive 6	Points
1st place, gold medalist(s)	Malaysia; Hanis Nazirul; Jellson Jabilin	48.00	53.40	63.00	73.80	72.96	72.96	384.12
2nd place, silver medalist(s)	Indonesia; Adityo Restu Putra; Andriyan	48.00	46.80	64.80	68.16	71.04	65.34	364.14
3rd place, bronze medalist(s)	Singapore; Jonathan Chan Fan Keng; Joshua James Chong	48.00	46.80	60.30	69.12	46.20	70.08	340.50
4	Thailand; Theerapat Siriboon; Yotsawat Juntaphadawon	45.60	43.80	52.80	59.40	45.24	61.44	308.28

==== Women's synchronised 10 metre platform ====
Rank	Divers	Final					
Rank	Divers	Dive 1	Dive 2	Dive 3	Dive 4	Dive 5	Points
1st place, gold medalist(s)	Malaysia; Leong Mun Yee; Traisy Vivien Tukiet	49.20	50.40	64.68	61.20	74.88	300.36
2nd place, silver medalist(s)	Singapore; Freida Lim; Myra Lee Jia Wen	49.20	46.20	62.16	53.07	46.08	256.71
3rd place, bronze medalist(s)	Thailand; Surincha Booranapol; Titiporn Tonapho	42.60	39.60	54.60	51.30	45.24	233.34
4	Indonesia; Linar Betliana; Dewi Setyaningsih	40.20	39.00	52.92	46.80	45.24	224.16

==== Mixed synchronised 3 metre springboard ====
Rank	Divers	Final					
Rank	Divers	Dive 1	Dive 2	Dive 3	Dive 4	Dive 5	Points
1st place, gold medalist(s)	Malaysia; Muhammad Syafiq Puteh; Jasmine Lai Pui Yee	47.40	44.40	64.80	69.30	59.04	284.94
2nd place, silver medalist(s)	Singapore; Joshua James Chong; Ashlee Tan Yi Xuan	45.00	43.20	38.64	60.30	56.70	243.84
3rd place, bronze medalist(s)	Vietnam; Vu Anh Duy; Ngô Phương Mai	43.20	41.40	48.24	49.41	52.20	234.45
4	Indonesia; Andriyan; Della Dinarsari Harimurti	43.80	41.40	42.48	49.50	54.00	231.18

==== Mixed synchronised 10 metre platform ====
Rank	Divers	Final					
Rank	Divers	Dive 1	Dive 2	Dive 3	Dive 4	Dive 5	Points
1st place, gold medalist(s)	Malaysia; Jellson Jabilin; Leong Mun Yee	49.20	48.60	66.36	72.90	74.88	311.94
2nd place, silver medalist(s)	Singapore; Jonathan Chan Fan Keng; Freida Lim	45.60	49.20	59.64	57.60	66.24	278.28
3rd place, bronze medalist(s)	Indonesia; Andriyan; Della Dinarsari Harimurti	42.60	38.40	51.48	50.40	61.44	244.32
4	Thailand; Conrad Joseph Lewandowski; Surincha Booranapol	43.20	42.60	56.28	47.70	47.58	237.36

==== Team event ====
Rank	Divers	Final			
Rank	Divers	Dive 1	Dive 2	Dive 3	Points
1st place, gold medalist(s)	Malaysia; Gabriel Gilbert Daim; Pandelela Rinong	83.00	139.50	122.90	345.40
2nd place, silver medalist(s)	Singapore; Jonathan Chan Fan Keng; Freida Lim	83.00	115.95	136.60	335.55
3rd place, bronze medalist(s)	Thailand; Theerapat Siriboon; Surincha Booranapol	72.00	85.50	86.40	243.90
4	Indonesia; Akhmad Sukran Jamjani; Della Dinarsari Harimurti	92.00	63.00	78.80	233.80
5	Vietnam; Nguyễn Tùng Dương; Nguyễn Vũ Thảo Quỳnh	67.00	71.40	74.05	212.45
