= Tan Si Lie =

Singaporean archer

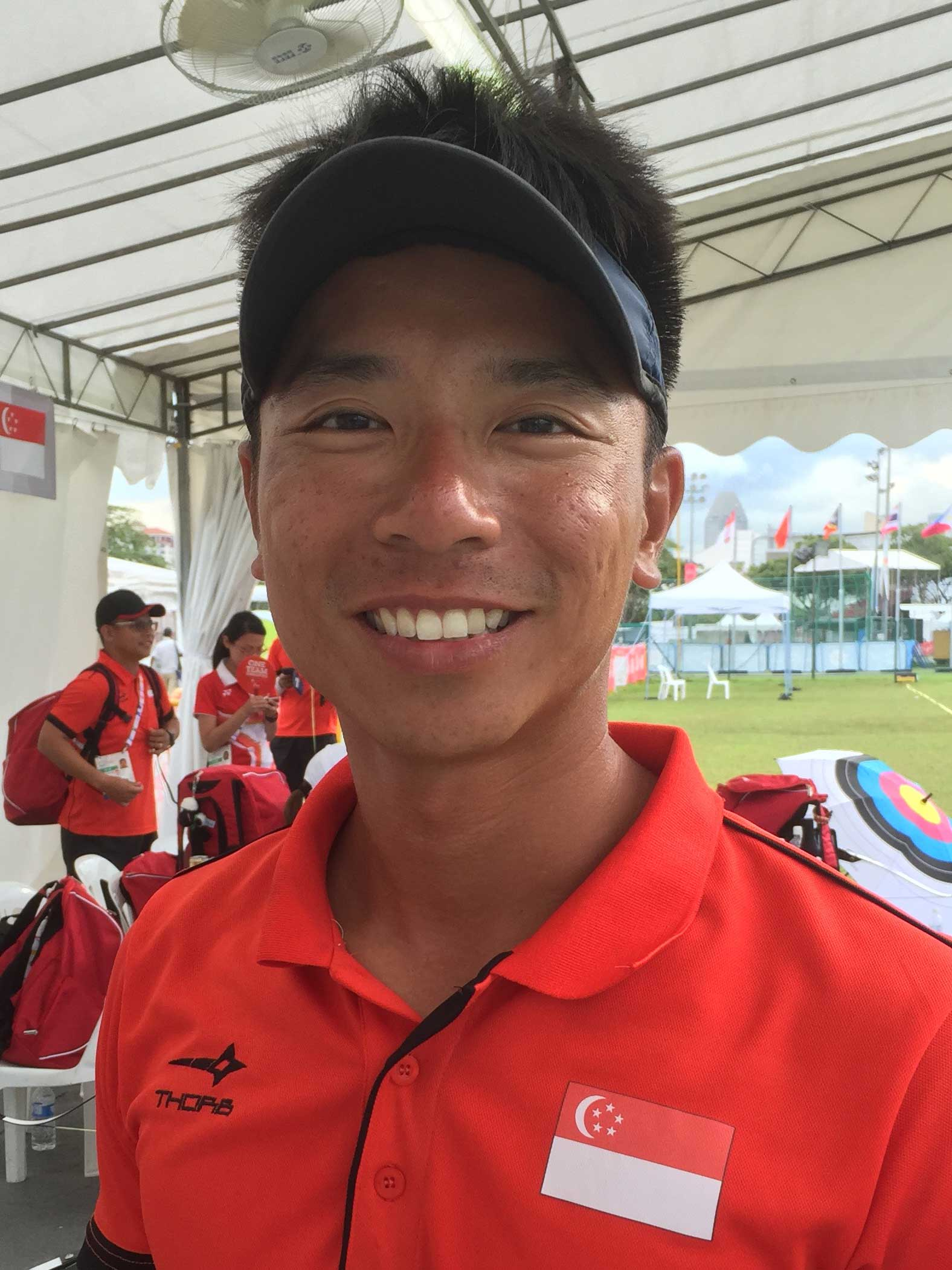

Personal information
- Full name: Tan Si Lie
- Nickname: Si Lie
- Nationality: Singaporean
- Born: 3 March 1989 (age 37)
- Height: 1.71 m (5 ft 7 in)
- Weight: 68 kg (150 lb)

Sport
- Country: Singapore
- Sport: Archery
- Event: Recurve
- Coached by: Choi Mijin

Achievements and titles
- Highest world ranking: 115 (28 Aug 2014)
Medal record
Representing Singapore
Southeast Asian Games
Silver medal – second place	2013 Naypyidaw	Mixed Team
Bronze medal – third place	2015 Singapore	Men's Individual
Bronze medal – third place	2015 Singapore	Men's Team
- Updated on 04:49, 18 June 2015 (UTC)

Tan Si Lie (born 3 March 1989) is a Singaporean archer. He represented Singapore at the 2015 Southeast Asian Games.

== 2015 Southeast Asian Games ==
At the 2015 Southeast Asian Games he competed for his country in the Men's individual event, Men's team event, and Mixed team event.

Si Lie made it to the bronze medal matches of the events he entered in and won the men's individual bronze medal and men's team bronze medal.
