= Saritha Cham Nong =

Malaysian archer (born 1988)

Personal information
- National team: 2015
- Born: 12 September 1988 (age 37) Sarawak, Malaysia

Sport
- Country: Malaysia
- Sport: Archery
- Event: Compound
Medal record
Women's compound archery
Representing Malaysia
Asian Championships
Silver medal – second place	2011 Tehran	Team
Bronze medal – third place	2015 Bangkok	Team

Saritha Cham Nong (born 12 September 1988) is a Malaysian female compound archer and part of the national team. She won the bronze medal at the 2015 Asian Archery Championships in the women's team event.
