= Akmal Nor Hasrin =

Malaysian archer (born 1995)

Personal information
- Full name: Muhammad Akmal bin Nor Hasrin
- Born: 15 July 1995 (age 30) Kuala Lumpur

Sport
- Country: Malaysia
- Sport: Archery
- Event: Recurve
Medal record
Men's recurve archery
Representing Malaysia
Asian Championships
Bronze medal – third place	2017 Dhaka	Team

Muhammad Akmal bin Nor Hasrin (born 15 July 1995) is a Malaysian professional archer. He competed in the archery competition at the 2016 Summer Olympics in Rio de Janeiro.
