= Khairul Anuar Mohamad =

Malaysian archer (born 1991)

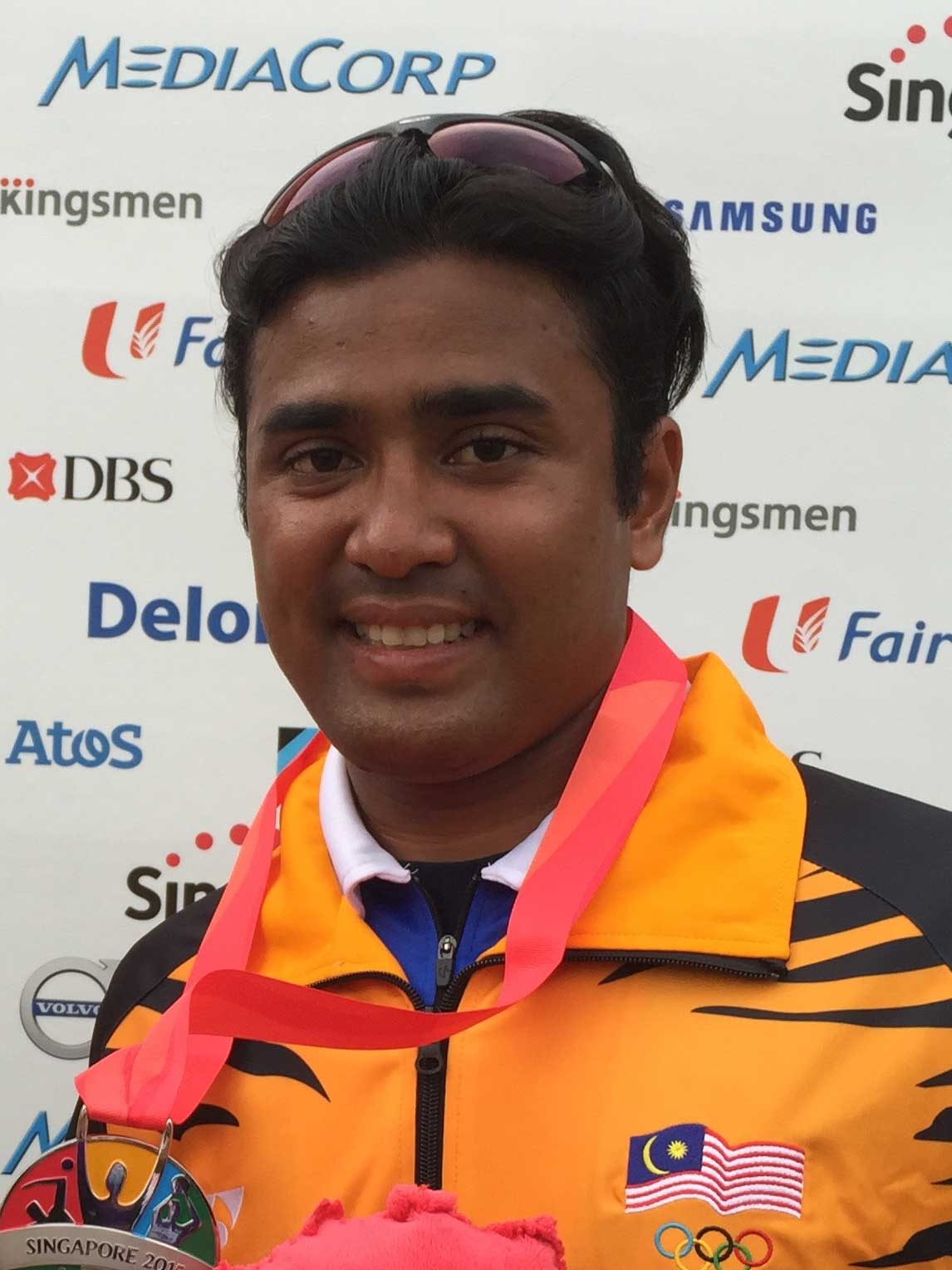

Personal information
- Full name: Khairul Anuar bin Mohamad
- Nickname: Khairul
- Nationality: Malaysian
- Born: 22 September 1991 (age 35) Kemaman, Terengganu, Malaysia
- Height: 1.72 m (5 ft 8 in)
- Weight: 76 kg (168 lb)

Sport
- Country: Malaysia
- Sport: Archery
- Event: Recurve
- Club: Terengganu
- Coached by: Lee Jae Hyung, Norizam Ishak

Achievements and titles
- Olympic finals: 2012 London - 1/8 Finals (Ind)
- Highest world ranking: 3 (9 July 2013)
Medal record
Representing Malaysia
World Championships
Silver medal – second place	2019 's-Hertogenbosch	Individual
Asian Games
Silver medal – second place	2014 Incheon	Men's team
Asian Championships
Gold medal – first place	2011 Tehran	Individual
Gold medal – first place	2011 Tehran	Men's team
Bronze medal – third place	2017 Dhaka	Men's team
Southeast Asian Games
Gold medal – first place	2011 Jakarta	Men's team
Gold medal – first place	2013 Naypyidaw	Individual
Gold medal – first place	2013 Naypyidaw	Men's team
Gold medal – first place	2015 Singapore	Men's team
Gold medal – first place	2017 Kuala Lumpur	Men's team
Silver medal – second place	2011 Jakarta	Individual
Silver medal – second place	2015 Singapore	Mixed team
Silver medal – second place	2017 Kuala Lumpur	Individual
Silver medal – second place	2019 Philippines	Men's team
Silver medal – second place	2021 Hanoi	Mixed team
Bronze medal – third place	2019 Philippines	Mixed team
Bronze medal – third place	2021 Hanoi	Men's team
Bronze medal – third place	2021 Hanoi	Individual

Khairul Anuar bin Mohamad (born 22 September 1991) is a Malaysian professional archer. He began to compete for the national team in 2011.

== 2011 FITA Archery World Cup ==
Khairul participated in the 2011 FITA Archery World Cup Stage 4 in Shanghai, China in what was only his third international tournament. He became the first Malaysian to ever win a medal at an individual World Cup event when he was defeated in the finals of the men's individual recurve event by American Joe Fanchin.

== 2011 Asian Archery Championships ==
He was part of the Malaysian contingent at the 2011 Asian Archery Championships in Tehran, Iran which came away two gold medals and two silver medals. Khairul contributed towards both gold medals. He defeated Hideki Kikuchi of Japan 6–2 in the final of the men's individual event and was part of the Malaysian team which defeated China 187–184 in the final of the men's team event.

== 2012 Summer Olympics ==
At the 2012 Summer Olympics he competed for his country in the Men's individual event and the Men's team event. Khairul made it to the quarter-final stage of the individual event, where he was stopped by eventual silver-medallist Takaharu Furukawa of Japan, while the Malaysian team lost in the first round.

== 2016 Summer Olympics ==
Khairul earned his spot in men's individual event after winning the Continental Quota Tournament (CQT) in Bangkok. He lost to Germany's Florian Floto, Khairul won the first two sets 27-26 and 27–23 before Floto took the next three sets 29–27, 28-25 and 30-29 (4–6). He also took part in team events where they lost to France (2–6).

== 2019 World Championships ==
At the 2019 World Championships, Khairul reached the final, where he lost to World number one Brady Ellison. The final required a tie-break after the fifth set for the winner to be decided, with the first three sets having been tied, and then the archers winning one set each. It was the first archery World Championship medal won by a Malaysian archer. This silver medal also secured a place for a Malaysian archer at the 2020 Summer Olympics. Following his performance at the World Championships, Khairul was shortlisted for World Archery's Male Athlete of the year for recurve archers.

== 2020 Summer Olympics ==
At the 2020 Summer Olympics, he participated in the men's individual event and the mixed team event with Syaqiera Mashayikh.

== Honours ==
- Terengganu
  - Recipient of the Meritorious Service Medal (PJK) (2012)
