= Witthaya Thamwong =

Thai archer (born 1987)

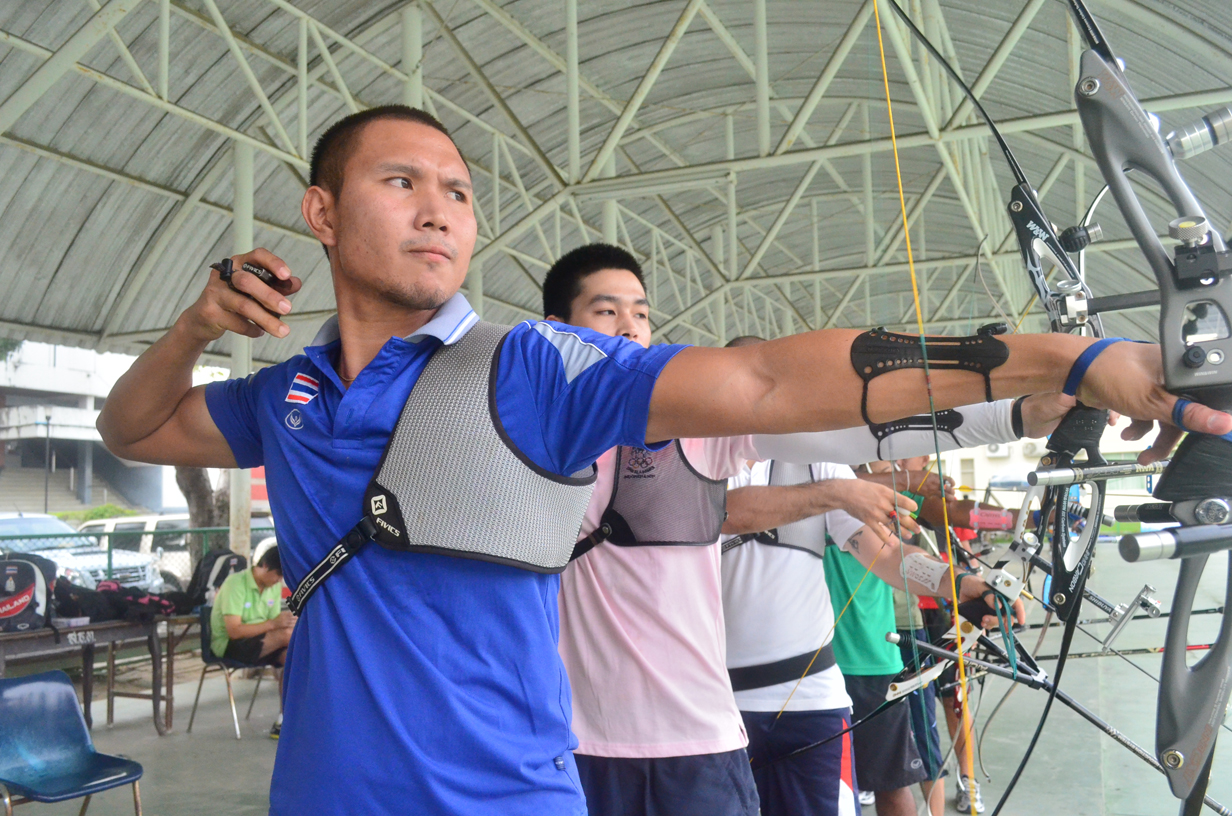
Witthaya Thamwong

Witthaya Thamwong (Thai: วิทยา ทำว่อง; born 18 September 1987 in Lampang, Thailand) is a Thai archer. He competed in the individual event at the 2012 Summer Olympics.
