= 2017 SEA Games opening ceremony =

2017 Southeast Asian Games Opening Ceremony
- Date: 19 August 2017
- Time: 20:00 - 22:00 MST (UTC+08:00) (2 hours)
- Location: Bukit Jalil National Stadium, Bukit Jalil, Kuala Lumpur, Malaysia
- Also known as: Rising Together
- Filmed by: SGTV (On behalf of Radio Televisyen Malaysia and Astro Malaysia
- Footage: The Opening Ceremony of the 29th Southeast Asian Games on YouTube

The 2017 Southeast Asian Games opening ceremony was held in Bukit Jalil National Stadium on 19 August 2017 at 20:17 MST (UTC+8) which highlighted aspects of Malaysia's history and culture. The ceremony was directed by film director Saw Teong Hin alongside the Memories Entertainment creative team with co-operation from the Malaysian Armed Forces. The time 20:17 was chosen to start the opening ceremony to mark the year 2017, the year which Malaysia hosted the 29th Southeast Asian Games.

== Proceedings ==
=== Welcome, national flag and anthem ===
The opening ceremony begin with the arrival of the Yang di-Pertuan Agong of Malaysia, Sultan Muhammad V. Flag of Malaysia was raised of the Malaysia national anthem, Negaraku was instrumental by Malaysian Armed Forces band.

=== Countdown ===
This was followed by the footage of few Malaysians of different ages and races paint their face with the colours of the games logo and a ten-to-one countdown of the large screens counted down from 10 to 1 after the playing of the national anthem, the word "Selamat Datang" (Welcome) was projected onto the seats of the stadium with fireworks being released around the stadium to mark the beginning of the ceremony.

=== Main event ===
==== Preface ====
320 Malaysian flags, along with the national flags of the participating nations, the Southeast Asian Games Federation flag and the edition flag, were brought into the stadium to symbolise the welcoming of the participants by Malaysia's 32 million population while Monoloque and Azlan Typewriter performed "Tunjuk Belang" on the stage. "Rimau", the mascot of the Games then entered the stadium after a video footage made by computer graphics showing a tiger running across Kuala Lumpur and Putrajaya from the National Stadium, passing through landmarks such as Petronas Towers, Kuala Lumpur Tower, Telekom Tower, Sultan Abdul Samad Building and the Putrajaya Bridge.

==== Parade of Nations ====
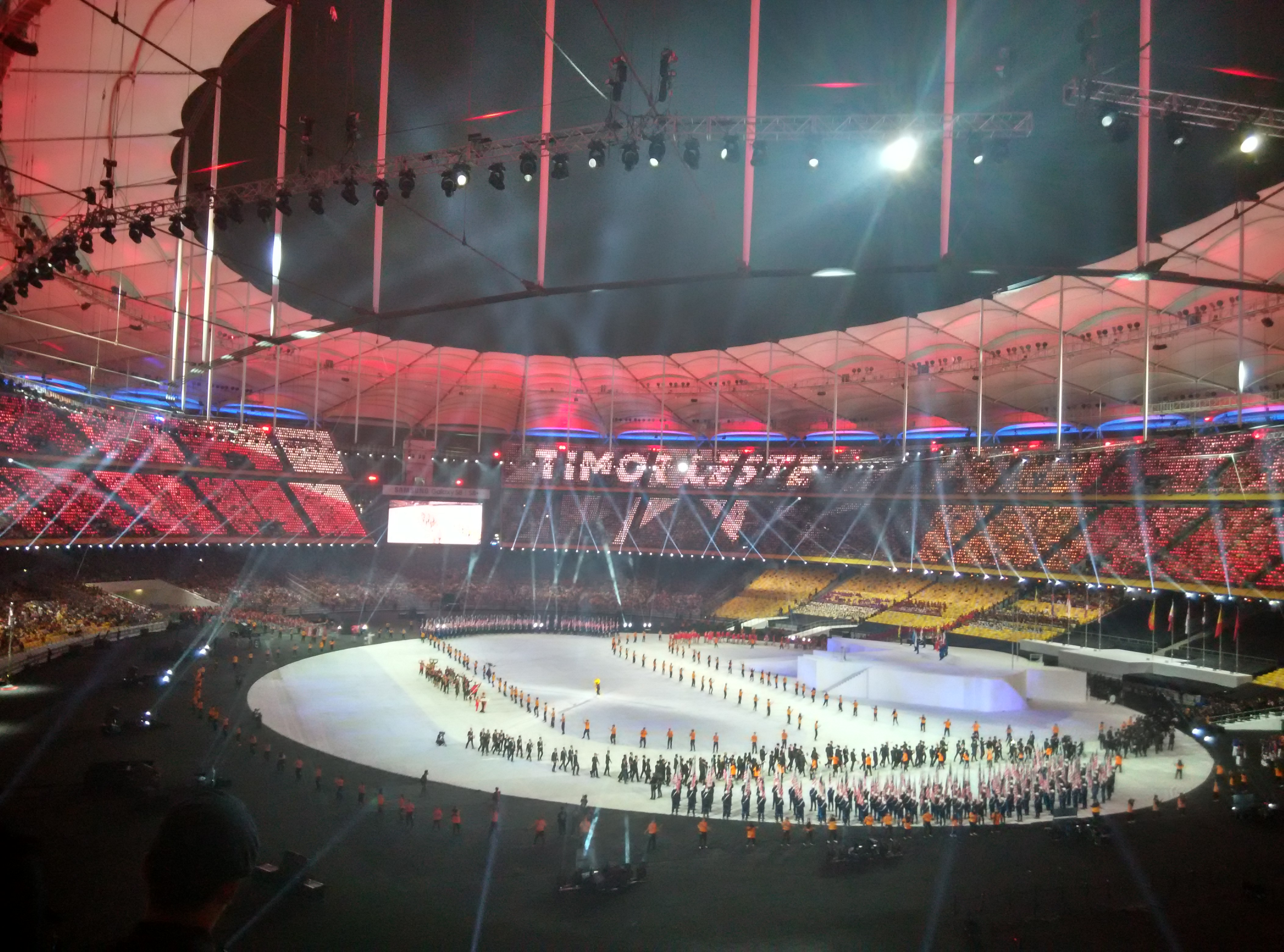
Parade of Nations at the Opening Ceremony of the 29th Southeast Asian Games.

As per Southeast Asian Games Federation (SEAGF) protocol, the parade of athletes from all 11 competing nations started with Brunei leading the field in English alphabetical order and ended with the host nation, Malaysia entering the stadium last. When the athletes entering the stadium, the name and the flag of their participating nations were projected onto the seats of the stadium. The parade concluded with the performance of the song "Bangkit Bersama" by Sarawakian singer Dayang Nurfaizah.

Order	Nation	Flag bearer/s	Sport
1	Brunei (BRU) (Brunei Darussalam)	Mohammad Adi Salihin	Wushu
2	Cambodia (CAM)	Riem Sokphirom	Sepak takraw
3	Indonesia (INA)	I Gede Siman Sudartawa	Swimming
4	Laos (LAO) (Lao PDR)	Khamvarn Vanlivong	Archery
5	Myanmar (MYA)	Aung Myo Swe	Sepak takraw
6	Philippines (PHI)	Kirstie Elaine Alora	Taekwondo
7	Singapore (SGP)	Jasmine Ser	Shooting
8	Thailand (THA)	Pornchai Kaokaew	Sepak takraw
9	Timor-Leste (TLS) (Timor-Leste)	Liliana Da Costa	Athletics
10	Vietnam (VIE)	Vũ Thành An	Fencing
11	Malaysia (MAS)	Azizulhasni Awang; Cheong Jun Hoong; Mohd Al-Jufferi Jamari	Cycling; Diving; Pencak silat

The 1980 Malaysian footballers James Wong, Santokh Singh and Shukor Salleh led the former athletes who carried the Games Federation flag and the games edition flag into the stadium which were raised by Malaysian Army Personnel. The Federation flag was carried by Shalin Zulkifli, Ramachandran Munusamy, Nurul Huda Abdullah, Rabuan Pit, Sharon Low Su Lin, Rashid Sidek, Zaiton Othman and Jeffrey Ong Kuan Seng, while the Games Edition Flag was carried by Shanti Govindasamy, Shahrulneeza Razali, Elaine Teo Shueh Fern, Nur Herman Majid, Norsham Yoon, R. Jaganathan, Choo Yih Hwa and Nasri Nasir.

==== Speeches and protocols ====
In keeping with tradition, welcoming speeches were given by the President of the Southeast Asian Games Federation Tunku Imran and Malaysia's Youth and Sports Minister Khairy Jamaluddin. After that, the Games were officially declared open by the then Yang di-Pertuan Agong of Malaysia, Sultan Muhammad V. Later, Malaysian high jumper Nauraj Singh Randhawa was given the honour of taking the oath of sportsmanship on behalf of the athletes whilst Vice-President of the Olympic Council of Malaysia Datuk Megat Zulkarnain Tan Sri Omardin read out the oath behalf of Games officials.

==== Main performances ====
A 20-minutes showcase of Malaysia's cultural diversity that came in four segments, "Provenance", "Similarities in Diversity", "Together We are Stronger", and "A Nation Built on Inclusion", told the story of the origins of Malaysian inhabitants, celebrated the differences of people across the country and the region, emphasised the importance of strength and endurance while the conclusion featured people coming together with differences and similarities on full display. Singer Mia Palencia performed the song "So Many Hands", one of the three theme songs of the Games. A total of 6,000 people were involved in the showcase consisting of performers, volunteers, children and members of the armed forces.

==== Torch lighting ====
A video about the nationwide torch relay held months after the region's baton relay and months before the games was shown. After that, the torch of the Games was carried into the stadium by five group of Malaysia's former and current generation of sportsmen and sportswomen, each with three person: 1 former sportsman and 2 current sportsmen. The torch bearers are: Siti Safiyah, Kenny Ang and Muhammad Rafiq Ismail of bowling, Mohd Shah Firdaus, Ng Joo Ngan and Fatehah Mustapa of cycling, Mohd Faizal Shaari, Mirnawan Nawawi and Hanis Nadihah Onn of Hockey, Khairul Hafiz Jantan, Mohd Zaki Sadri and Khirtana Ramasamy of athletics, Chan Peng Soon, Razif Sidek and Goh Jin Wei of Badminton. Bryan Nickson Lomas and Pandelela Rinong of Diving passed the torch to rising diving star Nur Dhabitah Sabri, who then was suspended by wires and at a distance, she lit the cauldron afterwards. The cauldron's design was inspired by the traditional Malaysian oil torches used to welcome guests during festivals, and was to symbolise national unity. It had five spokes inscribed with the Rukun Negara and the colour gold served to honour Malaysia's monarch, as well as a nod to the highest award at the biennial games. A colourful fireworks display then erupted over the National Stadium, signalling the official commencement of the Games. The opening ceremony ended with the Yang di-Pertuan Agong leaving the stadium and Malaysia national anthem, Negaraku was instrumental by Malaysian Armed Forces band for the second time.

== Performers ==
- Monoloque and Azlan Typewriter - (performing "Tunjuk Belang" (Show the Stripes)
- Dayang Nurfaizah - "(performing "Bangkit Bersama" (Rising Together)
- Mia Palencia - (performing "So Many Hands")

== Anthems ==
- (Malaysia) Malaysian Armed Forces - Negaraku, Malaysian National Anthem (Instrumental)

== Notable guests ==
- Muhammad V of Kelantan, Yang di-Pertuan Agong of Malaysia
- Khairy Jamaluddin, Minister of Youth and Sports of Malaysia
- Najib Razak, Prime Minister of Malaysia
- Ahmad Zahid Hamidi, Deputy Prime Minister of Malaysia
- Rosmah Mansor, Spouse of the Prime Minister of Malaysia
- Tunku Imran, President of Olympic Council of Malaysia
