= Concerns and controversies at the 2017 SEA Games =

There have been numerous concerns and controversies about the 2017 Southeast Asian Games, which was hosted in Kuala Lumpur, Malaysia.

== During the games ==
=== Scheduling ===
- Philippines athletics head coach Sean Guevara was furious with the scheduling of athletics programme as their athletes would compete in the same event on the same day in the space of 30 minutes in the heats and just one hour apart in 100m and 400m finals causing the Philippine Athletics Track and Field Association (PATAFA) to request for a change or adjustment to the schedule for the men's 400m hurdles and 100m, but the Malaysian organising committee did not take any action when the Olympic Council of Malaysia (OCM) secretary-general Low Beng Choo explained he had noticed the Philippine Olympic Committee (POC) appeal for the schedule to be changed but the Malaysian Athletics Technical Delegate turned the request down.
- The Singapore national under-22 football team coach Richard Tardy criticised the organisers for informing him about a press conference held on 13 August just 30 minutes prior to its scheduled 11:30am start time, causing him to be late. Thailand national under-22 football team coach Worrawoot Srimaka also failed to turn up as he was informed about the conference only after having to reschedule his team's training session.

=== Transportation issues ===
- Thailand women's national futsal team didn't get any bus to travel to the venue and Vietnam national under-22 football team were coming late to make a training at the venue because of the poor organisation from the bus management.

=== Television broadcast issues ===
- Malaysia's failure to air some of the live matches on football events also been criticised, with one football supporter from Myanmar said: “I’m surprised to learn that Malaysia, which is much richer than Myanmar, fails to manage live coverage of some popular events and tournaments. I am asking this on behalf of all other ASEAN countries, not just for Myanmar”.

=== Driver's background ===
- A Malaysian bus driver ferrying the Myanmar women's national football team was arrested for theft and for not having a driving licence, leading to a delay in the players and officials reaching their hotel.

=== Judging issues ===
- The failure of Malaysian SEA Games Organising Committee (MASOC) to fully install “video challenge” or “dark fish” system for sepak takraw matches that can be used by teams to challenge calls made by the umpire or referee during a bout or match are criticised by the national sepak takraw association itself as all ASEAN sepak takraw teams had been notified and expecting the technology to be used in the competition.
- On 20 August, Indonesian women's sepak takraw team walked out of the venue to protest a call by the referee. Following the match abandonment from the Indonesian side, the Malaysian side was awarded a 2–0 score by the referee. Later, Malaysian media claimed that Indonesia has admitted that it was a mistake to abandon the match. However, this statement was rejected by the Indonesian officials.
- During pencak silat men's doubles seni contest on 24 August, Malaysian pair Taqiyuddin Hamid and Rosli Sharif won the competition with 582 points. Indonesian coaches, whose athlete Hendy and Yolla Primadona settled for silver, claimed that the given score is not natural and biased. According to one of the coaches, the highest point ever given for the competition was around 570. However, Malaysian National Silat Federation secretary general Datuk Megat Zulkarnain Omardin has denied such claims and said that the Indonesian team had accepted the result during team manager meeting. Indonesian Minister of Youth and Sport Affairs, Imam Nahrawi, later said that he was planning on sending protest notes to the Asian Pencak Silat Federation and the Olympic Council of Asia (OCA) to prevent the referees or judges from officiating in 2018 Asian Games to be held in Indonesia.
- During Pencak Silat - Tanding Men Class D on 29 August, Malaysian athlete Razak Ghani seriously injured in the rib during a match against Thai athlete Pornteb Poolkaew causing it to be stopped definitely. The referee however gave Razak to win the match in a sudden controversial decision.
- The results of the boxing men's light flyweight quarter-final bout between Carlo Paalam of Philippines and Muhamad Fuad Redzuan of the host nation Malaysia was met with criticism as the latter was given a 5–0 decision despite being out boxed. Muhamad Fuad was also warned by the referee for illegal attacks such as take downs, headlocks and occasional lacing of his opponent's face in clinches but received only warnings and no point deductions. Association of Boxing Alliances in the Philippines (ABAP) executive director Ed Picson declined to make comment about the officiating and scoring other than to say "I thought it was the other way around. But it is what it is". However, Muhamad Fuad gets to prove his worth when he went on to win the semi-final and final bouts to take the event gold medal.
- The winner of the women's 10,000 metres walk race, Elena Goh Ling Yin from the host nation Malaysia, was accused of cheating. The Vietnamese media protested that the Malaysian athlete cheated by "running" instead of "walking", especially during the last lap to overtake Phan Thị Bích Hà from Vietnam. According to walk races' rules, athletes’ two feet are not allowed to leave the ground at the same time. The rules also state that the front leg must straighten when it makes contact with the ground. A violation may be cautioned with a yellow paddle, while repeat violations may be met with a red card. Three red cards, from three different judges, will result in a competitor's disqualification. Pictures allegedly showed Elena Goh violating both of these rules. Meanwhile, the runner-up Phan Thị Bích Hà said to the media that, "It's too frustrating. But I couldn't do anything. As a competitor, I won't make any comment. But everyone can clearly see what happened on the track".

=== Media issues ===
- An incident involving the flag of Indonesia printed upside down in the games souvenir guidebook led to a furore amongst Indonesians, with Indonesia's Olympic Committee chairman Erick Thohir accusing the Malaysian SEA Games organisers of "negligence". Indonesian President Joko Widodo called for an apology from Malaysia but cautioned Indonesian citizens against exaggerating the incident. Shortly after, the hashtag "#shameonyoumalaysia" became the most popular hashtag on Twitter on 20 August 2017. Malaysian Youth and Sports Minister Khairy Jamaluddin then met his Indonesian counterpart Imam Nahrawi at a hotel to personally apologise over the incident and assure that the guidebooks will be corrected and reprinted. The issue was resolved as the Ministers held a press conference afterwards and informed that Nahrawi had accepted Khairy's apology. Despite the apology, an Indonesian hacker group called the ExtremeCrew hacked into and vandalised several Malaysian websites with the message "Bendera Negaraku Bukanlah Mainan" (Our country's flag is not a toy).

=== Ticketing issues ===
- The allocated tickets of the Myanmar-Laos football men's group match at the UiTM Stadium which was said to be already sold out causing Myanmar fans had to support their team from outside the stadium despite there are still many empty spaces available inside the stadium as they were not allowed to enter.
- On 28 August, many Malaysians fans angered over ticket sales system at the Shah Alam Stadium for the final football match between Malaysia and Thailand. Ticket counters at the Shah Alam Stadium are only open up to 2 counters resulting in chaos and forced Federal Reserve Unit (FRU) and police to be deployed to the area to disperse the crowd involved in the chaos. Most of those involved are frustrated because they have long queues since 6am but unable to buy even one ticket as the counter had run out of ticket sales. Other Malaysian fans also criticises the ticketing system as it is not sold online. But Malaysian Minister of Youth and Sports, Khairy Jamaluddin explained that online payment gateway provider could not guarantee a stable process because of volume and they were concerned people would transact payment and not get tickets because of the sheer volume.

=== Fans' behaviour ===
- Other threats to football supporters from other Southeast Asian countries by Malaysian hooligans were also previously reported when Malaysian SEA Games organisers have called Malaysian football fans to be civil and control their behaviour as the events are based on a "strong spirit of togetherness and sportsmanship" especially after an incident where video footage had circulated in the internet showing extreme Malaysian football supporters chanting "kami turun ke Shah Alam, satu jiwa sokong Malaysia, Singapore anjing dibunuh saja" (we come to Shah Alam, united in supporting Malaysia, Singapore dogs should only be killed).

=== Food-related illness ===
- On 24 August, 16 Malaysian athletes were sick after being hit with stomach bug suspected of food poisoning.

=== Closing ceremony ===
- The Philippine Olympic Committee (POC) was under fire and criticised by netizens for the disapproval of the planned performance, sponsored by the Department of Tourism (DOT) amounting at PHP8.1 million, in the turn-over of the hosting duties to the Philippines from Malaysia for the hosting of the 2019 Southeast Asian Games in the closing ceremony. The check was given back to DOT. However, in another report, POC Commissioner Peping Cojuangco stated that the plan to have a cultural performance in the closing ceremony was scrapped as Malaysia's SEA Games Organising Committee has already laid down their program before their request was made.

== After the games ==
=== Doping ===
- It was reported on 26 October 2017 that Malaysian diver Wendy Ng Yan Yee had failed a doping test conducted at the Games. Her B sample tested positive for sibutramine, a stimulant banned by the World Anti-Doping Agency (WADA). As a consequence, Malaysia will lose the gold medal won by Wendy Ng and fellow diver Dhabitah in the 3m springboard synchronised event.
