= Anja Chong =

Singaporean figure and speed skater

Personal information
- Born: March 10, 1994 (age 32) Singapore
- Height: 166 cm (5 ft 5 in)

Sport
- Sport: Short track speed skating
Medal record
Women's short track speed skating
Representing Singapore
Asian Junior Challenge
Bronze medal – third place	2008 Hong Kong	500 m
Representing Malaysia
Southeast Asian Games
Gold medal – first place	2017 Kuala Lumpur	500 m
Gold medal – first place	2017 Kuala Lumpur	1000 m
Gold medal – first place	2017 Kuala Lumpur	3000 m relay
Gold medal – first place	2019 Philippines	3000 m relay
Bronze medal – third place	2019 Philippines	500 m

Anja Chong (born March 10, 1994) is a Singaporean-born Malaysian short track speed skater.

== Personal life ==
Chong was born and raised in Singapore, holding permanent residency (PR) in the country. She was educated at the United World College of South East Asia in Dover. Her mother, Sonja Chong, was the president of the Singapore Ice Skating Association (SISA).

Chong and her mother are both Malaysian citizens. In 2011, when Chong was 17, they attempted to apply for Singaporean citizenship after being offered a ticket by the Olympic Council of Asia to compete at the 2011 Asian Winter Games in Kazakhstan, but their applications were rejected.

She noted her disappointment, stating that "I would've stayed in Singapore because I started out here, but I had no choice. In order to compete at the Olympics, I needed citizenship." At the same time, she was also offered the spot by Malaysia, but had turned it down in the hopes of competing for Singapore. Eventually, she relented in having to represent Malaysia instead for future competitions to continue her career.

== Career ==
=== Singapore ===
==== Asian Junior Challenge ====
Prior to 2012, Chong represented the country of her birth, including the Asian Junior Challenge in 2008 that was held in Hong Kong, where she earned a bronze medal.

==== World Junior Figure Skating Championships ====
In 2009, she represented Singapore at the 2009 World Junior Figure Skating Championships.

=== Malaysia ===
==== 2017 Southeast Asian Games ====
Chong began representing Malaysia at her first SEA Games in 2017 which was held in Kuala Lumpur, where she won 3 gold medals in the 500m, 1000m and 3000m ladies relay. The sport was specifically created for that SEA Games, being the first time a winter sport was contested in SEA Games history, having only been competed by tropical countries.

One month before the SEA Games, she became the Malaysian Short Track Speed Skating National Champion, sweeping all the ladies events – the 500m and the 1000m.

==== Asian Winter Games ====
In February 2017, Anja took part in the 2017 Asian Winter Games in Sapporo. Competing in the 500m and the 1000m, she did not reach the finals, falling short in the heats.

==== 2019 Southeast Asian Games ====
In 2019, Chong competed at her second SEA Games, which was held in the Philippines. She competed in the 500m, 1000m, and the 3000m relay. Although not winning any medals for the 1000m, she did won a bronze at the 500m, with the gold going to Singapore's Cheyenne Goh, and managed to get a single gold for the 3000m relay.
