= List of Singaporean records in speed skating =

The following are the national records in speed skating in Singapore maintained by the Singapore Ice Skating Association (SISA).

== Men ==
Event	Record	Athlete	Date	Meet	Place	Ref
500 meters						
500 meters × 2						
1000 meters						
1500 meters						
3000 meters						
5000 meters						
10000 meters						
Team pursuit (8 laps)						
Sprint combination						
Small combination						
Big combination						

== Women ==
Event	Record	Athlete	Date	Meet	Place	Ref
500 meters	42.81	Cheyenne Goh	15 March 2019	Olympic Oval Finale	Calgary, Canada	
500 meters × 2						
1000 meters						
1500 meters						
3000 meters						
5000 meters						
10000 meters						
Team pursuit (6 laps)						
Sprint combination						
Mini combination						
Small combination						
