= Short-track speed skating at the 2019 SEA Games =

Short track speed skating at the 2019 SEA Games
- Short track speed skating pictogram
- Venue: SM Skating Megamall
- Location: Mandaluyong, Metro Manila, Philippines
- Dates: 3–4 December

The short track speed skating competitions at the 2019 Southeast Asian Games in the Philippines was held from 3 to 4 December 2019 at the SM Skating Megamall ice skating rink in Mandaluyong.

== Competition schedule ==
The following is the schedule for the short track speed skating competitions. All times are Philippine Standard Time (UTC+8).

Date	Time	Event	Phase
3 December 2019	17:00	Women's 500 m	Semifinal
3 December 2019	17:10	Men's 500 m	Semifinal
3 December 2019	17:20	Women's 500 m	Final
3 December 2019	17:30	Men's 500 m	Final
3 December 2019	18:00	Women's 3000 m relay	Final
4 December 2019	16:30	Men's 1000 m	Semifinal
4 December 2019	16:45	Women's 1000 m	Semifinal
4 December 2019	17:00	Men's 1000 m	Final
4 December 2019	17:15	Women's 1000 m	Final
4 December 2019	17:50	Men's 3000 m relay	Final

== Medal summary ==
=== Medal table ===
* Host nation (Philippines)

Rank	Nation	Gold	Silver	Bronze	Total
1	Singapore (SGP)	3	0	1	4
2	Thailand (THA)	2	1	1	4
3	Malaysia (MAS)	1	1	2	4
4	Indonesia (INA)	0	4	1	5
5	Philippines (PHI)*	0	0	1	1
Totals (5 entries)		6	6	6	18

=== Medalists ===
Event	Gold	Silver	Bronze
Men's 500 m	Natthapat Kancharin; Thailand	Steavanus Wihardja; Indonesia	Triphop Thongngam; Thailand
Men's 1000 m	Natthapat Kancharin; Thailand	Steavanus Wihardja; Indonesia	Marc Joseph Gonzales; Philippines
Men's 3000 m relay	Singapore; Zen Koh; Lucas Ng; Trevor Tan; Xu Jingfeng	Thailand; Prakit Borvornmongkolsak; Natthapat Kancharin; Kan Soponkij; Triphop Thongngam	Indonesia; Aulia Gaffar; Ivano Utomo; Jeremia Wihardja; Steavanus Wihardja
Women's 500 m	Cheyenne Goh; Singapore	Dione Tan; Malaysia	Anja Chong; Malaysia
Women's 1000 m	Cheyenne Goh; Singapore	Ratu Afifah Nur Indah; Indonesia	Dione Tan; Malaysia
Women's 3000 m relay	Malaysia; Kynie Chan; Ashley Chin; Anja Chong; Dione Tan	Indonesia; Ratu Afifah Nur Indah; Dhinda Salsabila; Rahmah Osya Samudra; Gita Widya Yunika	Singapore; Victoria Chin; Suvian Chua; Cheyenne Goh; Soo Kar Weng
