= Polo at the 2017 SEA Games =

- Venue: The Royal Selangor Polo Club; Putrajaya Equestrian Park
- Date: 22 August 2017
- Competitors: 28 from 4 nations

The polo competitions at the 2017 Southeast Asian Games in Kuala Lumpur took place at Putrajaya Equestrian Park and the Royal Selangor Polo Club. Polo returns to the competition schedule after edition of the games in 1983 and 2007.

== Competition schedule ==
- Official Draw For Polo (image)
- 29th SEA Games Polo Schedule

== Participating nations ==
- Brunei (7)
- Malaysia (7)
- Singapore (7)
- Thailand (7)

== Medal summary ==
=== Medal table ===
Host nation

Rank	Nation	Gold	Silver	Bronze	Total
1	Malaysia*	1	0	0	1
2	Thailand	0	1	0	1
3	Brunei	0	0	1	1
Totals (3 entries)		1	1	1	3

=== Medalists ===
Event	Gold	Silver	Bronze
Team	Malaysia (MAS); Abdul Rashid Hasnan; Amran Selamat; Khairy Jamaluddin; Mohd Zulhelmi Nadzar; Muhammad Faizal Abu Bakar; Shaik Reismann Ismail; Tengku Ahmad Shazril Ezzani Suleiman	Thailand (THA); Aiyawatt Srivaddhanaprabha; Apichet Srivaddhanaprabha; Nattapong Pratumlee; Nutthadith Sila-amornsak; Ploy Bhinsaeng; Satid Wongkraso; Thanasin Chuawangkham	Brunei (BRU); Huzaimi Haji Mahari; Mohamad Huzaimi Husin; Muhamad Farid Abdullah; Prince Abdul Qawi; Prince Bahar Jefri Bolkiah; Prince Abdul Mateen; Princess Azemah Ni'matul Bolkiah

== See also ==
- Equestrian at the 2017 Southeast Asian Games
