= Brunei at the 2017 SEA Games =

Brunei at the 2017 Southeast Asian Games
- IOC code: BRU
- NOC: Brunei Darussalam National Olympic Council
- Website: www.bruneiolympic.org (in English)

in Kuala Lumpur 19–30 August 2017
- Competitors: 105 in 14 sports
- Flag bearer: Mohammad Adi Salihin
- Officials: 67
- Medals Ranked 10th: Gold 0 Silver 5 Bronze 9 Total 14

Southeast Asian Games appearances (overview)
- 1977; 1979; 1981; 1983; 1985; 1987; 1989; 1991; 1993; 1995; 1997; 1999; 2001; 2003; 2005; 2007; 2009; 2011; 2013; 2015; 2017; 2019; 2021; 2023; 2025; 2027; 2029

Brunei competed in the 2017 Southeast Asian Games in Malaysia from 19 to 30 August 2017.

== Competitors ==
Sport	Men	Women	Total
Aquatic Synchronized	0	2	2
Athletics	5	0	5
Badminton	1	0	1
Cycling	7	0	7
Equestrian	8	1	9
Fencing	2	1	3
Football	20	0	20
Golf	4	0	4
Karate	3	4	7
Lawn Bowls	10	6	16
Netball	0	12	12
Pencak silat	1	1	2
Sepak Takraw	12	0	12
Wushu	3	2	5
Total	76	29	105

== Medal summary ==
=== Medal by sport ===
Medals by sport
Sport	1st place, gold medalist(s)	2nd place, silver medalist(s)	3rd place, bronze medalist(s)	Total
Lawn bowls	0	3	1	4
Netball	0	0	1	1
Polo	0	0	1	1
Pencak silat	0	1	0	1
Sepak takraw	0	0	4	4
Karate	0	0	1	1
Wushu	0	1	1	2
Total	0	5	9	14

=== Medal by date ===
Medals by date
Day	Date	1st place, gold medalist(s)	2nd place, silver medalist(s)	3rd place, bronze medalist(s)	Total
–3	16 August	0	0	1	1
–2	17 August	0	0	1	1
–1	18 August	0	0	0	0
0	19 August	0	0	1	1
1	20 August	0	0	1	1
2	21 August	0	0	0	0
3	22 August	0	1	1	2
4	23 August	0	0	0	0
5	24 August	0	0	1	1
6	25 August	0	1	1	2
7	26 August	0	1	0	1
8	27 August	0	1	0	1
9	28 August	0	0	0	0
10	29 August	0	1	2	3
11	30 August				
Total		0	5	9	14

== Medalists ==
Medal	Name	Sport	Event
Silver	Ampuan Ahad Ampuan Kasim; Haji Naim Brahim; Pg Haji Tengah Pg Haji Tejudin	Lawn bowls	Men's triples
Silver	Amalia Matali	Lawn bowls	Women's singles
Silver	Dk Nurul Nabilah; Esmawandy Brahim	Lawn bowls	Women's pairs
Silver	Norleyermah Haji Raya	Pencak silat	Women's singles seni (artistic)
Silver	Basma Lachkar	Wushu	Women's taijiquan
Bronze	Amirah Syahidah Abd Rahim; Aufa Bazilah Abdul Razak; Wahidah Kamarul Zaman	Karate	Women's team
Bronze	Ajijah Muntol; Norafizah Matossen; Suhana Md Daud	Lawn bowls	Women's triples
Bronze	Nurulain Abdul Hamid; Siti Marhayati Ahmad; Siti Nurul Nazihah; Athiyyah As'ad; Dayangku Khalisha; Nurafiqah Samat; Nur Syuhaidah Fahriyana; Dayangku Nur Amal; Nur Ady Elzza; Zuraidah; Dayangku Noor Nadziratul; Nur Hafizah	Netball	Women's team
Bronze	YTM PS DPM Abdul Mateen; YTM PS PAP Azemah Ni'matul Bolkiah; Huzaimi Haji Mahari; Mohamad Huzaimi Husin; Muhamad Farid Abdullah; Pengiran Muda Abdul Qawi; Pengiran Muda Bahar	Polo	Team
Bronze	Mohammad Hafizzuddin Jamaludin; Mohammad Selamat Yakup; Mohammad Shahrine Bubin; Mohd Alliffuddin Jamaludin; Muhamad Basyiruddin Haji Kamis	Sepak takraw	Men's regu
Bronze	Abdul Hadi Saidin; Abdul Mu'iz Nordin; Humaidi Brahim; Ismail Ang; Jamaludin Awang Haji Marzi; Mohammad Hafizzuddin Jamaludin; Mohammad Selamat Yakup; Mohammad Shahrine Bubin; Mohd Alliffuddin Jamaludin; Muhamad Basyiruddin Haji Kamis; Muhammad Azri Awang Abdul Harith; Nur Alimin Sungoh	Sepak takraw	Men's team regu
Bronze	Abdul Hadi Saidin; Abdul Mu'iz Nordin; Humaidi Brahim; Ismail Ang; Jamaludin Awang Haji Marzi; Mohammad Hafizzuddin Jamaludin; Muhamad Basyiruddin Haji Kamis; Muhammad Azri Awang Abdul Harith	Sepak takraw	Non-repetition primary
Bronze	Abdul Hadi Saidin; Abdul Mu'iz Nordin; Humaidi Brahim; Ismail Ang; Jamaludin Awang Haji Marzi; Mohammad Hafizzuddin Jamaludin; Muhamad Basyiruddin Haji Kamis; Muhammad Azri Awang Abdul Harith	Sepak takraw	Linking
Bronze	Md Sufi Shayiran bin Roslan	Wushu	Men's nanquan
