= Short-track speed skating at the 2017 SEA Games =

Short track speed skating at the 2017 SEA Games
- Short track speed skating pictogram
- Venue: Empire City Mall
- Location: Kuala Lumpur, Malaysia
- Date: 29–30 August 2017
- Nations: 11 (see below)

The short track speed skating competitions at the 2017 Southeast Asian Games in Kuala Lumpur will take place at Empire City Ice Arena in Damansara, Kuala Lumpur.

The 2017 Games feature competitions in six events (3 events for each gender). It served as a qualifying event for the 2018 Winter Olympics

== Participation ==
=== Participating nations ===
- Indonesia
- Malaysia
- Philippines
- Singapore
- Thailand
- Vietnam (1)*
- Athlete did not compete

== Medal summary ==
=== Medal table ===
Host nation

Rank	Nation	Gold	Silver	Bronze	Total
1	Malaysia (MAS)*	4	0	3	7
2	Thailand (THA)	2	1	0	3
3	Singapore (SGP)	0	4	1	5
4	Indonesia (INA)	0	1	1	2
Totals (4 entries)		6	6	5	17

=== Men's events ===
Event	Gold	Silver	Bronze
500 m	Triphop Thongngam; Thailand	Steavanus Wihardja; Indonesia	Ariff Rasydan Fadzli; Malaysia
1000 m	Triphop Thongngam; Thailand	Lucas Ng Jun Jie; Singapore	Hazim Syahmi Shahrum; Malaysia
3000 m relay	Malaysia (MAS); Khairil Ridhwan Khalil; Ariff Rasydan Fadzli; Hazim Syahmi Shahrum; Ameer Iman Fadzli; Wong De-vin	Singapore (SGP); Chong Miki; Chua Qi En; Lim Chia Yeh; Lim Jun Hao; Lucas Ng Jun Jie	No bronze medal awarded

==== Women's events ====
Event	Gold	Silver	Bronze
500 m	Anja Chong; Malaysia	Vorravalan Leechinnaphat; Thailand	Cheyenne Goh; Singapore
1000 m	Anja Chong; Malaysia	Cheyenne Goh; Singapore	Ashley Chin Sook Hui; Malaysia
3000 m relay	Malaysia (MAS); Anja Chong; Ashley Chin Sook Hui; Nadja Chong Na Ya; Nor Marissa Alia Lokman; See Wan Ni	Singapore (SGP); Victoria Chin; Deanna Jacqueline See Zhen; Cheyenne Goh; Danielle Han Xinyun; Suvian Chua	Indonesia (INA); Alyssa Thirza Putri; Rafaela; Rahmah Osya Samudra; Ratu Afifah Nur Indah
