= Singapore at the 2018 Winter Olympics =

- Flag of Singapore
- IOC code: SGP
- NOC: Singapore National Olympic Council
- Website: singaporeolympics.com

in Pyeongchang, South Korea 9–25 February 2018
- Competitors: 1 in 1 sport
- Flag bearer: Cheyenne Goh (opening)
- Medals: Gold 0 Silver 0 Bronze 0 Total 0

Winter Olympics appearances (overview)
- 2018; 2022; 2026

Singapore sent a delegation to compete at the 2018 Winter Olympics in Pyeongchang, South Korea, from 9 to 25 February 2018. This marked the debut for Singapore at the Winter Olympics. The country was represented by single competitor, speed skater Cheyenne Goh. She did not advance out of the qualifying round of her event, the women's 1500 metres race.

== Background ==
Singapore, then a British colony, first joined Olympic competition at the 1948 Summer Olympics, and have participated in every Summer Olympic Games since, except 1964, where Singaporean athletes competed as part of the Malaysian team, and the boycotted 1980 Summer Olympics. This was Singapore's debut appearance at a Winter Olympic Games. The only athlete Singapore qualified was Cheyenne Goh, a short-track speed skater. A former Olympian in table tennis for Singapore in the 2004 Summer Olympics, Tan Paey Fern, was named as the chef de mission of the team. Goh was chosen as the flag bearer for the parade of nations during the opening ceremony, while a volunteer from the PyeongChang Organizing Committee for the 2018 Olympic & Paralympic Winter Games carried the Singaporean flag for the closing ceremony. On carrying the flag, Goh said "I'm really excited and it's a pretty big honour to be able to be doing this, I think it's really cool."

== Short track speed skating ==
On 23 November it was announced by the International Skating Union (ISU) that Singapore had received a qualifying place for the women's 1500 m speed skating competition. Goh, who was 18 years old at the time of the Pyeongchang Olympics, put her studies on hold to pursue competing in the Olympics. She was born in Singapore, but has lived in Canada since the age of four. The women's 1500 metres race took place on 17 February. Goh finished fifth in her heat with a time of 2 minutes and 36.9 seconds, and failed to advance to the semi-finals.

Athlete	Event	Heat		Semi-final		Final	
Athlete	Event	Time	Rank	Time	Rank	Time	Rank
Cheyenne Goh	Women's 1500 m	2:36.971	5	did not advance			

== See also ==
- Singapore at the 2017 Asian Winter Games
- Singapore at the 2018 Commonwealth Games
