= Rugby sevens at the 2017 SEA Games =

Rugby Sevens at the 2017 SEA Games
- Venue: Petaling Jaya Stadium
- Location: Petaling Jaya, Malaysia
- Dates: 19–20 August 2017
- Nations: 7

The rugby sevens competitions at the 2017 Southeast Asian Games in Kuala Lumpur took place at the Petaling Jaya Stadium in Petaling Jaya.

The 2017 edition featured competitions in two events.

== Competition schedule ==
| G | Group stage | PO | 5th place play-off | B | 3rd place play-off | F | Final |

| Event | Sat 19 | Sun 20 | | | |
|---|---|---|---|---|---|
| Men | G | G | PO | B | F |
| Women | G | G | PO | B | F |

== Participating nations ==
=== Men's tournament ===
- Cambodia
- Indonesia
- Malaysia
- Philippines
- Singapore
- Thailand

=== Women's tournament ===
- Laos
- Malaysia
- Philippines
- Singapore
- Thailand

== Men's competition ==
=== Group stage ===
| Pos | Team | Pld | W | D | L | PF | PA | PD | Pts | Final Result |
|---|---|---|---|---|---|---|---|---|---|---|
| 1 | Malaysia (H) | 5 | 4 | 0 | 1 | 169 | 36 | +133 | 13 | Advanced to Gold medal match |
| 2 | Singapore | 5 | 4 | 0 | 1 | 174 | 43 | +131 | 13 | Advanced to Gold medal match |
| 3 | Thailand | 5 | 4 | 0 | 1 | 159 | 47 | +112 | 13 | Advanced to Bronze medal match |
| 4 | Philippines | 5 | 2 | 0 | 3 | 129 | 90 | +39 | 9 | Advanced to Bronze medal match |
| 5 | Indonesia | 5 | 1 | 0 | 4 | 52 | 231 | −179 | 7 | Advanced to 5th place playoff match |
| 6 | Cambodia | 5 | 0 | 0 | 5 | 14 | 250 | −236 | 5 | Advanced to 5th place playoff match |

Source: Schedule
(H) Hosts

=== Final round ===
5th place playoff

20 August 2017
15:38

| Indonesia | 12–17 | Cambodia |

Bronze medal match

20 August 2017
16:00

| Thailand | 26–7 | Philippines |

Gold medal match

20 August 2017
17:06

| Malaysia | 22–7 | Singapore |

== Women's competition ==
=== Group stage ===
| Pos | Team | Pld | W | D | L | PF | PA | PD | Pts | Qualification |
|---|---|---|---|---|---|---|---|---|---|---|
| 1 | Thailand | 4 | 4 | 0 | 0 | 143 | 15 | +128 | 12 | Final round |
| 2 | Singapore | 4 | 3 | 0 | 1 | 81 | 29 | +52 | 10 | Final round |
| 3 | Malaysia (H) | 4 | 1 | 1 | 2 | 46 | 60 | −14 | 7 | Final round |
| 4 | Philippines | 4 | 1 | 1 | 2 | 36 | 62 | −26 | 7 | Final round |
| 5 | Laos | 4 | 0 | 0 | 4 | 5 | 145 | −140 | 4 | |

Updated to match(es) played on 20 August 2017. Source: Schedule
(H) Hosts

=== Final round ===
Semi-finals
20 August – 13:44
Thailand | 26
Philippines | 0
20 August – 14:06
Singapore | 22
Malaysia | 0

Gold medal match
20 August – 16:44
Thailand | 17
Singapore | 10
Bronze medal match
20 August – 16:22
Philippines | 5
Malaysia | 7

==== Semi-finals ====
20 August 2017
13:44

| Thailand | 26–0 | Philippines |

20 August 2017
14:06

| Singapore | 22–0 | Malaysia |

==== Bronze medal match ====
20 August 2017
16:22

| Philippines | 5–7 | Malaysia |

==== Gold medal match ====
20 August 2017
16:44

| Thailand | 17–10 | Singapore |

== Medal summary ==
=== Medal table ===
Host nation

| Rank | Nation | Gold | Silver | Bronze | Total |
|---|---|---|---|---|---|
| 1 | Malaysia (MAS)* | 1 | 0 | 1 | 2 |
| 1 | Thailand (THA) | 1 | 0 | 1 | 2 |
| 3 | Singapore (SGP) | 0 | 2 | 0 | 2 |
| Totals (3 entries) | | 2 | 2 | 2 | 6 |

=== Medalists ===
| Event | Gold | Silver | Bronze |
|---|---|---|---|
| Men's tournament | Malaysia (MAS); Mohamad Khairul Abdillah Ramli; Mohamad Nur Azri Azmi; Mohamad Safwan Abdullah; Muhamad Firdaus Tarmizi; Muhammad Ameer Nasrun Zulkeffli; Muhammad Siddiq Amir Jalil; Muhammad Zulhisham Rasli; Muhd Azwan Zuwairi Mat Zizi; Muhd Dzafran Asyraaf Zainudin; Nik Mohd Shahiddan Zain; Wan Izzuddin Ismail; Zulkiflee Azmi | Singapore (SGP); Adam Alexander Vine; Ho Yi Shu; Jonathan Hong Jia Wong; Marah Moehammad Ishraf; Mattias Chia Jun Ray; Muhammad Zaki Mahmood; Nashrul Hadi Hanafi; Nicholas Yau Yu Hong; Samuel Koh Giap Yang; Sidney Kumar; Teng Chong Yao; Xavier Laurent Ducourneau | Thailand (THA); Akarin Thitisakulvit; Apichai Phichaikamol; Chatree Wannadit; Khomchak Chakrabandhu Na Ayudhaya; Klin Laksanasompong; Panupong Puangpun; Pattarapat Ganjanaget; Pitpong Plybua; Sumet Thammaporn; Tyler James Chant; Warongkorn Khamkoet; Wuttikorn Kaewkhiao |
| Women's tournament | Thailand (THA); Butsaya Bunrak; Chitchanok Yusri; Jeeraporn Peerabunanon; Jutamas Butket; Naritsara Worakitsirikun; Piyamat Chomphumee; Rattanaporn Wittayaronnayut; Ruksina Navakaew; Thanachporn Wandee; Thanaporn Huankid; Tidarat Sawatnam; Uthumporn Liamrat | Singapore (SGP); Alvinia Ow Yong Yu Xiu; Chan Jia Yu; Eunice Chu Jia Hui; Huab Arra Heloise Castro; Jayne Chan Jing Yi; Lai Pui San; Lee Han Ni; Nur Shuhadah Mohd Abdul Gaffoor; Ong Pei Yi; Samantha Teo Ming Li; Sim Chiew Hong; Wong Yilin | Malaysia (MAS); Christina Edris; Cindy John Pasan; Dayang Anak Manggie; Euphrasia Anne Cralis; Fidelia Limang Anak Telajan; Henrietta David; Norfarahana Aziz; Normasyirah Zahari; Rozliana Mohd Ridwan; Sharifah Noor Fasha Edayu; Siti Farhanita Maddin; Wan Zufirah Mohd Nasir |
