= Synchronised swimming at the 2017 SEA Games =

- Venue: National Aquatic Centre
- Location: Kuala Lumpur, Malaysia
- Date: 17–20 August 2017

The synchronised swimming competitions at the 2017 Southeast Asian Games in Kuala Lumpur took place at National Aquatic Centre in Bukit Jalil. It was one of four aquatic sports at the Games, along with diving, swimming and water polo.

The 2017 Games featured competitions in five events.

== Events ==
The following events were contested:

- Duet Free Routine
- Duet Technical Routine
- Solo Free Routine
- Solo Technical Routine
- Team Free Routine

== Participation ==
=== Participating nations ===
- Brunei
- Cambodia
- Indonesia
- Laos
- Malaysia
- Myanmar
- Philippines
- Singapore
- Thailand
- Timor-Leste
- Vietnam

== Medal summary ==
=== Medal table ===
* Host nation (Malaysia)

Rank	Nation	Gold	Silver	Bronze	Total
1	Singapore	3	2	2	7
2	Malaysia*	2	3	0	5
3	Indonesia	0	0	3	3
Totals (3 entries)		5	5	5	15

=== Medalists ===
Event	Gold		Silver		Bronze	
Solo Technical Routine	Gan Hua Wei; Malaysia	73.8386	Debbie Soh Li Fei; Singapore	73.8253	Miya Yong Hsing; Singapore	72.3769
Solo Free Routine	Debbie Soh Li Fei; Singapore	75.0000	Zylane Lee Yhing Huey; Malaysia	74.7000	Miya Yong Hsing; Singapore	73.0333
Duet Technical Routine	Singapore; Miya Yong Hsing; Debbie Soh Li Fei	75.1791	Malaysia; Gan Hua Wei; Zylane Lee Yhing Huey	74.3659	Indonesia; Anisa Feritrianti; Claudia Megawati Suyanto	68.9504
Duet Free Routine	Malaysia; Gan Hua Wei; Zylane Lee Yhing Huey	76.3000	Singapore; Miya Yong Hsing; Debbie Soh Li Fei	76.2333	Indonesia; Anisa Feritrianti; Claudia Megawati Suyanto	71.4667
Team Free Routine	Singapore; Gwyneth Goh Xiao Hui; Hannah Chiang Yi Min; Miya Yong Hsing; Christine Mok Tze Yin; Shae-Lynn Yan Siying; Ariel Sng Kai Lin; Debbie Soh Li Fei; Rachel Thean Rae Sze; Vivien Tai Wen Ting	75.1333	Malaysia; Chai Jia Yue; Foong Yan Nie; Gan Zhen Yu; Veronica Lee Yiat Lum; Lee Yiat Xin; Leong Jie Wen; Mandy Lim Jia Jia; Nur Liyana Nadirah; Ong Ee Theng; Wong Mei Teng	73.0667	Indonesia; Amara Cinthia Gebby; Anisa Feritrianti; Claudia Megawati Suyanto; Iin Rahmadhania; Maharani Sekar Langit; Naima Syeeda Sharita; Nurfa Nurul Utama; Petra Septaria Puspa Melati; Pratiwi Adhiati Kusumawardani; Visky Sekar Floreta Pribadi	71.4667
