= Malaysia at the 2017 SEA Games =

Malaysia at the 2017 Southeast Asian Games
- IOC code: MAS
- NOC: Olympic Council of Malaysia
- Website: www.olympic.org.my (in English)

in Malaysia
- Competitors: 844 in 38 sports
- Flag bearers: Azizul Hasni Awang; Cheong Jun Hoong; Mohd Al-Jufferi Jamari
- Officials: 390
- Medals Ranked 1st: Gold 145 Silver 91 Bronze 86 Total 322

Southeast Asian Games appearances (overview)
- 1959; 1961; 1965; 1967; 1969; 1971; 1973; 1975; 1977; 1979; 1981; 1983; 1985; 1987; 1989; 1991; 1993; 1995; 1997; 1999; 2001; 2003; 2005; 2007; 2009; 2011; 2013; 2015; 2017; 2019; 2021; 2023; 2025; 2027; 2029

Malaysia participated in the 2017 Southeast Asian Games from 14 to 30 August 2017 as the host nation of the 29th edition of the Games. The Malaysian contingent was represented by 844 athletes consisting of 469 men and 375 women.

The Malaysian contingent became overall Southeast Asian Games champion for only the second time ever in the history of the games amassing a total of 145 gold medals more than the targeted figure of 111 gold medals.

== Medal summary ==
=== Medal by sport ===
Medals by sport
Sport	1st place, gold medalist(s)	2nd place, silver medalist(s)	3rd place, bronze medalist(s)	Total	Rank
Archery	5	3	2	10	(1)
Athletics	8	8	9	25	3
Badminton	1	5	2	8	3
Basketball	1	0	0	1	(1)
Billiards and snooker	0	0	3	3	7
Bowling	7	4	3	14	(1)
Boxing	1	1	1	3	3
Cricket	1	1	1	3	(1)
Cycling	13	10	3	26	(1)
Diving	12	5	1	19	(1)
Equestrian	6	2	1	9	(1)
Fencing	0	0	1	1	5
Field hockey	2	0	0	2	(1)
Figure skating	1	0	1	2	2
Football	0	1	0	1	2
Futsal	0	1	0	1	3
Golf	0	0	1	1	4
Gymnastics	13	9	2	24	(1)
Ice hockey	0	0	1	1	3
Indoor hockey	1	0	1	2	(1)
Judo	0	1	3	4	5
Karate	7	2	4	13	(1)
Lawn bowls	7	1	0	8	(1)
Muaythai	2	1	1	4	2
Netball	1	0	0	1	(1)
Pencak silat	10	2	4	16	(1)
Pétanque	2	1	3	6	2
Polo	1	0	0	1	(1)
Rugby sevens	1	0	1	2	(1)
Sailing	6	4	4	14	(1)
Sepak takraw	2	3	6	11	3
Short track speed skating	4	0	3	7	(1)
Shooting	4	5	3	12	2
Squash	6	4	2	12	(1)
Swimming	5	3	3	11	3
Synchronised swimming	2	3	0	5	2
Table tennis	0	0	2	2	5
Taekwondo	3	4	5	12	2
Tennis	0	0	1	1	5
Triathlon	0	0	1	1	2
Waterskiing	4	1	2	7	(1)
Water polo	0	0	1	1	4
Weightlifting	0	1	1	2	4
Wushu	6	5	3	14	(1)
Total	145	91	86	322	(1)

=== Medal by date ===
Medals by date
Day	Date	1st place, gold medalist(s)	2nd place, silver medalist(s)	3rd place, bronze medalist(s)	Total
–3	16 August	1	1	2	4
–2	17 August	3	2	1	6
–1	18 August	3	1	0	4
0	19 August	0	0	2	2
1	20 August	9	9	4	22
2	21 August	8	6	5	19
3	22 August	16	12	8	36
4	23 August	10	6	10	26
5	24 August	13	8	7	28
6	25 August	5	1	6	12
7	26 August	14	12	9	35
8	27 August	13	6	9	28
9	28 August	16	12	6	34
10	29 August	29	13	15	57
11	30 August	5	1	2	8
Total		144	91	86	323

== Medalists ==
Medal	Name	Sport	Event	Date
Gold	Muhammad Faiz bin Roslan; Mohammad Kamal Aizzat bin Azmi; Ab Muhaimi bin Che Bongsu; Putera Aidil Israfil bin Kamaruzaman; Muhamad Asyraaf bin Abdul Hadi; Izuan Affendi bin Azlan; Mohd Nazuha bin Mohd Nazli; Iskandar Zulkarnain bin Salim	Sepak takraw	Chinlone – linking	16 August
Gold	Lee Kin Lip; Mohd Juwaidi Mazuki; Zulfadli Ruslan	Archery	Men's team compound	17 August
Gold	Fatin Nurfatehah Mat Salleh; Saritha Cham Nong; Nurul Syazhera	Archery	Women's team compound	17 August
Gold	Gan Hua Wei	Synchronised swimming	Solo technical routine	17 August
Gold	Kevin Yeap	Swimming	Men's 10km open water	18 August
Gold	Heidi Gan	Swimming	Women's 10km open water	18 August
Gold	Mohd Juwaidi Mazuki; Fatin Nurfatehah Mat Salleh	Archery	Mixed team compound	18 August
Gold	Yeap Wai Kin	Wushu	Men's optional jianshu	20 August
Gold	Sultan Mizan Zainal Abidin	Equestrian	Individual endurance	20 August
Gold	Sultan Mizan Zainal Abidin; Azizatul Asma Abdullah; Mohamad Adhwa Embong; Mohammad Fuad Hashim; Mohd Bulkhari Rozali; Mohd Yusran Yusuf	Equestrian	Team endurance	20 August
Gold	Gan Hua Wei; Lee Yhing Huey	Synchronised swimming	Duet free routine	20 August
Gold	Loh Jack Chang	Wushu	Men's optional taijijian	20 August
Gold	Karishma S. Loganathan; Norashikin Kamal Zaman; Pow Mei Foong; Yap Suo Kuen; Shandralelka Shanmugam; An Najwa Azizan; Siti Nor Farhana Mustafa; Izyan Syazana Mohd Wazir; Nur Fariha Abdul Razak; Nur Syafazliyana Mohd Ali; Noramirah Dayana Noor Azhar; Puah Pei San	Netball	Women's team	20 August
Gold	Diana Bong Siong Lin	Wushu	Women's optional nanquan	20 August
Gold	Wan Izzuddin; Safwan Abdullah; Zulhisham Rasli; Siddiq Jalil; Ameer Nasrun; Khairul Abdillah; Zulkiflee Azmi; Nik Mohd Shaiddan; Nur Azri Azmi; Azwan Zuwairi; Dzafran Asyraaf; Firdaus Tarmizi	Rugby sevens	Men's team	20 August
Gold	Rafiq Ismail	Bowling	Men's singles	20 August
Gold	Yeap Wai Kin	Wushu	Men's optional qiangshu	21 August
Gold	Khairul Anuar; Akmal Hasrin; Haziq Kamaruddin	Archery	Men's team recurve	21 August
Gold	Nur Afisa Abdul Halil; Nur Aliya Ghapar; Nuramalia Haneesha Mazlan	Archery	Women's team recurve	21 August
Gold	Harrif Saleh	Cycling	Road men's criterium	21 August
Gold	Syafiq Ridhwan; Alex Liew	Bowling	Men's doubles	21 August
Gold	Benjamin Khor	Shooting	Men's double trap individual	21 August
Gold	Welson Sim	Swimming	Men's 400m freestyle	21 August
Gold	Farah Ann Abdul Hadi; Lavinia Raymund-Jayadev; Nur Azira Aziri; Nur Eli Ellina Azmi; Tan Ing Yueh; Tracie Ang	Gymnastics	Artistic women's team	21 August
Gold	Ho Mun Hua	Wushu	Men's optional nanquan	22 August
Gold	Loh Jack Chang	Wushu	Men's compulsory 3rd taijiquan	22 August
Gold	Muhammad Ameen A. Kamal; Muhammad Ameer A. Kamal; Muhammad Fauzan A. Lutfi; Nik Mohd Azwan bin Zulkifle	Cycling	Road men's team time trial	22 August
Gold	Edric Lee Chin Hon; Mohd Qabil Ambak Mahamad Fathil; Quek Sue Yian; Quzandria Nur Mahamad Fathil	Equestrian	Team dressage	22 August
Gold	Tan Fu Jie	Gymnastics	Artistic men's pommel horse	22 August
Gold	Jeremiah Loo	Gymnastics	Artistic men's pommel horse	22 August
Gold	Tan Ing Yueh	Gymnastics	Artistic women's vault	22 August
Gold	Alia Sazana	Shooting	Women's 25m pistol	22 August
Gold	Irfan Shamsuddin	Athletics	Men's discus throw	22 August
Gold	Hafizuddin Mat Daud	Pétanque	Men's singles	22 August
Gold	Lim Chee Wei	Karate	Men's kata individual	22 August
Gold	Celine Lee	Karate	Women's kata individual	22 August
Gold	Senthil Kumaran	Karate	Men's kumite below 60kg	22 August
Gold	Israr Hazim Ismail; Muhammad Fauzi Kaman Shah; Muhammad Syafie Ali; Nor Nabila Natasha Mohd Nazri; Nurul Shazwanie Mohd Saad	Sailing	Mixed team optimist	22 August
Gold	Rafiq Ismail; Sin Li Jane	Bowling	Mixed doubles	22 August
Gold	Khairul Hafiz Jantan	Athletics	Men's 100m	22 August
Gold	Farah Ann Abdul Hadi	Gymnastics	Women's floor exercise	23 August
Gold	Jackie Wong	Athletics	Men's hammer throw	23 August
Gold	Shalin Zulkifli; Esther Cheah; Sin Li Jane	Bowling	Women's trios	23 August
Gold	Syakila Salni	Karate	Women's kumite below 55kg	23 August
Gold	R Sharmendran	Karate	Men's kumite below 75kg	23 August
Gold	Elena Goh Ling Yin	Athletics	Women's 10000m walk	23 August
Gold	Welson Sim	Swimming	Men's 200m freestyle	23 August
Gold	Rachel Arnold; Andrea Lee	Squash	Women's doubles	23 August
Gold	Ng Eain Yow; Mohd Shafik	Squash	Men's doubles	23 August
Gold	Hakimi Ismail	Athletics	Men's triple jump	23 August
Gold	Sanjay Singh Chal; Sivasangari Subramaniam	Squash	Mixed doubles	24 August
Gold	Emmanuel Leong Theng Kuang; Hoe Thomson; Lim Chee Wei	Karate	Men's team kata	24 August
Gold	Mohd Taqiyuddin Hamid; Rosli Sharif	Pencak silat	Men's seni (artistic) ganda	24 August
Gold	Quzandria Nur Mahamad Fathil	Equestrian	Individual dressage	24 August
Gold	Muhd Ezuan Nasir Khan	Shooting	Men's 50m rifle prone	24 August
Gold	Muhamad Fuad M. Redzuan	Boxing	Men's light flyweight	24 August
Gold	Grace Wong	Athletics	Women's hammer throw	24 August
Gold	Saiful Bahri; Syed Akmal Fikri	Pétanque	Men's doubles	24 August
Gold	Nur Fidrah Noh; Nor Hashimah Ismail; Nurul Alyani Jamil; Nur Ain Nabilah Tarmizi	Lawn bowls	Women's fours	24 August
Gold	Bowlers:	Bowling	Women's team	24 August
Gold	Madhuri Poovanesan; Mathivani Murugeesan; Shree Sharmini Segaran; Syakilla Salni	Karate	Women's team kumite	24 August
Gold	Phee Jinq En	Swimming	Women's 100m breaststroke	24 August
Gold	Abdul Rashid Ahad; Ahmad Faiz Noor; Derek Michael Duraisingam; Dhivendran Mogan; Mohamad Fikri Makram Rosdi; Mohamad Norwira Zazmie Halim; Mohd Anwar Arudin; Mohd Shafiq Sharif; Mohd Shukri Abdul Rahim; Mohd Suharril Fetri Shuib; Muhamad Syahadat Ramli; Muhammad Anwar A Rahman; Muhammad Wafiq Irfan Zarbani; Pavandeep Singh; Virandeep Singh	Cricket	Men's team 50 over	24 August
Gold	Mohamad Fairus Abd Jabal; Syamil Syazwan; Mohd Amir Yusof	Lawn bowls	Men's triples	25 August
Gold	Nur Syazreen; Nor Hamizah	Pencak silat	Women's seni (artistic) ganda	25 August
Gold	Players:	Lawn bowls	Women's triples	25 August
Gold	Shalin Zulkifli	Bowling	Women's masters	25 August
Gold	Rafiq Ismail	Bowling	Men's masters	25 August
Gold	Fairul Izwan Abd Muin; Muhammad Hizlee Abdul Rais	Lawn bowls	Men's pairs	26 August
Gold (DQ)	Wendy Ng Yan Yee	Diving	Women's 3m springboard	26 August
Gold	Nur Dhabitah Sabri	Diving	Women's 3m springboard	26 August
Gold	Johnathan Wong	Shooting	Men's 10m air pistol	26 August
Gold	Equines:	Equestrian	Team show jumping	26 August
Gold	Ooi Tze Liang	Diving	Men's 3m springboard	26 August
Gold	Aaliyah Yoong	Waterskiing	Women's overall	26 August
Gold	Gabriel Gilbert; Pandelela Rinong	Diving	Mixed 3m & 10m team	26 August
Gold	Yap Khim Wen	Taekwondo	Women's poomsae individual	26 August
Gold	Chew Wei Yan	Taekwondo	Men's poomsae individual	26 August
Gold	Rayzam Shah	Athletics	Men's 110m hurdle	26 August
Gold	Gymnasts:	Gymnastics	Rhythmic women's all-around	26 August
Gold	Nauraj Singh Randhawa	Athletics	Men's high jump	26 August
Gold	Auni Fathiah Kamis; Siti Zalina Ahmad	Lawn bowls	Women's pairs	26 August
Gold	Khairul Afendy Kamaruzaman; Muhammad Najib Abu Hassan; Mohamad Ashran Hamsani; Muhammad Aslam Hanafiah; Shazril Irwan Nazli; Hanip Che Halim; Syed Mohamad Syafiq Cholan; Norsyafiq Sumantri; Muhd Amirol Aideed Arshad; Mohd Syafiq Yaacob; Muhd Najmi Farizal Jazlan; Mohamad Hazrul Faiz Sobri	Indoor hockey	Men's team	26 August
Gold	Players:	Basketball	Women's team	26 August
Gold	Soufi Rusli	Lawn bowls	Men's singles	27 August
Gold	Koi Sie Yan	Gymnastics	Rhythmic women's individual all-around	27 August
Gold	Gymnasts:	Gymnastics	Rhythmic women's single apparatus	27 August
Gold	Sailors:	Sailing	Men's international 470	27 August
Gold	Sailors:	Sailing	Men's international 420 (U19)	27 August
Gold	Emma Firyana	Lawn bowls	Women's singles	27 August
Gold	Julian Yee	Figure skating	Men's singles	27 August
Gold	Rozaimi Rozali	Taekwondo	Men's kyorugi featherweight 68kg	27 August
Gold	Cheong Jun Hoong	Diving	Women's 1m springboard	27 August
Gold	Ooi Tze Liang	Diving	Men's 10m platform	27 August
Gold	Irwandie Lakasek	Cycling	Track men's scratch	27 August
Gold	Cyclists:	Cycling	Track men's team sprint	27 August
Gold	Cyclists:	Cycling	Track women's team sprint	27 August
Gold	Koi Sie Yan	Gymnastics	Rhythmic women's individual hoop	28 August
Gold	Izzah Amzan	Gymnastics	Rhythmic women's individual ball	28 August
Gold	Koi Sie Yan	Gymnastics	Rhythmic women's individual clubs	28 August
Gold	Amy Kwan Dict Weng	Gymnastics	Rhythmic women's individual ribbon	28 August
Gold	Gymnasts:	Gymnastics	Rhythmic women's mixed apparatus	28 August
Gold	Pandelela Rinong	Diving	Women's 10m platform	28 August
Gold	Muhammad Afifi Nordin	Pencak silat	Men's seni (artistic) tunggal	28 August
Gold	Ahmad Amsyar Azman	Diving	Men's 1m springboard	28 August
Gold	Players:	Field hockey	Women's team	28 August
Gold	Sivasangari Subramaniam	Squash	Women's single	28 August
Gold	Muhammad Syafiq Puteh; Jasmine Lai	Diving	Mixed 3m springboard	28 August
Gold	Ng Eain Yow	Squash	Men's single	28 August
Gold	Eiman Firdaus Mohd Zamri	Cycling	Track men's pursuit	28 August
Gold	Fatehah Mustapa	Cycling	Track Women's sprint	28 August
Gold	Azizulhasni Awang	Cycling	Track men's sprint	28 August
Gold	Aaliyah Yoong	Waterskiing	Women's jumping	29 August
Gold	Faizul Nasir	Pencak silat	Men's tanding (match) class B 50-55kg	29 August
Gold	Siti Shazwana	Pencak silat	Women's tanding (match) class D 60-65kg	29 August
Gold	Razak Ghazali	Pencak silat	Men's tanding (match) class D 60-65kg	29 August
Gold	Al Jufferi Jamari	Pencak silat	Men's tanding (match) class E 65-70kg	29 August
Gold	Goh Jin Wei	Badminton	Women's singles	29 August
Gold	Aaliyah Yoong	Waterskiing	Women's trick	29 August
Gold	Adam Yoong	Waterskiing	Men's trick	29 August
Gold	Muhammad Fadhil	Cycling	Men's time trial (1 kilometres)	29 August
Gold	Fatehah Mustapa	Cycling	Women's time trial (500 metres)	29 August
Gold	Anja Chong	Short track speed skating	Women's 500m	29 August
Gold	Siti Rahmah	Pencak silat	Women's tanding (match) class E 65-70kg	29 August
Gold	Fauzi Khalid	Pencak silat	Men's tanding (match) class F 70-75kg	29 August
Gold	Robial Sobri	Pencak silat	Men's tanding (match) class H 80-85kg	29 August
Gold	Ahmad Latif Khan	Sailing	Men's Laser Radial	29 August
Gold	Nurul Shazwanie Saad	Sailing	Women's optimist (U16)	29 August
Gold	Muhammad Fauzi Kaman Shah	Sailing	Men's optimist (U16)	29 August
Gold	Players:	Polo	Team	29 August
Gold (DQ)	Ng Yan Yee; Nur Dhabitah Sabri	Diving	Women's synchronised 3m springboard	29 August
Gold	Mohd Ali Yaakub	Muaythai	Men's 54kg	29 August
Gold	Ain Kamarrudin	Muaythai	Men's 57kg	29 August
Gold	Ahmad Amsyar Azman; Chew Yiwei	Diving	Men's synchronised 3m springboard	29 August
Gold	Jellson Jabilin; Leong Mun Yee	Diving	Mixed synchronised 10m platform	29 August
Gold	Players:	Field hockey	Men's team	29 August
Gold	Cyclers:	Cycling	Men's team pursuit	29 August
Gold	Players:	Squash	Women's team	29 August
Gold	Fatehah Mustapa	Cycling	Women's keirin	29 August
Gold	Azizulhasni Awang	Cycling	Men's keirin	29 August
Gold	Players:	Sepak takraw	Men's regu	29 August
Gold	Leong Mun Yee; Traisy Vivien Tukiet	Diving	Women's synchronised 10m platform	30 August
Gold	Hanis Nazirul; Jellson Jabilin	Diving	Men's synchronised 10m platform	30 August
Gold	Ice-skaters:	Short track speed skating	Women's 3000m relay	30 August
Gold	Ice-skaters:	Short track speed skating	Men's 3000m relay	30 August
Gold	Anja Chong	Short track speed skating	Women's 1000m	30 August
Gold	Sharmini Christina	Equestrian	Individual show jumping	28 August
Silver	Mohd Juwaidi Mazuki	Archery	Men's compound	16 August
Silver	Lee Yhing Huey	Synchronised swimming	Solo free routine	17 August
Silver	Ab Muhaimi bin Che Bongsu; Izuan Affendi bin Azlan; Mohammad Kamal Aizzat bin Azmi; Mohd Zarlizan bin Zakaria; Muhammad Faiz bin Roslan; Muhammad Idham bin Sulaiman; Nur Hidayat Ar Rasyid bin Ahmad Daud; Putera Aidil Israfil bin Kamaruzaman	Sepak takraw	Chinlone – non-repetition primary	17 August
Silver	Gan Hua Wei; Lee Yhing Huey	Synchronised swimming	Duet technical routine	18 August
Silver	Mohd Bulkhari Rozali	Equestrian	Individual endurance	20 August
Silver	Wong Weng Son	Wushu	Men's optional jianshu	20 August
Silver	Phoon Eyin	Wushu	Women's optional jianshu	20 August
Silver	Loh Ying Ting	Wushu	Women's optional gunshu	20 August
Silver	Sin Li Jane	Bowling	Women's singles	20 August
Silver	Khairul Anuar Mohamad	Archery	Men's recurve	20 August
Silver	Adrian Ang	Bowling	Men's singles	20 August
Silver	Ong Ee Theng; Chai Jia Yue; Gan Zhen Yu; Foong Yan-Nie; Veronica Lee; Lee Yiat Xin; Wong Mei Teng; Mandy Lim Jia Jia; Nur Liyana Nadirah; Leong Jie Wen	Synchronised swimming	Team free routine	20 August
Silver	Azroy Amierol Jaafar; Chau Jern Rong; Jeremiah Loo Phay Xing; Muhd Abdul Azim Othman; Tan Fu Jie; Zul Bahrin Mat Asri	Gymnastics	Artistic men's team	20 August
Silver	Wong Weng Son	Wushu	Men's optional qiangshu	21 August
Silver	Phoon Eyin	Wushu	Women's optional qiangshu	21 August
Silver	Nor Farhana Ismail; Nurrashidah Abdul Rashid; Nurul Izzatul Hikmah Md Zulkifli; Siti Nor Suhaida Jafri; Siti Norzubaidah Che Ab Wahab	Sepak takraw	Women's regu	21 August
Silver	Jupha Somnet	Cycling	Women's criterium	21 August
Silver	Adrian Ang; Rafiq Ismail	Bowling	Men's doubles	21 August
Silver	Abraham Eng Wei Jin	Shooting	Men's double trap individual	21 August
Silver	Khairul Anuar Mohamad; Nur Aliya Ghapar	Archery	Mixed team recurve	22 August
Silver	Zul Bahrin Mat Asri	Gymnastics	Artistic men's floor exercise	22 August
Silver	Tracie Ang	Gymnastics	Artistic women's uneven bars	22 August
Silver	Johnathan Wong	Shooting	Men's 50m pistol	22 August
Silver	Pressy Misty Philip	Karate	Women's kumite Above 68kg	22 August
Silver	Alex Liew; Shalin Zulkifli	Bowling	Mixed doubles	22 August
Silver	Asri Azman; Khairulnizam Mohd Afendy; Muhammad Farhan Hamid	Sailing	Men's team Laser standard	22 August
Silver	Lo Choon Sieng	Athletics	Men's 20000m walk	22 August
Silver	Phee Jinq En	Swimming	Women's 50m breaststroke	22 August
Silver	Faang Der Tia'a	Swimming	Men's 200m butterfly	22 August
Silver	Swimmers:	Swimming	Men's 4x100m freestyle relay	22 August
Silver	Zaidatul Husniah Zulkifli	Athletics	Women's 100m	22 August
Silver	Tan Ing Yueh	Gymnastics	Women's balance beam	23 August
Silver	Jupha Somnet	Cycling	Women's mass start	23 August
Silver	Joseph Lee Koon Kit	Shooting	Men's skeet	23 August
Silver	Hasli Izwan Amir Hasan	Shooting	Men's 25m rapid-fire pistols	23 August
Silver	Nazihah Hanis; Chan Yiwen	Squash	Women's doubles	23 August
Silver	Zaidatul Husniah Zulkifli	Athletics	Women's 200m	23 August
Silver	Ryan Neville Pasqual; Andrea Lee	Squash	Mixed doubles	24 August
Silver	Mohd Qabil Ambak Mahamad Fathil	Equestrian	Individual dressage	24 August
Silver	Daeng Dhadyry Dahasry; Izzat Shameer Dzulkeple; Safuan Said; Zulhilmie Redzuan	Lawn bowls	Men's fours	24 August
Silver	Mohd Shahrul Mat Amin	Cycling	Men's mass start	24 August
Silver	Chan Peng Soon; Goh Soon Huat; Goh Sze Fei; Nur Izzudin; Lee Zii Jia; Lim Chi Wing; Ong Yew Sin; Soong Joo Ven; Teo Ee Yi; Iskandar Zulkarnain Zainuddin	Badminton	Men's team	24 August
Silver	Sonia Cheah Su Ya; Cheah Yee See; Chow Mei Kuan; Goh Jin Wei; Ho Yen Mei; Vivian Hoo Kah Mun; Shevon Lai Jemie; Lee Meng Yean; Lee Ying Ying; Woon Khe Wei	Badminton	Women's team	24 August
Silver	Ariana Lim Jun Yi; Celine Lee Xin Yi; Cherlene Cheung Xue Lin	Karate	Women's team kata	24 August
Silver	Adli Hafidz Mohd Fauzi	Boxing	Men's Light Heavyweight	24 August
Silver	Chuah Yu Tian	Athletics	Women's pole vault	25 August
Silver	Athletes:	Pencak silat	Men's seni (Artistic) Regu	26 August
Silver	Ahmad Amsyar Azman	Diving	Men's 3m springboard	26 August
Silver	Bernard Yeoh	Shooting	Men's trap	26 August
Silver	Raja Nursheena	Athletics	Women's 100m hurdle	26 August
Silver	Yap Khim Wen; Yong Jin Kun	Taekwondo	Mixed poomsae team	26 August
Silver	Yong Jin Kun Kok Jun Ee Chew Wei Yan	Taekwondo	Men's poomsae team	26 August
Silver	Players:	Pétanque	Women's triples	26 August
Silver	Lee Hup Wei	Athletics	Men's high jump	26 August
Silver	Prabudass Krishnan	Athletics	Men's 5000m	26 August
Silver	Choo Kang Ni	Athletics	Women's discus throw	26 August
Silver	Chong Wei Fu	Judo	Men's 66kg	26 August
Silver	Amy Kwan Dict Weng	Gymnastics	Rhythmic women's individual all-around	27 August
Silver	Sailors:	Sailing	Women's international 470	27 August
Silver	Players:	Sepak takraw	Men's doubles	27 August
Silver	Jasmine Lai	Diving	Women's 1m springboard	27 August
Silver	Chew Yiwei	Diving	Men's 10m platform	27 August
Silver	Players:	Futsal	Men's team	27 August
Silver	Koi Sie Yan	Gymnastics	Rhythmic Women's Ball	28 August
Silver	Izzah Amzan	Gymnastics	Rhythmic Women's Clubs	28 August
Silver	Amy Kwan Dict Weng	Gymnastics	Rhythmic Women's Hoop	28 August
Silver	Koi Sie Yan	Gymnastics	Rhythmic Women's Ribbon	28 August
Silver	Geh Cheow Lin	Sailing	Women's windsurfing RS one	28 August
Silver	Ooi Tze Liang	Diving	Men'S 1m springboard	28 August
Silver	Rachel Mae Arnold	Squash	Women's singles	28 August
Silver	Mohammad Syafiq Kamal	Squash	Men's singles	28 August
Silver	Mohamad Nur Aiman	Cycling	Men's individual pursuit	28 August
Silver	Sofian Nabil Omar	Cycling	Men's omnium	28 August
Silver	Farina Shawati	Cycling	Women's sprint	28 August
Silver	Shah Firdaus Sharom	Cycling	Men's sprint	28 August
Silver	Aaliyah Yoong	Waterskiing	Women's slalom	29 August
Silver	Goh Soon Huat; Shevon Jamie Lai	Badminton	Mixed doubles	29 August
Silver	Soniia Cheah	Badminton	Women's singles	29 August
Silver	Shah Firdaus Sahrom	Cycling	Men's time trial (1 kilometres)	29 August
Silver	Khaizul Yaacob	Pencak silat	Men's tanding (match) class J 90-95kg	29 August
Silver	Nur Shazrin Latif	Sailing	Women's Laser Radial	29 August
Silver	Players:	Cricket	Men's Twenty20	29 August
Silver	Tengku Sharizal	Muaythai	Men's 63.5kg	29 August
Silver	Ong Yew Sin; Teo Ee Yi	Badminton	Men's doubles	29 August
Silver	Nur Dhia Liyana Shaharuddin	Taekwondo	Women's kyorugi flyweight 49kg	29 August
Silver	Iskandar Zulkanain Ahmad	Taekwondo	Men's kyorugi flyweight 58kg	29 August
Silver	Farina Shawati	Cycling	Women's keirin	29 August
Silver	Shariz Efendi	Cycling	Men's keirin	29 August
Silver	Players:	Football	Men's team	29 August
Silver	Fazrul Azrie	Weightlifting	Men's 85kg	30 August
Bronze	Fatin Nurfatehah Mat Salleh	Archery	Women's compound	16 August
Bronze	Muhammad Faiz bin Roslan; Nur Hidayat Ar Rasyid; Muhd Haiqal Damanhuri; Putera Aidil Israfil bin Kamaruzaman; Muhamad Asyraaf bin Abdul Hadi; Muhd Azwan Muhrim; Muhd Shakirin Md Nasir; Iskandar Zulkarnain bin Salim	Sepak takraw	Chinlone – same stroke	16 August
Bronze	Mohd Nazuha bin Mohd Nazli; Mohd Zarlizan bin Zakaria; Muhamad Asyraaf bin Abdul Hadi; Muhammad Haiqal bin Damanhuri; Muhammad Idham bin Sulaiman; Muhammad Noraizat bin Mohd Nordin; Nur Hidayat Ar Rasyid bin Ahmad Daud; Wan Muhammad Syazwan bin Wan Mohd Asri	Sepak takraw	Chinlone – non-repetition secondary	17 August
Bronze	Muhaizar Mohamad	Athletics	Men's marathon	19 August
Bronze	Farhan Adam; Meor Mohamad Zulfikar; Mohamad Azlan Alias; Mohammad Syahir Mohd Rosdi; Mohd Hanafiah Dollah; Mohd Khairol Zaman Hamir Akhbar; Mohd Safarudin Abu Bakar; Mohd Syazreen Qamar Salehan; Muhamad Norhaffizi Abd Razak; Muhammad Hairul Hazizi Haidzir; Muhammad Zaim Razali; Said Ezwan Said De	Sepak takraw	Men's team Regu	19 August
Bronze	Chai Jie Lun; Tan Yi Xun; Chiew Chern Kwang; Toh Yi Xiang; Tan Tsien Hann; Toh Yi Hang; Mohd Irshad Syahir Abd Halim; Anderson Wong Yong Hui; Soh Yong Wee; Daryl Khoo Tiong Jinn; Leung Chee Liang; Fam Jia Yi; Hor Jia Yang	Water polo	Men's team	20 August
Bronze	Shalin Zulkifli	Bowling	Women's singles	20 August
Bronze	Nur Aliya Ghapar	Archery	Women's recurve	20 August
Bronze	Fasha Fauzie; Farahana Aziz; Dayang Manggie; Euphrasia Anne; Normasyirah Zahari; Fidelia Telajan; Henrietta David; Siti Farhanita; Wan Zufirah; Rozliana Ridwan; Cindy John; Christina Edris	Rugby sevens	Women's team	20 August
Bronze	Khaw Jun Lim	Wushu	Men's optional daoshu + gunshu	21 August
Bronze	Irene Chong See Wing	Triathlon	Women's individual	21 August
Bronze	Zamri Saleh	Cycling	Men's criterium	21 August
Bronze	Audrey Chan Yee Jo	Wushu	Women's optional taijijian	21 August
Bronze	Ho Mun Hua	Wushu	Men's optional nandao + nangun	21 August
Bronze	Tracie Ang	Gymnastics	Artistic women's vault	22 August
Bronze	Abdul Rahman Lee	Athletics	Men's discus throw	22 August
Bronze	Suhartisera Zamri	Pétanque	Women's singles	22 August
Bronze	Khairunneeta Mohd Afendy; Nur Shazrin Mohamad Latif; Nurliyana Mohamad Latif	Sailing	Women's team Laser Radial	22 August
Bronze	Khairil Harith	Athletics	Men's 20000m walk	22 August
Bronze	Ahmad Aizat Mohd Nor Azmi; Aidil Aiman Azwawi; Amirul Zazwan Amir; Muhamad Suhairi Sulaiman; Muhammad Afifuddin Mohd Razali; Muhammad Kamal Ishak; Norshahrudin Md Ghani; Wan Muhd Anas Muhaimi; Zuleffendi Sumari	Sepak takraw	Men's team Doubles	22 August
Bronze	Daniel Lim	Swimming	Men's 200m breaststroke	22 August
Bronze	Ziyad Zolkefli	Athletics	Men's shot put	22 August
Bronze	Jeremiah Loo	Gymnastics	Men's Horizontal Bar	23 August
Bronze	Joshua Koh I-Jie	Fencing	Men's épée	23 August
Bronze	S Prem Kumar	Karate	Men's kumite below 55kg	23 August
Bronze	M. Mathivani	Karate	Women's kumite below 68kg	23 August
Bronze	Bowlers:	Bowling	Women's trios	23 August
Bronze	Somanroy Arulveeran	Karate	Men's kumite Above 75kg	23 August
Bronze	Royson Vincent	Athletics	Men's 800m	23 August
Bronze	Farez Izwan; Ong Sai Hung	Squash	Men's doubles	23 August
Bronze	G. Thevarr	Athletics	Men's 200m	23 August
Bronze	Moh Keen Hoo; Thor Chuan Leong	Billiards and snooker	Men's snooker doubles	23 August
Bronze	Bibiana Ng Pei Chin	Shooting	Women's 10m air pistol	24 August
Bronze	Indran Rama Krishnan	Boxing	Men's Middleweight	24 August
Bronze	Arvindran Muruges; Ravin Vijaya Kumar; Shaharudin Jamaludin; Sharmendran Raghonathan; Somanroy Arulveeran	Karate	Men's team kumite	24 August
Bronze	Iskandar Alwi	Athletics	Men's pole vault	24 August
Bronze	Swimmers:	Swimming	Men's 4x200m freestyle relay	24 August
Bronze	Yap Sean Yee	Athletics	Women's high jump	24 August
Bronze	Players:	Ice hockey	Men's team	24 August
Bronze	Jawairiah Noordin; Theiviya Selvarajoo	Tennis	Men's team	25 August
Bronze	Players:	Sepak takraw	Men's Quadrant	25 August
Bronze	Zubair Mohammad	Shooting	Men's 50m rifle 3 positions	25 August
Bronze	Players:	Indoor hockey	Women's team	25 August
Bronze	Alex Liew	Bowling	Men's masters	25 August
Bronze	Caroline Chan Zi Xin	Swimming	Women's 50m backstroke	25 August
Bronze	Nur Suryani Taibi	Shooting	Women's 50m rifle 3 positions	26 August
Bronze	Golfers:	Golf	Women's team	26 August
Bronze	Players:	Table tennis	Women's team	26 August
Bronze	Players:	Pétanque	Men's triples	26 August
Bronze	Nur Quraataina	Cycling	Women's BMX	26 August
Bronze	Nik Norlydiawati Azman	Judo	Women's 63kg	26 August
Bronze	Mohd Farhan Uzair Fikri	Judo	Men's 73kg	26 August
Bronze	Athletes:	Athletics	Women's 4x400m relay	26 August
Bronze	Players:	Table tennis	Men's team	26 August
Bronze	Klaudia Djajalie	Billiards and snooker	Women's 9-ball pool singles	27 August
Bronze	Suhana Dewi Sabtu	Billiards and snooker	Women's 9-ball pool singles	27 August
Bronze	Sailors:	Sailing	Women's international 420 (U19)	27 August
Bronze	Players:	Sepak takraw	Women's doubles	27 August
Bronze	Kai Xiang	Figure skating	Men's singles	27 August
Bronze	Nur Intan Zulaikha Mohd Firdaus	Taekwondo	Women's kyorugi lightweight 62kg	27 August
Bronze	Thinagaran Naidu Papunaidu	Taekwondo	Men's kyorugi lightweight 74kg	27 August
Bronze	Nor Izzatul Fazlia	Judo	Women's 78kg	27 August
Bronze	Jupha Somnet	Cycling	Women's omnium	27 August
Bronze	Mohd Qabil Ambak	Equestrian	Individual show jumping	28 August
Bronze	Players:	Cricket	Women's Twenty20	28 August
Bronze	Players:	Pétanque	Mixed doubles	28 August
Bronze	Kimberly Bong	Diving	Women's 10m platform	28 August
Bronze	Illham Wahab	Sailing	Men's windsurfing RS one	28 August
Bronze	Jasmin Nabilla Sukardi	Taekwondo	Women's kyorugi bantamweight 53kg	28 August
Bronze	Syahir Nasir	Waterskiing	Men's slalom	29 August
Bronze	Syahir Nasir	Waterskiing	Men's jumping	29 August
Bronze	Nurul Annisa	Pencak silat	Women's tanding (match) class A 45-50kg	29 August
Bronze	Mastafa Fitri	Pencak silat	Women's tanding (match) class A 45-50kg	29 August
Bronze	Chan Peng Soon; Cheah Yee See	Badminton	Mixed doubles	29 August
Bronze	Ariff Rasydan	Short track speed skating	Men's 500m	29 August
Bronze	Khusairy Azhar	Pencak silat	Men's tanding (match) class G 75-80kg	29 August
Bronze	Badrirullah	Pencak silat	Men's tanding (match) class I 85-90kg	29 August
Bronze	Khairulnizam Afendy	Sailing	Men's Laser standard	29 August
Bronze	Vivian Hoo Kah Mun; Woon Khe Wei	Badminton	Women's doubles	29 August
Bronze	Muhamad Samsi	Muaythai	Men's 67kg	29 August
Bronze	Loro Wellkinson Peuji	Weightlifting	Men's 77kg	29 August
Bronze	Lee Yen Feng	Taekwondo	Men's kyorugi bantamweight 63kg	29 August
Bronze	Nurul Nur Hafizzah Mahdi	Taekwondo	Women's kyorugi middleweight 73kg	29 August
Bronze	Players:	Squash	Men's team	29 August
Bronze	Ashley Chin	Short track speed skating	Women's 1000m	30 August
Bronze	Hazim Shahrum	Short track speed skating	Men's 1000m	30 August
