= Equestrian at the 2017 SEA Games =

- Venue: Putrajaya Equestrian Park; Terengganu International Endurance Park
- Date: 20–28 August 2017

The equestrian competitions at the 2017 Southeast Asian Games in Kuala Lumpur were held at Putrajaya Equestrian Park and Terengganu International Endurance Park.

The 2017 Games feature competitions in six events (all events for mixed).

== Events ==
The following events will be contested:

- Dressage
  - Individual
  - Team
- Endurance
  - Individual
  - Team
- Show Jumping
  - Individual
  - Team

=== Officials ===
The following officials were appointed to officiate during the SEA-Games.

Dressage

- (Belgium) Freddy Leyman (Ground Jury President)
- (Australia) Jane Ventura (Ground Jury Member)
- (New Zealand) Susan Hobson (Ground Jury Member)
- (Germany) Peter Holler (Ground Jury Member)
- (Denmark) Kirsten Soegaard (Ground Jury Member)
- (Australia) Mary Seefried (Technical Delegate)

Jumping

- (Malaysia) Mou Soon Yap (Ground Jury President)
- (Singapore) Nai Yue Ho (Ground Jury Member)
- (Philippines) Steven Cesar Gamboa Virata (Ground Jury Member)
- (Thailand) Pakin Chamswad (Ground Jury Member)
- (Iran) Rakshan Radpour (Technical Delegate)

Endurance

- (Thailand) Phuttiphat Sethchaivuth (Ground Jury President)
- (Malaysia) Hamdan Mohd (Ground Jury Member)
- (Myanmar) Aye Thetta (Ground Jury Member)
- (Singapore) Peter Tan Choon Heng (Ground Jury Member)
- (India) Sundar Rethinavel (Technical Delegate)

== Participation ==
=== Participating nations ===
- Brunei
- Cambodia
- Indonesia
- Laos
- Malaysia
- Myanmar
- Philippines
- Singapore
- Thailand
- Timor-Leste
- Vietnam

== Medal summary ==
=== Medal table ===
* Host nation (Malaysia)

Rank	Nation	Gold	Silver	Bronze	Total
1	Malaysia*	6	3	0	9
2	Thailand	0	3	1	4
3	Singapore	0	0	2	2
4	Brunei	0	0	1	1
4	Cambodia	0	0	1	1
4	Indonesia	0	0	1	1
Totals (6 entries)		6	6	6	18

=== Medalists ===
Event	Gold	Silver	Bronze
Individual dressage	Malaysia: Quzandria Nur Mahamad Fathil on Rosenstolz	Malaysia: Mohd Qabil Ambak Mahamad Fathil on Walkuere	Singapore: Caroline Chew on Tribiani
Team dressage	Malaysia: Edric Lee Chin Hon on Windsor; Mohd Qabil Ambak Mahamad Fathil on Walkuere; Quek Sue Yian on Always Magic; Quzandria Nur Mahamad Fathil on Rosenstolz	Thailand: Arinadtha Chavatanont on Clapton C; Chalermcharn Yotviriyapanit on Best of Nymphenburg; Princess Sirivannavari Nariratana on Prince Charming WPA; Pakjira Thongpakdi on Hispania 7	Singapore: Catherine Oh Yung-Wen on Vlicka; Caroline Chew on Tribiani; Predrag Marjanovic on Hofdame; Natalie Pinruo Tan on Romaniero
Individual endurance	Malaysia: Sultan Mizan Zainal Abidin on RTES Anniversary	Malaysia: Mohd Bulkhari Rozali on JQ Tuan Junior	Thailand: Warit Khuntaraporn on Shardell Prince Ali
Team endurance	Malaysia: Azizatul Asma Abdullah on Mora Tishaka; Mohamad Adhwa Embong on Mora Franka; Mohammad Fuad Hashim on Mora Makaka; Mohd Yusran Yusuf on Castlebar Twilight	Thailand: Kanapos Taytaisong on Burralga Janita; Kitikorn Nonbueng on Shardell Galazan; Prutirat Ratanakul Serireongrith on Absolut; Wipawan Pawitayalarp on The Horses Born Boogie	Cambodia: Lon Sopheaktra on VV Coco; Ly Sovanchandara on Amanah Blue Prince; Phay Visal on Brookleigh Kentara; Sim Narith on Yaldon Raakinda
Individual jumping (Note: In February 2018, Colin Syquia was stripped of his gold medal after his horse tested positive for Clomethiazole, a banned substance. Sharmini Christina Ratnasingham's silver medal was then elevated to gold.)	Malaysia: Sharmini Christina Ratnasingham on Arcado L	Malaysia: Mohd Qabil Ambak Mahamad Fathil on 3Q Qalisya	Brunei: Pg Mohd Nasir Pg Anak Ja'afar on Hunters Canatano Z
Team jumping	Malaysia: Mohd Qabil Ambak Mahamad Fathil on 3Q Qalisya; Neelan Jonathan Ratnasingham on Queens Dancer; Praveen Nair Mathavan on Clear Cut; Sharmini Christina Ratnasingham on Arcado L	Thailand: Jarupon Limpichati on Irregular Choice; Korntawat Samran on Amadeus 882; Sailub Lertratanachai on Cagena Z; Siengsaw Lertratanachai on Courville L	Indonesia: Brayen Brata-Coolen on Grace 292; Ferry Wahyu Hadiyanto on Xandor; Kurniadi Katompo on Nastello; Raymen Kaunang on Conquistador

== See also ==
- Polo at the 2017 Southeast Asian Games
