= Water polo at the 2017 SEA Games =

- Venue: National Aquatic Centre
- Location: Kuala Lumpur, Malaysia
- Date: 15–20 August

Medalists
gold medal	Singapore men
gold medal	Thailand women

The water polo competitions at the 2017 SEA Games in Bukit Jalil, Kuala Lumpur took place at National Aquatic Centre. It was one of four aquatic sports at the Games, along with diving, swimming, and synchronised swimming.

The 2017 Games featured competitions in both men's and women's events.

== Competition schedule ==
The following was the competition schedule for the water polo competitions:

RR	Round robin

Event	Tue 15	Wed 16	Thu 17	Fri 18	Sat 19	Sun 20
Men	RR	RR	RR	RR		RR
Women	RR	RR			RR	

== Participation ==
=== Men's tournament ===
- Indonesia
- Malaysia
- Philippines
- Singapore
- Thailand

=== Women's tournament ===
- Indonesia
- Malaysia
- Singapore
- Thailand

== Men's competition ==
Pos	Team	Pld	W	D	L	GF	GA	GD	Pts	Final Result
1	Singapore	4	3	1	0	41	15	+26	7	Gold medal
2	Indonesia	4	3	1	0	29	15	+14	7	Silver medal
3	Malaysia (H)	4	2	0	2	26	35	−9	4	Bronze medal
4	Philippines	4	1	0	3	26	34	−8	2	
5	Thailand	4	0	0	4	19	42	−23	0	

(H) Hosts

== Women's competition ==
Pos	Team	Pld	W	D	L	GF	GA	GD	Pts	Final Result
1	Thailand	3	3	0	0	39	7	+32	6	Gold medal
2	Singapore	3	2	0	1	20	17	+3	4	Silver medal
3	Indonesia	3	1	0	2	17	20	−3	2	Bronze medal
4	Malaysia (H)	3	0	0	3	9	41	−32	0	

Source: Schedule & Results
(H) Hosts

== Medal summary ==
=== Medal table ===
Host nation

Rank	Nation	Gold	Silver	Bronze	Total
1	Singapore (SGP)	1	1	0	2
2	Thailand (THA)	1	0	0	1
3	Indonesia (INA)	0	1	1	2
4	Malaysia (MAS)*	0	0	1	1
Totals (4 entries)		2	2	2	6

=== Medalists ===
Event	Gold	Silver	Bronze
Men's tournament	Singapore (SGP); Sean Ang Wei Ming; Ang An Jun; Chow Jing Lun; Darren Lee Jit An; Koh Jian Ying; Chiam Kun Yang; Lee Kai Yang; Loh Zhi Zhi; Ooi Yee Jia; Samuel Moses Yu Nan-Feng; Bryan Ong Wei Loong; Yip Yang; Yu Junjie	Indonesia (INA); Muhammad Zaki; Beby Willy Eka; Muhammad Hamid Firdaus; Silvester Golberg Manik; Maulana Bayu Herfianto; Benny Respati; Yusuf Budiman; Rezza Auditya Putra; Delvin Felliciano; Ridjkie Mulia; Rian Rinaldo; Zaenal Arifin; Novian Dwi Putra	Malaysia (MAS); Chai Jie Lun; Tan Yi Xun; Chiew Chern Kwang; Toh Yi Xiang; Tan Tsien Hann; Toh Yi Hang; Mohd Irshad Syahir Abd Halim; Anderson Wong Yong Hui; Soh Yong Wee; Daryl Khoo Tiong Jinn; Leung Chee Liang; Fam Jia Yi; Hor Jia Yang
Women's tournament	Thailand (THA); Alwani Sathitanon; Kaithip Saeteaw; Khemasiri Sirivejjabandh; Kornkarn Puengpongsakul; Nirawan Chompoopuen; Pranisa Nilklad; Pratchayaporn Nuch-Ong; Rojnaree Taweechai; Sarocha Rewrujirek; Sineenart Sonthipakdee; Thawanrat Wongpairoj; Thitirat Somyos; Varistha Saraikrarn	Singapore (SGP); Cleona Zhu Yinxuan; Gina Koh Ting Yi; Shauna Christine Sim Hwei Sian; Naomi Yap Xiao Fei; Koh Xiao Li; Loke En Yuan; Angeline Teo Yi Ling; Lynnette Jane Tan Hui Ying; Ng Yi Wen; Melissa Ooi Si Hui; Sheryl Tan Hui Ning; Wu Zhekang; Eunice Karina Fu Yumin	Indonesia (INA); Ayudya Suidarwanty Pratiwi; Annisa Rachmawati; Alya Nadira Trifiansyah; Dewi Ratih; Ivy Nernie Priscilla; Hanna Firdaus; Upiet Sarimanah; Hudaidah Kadir; Inez Febrianti Rasyid; Nyoman Ayu Savitri Arsana; Rani Raida; Siti Balkis; Dinda Nur Asmarandana
