= Figure skating at the 2017 SEA Games =

- Venues: Empire City Mall
- Location: Malaysia
- Date: August 26-27, 2017
- Teams: 6 (see below)

Champions
- Men: (Malaysia) Julian Zhi-Jie Yee

The figure skating competitions at the 2017 Southeast Asian Games in Kuala Lumpur were held at Empire City in Selangor.

The 2017 Games feature competitions in two events, men's and ladies' singles. It served as a qualifying event for the 2018 Winter Olympics

== Competition schedule ==
Date	Time	Category	Segment
26/8/2017			
	15:00:00	Senior Ladies	Short Program
	16:30:00	Senior Men	Short Program
27/8/2017			
	14:30:00	Senior Ladies	Free Skating
	16:20:00	Senior Men	Free Skating

== Men ==
=== Short program ===
Pl.	Name	Nation	TSS =	TES +	PCS +	SS	TR	PE	CO	IN	Deduction -	StN.
1	Julian Zhi-Jie Yee	Malaysia	73.03	39.70	33.33	6.75	6.33	6.92	6.50	6.83	0.00	#7
2	Michael Christian Martinez	Philippines	54.74	25.49	31.25	6.33	6.17	6.08	6.42	6.25	2.00	#8
3	Micah Kai Lynette	Thailand	54.63	30.12	24.51	5.25	4.67	5.00	4.92	4.67	0.00	#6
4	Kai Xiang Chew	Malaysia	47.71	20.80	26.91	5.33	5.08	5.42	5.50	5.58	0.00	#9
5	Jules Vince Alpe	Philippines	41.14	16.40	25.74	5.25	4.75	5.08	5.33	5.33	1.00	#2
6	Alberto Widjaja	Indonesia	38.72	20.30	18.42	3.83	3.42	3.75	3.75	3.67	0.00	#1
7	William Sutrisna	Indonesia	38.33	18.33	21.00	4.17	3.75	4.25	4.33	4.50	1.00	#4
8	Bunthoeurn Sen	Cambodia	10.92	3.00	7.92	1.75	1.33	1.50	1.67	1.67	0.00	#3
9	Panha Khiev	Cambodia	7.80	1.39	7.41	1.67	1.33	1.50	1.33	1.58	1.00	#5
TSS = Total Segment Score; TES = Technical Element Score; PCS = Program Component Score; SS = Skating Skills; TR = Transitions; PE = Performance; CO = Composition; IN = Interpretation of the Music

=== Free skating ===
Pl.	Name	Nation	TSS =	TES +	PCS +	SS	TR	PE	CO	IN	Deduction -	StN.
1	Julian Zhi-Jie Yee	Malaysia	132.40	63.42	68.98	6.83	6.33	7.25	6.83	7.25	0.00	#9
2	Michael Christian Martinez	Philippines	116.89	54.55	64.34	6.50	6.00	6.42	6.58	6.67	2.00	#8
3	Kai Xiang Chew	Malaysia	97.81	46.31	52.50	5.50	4.92	5.08	5.50	5.25	1.00	#6
4	Micah Kai Lynette	Thailand	83.18	41.34	45.84	4.92	4.25	4.50	4.67	4.58	4.00	#7
5	Alberto Widjaja	Indonesia	80.88	38.38	42.50	4.42	4.00	4.33	4.33	4.17	0.00	#4
6	Jules Vince Alpe	Philippines	71.75	31.93	45.82	5.08	4.00	4.25	4.83	4.75	6.00	#5
7	William Sutrisna	Indonesia	58.34	26.48	33.86	3.67	2.92	3.25	3.42	3.67	2.00	#3
8	Bunthoeurn Sen	Cambodia	25.31	10.63	16.68	1.75	1.50	1.67	1.67	1.75	2.00	#2
9	Panha Khiev	Cambodia	24.61	8.77	15.84	1.67	1.50	1.67	1.58	1.50	0.00	#1
TSS = Total Segment Score; TES = Technical Element Score; PCS = Program Component Score; SS = Skating Skills; TR = Transitions; PE = Performance; CO = Composition; IN = Interpretation of the Music

=== Overall ===
Rank	Name	Nation	Total	SP		FS	
1	Julian Zhi-Jie Yee	Malaysia	205.43	1	73.03	1	132.40
2	Michael Christian Martinez	Philippines	171.63	2	54.74	2	116.89
3	Kai Xiang Chew	Malaysia	145.52	4	47.71	3	97.81
4	Micah Kai Lynette	Thailand	137.81	3	54.63	4	83.18
5	Alberto Widjaja	Indonesia	119.60	6	38.72	5	80.88
6	Jules Vince Alpe	Philippines	112.89	5	41.14	6	71.75
7	William Sutrisna	Indonesia	96.67	7	38.33	7	58.34
8	Bunthoeurn Sen	Cambodia	36.23	8	10.92	8	25.31
9	Panha Khiev	Cambodia	32.41	9	7.80	9	24.61

== Ladies ==
=== Short program ===
Pl.	Name	Nation	TSS =	TES +	PCS +	SS	TR	PE	CO	IN	Deduction -	StN.
1	Yu Shuran	Singapore	53.28	29.40	23.88	5.92	5.58	6.25	5.92	6.17	0.00	#7
2	Alisson Krystle Perticheto	Philippines	48.54	27.16	21.38	5.50	4.75	5.58	5.33	5.58	0.00	#1
3	Chloe Xuanling Ing	Singapore	45.68	23.94	21.74	5.42	5.33	5.17	5.67	5.58	0.00	#8
4	Natalie Pailin Sangkagalo	Thailand	39.39	22.17	17.22	4.67	3.92	4.42	4.42	4.08	0.00	#3
5	Tasya Putri	Indonesia	29.69	14.63	15.06	3.83	3.25	3.75	3.83	4.17	0.00	#5
6	Thita Lamsam	Thailand	25.84	12.10	13.74	3.67	3.25	3.25	3.50	3.50	0.00	#9
7	Aneeta Lingam	Malaysia	24.24	10.28	14.96	3.92	3.42	3.75	3.92	3.67	1.00	#2
8	Erika Sanjaya	Indonesia	22.10	11.44	12.66	3.33	3.08	3.08	3.17	3.17	2.00	#6
9	Aina Sorfina Mohd Aminudin	Malaysia	17.37	8.51	12.86	3.42	3.08	2.83	3.33	3.42	4.00	#4
TSS = Total Segment Score; TES = Technical Element Score; PCS = Program Component Score; SS = Skating Skills; TR = Transitions; PE = Performance; CO = Composition; IN = Interpretation of the Music

=== Free skating ===
Pl.	Name	Nation	TSS =	TES +	PCS +	SS	TR	PE	CO	IN	Deduction -	StN.
1	Chloe Xuanling Ing	Singapore	82.93	39.14	44.79	5.50	5.08	5.58	5.83	6.00	1.00	#7
2	Yu Shuran	Singapore	82.24	37.31	44.93	5.83	5.25	5.58	5.67	5.75	0.00	#9
3	Natalie Pailin Sangkagalo	Thailand	73.50	40.24	34.26	4.58	3.75	4.33	4.42	4.33	1.00	#6
4	Alisson Krystle Perticheto	Philippines	64.86	31.87	37.99	5.33	4.33	4.75	4.75	4.58	5.00	#8
5	Aneeta Lingam	Malaysia	58.44	27.23	31.21	3.92	3.67	4.00	3.92	4.00	0.00	#3
6	Thita Lamsam	Thailand	53.20	25.53	28.67	4.00	3.25	3.50	3.67	3.50	1.00	#4
7	Aina Sorfina Mohd Aminudin	Malaysia	51.93	23.40	28.53	3.75	3.25	3.67	3.58	3.58	0.00	#1
8	Erika Sanjaya	Indonesia	51.75	26.01	25.74	3.42	2.92	3.25	3.42	3.08	0.00	#2
9	Tasya Putri	Indonesia	47.78	20.10	28.68	3.67	3.17	3.67	3.67	3.75	1.00	#5
TSS = Total Segment Score; TES = Technical Element Score; PCS = Program Component Score; SS = Skating Skills; TR = Transitions; PE = Performance; CO = Composition; IN = Interpretation of the Music

=== Overall ===
Rank	Name	Nation	Total	SP		FS	
1	Yu Shuran	Singapore	135.52	1	53.28	2	82.24
2	Chloe Xuanling Ing	Singapore	128.61	3	45.68	1	82.93
3	Alisson Krystle Perticheto	Philippines	113.40	2	48.54	4	64.86
4	Natalie Pailin Sangkagalo	Thailand	112.89	4	38.39	3	74.50
5	Aneeta Lingam	Malaysia	82.68	7	24.24	5	58.44
6	Thita Lamsam	Thailand	79.04	6	25.84	6	53.20
7	Tasya Putri	Indonesia	77.47	5	29.69	9	47.78
8	Erika Sanjaya	Indonesia	73.85	8	22.10	8	51.75
9	Aina Sorfina Mohd Aminudin	Malaysia	69.30	9	17.37	7	51.93
WD	Samantha Cabiles	Philippines					

== Participating nations ==
- Cambodia
- Indonesia
- Malaysia
- Philippines
- Singapore
- Thailand

== Medal summary ==
=== Medal table ===
* Host nation (Malaysia)

Rank	Nation	Gold	Silver	Bronze	Total
1	Singapore	1	1	0	2
2	Malaysia*	1	0	1	2
3	Philippines	0	1	1	2
Totals (3 entries)		2	2	2	6

=== Medalists ===
Event	Gold	Silver	Bronze
Men's singles	Julian Yee Zhi-Jie; Malaysia	Michael Christian Martinez; Philippines	Kai Xiang Chew; Malaysia
Women's singles	Yu Shuran; Singapore	Chloe Ing; Singapore	Alisson Krystle Perticheto; Philippines
