= Indoor hockey at the 2017 SEA Games =

- Indoor hockey pictogram
- Venue: MATRADE Exhibition and Convention Centre
- Date: 21–26 August 2017
- Nations: 6

The indoor hockey competitions at the 2017 SEA Games in Kuala Lumpur were held at MATRADE Exhibition and Convention Centre in Segambut.

The 2017 Games feature competitions in two events (men's and women's).

== Participation ==
=== Participating nations ===
- Indonesia
- Malaysia
- Philippines
- Singapore
- Thailand
- Vietnam

== Men's competition ==
=== Group stage ===
Pos	Team	Pld	W	D	L	GF	GA	GD	Pts	Qualification
1	Malaysia (H)	5	5	0	0	45	2	+43	15	Gold medal match
2	Indonesia	5	4	0	1	33	9	+24	12	Gold medal match
3	Thailand	5	3	0	2	33	10	+23	9	Bronze medal match
4	Singapore	5	2	0	3	10	9	+1	6	Bronze medal match
5	Vietnam	5	1	0	4	5	40	−35	3	Fifth place game
6	Philippines	5	0	0	5	2	58	−56	0	Fifth place game

Source: KL2017 Official Website
(H) Hosts

== Women's competition ==
=== Group stage ===
Pos	Team	Pld	W	D	L	GF	GA	GD	Pts	Final Result
1	Indonesia	4	3	1	0	18	1	+17	10	Advanced to Gold medal match
2	Thailand	4	3	0	1	19	2	+17	9	Advanced to Gold medal match
3	Malaysia (H)	4	2	1	1	26	4	+22	7	Advanced to Bronze medal match
4	Singapore	4	1	0	3	5	12	−7	3	Advanced to Bronze medal match
5	Philippines	4	0	0	4	0	49	−49	0	

Updated to match(es) played on 24 August 2017. Source: KL2017 Official Website
(H) Hosts

== Medal summary ==
=== Medal table ===
Host nation

Rank	Nation	Gold	Silver	Bronze	Total
1	Malaysia (MAS)*	1	0	1	2
2	Thailand (THA)	1	0	0	1
3	Indonesia (INA)	0	2	0	2
4	Singapore (SGP)	0	0	1	1
Totals (4 entries)		2	2	2	6

=== Medalists ===
Event	Gold	Silver	Bronze
Men's tournament	Malaysia (MAS); Khairul Afendy Kamaruzaman; Muhammad Najib Abu Hassan; Mohamad Ashran Hamsani; Muhammad Aslam Hanafiah; Shazril Irwan Nazli; Hanip Che Halim; Syed Mohamad Syafiq Cholan; Norsyafiq Sumantri; Muhd Amirol Aideed Arshad; Mohd Syafiq Yaacob; Muhd Najmi Farizal Jazlan; Mohamad Hazrul Faiz Sobri	Indonesia (INA); Tomi Effendi; Candra Juli Prawesti; Budi Akhmad; Daarul Quthni; Zein Hamdani; Zaki Lukman Hakim; Prima Rinaldi Santoso; Adit Tri Juwantoro; Alvin Nourul Saepul Mimbar; Iskandar Zulkarnaen; Astri Rahmad; Dea Dwi Permana	Singapore (SGP); Aik Yu Chen; Abdul Rahim Rashid; Samuel Nee Yong Liang; Ishwarpal Singh Grewal; Mohd Jumaeen Amat Kamsin; Karleef Abdullah Sasi; Muhammad Afiq Kanadi; Muhammad Fariz Basir; Timothy Goh Kai Yang; Muhammad Hidayat Mat Rahim; Muhammad Shafiq Rashid; Muhammad Radziman Husiadi
Women's tournament	Thailand (THA); Jesdaporn Tongsun; Kittiya Losantia; Ruenruedee Saubsing; Wibunsiri Phetpraphai; Benjamas Bureewan; Tikhamporn Sakunpithak; Kanya Jantapet; Chantree Ladawon; Thanaporn Tongkham; Sukanya Ritngam; Sairung Juwong; Praphatsorn Khamsaeng	Indonesia (INA); Dewi Andriani; Lina Lince Rumaropen; Euis Nuraeni; Novita Natalia Since Sada; Nuraini Sugiarti; Ika Oktavianti; Rwede Sabatine Tamar Sawor; Sismya Winarsih Kadarisman; Annur Amalia El Islamy; Greschela; Aulia Ghassani Putri Arindah; Sarah Amaniah	Malaysia (MAS); Siti Noor Hafiza Zainordin; Nor Aniza Rahmat; Nor Izaidah Ibrahim; Qasidah Najwa Halimi; Nurliyana Mohd Kip; Noorain Mohd Arshad; Ellya Syahirah Ellias; Rabiatul Adawiyah Mohamed; Nur Aisyah Yaacob; Priyangga S. Jayarajah; Nurul Safiqah Mat Isa; Fatin Naimah Zaki
