= Lucas Ng =

Singaporean speed skater

Personal information
- Full name: Lucas Ng Jun Jie
- Born: 13 October 1988 (age 37)

Chinese name
- Simplified Chinese: 黄俊杰
- Traditional Chinese: 黃俊傑
- Hanyu Pinyin: Huáng Jùnjié
- Hokkien POJ: N̂g Chùnkia̍t

Sport
- Country: Singapore
- Sport: Short track speed skating

—- Lucas Ng Jun Jie (born 13 October 1988) is a Singaporean short track speed skater. He became the first Singaporean athlete to compete at a major winter sport event at the 2011 Asian Winter Games. His participation drew praise from parliamentary secretary Teo Ser Luck who said "We should just celebrate the fact that Singapore has its first winter athlete. We've never had a winter athlete and this in itself is a breakthrough." In August 2017, Ng suffered a serious injury due to a training accident in which a tendon in his right hand was severed by the blade of a skater who fell down in front of him. He underwent surgery requiring ten stitches, but ten days later had recovered sufficiently from his injuries to win the silver medal in the men's 1000 metres in short track speed skating at the 2017 Southeast Asian Games.
