= Shooting at the 2017 SEA Games =

- Venue: National Shooting Range Centre
- Location: Subang, Malaysia
- Date: 21–26 August 2017

The shooting competitions at the 2017 SEA Games were held at National Shooting Range Centre in Subang, Selangor.

The 2017 Games feature competitions in 14 events, 9 for men and 5 for women.

== Medal table ==
* Host nation (Malaysia)

Rank	Nation	Gold	Silver	Bronze	Total
1	Thailand (THA)	5	2	5	12
2	Malaysia (MAS)*	4	5	3	12
3	Singapore (SGP)	2	4	2	8
4	Vietnam (VIE)	1	3	0	4
5	Myanmar (MYA)	1	0	3	4
6	Indonesia (INA)	1	0	0	1
7	Philippines (PHI)	0	0	1	1
Totals (7 entries)		14	14	14	42

== Medalists ==
=== Men ===
Event	Gold	Silver	Bronze
10 m air pistol	Johnathan Wong; Malaysia	Hoàng Xuân Vinh; Vietnam	Kyaw Swar Win; Myanmar
50 m pistol	Natphanlert Auapinyakul; Thailand	Johnathan Wong; Malaysia	Kyaw Swar Win; Myanmar
25 m rapid fire pistol	Hà Minh Thành; Vietnam	Hasli Izwan; Malaysia	Pornchai Sukhonpanich; Thailand
10 m air rifle	Muhammad Naufal Mahardika; Indonesia	Mohamad Irwan Abdul Rahman; Singapore	Napis Tortungpanich; Thailand
50 m rifle 3 positions	Napis Tortungpanich; Thailand	Nguyễn Duy Hoàng; Vietnam	Muhamad Zubair Mohammad; Malaysia
50 m rifle prone	Muhd Ezuan Nasir Khan; Malaysia	Ong Jun Hong; Singapore	Kaung Htike; Myanmar
Skeet	Jiranunt Hathaichukiat; Thailand	Joseph Lee; Malaysia	Tanapat Jangpanich; Thailand
Trap	Yodchai Phachonyut; Thailand	Bernard Yeoh; Malaysia	Zain Amat; Singapore
Double trap	Benjamin Khor; Malaysia	Abraham Eng; Malaysia	Sirawit Temmart; Thailand

=== Women ===
Event	Gold	Silver	Bronze
10 m air pistol	May Poe Wah; Myanmar	Lê Thị Linh Chi; Vietnam	Bibiana Ng; Malaysia
25 m pistol	Alia Sazana Azahari; Malaysia	Teh Xiu Hong; Singapore	Nicole Tan; Singapore
10 m air rifle	Martina Veloso; Singapore	Jasmine Ser; Singapore	Nawinda Kasemkiatthai; Thailand
50 m rifle 3 positions	Jasmine Ser; Singapore	Ratchadaporn Plengsaengthong; Thailand	Nur Suryani Taibi; Malaysia
50 m rifle prone	Ratchadaporn Plengsaengthong; Thailand	Supamas Wankaew; Thailand	Amparo Teresa Acuña; Philippines
