= Wushu at the 2017 SEA Games =

- Venue: Kuala Lumpur Convention Centre
- Location: Kuala Lumpur, Malaysia
- Date: 20–22 August 2017

The wushu competitions at the 2017 SEA Games in Kuala Lumpur were held at Kuala Lumpur Convention Centre.

The 2017 Games feature competitions in 17 events, 8 for men and 9 for women.

== Medal table ==
* Host nation (Malaysia)

Rank	Nation	Gold	Silver	Bronze	Total
1	Malaysia (MAS)*	6	5	3	14
2	Vietnam (VIE)	3	4	3	10
3	Indonesia (INA)	3	3	3	9
4	Myanmar (MYA)	2	2	2	6
5	Singapore (SGP)	2	1	5	8
6	Philippines (PHI)	1	1	0	2
7	Brunei (BRU)	0	1	1	2
Totals (7 entries)		17	17	17	51

== Medalists ==
=== Men ===
Event	Gold	Silver	Bronze
Changquan	Jowen Lim Si Wei; Singapore	Trần Xuân Hiệp; Vietnam	Edgar Xavier Marvelo; Indonesia
Daoshu / Gunshu	Jowen Lim Si Wei; Singapore	Achmad Hulaefi; Indonesia	Khaw Jun Lim; Malaysia
Jianshu	Yeap Wai Kin; Malaysia	Wong Weng Son; Malaysia	Fung Jin Jie; Singapore
Qiangshu	Yeap Wai Kin; Malaysia	Wong Weng Son; Malaysia	Muhammad Daffa Golden Boy; Indonesia
Nanquan	Ho Mun Hua; Malaysia	Phạm Quốc Khánh; Vietnam	Md Sufi Shayiran bin Roslan; Brunei
Nandao / Nangun	Thein Than Oo; Myanmar	Phạm Quốc Khánh; Vietnam	Ho Mun Hua; Malaysia
Taijiquan	Loh Jack Chang; Malaysia	Samuel Tan Wei Han; Singapore	Khant Min Htet; Myanmar
Taijijian	Loh Jack Chang; Malaysia	Bobie Valentius Gunawan; Indonesia	Chan Jun Kai; Singapore

=== Women ===
Event	Gold	Silver	Bronze
Changquan	Myat Thet Hsu Wai Phyo; Myanmar	Sandy Oo; Myanmar	Hoàng Thị Phương Giang; Vietnam
Daoshu	Felda Elvira Santoso; Indonesia	Monica Pransisca Sugianto; Indonesia	Zoe Mui Wei Ting; Singapore
Gunshu	Hoàng Thị Phương Giang; Vietnam	Loh Ying Ting; Malaysia	Felda Elvira Santoso; Indonesia
Jianshu	Dương Thúy Vi; Vietnam	Phoon Eyin; Malaysia	Fung Hui Xin; Singapore
Qiangshu	Dương Thúy Vi; Vietnam	Phoon Eyin; Malaysia	Sandy Oo; Myanmar
Nanquan	Diana Bong Siong Lin; Malaysia	Aye Thitsar Myint; Myanmar	Nguyễn Thục Anh; Vietnam
Nandao / Nangun	Juwita Niza Wasni; Indonesia	Nguyễn Thùy Linh; Vietnam	Nguyễn Thục Anh; Vietnam
Taijiquan	Agatha Wong; Philippines	Basma Lachkar; Brunei	Ho Lin Ying; Singapore
Taijijian	Lindswell Kwok; Indonesia	Agatha Wong; Philippines	Audrey Chan Yee Jo; Malaysia
