= Singapore at the 2017 SEA Games =

Singapore at the 2017 Southeast Asian Games
- IOC code: SGP
- NOC: Singapore National Olympic Council
- Website: www.singaporeolympics.com (in English)

in Kuala Lumpur, Langkawi
- Competitors: 569 in 35 sports
- Flag bearer: Jasmine Ser (Shooting)
- Medals Ranked 4th: Gold 58 Silver 58 Bronze 72 Total 188

Southeast Asian Games appearances (overview)
- 1959; 1961; 1965; 1967; 1969; 1971; 1973; 1975; 1977; 1979; 1981; 1983; 1985; 1987; 1989; 1991; 1993; 1995; 1997; 1999; 2001; 2003; 2005; 2007; 2009; 2011; 2013; 2015; 2017; 2019; 2021; 2023; 2025; 2027; 2029

Singapore participated in the 2017 Southeast Asian Games in Malaysia from 19 to 30 August 2017. It was held in the capital Kuala Lumpur and its surrounding areas as well as Langkawi for the Sailing competition.

== Competitors ==
A total of 569 athletes competed in 35 sports during this edition.

Sport	Men	Women	Total
Diving	4	4	8
Swimming	16	20	36
Synchronised Swimming	0	9	9
Water Polo	13	13	26
Archery	6	3	9
Athletics	17	12	29
Badminton	10	9	19
Basketball	12	12	24
Billiards and Snooker	6	2	8
Bowling	6	6	12
Boxing	5	0	5
Cricket	18	15	33
Cycling	12	4	16
Equestrian	12	8	20
Fencing	6	6	12
Football	20	0	30
Golf	4	3	7
Gymnastics–Artistic	4	6	10
Gymnastics–Rhythmic	0	7	7
Hockey-Field	18	18	36
Hockey-Indoor	12	12	24
Ice Hockey	20	0	20
Ice Skating (Figure)	0	2	2
Ice Skating (Speed)	5	5	10
Judo	3	0	3
Karate	1	1	2
Lawn Bowls	3	3	6
Muay	2	0	2
Netball	0	12	12
Pencak Silat	13	7	20
Pétanque	4	3	7
Rugby Sevens	12	12	24
Sailing	12	9	21
Shooting	11	6	17
Squash	7	5	12
Table Tennis	5	5	10
Taekwondo	1	4	5
Tennis	4	2	6
Triathlon	2	2	4
Wakeboard and Waterski	4	4	8
Wushu	6	6	12
Total	316	253	569

== Medal summary ==
A total of 188 medals were won at the Games, inclusive of 57 (now 58) Golds making this the best away Games performance.

=== Medal by sport ===
Medals by sport
Sport	1st place, gold medalist(s)	2nd place, silver medalist(s)	3rd place, bronze medalist(s)	Total
Archery	0	1	0	1
Athletics	2	2	4	8
Badminton	0	0	2	2
Basketball	0	0	0	0
Billiards and Snooker	3	0	1	4
Bowling	2	3	2	7
Boxing	0	0	3	3
Cricket	1	1	0	2
Cycling	1	1	1	3
Diving	1	8	3	12
Equestrian	0	0	2	2
Fencing	2	0	3	5
Football	0	0	0	0
Golf	1	1	0	2
Gymnastics	0	2	3	5
Ice Hockey	0	0	0	0
Ice Skating (Figure)	1	1	0	2
Ice Skating (Speed)	0	4	1	5
Indoor Hockey	0	0	1	1
Field Hockey	0	0	2	2
Judo	0	0	1	1
Karate	0	0	0	0
Lawn Bowls	0	1	1	2
Netball	0	1	0	1
Pencak Silat	2	4	6	12
Pétanque	0	0	0	0
Rugby Sevens	0	2	0	2
Sailing	4	3	5	12
Shooting	2	4	2	8
Squash	3	2	5	10
Swimming	19	6	10	35
Synchronised Swimming	3	2	2	7
Table Tennis	5	6	1	12
Taekwondo	0	0	1	1
Tennis	0	0	1	1
Triathlon	0	0	1	1
Waterskiing	3	2	2	7
Water polo	1	1	0	2
Wushu	2	1	5	8
Total	58	58	72	188

=== Medal by date ===
Medals by date
Day	Date	1st place, gold medalist(s)	2nd place, silver medalist(s)	3rd place, bronze medalist(s)	Total
–2	17 August	1	2	2	5
–1	18 August	1	1	0	2
0	19 August	1	1	0	2
1	20 August	5	7	4	16
2	21 August	5	3	5	13
3	22 August	7	7	11	25
4	23 August	7	3	7	17
5	24 August	7	8	5	20
6	25 August	5	2	5	12
7	26 August	7	3	15	25
8	27 August	2	6	7	15
9	28 August	1	2	5	8
10	29 August	9	8	5	22
11	30 August	0	5	1	6
Total		58	58	72	188
