= Sepak takraw at the 2017 SEA Games =

- Venue: Titiwangsa Indoor Stadium
- Location: Kuala Lumpur, Malaysia
- Dates: 16–29 August 2017
- Nations: 9

Sepak takraw at the 2017 SEA Games was held in Titiwangsa Indoor Stadium, Kuala Lumpur from 16 to 29 August 2017.

Chinlone which was introduced at the 2013 SEA Games in Myanmar was subsumed under the sport of Sepak Takraw here at the 2017 Southeast Asian Games. Only 4 Chinlone events competed by men were held.

== Participating nations ==
- Brunei
- Cambodia
- Indonesia
- Laos
- Malaysia
- Myanmar
- Philippines
- Thailand
- Vietnam

== Competition schedule ==
The following is the competition schedule for the sepak takraw competitions:

| RR | Round-robin | G | Group stage | ½ | Semifinals | F | Final |

Sepaktakraw
| Event↓/Date → | Fri 18 | Sat 19 | Sun 20 | Mon 21 | Tue 22 | | Wed 23 | Thu 24 | | Fri 25 | Sat 26 | Sun 27 | | Mon 28 | Tue 29 |
|---|---|---|---|---|---|---|---|---|---|---|---|---|---|---|---|
| Men's doubles | | | | | | | | | | RR | RR | RR | | | |
| Women's doubles | | | | | | | | | | G | G | ½ | F | | |
| Men's regu | | | | | | | | | | | | | | RR | RR |
| Women's regu | | | RR | RR | | | | | | | | | | | |
| Men's quadrant | | | | | | | G | G | ½ | F | | | | | |
| Women's quadrant | | | | | | | RR | RR | | RR | | | | | |
| Men's team doubles | | | G | G | ½ | F | | | | | | | | | |
| Men's team regu | RR | RR | | | | | | | | | | | | | |

Chinlone
| Event↓/Date → | Wed 16 | | Thu 17 | |
|---|---|---|---|---|
| Non-repetition primary | | | RR | F |
| Same stroke | RR | F | | |
| Linking | RR | F | | |
| Non-repetition secondary | | | RR | F |

== Medalists ==
=== Sepak takraw ===
| Event | Gold | Silver | Bronze |
|---|---|---|---|
| Men's doubles | Myanmar (MYA); Aung Myo Swe; Thant Zin Oo; Zaw Zaw Aung | Malaysia (MAS); Muhammad Kamal Ishak; Muhamad Suhairi Sulaiman; Muhammad Afifuddin Razali | Laos (LAO); Noum Souvannalith; Daovy; Chakkaphanh Khounlasouth |
| Men's doubles | Myanmar (MYA); Aung Myo Swe; Thant Zin Oo; Zaw Zaw Aung | Malaysia (MAS); Muhammad Kamal Ishak; Muhamad Suhairi Sulaiman; Muhammad Afifuddin Razali | Philippines (PHI); Jason Huerte; Ortouste Rheyjey Cabogoy; Mark Joseph Gonzales |
| Women's doubles | Thailand (THA); Somruedee Pruepruk; Masaya Duangsri; Nisa Thanaattawut | Vietnam (VIE); Hoàng Thị Hoa; Nguyễn Thị Quyên; Nguyễn Thị Mỹ | Malaysia (MAS); Kamisah Khamis; Nor Farhana Ismail; Nurrashidah Abdul Rashid |
| Women's doubles | Thailand (THA); Somruedee Pruepruk; Masaya Duangsri; Nisa Thanaattawut | Vietnam (VIE); Hoàng Thị Hoa; Nguyễn Thị Quyên; Nguyễn Thị Mỹ | Myanmar (MYA); Phyu Phyu Than; Khin Hnin Wai; Kyu Kyu Thin |
| Men's regu | Malaysia (MAS); Farhan Adam; Mohammad Syahir Rosdi; Mohd Hanafiah Dollah; Mohd Khairol Zaman Hamir Akhbar; Muhammad Hairul Hazizi Haidzir | Philippines (PHI); Jason Huerte; Mark Joseph Gonzales; Ortouste Rheyjey Cabogoy; Rhemwil Catana; Ronsited Gabayeron | Brunei (BRU); Mohammad Hafizzuddin Jamaludin; Mohammad Selamat Yakup; Mohammad Shahrine Bubin; Mohd Alliffuddin Jamaludin; Muhamad Basyiruddin Haji Kamis |
| Men's regu | Malaysia (MAS); Farhan Adam; Mohammad Syahir Rosdi; Mohd Hanafiah Dollah; Mohd Khairol Zaman Hamir Akhbar; Muhammad Hairul Hazizi Haidzir | Philippines (PHI); Jason Huerte; Mark Joseph Gonzales; Ortouste Rheyjey Cabogoy; Rhemwil Catana; Ronsited Gabayeron | Laos (LAO); Sengvanh Boulommavong; Daovy; Chakkaphanh Khounlasouth; Noum Souvannalith; Sonephet Xaiyaseng |
| Women's regu | Thailand (THA); Fueangfa Praphatsarang; Sasiwimol Janthasit; Sudaporn Palang; Thidarat Soda; Wiphada Chitphuan | Malaysia (MAS); Nor Farhana Ismail; Nurrashidah Abdul Rashid; Nurul Izzatul Hikmah Zulkifli; Siti Nor Suhaida Jafri; Siti Norzubaidah Che Ab Wahab | Philippines (PHI); Kristel Carloman; Lhaina Lhiell Mangubat; Mary Ann Lopez; Rizzalyn Amolacion; Jean Marie Sucalit |
| Women's regu | Thailand (THA); Fueangfa Praphatsarang; Sasiwimol Janthasit; Sudaporn Palang; Thidarat Soda; Wiphada Chitphuan | Malaysia (MAS); Nor Farhana Ismail; Nurrashidah Abdul Rashid; Nurul Izzatul Hikmah Zulkifli; Siti Nor Suhaida Jafri; Siti Norzubaidah Che Ab Wahab | Indonesia (INA); Dini Mita Sari; Evana Rahmawati; Florensia Cristy; Lena; Leni |
| Men's quadrant | Thailand (THA); Anuwat Chaichana; Pornchai Kaokaew; Rachan Viphan; Seksan Tubtong; Sittipong Khamchan; Wichan Temkort | Myanmar (MYA); Aung Myo Swe; Aung Pyae Tun; Aung Thu Min; Thant Zin Oo; Zin Ko Ko; Zin Min Oo | Indonesia (INA); Abdul Halim S. Radjiu; Hendra Pago; Herson Mohamad; Nofrizal; Saiful Rijal; Syamsul Hadi |
| Men's quadrant | Thailand (THA); Anuwat Chaichana; Pornchai Kaokaew; Rachan Viphan; Seksan Tubtong; Sittipong Khamchan; Wichan Temkort | Myanmar (MYA); Aung Myo Swe; Aung Pyae Tun; Aung Thu Min; Thant Zin Oo; Zin Ko Ko; Zin Min Oo | Malaysia (MAS); Ahmad Aizat Nor Azmi; Amirul Zazwan Amir; Mohammad Kamal Aizzat Azmi; Muhamad Suhairi Sulaiman; Muhammad Afifuddin Mohd Razali; Zuleffendi Sumari |
| Women's quadrant | Myanmar (MYA); Kay Zin Htut; Khin Hnin Wai; Kyu Kyu Thin; Nan Su Myat San; Nant Yin Yin Myint; Thin Zar Soe Nyunt | Indonesia (INA); Dini Mita Sari; Evana Rahmawati; Florensia Cristy; Lena; Leni; Sutini Seni | Vietnam (VIE); Dương Thị Xuyến; Giáp Thị Hiền; Nguyễn Thị Phương Trinh; Nguyễn Thị Quyên; Phạm Thị Hằng; Trần Thị Thu Hoài |
| Women's quadrant | Myanmar (MYA); Kay Zin Htut; Khin Hnin Wai; Kyu Kyu Thin; Nan Su Myat San; Nant Yin Yin Myint; Thin Zar Soe Nyunt | Indonesia (INA); Dini Mita Sari; Evana Rahmawati; Florensia Cristy; Lena; Leni; Sutini Seni | Laos (LAO); Chiep Banxavang; Santisouk Chandala; Falida Duangmala; Sonesavan Keosouliya; Nouandam Volabouth; Norkham Vongxay |
| Men's team doubles | Thailand (THA); Assadin Wongyota; Jirasak Pakbuangoen; Jutawat Srithong; Pornchai Kaokaew; Rachan Viphan; Seksan Tubtong; Suriyon Koonpimon; Treepong Rawangpai; Wichan Temkort | Myanmar (MYA); Aung Myo Naing; Aung Myo Swe; Aung Pyae Tun; Htet Myat Thu; Thant Zin Oo; Wai Lin Aung; Zaw Zaw Aung; Zin Ko Ko; Zin Min Oo | Malaysia (MAS); Ahmad Aizat Nor Azmi; Aidil Aiman Azwawi; Amirul Zazwan Amir; Muhamad Suhairi Sulaiman; Muhammad Afifuddin Razali; Muhammad Kamal Ishak; Norshahrudin Md Ghani; Wan Muhd Anas Muhaimi Asri; Zuleffendi Sumari |
| Men's team doubles | Thailand (THA); Assadin Wongyota; Jirasak Pakbuangoen; Jutawat Srithong; Pornchai Kaokaew; Rachan Viphan; Seksan Tubtong; Suriyon Koonpimon; Treepong Rawangpai; Wichan Temkort | Myanmar (MYA); Aung Myo Naing; Aung Myo Swe; Aung Pyae Tun; Htet Myat Thu; Thant Zin Oo; Wai Lin Aung; Zaw Zaw Aung; Zin Ko Ko; Zin Min Oo | Indonesia (INA); Abdul Halim S. Radjiu; Hendra Pago; Herson Mohamad; Nofrizal; Rezki Yusuf Djaina; Rizky Abdul Rahman Pago; Saiful Rijal; Syamsul Hadi; Victoria Eka Prasetyo |
| Men's team regu | Thailand (THA); Anuwat Chaichana; Assadin Wongyota; Jantarit Khukaeo; Jirasak Pakbuangoen; Kritsanapong Nontakote; Yupadee Pattarapong; Pornchai Kaokaew; Siriwat Sakha; Sittipong Khamchan; Somporn Jaisinghol; Thanawat Chumsena; Thawisak Thongsai | Indonesia (INA); Abdul Halim S. Radjiu; Hendra Pago; Herson Mohamad; Nofrizal; Rezki Yusuf Djaina; Rizky Abdul Rahman Pago; Saiful Rijal; Syamsul Hadi; Victoria Eka Prasetyo | Malaysia (MAS); Farhan Adam; Meor Mohamad Zulfikar Mat Amin; Mohamad Azlan Alias; Mohammad Syahir Rosdi; Mohd Hanafiah Dollah; Mohd Khairol Zaman Hamir Akhbar; Mohd Safarudin Abu Bakar; Mohd Syazreen Qamar Salehan; Muhamad Norhaffizi Abd Razak; Muhammad Hairul Hazizi Haidzir; Muhammad Zaim Razali; Said Ezwan Said De |
| Men's team regu | Thailand (THA); Anuwat Chaichana; Assadin Wongyota; Jantarit Khukaeo; Jirasak Pakbuangoen; Kritsanapong Nontakote; Yupadee Pattarapong; Pornchai Kaokaew; Siriwat Sakha; Sittipong Khamchan; Somporn Jaisinghol; Thanawat Chumsena; Thawisak Thongsai | Indonesia (INA); Abdul Halim S. Radjiu; Hendra Pago; Herson Mohamad; Nofrizal; Rezki Yusuf Djaina; Rizky Abdul Rahman Pago; Saiful Rijal; Syamsul Hadi; Victoria Eka Prasetyo | Brunei (BRU); Abdul Hadi Saidin; Abdul Mu'iz Nordin; Humaidi Brahim; Ismail Ang; Jamaludin Awang Haji Marzi; Mohammad Hafizzuddin Jamaludin; Mohammad Selamat Yakup; Mohammad Shahrine Bubin; Mohd Alliffuddin Jamaludin; Muhamad Basyiruddin Haji Kamis; Muhammad Azri Awang Abdul Harith; Nur Alimin Sungoh |

=== Chinlone ===
| Event | Gold | Silver | Bronze |
|---|---|---|---|
| Non-Repetition Primary | Thailand (THA); Apisit Chaichana; Dusit Piyawong; Eekkawee Ruenphara; Khanawut Rungrot; Komin Naonon; Noppadon Kongthawthong; Thongchai Sombatkerd; Witsarut Srisawat | Malaysia (MAS); Ab Muhaimi Che Bongsu; Izuan Affendi Azlan; Mohammad Kamal Aizzat Azmi; Mohd Zarlizan Zakaria; Muhammad Faiz Roslan; Muhammad Idham Sulaiman; Nur Hidayat Ar Rasyid Ahmad Daud; Putera Aidil Israfil Kamaruzaman | Cambodia (CAM); Cheat Khemrin; Chhorn Sokhom; Heng Rawut; Nang Sopheap; Riem Sokphirom; Sopheak Johnny; Troeng Ly; Ung Narith |
| Non-Repetition Primary | Thailand (THA); Apisit Chaichana; Dusit Piyawong; Eekkawee Ruenphara; Khanawut Rungrot; Komin Naonon; Noppadon Kongthawthong; Thongchai Sombatkerd; Witsarut Srisawat | Malaysia (MAS); Ab Muhaimi Che Bongsu; Izuan Affendi Azlan; Mohammad Kamal Aizzat Azmi; Mohd Zarlizan Zakaria; Muhammad Faiz Roslan; Muhammad Idham Sulaiman; Nur Hidayat Ar Rasyid Ahmad Daud; Putera Aidil Israfil Kamaruzaman | Brunei (BRU); Abdul Hadi Saidin; Abdul Mu'iz Nordin; Humaidi Brahim; Ismail Ang; Jamaludin Awang Haji Marzi; Mohammad Hafizzuddin Jamaludin; Muhamad Basyiruddin Haji Kamis; Muhammad Azri Awang Abdul Harith |
| Same Stroke | Myanmar (MYA); Kaung Myat Thiha; Khant Win Hein; Kyaw Soe Moe; Min Hsatt Paing; Myo Min Paing; Naing Aung; Sai Zaw Zaw; Wai Yan Phyoe | Thailand (THA); Apisit Chaichana; Dusit Piyawong; Eekkawee Ruenphara; Kamol Prasert; Khanawut Rungrot; Kittichai Khamsaenrach; Kittiwin Watawattana; Pongphan Obthom | Malaysia (MAS); Iskandar Zulkarnain Salim; Muhamad Asyraaf Abdul Hadi; Muhammad Azwan Muhrim; Muhammad Faiz Roslan; Muhammad Haiqal Damanhuri; Muhammad Shakirin Nasir; Nur Hidayat Ar Rasyid Ahmad Daud; Putera Aidil Israfil Kamaruzaman |
| Same Stroke | Myanmar (MYA); Kaung Myat Thiha; Khant Win Hein; Kyaw Soe Moe; Min Hsatt Paing; Myo Min Paing; Naing Aung; Sai Zaw Zaw; Wai Yan Phyoe | Thailand (THA); Apisit Chaichana; Dusit Piyawong; Eekkawee Ruenphara; Kamol Prasert; Khanawut Rungrot; Kittichai Khamsaenrach; Kittiwin Watawattana; Pongphan Obthom | Laos (LAO); Phitthasanh Bounpaseuth; Chanthalak Chanthavong; Adong Phoumisin; Saikham Saikham; Virayan Sombutphouthone; Yothin Sombutputhone; Anousone Soundala; Anousone Vilavongsa |
| Linking | Malaysia (MAS); Ab Muhaimi Che Bongsu; Iskandar Zulkarnain Salim; Izuan Affendi Azlan; Mohammad Kamal Aizzat Azmi; Mohd Nazuha Nazli; Muhamad Asyraaf Abdul Hadi; Muhammad Faiz Roslan; Putera Aidil Israfil Kamaruzaman | Philippines (PHI); Alvin Pangan; Emmanuel Escote; Joeart Jumawan; John Bobier; John Jeffery Morcillos; Regie Reznan Pabriga; Rhemwil Catana; Ronsited Gabayeron | Brunei (BRU); Abdul Hadi Saidin; Abdul Mu'iz Nordin; Humaidi Brahim; Ismail Ang; Jamaludin Awang Haji Marzi; Mohammad Hafizzuddin Jamaludin; Muhamad Basyiruddin Haji Kamis; Muhammad Azri Awang Abdul Harith |
| Non-Repetition Secondary | Myanmar (MYA); Kaung Myat Thiha; Khant Win Hein; Kyaw Soe Moe; Myo Min Paing; Naing Aung; Sai Zaw Zaw; Wai Yan Phyoe; Ya Wai Aung | Laos (LAO); Phitthasanh Bounpaseuth; Chanthalak Chanthavong; Adong Phoumisin; Saikham Saikham; Virayan Sombutphouthone; Yothin Sombutputhone; Anousone Soundala; Anousone Vilavongsa | Cambodia (CAM); Cheat Khemrin; Chhorn Sokhom; Heng Rawut; Nang Sopheap; Riem Sokphirom; Sopheak Johnny; Troeng Ly; Ung Narith |
| Non-Repetition Secondary | Myanmar (MYA); Kaung Myat Thiha; Khant Win Hein; Kyaw Soe Moe; Myo Min Paing; Naing Aung; Sai Zaw Zaw; Wai Yan Phyoe; Ya Wai Aung | Laos (LAO); Phitthasanh Bounpaseuth; Chanthalak Chanthavong; Adong Phoumisin; Saikham Saikham; Virayan Sombutphouthone; Yothin Sombutputhone; Anousone Soundala; Anousone Vilavongsa | Malaysia (MAS); Mohd Nazuha Nazli; Mohd Zarlizan Zakaria; Muhamad Asyraaf Abdul Hadi; Muhammad Haiqal Damanhuri; Muhammad Idham Sulaiman; Muhammad Noraizat Nordin; Nur Hidayat Ar Rasyid Ahmad Daud; Wan Muhammad Syazwan Asri |

== Medal table ==
* Host nation (Malaysia)

| Rank | Nation | Gold | Silver | Bronze | Total |
|---|---|---|---|---|---|
| 1 | Thailand (THA) | 6 | 1 | 0 | 7 |
| 2 | Myanmar (MYA) | 4 | 2 | 1 | 7 |
| 3 | Malaysia (MAS)* | 2 | 3 | 6 | 11 |
| 4 | Indonesia (INA) | 0 | 2 | 3 | 5 |
| 5 | Philippines (PHI) | 0 | 2 | 2 | 4 |
| 6 | Laos (LAO) | 0 | 1 | 4 | 5 |
| 7 | Vietnam (VIE) | 0 | 1 | 1 | 2 |
| 8 | Brunei (BRU) | 0 | 0 | 4 | 4 |
| 9 | Cambodia (CAM) | 0 | 0 | 2 | 2 |
| Totals (9 entries) | | 12 | 12 | 23 | 47 |
