= Cheyenne Goh =

Singaporean speed skater

Personal information
- Born: March 2, 1999 (age 27) Singapore

Sport
- Country: Singapore
- Sport: Short track speed skating
Medal record
Women's short track speed skating
Representing Singapore
Southeast Asian Games
Gold medal – first place	2019 Philippines	500 metres
Gold medal – first place	2019 Philippines	1,000 metres
Bronze medal – third place	2019 Philippines	3,000 metres relay
Silver medal – second place	2017 Kuala Lumpur	1,000 metres
Silver medal – second place	2017 Kuala Lumpur	3,000 metres relay
Bronze medal – third place	2017 Kuala Lumpur	500 metres

Cheyenne Goh
- Simplified Chinese: 吴琪雁
- Traditional Chinese: 吳琪雁
Transcriptions
Standard Mandarin
- Hanyu Pinyin: Wú Qíyàn
- IPA: [ǔ tɕʰǐ jɛ̂n]

Cheyenne Goh (Chinese: 吴琪雁; pinyin: Wú Qíyàn; Mandarin pronunciation: [ǔ tɕʰǐ jɛ̂n]; born March 2, 1999) is a Singaporean short track speed skater.

== Career ==
Goh achieved her highest rank in a World Cup event, by placing 18th in the 500m event in Calgary.

Goh became the first female short track speed skater from Singapore to compete at the World Championships.

Goh won three medals at the 2017 Southeast Asian Games in Kuala Lumpur, Malaysia. Goh took the bronze medal in the 500m event and silvers in the 1000m and 3000m relay events.

Goh became the first athlete representing Singapore to qualify for the Winter Olympics. Goh did this by being ranked in the top 36 in the 1,500 metres event over four world cups. She competed at the women's 1500m short track speed skating event at the 2018 Winter Olympics on 17 February 2018, where she did not advance out of the qualifiers.

== Personal bests ==
- 500m: 45.333
- 1000m: 1:36.674

== See also ==
- Singapore at the 2018 Winter Olympics
