= Pencak silat at the 2017 SEA Games =

Indonesian martial arts competition

- Venue: Kuala Lumpur Convention Centre
- Location: Kuala Lumpur, Malaysia
- Date: 24–29 August 2017

The pencak silat competitions at the 2017 SEA Games in Kuala Lumpur took place at Kuala Lumpur Convention Centre.

== Medal table ==
* Host nation (Malaysia)

| Rank | Nation | Gold | Silver | Bronze | Total |
|---|---|---|---|---|---|
| 1 | Malaysia* | 10 | 2 | 4 | 16 |
| 2 | Vietnam | 4 | 6 | 2 | 12 |
| 3 | Indonesia | 2 | 4 | 9 | 15 |
| 4 | Singapore | 2 | 4 | 6 | 12 |
| 5 | Thailand | 1 | 2 | 6 | 9 |
| 6 | Philippines | 1 | 0 | 4 | 5 |
| 7 | Brunei | 0 | 1 | 0 | 1 |
| 8 | Laos | 0 | 0 | 3 | 3 |
| Totals (8 entries) | | 20 | 19 | 34 | 73 |

== Medalists ==
=== Seni (artistic) ===
| Event | Gold | Silver | Bronze |
|---|---|---|---|
| Men's singles | Muhammad Afifi Nordin; Malaysia | Sugianto; Indonesia | Ilyas Sadara; Thailand |
| Women's singles | Nurzuhairah Yazid; Singapore | Norleyermah Haji Raya; Brunei | Puspa Arumsari; Indonesia |
| Men's doubles | Malaysia; Mohd Taqiyuddin Hamid; Rosli Sharif | Indonesia; Yolla Primadona Jampil; Hendy | Singapore; Nujaid Hasif Zainal Abidin; Muhammad Haziq Zainal Abidin |
| Women's doubles | Malaysia; Nor Hamizah Hassan; Nur Syazreen Malik | Singapore; Nur Azlyana Ismail; Nurhanishah Shahrudin | Indonesia; Ririn Rinasih; Riska Hermawan |
| Men's team | Indonesia; Anggi Faisal Mubarok; Asep Yuldan Sani; Nunu Nugraha | Malaysia; Mohd Faiz Abd Malek; Muhammad Syafiq Ibrahim; Sazzlan Yuga | Singapore; Hamillatu Arash Juffrie; Muhammad Haziq Zainal Abidin; Nujaid Hasif Zainal Abidin |
| Women's team | Vietnam; Nguyễn Thị Huyền; Nguyễn Thị Thúy; Nguyễn Thị Thu Hà | None (Note: Nurisan Loseng of Thailand failed a "B sample" doping test. She and her team mates As-ma Jeh-ma and Asma Wanchitnai were stripped of the gold medal. The Vietnamese team which originally won silver was awarded the gold medal.) | Indonesia; Gina Tri Lestari; Lutfi Nurhasanah; Pramudita Yuristya |

=== Tanding (match) ===
==== Men ====
| Event | Gold | Silver | Bronze |
|---|---|---|---|
| Class A 45–50 kg | Dines Dumaan; Philippines | Firman; Indonesia | Mastafa Fitri Masjuri; Malaysia |
| Class A 45–50 kg | Dines Dumaan; Philippines | Firman; Indonesia | Muhammad Ridhwan Selamat; Singapore |
| Class B 50–55 kg | Muhammad Faizul Nasir; Malaysia | Nguyễn Đình Tuấn; Vietnam | Galang Tri Widya Putra; Indonesia |
| Class B 50–55 kg | Muhammad Faizul Nasir; Malaysia | Nguyễn Đình Tuấn; Vietnam | Bo Thammavongsa; Laos |
| Class C 55–60 kg | Sobri Cheni; Thailand | Nguyễn Thái Linh; Vietnam | Hanifan Yudani Kusumah; Indonesia |
| Class C 55–60 kg | Sobri Cheni; Thailand | Nguyễn Thái Linh; Vietnam | Rick-Rod Ortega; Philippines |
| Class D 60–65 kg | Razak Ghazali; Malaysia | Pornteb Poolkaew; Thailand | Noukhit Latsaphao; Laos |
| Class D 60–65 kg | Razak Ghazali; Malaysia | Pornteb Poolkaew; Thailand | Jefferson Rhey Loon; Philippines |
| Class E 65–70 kg | Mohd Al Jufferi Jamari; Malaysia | Phạm Tuấn Anh; Vietnam | Kuibrohem Kubaha; Thailand |
| Class E 65–70 kg | Mohd Al Jufferi Jamari; Malaysia | Phạm Tuấn Anh; Vietnam | Mohammad Syahir Agus; Singapore |
| Class F 70–75 kg | Mohd Fauzi Khalid; Malaysia | Trần Đình Nam; Vietnam | Seksan Srimarn; Thailand |
| Class F 70–75 kg | Mohd Fauzi Khalid; Malaysia | Trần Đình Nam; Vietnam | Komang Harik Adi Putra; Indonesia |
| Class G 75–80 kg | Nguyễn Duy Tuyến; Vietnam | Muhd Nur Alfian Juma'en; Singapore | Mohamed Khusairy Azhar; Malaysia |
| Class G 75–80 kg | Nguyễn Duy Tuyến; Vietnam | Muhd Nur Alfian Juma'en; Singapore | Pimpirat Tonkhieo; Thailand |
| Class H 80–85 kg | Muhammad Robial Sobri; Malaysia | Lê Sĩ Kiên; Vietnam | Anton Yuspermana; Indonesia |
| Class H 80–85 kg | Muhammad Robial Sobri; Malaysia | Lê Sĩ Kiên; Vietnam | Surasak Deklee; Thailand |
| Class I 85–90 kg | Nguyễn Văn Trí; Vietnam | Muhammad Shakir Juanda; Singapore | Juryll del Rosario; Philippines |
| Class I 85–90 kg | Nguyễn Văn Trí; Vietnam | Muhammad Shakir Juanda; Singapore | Ahmad Badrirullah Rahmat; Malaysia |
| Class J 90–95 kg | Sheik Farhan Alau'ddin; Singapore | Mohd Khaizul Yaacob; Malaysia | Eko Febrianto; Indonesia |
| Class J 90–95 kg | Sheik Farhan Alau'ddin; Singapore | Mohd Khaizul Yaacob; Malaysia | Mã Văn Đạt; Vietnam |

==== Women ====
| Event | Gold | Silver | Bronze |
|---|---|---|---|
| Class A 45–50 kg | Phạm Thị Tươi; Vietnam | Atiq Syazwani Roslan; Singapore | Nurul Annisa Sobri; Malaysia |
| Class A 45–50 kg | Phạm Thị Tươi; Vietnam | Atiq Syazwani Roslan; Singapore | Princesslyn Enopia; Philippines |
| Class B 50–55 kg | Wewey Wita; Indonesia | Trần Thị Thêm; Vietnam | Nurul Shafiqah Saiful; Singapore |
| Class B 50–55 kg | Wewey Wita; Indonesia | Trần Thị Thêm; Vietnam | Suda Lueangaphichatkun; Thailand |
| Class D 60–65 kg | Siti Shazwana Ajak; Malaysia | Rewadee Damsri; Thailand | Sarah Tria Monita; Indonesia |
| Class D 60–65 kg | Siti Shazwana Ajak; Malaysia | Rewadee Damsri; Thailand | Nurul Suhaila; Singapore |
| Class E 65–70 kg | Siti Rahmah Nasir; Malaysia | Pipiet Kamelia; Indonesia | Nguyễn Thị Yến; Vietnam |
| Class E 65–70 kg | Siti Rahmah Nasir; Malaysia | Pipiet Kamelia; Indonesia | Paloy Barckkam; Laos |
