= Thailand at the 2017 SEA Games =

Thailand at the 2017 Southeast Asian Games
- IOC code: THA
- NOC: National Olympic Committee of Thailand
- Website: www.olympicthai.or.th/eng (in English and Thai)

in Malaysia 19 - 30 August 2017
- Competitors: 816 in 38 sports
- Flag bearer: Pornchai Kaokaew (sepak takraw)
- Officials: 444
- Medals Ranked 2nd: Gold 71 Silver 84 Bronze 88 Total 243

Southeast Asian Games appearances (overview)
- 1961; 1965; 1967; 1969; 1971; 1973; 1975; 1977; 1979; 1981; 1983; 1985; 1987; 1989; 1991; 1993; 1995; 1997; 1999; 2001; 2003; 2005; 2007; 2009; 2011; 2013; 2015; 2017; 2019; 2021; 2023; 2025; 2027; 2029

Thailand competed at the 2017 Southeast Asian Games in Malaysia from 19 to 30 August 2017.

== Competitors ==
Sport	Men	Women	Total
Diving	3	2	5
Swimming	13	14	27
Synchronised swimming	0	12	12
Water polo	13	13	26
Archery	8	8	16
Athletics	44	35	79
Badminton	10	10	20
Basketball	12	12	24
Billiards and snooker	6	2	8
Bowling	6	6	12
Boxing	6	0	6
Cricket	15	15	30
Cycling	23	9	32
Equestrian	12	10	22
Fencing	6	6	12
Football	20	20	40
Football	14	14	28
Golf	4	3	7
Gymnastics–Artistic	6	5	11
Gymnastics–Rhythmic	0	4	4
Field hockey	18	18	36
Indoor hockey	12	12	24
Ice hockey	20	0	20
Ice skating	6	6	12
Judo	3	3	6
Karate	8	6	14
Lawn bowls	10	10	20
Muay	5	0	5
Netball	0	12	12
Pencak silat	16	10	26
Pétanque	8	8	16
Rugby sevens	12	12	24
Sailing	12	10	22
Sepak takraw	30	8	38
Shooting	18	10	28
Squash	7	6	13
Table tennis	5	5	10
Taekwondo	6	6	12
Tennis	5	5	10
Triathlon	2	1	3
Volleyball	12	12	24
Waterski&Wakeboard	5	6	11
Weightlifting	5	0	0
Wushu	6	1	7
Total	449	367	816

== Medal summary ==
=== Medal by sport ===
Medals by sport
Sport	1st place, gold medalist(s)	2nd place, silver medalist(s)	3rd place, bronze medalist(s)	Total
Athletics	9	13	11	33
Taekwondo	6	1	1	8
Sepak takraw	6	1	–	7
Shooting	5	2	5	12
Sailing	4	6	4	14
Badminton	4	2	4	10
Tennis	4	2	3	9
Golf	3	2	1	6
Swimming	2	9	7	20
Cycling	2	7	6	15
Pétanque	2	4	1	7
Boxing	2	3	1	6
Muay	2	3	–	5
Pencak silat	1	2	6	9
Short track speed skating	2	1	–	3
Waterskiing	2	1	–	3
Futsal	2	–	–	2
Volleyball	2	–	–	2
Karate	1	5	5	11
Bowling	1	2	2	5
Billiards and snooker	1	2	1	4
Judo	1	2	1	4
Table tennis	1	1	4	6
Weightlifting	1	1	1	3
Football	1	1	–	2
Rugby sevens	1	–	1	2
Cricket	1	–	1	2
Indoor hockey	1	–	–	1
Water polo	1	–	–	1
Fencing	–	3	2	5
Equestrian	–	2	2	4
Gymnastics	–	1	7	8
Archery	–	1	1	2
Basketball	–	1	1	2
Field hockey	–	1	–	1
Ice hockey	–	1	–	1
Polo	–	1	–	1
Lawn bowls	–	–	4	4
Squash	–	–	2	2
Diving	–	–	2	2
Netball	–	–	1	1
Total	71	84	88	244

=== Medal by date ===
Medals by date
Day	Date	1st place, gold medalist(s)	2nd place, silver medalist(s)	3rd place, bronze medalist(s)	Total
–3	16 August	0	1	0	1
–2	17 August	1	0	0	1
–1	18 August	0	1	0	1
0	19 August	2	0	1	3
1	20 August	2	1	6	9
2	21 August	1	4	4	9
3	22 August	7	10	15	32
4	23 August	3	11	10	24
5	24 August	8	15	12	35
6	25 August	10	5	8	23
7	26 August	9	15	9	33
8	27 August	10	6	4	20
9	28 August	6	1	7	14
10	29 August	10	14	11	35
11	30 August	2	0	1	0
Total		71	84	88	244

=== Medalists ===
Medal	Name	Sport	Event	Date
Gold	Team: Apisit Chaichana; Dusit Piyawong; Eekkawee Ruenphara; Khanawut Rungrot; Komin Naonon; Noppadon Kongthawthong; Thongchai Sombatkerd; Witsarut Srisawat	Sepak takraw	Chinlone Event 1	17 August
Gold	Team: Alwani Sathitanon; Kaithip Saeteaw; Khemasiri Sirivejjabandh; Kornkarn Puengpongsakul; Varistha Saraikrarn; Nirawan Chompoopuen; Pranisa Nilklad; Pratchayaporn Nuch-Ong; Rojnaree Taweechai; Sarocha Rewrujirek; Sineenart Sonthipakdee; Thawanrat Wongpairoj; Thitirat Somyos	Water polo	Women's tournament	19 August
Gold	Team: Anuwat Chaichana; Assadin Wongyota; Jantarit Khukaeo; Jirasak Pakbuangoen; Kritsanapong Nontakote; Pattarapong Yupadee; Pornchai Kaokaew; Siriwat Sakha; Sittipong Khamchan; Somporn Jaisinghol; Thanawat Chumsena; Thawisak Thongsai	Sepak takraw	Men's team regu	19 August
Gold	Team: Suthasini Sawettabut; Padasak Tanviriyavechakul	Table tennis	Mixed doubles	20 August
Gold	Team: Butsaya Bunrak; Chitchanok Yusri; Jeeraporn Peerabunanon; Jutamas Butket; Naritsara Worakitsirikun; Piyamat Chomphumee; Rattanaporn Wittayaronnayut; Ruksina Navakaew; Thanachporn Wandee; Thanaporn Huankid; Tidarat Sawatnam; Uthumporn Liamrat	Rugby sevens	Women's tournament	20 August
Gold	Team: Fueangfa Praphatsarang; Sasiwimol Janthasit; Sudaporn Palang; Thidarat Soda; Wiphada Chitphuan	Sepak takraw	Women's regu	21 August
Gold	Natphanlert Auapinyakul	Shooting	Men's 50 m pistol	22 August
Gold	Supa Ngamphuengphit	Karate	Men's kumite Below 67kg	22 August
Gold	Team: Kamonchanok Klahan; Kanapan Pachatikapanya; Vanicha Chomtongdee	Sailing	Laser Radial Team Racing	22 August
Gold	Team: Assadin Wongyota; Jutawat Srithong; Jirasak Pakbuangoen; Pornchai Kaokaew; Rachan Viphan; Seksan Tubtong; Suriyon Koonpimon; Treepong Rawangpai; Wichan Temkort	Sepak takraw	Men's team Double	22 August
Gold	Nuttapong Ketin	Swimming	Men's 200m breaststroke	22 August
Gold	Promrob Juntima	Athletics	Men's shot put	22 August
Gold	Natta Nachan	Athletics	Women's javelin throw	22 August
Gold	Jiranunt Hathaichukiat	Shooting	Men's skeet	23 August
Gold	Team: Atchariya Cheng; Sithiphol Kunaksorn; Surasak Manuwong	Bowling	Tenpin Men's Trio	23 August
Gold	Team: Praprut Chaithanasakun; Thawat Sujaritthurakarn	Billiards and snooker	Men's English billiards doubles	23 August
Gold	Ratchadaporn Plengsaengthong	Shooting	Women's 50m rifle prone Individual	24 August
Gold	Navuti Liphongyu	Cycling	Road Men's individual Mass Start	24 August
Gold	Team: Savitree Amitrapai; Pattarasuda Chaiwan; Pornpawee Chochuwong; Nitchaon Jindapol; Chananchida Jucharoen; Jongkolphan Kititharakul; Busanan Ongbamrungphan; Rawinda Prajongjai; Puttita Supajirakul; Sapsiree Taerattanachai	Badminton	Women's team	24 August
Gold	Atthaya Thitikul	Golf	Women's individual	24 August
Gold	Kosuke Hamamoto	Golf	Men's individual	24 August
Gold	Chatchai Butdee	Boxing	Men's bantamweight	24 August
Gold	Wuttichai Masuk	Boxing	Men's light welterweight	24 August
Gold	Porranot Purahong	Athletics	Men's pole vault	24 August
Gold	Team: Anuwat Chaichana; Seksan Tubtong; Pornchai Kaokaew; Sittipong Khamchan; Rachan Viphan; Wichan Temkort	Sepak takraw	Men's quadrant	25 August
Gold	Team: Nicha Lertpitaksinchai; Peangtarn Plipuech	Tennis	Women's doubles	25 August
Gold	Peerachet Jantra	Athletics	Men's javelin throw	25 August
Gold	Team: Bandit Chuangchai; Kritsada Namsuwun; Jaran Sathoengram; Jirapong Meenapra	Athletics	Men's 4 × 100 m	25 August
Gold	Team: Sanchai Ratiwatana; Sonchat Ratiwatana	Tennis	Men's doubles	25 August
Gold	Team: Jesdaporn Tongsun; Kittiya Losantia; Ruenruedee Saubsing; Wibunsiri Phetpraphai; Benjamas Bureewan; Tikhamporn Sakunpithak; Kanya Jantapet; Chantree Ladawon; Thanaporn Tongkham; Sukanya Ritngam; Sairung Juwong; Praphatsorn Khamsaeng	Indoor hockey	Women's tournament	25 August
Gold	Phiangkhwan Pawapotako	Swimming	Women's 200m breaststroke	25 August
Gold	Chayanisa Chomchuendee	Athletics	Women's pole vault	25 August
Gold	Sunisa Khotseemueang	Athletics	Women's Heptathlon	25 August
Gold	Napis Tortungpanich	Shooting	Men's 50m rifle 3 positions Individual	25 August
Gold	Padiwat Jaemjan	Waterskiing	Men's individual	26 August
Gold	Luksika Kumkhum	Tennis	Women's Single	26 August
Gold	Yodchai Phachonyut	Shooting	Men's trap Individual	26 August
Gold	Team: Ornawee Srisahakit; Pongporn Suvittayarak	Taekwondo	Mixed Poomsae	26 August
Gold	Subenrat Insaeng	Athletics	Women's discus throw	26 August
Gold	Team: Nicha Lertpitaksinchai; Sanchai Ratiwatana	Tennis	Mixed doubles	26 August
Gold	Team: Samreang Sangsod; Thanakorn Sangkaew; Suksan Piachan; Thaloengkiat Phusa-at	Pétanque	Men's triples	26 August
Gold	Team: Atthaya Thitikul; Manuschaya Zeemakorn; Thitapa Pakdeesettakul	Golf	Women's team	26 August
Gold	Team: Kunanon Sukkaew; Jirayu Pleenaram; Nattapong Kongkraphan; Phitchaya Sunthonthuam	Athletics	Men's 4 × 400 m	26 August
Gold	Team: Sutida Poonpat; Gunyaporn Bueangbon	Sailing	Women's international 420 U19	27 August
Gold	Team: Apiwat Chaemcharoen; Chaivat Jamgrajang; Jetsada Chudech; Jirawat Sornwichian; Suphawut Thueanklang; Kanison Phoopan; Katawut Hankampa; Kritsada Wongkaeo; Muhammad Osamanmusa; Warut Wangsama-aeo; Nawin Rattanawongswas; Peerapol Satsue; Ronnachai Jungwongsuk; Sorasak Phoonjungreed	Futsal	Men's tournament	27 August
Gold	Team: Ariya Kritsawong; Darika Peanpailun; Hataichanok Tappakun; Jenjira Bubpha; Siranya Srimanee; Jiraprapa Nimrattanasing; Jiraprapa Tupsuri; Mutita Senkram; Nattamon Artkla; Teeratchada Boonpload; Pacharaporn Srimuang; Pannipa Kamolrat; Sasicha Phothiwong; Sawitree Mamyalee	Futsal	Women's tournament	27 August
Gold	Team: Somruedee Pruepruk; Masaya Duangsri; Nisa Thanaattawut	Sepak takraw	Women's double	27 August
Gold	Team: Tatsanai Kuakoonrat; Padiwat Jaemjan; Srirasin Khamklom; Akkarawin Paneesong; Alisa Earrilahaphand; Thidarat Limvuttegrijerat	Waterskiing	Team Overall wakeboarding	27 August
Gold	Team: Ajcharaporn Kongyot; Chatchu-on Moksri; Hattaya Bamrungsuk; Jarasporn Bundasak; Nootsara Tomkom; Pimpichaya Kokram; Piyanut Pannoy; Pleumjit Thinkaow; Pornpun Guedpard; Tapaphaipun Chaisri; Tichaya Boonlert; Wilavan Apinyapong	Volleyball	Women's tournament	27 August
Gold	Team: Anuchit Pakdeekaew; Chakkit Chandahuadong; Jirayu Raksakaew; Kantapat Koonmee; Kissada Nilsawai; Kitisak Saengsee; Kitsada Somkane; Kittikun Sriutthawong; Kittinon Namkhunthod; Mawin Maneewong; Montri Phuanglib; Saranchit Charoensuk	Volleyball	Men's tournament	27 August
Gold	Benjarat Yangtrakul	Taekwondo	Women's under 57kg	27 August
Gold	Masayuki Terada	Judo	Men's under 81kg	27 August
Gold	Jutatip Maneephan	Cycling	Women's omnium	27 August
Gold	Siripon Kaewduang-ngam	Sailing	Women's RS One Windsurfing	28 August
Gold	Team: Chanida Sutthiruang; Nannapat Khoncharoenkai; Naruemol Chaiwai; Nattaya Boochatham; Sornnarin Tippoch; Natthakan Chantham; Onnicha Kamchomphu; Ratanaporn Padunglerd; Rattana Sangsoma; Suleeporn Laomi; Rosenanee Kanoh; Sainammin Saenya; Sirintra Saengsakaorat; Soraya Lateh; Wongpaka Liengprasert	Cricket	Women's 20 tournament	28 August
Gold	Ramnarong Sawekwiharee	Taekwondo	Men's under 54kg	28 August
Gold	Julanan Khantikulanon	Taekwondo	Women's under 46kg	28 August
Gold	Team: Aumpawan Suwannaphruk; Sarawut Sriboonpeng	Pétanque	Mixed doubles	28 August
Gold	Natthaphong Phonoppharat	Sailing	Men's RS One Windsurfing	28 August
Gold	Team: Dechapol Puavaranukroh; Sapsiree Taerattanachai	Badminton	Mixed doubles	29 August
Gold	Sobri Cheni	Pencak silat	Tanding Men's Class C 55-60kg	29 August
Gold	Triphop Thongngam	Ice Skating	Men's 500m Short Track Speed Skating	29 August
Gold	Team: Kittinupong Kedren; Dechapol Puavaranukroh	Badminton	Men's doubles	29 August
Gold	Team: Jongkolphan Kititharakul; Rawinda Prajongjai	Badminton	Women's doubles	29 August
Gold	Mana Samchaiyaphum	Muay	Men's 63.5-67kg	29 August
Gold	Anueng Khatthamarasri	Muay	Men's 67-71kg	29 August
Gold	Tawin Hanprab	Taekwondo	Men's under 58kg	29 August
Gold	Panipak Wongpattanakit	Taekwondo	Women's under 49kg	29 August
Gold (DQ)	Team: As-ma Jeh-ma; Asma Wanchitnai; Nurisan Loseng	Pencak silat	Silat seni Women's regu	29 August
Gold	Team: Anusith Termmee; Sasalak Haiprakhon; Sasalak Haiprakhon; Worawut Namvech; Shinnaphat Lee-Oh; Chaowat Veerachat; Nattawut Sombatyotha; Nattawut Sombatyotha; Chenrop Samphaodi; Chaiyawat Buran; Kevin Deeromram; Peerawat Akkratum; Picha U-Tra; Montree Promsawat; Saringkan Promsupa; Phitiwat Sukjitthammakul; Ratthanakorn Maikami; Worachit Kanitsribampen; Sittichok Kannoo; Nont Muangngam	Footballs	Men's tournament	29 August
Gold	Pornchai Lapsi	Weightlifting	Men's 85 kg	30 August
Gold	Triphop Thongngam	Ice Skating	Men's 1000m Short Track Speed Skating	30 August
Silver	Team: Apisit Chaichana; Dusit Piyawong; Eekkawee Ruenphara; Kamol Prasert; Khanawut Rungrot; Kittichai Khamsaenrach; Kittiwin Watawattana; Pongphan Obthom	Sepak takraw	Chinlone Event 2	16 August
Silver	Peerapat Lertsathapornsuk	Swimming	Men's 10km open water	18 August
Silver (DQ)	Benjaporn Sriphanomthorn	Swimming	Women's 10km open water	18 August
Silver	Team: Kanapos Taytaisong; Kitikorn Nonbueng; Oraphin Phetlek; Prutirat Ratanakul Serireongrith; Warit Khuntaraporn; Wipawan Pawitayalarp	Equestrian	Team endurance	20 August
Silver	Team: Jenjira Srisa-ard; Patarawadee Kittiya; Natthanan Junkrajang; Kornkarnjana Sapianchai	Swimming	Women's 4 × 100 m freestyle relay	21 August
Silver	Team: Denchai Thepna; Natthapoom Phusawat; Witthaya Thamwong	Archery	Men's team recurve	21 August
Silver	Thanawut Sanikwathi	Cycling	Men's criterium	21 August
Silver	Voragun Srinualnad	Fencing	Men's sabre	21 August
Silver	Team: Navuti Liphongyu; Turakit Boonratanathanakorn; Phuchong Saiudomsin; Peerapol Chawchiangkwang	Cycling	Road Men's team time trial	22 August
Silver	Team: Arinadtha Chavatanont; Pakjira Thongpakdi; Princess Sirivannavari Nariratana; Chalermcharn Yotviriyapanit	Equestrian	Team dressage	22 August
Silver	Kiatkong Tanong	Pétanque	Men's singles	22 August
Silver	Uraiwan Hiranwong	Pétanque	Women's singles	22 August
Silver	Paweena Raksachart	Karate	Women's kumite Below 50kg	22 August
Silver	Team: Intira Panpiboon; Panwa Boonnak; Palika Poonpat; Saranwong Poonpat; Jedtavee Yongyuennarn	Sailing	Mixed Team racing optimist(U16)	22 August
Silver	Radomyos Matjiur	Swimming	Men's 200m breaststroke	22 August
Silver	Ammiga Himathongkom	Swimming	Women's 400m freestyle	22 August
Silver	Narong Benjaron	Athletics	Men's discus throw	22 August
Silver	Thawat Khachin	Athletics	Men's shot put	22 August
Silver	Kittipong Boonmawan	Athletics	Men's hammer throw	23 August
Silver	Team: Annop Arromsaranon; Erik Kim Bolleby; Yannaphon Larpapharat	Bowling	Tenpin Men's Trio	23 August
Silver	Panthawit Chamcharern	Fencing	Men's épée	23 August
Silver	Pornsawan Ngernrungruangroj	Fencing	Women's sabre	23 August
Silver	Kanokwan Kwanwong	Karate	Women's kumite Below 68kg	23 August
Silver	Theerapat Kangtong	Karate	Men's kumite Above 75kg	23 August
Silver	Arm Sukkiaw	Karate	Women's kumite Below 61kg	23 August
Silver	Team: Issara Kachaiwong; Phaitoon Phonbun	Billiards and snooker	Men's snooker doubles	23 August
Silver	Jenjira Srisa-ard	Swimming	Women's 50m butterfly	23 August
Silver (DQ)	Team: Ammiga Himathongkom; Patarawadee Kittiya; Benjaporn Sriphanomthorn; Natthanan Junkrajang	Swimming	Women's 4 × 200 m freestyle relay	23 August
Silver	Jirapong Meenapra	Athletics	Men's 200 metres	23 August
Silver	Sutthisak Singkhon	Athletics	Men's Decathlon	23 August
Silver	Supamas Wankaew	Shooting	Women's 50m rifle prone Individual	24 August
Silver	Yothin Yaprajan	Athletics	Men's 1,500m	24 August
Silver	Team: Piyabut Chamchoi; Sunchai Chueanchuea	Pétanque	Men's doubles	24 August
Silver	Mingkamon Koomphon	Athletics	Women's hammer throw	24 August
Silver	Patsapong Amsam-Ang	Athletics	Men's pole vault	24 August
Silver	Thitapa Pakdeesettakul	Golf	Women's individual	24 August
Silver	Thani Narinram	Boxing	Men's light flyweight	24 August
Silver	Tanes Ongjunta	Boxing	Men's flyweight	24 August
Silver	Pathomsak Kuttiya	Boxing	Men's middleweight	24 August
Silver	Team: Pichaiyuth Kanokvilaikul; Tanapon Romruen; Songvut Muntaen; Teerawat Pongsai; Supa Ngamphuengphit; Theerapat Kangtong	Karate	Men's team kumite	24 August
Silver	Team: Pataratida Meepak; Phantipha Wongchuvej	Pétanque	Women's doubles	24 August
Silver	Ammiga Himathongkom	Swimming	Women's 800m freestyle	24 August
Silver	Phitchaya Sunthonthuam	Athletics	Men's 400m	24 August
Silver	Team: Waraporn Boonsing; Natthakarn Chinwong; Duangnapa Sritala; Ainon Phancha; Pikul Khueanpet; Silawan Intamee; Naphat Seesraum; Warunee Phetwiset; Sunisa Srangthaisong; Alisa Rukpinij; Rattikan Thongsombut; Orathai Srimanee; Nipawan Panyosuk; Khwanrudi Saengchan; Taneekarn Dangda; Yada Sengyong; Pitsamai Sornsai; Kanjana Sungngoen; Nisa Romyen; Saowalak Pengngam	Footballs	Women's tournament	24 August
Silver	Team: Rakchai Sukwiboon; Tewin Chartsuwan; Arthit Thamwongsin; Panithi Nawasmittawong; Teerasak Rattanachot; Prakpoom Thongaram; Prawes Kaewjeen; Anun Kullugin; Chanchit Supadilokluk; Jantaphong Tengsakul; Chayutapon Kulrat; Chanokchon Limpinphet; Pattarapol Ungkulpattanasuk; Papan Thanakroekkiat; Masato Kitayama; Chanchieo Supadilokluk; Voravith Maklamthong; Hideki Nagayama; Phandaj Khuhakaew	Ice hockey	Men's tournament	24 August
Silver	Team: Luksika Kumkhum; Noppawan Lertcheewakarn	Tennis	Women's doubles	25 August
Silver	Team: Parichat Charoensuk; Supawan Thipat; Kanyarat Pakdee; Tassaporn Wannakit	Athletics	Women's 4 × 100 m	25 August
Silver	Yannaphon Larpapharat	Bowling	Tenpin Men's masters	25 August
Silver	Team: Phiangkhwan Pawapotako; Patarawadee Kittiya; Chavunooch Salubluek; Natthanan Junkrajang	Swimming	Women's 4 × 200 m Medley Relay	25 August
Silver	Areerat Intadis	Athletics	Women's shot put	25 August
Silver	Tatsanai Kuankoonrat	Waterskiing	Men's individual	26 August
Silver	Ratchadaporn Plengsaengthong	Shooting	Women's 50 m rifle 3 positions individual	26 August
Silver	Jirat Navasirisomboon	Tennis	Men's Single	26 August
Silver	Team: Katesara Kiatatchawachai; Ornawee Srisahakit; Phenkanya Phaisankiattikun	Taekwondo	Women's poomsae team	26 August
Silver	Team: Nanthana Komwong; Paranang Orawan; Suthasini Sawettabut; Jinnipa Sawettabut; Khetkuan Tamolwan	Table tennis	Women's team	26 August
Silver	Jamras Rittidet	Athletics	Men's 110 metres hurdles	26 August
Silver	Nonthakon Inkhokshong	Cycling	Men's BMX	26 August
Silver	Chutikan Kitwanitsathian	Cycling	Women's BMX	26 August
Silver	Team: Manatsanan Chaiteerapattarapong; Thanyaphat Sungvornyothin; Panjarat Prawatyotin; Pornchanit Junthabud	Gymnastics	Women's Rhythmics Team	26 August
Silver	Kornkarnjana Sapianchai	Swimming	Women's 100m butterfly	26 August
Silver	Natthanan Junkrajang	Swimming	Women's 200m freestyle	26 August
Silver	Team: Penphan Yothanan; Juthamas Jantakan; Juthathip Mathuros; Supira Klanbut; Suree Phromrat; Wipaporn Saechua; Supavadee Kunchuan; Suwimon Sangtad; Atchara Kaichaiyapoom; Naruemol Banmoo; Nutchavarin Buapa; Thidaporn Maihom	Basketball	Women's tournament	26 August
Silver	Team: Kammalas Namuangruk; Witchayanon Chothirunrungrueng; Kosuke Hamamoto; Sadom Kaewkanjana	Golf	Men's team	26 August
Silver	Team: Pornpan Hoemhuk; Treewadee Yongphan; Atchima Eng-Chuan; Supanich Poolkerd	Athletics	Women's 4 × 400 m	26 August
Silver	Orapin Senatham	Judo	Women's under 63kg	26 August
Silver	Team: Navee Thamsoontorn; Nut Butmarasri	Sailing	Men's international 470	27 August
Silver	Team: Suthon Yampinid; Nopporn Booncherd	Sailing	Men's international 420 U19	27 August
Silver	Turakit Boonratanathanakorn	Cycling	Men's scratch race	27 August
Silver	Surattana Thongsri	Judo	Women's under 70kg	27 August
Silver	Team: Pongthep Tapimay; Satjakul Sianglam; Worayut Kapunya	Cycling	Men's team sprint	27 August
Silver	Phaitoon Phonbun	Billiards and snooker	Men's snooker singles	27 August
Silver	Team: Alisa Narueangram; Praphatson Khuiklang; Jenjira Kijpakdee; Kanyanut Nakpolkrung; Sirikwan Wongkeaw; Onuma Doungsuda; Akamsiri Gasornjan; Khwanchanok Suksin; Jongjit Boonmee; Natthakarn Aunjai; Boonta Duangurai; Supansa Samanso; Thipvicha Jangiawechai; Anongnat Piresram; Kornkanok Sanpoung; Siraya Yimkrajang; Pornsuree Toemsombatbowon; Ornpanee Watcharoen	Field hockey	Women's tournament	28 August
Silver	Rewadee Damsri	Pencak silat	Tanding Women's Class D 60-65kg	29 August
Silver	Tairat Bunsuk	Weightlifting	Men's 69kg	29 August
Silver	Palika Poonpat	Sailing	Women's optimist U16	29 August
Silver	Pornteb Poolkaew	Pencak silat	Tanding Men's Class D 60-65kg	29 August
Silver	Panwa Boonnak	Sailing	Men's optimist U16	29 August
Silver	Vorravalan Leechinnaphat	Ice Skating	Women's 500m Short Track Speed Skating	29 August
Silver	Team: Puttita Supajirakul; Sapsiree Taerattanachai	Badminton	Women's doubles	29 August
Silver	Khosit Phetpradab	Badminton	Men's singles	29 August
Silver	Chonlawit Preedasak	Muay	Men's 60-63.5kg	29 August
Silver	Thachtana Luangphon	Muay	Men's 54-57kg	29 August
Silver	Surachai Nakthaem	Muay	Men's 51-54kg	29 August
Silver	Keerati Bualong	Sailing	Men's Laser standard	29 August
Silver	Team: Aiyawatt Srivaddhanaprabha; Nutthadith Sila-amornsak; Ploy Bhinsaeng; Apichet Srivaddhanaprabha; Satid Wongkraso; Nattapong Pratumlee; Thanasin Chuawangkham	Polo	Tournament	29 August
Silver	Team: Sarawut Sirironnachai; Navuti Liphongyu; Yuttana Mano; Turakit Boonratanathanakorn	Cycling	Men's team pursuit	29 August
Bronze	Natthaya Thanaronnawat	Athletics	Women's Marathon	19 August
Bronze	Warit Khuntaraporn	Equestrian	Individual endurance	20 August
Bronze	Witthaya Thamwong	Archery	Men's individual recurve	20 August
Bronze	Team: Akarin Thitisakulvit; Apichai Phichaikamol; Chatree Wannadit; Khomchak Chakrabandhu Na Ayudhaya; Klin Laksanasompong; Panupong Puangpun; Pattarapat Ganjanaget; Pitpong Plybua; Sumet Thammaporn; Tyler James Chant; Warongkorn Khamkoet; Wuttikorn Kaewkhiao	Rugby sevens	Men's tournament	20 August
Bronze	Team: Khanittha Kangwonngan; Paweena Kamwan; Pakladathanan Thiratananitiworachot; Bunwilai Thongma; Thidaporn Sutthachip; Panita Rittirong; Kliawked Panchutturat; Daraporn Panchang; Pacharee Sangjan; Preeyaporn Gulsiriratt; Sirima Samnaree; Rattiyakorn Buathong	Netball	Women's team	20 August
Bronze	Patarawadee Kittiya	Swimming	Women's 200 m butterfly	21 August
Bronze	Phiangkhwan Pawapotako	Swimming	Women's 100 m backstroke	21 August
Bronze	Sirawit Temmart	Shooting	Double trap	21 August
Bronze	Jutatip Maneephan	Cycling	Women's criterium	21 August
Bronze	Team: Jamorn Prommanee; Natthawat Lamaiwan; Natthawut Lamaiwan; Nattipong Aeadwong; Tikumporn Surintornta; Tissanupan Wichianpradit	Gymnastics	Team all-around	21 August
Bronze	Team: Padasak Tanviriyavechakul; Supanut Wisutmaythangkoon	Table tennis	Men's doubles	22 August
Bronze	Tikumporn Surintornta	Gymnastics	Men's Artistic Floor Exercise	22 August
Bronze	Jamorn Prommanee	Gymnastics	Artistic men's pommel horse	22 August
Bronze	Napis Tortungpanich	Shooting	Men's 10m air rifle	22 August
Bronze	Monsicha Tararattanakul	Karate	Women's kata individual	22 August
Bronze	Sopanut Mayakarn	Fencing	Men's foil	22 August
Bronze	Saowarot Samseemoung	Karate	Women's kumite Above 68kg	22 August
Bronze	Team: Annop Arromsaranon; Yanee Saebe	Bowling	Tenpin Mixed doubles	22 August
Bronze	Team: Keerati Bualong; Chusitt Punjamala; Jarupong Meeyusamsen	Sailing	Laser standard Team Racing	22 August
Bronze	Navaphat Wongcharoen	Swimming	Men's 200m butterfly	22 August
Bronze	Natthanan Junkrajang	Swimming	Women's 400m freestyle	22 August
Bronze	Nanthana Komwong	Table tennis	Women's singles	22 August
Bronze	Suthasini Sawettabut	Table tennis	Women's singles	22 August
Bronze	Padasak Tanviriyavechakul	Table tennis	Men's singles	22 August
Bronze	Jutamas Khonkham	Athletics	Women's 400m hurdle	22 August
Bronze	Kritsada Namsuwan	Athletics	Men's 100m	22 August
Bronze	Jamorn Prommanee	Gymnastics	Artistic Men's parallel bars	23 August
Bronze	Pornchai Sukhonpanich	Shooting	Men's 25m Rapid Fire Pistol	23 August
Bronze	Tanapat Jangpanic	Shooting	Men's skeet	23 August
Bronze	Tonpan Pokeaw	Fencing	Women's sabre	23 August
Bronze	Tippawan Khamsi	Karate	Women's kumite Below 55kg	23 August
Bronze	Siravit Sawangsri	Karate	Men's kumite Below 55kg	23 August
Bronze	Songvut Muntaen	Karate	Men's kumite Below 75kg	23 August
Bronze	Tanaphon Assawawongcharoen	Athletics	Women's 10,000m walk	23 August
Bronze	Parinya Chuaimaroeng	Athletics	Women's triple jump	23 August
Bronze	Pratchaya Tepparak	Athletics	Men's triple jump	23 August
Bronze	Team: Anuruk Rodmanee; Uthen Ontong; Chalit Yingyong; Patawee Montien	Lawn bowls	Men's fours	24 August
Bronze	Panwat Gimsrang	Athletics	Women's hammer throw	24 August
Bronze	Kammalas Namuangruk	Golf	Men's individual	24 August
Bronze	Team: Chamaipron Kotchawong; Patsorn Bryant; Kritsana Namthaisong; Palita Gangur	Lawn bowls	Women's fours	24 August
Bronze	Anavat Thongkrathok	Boxing	Men's light heavyweight	24 August
Bronze	Team: Suppanyu Avihingsanon; Bodin Isara; Kittinupong Kedren; Adulrach Namkul; Khosit Phetpradab; Nipitphon Phuangphuapet; Trawut Potieng; Dechapol Puavaranukroh; Kantaphon Wangcharoen; Nanthakarn Yordphaisong	Badminton	Men's team	24 August
Bronze	Team: Annop Arromsaranon; Surasak Manuwong; Erik Kim Bolleby; Yannaphon Larpapharat; Sithiphol Kunaksorn	Bowling	Men's team of five	24 August
Bronze	Team: Bunchuai Sombatraksa; Chanchai Pengkumta; Kamron Senamontree; Kiatiwut Suttisan; Vichanath Singh; Kittanu Sae Kue; Nikom Ma Yer; Nopphon Senamontree; Panasak Daenmalidoi; Wanchana Uisuk; Payuputh Sungnard; Sittipong Hongsi; Thanatit Jiraphanthawong; Thichakorn Chalasri; Werachai Maneerat	Cricket	Men's 50 over tournament	24 August
Bronze	Supanich Poolkerd	Athletics	Women's 400 metres	24 August
Bronze	Natthanan Junkrajang	Swimming	Women's 800m freestyle	24 August
Bronze	Team: Anantana Prasertratanakul; Tuddaw Thamronglarp	Squash	Women's jumbo doubles	24 August
Bronze	Team: Natthakit Jivasuwan; Phuwis Poonsiri	Squash	Men's jumbo doubles	24 August
Bronze	Team: Wattana Kadkhunthod; Anan Naksaray; Thanakrit Thammasarn	Lawn bowls	Men's triples	25 August
Bronze	Nawinda Kasemkiatthai	Shooting	Women's 10m air rifle	25 August
Bronze	Team: Kittipong Wachiramanowong; Wishaya Trongcharoenchaikul	Tennis	Men's doubles	25 August
Bronze	Praprut Chaithanasakun	Billiards and snooker	Men's English billiards singles	25 August
Bronze	Radomyos Matjiur	Swimming	Men's 100m breaststroke	25 August
Bronze	Sawitri Thongchao	Athletics	Women's shot put	25 August
Bronze	Sanchai Namkhet	Athletics	Men's 10,000m	25 August
Bronze	Wassana Winatho	Athletics	Women's Heptathlon	25 August
Bronze	Team: Naret Aiangetuen; Sonthi Manakitpaiboon	Lawn bowls	Men's pairs	26 August
Bronze	Team: Jarupon Limpichati; Siengsaw Lertratanachai; Korntawat Samran; Sailub Lertratanachai	Equestrian	Team jumping	26 August
Bronze	Wishaya Trongcharoenchaikul	Tennis	Men's Single	26 August
Bronze	Team: Naret Aiangetuen; Sonthi Manakitpaiboon	Diving	Mixed team event	26 August
Bronze	Team: Peangtarn Plipuech; Sonchat Ratiwatana	Tennis	Mixed doubles	26 August
Bronze	Team: Tyler Lamb; Sukhdave Ghogar; Chanatip Jakrawan; Darongpan Apiromvilaichai; Kannut Samerjai; Ratdech Kruatiwa; Bandit Lakhan; Chanachon Klahan; Nattakarn Muangboon; Patiphan Klahan; Teerawat Chanthachon; Chitchai Ananti	Basketball	Men's tournament	26 August
Bronze	Jenjira Srisa-ard	Swimming	Women's 50 m freestyle	26 August
Bronze	Team: Nantawan Fueangsanit; Thongsri Thamakord; Nattaya Yoothong; Patita Silawut	Pétanque	Women's triples	26 August
Bronze	Surasak Puntanam	Judo	Men's under 66kg	26 August
Bronze	Team: Narisara Satta; Nichapa Waiwai	Sailing	Women's international 470	27 August
Bronze	Thanawut Sanikwathi	Cycling	Men's scratch race	27 August
Bronze	Nutthawee Klompong	Taekwondo	Men's 68 kg	27 August
Bronze	Team: Chaniporn Batriya; Pannaray Rasee	Cycling	Women's team sprint	27 August
Bronze	Panjarat Prawatyotin	Gymnastics	Rhythmic Hoop Apparatus	28 August
Bronze	Thanyaphat Sungvornyothin	Gymnastics	Rhythmic Club Apparatus	28 August
Bronze	Panjarat Prawatyotin	Gymnastics	Rhythmic Ribbon Apparatus	28 August
Bronze	Witoon Mingmoon	Weightlifting	Men's 56kg	28 August
Bronze	Ilyas Sadara	Pencak silat	Silat seni Men's tunggal	28 August
Bronze	Jaturong Niwanti	Cycling	Men's sprint	28 August
Bronze	Sarawut Sirironnachai	Cycling	Men's pursuit	28 August
Bronze	Suda Lueangaphichatkun	Pencak silat	Tanding Women's Class B 50-55kg	29 August
Bronze	Team: Bodin Isara; Savitree Amitrapai	Badminton	Mixed doubles	29 August
Bronze	Kuibrohem Kubaha	Pencak silat	Tanding Men's Class E 65-70kg	29 August
Bronze	Pornpawee Chochuwong	Badminton	Women's singles	29 August
Bronze	Kanapan Pachatikapanya	Sailing	Women's Laser Radial	29 August
Bronze	Team: Bodin Isara; Nipitphon Phuangphuapet	Badminton	Men's doubles	29 August
Bronze	Apiwat Sringam	Sailing	Men's Laser Radial	29 August
Bronze	Surasak Deklee	Pencak silat	Tanding Men's Class H 80-85kg	29 August
Bronze	Seksan Srimarn	Pencak silat	Tanding Men's Class F 70-75kg	29 August
Bronze	Pimpirat Tonkhieo	Pencak silat	Tanding Men's Class G 75-80kg	29 August
Bronze	Watinee Luekajorn	Cycling	Women's keirin	29 August
Bronze	Team: Surincha Booranapol; Titiporn Tonapho	Diving	Women's synchronised 10 metre platform	30 August

=== Multiple medalists ===
Multiple medalists with at least 2 gold medals

Name	Sport	Gold	Silver	Bronze	Total
Pornchai Kaokaew	Sepak takraw	3	0	0	3
Sapsiree Taerattanachai	Badminton	2	1	0	3
Dechapol Puavaranukroh	Badminton	2	0	1	3
Jongkolphan Kititharakul	Badminton	2	0	0	2
Rawinda Prajongjai	Badminton	2	0	0	2
Atthaya Thitikul	Golf	2	0	0	2
Anuwat Chaichana	Sepak takraw	2	0	0	2
Rachan Viphan	Sepak takraw	2	0	0	2
Seksan Tubtong	Sepak takraw	2	0	0	2
Sittipong Khamchan	Sepak takraw	2	0	0	2
Wichan Temkort	Sepak takraw	2	0	0	2
Jirasak Pakbuangoen	Sepak takraw	2	0	0	2
Assadin Wongyota	Sepak takraw	2	0	0	2
Triphop Thongngam	Short track speed skating	2	0	0	2
Nicha Lertpitaksinchai	Tennis	2	0	0	2
Sanchai Ratiwatana	Tennis	2	0	0	2
Padiwat Jaemjan	Waterskiing	2	0	0	2
