= Badminton at the 2017 SEA Games – Individual event =

Tournament details
- Dates: 26–29 August
- Venue: Axiata Arena
- Location: Kuala Lumpur, Malaysia

Individual event for badminton at the 2017 SEA Games was held at the Axiata Arena, Kuala Lumpur from 26 to 29 August 2017.

== Men's singles ==
=== Seeds ===
1. (Indonesia) Jonatan Christie (Champion)
2. (Thailand) Khosit Phetpradab (Final)
3. (Indonesia) Ihsan Maulana Mustofa (Semifinals)
4. (Malaysia) Iskandar Zulkarnain Zainuddin (Quarterfinals)

=== Finals ===
Semifinals
1	Jonatan Christie (INA)	21	21
Nguyễn Tiến Minh (VIE)	11	16
3	Ihsan Maulana Mustofa (INA)	10	21
2	Khosit Phetpradab (THA)	21	23

Final
1	Jonatan Christie (INA)	21	21
2	Khosit Phetpradab (THA)	19	10

=== Top half ===
First Round
1	Jonatan Christie (INA)
BYE
Suppanyu Avihingsanon (THA)
BYE
Aung Myo Htoo (MYA)
BYE
Ryan Ng (SGP)
BYE
4	Iskandar Zulkarnain (MAS)
BYE
Cheng Phorrom (CAM)
BYE
Nguyễn Tiến Minh (VIE)
BYE
Vixunnalath Phichith (LAO)
BYE

Second Round
1	Jonatan Christie (INA)	14	21	21
Suppanyu Avihingsanon (THA)	21	8	17
Aung Myo Htoo (MYA)	16	17
Ryan Ng (SGP)	21	21
4	Iskandar Zulkarnain (MAS)	21	21
Cheng Phorrom (CAM)	11	6
Nguyễn Tiến Minh (VIE)	21	21
Vixunnalath Phichith (LAO)	11	7

Quarterfinals
1	Jonatan Christie (INA)	21	21
Ryan Ng (SGP)	13	13
4	Iskandar Zulkarnain (MAS)	21	17	18
Nguyễn Tiến Minh (VIE)	16	21	21

Semifinals
1	Jonatan Christie (INA)	21	21
Nguyễn Tiến Minh (VIE)	11	16

=== Bottom half ===
First Round
Loh Kean Yew (SGP)	21	21
Tep Chanmara (CAM)	11	14
BYE
Xaysomphone Vongpachith (LAO)
BYE
Lee Zii Jia (MAS)
BYE
3	Ihsan Maulana Mustofa (INA)
BYE
Phone Pyae Naing (MYA)
BYE
Jaspar Yu Woon Chai (BRU)
BYE
Phạm Cao Cường (VIE)
BYE
2	Khosit Phetpradab (THA)

Second Round
Loh Kean Yew (SGP)	21	21
Xaysomphone Vongpachith (LAO)	11	8
Lee Zii Jia (MAS)	7	17
3	Ihsan Maulana Mustofa (INA)	21	21
Phone Pyae Naing (MYA)	21	21
Jaspar Yu Woon Chai (BRU)	12	15
Phạm Cao Cường (VIE)	13	15
2	Khosit Phetpradab (THA)	21	21

Quarterfinals
Loh Kean Yew (SGP)	20	11
3	Ihsan Maulana Mustofa (INA)	22	21
Phone Pyae Naing (MYA)	8	4
2	Khosit Phetpradab (THA)	21	21

Semifinals
3	Ihsan Maulana Mustofa (INA)	10	21
2	Khosit Phetpradab (THA)	21	23

== Women's singles ==
=== Seeds ===
1. (Thailand) Busanan Ongbamrungphan (Quarterfinals)
2. (Indonesia) Fitriani (Quarterfinals)
3. (Thailand) Pornpawee Chochuwong (Semifinals)
4. (Malaysia) Soniia Cheah Su Ya (Final)

=== Finals ===
Semifinals
Gregoria Mariska Tunjung (INA)	20	13
4	Soniia Cheah Su Ya (MAS)	22	21
3	Pornpawee Chochuwong (THA)	9	21	18
Goh Jin Wei (MAS)	21	10	21

Final
4	Soniia Cheah Su Ya (MAS)	11	10
Goh Jin Wei (MAS)	21	21

=== Top half ===
First Round
1	Busanan Ongbamrungphan (THA)	21	21
Gone Yi Lin Khin (MYA)	14	9
Mimi Sixomxeuane (LAO)	4	10
Gregoria Mariska Tunjung (INA)	21	21
4	Soniia Cheah Su Ya (MAS)	21	22
Yeo Jia Min (SGP)	16	20
Ker Pechhoravy (CAM)	8	5
Nguyễn Thùy Linh (VIE)	21	21

Quarterfinals
1	Busanan Ongbamrungphan (THA)	21	20	17
Gregoria Mariska Tunjung (INA)	17	22	21
4	Soniia Cheah Su Ya (MAS)	21	13	21
Nguyễn Thùy Linh (VIE)	18	21	12

Semifinals
Gregoria Mariska Tunjung (INA)	20	13
4	Soniia Cheah Su Ya (MAS)	22	21

=== Bottom half ===
First Round
Onlyone Phouangmala (LAO)	7	5
Sarah Barredo (PHI)	21	21
Grace Chua (SGP)	11	10
3	Pornpawee Chochuwong (THA)	21	21
Goh Jin Wei (MAS)	21	21
Thet Htar Thuzar (MYA)	16	7
Lê Thu Huyền (VIE)	12	16
2	Fitriani (INA)	21	21

Quarterfinals
Sarah Barredo (PHI)	13	6
3	Pornpawee Chochuwong (THA)	21	21
Goh Jin Wei (MAS)	13	21	21
2	Fitriani (INA)	21	15	12

Semifinals
3	Pornpawee Chochuwong (THA)	9	21	18
Goh Jin Wei (MAS)	21	10	21

== Men's doubles ==
=== Seeds ===
1. (Thailand) Bodin Isara / Nipitphon Phuangphuapet (Semifinals)
2. (Indonesia) Fajar Alfian / Muhammad Rian Ardianto (Semifinals)
3. (Malaysia) Ong Yew Sin / Teo Ee Yi (Final)
4. (Thailand) Kittinupong Kedren / Dechapol Puavaranukroh (Champion)

=== Finals ===
Semifinals
1	Bodin Isara (THA); Nipitphon Phuangphuapet (THA)	12	15
3	Ong Yew Sin (MAS); Teo Ee Yi (MAS)	21	21
4	Kittinupong Kedren (THA); Dechapol Puavaranukroh (THA)	21	23
2	Fajar Alfian (INA); Muhammad Rian Ardianto (INA)	17	21

Final
3	Ong Yew Sin (MAS); Teo Ee Yi (MAS)	19	22	17
4	Kittinupong Kedren (THA); Dechapol Puavaranukroh (THA)	21	20	21

=== Top half ===
First Round
1	Bodin Isara (THA); Nipitphon Phuangphuapet (THA)
BYE
Terry Hee (SGP); Loh Kean Hean (SGP)
BYE
Aung Myo Htoo (MYA); Phone Pyae Naing (MYA)
BYE
Berry Angriawan (INA); Hardianto (INA)
BYE
3	Ong Yew Sin (MAS); Teo Ee Yi (MAS)
BYE
Tep Chanmara (CAM); Yan Kosal (CAM)
BYE
Soulisack Keopaserth (LAO); Vanhpasith Philavanh (LAO)
BYE
Anton Cayanan (PHI); Philip Joper Escueta (PHI)	21	21
Lê Đức Phát (VIE); Trần Quốc Việt (VIE)	13	7

Second Round
1	Bodin Isara (THA); Nipitphon Phuangphuapet (THA)	21	21
Terry Hee (SGP); Loh Kean Hean (SGP)	17	10
Aung Myo Htoo (MYA); Phone Pyae Naing (MYA)	6	14
Berry Angriawan (INA); Hardianto (INA)	21	21
3	Ong Yew Sin (MAS); Teo Ee Yi (MAS)	21	21
Tep Chanmara (CAM); Yan Kosal (CAM)	8	9
Soulisack Keopaserth (CAM); Vanhpasith Philavanh (CAM)	16	16
Anton Cayanan (PHI); Philip Joper Escueta (PHI)	21	21

Quarterfinals
1	Bodin Isara (THA); Nipitphon Phuangphuapet (THA)	21	18	21
Berry Angriawan (INA); Hardianto (INA)	18	21	14
3	Ong Yew Sin (MAS); Teo Ee Yi (MAS)	21	21
Anton Cayanan (PHI); Philip Joper Escueta (PHI)	12	6

Semifinals
1	Bodin Isara (THA); Nipitphon Phuangphuapet (THA)	12	15
3	Ong Yew Sin (MAS); Teo Ee Yi (MAS)	21	21

=== Bottom half ===
First Round
Namboun Luangamath (LAO); Sengrthit Sypaseuth (LAO)	14	21
Arkar Phone Myat (MYA); Hein Si Thu Toe (MYA)	21	23
BYE
Lee Jian Liang (SGP); Jason Wong (SGP)
BYE
Peter Gabriel Magnaye (PHI); Alvin Morada (PHI)
BYE
4	Kittinupong Kedren (THA); Dechapol Puavaranukroh (THA)
BYE
Goh Sze Fei (MAS); Nur Izzuddin (MAS)
BYE
Đỗ Tuấn Đức (VIE); Phạm Hồng Nam (VIE)
BYE
Leng Sopheaktra (CAM); Teav Yongvannak (CAM)
BYE
2	Fajar Alfian (INA); Muhammad Rian Ardianto (INA)

Second Round
Arkar Phone Myat (MYA); Hein Si Thu Toe (MYA)	14	19
Lee Jian Liang (SGP); Jason Wong (SGP)	21	21
Peter Gabriel Magnaye (PHI); Alvin Morada (PHI)	15	21	13
4	Kittinupong Kedren (THA); Dechapol Puavaranukroh (THA)	21	15	21
Goh Sze Fei (MAS); Nur Izzuddin (MAS)	21	21
Đỗ Tuấn Đức (VIE); Phạm Hồng Nam (VIE)	16	15
Leng Sopheaktra (CAM); Teav Yongvannak (CAM)	6	11
2	Fajar Alfian (INA); Muhammad Rian Ardianto (INA)	21	21

Quarterfinals
Lee Jian Liang (SGP); Jason Wong (SGP)	10	10
4	Kittinupong Kedren (THA); Dechapol Puavaranukroh (THA)	21	21
Goh Sze Fei (MAS); Nur Izzuddin (MAS)	10	14
2	Fajar Alfian (INA); Muhammad Rian Ardianto (INA)	21	21

Semifinals
4	Kittinupong Kedren (THA); Dechapol Puavaranukroh (THA)	21	23
2	Fajar Alfian (INA); Muhammad Rian Ardianto (INA)	17	21

== Women's doubles ==
=== Seeds ===
1. (Thailand) Puttita Supajirakul / Sapsiree Taerattanachai (Final)
2. (Malaysia) Vivian Hoo / Woon Khe Wei (Semifinals)

=== Finals ===
Semifinals
1	Puttita Supajirakul (THA); Sapsiree Taerattanachai (THA)	21	21
Đinh Thị Phương Hồng (VIE); Đỗ Thị Hoài (VIE)	12	5
Jongkolphan Kititharakul (THA); Rawinda Prajongjai (THA)	17	22	21
2	Vivian Hoo (MAS); Woon Khe Wei (MAS)	21	20	17

Final
1	Puttita Supajirakul (THA); Sapsiree Taerattanachai (THA)	16	8^{r}
Jongkolphan Kititharakul (THA); Rawinda Prajongjai (THA)	21	7

=== Top half ===
First Round
1	Puttita Supajirakul (THA); Sapsiree Taerattanachai (THA)
BYE
Dinar Dyah Ayustine (INA); Hanna Ramadini (INA)	15	19
Chow Mei Kuan (MAS); Lee Meng Yean (MAS)	21	21
Sarah Barredo (PHI); Alyssa Leonardo (PHI)	21	18	21
Grace Chua (SGP); Ker'sara Koh (SGP)	19	21	13
Nwe Nwe Aung (MYA); Su Win Aye (MYA)	14	14
Đinh Thị Phương Hồng (VIE); Đỗ Thị Hoài (VIE)	21	21

Quarterfinals
1	Puttita Supajirakul (THA); Sapsiree Taerattanachai (THA)	21	21
Chow Mei Kuan (MAS); Lee Meng Yean (MAS)	9	12
Sarah Barredo (PHI); Alyssa Leonardo (PHI)	11	10
Đinh Thị Phương Hồng (VIE); Đỗ Thị Hoài (VIE)	21	21

Semifinals
1	Puttita Supajirakul (THA); Sapsiree Taerattanachai (THA)	21	21
Đinh Thị Phương Hồng (VIE); Đỗ Thị Hoài (VIE)	12	5

=== Bottom half ===
First Round
Jongkolphan Kititharakul (THA); Rawinda Prajongjai (THA)	21	22
Greysia Polii (INA); Apriyani Rahayu (INA)	18	20
Gone Yi Lin Khin (MYA); Thwe Tar Oo (MYA)	14	8
Nguyễn Thị Sen (VIE); Lê Thu Huyền (VIE)	21	21
Bouphakesone Lomany (LAO); Onlyone Phouangmala (LAO)	9	16
Ren-ne Ong (SGP); Crystal Wong (SGP)	21	21
BYE
2	Vivian Hoo (MAS); Woon Khe Wei (MAS)

Quarterfinals
Jongkolphan Kititharakul (THA); Rawinda Prajongjai (THA)	21	21
Nguyễn Thị Sen (VIE); Lê Thu Huyền (VIE)	7	12
Ren-ne Ong (SGP); Crystal Wong (SGP)	12	10
2	Vivian Hoo (MAS); Woon Khe Wei (MAS)	21	21

Semifinals
Jongkolphan Kititharakul (THA); Rawinda Prajongjai (THA)	17	22	21
2	Vivian Hoo (MAS); Woon Khe Wei (MAS)	21	20	17

== Mixed doubles ==
=== Seeds ===
1. (Thailand) Dechapol Puavaranukroh / Sapsiree Taerattanachai (Champion)
2. (Malaysia) Goh Soon Huat / Shevon Jemie Lai (Final)
3. (Singapore) Terry Hee / Tan Wei Han (Quarterfinals)
4. (Thailand) Bodin Isara / Savitree Amitrapai (Semifinals)

=== Finals ===
Semifinals
1	Dechapol Puavaranukroh (THA); Sapsiree Taerattanachai (THA)	21	18	23
Chan Peng Soon (MAS); Cheah Yee See (MAS)	16	21	21
4	Bodin Isara (THA); Savitree Amitrapai (THA)	21	24	18
2	Goh Soon Huat (MAS); Shevon Jemie Lai (MAS)	18	26	21

Final
1	Dechapol Puavaranukroh (THA); Sapsiree Taerattanachai (THA)	21	22
2	Goh Soon Huat (MAS); Shevon Jemie Lai (MAS)	15	20

=== Top half ===
First Round
1	Dechapol Puavaranukroh (THA); Sapsiree Taerattanachai (THA)	21	21
Vanhpasith Philavanh (LAO); Mimi Sixomxeuane (LAO)	3	4
Alvin Morada (PHI); Alyssa Leonardo (PHI)	21	21
Chan Win Oo (MYA); Ei Ei Chaw (MYA)	10	7
3	Terry Hee (SGP); Tan Wei Han (SGP)	22	21
Đỗ Tuấn Đức (VIE); Phạm Như Thảo (VIE)	20	14
Edi Subaktiar (INA); Gloria Emanuelle Widjaja (INA)	5^{r}
Chan Peng Soon (MAS); Cheah Yee See (MAS)	8

Quarterfinals
1	Dechapol Puavaranukroh (THA); Sapsiree Taerattanachai (THA)	21	21
Alvin Morada (PHI); Alyssa Leonardo (PHI)	9	17
3	Terry Hee (SGP); Tan Wei Han (SGP)	21	19	16
Chan Peng Soon (MAS); Cheah Yee See (MAS)	16	21	21

Semifinals
1	Dechapol Puavaranukroh (THA); Sapsiree Taerattanachai (THA)	21	18	23
Chan Peng Soon (MAS); Cheah Yee See (MAS)	16	21	21

=== Bottom half ===
First Round
Hafiz Faizal (INA); Shella Devi Aulia (INA)	21	21
Phengsakoun Phonepadith (LAO); Bouphakesone Lomany (LAO)	8	8
Danny Bawa Chrisnanta (SGP); Crystal Wong (SGP)	15	10
4	Bodin Isara (THA); Savitree Amitrapai (THA)	21	21
Sai Wuu Phet (MYA); Thet Htar Thuzar (MYA)	20	20
Phạm Hồng Nam (VIE); Đinh Thị Phương Hồng (VIE)	22	22
Leng Sopheaktra (CAM); Ker Pechhoravy (CAM)	11	7
2	Goh Soon Huat (MAS); Shevon Jemie Lai (MAS)	21	21

Quarterfinals
Hafiz Faizal (INA); Shella Devi Aulia (INA)	12	15
4	Bodin Isara (THA); Savitree Amitrapai (THA)	21	21
Phạm Hồng Nam (VIE); Đinh Thị Phương Hồng (VIE)	11	15
2	Goh Soon Huat (MAS); Shevon Jemie Lai (MAS)	21	21

Semifinals
4	Bodin Isara (THA); Savitree Amitrapai (THA)	21	24	18
2	Goh Soon Huat (MAS); Shevon Jemie Lai (MAS)	18	26	21

== See also ==
- Men's team tournament
- Women's team tournament
