= Tennis at the 2017 SEA Games – Mixed doubles =

One of the game in southeast Asian games

Mixed doubles
- Tennis at the 2017 SEA Games

Final
- Champion: Nicha Lertpitaksinchai (THA); Sanchai Ratiwatana (THA)
- Runner-up: Jessy Rompies (INA); Christopher Rungkat (INA)
- Score: 6–1, 6–2

Events
Singles	men	women
Doubles	men	women	mixed
← 2015 ·	SEA Games	· 2019 →

Denise Dy and Treat Huey were the defending champions having won the event in 2015, but Huey chose not to participate

Nicha Lertpitaksinchai and Sanchai Ratiwatana won the gold medal, defeating Jessy Rompies and Christopher Rungkat in the final, 6–1, 6–2.

Peangtarn Plipuech and Sonchat Ratiwatana, and Dy and Ruben Gonzales won the bronze medals.

== Medalists ==
Event	Gold	Silver	Bronze
Mixed Doubles	Thailand (THA); Nicha Lertpitaksinchai; Sanchai Ratiwatana	Indonesia (INA); Jessy Rompies; Christopher Rungkat	Thailand (THA); Peangtarn Plipuech; Sonchat Ratiwatana
Mixed Doubles	Thailand (THA); Nicha Lertpitaksinchai; Sanchai Ratiwatana	Indonesia (INA); Jessy Rompies; Christopher Rungkat	Philippines (PHI); Denise Dy; Ruben Gonzales

== Seeds ==
1. Peangtarn Plipuech / Sonchat Ratiwatana (THA) (semifinals; Bronze Medallists)
2. Nicha Lertpitaksinchai / Sanchai Ratiwatana (THA) (champions; Gold Medallists)
3. Jessy Rompies / Christopher Rungkat (INA) (final; Silver Medallists)
4. Denise Dy / Ruben Gonzales (PHI) (semifinals; Bronze Medallists)

== Draw ==
=== Key ===
- Q = Qualifier
- WC = Wild card
- LL = Lucky loser
- Alt = Alternate
- ITF = ITF entry
- PR = Protected ranking
- SR = Special ranking
- SE = Special exempt
- JE = Junior exempt
- JR = Junior Accelerator Programme entrant
- CO = College Accelerator Programme entrant
- NG = Next Gen Accelerator Program entrant
- w/o = Walkover
- r = Retired
- d = Defaulted

First round
S Ho (CAM); S Our (CAM)	3	2
KNT Nguyễn (VIE); KQ Lê (VIE)	6	6
3	J Rompies (INA); C Rungkat (INA)	6	6
A Chua (MAS); CO Lee (MAS)	3	0
T Aung (MYA); TM Wai (MYA)	3	0
K Iglupas (PHI); A Lim (PHI)	6	6
T Selvarajoo (MAS); SMA Syed Naguib (MAS)	1	2
A Sutjiadi (INA); SW Trijati (INA)	6	6
S Hour (CAM); P Mam (CAM)	2	1
4	D Dy (PHI); R Gonzales (PHI)	6	6
TBT Phan (VIE); PV Nguyễn (VIE)	6	6
N Win (MYA); AK Naing (MYA)	0	0

Quarterfinals
1	P Plipuech (THA); So Ratiwatana (THA)	7	6
KNT Nguyễn (VIE); KQ Lê (VIE)	5	2
3	J Rompies (INA); C Rungkat (INA)	6	7^{11}
K Iglupas (PHI); A Lim (PHI)	2	6^{9}
A Sutjiadi (INA); SW Trijati (INA)	5	7^{7}	[9]
4	D Dy (PHI); R Gonzales (PHI)	7	6^{5}	[11]
TBT Phan (VIE); PV Nguyễn (VIE)	2	0
2	N Lertpitaksinchai (THA); Sa Ratiwatana (THA)	6	6

Semifinals
1	P Plipuech (THA); So Ratiwatana (THA)	2	7^{9}	[3]
3	J Rompies (INA); C Rungkat (INA)	6	6^{7}	[10]
4	D Dy (PHI); R Gonzales (PHI)	2	6^{6}
2	N Lertpitaksinchai (THA); Sa Ratiwatana (THA)	6	7^{8}

Final
3	J Rompies (INA); C Rungkat (INA)	1	2
2	N Lertpitaksinchai (THA); Sa Ratiwatana (THA)	6	6
