= Futsal at the 2017 SEA Games =

Tournament details
- Host country: Malaysia
- Dates: 18 – 27 August 2017
- Teams: 5 nations
- Venue: Panasonic Stadium

The futsal competitions at the 2017 SEA Games in Kuala Lumpur took place at Panasonic Stadium in Shah Alam.

The 2017 Games featured competitions in two events.

== Competition schedule ==
The following was the competition schedule for the futsal competitions:

RR	Round robin

Event	Fri 18	Sat 19	Sun 20	Mon 21	Tue 22	Wed 23	Thu 24	Fri 25	Sat 26	Sun 27
Men & Women	RR		RR		RR			RR		RR

== Participation ==
=== Participating nations ===
- Indonesia
- Malaysia
- Myanmar
- Thailand
- Vietnam

== Men's competition ==
Pos	Team	Pld	W	D	L	GF	GA	GD	Pts	Final Result
1	Thailand	4	3	0	1	20	10	+10	9	Gold medal
2	Malaysia (H)	4	2	1	1	14	9	+5	7	Silver medal
3	Vietnam	4	2	1	1	12	7	+5	7	Bronze medal
4	Indonesia	4	1	0	3	7	14	−7	3	
5	Myanmar	4	1	0	3	10	23	−13	3	

Source: KL2017 Official Website
(H) Hosts

== Women's competition ==
Pos	Team	Pld	W	D	L	GF	GA	GD	Pts	Final Result
1	Thailand	4	3	1	0	27	5	+22	10	Gold medal
2	Vietnam	4	2	1	1	8	6	+2	7	Silver medal
3	Indonesia	4	2	1	1	8	6	+2	7	Bronze medal
4	Malaysia (H)	4	1	1	2	4	16	−12	4	
5	Myanmar	4	0	0	4	5	19	−14	0	

Source: KL2017 Official Website
(H) Hosts

== Medal summary ==
=== Medal table ===
Host nation

Rank	Nation	Gold	Silver	Bronze	Total
1	Thailand (THA)	2	0	0	2
2	Vietnam (VIE)	0	1	1	2
3	Malaysia (MAS)*	0	1	0	1
4	Indonesia (INA)	0	0	1	1
Totals (4 entries)		2	2	2	6

=== Medalists ===
Event	Gold	Silver	Bronze
Men's tournament	Thailand (THA); Apiwat Chaemcharoen; Chaivat Jamgrajang; Jetsada Chudech; Jirawat Sornwichian; Kanison Phoopan; Katawut Hankampa; Kritsada Wongkaeo; Muhammad Osamanmusa; Nawin Rattanawongswas; Peerapol Satsue; Ronnachai Jungwongsuk; Sorasak Phoonjungreed; Suphawut Thueanklang; Warut Wangsama-aeo	Malaysia (MAS); Abu Haniffa Hasan; Akmarulnizam Idris; Mohamad Awalluddin Mat Nawi; Mohammad Shamsul Akmar Zamri; Mohd Azwann Ismail; Mohd Firdaus Razali; Mohd Khairul Effendy Bahrin; Mohd Ridzwan Bakri; Muhammad Awaluddin Hasan; Muhammad Azri Rahman; Muhammad Syafiq Hamzah; Saiful Aula Ahmad; Syed Aizad Daniel Nasir; Yazid Kamaruzuan	Vietnam (VIE); Lê Quốc Nam; Mai Thành Đạt; Ngô Đình Thuận; Ngô Ngọc Sơn; Nguyễn Đình Y Hòa; Nguyễn Mạnh Dũng; Nguyễn Minh Trí; Nguyễn Thành Tín; Nguyễn Văn Huy; Phạm Đức Hòa; Phùng Trọng Luân; Trần Thái Huy; Trần Văn Vũ; Vũ Xuân Du
Women's tournament	Thailand (THA); Ariya Kritsawong; Darika Peanpailun; Hataichanok Tappakun; Jenjira Bubpha; Jiraprapa Nimrattanasing; Jiraprapa Tupsuri; Mutita Senkram; Nattamon Artkla; Pacharaporn Srimuang; Pannipa Kamolrat; Sasicha Phothiwong; Sawitree Mamyalee; Siranya Srimanee; Teeratchada Boonpload	Vietnam (VIE); Đỗ Thị Nguyên; Lê Thị Thùy Linh; Ngô Nguyễn Thùy Linh; Nguyễn Thị Châu; Nguyễn Thị Hạnh; Nguyễn Thị Huế; Nguyễn Thị Thành; Phạm Thị Tươi; Phó Ngọc Thanh Thy; Thái Thị Thảo; Thái Thị Thu; Trịnh Ngọc Hoa; Trịnh Nguyễn Thanh Hằng; Truơng Kim Ngân	Indonesia (INA); Anggi Puspita Sari; Citra Adisti; Diah Tri Lestari; Dinar Kartika Sari; Diyana Herliana; Fitri Rosdiana; Fitriya Hilda; Maulina Novryliani; Maya Muharina Fajriah; Novita Murni Piranti; Rani Mulya Sari; Suciana Yuliana; Susi Susanti; Yunita Sari
