= Tennis at the 2017 SEA Games – Women's doubles =

Women's doubles
- Tennis at the 2017 SEA Games

Final
- Champion: Nicha Lertpitaksinchai (THA); Peangtarn Plipuech (THA)
- Runner-up: Luksika Kumkhum (THA); Noppawan Lertcheewakarn (THA)
- Score: 1–6, 6–3, [10–8]

Events
Singles	men	women
Doubles	men	women	mixed
- SEA Games

Noppawan Lertcheewakarn and Varatchaya Wongteanchai were the defending champions having won the event in 2015, but Wongteanchai chose to participate at the 2017 Summer Universiade instead.

Nicha Lertpitaksinchai and Peangtarn Plipuech won the gold medals, defeating Luksika Kumkhum and Lertcheewakarn in an all-Thai final, 1–6, 6–3, [10–8].

Jawairiah Noordin and Theiviya Selvarajoo of Malaysia, and Denise Dy and Katharina Lehnert of the Philippines won the bronze medals.

== Medalists ==
Event	Gold	Silver	Bronze
Women's Doubles	Thailand (THA); Nicha Lertpitaksinchai; Peangtarn Plipuech	Thailand (THA); Luksika Kumkhum; Noppawan Lertcheewakarn	Malaysia (MAS); Jawairiah Noordin; Theiviya Selvarajoo
Women's Doubles	Thailand (THA); Nicha Lertpitaksinchai; Peangtarn Plipuech	Thailand (THA); Luksika Kumkhum; Noppawan Lertcheewakarn	Philippines (PHI); Denise Dy; Katharina Lehnert

== Seeds ==
1. Nicha Lertpitaksinchai / Peangtarn Plipuech (THA) (champions; Gold Medallists)
2. Beatrice Gumulya / Jessy Rompies (INA) (quarterfinals)
3. Luksika Kumkhum / Noppawan Lertcheewakarn (THA) (final; Silver Medallists)
4. Jawairiah Noordin / Theiviya Selvarajoo (MAS) (semifinals; Bronze Medallists)

== Draw ==
Key

- Q = Qualifier
- WC = Wild card
- LL = Lucky loser
- Alt = Alternate
- ITF = ITF entry
- PR = Protected ranking
- SR = Special ranking
- SE = Special exempt
- JE = Junior exempt
- JR = Junior Accelerator Programme entrant
- CO = College Accelerator Programme entrant
- NG = Next Gen Accelerator Program entrant
- w/o = Walkover
- r = Retired
- d = Defaulted

First round
K Iglupas (PHI); AC Patrimonio (PHI)	2	4
D Nur Haliza (INA); A Sutjiadi (INA)	6	6
4	J Noordin (MAS); T Selvarajoo (MAS)	6	7^{7}
A Ka (CAM); C Som (CAM)	1	6^{3}
C Seah (SGP); S Tan (SGP)	2	6	[8]
KNT Nguyễn (VIE); NB Sĩ (VIE)	6	1	[10]
TBT Phan (VIE); TTT Trần (VIE)	6	6
U Nayar (MAS); SS Mohd Adam Das (MAS)	2	4
D Dy (PHI); K Lehnert (PHI)	6	6
S Ho (CAM); S Hour (CAM)	0	0

Quarterfinals
1	N Lertpitaksinchai (THA); P Plipuech (THA)	6	7
D Nur Haliza (INA); A Sutjiadi (INA)	1	5
4	J Noordin (MAS); T Selvarajoo (MAS)	6	6^{5}	[10]
KNT Nguyễn (VIE); NB Sĩ (VIE)	4	7^{7}	[7]
TBT Phan (VIE); TTT Trần (VIE)	1	0
3	L Kumkhum (THA); N Lertcheewakarn (THA)	6	6
D Dy (PHI); K Lehnert (PHI)	1	6	[10]
2	B Gumulya (INA); J Rompies (INA)	6	3	[7]

Semifinals
1	N Lertpitaksinchai (THA); P Plipuech (THA)	6	6
4	J Noordin (MAS); T Selvarajoo (MAS)	0	2
3	L Kumkhum (THA); N Lertcheewakarn (THA)	6	6
D Dy (PHI); K Lehnert (PHI)	4	3

Final
1	N Lertpitaksinchai (THA); P Plipuech (THA)	1	6	[10]
3	L Kumkhum (THA); N Lertcheewakarn (THA)	6	3	[8]
