= Tennis at the 2017 SEA Games – Men's doubles =

Men's doubles
- Tennis at the 2017 SEA Games

Final
- Champion: Sanchai Ratiwatana (THA); Sonchat Ratiwatana (THA)
- Runner-up: Francis Casey Alcantara (PHI); Ruben Gonzales (PHI)
- Score: 6–4, 2–6, [10–7]

Events
Singles	men	women
Doubles	men	women	mixed
- SEA Games

Sanchai and Sonchat Ratiwatana of Thailand were the defending champions and successfully defended their title, defeating Francis Casey Alcantara and Ruben Gonzales of the Philippines in the final, 6–4, 2–6, [10–7].

Lý Hoàng Nam and Nguyễn Hoàng Thiên of Vietnam, and Kittipong Wachiramanowong and Wishaya Trongcharoenchaikul of Thailand won the bronze medals.

== Medalists ==
Event	Gold	Silver	Bronze
Men's Doubles	Thailand (THA); Sanchai Ratiwatana; Sonchat Ratiwatana	Philippines (PHI); Francis Casey Alcantara; Ruben Gonzales	Vietnam (VIE); Lý Hoàng Nam; Nguyễn Hoàng Thiên
Men's Doubles	Thailand (THA); Sanchai Ratiwatana; Sonchat Ratiwatana	Philippines (PHI); Francis Casey Alcantara; Ruben Gonzales	Thailand (THA); Kittipong Wachiramanowong; Wishaya Trongcharoenchaikul

== Seeds ==
1. Sanchai Ratiwatana / Sonchat Ratiwatana (THA) (champions; Gold Medallists)
2. Francis Casey Alcantara / Ruben Gonzales (PHI) (final; Silver Medallists)
3. Kittipong Wachiramanowong / Wishaya Trongcharoenchaikul (THA) (semifinals; Bronze Medallists)
4. Lý Hoàng Nam / Nguyễn Hoàng Thiên (VIE) (semifinals; Bronze Medallists)
5. David Agung Susanto / Justin Barki (INA) (quarterfinals)
6. Aditya Sasongko / Sunu Wahyu Trijati (INA) (quarterfinals)
7. Ahmed Deedat Abdul Razak / Koay Hao-sheng (MAS) (quarterfinals)
8. Mohd Assri Merzuki / Syed Mohd Agil Syed Naguib (MAS) (quarterfinals)

== Draw ==
Key

- Q = Qualifier
- WC = Wild card
- LL = Lucky loser
- Alt = Alternate
- ITF = ITF entry
- PR = Protected ranking
- SR = Special ranking
- SE = Special exempt
- JE = Junior exempt
- JR = Junior Accelerator Programme entrant
- CO = College Accelerator Programme entrant
- NG = Next Gen Accelerator Program entrant
- w/o = Walkover
- r = Retired
- d = Defaulted

=== Finals ===
Semifinals
1	Sanchai Ratiwatana (THA); Sonchat Ratiwatana (THA)	6	6
4	Lý Hoàng Nam (VIE); Nguyễn Hoàng Thiên (VIE)	0	2
3	Kittipong Wachiramanowong (THA); Wishaya Trongcharoenchaikul (THA)	3	6^{11}
2	Francis Casey Alcantara (PHI); Ruben Gonzales (PHI)	6	7^{13}

Final
1	Sanchai Ratiwatana (THA); Sonchat Ratiwatana (THA)	6	2	[10]
2	Francis Casey Alcantara (PHI); Ruben Gonzales (PHI)	4	6	[7]

=== Top half ===
First round

Second round
1	Sa Ratiwatana (THA); So Ratiwatana (THA)	6	6
A Lim (PHI); J Patrombon (PHI)	4	1
S Alam (SIN); H-y Ng (SIN)	0	2
5	DA Susanto (INA); J Barki (INA)	6	6
4	NH Lý (VIE); TH Nguyễn (VIE)	6	6
V Rasavady (LAO); S Simmalavong (LAO)	3	0
K Bun (CAM); P Mam (CAM)	3	2
7	AD Abdul Razak (MAS); H-s Koay (MAS)	6	6

Quarterfinals
1	Sa Ratiwatana (THA); So Ratiwatana (THA)	6	4	[10]
5	DA Susanto (INA); J Barki (INA)	4	6	[2]
4	NH Lý (VIE); TH Nguyễn (VIE)	6	7
7	AD Abdul Razak (MAS); H-s Koay (MAS)	2	5

Semifinals
1	Sa Ratiwatana (THA); So Ratiwatana (THA)	6	6
4	NH Lý (VIE); TH Nguyễn (VIE)	0	2

=== Bottom half ===
First round
RA Hobbs (SIN); S Foo (SIN)	6	6
Chittakone (LAO); K Donedy (LAO)	3	0

Second round
8	MA Merzuki (MAS); SMA Syed Naguib (MAS)	7	6
RA Hobbs (SIN); S Foo (SIN)	5	3
KQ Lê (VIE); TM Phạm (VIE)	4	3
3	K Wachiramanowong (THA); W Trongcharoenchaikul (THA)	6	6
6	A Sasongko (INA); SW Trijati (INA)	6	6
S Long (CAM); S Our (CAM)	1	2
AM Thant (MYA); AT Oo (MYA)	0	1
2	FC Alcantara (PHI); R Gonzales (PHI)	6	6

Quarterfinals
8	MA Merzuki (MAS); SMA Syed Naguib (MAS)	2	6	[7]
3	K Wachiramanowong (THA); W Trongcharoenchaikul (THA)	6	3	[10]
6	A Sasongko (INA); SW Trijati (INA)	5	3
2	FC Alcantara (PHI); R Gonzales (PHI)	7	6

Semifinals
3	K Wachiramanowong (THA); W Trongcharoenchaikul (THA)	3	6^{11}
2	FC Alcantara (PHI); R Gonzales (PHI)	6	7^{13}
