= Badminton at the 2017 SEA Games – Men's team =

Badminton championships

Badminton – Men's team at the 2017 SEA Games
- Venue: Axiata Arena
- Dates: 22–24 August
- Nations: 8

Medalists
gold medal	Indonesia (INA)
silver medal	Malaysia (MAS)
bronze medal	Singapore (SGP)
bronze medal	Thailand (THA)

The badminton men's team tournament at the 2017 SEA Games in Kuala Lumpur was held from 22 to 24 August at the Axiata Arena, Kuala Lumpur, Malaysia.

== Schedule ==
All times are Malaysia Standard Time (UTC+08:00)

Date	Time	Event
Tuesday, 22 August	15:00	Quarter-final
Wednesday, 23 August	09:00	Semi-final
Thursday, 24 August	15:00	Gold medal match

== Results ==
Quarter-final
Indonesia (INA)	3
Cambodia (CAM)	0
Thailand (THA)	3
Vietnam (VIE)	0
Myanmar (MYA)	1
Singapore (SGP)	3
Laos (LAO)	0
Malaysia (MAS)	3

Semi-Final
Indonesia (INA)	3
Thailand (THA)	1
Singapore (SGP)	0
Malaysia (MAS)	3

Final
Indonesia (INA)	3
Malaysia (MAS)	0

=== Quarter-final ===
22 August	Indonesia (INA)	3–0	Cambodia (CAM)

Jonatan Christie	2–0	Tep Chanmara	21–13, 21–13
Ihsan Maulana Mustofa	2–0	Cheng Phorrom	21–5, 21–3
Firman Abdul Kholik	2–0	Leng Sopheaktra	21–5, 21–6

22 August	Thailand (THA)	3–0	Vietnam (VIE)

Khosit Phetpradab	2–0	Nguyễn Tiến Minh	21–8, 21–11
Kittinupong Kedren / Dechapol Puavaranukroh	2–0	Lê Đức Phát / Trần Quốc Việt	21–14, 21–12
Suppanyu Avihingsanon	2–0	Phạm Cao Cường	21–15, 21–19

22 August	Myanmar (MYA)	1–3	Singapore (SGP)

Phone Pyae Naing	0–2	Ryan Ng	13–21, 16–21
Chan Win Oo	0–2	Loh Kean Yew	12–21, 9–21
Aung Myo Htoo	2–0	Dominic Soh	26–24, 24–22
Phone Pyae Naing / Arkar Phone Myat	0–2	Terry Hee / Loh Kean Hean	11–21, 15–21

22 August	Laos (LAO)	0–3	Malaysia (MAS)

Vixunnalath Phichith	0–2	Iskandar Zulkarnain Zainuddin	7–21, 10–21
Namboun Luangamath / Sengrthit Sypaseuth	0–2	Ong Yew Sin / Teo Ee Yi	9–21, 5–21
Xaysomphone Vongpachith	0–2	Soong Joo Ven	10–21, 9–21

=== Semi-final ===
23 August	Indonesia (INA)	3–1	Thailand (THA)

Jonatan Christie	2–0	Khosit Phetpradab	21–6, 21–18
Fajar Alfian / Muhammad Rian Ardianto	1–2	Bodin Isara / Nipitphon Phuangphuapet	21–13, 15–21, 16–21
Ihsan Maulana Mustofa	2–0	Suppanyu Avihingsanon	21–15, 21–14
Berry Angriawan / Hardianto	2–0	Kittinupong Kedren / Dechapol Puavaranukroh	27–25, 21–9

23 August	Singapore (SGP)	0–3	Malaysia (MAS)

Ryan Ng	1–2	Iskandar Zulkarnain Zainuddin	21–19, 17–21, 10–21
Terry Hee / Loh Kean Hean	1–2	Ong Yew Sin / Teo Ee Yi	10–21, 22–20, 15–21
Loh Kean Yew	1–2	Lee Zii Jia	21–9, 17–21, 18–21

=== Final ===
24 August, 1500H UTC+08	Indonesia (INA)	3–0	Malaysia (MAS)

Jonatan Christie	2–0	Iskandar Zulkarnain Zainuddin	21–18, 21–17
Fajar Alfian / Muhammad Rian Ardianto	2–1	Ong Yew Sin / Teo Ee Yi	21–12, 16–21, 21–14
Ihsan Maulana Mustofa	2–0	Lee Zii Jia	21–11, 21–11

== See also ==
- Women's team tournament
- Individual event
