= Pétanque at the 2017 SEA Games =

- Venue: Pudu Ulu Recreational Park
- Location: Kuala Lumpur, Malaysia
- Date: 21–28 August 2017

The pétanque competitions at the 2017 SEA Games in Kuala Lumpur were held at Pudu Ulu Recreational Park.

== Medal table ==
* Host nation (Malaysia)

Rank	Nation	Gold	Silver	Bronze	Total
1	Thailand (THA)	2	4	1	7
2	Malaysia (MAS)*	2	1	3	6
3	Cambodia (CAM)	1	1	3	5
3	Laos (LAO)	1	1	3	5
5	Vietnam (VIE)	1	0	4	5
Totals (5 entries)		7	7	14	28

== Medalists ==
=== Men ===
Event	Gold	Silver	Bronze
Singles	Muhamad Hafizuddin Mat Daud; Malaysia	Kiatkong Tanong; Thailand	Sơn Khớp; Vietnam
Singles	Muhamad Hafizuddin Mat Daud; Malaysia	Kiatkong Tanong; Thailand	Sok Chanmean; Cambodia
Doubles	Malaysia (MAS); Saiful Bahri Musmin; Syed Akmal Fikri Syed Ali	Thailand (THA); Piyabut Chamchoi; Sunchai Chueanchuea	Laos (LAO); Phonepasert Soukkhaphon; Somsamay Xamounty
Doubles	Malaysia (MAS); Saiful Bahri Musmin; Syed Akmal Fikri Syed Ali	Thailand (THA); Piyabut Chamchoi; Sunchai Chueanchuea	Vietnam (VIE); Huỳnh Công Tâm; Nguyễn Văn Dũng
Triples	Thailand (THA); Samreang Sangsod; Suksan Piachan; Thaloengkiat Phusa-at; Thanakorn Sangkaew	Laos (LAO); Xay Boutdisipaseuth; Xokananh Fongsanouvong; Phoudthala Keokannika; Phetvaly Khalouy	Malaysia (MAS); Mohamad Hakem Saberi; Muhammad Syukri Kamaruddin; Mohd Safi Azrol Othman; Azfar Haris Mohd Aziz
Triples	Thailand (THA); Samreang Sangsod; Suksan Piachan; Thaloengkiat Phusa-at; Thanakorn Sangkaew	Laos (LAO); Xay Boutdisipaseuth; Xokananh Fongsanouvong; Phoudthala Keokannika; Phetvaly Khalouy	Cambodia (CAM); Heng Tha; Nhem Bora; Thong Chhoeun; Ya Chandararith

=== Women ===
Event	Gold	Silver	Bronze
Singles	Nguyễn Thị Thi; Vietnam	Uraiwan Hiranwong; Thailand	Suhartisera Zamri; Malaysia
Singles	Nguyễn Thị Thi; Vietnam	Uraiwan Hiranwong; Thailand	Un Sreya; Cambodia
Doubles	Cambodia (CAM); Ke Leng; Ouk Sreymom	Thailand (THA); Pataratida Meepak; Phantipha Wongchuvej	Vietnam (VIE); Lâm Thị Hồng Thu; Nguyễn Thị Loan
Doubles	Cambodia (CAM); Ke Leng; Ouk Sreymom	Thailand (THA); Pataratida Meepak; Phantipha Wongchuvej	Laos (LAO); Linda Keobolakoth; Phanthaly Phetsamone
Triples	Laos (LAO); Khoun Souksavat; Chansamone Vongsavath; Mimee Vongsavath; Chindavone Sisavath	Malaysia (MAS); Nurashimah Senin; Nur Farah Hana Musa; Nur Iman Aina Ahmad Sabti; Nurul Atiqah Abu Talib	Vietnam (VIE); Đào Thị Hồng Hiên; Nguyễn Thị Cẩm Duyên; Nguyễn Thị Thúy Kiều; Nguyễn Thị Trang
Triples	Laos (LAO); Khoun Souksavat; Chansamone Vongsavath; Mimee Vongsavath; Chindavone Sisavath	Malaysia (MAS); Nurashimah Senin; Nur Farah Hana Musa; Nur Iman Aina Ahmad Sabti; Nurul Atiqah Abu Talib	Thailand (THA); Nantawan Fueangsanit; Nattaya Yoothong; Patita Silawut; Thongsri Thamakord

=== Mixed ===
Event	Gold	Silver	Bronze
Doubles	Thailand (THA); Aumpawan Suwannaphruk; Sarawut Sriboonpeng	Cambodia (CAM); Duong Dina; Sao Sophearann	Malaysia (MAS); Anis Amira Basri; Mohd Nuzul Azwan Temizi
Doubles	Thailand (THA); Aumpawan Suwannaphruk; Sarawut Sriboonpeng	Cambodia (CAM); Duong Dina; Sao Sophearann	Laos (LAO); Manyvanh Souliya; Vansamay Neutsavath

== See also ==
- Boccia at the 2017 ASEAN Para Games
- Lawn bowls at the 2017 SEA Games
