= Boxing at the 2017 SEA Games – Results =

Boxing competitions

The boxing competitions at the 2017 SEA Games in Kuala Lumpur took place at the MATRADE Exhibition and Convention Centre in Segambut.

The 2017 Games featured competitions in six events (all events for men).

== Men's light flyweight ==
=== Finals ===
Semi-finals
Ngoc Tan Huynh (VIE) | 0
Thani Narimram (THA) | 1
Muhamad Fuad Redzuan (MAS) | 5
Bounpone Lasavanesy (LAO) | 0

Final
Thani Narimram (THA) | 0
Muhamad Fuad Redzuan (MAS) | 5

=== Top half ===
| Preliminary Round | | Semi-finals | | Final |
| | | Antoninho Dos Santos (TLS) | 0 |
| Ngoc Tan Huynh (VIE) | 1 | Ngoc Tan Huynh (VIE) | 5 |
| Sann Tola (CAM) | 0 | | | Ngoc Tan Huynh (VIE) | 0 |
| | | | | Thani Narimram (THA) | 1 |
| | | Thani Narimram (THA) | 3 |
| | | Kornelis Kwangu Langu (INA) | 3 |

=== Bottom half ===
| Preliminary Round | Semi-finals | | Final |
| | Muhamad Fuad Redzuan (MAS) | 5 |
| | Carlo Paalam (PHI) | 0 |
| | | | Muhammad Fuad Redzuan (MAS) | 5 |
| | | | Bounpone Lasavanesy (LAO) | 0 |
| | Bounpone Lasavanesy (LAO) | 4 |
| | Wai Phyo Tun (MYA) | 1 |

== Men's flyweight ==
Semi-finals
Ian Clark Bautista (PHI) | 1
Tanes Ongjunta (THA) | 2
Aldoms Suguro (INA) | 2
Mohamed Hanurdeen Hamid (SIN) | 1

Final
Tanes Ongjunta (THA)
Aldoms Suguro (INA)

=== Top half ===
| Quarterfinals | Semifinals |
| (Philippines) Ian Clark Bautista |
| (Malaysia) Abdul Salam Kasih | (Philippines) Ian Clark Bautista | 1 |
| (Thailand) Tanes Ongjunta | (Thailand) Tanes Ongjunta | 2 |
| (Cambodia) Hang Ramorn |

=== Bottom half ===
| Quarterfinals | Semifinals |
| (Indonesia) Aldoms Suguro |
| (Vietnam) Bui Trong Thai | (Indonesia) Aldoms Suguro | 2 |
| (Myanmar) Lin Htut Paing | (Singapore) Mohamed Hanurdeen Hamid | 1 |
| (Singapore) Mohamed Hanurdeen Hamid |

== Men's bantamweight ==
=== Finals ===
Semi-finals
Chatchai Butdee (THA) | 3
Vilaysack Chansamone (LAO) | 0
Mario Fernandez (PHI) | 3
Nak Siek Nin (CAM) | 1

Final
Chatchai Butdee (THA)
Mario Fernandez (PHI)

=== Top half ===
| Quarterfinals | Semifinals |
| (Thailand) Chatchai Butdee |
| (Indonesia) Simon Makerawe | (Thailand) Chatchai Butdee | 3 |
| (Laos) Chansamone Vilaysack | (Laos) Chansamone Vilaysack | 0 |
| (Timor-Leste) Teonisio Nobelino Da Paz Belo |

=== Bottom half ===
| Quarterfinals | | Semifinals |
| (Philippines) Mario Fernandez |
| (Vietnam) Tran Phu Cuong | | (Philippines) Mario Fernandez | 3 |
| (Cambodia) Nat Siek Nin | 3 | (Cambodia) Nat Siek Nin | 1 |
| (Singapore) Danial Abdul Jalil | 2 |

== Men's light welterweight ==
=== Finals ===
Semi-finals
Wuttichai Masuk (THA) | 3
Charly Suarez (PHI) | 2
Sarohatua Lumbantobing (INA) | 3
Leong Jun Hao (SIN) | 1

Final
Wuttichai Masuk (THA)
Sarohatua Lumbantobing (INA)

=== Top half ===
| Quarterfinals | Semifinals |
| (Thailand) Wuttichai Masuk |
| (Vietnam) Bui Phuoc Tung | (Thailand) Wuttichai Masuk | 3 |
| (Philippines) Charly Suarez | (Philippines) Charly Suarez | 2 |
| (Malaysia) Khir Akyazlan Bin Azmi |

=== Bottom half ===
| Quarterfinals | Semifinals |
| (Indonesia) Sarohatua Lumbantobing |
| (Myanmar) Aung Pyae Phyo | (Indonesia) Sarohatua Lumbantobing | 3 |
| (Singapore) Jun Hao Leong | (Singapore) Jun Hao Leong | 1 |
| (Laos) Oudone Khanxay |

== Men's middleweight ==
=== Finals ===
Semi-finals
Richard Oscar Laim (INA) | 0
Pathomsak Kuttiya (THA) | RSC R 2
Eumir Felix Marcial (PHI) | RSC R 2
Indran Rama Krishnan (MAS) | 0

Final
Pathomsak Kuttiya (THA)
Eumir Felix Marcial (PHI)

=== Top half ===
| Quarterfinals | Semifinals |
| (Indonesia) Richard Oscar Laim |
| (Laos) Khotsomba Kalanih | (Indonesia) Richard Oscar Laim |
| (Thailand) Pathomsak Kuttiya | (Thailand) Pathomsak Kuttiya | RSC R 2 |
| (Myanmar) Myo Kyaw Thu |

=== Bottom half ===
| Quarterfinals | Semifinals |
| (Philippines) Eumir Felix Marcial |
| (Vietnam) Nguyen Manh Cuong | (Philippines) Eumir Felix Marcial | RSC R 2 |
| (Malaysia) Indran Rama Krishnan | (Malaysia) Indran Rama Krishnan |
| (Timor-Leste) Henrique Borges Pereira |

== Men's light heavyweight ==
=== Finals ===
Semi-finals
Muhammad Dinie Hakeem Bin Abdul Rahman (SIN) | 1
Adli Hafid Mohd Pauzi (MAS) | 2
John Marvin (PHI) | 2
Anavat Thongkrathok (THA) | 1

Final
Adli Hafid Mohd Pauzi (MAS)
John Marvin (PHI) | RSC R1

=== Top half ===
| Quarterfinals | Semifinals |
| (Singapore) Muhammad Dinie Hakeem Bin Abdul Rahman |
| BYE | (Singapore) Muhammad Dinie Hakeem Bin Abdul Rahman | 1 |
| (Malaysia) Adli Hafidz Bin Mohamed Pauzi | (Malaysia) Adli Hafidz Bin Mohamed Pauzi | 2 |
| (Vietnam) Vo Van Que |

=== Bottom half ===
| Quarterfinals | Semifinals |
| (Philippines) John Marvin |
| (Cambodia) Felix Merlin Martinez | (Philippines) John Marvin | 2 |
| (Thailand) Avanat Thongkrathok | (Thailand) Avanat Thongkrathok | 1 |
| (Indonesia) Brama Hendra Betaubun |
