= Cycling at the 2017 SEA Games – Results =

The cycling competitions at the 2017 SEA Games in Kuala Lumpur takes place at Nilai and Putrajaya.

The 2017 Games featured competitions in twenty events (men 12 events and women 8 events).\

== Men's BMX ==
Men's BMX at the 2017 SEA Games
- Venue: TBA
- Date: August 2017

=== Seeding run ===
Rank	Name	Time	Notes
1			

=== Semi-finals ===
==== Heat 1 ====
Rank	Name	1st run	2nd run	3rd run	Total	Notes
1						Q
2						

==== Heat 2 ====
Rank	Name	1st run	2nd run	3rd run	Total	Notes
1						Q
2						

=== Final ===
Rank	Name	Time
1st place, gold medalist(s)		
2nd place, silver medalist(s)		
3rd place, bronze medalist(s)		

== Women's BMX ==
Women's BMX at the 2017 SEA Games
- Venue: TBA
- Date: August 2017

=== Seeding run ===
Rank	Name	Time	Notes
1			

=== Semi-finals ===
==== Heat 1 ====
Rank	Name	1st run	2nd run	3rd run	Total	Notes
1						Q
2						

==== Heat 2 ====
Rank	Name	1st run	2nd run	3rd run	Total	Notes
1						Q
2						

=== Final ===
Rank	Name	Time
1st place, gold medalist(s)		
2nd place, silver medalist(s)		
3rd place, bronze medalist(s)		

== Men's criterium ==
Men's criterium at the 2017 SEA Games
- Venue: Dataran Putrajaya, Presint 3 Putrajaya
- Date: August 2017

Medalists
gold medal	Mohd Harrif Saleh	Malaysia
silver medal	Thanawut Sanikwathi	Thailand
bronze medal	Mohd Zamri Saleh	Malaysia

=== Final ===
Rank	Name	Time
1st place, gold medalist(s)	Mohd Harrif Saleh (MAS)	59:35
2nd place, silver medalist(s)	Thanawut Sanikwathi (THA)	59:35
3rd place, bronze medalist(s)	Mohd Zamri Saleh (MAS)	59:35

== Women's criterium ==
Women's criterium at the 2017 SEA Games
- Venue: Dataran Putrajaya, Presint 3 Putrajaya
- Date: August 2017
- Competitors: 13 from 7 nations

Medalists
gold medal	Nguyễn Thị Thật	Vietnam
silver medal	Jupha Somnet	Malaysia
bronze medal	Jutatip Maneephan	Thailand

=== Final ===
Rank	Name	Time
1st place, gold medalist(s)	Nguyễn Thị Thật (VIE)	1:02:09
2nd place, silver medalist(s)	Jupha Somnet (MAS)	1:02:09
3rd place, bronze medalist(s)	Jutatip Maneephan (THA)	1:02:09
4	Marella Vania Salamat (PHI)	1:02:09
5	Ayustina Delia Priatna (INA)	1:02:09
6	Heng Sivlang (CAM)	1:02:09
7	Serene Lee Jer Ling (SGP)	1:02:09
8	Nur Aisyah Zubir (MAS)	1:02:09
9	Luo Yiwei (SGP)	1:02:09
10	Maghfirotika Marenda (INA)	1:02:09
11	Nguyễn Thị Thị (VIE)	1:02:09
12	Heng Siv Guek (CAM)	1:02:18
13	Supuksorn Nuntana (THA)	1:02:23

== Men's team road time trial ==
Men's team road time trial at the 2017 SEA Games
- Venue: TBA
- Date: August 2017

=== Final ===
Rank	Name	Time
1st place, gold medalist(s)		
2nd place, silver medalist(s)		
3rd place, bronze medalist(s)		

== Men's road race ==
Men's road race at the 2017 SEA Games
- Venue: TBA
- Date: August 2017

=== Final ===
Rank	Name	Time
1st place, gold medalist(s)		
Did not finish
		DNF
Disqualified
		DSQ

== Women's road race ==
Women's road race at the 2017 SEA Games
- Venue: TBA
- Date: August 2017

=== Final ===
Rank	Name	Time
1st place, gold medalist(s)		
2nd place, silver medalist(s)		
3rd place, bronze medalist(s)		
Did not finish
		DNF
Disqualified
		DSQ

== Men's Keirin ==
Men's Keirin at the 2017 SEA Games
- Venue: Velodrom Nasional Malaysia
- Date: 29 August 2017
- Competitors: 8 from 5 nations

Medalists
gold medal	Azizulhasni Awang	Malaysia
silver medal	Mohd Shariz Efendi Shahrin	Malaysia
bronze medal	Muhammad Nur Fathoni	Indonesia

=== First round ===
==== Heat 1 ====
Rank	Name	Time	Note
1	Mohd Shariz Efendi Shahrin (MAS)	10.809	Q
2	Pongthep Tapimay (THA)	10.962	Q
3	Reno Yudha Sansoko (INA)	11.093	Q
4	Abd Hadrie Morsidi (BRU)	13.042	

==== Heat 2 ====
Rank	Name	Time	Note
1	Azizulhasni Awang (MAS)	10.664	Q
2	Satjakul Sianglam (THA)	10.705	Q
3	Muhammad Nur Fathoni (INA)	10.896	Q
4	Mohamed Elyas Yusoff (SGP)	11.161	

=== Final ===
Rank	Name	Time	Note
1st place, gold medalist(s)	Azizulhasni Awang (MAS)		
2nd place, silver medalist(s)	Mohd Shariz Efendi Shahrin (MAS)		
3rd place, bronze medalist(s)	Muhammad Nur Fathoni (INA)		
4	Reno Yudha Sansoko (INA)		
5	Pongthep Tapimay (THA)		
6	Satjakul Sianglam (THA)		

== Women's Keirin ==
Women's Keirin at the 2017 SEA Games
- Venue: Velodrom Nasional Malaysia
- Date: 29 August 2017
- Competitors: 8 from 4 nations

Medalists
gold medal	Fatehah Mustapa	Malaysia
silver medal	Farina Shawati Adnan	Malaysia
bronze medal	Watinee Luekajorn	Thailand

=== Final ===
Rank	Name	Time	Note
1st place, gold medalist(s)	Fatehah Mustapa (MAS)	11.736	
2nd place, silver medalist(s)	Farina Shawati Adnan (MAS)	12.096	
3rd place, bronze medalist(s)	Watinee Luekajorn (THA)	12.235	
4	Uyun Muzizah (INA)	12.574	
5	Ayustina Delia Priatna (INA)	12.588	
6	Pannaray Rasee (THA)	13.260	
7	Dinah Chan Siew Kheng (SGP)	13.295	
8	Dana Joy Loo Tze En (SGP)	13.461	

== Men's Omnium ==
Men's Omnium at the 2017 SEA Games
- Venue: Velodrom Nasional Malaysia
- Date: 28 August 2017

=== Overall results ===
Rank	Name	SR	IP	ER	TT	FL	PR	Total
1st place, gold medalist(s)								
2nd place, silver medalist(s)								
3rd place, bronze medalist(s)								

=== Event results ===
==== Scratch race ====
Rank	Name	Laps down	Points
1			

==== Individual pursuit ====
Rank	Name	Time	Points	Overall	Overall rank
1					

==== Elimination race ====
Rank	Name	Points	Overall	Overall rank
1				

==== Time trial ====
Rank	Name	Time	Points	Overall	Overall rank
1					

==== Flying lap ====
Rank	Name	Time	Points	Overall	Overall rank
1					

==== Points race ====
Rank	Name	Points	Overall	Overall rank
1				

== Women's Omnium ==
Women's Omnium at the 2017 SEA Games
- Venue: Velodrom Nasional Malaysia
- Date: 27 August 2017

=== Overall results ===
Rank	Name	SR	IP	ER	TT	FL	PR	Total
1st place, gold medalist(s)								
2nd place, silver medalist(s)								
3rd place, bronze medalist(s)								

=== Event results ===
==== Scratch race ====
Rank	Name	Laps down	Points
1			

==== Individual pursuit ====
Rank	Name	Time	Points	Overall	Overall rank
1					

==== Elimination race ====
Rank	Name	Points	Overall	Overall rank
1				

==== Time trial ====
Rank	Name	Time	Points	Overall	Overall rank
1					

==== Flying lap ====
Rank	Name	Time	Points	Overall	Overall rank
1					

==== Points race ====
Rank	Name	Points	Overall	Overall rank
1				

== Men's pursuit ==
Men's pursuit at the 2017 SEA Games
- Venue: Velodrom Nasional Malaysia
- Date: 28 August 2017

=== First round ===
Rank	Name	Nation	Time	Behind	Notes
1					Q
2					Q
3					q
4					q
5					

=== Finals ===
Rank	Name	Nation	Time	Behind
Gold Medal Race
1st place, gold medalist(s)				
2nd place, silver medalist(s)				
Bronze Medal Race
3rd place, bronze medalist(s)				
4				

== Men's team pursuit ==
Men's team pursuit at the 2017 SEA Games
- Venue: Velodrom Nasional Malaysia
- Date: 29 August 2017

=== First round ===
Rank	Nation	Names	Result	Notes
1				Q
2				Q
3				q
4				q

=== Finals ===
Rank	Nation	Names	Result	Note
Gold Medal Race
1st place, gold medalist(s)				
2nd place, silver medalist(s)				
Bronze Medal Race
3rd place, bronze medalist(s)				
4				

== Women's team pursuit ==
Women's team pursuit at the 2017 SEA Games
- Venue: TBA
- Date: August 2017

=== First round ===
Rank	Nation	Names	Result	Notes
1				Q
2				Q
3				q
4				q

=== Finals ===
Rank	Nation	Names	Result	Note
Gold Medal Race
1st place, gold medalist(s)				
2nd place, silver medalist(s)				
Bronze Medal Race
3rd place, bronze medalist(s)				
4				

== Men's sprint ==
Men's sprint at the 2017 SEA Games
- Venue: TBA
- Date: August 2017

=== Semi-finals ===
Heat 1

Name	Time (Race 1)	Time (Race 2)	Time (Decider)

Heat 2

Name	Time (Race 1)	Time (Race 2)	Time (Decider)

=== Finals ===
Bronze medal match

Name	Time (Race 1)	Time (Race 2)	Time (Decider)

Gold medal match

Name	Time (Race 1)	Time (Race 2)	Time (Decider)

== Women's sprint ==
Women's sprint at the 2017 SEA Games
- Venue: TBA
- Date: August 2017

=== Semi-finals ===
Heat 1

Name	Time (Race 1)	Time (Race 2)	Time (Decider)

Heat 2

Name	Time (Race 1)	Time (Race 2)	Time (Decider)

=== Finals ===
Bronze medal match

Name	Time (Race 1)	Time (Race 2)	Time (Decider)

Gold medal match

Name	Time (Race 1)	Time (Race 2)	Time (Decider)

== Men's team sprint ==
Men's team sprint at the 2017 SEA Games
- Venue: TBA
- Date: August 2017

=== First round ===
Rank	Nation	Names	Result	Notes
1				Q
2				Q
3				q
4				q

=== Finals ===
Rank	Nation	Names	Result	Note
Gold Medal Race
1st place, gold medalist(s)				
2nd place, silver medalist(s)				
Bronze Medal Race
3rd place, bronze medalist(s)				
4				

== Women's team sprint ==
Women's team sprint at the 2017 SEA Games
- Venue: TBA
- Date: August 2017

=== First round ===
Rank	Nation	Names	Result	Notes
1				Q
2				Q
3				q
4				q

=== Finals ===
Rank	Nation	Names	Result	Note
Gold Medal Race
1st place, gold medalist(s)				
2nd place, silver medalist(s)				
Bronze Medal Race
3rd place, bronze medalist(s)				
4				

== Men's time trial ==
Men's time trial at the 2017 SEA Games
- Venue: TBA
- Date: August 2017

=== Final ===
Rank	Name	Nation	Time	Behind	Notes
1st place, gold medalist(s)					
2nd place, silver medalist(s)					
3rd place, bronze medalist(s)					

== Women's time trial ==
Men's time trial at the 2017 SEA Games
- Venue: TBA
- Date: August 2017

=== Final ===
Rank	Name	Nation	Time	Behind	Notes
1st place, gold medalist(s)					
2nd place, silver medalist(s)					
3rd place, bronze medalist(s)					
