= Basketball at the 2017 SEA Games =

21st SEA Games Basketball Tournament
- Kuala Lumpur 2017

Tournament details
- SEA Games: 2017 SEA Games
- Host nation: Malaysia
- City: Kuala Lumpur
- Venue: MABA Stadium
- Duration: 20 – 26 August 2017

Men's tournament
- Teams: 9
Medals
Gold medalists	Philippines
Silver medalists	Indonesia
Bronze medalists	Thailand

Women's tournament
- Teams: 7
Medals
Gold medalists	Malaysia
Silver medalists	Thailand
Bronze medalists	Indonesia

Official website
- www.kualalumpur2017.com.my

Tournaments
← Singapore 2015	Philippines 2019 →

The Basketball competitions at the 2017 SEA Games in Kuala Lumpur took place from 20 to 26 August at MABA Stadium in Kuala Lumpur.

The 2017 Games featured competitions in two events.

== Competition schedule ==
The following was the competition schedule for the basketball competitions:

P	Preliminaries	RR	Round-robin	CM	Classification	½	Semifinals	B	3rd place play-off	F	Final

Event	Sun 20	Mon 21	Tue 22	Wed 23	Thu 24	Fri 25		Sat 26		
Men	P	P	P	P	P	CM	½	CM	B	F
Women	RR	RR	RR	RR	RR	RR		RR		

== Participation ==
=== Participating nations ===
- Cambodia (12)
- Indonesia (24)
- Laos (12)
- Malaysia (24)
- Myanmar (22)
- Philippines (24)
- Singapore (24)
- Thailand (24)
- Vietnam (24)

== Men's competition ==
=== Preliminary round ===
==== Group A ====
Pos	Team	Pld	W	L	PF	PA	PD	Pts	Qualification
1	Philippines	3	3	0	308	174	+134	6	Advance to knockout round
2	Thailand	3	2	1	274	191	+83	5	Advance to knockout round
3	Malaysia (H)	3	1	2	236	230	+6	4	Qualification to 5th place match
4	Myanmar	3	0	3	111	334	−223	3	Qualification to 7th place match

Updated to match(es) played on 23 August 2017. Source: Schedule
Rules for classification: (1) Tournament points, (2) Head-to-head tournament points, (3) Head-to-head goal average, (4) Overall goal average, (5) Drawing of lots
(H) Hosts

==== Group B ====
Pos	Team	Pld	W	L	PF	PA	PD	Pts	Qualification
1	Indonesia	4	4	0	271	197	+74	8	Advance to knockout round
2	Singapore	4	3	1	252	185	+67	7	Advance to knockout round
3	Vietnam	4	2	2	271	240	+31	6	Qualification to 5th place match
4	Cambodia	4	1	3	317	360	−43	5	Qualification to 7th place match
5	Laos	4	0	4	170	299	−129	4	Qualification to 8th place match

Updated to match(es) played on 23 August 2017. Source: Schedule
Rules for classification: (1) Tournament points, (2) Head-to-head tournament points, (3) Head-to-head goal average, (4) Overall goal average, (5) Drawing of lots

=== Knockout round ===
Semi-finals
25 August
Philippines	68
Singapore	60
25 August
Indonesia	79
Thailand	74

Gold medal match
26 August
Philippines	94
Indonesia	55
Bronze medal match
26 August
Singapore	55
Thailand	65

== Women's competition ==
Pos	Team	Pld	W	L	PF	PA	PD	Pts	Final Result
1	Malaysia (H)	6	6	0	504	335	+169	12	Gold medal
2	Thailand	6	4	2	432	307	+125	10	Silver medal
3	Indonesia	6	4	2	464	359	+105	10	Bronze medal
4	Philippines	6	4	2	522	336	+186	10	
5	Singapore	6	2	4	401	438	−37	8	
6	Vietnam	6	1	5	317	518	−201	7	
7	Myanmar	6	0	6	276	623	−347	6	

Updated to match(es) played on 26 August 2017. Source: Schedule
Rules for classification: (1) Tournament points, (2) Head-to-head tournament points, (3) Head-to-head goal average, (4) Overall goal average, (5) Drawing of lots
(H) Hosts

== Medal summary ==
=== Medal table ===
* Host nation (Singapore)

Rank	Nation	Gold	Silver	Bronze	Total
1	Malaysia*	1	0	0	1
1	Philippines	1	0	0	1
3	Indonesia	0	1	1	2
3	Thailand	0	1	1	2
Totals (4 entries)		2	2	2	6

=== Medalists ===
Event	Gold	Silver	Bronze
Men's tournament	Philippines (PHI); Kiefer Ravena; Bobby Ray Parks Jr. Troy Rosario; Von Pessumal; Christian Standhardinger; Carl Bryan Cruz; Kobe Paras; Baser Amer; Raymar Jose; Almond Vosotros; Mike Tolomia; Kevin Ferrer	Indonesia (INA); Mario Wuysang; Abraham Damar Grahita; Kevin Yonas Argadiba Sitorus; Christian Ronald Sitepu; Arki Dikania Wisnu; Diftha Pratama; Hardianus Lakudu; Andakara Prastawa Dhyaksa; Sandy Febriansyakh Kurniawan; Ebrahim Enguio Lopez; Firman Dwi Nugroho; Vincent Rivaldi Kosasih	Thailand (THA); Tyler Lamb; Sukhdave Ghogar; Chanatip Jakrawan; Darongpan Apiromvilaichai; Kannut Samerjai; Ratdech Kruatiwa; Bandit Lakhan; Chanachon Klahan; Nattakarn Muangboon; Patiphan Klahan; Teerawat Chanthachon; Chitchai Ananti
Women's tournament	Malaysia (MAS); Pang Hui Pin; Nur Izzati Yaakob; Kalaimathi Rajintiran; Yap Fook Yee; Eugene Ting Chiau Teng; Wong Mei Chyn; Chong Yin Yin; Saw Wei Yin; Ooi Poh Yee; Tai Chia Qian; Magdelene Low Phey Chyi; Ng Shi Yeng	Thailand (THA); Penphan Yothanan; Juthamas Jantakan; Juthathip Mathuros; Supira Klanbut; Suree Phromrat; Wipaporn Saechua; Supavadee Kunchuan; Suwimon Sangtad; Atchara Kaichaiyapoom; Naruemol Banmoo; Nutchavarin Buapa; Thidaporn Maihom	Indonesia (INA); Agustin Elya Gradita Retong; Natasha Debby Christaline; Yuni Anggraeni; Gabriel Sophia; Mega Nanda Perdana Putri; Lea Elvensia Wolobubo Kahol; Regita Pramesti; Kadek Pratita Citta Dewi; Mariam Ulfah; Sumiati; Yuliana Anggita Soemaryono; Henny Sutjiono

== See also ==
- Wheelchair basketball at the 2017 ASEAN Para Games
