= Golf at the 2017 SEA Games =

- Venue: The Mines Resort and Golf Club
- Location: Seri Kembangan, Selangor, Malaysia
- Date: 22–26 August 2017

The golf competitions at the 2017 SEA Games in Kuala Lumpur, were held at The Mines Resort and Golf Club in Selangor.

In 2017 edition, men's (individual and team) and women's (individual and team) tournaments were contested.

== Schedule ==
The golf tournaments at the 2017 Southeast Asian Games were held in five consecutive days, respectively 22 August to 26 August 2017.

== Participation ==
=== Participating nations ===
- Brunei
- Cambodia
- Indonesia
- Laos
- Malaysia
- Myanmar
- Philippines
- Singapore
- Thailand
- Timor-Leste
- Vietnam

== Medal summary ==
=== Medal table ===
Host nation (Malaysia)

Rank	Nation	Gold	Silver	Bronze	Total
1	Thailand	3	2	1	6
2	Singapore	1	1	0	2
3	Indonesia	0	1	1	2
4	Malaysia*	0	0	1	1
4	Philippines	0	0	1	1
Totals (5 entries)		4	4	4	12

=== Medalists ===
Event	Gold	Silver	Bronze
Men's individual	Kosuke Hamamoto; Thailand	Marc Ong Chong Ching; Singapore	Kammalas Namuangruk; Thailand
Men's team	Singapore (SGP); Gregory Raymund Foo Yongen; Joshua Shou Minqing; Marc Ong Chong Ching; Joshua Ho Shengliang	Thailand (THA); Kammalas Namuangruk; Kosuke Hamamoto; Sadom Kaewkanjana; Witchayanon Chothirunrungrueng	Indonesia (INA); Almay Rayhan Yagutah; Jonathan Wijono; Kevin Caesario Akbar; Naraajie Emerald Ramadhan Putra
Women's individual	Atthaya Thitikul; Thailand	Thitapa Pakdeesettakul; Thailand	Go Lois Kaye Lo; Philippines
Women's team	Thailand (THA); Atthaya Thitikul; Manuschaya Zeemakorn; Thitapa Pakdeesettakul	Indonesia (INA); Ida Ayu Indira Melati Putri; Rivani Adelia Sihotang; Tatiana Jaqueline Wijaya	Malaysia (MAS); Nur Durriyah Damian; Ashley Lau Jen Wen; Loy Hee Ying
