= Badminton at the 2017 SEA Games =

- Venue: Axiata Arena
- Date: 22–29 August 2017
- Nations: 10

The badminton competitions at the 2017 SEA Games in Kuala Lumpur were held at Axiata Arena in Bukit Jalil.

The 2017 Games featured competitions in seven events (3 men events, 3 women events, and 1 mixed events).

== Participating nations ==
- Brunei (1)
- Cambodia (6)
- Indonesia (20)
- Laos (10)
- Malaysia (20)
- Myanmar (12)
- Philippines (6)
- Singapore (19)
- Thailand (20)
- Vietnam (13)

== Medal summary ==
=== Medalists ===
| Event | Gold | Silver | Bronze |
|---|---|---|---|
| Men's singles | Indonesia; Jonatan Christie | Thailand; Khosit Phetpradab | Vietnam; Nguyễn Tiến Minh |
| Men's singles | Indonesia; Jonatan Christie | Thailand; Khosit Phetpradab | Indonesia; Ihsan Maulana Mustofa |
| Women's singles | Malaysia; Goh Jin Wei | Malaysia; Soniia Cheah Su Ya | Thailand; Pornpawee Chochuwong |
| Women's singles | Malaysia; Goh Jin Wei | Malaysia; Soniia Cheah Su Ya | Indonesia; Gregoria Mariska Tunjung |
| Men's doubles | Thailand; Kittinupong Kedren; Dechapol Puavaranukroh | Malaysia; Ong Yew Sin; Teo Ee Yi | Indonesia; Fajar Alfian; Muhammad Rian Ardianto |
| Men's doubles | Thailand; Kittinupong Kedren; Dechapol Puavaranukroh | Malaysia; Ong Yew Sin; Teo Ee Yi | Thailand; Bodin Isara; Nipitphon Phuangphuapet |
| Women's doubles | Thailand; Jongkolphan Kititharakul; Rawinda Prajongjai | Thailand; Puttita Supajirakul; Sapsiree Taerattanachai | Malaysia; Vivian Hoo; Woon Khe Wei |
| Women's doubles | Thailand; Jongkolphan Kititharakul; Rawinda Prajongjai | Thailand; Puttita Supajirakul; Sapsiree Taerattanachai | Vietnam; Đinh Thị Phương Hồng; Đỗ Thị Hoài |
| Mixed doubles | Thailand; Dechapol Puavaranukroh; Sapsiree Taerattanachai | Malaysia; Goh Soon Huat; Shevon Jemie Lai | Malaysia; Chan Peng Soon; Cheah Yee See |
| Mixed doubles | Thailand; Dechapol Puavaranukroh; Sapsiree Taerattanachai | Malaysia; Goh Soon Huat; Shevon Jemie Lai | Thailand; Bodin Isara; Savitree Amitrapai |
| Men's team | Indonesia; Fajar Alfian; Berry Angriawan; Muhammad Rian Ardianto; Jonatan Christie; Hafiz Faizal; Hardianto; Firman Abdul Kholik; Panji Ahmad Maulana; Ihsan Maulana Mustofa; Edi Subaktiar | Malaysia; Chan Peng Soon; Goh Soon Huat; Goh Sze Fei; Nur Izzuddin; Lee Zii Jia; Lim Chi Wing; Ong Yew Sin; Soong Joo Ven; Teo Ee Yi; Iskandar Zulkarnain Zainuddin | Thailand; Suppanyu Avihingsanon; Bodin Isara; Kittinupong Kedren; Adulrach Namkul; Khosit Phetpradab; Nipitphon Phuangphuapet; Trawut Potieng; Dechapol Puavaranukroh; Kantaphon Wangcharoen; Nanthakarn Yordphaisong |
| Men's team | Indonesia; Fajar Alfian; Berry Angriawan; Muhammad Rian Ardianto; Jonatan Christie; Hafiz Faizal; Hardianto; Firman Abdul Kholik; Panji Ahmad Maulana; Ihsan Maulana Mustofa; Edi Subaktiar | Malaysia; Chan Peng Soon; Goh Soon Huat; Goh Sze Fei; Nur Izzuddin; Lee Zii Jia; Lim Chi Wing; Ong Yew Sin; Soong Joo Ven; Teo Ee Yi; Iskandar Zulkarnain Zainuddin | Singapore; Danny Bawa Chrisnanta; Terry Hee; Lee Jian Liang; Loh Kean Hean; Loh Kean Yew; Ryan Ng; Dominic Soh; Muhammad Elaf Tan; Hendra Wijaya; Jason Wong |
| Women's team | Thailand; Savitree Amitrapai; Pattarasuda Chaiwan; Pornpawee Chochuwong; Nitchaon Jindapol; Chananchida Jucharoen; Jongkolphan Kititharakul; Busanan Ongbamrungphan; Rawinda Prajongjai; Puttita Supajirakul; Sapsiree Taerattanachai | Malaysia; Soniia Cheah Su Ya; Cheah Yee See; Chow Mei Kuan; Goh Jin Wei; Ho Yen Mei; Vivian Hoo; Shevon Jemie Lai; Lee Meng Yean; Lee Ying Ying; Woon Khe Wei | Singapore; Grace Chua; Ker'sara Koh; Liang Xiaoyu; Insyirah Khan; Ren-ne Ong; Sito Jia Rong; Tan Wei Han; Crystal Wong; Yeo Jia Min |
| Women's team | Thailand; Savitree Amitrapai; Pattarasuda Chaiwan; Pornpawee Chochuwong; Nitchaon Jindapol; Chananchida Jucharoen; Jongkolphan Kititharakul; Busanan Ongbamrungphan; Rawinda Prajongjai; Puttita Supajirakul; Sapsiree Taerattanachai | Malaysia; Soniia Cheah Su Ya; Cheah Yee See; Chow Mei Kuan; Goh Jin Wei; Ho Yen Mei; Vivian Hoo; Shevon Jemie Lai; Lee Meng Yean; Lee Ying Ying; Woon Khe Wei | Indonesia; Shella Devi Aulia; Dinar Dyah Ayustine; Fitriani; Ni Ketut Mahadewi Istarani; Greysia Polii; Rosyita Eka Putri Sari; Apriani Rahayu; Hanna Ramadini; Gregoria Mariska Tunjung; Gloria Emanuelle Widjaja |

== Medal standings ==
* Host nation (Malaysia)

| Rank | Nation | Gold | Silver | Bronze | Total |
|---|---|---|---|---|---|
| 1 | Thailand (THA) | 4 | 2 | 4 | 10 |
| 2 | Indonesia (INA) | 2 | 0 | 4 | 6 |
| 3 | Malaysia (MAS)* | 1 | 5 | 2 | 8 |
| 4 | Singapore (SIN) | 0 | 0 | 2 | 2 |
| 4 | Vietnam (VIE) | 0 | 0 | 2 | 2 |
| Totals (5 entries) | | 7 | 7 | 14 | 28 |

== See also ==
- Badminton at the 2017 ASEAN Para Games
