= Badminton at the 2017 SEA Games – Women's team =

Badminton – Women's team at the 2017 SEA Games
- Venue: Axiata Arena
- Dates: 23–25 August
- Nations: 7

Medalists
gold medal	Thailand (THA)
silver medal	Malaysia (MAS)
bronze medal	Indonesia (INA)
bronze medal	Singapore (SGP)

The badminton women's team tournament at the 2017 SEA Games in Kuala Lumpur was held from 23 to 25 August at the Axiata Arena, Kuala Lumpur, Malaysia.

== Schedule ==
All times are Malaysia Standard Time (UTC+08:00)

Date	Time	Event
Tuesday, 22 August	09:00	Quarter-final
Wednesday, 23 August	15:00	Semi-final
Thursday, 24 August	09:00	Gold medal match

== Results ==
Quarter-final
Singapore (SGP)	3
Vietnam (VIE)	1
Myanmar (MYA)	0
Malaysia (MAS)	3

Semi-Final
Thailand (THA)	3
Singapore (SGP)	0
Malaysia (MAS)	3
Indonesia (INA)	0

Final
Thailand (THA)	3
Malaysia (MAS)	1

=== Quarter-final ===
22 August	Singapore (SGP)	3–1	Vietnam (VIE)

Yeo Jia Min	1–2	Nguyễn Thùy Linh	21–16, 19–21, 19–21
Grace Chua	2–1	Lê Thu Huyền	12–21, 21–19, 21–14
Insyirah Khan	2–0	Đinh Thị Phương Hồng	21–19, 21–17
Ren-ne Ong / Crystal Wong	2–0	Nguyễn Thị Sen / Phạm Như Thảo	21–17, 23–21

22 August	Myanmar (MYA)	0–3	Malaysia (MAS)

Thet Htar Thuzar	0–2	Soniia Cheah Su Ya	9–21, 19–21
Nwe Nwe Aung / Su Win Aye	0–2	Vivian Hoo / Woon Khe Wei	5–21, 6–21
Gone Yi Lin Khin	0–2	Goh Jin Wei	6–21, 8–21

=== Semi-final ===
23 August	Thailand (THA)	3–0	Singapore (SGP)

Busanan Ongbamrungphan	2–0	Yeo Jia Min	21–7, 21–12
Puttita Supajirakul / Sapsiree Taerattanachai	2–0	Ren-ne Ong / Crystal Wong	21–13, 21–17
Nitchaon Jindapol	2–0	Grace Chua	21–4, 21–15

23 August	Malaysia (MAS)	3–0	Indonesia (INA)

Soniia Cheah Su Ya	2–0	Fitriani	21–17 21–17
Vivian Hoo / Woon Khe Wei	0–0^{r}	Ni Ketut Mahadewi Istarani / Rosyita Eka Putri Sari	7–5 retired
Goh Jin Wei	2–0	Hanna Ramadini	21–16 21–13

=== Final ===
24 August, 0900H UTC+08	Thailand (THA)	3–1	Malaysia (MAS)

Busanan Ongbamrungphan	2–0	Soniia Cheah Su Ya	21–12, 21–10
Puttita Supajirakul / Sapsiree Taerattanachai	2–1	Vivian Hoo / Woon Khe Wei	9–21, 21–11, 21–18
Nitchaon Jindapol	1–2	Goh Jin Wei	20–22, 25–23, 20–22
Jongkolphan Kititharakul / Rawinda Prajongjai	2–1	Chow Mei Kuan / Lee Meng Yean	21–12, 16–21, 21–18

== See also ==
- Men's team tournament
- Individual event
