= Waterskiing at the 2017 SEA Games =

- Venue: Water Sports Complex
- Location: Putrajaya, Malaysia
- Date: 25–29 August 2017

The water skiing and wakeboarding competitions at the 2017 Southeast Asian Games took place at Water Sports Complex, Putrajaya.

== Medal table ==
* Host nation (Malaysia)

Rank	Nation	Gold	Silver	Bronze	Total
1	Malaysia*	4	1	2	7
2	Singapore	3	2	2	7
3	Indonesia	2	7	6	15
4	Thailand	2	1	0	3
5	Philippines	0	0	1	1
Totals (5 entries)		11	11	11	33

== Medalists ==
=== Water skiing ===
Event	Gold	Silver	Bronze
Men's jumping	Muh Zahidi Putu Pranoto; Indonesia	Ade Hermana; Indonesia	Syahir Nasir; Malaysia
Men's slalom	Mark Leong Kok Loong; Singapore	Indra Hardinata; Indonesia	Syahir Nasir; Malaysia
Men's trick	Adam Yoong Hanifah; Malaysia	Dimas Ridho Suprihono; Indonesia	Febrianto Kadir; Indonesia
Men's overall	Muh Zahidi Putu Pranoto; Indonesia	Febrianto Kadir; Indonesia	Mark Leong Kok Loong; Singapore
Women's jumping	Aaliyah Yoong Hanifah; Malaysia	Rossi Rusdi Amir; Indonesia	Nur Alimah Priambodo; Indonesia
Women's slalom	Sasha Siew Hoon Christian; Singapore	Aaliyah Yoong Hanifah; Malaysia	Ummu Thoyibhatus Sholikah; Indonesia
Women's trick	Aaliyah Yoong Hanifah; Malaysia	Sabelle Ashley Kee Jen; Singapore	Nur Alimah Priambodo; Indonesia
Women's overall	Aaliyah Yoong Hanifah; Malaysia	Nur Alimah Priambodo; Indonesia	Rossi Rusdi Amir; Indonesia

=== Wakeboarding ===
Event	Gold	Silver	Bronze
Men's individual	Padiwat Jaemjan; Thailand	Tatsanai Kuankoonrat; Thailand	Mark Griffin; Philippines
Women's individual	Sasha Siew Hoon Christian; Singapore	Galuh Mutiara Maulidina; Indonesia	Gooi Jia Yi; Singapore
Mixed team	Thailand; Tatsanai Kuakoonrat; Padiwat Jaemjan; Srirasin Khamklom; Akkarawin Paneesong; Alisa Earrilahaphand; Thidarat Limvuttegrijerat	Singapore; Sasha Siew Hoon Christian; Gooi Jia Yi; Samuel Chua Min Yu; Melanie Jane Tan Bee Yen; Ng Sim Hwee; Joshua Tay Li Min	Indonesia; Alek Hanif; Dini Imaniar; Galuh Mutiara Maulidina
