= Ryan Ng =

Singaporean badminton player (born 1998)

Ryan Ng Zin Rei 黄敬卫
Personal information
- Born: 14 January 1998 (age 28) Singapore
- Height: 1.77 m (5 ft 10 in)
- Weight: 70 kg (154 lb)

Sport
- Country: Singapore
- Sport: Badminton

Men's singles
- Highest ranking: 101 (7 September 2017)
- BWF profile
Medal record
Men's badminton
Representing Singapore
SEA Games
Bronze medal – third place	2015 Singapore	Men's team
Bronze medal – third place	2017 Kuala Lumpur	Men's team

Ryan Ng Zin Rei (simplified Chinese: 黄敬卫; traditional Chinese: 黃敬衛; born 14 January 1998) is a Singaporean badminton player. In 2011, he elected to join the Singapore national junior team when he was 13 years old. Ng was educated at Raffles Institution, but he moved to Singapore Sports School to prepare himself competed at the 2014 Youth Olympics. In 2015, he attended the Republic Polytechnic Institute. He competed in some international junior tournament and reach the semifinals at the 2014 Badminton Asia U17, quarterfinals at the 2015 Dutch and German Juniors, and at the 2016 BWF World Junior Championships. He also the runner-up at the 2016 India Junior and won the Malaysia Junior at the same year. Ng was the men's team bronze medallists at the 2015 and 2017 SEA Games. He competed at the 2018 Commonwealth Games.

== Achievements ==
=== BWF International Challenge/Series ===
Men's singles
Year	Tournament	Opponent	Score	Result
2017	Singapore International	(Singapore) Loh Kean Yew	15–21, 15–21	(silver) Runner-up

BWF International Challenge tournament
BWF International Series tournament
