= Kittinupong Kedren =

Thai badminton player (born 1996)

Personal information
- Born: 19 July 1996 (age 30) Songkla, Thailand
- Height: 1.63 m (5 ft 4 in)

Sport
- Country: Thailand
- Sport: Badminton
- Handedness: Right

Men's doubles
- Highest ranking: 12 (with Dechapol Puavaranukroh, 8 July 2025); 16 (with Supak Jomkoh, 3 September 2024)
- Current ranking: 30 (with Dechapol Puavaranukroh, 5 May 2026)
- BWF profile
Medal record
Men's badminton
Representing Thailand
Sudirman Cup
Bronze medal – third place	2017 Gold Coast	Mixed team
Bronze medal – third place	2019 Nanning	Mixed team
Asia Mixed Team Championships
Bronze medal – third place	2017 Ho Chi Minh	Mixed team
SEA Games
Gold medal – first place	2017 Kuala Lumpur	Men's doubles
Bronze medal – third place	2017 Kuala Lumpur	Men's team
Bronze medal – third place	2019 Philippines	Men's team
Bronze medal – third place	2025 Thailand	Men's team
World Junior Championships
Gold medal – first place	2014 Alor Setar	Boys' doubles
Bronze medal – third place	2014 Alor Setar	Mixed team

Kittinupong Kedren (Thai: กิตตินุพงษ์ เกตุเรน; born 19 July 1996) is a Thai badminton player. He was the gold medalists at the 2014 BWF World Junior Championships in the boys' doubles event with his partner Dechapol Puavaranukroh, and later at the 2017 SEA Games in the men's doubles event. Partnered with Supak Jomkoh, he competed in the 2024 Paris Olympics where the duo finished in the quarter-finals.

== Achievements ==
=== SEA Games ===
Men's doubles
Year	Venue	Partner	Opponent	Score	Result
2017	Axiata Arena; Kuala Lumpur, Malaysia	(Thailand) Dechapol Puavaranukroh	(Malaysia) Ong Yew Sin (Malaysia) Teo Ee Yi	21–19, 20–22, 21–17	Gold

=== BWF World Junior Championships ===
Boys' doubles
Year	Venue	Partner	Opponent	Score	Result
2014	Stadium Sultan Abdul Halim; Alor Setar, Malaysia	(Thailand) Dechapol Puavaranukroh	(Japan) Masahide Nakata (Japan) Katsuki Tamate	21–16, 21–18	Gold

=== BWF World Tour (1 title) ===
The BWF World Tour, which was announced on 19 March 2017 and implemented in 2018, is a series of elite badminton tournaments sanctioned by the Badminton World Federation (BWF). The BWF World Tour is divided into levels of World Tour Finals, Super 1000, Super 750, Super 500, Super 300, and the BWF Tour Super 100.

Men's doubles
Year	Tournament	Level	Partner	Opponent	Score	Result
2025	Swiss Open	Super 300	(Thailand) Dechapol Puavaranukroh	(Indonesia) Muhammad Shohibul Fikri (Indonesia) Daniel Marthin	21–15, 18–21, 21–14	(gold) Winner

=== BWF International Challenge/Series ===
Men's doubles
Year	Tournament	Partner	Opponent	Score	Result
2014	Smiling Fish International	(Thailand) Dechapol Puavaranukroh	(Thailand) Watchara Buranakruea (Thailand) Trawut Potieng	21–12, 18–21, 14–21	(silver) Runner-up
2016	Polish Open	(Thailand) Dechapol Puavaranukroh	(Indonesia) Hardianto (Indonesia) Kenas Adi Haryanto	5–21, 21–18, 15–21	(silver) Runner-up

BWF International Challenge tournament
BWF International Series tournament
