= Loh Kean Hean =

Singaporean badminton player (born 1995)

Loh Kean Hean 骆建贤
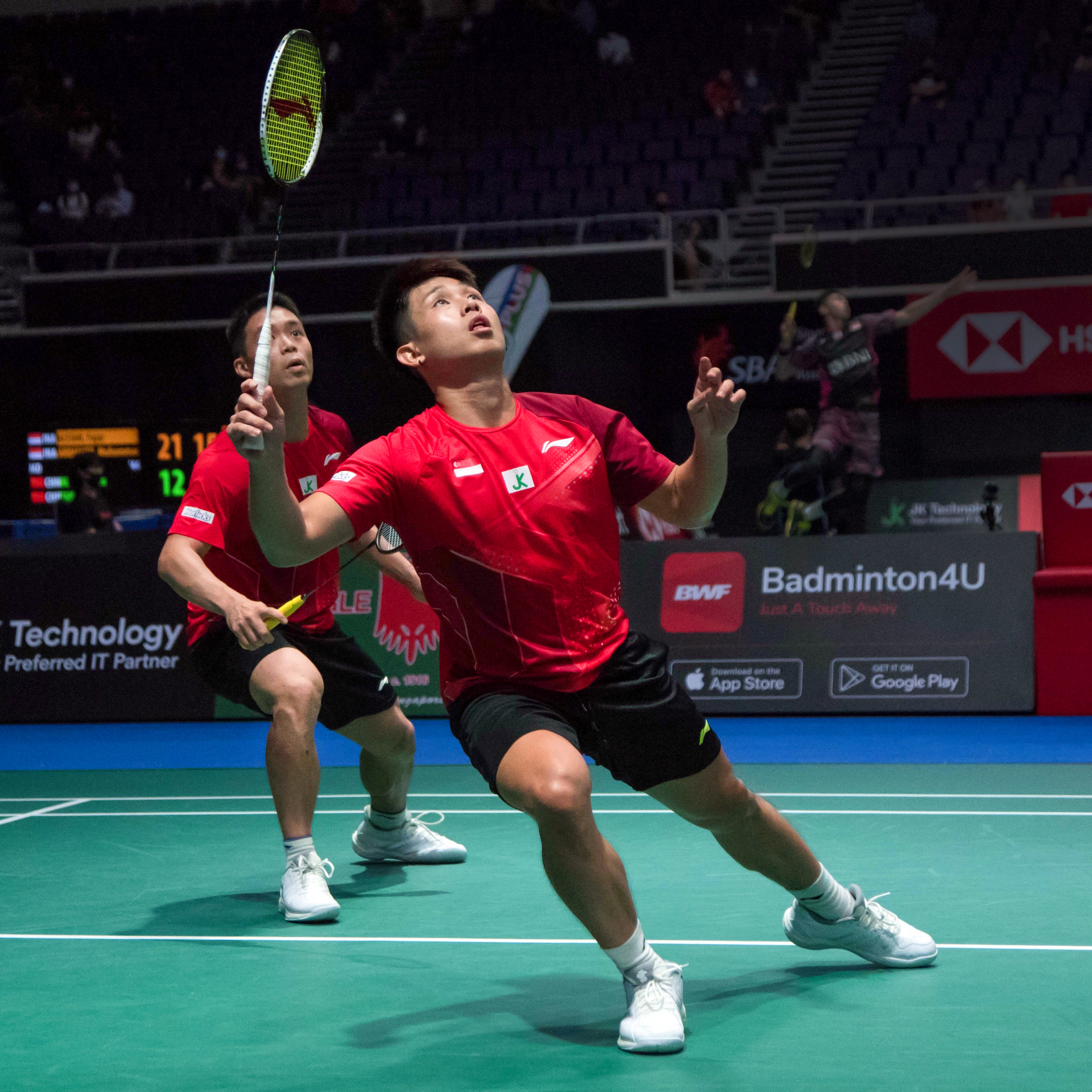
- Loh at the 2022 Singapore Open

Personal information
- Born: 12 March 1995 (age 31) Penang, Malaysia
- Height: 1.70 m (5 ft 7 in)
- Weight: 67 kg (148 lb)

Sport
- Country: Singapore
- Sport: Badminton
- Handedness: Right
- Coached by: Lim Pek Siah
- Retired: 4 May 2025

Men's & mixed doubles
- Highest ranking: 22 (MD with Terry Hee 27 December 2022); 133 (XD with Dellis Yuliana 5 March 2015)
- BWF profile
Medal record
Men's badminton
Representing Singapore
Commonwealth Games
Bronze medal – third place	2022 Birmingham	Mixed team
Asia Team Championships
Bronze medal – third place	2022 Selangor	Men's team
SEA Games
Bronze medal – third place	2015 Singapore	Men's team
Bronze medal – third place	2017 Kuala Lumpur	Men's team
Bronze medal – third place	2019 Philippines	Men's team
Bronze medal – third place	2021 Vietnam	Men's doubles
Bronze medal – third place	2021 Vietnam	Men's team
Bronze medal – third place	2023 Cambodia	Men's team

Loh Kean Hean (Chinese: 骆建贤; pinyin: Luò Jiànxián; born 12 March 1995) is a retired Singaporean badminton player.

== Career ==
Born in Penang, Loh permanently moved to Singapore in 2009 after receiving a scholarship from the Singapore Badminton Association (SBA). His younger brother followed him soon after.

Loh studied at Montfort Secondary School in Hougang while training with the Singapore national badminton team.

In 2014, he was the mixed doubles runner-up at the Singapore International Series tournament partnered with Dellis Yuliana, and in 2015, he won the men's doubles title with Terry Hee.

== Personal life ==
Loh has 2 elder brothers and a younger brother, Loh Kean Yew, who is also a member of the Singapore national badminton team and is the 2021 BWF World Champion in the Men's singles Discipline.

== Achievements ==
=== SEA Games ===
Men's doubles
Year	Venue	Partner	Opponent	Score	Result
2021	Bac Giang Gymnasium; Bắc Giang, Vietnam	(Singapore) Terry Hee	(Indonesia) Pramudya Kusumawardana (Indonesia) Yeremia Rambitan	21–15, 17–21, 19–21	Bronze

=== BWF International Challenge/Series (4 titles, 2 runners-up) ===
Men's doubles
Year	Tournament	Partner	Opponent	Score	Result
2015	Singapore International	(Singapore) Terry Hee	(Indonesia) Hardianto (Indonesia) Kenas Adi Haryanto	13–21, 21–16, 21–19	(gold) Winner
2019	Estonian International	(Singapore) Danny Bawa Chrisnanta	(England) Peter Briggs (England) Gregory Mairs	20–22, 18–21	(silver) Runner-up
2021	Dutch Open	(Singapore) Terry Hee	(Malaysia) Tan Kian Meng (Malaysia) Tan Wee Kiong	21–14, 18–21, 22–20	(gold) Winner
2021	Czech Open	(Singapore) Terry Hee	(Malaysia) Man Wei Chong (Malaysia) Tee Kai Wun	13–21, 21–15, 21–15	(gold) Winner
2024	Estonian International	(Singapore) Nicholas Low	(Bulgaria) Ivan Rusev (Bulgaria) Iliyan Stoynov	21–18, 21–8	(gold) Winner

Mixed doubles
Year	Tournament	Partner	Opponent	Score	Result
2014	Singapore International	(Singapore) Dellis Yuliana	(Singapore) Terry Hee (Singapore) Tan Wei Han	19–21, 21–19, 14–21	(silver) Runner-up

BWF International Challenge tournament
BWF International Series tournament
BWF Future Series tournament
