= Khosit Phetpradab =

Thai badminton player (born 1994)

Khosit Phetpradab โฆษิต เพชรประดับ
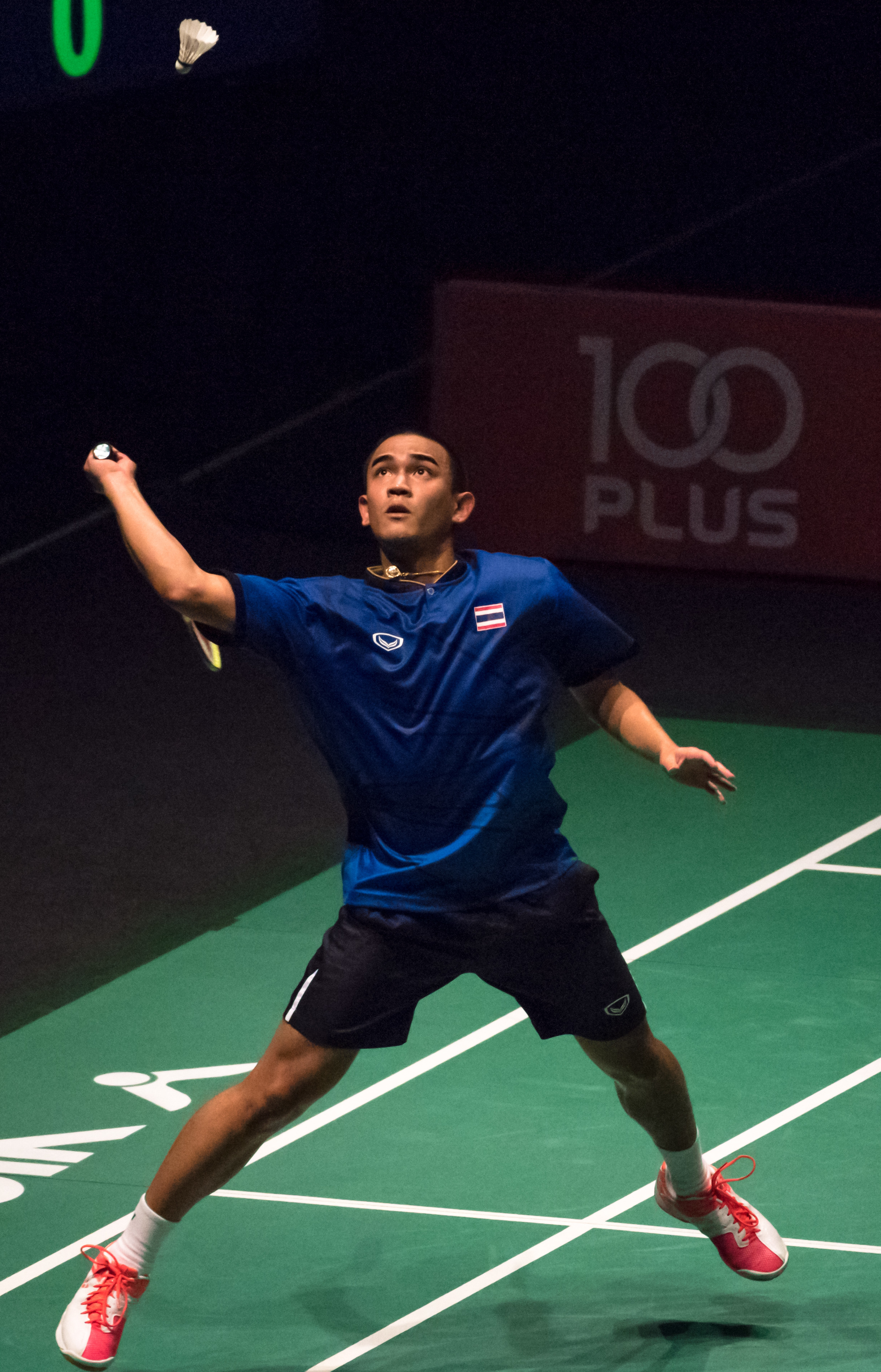
- Phetpradab in 2017

Personal information
- Born: 8 July 1994 (age 32) Ratchaburi, Thailand
- Height: 1.68 m (5 ft 6 in)
- Weight: 65 kg (143 lb)

Sport
- Country: Thailand
- Sport: Badminton
- Handedness: Right

Men's singles
- Career record: 169 wins, 134 losses
- Highest ranking: 15 (22 January 2019)
- BWF profile
Medal record
Men's badminton
Representing Thailand
Sudirman Cup
Bronze medal – third place	2017 Gold Coast	Mixed team
Asia Mixed Team Championships
Bronze medal – third place	2017 Ho Chi Minh	Mixed team
SEA Games
Gold medal – first place	2021 Vietnam	Men's team
Silver medal – second place	2015 Singapore	Men's team
Silver medal – second place	2017 Kuala Lumpur	Men's singles
Bronze medal – third place	2017 Kuala Lumpur	Men's team
Bronze medal – third place	2019 Philippines	Men's team

Khosit Phetpradab (Thai: โฆษิต เพชรประดับ; born 8 July 1994) is a Thai badminton player.

== Achievements ==
=== SEA Games ===
Men's singles
Year	Venue	Opponent	Score	Result
2017	Axiata Arena; Kuala Lumpur, Malaysia	(Indonesia) Jonatan Christie	19–21, 10–21	Silver

=== BWF World Tour (1 runner-up) ===
The BWF World Tour, which was announced on 19 March 2017 and implemented in 2018, is a series of elite badminton tournaments sanctioned by the Badminton World Federation (BWF). The BWF World Tours are divided into levels of World Tour Finals, Super 1000, Super 750, Super 500, Super 300 (part of the HSBC World Tour), and the BWF Tour Super 100.

Men's singles
Year	Tournament	Level	Opponent	Score	Result
2018	Japan Open	Super 750	(Japan) Kento Momota	14–21, 11–21	(silver) Runner-up

=== BWF Grand Prix (1 title) ===
The BWF Grand Prix had two levels, the Grand Prix and Grand Prix Gold. It was a series of badminton tournaments sanctioned by the Badminton World Federation (BWF) and played between 2007 and 2017.

Men's singles
Year	Tournament	Opponent	Score	Result
2017	Vietnam Open	(Thailand) Suppanyu Avihingsanon	21–15, 21–19	(gold) Winner

BWF Grand Prix Gold tournament
BWF Grand Prix tournament

=== BWF International Challenge/Series (2 titles, 2 runners-up) ===
Men's singles
Year	Tournament	Opponent	Score	Result
2014	Smiling Fish International	(Indonesia) Andre Marteen	21–14, 19–21, 21–13	(gold) Winner
2015	Vietnam International	(Indonesia) Firman Abdul Kholik	22–20, 14–21, 18–21	(silver) Runner-up
2015	Malaysia International	(Malaysia) Soong Joo Ven	21–14, 21–10	(gold) Winner
2017	Vietnam International	(Vietnam) Nguyễn Tiến Minh	14–21, 17–21	(silver) Runner-up

BWF International Challenge tournament
BWF International Series tournament
