= Kanison Phoopun =

Thai futsal player

Personal information
- Full name: Kanison Phoopun
- Date of birth: 11 November 1991 (age 34)
- Place of birth: Samut Songkhram, Thailand
- Height: 1.75 m (5 ft 9 in)
- Position: Goalkeeper

Team information
- Current team: Port Futsal Club

Youth career
- 2004–2009: Satthasamut School

Senior career*
Years	Team	Apps	(Gls)
2010–	Port Futsal Club	116	(5)

International career
2014–	Thailand Futsal	24	(0)
- * Club domestic league appearances and goals

Kanison Phoopun (Thai: คณิศร ภู่พันธ์), is a Thai futsal goalkeeper, and a member of Thailand national futsal team. He plays for Port Futsal Club in Futsal Thailand League.
