= Tennis at the 2017 SEA Games =

- Venue: National Tennis Centre
- Dates: 21 August 2017 to 26 August 2017
- Competitors: 71 from 9 nations

Tennis at the 2017 SEA Games was held in the National Tennis Centre, Jalan Duta from 21 to 26 August 2017.

== Participating nations ==
A total of 71 athletes from nine nations competed in tennis at the 2017 Southeast Asian Games:

- Cambodia (8)
- Indonesia (10)
- Laos (4)
- Malaysia (10)
- Myanmar (6)
- Philippines (8)
- Singapore (6)
- Thailand (10)
- Vietnam (9)

== Competition schedule ==
Tennis events at the 2017 SEA Games were held from 21 to 26 August 2017.

== Medalists ==
Event	Gold	Silver	Bronze
Men's singles	Christopher Rungkat; Indonesia	Jirat Navasirisomboon; Thailand	Lý Hoàng Nam; Vietnam
Men's singles	Christopher Rungkat; Indonesia	Jirat Navasirisomboon; Thailand	Wishaya Trongcharoenchaikul; Thailand
Men's doubles	Thailand (THA); Sanchai Ratiwatana; Sonchat Ratiwatana	Philippines (PHI); Francis Casey Alcantara; Ruben Gonzales	Vietnam (VIE); Lý Hoàng Nam; Nguyễn Hoàng Thiên
Men's doubles	Thailand (THA); Sanchai Ratiwatana; Sonchat Ratiwatana	Philippines (PHI); Francis Casey Alcantara; Ruben Gonzales	Thailand (THA); Kittipong Wachiramanowong; Wishaya Trongcharoenchaikul
Women's singles	Luksika Kumkhum; Thailand	Anna Clarice Patrimonio; Philippines	Stefanie Tan; Singapore
Women's singles	Luksika Kumkhum; Thailand	Anna Clarice Patrimonio; Philippines	Andrea Ka; Cambodia
Women's doubles	Thailand (THA); Nicha Lertpitaksinchai; Peangtarn Plipuech	Thailand (THA); Luksika Kumkhum; Noppawan Lertcheewakarn	Malaysia (MAS); Jawairiah Noordin; Theiviya Selvarajoo
Women's doubles	Thailand (THA); Nicha Lertpitaksinchai; Peangtarn Plipuech	Thailand (THA); Luksika Kumkhum; Noppawan Lertcheewakarn	Philippines (PHI); Denise Dy; Katharina Lehnert
Mixed doubles	Thailand (THA); Nicha Lertpitaksinchai; Sanchai Ratiwatana	Indonesia (INA); Jessy Rompies; Christopher Rungkat	Thailand (THA); Peangtarn Plipuech; Sonchat Ratiwatana
Mixed doubles	Thailand (THA); Nicha Lertpitaksinchai; Sanchai Ratiwatana	Indonesia (INA); Jessy Rompies; Christopher Rungkat	Philippines (PHI); Denise Dy; Ruben Gonzales

== Medal table ==
* Host nation (Malaysia)

Rank	Nation	Gold	Silver	Bronze	Total
1	Thailand	4	2	3	9
2	Indonesia	1	1	0	2
3	Philippines	0	2	2	4
4	Vietnam	0	0	2	2
5	Cambodia	0	0	1	1
5	Malaysia*	0	0	1	1
5	Singapore	0	0	1	1
Totals (7 entries)		5	5	10	20

== See also ==
- Wheelchair tennis at the 2017 ASEAN Para Games
