= Philippines at the 2017 SEA Games =

Philippines at the 2017 Southeast Asian Games
- IOC code: PHI
- NOC: Philippine Olympic Committee
- Website: www.olympic.ph (in English)

in Malaysia
- Competitors: 497 in 37 sports
- Flag bearer: Kirstie Elaine Alora
- Officials: 163
- Medals Ranked 6th: Gold 23 Silver 33 Bronze 63 Total 119

Southeast Asian Games appearances (overview)
- 1977; 1979; 1981; 1983; 1985; 1987; 1989; 1991; 1993; 1995; 1997; 1999; 2001; 2003; 2005; 2007; 2009; 2011; 2013; 2015; 2017; 2019; 2021; 2023; 2025; 2027; 2029

The Philippines competed at the 29th Southeast Asian Games which took place in Malaysia from 19 to 30 August 2017. The Philippines contingent was composed of 497 athletes, 163 sporting officials and 70 administrative and medical staff who competed in 37 out of the 38 sports. The Philippines finished the 29th SEA Games in 6th place with a medal haul of 23 Golds, 33 Silvers and 64 Bronze which is the country's worst finish in 18 years. The next edition of the Southeast Asian Games was hosted by the Philippines in 2019.

== Preparations ==
A task force was created on December 21, 2016, composing of officials from the Philippine Sports Commission (PSC) and the Philippine Olympic Committee (POC) as part of the preparations of the Philippine delegate to the 2017 SEA Games. On December 23, 2016, they submitted the list of athletes by numbers to the SEA Games organizing committee. A list composes a total of 535 athletes from 31 sports. The task force has set a target of 1 gold medal for each sport.

The PSC has stated that they are not keen on sending athletes it deems undeserving for the regional games for the sake of sending a "bloated" delegation. An evaluation and screening will be conducted by the task force to trim the size of the delegation and the task force is open to sending just 200 to 250 athletes. No futsal or cricket team will be sent, the latter because there is no POC-recognized NSA for cricket yet.

The task force released the criteria for the selection of participating athletes on December 22, 2016. Performance in the 2015 Southeast Asian Games, and other International competitions are a big part of the criteria. On the same day, participants at the 2016 Summer Olympics, and medalists at the 2014 Asian Games are already seeded a place in the 2017 SEA Games Philippine delegation by the task force but maintained that they have to be active and competitive.

Cynthia Carrion of gymnastics was appointed as the chef de mission of the Philippine delegate to the games on January 20, 2017.

The POC released initial number of athletes and officials that will form the Philippine SEA Games delegation on May 25, 2017. On the same day it was reported that the line up of athletes is 85-90 percent complete except for players in indoor hockey and volleyball. The "tentative" delegation is composed of 493 athletes set to compete in 37 out of 38 sports and 149 officials. By June 3, 2017, this figure was revised to 542 athletes set to compete in all 38 sports and 100 officials.

POC President Peping Cojuangco signed the final list of athletes on June 28, 2017. The delegation is composed of 497 athletes, as well as 163 coaches, and 70 administrative and medical personnel. The country will compete in all 38 sports except cricket.

== Medalists ==
Medalists are entitled to incentive from the government through the Philippine Sports Commission per R.A. 10699.

=== Gold ===
No.	Medal	Name	Sport	Event	Date
1	Gold	Mary Joy Tabal	Athletics	Women's Marathon	19 August
2	Gold	Nikko Bryan Huelgas	Triathlon	Men's Triathlon	21 August
3	Gold	Kim Mangrobang	Triathlon	Women's Triathlon	21 August
4	Gold	Kaitlin De Guzman	Gymnastics	Uneven Bars	22 August
5	Gold	Reyland Capellan	Gymnastics	Men's Artistic Floor Exercise	22 August
6	Gold	Agatha Chrystenzen Wong	Wushu	Women's taijiquan	22 August
7	Gold	Brennan Wayne Louie	Fencing	Men's Foil	22 August
8	Gold	Eric Shauwn Cray	Athletics	Men's 400m hurdles	22 August
9	Gold	Aries Toledo	Athletics	Men's Decathlon	23 August
10	Gold	Trenten Anthony Beram	Athletics	Men's 200m	23 August
11	Gold	Curte Guarin; Emmanuel Portacio; Leoncio Carreon Jr. Ronald Lising	Lawn Bowls	Men's fours	24 August
12	Gold	Eumir Felix Marcial	Boxing	Men's Middleweight	24 August
13	Gold	John Marvin	Boxing	Men's Light Heavyweight	24 August
14	Gold	Benjamin Imperial; Paul Sanchez; Jose Cadiz; Javier Cadiz; Francois Gautier; Steven Fuglister; Carl Montano; Carlo Tenedero; Gianpietro Issepi; Daniel Pastrana; Paolo Spafford; Patrick Syquiatco; Julius Santiago; Joshua Carino; Jan Regencia; Jorell Crisostomo; Lenard Lancero; Georgino Orda; Hector Navasero; Miguel Serrano	Ice hockey	Men's team	24 August
15	Gold	Trenten Anthony Beram	Athletics	Men's 400m	24 August
16	Gold	Dustin Jacob Mella; Raphael Enrico Mella; Rodolfo Reyes Jr.	Taekwondo	Men's team poomsae	26 August
17	Gold	Kiyomi Watanabe	Judo	Women's 63kg	26 August
18	Gold	Mike Tolomia; Von Pessumal; Kevin Ferrer; Carl Bryan Cruz; Troy Rosario; Almond Vosotros; Raymar Jose; Baser Amer; Bobby Ray Parks Jr. Kiefer Ravena; Kobe Paras; Christian Standhardinger	Basketball	Men's team	26 August
19	Gold	Chezka Centeno	Billiards	Women's 9-Ball	27 August
20	Gold	Samuel Morrison	Taekwondo	Men's Lightweight 74kg	27 August
21	Gold	Mariya Takahashi	Judo	Women's 70kg	27 August
22	Gold	Carlo Biado	Billiards	Men's 9 Ball Singles	27 August
23	Gold	Dines Dumaan	Pencak Silat	Men's Tanding (Match) Class A 45-50kg	29 August
–	Gold (DQ)	Colin John Syquia	Equestrian	Men's individual Jumping	28 August

=== Silver ===
No.	Medal	Name	Sport	Event	Date
1	Silver	John J. Morcillos; John Bobier; Rhemwil Catana; Ronsited Gabayeron; Joeart Jumawan; Alvin Pangan; Emmanuel Escote; Regie R. Pabriga	Sepak Takraw	Chinlone – linking	16 August
2	Silver	Nicole Marie Tagle	Archery	Women's individual recurve	20 August
3	Silver	John Leerams Chicano	Triathlon	Men's Triathlon	21 August
4	Silver	Maria Claire Adorna	Triathlon	Women's Triathlon	21 August
5	Silver	Agatha Chrystenzen Wong	Wushu	Women's taijijian	21 August
6	Silver	Samantha Catantan	Fencing	Women's Foil	21 August
7	Silver	Hanniel Abella	Fencing	Women's Épée	22 August
8	Silver	Nathaniel Perez	Fencing	Men's Foil	22 August
9	Silver	Jayson Ramil Macaalay	Karate	Men's kumite -60kg	22 August
10	Silver	Rexor Tacay	Karate	Men's kumite -67kg	22 August
11	Silver	Eric Shauwn Cray	Athletics	Men's 100m	22 August
12	Silver	Kaitlin De Guzman	Gymnastics	Women's Artistic Floor Exercise	23 August
13	Silver	John Paul Bejar	Karate	Men's kumite -55kg	23 August
14	Silver	Marco Vilog	Athletics	Men's 800m	23 August
15	Silver	Mark Harry Diones	Athletics	Men's triple jump	23 August
16	Silver	Jasmine Alkhaldi; Nicole Justine Marie Oliva; Nicole Meah Pamintuan; Rosalee Mira Santa Ana	Swimming	Women's 4 × 200 m freestyle relay	23 August
17	Silver	Mario Fernandez	Boxing	Men's Bantamweight	24 August
18	Silver	Marisa Baronda; Nancy Toyco; Nenita Tabiano; Sharon Hauters	Lawn Bowls	Women's fours	24 August
19	Silver	Jemyca Aribado; Yvonne Alyssa Dalida	Squash	Women's Jumbo Doubles	24 August
20	Silver	Francis Casey Alcantara; Ruben Gonzales Jr.	Tennis	Men's doubles	25 August
21	Silver	Vilma Greenlees; Rosita Bradborn; Hazel Jagonoy	Lawn Bowls	Women's triples	25 August
22	Silver	James Deiparine	Swimming	Men's 100m breaststroke	25 August
23	Silver	Angelo Morales; Pancho Marcelito	Lawn Bowls	Men's pairs	26 August
24	Silver	Anna Clarice Patrimonio	Tennis	Women's singles	26 August
25	Silver	James Deiparine	Swimming	Men's 50m breaststroke	26 August
26	Silver	Rubilen Amit	Billiards	Women's 9-Ball	27 August
27	Silver	Michael Christian Martinez	Figure skating	Men's singles	27 August
28	Silver	Arven Alcantara	Taekwondo	Men's Kyorugi 68kg	27 August
29	Silver	Aragon Rhezie Canama	Taekwondo	Women's Bantamweight 53kg	28 August
30	Silver	Geylord Coveta	Sailing	Men's windsurfing RS One	28 August
31	Silver	Kirstie Elaine Alora	Taekwondo	Women's Middleweight 73kg	29 August
32	Silver	Reymark Begornia; Robert Andrew Garcia; David William Pelino; Juan Rafael Yam	Squash	Men's team	29 August
33	Silver	Jason Huerte; Mark Joseph Gonzales; Ortouste Rheyjey Cabogoy; Rhemwil Catana; Ronsited Gabayeron	Sepak Takraw	Men's regu	29 August

=== Bronze ===
No.	Medal	Name	Sport	Event	Date
1	Bronze	Paul Marton Dela Cruz	Archery	Men's individual compound	16 August
2	Bronze	Earl Benjamin Yap; Joseph Vicencio; Paul Marton Dela Cruz	Archery	Men's team compound	17 August
3	Bronze	Kristel Carloman; Lhaina Lhiell Mangubat; Mary Ann Lopez; Rizzalyn Amolacion; Jean Marie Sucalit	Sepak Takraw	Women's regu	21 August
4	Bronze	Florante Matan; Luis Gabriel Moreno; Mark Javier	Archery	Men's team recurve	21 August
5	Bronze	Kareel Meer Hongitan; Mary Queen Ybañez; Nicole Marie Tagle	Archery	Women's team recurve	21 August
6	Bronze	Maxine Isabel Esteban	Fencing	Women's Foil	21 August
7	Bronze	Harlene Raguin	Fencing	Women's Épée	22 August
8	Bronze	James Delos Santos	Karate	Men's kata individual	22 August
9	Bronze	Junna Tsukii	Karate	Women's kumite -50kg	22 August
10	Bronze	Roxanne Ashley Yu	Swimming	Women's 200m backstroke	22 August
11	Bronze	Richard Gonzales	Table tennis	Men's singles	22 August
12	Bronze	Evalyn Palabrica	Athletics	Women's javelin throw	22 August
13	Bronze	Reyland Capellan	Gymnastics	Men's vault	23 August
14	Bronze	Kaitlin De Guzman	Gymnastics	Artistic Balance Beam	23 August
15	Bronze	Arniel Ferrera	Athletics	Men's hammer throw	23 August
16	Bronze	Mae Soriano	Karate	Women's kumite -55kg	23 August
17	Bronze	Jasmine Alkhaldi	Swimming	Women's 100m freestyle	23 August
18	Bronze	Jasmine Alkhaldi	Swimming	Women's 50m butterfly	23 August
19	Bronze	Jemyca Aribado; Yvonne Alyssa Dalida	Squash	Women's doubles	23 August
20	Bronze	Robert Andrew Garcia; Jemyca Aribado	Squash	Mixed doubles	24 August
21	Bronze	Lois Kaye Go	Golf	Women's individual	24 August
22	Bronze	Amparo Teresa Acuña	Shooting	Women's 50m Rifle	24 August
23	Bronze	Ian Clark Bautista	Boxing	Men's Flyweight	24 August
24	Bronze	Dyan Arcel Coronacion; Krizziah Lyn Tabora; Maria Liza Del Rosario; Maria Lourdes Arles; Marian Lara Posadas; Marie Alexis Sy	Bowling	Women's team of Five	24 August
25	Bronze	Charly Suarez	Boxing	Men's Light Welterweight	24 August
26	Bronze	Mervin Guarte	Athletics	Men's 1500m	24 August
27	Bronze	Erica Celine Samonte; Junna Tsukii; Kimverly Madrona; Mae Soriano	Karate	Women's kumite Team	24 August
28	Bronze	David William Pellino; Robert Andrew Garcia	Squash	Men's Jumbo Doubles	24 August
29	Bronze	Janry Ubas	Athletics	Men's long jump	24 August
30	Bronze	Dennis Orcollo; Warren Kiamco	Billiards	Men's 9 Ball Doubles	24 August
31	Bronze	Denise Dy; Katharina Melissa Lenhert	Tennis	Women's doubles	25 August
32	Bronze	Anfernee Lopena; Archand Christian Bagsit; Eric Shauwn Cray; Trenten Anthony Beram	Athletics	Men's 4 × 100 m Relay	25 August
33	Bronze	Kayla Richardson; Kyla Richarson; Zion Nelson; Eloiza Luzon	Athletics	Women's 4 × 100 m Relay	25 August
34	Bronze	Melvin Calano	Athletics	Men's javelin throw	25 August
35	Bronze	Marestella Torres Sunang	Athletics	Women's long jump	25 August
36	Bronze	Denise Dy; Ruben Gonzales Jr.	Tennis	Mixed doubles	26 August
37	Bronze	Mark Griffin	Water Skiing	Men's individual Wakeboarding	26 August
38	Bronze	Rodolfo Reyes Jr.	Taekwondo	Men's individual poomsae	26 August
39	Bronze	Jasmine Alkhaldi	Swimming	Women's 200m freestyle	26 August
40	Bronze	Daniel Caluag	Cycling	Men's BMX	26 August
41	Bronze	Clinton Kingsley Bautista	Athletics	Men's 110m hurdles	26 August
42	Bronze	Shugen Nakano	Judo	Men's Judo 66kg	26 August
43	Bronze	Keisei Nakano	Judo	Men's Judo 73 kg	26 August
44	Bronze	Sonia Bruce; Ainie Knight	Lawn Bowls	Women's pairs	26 August
45	Bronze	Rina Babanto; Juvenile Faye Crisostomo; Jocel Lyn Ninobla	Taekwondo	Women's team poomsae	26 August
46	Bronze	Edgardo Alejan, Jr. Michael Carlo del Prado; Archand Christian Bagsit; Aries Toledo	Athletics	Men's 4 × 400 m Relay	26 August
47	Bronze	Elmer Abatayo	Lawn bowls	Men's singles	27 August
48	Bronze	Lester Troy Tayong; Emerson Villena	Sailing	Men's international 470	27 August
49	Bronze	Rheyjay Ortuoste; Jason Huerte	Sepak takraw	Men's doubles	27 August
50	Bronze	Sydney Sy Tancontian	Judo	Women's 78kg	27 August
51	Bronze	AJ Melgar; Jean Caluscusin; Katrina Drilon Loretizo; Marian Nicolle Medina; Shieldannah Sabio	Gymnastics	Rhythmic 5 Hoops	27 August
52	Bronze	Alisson Perticheto	Figure skating	Women's singles	27 August
53	Bronze	Pauline Louise Lopez	Taekwondo	Women's Lightweight 62kg	27 August
54	Bronze	Johann Chua	Billiards	Men's 9 Ball Singles	27 August
55	Bronze	Robert Andrew Garcia	Squash	Men's singles	28 August
56	Bronze	Jemyca Aribado	Squash	Women's singles	28 August
57	Bronze	Princesslyn Enopia	Pencak Silat	Women's Tanding (Match) Class A 45-50kg	29 August
58	Bronze	Jefferson Rhey Loon	Pencak Silat	Men's Tanding (Match) Class D 60-65kg	29 August
59	Bronze	Rick-Rod Ortega	Pencak Silat	Men's Tanding (Match) Class C 55-60kg	29 August
60	Bronze	Juryll Del Rosario	Pencak Silat	Men's Tanding (Match) Class I 85-90kg	29 August
61	Bronze	Ryan Jakiri	Muay Thai	Men's 63.5kg	29 August
62	Bronze	Francis Aaron Agojo	Taekwondo	Men's Bantamweight 63kg	29 August
63	Bronze	Isabelle Gotuaco; Jemyca Aribado; Joan Arebado; Yvonne Alyssa Dalida	Squash	Women's team	29 August

=== Multiple medalists ===
Name	Sport	1st place, gold medalist(s)	2nd place, silver medalist(s)	3rd place, bronze medalist(s)	Total
Trenten Anthony Beram	Athletics	2	0	1	3
Kaitlin De Guzman	Gymnastics	1	1	1	3
Eric Shauwn Cray	Athletics	1	1	1	3
Agatha Chrystenzen Wong	Wushu	1	1	0	2
Aries Toledo	Athletics	1	0	1	2
Reyland Capellan	Gymnastics	1	0	1	2
James Deiparine	Swimming	0	2	0	2
Jemyca Aribado	Squash	0	1	4	5
Robert Andrew Garcia	Squash	0	1	3	4
Yvonne Alyssa Dali	Squash	0	1	2	3
Nicole Marie Tagle	Archery	0	1	1	2
Ruen Gonzales Jr.	Tennis	0	1	1	2
Jasmine Alkhaldi	Swimming	0	0	4	4
Archand Christian Bagsit	Athletics	0	0	2	2
Paul Marton Dela Cruz	Archery	0	0	2	2
Denise Dy	Tennis	0	0	2	2

== Medal summary ==
=== By sports ===
Sport	1st place, gold medalist(s)	2nd place, silver medalist(s)	3rd place, bronze medalist(s)	Total
Aquatic Swimming	0	3	4	7
Archery	0	1	4	5
Athletics	5	3	10	18
Basketball	1	0	0	1
Billiards and snooker	2	1	2	5
Bowling	0	0	1	1
Boxing	2	1	2	5
Cycling	0	0	1	1
Equestrian	0	1	0	1
Figure skating	0	1	1	2
Fencing	1	3	2	6
Golf	0	0	1	1
Gymnastics	2	1	3	6
Ice hockey	1	0	0	1
Judo	2	0	3	5
Karate	0	3	4	7
Lawn Bowls	1	3	2	6
Muaythai	0	0	1	1
Pencak Silat	1	0	4	5
Sailing	0	1	1	2
Sepak Takraw	0	2	2	4
Shooting	0	0	1	1
Squash	0	2	6	8
Table tennis	0	0	1	1
Taekwondo	2	3	4	9
Tennis	0	2	2	4
Triathlon	2	2	0	4
Waterskiing	0	0	1	1
Wushu	1	1	0	2
Total	24	34	63	121

=== By date ===
Day	Date	1st place, gold medalist(s)	2nd place, silver medalist(s)	3rd place, bronze medalist(s)	Total
–3	16 August	0	1	1	2
–2	17 August	0	0	1	1
–1	18 August	0	0	0	0
0	19 August	1	0	0	1
1	20 August	0	1	0	1
2	21 August	2	4	4	10
3	22 August	5	5	6	16
4	23 August	2	5	6	14
5	24 August	5	3	11	19
6	25 August	0	3	5	8
7	26 August	3	4	11	18
8	27 August	4	3	8	15
9	28 August	0	2	2	4
10	29 August	1	3	7	11
11	30 August	0	0	0	0
Total		23	34	63	120

== Archery ==
=== Men's compound ===
Athlete	Event	Ranking Round		Round of 16	Quarterfinals	Semifinals	Final/BM	Rank
Athlete	Event	Score	Seed	Opposition Score	Opposition Score	Opposition Score	Opposition Score	Rank
Paul Marton dela Cruz	Individual	702	2 Q	Shein Htet Kyaw (MYA); W 145 – 140	Yoke Rizaldi Akbar (INA); W 144 – 139	Mohd Juwaidi Mazuki (MAS); L 140 – 147	Zulfadhli Ruslan (MAS); W 144 – 144; 10 – 9	3rd place, bronze medalist(s)
Earl Benjamin Yap	Individual	694	7 Q	Ang Han Teng (SIN); L 142 – 144	Did Not Advance			
Joseph Benjamin Vicencio	Individual	689	13	Did Not Advance				
Niron Brylle Concepcion	Individual	661	28	Did Not Advance				
Paul Marton dela Cruz; Earl Benjamin Yap; Joseph Benjamin Vicencio	Team	2085	2	—N/a	Myanmar; W 236 – 214	Singapore; L 227 – 233	Vietnam; W 233 – 230	3rd place, bronze medalist(s)
Paul Marton dela Cruz; Amaya Amparo Cojuangco	Mixed	2085	2	—N/a	Laos; W 156 – 150	Myanmar; L 154 – 154; 18 – 18*	Vietnam; L 155 – 159	4

=== Women's compound ===
Athlete	Event	Ranking Round		Round of 16	Quarterfinals	Semifinals	Final/BM	Rank
Athlete	Event	Score	Seed	Opposition Score	Opposition Score	Opposition Score	Opposition Score	Rank
Amaya Amparo Cojuangco	Individual	695	3 Q	Madeleine Ong Xue Li (SIN); W 142 – 132	Dellie Threesyadinda (INA); L 137 – 141	Did Not Advance		
Jennifer Chan	Individual	674	14 Q	Sri Ranti (INA); L 136 – 141	Did Not Advance			
Abbigail Tindugan	Individual	661	22	Did Not Advance				
Kim Concepcion	Individual	638	27	Did Not Advance				
Amaya Amparo Cojuangco; Jennifer Chan; Abbigail Tindugan	Team	2085	2	—N/a	Myanmar; L 215 – 222	Did Not Advance		

=== Men's recurve ===
Athlete	Event	Ranking Round		Round of 16	Quarterfinals	Semifinals	Final/BM	Rank
Athlete	Event	Score	Seed	Opposition Score	Opposition Score	Opposition Score	Opposition Score	Rank
Florante Matan	Individual	641	9 Q	Van Duy Nguyen (VIE); W 6 – 4	Khairul Anuar Mohamad (MAS); L 2 – 6	Did Not Advance		
Luis Gabriel Moreno	Individual	639	10 Q	Natthapoom Phusawat (THA); W 6 – 0	Akmal Nor Hasrin (MAS); L 3 – 7	Did Not Advance		
Florante Matan; Luis Gabriel Moreno; Mark Javier	Team	1914	4	—N/a	Indonesia; W 5 – 3	Malaysia; L 0 – 6	Vietnam; W 6 – 0	3rd place, bronze medalist(s)
Florante Matan; Nicole Marie Tagle	Mixed	1284	4	—N/a	Thailand; W 5 – 3	Myanmar; L 4 – 5	Vietnam; L 2 – 6	4

=== Women's recurve ===
Athlete	Event	Ranking Round		Round of 16	Quarterfinals	Semifinals	Final/BM	Rank
Athlete	Event	Score	Seed	Opposition Score	Opposition Score	Opposition Score	Opposition Score	Rank
Nicole Marie Tagle	Individual	643	2 Q	Bye	Lok Thi Dao (VIE); W 6 – 2	Nwe Thida (MYA); W 6 – 2	Diananda Choirunisa (SIN); L 4 – 6	2nd place, silver medalist(s)
Kareel Meer Hongitan	Individual	623	8 Q	Waraporn Phutdee (THA); L 2 – 6	Did Not Advance			
Nicole Marie Tagle; Kareel Meer Hongitan; Mary Queen Ybañez	Team	1867	4	—N/a	Myanmar; W 5 – 4	Indonesia; L 2 – 6	Vietnam; W 6 – 0	3rd place, bronze medalist(s)

== Athletics ==
=== Men's ===
Athlete	Event	Heats			Final	
Athlete	Event	Heat	Time	Rank	Time	Rank
Jeson Agravante	Marathon	—N/a			Did Not Finish	
Eric Shauwn Cray	100 m	1	10.58	1 Q	10.43	2nd place, silver medalist(s)
Eric Shauwn Cray	400 mH	1	52.60	2 Q	50.03	1st place, gold medalist(s)
Francis Medina	400 mH	2	51.48	1 Q	Did Not Finish	
Marco Vilog	800 m	1	1:53.28	2 Q	1:49.91	2nd place, silver medalist(s)
Mervin Guarte	800 m	2	1:55.19	2 Q	1:51.33	4
Mervin Guarte	1500 m	—N/a			3:53.68	3rd place, bronze medalist(s)
Elbren Neri	1500 m	—N/a			3:58.38	7
Archand Christian Bagsit	200 m	1	21.50	4 q	21.74	7
Trenten Anthony Beram	200 m	2	20.99	1 Q	20.84	1st place, gold medalist(s)
Trenten Anthony Beram	400 m	1	47.16	1 Q	46.39	1st place, gold medalist(s)
Edgardo Alejan Jr.	400 m	2	47.708	4 q	47.68	7
Anfernee Lopena; Archand Christian Bagsit; Eric Shauwn Cray; Trenten Anthony Beram	4 × 100 m	—N/a			39.11	3rd place, bronze medalist(s)
Clinton Kingsley Bautista	110 mH	—N/a			14.15	3rd place, bronze medalist(s)
Christopher Ulboc Jr.	3000m Steeplechase	—N/a			9:24.75	5
Immuel Candole Camino	3000m Steeplechase	—N/a			9:36.40	7
Aries Toledo; Archand Christian Bagsit; Edgardo Alejan Jr. Michael Carlo Del Prado	4 × 100 m	—N/a			3:08.42	3rd place, bronze medalist(s)

Athlete	Event	Final	
Athlete	Event	Result	Rank
Melvin Calano	Javelin Throw	65.94	3rd place, bronze medalist(s)
Kenny Gonzales	Javelin Throw	60.69	6
Arniel Ferrera	Hammer Throw	55.94	3rd place, bronze medalist(s)
Mark Harry Diones	Javelin Throw	16.63	2nd place, silver medalist(s)
Ronnie Malipay	Javelin Throw	16.18	4
Ernest John Obiena	Pole Vault	Did Not Start	
Tyler Christian Ruiz	Long Jump	6.41	10
Janry Ubas	Long Jump	7.75	3rd place, bronze medalist(s)
Lasangue Manuel Tacleo Jr.	High Jump	2.04	7

Athlete	Event	100m	LJ	SP	HJ	400 m	110m H	DT	PV	JV	1500m	Total	Rank
Aries Toledo	Decathlon	10.95; 872	7.33; 893	11.63; 584	1.91; 723	48.13; 903	14.95; 856	37.85; 621	4.20; 673	52.55; 626	4:39.80; 682	7433	1st place, gold medalist(s)

=== Women's ===
Athlete	Event	Heats			Final	
Athlete	Event	Heat	Time	Rank	Time	Rank
Mary Joy Tabal	Marathon	—N/a			2:48:26	1st place, gold medalist(s)
Zion Rose Nelson	100 m	1	11.88	5 q	12.01	8
Kayla Anise Richardson	100 m	Did Not Start				
Zion Rose Nelson	200 m	1	24.56	3 Q	24.26	4
Kayla Anise Richardson	200 m	2	24.57	2 Q	24.29	5
Eloisa Luzon; Kayla Anise Richardson; Kyla Ashley Richardson; Zion Corrales Nelson	4 × 100 m	—N/a			44.81	3rd place, bronze medalist(s)
Eloisa Luzon; Kayla Anise Richardson; Kyla Ashley Richardson; Zion Corrales Nelson	4 × 400 m	—N/a			Did Not Start	

Athlete	Event	Final	
Athlete	Event	Result	Rank
Marestella Sunang	Long Jump	6.45	3rd place, bronze medalist(s)
Katherine Khay Santos	Long Jump	6.18	5
Emily Jean Obiena	Pole Vault	3.40	5
Riezel Buenaventura	Pole Vault	3.40	6
Rhea Joy Sumalpong	Discus Throw	43.91	6

Athlete	Event	100m H	HJ	SP	200 m	LJ	JT	800m	Total	Rank
Narcisa Atienza	Heptathlon	15.55; 770	1.65; 795	11.97; 659	27.99; 632	0; 0	42.41; 714	DNS	3570	Did Not Finish

== Badminton ==
Athlete	Event	First Round	Round of 16	Quarter Final	Semi Final	Final	Rank
Athlete	Event	Opposition Result	Opposition Result	Opposition Result	Opposition Result	Opposition Result	Rank
Philip Joper Escueta; Carlos Antonie Cayanan	Men's doubles	Le Duc Phat (VIE); Tran Quoc Viet (SIN); W 21 – 13, 21 – 7	Soulisack Keopaserth (CAM); Vanhpasith Philavanh (CAM); W 21 – 16, 21 – 16	Ong Yew Sin (MAS); Teo Ee Yi (MAS); L 12 – 21, 6 – 21	Did Not Advance		
Peter Gabriel Magnaye; Alvin Morada	Men's doubles	Bye	Kittinupong Kedren (THA); Dechapol Puavaranukroh (THA); L 15 – 21, 21 – 15, 13 – 21	Did Not Advance			
Sarah Joy Barredo	Women's singles		Onlyone Phouangmala (LAO); W 21 – 7, 21 – 5	Pornpawee Chochuwong (THA); L 13 – 21, 6 – 21	Did Not Advance		
Sarah Joy Barredo; Alyssa Yasbel Leonardo	Women's doubles		Chua Hui Zhen Grace (SGP); Ker'Sara Koh (SGP) W 21 – 19, 18 – 21, 21 – 13	Dinh Thi Phuong Hong (VIE); Do Thi Hoai (VIE) L 11 – 21, 10 – 21	Did Not Advance		
Alyssa Yasbel Leonardo; Alvin Morada	Mixed doubles		Chan Win Oo (MYA); Ei Ei Chaw (MYA) W 21 – 10, 21 – 7	Sapsiree Taerattanachai (THA); Dechapol Puavaranukroh (THA) L 9 – 21, 17 – 21	Did Not Advance		

== Basketball ==
=== Men's ===
Team

Philippines men's national basketball team - 2017 Southeast Asian Games roster
Players
Coaches

Pos.	No.	Name	Age – Date of birth	Height	Club	Ctr.
G	13	Mike Tolomia	24 – January 6, 1993	1.83 m (6 ft 0 in)	Meralco Bolts	(Philippines)
G/F	19	Von Pessumal	24 – February 12, 1993	1.88 m (6 ft 2 in)	San Miguel Beermen	(Philippines)
F	14	Kevin Ferrer	24 – March 26, 1993	1.96 m (6 ft 5 in)	Barangay Ginebra San Miguel	(Philippines)
F	18	Carl Bryan Cruz	25 – August 21, 1991	1.93 m (6 ft 4 in)	Alaska Aces	(Philippines)
F	16	Troy Rosario	25 – January 20, 1992	2.01 m (6 ft 7 in)	TNT KaTropa	(Philippines)
G	9	Almond Vosotros	27 – January 26, 1990	1.78 m (5 ft 10 in)	Free agent	(Philippines)
F	8	Raymar Jose	25 – August 6, 1992	1.93 m (6 ft 4 in)	Cignal HD Hawkeyes	(Philippines)
G	7	Baser Amer	24 – September 29, 1992	1.83 m (6 ft 0 in)	Meralco Bolts	(Philippines)
G	3	Bobby Parks Jr.	24 – February 19, 1993	1.93 m (6 ft 4 in)	Alab Pilipinas	(Philippines)
G	1	Kiefer Ravena	23 – October 27, 1993	1.83 m (6 ft 0 in)	Alab Pilipinas	(Philippines)
G/F	6	Kobe Paras	19 – September 19, 1997	1.98 m (6 ft 6 in)	Cal State Northridge	(United States)
F	34	Christian Standhardinger (NP)	28 – July 4, 1989	2.01 m (6 ft 7 in)	Free agent

Head coach

- (Philippines) Jong Uichico

Assistant coaches

- (Philippines) Jimmy Alapag

Team manager

- To be announced

Legend

- (C) Team captain
- (NP) Naturalized Player
- Club – describes last
  club before the tournament
- Age – describes age
  on August 19, 2017

Results

Team	Preliminary round		Semifinal	Final	Rank
Team	Group A	Rank	Semifinal	Final	Rank
Philippines	Thailand; W 81 – 74	1	Singapore; W 68 – 60	Indonesia; W 94 - 55	1st place, gold medalist(s)
Philippines	Myanmar; W 129 – 34	1	Singapore; W 68 – 60	Indonesia; W 94 - 55	1st place, gold medalist(s)
Philippines	Malaysia; W 98 – 66	1	Singapore; W 68 – 60	Indonesia; W 94 - 55	1st place, gold medalist(s)

=== Women's ===
Team

Philippines women's national basketball team - 2017 Southeast Asian Games roster
Players
Coaches

Pos.	No.	Name	Age – Date of birth	Height	Club	Ctr.
F	3	Afril Bernardino	21 – 3 April 1996	1.72 m (5 ft 8 in)	National University	(Philippines)
G	6	France Mae Cabinbin	25 – 6 December 1991	1.52 m (5 ft 0 in)	Lyceum University	(Philippines)
F	8	Camille Sambile	25 – 24 April 1992	1.80 m (5 ft 11 in)	Far Eastern University	(Philippines)
F	9	Allana Lim	28 – 12 September 1988	1.75 m (5 ft 9 in)	Far Eastern University	(Philippines)
C	10	Jack Danielle Animam	18 – 27 November 1998	1.90 m (6 ft 3 in)	National University	(Philippines)
F	12	Cindy Resultay	26 – 31 December 1990	1.75 m (5 ft 9 in)	Air Force	(Philippines)
F	13	Araceli Abaca	23 – 5 January 1994	1.70 m (5 ft 7 in)	De La Salle University	(Philippines)
C	14	Analyn Almazan	28 – 7 October 1988	1.80 m (5 ft 11 in)	Adamson University	(Philippines)
G	15	Raiza Rose Dy	26 – 21 November 1990	1.67 m (5 ft 6 in)	Far Eastern University	(Philippines)
C	17	Clare Castro	20 – 13 January 1997	1.93 m (6 ft 4 in)	Far Eastern University	(Philippines)
G	18	Marizze Andrea Tongco	21 – 18 October 1995	1.52 m (5 ft 0 in)	National University	(Philippines)
G	22	Janine Pontejos	24 – 29 October 1992	1.65 m (5 ft 5 in)	University of the East	(Philippines)

Head coach

- (Philippines) Patrick Aquino

Assistant coach(es)

- (Philippines) Julie Amos

Legend

- Club – describes last
  club before the tournament
- Age – describes age
  on 19 August 2017

Results

Team	Game 1	Game 2	Game 3	Game 4	Game 5	Game 6	Rank
Philippines	Singapore; W 88 – 54	Indonesia; L 68 – 78	Myanmar; W 123 – 33	Thailand; W 69 – 67	Malaysia; L 56 – 60	Vietnam; W 116 – 44	4th

== Billiards and Snooker ==
=== Men's ===
Athlete	Event	Preliminary	Quarterfinals	Semifinals	Final	
Athlete	Event	Opposition Result	Opposition Result	Opposition Result	Opposition Result	Rank
Francisco Dela Cruz	Men's English Billiards	Jaka Kurniawan (INA); L 76 – 304	Did Not Advance			
Efren Reyes	Men's English Billiards	Tran Le Anh Tuan (VIE); W 300 – 118	Peter Gilchrist (SGP); L 138 – 301	Did Not Advance		
Carlo Biado	Men's 9-ball singles	Amnuayporn Chotipong (THA); W 9 – 3	Irsal Nasution (INA); W 9 – 8	Nguyễn Anh Tuấn (VIE); W 9 – 5	Duong Quoc Hoang (VIE); W 9 – 5	1st place, gold medalist(s)
Johann Chua	Men's 9-ball singles	Muhammad Almie (MAS); W 9 – 5	Muhammad Simanjuntak (INA); W 9 – 6	Duong Quoc Hoang (VIE); L 7 – 9	Did Not Advance	3rd place, bronze medalist(s)
Dennis Orcollo; Warren Kiamco	Men's 9-ball Doubles		Darryl Chia Soo Yew (MAS); Ibrahim bin Amir (MAS); W 9 – 6	Toh Lian Han (SGP); Aloysius Yapp (SGP); L 7 – 9	Did Not Advance	3rd place, bronze medalist(s)
Jefrey Roda	Men's Snooker singles	Minalavong Suriya (LAO); L 0 – 4	Did Not Advance			
Al-Shajjar Basil Hassan	Men's Snooker singles	Issara Kachaiwong (THA); L 1 – 4	Did Not Advance			
Alvin Barbero; Jefrey Roda	Men's snooker doubles		Aung Phyo (MYA); Ko Htet (MYA); L 0 – 3	Did Not Advance		

=== Women's ===
Athlete	Event	Preliminary	Quarterfinals	Semifinals	Final	
Athlete	Event	Opposition Result	Opposition Result	Opposition Result	Opposition Result	Rank
Rubilen Amit	Women's 9-ball Singles	Bye	Silviana Lu (INA); W 7 – 3	Suhana Dewi Sabtu (MAS); W 7 – 1	Chezka Centeno (PHI); L 6 – 7	2nd place, silver medalist(s)
Chezka Centeno	Women's 9-ball Singles	Bye	Angeline Magdalena Ticoalu (INA); W 7 – 4	Klaudia Djajalie (MAS); W 7 – 2	Rubilen Amit (PHI); W 7 – 6	1st place, gold medalist(s)

== Boxing ==
=== Men's ===
Athlete	Event	Round of 16	Quarterfinal	Semifinal	Final	Rank
Carlo Paalam	Light Flyweight	Bye	Muhammad Fuad Redzuan (MAS); L 0-5	Did not advance		
Ian Clark Bautista	Flyweight	Bye	Abdul Salam Kasim (MAS); W 5-0	Tanes Ongjunta (THA); L 0-5	Did not advance	3rd place, bronze medalist(s)
Mario Fernandez	Bantamweight	Maung Nge (MYA); W 5-0	Tran Phu Cuong (VIE); W 5-0	Nat Siek Nin (CAM); W 5-0	Chatchai Butdee (THA); L 0-4	2nd place, silver medalist(s)
Charly Suarez	Light Welterweight	Bye	Khir Akyazlan Bin Azmi (MAS); W 4-1	Wuttichai Masuk (THA); L 0-5	Did not advance	3rd place, bronze medalist(s)
Eumir Felix Marcial	Middleweight	Bye	Nguyen Manh Cuong (VIE); W 5-0	Indran Rama Krishnan (MAS); W RSC R 2	Pathomsak Kuttiya (THA); W 5-0	1st place, gold medalist(s)
John Marvin	Light Heavyweight	Bye	Felix Merlin Martinez (CAM); W 5-0	Anavat Thongkrathok (THA); W 5- 0	Adli Hafid Mohd Pauz (MAS); W RSC R 1	1st place, gold medalist(s)

== Bowling ==
=== Singles ===
Athlete	Event	Games 1–6						Total	Average	Grand Total	Rank
Athlete	Event	1	2	3	4	5	6	Total	Average	Grand Total	Rank
Anton Alcazaren	Men's singles	234	155	235	190	218	158	1190	198.33		25
Kenneth Chua	Men's singles	184	234	181	257	202	216	1274	212.33		16
Kevin Cu	Men's singles	172	207	196	247	195	168	1185	197.50		26
Jo-Mar Roland Jumapao	Men's singles	182	192	207	181	215	221	1198	199.67		24
John Macatula	Men's singles	174	181	189	210	201	202	1157	192.83		28
Merwin Tan	Men's singles	216	211	215	231	198	217	1288	214.67		12
Mardes Arles	Women's singles	132	192	168	174	181	185	1032	172.00		30
Dyan Coronacion	Women's singles	187	198	180	182	168	220	1135	189.17		23
Lara Posadas	Women's singles	172	192	215	233	228	212	1252	208.67		12
Liza Del Rosario	Women's singles	230	224	204	188	169	214	1229	204.83		15
Alexis Sy	Women's singles	140	246	212	192	160	170	1120	186.67		25
Krizziah Tabora	Women's singles	199	225	182	194	216	216	1232	205.33		14

=== Doubles ===
Athlete	Event	Games 1–6						Total	Average	Grand Total	Rank
Athlete	Event	1	2	3	4	5	6	Total	Average	Grand Total	Rank
Jo-Mar Juamapao; Kevin Cu	Men's doubles	215	196	214	190	224	202	1241	206.83	2485	5
Jo-Mar Juamapao; Kevin Cu	Men's doubles	197	203	215	215	214	200	1244	207.33	2485	5
Merwin Tan; Kenneth Chua	Men's doubles	210	201	219	190	248	178	1246	207.67	2484	7
Merwin Tan; Kenneth Chua	Men's doubles	215	202	212	225	194	190	1238	206.33	2484	7
John Macatula; Anton Alcazaren	Men's doubles	191	160	148	155	190	208	1052	175.33	2178	17
John Macatula; Anton Alcazaren	Men's doubles	209	165	175	202	183	192	1126	187.67	2178	17
Alexis Sy; Krizziah Tabora	Women's doubles	179	226	200	168	176	173	1122	187.00	2254	13
Alexis Sy; Krizziah Tabora	Women's doubles	148	228	198	191	202	165	1132	188.67	2254	13
Liza Del Rosario; Lara Posadas	Women's doubles	191	245	166	200	155	226	1183	197.17	2284	10
Liza Del Rosario; Lara Posadas	Women's doubles	225	182	201	130	203	160	1101	183.50	2284	10
Mardes Arles; Dyan Coronacion	Women's doubles	171	200	213	190	212	201	1187	197.83	2311	9
Mardes Arles; Dyan Coronacion	Women's doubles	225	182	201	130	203	160	1101	183.00	2311	9
Krizziah Tabora; Kevin Cu	Mixed doubles	216	237	224	242	180	278	1377	229.50	2585	10
Krizziah Tabora; Kevin Cu	Mixed doubles	199	180	203	236	184	206	1208	201.33	2585	10
Liza Del Rosario; Kenneth Chua	Mixed doubles	219	205	206	235	187	197	1249	208.17	2563	14
Liza Del Rosario; Kenneth Chua	Mixed doubles	193	213	217	212	245	234	1314	219.00	2563	14
Alexis Sy; Jo-Mar Jumapao	Mixed doubles	177	256	206	203	195	173	1210	201.67	2445	22
Alexis Sy; Jo-Mar Jumapao	Mixed doubles	194	245	222	202	203	169	1235	205.83	2445	22
Lara Posadas; Merwin Tan	Mixed doubles	170	169	200	215	218	205	1177	196.17	2416	23
Lara Posadas; Merwin Tan	Mixed doubles	247	177	215	175	190	235	1239	206.50	2416	23
Mardes Arles; Anton Alcazaren	Mixed doubles	189	192	188	235	192	171	1167	194.50	2378	26
Mardes Arles; Anton Alcazaren	Mixed doubles	192	197	173	246	221	182	1211	201.83	2378	26
Dyan Coronacion; John Macatula	Mixed doubles	178	159	158	200	184	179	1058	176.33	2327	27
Dyan Coronacion; John Macatula	Mixed doubles	203	266	192	186	210	212	1269	211.50	2327	27

=== Trios ===
Athlete	Event	Games 1–6						Total	Average	Grand Total	Rank
Athlete	Event	1	2	3	4	5	6	Total	Average	Grand Total	Rank
Anton Alcazaren; John Macatula; Kevin Cu	Men's trios	211	189	204	163	197	214	1178	196.33	3425	11
Anton Alcazaren; John Macatula; Kevin Cu	Men's trios	204	179	218	132	163	182	1078	179.67	3425	11
Anton Alcazaren; John Macatula; Kevin Cu	Men's trios	170	202	243	179	194	181	1169	194.83	3425	11
Merwin Tan; Jo-Mar Jumapao; Kenneth Chua	Men's trios	167	214	215	124	278	202	1200	200.00	3622	9
Merwin Tan; Jo-Mar Jumapao; Kenneth Chua	Men's trios	189	179	183	224	278	201	1254	209.00	3622	9
Merwin Tan; Jo-Mar Jumapao; Kenneth Chua	Men's trios	175	215	137	225	201	215	1168	194.67	3622	9
Liza Del Rosario; JLara Posadas; Krizziah Tabora	Women's trios	212	193	199	222	250	207	1283	213.83	3652	4
Liza Del Rosario; JLara Posadas; Krizziah Tabora	Women's trios	198	224	188	236	177	189	1212	202.00	3652	4
Liza Del Rosario; JLara Posadas; Krizziah Tabora	Women's trios	174	177	200	202	231	173	1157	192.83	3652	4
Mardes Arles; Dyan Coronacion; Alexis Sy	Women's trios	217	172	155	142	188	211	1085	180.83	3360	8
Mardes Arles; Dyan Coronacion; Alexis Sy	Women's trios	189	171	182	277	190	157	1166	194.33	3360	8
Mardes Arles; Dyan Coronacion; Alexis Sy	Women's trios	176	184	191	177	168	213	1109	184.83	3360	8

=== Team ===
Athlete	Event	Games 1–6						Total	Average	Grand Total	Rank
Athlete	Event	1	2	3	4	5	6	Total	Average	Grand Total	Rank
Jo-Mar Jumapao; Kenneth Chua; Merwin Tan; Anton Alcazaren; Kevin Cu	Men's team	221	227	212	210	181	255	1306	217.67	6169	5
Jo-Mar Jumapao; Kenneth Chua; Merwin Tan; Anton Alcazaren; Kevin Cu	Men's team	206	206	256	201	333	193	1284	214.00	6169	5
Jo-Mar Jumapao; Kenneth Chua; Merwin Tan; Anton Alcazaren; Kevin Cu	Men's team	204	194	238	199	235	203	1273	212.17	6169	5
Jo-Mar Jumapao; Kenneth Chua; Merwin Tan; Anton Alcazaren; Kevin Cu	Men's team	198	203	247	217	141	168	1174	195.67	6169	5
Jo-Mar Jumapao; Kenneth Chua; Merwin Tan; Anton Alcazaren; Kevin Cu	Men's team	159	217	213	201	170	172	1132	188.67	6169	5
Liza Del Rosario; Alexis Sy; Mardes Arles; Dyan Coronacion; Lara Posadas; Krizziah Tabora	Women's team	236	245	200	186	181	211	1259	209.83	6075	3rd place, bronze medalist(s)
Liza Del Rosario; Alexis Sy; Mardes Arles; Dyan Coronacion; Lara Posadas; Krizziah Tabora	Women's team	246	194	173	161	183	213	1170	195.00	6075	3rd place, bronze medalist(s)
Liza Del Rosario; Alexis Sy; Mardes Arles; Dyan Coronacion; Lara Posadas; Krizziah Tabora	Women's team	0	0	0	185	186	190	561	187.00	6075	3rd place, bronze medalist(s)
Liza Del Rosario; Alexis Sy; Mardes Arles; Dyan Coronacion; Lara Posadas; Krizziah Tabora	Women's team	162	192	217	0	0	0	571	190.33	6075	3rd place, bronze medalist(s)
Liza Del Rosario; Alexis Sy; Mardes Arles; Dyan Coronacion; Lara Posadas; Krizziah Tabora	Women's team	223	189	201	231	168	230	1242	207.00	6075	3rd place, bronze medalist(s)
Liza Del Rosario; Alexis Sy; Mardes Arles; Dyan Coronacion; Lara Posadas; Krizziah Tabora	Women's team	192	268	238	195	187	192	1272	212.00	6075	3rd place, bronze medalist(s)

=== Masters ===
Athlete	Event	Block	Games 1–8								Total	Average	Grand Total	Rank
Athlete	Event	Block	1	2	3	4	5	6	7	8	Total	Average	Grand Total	Rank
Liza Del Rosario	Women's masters	Short Oil	182	169	225	228	228	216	244	204	1696	212.00	3330	13
Liza Del Rosario	Women's masters	Short Oil				10	10	10	10		40	212.00	3330	13
Liza Del Rosario	Women's masters	Long Oil	191	207	200	188	222	206	193	157	1564	203.75	3330	13
Liza Del Rosario	Women's masters	Long Oil		10			10	10			30	203.75	3330	13
Krizziah Tabora	Women's masters	Short Oil	204	210	205	212	212	189	187	222	1641	205.13	3199	16
Krizziah Tabora	Women's masters	Short Oil	10				10			10	30	205.13	3199	16
Krizziah Tabora	Women's masters	Long Oil	189	140	193	177	199	170	193	247	1508	196.81	3199	16
Krizziah Tabora	Women's masters	Long Oil							10	10	20	196.81	3199	16

== Figure skating ==
Athlete	Event	SP		FS		Total	
Athlete	Event	Points	Rank	Points	Rank	Points	Rank
Michael Christian Martinez	Men's singles	54.74	2	116.89	2	171.63	2nd place, silver medalist(s)
Jules Vince Alpe	Men's singles	41.14	5	71.75	6	112.89	6
Alisson Krystle Perticheto	Women's singles	48.54	2	64.86	4	113.4	3rd place, bronze medalist(s)

== Fencing ==
=== Men's ===
Athlete	Event	Seeding		Round of 16	Quarterfinals	Semifinals	Final	
Athlete	Event	Pool Record	Ranking	Opposition Score	Opposition Score	Opposition Score	Opposition Score	Rank
Noelito Jose Jr.	Men's individual épée	3 – 1	Q	Panthawit Chamcharern (THA); L 0-1	Did Not Advance			
Reynaldo Perez, Jr.	Men's individual épée	2 – 2		Did Not Advance				
Nathaniel Perez	Men's individual foil	3 – 0	Q	Bye	Joshua Ian Lim (SGP); W 1 – 0	Jet Ng Shang Fei (SGP); W 1 – 0	Brennan Wayne Louie (PHI); L 0 – 1	2nd place, silver medalist(s)
Brennan Wayne Louie	Men's individual foil	3 – 0	Q	Bye	Hans Yoong (MAS); W 1- 0	Sopanut Mayakarn (THA); W 1 – 0	Nathaniel Perez (PHI); W 1 – 0	1st place, gold medalist(s)
Eric Brando II	Men's individual sabre	3 – 2	Q	Bye	Ahmad Huzaifah bin Saharudin (SGP); L 0 – 1	Did Not Advance		
Donnie Arth Navarro	Men's individual sabre	2 – 2		Did Not Advance				

=== Women's ===
Athlete	Event	Seeding		Round of 16	Quarterfinals	Semifinals	Final	
Athlete	Event	Pool Record	Ranking	Opposition Score	Opposition Score	Opposition Score	Opposition Score	Rank
Harlene Raguin	Women's individual épée	3 – 2	Q	Bye	Korawan Thanee (THA); W 1 – 0	Hanniel Abella (PHI); L 0 – 1	Did Not Advance	3rd place, bronze medalist(s)
Hanniel Abella	Women's individual épée	3 – 2	Q	Bye	Kanyapat Meechai (THA); W 1 – 0	Harlene Raguin (PHI); W 1 – 0	Nguyễn Thị Như Hoa (VIE); L 0 – 1	2nd place, silver medalist(s)
Maxine Isabel Esteban	Women's individual foil	3 – 2	Q	Bye	Natasha Ezzra Binti Abu Bakar (MAS); W 1 – 0	Amita Marie Nicolette Berthier (SGP); L 0 – 1	Did Not Advance	3rd place, bronze medalist(s)
Samantha Catantan	Women's individual foil	3 – 2	Q	Bye	Ploypailin Thongchampa (THA); W 1 – 0	Nicole Mae Wong Hui Shan (SGP); W 1 – 0	Amita Marie Nicolette Berthier (SGP); L 0 – 1	2nd place, silver medalist(s)
Clichelleyn Del Rosario	Women's individual sabre	1 – 4		Did Not Advance				
Jylyn Nicanor	Women's individual sabre	2 – 3	Q	Bye	Lau Ywen (SGP); L 0 – 1	Did Not Advance		

== Football ==
=== Men's ===
Head Coach: Marlon Maro

No.	Pos.	Player	Date of birth (age)	Club
1	GK	Ray Joseph Joyel	4 September 1996 (aged 20)	(Philippine Football Federation) Kaya FC–Makati-B
2	MF	Jordan Jarvis	17 April 1998 (aged 19)	(Philippine Football Federation) Davao Aguilas
3	MF	Daniel Gadia	3 July 1995 (aged 22)	(Philippine Football Federation) Meralco Manila
5		Jeremiah Rocha	9 December 1996 (aged 20)	(Philippine Football Federation) Kaya FC–Makati-B
6	MF	Yoshiharu Koizumi	19 January 1995 (aged 22)	(Philippine Football Federation) Forza FC
7	DF	Junell Bautista	10 June 1996 (aged 21)	(Philippine Football Federation) Davao Aguilas
9		Dimitri Limbo	17 November 1997 (aged 19)	(Philippine Football Federation) Kaya FC–Makati-B
10	MF	Dylan De Bruycker	5 December 1997 (aged 19)	(Philippine Football Federation) Davao Aguilas
11	DF	Julian Clarino	15 August 1995 (aged 21)	(Philippine Football Federation) Meralco Manila
12		Nimrod Balabat	14 March 1995 (aged 22)	(Philippine Football Federation) San Beda College
13	DF	Joshua Grommen	10 July 1996 (aged 21)	(Philippine Football Federation) Ceres–Negros
14	DF	Kouichi Belgira	28 December 1996 (aged 20)	(Philippine Football Federation) JPV Marikina
15		Richard Talaroc Jr.	23 April 1995 (aged 22)	(Philippine Football Federation) Davao Aguilas
16		Christian Lapas	10 November 1998 (aged 18)	(Philippine Football Federation) Kaya FC–Makati-B
18		Roberto Corsame Jr.	14 December 1996 (aged 20)	(Philippine Football Federation) Arellano University
19	GK	Nathanael Villanueva	25 October 1995 (aged 21)	(Philippine Football Federation) Meralco Manila
20		Reymart Cubon	16 April 1995 (aged 22)	(Philippine Football Federation) Davao Aguilas
21		Jeremiah Borlongan	28 August 1995 (aged 21)	(Philippine Football Federation) Kaya FC–Makati-B
23	FW	Javier Gayoso	11 February 1997 (aged 20)	(Philippine Football Federation) Ateneo de Manila University

Group stage

Pos	Team	Pld	W	D	L	GF	GA	GD	Pts	Qualification
1	Thailand	5	4	1	0	10	1	+9	13	Semi-finals
2	Indonesia	5	3	2	0	7	1	+6	11	Semi-finals
3	Vietnam	5	3	1	1	12	4	+8	10	
4	Philippines	5	2	0	3	4	10	−6	6	
5	Timor-Leste	5	1	0	4	2	8	−6	3	
6	Cambodia	5	0	0	5	1	12	−11	0	

Updated to match(es) played on 24 August 2017. Source: KL2017 Official Website
Rules for classification: 1) Points; 2) Goal difference; 3) Goals scored
15 August 2017
20:45

Cambodia	0–2	Philippines
	Report	Cubon 52'; Belgira 81'

Selayang Municipal Council Stadium, Selayang
Referee: Nagor Amir Noor Mohamed (Malaysia)

17 August 2017
20:45

Indonesia	3–0	Philippines
Septian 6'; Hargianto 45+1'; Saddil 58'	Report

Shah Alam Stadium, Shah Alam
Referee: Sudish Kumar Pandey (Nepal)

20 August 2017
20:45

Philippines	0–4	Vietnam
	Report	Phượng 37'; Thanh 45+1'; Toàn 50'; Tài 89'

Shah Alam Stadium, Shah Alam
Referee: Chen Hsin-chuan (Chinese Taipei)

22 August 2017
16:00

Philippines	0–2	Thailand
	Report	Montree 28'; Sittichok 45+1'

Selayang Municipal Council Stadium, Selayang
Referee: Tejas Nagvenkar (India)

24 August 2017
16:00

Timor-Leste	1–2	Philippines
45'	Report	Gayoso 10', 90+4'

UM Arena Stadium, Kuala Lumpur

=== Women's ===
Head coach: Marnelli Dimzon

No.	Pos.	Player	Date of birth (age)	Club
1	GK	Inna Palacios	8 February 1994 (aged 23)	(Philippine Football Federation) De La Salle University
22	GK	Hazel Arce	15 August 1997 (aged 20)	(Philippine Football Federation) Far Eastern University
21	DF	Joanna Almeda	24 September 1999 (aged 17)	(Philippine Football Federation) Green Archers United
3	DF	Alesa Dolino	26 October 1992 (aged 24)	(Philippine Football Federation) OutKast
28	DF	Mary Duran	28 March 1997 (aged 20)	(Philippine Football Federation) De La Salle University
5	DF	Hali Long	21 January 1995 (aged 22)	(United States Soccer Federation) University of Arkansas at Little Rock
13	DF	Patricia Tomanon	10 April 1994 (aged 23)	(United States Soccer Federation) Florida International University
29	MF	Anicka Castañeda	15 December 1999 (aged 17)	(Philippine Football Federation) Green Archers United
34	MF	Sara Castañeda	5 December 1996 (aged 20)	(Philippine Football Federation) De La Salle University
25	MF	Alisha del Campo	20 September 1999 (aged 17)	(Philippine Football Federation) Green Archers United
24	MF	Patrice Impelido	9 October 1987 (aged 29)	(Philippine Football Federation) Hiraya
9	MF	Irish Navaja	12 May 1997 (aged 20)	(Philippine Football Federation) De La Salle University
12	MF	Jovelle Sudaria	11 November 1996 (aged 20)	(Philippine Football Federation) Far Eastern University
19	FW	Eva Madarang	13 September 1997 (aged 19)	(United States Soccer Federation) Moorpark College
		Mea Bernal	24 November 1989 (aged 27)	(Philippine Football Federation) OutKast
		Kyrhen Dimaandal	16 October 1996 (aged 20)	(Philippine Football Federation) De La Salle University
		Kyla Jan Inquig	24 January 1997 (aged 20)	(Philippine Football Federation) De La Salle University
		Charisa Marie Lemoran	21 September 1998 (aged 18)	(Philippine Football Federation) University of Santo Tomas
		Faith Ruetas	3 July 2003 (aged 14)	(Canadian Soccer Association) St. Theresa of Lisieux H.S.
		Camille Rodriguez	27 December 1994 (aged 22)	(Philippine Football Federation) Ateneo de Manila University

Group stage

Pos	Team	Pld	W	D	L	GF	GA	GD	Pts	Final Result
1	Vietnam	4	3	1	0	13	2	+11	10	Gold medal
2	Thailand	4	3	1	0	13	4	+9	10	Silver medal
3	Myanmar	4	2	0	2	14	6	+8	6	Bronze medal
4	Philippines	4	1	0	3	3	13	−10	3	
5	Malaysia (H)	4	0	0	4	1	19	−18	0	

Source: Schedule
Rules for classification: 1) Points; 2) Goal difference; 3) Goals scored; More: Technical Handbook
(H) Hosts
15 August 2017
20:45

Malaysia	1–2	Philippines
Rofinus 51'	Report	Impelido 45'; Rodriguez 73'

UiTM Stadium, Shah Alam
Referee: Law Bik Chi (Hong Kong)

17 August 2017
16:00

Philippines	0–3	Vietnam
	Report	Huỳnh Như 65'; Dung 84'; Muôn 90+4'

UM Arena Stadium, Kuala Lumpur
Referee: Yu Hong (China)

22 August 2017
16:00

Myanmar	6–0	Philippines
Khin Moe Wai 4', 80', 90+4'; Win Theingi Tun 16'; Yee Yee Oo 18'; Naw Ar Lo Wer Phaw 19'	Report

UM Arena Stadium, Kuala Lumpur

24 August 2017
16:00

Thailand	3–1	Philippines
Rattikan 7'; Nisa 64'; Pitsamai 72'	Report	Long 90+1'

UiTM Stadium, Shah Alam

== Netball ==
Philippines national netball team
Players	Coaching staff
Cathlyn Jane Seno; Ana Thea Cenarosa; Leanne Espina; Eliezza Dianne Ventura; Diana Doqueza; Anjelica Estacion; Teresa Angeline Aquino; Ana Theresa Codinera; Meilyn Guerra Ip; Eunice Krisma Ann Japone; Clarice Jasper Sup; Katryna Rose Domino	No information

Team	Preliminary round		Semifinal	Final	Rank
Team	Round Robin	Rank	Semifinal	Final	Rank
Philippines	Thailand; L 16 – 86	5	Did Not Advance		
Philippines	Brunei; L 32 – 69	5	Did Not Advance		
Philippines	Singapore; L 22 – 91	5	Did Not Advance		
Philippines	Malaysia; L 11 – 96	5	Did Not Advance		

== Ice hockey ==
=== Men's ===
Squad

Head coach: (Czech Republic) Daniel Brodan

No.	Pos.	Name	Height	Weight	Birthdate
2	F	Lenard Rigel Lancero II	1.72 m (5 ft 8 in)	70 kg (150 lb)	July 2, 1995 (aged 22)
7	F	Carl Montano	1.75 m (5 ft 9 in)	85 kg (187 lb)	September 11, 1983 (aged 33)
8	D	Patrick Syquiatco	1.68 m (5 ft 6 in)	84 kg (185 lb)	February 27, 1995 (aged 22)
14	F	Carlo Tenedero	1.65 m (5 ft 5 in)	64 kg (141 lb)	February 7, 1985 (aged 32)
18	D	Jose Iñigo Cadiz	1.79 m (5 ft 10 in)	90 kg (200 lb)	February 9, 1990 (aged 27)
19	D	Javier Cadiz	1.75 m (5 ft 9 in)	75 kg (165 lb)	March 25, 1997 (aged 20)
21	F	Daniel Pastrana	1.72 m (5 ft 8 in)	64 kg (141 lb)	September 4, 1995 (aged 21)
25	F	Steven Füglister	1.85 m (6 ft 1 in)	90 kg (200 lb)	January 25, 1986 (aged 31)
28	D	Francois Gautier	1.78 m (5 ft 10 in)	85 kg (187 lb)	November 28, 1983 (aged 33)
29	G	Paolo Spafford	1.70 m (5 ft 7 in)	70 kg (150 lb)	June 10, 1985 (aged 32)
30	G	Gianpietro Iseppi	1.83 m (6 ft 0 in)	92 kg (203 lb)	April 24, 1982 (aged 35)
69	D	Julius Santiago	1.74 m (5 ft 9 in)	77 kg (170 lb)	June 3, 1996 (aged 21)
76	D	Joshua Carino	1.63 m (5 ft 4 in)	67 kg (148 lb)	August 3, 2000 (aged 17)
79	F	Paul Sanchez	1.81 m (5 ft 11 in)	85 kg (187 lb)	April 19, 1990 (aged 27)
80	F	Miguel Serrano	1.78 m (5 ft 10 in)	65 kg (143 lb)	March 17, 2000 (aged 17)
81	F	Jan Aro Regencia	1.61 m (5 ft 3 in)	50 kg (110 lb)	October 18, 2000 (aged 16)
84	D	Georgino Orda	1.73 m (5 ft 8 in)	81 kg (179 lb)	February 12, 1984 (aged 33)
86	D	Hector Navasero	1.66 m (5 ft 5 in)	78 kg (172 lb)	September 7, 1991 (aged 25)
91	F	Jorell Crisostomo	1.73 m (5 ft 8 in)	60 kg (130 lb)	April 25, 2000 (aged 17)
96	F	Benjamin Imperial	1.68 m (5 ft 6 in)	77 kg (170 lb)	February 23, 1999 (aged 18)

Results

Team	Round robin	Rank
Philippines	Indonesia; W 12 – 0	1st place, gold medalist(s)
Philippines	Singapore; W 7 – 2	1st place, gold medalist(s)
Philippines	Malaysia; W 8 – 7 SO	1st place, gold medalist(s)
Philippines	Thailand; W 5 – 4	1st place, gold medalist(s)

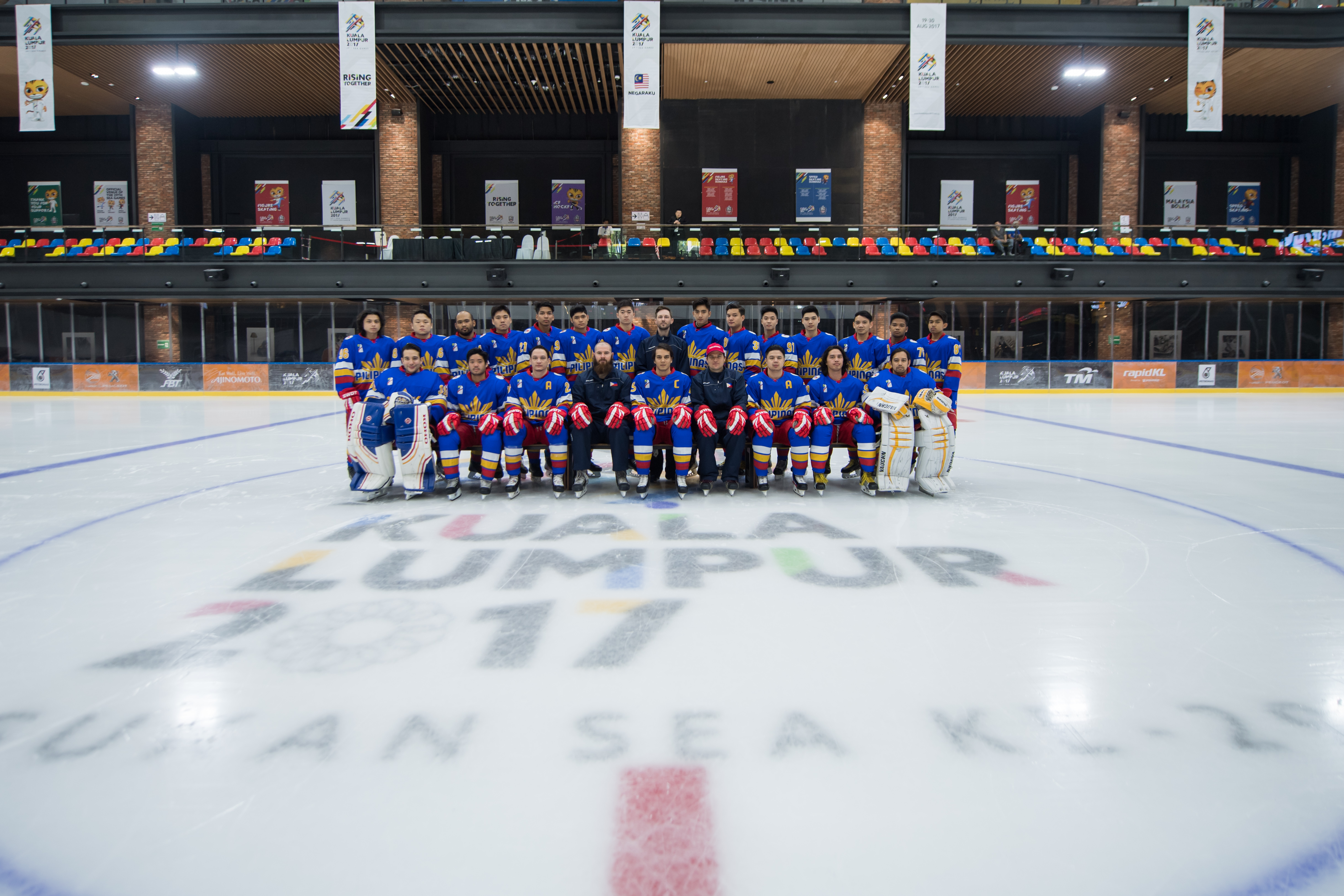
The Philippine national ice hockey team.

== Indoor hockey ==
=== Men's ===
Team	Preliminary round		5Th Place Final	Rank
Team	Round Robin	Rank	5Th Place Final	Rank
Philippines	Malaysia; L 0 – 16	6	Vietnam; L 0 – 7	6
Philippines	Thailand; L 1 – 17	6	Vietnam; L 0 – 7	6
Philippines	Indonesia; L 0 – 14	6	Vietnam; L 0 – 7	6
Philippines	Singapore; L 0 – 6	6	Vietnam; L 0 – 7	6
Philippines	Vietnam; L 1 – 5	6	Vietnam; L 0 – 7	6

=== Women's ===
Team	Preliminary round		Final	Rank
Team	Round Robin	Rank	Final	Rank
Philippines	Thailand; L 0 – 14	6	Did not advance	
Philippines	Malaysia; L 0 – 19	6	Did not advance	
Philippines	Singapore; L 0 - 5	6	Did not advance	
Philippines	Indonesia; L 0 - 11	6	Did not advance	

== Judo ==
=== Men's ===
Athlete	Event	Elimination round of 16	Quarterfinal	Semifinal	Final	Rank
Shugen Nakano	66 kg	—N/a	Mochammad Syaiful Raharjo (INA); L 0 – 1	Repechage; Aung Zayar Tun (MYA); W 1 – 0	Repechage; Ace Ang (SGP); W 1 – 0	3rd place, bronze medalist(s)
Keisei Nakano	73 kg	Bye	Thiti Kumpapan (THA); W 1 – 0	Nguyễn Tấn Công (VIE); L 0 – 1	Repechage; Xaisengxeun Nouven (LAO); W 1 – 0	3rd place, bronze medalist(s)
Kohei Kohagura	81 kg	Bye	Chittakon Xayasan (LAO); W 1 – 0	Horas Manurung (INA); L 0 – 1	Repechage; Gary Chow Weng Luen (SGP); L 0 – 1	5

=== Women's ===
Athlete	Event	Quarterfinal	Semifinal	Final	Rank
Kiyomi Watanabe	63 kg	Chu Myat Noe Wai (MYA); W 1 – 0	Nik Norlydiawati Azman (MAS); W 1 – 0	Orapin Senatham (THA); W 1 – 0	1st place, gold medalist(s)
Mariya Takahashi	70 kg	—N/a	Nguyễn Thị Diệu Tiên (VIE); W 1 – 0	Surattana Thongsri (THA); W 1 – 0	1st place, gold medalist(s)
Sydney Sy	78 kg	Aye Aye Aung (MYA); L 0 – 1	Repecharge; Chatthayaporn P. (THA); W 1 – 0	Did Not Advance	3rd place, bronze medalist(s)

== Muaythai ==
=== Men's ===
Athlete	Event	Round of 16	Quarterfinal	Semifinal	Final	Rank
Khen Johnson	54 kg	Bye	Thongbang Seuaphom (LAO); L 27-30	Did not advance		
Phillip Delarmino	57 kg	Bye	Thachtana Luangphon (THA); L 27-30	Did not advance		
Ryan Jakiri	63.5 kg	Bye	Bye	Khun Dima (CAM); L RSC - HEAD 9-10	Did not advance	3rd place, bronze medalist(s)
Jonathan Polosan	67 kg	Bye	Latxasak Souliyavong (LAO); L 27-30	Did not advance		
Jay Harold Gregori	71 kg	Bye	Trương Quốc Hưng (VIE); L 28-29	Did not advance		

== Pencak Silat ==
Athlete	Event	Quarterfinal	Semifinal	Final	Rank
Dines Dumaan	Men's tanding class A 45-50 kg				1st place, gold medalist(s)
Rick-Rod Ortega	Men's tanding class C 55-60 kg				3rd place, bronze medalist(s)
Jefferson Rhey Loon	Men's tanding class D 60-65 kg				3rd place, bronze medalist(s)
Juryll del Rosario	Men's tanding class I 85-90 kg				3rd place, bronze medalist(s)
Princesslyn Enopia	Women's tanding class A 45-50 kg				3rd place, bronze medalist(s)

== Rugby Sevens ==
=== Men's ===
Squad list	Preliminary round		Bronze Medal	Rank
Squad list	Round Robin	Rank	Bronze Medal	Rank
Daniel Ricky Kucia; Justin Coveney; Christopher Ian Everingham; Christopher Hitch; Evan Spargo; Jake Gerald Letts; Harrison Philip Blake; Harry Morris; Jason Ritchie Lynch; Jonel Madrona; Rupert Zappia; Vincent Francis Young; Coach: (Philippines) Frano Michael Botica	Indonesia; W 47 – 7	4 Q	Thailand; L 7 – 26	4
Daniel Ricky Kucia; Justin Coveney; Christopher Ian Everingham; Christopher Hitch; Evan Spargo; Jake Gerald Letts; Harrison Philip Blake; Harry Morris; Jason Ritchie Lynch; Jonel Madrona; Rupert Zappia; Vincent Francis Young; Coach: (Philippines) Frano Michael Botica	Cambodia; W 47 – 7	4 Q	Thailand; L 7 – 26	4
Daniel Ricky Kucia; Justin Coveney; Christopher Ian Everingham; Christopher Hitch; Evan Spargo; Jake Gerald Letts; Harrison Philip Blake; Harry Morris; Jason Ritchie Lynch; Jonel Madrona; Rupert Zappia; Vincent Francis Young; Coach: (Philippines) Frano Michael Botica	Malaysia; L 14 – 24	4 Q	Thailand; L 7 – 26	4
Daniel Ricky Kucia; Justin Coveney; Christopher Ian Everingham; Christopher Hitch; Evan Spargo; Jake Gerald Letts; Harrison Philip Blake; Harry Morris; Jason Ritchie Lynch; Jonel Madrona; Rupert Zappia; Vincent Francis Young; Coach: (Philippines) Frano Michael Botica	Singapore; L 7 – 21	4 Q	Thailand; L 7 – 26	4
Daniel Ricky Kucia; Justin Coveney; Christopher Ian Everingham; Christopher Hitch; Evan Spargo; Jake Gerald Letts; Harrison Philip Blake; Harry Morris; Jason Ritchie Lynch; Jonel Madrona; Rupert Zappia; Vincent Francis Young; Coach: (Philippines) Frano Michael Botica	Thailand; L 14 – 31	4 Q	Thailand; L 7 – 26	4

=== Women's ===
Squad list	Preliminary round		Semifinal	Bronze Medal	Rank
Squad list	Round Robin	Rank	Semifinal	Bronze Medal	Rank
Camilla Maryam Maslo; Kaye Llanie Honoras; Helena Roxanne Indigne; Gelanie Gamba; Ada Milby; Hayes Monica Bolofer; Bird Tanya Louise; Rassiel Sales; Madille Salinas; Angella Camille San Juan; Sylvia Tudoc; Dixie Star Yu; Coach: (Australia) Shirley Russell	Thailand; L 0 – 32	4 Q	Thailand; L 0 – 26	Malaysia; L 5 – 7	4
Camilla Maryam Maslo; Kaye Llanie Honoras; Helena Roxanne Indigne; Gelanie Gamba; Ada Milby; Hayes Monica Bolofer; Bird Tanya Louise; Rassiel Sales; Madille Salinas; Angella Camille San Juan; Sylvia Tudoc; Dixie Star Yu; Coach: (Australia) Shirley Russell	Laos; W 31 - 0	4 Q	Thailand; L 0 – 26	Malaysia; L 5 – 7	4
Camilla Maryam Maslo; Kaye Llanie Honoras; Helena Roxanne Indigne; Gelanie Gamba; Ada Milby; Hayes Monica Bolofer; Bird Tanya Louise; Rassiel Sales; Madille Salinas; Angella Camille San Juan; Sylvia Tudoc; Dixie Star Yu; Coach: (Australia) Shirley Russell	Singapore; L 0 – 25	4 Q	Thailand; L 0 – 26	Malaysia; L 5 – 7	4
Camilla Maryam Maslo; Kaye Llanie Honoras; Helena Roxanne Indigne; Gelanie Gamba; Ada Milby; Hayes Monica Bolofer; Bird Tanya Louise; Rassiel Sales; Madille Salinas; Angella Camille San Juan; Sylvia Tudoc; Dixie Star Yu; Coach: (Australia) Shirley Russell	Malaysia; D 5 – 5	4 Q	Thailand; L 0 – 26	Malaysia; L 5 – 7	4

== Short track speed skating ==
Athlete	Event	Heats		Final	
Athlete	Event	Time	Rank	Time	Rank
Kathryn Magno	500 m		PEN	Did not advance	
Kathryn Magno	1000 m	121.153	5Q	111.893	4

== Taekwondo ==
=== Men's ===
Legend

- SUP – Won by Superiority
- PTG – Won by points gap

Athlete	Event	1/8 final	Quarterfinal	Semifinal	Final	Rank
Francis Aaron Agojo	63 kg	—N/a	Va Mithona (CAM); W (PTG) 35 – 5	Nguyễn Văn Duy (VIE); L 15 – 30	Did Not Advance	3rd place, bronze medalist(s)
Arven Alcantara	68 kg	—N/a	—N/a	Sorphabmixay Sithikon (LAO); W 26 – 4	Rozaimi Bin Rozali (MAS); L (SUP) 17 – 17	2nd place, silver medalist(s)
Samuel Thomas Harper Morrison	74 kg	—N/a	—N/a	Lý Hồng Phúc (VIE); W 16 – 11	Dinggo Ardian Prayogo (INA); W 28 – 18	1st place, gold medalist(s)

=== Women's ===
Athlete	Event	1/8 final	Quarterfinal	Semifinal	Final	Rank
Rhezie Canama Aragon	53 kg	—N/a	—N/a	—N/a	Mariska Halinda (INA); L 4 – 9	2nd place, silver medalist(s)
Pauline Louise Lopez	62 kg	—N/a	—N/a	Hà Thị Nguyên (VIE); L 3 – 4	Did Not Advance	3rd place, bronze medalist(s)
Kirstie Elaine Alora	73 kg	—N/a	—N/a	Sonesavanh Sirimanotham (LAO); W 13 – 3	Sorn Seavmey (CAM); L 5 – 13	2nd place, silver medalist(s)

=== Poomsae ===
Athlete	Event	Score	Rank
Rodolfo Reyes, Jr.	Men's individual	7.87	3rd place, bronze medalist(s)
Rinna Babanto; Juvenile Faye Crisostomo; Jocel Lyn Ninobla	Women's team	8.30	3rd place, bronze medalist(s)
Dustin Jacob Mella; Raphael Enrico Mella; Rodolfo Reyes Jr.	Men's team	8.37	1st place, gold medalist(s)

== Tennis ==
Athlete	Event	Round 1	Round 2	Quarter Final	Semi Final	Final	Rank
Athlete	Event	Opposition Result	Opposition Result	Opposition Result	Opposition Result	Opposition Result	Rank
Francis Casey Alcantara	Men's singles	Bye	Kenny Bun (CAM); W 6 – 2, 4 – 6, 6 – 1	Jirat Navasirisomboon (THA); L 2 – 6, 3 – 6	Did Not Advance		
Jeson Patrombon	Men's singles	Bye	Vitaya Rasavady (LAO); W 6 – 0, 6 – 1	Wishaya Trongcharoenchaikul (THA); L 4 – 6, 5 – 7	Did Not Advance		
Katharina Melissa Lehnert	Women's singles	—N/a	Lavina Tananta (INA); W 6 – 0, 6 – 0	Luksika Kumkhum (THA); L 1 – 6, 3 – 6	Did Not Advance		
Anna Clarice Patrimonio	Women's singles	—N/a	Charmaine Seah Shi Yi (SGP); W 6 – 0, 4 – 6, 6 – 4	Beatrice Gumulya (INA); W 7 – 6 (4), 4 – 6, 6 – 3	Andrea Ka (CAM); W 7 – 6 (5), 7 – 6 (5)	Luksika Kumkhum (THA); L 0 – 6, 1 – 6	2nd place, silver medalist(s)
Francis Casey Alcantara; Ruben Gonzales	Men's doubles	—N/a	Aung Myo Thant (MYA); Aung Thet Oo (MYA); W 2 – 0	Aditya Sasongko (INA); Sunu Wahyu Trijati (INA); W 2 – 0	Kittipong Wachiramanowong (THA); Wishaya Trongcharoenchaikul (THA); W 2 – 0	Sanchai Ratiwatana (THA); Sonchat Ratiwatana (THA); L 1 – 2	2nd place, silver medalist(s)
Alberto Lim Jr. Jeson Patrombon	Men's doubles	—N/a	Sanchai Ratiwatana (THA); Sonchat Ratiwatana (THA); L 0 – 2	Did Not Advance			
Denise Dy; Katharina Lehnert	Women's doubles	—N/a	Ho Sreynoch (CAM); Hour Sreypov (CAM); W 2 – 0	Beatrice Gumulya (INA); Jessy Rompies (INA); W 2 – 1	Luksika Kumkhum (THA); Noppawan Lertcheewakarn (THA); L 0 – 2	Did Not Advance	3rd place, bronze medalist(s)
Khim Iglupas; Anna Clarice Patrimonio	Women's doubles	—N/a	Deria Nur Haliza (INA); Aldila Sutjiadi (INA); L 0 – 2	Did Not Advance			
Denise Dy; Ruben Gonzales	Mixed doubles	—N/a	Hour Sreypov (CAM); Mam Phalkun (CAM); W 2 – 0	Aldila Sutjiadi (INA); Sunu Wahyu Trijati (INA); W 2 – 1	Nicha Lertpitaksinchai (THA); Sanchai Ratiwatana (THA); L 0 – 2	Did Not Advance	3rd place, bronze medalist(s)
Khim Iglupas; Alberto Lim Jr.	Mixed doubles	—N/a	Thandar Aung (MYA); Tin Myo Wai (MYA); W 2 – 0	Jessy Rompies (INA); Christopher Rungkat (INA); L 0 – 2	Did Not Advance		

== Triathlon ==
=== Men's ===
Athlete	Event	Swim (1.5 km)	Trans 1	Bike (40 km)	Trans 2	Run (10 km)	Total Time	Rank
Nikko Huelgas	Men's	20:57	0:21	1:00:00	0:22	37:51	1:59:30	1st place, gold medalist(s)
John Chicano	Men's	21:49	0:22	1:01:23	0:22	37:34	2:01:27	2nd place, silver medalist(s)

=== Women's ===
Athlete	Event	Swim (1.5 km)	Trans 1	Bike (40 km)	Trans 2	Run (10 km)	Total Time	Rank
Ma. Claire Adorna	Women's	21:09	0:28	1:07:01	0:25	49:56	2:18:58	2nd place, silver medalist(s)
Kim Mangrobang	Women's	21:10	0:25	1:06:56	0:24	42:20	2:11:14	1st place, gold medalist(s)

== Volleyball ==
=== Men's ===
Team

Results

Team	Preliminary round		Semifinal	Final	Rank
Team	Group B	Rank	Semifinal	Final	Rank
Philippines; Alnakran Abdilla; Mark Gil Alfafara; Geuel Asia; Bryan Bagunas; Alden Dave Cabaron; Bonjomar Castel; John Vic De Guzman (c); Gregorio Dolor; Reyson Fuentes; Jack Kalingking; Herschel Ramos; Relan Taneo	Vietnam; L 0 – 3	3	Did not advance		
Philippines; Alnakran Abdilla; Mark Gil Alfafara; Geuel Asia; Bryan Bagunas; Alden Dave Cabaron; Bonjomar Castel; John Vic De Guzman (c); Gregorio Dolor; Reyson Fuentes; Jack Kalingking; Herschel Ramos; Relan Taneo	Indonesia; L 1 – 3	3	Did not advance		
Philippines; Alnakran Abdilla; Mark Gil Alfafara; Geuel Asia; Bryan Bagunas; Alden Dave Cabaron; Bonjomar Castel; John Vic De Guzman (c); Gregorio Dolor; Reyson Fuentes; Jack Kalingking; Herschel Ramos; Relan Taneo	Timor-Leste; W 3 - 0	3	Did not advance		

=== Women's ===
Team

Results

Team	Preliminary round		Semifinal	Final	Rank
Team	Group B	Rank	Semifinal	Final	Rank
Philippines; Geneveve Casugod; Rhea Katrina Dimaculangan; Kim Fajardo; Jovelyn Gonzaga; Dawn Nicole Macandili; Aiza Maizo-Pontillas; Abigail Maraño; Frances Xinia Molina; Maika Angela Ortiz; Mika Aereen Reyes (c); Jaja Santiago; Alyssa Valdez	Malaysia; W 3 – 0	2	Thailand; L 0 – 3	Vietnam; L 0 – 3	4th

== Waterski ==
Athlete	Event	Preliminary		Finals	
Athlete	Event	Score	Rank	Score	Rank
Maiquel Jawn Selga	Women's Wakeboard	23.89	4	Did Not Advance	
Mark Griffin	Men's Wakeboard	71.44	1 Q	63.00	3rd place, bronze medalist(s)
Mark Griffin; Maiquel Jawn Selga	Mixed Wakeboard	—N/a		112.00	4

== Weightlifting ==
Athlete	Event	Snatch (kg)				Clean & Jerk (kg)				Total	Rank
Athlete	Event	1	2	3	Result	1	2	3	Result	Total	Rank
Nestor Colonia	56 kg	~~110~~	110	113	113	140	~~146~~	~~146~~	140	253	5

== Wushu ==
=== Men's taolu ===
Athlete	Event	Score	Rank
Daniel Parantac	Optional Taijiquan	9.56	4
Daniel Parantac	Compulsory 3rd Taijiquan	9.1	7
Thornton Quieney Lou Sayan	Nandao + nan gun	18.71	8
Thornton Quieney Lou Sayan	Nanquan	9.62	6
Norlence Ardee Catolico	Optional Dao Shu + Gun Shu	19.12	6
Norlence Ardee Catolico	Optional Changquan	9.52	7

=== Women's taolu ===
Athlete	Event	Score	Rank
Kimberly Macuha	Optional Jianshu	9.53	5
Kimberly Macuha	Optional Qiang Shu	9.28	8
Kimberly Macuha	Optional Changquan	9.38	9
Agatha Chrystenzen Wong	Optional Taijijian	9.65	2nd place, silver medalist(s)
Agatha Chrystenzen Wong	Compulsory 3rd Taijiquan	9.66	1st place, gold medalist(s)
