= Table tennis at the 2017 SEA Games – Men's singles =

Table tennis – Men's singles at the 2017 SEA Games
- Venue: MiTEC Hall 7
- Dates: 21–22 August 2017
- Competitors: 18 from 9 nations

Medalists
gold medal	Gao Ning (SGP)
silver medal	Clarence Chew (SGP)
bronze medal	Richard Gonzales (PHI)
bronze medal	Padasak Tanviriyavechakul (THA)

The men's singles competition of the table tennis events at the 2017 SEA Games is being held from 21 to 22 August at the MiTEC Hall 7 in Kuala Lumpur, Malaysia.

== Format ==
=== Singles Events ===
(i) All Singles events shall be played in two stages; Stage 1 Group Single Round Robin and Stage 2 Elimination competition comprising Semi-finals and Finals.

(ii) In Stage 1, athletes shall be divided into four groups, Groups A, B, C and D. Athletes in each Group shall play each other in a single round robin competition within each Group. Each match shall be decided by a best-offive sets format. Each athlete shall be awarded the following points for each match:

- Two points for a win.
- One point for a loss.

(iii) The winner in of each Group shall advance to the Stage 2 Semi-finals Elimination competition.

(iv) The winners of Group A and Group B shall be drawn for positions 1 and 4 respectively, whereas the winners of Group C and D shall be drawn for positions 2 or 3, taking into consideration separation of athletes from the same NOC. The matches shall be decided by best-of-seven games.

(v) The winners of the Elimination Semifinals competition shall qualify to play in the Finals for the gold medal.

(vi) There will be no playoff match for 3rd and 4th positions. Both losing SemiFinalists will receive a joint bronze medal each.

== Schedule ==
All times are Malaysian Time (UTC+08:00).

Date	Time	Round
21 August 2017	9:00	Preliminaries
22 August 2017	11:00	Semifinals
22 August 2017	19:00	Finals

== Results ==
=== Preliminary round ===
Source: Results (Groups) - Men's Singles

==== Group A ====
Player	Pld	W	L	GF	GA	PF	PA	Points
Gao Ning (SGP)	3	3	0	9	2	114	83	6
Nguyen Anh Tu (VIE)	3	2	1	8	4	116	93	5
Muhd Shakirin Bin Ibrahim (MAS)	3	1	2	4	6	86	86	4
Soeung Tola (CAM)	3	0	2	0	9	45	115	3

21 Aug 9:00 - Table 3
Name	1	2	3	4	5	Match
Gao Ning (SGP)	11	11	11			3
Soeung Tola (CAM)	8	5	3			0
Report

21 Aug 9:00 - Table 4
Name	1	2	3	4	5	Match
Muhd Shakirin Bin Ibrahim (MAS)	7	9	11	3		0
Nguyen Anh Tu (VIE)	11	11	6	11		3
Report

21 Aug 10:30 - Table 2
Name	1	2	3	4	5	Match
Gao Ning (SGP)	11	4	11	11	11	3
Nguyen Anh Tu (VIE)	4	11	9	13	7	2
Report

21 Aug 10:30 - Table 1
Name	1	2	3	4	5	Match
Muhd Shakirin Bin Ibrahim (MAS)	11	11	11			3
Soeung Tola (CAM)	7	4	3			0
Report

21 Aug 15:00 - Table 1
Name	1	2	3	4	5	Match
Gao Ning (SGP)	11	11	11			3
Muhd Shakirin Bin Ibrahim (MAS)	9	6	8			0
Report

21 Aug 15:00 - Table 3
Name	1	2	3	4	5	Match
Nguyen Anh Tu (VIE)	11	11	11			3
Soeung Tola (CAM)	1	9	5			0
Report

==== Group B ====
Player	Pld	W	L	GF	GA	PF	PA	Points
Richard Gonzales (PHI)	3	2	1	7	4	125	109	5
Leong Chee Feng (MAS)	3	2	1	7	3	109	79	5
Deepash Anil Bhagwani (INA)	3	1	2	3	7	89	108	4
Thet Ko Ko Latt (MYA)	3	1	2	4	7	89	112	4

21 Aug 9:00 - Table 2
Name	1	2	3	4	5	Match
Richard Gonzales (PHI)	9	11	9	8		1
Thet Ko Ko Latt (MYA)	11	7	11	11		3
Report

21 Aug 9:00 - Table 1
Name	1	2	3	4	5	Match
Leong Chee Feng (MAS)	11	11	11			3
Deepash Anil Bhagwani (INA)	9	4	6			0
Report

21 Aug 11:00 - Table 3
Name	1	2	3	4	5	Match
Richard Gonzales (PHI)	13	11	13			3
Deepash Anil Bhagwani (INA)	11	4	11			0
Report

21 Aug 11:00 - Table 1
Name	1	2	3	4	5	Match
Leong Chee Feng (MAS)	11	11	11			3
Thet Ko Ko Latt (MYA)	2	4	3			0
Report

21 Aug 15:00 - Table 2
Name	1	2	3	4	5	Match
Richard Gonzales (PHI)	11	17	12	11		3
Leong Chee Feng (MAS)	6	15	14	8		1
Report

21 Aug 15:00 - Table 4
Name	1	2	3	4	5	Match
Deepash Anil Bhagwani (INA)	6	11	16	11		3
Thet Ko Ko Latt (MYA)	11	6	14	7		1
Report

==== Group C ====
Player	Pld	W	L	GF	GA	PF	PA	Points
Clarence Chew (SGP)	4	4	0	12	0	132	62	8
Jann Mari Nayre (PHI)	4	3	1	9	4	128	100	7
Supanut Wisutmaythangkoon (THA)	4	2	2	6	7	115	124	6
Soe Min Oo (MYA)	4	1	3	5	9	84	143	5
Mosangsinh Sonepasith (LAO)	4	0	4	0	12	71	135	4

21 Aug 9:30 - Table 3
Name	1	2	3	4	5	Match
Supanut Wisutmaythangkoon (THA)	11	8	11	11		3
Soe Min Oo (MYA)	8	11	9	6		1
Report

21 Aug 9:30 - Table 1
Name	1	2	3	4	5	Match
Jann Mari Nayre (PHI)	11	11	11			3
Mosangsinh Sonepasith (LAO)	4	1	5			0
Report

21 Aug 11:00 - Table 2
Name	1	2	3	4	5	Match
Clarence Chew (SGP)	11	11	11			3
Soe Min Oo (MYA)	8	2	3			0
Report

21 Aug 11:00 - Table 4
Name	1	2	3	4	5	Match
Supanut Wisutmaythangkoon (THA)	9	7	4			0
Jann Mari Nayre (PHI)	11	11	11			3
Report

21 Aug 14:30 - Table 3
Name	1	2	3	4	5	Match
Clarence Chew (SGP)	11	11	11			3
Mosangsinh Sonepasith (LAO)	7	3	4			0
Report

21 Aug 14:30 - Table 1
Name	1	2	3	4	5	Match
Jann Mari Nayre (PHI)	14	11	9	12		3
Soe Min Oo (MYA)	12	4	11	10		1
Report

21 Aug 15:30 - Table 3
Name	1	2	3	4	5	Match
Clarence Chew (SGP)	11	11	11			3
Jann Mari Nayre (PHI)	5	5	6			0
Report

21 Aug 15:30 - Table 1
Name	1	2	3	4	5	Match
Supanut Wisutmaythangkoon (THA)	11	12	12			3
Mosangsinh Sonepasith (LAO)	4	10	10			0
Report

21 Aug 17:00 - Table 1
Name	1	2	3	4	5	Match
Clarence Chew (SGP)	11	11	11			3
Supanut Wisutmaythangkoon (THA)	4	8	7			0
Report

21 Aug 17:00 - Table 3
Name	1	2	3	4	5	Match
Mosangsinh Sonepasith (LAO)	8	5	10			0
Soe Min Oo (MYA)	11	11	12			3
Report

==== Group D ====
Player	Pld	W	L	GF	GA	PF	PA	Points
Padasak Tanviriyavechakul (THA)	4	4	0	12	4	169	130	8
Dinh Quang Linh (VIE)	4	3	1	11	3	146	82	7
Muhammad Bima Abdi Negara (INA)	4	2	2	8	7	137	131	6
Lim Sok Long (CAM)	4	1	3	4	9	100	113	5
Vongdalasinh Seng Arthid (LAO)	4	0	4	0	12	63	132	4

21 Aug 9:30 - Table 2
Name	1	2	3	4	5	Match
Dinh Quang Linh (VIE)	11	11	11			3
Vongdalasinh Seng Arthid (LAO)	2	6	4			0
Report

21 Aug 9:30 - Table 4
Name	1	2	3	4	5	Match
Muhammad Bima Abdi Negara (INA)	7	11	11	11		3
Lim Sok Long (CAM)	11	3	4	5		1
Report

21 Aug 11:30 - Table 3
Name	1	2	3	4	5	Match
Padasak Tanviriyavechakul (THA)	11	11	11			3
Vongdalasinh Seng Arthid (LAO)	3	7	3			0
Report

21 Aug 11:30 - Table 1
Name	1	2	3	4	5	Match
Dinh Quang Linh (VIE)	11	11	11			3
Muhammad Bima Abdi Negara (INA)	3	8	4			0
Report

21 Aug 14:30 - Table 2
Name	1	2	3	4	5	Match
Padasak Tanviriyavechakul (THA)	11	12	11			3
Lim Sok Long (CAM)	5	10	6			0
Report

21 Aug 14:30 - Table 4
Name	1	2	3	4	5	Match
Muhammad Bima Abdi Negara (INA)	11	11	11			3
Vongdalasinh Seng Arthid (LAO)	7	7	5			0
Report

21 Aug 15:30 - Table 2
Name	1	2	3	4	5	Match
Padasak Tanviriyavechakul (THA)	11	11	15	8	11	3
Muhammad Bima Abdi Negara (INA)	3	13	13	11	9	2
Report

21 Aug 15:30 - Table 4
Name	1	2	3	4	5	Match
Dinh Quang Linh (VIE)	11	11	11			3
Lim Sok Long (CAM)	6	3	1			0
Report

21 Aug 17:00 - Table 2
Name	1	2	3	4	5	Match
Padasak Tanviriyavechakul (THA)	4	8	11	11	11	3
Dinh Quang Linh (VIE)	11	11	7	9	9	2
Report

21 Aug 17:00 - Table 4
Name	1	2	3	4	5	Match
Lim Sok Long (CAM)	11	11	11			3
Vongdalasinh Seng Arthid (LAO)	7	6	6			0
Report

=== Knockout round ===
Semifinals; 22 August 11:00
Gao Ning (SGP)	4
Padasak Tanviriyavechakul (THA)	2
Clarence Chew (SGP)	4
Richard Gonzales (PHI)	1

Gold medal match 22 August 19:00
Gao Ning (SGP)	4
Clarence Chew (SGP)	1

==== Semifinals ====
22 Aug 11:00 - Table 1
Name	1	2	3	4	5	6	7	Match
Gao Ning (SGP)	11	9	11	11	11	11		4
Padasak Tanviriyavechakul (THA)	1	11	3	13	2	7		2
Report

22 Aug 11:00 - Table 2
Name	1	2	3	4	5	6	7	Match
Clarence Chew (SGP)	6	11	12	11	11			4
Richard Gonzales (PHI)	11	2	10	7	4			1
Report

==== Gold Medal Match ====
22 Aug 19:00 - Table 1
Name	1	2	3	4	5	6	7	Match
Gao Ning (SGP)	5	11	11	11	11			4
Clarence Chew (SGP)	11	4	4	5	6			1
Report
