= Judo at the 2017 SEA Games =

Judo competition

- Judo pictogram
- Venue: Kuala Lumpur Convention Centre Hall 5
- Location: Kuala Lumpur, Malaysia
- Date: 26–27 August 2017

The judo competitions at the 2017 SEA Games in Kuala Lumpur were held at Kuala Lumpur Convention Centre.

There were a total of 6 events for the games, events such as Combat above 60kg up to 66kg, Combat above 66kg up to 73kg and combat above 73kg up to 81kg for the men’s event. And as for the women’s consists of combat above 57kg-63kg, combat above 63-70kg, combat above 70kg-78kg. It served as a qualifying event for the 2018 Asian Games in Jakarta and Palembang, Indonesia

== Medalists ==
=== Men ===
Event	Gold	Silver	Bronze
66 kg	Mochammad Syaiful Raharjo; Indonesia	Chong Wei Fu; Malaysia	Shugen Nakano; Philippines
66 kg	Mochammad Syaiful Raharjo; Indonesia	Chong Wei Fu; Malaysia	Surasak Puntanam; Thailand
73 kg	Iksan Apriyadi; Indonesia	Nguyễn Tấn Công; Vietnam	Keisei Nakano; Philippines
73 kg	Iksan Apriyadi; Indonesia	Nguyễn Tấn Công; Vietnam	Mohd Farhan Uzair Fikri; Malaysia
81 kg	Masayuki Terada; Thailand	Horas Manurung; Indonesia	Gary Chow Weng Luen; Singapore
81 kg	Masayuki Terada; Thailand	Horas Manurung; Indonesia	Chittakon Xayasan; Laos

=== Women ===
Event	Gold	Silver	Bronze
63 kg	Kiyomi Watanabe; Philippines	Orapin Senatham; Thailand	Nik Norlydiawati Azman; Malaysia
63 kg	Kiyomi Watanabe; Philippines	Orapin Senatham; Thailand	Nguyễn Thị Hường; Vietnam
70 kg	Mariya Takahashi; Philippines	Surattana Thongsri; Thailand	Nguyễn Thị Diệu Tiên; Vietnam
70 kg	Mariya Takahashi; Philippines	Surattana Thongsri; Thailand	Hevrilia Windawati; Indonesia
78 kg	Nguyễn Thị Như Ý Vietnam	Aye Aye Aung; Myanmar	Nor Izzatul Fazlia Tahir; Malaysia
78 kg	Nguyễn Thị Như Ý Vietnam	Aye Aye Aung; Myanmar	Sydney Sy; Philippines

== Medal table ==
* Host nation (Malaysia)

Rank	Nation	Gold	Silver	Bronze	Total
1	Indonesia	2	1	1	4
2	Philippines	2	0	3	5
3	Thailand	1	2	1	4
4	Vietnam	1	1	2	4
5	Malaysia*	0	1	3	4
6	Myanmar	0	1	0	1
7	Laos	0	0	1	1
7	Singapore	0	0	1	1
Totals (8 entries)		6	6	12	24
