= Triathlon at the 2017 SEA Games =

- Venue: Putrajaya Lake
- Location: Putrajaya, Malaysia
- Date: 21 August 2017

The triathlon competition at the 2017 SEA Games was held at Putrajaya Lake. This competition follows the Olympic triathlon distance: a 1.5 km swim, a 40 km cycle, and a 10 km run.

== Medalists ==
Event	Gold	Silver	Bronze
Men	Nikko Bryan Huelgas; Philippines	John Leerams Chicano; Philippines	Clement Chow Sheng Ren; Singapore
Women	Kim Mangrobang; Philippines	Maria Claire Adorna; Philippines	Irene Chong See Win; Malaysia

== Medal table ==
* Host nation (Malaysia)

Rank	Nation	Gold	Silver	Bronze	Total
1	Philippines (PHI)	2	2	0	4
2	Malaysia (MAS)*	0	0	1	1
2	Singapore (SGP)	0	0	1	1
Totals (3 entries)		2	2	2	6
