= Muay Thai at the 2017 SEA Games =

- Venue: MATRADE Exhibition and Convention Centre
- Location: Kuala Lumpur, Malaysia
- Date: 26–29 August 2017

The Muay Thai competitions at the 2017 SEA Games in Kuala Lumpur took place at MATRADE Exhibition and Convention Centre.

== Medal table ==
* Host nation (Malaysia)

Rank	Nation	Gold	Silver	Bronze	Total
1	Thailand	2	3	0	5
2	Malaysia*	2	1	1	4
3	Cambodia	1	1	2	4
4	Vietnam	0	0	4	4
5	Laos	0	0	2	2
6	Philippines	0	0	1	1
Totals (6 entries)		5	5	10	20

== Medalists ==
=== Men ===
Event	Gold	Silver	Bronze
54 kg	Mohd Ali Yaakub; Malaysia	Surachai Nakthaem; Thailand	Vann Voeurn; Cambodia
54 kg	Mohd Ali Yaakub; Malaysia	Surachai Nakthaem; Thailand	Thongbang Seuaphom; Laos
57 kg	Ain Kamarrudin; Malaysia	Thachtana Luangphon; Thailand	Lao Chetra; Cambodia
57 kg	Ain Kamarrudin; Malaysia	Thachtana Luangphon; Thailand	Nguyễn Trần Duy Nhất; Vietnam
63.5 kg	Khun Dima; Cambodia	Chonlawit Preedasak; Thailand	Ryan Jakiri; Philippines
63.5 kg	Khun Dima; Cambodia	Chonlawit Preedasak; Thailand	Võ Văn Đài; Vietnam
67 kg	Mana Samchaiyaphum; Thailand	Tengku Sharizal Abd Rahman; Malaysia	Latxasak Souliyavong; Laos
67 kg	Mana Samchaiyaphum; Thailand	Tengku Sharizal Abd Rahman; Malaysia	Nguyễn Văn Yên; Vietnam
71 kg	Anueng Khatthamarasri; Thailand	Meun Sophea; Cambodia	Trương Quốc Hưng; Vietnam
71 kg	Anueng Khatthamarasri; Thailand	Meun Sophea; Cambodia	Muhamad Samsi Noor; Malaysia
