= Fencing at the 2017 SEA Games =

- Venue: MATRADE Exhibition and Convention Centre
- Location: Kuala Lumpur, Malaysia
- Date: 21–23 August 2017

The fencing competitions at the 2017 SEA Games in Kuala Lumpur were held at MATRADE Exhibition and Convention Centre in Segambut.

The 2017 Games feature competitions in six individual events (3 events for each gender).

== Events ==
The following events will be contested:

- Danish Haikal
  - Individual
- Foil
  - Individual
- Sabre
  - Individual

== Participation ==
=== Participating nations ===
- Brunei
- Cambodia
- Indonesia
- Laos
- Malaysia
- Myanmar
- Philippines
- Singapore
- Thailand
- Timor-Leste
- Vietnam

== Medal summary ==
=== Medal table ===
* Host nation (Malaysia)

Rank	Nation	Gold	Silver	Bronze	Total
1	Vietnam (VIE)	3	0	3	6
2	Singapore (SGP)	2	0	3	5
3	Philippines (PHI)	1	3	2	6
4	Thailand (THA)	0	3	2	5
5	Indonesia (INA)	0	0	1	1
5	Malaysia (MAS)*	0	0	1	1
Totals (6 entries)		6	6	12	24

=== Medalists ===
Event	Gold	Silver	Bronze
Men's épée	Nguyễn Tiến Nhật; Vietnam	Panthawit Chamcharern; Thailand	Indra Jaya Kusuma; Indonesia
Men's épée	Nguyễn Tiến Nhật; Vietnam	Panthawit Chamcharern; Thailand	Joshua Koh I-Jie; Malaysia
Women's épée	Nguyễn Thị Như Hoa; Vietnam	Hanniel Abella; Philippines	Harlene Raguin; Philippines
Women's épée	Nguyễn Thị Như Hoa; Vietnam	Hanniel Abella; Philippines	Nguyễn Thị Quyên; Vietnam
Men's foil	Brennan Wayne Louie; Philippines	Nathaniel Perez; Philippines	Jet Ng Shang Fei; Singapore
Men's foil	Brennan Wayne Louie; Philippines	Nathaniel Perez; Philippines	Sopanut Mayakarn; Thailand
Women's foil	Amita Berthier; Singapore	Samantha Catantan; Philippines	Maxine Esteban; Philippines
Women's foil	Amita Berthier; Singapore	Samantha Catantan; Philippines	Nicole Mae Wong Hui Shan; Singapore
Men's sabre	Vũ Thành An; Vietnam	Voragun Srinualnad; Thailand	Ahmad Huzaifah Saharudin; Singapore
Men's sabre	Vũ Thành An; Vietnam	Voragun Srinualnad; Thailand	Nguyễn Xuân Lợi; Vietnam
Women's sabre	Lau Ywen; Singapore	Pornsawan Ngernrungruangroj; Thailand	Bùi Thị Thu Hà; Vietnam
Women's sabre	Lau Ywen; Singapore	Pornsawan Ngernrungruangroj; Thailand	Tonpan Pokeaw; Thailand
