= Boxing at the 2014 Asian Games – Men's 56 kg =

Asian Games Boxing competitions

Men's 56 kg at the 2014 Asian Games
- Venue: Seonhak Gymnasium
- Date: 24 September – 3 October 2014
- Competitors: 21 from 21 nations

Medalists
gold medal	Ham Sang-myeong	South Korea
silver medal	Zhang Jiawei	China
bronze medal	Kairat Yeraliyev	Kazakhstan
bronze medal	Mario Fernandez	Philippines

The men's bantamweight (56 kilograms) event at the 2014 Asian Games took place from 24 September to 3 October 2014 at Seonhak Gymnasium, Incheon, South Korea.

== Schedule ==
All times are Korea Standard Time (UTC+09:00)

Date	Time	Event
Wednesday, 24 September 2014	14:00	Preliminaries 1
Friday, 26 September 2014	14:00	Preliminaries 2
Monday, 30 September 2014	14:00	Quarterfinals
Thursday, 2 October 2014	19:00	Semifinals
Friday, 3 October 2014	14:00	Final

== Results ==
Legend

- TKOI — Won by technical knockout injury
- WO — Won by walkover

=== Final ===
Final
Ham Sang-myeong (KOR)	3
Zhang Jiawei (CHN)	0

=== Top half ===
Preliminaries 1

Preliminaries 2
Kairat Yeraliyev (KAZ)	WO
Othman Arbabi (QAT)
Mohammad Al-Wadi (JOR)	2
Asror Vokhidov (TJK)	1
Ýakub Meredow (TKM)	0
Nyambayaryn Tögstsogt (MGL)	3
Kwon Chol-guk (PRK)	0
Ham Sang-myeong (KOR)	3

Quarterfinals
Kairat Yeraliyev (KAZ)	3
Mohammad Al-Wadi (JOR)	0
Nyambayaryn Tögstsogt (MGL)	0
Ham Sang-myeong (KOR)	3

Semifinals
Kairat Yeraliyev (KAZ)	0
Ham Sang-myeong (KOR)	3

=== Bottom half ===
Preliminaries 1
Murodjon Akhmadaliev (UZB)	0
Zhang Jiawei (CHN)	3
Shiva Thapa (IND)	WO
Leonel Parada (TLS)
Sigyel Phub (BHU)	1
Nadir Baloch (PAK)	2
Donchai Thathi (THA)	0
Mario Fernandez (PHI)	3
Puran Rai (NEP)	3
Yahya Sharahili (KSA)	0

Preliminaries 2
Li Yu-che (TPE)	0
Omurbek Malabekov (KGZ)	3
Kenji Fujita (JPN)	0
Zhang Jiawei (CHN)	3
Shiva Thapa (IND)	TKOI
Nadir Baloch (PAK)
Mario Fernandez (PHI)	3
Puran Rai (NEP)	0

Quarterfinals
Omurbek Malabekov (KGZ)	1
Zhang Jiawei (CHN)	2
Shiva Thapa (IND)	0
Mario Fernandez (PHI)	3

Semifinals
Zhang Jiawei (CHN)	3
Mario Fernandez (PHI)	0
