= Ham Sang-myeong =

South Korean boxer (born 1995)

Ham Sang-myeong 함상명
Personal information
- Born: 10 November 1995 (age 30) Siheung, Gyeonggi-do, South Korea

Korean name
- Hangul: 함상명
- RR: Ham Sangmyeong
- MR: Ham Sangmyŏng
- IPA: [ham.saŋ.mjʌŋ]

Boxing career
Medal record
Men's amateur boxing
Representing South Korea
Asian Games
Gold medal – first place	2014 Incheon	Bantamweight

Ham Sang-myeong (Korean: 함상명; born 10 November 1995) is a South Korean boxer. He competed in the men's bantamweight event at the 2016 Summer Olympics, where he managed to each the quarterfinals .
