= Boxing at the 2017 SEA Games =

Boxing competitions

- Venue: MATRADE Exhibition and Convention Centre
- Location: Kuala Lumpur, Malaysia
- Date: 20–24 August 2017
- Nations: 10

The boxing competitions at the 2017 SEA Games in Kuala Lumpur were held at MATRADE Exhibition and Convention Centre in Segambut.

The 2017 Games will feature competitions in six events (all events for men).

== Events ==
The following events will be contested:

- Light flyweight (49kg)
- Flyweight (52kg)
- Bantamweight (56kg)
- Light welterweight (64kg)
- Middleweight (75kg)
- Light heavyweight (81kg)

== Participation ==
=== Participating nations ===
- Cambodia (4)
- Indonesia (6)
- Laos (4)
- Malaysia (5)
- Myanmar (4)
- Philippines (6)
- Singapore (4)
- Thailand (6)
- Timor-Leste (4)
- Vietnam (6)

== Medal summary ==
=== Medal table ===
* Host nation (Malaysia)

Rank	Nation	Gold	Silver	Bronze	Total
1	Thailand (THA)	2	3	1	6
2	Philippines (PHI)	2	1	2	5
3	Indonesia (INA)	1	1	1	3
3	Malaysia (MAS)*	1	1	1	3
5	Singapore (SGP)	0	0	3	3
6	Laos (LAO)	0	0	2	2
7	Cambodia (CAM)	0	0	1	1
7	Vietnam (VIE)	0	0	1	1
Totals (8 entries)		6	6	12	24

=== Men's events ===
Event	Gold	Silver	Bronze
Light flyweight	Muhammad Fuad Redzuan; Malaysia	Thani Narinram; Thailand	Huỳnh Ngọc Tân; Vietnam
Light flyweight	Muhammad Fuad Redzuan; Malaysia	Thani Narinram; Thailand	Lasavongsy Bounpone; Laos
Flyweight	Aldoms Suguro; Indonesia	Tanes Ongjunta; Thailand	Mohamed Hanurdeen Hamid; Singapore
Flyweight	Aldoms Suguro; Indonesia	Tanes Ongjunta; Thailand	Ian Clark Bautista; Philippines
Bantamweight	Chatchai Butdee; Thailand	Mario Fernandez; Philippines	Vilaysack Chansamone; Laos
Bantamweight	Chatchai Butdee; Thailand	Mario Fernandez; Philippines	Nak Siek Nin; Cambodia
Light welterweight	Wuttichai Masuk; Thailand	Sarohatua Lumban Tobing; Indonesia	Leong Jun Hao; Singapore
Light welterweight	Wuttichai Masuk; Thailand	Sarohatua Lumban Tobing; Indonesia	Charly Suarez; Philippines
Middleweight	Eumir Felix Marcial; Philippines	Pathomsak Kuttiya; Thailand	Richard Oscar Laim; Indonesia
Middleweight	Eumir Felix Marcial; Philippines	Pathomsak Kuttiya; Thailand	Indran Rama Krishnan; Malaysia
Light heavyweight	John Marvin; Philippines	Adli Hafid Mohd Pauz; Malaysia	Muhammad Dinie Hakeem; Singapore
Light heavyweight	John Marvin; Philippines	Adli Hafid Mohd Pauz; Malaysia	Anavat Thongkrathok; Thailand
