= Weightlifting at the 2017 SEA Games =

- Venue: MATRADE Exhibition and Convention Centre Hall 3
- Location: Kuala Lumpur, Malaysia
- Date: 28–30 August 2017

The weightlifting competitions at the 2017 SEA Games in Kuala Lumpur will take place at Kuala Lumpur Convention Centre.

== Events ==
Five sets of medals were awarded in the following events:

- 56 kg Men
- 62 kg Men
- 69 kg Men
- 77 kg Men
- 85 kg Men

== Medalists ==
=== Men ===
Event	Gold		Silver		Bronze	
56 kg	Thạch Kim Tuấn; Vietnam	269	Surahmat bin Suwoto Wijoyo; Indonesia	267	Witoon Mingmoon; Thailand	259
62 kg	Trịnh Văn Vinh; Vietnam	307 GR	Eko Yuli Irawan; Indonesia	306	Myint Kyi; Myanmar	284
69 kg	Deni; Indonesia	312	Tairat Bunsuk; Thailand	310	Phạm Tuấn Anh; Vietnam	306
77 kg	I Ketut Ariana; Indonesia	325	Nguyễn Hồng Ngọc; Vietnam	307	Loro Wellkinson Peuji; Malaysia	295
85 kg	Pornchai Lapsi; Thailand	337	Mohamad Fazrul Azrie Mohdad; Malaysia	323	Hoàng Tấn Tài; Vietnam	322

== Medal table ==
Host nation

Rank	Nation	Gold	Silver	Bronze	Total
1	Indonesia	2	2	0	4
2	Vietnam	2	1	2	5
3	Thailand	1	1	1	3
4	Malaysia*	0	1	1	2
5	Myanmar	0	0	1	1
Totals (5 entries)		5	5	5	15

== See also ==
- Powerlifting at the 2017 ASEAN Para Games
