= John Marvin (boxer) =

Filipino boxer (born 1993)

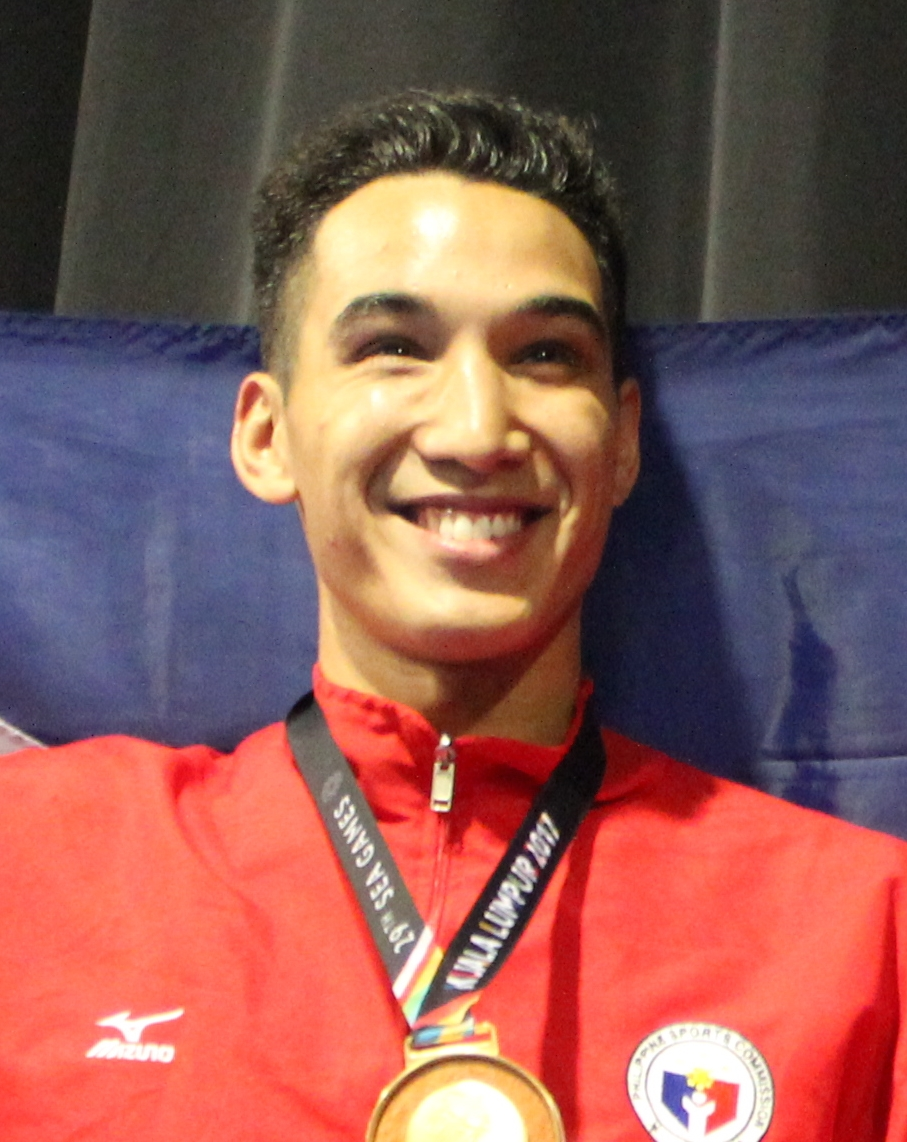

Personal information
- Full name: John Nobel Tupas Marvin
- Citizenship: United Kingdom / Philippines
- Born: 14 January 1993 (age 33)
- Height: 1.84 m (6 ft 0 in)

Sport
- Country: Philippines
- Sport: Boxing
- Weight class: Light heavyweight
- Club: Ventnor Club (c.2010)
- Team: British Army
Medal record
Men's amateur boxing
Representing the Philippines
Asian Championships
Silver medal – second place	2019 Bangkok	Light heavyweight
Southeast Asian Games
Gold medal – first place	2017 Kuala Lumpur	Light heavyweight
Silver medal – second place	2023 Cambodia	Light heavyweight
- Military career
- Allegiance: United Kingdom
- Branch: British Army
- Service years: 2010s-present
- Rank: Lance corporal
- Unit: Princess of Wales’s Royal regiment

John Nobel Tupas Marvin (born 14 January 1993) is an English-Filipino amateur boxer who is a native of the Isle of Wight in England. He has represented the Philippines in boxing internationally.

== Boxing career ==
=== Early career ===
In 2010, Marvin used to fight with others after school for fun but the police had to intervene in one fight and Marvin was told to take up his fight to a boxing gym. He joined the Ventnor Club and trained under coach Darren Green.

He later joined the military where he further pursued boxing. After winning the Army Individuals Championship where he knocked out his semifinals and finals opponents in the second round, he was invited to the boxing team of the British Army in 2014. By August 2017, he is a two-time Combined Services Senior Boxing champion and had an amateur record of 23 wins, 11 of which are by knockouts, and 11 losses.

=== International career ===
He met up with members of the Philippine boxing team in 2016 in a boxing show in Sweden or Finland. Upon mentioning his Filipino heritage, Marvin was told he could represent the country if he holds dual citizenship. He acquired Filipino citizenship and became eligible to box for the country. There is a lack of national boxers fighting in the welterweight to light heavyweight division in the Philippines and it helped that Marvin fights in the light heavyweight division. Marvin is the first Filipino with foreign heritage absorbed to the Philippine national team since Christopher Camat, who competed at the 2004 Summer Olympics.

He went to Guangzhou in July 2017 to train with his countrymen along with Chinese, Kazakh, and South Korean boxers before competing at the 2017 Southeast Asian Games. He won a gold medal at the Games by winning over Adli Hafidz Mohamad Pauzi of Malaysia 21 seconds into the gold medal match.

== Military career ==
As of 2017, he holds the rank, Lance Corporal in the British Army and is assigned to the Princess of Wales' Royal Regiment.

== Personal life ==
Marvin was born to John Sr., a British retired professional singer, former cruise director and a yacht master, and Teresita Tupas, a Filipina who is native to Pampanga. He has a younger brother who is with the merchant navy. During his childhood, he made frequent visits to his mother's homeland with his family until around 2006. He would visit the Philippines again in 2017 when he joined the national boxing team of the country. in January 2021 he appeared before the Isle of Wight magistrates court and was given a suspended sentence and convicted of ABH and beating up women. https://www.countypress.co.uk/news/19036581.isle-wight-army-boxer-spared-jail-string-assaults/
