= Mario Fernandez (boxer) =

Filipino boxer (born 1993)

Personal information
- Nationality: Filipino
- Born: July 13, 1993 (age 32) Valencia, Bukidnon, Philippines
- Weight: Bantamweight

Boxing career
Medal record
Men's Boxing
Representing the Philippines
Asian Games
Bronze medal – third place	2014 Incheon	Bantamweight
Southeast Asian Games
Gold medal – first place	2013 Naypyidaw	Bantamweight
Gold medal – first place	2015 Singapore	Bantamweight
Silver medal – second place	2017 Kuala Lumpur	Bantamweight

Mario Fernandez (born July 13, 1993) is a Filipino boxer, who competes in the Bantamweight division. He represented the Philippines at the 2014 Asian Games and won the bronze medal in the event. Fernandez is a southpaw and a technical fighter with good footwork, speed and has a decent power in both hands.

Mario Fernandez is a multiple medalist of the South East Asian Games boxing Event in the Bantamweight Division.
