= Aye Aye Aung (judoka) =

Burmese Olympic judoka

Aye Aye Aung (born 2 December 1984 in Yangon, Myanmar) is a Burmese judoka. She competed at the 2012 Summer Olympics in the -78 kg event.
