= Vietnam at the 2017 SEA Games =

Vietnam at the 2017 Southeast Asian Games
- IOC code: VIE
- NOC: Vietnam Olympic Committee
- Website: www.voc.org.vn (in Vietnamese and English)

in Malaysia
- Medals Ranked 3rd: Gold 59 Silver 49 Bronze 60 Total 168

Southeast Asian Games appearances (overview)
- 1989; 1991; 1993; 1995; 1997; 1999; 2001; 2003; 2005; 2007; 2009; 2011; 2013; 2015; 2017; 2019; 2021; 2023; 2025; 2027; 2029

Vietnam competed at the 2017 Southeast Asian Games in Malaysia from 19 to 30 August 2017.

== Medal summary ==
=== Medal by sport ===
Medals by sport
Sport	1st place, gold medalist(s)	2nd place, silver medalist(s)	3rd place, bronze medalist(s)	Total	Rank
Archery	1	2	2	5	(3)
Athletics	17	11	6	34	(1)
Badminton	0	0	2	2	(4)
Billiards and snooker	0	1	2	3	(6)
Boxing	0	0	1	1	(7)
Cycling	2	0	2	4	(4)
Diving	0	0	2	2	(4)
Fencing	3	0	3	6	(1)
Football	1	0	0	1	(2)
Futsal	0	1	1	2	(2)
Gymnastics	5	4	0	9	(2)
Judo	1	1	2	4	(4)
Karate	5	3	6	14	(2)
Muaythai	0	0	4	4	(4)
Pencak silat	4	6	2	12	(2)
Pétanque	1	0	4	5	(5)
Sepak takraw	0	1	1	2	(7)
Shooting	1	3	0	4	(4)
Swimming	10	7	6	23	(2)
Table tennis	1	0	2	3	(3)
Taekwondo	2	4	3	9	(3)
Tennis	0	0	2	2	(4)
Volleyball	0	0	2	2	(3)
Weightlifting	2	1	2	5	(2)
Wushu	3	4	3	10	(2)
Total	58	50	60	168	-

=== Medal by date ===
Medals by date
Day	Date	1st place, gold medalist(s)	2nd place, silver medalist(s)	3rd place, bronze medalist(s)	Total
–3	16 August	0	1	0	1
–2	17 August	0	1	0	1
–1	18 August	0	0	1	1
0	19 August	0	1	0	1
1	20 August	4	0	3	7
2	21 August	4	2	4	10
3	22 August	8	6	11	25
4	23 August	12	8	4	24
5	24 August	10	6	9	25
6	25 August	6	4	2	12
7	26 August	7	5	8	20
8	27 August	2	4	7	13
9	28 August	2	3	7	12
10	29 August	3	10	2	15
11	30 August	0	0	1	1
Total		58	50	60	168

=== Medalists ===
Medal	Name	Sport	Event	Date
Gold	Dương Thúy Vi	Wushu	Women's jianshu (sword)	20 August 2017
Gold	Hoàng Thị Phương Giang	Wushu	Women's gun shu (cudgel)	20 August 2017
Gold	Chu Đức Anh	Archery	Men's individual recurve	20 August 2017
Gold	Đặng Nam; Đinh Phương Thành; Đỗ Vũ Hưng; Lê Thanh Tùng; Phạm Phước Hưng; Trần Đình Vương	Gymnastics	Men's artistic team all-around	20 August 2017
Gold	Dương Thúy Vi	Wushu	Women's qiang shu (spear)	21 August 2017
Gold	Nguyễn Thị Thật	Cycling	Women's criterium	21 August 2017
Gold	Vũ Thành An	Fencing	Men's sabre	21 August 2017
Gold	Nguyễn Thị Ánh Viên	Swimming	Women's 100 m backstroke	21 August 2017
Gold	Đặng Nam	Gymnastics	Men's rings	22 August 2017
Gold	Nguyễn Thị Như Hoa	Fencing	Women's épée	22 August 2017
Gold	Nguyễn Thị Hồng Anh	Karate	Women's kumite 68 kg	22 August 2017
Gold	Nguyễn Thị Thi	Pétanque	Women's single pétanque	22 August 2017
Gold	Nguyễn Thị Ánh Viên	Swimming	Women's 200 m backstroke	22 August 2017
Gold	Nguyễn Thị Ánh Viên	Swimming	Women's 400 m freestyle	22 August 2017
Gold	Nguyễn Thị Huyền	Athletics	Women's 400 metres hurdles	22 August 2017
Gold	Lê Tú Chinh	Athletics	Women's 100 metres	22 August 2017
Gold	Lê Thanh Tùng	Gymnastics	Men's vault	23 August 2017
Gold	Đinh Phương Thành	Gymnastics	Men's parallel bars	23 August 2017
Gold	Lê Thanh Tùng	Gymnastics	Men's horizontal bar	23 August 2017
Gold	Nguyễn Thị Thật	Cycling	Women's mass start	23 August 2017
Gold	Hà Minh Thành	Shooting	Men's 25m rapid fire pistol	23 August 2017
Gold	Nguyễn Tiến Nhật	Fencing	Men's épée	23 August 2017
Gold	Vũ Thị Mến	Athletics	Women's triple jump	23 August 2017
Gold	Hồ Thị Thu Hiền	Karate	Women's kumite -68 kg	23 August 2017
Gold	Nguyễn Minh Phụng	Karate	Men's kumite +75 kg	23 August 2017
Gold	Vũ Thị Ly	Athletics	Women's 800 metres	23 August 2017
Gold	Dương Văn Thái	Athletics	Men's 800 metres	23 August 2017
Gold	Lê Tú Chinh	Athletics	Women's 200 metres	23 August 2017
Gold	Nguyễn Thị Oanh	Athletics	Women's 1500 metres	24 August 2017
Gold	Lê Thị Nghi; Nguyễn Thị Hằng; Nguyễn Thị Phương	Karate	Women's kata team	24 August 2017
Gold	Dương Văn Thái	Athletics	Men's 1500 metres	24 August 2017
Gold	Nguyễn Minh Phụng; Hồ Quang Vũ; Lê Minh Thuận; Nguyễn Văn Hải; Phạm Minh Nhựt	Karate	Men's kumite team	24 August 2017
Gold	Nguyễn Thị Ánh Viên	Swimming	Women's 200 m individual medley	24 August 2017
Gold	Nguyễn Thị Ánh Viên	Swimming	Women's 800 m freestyle	24 August 2017
Gold	Nguyễn Thị Huyền	Athletics	Women's 400 metres	24 August 2017
Gold	Bùi Văn Đông	Athletics	Men's long jump	24 August 2017
Gold	Dương Thị Việt Anh	Athletics	Women's high jump	24 August 2017
Gold	Đặng Thị Kiều Trinh; Nguyễn Thị Xuyến; Chương Thị Kiều; Vũ Thị Thúy; Bùi Thị Như; Vũ Thị Nhung; Nguyễn Thị Tuyết Dung; Nguyễn Thị Liễu; Trần Thị Thùy Trang; Nguyễn Thị Nguyệt; Phạm Hải Yến; Nguyễn Thị Muôn; Trần Thị Kim Thanh; Nguyễn Thị Bích Thùy; Nguyễn Hải Hòa; Nguyễn Thị Vạn; Huỳnh Như; Bùi Thúy An; Nguyễn Thị Thanh Hảo; Trần Thị Hồng Nhung	Football	Women's team	24 August 2017
Gold	Lê Thị Mộng Tuyền; Đỗ Thị Quyền; Trần Thị Yến Hoa; Lê Tú Chinh	Athletics	Women's 4 × 100 m relay	25 August 2017
Gold	Nguyễn Thị Oanh	Athletics	Women's 5000 metres	25 August 2017
Gold	Bùi Thị Thu Thảo	Athletics	Women's long jump	25 August 2017
Gold	Nguyễn Thị Ánh Viên	Swimming	Women's 200 m individual medley	25 August 2017
Gold	Nguyễn Thị Ánh Viên	Swimming	Women's 50 m backstroke	25 August 2017
Gold	Nguyễn Hữu Kim Sơn	Swimming	Men's 400 m individual medley	25 August 2017
Gold	Trần Thị Yến Hoa	Athletics	Women's 100 metres hurdles	26 August 2017
Gold	Nguyễn Văn Lai	Athletics	Men's 5000 metres	26 August 2017
Gold	Châu Tuyết Vân; Liên Thị Tuyết Mai; Nguyễn Thị Lệ Kim	Taekwondo	Women's poomsae team	26 August 2017
Gold	Nguyễn Huy Hoàng	Swimming	Men's 1500 m freestyle	26 August 2017
Gold	Nguyễn Thị Ánh Viên	Swimming	Women's 200 m freestyle	26 August 2017
Gold	Nguyễn Thị Oanh; Quách Thị Lan; Hoàng Thị Ngọc; Nguyễn Thị Huyền	Athletics	Women's 4 × 400 m relay	26 August 2017
Gold	Bùi Tuấn Anh; Đinh Quang Linh; Nguyễn Anh Tú; Đoàn Bá Tuấn Anh; Trần Tuấn Quỳnh	Table tennis	Men's team	26 August 2017
Gold	Hà Thị Nguyên	Taekwondo	Women's kyorugi -62 kg	27 August 2017
Gold	Nguyễn Thị Như Ý	Judo	Women's 78 kg	27 August 2017
Gold	Thạch Kim Tuấn	Weightlifting	Men's 56 kg	28 August 2017
Gold	Trịnh Văn Vinh	Weightlifting	Men's 62 kg	28 August 2017
Silver	Châu Kiều Oanh	Archery	Women's individual compound	16 August 2017
Silver	Châu Kiều Oanh; Nguyễn Thị Nhật Lệ; Lê Ngọc Huyền	Archery	Women's team compound	17 August 2017
Silver	Hoàng Thị Thanh	Athletics	Women's marathon	19 August 2017
Silver	Phạm Quốc Khánh	Wushu	Men's nandao+nan gun	21 August 2017
Silver	Lê Thị Mỹ Thảo	Swimming	Women's 200 m butterfly	21 August 2017
Silver	Phạm Quốc Khánh	Wushu	Men's nanquan	22 August 2017
Silver	Nguyễn Thùy Linh	Wushu	Women's nandao+nan gun	22 August 2017
Silver	Phạm Phước Hưng	Gymnastics	Men's rings	22 August 2017
Silver	Trần Xuân Hiệp	Wushu	Men's changquan	22 August 2017
Silver	Quách Công Lịch	Athletics	Men's 400 m hurdles	22 August 2017
Silver	Bùi Thị Xuân	Athletics	Women's Javelin throw	22 August 2017
Silver	Phạm Phước Hưng	Gymnastics	Men's parallel bars	23 August 2017
Silver	Đinh Phương Thành	Gymnastics	Men's horizontal bar	23 August 2017
Silver	Trang Cẩm Lành	Karate	Women's kumite -55 kg	23 August 2017
Silver	Phan Thị Bích Hà	Athletics	Women's 20 km walk	23 August 2017
Silver	Chu Đức Thịnh	Karate	Men's kumite -75 kg	23 August 2017
Silver	Nguyễn Thị Ánh Viên	Swimming	Women's 200 m freestyle	23 August 2017
Silver	Hoàng Quý Phước	Swimming	Men's 200 m freestyle	23 August 2017
Silver	Khuất Phương Anh	Athletics	Women's 800 metres	23 August 2017
Silver	Lê Thị Linh Chi	Shooting	Women's 10 m air pistol	24 August 2017
Silver	Vũ Thị Ly	Athletics	Women's 1500 metres	24 August 2017
Silver	Nguyễn Thị Hồng Anh; Nguyễn Thị Ngoan; Bùi Thị Ngọc Hân	Karate	Women's kumite team	24 August 2017
Silver	Hoàng Quý Phước	Swimming	Men's 100 m freestyle	24 August 2017
Silver	Hoàng Quý Phước; Nguyễn Huy Hoàng; Trần Tấn Triệu; Phạm Thành Bảo	Swimming	Men's 4 × 200 m freestyle relay	24 August 2017
Silver	Phạm Thị Huệ	Athletics	Women's 10000 metres	24 August 2017
Silver	Nguyễn Duy Hoàng	Shooting	Men's 50 m rifle 3 positions	25 August 2017
Silver	Phạm Thị Huệ	Athletics	Women's 5000 metres	25 August 2017
Silver	Nguyễn Thị Ánh Viên	Swimming	Women's 200 m breaststroke	25 August 2017
Silver	Nguyễn Văn Lai	Athletics	Men's 10000 metres	25 August 2017
Silver	Hoàng Xuân Vinh	Shooting	Men's 10 m air pistol	26 August 2017
Silver	Nguyễn Tấn Công	Judo	Men's 73 kg	26 August 2017
Silver	Lâm Quang Nhật	Swimming	Men's 1500 m freestyle	26 August 2017
Silver	Phạm Tiến Sản	Athletics	Men's 3000 metres steeplechase	26 August 2017
Silver	Lương Văn Thảo; Phan Khắc Hoàng; Trần Đình Sơn; Quách Công Lịch	Athletics	Men's 4 × 400 m relay	26 August 2017
Silver	Hoang Thi Hoa; Nguyen Thi Quyen; Nguyen Thi My	Sepak takraw	Women's doubles	27 August 2017
Silver	Do Thi Nguyen; Le Thi Thuy Linh; Ngo Nguyen Thuy Linh; Nguyen Thi Chau; Nguyen Thi Hanh; Nguyen Thi Hue; Nguyen Thi Thanh; Pham Thi Tuoi; Pho Ngoc Thanh Thy; Thai Thi Thao; Tran Thi Thu; Trinh Ngoc Hoa; Trinh Nguyen Thanh Hang; Truong Kim Ngan	Futsal	Women's team	27 August 2017
Silver	Phạm Thị Thu Hiền	Taekwondo	Women's kyorugi featherweight 57 kg	27 August 2017
Silver	Dương Quốc Hoàng	Billiards and snooker	Men's 9-ball pool singles	27 August 2017
Silver	Lê Việt Trinh; Nguyễn Hồng Nhung; Phạm Nguyễn Vân Nhi; Trịnh Hương Giang; Trương Mai Nhật Linh	Gymnastics	Rhythmic 3 Balls + 2 Ropes	28 August 2017
Silver	Võ Quốc Hưng	Taekwondo	Men's kyorugi finweight 54 kg	28 August 2017
Silver	Trương Thị Kim Tuyền	Taekwondo	Women's kyorugi featherweight 46 kg	28 August 2017
Bronze	Châu Kiều Oanh; Nguyễn Tiến Cương	Archery	Mixed team compound	18 August 2017
Bronze	Nguyễn Thục Anh	Wushu	Women's nanquan	20 August 2017
Bronze	Mai Hoàng Mỹ Trang; Đinh Quang Linh	Table tennis	Mixed doubles	20 August 2017
Bronze	Mai Hoàng Mỹ Trang; Nguyễn Thị Nga	Table tennis	Women's doubles	20 August 2017
Bronze	Nguyễn Xuân Lợi	Fencing	Men's sabre	21 August 2017
Bronze	Lê Nguyễn Paul	Swimming	Men's 50 m backstroke	21 August 2017
Bronze	Nguyễn Hữu Kim Sơn	Swimming	Men's 400 m freestyle	21 August 2017
Bronze	Lê Nguyễn Paul	Swimming	Men's 50 m butterfly	21 August 2017
Bronze	Nguyễn Thục Anh	Wushu	Women's nandao+nan gun	22 August 2017
Bronze	Lộc Thị Đào; Chu Đức Anh	Archery	Mixed team recurve	22 August 2017
Bronze	Mai Nguyễn Hưng; Nguyễn Trường Tài; Huỳnh Thanh Tùng; Trịnh Đức Tâm	Cycling	Men's team time trial	22 August 2017
Bronze	Huỳnh Ngọc Tân	Boxing	Men's light flyweight	22 August 2017
Bronze	Trần Thị Khánh Vy	Karate	Women's kumite -50 kg	22 August 2017
Bronze	Nguyễn Thanh Duy	Karate	Men's kumite -60 kg	22 August 2017
Bronze	Nguyễn Thị Hằng	Karate	Women's individual	22 August 2017
Bronze	Nguyễn Văn Nhật	Karate	Men's kumite -67 kg	22 August 2017
Bronze	Hoàng Thị Phương Giang	Wushu	Women's changquan	22 August 2017
Bronze	Nguyễn Thị Quyên	Fencing	Women's épée	22 August 2017
Bronze	Sơn Khớp	Pétanque	Men's single pétanque	22 August 2017
Bronze	Nguyễn Thị Ngoan	Karate	Women's kumite 61 kg	23 August 2017
Bronze	Bùi Thị Thu Hà	Fencing	Women's sabre	23 August 2017
Bronze	Bùi Văn Sự	Athletics	Men's Decathlon	23 August 2017
Bronze	Nguyễn Thanh Bình; Trần Lê Anh Tuấn	Billiards and snooker	Men's English billiards doubles	23 August 2017
Bronze	Mai Nguyễn Hưng	Cycling	Men's road race	24 August 2017
Bronze	Lý Hoàng Nam	Tennis	Men's singles	24 August 2017
Bronze	Lý Hoàng Nam; Nguyễn Hoàng Thiên	Tennis	Men's doubles	24 August 2017
Bronze	Huỳnh Công Tâm; Nguyễn Văn Dũng	Pétanque	Men's doubles pétanque	24 August 2017
Bronze	Lâm Thị Hồng Thu; Nguyễn Thị Loan	Pétanque	Women's doubles pétanque	24 August 2017
Bronze	Giang Thanh Huy; Giang Việt Anh; Nguyễn Anh Dũng	Karate	Men's kata team	24 August 2017
Bronze	Lê Nguyễn Paul	Swimming	Men's 200 m individual medley	24 August 2017
Bronze	Phạm Thị Hồng Lệ	Athletics	Women's 10000 metres	24 August 2017
Bronze	Quách Công Lịch	Athletics	Men's 400 m	24 August 2017
Bronze	Duong Thi Xuyen; Giap Thi Hien; Nguyen Thi Phuong Trinh; NguyenThi Quyen; Pham Thi Hang; Tran Thi Thu Hoai	Sepak takraw	Women's quadrant	25 August 2017
Bronze	Lê Nguyễn Paul	Swimming	Men's 50 m freestyle	25 August 2017
Bronze	Đào Thị Hồng Hiên; Nguyễn Thị Cẩm Duyên; Nguyễn Thị Thúy Kiều; Nguyễn Thị Trang	Pétanque	Women's triples pétanque	26 August 2017
Bronze	Châu Tuyết Vân; Hồ Thanh Phong	Taekwondo	Mixed pair poomsae	26 August 2017
Bronze	Hồ Thanh Phong; Lê Hiếu Nghĩa; Nguyễn Thiên Phụng	Taekwondo	Men's poomsae team	26 August 2017
Bronze	Nguyễn Thị Hường	Judo	Men's 63 kg	26 August 2017
Bronze	Nguyễn Thành Nhân	Athletics	Men's High jump	26 August 2017
Bronze	Nguyễn Thị Hồng Thương	Athletics	Women's Discus throw	26 August 2017
Bronze	Trần Duy Khôi; Ngô Đình Chuyền; Phạm Thành Bảo; Hoàng Quý Phước	Swimming	Men's 4 × 100 m freestyle relay	26 August 2017
Bronze	Đỗ Quốc Luật	Athletics	Men's 3000 metres steeplechase	26 August 2017
Bronze	Đoàn Thị Xuân; Trần Thị Thanh Thúy; Phạm Thị Kim Huệ; Nguyễn Thị Kim Liên; Nguyễn Thị Ngọc Hoa; Bùi Vũ Thanh Tuyền; Nguyễn Thị Hồng Đào; Nguyễn Linh Chi; Đinh Thị Thúy; Lê Thanh Thúy; Bùi Thị Ngà	Volleyball	Women's team	27 August 2017
Bronze	Nguyễn Anh Tuấn	Billiards and snooker	Men's 9-ball pool singles	27 August 2017
Bronze	Huỳnh Trung Trực; Nguyễn Xuân Thành; Giang Văn Đức; Nguyễn Hoàng Thương; Phạm Thái Hưng; Ngô Văn Kiều; Từ Thanh Thuận; Nguyễn Vũ Hoàng; Lê Thành Hạc; Vũ Hồng Quân; Hoàng Văn Phương; Nguyễn Trường Giang	Volleyball	Men's team	27 August 2017
Bronze	Le Quoc Nam; Mai Thanh Dat; Ngo Dinh Thuan; Ngo Ngoc Son; Nguyen Dinh Y Hoa; Nguyen Manh Dung; Nguyen Minh Tri; Nguyen Thanh Tin; Nguyen Van Huy; Pham Duc Hoa; Phung Trong Luan; Tran Thai Huy; Tran Van Vu; Vu Xuan Du	Futsal	Men's team	27 August 2017
Bronze	Lý Hồng Phúc	Taekwondo	Men's kyorugi -74 kg	27 August 2017
Bronze	Nguyễn Thị Diệu Tiên	Judo	Women's 70 kg	27 August 2017
Bronze	Ngô Phương Mai	Diving	Women's 1 metre springboard	27 August 2017
Bronze	Đinh Thị Phương Hồng; Đỗ Thị Hoài	Badminton	Women's doubles	28 August 2017
Bronze	Nguyễn Trần Duy Nhất	Muaythai	Men's 57 kg	28 August 2017
Bronze	Nguyễn Tiến Minh	Badminton	Men's singles	28 August 2017
Bronze	Võ Văn Đài	Muaythai	Men's 63,5 kg	28 August 2017
Bronze	Nguyễn Văn Yên	Muaythai	Men's 67 kg	28 August 2017
Bronze	Trương Quốc Hưng	Muaythai	Men's 73 kg	28 August 2017
Bronze	Ngô Phương Mai; Vũ Anh Duy	Diving	Mixed 3 metre springboard	28 August 2017

=== Multiple medalists ===
Name	Sport	Gold	Silver	Bronze	Total
Nguyễn Thị Ánh Viên	Swimming	8	2	0	10
Lê Thanh Tùng	Gymnastics	3	0	0	3
Lê Tú Chinh	Athletics	3	0	0	3
Nguyễn Thị Huyền	Athletics	3	0	0	3
Đinh Phương Thành	Gymnastics	2	1	0	3
Dương Thúy Vi	Wushu	2	0	0	2
Đặng Nam	Gymnastics	2	0	0	2
Nguyễn Thị Thật	Cycling	2	0	0	2
Dương Văn Thái	Athletics	2	0	0	2
Nguyễn Minh Phụng	Karate	2	0	0	2
Nguyễn Thị Oanh	Athletics	2	0	0	2
Trần Thị Yến Hoa	Athletics	2	0	0	2
Phạm Phước Hưng	Gymnastics	1	2	0	3
Vũ Thị Ly	Athletics	1	1	0	2
Nguyễn Thị Hồng Anh	Karate	1	1	0	2
Nguyễn Văn Lai	Athletics	1	1	0	2
Chu Đức Anh	Archery	1	0	1	2
Hoàng Thị Phương Giang	Wushu	1	0	1	2
Nguyễn Thị Hằng	Karate	1	0	1	2
Nguyễn Hữu Kim Sơn	Swimming	1	0	1	2
Châu Tuyết Vân	Taekwondo	1	0	1	2
Đinh Quang Linh	Table tennis	1	0	1	2
