= Malaysia at the 2015 World Aquatics Championships =

- Flag of Malaysia
- FINA code: MAS
- National federation: Amateur Swimming Union of Malaysia
- Website: malaysiaswimming.org

in Kazan, Russia
- Competitors: 20 in 4 sports
- Medals Ranked 28th: Gold 0 Silver 0 Bronze 1 Total 1

World Aquatics Championships appearances
- 1973; 1975; 1978; 1982; 1986; 1991; 1994; 1998; 2001; 2003; 2005; 2007; 2009; 2011; 2013; 2015; 2017; 2019; 2022; 2023; 2024

Malaysia competed at the 2015 World Aquatics Championships in Kazan, Russia from 24 July to 9 August 2015.

== Medalists ==
Medal	Name	Sport	Event	Date
Bronze	Pandelela Rinong	Diving	Women's 10 m platform	July 30

== Diving ==
Malaysian divers qualified for the individual spots and the synchronized teams at the World Championships.

Men

Athlete	Event	Preliminaries		Semifinals		Final	
Athlete	Event	Points	Rank	Points	Rank	Points	Rank
Ahmad Azman	3 m springboard	401.25	24	did not advance			
Ooi Tze Liang	3 m springboard	391.35	27	did not advance			
Chew Yi Wei	10 m platform	353.70	35	did not advance			
Ooi Tze Liang	10 m platform	400.75	22	did not advance			
Ahmad Azman; Ooi Tze Liang	3 m synchronized springboard	374.97	11 Q	—		401.37	10
Chew Yi Wei; Ooi Tze Liang	10 m synchronized platform	383.40	11 Q	—		386.52	10

Women

Athlete	Event	Preliminaries		Semifinals		Final	
Athlete	Event	Points	Rank	Points	Rank	Points	Rank
Ng Yan Yee	3 m springboard	294.60	12 Q	296.10	=11 Q	311.10	8
Nur Dhabitah Sabri	3 m springboard	276.65	19	did not advance			
Pandelela Rinong	10 m platform	363.55	3 Q	338.10	8 Q	385.05	3rd place, bronze medalist(s)
Nur Dhabitah Sabri	10 m platform	307.15	18 Q	316.40	14	did not advance	
Ng Yan Yee; Nur Dhabitah Sabri	3 m synchronized springboard	274.11	9 Q	—		294.66	8
Leong Mun Yee; Pandelela Rinong	10 m synchronized platform	311.04	3 Q	—		303.60	7

Mixed

Athlete	Event	Final	
Athlete	Event	Points	Rank
Muhammad Puteh; Ng Yan Yee	3 m synchronized springboard	291.42	7
Chew Yi Wei; Loh Loh Zhiayi	10 m synchronized platform	289.89	10
Chew Yi Wei; Loh Loh Zhiayi	Team	360.50	9

== Open water swimming ==
Malaysia has qualified one swimmer to compete in the open water marathon.

Athlete	Event	Time	Rank
Heidi Gan	Women's 5 km	1:00:52.1	21
Heidi Gan	Women's 10 km	2:00:34.4	33

== Swimming ==
Malaysian swimmers have achieved qualifying standards in the following events (up to a maximum of 2 swimmers in each event at the A-standard entry time, and 1 at the B-standard):

Men

Athlete	Event	Heat		Semifinal		Final	
Athlete	Event	Time	Rank	Time	Rank	Time	Rank
Lim Ching Hwang	100 m freestyle	51.31	62	did not advance			
Welson Sim	200 m freestyle	1:51.65	51	did not advance			
Welson Sim	400 m freestyle	3:58.75	53	—		did not advance	
Welson Sim	800 m freestyle	8:18.20	38	—		did not advance	
Welson Sim	1500 m freestyle	16:09.72	43	—		did not advance	
Tern Jian Han	50 m backstroke	26.73	47	did not advance			
Wong Fu Kang	100 m breaststroke	1:02.89	45	did not advance			

Women

Athlete	Event	Heat		Semifinal		Final	
Athlete	Event	Time	Rank	Time	Rank	Time	Rank
Caroline Chan	50 m backstroke	30.14	37	did not advance			
Chui Lai Kwan	50 m freestyle	26.13	44	did not advance			
Khoo Cai Lin	400 m freestyle	4:18.75	31	—		did not advance	
Khoo Cai Lin	800 m freestyle	8:55.20	31	—		did not advance	
Phee Jinq En	50 m breaststroke	32.37	41	did not advance			
Phee Jinq En	100 m breaststroke	1:11.76	46	did not advance			

== Synchronized swimming ==
Malaysia has qualified one synchronized swimmer in the women's solo events.

Athlete	Event	Preliminaries		Final	
Athlete	Event	Points	Rank	Points	Rank
Lee Yhing Huey	Solo free routine	73.0333	22	did not advance	
