= Malaysia at the 2017 World Aquatics Championships =

- Flag of Malaysia
- FINA code: MAS
- National federation: Amateur Swimming Union of Malaysia
- Website: malaysiaswimming.org

in Budapest, Hungary
- Competitors: 11 in 2 sports
- Medals Ranked 14th: Gold 1 Silver 0 Bronze 1 Total 2

World Aquatics Championships appearances
- 1973; 1975; 1978; 1982; 1986; 1991; 1994; 1998; 2001; 2003; 2005; 2007; 2009; 2011; 2013; 2015; 2017; 2019; 2022; 2023; 2024

Malaysia is scheduled to compete at the 2017 World Aquatics Championships in Budapest, Hungary from 14 July to 30 July. This was the first time Malaysia won gold at the World Aquatics Championships, with Cheong Jun Hoong winning gold in the Women's 10 m platform event.

== Medalists ==
Medal	Name	Sport	Event	Date
Gold	Cheong Jun Hoong	Diving	Women's 10 m platform	July 19
Bronze	Cheong Jun Hoong; Pandelela Rinong	Diving	Women's 10 m synchronized platform	July 17

== Diving ==
Malaysia has entered 8 divers (three male and five female).

Men

Athlete	Event	Preliminaries		Semifinals		Final	
Athlete	Event	Points	Rank	Points	Rank	Points	Rank
Ahmad Azman	1 m springboard	313.00	30	—		did not advance	
Ooi Tze Liang	1 m springboard	325.70	25	—		did not advance	
Ahmad Azman	3 m springboard	311.15	44	did not advance			
Ooi Tze Liang	3 m springboard	385.92	26	did not advance			
Chew Yiwei	10 m platform	323.85	35	did not advance			
Chew Yiwei; Ooi Tze Liang	3 m synchronized springboard	384.69	9 Q	—		370.77	10

Women

Athlete	Event	Preliminaries		Semifinals		Final	
Athlete	Event	Points	Rank	Points	Rank	Points	Rank
Cheong Jun Hoong	1 m springboard	272.75	3 Q	—		252.45	12
Nur Dhabitah Sabri	1 m springboard	242.35	17	—		did not advance	
Ng Yan Yee	3 m springboard	291.10	10 Q	285.30	13	did not advance	
Nur Dhabitah Sabri	3 m springboard	285.10	13 Q	321.70	6 Q	292.35	10
Cheong Jun Hoong	10 m platform	316.70	9 Q	325.50	7 Q	397.50	1st place, gold medalist(s)
Pandelela Rinong	10 m platform	306.00	13 Q	322.75	=8 Q	322.40	9
Ng Yan Yee; Nur Dhabitah Sabri	3 m synchronized springboard	291.54	5 Q	—		288.72	6
Cheong Jun Hoong; Pandelela Rinong	10 m synchronized platform	309.66	4 Q	—		328.74	3rd place, bronze medalist(s)

Mixed

Athlete	Event	Final	
Athlete	Event	Points	Rank
Leong Mun Yee; Ahmad Azman	Team	356.75	5

== Synchronized swimming ==
Malaysia's synchronized swimming team consisted of 3 athletes (3 female).

Women

Athlete	Event	Preliminaries		Final	
Athlete	Event	Points	Rank	Points	Rank
Gan Hua Wei	Solo technical routine	71.3383	24	did not advance	
Lee Yhing Huey	Solo free routine	72.2667	27	did not advance	
Gan Hua Wei; Lee Yhing Huey; Foong Yan Nie (R)	Duet technical routine	73.1753	31	did not advance	
Gan Hua Wei; Lee Yhing Huey; Foong Yan Nie (R)	Duet free routine	73.7333	32	did not advance	

Legend: (R) = Reserve Athlete
