= 2019 SEA Games Parade of Nations =

During the Parade of Nations at the 2019 Southeast Asian Games opening ceremony, beginning at 19:00 PST (UTC+8) on 30 November 2019, athletes bearing the flags of their respective nations led their national delegations as they paraded into the Philippine Arena in Bocaue, Bulacan, preceded by their flag and placard bearer. Each flag bearer was chosen either by the nation's National Olympic Committee or by the athletes themselves. The host country, the Philippines, entered as the last team. 11 Filipina titleholders served as muses for each of the 11 participating countries.

English was used to organize the Parade of Nations as per Southeast Asian Games Federation (SEAGF) protocol.

== List ==
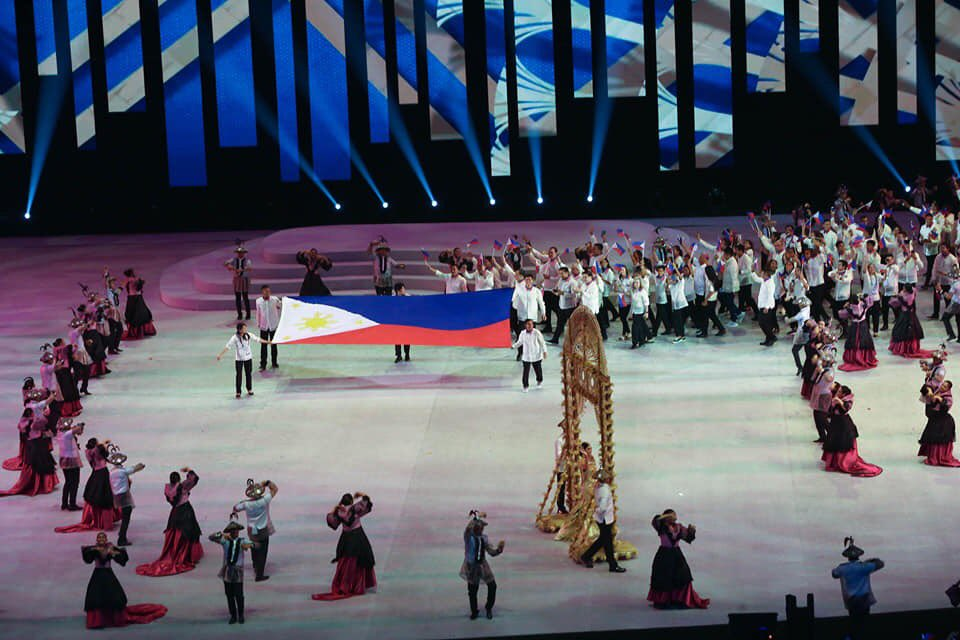
The Philippine delegation.

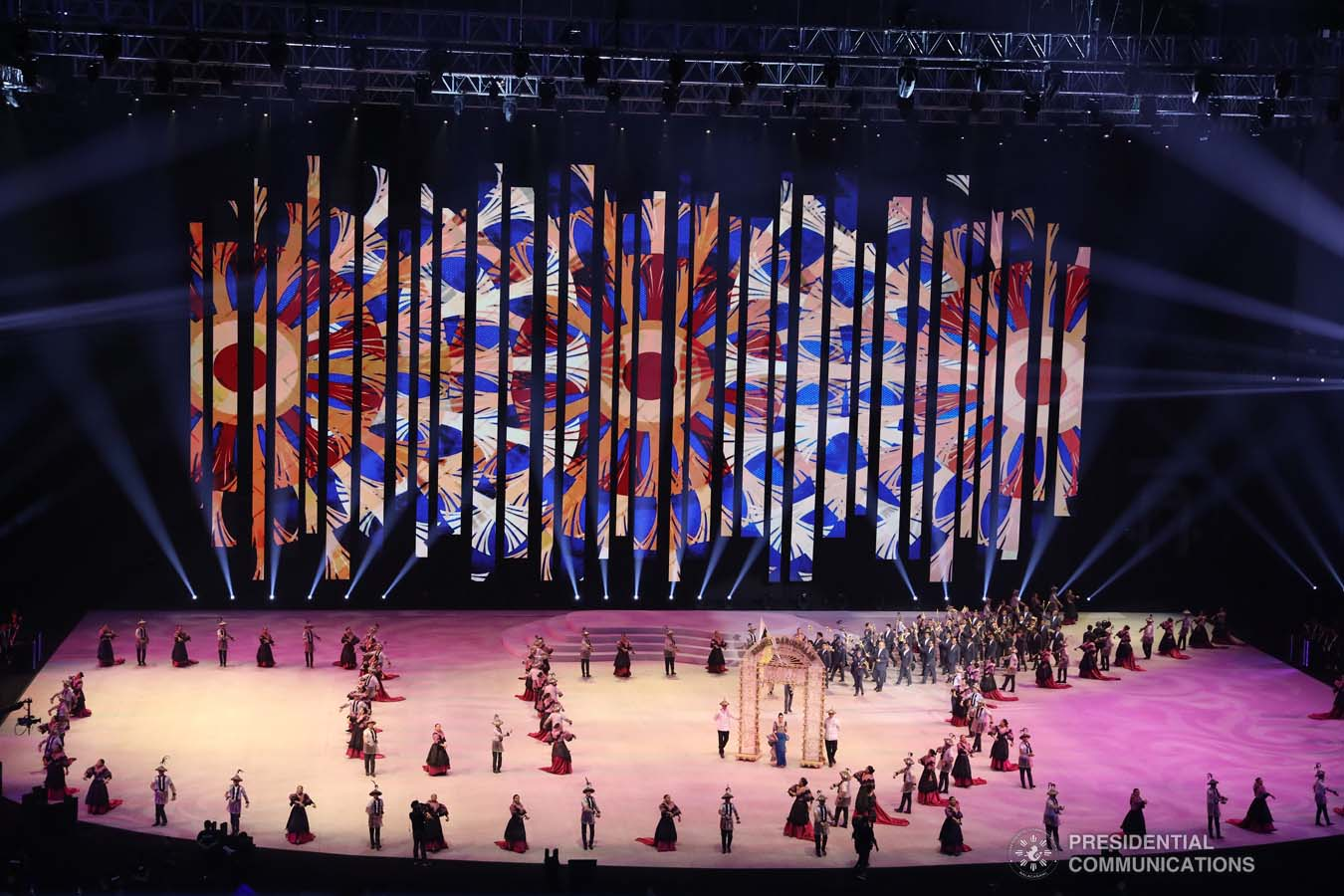
The Brunei Darussalam delegation making their way into the Philippine Arena.

Order	Nation	Muse	Flag bearer/s	Sport
1	Brunei (BRU) (Brunei Darussalam)	Karen Gallman (Miss Intercontinental 2018)	Md Noor Firdaus Ar-Rashid Hj Md Idris	Athletics
2	Cambodia (CAM)	Sophia Senoron (Miss Multinational 2017)	Sorn Seavmey	Taekwondo
3	Indonesia (INA)	Megan Young (Miss World 2013)	Ridjkie Mulia	Water polo
4	Laos (LAO) (Lao PDR)	Cynthia Thomalla (Miss Eco International 2018)		
5	Malaysia (MAS)	Precious Lara Quigaman (Miss International 2005	Rafiq Ismail	Bowling
6	Myanmar (MYA)	Karen Ibasco (Miss Earth 2017)		
7	Singapore (SGP)	Jamie Herrell (Miss Earth 2014)	Samuel Kang	Squash
8	Thailand (THA)	Angelia Ong (Miss Earth 2015)	Napis Tortungpanich	Shooting
9	Timor-Leste (TLS) (Timor-Leste)	Jannie Alipo-on (Miss Tourism International 2017)		
10	Vietnam (VIE)	Sharifa Akeel (Miss Asia Pacific International 2018)	Vũ Thành An	Fencing
11	Philippines (PHI)	Pia Wurtzbach (Miss Universe 2015)	Meggie Ochoa; Margielyn Didal; EJ Obiena; Eumir Marcial; Kiyomi Watanabe	Jujitsu; Skateboarding; Athletics; Boxing; Judo
