= Fong Kay Yian =

Singaporean diver (born 1996)

Personal information
- Born: 5 November 1996 (age 30) Singapore
- Education: Singapore Sports School; Republic Polytechnic; James Cook University Singapore
- Height: 5 ft 3 in (160 cm)

Sport
- Country: Singapore
- Events: 3 m Springboard; 3 m Synchronized Springboard; 1 m Springboard
Medal record
Diving
Representing Singapore
Southeast Asian Games
Gold medal – first place	2017 Kuala Lumpur	3 m synchro springboard
Silver medal – second place	2015 Singapore	3 m synchro springboard
Silver medal – second place	2019 Philippines	3 m synchro springboard
Bronze medal – third place	2013 Naypyidaw	3 m synchro springboard
Bronze medal – third place	2015 Singapore	3 m springboard
Bronze medal – third place	2021 Hanoi	3 m springboard
- Updated on 00:10, 15 May 2022 (UTC+8)

Fong Kay Yian (Chinese: 冯琪茵; born 5 November 1996) is a Singaporean diver.

== Early life and education ==
Fong studied at the Singapore Sports School and graduated from Republic Polytechnic with a Diploma in Sports and Leisure Management. She pursued a Bachelor's degree in Psychological Science at James Cook University Singapore (JCU) and graduated with Honours in July 2022. She was the very first recipient of JCU’s Sports Scholarship.

== Diving career ==
In 2013, Fong took part in the 2013 Asian Youth Games held in Nanjing and was ranked 7th in the 3 m springboard event. In December, she took part in the 2013 Southeast Asian Games along with her partner Myra Lee in the women's synchronized 3 m springboard event which the duo won the bronze medal.

At the 2015 Southeast Asian Games in Singapore, Fong won a silver medal in the women's synchronized 3 m springboard event with her partner Ashlee Tan. She also participated in the women's 3 m springboard event, which she won herself a bronze medal.

At the 2017 Southeast Asian Games in Kuala Lumpur, Fong won the gold medal with Ashlee in the women's 3 m synchronized springboard event, even though the duo finished second, as gold-winning diver Ng Yan Yee failed a doping test which resulted in the Malaysian team being stripped of the gold medal. It was Singapore's first diving title at the Games since Sally Lim captured the women's 3 m springboard gold on home soil at the 1973 Games.

At the 2019 Southeast Asian Games in Philippines, Fong and Ashlee won the silver medal in the women's 3 m synchronized springboard event.

At the 2021 Southeast Asian Games in Hanoi, Fong won a bronze medal in the women's 3 m springboard event. Even though Ashlee and her finished third in the women's synchronized 3 m springboard event, no bronze medal was awarded as only three pairs of divers competed in the event.
