= Diving at the 2014 Asian Games =

- Venue: Munhak Park Tae-hwan Aquatics Center
- Dates: 29 September – 3 October 2014
- Competitors: 61 from 10 nations

Diving at the 2014 Asian Games was held in Incheon, South Korea from September 29 to October 3, 2014. Ten competitions were held in both men's and women's disciplines. All competition took place at the Munhak Park Tae-hwan Aquatics Center.

== Schedule ==
P	Preliminary	F	Final

Event↓/Date →	29th Mon	30th Tue	1st Wed	2nd Thu		3rd Fri	
Men's 1 m springboard			F				
Men's 3 m springboard				P	F		
Men's 10 m platform						P	F
Men's synchronized 3 m springboard		F					
Men's synchronized 10 m platform	F						
Women's 1 m springboard			F				
Women's 3 m springboard						F	
Women's 10 m platform				F			
Women's synchronized 3 m springboard	F						
Women's synchronized 10 m platform		F					

== Medalists ==
=== Men ===
Event	Gold	Silver	Bronze
1 m springboard	He Chao; China	He Chong; China	Woo Ha-ram; South Korea
3 m springboard	Cao Yuan; China	He Chao; China	Sho Sakai; Japan
10 m platform	Qiu Bo; China	Yang Jian; China	Woo Ha-ram; South Korea
Synchronized 3 m springboard	China; Cao Yuan; Lin Yue	Malaysia; Ahmad Amsyar Azman; Ooi Tze Liang	South Korea; Kim Yeong-nam; Woo Ha-ram
Synchronized 10 m platform	China; Zhang Yanquan; Chen Aisen	South Korea; Kim Yeong-nam; Woo Ha-ram	Malaysia; Chew Yiwei; Ooi Tze Liang

=== Women ===
Event	Gold	Silver	Bronze
1 m springboard	Shi Tingmao; China	Wang Han; China	Kim Na-mi; South Korea
3 m springboard	He Zi; China	Wang Han; China	Cheong Jun Hoong; Malaysia
10 m platform	Si Yajie; China	Huang Xiaohui; China	Kim Un-hyang; North Korea
Synchronized 3 m springboard	China; Shi Tingmao; Wu Minxia	Malaysia; Cheong Jun Hoong; Ng Yan Yee	North Korea; Choe Un-gyong; Kim Jin-ok
Synchronized 10 m platform	China; Chen Ruolin; Liu Huixia	North Korea; Kim Un-hyang; Song Nam-hyang	Malaysia; Leong Mun Yee; Pandelela Rinong

== Medal table ==
Rank	Nation	Gold	Silver	Bronze	Total
1	China (CHN)	10	6	0	16
2	Malaysia (MAS)	0	2	3	5
3	South Korea (KOR)	0	1	4	5
4	North Korea (PRK)	0	1	2	3
5	Japan (JPN)	0	0	1	1
Totals (5 entries)		10	10	10	30

== Participating nations ==
A total of 61 athletes from 10 nations competed in diving at the 2014 Asian Games:

- China (16)
- Hong Kong (3)
- Japan (7)
- Kuwait (2)
- Macau (4)
- Malaysia (9)
- North Korea (6)
- Qatar (3)
- Singapore (3)
- South Korea (8)
