= Diving at the 2018 Asian Games =

- Venue: Gelora Bung Karno Aquatic Stadium
- Dates: 28 August – 1 September 2018
- Competitors: 80 from 14 nations

Diving at the 2018 Asian Games was held at the Gelora Bung Karno Aquatic Stadium, Jakarta, Indonesia from 28 August to 1 September 2018.

China dominated the competition by winning all the ten gold medals available.

== Schedule ==
P	Preliminary	F	Final

Event↓/Date →	28th Tue	29th Wed	30th Thu		31st Fri		1st Sat	
Men's 1 m springboard			P	F				
Men's 3 m springboard					P	F		
Men's 10 m platform							P	F
Men's synchronized 3 m springboard	F							
Men's synchronized 10 m platform		F						
Women's 1 m springboard					P	F		
Women's 3 m springboard							P	F
Women's 10 m platform			P	F				
Women's synchronized 3 m springboard		F						
Women's synchronized 10 m platform	F							

== Medalists ==
=== Men ===
Event	Gold	Silver	Bronze
1 m springboard	Peng Jianfeng; China	Liu Chengming; China	Woo Ha-ram; South Korea
3 m springboard	Xie Siyi; China	Cao Yuan; China	Chew Yiwei; Malaysia
10 m platform	Yang Jian; China	Qiu Bo; China	Woo Ha-ram; South Korea
Synchronized 3 m springboard	China; Cao Yuan; Xie Siyi	South Korea; Kim Yeong-nam; Woo Ha-ram	Japan; Sho Sakai; Ken Terauchi
Synchronized 10 m platform	China; Chen Aisen; Yang Hao	South Korea; Kim Yeong-nam; Woo Ha-ram	North Korea; Hyon Il-myong; Rim Kum-song

=== Women ===
Event	Gold	Silver	Bronze
1 m springboard	Wang Han; China	Chen Yiwen; China	Kim Su-ji; South Korea
3 m springboard	Shi Tingmao; China	Wang Han; China	Nur Dhabitah Sabri; Malaysia
10 m platform	Si Yajie; China	Zhang Jiaqi; China	Kim Mi-rae; North Korea
Synchronized 3 m springboard	China; Chang Yani; Shi Tingmao	Malaysia; Ng Yan Yee; Nur Dhabitah Sabri	North Korea; Kim Kwang-hui; Kim Mi-hwa
Synchronized 10 m platform	China; Zhang Jiaqi; Zhang Minjie	North Korea; Kim Kuk-hyang; Kim Mi-rae	Malaysia; Leong Mun Yee; Nur Dhabitah Sabri

== Medal table ==
Rank	Nation	Gold	Silver	Bronze	Total
1	China (CHN)	10	6	0	16
2	South Korea (KOR)	0	2	3	5
3	Malaysia (MAS)	0	1	3	4
3	North Korea (PRK)	0	1	3	4
5	Japan (JPN)	0	0	1	1
Totals (5 entries)		10	10	10	30

== Participating nations ==
A total of 80 athletes from 14 nations competed in diving at the 2018 Asian Games:

- China (15)
- Hong Kong (4)
- India (2)
- Indonesia (9)
- Iran (2)
- Japan (7)
- Macau (5)
- Malaysia (10)
- North Korea (6)
- Qatar (1)
- Singapore (8)
- South Korea (6)
- Thailand (4)
- Uzbekistan (1)
