= Singapore at the 2019 SEA Games =

Singapore at the 2019 Southeast Asian Games
- IOC code: SGP
- NOC: Singapore National Olympic Council
- Website: www.singaporeolympics.com

in the Philippines
- Competitors: 666 in 48 sports
- Flag bearer: Samuel Kang (Squash)
- Medals Ranked 6th: Gold 53 Silver 46 Bronze 68 Total 167

Southeast Asian Games appearances (overview)
- 1959; 1961; 1965; 1967; 1969; 1971; 1973; 1975; 1977; 1979; 1981; 1983; 1985; 1987; 1989; 1991; 1993; 1995; 1997; 1999; 2001; 2003; 2005; 2007; 2009; 2011; 2013; 2015; 2017; 2019; 2021; 2023; 2025; 2027; 2029

Singapore participated at the 2019 Southeast Asian Games in the Philippines from 30 November to 11 December 2019. The Games were held in multiple cities across Philippines in four main areas or hubs namely Manila, Clark and Subic.

== Competitors ==
Singapore participated in 48 sports with 666 athletes, the biggest contingent sent to an away Games.

| Sport | Men | Women | Total |
|---|---|---|---|
| Archery | 4 | 3 | 7 |
| Athletics | 13 | 13 | 26 |
| Badminton | 6 | 6 | 12 |
| Baseball | 21 | 0 | 21 |
| Basketball | 12 | 0 | 12 |
| Beach Volleyball | 4 | 4 | 8 |
| Billiard Sports | 7 | 2 | 9 |
| Bowling | 4 | 4 | 8 |
| Boxing | 2 | 2 | 4 |
| Canoeing | 4 | 1 | 5 |
| Chess | 0 | 1 | 1 |
| Cycling | 5 | 3 | 8 |
| Dancesport | 4 | 3 | 7 |
| Diving | 3 | 2 | 5 |
| Duathlon | 4 | 4 | 8 |
| Esports | 25 | 0 | 25 |
| Fencing | 12 | 12 | 24 |
| Floorball | 20 | 20 | 40 |
| Football | 20 | 0 | 20 |
| Golf | 4 | 3 | 7 |
| Gymnastics–Artistic | 5 | 3 | 8 |
| Gymnastics–Rhythmic | 0 | 5 | 5 |
| Beach Handball | 10 | 0 | 10 |
| Hockey-Indoor | 12 | 12 | 24 |
| Ice Hockey | 20 | 0 | 20 |
| Ice Skating | 5 | 4 | 9 |
| Jujitsu | 6 | 3 | 9 |
| Judo | 3 | 2 | 5 |
| Kurash | 2 | 0 | 2 |
| Lawn Bowls | 6 | 7 | 13 |
| Modern pentathlon | 1 | 1 | 2 |
| Muaythai | 1 | 1 | 2 |
| Netball | 0 | 12 | 12 |
| Open Water Swimming | 2 | 0 | 2 |
| Pencak Silat | 8 | 3 | 11 |
| Rugby Sevens | 12 | 12 | 24 |
| Sailing | 7 | 3 | 10 |
| Sambo | 6 | 2 | 8 |
| Sepak Takraw | 6 | 0 | 6 |
| Shooting | 5 | 4 | 9 |
| Skateboarding | 4 | 2 | 6 |
| Softball | 16 | 16 | 32 |
| Squash | 5 | 4 | 9 |
| Surfing | 4 | 2 | 6 |
| Swimming | 12 | 9 | 21 |
| Table Tennis | 4 | 4 | 8 |
| Taekwondo | 4 | 3 | 7 |
| Tennis | 2 | 2 | 4 |
| Traditional boat race | 13 | 13 | 26 |
| Triathlon | 4 | 4 | 8 |
| Underwater hockey | 12 | 12 | 24 |
| Volleyball | 15 | 0 | 15 |
| Wakeboard and Waterski | 4 | 2 | 6 |
| Water Polo | 13 | 13 | 26 |
| Windsurfing | 1 | 1 | 2 |
| Wrestling | 5 | 3 | 8 |
| Wushu | 3 | 2 | 5 |
| Total | 412 | 254 | 666 |

== Medal summary ==
=== Medal by sport ===
Medals by sport
| Sport | 1st place, gold medalist(s) | 2nd place, silver medalist(s) | 3rd place, bronze medalist(s) | Total |
|---|---|---|---|---|
| Archery | 0 | 0 | 0 | 0 |
| Athletics | 0 | 0 | 3 | 3 |
| Badminton | 0 | 1 | 2 | 3 |
| Basketball | 0 | 0 | 0 | 0 |
| Beach Handball | 0 | 0 | 0 | 0 |
| Billiards and snooker | 1 | 1 | 6 | 8 |
| Bowling | 3 | 1 | 4 | 8 |
| Boxing | 0 | 0 | 1 | 1 |
| Chess | 1 | 0 | 0 | 1 |
| Cycling | 0 | 1 | 2 | 3 |
| Dancesport | 0 | 1 | 4 | 5 |
| Diving | 0 | 1 | 2 | 3 |
| Duathlon | 0 | 1 | 0 | 1 |
| Esports | 0 | 1 | 1 | 2 |
| Figure skating | 1 | 0 | 0 | 1 |
| Fencing | 4 | 3 | 6 | 13 |
| Floorball | 1 | 1 | 0 | 2 |
| Football | 0 | 0 | 0 | 0 |
| Golf | 1 | 1 | 0 | 2 |
| Gymnastics | 0 | 0 | 1 | 1 |
| Ice hockey | 0 | 1 | 0 | 1 |
| Indoor hockey | 0 | 0 | 2 | 2 |
| Judo | 0 | 1 | 2 | 3 |
| Ju-jitsu | 2 | 1 | 4 | 7 |
| Karate | 0 | 0 | 0 | 0 |
| Kickboxing | 0 | 0 | 0 | 0 |
| Kurash | 0 | 1 | 0 | 1 |
| Lawn Bowls | 1 | 0 | 1 | 2 |
| Muaythai | 0 | 0 | 1 | 1 |
| Modern pentathlon | 0 | 0 | 2 | 2 |
| Netball | 0 | 1 | 0 | 1 |
| Pencak Silat | 2 | 1 | 2 | 5 |
| Rowing | 0 | 0 | 0 | 0 |
| Rugby sevens | 0 | 0 | 0 | 0 |
| Sailing | 1 | 5 | 0 | 6 |
| Sambo | 1 | 2 | 3 | 6 |
| Sepak Takraw | 0 | 0 | 0 | 0 |
| Shooting | 0 | 1 | 4 | 5 |
| Short track speed skating | 3 | 0 | 1 | 4 |
| Skateboarding | 0 | 0 | 0 | 0 |
| Soft tennis | 0 | 0 | 0 | 0 |
| Softball | 1 | 0 | 0 | 1 |
| Squash | 0 | 2 | 3 | 5 |
| Surfing | 0 | 0 | 0 | 0 |
| Swimming | 23 | 10 | 4 | 37 |
| Table tennis | 2 | 3 | 2 | 7 |
| Taekwondo | 0 | 1 | 0 | 1 |
| Tennis | 0 | 0 | 0 | 0 |
| Triathlon | 0 | 1 | 0 | 1 |
| Underwater hockey | 4 | 0 | 0 | 4 |
| Volleyball | 0 | 0 | 0 | 0 |
| Waterskiing | 0 | 0 | 1 | 1 |
| Water polo | 0 | 1 | 1 | 2 |
| Weightlifting | 0 | 0 | 0 | 0 |
| Wrestling | 0 | 0 | 3 | 3 |
| Wushu | 1 | 1 | 0 | 2 |
| Total | 53 | 46 | 68 | 167 |

=== Medal by date ===
Medals by date
| Day | Date | 1st place, gold medalist(s) | 2nd place, silver medalist(s) | 3rd place, bronze medalist(s) | Total |
|---|---|---|---|---|---|
| 1 | 1 December | 3 | 3 | 5 | 11 |
| 2 | 2 December | 1 | 4 | 2 | 7 |
| 3 | 3 December | 4 | 3 | 8 | 15 |
| 4 | 4 December | 10 | 2 | 5 | 17 |
| 5 | 5 December | 8 | 7 | 8 | 23 |
| 6 | 6 December | 6 | 3 | 8 | 17 |
| 7 | 7 December | 5 | 8 | 5 | 18 |
| 8 | 8 December | 6 | 4 | 8 | 18 |
| 9 | 9 December | 7 | 8 | 7 | 22 |
| 10 | 10 December | 3 | 3 | 10 | 16 |
| 11 | 11 December | 0 | 0 | 0 | 0 |
| Total | | 53 | 46 | 68 | 167 |

=== Medalists ===
| No. | Medal | Name | Sport | Event | Date |
|---|---|---|---|---|---|
| 1 | Gold | Yong Yi Xiang | Wushu | Changquan | 1 December |
| 2 | Gold | Amanda Yeap; Debbie Poh; Fariza Begum; Felicia Lim; Jerelee Ong; Jessica Chua; Jowie Tan; Lina Chu; Michelle Lok; Mindy Lim; Natalia Wee; Nordiana Mohd Yeari; Ong Hui Hui; Ong Swee Ling; Pearlynn Lim; Siti Nurhaliza Khairul Anuar; Tan Hui Zhi; Tiffany Ong; Yee Yun Shawn; Yeo Xuan | Floorball | Women's tournament | 1 December |
| 3 | Gold | Chloe Ing | Figure skating | Women's singles | 1 December |
| 4 | Gold | Hamillatu Arash Juffrie; Nujaid Hasif Zainal Abidin; Muhammad Nazrul Mohd Kamal | Pencak silat | seni Tunggal - Men's team | 2 December |
| 5 | Gold | Gong Qianyun | Chess | Women's rapid | 3 December |
| 6 | Gold | New Hui Fen | Bowling | Women's singles | 3 December |
| 7 | Gold | Amita Berthier | Fencing | Women's individual foil | 3 December |
| 8 | Gold | Cheyenne Goh | Short track speed skating | Women's 500 m | 3 December |
| 9 | Gold | Goh Quee Kee; Lim Poh Eng; Shermeen Lim Xin Yi | Lawn bowls | Women's triples | 4 December |
| 10 | Gold | Jonathan Chan; Marcus Chua; Kok Kiat Han; Kerby Kwan; Vincent Law; Simon Lee; Lim Wee Lit; Rudy Kurniawan Lin; Liu Dongliang; Lucas Ong; Twang Jia Ye; Samuel Wong | Underwater hockey | Men's 4x4 tournament | 4 December |
| 11 | Gold | Priscilla Ang; Cheoh Pin; Alice Chong; Chua Yi Ying; Lee Chi Kuen; Roeswita Leono Liaw; Lim Pei Ching; Celine Lim; Ena Ng; Beverley Ong; Sheena Soh; Christina Tham | Underwater hockey | Women's 4x4 tournament | 4 December |
| 12 | Gold | Cheyenne Goh | Short track speed skating | Women's 1000 m | 4 December |
| 13 | Gold | Lucas Ng; Sian Koh; Trevor Tan; Xu Jingfeng | Short track speed skating | Men's 3000 m relay | 4 December |
| 14 | Gold | Kiria Tikanah Abdul Rahman | Fencing | Women's individual épée | 4 December |
| 15 | Gold | Quah Jing Wen | Swimming | Women's 200 m butterfly | 4 December |
| 16 | Gold | Quah Zheng Wen | Swimming | Men's 100 m backstroke | 4 December |
| 17 | Gold | Quah Ting Wen | Swimming | Women's 100 m freestyle | 4 December |
| 18 | Gold | Darren Chua; Jonathan Tan; Joseph Schooling; Quah Zheng Wen | Swimming | Men's 4 × 200 m freestyle relay | 4 December |
| 19 | Gold | Muhammad Hazim Yusli | Pencak silat | Men's tanding class B | 5 December |
| 20 | Gold | Jonathan Chan; Marcus Chua; Kok Kiat Han; Kerby Kwan; Vincent Law; Simon Lee; Lim Wee Lit; Rudy Kurniawan Lin; Liu Dongliang; Lucas Ong; Twang Jia Ye; Samuel Wong | Underwater hockey | Men's 6x6 tournament | 5 December |
| 21 | Gold | Priscilla Ang; Cheoh Pin; Alice Chong; Chua Yi Ying; Lee Chi Kuen; Roeswita Leono Liaw; Lim Pei Ching; Celine Lim; Ena Ng; Beverley Ong; Sheena Soh; Christina Tham | Underwater hockey | Women's 6x6 tournament | 5 December |
| 22 | Gold | Elena Lee | Swimming | Women's 50 m backstroke | 5 December |
| 23 | Gold | Teong Tzen Wei | Swimming | Men's 50 m butterfly | 5 December |
| 24 | Gold | Christie Chue | Swimming | Women's 200 m breaststroke | 5 December |
| 25 | Gold | Muhammad Nazri Sutari | Sambo | Men's combat 82 kg | 5 December |
| 26 | Gold | Gan Ching Hwee; Quah Ting Wen; Quah Jing Wen; Christie Chue | Swimming | Women's 4 × 200 m freestyle relay | 5 December |
| 27 | Gold | Amita Berthier; Denyse Chan; Maxine Wong; Tatiana Wong | Fencing | Women's team foil | 6 December |
| 28 | Gold | James Leow | Golf | Men's individual | 6 December |
| 29 | Gold | Joseph Schooling | Swimming | Men's 100 m butterfly | 6 December |
| 30 | Gold | Daphne Tan; New Hui Fen; Shayna Ng; Cherie Tan | Bowling | Women's team of 4 | 6 December |
| 31 | Gold | Quah Zheng Wen | Swimming | Men's 200 m backstroke | 6 December |
| 32 | Gold | Darren Chua; Jonathan Tan; Joseph Schooling; Quah Zheng Wen | Swimming | Men's 4 × 100 m freestyle relay | 6 December |
| 33 | Gold | Kevin Jerrold Chan; Joshua Ian Lim; Darren Tan; Jet Ng | Fencing | Men's team foil | 7 December |
| 34 | Gold | Darren Chua | Swimming | Men's 200 m freestyle | 7 December |
| 35 | Gold | Quah Ting Wen | Swimming | Women's 50 m butterfly | 7 December |
| 36 | Gold | Quah Ting Wen; Quah Jing Wen; Cherlyn Yeoh Chzin Lin; Amanda Lim Xiang Qi | Swimming | Women's 4 × 100 m freestyle relay | 7 December |
| 37 | Gold | Ryan Lo | Sailing | Men's laser standard | 7 December |
| 38 | Gold | Aloysius Ong; Ziglar Oh; Ivan Ng; Schuyler Seah; Foo Say Kian; Andre Chia; Andrew Tan; Seow Chin Keong; Watson Tan; Malcolm Rhys Lim; Dominic Han; Muhammad Farhan Harahap Bin Amirudin; Joshua Tam; Marcus Chew; Raynard Heng | Softball | Men's tournament | 8 December |
| 39 | Gold | New Hui Fen | Bowling | Women's masters | 8 December |
| 40 | Gold | Lionel Khoo | Swimming | Men's 50 m breaststroke | 8 December |
| 41 | Gold | Amanda Lim Xiang Qi | Swimming | Women's 50 m freestyle | 8 December |
| 42 | Gold | Darren Chua | Swimming | Men's 100 m freestyle | 8 December |
| 43 | Gold | Elena Lee; Christie Chue; Quah Jing Wen; Quah Ting Wen | Swimming | Women's 4 × 100 m medley relay | 8 December |
| 44 | Gold | Peter Gilchrist | Billiards | Men's English billiards singles | 9 December |
| 45 | Gold | Noah Lim | Ju-jitsu | Men's U 62 kg | 9 December |
| 46 | Gold | Gan Ching Hwee | Swimming | Women's 800 m freestyle | 9 December |
| 47 | Gold | Quah Zheng Wen | Swimming | Men's 200 m butterfly | 9 December |
| 48 | Gold | Jonathan Tan | Swimming | Men's 50 m freestyle | 9 December |
| 49 | Gold | Quah Ting Wen | Swimming | Women's 100 m butterfly | 9 December |
| 50 | Gold | Quah Zheng Wen; Lionel Khoo; Joseph Schooling; Darren Chua | Swimming | Men's 4 × 100 m medley relay | 9 December |
| 51 | Gold | Lin Ye | Table tennis | Women's singles | 10 December |
| 52 | Gold | Pang Yew En Koen | Table tennis | Men's singles | 10 December |
| 53 | Gold | Constance Lien | Ju-jitsu | Women's U 62 kg | 10 December |
| 1 | Silver | Abielle Yeo Zhi Min; Angeline Teo Yi Ling; Chow Yan Teng; Gina Koh Ting Yi; Koh Ting Ting; Koh Xiao Li; Melissa Chan Pei Tung; Michelle Tan Ting Yee; Mounisha Devi Manivannan; Nadyn Kei Thinagaran; Ong Cheng Jing; Ong Xuan Rong; Pek Meng Yee | Water polo | Women's tournament | 1 December |
| 2 | Silver | Jerome Teo; Rachel Teo | Dancesport | Slow Foxtrot | 1 December |
| 3 | Silver | Akmal Shaharudin; Chan Li Yang; Farhan Yusoff; Gary Wong; Glendon Phua; Haleef Hairon; Jenmark Sorreda; Jeremy Chia; Joshua Seow; Lee Chee Yong; Lim Jian Hong; M Devanand; Ng Juin Jie; R Suria; Sean Huang; Syazni Ramlee; Thaddeus Tan; Tng Zong Wei; Yeo Kaixiang; Yeung Chun Yin | Floorball | Men's tournament | 1 December |
| 4 | Silver | Joel Tseng | Kurash | Men's - 73kg | 2 December |
| 5 | Silver | Muhammad Iqbal Abdul Rahman | Pencak silat | seni Tunggal - Men's singles | 2 December |
| 6 | Silver | Luke Chua Li Rong; Herlene Natasha Yu Zhihui; Bryce Chong Sheng Cher; Emma Ada Middleditch | Triathlon | Mixed relay | 2 December |
| 7 | Silver | Angelina Lim Xue Ning; Charmaine Soh Shi Hui; Carmen Goh; Jamie Lim Jia Yin; Kai Wei Toh; Melody Teo; Nur Aqilah Andin; Pei Shan Lee; Shuyi Kwok; Sindhu Nair; Vanessa Marie Lee; Xinyi Tan | Netball | Women's team | 2 December |
| 8 | Silver | Jowen Lim Si Wei | Wushu | Daoshu / Gunshu | 3 December |
| 9 | Silver | Ho Xiu Yi | Shooting | Women's 10 m air rifle | 3 December |
| 10 | Silver | Maxine Wong | Fencing | Women's individual foil | 3 December |
| 11 | Silver | New Hui Fen; Shayna Ng | Bowling | Women's doubles | 4 December |
| 12 | Silver | Cherlyn Yeoh | Swimming | Women's 100 m freestyle | 4 December |
| 13 | Silver | Luo Yiwei | Cycling | Women's time trial | 5 December |
| 14 | Silver | Emma Ada Middleditch; Ahmad Arif Ibrahim; Herlene Natasha Yu; Nicholas Rachmadi | Duathlon | Mixed relay | 5 December |
| 15 | Silver | Ashvin Jaswant Singh | Sambo | Men's combat 74kg | 5 December |
| 16 | Silver | Joseph Schooling | Swimming | Men's 50 m butterfly | 5 December |
| 17 | Silver | Toh Lian Han; Aloysius Yapp | Billiards | Men's 9-ball pool doubles | 5 December |
| 18 | Silver | Darren Chua | Swimming | Men's 200 m individual medley | 5 December |
| 19 | Silver | Gary Chow | Sambo | Men's sport 82 kg | 5 December |
| 20 | Silver | Low Yilong | Judo | Men's 100 kg | 6 December |
| 21 | Silver | Quah Zheng Wen | Swimming | Men's 100 m butterfly | 6 December |
| 22 | Silver | Aaron-Jon Liang; Au Yeong Wai Yhann; Samuel Kang; Sneha Sivakumar; Timothy Leong | Squash | Mixed team | 6 December |
| 23 | Silver | Josh Chua Shao Han; Pang Yew En Koen | Table tennis | Men's doubles | 7 December |
| 24 | Silver | Fong Kay Yian; Ashlee Tan Yi Xuan | Diving | Women's synchronized 3 metre springboard | 7 December |
| 25 | Silver | Kiria Tikanah Abdul Rahman; Cheryl Lim; Victoria Lim; Rebecca Ong | Fencing | Women's team épée | 7 December |
| 26 | Silver | Gan Ching Hwee | Swimming | Women's 400 m freestyle | 7 December |
| 27 | Silver | Quah Zheng Wen | Swimming | Men's 50 m backstroke | 7 December |
| 28 | Silver | Radiance Koh | Sailing | Women's optimist (under 16) | 7 December |
| 29 | Silver | Victoria Chan | Sailing | Women's laser radial | 7 December |
| 30 | Silver | Kenan Tan | Sailing | Men's optimist (under 16) | 7 December |
| 31 | Silver | James Leow; Hiroshi Hirahara Tai; Nicklaus Chiam | Golf | Men's team | 8 December |
| 32 | Silver | Tan Weixuan; Samson Lee; Simon Lee; Jefferson Cheong | Fencing | Men's team épée | 8 December |
| 33 | Silver | Joseph Schooling | Swimming | Men's 100 m freestyle | 8 December |
| 34 | Silver | Ethan Redden; Ryan Tan; Christian William Redden; Joewe Lam; Chen Pei Huan; Liu Zhiyang; Christopher Kelly Wong; Richard Lowell O'Brien; Chew Wee; Ignatius Ng; Kenny Liang; Cael Chua; Benjamin Huang; Ryan Goh; Eugene Ang | Ice hockey | Men's tournament | 8 December |
| 35 | Silver | Benjamin Chia | Ju-jitsu | Men's U 85 kg | 9 December |
| 36 | Silver | Colin Ng; Xu Yuanzhen; Roy Tay; Anthony Kiong; Stanley Chan; Daniella Ng | Sailing | Keelboat match racing in FE28R | 9 December |
| 37 | Silver | Loh Kean Yew | Badminton | Men's singles | 9 December |
| 38 | Silver | Christie Chue | Swimming | Women's 100 m breaststroke | 9 December |
| 39 | Silver | Teong Tzen Wei | Swimming | Men's 50 m freestyle | 9 December |
| 40 | Silver | Quah Jing Wen | Swimming | Women's 100 m butterfly | 9 December |
| 41 | Silver | Ng Ming Wei | Taekwondo | Men's kyorugi flyweight 58 kg | 9 December |
| 42 | Silver | Au Yeong Wai Yhann; Sneha Sivakumar; Sherilyn Yang; Yukino Tan | Squash | Women's team | 9 December |
| 43 | Silver | Colin Ng; Xu Yuanzhen; Roy Tay; Anthony Kiong; Stanley Chan; Daniella Ng | Sailing | Keelboat fleet racing in FE28R | 9 December |
| 44 | Silver | Thomas Maria Kopankiewicz | Esports | StarCraft II | 10 December |
| 45 | Silver | Feng Tianwei | Table tennis | Women's singles | 10 December |
| 46 | Silver | Clarence Chew | Table tennis | Men's singles | 10 December |
| 1 | Bronze | Ang An Jun; Chiam Kunyang; Chow Jing Lun; Darren Lee Jit-An; Goh Wen Zhe; Jayden See Tein Ee; Koh Jian Ying; Lee Chang-Kang; Lee Kai Yang; Nathanael Wayne Chong; Ooi Yee Jia; Tang Yee Heng; Yu Junjie | Water polo | Men's tournament | 1 December |
| 2 | Bronze | Jerome Teo; Rachel Teo | Dancesport | Viennese Waltz | 1 December |
| 3 | Bronze | Jerome Teo; Rachel Teo | Dancesport | Waltz | 1 December |
| 4 | Bronze | Gary Tsan; Shannen Tan | Dancesport | Paso Doble | 1 December |
| 5 | Bronze | Jeremy Sim | Dancesport | Men's breakdance | 1 December |
| 6 | Bronze | Mohamad Irwan Abdul Rahman | Shooting | Men's 10 m air rifle | 2 December |
| 7 | Bronze | Leong Khim Hoong; Melvin Tan Kwang Yong; Matthew Ngui Ming Fook | Lawn bowls | Men's triples | 2 December |
| 8 | Bronze | Adele Tan | Shooting | Women's 10 m air rifle | 3 December |
| 9 | Bronze | Shayna Ng | Bowling | Women's singles | 3 December |
| 10 | Bronze | Crystal Wong Jia Ying; Grace Chua Hui Zhen; Jaslyn Hooi Yue Yann; Jin Yujia; Nur Insyirah Khan; Shinta Mulia Sari; Sito Jia Rong; Tan Wei Han; Yeo Jia Min | Badminton | Women's team | 3 December |
| 11 | Bronze | Clive Leu | Fencing | Men's individual sabre | 3 December |
| 12 | Bronze | Cheah Ray Han | Bowling | Men's singles | 3 December |
| 13 | Bronze | Cheyenne Goh; Soo Kar Weng; Chua Suvian; Victoria Chin | Short track speed skating | Women's 3000 m relay | 3 December |
| 14 | Bronze | Au Yeong Wai Yhann | Squash | Women's singles | 3 December |
| 15 | Bronze | Chua Man Chin | Squash | Men's singles | 3 December |
| 16 | Bronze | Abel Tan Wen Xing; Andy Kwek Jun Liang; Danny Bawa Chrisnanta; Joel Koh Jia Wei; Loh Kean Hean; Loh Kean Yew; Muhammad Elaf Wei Tan; Jason Teh Jia Heng; Terry Hee Yong Kai; Toh Han Zhuo | Badminton | Men's team | 4 December |
| 17 | Bronze | Joshua Ian Lim | Fencing | Men's individual foil | 4 December |
| 18 | Bronze | Cheryl Lim | Fencing | Women's individual épée | 4 December |
| 19 | Bronze | Lionel Khoo | Swimming | Men's 100 m breaststroke | 4 December |
| 20 | Bronze | Sean Yeo Xong | Gymnastics | Men's horizontal bars | 4 December |
| 21 | Bronze | Nurul Suhaila | Pencak silat | Women's tanding class B | 5 December |
| 22 | Bronze | Shermaine Tung | Modern pentathlon | Women's beach laser | 5 December |
| 23 | Bronze | Marcus Ong | Modern pentathlon | Men's beach laser | 5 December |
| 24 | Bronze | Adele Tan; Emmanuel Chan | Shooting | Mixed 10 m air rifle team | 5 December |
| 25 | Bronze | Atiq Syazwani Roslan | Pencak silat | Women's tanding class A | 5 December |
| 26 | Bronze | Goh Choon Huat | Cycling | Men's time trial | 5 December |
| 27 | Bronze | Ann Lee | Fencing | Women's individual sabre | 5 December |
| 28 | Bronze | Ace Ang | Judo | Men's 73 kg | 5 December |
| 29 | Bronze | Timothy Lee Han Kuan; Mark Lee Han Ming | Diving | Men's synchronized 3 metre springboard | 6 December |
| 30 | Bronze | Aaron Ng | Judo | Men's 90 kg | 6 December |
| 31 | Bronze | Choy Yu Yong; Fong Zheng Jie; Clive Leu | Fencing | Men's team sabre | 6 December |
| 32 | Bronze | Tang Yong Siang | Sambo | Men's combat 57 kg | 6 December |
| 33 | Bronze | Cassiopeia Lim Wan Kee | Sambo | Women's sport 80 kg | 6 December |
| 34 | Bronze | Christie Chue | Swimming | Women's 50 m breaststroke | 6 December |
| 35 | Bronze | Kingsley Ang Tian Yi; Lim Chun Kiat | Billiards | Men's snooker doubles | 6 December |
| 36 | Bronze | Sarah Yong; Ryan Tay; Gary Chow; Timothy Loh | Sambo | Mixed Team | 6 December |
| 37 | Bronze | Mark Lee Han Ming | Diving | Men's 3 metre springboard | 7 December |
| 38 | Bronze | Feng Tianwei; Lin Ye | Table tennis | Women's doubles | 7 December |
| 39 | Bronze | Goi Rui Xuan; Wong Xin Ru | Table tennis | Women's doubles | 7 December |
| 40 | Bronze | Maximillian Ang Wei | Swimming | Men's 200 m breaststroke | 7 December |
| 41 | Bronze | Shanti Pereira | Athletics | Women's 200 m | 7 December |
| 42 | Bronze | Lena Tan | Muaythai | Women's 54 kg | 8 December |
| 43 | Bronze | Goh Choon Huat | Cycling | Men's road race | 8 December |
| 44 | Bronze | Muhammad Jaris Goh | Bowling | Men's masters | 8 December |
| 45 | Bronze | Shayna Ng | Bowling | Women's masters | 8 December |
| 46 | Bronze | Nur Alysha Mohamad Rizwan | Waterskiing | Women's wakeskate | 8 December |
| 47 | Bronze | Jessica Ong; Lee Kar Moon; Ann Lee; Jolie Lee | Fencing | Women's team sabre | 8 December |
| 48 | Bronze | Shanti Pereira | Athletics | Women's 100 m | 8 December |
| 49 | Bronze | Jessica Tan | Billiards | Women's snooker singles | 8 December |
| 50 | Bronze | Teo Shun Xie | Shooting | Women's 10 m air pistol | 9 December |
| 51 | Bronze | Chew Khai Kiat | Esports | Hearthstone | 9 December |
| 52 | Bronze | Paul Lim | Ju-jitsu | Men's U 69 kg | 9 December |
| 53 | Bronze | Teh May Yong | Ju-jitsu | Women's U 49 kg | 9 December |
| 54 | Bronze | Mohamed Hanurdeen Hamid | Boxing | Men's flyweight (52 kg) | 9 December |
| 55 | Bronze | Ong Jung Yi | Swimming | Men's 200 m butterfly | 9 December |
| 56 | Bronze | Nur Izlyn Binti Zaini | Athletics | Women's 100 m hurdles | 9 December |
| 57 | Bronze | Aloysius Yapp | Billiards | Men's 10-ball pool singles | 9 December |
| 58 | Bronze | Chua Man Tong; Chua Man Chin; Aaron-Jon Liang; Samuel Kang | Squash | Men's team | 9 December |
| 59 | Bronze | Madeline Wee | Wrestling | Women's freestyle 62 kg | 10 December |
| 60 | Bronze | Lou Hong Yeow | Wrestling | Men's freestyle 70 kg | 10 December |
| 61 | Bronze | Fiona Toh | Ju-jitsu | Women's U 55 kg | 10 December |
| 62 | Bronze | Kwan Yan Wei | Ju-jitsu | Men's U 77 kg | 10 December |
| 63 | Bronze | Yap Su Jun | Wrestling | Women's freestyle 55 kg | 10 December |
| 64 | Bronze | Aloysius Yapp | Billiards | Men's 9-ball pool singles | 10 December |
| 65 | Bronze | Toh Lian Han | Billiards | Men's 9-ball pool singles | 10 December |
| 66 | Bronze | Chen Jingyi; Hannah Tan Ismail; Rahimah Abdul Aziz; Nadia Binte Ibrahim; Joan Anne Lim Ooi Hong; Sinuan Wannelenah Bte Mohd Alvarez; Janna Lim Ju Hong; Suriati Sonny; Juliette Lim Chor Hong; O Ming Fen; Natasha Venise Gerard; Lam Xin Ni | Indoor hockey | Women's tournament | 10 December |
| 67 | Bronze | Jessica Tan; Suvene Ng | Billiards | Women's 9-ball pool doubles | 10 December |
| 68 | Bronze | Muhammad Shafiq Abdul Rashid; Muhammad Hidayat Mat Rahim; Guhan Mayazhagu; Abdul Rahim Abdul Rashid; Aik Yu Chen; Mohammed Sabri Yuhari; Grewal Ishwarpal Singh; Mohamed Rifqi Mohamed Rafik Alkhatib; Muhammad Zafir bin Mohamad Nasir; Tan Yi Ru; Timothy Goh Kai Yang; Karuppiah Arasu CT | Indoor hockey | Men's tournament | 10 December |
