= Diving at the 2013 SEA Games – Women's synchronized 3 metre springboard =

The women's synchronized 3 metre platform diving competition at the 2013 SEA Games took place in Naypyidaw, Myanmar on 20 December at the Wunna Theikdi Aquatics Centre.

== Schedule ==
All times are Myanmar Standard Time (UTC+06:30)

Date	Time	Event
Friday, 20 December 2013	17:00	Final

== Results ==
Legend

- DNF — Did not finish
- DNS — Did not start

Rank	Athlete	Dives					Total
Rank	Athlete	1	2	3	4	5	Total
1st place, gold medalist(s)	Malaysia (MAS); Ng Yan Yee; Cheong Jun Hoong	49.20	49.20	68.40	58.50	68.40	293.70
2nd place, silver medalist(s)	Indonesia (INA); Eka Purnama Indah; Dewi Setyaningsih	40.80	45.60	53.46	59.64	50.40	249.90
3rd place, bronze medalist(s)	Singapore (SIN); Fong Kay Yian; Lee Myra Jia Wen	42.00	42.60	48.96	42.93	47.04	223.53
4	Vietnam (VIE); Hoang Le Thanh Thuy; Nguyen Vu Thao Quynh	39.00	39.00	50.40	46.17	39.60	211.65
5	Thailand (THA); Surincha Booranapol; Jiratchaya Yothong Yos	30.00	39.00	43.47	41.76	27.60	181.83
