= Bowling at the 2019 SEA Games – Men's singles =

Bowling – Men's singles at the 2019 SEA Games
- Venue: Coronado Lanes, Starmall EDSA-Shaw
- Location: Mandaluyong, Philippines
- Date: 3 December 2019
- Competitors: 30 from 8 nations

Medalists
gold medal	Tan Chye Chern (MAS)
silver medal	Annop Arromsaranon (THA)
bronze medal	Cheah Ray Han (SGP)

The men's singles competition for bowling at the 2019 SEA Games in Philippines was held on 3 December 2019 at Coronado Lanes, Starmall EDSA-Shaw.

== Results ==
Detailed result as in below:

Rank	Athlete	Game						Total
Rank	Athlete	1	2	3	4	5	6	Total
1st place, gold medalist(s)	Tan Chye Chern (MAS)	225	248	277	180	215	189	1334
2nd place, silver medalist(s)	Annop Arromsaranon (THA)	227	244	234	215	223	188	1331
3rd place, bronze medalist(s)	Cheah Ray Han (SGP)	213	258	234	202	194	215	1316
4	Hardy Rachmadian (INA)	280	245	204	183	244	155	1311
5	Patrick Nuqui (PHI)	237	194	218	201	257	203	1310
6	Yannaphon Larpapharat (THA)	236	216	203	173	233	246	1307
7	Faiz Dzuhairy Dzafran (BRU)	211	177	201	256	244	217	1306
8	Kenneth Chua (PHI)	237	247	200	193	202	205	1284
9	Billy Muhmmad Islam (INA)	289	201	215	191	192	191	1279
10	Surasak Manuwong (THA)	187	205	233	235	226	190	1276
11	Muhd Jaris Goh (SGP)	234	237	185	244	156	211	1267
12	Alex Chong (SGP)	197	201	225	186	221	217	1247
13	Merwin Tan (PHI)	204	238	196	215	190	202	1245
14	Huyn Binh Quoc Su (VIE)	215	213	202	142	245	220	1237
15	Ryan Lalisang (INA)	223	204	222	208	170	193	1220
16	Tun Hakim (MAS)	230	200	192	203	207	184	1216
17	Atchariya Cheng (THA)	184	225	190	241	180	184	1204
18	Rafiq Ismail (MAS)	180	245	163	212	168	224	1192
19	Yeri Ramadona (INA)	212	206	216	193	198	166	1191
20	Basil Dill Ng (SGP)	192	189	170	193	247	194	1185
21	Ahmad Muaz (MAS)	204	203	204	178	193	202	1184
22	Muhammad Al-Amin (BRU)	189	186	226	257	162	157	1177
23	Ang Htay Win (MYA)	221	173	183	204	193	181	1155
24	Frederick Ong (PHI)	182	240	172	163	185	171	1113
25	Abu Khaledi Yussrri (BRU)	195	203	163	156	184	202	1103
26	Nguyen Pho Thanh (VIE)	193	189	197	159	167	191	1096
27	Pham Phu Gia (VIE)	179	148	172	246	154	180	1079
28	Tun Naing Lin (MYA)	145	182	183	158	189	172	1029
29	Awangku Haziqquddin Shah Wardi (BRU)	171	158	182	171	146	173	1001
30	Tran Tuan Anh (VIE)	137	178	147	201	146	159	968
