= Huang Ziliang =

Huang Ziliang may refer to:

- Derek Wong (Chinese: 黄梓良; pinyin: Huáng Zǐliáng, born 1989), Singaporean badminton player
- Ooi Tze Liang (Chinese: 黄兹梁; pinyin: Huáng Zīliáng, born 1993), Malaysian diver
