= Diving at the 2017 SEA Games =

- Venue: National Aquatic Centre
- Date: 27–30 August 2017

The diving competitions at the 2017 SEA Games in Kuala Lumpur took place at National Aquatic Centre in Bukit Jalil. It was one of four aquatic sports at the Games, along with swimming, water polo, and synchronised swimming.

The 2017 Games featured competitions in thirteen events (men 5 events, women 5 events and mixed 3 events).

== Events ==
The following events were contested:

- 1 m springboard
- 3 m springboard
- 10 m platform
- 3 m springboard synchronised
- 10 m platform synchronised
- 3 m mixed springboard synchronised
- 10 m mixed platform synchronised
- Team event

== Competition schedule ==
All times are Malaysia Standard Time (UTC+8)

Day	Time	Event
Sat, 26 August	12:00–13:00	Women's 3m Springboard
Sat, 26 August	13:45–14:45	Men's 3m Springboard
Sat, 26 August	15:30–16:15	Team Event
Sun, 27 August	17:00–18:00	Women's 1m Springboard
Sun, 27 August	18:30–19:30	Men's 10m Platform
Mon, 28 August	17:00–17:45	Women's 10m Platform
Mon, 28 August	18:15–19:15	Men's 1m Springboard
Mon, 28 August	19:45–20:30	Mixed Synchronised 3m Springboard
Tue, 29 August	17:00–17:45	Women's Synchronised 3m Springboard
Tue, 29 August	18:15–19:00	Men's Synchronised 3m Springboard
Tue, 29 August	19:30–20:15	Mixed Synchronised 10m Platform
Wed, 30 August	09:30–10:15	Women's Synchronised 10m Platform
Wed, 30 August	11:30–11:45	Men's Synchronised 10m Platform

== Participation ==
=== Participating nations ===
- Indonesia (11)
- Malaysia (16)
- Myanmar (1)
- Singapore (8)
- Thailand (5)
- Vietnam (5)

== Medal summary ==
=== Medal table ===
* Host nation (Malaysia)

Rank	Nation	Gold	Silver	Bronze	Total
1	Malaysia (MAS)*	12	4	1	17
2	Singapore (SGP)	1	6	5	12
3	Indonesia (INA)	0	1	3	4
4	Thailand (THA)	0	0	2	2
4	Vietnam (VIE)	0	0	2	2
Totals (5 entries)		13	11	13	37

=== Men ===
Event	Gold	Silver	Bronze
1 metre springboard	Ahmad Amsyar Azman; Malaysia	Ooi Tze Liang; Malaysia	Mark Lee Han Ming; Singapore
3 metre springboard	Ooi Tze Liang; Malaysia	Ahmad Amsyar Azman; Malaysia	Timothy Lee Han Kuan; Singapore
10 metre platform	Ooi Tze Liang; Malaysia	Chew Yiwei; Malaysia	Jonathan Chan; Singapore
Synchronised 3 metre springboard	Malaysia; Ahmad Amsyar Azman; Chew Yiwei	Singapore; Mark Lee Han Ming; Timothy Lee Han Kuan	Indonesia; Adityo Restu Putra; Tri Anggoro Priambodo
Synchronised 10 metre platform	Malaysia; Hanis Nazirul Jaya Surya; Jellson Jabillin	Indonesia; Adityo Restu Putra; Andriyan	Singapore; Jonathan Chan; Joshua James Chong

=== Women ===
Event	Gold	Silver	Bronze
1 metre springboard	Cheong Jun Hoong; Malaysia	Jasmine Lai Pui Yee; Malaysia	Ngô Phương Mai; Vietnam
3 metre springboard	Nur Dhabitah Sabri; Malaysia	None (Note: Malaysian diver, Ng Yan Yee failed a "Sample B" doping test. She was stripped of her two gold medals which was won at the women's 3 metre springboard and synchronised 3 metre springboard events. The original silver medalists were awarded the gold medals while there is no mention about the status of the original bronze medalists. Ng paired with Nur Dhabitah Sabri in the synchronised 3 metre springboard.)	Ashlee Tan Yi Xuan; Singapore
10 metre platform	Pandelela Rinong Pamg; Malaysia	Freida Lim; Singapore	Kimberly Bong Qian Ping; Malaysia
Synchronised 3 metre springboard	Singapore; Ashlee Tan Yi Xuan; Fong Kay Yian	None	Indonesia; Eka Purnama Indah; Linadini Yasmin
Synchronised 10 metre platform	Malaysia; Leong Mun Yee; Traisy Vivien Tukiet	Singapore; Freida Lim; Myra Lee	Thailand; Surincha Booranapol; Titiporn Tonapho

=== Mixed ===
Event	Gold	Silver	Bronze
Synchronised 3 metre springboard	Malaysia; Jasmine Lai Pui Yee; Muhammad Syafiq Puteh	Singapore; Ashlee Tan Yi Xuan; Joshua James Chong	Vietnam; Ngô Phương Mai; Vũ Anh Duy
Synchronised 10 metre platform	Malaysia; Leong Mun Yee; Jellson Jabillin	Singapore; Freida Lim; Jonathan Chan	Indonesia; Della Dinarsari Harimurti; Andriyan
Team	Malaysia; Pandelela Rinong Pamg; Gabriel Gilbert Daim	Singapore; Freida Lim; Jonathan Chan	Thailand; Surincha Booranapol; Theerapat Siriboon
