= Bowling at the 2019 SEA Games – Women's masters =

Bowling – Women's masters at the 2019 SEA Games
- Venue: Coronado Lanes, Starmall EDSA-Shaw
- Location: Mandaluyong, Philippines
- Date: 7–8 December 2019
- Nations: 8

Medalists
gold medal	New Hui Fen (SGP)
silver medal	Siti Safiyah (MAS)
bronze medal	Shayna Ng (SGP)

The women's masters competition for bowling at the 2019 SEA Games in Philippines was held on 7 and 8 December 2019 at Coronado Lanes, Starmall EDSA-Shaw.

== Schedule ==
All times are Philippine Standard Time (UTC+8).

Date	Time	Squad
Sat, 7 December 2019	09:00	1st block
Sun, 8 December 2019	09:00	2nd block
Sun, 8 December 2019	13:30	Stepladder finals

== Results ==
=== Preliminary ===
Detailed result as in below:

Rank	Athlete	Game																Total
Rank	Athlete	1	2	3	4	5	6	7	8	9	10	11	12	13	14	15	16	Total
1	New Hui Fen (SGP)	201; 10	188; 0	226; 10	171; 0	247; 10	186; 10	212; 10	205; 10	258; 10	227; 0	185; 0	233; 10	238; 10	224; 10	203; 10	203; 10	3527
2	Siti Safiyah (MAS)	188; 0	179; 0	218; 0	180; 0	171; 0	224; 0	201; 0	247; 10	202; 10	236; 10	237; 0	236; 10	208; 10	214; 10	236; 10	258; 10	3515
3	Shayna Ng (SGP)	215; 10	256; 10	187; 0	212; 10	280; 10	206; 0	258; 10	204; 0	194; 0	143; 0	200; 10	158; 0	225; 10	233; 10	248; 10	187; 0	3496
4	Cherie Tan (SGP)	161; 0	212; 10	234; 10	253; 10	236; 10	180; 10	225; 10	200; 10	193; 10	214; 10	216; 0	226; 10	186; 0	191; 10	255; 10	189; 0	3491
5	Shalin Zulkifli (MAS)	259; 10	215; 10	226; 10	192; 10	184; 0	180; 0	205; 0	200; 10	235; 10	176; 0	186; 0	276; 10	194; 0	173; 0	213; 10	211; 10	3415
6	Sin Li Jane (MAS)	187; 0	180; 0	184; 10	245; 10	200; 10	211; 10	220; 10	215; 10	237; 0	192; 10	226; 10	174; 0	205; 0	242; 10	182; 0	207; 10	3407
7	Aldila Indryati (INA)	247; 10	206; 0	201; 10	173; 0	200; 10	200; 10	223; 10	162; 0	192; 0	268; 10	224; 10	210; 10	222; 0	199; 0	187; 0	203; 0	3397
8	Lara Posadas-Wong (PHI)	202; 0	183; 0	203; 10	220; 10	193; 0	235; 10	159; 0	189; 0	236; 10	208; 0	207; 0	213; 0	227; 10	224; 10	210; 0	203; 10	3382
9	Esther Cheah (MAS)	231; 10	189; 10	194; 0	181; 10	185; 0	215; 10	223; 10	194; 0	158; 0	221; 0	167; 10	244; 10	236; 0	218; 10	236; 10	160; 0	3342
10	Daphne Tan (SGP)	207; 0	232; 10	163; 0	171; 0	217; 10	214; 0	219; 10	214; 10	183; 0	234; 10	195; 10	206; 10	214; 10	206; 0	182; 0	179; 0	3316
11	Alexis Sy (PHI)	173; 0	203; 0	188; 0	178; 10	201; 0	176; 0	190; 0	229; 10	205; 0	205; 0	199; 10	194; 0	198; 10	187; 0	232; 10	213; 10	3231
12	Bea Hernandez (PHI)	198; 10	157; 0	183; 10	203; 0	238; 0	170; 0	223; 0	207; 0	235; 10	184; 0	245; 10	158; 0	163; 0	165; 0	201; 0	233; 10	3213
13	Nadia Pramanik (INA)	194; 0	212; 10	157; 0	146; 0	235; 10	225; 10	234; 10	213; 10	176; 0	212; 10	205; 10	180; 0	168; 0	178; 0	202; 10	182; 10	3209
14	Sharon Limansantoso (INA)	226; 10	207; 10	223; 10	191; 0	233; 10	176; 0	161; 0	187; 0	191; 0	211; 10	180; 0	201; 0	201; 0	201; 10	159; 0	172; 0	3180
15	Tannya Roumimper (INA)	192; 0	200; 0	203; 0	216; 10	178; 0	188; 0	183; 0	190; 0	218; 10	185; 10	195; 0	221; 0	191; 10	202; 0	176; 0	191; 0	3169
16	Kantaporn Singhabubpha (THA)	214; 10	207; 10	166; 0	161; 0	210; 0	220; 10	176; 0	195; 0	223; 10	147; 0	166; 0	185; 10	227; 10	195; 0	223; 0	194; 0	3169

=== Stepladder finals ===
Stepladder final round 1			Stepladder final round 2
			1	New Hui Fen (SGP)	190	213
2	Siti Safiyah (MAS)	234	2	Siti Safiyah (MAS)	190	194
3	Shayna Ng (SGP)	201
