= Bowling at the 2019 SEA Games – Women's singles =

Bowling – Women's singles at the 2019 SEA Games
- Venue: Coronado Lanes, Starmall EDSA-Shaw
- Location: Mandaluyong, Philippines
- Date: 3 December 2019
- Competitors: 28 from 8 nations

Medalists
gold medal	New Hui Fen (SGP)
silver medal	Tannya Roumimper (INA)
bronze medal	Shayna Ng (SGP)

The women's singles competition for bowling at the 2019 SEA Games in Philippines was held on 3 December 2019 at Coronado Lanes, Starmall EDSA-Shaw.

== Results ==
Detailed result as in below:

Rank	Athlete	Game						Total
Rank	Athlete	1	2	3	4	5	6	Total
1st place, gold medalist(s)	New Hui Fen (SGP)	201	258	235	213	235	235	1372
2nd place, silver medalist(s)	Tannya Roumimper (INA)	202	255	233	218	176	223	1307
3rd place, bronze medalist(s)	Shayna Ng (SGP)	198	266	189	183	217	218	1271
4	Sin Li Jane (MAS)	237	179	205	183	244	202	1250
5	Daphne Tan (SGP)	215	223	191	199	171	248	1247
6	Esther Cheah (MAS)	210	193	199	237	186	204	1229
7	Shalin Zulkifli (MAS)	202	193	192	235	215	192	1229
8	Liza Del Rosario (PHI)	234	155	184	236	203	201	1213
9	Siti Safiyah Amirah (MAS)	218	194	214	225	151	205	1207
10	Kantaporn Singhabubpha (THA)	168	176	245	193	236	185	1203
11	Alexis Sy (PHI)	174	204	211	180	202	231	1202
12	Sharon Limansantoso (INA)	159	235	213	189	204	192	1192
13	Cherie Tan (SGP)	201	203	187	195	196	189	1172
14	Aldila Indryati (INA)	187	178	160	215	216	193	1149
15	Nadia Pramanik (INA)	222	195	161	178	191	186	1133
16	Pitchapa Reongsiri (THA)	197	224	163	181	183	178	1126
17	Bea Hernandez (PHI)	200	184	147	190	191	188	1100
18	Lara Posadas-Wong (PHI)	227	166	163	136	203	194	1089
19	Yanee Saebe (THA)	169	199	172	171	180	193	1084
20	May Hlay Yin (MYA)	174	182	180	201	181	143	1061
21	Fatin Adilah Haji Mahadi (BRU)	164	187	200	167	169	162	1049
22	Siti Hawa Natasya (BRU)	160	186	177	145	186	194	1048
23	Dayangku Nadia Nabila (BRU)	198	173	161	174	159	177	1042
24	Khattiya Ngoenkham (THA)	150	176	152	171	176	168	993
25	Fatin Nur Ashikin (BRU)	149	207	189	147	154	137	983
26	Nguyen Hien Thi (VIE)	157	184	179	108	136	163	927
27	San Myint Myint (MYA)	133	148	142	171	145	167	906
28	Nguyen Chi Thi Yen (VIE)	129	146	91	128	150	133	777
