= Diving at the 2018 Commonwealth Games – Women's 1 metre springboard =

Women's 1 metre springboard at the 2018 Commonwealth Games
- Venue: Gold Coast Aquatic Centre
- Date: 13 April
- Competitors: 14 from 7 nations
- Winning score: 275.30

Medalists
gold medal	Grace Reid	Scotland
silver medal	Georgia Sheehan	Australia
bronze medal	Esther Qin	Australia

The women's 1 metre springboard was part of the Diving at the 2018 Commonwealth Games program. The competition was held on 13 April 2018 at Gold Coast Aquatic Centre in Gold Coast.

== Format ==
The competition was held in two rounds:

- Preliminary round: All 14 divers perform five dives; the top 12 divers advance to the final.
- Final: The 12 divers perform five dives; the preliminary round scores are erased and the top three divers win the gold, silver and bronze medals accordingly.

== Schedule ==
All times are Australian Eastern Standard Time (UTC+10).

Date	Start	Round
13 April	10:07	Preliminary
13 April	19:07	Finals

== Results ==
Results:

Green denotes finalists

Rank	Diver	Preliminary		Final	
Rank	Diver	Points	Rank	Points	Rank
1st place, gold medalist(s)	Grace Reid (SCO)	259.25	6	275.30	1
2nd place, silver medalist(s)	Georgia Sheehan (AUS)	263.75	2	264.00	2
3rd place, bronze medalist(s)	Esther Qin (AUS)	273.80	1	252.95	3
4	Julia Vincent (RSA)	260.95	3	247.40	4
5	Katherine Torrance (ENG)	259.55	5	237.50	5
6	Nur Dhabitah Sabri (MAS)	258.60	7	235.80	6
7	Alicia Blagg (ENG)	259.90	4	228.55	7
8	Jasmine Lai (MAS)	249.20	8	223.20	8
9	Kimberly Bong (MAS)	213.95	12	220.25	9
10	Micaela Bouter (RSA)	230.75	11	217.25	10
11	Nicole Gillis (RSA)	231.90	10	210.95	11
12	Shaye Boddington (NZL)	237.95	9	194.50	12
13	Elizabeth Cui (NZL)	198.80	13	did not advance	
14	Yashoda de Silva (SRI)	117.90	14	did not advance	
