= Manila F.A.M.E. International =

Manila FAME is a bi-annual trade show organized by the Center for International Trade Expositions and Missions (CITEM), the export promotions arm of the Philippine Department of Trade and Industry (DTI).

Launched in 1983, it is the second-longest running trade event on houseware, furnishings, gift items, holiday decor, and fashion accessories in the Asia-Pacific Region. It is the only show in the Philippines recognized by the Union des Foires Internationales, the union of the world's leading tradeshow organizers, fairground owners, and major national and international associations of the exhibitions industry.

On October 17–19, 2024, a show was held at the World Trade Center Metro Manila in Pasay City. It featured over 400 products.

Manila FAME showcases Philippine products and settings that are in keeping with modern trends.

== Gallery ==
Houseware

Fashion

Holiday Decor

Home Furnishing

Interaction shot

Registration counter

Interaction shot

Networking night
