= Diving at the 2013 SEA Games =

Diving at the 2013 SEA Games took place in Naypyidaw, Myanmar between December 18–21. Eight competitions held in both, men and women's. All competition took place at the Wunna Theikdi Aquatics Centre.

== Results ==
=== Men ===
Event	Gold	Silver	Bronze
3 m springboard	Ooi Tze Liang; Malaysia	Mark Lee Han Ming; Singapore	Chew Yi Wei; Malaysia
10 m platform	Muhammad Nazreen Abdullah; Malaysia	Ooi Tze Liang; Malaysia	Adityo Restu Putra; Indonesia
Synchronized 3 m springboard	Malaysia; Ooi Tze Liang; Ahmad Amsyar Azman	Singapore; Timothy Lee Han Kuan; Mark Lee Han Ming	Indonesia; Akhmad Sukran Jamjami; Adityo Restu Putra
Synchronized 10 m platform	Malaysia; Ooi Tze Liang; Muhammad Nazreen Abdullah	Indonesia; Andriyan; Adityo Restu Putra	Singapore; Timothy Lee Han Kuan; Mark Lee Han Ming

=== Women ===
Event	Gold	Silver	Bronze
3 m springboard	Cheong Jun Hoong; Malaysia	Ng Yan Yee; Malaysia	Eka Purnama Indah; Indonesia
10 m platform	Pandelela Rinong Pamg; Malaysia	Loh Zhiayi; Malaysia	Hla Nandar; Myanmar
Synchronized 3 m springboard	Malaysia; Ng Yan Yee; Cheong Jun Hoong	Indonesia; Eka Purnama Indah; Dewi Setyaningsih	Singapore; Fong Kay Yian; Myra Lee Jia Wen
Synchronized 10 m platform	Malaysia; Nur Dhabitah Sabri; Leong Mun Yee	Myanmar; Nay Chi Su Su Latt; Saw Hla Nandar	Indonesia; Dewi Setyaningsih; Linadini Yasmin

== Medal table ==
* Host nation (Myanmar)

Rank	Nation	Gold	Silver	Bronze	Total
1	Malaysia	8	3	1	12
2	Indonesia	0	2	4	6
3	Singapore	0	2	2	4
4	Myanmar*	0	1	1	2
Totals (4 entries)		8	8	8	24
