= Jasmine Lai Pui Yee =

Malaysian diver (born 1995)

Jasmine Lai
Personal information
- Full name: Jasmine Lai Pui Yee
- Born: 13 December 1995 (age 30) Perak, Malaysia
- Education: University of Malaya

Chinese name
- Chinese: 黎蓓怡
- Hanyu Pinyin: Lí Bèiyí
- Yale Romanization: Làih Púih-yìh

Sport
- Country: Malaysia
- Events: 1 m, 3 m, 3 m synchro
Medal record
Representing Malaysia
Southeast Asian Games
| Gold medal – first place | 2017 Kuala Lumpur | 3 m mixed synchro springboard |
| Silver medal – second place | 2017 Kuala Lumpur | 1 m springboard |
| Silver medal – second place | 2019 Philippines | 3 m springboard |

Jasmine Lai Pui Yee (born 13 December 1995) is a Malaysian diver. She grew up in Perak, where she befriended future fellow Perak diving team member Kam Ling Kar. The pair took gold in the 3 metre springboard and 10 metre platform synchro events at the 2011 Asian Age Group Championships, while Lai won a gold medal in the 10 metre platform individual event. Lai and Kam and were initially scheduled to compete in diving at the Southeast Asian Games that same year, but in the end Lai did not participate. Lai won her first gold medal for Perak in the 1 metre springboard event at the 2012 Sukma Games. At the 2014 Sukma Games, she again partnered with Kam for the 3 metre springboard synchro event, where the pair won a gold medal; Lai subsequently edged out Kam to win a gold medal in the 1 metre springboard event as well. Lai and Kam also competed in diving at the 2015 Summer Universiade. In diving at the 2017 Southeast Asian Games, Lai won a silver in the 1 metre springboard event, and the gold medal in the mixed 3 metre springboard synchro with Muhammad Syafiq Puteh after fellow Malaysian Ng Yan Yee failed a doping test and was stripped of the gold medal in the latter event. Lai competed in the women's 1 metre springboard and 3 metre springboard events at the 2018 Commonwealth Games. At the 2019 Southeast Asian Games, she placed second in the 3 metre springboard event behind Ng, with a score of 241.95. She retired from the national team in February 2020 to focus on her studies for her final term of university.
