= Diving at the 2013 SEA Games – Men's synchronized 3 metre springboard =

The men's 3 synchronized metre platform diving competition at the 2013 SEA Games took place in Naypyidaw, Myanmar on 20 December at the Wunna Theikdi Aquatics Centre.

== Schedule ==
All times are Myanmar Standard Time (UTC+06:30)

Date	Time	Event
Friday, 20 December 2013	15:00	Final

== Results ==
Legend

- DNF — Did not finish
- DNS — Did not start

Rank	Team	Dives						Total
Rank	Team	1	2	3	4	5	6	Total
1st place, gold medalist(s)	Malaysia (MAS); Ooi Tze Liang; Ahmad Amsyar Azman	49.80	49.20	70.68	72.42	59.85	71.40	373.35
2nd place, silver medalist(s)	Singapore (SIN); Lee Timothy Han Kuan; Lee Mark Han Ming	46.80	46.80	65.70	60.45	54.90	63.00	336.45
3rd place, bronze medalist(s)	Indonesia (INA); Akhmad Sukran Jamjami; Adityo Restu Putra	45.00	45.60	66.96	52.20	59.16	65.70	334.62
4	Vietnam (VIE); Nguyen Minh Sang; Vu Anh Duy	46.20	41.40	48.36	59.40	61.20	52.20	308.76
5	Thailand (THA); Suchart Pichi; Theerapat Siri Boon	37.20	39.60	49.68	60.30	56.73	41.40	284.91
