= Diving at the 2019 SEA Games – Results =

Diving at the 2019 Southeast Asian Games
- Venue: New Clark City Aquatics Center, Capas
- Dates: 6–7 December
- Competitors: 24 from 6 nations

The diving competitions at the 2019 Southeast Asian Games in Philippines took place at New Clark City Aquatics Center in Carpas from 6 to 7 December 2019.

Malaysia has dominated all diving events.

== Schedule ==
F	Final

Event↓/Date →	6th Fri	7th Sat
Women's 3 m springboard	F	
Men's synchronised 3 m springboard	F	
Men's 3 m springboard		F
Women's synchronized 3 m springboard		F

== Results ==
The 2019 Games features competitions in four events.

=== Individual ===
==== Men's 3 metre springboard ====
Rank	Diver	Final						
Rank	Diver	Dive 1	Dive 2	Dive 3	Dive 4	Dive 5	Dive 6	Points
1st place, gold medalist(s)	Ooi Tze Liang (MAS)	72.85	77.55	77.00	71.40	81.00	74.80	454.60
2nd place, silver medalist(s)	Puteh Muhammad (MAS)	70.50	65.10	70.50	56.00	69.00	71.40	402.50
3rd place, bronze medalist(s)	Lee Han Ming Mark (SGP)	61.50	60.00	65.10	67.50	51.00	20.40	325.50
4	Nguyen Tung Duong (VIE)	46.80	57.00	55.80	55.35	44.00	48.30	307.25
5	Andriyan Andriyan (INA)	58.50	58.90	45.00	49.50	54.00	40.80	306.70
6	Francisco Deorelar (PHI)	57.00	49.50	46.80	54.00	33.00	60.45	300.75
7	Juntaphadawon Chawanwat (THA)	60.00	57.35	28.90	49.50	51.00	50.75	297.50
8	Marksin Thitipoom (THA)	36.00	51.50	54.40	54.00	42.00	57.75	295.30
9	Putra Adityo (INA)	61.50	60.45	51.00	37.50	21.60	59.50	291.55

==== Women's 3 metre springboard ====
Rank	Diver	Final					
Rank	Diver	Dive 1	Dive 2	Dive 3	Dive 4	Dive 5	Points
1st place, gold medalist(s)	Ng Yan Yee (MAS)	63.00	58.90	54.00	60.00	63.00	298.90
2nd place, silver medalist(s)	Jasmine Lai Pui Yee (MAS)	50.40	49.95	46.20	46.20	49.20	241.95
3rd place, bronze medalist(s)	Ngo Phuong Mai (VIE)	46.80	47.25	49.20	42.00	56.00	241.25
4	Freida Lim Shen Yan (SGP)	48.00	49.25	25.20	50.40	57.40	230.25
5	Monique Ann Demaisip (PHI)	33.75	32.20	44.55	52.50	39.60	202.6
6	Surincha Booranapol (THA)	48.60	42.00	28.00	28.00	40.80	187.4
7	Kwanchanok Khunboonjan (THA)	43.20	25.65	40.60	26.60	42.00	178.05
8	Rose Ann Ocmer (PHI)	32.00	43.20	48.60	7.00	42.00	172.80

=== Synchronised ===
==== Men's synchronised 3 metre springboard ====
Rank	Divers	Final						
Rank	Divers	Dive 1	Dive 2	Dive 3	Dive 4	Dive 5	Dive 6	Points
1st place, gold medalist(s)	Malaysia (MAS); Ooi Tze Liang; Chew Yiwei	50.40	49.80	70.68	73.26	75.48	78.54	398.16
2nd place, silver medalist(s)	Thailand (THA); Chawanwat Juntaphadawon; Thitipoom Marksin	44.40	39.60	62.31	66.30	63.90	68.25	344.76
3rd place, bronze medalist(s)	Singapore (SGP); Timothy Lee Han Kuan; Mark Lee Han Ming	49.80	47.40	66.60	62.10	66.03	48.60	340.53
4	Indonesia (INA); Adityo Putra; Tri Priambodo	47.40	42.60	59.40	58.59	48.60	62.10	318.69

==== Women's synchronised 3 metre springboard ====
Rank	Divers	Final					
Rank	Divers	Dive 1	Dive 2	Dive 3	Dive 4	Dive 5	Points
1st place, gold medalist(s)	Malaysia (MAS); Ng Yan Yee; Nur Dhabitah Sabri	46.80	46.80	56.70	55.80	63.90	270.00
2nd place, silver medalist(s)	Singapore (SGP); Fong Kay Yian; Tan Yi Xuan Ashlee	43.20	46.20	46.80	52.92	43.74	232.86
3rd place, bronze medalist(s)	Thailand (THA); Booranapol Surincha; Yanmongkon Ramanya	35.40	39.60	46.98	42.48	43.68	208.14
4	Philippines (PHI); Demaisip Monique Ann; Ocmer Rose Ann	42.60	41.40	48.96	53.46	0.00	186.42
