= Diving at the 2018 Asian Games – Women's synchronized 10 metre platform =

Women's synchronized 10 metre platform at the 2018 Asian Games
- Venue: Gelora Bung Karno Aquatic Stadium
- Date: 28 August 2018
- Competitors: 16 from 8 nations

Medalists
gold medal	Zhang Jiaqi; Zhang Minjie	China
silver medal	Kim Kuk-hyang; Kim Mi-rae	North Korea
bronze medal	Leong Mun Yee; Nur Dhabitah Sabri	Malaysia

The women's synchronized 10 metre platform competition at the 2018 Asian Games took place on 28 August 2018 at the Gelora Bung Karno Aquatic Stadium.

== Schedule ==
All times are Western Indonesia Time (UTC+07:00)

Date	Time	Event
Tuesday, 28 August 2018	18:45	Final

== Results ==
Rank	Team	Dive					Total
Rank	Team	1	2	3	4	5	Total
1st place, gold medalist(s)	China (CHN); Zhang Jiaqi; Zhang Minjie	56.40	54.00	80.10	85.44	85.44	361.38
2nd place, silver medalist(s)	North Korea (PRK); Kim Kuk-hyang; Kim Mi-rae	48.00	51.00	74.70	82.56	81.60	337.86
3rd place, bronze medalist(s)	Malaysia (MAS); Leong Mun Yee; Nur Dhabitah Sabri	46.80	48.00	72.00	72.96	71.04	310.80
4	Japan (JPN); Matsuri Arai; Minami Itahashi	46.20	43.80	63.00	75.60	72.96	301.56
5	South Korea (KOR); Cho Eun-bi; Moon Na-yun	47.40	43.80	62.16	61.77	63.00	278.13
6	Singapore (SGP); Myra Lee; Freida Lim	40.80	39.60	60.48	58.50	59.52	258.90
7	Indonesia (INA); Dewi Setyaningsih; Della Dinarsari Harimurti	38.40	38.40	47.70	45.24	39.36	209.10
8	Macau (MAC); Leong Sut Chan; Leong Sut In	40.80	39.00	44.16	41.25	40.80	206.01
