= Diving at the 2021 SEA Games =

- Venue: Mỹ Đình Aquatics Center
- Location: Hanoi, Vietnam
- Dates: 8–11 May 2022

Diving events at the 2021 SEA Games took place at Mỹ Đình Aquatics Center, in Hanoi, Vietnam from 8 to 11 May 2022. It is one of four aquatic sports at the Games, along with finswimming, swimming, and canoeing.

== Summary ==
Malaysia dominated the diving events again and won all the gold medals available again since the last SEA Games. Malaysia won eight gold medals, three silver medals and a bronze medal for a total of 12 medals. Singapore was second with a total of three silver medals and a bronze medal.

== Participating nations ==
- Malaysia
- Philippines
- Singapore
- Thailand
- Vietnam (host)

== Competition schedule ==
The following is the competition schedule for the diving competitions:

F	Final

Event↓/Date →	8th Sun	9th Mon	10th Tue	11th Wed
Men's 1 m springboard		F		
Men's 3 m springboard				F
Men's synchronised 3 m springboard	F			
Men's synchronised 10 m platform			F	
Women's 1 m springboard	F			
Women's 3 m springboard			F	
Women's synchronized 3 m springboard		F		
Women's synchronized 10 m platform				F

== Medal table ==
* Host nation (Vietnam)

Rank	Nation	Gold	Silver	Bronze	Total
1	Malaysia (MAS)	8	3	1	12
2	Singapore (SGP)	0	3	1	4
3	Vietnam (VIE)*	0	2	2	4
4	Thailand (THA)	0	0	1	1
Totals (4 entries)		8	8	5	21

== Medalists ==
=== Men ===
Event	Gold	Silver	Bronze
1 metre springboard	Ooi Tze Liang; Malaysia	Avvir Tham; Singapore	Bertrand Rhodict Lises; Malaysia
3 metre springboard	Muhammad Syafiq Puteh; Malaysia	Gabriel Gilbert Daim; Malaysia	Chawanwat Junthaphadawon; Thailand
Synchronized 3 metre springboard	Malaysia; Ooi Tze Liang; Chew Yiwei	Vietnam; Nguyễn Tùng Dương; Phương Thế Anh	—N/a
Synchronized 10 metre platform	Malaysia; Jellson Jabillin; Hanis Nazirul Jaya Surya	Singapore; Jonathan Chan; Max Lee	Vietnam; Nguyễn Quang Đạt; Đặng Hoàng Tú

=== Women ===
Event	Gold	Silver	Bronze
1 metre springboard	Nur Dhabitah Sabri; Malaysia	Kimberly Bong; Malaysia	Ngô Phương Mai; Vietnam
3 metre springboard	Ng Yan Yee; Malaysia	Ong Ker Yin; Malaysia	Fong Kay Yian; Singapore
Synchronized 3 metre springboard	Malaysia; Ng Yan Yee; Ong Ker Yin	Vietnam; Mai Hồng Hạnh; Ngô Phương Mai	Singapore; Ashlee Tan Yi Xuan; Fong Kay Yian
Synchronized 10 metre platform	Malaysia; Pandelela Rinong; Nur Dhabitah Sabri	Singapore; Ong Sze En; Ong Rei En	—N/a
