= Diving at the 2018 Asian Games – Men's 3 metre springboard =

Men's 3 metre springboard at the 2018 Asian Games
- Venue: Gelora Bung Karno Aquatic Stadium
- Date: 31 August 2018
- Competitors: 15 from 10 nations

Medalists
gold medal	Xie Siyi	China
silver medal	Cao Yuan	China
bronze medal	Chew Yiwei	Malaysia

The men's 3 metre springboard competition at the 2018 Asian Games took place on 31 August 2018 at the Gelora Bung Karno Aquatic Stadium.

== Schedule ==
All times are Western Indonesia Time (UTC+07:00)

Date	Time	Event
Friday, 31 August 2018	13:55	Preliminary
Friday, 31 August 2018	20:50	Final

== Results ==
=== Preliminary ===
Rank	Athlete	Dive						Total
Rank	Athlete	1	2	3	4	5	6	Total
1	Xie Siyi (CHN)	85.00	80.85	88.20	89.25	94.35	83.60	521.25
2	Cao Yuan (CHN)	81.60	84.00	94.50	90.00	68.25	96.90	515.25
3	Woo Ha-ram (KOR)	76.50	86.70	66.50	89.25	73.50	52.65	445.10
4	Sho Sakai (JPN)	75.00	75.00	71.40	72.00	80.50	69.75	443.65
5	Ooi Tze Liang (MAS)	68.20	70.95	56.00	76.50	63.00	81.60	416.25
6	Ken Terauchi (JPN)	69.00	67.50	74.25	66.00	78.20	58.90	413.85
7	Kim Yeong-nam (KOR)	67.50	49.30	64.35	68.00	84.00	53.20	386.35
8	Chew Yiwei (MAS)	69.75	74.80	28.00	70.50	64.35	73.10	380.50
9	Ramananda Sharma (IND)	48.05	57.00	54.00	63.00	62.90	61.20	346.15
10	Adityo Restu Putra (INA)	58.50	68.20	66.30	42.00	54.00	55.50	344.50
11	Chawanwat Juntaphadawon (THA)	58.50	54.25	60.00	58.50	46.50	66.30	344.05
12	Doston Botirov (UZB)	58.50	57.80	43.50	63.00	55.50	58.90	337.20
13	Aldinsyah Putra Rafi (INA)	60.00	60.45	57.80	52.50	46.50	43.50	320.75
14	Abdulaziz Balghaith (QAT)	42.00	48.60	32.20	40.50	43.40	42.00	248.70
15	Tang Hio Fong (MAC)	43.20	49.95	34.80	32.20	43.20	41.25	244.60

=== Final ===
Rank	Athlete	Dive						Total
Rank	Athlete	1	2	3	4	5	6	Total
1st place, gold medalist(s)	Xie Siyi (CHN)	88.40	74.25	97.20	91.00	105.45	104.50	560.80
2nd place, silver medalist(s)	Cao Yuan (CHN)	83.30	89.25	94.50	88.20	93.60	91.20	540.05
3rd place, bronze medalist(s)	Chew Yiwei (MAS)	69.75	74.80	82.25	72.00	79.20	78.20	456.20
4	Ken Terauchi (JPN)	73.50	67.50	75.90	72.00	68.00	74.40	431.30
5	Sho Sakai (JPN)	73.50	76.50	71.40	72.00	63.00	74.40	430.80
6	Woo Ha-ram (KOR)	76.50	79.90	53.20	78.75	72.00	62.40	422.75
7	Ooi Tze Liang (MAS)	74.40	74.25	59.50	51.00	77.40	76.50	413.05
8	Kim Yeong-nam (KOR)	72.00	68.00	74.25	71.40	78.75	41.80	406.20
9	Adityo Restu Putra (INA)	64.50	72.85	71.40	67.50	63.00	64.50	403.75
10	Doston Botirov (UZB)	63.00	35.70	61.50	60.00	60.00	55.80	336.00
11	Chawanwat Juntaphadawon (THA)	61.50	62.00	63.00	63.00	36.00	42.50	328.00
12	Ramananda Sharma (IND)	60.45	58.50	37.50	58.50	66.30	44.20	325.45
