= Diving at the 2014 Asian Games – Men's synchronized 10 metre platform =

Sports competition event

Men's synchronized 10 metre platform at the 2014 Asian Games
- Venue: Munhak Park Tae-hwan Aquatics Center
- Date: 29 September 2014
- Competitors: 12 from 6 nations

Medalists
gold medal	Zhang Yanquan; Chen Aisen	China
silver medal	Kim Yeong-nam; Woo Ha-ram	South Korea
bronze medal	Chew Yiwei; Ooi Tze Liang	Malaysia

The men's synchronized 10 metre platform diving competition at the 2014 Asian Games in Incheon was held on 29 September 2014 at the Munhak Park Tae-hwan Aquatics Center.

== Schedule ==
All times are Korea Standard Time (UTC+09:00)

Date	Time	Event
Monday, 29 September 2014	16:00	Final

== Results ==
Rank	Team	Dive						Total
Rank	Team	1	2	3	4	5	6	Total
1st place, gold medalist(s)	China (CHN); Zhang Yanquan; Chen Aisen	54.00	55.80	83.64	91.80	85.32	92.34	462.90
2nd place, silver medalist(s)	South Korea (KOR); Kim Yeong-nam; Woo Ha-ram	49.80	49.80	72.42	79.92	74.88	76.68	403.50
3rd place, bronze medalist(s)	Malaysia (MAS); Chew Yiwei; Ooi Tze Liang	49.20	48.60	72.90	71.04	67.32	75.84	384.90
4	North Korea (PRK); Hyon Il-myong; Ri Hyon-ju	50.40	41.40	65.70	75.84	68.04	77.76	379.14
5	Japan (JPN); Kazuki Murakami; Yu Okamoto	49.20	49.20	72.90	75.84	54.00	74.88	376.02
6	Qatar (QAT); Mohammed Shewaiter; Abdulaziz Balghaith	42.00	34.80	51.33	47.70	57.60	38.88	272.31
