= Water polo at the 2019 SEA Games =

- Venue: New Clark City Aquatics Center
- Location: Capas, Tarlac, Philippines
- Date: 26 November – 1 December
- Competitors: 101 from 5 nations

Medalists
gold medal	Indonesia men
gold medal	Thailand women

The water polo competitions at the 2019 SEA Games took place at the New Clark City Aquatics Center, New Clark City, Capas, Tarlac, Philippines. It was one of four aquatic sports at the Games, along with diving, swimming, and open water swimming. The 2019 Games featured one water polo competition each for men's teams and women's teams.

The next water polo competition was in 2023 because it was not part of the 2021 SEA Games.

== Participating nations ==
A total of 101 athletes from 5 nations participated (the numbers of athletes are shown in parentheses). The Filipino, Singaporean and Thai teams entered both the men's and women's competition. All other teams played in men's tournament.

- Indonesia (13)
- Malaysia (13)
- Philippines (23)
- Singapore (26)
- Thailand (26)

== Competition schedule ==
The following is the schedule for the water polo competitions. Men's teams go through a single round robin tournament, while women's teams go through a double round robin tournament.

RR	Round robin	DRR	Double round robin

Event	Tue 26	Wed 27	Thu 28	Fri 29	Sat 30	Sun 1
Men	RR	RR	RR	RR		RR
Women	DRR	DRR	DRR	DRR		DRR

== Medal summary ==
=== Medal table ===
* Host nation (Philippines)

Rank	Nation	Gold	Silver	Bronze	Total
1	Indonesia (INA)	1	0	0	1
1	Thailand (THA)	1	0	0	1
3	Philippines (PHI)*	0	1	1	2
3	Singapore (SGP)	0	1	1	2
Totals (4 entries)		2	2	2	6

=== Medalists ===
Event	Gold	Silver	Bronze
Men's tournament	Indonesia (INA); Rezza Putra; Ridjkie Mulia; Beby Willy Paksi Tarigam; Delvin Felliciano; Silvester Manik; Zaenal Arifin; Yusuf Budiman; Rian Rinaldo; Andi Uwayzulqarni; Fakhri Mahmud; Novian Putra; Made Dwicahya Arsana; Mochammad Alfariz	Philippines (PHI); Tani Gomez Jr; Abnel Amiladjid; Mico Anota; Romark Johnson Belo; Teodoro Roy Cañete Jr; Adan Gonzales; Macgyver Reyes; Reynaldo Salonga Jr; Juan Paolo Serrano; Vincent Sicat; Mark Jerwin Valdez; Matthew Royce Yu; Mummar Alamara	Singapore (SGP); Koh Jian Ying; Goh Wen Zhe; Ang An Jun; Darren Lee Jit-An; Lee Chang-Kang; Lee Kai Yang; Tang Yee Heng; Chow Jing Lun; Ooi Yee Jia; Nathanael Wayne Chong; Jayden See Tein Ee; Yu Junjie; Chiam Kunyang
Women's tournament	Thailand (THA); Alwani Sathitanon; Arisara Minsri; Chayanan Khramyoo; Issaree Turon; Janista Thinwilai; Kaithip Saeteaw; Khemasiri Sirivejjabandh; Napason Mouksung; Nirawan Chompoopuen; Panchita Rodwattanadisakul; Poonnada Rotchanarut; Thitirat Somyos; Varistha Saraikrarn	Singapore (SGP); Abielle Yeo Zhi Min; Angeline Teo Yi Ling; Chow Yan Teng; Gina Koh Ting Yi; Koh Ting Ting; Koh Xiao Li; Melissa Chan Pei Tung; Michelle Tan Ting Yee; Mounisha Devi Manivannan; Nadyn Kei Thinagaran; Ong Cheng Jing; Ong Xuan Rong; Pek Meng Yee	Philippines (PHI); Christine Grace Hipol; Haden Skye Alysabeth Bates; Kieran Scout Noelle Bates; Monica Estelle Chernoff; Krystal Rae De la Cruz; Hannah Marie Fonacier; Carla Beatriz Grabador; Jobelyn Ocampo; Nadia Paquin; Gabriella Sicat

== Men's competition ==
The tournament featured 5 countries. The format was the same as 2017; there was a group of five with round-robin format. The top three of group received medals.

=== Round-robin ===
Pos	Team	Pld	W	D	L	GF	GA	GD	Pts	Final Result
1	Indonesia	4	3	1	0	44	30	+14	7	Gold medal
2	Philippines (H)	4	2	2	0	36	27	+9	6	Silver medal
3	Singapore	4	2	1	1	42	25	+17	5	Bronze medal
4	Thailand	4	1	0	3	42	43	−1	2	
5	Malaysia	4	0	0	4	28	67	−39	0	

Source: WATERPOLO MEN - GROUP B
(H) Hosts

== Women's competition ==
This tournament featured only 3 countries, unlike the 2017 edition, where there were 5 countries who participated.

=== Double round-robin ===
Pos	Team	Pld	W	D	L	GF	GA	GD	Pts	Final Result
1	Thailand	4	4	0	0	90	14	+76	8	Gold medal
2	Singapore	4	2	0	2	38	54	−16	4	Silver medal
3	Philippines (H)	4	0	0	4	22	82	−60	0	Bronze medal

Source: Schedule & Results
(H) Hosts
