= Diving at the 2014 Asian Games – Men's synchronized 3 metre springboard =

Men's synchronized 3 metre springboard at the 2014 Asian Games
- Venue: Munhak Park Tae-hwan Aquatics Center
- Date: 30 September 2014
- Competitors: 14 from 7 nations

Medalists
gold medal	Cao Yuan; Lin Yue	China
silver medal	Ahmad Amsyar Azman; Ooi Tze Liang	Malaysia
bronze medal	Kim Yeong-nam; Woo Ha-ram	South Korea

The men's synchronized 3 metre springboard diving competition at the 2014 Asian Games in Incheon was held on 30 September at the Munhak Park Tae-hwan Aquatics Center.

== Schedule ==
All times are Korea Standard Time (UTC+09:00)

Date	Time	Event
Tuesday, 30 September 2014	16:00	Final

== Results ==
Rank	Team	Dive						Total
Rank	Team	1	2	3	4	5	6	Total
1st place, gold medalist(s)	China (CHN); Cao Yuan; Lin Yue	53.40	53.40	81.60	92.40	90.30	89.76	460.86
2nd place, silver medalist(s)	Malaysia (MAS); Ahmad Amsyar Azman; Ooi Tze Liang	49.20	49.80	67.89	79.56	79.80	79.56	405.81
3rd place, bronze medalist(s)	South Korea (KOR); Kim Yeong-nam; Woo Ha-ram	49.80	46.20	75.60	73.47	77.52	76.50	399.09
4	Japan (JPN); Yu Okamoto; Ken Terauchi	51.00	48.00	75.60	75.48	71.10	75.33	396.51
5	Hong Kong (HKG); Chow Ho Wing; Jason Poon	42.60	43.80	63.00	65.10	59.64	61.20	335.34
6	Kuwait (KUW); Abdulrahman Abbas; Hasan Qali	42.60	45.00	59.40	55.80	59.40	63.90	326.10
7	Qatar (QAT); Shady Salah Abdelhamid; Abdulaziz Balghaith	40.20	37.20	46.20	56.70	60.30	40.50	281.10
