= Fencing at the 2019 SEA Games =

- Venue: World Trade Center Metro Manila
- Location: Pasay, Philippines
- Date: 3–8 December

Fencing competitions at the 2019 SEA Games in Philippines were held at the World Trade Center Metro Manila from 3 to 8 December 2019.

== Medal table ==
* Host nation (Philippines)

Rank	nation	Gold	Silver	Bronze	Total
1	Singapore (SGP)	4	3	6	13
2	Vietnam (VIE)	4	2	4	10
3	Philippines (PHI)*	2	2	7	11
4	Thailand (THA)	2	2	5	9
5	Malaysia (MAS)	0	2	1	3
6	Indonesia (INA)	0	1	1	2
Totals (6 entries)		12	12	24	48

== Medalists ==
=== Men ===
Event	Gold	Silver	Bronze
Individual épée	Nguyễn Tiến Nhật; Vietnam	Koh I Jie; Malaysia	Noelito Jose Jr. Philippines
Individual épée	Nguyễn Tiến Nhật; Vietnam	Koh I Jie; Malaysia	Nguyễn Phước Đến; Vietnam
Team épée	Vietnam; Đặng Tuấn Anh; Nguyễn Phước Đến; Nguyễn Tiến Nhật; Trương Trần Nhật Minh	Singapore; Jefferson Cheong; Samson Lee; Simon Lee; Tan Weixuan	Indonesia; Anggi Williansyah; Indra Jaya Kusuma; Nuraya Kadafie
Team épée	Vietnam; Đặng Tuấn Anh; Nguyễn Phước Đến; Nguyễn Tiến Nhật; Trương Trần Nhật Minh	Singapore; Jefferson Cheong; Samson Lee; Simon Lee; Tan Weixuan	Thailand; Kantaphat Anupongkunkit; Chinnaphat Chaloemchanen; Korakote Juengamnuaychai; Nattiphong Singkham
Individual foil	Chornnasun Mayakarn; Thailand	Hans Yoong; Malaysia	Nathaniel Perez; Philippines
Individual foil	Chornnasun Mayakarn; Thailand	Hans Yoong; Malaysia	Joshua Ian Lim; Singapore
Team foil	Singapore; Kevin Jerrold Chan; Joshua Ian Lim; Darren Tan; Jet Ng	Thailand; Ratchanavi Deejing; Chornnasun Mayakarn; Phatthanaphong Srisawat; Suppakorn Sritang-orn	Malaysia; Hydeer Akson; Adam Tahir Johan; Xing Han Cheng; Hans Yoong
Team foil	Singapore; Kevin Jerrold Chan; Joshua Ian Lim; Darren Tan; Jet Ng	Thailand; Ratchanavi Deejing; Chornnasun Mayakarn; Phatthanaphong Srisawat; Suppakorn Sritang-orn	Philippines; Shawn Felipe; Michael Nicanor; Nathaniel Perez; Jaime Viceo
Individual sabre	Vũ Thành An; Vietnam	Christian Concepcion; Philippines	Clive Leu; Singapore
Individual sabre	Vũ Thành An; Vietnam	Christian Concepcion; Philippines	Voragun Srinualnad; Thailand
Team sabre	Vietnam; Nguyễn Văn Quyết; Nguyễn Xuân Lợi; Tô Đức Anh; Vũ Thành An	Thailand; Ruangrit Haekerd; Soravit Kitsiriboon; Voragun Srinualnad; Panachai Wiriyatangsakul	Philippines; Eric Brando II; Christian Concepcion; Donnie Navarro; Eunice Villanueva
Team sabre	Vietnam; Nguyễn Văn Quyết; Nguyễn Xuân Lợi; Tô Đức Anh; Vũ Thành An	Thailand; Ruangrit Haekerd; Soravit Kitsiriboon; Voragun Srinualnad; Panachai Wiriyatangsakul	Singapore; Choy Yu Yong; Fong Zheng Jie; Clive Leu; Ahmad Huzaifah Saharudin

=== Women ===
Event	Gold	Silver	Bronze
Individual épée	Kiria Tikanah; Singapore	Hanniel Abella; Philippines	Cheryl Lim; Singapore
Individual épée	Kiria Tikanah; Singapore	Hanniel Abella; Philippines	Nguyễn Thị Như Hoa; Vietnam
Team épée	Philippines; Hanniel Abella; Mickyle Bustos; Anna Estimada; Harlene Raguin	Singapore; Kiria Tikanah; Cheryl Lim; Victoria Lim; Rebecca Ong	Thailand; Kanyapat Meechai; Wijitta Takhamwong; Korawan Thanee; Pacharaporn Vasanasomsithi
Team épée	Philippines; Hanniel Abella; Mickyle Bustos; Anna Estimada; Harlene Raguin	Singapore; Kiria Tikanah; Cheryl Lim; Victoria Lim; Rebecca Ong	Vietnam; Nguyễn Thị Như Hoa; Nguyễn Thị Trang; Trần Thị Thùy Trinh; Vũ Thị Hồng
Individual foil	Amita Berthier; Singapore	Maxine Wong; Singapore	Samantha Catantan; Philippines
Individual foil	Amita Berthier; Singapore	Maxine Wong; Singapore	Đỗ Thị Anh; Vietnam
Team foil	Singapore; Amita Berthier; Denyse Chan; Maxine Wong; Tatiana Wong	Vietnam; Đỗ Thị Anh; Lưu Thị Thanh Nhàn; Nguyễn Thị Thu Phương; Nguyễn Thu Phương	Philippines; Samantha Catantan; Maxine Esteban; Wilhelmina Lozada; Justine Gail Tinio
Team foil	Singapore; Amita Berthier; Denyse Chan; Maxine Wong; Tatiana Wong	Vietnam; Đỗ Thị Anh; Lưu Thị Thanh Nhàn; Nguyễn Thị Thu Phương; Nguyễn Thu Phương	Thailand; Nunta Chantasuvannasin; Sasinpat Doungpattra; Chayanutphat Shinnakerdchoke; Ploypailin Thongchampa
Individual sabre	Jylyn Nicanor; Philippines	Diah Permatasari; Indonesia	Jolie Lee; Singapore
Individual sabre	Jylyn Nicanor; Philippines	Diah Permatasari; Indonesia	Tonpan Pokeaw; Thailand
Team sabre	Thailand; Pornsawan Ngernrungruangroj; Tonpan Pokeaw; Tonkhaw Phokaew; Bandhita Srinualnad	Vietnam; Bùi Thị Thu Hà; Đỗ Thị Tâm; Lê Minh Hằng; Phùng Thị Khánh Linh	Singapore; Ann Lee; Jolie Lee; Lee Kar Moon; Jessica Ong
Team sabre	Thailand; Pornsawan Ngernrungruangroj; Tonpan Pokeaw; Tonkhaw Phokaew; Bandhita Srinualnad	Vietnam; Bùi Thị Thu Hà; Đỗ Thị Tâm; Lê Minh Hằng; Phùng Thị Khánh Linh	Philippines; Kemberly Camahalan; Allaine Cortey; Queen Dalmacio; Jylyn Nicanor
