= Jet Ng =

Singaporean fencer

Personal information
- Full name: Jet Ng Shang Fei
- Born: 10 May 1998 (age 28) Singapore
- Height: 1.81 m (5 ft 11 1/2 in)
- Weight: 78 kg (172 lb; 12.3 st)

Fencing career
- Sport: Fencing
- Weapon: Foil
- Hand: right-handed
- Club: Z Fencing International Academy/Waseda University Fencing Club
- Head coach: Joseph Engert
Medal record
Representing Singapore
Southeast Asian Games
Bronze medal – third place	2017 Malaysia	Fencing at the 2017 Southeast Asian Games
Gold medal – first place	2019 Philippines	Fencing at the 2019 Southeast Asian Games

Jet Ng (born 10 May 1998) is a former Singaporean foil fencer. He won a bronze and gold medal in the men's foil individual event during the 2017 SEA Games and 2019 SEA Games respectively. Ng retired from competitive fencing after the 2019 SEA Games but continued to fence for his school.

== Education ==
Ng attended Tao Nan School, Victoria School and Meridian Junior College. Ng attended Waseda University in Tokyo, Japan from 2019 to 2023, graduating with a Bachelors in Arts. He currently attends Waseda University's Graduate School of Sport Sciences as a PhD Candidate in Sports Medicine.

== Career ==
Ng attained a 5th-place finish at the 2015 Cadet World Championships (men's foil), the then-highest achieved by a Singaporean fencer, before Ywen Lau won the 2016 Cadet World Championships in Women's Sabre. He won multiple Cadet (U17) and Junior (U20) medals in Asian and Southeast Asian competitions.

Ng made his SEA Games debut in 2017, winning an individual bronze medal in the men's foil individual event. In 2019, Ng won the gold medal at the men's foil team event at the 2019 SEA Games held in the Philippines.

Ng retired internationally after the 2019 SEA Games, after multiple anterior talofibular ligament, medial collateral ligament and anterior cruciate ligament injuries. He competed for his school until 2022, but did not train. He achieved an All-Japan Bronze medal in 2021, as well as multiple Inter College medals until his full retirement in 2022.

== Personal life ==
Ng picked up fencing at age 8 when emulating the characters of the Star Wars franchise, which he is a fan.

He is the nephew of veteran actress, Huang Bi Ren.

== International Awards ==
In addition to winning multiple National Championships and medals, Ng also had success on the international stage.

- 2013 Asian U17 Championships - Bronze
- 2013 Southeast Asian U17 Championships - Bronze
- 2014 Southeast Asian U20 Championships - Bronze
- 2014 Southeast Asian U17 Championships - Silver
- 2015 Asian U20 Championships - Bronze
- 2015 Asian U17 Championships - Silver
- 2017 Southeast Asian Games - Bronze
- 2018 Asian U20 Championships - Silver
- 2019 Southeast Asian Games - Gold
