= World Trade Center Metro Manila =

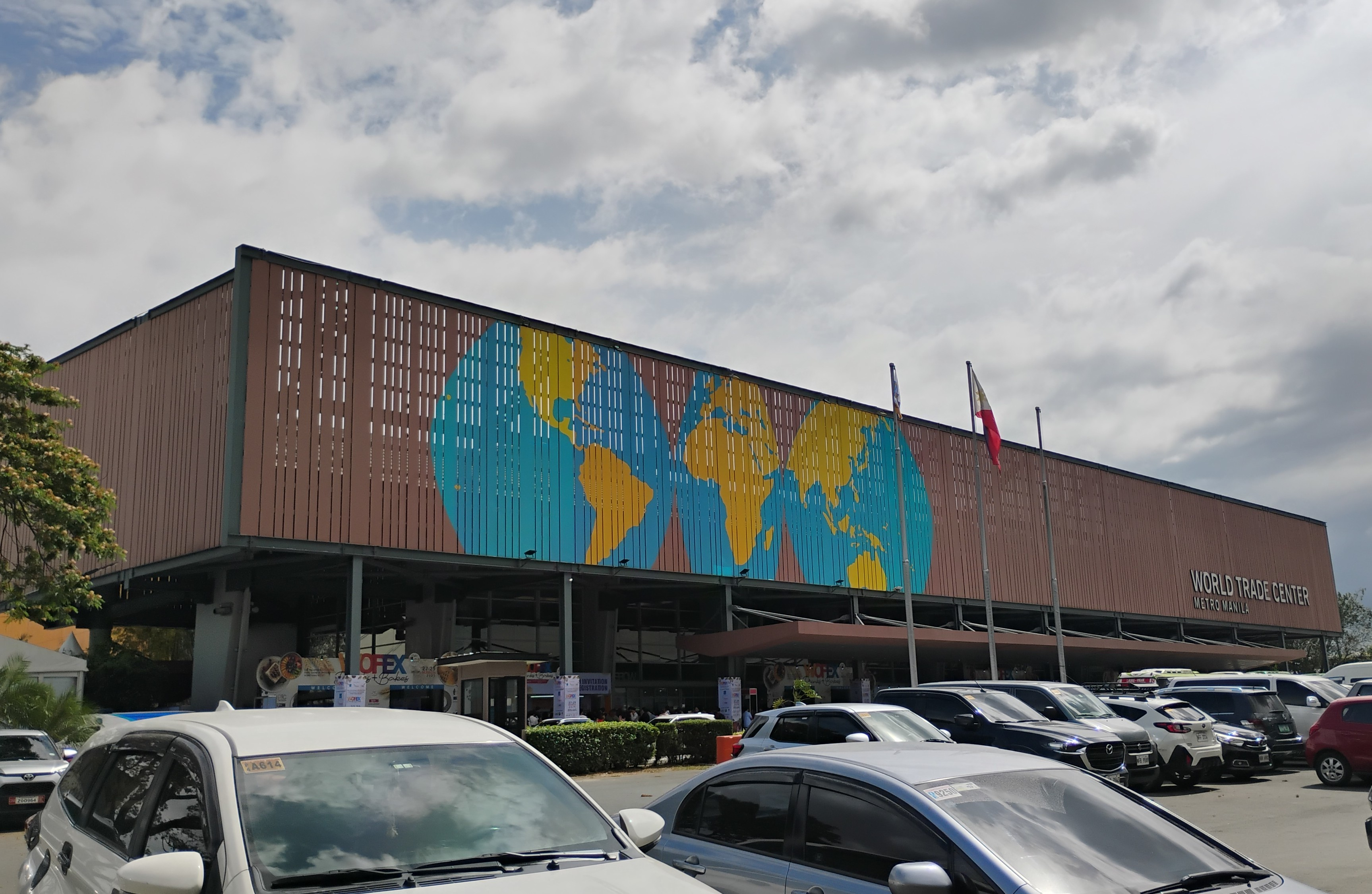
- Alternative names: WTCMM

General information
- Status: Completed
- Location: Gil Puyat Avenue Extension cor. Macapagal Boulevard, Financial Center Area, Bay City, Pasay, Metro Manila, Philippines
- Coordinates: 14.550666°N 120.987636°E
- Inaugurated: October 28, 1996
- Owner: Investment & Capital Corporation of the Philippines (ICCP) (Manila Exposition Complex, Inc.)

Technical details
- Floor area: 16,500 m^{2} (178,000 sq ft)
- Grounds: 21,000 m^{2} (230,000 sq ft)

Design and construction
- Architecture firm: Gensler and Associates

Other information
- Seating capacity: 9,697 (Event Hall)

Website
- http://wtcmanila.com.ph/

World Trade Center Metro Manila (WTCMM) is an exhibition center located in Pasay, Metro Manila, Philippines. The first phase of the venue was inaugurated by then President Fidel Ramos on October 28, 1996.

WTCMM is the preferred venue by international and local organizers for important international events and exhibitions in the Philippines. Notable events are the Asia Pacific Economic Cooperation meeting in 1996 and 2015; the ASEAN Summit Official International Media Center; National Women's Summit, where about 15,000 delegates were in attendance including then-US First Lady Hillary Clinton, the Guest of Honor; the Philippine Economic Basin Dinner reception that prominent foreign economic ministers of Asia attended; the country show of France dubbed as "Le Rendezvous de France", where replicas of the Eiffel tower and The Louvre museum were built inside the hall; and the Philippine Councilors League (PCL) National Convention attended by 12,000 councilors from all over the country; and the 2019 Southeast Asian Games for fencing, karate, and wushu.

It is also home to several prestigious events such as Manila FAME, IFEX of Citem, PROPAK, WOFEX, WorldBex, Philconstuct, ADAS, Trucks and Logistics, Livestock, Agrilink and Auto Parts and Vehicle Expo, and a favored venue for corporate events such as Puregold Sari-sari Store Convention, Sun Life events, McDonald's Kiddie Crew Graduation, Coca-Cola, Shell, among others as well as foreign concerts and other events.

A pioneer in the provision of world-class exhibition venue in the Philippines, WTCMM is an accredited member of the World Trade Centers Association (WTCA) headquartered in New York City, USA. It belongs to a global network of over 300 World Trade Centers Association in nearly 100 countries worldwide. WTCMM is the first exhibition venue in the country to be managed by an ISO 9001:2008 company, Manila Exposition Complex, Inc., and the first to be recognized and is now a member of Union des Foires Internationales (UFI), the global association of the exhibition industry.

WTCMM is an accredited MICE venue of the Department of Tourism (DOT) and Tourism Promotions Board (TPB), a member of the Tourism Congress of the Philippines (TCP) and the Philippine Association of Convention Exhibition Organizers and Suppliers (PACEOS).

The World Trade Center Metro Manila was commercial setting of Lay's potato chips flavor Tomato Ketchup the Taste of America for the flavor Chili Lime the Taste of Mexico and flavor Spicy the Taste of Korea in the Flavors of the World.
