= Amita Berthier =

Singaporean fencer (born 2000)

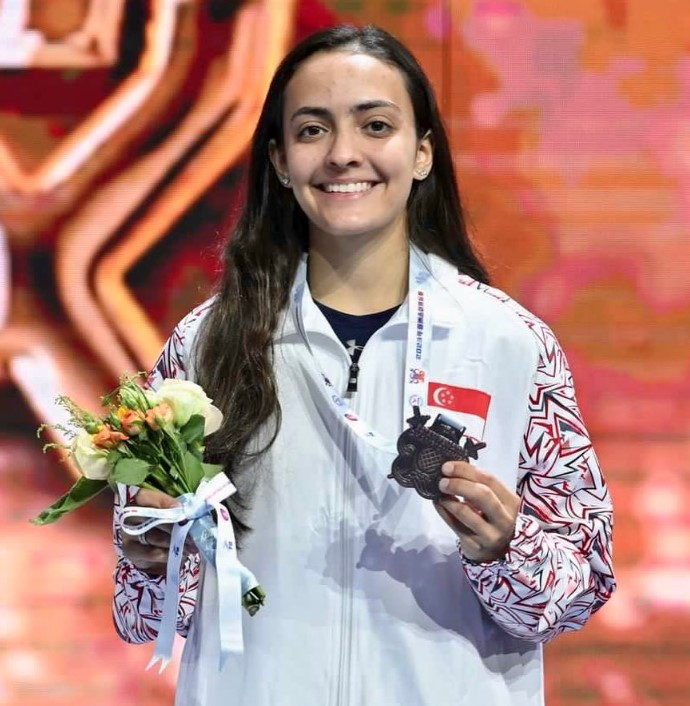

Personal information
- Full name: Amita Marie Nicolette Berthier
- Born: 15 December 2000 (age 25) Singapore

Sport
- Sport: Fencing
- Rank: 28
Medal record
Asian Games
Bronze medal – third place	2018 Indonesia	Team foil
Asian Fencing Championships
Bronze medal – third place	2023 Wuxi	Individual
Bronze medal – third place	2025 Bali	Team
Southeast Asian Games
Gold medal – first place	2017 Malaysia	Individual foil
Gold medal – first place	2019 Philippines	Individual foil
Gold medal – first place	2019 Philippines	Team foil
Gold medal – first place	2025 Thailand	Individual foil
Gold medal – first place	2025 Thailand	Team foil
Representing the Notre Dame Fighting Irish
Event	1st	2nd	3rd
NCAA Championships	0	1	3
Total	0	1	3

Amita Marie Nicolette Berthier OLY (born 15 December 2000) is a Singaporean, left-handed foil fencer. Representing the University of Notre Dame Berthier won four individual NCAA Fencing Championships medals. Representing Singapore, Berthier had won five SEA Games gold medals and qualified for two Olympic Games.

== Education ==
Berthier studied at the Singapore Sports School. She later attended the University of Notre Dame from 2018 to 2023 and pursued a sociology degree.

== Career ==
On 16 December 2017, Berthier became the first Singaporean fencer to win a Junior World Cup title at the Havana leg in Cuba in the eight-leg series.

=== 2018 to 2024 ===
Berthier won four individual NCAA Fencing Championships medals during her time at the University of Notre Dame. As she was studying in the United States, Berthier did not join the Singapore contingent for the 2021 and 2023 SEA Games.

==== 2022 Summer Olympics ====
In April 2021, Berthier qualified for the Singapore Olympic team at the 2020 Summer Olympics, by winning the Asia-Oceania Olympic Qualification Tournament held in Tashkent, Uzbekistan. In doing so, she became the first Singaporean to secure an Olympic spot through a qualifying tournament. Berthier was knocked out in her debut match in the round of 32 by United States' Lee Kiefer.

=== 2023 ===
In 2023, Berthier won a joint-bronze in the women’s foil at the 2023 Asian Fencing Championships held in Wuxi, China. She was then chosen alongside wushu athlete Jowen Lim as the flagbearers for the 2022 Asian Games held at Hangzhou, China in 2023. Berthier was eliminated in the women’s individual foil quarter-finals.

=== 2024 Summer Olympics ===
On 17 March 2024, Berthier qualified for the Paris Olympics via her individual ranking points. Ranked 28th in the world in the women’s foil, she claimed points at the International Fencing Federation (FIE) Grand Prix in Washington DC by finishing joint-20th.

Berthier returned to Singapore to train with national foil head coach Oleg Matseichuk as her coach. She parted ways with her previous coach Amgad Khazbak who also worked with Kiefer and was unable to be with Berthier during tournaments and the Olympics Games due to the conflict of interest.

Berthier trained with the Singapore national team's foil head coach, Oleg Matseichuk, for 3 months as part of her preparations for the Paris Olympics. Berthier was again eliminated in the round of 32 after a 13-15 loss to world number 11, United States' Lauren Scruggs.

=== 2025 ===
==== Asian Fencing Championships ====
Berthier clinched a joint-bronze medal in the team foil event together with team mates, Maxine Wong, Cheung Kemei and Stephanie Lee. She had earlier bowed out in the round of 32 after losing 15-6 to New Zealand’s world No. 290 Ruby Chan in the individual foil event.

==== SEA Games ====
In the 2025 SEA Games held in Thailand, Berthier won her third individual foil gold. She also won the gold in the women's team foil with team mates Maxine Wong Jie Xin, Cheung Kemei and Stephanie Lee Tingyi.
