= Ahmad Amsyar Azman =

Malaysian diver (born 1992)

Personal information
- Full name: Ahmad Amsyar bin Azman
- Born: 28 August 1992 (age 34) Perlis, Malaysia
- Height: 163 cm (5 ft 4 in)
- Weight: 63 kg (139 lb)
Medal record
Men's diving
Representing Malaysia
Asian Games
Silver medal – second place	2014 Incheon	3 m synchro springboard
Southeast Asian Games
Gold medal – first place	2013 Naypyidaw	3 m synchro springboard
Gold medal – first place	2015 Singapore	3 m synchro springboard
Gold medal – first place	2017 Kuala Lumpur	1 m springboard
Gold medal – first place	2017 Kuala Lumpur	3 m synchro springboard
Silver medal – second place	2017 Kuala Lumpur	3 m springboard
Bronze medal – third place	2011 Palembang	3 m springboard

Ahmad Amsyar bin Azman (born 28 August 1992) is a retired Malaysian diver. Azman was in 12th place in the preliminary round of the 3m springboard in the 2016 Olympic Games, but after his dive went wrong, he was knocked out of the contest.
