= Diving at the 2019 SEA Games =

- Venue: New Clark City Aquatics Center, Capas
- Dates: 6–7 December
- Competitors: 24 from 6 nations

Diving events at the 2019 SEA Games was held in New Clark City Aquatics Center, in Capas, Philippines from 6 to 7 December 2019. It is one of four aquatic sports at the Games, along with open water swimming, swimming, and water polo.

Malaysia won all 4 gold medals available.

== Participating nations ==
- Philippines (3)
- Malaysia (6)
- Singapore (5)
- Vietnam (2)
- Thailand (5)
- Indonesia (3)

== Competition schedule ==
The following is the competition schedule for the diving competitions:

F	Final

Event↓/Date →	6th Fri	7th Sat
Women's 3 m springboard	F	
Men's synchronised 3 m springboard	F	
Men's 3 m springboard		F
Women's synchronized 3 m springboard		F

== Medalists ==
=== Men ===
Event	Gold	Silver	Bronze
3 metre springboard	Ooi Tze Liang; Malaysia	Muhd Syafiq Puteh; Malaysia	Mark Lee Han Ming; Singapore
Synchronized 3 metre springboard	Malaysia; Ooi Tze Liang; Chew Yiwei	Thailand; Chawanwat Juntaphadawon; Thitipoom Marksin	Singapore; Timothy Lee Han Kuan; Mark Lee Han Ming

=== Women ===
Event	Gold	Silver	Bronze
3 metre springboard	Ng Yan Yee; Malaysia	Jasmine Lai Pui Yee; Malaysia	Ngô Phương Mai; Vietnam
Synchronized 3 metre springboard	Malaysia; Ng Yan Yee; Nur Dhabitah Sabri	Singapore; Fong Kay Yian; Ashlee Tan Yi Xuan	Thailand; Surincha Booranapol; Ramanya Yanmongkon

== Medal table ==
* Host nation (Philippines)

Rank	Nation	Gold	Silver	Bronze	Total
1	Malaysia (MAS)	4	2	0	6
2	Singapore (SGP)	0	1	2	3
3	Thailand (THA)	0	1	1	2
4	Vietnam (VIE)	0	0	1	1
Totals (4 entries)		4	4	4	12
