= Eka Purnama Indah =

Indonesian diver

Personal information
- Nationality: Indonesian
- Born: 27 May 1983 (age 41)

Sport
- Sport: Diving

Eka Purnama Indah (born 27 May 1983) is an Indonesian diver. She competed in the women's 3 metre springboard event at the 2000 Summer Olympics.
