= Nur Dhabitah Sabri =

Malaysian diver (born 1999)

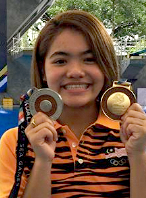
- Dhabitah at the 2017 Southeast Asian Games

Personal information
- Full name: Nur Dhabitah binti Sabri
- Born: 12 July 1999 (age 26) Kuala Lumpur, Malaysia
- Height: 1.53 m (5 ft 0 in)
- Spouse: Jiggy Masin (m. 2023)

Sport
- Country: Malaysia
- Sport: Diving
- Event(s): 3 m, 3 m synchro, 10 m, 10 m synchro
Medal record
Diving
Representing Malaysia
World Championships
Bronze medal – third place	2022 Budapest	10 m synchro
Commonwealth Games
Silver medal – second place	2022 Birmingham	3 m synchro springboard
Silver medal – second place	2022 Birmingham	3 m springboard
Bronze medal – third place	2014 Glasgow	10 m synchro platform
Bronze medal – third place	2018 Gold Coast	3 m synchro springboard
Bronze medal – third place	2018 Gold Coast	10 m synchro platform
Bronze medal – third place	2022 Birmingham	3 m mixed synchro
Asian Games
Silver medal – second place	2022 Hangzhou	3 m synchro springboard
Silver medal – second place	2018 Jakarta-Palembang	3 m synchro springboard
Bronze medal – third place	2018 Jakarta-Palembang	3 m springboard
Bronze medal – third place	2018 Jakarta-Palembang	10 m synchro platform
Bronze medal – third place	2022 Hangzhou	10 m synchro platform
Southeast Asian Games
Gold medal – first place	2013 Naypyidaw	10 m synchro platform
Gold medal – first place	2015 Singapore	3 m synchro springboard
Gold medal – first place	2017 Kuala Lumpur	3 m springboard
Gold medal – first place	2019 Philippines	3 m synchro springboard
Gold medal – first place	2021 Hanoi	1 m springboard
Gold medal – first place	2021 Hanoi	10 m synchro platform

Nur Dhabitah binti Sabri AMW (born 12 July 1999) is a Malaysian diver. She is the youngest Malaysian diver to champion two senior international competitions.

== Early and personal life ==
Dhabitah was born in Kuala Lumpur, Malaysia to Sabri Hashim and Fazidah Jaafar. She is the youngest among four siblings. Initially, she started her aquatic exposure through swimming clubs. After several competitions, her father decided to switch her into diving due to her small physique. She learned swimming and diving together with her older brother, Muhammad Danial Sabri. Both of them were planning to debut internationally together but were unable due to Danial's traumatic physical injury sustained before the debut. She occasionally practices and delves into extreme sport such as parkour and trampoline as a hobby. Dhabitah is currently pursuing her studies in Media Communications at the National University of Malaysia.

Dhabitah was previously in a relationship with Malaysian footballer Azhar Apandi, which ended in 2021. She married Malaysian actor Jiggy Masin, on 28 April 2023.

== Career ==
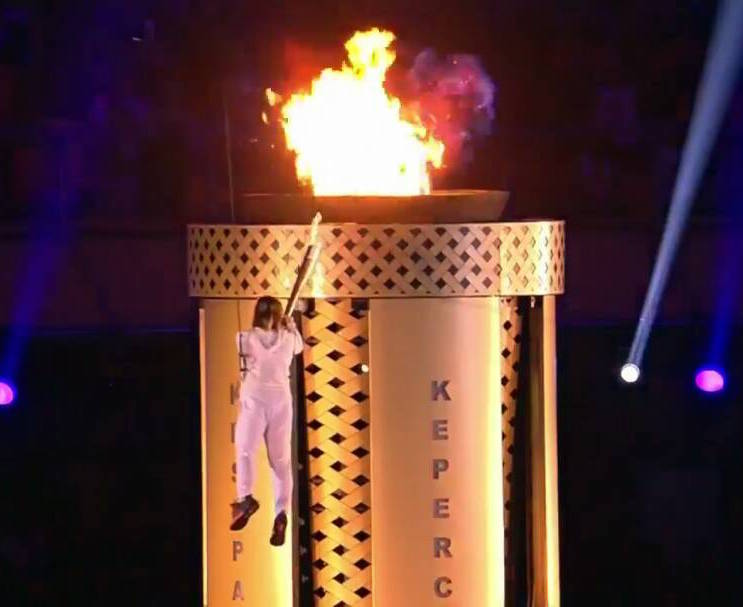
Dhabitah lighting up the cauldron to officiate the opening of the 2017 SEA Games in Kuala Lumpur

In June 2012, Dhabitah became the youngest Malaysian diver to win at a senior international competition by winning two events at the South-East Asia Swimming Championships in Singapore. At the 2013 SEA Games, Dhabitah won the gold medal in the 10 meter synchronised platform event with Leong Mun Yee.

At the 2014 Commonwealth Games in Glasgow, Dhabitah won the bronze medal in the 10 meter synchronised platform with Pandelela Rinong. She also finished sixth in the 3 meter synchronised springboard event with Ng Yan Yee and eleventh in the individual 3 meter springboard event.

At the 2015 SEA Games, Dhabitah and Ng Yan Yee won the gold medal in the 3 meter synchronised springboard. In September 2015, after winning the women's individual 10 meter platform event at the 2015 Asian Diving Cup, Dhabitah earned a slot to the 2016 Summer Olympics. In February 2016, Dhabitah and Cheong Jun Hoong earned an Olympic spot in the 3 meter synchronised springboard after finishing fifth at the Diving World Cup in Rio de Janeiro.

In her first event at the 2016 Summer Olympics, Dhabitah and Cheong Jun Hoong finished fifth in the 3 meter synchronized springboard. They were in the bronze medal position after the third dive but a mistake by Cheong Jun Hoong in the fourth dive cost Dhabitah her first Olympic medal. Dhabitah advanced to the final of the 10 meter platform event where she finished ninth with 338 points.

In April 2017, Dhabitah teamed up with Pandelela Rinong to bag a silver in 10 meter synchronised platform in Windsor, Canada. It was her first medal in the Diving World Series. At the 2017 World Aquatics Championships in Budapest, Dhabitah reached the final of 3 meter springboard individual where she finished 10th with 292.35 points.

Dhabitah was chosen to light the cauldron during the opening ceremony of the 2017 SEA Games in Kuala Lumpur. Dhabitah took silver in the 3 meter springboard individual event which was won by compatriot, Ng Yan Yee. Dhabitah would later partner with Ng Yan Yee to win gold in the 3 meter synchronised springboard. In October 2017, they were stripped of their gold medal after Ng Yan Yee failed a doping test.

At the 2018 Commonwealth Games, Dhabitah won a bronze medal with Leong Mun Yee in the 3 meter synchronised springboard. They won another bronze medal in 10 meter synchronised platform. At the 2018 Asian Games, the pair won bronze in the 10 meter synchronised platform. In her second event of the Games, she got a silver with Ng Yan Yee in the 3 metre synchronized springboard. In her third event, she missed out on the bronze medal after finishing in fourth place in the 1 metre springboard. In her last event, she won a bronze medal in the 3 metre springboard, finishing behind Shi Tingmao and Wang Han of China.

She competed at the 2022 Commonwealth Games where she won silver medals in the women's synchronised 3 metre springboard event alongside Ng Yan Yee and in the women's 3 metre springboard event, a bronze medal in the mixed synchronised 3 metre springboard event alongside Muhammad Syafiq Puteh and came 4th in the women's synchronised 10 metre platform alongside Pandelela Rinong.

From May to December, Dhabitah, along with Goh Sze Fei and Shahrul Saad were appointed as brand ambassadors for Nutrilite Malaysia.

== Competition history ==
=== Malaysia National Competition ===
Competition	2007	2008	2009	2010	2011	2012	2013	2014
Sukma Games		Bronze		Silver		Gold		Gold
MSSM (Malaysia Schools Sport Council)	Bronze	Bronze	Gold	Gold	Gold	Gold		
8TH NSC-MILO-ASUM Championship		Gold						
47TH National Age Group Championship					Gold			

=== International Competition ===
Competition	2012	2013	2014	2015	2016	2017	2018	2019	2021	2022
Olympic Games					5th				4th	
Commonwealth Games			Bronze				Bronze; Bronze			Silver; Silver; Bronze
Southeast Asia Games		Gold		Gold		Gold		Gold	Gold	
FINA Diving World Series				4th		Silver	5th	Bronze		
FINA Diving Grand Prix		14th	Gold; Bronze	Gold; Silver; Silver		Silver; Bronze		Gold		
FINA World Cup			7th		5th		6th		14th	
FINA World Championship				8th		6th		8th		
Asian Diving Cup		Gold		Gold						
Asian Games			6th				Silver; Bronze; Bronze			Silver; Bronze; 4th
Macau International Diving Invitational	Gold									
Southeast Asia Swimming Championship	Gold									

== Awards ==
Year	Award	Category	Result
2023	Harian Metro Sports Icon Awards (AISHM)	Gardenia Breakthru Women's Sports Icon Award	Won
2017	Sportswriters Association of Malaysia (SAM) -100 Plus	Malaysia Most Promising Athlete 2016	Won
2017	Federal Territories (FT)	Best Sportswoman	Won
2016	Anugerah Pelajar Cemerlang Yayasan Kuala Lumpur	Best Sport Achievement 2015 - Aquatics	Won
2015	Anugerah Sukan KPM MSSM-Milo	Best Female	Won
2015	Anugerah Sukan Wilayah Persekutuan Kuala Lumpur	Future Female Sport Athlete 2013/2014	Won
2015	Anugerah Sekolah Sukan Bukit Jalil	Best Female Sport Athlete	Won
2014	Majlis Anugerah Sukan Wilayah Persekutuan	Best Female of 2011/2012	Won
2011	Majlis Juara Juara MSSWP	Sports Achievement in MSSM	Won
2010	The 2ND Young Malaysian Outstanding Achievement	Sports	Won
2010	Majlis Anugerah Kecemerlangan Kokurikulum Peringkat Putrajaya	Best Primary School Athlete	Won

== Honours ==
- Federal Territory (Malaysia)
  - Member of the Order of the Territorial Crown (AMW) (2019)
