= Chew Yiwei =

Malaysian diver (born 1995)

Personal information
- Native name: 周贻尉
- Nationality: Malaysian
- Born: 16 October 1995 (age 30) Klang, Malaysia
- Height: 170 cm (5 ft 7 in)
- Weight: 63 kg (139 lb)

Sport
- Country: Malaysia
- Sport: Diving
- Coached by: Yang Zhuliang; Christian Brooker
- Retired: 17 April 2023
Medal record
Diving
Representing Malaysia
Asian Games
Bronze medal – third place	2014 Incheon	10 m synchro platform
Bronze medal – third place	2018 Jakarta-Palembang	3m springboard
Southeast Asian Games
Gold medal – first place	2015 Singapore	10 m synchro platform
Gold medal – first place	2017 Kuala Lumpur	3 m synchro springboard
Gold medal – first place	2019 Philippines	3 m synchro springboard
Gold medal – first place	2021 Hanoi	3 m synchro springboard
Bronze medal – third place	2013 Naypyidaw	3 m springboard

Chew Yiwei (born 16 October 1995 in Selangor) is a Malaysian former diver. He competed at the Commonwealth Games in 2014 and 2018, the Asian Games in 2014 and 2018, and the Southeast Asian Games in 2013, 2015, 2017, 2019 and 2021.

== Retirement ==
Chew announced his resignation from the national diving team and retirement from competitive diving on 17 April 2023 to focus on his studies, where he is in the final year of Computer Science course.
