= Myra Lee (diver) =

Singaporean diver

Myra Lee Jia Wen
Personal information
- Born: Singapore

Sport
- Country: Singapore
- Event(s): 3 m Springboard, 10 m Synchronised Platform
Medal record
Diving
Representing Singapore
Southeast Asian Games
| Silver medal – second place | 2015 Southeast Asian Games | 10 m synchro platform |
| Bronze medal – third place | 2013 Southeast Asian Games | 3 m synchro springboard |
- Updated on 18 June 2015

Myra Lee Jia Wen is a Singaporean diver.

In 2010, Myra participated in the 2010 Summer Youth Olympics in Singapore. She managed to overcome a back injury she suffered during the preliminary round of the Girls' 10m platform and competed in the finals. However, the injury affected her performance and she finished last.

In 2013, Myra took part in the 2013 Southeast Asian Games along with her partner Fong Kay Yian in the Women's synchronized 3 m springboard event in which the duo won the bronze medal.

A year later, she competed in the 2014 Asian Games Women's 1 metre springboard and Women's 3 metre springboard. She also took part in the Women's synchronized 3 metre springboard with Fong Kay Yian.

At the 2015 Southeast Asian Games, she won a silver medal in the Women's synchronized 10 m platform event with her partner Freida Lim Shen-Yan.
