= Ooi Tze Liang =

Malaysian diver

Personal information
- Born: 19 November 1993 (age 32) Penang, Malaysia
- Height: 170 cm (5 ft 7 in)
- Weight: 68 kg (150 lb)

Sport
- Country: Malaysia
- Sport: Diving
Medal record
Diving
Representing Malaysia
Asian Games
| Silver medal – second place | 2010 Guangzhou | 10 m synchro platform |
| Silver medal – second place | 2014 Incheon | 3 m synchro springboard |
| Bronze medal – third place | 2014 Incheon | 10 m synchro platform |
| Bronze medal – third place | 2022 Hangzhou | 3 m synchro springboard |
Commonwealth Games
| Gold medal – first place | 2014 Glasgow | 3 m springboard |
| Silver medal – second place | 2014 Glasgow | 10 m platform |
Southeast Asian Games
| Gold medal – first place | 2013 Naypyidaw | 3 m springboard |
| Gold medal – first place | 2013 Naypyidaw | 3 m synchro springboard |
| Gold medal – first place | 2013 Naypyidaw | 10 m synchro platform |
| Gold medal – first place | 2015 Singapore | 3 m springboard |
| Gold medal – first place | 2015 Singapore | 3 m synchro springboard |
| Gold medal – first place | 2015 Singapore | 10 m platform |
| Gold medal – first place | 2017 Kuala Lumpur | 3 m springboard |
| Gold medal – first place | 2017 Kuala Lumpur | 10 m platform |
| Gold medal – first place | 2019 Philippines | 3 m springboard |
| Gold medal – first place | 2019 Philippines | 3 m synchro springboard |
| Gold medal – first place | 2021 Hanoi | 3 m synchro springboard |
| Gold medal – first place | 2021 Hanoi | 1 m springboard |
| Silver medal – second place | 2011 Palembang | 10 m platform |
| Silver medal – second place | 2013 Naypyidaw | 10 m platform |
| Silver medal – second place | 2017 Kuala Lumpur | 1 m springboard |

Ooi Tze Liang

Chinese name
- Simplified Chinese: 黄兹樑
- Hanyu Pinyin: Huáng Zī Liáng

Ooi Tze Liang (Chinese: 黄兹樑; pinyin: Huáng Zī Liáng, born 19 November 1993 in Penang) is a Malaysian diver. Ooi has represented Malaysia in various diving events such as 2014 Glasgow Commonwealth Games, 2013 Southeast Asian Games and 2015 Southeast Asian Games.

== Early and personal life ==
Tze Liang (who also goes by David) was born in Penang and started diving at the age of eight. He is currently studying at University of Malaya. He enjoys playing Lego and watching YouTube videos.

== Career ==
At the 2014 Glasgow Commonwealth Games, Ooi became the first Malaysian male to win a Commonwealth gold medal in diving when he won the men's 3 metre springboard event. He also took the silver medal in the men's 10 metre platform event. He finished second to Tom Daley of England.

After winning the gold medal for men's 3 meter springboard event at the 6th Asian Diving Cup, Ooi became the third diver (after Pandelela Rinong and Wendy Ng) to qualify for the 2016 Summer Olympics.

He competed at the 2022 Commonwealth Games where he came 7th in the Men's 3 metre springboard event.

== Awards and recognition ==
Ooi was awarded Olympic Council of Malaysia (OCM)-Sports Toto Award for outstanding performance at the 2015 Singapore Sea Games. .
