= Bowling at the 2019 SEA Games =

- Venue: Coronado Lanes, Starmall EDSA-Shaw
- Location: Mandaluyong, Philippines
- Dates: 3–8 December
- Nations: 8

The bowling competitions at the 2019 SEA Games in the Philippines was held from 3 to 8 December 2019 at Coronado Lanes within Starmall EDSA-Shaw in Mandaluyong, Metro Manila.

== Events ==
The following events will be contested:

- Singles
- Doubles
- Mixed doubles
- Team of 4
- Masters

== Participating nations ==
- Philippines (8)
- Malaysia (8)
- Singapore (8)
- Vietnam (6)
- Thailand (7)
- Indonesia (8)
- Brunei (8)
- Myanmar (4)

== Medal table ==
* Host nation (Philippines)

Rank	Nation	Gold	Silver	Bronze	Total
1	Indonesia	4	2	1	7
2	Singapore	3	1	4	8
3	Malaysia	2	3	2	7
4	Thailand	0	2	1	3
5	Philippines*	0	1	1	2
Totals (5 entries)		9	9	9	27

== Medalists ==
=== Men ===
Event	Gold	Silver	Bronze
Singles	Tan Chye Chern; Malaysia	Annop Arromsaranon; Thailand	Cheah Ray Han; Singapore
Doubles	Indonesia; Billy Muhammad Islam; Hardy Rachmadian	Thailand; Atchariya Cheng; Surasak Manuwong	Malaysia; Tun Hakim; Rafiq Ismail
Team of 4	Malaysia; Rafiq Ismail; Tun Hakim; Tan Chye Chern; Ahmad Muaz	Philippines; Kenneth Chua; Patrick Nuqui; Frederick Ong; Merwin Tan	Thailand; Atchariya Cheng; Surasak Manuwong; Annop Arromsaranon; Yannaphon Larpapharat
Masters	Billy Muhammad Islam; Indonesia	Ryan Leonard Lalisang; Indonesia	Muhd Jaris Goh; Singapore

=== Women ===
Event	Gold	Silver	Bronze
Singles	New Hui Fen; Singapore	Tannya Roumimper; Indonesia	Shayna Ng; Singapore
Doubles	Indonesia; Sharon Limansantoso; Tannya Roumimper	Singapore; New Hui Fen; Shayna Ng	Malaysia; Jane Sin; Esther Cheah
Team of 4	Singapore; Daphne Tan; New Hui Fen; Shayna Ng; Cherie Tan	Malaysia; Esther Cheah; Jane Sin; Shalin Zulkifli; Siti Safiyah	Philippines; Marie Alexis Sy; Liza Del Rosario; Lara Posadas-Wong; Bea Hernandez
Masters	New Hui Fen; Singapore	Siti Safiyah; Malaysia	Shayna Ng; Singapore

=== Mixed ===
Event	Gold	Silver	Bronze
Doubles	Indonesia; Ryan Leonard Lalisang; Aldila Indryati	Malaysia; Ahmad Muaz; Siti Safiyah	Indonesia; Hardy Rachmadian; Sharon Limansantoso
