= Ng Yan Yee =

Malaysian diver

Personal information
- Full name: Ng Yan Yee
- Born: 11 July 1993 (age 32) Kuala Lumpur, Malaysia
- Height: 1.55 m (5 ft 1 in)
- Weight: 50 kg (110 lb)

Sport
- Country: Malaysia
- Event(s): 10 m, 10 m sync, 3 m
- Partner: Cheong Jun Hoong
- Coached by: Yang Zhou Liang
Medal record
Representing Malaysia
Diving
Commonwealth Games
| Silver medal – second place | 2022 Birmingham | 3 m synchro springboard |
Asian Games
| Silver medal – second place | 2022 Hangzhou | 3 m synchro springboard |
| Silver medal – second place | 2018 Jakarta-Palembang | 3 m synchro springboard |
| Silver medal – second place | 2014 Incheon | 3 m synchro springboard |
| Silver medal – second place | 2010 Guangzhou | 3 m synchro springboard |
Southeast Asian Games
| Gold medal – first place | 2011 Palembang | 3 m synchro springboard |
| Gold medal – first place | 2013 Naypyidaw | 3 m synchro springboard |
| Gold medal – first place | 2015 Singapore | 3 m synchro springboard |
| Gold medal – first place | 2019 Philippines | 3 m springboard |
| Gold medal – first place | 2019 Philippines | 3 m synchro springboard |
| Gold medal – first place | 2021 Hanoi | 3 m springboard |
| Gold medal – first place | 2021 Hanoi | 3 m synchro springboard |
| Silver medal – second place | 2011 Palembang | 3 m springboard |
| Silver medal – second place | 2013 Naypyidaw | 3 m springboard |
| Silver medal – second place | 2015 Singapore | 3 m springboard |
- Updated on 9 May 2022

Wendy Ng Yan Yee (born 11 July 1993) is a Malaysian diver.

== Career ==
=== Early beginning ===
Ng begin diving at the age of 13 at Bandar Tun Razak Swimming Pool. She was a rhythmic gymnast but her talent was spotted by the national coach, Yang Zhuliang due to her "physical build was good for diving".

=== 2012 Summer Olympics ===
She competed 3 m springboard at the 2012 Summer Olympics.

=== 2016 Summer Olympics ===
Ng finished 11th in 3 metre springboard at the 2015 World Aquatics Championships in Kazan, Russia and qualify for the 2016 Summer Olympics.

Ng went through the 3 metre springboard preliminary round at a ranking of 17, finishes 5th place at the semifinals and lastly ranking at 10th place for the finals.

=== 2017 Southeast Asian Games ===
In diving at the 2017 Southeast Asian Games, Ng came in first place in the mixed 3 metre springboard synchro, but was stripped of the gold medal after testing positive for sibutramine. The gold medal was subsequently awarded to fellow Malaysian divers Muhammad Syafiq Puteh and Jasmine Lai Pui Yee. Though not generally considered a performance-enhancing drug, sibutramine is listed in the World Anti-Doping Code as a banned substance. In March 2018, FINA announced that Ng would be suspended from the sport for eight months. As a result, she was unable to compete in diving at the 2018 Commonwealth Games.

In diving at the 2019 Southeast Asian Games, Ng won a gold medal in the women's individual 3 metre springboard event.

=== 2020 Summer Olympics ===
Ng competed in diving at the 2020 Summer Olympics in 2021 in Tokyo, Japan. In the women's 3m springboard, she finished 20th with a score of 251.95 points in the preliminaries, and so did not advance to the semifinals.

=== Later career ===
Ng announced her retirement from diving in April 2024.
