= Squash at the 2019 SEA Games – Team events =

Squash – Team event at the 2019 SEA Games
- Venue: Manila Polo Club, Makati
- Dates: 4–9 December

Team events for squash at the 2019 Southeast Asian Games were held in Manila Polo Club, Makati, Philippines from 4 to 9 December 2019.

== Schedule ==
All times are Philippine Standard Time (UTC+8).

Date	Time	Event	Round
Wed, 4 December	17:00	Mixed team	Round-robin
Thu, 5 December	17:00	Mixed team	Round-robin
Fri, 6 December	17:00	Mixed team	Round-robin
Sat, 7 December	09:00	Women's team	Round-robin
Sat, 7 December	11:00	Men's team	Round-robin
Sat, 7 December	16:00	Women's team	Round-robin
Sat, 7 December	18:00	Men's team	Round-robin
Sun, 8 December	09:00	Women's team	Round-robin
Sun, 8 December	11:00	Men's team	Round-robin
Sun, 8 December	16:00	Women's team	Round-robin
Sun, 8 December	18:00	Men's team	Round-robin
Tue, 9 December	15:00	Women's team	Round-robin
Tue, 9 December	17:00	Men's team	Round-robin

== Results ==
=== Men's team ===
Pos	Team	Pld	W	L	MF	MA	MD	GF	GA	GD	PF	PA	PD	Pts	Final Result
1	Malaysia	4	4	0	11	1	+10	33	6	+27	381	215	+166	8	Gold medal
2	Philippines	4	3	1	9	3	+6	28	13	+15	384	305	+79	6	Silver medal
3	Singapore	4	2	2	6	6	0	23	20	+3	376	325	+51	4	Bronze medal
4	Indonesia	4	1	3	4	8	−4	14	25	−11	295	358	−63	2	Bronze medal
5	Thailand	4	0	4	0	12	−12	2	36	−34	183	416	−233	0	

7 December	Singapore	3–0	Thailand

Aaron-Jun Liang	3–0	Natthakit Jivasuwan	11–4, 11–1, 11–2
Chua Man Tong	3–1	Louis Boonsinsukh	9–11, 11–4, 11–3, 11–4
Chua Man Chin	3–1	Poonsiri Phuwis	11–8, 9–11, 11–9, 11–6

7 December	Philippines	3–0	Indonesia

David William Pelino	3–1	Agung Wilant	11–6, 9–11, 11–4, 11–9
Reymark Begornia	3–0	Mohammad Faisal	11–2, 12–10, 11–8
Robert Garcia	3–1	Satria Laksana	6–11, 11–6, 11–6, 11–9

7 December	Singapore	2–1	Indonesia

Chua Man Chin	1–3	Agung Wilant	7–11, 11–13, 11–4, 9–11
Aaron-Jon Liang	3–0	Mohammad Faisal	11–1, 11–8, 11–6
Samuel Kang	3–0	Satria Laksana	11–3, 11–7, 11–7

7 December	Malaysia	3–0	Thailand

Ong Sai Hung	3–0	Louis Boonsinsukh	11–3, 11–6, 11–5
Ryan Pasqual	3–0	Prapangkorn Potiruk	11–2, 11–4, 11–1
Darren Rahul Pragasam	3–0	Natthakit Jivasuwan	11–2, 11–7, 11–3

8 December	Singapore	0–3	Malaysia

Aaron-Jon Liang	2–3	Ong Sai Hung	4–11, 11–7, 11–2, 6–11, 9–11
Chua Man Chin	0–3	Darren Rahul Pragasam	7–11, 2–11, 4–11
Samuel Kang	0–3	Addeen Idrakie	0–11, 0–11, 0–11

8 December	Philippines	3–0	Thailand

Christopher Buraga	3–0	Prapangkorn Potiruk	11–5, 11–8, 11–3
David William Pelino	3–0	Louis Boonsinsukh	11–5, 14–12, 11–4
Robert Garcia	3–0	Phuwis Poonsiri	11–1, 11–4, 11–5

8 December	Philippines	1–2	Malaysia

Reymark Begornia	0–3	Ong Sai Hung	7–11, 5–11, 6–11
David William Pelino	1–3	Darren Rahul Pragasam	12–14, 5–11, 11–6, 6–11
Robert Garcia	3–0	Addeen Idrakie	11–0, 11–0, 11–0

8 December	Indonesia	3–0	Thailand

Mohammad Faisal	3–0	Prapangkorn Potiruk	11–4, 11–1, 11–2
Agung Wilant	3–0	Louis Boonsinsukh	11–6, 11–7, 11–4
Satria Laksana	3–0	Phuwis Poonsiri	11–9, 11–5, 11–2

9 December	Singapore	1–2	Philippines

Samuel Kang	0–3	Robert Garcia	11–13, 8–11, 9–11
Chua Man Chin	2–3	David William Pelino	11–9, 11–5, 10–12, 3–11, 5–11
Aaron-Jon Liang	3–0	Reymark Begornia	11–0, 11–0, 11–0

9 December	Malaysia	3–0	Indonesia

Addeen Idrakie	3–0	Agung Wilant	11–8, 11–2, 11–3
Darren Rahul Pragasam	3–0	Mohammad Faisal	11–5, 11–9, 11–5
Ryan Pasqual	3–0	Rahmad Diyanto	11–6, 11–2, 11–3

=== Women's team ===
Pos	Team	Pld	W	L	MF	MA	MD	GF	GA	GD	PF	PA	PD	Pts	Final Result
1	Malaysia	4	4	0	12	0	+12	36	1	+35	406	152	+254	8	Gold medal
2	Singapore	4	2	2	6	6	0	21	20	+1	359	317	+42	4	Silver medal
3	Indonesia	4	2	2	6	6	0	19	21	−2	331	326	+5	4	Bronze medal
4	Philippines	4	2	2	5	7	−2	16	22	−6	265	344	−79	4	Bronze medal
5	Thailand	4	0	4	1	11	−10	5	33	−28	180	402	−222	0	

7 December	Malaysia	3–0	Thailand

Ooi Kah Yan	3–0	Tuddaw Thamronglarp	11–2, 11–4, 11–0
Yee Xin Ying	3–0	Pranghatai Phongrattana	11–1, 11–2, 11–3
Wen Li Lai	3–0	Anantana Prasertratanakul	11–3, 11–9, 11–2

7 December	Singapore	2–1	Indonesia

Sneha Sivakumar	3–0	Maudy Wafa Nadiyah	11–7, 11–9, 11–2
Sherilyn Yang	2–3	Nisa Nur Fadilah	11–5, 5–11, 11–8, 9–11, 9–11
Au Yeong Wai Yhann	3–0	Catur Yuliana	11–9, 11–4, 11–8

7 December	Malaysia	3–0	Indonesia

Ooi Kah Yan	3–0	Nisa Nur Fadilah	11–6, 11–3, 11–5
Yee Xin Ying	3–0	Yaisha Putri Yasandi	11–9, 11–5, 11–2
Rachel Arnold	3–0	Maudy Wafa Nadiyah	11–4, 11–7, 11–3

7 December	Philippines	2–1	Thailand

Yvonne Alissa Dalida	3–0	Tuddaw Thamronglarp	11–8, 11–4, 11–4
Jimmie Avilla	0–3	Pranghatai Phongrattana	7–11, 9–11, 6–11
Jemyca Aribado	3–0	Anantana Prasertratanakul	11–6, 11–7, 11–7

8 December	Malaysia	3–0	Philippines

Ooi Kah Yan	3–0	Jimmie Avilla	11–0, 11–2, 11–2
Wen Li Lai	3–0	Yvonne Alissa Dalida	11–8, 11–5, 11–6
Rachel Arnold	3–0	Jemyca Aribado	11–0, 11–0, 11–0

8 December	Singapore	3–0	Thailand

Yukino Tan	3–0	Nichanan Boonmark	11–3, 11–2, 11–2
Sneha Sivakumar	3–0	Pranghatai Phongrattana	11–0, 11–3, 11–1
Au Yeong Wai Yhann	3–2	Anantana Prasertratanakul	9–11, 11–7, 8–11, 11–4, 11–8

8 December	Singapore	1–2	Philippines

Sherilyn Yang Huixian	3–0	Jimmie Avilla	11–1, 11–1, 11–3
Sneha Sivakumar	0–3	Yvonne Alyssa Dalida	9–11, 9–11, 3–11
Au Yeong Wai Yhann	0–3	Jemyca Aribado	5–11, 8–11, 6–11

8 December	Indonesia	3–0	Thailand

Yaisha Putri Yasandi	3–0	Nichanan Boonmark	11–1, 11–3, 11–2
Maudy Wafa Nadiyah	3–0	Pranghatai Phongrattana	11–3, 11–5, 11–0
Catur Yuliana	3–0	Anantana Prasertratanakul	11–8, 11–8, 11–3

9 December	Malaysia	3–0	Singapore

Rachel Arnold	3–0	Sneha Sivakumar	11–5, 11–6, 11–3
Wen Li Lai	3–1	Sherilyn Yang Huixian	10–12, 11–6, 11–3, 11–4
Ooi Kah Yan	3–0	Yukino Tan	11–5, 11–7, 11–8

9 December	Philippines	1–2	Indonesia

Jemyca Aribado	3–1	Catur Yuliana	11–6, 11–8, 6–11, 11–5
Yvonne Alyssa Dalida	1–3	Maudy Wafa Nadiyah	9–11, 11–7, 8–11, 8–11
Jimmie Avilla	0–3	Nisa Nur Fadilah	4–11, 2–11, 2–11

=== Mixed team ===
Pos	Team	Pld	W	L	MF	MA	MD	GF	GA	GD	PF	PA	PD	Pts	Final Result
1	Philippines	3	3	0	9	0	+9	27	4	+23	319	212	+107	6	Gold medal
2	Singapore	3	2	1	6	3	+3	18	10	+8	253	179	+74	4	Silver medal
3	Indonesia	3	1	2	3	6	−3	12	20	−8	263	300	−37	2	Bronze medal
4	Thailand	3	0	3	0	9	−9	4	27	−23	178	322	−144	0	Bronze medal

4 December	Singapore	3–0	Indonesia

Au Yeong Wai Yhann	3–0	Catur Yuliana	11–8, 11–7, 11–4
Aaron-Jon Liang	3–0	Agung Wilant	12–10, 11–1, 11–0
Samuel Kang	3–1	Satria Laksana	9–11, 11–8, 11–4, 11–1

4 December	Philippines	3–0	Thailand

Jemyca Aribado	3–0	Anantana Prasertratanakul	11–6, 11–6, 11–5
Reymark Begornia	3–0	Natthakit Jivasuwan	11–7, 11–5, 11–4
David William Pelino	3–2	Poonsiri Phuwis	11–7, 7–11, 11–9, 1–11, 11–3

5 December	Singapore	3–0	Thailand

Timothy Leong	3–0	Chattaporn Juntanaying	11–3, 11–2, 11–5
Sneha Sivakumar	3–0	Tuddaw Thamronglarp	11–2, 11–1, 11–4
Samuel Kang	3–0	Natthakit Jivasuwan	11–1, 11–4, 11–4

5 December	Philippines	3–0	Indonesia

Reymark Begornia	3–0	Agung Wilant	11–9, 11–9, 11–5
Jemyca Aribado	3–0	Catur Yuliana	12–10, 11–7, 11–9
Robert Garcia	3–2	Satria Laksana	11–8, 5–11, 11–5, 8–11, 11–9

6 December	Singapore	0–3	Philippines

Au Yeong Wai Yhann	0–2	Jemyca Aribado	7–11, 7–11, 8–11
Samuel Kang	0–2	Robert Garcia	7–11, 7–11, 9–11
Aaron-Jon Liang	0–3	Reymark Begornia	0–11, 0–11, 0–11

6 December	Indonesia	3–0	Thailand

Catur Yuliana	3–0	Anantana Prasertratanakul	12–10, 11–5, 11–8
Satria Laksana	3–2	Poonsiri Phuwis	9–11, 11–3, 7–11, 11–3, 11–5
Agung Wilant	3–0	Natthakit Jivasuwan	11–6, 11–7, 11–9
