= Squash at the 2019 SEA Games – Individual events =

Squash – Individual event at the 2019 SEA Games
- Venue: Manila Polo Club, Makati
- Dates: 1–3 December

Individual event for squash at the 2019 Southeast Asian Games was held in Manila Polo Club, Makati, Philippines from 1 to 3 December 2019.

== Schedule ==
Date	Time	Round
Sunday, 1 December	10:00	First Round
Sunday, 1 December	17:00	Quarterfinals
Monday, 2 December	17:00	Semifinals
Tuesday, 3 December	17:00	Finals

== Results ==
=== Men's singles ===
First Round
Natthakit Jivasuwan (THA)	9	7	8
Satria Laksana (INA)	11	11	11
Poonsiri Phuwis (THA)	11	10	12	11
Arista Prima (INA)	1	12	10	6

Quarterfinals
Addeen Idrakie (MAS)	11	11	11
Satria Laksana (INA)	3	9	5
Reymark Begornia (PHI)	4	12	6	8
Chua Man Chin (SGP)	11	10	11	11
Samuel Kang (SGP)	5	10	8
Robert Garcia (PHI)	11	12	11
Poonsiri Phuwis (THA)	5	6	5
Darren Pragasam (MAS)	11	11	11

Semifinals
Addeen Idrakie (MAS)	11	11	11
Chua Man Chin (SGP)	3	3	2
Robert Garcia (PHI)	11	8	9	11	11
Darren Pragasam (MAS)	5	11	11	3	5

Final
Addeen Idrakie (MAS)	11	3	11	11
Robert Garcia (PHI)	7	11	9	5

=== Women's singles ===
First Round
Tuddaw Thamronglarp (THA)	3	2	5
Anantana Prasertratanakul (THA)	11	11	11
Sneha Sivakumar (SGP)	11	7	11	3^{r}
Nisa Nur Fadillah (INA)	3	11	6	6

Quarterfinals
Rachel Arnold (MAS)	11	11	11
Anantana Prasertratanakul (THA)	6	5	1
Yvonne Alissa Dalida (PHI)	1	13	7
Wai Yhann Au Yeong (SGP)	11	15	11
Chan Yiwen (MAS)	11	11	11
Catur Yuliana (INA)	3	0	7
Nisa Nur Fadillah (INA)	9	3	2
Jemyca Aribado (PHI)	11	11	11

Semifinals
Rachel Arnold (MAS)	11	11	11
Wai Yhann Au Yeong (SGP)	6	3	8
Chan Yiwen (MAS)	11	11	13
Jemyca Aribado (PHI)	6	7	11

Final
Rachel Arnold (MAS)	11	11	11
Chan Yiwen (MAS)	9	7	3
