= Malaysian Squash Tour =

Details
- Event name: several
- Location: Malaysia

Men's PSA World Tour
- Category: World Tour PSA 5 and PSA 10
- Prize money: $10,000 and $5,000

The Malaysian Squash Tour comprises several yearly professional squash PSA tournaments.

== Results ==
These are the results from 2018 onwards:

=== 2018 ===
| Tournament | Date | Champion | Runner-Up | Semifinalists | Quarterfinalists |
|---|---|---|---|---|---|
| Malaysian Squash Tour I 2018 Men; PSA 5 $5,000 | 16–19 January | (Pakistan) Asim Khan; 11–4, 11–4, 7–11, 11–5 | (Pakistan) Syed Ali Mujtaba Bokhari | (Malaysia) Muhammad Hannan (India) Abhay Singh | (Malaysia) Darren Rahul Pragasam (Malaysia) Addeen Idrakie (France) Geoffrey Demont (India) Guhan Senthilkumar |
| Malaysian Squash Tour I 2018 Women; PSA 5 $5,000 | 16–19 January | (France) Énora Villard; 11–9, 11–3, 7–11, 13–11 | (India) Sunayna Kuruvilla | (Malaysia) Aika Azman (Malaysia) Nazihah Hanis | (Malaysia) Wen Li Lai (Malaysia) Ooi Kah Yan (Wales) Ali Hemingway (Philippines) Jemyca Aribado |
| Malaysian Squash Tour II; 2018 Men; PSA 5 $5,000 | 24–27 January | (Pakistan) Asim Khan; 11–4, 9–11, 9–11, 11–4, 11–5 | (Malaysia) Mohd Syafiq Kamal | (Qatar) Syed Azlan Amjad (Malaysia) Darren Rahul Pragasam | (Pakistan) Zahir Shah (Pakistan) Syed Ali Mujtaba Bokhari (Malaysia) Ong Sai Hung (Malaysia) Valentino Bong |
| Malaysian Squash Tour II; 2018 Women; PSA 5 $5,000 | 24–27 January | (Malaysia) Aifa Azman; 11–6, 11–7, 11–9 | (Malaysia) Andrea Lee | (Philippines) Jemyca Aribado (Malaysia) Ma Si Yi | (Malaysia) Chan Yiwen (Malaysia) Aika Azman (Malaysia) Ooi Kah Yan (Czech Republic) Eva Ferteková |

== See also ==
- PSA World Tour
- WSA World Tour
