= Squash at the 2017 SEA Games =

- Venue: National Squash Centre
- Location: Kuala Lumpur, Malaysia
- Date: 21–29 August 2017

The squash competitions at the 2017 Southeast Asian Games in Kuala Lumpur took place at National Squash Centre.

== Medal table ==
* Host nation (Malaysia)

Rank	Nation	Gold	Silver	Bronze	Total
1	Malaysia (MAS)*	6	4	2	12
2	Singapore (SGP)	3	2	5	10
3	Philippines (PHI)	0	2	6	8
4	Indonesia (INA)	0	1	3	4
5	Thailand (THA)	0	0	2	2
Totals (5 entries)		9	9	18	36

== Medalists ==
Event	Gold	Silver	Bronze
Men's singles	Ng Eain Yow; Malaysia	Mohd Syafiq Kamal; Malaysia	Robert Andrew Garcia; Philippines
Men's singles	Ng Eain Yow; Malaysia	Mohd Syafiq Kamal; Malaysia	Samuel Kang Shan Mu; Singapore
Women's singles	Sivasangari Subramaniam; Malaysia	Rachel Arnold; Malaysia	Jemyca Aribado; Philippines
Women's singles	Sivasangari Subramaniam; Malaysia	Rachel Arnold; Malaysia	Sneha Sivakumar; Singapore
Men's doubles	Malaysia (MAS); Ng Eain Yow; Mohd Syafiq Kamal	Singapore (SGP); Timothy Leong Yew Sing; Pang Ka Hoe	Malaysia (MAS); Mohd Farez Izwan Mukhtar; Ong Sai Hung
Men's doubles	Malaysia (MAS); Ng Eain Yow; Mohd Syafiq Kamal	Singapore (SGP); Timothy Leong Yew Sing; Pang Ka Hoe	Singapore (SGP); Benedict Chan Jia Wei; Chua Man Tong
Women's doubles	Malaysia (MAS); Rachel Arnold; Andrea Lee Jia Qi	Malaysia (MAS); Chan Yiwen; Nazihah Hanis	Philippines (PHI); Jemyca Aribado; Yvonne Alyssa Dalida
Women's doubles	Malaysia (MAS); Rachel Arnold; Andrea Lee Jia Qi	Malaysia (MAS); Chan Yiwen; Nazihah Hanis	Singapore (SGP); Yhann Au Yeong Wai; Sneha Sivakumar
Mixed doubles	Malaysia (MAS); Sanjay Singh Chal; Sivasangari Subramaniam	Malaysia (MAS); Ryan Neville Pasqual; Andrea Lee Jia Qi	Philippines (PHI); Robert Andrew Garcia; Jemyca Aribado
Mixed doubles	Malaysia (MAS); Sanjay Singh Chal; Sivasangari Subramaniam	Malaysia (MAS); Ryan Neville Pasqual; Andrea Lee Jia Qi	Singapore (SGP); Pang Ka Hoe; Mao Shihui
Men's jumbo doubles	Singapore (SGP); Samuel Kang Shan Mu; Vivian Rhamanan	Indonesia (INA); Ade Furkon; Agung Wilant	Philippines (PHI); David William Pellino; Robert Andrew Garcia
Men's jumbo doubles	Singapore (SGP); Samuel Kang Shan Mu; Vivian Rhamanan	Indonesia (INA); Ade Furkon; Agung Wilant	Thailand (THA); Natthakit Jivasuwan; Phuwis Poonsiri
Women's jumbo doubles	Singapore (SGP); Mao Shihui; Sherilyn Yang Huixian	Philippines (PHI); Jemyca Aribado; Yvonne Alyssa Dalida	Thailand (THA); Anantana Prasertratanakul; Tuddaw Thamronglarp
Women's jumbo doubles	Singapore (SGP); Mao Shihui; Sherilyn Yang Huixian	Philippines (PHI); Jemyca Aribado; Yvonne Alyssa Dalida	Indonesia (INA); Catur Yuliana; Irma Maryani
Men's team	Singapore (SGP); Pang Ka Hoe; Benedict Chan Jia Wei; Samuel Kang Shan Mu; Vivian Rhamanan	Philippines (PHI); Reymark Begornia; Robert Andrew Garcia; David William Pellino; Juan Rafael Yam	Indonesia (INA); Ade Furkon; Agung Wilant; Eris Setiawan; Syauma Siswa Utama
Men's team	Singapore (SGP); Pang Ka Hoe; Benedict Chan Jia Wei; Samuel Kang Shan Mu; Vivian Rhamanan	Philippines (PHI); Reymark Begornia; Robert Andrew Garcia; David William Pellino; Juan Rafael Yam	Malaysia (MAS); Addeen Idrakie; Darren Rahul Pragasam; Mohd Syafiq Kamal; Ng Eain Yow
Women's team	Malaysia (MAS); Aifa Azman; Andrea Lee Jia Qi; Lai Wen Li; Ooi Kah Yan	Singapore (SGP); Yhann Au Yeong Wai; Pamela Chua Ying Li; Mao Shihui; Sneha Sivakumar	Indonesia (INA); Catur Yuliana; Irma Maryani; Rinduri Maulida Arnasty; Yaisha Putri Yasandi
Women's team	Malaysia (MAS); Aifa Azman; Andrea Lee Jia Qi; Lai Wen Li; Ooi Kah Yan	Singapore (SGP); Yhann Au Yeong Wai; Pamela Chua Ying Li; Mao Shihui; Sneha Sivakumar	Philippines (PHI); Isabelle Gotuaco; Jemyca Aribado; Joan Arebado; Yvonne Alyssa Dalida
