= Gymnastics at the 2019 SEA Games – Women's uneven bars =

Gymnastics – Women's uneven bars at the 2019 SEA Games
- Venue: Rizal Memorial Coliseum
- Date: 2 – 3 December 2019
- Competitors: 13 from 5 nations

Medalists
| gold medal | Farah Ann Abdul Hadi (MAS) |
| silver medal | Đỗ Thị Ngọc Hương (VIE) |
| bronze medal | Rachel Yeoh Li Wen (MAS) |

The women's uneven bars competition for gymnastics artistic at the 2019 SEA Games in Philippines was held from 2 to 3 December 2019 at Rizal Memorial Coliseum.

== Schedule ==
All times are Philippine Standard Time (UTC+8).

| Date | Time | Round |
|---|---|---|
| Monday, 2 December | 14:00 | Qualification |
| Tuesday, 3 December | 18:00 | Final |

== Results ==
=== Final ===
| Rank | Name | Difficulty | Execution | Penalty | Total |
|---|---|---|---|---|---|
| 1st place, gold medalist(s) | Farah Ann Abdul Hadi (MAS) | 5.100 | 7.267 | | 12.367 |
| 2nd place, silver medalist(s) | Đỗ Thị Ngọc Hương (VIE) | 4.100 | 7.667 | | 11.767 |
| 3rd place, bronze medalist(s) | Rachel Yeoh Li Wen (MAS) | 4.500 | 7.267 | | 11.767 |
| 4 | Trithalia (INA) | 4.000 | 6.800 | | 10.800 |
| 5 | Rifda Irfanaluthfi (INA) | 3.500 | 7.167 | | 10.667 |
| 6 | Trần Đoàn Quỳnh Nam (VIE) | 4.500 | 6.000 | | 10.500 |
| 7 | Tarrah Prayoonsuk (THA) | 4.100 | 3.100 | | 7.200 |
| 8 | Chloe Shaine Gatlabayan (PHI) | 3.300 | 2.800 | | 6.100 |
