= Malaysia at the 2019 SEA Games =

Malaysia at the 2019 Southeast Asian Games
- IOC code: MAS
- NOC: Olympic Council of Malaysia
- Website: www.olympic.org.my (in English)

in the Philippines
- Competitors: 773 in 52 sports
- Flag bearer: Rafiq Ismail (bowling)
- Officials: 339
- Medals Ranked 5th: Gold 56 Silver 57 Bronze 71 Total 184

Southeast Asian Games appearances (overview)
- 1959; 1961; 1965; 1967; 1969; 1971; 1973; 1975; 1977; 1979; 1981; 1983; 1985; 1987; 1989; 1991; 1993; 1995; 1997; 1999; 2001; 2003; 2005; 2007; 2009; 2011; 2013; 2015; 2017; 2019; 2021; 2023; 2025; 2027; 2029

Malaysia participated in the 2019 Southeast Asian Games from 30 November to 11 December 2019. The Malaysian contingent consist of 773 athletes, competing in 52 out 56 sports.

== Medal summary ==
=== Medal by sport ===
Medals by sport
Sport	1st place, gold medalist(s)	2nd place, silver medalist(s)	3rd place, bronze medalist(s)	Total
Aquatic diving	4	2	0	6
Aquatic swimming	2	2	3	7
Archery	1	2	1	4
Athletics	5	9	7	21
Badminton	3	2	5	10
Basketball	0	0	1	1
Billiards and snooker	1	1	0	2
Bowling	2	3	2	7
Boxing	0	0	3	3
Chess	1	0	0	1
Cycling	0	0	1	1
Dancesport	1	0	0	1
Duathlon	0	0	0	0
Esports	1	0	1	2
Figure skating	1	0	0	1
Fencing	0	2	1	3
Floorball	0	0	2	2
Football	0	0	0	0
Golf	0	1	0	1
Gymnastics	9	3	4	16
Beach handball	0	0	0	0
Ice hockey	0	0	0	0
Indoor hockey	2	0	0	2
Judo	0	2	0	2
Ju-jitsu	0	1	2	3
Karate	4	4	0	8
Kickboxing	0	2	1	3
Kurash	0	1	0	1
Lawn bowls	4	0	2	6
Modern pentathlon	0	0	0	0
Muaythai	1	2	2	5
Netball	1	0	0	1
Obstacle racing	0	3	1	4
Pencak silat	2	0	2	4
Pétanque	1	1	2	4
Polo	1	1	0	2
Rowing	0	0	0	0
Rugby sevens	0	1	1	2
Sailing	0	1	5	6
Sambo	0	1	0	1
Sepak takraw	0	2	1	3
Shooting	0	2	4	6
Short track speed skating	1	1	2	4
Skateboarding	1	0	1	2
Soft tennis	0	0	0	0
Softball	0	0	1	1
Squash	4	1	1	6
Surfing	0	0	0	0
Table tennis	0	0	2	2
Taekwondo	1	2	5	8
Tennis	0	0	0	0
Triathlon	0	0	0	0
Volleyball	0	0	0	0
Waterskiing	0	0	1	1
Weightlifting	0	0	2	2
Windsurfing	0	1	1	2
Wrestling	0	0	0	0
Wushu	2	1	1	4
Total	56	57	71	184

=== Medal by date ===
Medals by date
Day	Date	1st place, gold medalist(s)	2nd place, silver medalist(s)	3rd place, bronze medalist(s)	Total
1	1 December	4	2	2	8
2	2 December	7	0	6	13
3	3 December	7	3	6	16
4	4 December	3	7	8	18
5	5 December	2	5	2	9
6	6 December	5	3	5	13
7	7 December	8	8	13	29
8	8 December	5	14	13	32
9	9 December	11	9	12	32
10	10 December	4	6	4	13
11	11 December	0	0	0	0
Total		56	57	71	184

=== Medalists ===
Medal	Name	Sport	Event	Date
Gold	Loh Choon How	Wushu	Men's taijiquan	1 December
Gold	Sam Jee Lek	Dancesport	Men's breakdance	1 December
Gold	Amran Selamat; Tengku Ahmad Shazril Ezzani; Rashid Hasnan; Syed Ahmad Saipulrudin	Polo	4–6 high goal	1 December
Gold	Julian Yee	Figure skating	Men's singles	1 December
Gold	Loh Choon How	Wushu	Men's taijijian	2 December
Gold	Mohd Taqiyuddin Hamid; Yuga Sazlan	Pencak silat	Men's ganda	2 December
Gold	Afiqah Dayana Budiman; Nur Ain Nabilah Tarmizi; Syafiqa Haidar Afif; Siti Zalina Ahmad	Lawn bowls	Women's fours	2 December
Gold	Alyani Jamil; Emma Firyana Saroji	Lawn bowls	Women's pairs	2 December
Gold	An Najwa Azizan; Noor Azilah Aziz; Hasrin Nur Firra Syuhada; Izyan Syazana Mohd Wazir; Karishma S. Loganathan; Khairunnisa Nazri; Noramirah Dayana Noor Azhar; Norashikin Kamal Zaman; Nur Syafazliyana Mohd Ali; Nurfariha Abdul Razak; Pow Mei Foong; Siti Nor Farhana Mustafa	Netball	Women's team	2 December
Gold	Farah Ann Abdul Hadi	Gymnastics	Artistic – Women's all-around	2 December
Gold	Izzat Shameer Dzulkeple; Mohamad Fairus Abdul Jabal; Mohammad Syamil Syazwani Ramli	Lawn bowls	Men's triples	2 December
Gold	Rachel Arnold	Squash	Women's singles	3 December
Gold	Yeoh Li Tian	Chess	Men's rapid chess	3 December
Gold	Tan Chye Chern	Bowling	Men's singles	3 December
Gold	Tan Fu Jie	Gymnastics	Artistic – Men's pommel horse	3 December
Gold	Farah Ann Abdul Hadi	Gymnastics	Artistic – Women's uneven bars	3 December
Gold	Kynie Chan; Ashley Chin; Anja Chong; Dione Tan	Short track speed skating	Women's 3000m relay	3 December
Gold	Addeen Idrakie	Squash	Men's singles	3 December
Gold	Muhammad Idham Amin Ramlan; Zulhilmie Redzwan; Dahasry Daeng Dhadyry; Fairul Izwan Abdul Muin	Lawn bowls	Men's fours	4 December
Gold	Tracie Ang	Gymnastics	Artistic – Women's balance beam	4 December
Gold	Farah Ann Abdul Hadi	Gymnastics	Artistic – Women's floor exercise	4 December
Gold	Zulfazly Zulfakar	Pencak silat	Men's tanding Class D	5 December
Gold	Muhamad Hafizuddin Mat Daud; Syed Akmal Fikri Syed Ali; Saiful Bahri Musmin	Pétanque	Men's triples	5 December
Gold	Ng Yan Yee	Diving	Women's 3 metre springboard	6 December
Gold	Ooi Tze Liang; Chew Yiwei	Diving	Men's 3 metre springboard synchro	6 December
Gold	Moh Keen Hoo; Kok Leong Lim	Billiards and snooker	Men's snooker double	6 December
Gold	Rafiq Ismail; Tun Hakim; Tan Chye Chern; Ahmad Muaz	Bowling	Men's team of 4	6 December
Gold	Phee Jinq En	Swimming	Women's 50m breaststroke	6 December
Gold	Izzah Amzan	Gymnastics	Rhythmic – Ball	7 December
Gold	Koi Sie Yan	Gymnastics	Rhythmic – Ribbon	7 December
Gold	Izzah Amzan	Gymnastics	Rhythmic – Ribbon	7 December
Gold	Ooi Tze Liang	Diving	Men's 3m springboard	7 December
Gold	Prem Kumar Selvam	Karate	Men's kumite -55kg	7 December
Gold	Ng Yan Yee; Nur Dhabitah Sabri	Diving	Women's 3m springboard synchro	7 December
Gold	Chan Mei Thung; Eu Jia Xin; Koh Jei Yi; Lee Xin Yao; Lim Chyi Ean; Shak Yuki	Gymnastics	Rhythmic – Group all-around	7 December
Gold	Jason Loo Jun Wei; Nurul Hidayah Abdul Karim	Taekwondo	Mixed recognized poomsae	7 December
Gold	Madhuri Poovanesan	Karate	Women's kumite -55kg	8 December
Gold	Mohammad Masdor	Muaythai	Men's 45kg	8 December
Gold	Grace Wong	Skateboarding	Women's downhill	8 December
Gold	Haiqal Hanafi	Athletics	Men's 100m	8 December
Gold	Lee Hup Wei	Athletics	Men's high jump	8 December
Gold	Mohd Juwaidi Mazuki; Zulfadhli Ruslan; Khambeswaran Mohanaraja	Archery	Men's team compound	9 December
Gold	Dr. Yew Weng Kean	Esports	Hearthstone (PC)	9 December
Gold	Sharmendran Raghonathan	Karate	Men's kumite -75kg	9 December
Gold	Thompson Hoe; Ivan Oh Theng Wei; Emmanuel Leong Theng Kuang	Karate	Men's kata	9 December
Gold	Kisona Selvaduray	Badminton	Women's singles	9 December
Gold	Lee Zii Jia	Badminton	Men's singles	9 December
Gold	Rachel Arnold; Ooi Kah Yan; Wen Li Lai; Yee Xin Ying	Squash	Women's team	9 December
Gold	Aaron Chia; Soh Wooi Yik	Badminton	Men's doubles	9 December
Gold	Phee Jinq En	Swimming	Women's 100m breaststroke	9 December
Gold	Addeen Idrakie; Darren Rahul Pragasam; Ong Sai Hung; Ryan Pasqual	Squash	Men's team	9 December
Gold	Yap Sean Yee	Athletics	Women's high jump	9 December
Gold	Hakimi Ismail	Athletics	Men's triple jump	10 December
Gold	Juliani Mohamad Din; Farah Ayuni Yahya; Qasidah Najwa Muhammad Halimi; Noor Hasliza Md Ali; Ellya Syahirah Ellias; Nur Aisyah Yaacob; Siti Rozailah Syuhada Jilon; Iren Hussin; Nur Afiqah Syahzani Azhar; Raja Norshahrina Raja Shabbudin; Nuraini Abdul Rashid; Wan Norfaiezah Saiuti	Indoor hockey	Women's team	10 December
Gold	Irfan Shamsuddin	Athletics	Men's discus throw	10 December
Gold	Mohd Hanip Che Halim; Muhammad Najmi Farizal Jazlan; Muhammad Amirol Aideed Mohd Arshad; Mohd Khairul Afendy Kamaruzaman; Muhammad Aslam Mohamed Hanafiah; Rafizul Ezry Mustafa; Mohfaiz Hazrul Ahmad Sobri; Mohd Shafiq Yaacob; Muhammad Firdaus Omar; Shello Silverius; Muhamad Aminudin Mohd Zai; Shazril Irwan Nazli	Indoor hockey	Men's team	10 December
Silver	Wong Weng Son	Wushu	Men's changquan	1 December
Silver	Fakrul Adam Fauzi	Kurash	Men's 90kg	1 December
Silver	Chan Yiwen	Squash	Women's singles	3 December
Silver	Tan Ing Yueh	Gymnastics	Artistic – Women's vault	3 December
Silver	Dione Tan	Short track speed skating	Women's 500m	3 December
Silver	Mohd Redha Rozlan; Mohd Saddam Mohd Pittli; Yip Hui Theng; Tan Jie Yi	Obstacle racing	Team assist 400m	4 December
Silver	Mohd Redha Rozlan; Yoong Wei Theng; Salfarina Mohd Drus; Tan Jie Yi	Obstacle racing	Team relay 400m	4 December
Silver	Mohd Redha Rozlan	Obstacle racing	Men's 100m	4 December
Silver	Aidil Sholeh Ali Sadikin; Aaron Chia; Goh Soon Huat; Lee Zii Jia; Lim Chong King; Ong Yew Sin; Soh Wooi Yik; Soong Joo Ven; Tan Kian Meng; Teo Ee Yi	Badminton	Men's team	4 December
Silver	Hans Yoong	Fencing	Men's individual foil	4 December
Silver	Mohamad Ali Ismail; Hatem Ramijam	Muaythai	Men's waikru mai	4 December
Silver	Welson Sim	Swimming	Men's 400m freestyle	4 December
Silver	Nurashimah Senin; Nur Farah Hana Musa; Sufiqriyani Edie	Pétanque	Women's triples	5 December
Silver	Koh I Jie	Fencing	Men's individual épée	5 December
Silver	Ahmad Muaz; Siti Safiyah	Bowling	Mixed doubles	5 December
Silver	Izzat Afandi	Sambo	Men's combat 90kg	5 December
Silver	Nik Norlydiawati Nik Azman	Judo	Women's -63kg	5 December
Silver	Jasmine Lai Pui Yee	Diving	Women's 3 metre springboard	6 December
Silver	Muhammad Ruzaini Abdul Razak	Judo	Men's +100kg	6 December
Silver	Esther Cheah; Sin Li Jane; Shalin Zulkifli; Siti Safiyah	Bowling	Women's team of 4	6 December
Silver	Izzah Amzan	Gymnastics	Rhythmic – Hoop	7 December
Silver	Koi Sie Yan	Gymnastics	Rhythmic – Clubs	7 December
Silver	Muhd Syafiq Puteh	Diving	Men's 3m springboard	7 December
Silver	Ooi San Hong	Karate	Men's kata	7 December
Silver	Welson Sim	Swimming	Men's 200m freestyle	7 December
Silver	Jackie Wong	Athletics	Men's hammer throw	7 December
Silver	Andre Anura	Athletics	Men's long jump	7 December
Silver	Muhammad Fauzi Kaman Shah; Umar Al Farouk Mohd Zahawi	Sailing	Men's international 420 (U19)	7 December
Silver	Khairul Anuar Mohamad; Haziq Kamaruddin; Zarif Syahiir Zolkepeli	Archery	Men's team recurve	8 December
Silver	Said Ezwan Said De; Muhammad Hairul Hazizi Haidzir; Mohamad Azlan Alias; Muhammad Afifuddin Mohd Razali; Farhan Adam; Muhammad Syahmi Husin; Muhammad Zarif Marican Ibrahim Marican; Mohd Khairul Zaman Hamir Akhbar; Muhammad Hafizul Hayazi Adnan; Aidil Aiman Azwawi; Amirul Zazwan Amir; Ahmad Aizat Mohd Nor Azmi	Sepak takraw	Men's team regu	8 December
Silver	Mathivani Murugeesan	Karate	Women's kumite -61kg	8 December
Silver	Muhammad Arif Afifuddin Ab Malik	Karate	Men's kumite -67kg	8 December
Silver	Chang Sin Yi; Khaw Yee Voon; Celine Lee Xin Yi	Karate	Women's team kata	8 December
Silver	Siti Safiyah	Bowling	Women's masters	8 December
Silver	Ashley Lau; Natsha Onn	Golf	Women's team	8 December
Silver	Zulhilmi Rosli	Muaythai	Men's 48kg	8 December
Silver	Mohamad Nasharuddin Ismail; Wan Izzuddin Ismail; Muhammad Siddiq Amir Jalil; Anwarul Hafiz Ahmad; Muhammad Azwan Zuwairi Mat Zizi; Amalul Hazim Nasarrudin; Zulkiflee Azmi; Muhammad Zulhisham Rasli; Mohamad Sofian Mohd Kamil; Muhammad Ameer Nasrun Zulkeffli; Muhammad Dzafran Asyraaf Muhamad Zainudin; Muhamad Firdaus Tarmizi; Muhammad Azizul Hakim Che Oon	Rugby sevens	Men's team	8 December
Silver	Joshua Amirul Abdullah	Taekwondo	Men's welter -80kg	8 December
Silver	Norliyana Kamaruddin	Athletics	Women's heptathlon	8 December
Silver	Grace Wong	Athletics	Women's hammer throw	8 December
Silver	Muhammad Ziyad Zolkefli	Athletics	Men's shot put	8 December
Silver	Nauraj Singh Randhawa	Athletics	Men's high jump	8 December
Silver	Bibiana Ng	Shooting	Women's 10m air pistol	9 December
Silver	Rashid Hasnan; Mohd Zulhilmie Nadzar; Imran Khan Mohamed Muiz; Keith Teh	Polo	0–2 low goal	9 December
Silver	Goh Soon Huat; Shevon Jemie Lai	Badminton	Mixed doubles	9 December
Silver	Fatin Nurfatehah Mat Salleh	Archery	Women's individual compound	9 December
Silver	Illham Wahab	Windsurfing	Men's RS: One	9 December
Silver	Rayzam Shah Wan Sofian	Athletics	Men's 110m hurdles	9 December
Silver	Iman Hakim Rakib	Taekwondo	Men's bantam -63kg	9 December
Silver	Choo Kang Ni	Athletics	Women's discus throw	9 December
Silver	Nixson Anak Kennedy; Haiqal Hanafi; Khairul Hafiz Jantan; Russell Alexander Nasir Taib	Athletics	Men's 4×100m relay	9 December
Silver	Bernard Yeoh; Ong Chee; Chen Foo	Shooting	Men's trap team	10 December
Silver	Moh Keen Hoo	Billiards and snooker	Men's snooker singles	10 December
Silver	Cassandra J. Poyong	Ju-jitsu	Women's -55kg	10 December
Silver	Muhammad Hairul Hazizi Haidzir; Mohamad Azlan Alias; Muhammad Afifuddin Mohd Razali; Farhan Adam; Ahmad Aizat Mohd Nor Azmi	Sepak takraw	Men's regu	10 December
Silver	Awangku Awang Marajaya	Kickboxing	Men's -57kg full contact	10 December
Silver	Mohammed Mahmoud	Kickboxing	Men's -63.5kg low kick	10 December
Bronze	Cheah Pei Yi; Michaela Khoo; Nur Dianah Athirah Zulkefley; Chriyenterl Marcus; Giam Hui Ni; Nur Syafiqah Mohd Zain; Nurfarah Syahira Md Yusof; Angelica Anthony; Teja Ellesa Mohzeiswandi; Nur Anis Amyzaa Zakaria; Ivana Sonia Beriak; Cheng Kee; Janeter Kadir; Naomi Mair Selvanayagam; Norhafizah Razali; Kuek Jimun; P. Shanggamithara; Ling Ling Ang; Fathih Hasni Che Husain; Nur Suraya Ashikin	Floorball	Women's team	1 December
Bronze	Daniel Teoh; Adrian Koay; Indy Benjamin Toh; Lim Kai Sheng; Faris Maznan; Tristan James; Danial Mohd Azri; Zephaniah Chong; Fabian Chow; Zachary Choo; Benedict Yeoh; Chong Han Keong; Eugene Lai; Teh Chin Hong; Shukri Shamidi; Kang Jing Hong; Chiam Ter Min; Kao Lin Ken; Amirul Akmar Amir; Iman Nazirul	Floorball	Men's team	1 December
Bronze	Jantan Anak Hintu	Shooting	Men's WA 1500 PPC	2 December
Bronze	Aznil Bidin	Weightlifting	Men's 61kg	2 December
Bronze	Mohd Juned Abdullah; Nasrul Edzam Mohd Asri; Muhammad Syafiq Ibrahim	Pencak silat	Men's regu	2 December
Bronze	Muhammad Hizlee Abdul Rais; Soufi Rusli	Lawn bowls	Men's pairs	2 December
Bronze	Pang Hui Pin; Tan Chia Qian; Yap Fook Yee; Ting Chiau Teng	Basketball 3x3	Women's 3x3 team	2 December
Bronze	Tan Ing Yueh	Gymnastics	Artistic – Women's all-around	2 December
Bronze	Soniia Cheah Su Ya; Kisona Selvaduray; Lee Ying Ying; Eoon Qi Xuan; Chow Mei Kuan; Lee Meng Yean; Vivian Hoo Kah Mun; Yap Cheng Wen; Lai Pei Jing; Shevon Jemie Lai	Badminton	Women's team	3 December
Bronze	Teng Kai Wen	Wushu	Men's sanda 56kg	3 December
Bronze	Zul Bahrin Mat Asri	Gymnastics	Artistic – Men's floor exercise	3 December
Bronze	Rachel Yeoh Li Wen	Gymnastics	Artistic – Women's uneven bars	3 December
Bronze	Anja Chong	Short track speed skating	Women's 500m	3 December
Bronze	Darren Rahul Pragasam	Squash	Men's singles	3 December
Bronze	Auni Fathiah Kamis; Zuraini Khalid; Azlina Arshad	Lawn bowls	Women's triples	4 December
Bronze	Tun Hakim; Rafiq Ismail	Bowling	Men's doubles	4 December
Bronze	Yusliana Mohd Yusof	Shooting	Women's WA 1500 PPC	4 December
Bronze	Yusliana Mohd Yusof; Azeera Abdul Halim; Salzuriana Zubir	Shooting	Women's WA 1500 PPC team	4 December
Bronze	Muhammad Erry Hidayat	Weightlifting	Men's 73kg	4 December
Bronze	Sin Li Jane; Esther Cheah	Bowling	Women's doubles	4 December
Bronze	Dione Tan	Short track speed skating	Women's 1000m	4 December
Bronze	Welson Sim; Kiew Hoe Yean; Chahal Arvin Singh; Keith Lim	Swimming	Men's 4×200m freestyle relay	4 December
Bronze	Mohammad Khairi Adie Azhar	Pencak silat	Men's tanding Class A	5 December
Bronze	Phee Jinq En	Swimming	Women's 200m breaststroke	5 December
Bronze	Mohamad Muhaizar	Athletics	Men's marathon	6 December
Bronze	Mohd Saddam Mohd Pittli	Obstacle racing	Men's 5km	6 December
Bronze	Sharifah Aqilah Farhana Syed Ali; Siti Asiah Zaini	Pétanque	Women's doubles	6 December
Bronze	Mohamad Nuzul Azwan Ahmad Temizi; Mohd Firdaus Adli Mohd Bakri	Pétanque	Men's doubles	6 December
Bronze	Khiew Hoe Yean	Swimming	Men's 200m backstroke	6 December
Bronze	Amy Kwan	Gymnastics	Rhythmic – Hoop	7 December
Bronze	Javen Choong; Amos Ling Heng	Table tennis	Men's doubles	7 December
Bronze	Muhamad Ashraf Haiqal Muhamad Rizal; Wong Shen	Table tennis	Men's doubles	7 December
Bronze	Hans Yoong; Xin Han Cheng; Adam Tahir Mohamad Johan; Hydeer Akson	Fencing	Men's team foil	7 December
Bronze	Augustine Rudy Anak Grocer	Taekwondo	Men's recognized poomsae	7 December
Bronze	Augustine Rudy Anak Grocer; Jason Loo Jun Wei; Yong Jin Kun	Taekwondo	Men's team recognized poomsae	7 December
Bronze	Russell Alexander Nasir Taib	Athletics	Men's 200m	7 December
Bronze	Iskandar Alwi	Athletics	Men's pole vault	7 December
Bronze	Nor Nabila Natasha Mohd Nazri; Gabrielle Marygrace Yong Poquita	Sailing	Women's international 420 (U19)	7 December
Bronze	Khairulnizam Afendy	Sailing	Men's laser standard	7 December
Bronze	Nur Shazrin Mohd Latif	Sailing	Women's laser radial	7 December
Bronze	Mohamad Faizal Norizan; Ahmad Syukri Abdul Aziz	Sailing	Men's international 470	7 December
Bronze	Putera Adrine Danish Mohd Puad	Sailing	Men's optimist (U16)	7 December
Bronze	Elena Goh Ling Yin	Athletics	Women's 10km walk	8 December
Bronze	Nur Amisha Azrilrizal	Muaythai	Women's 54kg	8 December
Bronze	Riedzwan Daud	Muaythai	Men's 54kg	8 December
Bronze	Maisarah Ilham; Nurul Amira Farhana Mohd Yusaimi; Nur Syahirah Abu Hassan; Pavithraa Devi Jayaindraan; Ong Su Hui; Elsa Chew; Syarifah Aisyah Syed Ibrahim; Boo Lyann; Ong Hooi Fen; Nur Fateha Kassim; Tan Xin Rou; Lee Shu En; Nadia Chin Ishak; Haifa Chin Ishak; Ong Su Jun; Ngo Siew Ting	Softball	Women's team	8 December
Bronze	Khairul Anuar Mohamad; Nur Afisa Abdul Halil	Archery	Mixed team recurve	8 December
Bronze	Adam Yoong Hanifah; Nur Nadiah Md Nasir; Aaliyah Yoong Hanifah; Aiden Yoong Hanifah	Waterskiing	Cableski mixed team	8 December
Bronze	Rozliana Mohd Ridwan; Christina Edris; Emily Stephanie Chua Pui Yee; Euphrasia Anne Cralis; Nur Izzah Azizan; Nurul Azreen Azli; Fidelia Limang Telajan; Norfarahana Aziz; Siti Fatimah Mohamed Abdulla Inamulla; Amber Bernard; Cindy John Pasan; Shania Suinani Baduk	Rugby sevens	Women's team	8 December
Bronze	Luqman Hakimi Ahmad Shahrafidz	Skateboarding	Men's downhill	8 December
Bronze	Luqman Hakim Mohd Suhaimi	Taekwondo	Men's heavy +87kg	8 December
Bronze	Nur Aqilah Suhaimi	Taekwondo	Women's welter -67kg	8 December
Bronze	Muhammad Syafiq Zuber	Taekwondo	Men's light -74kg	8 December
Bronze	Azreen Nabila Alias; Jonathan Anak Nyepa; Zaidatul Husniah Zulkifli; Nixson Anak Kennedy	Athletics	Mixed 4×100m relay	8 December
Bronze	Ahmad Ali Huzaifi Abdullah; Abdul Wandi Abdul Kadir; Jamil Nurolla; Izme Haqeem Hamsjid; Muhammad Hazeem Onn	Esports	Mobile Legends: Bang Bang	8 December
Bronze	Ong Yew Sin; Teo Ee Yi	Badminton	Men's doubles	9 December
Bronze	Vivian Hoo Kah Mun; Yap Cheng Wen	Badminton	Women's doubles	9 December
Bronze	Chow Mei Kuan; Lee Meng Yean	Badminton	Women's doubles	9 December
Bronze	Tan Kian Meng; Lai Pei Jing	Badminton	Mixed doubles	9 December
Bronze	Ahmad Danish Abdul Hadi Kame	Windsurfing	Men's RS: X (9.5m)	9 December
Bronze	Adam Akasyah	Ju-jitsu	Men's -69kg	9 December
Bronze	Muhamad Fuad Mohd Redzuan	Boxing	Men's light flyweight	9 December
Bronze	Mohd Aswan Che Azmi	Boxing	Men's middleweight	9 December
Bronze	Khir Akyazlan Azmi	Boxing	Men's light heavyweight	9 December
Bronze	Kamisah Khamis; Siti Norzubaidah Che Ab Wahab; Siti Hadinavillah Jumidil; Razmah Anam	Sepak takraw	Women's regu	9 December
Bronze	Royson Vincent	Athletics	Men's 800m	9 December
Bronze	Queenie Ting Kung Ni	Athletics	Women's discus throw	9 December
Bronze	Ong Chee	Shooting	Men's trap	10 December
Bronze	Ai Jin Lee	Ju-jitsu	Women's -45kg	10 December
Bronze	Muhammad Iffat Mat Ripen	Kickboxing	Men's -60kg low kick	10 December
Bronze	Sheikh Muhammad Taslim Shaikh Mohd Raziff	Cycling	Men's BMX freestyle flatland	10 December
