= Gymnastics at the 2019 SEA Games – Women's artistic all-around =

Gymnastics – Women's artistic all around at the 2019 SEA Games
- Venue: Rizal Memorial Coliseum
- Date: 2 December 2019
- Competitors: 19 from 6 nations

Medalists
gold medal	Farah Ann Abdul Hadi (MAS)
silver medal	Rifda Irfanaluthfi (INA)
bronze medal	Tan Ing Yueh (MAS)

The women's all-around competition for gymnastics artistic at the 2019 SEA Games in Philippines was held on 2 December 2019 at Rizal Memorial Coliseum.

Farah Ann Abdul Hadi from Malaysia won the gold, followed by silver won by Rifda Irfanaluthfi from Indonesia and bronze won by Tan Ing Yueh from Malaysia.

== Results ==
Rank	Gymnast	Vault (gymnastics)	Uneven bars	Balance beam	Floor (gymnastics)	Total
1st place, gold medalist(s)	(Malaysia) Farah Ann Abdul Hadi	13.550	12.450	9.550	12.500	48.050
2nd place, silver medalist(s)	(Indonesia) Rifda Irfanaluthfi	13.250	11.300	11.150	12.100	47.800
3rd place, bronze medalist(s)	(Malaysia) Tan Ing Yueh	13.650	9.750	11.900	11.600	46.900
4	(Vietnam) Do Thi Van Anh	12.650	9.850	11.700	11.600	45.800
5	(Vietnam) Tran Doan Quynh Nam	12.350	10.100	8.650	11.150	42.250
6	(Philippines) Ma. Cristina Onofre	12.600	8.300	9.400	10.450	40.750
7	(Philippines) Mya Kalani Wilson	12.225	8.100	9.900	10.500	40.725
8	(Thailand) Tarrah Prayoonsuk	11.025	9.200	8.600	10.400	39.225
9	(Malaysia) Tracie Ang	12.850		12.550	13.000	38.400
10	(Singapore) Shayne Tan	12.050		12.050	9.200	33.300
11	(Indonesia) Amalia Nurun Nubuwah	12.450	8.200	7.950		28.600
12	(Indonesia) Yogi Rahmadhani	12.075			11.800	23.875
13	(Thailand) Crystal Watts	12.250			9.950	22.200
14	(Vietnam) Do Thi Ngoc Huong		11.300	10.700		22.000
15	(Indonesia) Trithalia		9.750	10.650		20.400
16	(Philippines) Mariana Josefa Hermoso			7.900	10.000	17.900
17	(Vietnam) Nguyen Thi Quynh Nhu	12.175				12.175
18	(Malaysia) Rachel Yeoh Li Wen		12.050			12.050
19	(Philippines) Chloe Shaine Gatbalayan		9.650			9.650
