= Izzah Amzan =

Malaysian rhythmic gymnast

- Full name: Izzah binti Amzan
- Born: 19 October 2000 (age 26) Mentakab, Pahang, Malaysia
- Height: 1.60 m (5.2 ft)

Gymnastics career
- Discipline: Rhythmic gymnastics
Medal record
Representing Malaysia
Women's Rhythmic gymnastics
Commonwealth Games
Silver medal – second place	2018 Gold Coast	Team
Bronze medal – third place	2022 Birmingham	Individual Clubs
Southeast Asian Games
Gold medal – first place	2019 Manila	Individual Ball
Gold medal – first place	2019 Manila	Individual Ribbon
Gold medal – first place	2017 Kuala Lumpur	Team
Gold medal – first place	2017 Kuala Lumpur	Individual Ball
Silver medal – second place	2019 Manila	Individual Hoop
Silver medal – second place	2017 Kuala Lumpur	Individual Clubs

Izzah Binti Amzan (born 19 October 2000) is a Malaysian rhythmic gymnast.

== Early life and background ==
Izzah was born in Mentakab, Pahang. She is the youngest of three siblings. She took up gymnastics at the age of five after her yoga instructor mother introduced her to the sport.

== Athletic career ==
Izzah made her international senior debut in 2016. She represented Malaysia at the 2017 Southeast Asian Games and at age 17 became one of Malaysia's youngest athletes to compete at the SEA Games. At the 2019 Southeast Asian Games, she won two gold medals and one silver. She was selected to represent Malaysia at the 2022 Commonwealth Games and won a bronze medal in the individual clubs event and finishing fourth in both the team all-around and individual all-around competitions.

== Awards and accolades ==
Year	Award	Category	Result	Ref(s)
2018	Minister of Education-Malaysian School Sports Council-Milo (MOE-MSSM-Milo) Sports Awards	Sportsgirl Award	Won	
2019	Minister of Education-Malaysian School Sports Council-Milo (MOE-MSSM-Milo) Sports Awards	Gold Sportsperson Award	Won	
