= Gymnastics at the 2019 SEA Games – Men's pommel horse =

Gymnastics – Men's pommel horse at the 2019 SEA Games
- Venue: Rizal Memorial Coliseum
- Date: 1 – 3 December 2019
- Competitors: 15 from 7 nations

Medalists
gold medal	Tan Fu Jie (MAS)
silver medal	Carlos Yulo (PHI)
bronze medal	Đinh Phương Thành (VIE)

The men's pommel horse competition for gymnastics artistic at the 2019 SEA Games in Philippines was held from 1 to 3 December 2019 at Rizal Memorial Coliseum.

== Schedule ==
All times are Philippine Standard Time (UTC+8).

Date	Time	Round
Sunday, 1 December	14:00	Qualification
Tuesday, 3 December	17:30	Final

== Results ==
=== Final ===
Rank	Name	Difficulty	Execution	Penalty	Total
1st place, gold medalist(s)	Tan Fu Jie (MAS)	5.700	8.267		13.967
2nd place, silver medalist(s)	Carlos Yulo (PHI)	4.900	8.333		13.233
3rd place, bronze medalist(s)	Đinh Phương Thành (VIE)	4.900	7.967		12.867
4	Jamorn Prommanee (THA)	5.400	7.400		12.800
5	Lê Thanh Tùng (VIE)	4.800	7.933		12.733
6	Jeremiah Loo Phay Xing (MAS)	5.500	7.100		12.600
7	Muhammad Saputra (INA)	4.700	7.433		12.133
8	Jan Gwynn Timbang (PHI)	4.500	6.200		10.700
