= Gymnastics at the 2019 SEA Games – Rhythmic group all-around =

Gymnastics – Rhythmic group all-around at the 2019 SEA Games
- Venue: Rizal Memorial Coliseum
- Date: 7 December 2019
- Competitors: 17 from 3 nations

The group all-around competition for rhythmic gymnastics at the 2019 SEA Games in Philippines was held on 7 December 2019 at Rizal Memorial Coliseum.

== Results ==
Rank	Team	5 Balls				3 Hoops + 2 Clubs				Total score
Rank	Team	Difficulty	Execution	Penalty	Total	Difficulty	Execution	Penalty	Total	Total score
1st place, gold medalist(s)	Malaysia (MAS); Chan Mei Thung; Eu Jia Xin; Koh Jei Yi; Lee Xin Yao; Lim Chyi Ean; Shak Yuki	16.700	5.950		22.650	13.100	4.300		17.400	40.050
2nd place, silver medalist(s)	Thailand (THA); Manatsanan Chaiteerapattarapong; Pornnutcha Jedthumrong; Pornchanit Junthabud; Chutikan Piwpong; Panjarat Prawatyotin; Puntita Thongsong	15.000	6.000		21.000	13.500	5.400		18.900	39.900
3rd place, bronze medalist(s)	Philippines (PHI); Jean Caluscusin; Andrea Mae Emperado; Katrina Loretizo; AJ Melyar; Devina Sembrano	12.300	4.850		17.150	8.600	4.000	-0.6	12.000	29.150
