= Gymnastics at the 2019 SEA Games – Men's floor =

Gymnastics – Men's floor at the 2019 SEA Games
- Venue: Rizal Memorial Coliseum
- Date: 1 – 3 December 2019
- Competitors: 16 from 7 nations

Medalists
gold medal	Carlos Yulo (PHI)
silver medal	Tikumporn Surintornta (THA)
bronze medal	Zul Bahrin Mat Asri (MAS)

The men's floor competition for gymnastics artistic at the 2019 SEA Games in Philippines was held from 1 to 3 December 2019 at Rizal Memorial Coliseum.

== Schedule ==
All times are Philippine Standard Time (UTC+8).

Date	Time	Round
Sunday, 1 December	14:00	Qualification
Tuesday, 3 December	16:00	Final

== Results ==
=== Final ===
Rank	Name	Difficulty	Execution	Penalty	Total
1st place, gold medalist(s)	Carlos Yulo (PHI)	6.200	8.500		14.700
2nd place, silver medalist(s)	Tikumporn Surintornta (THA)	5.600	8.233		13.833
3rd place, bronze medalist(s)	Zul Bahrin Mat Asri (MAS)	5.600	8.167		13.767
4	Jamorn Prommanee (THA)	5.200	8.267		13.467
5	Reyland Capellan (PHI)	5.700	7.733		13.433
6	Jeremiah Loo Phay Xing (MAS)	5.500	7.900		13.400
7	Muhammad Saputra (INA)	4.400	8.167		12.567
8	Đinh Phương Thành (VIE)	5.100	7.433		12.533
