= Gymnastics at the 2019 SEA Games – Women's balance beam =

Gymnastics – Women's balance beam at the 2019 SEA Games
- Venue: Rizal Memorial Coliseum
- Date: 2 – 4 December 2019
- Competitors: 14 from 5 nations

Medalists
gold medal	Tracie Ang (MAS)
silver medal	Rifda Irfanaluthfi (INA)
bronze medal	Đỗ Thị Vân Anh (VIE)

The women's balance beam competition for gymnastics artistic at the 2019 SEA Games in Philippines was held from 2 to 4 December 2019 at Rizal Memorial Coliseum.

== Schedule ==
All times are Philippine Standard Time (UTC+8).

Date	Time	Round
Monday, 2 December	14:00	Qualification
Wednesday, 4 December	16:30	Final

== Results ==
=== Final ===
Rank	Name	Difficulty	Execution	Penalty	Total
1st place, gold medalist(s)	Tracie Ang (MAS)	4.600	8.267		12.867
2nd place, silver medalist(s)	Rifda Irfanaluthfi (INA)	5.100	7.033		12.133
3rd place, bronze medalist(s)	Đỗ Thị Vân Anh (VIE)	4.900	5.467		10.367
4	Tan Ing Yueh (MAS)	4.700	5.500		10.200
5	Shayne Tan (SGP)	4.600	5.000		9.600
6	Đỗ Thị Ngọc Hương (VIE)	4.700	4.433		9.133
7	Mya Kalani Wilson (PHI)	4.100	5.000	-0.1	9.000
8	Trithalia (INA)	3.100	5.233		8.333
