= Gymnastics at the 2019 SEA Games – Clubs =

Gymnastics – Clubs at the 2019 SEA Games
- Venue: Rizal Memorial Coliseum
- Date: 6–7 December 2019
- Competitors: 19 from 6 nations

Medalists
gold medal	Benjaporn Limpanich (THA)
silver medal	Koi Sie Yan (MAS)
bronze medal	Daniela Reggie Dela Pisa (PHI)

The clubs competition for rhythmic gymnastics at the 2019 SEA Games in Philippines was held from 6 to 7 December 2019 at Rizal Memorial Coliseum.

== Schedule ==
All times are Philippine Standard Time (UTC+8).

Date	Time	Squad
Fri, 6 December 2019	12:10	Qualification
Sat, 7 December 2019	11:00	Final

== Results ==
=== Qualification ===
Note: Top eight qualified for final with a condition of maximum two gymnasts per nation.

Rank	Name	Difficulty	Execution	Penalty	Total
1	Koi Sie Yan (MAS)	9.100	8.100		17.200
2	Izzah Amzan (MAS)	9.400	7.400		16.800
3	Benjaporn Limpanich (THA)	9.400	7.000		16.400
4	Daniela Reggie Dela Pisa (PHI)	9.600	6.450		16.050
5	Amy Kwan (MAS)	8.500	6.750		15.250
6	Nguyễn Hà My (VIE)	9.000	6.100		15.100
7	Rayna Hoh Khai Ling (MAS)	8.300	6.650		14.950
8	Nat Kulsanawong (THA)	8.400	6.650		14.950
9	Ngo Hai Yen (VIE)	9.300	6.550		14.850
10	Shieldannah Sabio (PHI)	8.000	5.900		13.900
11	Arisa Tanthathoedtham (THA)	8.200	5.500		13.700
12	Leah Chew (SGP)	7.800	5.750		13.550
13	Avryl Tan Ying (SGP)	7.400	5.000		12.400
14	Alicia Lim Qian Hui (SGP)	6.900	4.900		11.800
15	Reyna Jean Cornel (PHI)	6.100	5.650		11.750
16	Carla Febri Florentina (INA)	7.000	4.500		11.500
17	Thalia Ester Mercilita (INA)	6.300	4.550		10.850
18	Marian Nicolle Medina (PHI)	6.400	4.250		10.650
19	Yeo Siew Lyn (SGP)	6.300	4.050		10.350

=== Final ===
Rank	Name	Difficulty	Execution	Penalty	Total
1st place, gold medalist(s)	Benjaporn Limpanich (THA)	9.800	7.350		17.150
2nd place, silver medalist(s)	Koi Sie Yan (MAS)	9.500	7.400		16.900
3rd place, bronze medalist(s)	Daniela Reggie Dela Pisa (PHI)	9.400	6.700		16.100
4	Nguyễn Hà My (VIE)	8.800	6.350	-0.05	15.100
5	Ngo Hai Yen (VIE)	8.900	6.150		15.050
6	Izzah Amzan (MAS)	9.100	5.750	-0.05	14.800
7	Nat Kulsanawong (THA)	7.900	5.650		13.550
8	Shieldannah Sabio (PHI)	7.200	5.250		12.450
