= Gymnastics at the 2019 SEA Games – Women's floor =

Gymnastics – Women's floor at the 2019 SEA Games
- Venue: Rizal Memorial Coliseum
- Date: 2 – 4 December 2019
- Competitors: 13 from 5 nations

Medalists
gold medal	Farah Ann Abdul Hadi (MAS)
silver medal	Rifda Irfanaluthfi (INA)
bronze medal	Trần Đoàn Quỳnh Nam (VIE)

The women's floor competition for gymnastics artistic at the 2019 SEA Games in the Philippines was held from 2 to 4 December 2019 at Rizal Memorial Coliseum.

== Schedule ==
All times are Philippine Standard Time (UTC+8).

Date	Time	Round
Monday, 2 December	14:00	Qualification
Tuesday, 4 December	18:00	Final

== Results ==
=== Final ===
Rank	Name	Difficulty	Execution	Penalty	Total
1st place, gold medalist(s)	Farah Ann Abdul Hadi (MAS)	4.600	8.000		12.600
2nd place, silver medalist(s)	Rifda Irfanaluthfi (INA)	4.800	7.533		12.333
3rd place, bronze medalist(s)	Trần Đoàn Quỳnh Nam (VIE)	4.600	7.433		12.033
4	Tracie Ang (MAS)	4.500	7.300		11.800
5	Do Thi Van Anh (VIE)	4.000	7.567		11.567
6	Ma. Cristina Onofre (PHI)	4.300	7.067	-0.3	11.067
7	Yogi Rahmadhani (INA)	4.400	6.400	-0.3	10.500
8	Mya Kalani Wilson (PHI)	4.200	5.467		9.667
