= Gymnastics at the 2019 SEA Games – Women's vault =

Gymnastics – Women's vault at the 2019 SEA Games
- Venue: Rizal Memorial Coliseum
- Date: 2 – 3 December 2019
- Competitors: 14 from 6 nations

Medalists
gold medal	Rifda Irfanaluthfi (INA)
silver medal	Tan Ing Yueh (MAS)
bronze medal	Đỗ Thị Vân Anh (VIE)

The women's vault competition for gymnastics artistic at the 2019 SEA Games in Philippines was held from 2 to 3 December 2019 at Rizal Memorial Coliseum.

== Schedule ==
All times are Philippine Standard Time (UTC+8).

Date	Time	Round
Monday, 2 December	14:00	Qualification
Tuesday, 3 December	16:30	Final

== Results ==
=== Final ===
Rank	Name	Vault 1				Vault 2				Total average
Rank	Name	Difficulty	Execution	Penalty	Total	Difficulty	Execution	Penalty	Total	Total average
1st place, gold medalist(s)	Rifda Irfanaluthfi (INA)	4.400	8.967		13.367	4.600	9.000		13.600	13.484
2nd place, silver medalist(s)	Tan Ing Yueh (MAS)	4.600	8.933	-0.3	13.233	4.600	8.767		13.367	13.300
3rd place, bronze medalist(s)	Đỗ Thị Vân Anh (VIE)	4.600	8.700		13.300	4.600	8.500		13.100	13.200
4	Farah Ann Abdul Hadi (MAS)	4.600	8.733	-0.3	13.033	4.200	8.567		12.767	12.900
5	Ma. Cristina Onofre (PHI)	4.200	8.767		12.967	4.000	8.733		12.733	12.850
6	Amalia Nurun Nubuwah (INA)	4.000	8.667		12.667	3.700	8.500		12.200	12.434
7	Trần Đoàn Quỳnh Nam (VIE)	4.600	8.500		13.100	4.200	7.467		11.667	12.384
8	Mya Kalani Wilson (PHI)	3.500	8.600		12.100	4.400	8.367	-0.3	12.467	12.284
