= Gymnastics at the 2019 SEA Games – Hoop =

Gymnastics – Hoop at the 2019 SEA Games
- Venue: Rizal Memorial Coliseum
- Date: 6–7 December 2019
- Competitors: 19 from 6 nations

Medalists
gold medal	Daniela Reggie Dela Pisa (PHI)
silver medal	Izzah Amzan (MAS)
bronze medal	Amy Kwan (MAS)

The hoop competition for rhythmic gymnastics at the 2019 SEA Games in the Philippines was held from 6 to 7 December 2019 at Rizal Memorial Coliseum.

== Schedule ==
All times are Philippine Standard Time (UTC+8).

Date	Time	Squad
Fri, 6 December 2019	10:00	Qualification
Sat, 7 December 2019	10:00	Final

== Results ==
=== Qualification ===
Note: Top eight qualified for final with a condition of maximum two gymnasts per nation.

Rank	Name	Difficulty	Execution	Penalty	Total
1	Izzah Amzan (MAS)	9.100	7.700		16.800
2	Daniela Reggie Dela Pisa (PHI)	10.500	5.750		16.250
3	Amy Kwan (MAS)	8.600	7.250		15.850
4	Koi Sie Yan (MAS)	8.200	7.350		15.550
5	Nguyễn Hà My (VIE)	8.700	6.600		15.300
6	Benjaporn Limpanich (THA)	9.200	5.900	-0.3	14.800
7	Arisa Tanthathoedtham (THA)	8.200	5.900		14.100
8	Leah Chew (SGP)	8.000	5.750		13.750
9	Shieldannah Sabio (PHI)	7.000	5.900		12.900
10	Rayna Hoh Khai Ling (MAS)	7.400	5.500		12.900
11	Marian Nicolle Medina (PHI)	7.600	5.300		12.900
12	Ngo Hai Yen (VIE)	8.300	4.400		12.700
13	Thalia Ester Mercilita (INA)	7.000	5.350		12.350
14	Nat Kulsanawong (THA)	7.200	4.950		12.150
15	Yeo Siew Lyn (SGP)	7.200	4.800		12.000
16	Carla Febri Florentina (INA)	7.300	3.900		11.200
17	Reyna Jean Cornel (PHI)	6.400	4.700		11.100
18	Alicia Lim Qian Hui (SGP)	6.900	3.550		10.450
19	Avryl Tan Ying (SGP)	6.600	3.700	-0.3	10.000

=== Final ===
Rank	Name	Difficulty	Execution	Penalty	Total
1st place, gold medalist(s)	Daniela Reggie Dela Pisa (PHI)	11.400	6.350		17.750
2nd place, silver medalist(s)	Izzah Amzan (MAS)	8.800	7.750	-0.05	16.500
3rd place, bronze medalist(s)	Amy Kwan (MAS)	8.600	7.350	-0.05	15.900
4	Nguyễn Hà My (VIE)	8.400	6.800		15.200
5	Arisa Tanthathoedtham (THA)	7.400	6.100		13.500
6	Shieldannah Sabio (PHI)	6.800	6.600		13.400
7	Benjaporn Limpanich (THA)	7.400	6.050	-0.35	13.100
8	Leah Chew (SGP)	6.600	5.100		11.700
