= Gymnastics at the 2019 SEA Games – Ribbon =

Gymnastics – Ribbon at the 2019 SEA Games
- Venue: Rizal Memorial Coliseum
- Date: 6–7 December 2019
- Competitors: 19 from 6 nations

Medalists
gold medal	Koi Sie Yan & Izzah Amzan (MAS)
bronze medal	Nat Kulsanawong (THA)

The ribbon competition for rhythmic gymnastics at the 2019 SEA Games in Philippines was held from 6 to 7 December 2019 at Rizal Memorial Coliseum.

== Schedule ==
All times are Philippine Standard Time (UTC+8).

Date	Time	Squad
Fri, 6 December 2019	13:15	Qualification
Sat, 7 December 2019	11:30	Final

== Results ==
=== Qualification ===
Note: Top eight qualified for final with a condition of maximum two gymnasts per nation.

Rank	Name	Difficulty	Execution	Penalty	Total
1	Benjaporn Limpanich (THA)	8.600	6.500		15.100
2	Izzah Amzan (MAS)	8.000	6.950		14.950
3	Koi Sie Yan (MAS)	7.200	7.400		14.600
4	Nat Kulsanawong (THA)	7.900	5.700		13.600
5	Shieldannah Sabio (PHI)	7.500	5.800		13.300
6	Leah Chew (SGP)	7.500	5.550		13.050
7	Arisa Tanthathoedtham (THA)	5.900	6.450		12.350
8	Rayna Hoh Khai Ling (MAS)	5.800	6.100		11.900
9	Amy Kwan (MAS)	6.100	5.750		11.850
10	Carla Febri Florentina (INA)	7.200	4.200		11.400
11	Daniela Reggie Dela Pisa (PHI)	7.900	3.400		11.300
12	Marian Nicolle Medina (PHI)	6.100	5.200		11.000
13	Thalia Ester Mercilita (INA)	6.300	4.650		10.950
14	Ngo Hai Yen (VIE)	5.600	4.850		10.450
15	Alicia Lim Qian Hui (SGP)	5.300	4.650		9.950
16	Avryl Tan Ying (SGP)	4.900	4.950		9.850
17	Reyna Jean Cornel (PHI)	4.900	4.500		9.400
18	Yeo Siew Lyn (SGP)	3.300	5.150		8.450
19	Nguyễn Hà My (VIE)	3.200	4.400		7.600

=== Final ===
Rank	Name	Difficulty	Execution	Penalty	Total
1st place, gold medalist(s)	Koi Sie Yan (MAS)	8.100	7.100		15.200
1st place, gold medalist(s)	Izzah Amzan (MAS)	8.300	6.900		15.200
3rd place, bronze medalist(s)	Nat Kulsanawong (THA)	7.300	6.750		14.050
4	Shieldannah Sabio (PHI)	7.200	6.600		13.800
5	Benjaporn Limpanich (THA)	7.100	5.350		12.450
6	Leah Chew (SGP)	6.600	5.650		12.250
7	Daniela Reggie Dela Pisa (PHI)	6.800	4.850		11.650
8	Carla Febri Florentina (INA)	6.300	4.600	-0.10	10.900
