= Gymnastics at the 2019 SEA Games – Ball =

Gymnastics – Ball at the 2019 SEA Games
- Venue: Rizal Memorial Coliseum
- Date: 6–7 December 2019
- Competitors: 18 from 6 nations

Medalists
gold medal	Izzah Amzan (MAS)
silver medal	Nat Kulsanawong (THA)
bronze medal	Daniela Reggie Dela Pisa (PHI)

The ball competition for rhythmic gymnastics at the 2019 SEA Games in Philippines was held from 6 to 7 December 2019 at Rizal Memorial Coliseum.

== Schedule ==
All times are Philippine Standard Time (UTC+8).

Date	Time	Squad
Fri, 6 December 2019	11:05	Qualification
Sat, 7 December 2019	10:30	Final

== Results ==
=== Qualification ===
Note: Top eight qualified for final with a condition of maximum two gymnasts per nation.

Rank	Name	Difficulty	Execution	Penalty	Total
1	Koi Sie Yan (MAS)	8.900	7.050		15.950
2	Benjaporn Limpanich (THA)	9.200	6.750		15.950
3	Daniela Reggie Dela Pisa (PHI)	9.200	5.950		15.150
4	Izzah Amzan (MAS)	8.800	5.850		14.650
5	Rayna Hoh Khai Ling (MAS)	8.500	5.900		14.400
6	Avryl Tan Ying (SGP)	8.200	5.950		14.150
7	Leah Chew (SGP)	8.800	5.350		14.150
8	Nat Kulsanawong (THA)	8.000	6.050		14.050
9	Nguyễn Hà My (VIE)	7.900	5.900		13.800
10	Shieldannah Sabio (PHI)	7.000	5.550		12.550
11	Reyna Jean Cornel (PHI)	7.000	5.200		12.200
12	Arisa Tanthathoedtham (THA)	7.500	4.900	-0.3	12.100
13	Alicia Lim Qian Hui (SGP)	7.500	4.550		12.050
14	Ngo Hai Yen (VIE)	6.500	5.250		11.750
15	Yeo Siew Lyn (SGP)	6.600	4.750		11.350
16	Thalia Ester Mercilita (INA)	6.500	3.850	-0.1	10.250
17	Carla Febri Florentina (INA)	6.100	3.500		9.600
18	Marian Nicolle Medina (PHI)	5.400	2.950	-0.6	7.750

=== Final ===
Rank	Name	Difficulty	Execution	Penalty	Total
1st place, gold medalist(s)	Izzah Amzan (MAS)	10.400	7.400		17.800
2nd place, silver medalist(s)	Nat Kulsanawong (THA)	8.900	7.400		16.300
3rd place, bronze medalist(s)	Daniela Reggie Dela Pisa (PHI)	9.100	6.500		15.600
4	Leah Chew (SGP)	9.000	5.500		14.500
5	Koi Sie Yan (MAS)	7.800	6.400		14.200
6	Benjaporn Limpanich (THA)	8.100	5.150		13.250
7	Avryl Tan Ying (SGP)	7.300	5.300		12.600
8	Nguyễn Hà My (VIE)	7.600	5.000	-0.35	12.250
