= Bowling at the 2019 SEA Games – Men's team of 4 =

Bowling – Men's team of 4 at the 2019 SEA Games
- Venue: Coronado Lanes, Starmall EDSA-Shaw
- Location: Mandaluyong, Philippines
- Date: 6 December 2019
- Competitors: 28 from 7 nations

Medalists
gold medal	Rafiq Ismail; Tun Hakim; Tan Chye Chern; Ahmad Muaz	Malaysia
silver medal	Kenneth Chua; Patrick Nuqui; Frederick Ong; Merwin Tan	Philippines
bronze medal	Atchariya Cheng; Surasak Manuwong; Annop Arromsaranon; Yannaphon Larpapharat	Thailand

The men's team of four competition for bowling at the 2019 SEA Games in Philippines was held on 6 December 2019 at Coronado Lanes, Starmall EDSA-Shaw.

== Schedule ==
All times are Philippine Standard Time (UTC+8).

Date	Time	Squad
Fri, 6 December 2019	09:00	1st block
Fri, 6 December 2019	14:00	2nd block

== Results ==
Detailed result as in below:

Rank	Team	Game						Total
Rank	Team	1	2	3	4	5	6	Total
1st place, gold medalist(s)	Malaysia (MAS)	864	763	819	832	806	896	4980
	Rafiq Ismail	233	197	222	227	171	246	1296
	Tun Hakim	224	177	192	229	206	190	1218
	Tan Chye Chern	217	197	214	196	235	268	1327
	Ahmad Muaz	190	192	191	180	194	192	1139
2nd place, silver medalist(s)	Philippines (PHI)	822	761	863	837	768	886	4937
	Kenneth Chua	215	174	204	172	176	179	1120
	Patrick Nuqui	181	171	237	224	201	256	1270
	Frederick Ong	202	174	177	199	179	243	1174
	Merwin Tan	224	242	245	242	212	208	1373
3rd place, bronze medalist(s)	Thailand (THA)	841	803	818	866	764	804	4896
	Atchariya Cheng	210	218	229	268	169	190	1284
	Surasak Manuwong	175	208	227	160	196	216	1182
	Annop Arromsaranon	239	205	182	201	214	187	1228
	Yannaphon Larpapharat	217	172	180	237	185	211	1202
4	Indonesia (INA)	807	853	883	790	683	820	4836
	Ryan Leonard Lalisang	236	244	236	234	152	201	1303
	Yeri Ramadona	205	221	223	185	200	217	1251
	Billy Muhammad Islam	191	230	225	174	152	144	1116
	Hardy Rachmadian	175	158	199	197	179	258	1166
5	Singapore (SGP)	739	768	719	777	804	845	4652
	Alex Chong	190	165	184	172	174	188	1073
	Basil Dill Ng	201	202	150	211	192	203	1159
	Cheah Ray Han	183	183	182	221	191	222	1182
	Muhd Jaris Goh	165	218	203	173	247	232	1238
6	Brunei (BRU)	737	722	759	676	748	759	4401
	Faiz Dzuhairy Dzafran	180	183	168	173	194	207	1105
	Awangku Haziqquddin Shah Wardi	158	191	159	182	242	168	1100
	Muhammad Al-Amin	201	157	215	172	191	195	1131
	Abu Khaledi Yussrri	198	191	217	149	121	189	1065
7	Vietnam (VIE)	727	719	755	669	727	677	4274
	Huynh Binh Quoc Su	198	225	175	193	208	178	1177
	Pham Phu Gia	159	149	189	148	147	183	975
	Tran Tuan Anh	156	174	216	168	189	163	1066
	Nguyen Pho Thanh	214	171	175	160	183	153	1056
