= Christopher Buraga =

Filipino squash player (born 2006)

Personal information
- Born: August 3, 2006 (age 19)

Sport
- Country: Philippines
- Coached by: Jaime Ortua; Low Wee Wern
Medal record
Men's squash
Representing Philippines
SEA Games
Silver medal – second place	2019 Philippines	Team
Asian Junior Championships
Silver medal – second place	2019 Macau	Boy's U13 individual

Christopher Buraga (born August 3, 2006) is a Filipino squash player.

== Career ==
Buraga learned how to play squash from his grandfather Jaime Ortua at eight years old. Ortua was also a national coach. He has been representing the Philippines as early as 2017.

The Philippine Squash Academy (PSA) added Buraga to the national team as a reserve player for the 5th SEA Cup Squash Championship hosted in Taguig. At the 2019 SEA Games, a 13-year old Buraga and his compatriots won silver in the men's team.

In 2021, he became the top player in the Asian U17 rankings and won several junior continental titles.

Buraga had better training when the National Squash Center at the Rizal Memorial Sports Complex was finished as well as the PSA bringing in retired Malaysian player Low Wee Wern to coach Filipino national squash players.

He played at the 2024 Men's World Junior Squash Championships in Houston and the 2024 Men's World Team Squash Championships in Hong Kong.

== Personal life ==
Buraga's father is a security guard while his mother is a housewife. He is the youngest among four siblings. He attended Sergio Osmena High School in Quezon City. He bought a residential property for his parents in Cavite after he received incentives from his 2019 SEA Games win.
