= Bowling at the 2019 SEA Games – Men's doubles =

Bowling – Men's doubles at the 2019 SEA Games
- Venue: Coronado Lanes, Starmall EDSA-Shaw
- Location: Mandaluyong, Philippines
- Date: 4 December 2019
- Competitors: 30 from 8 nations

Medalists
gold medal	Billy Muhammad Islam; Hardy Rachmadian	Indonesia
silver medal	Atchariya Cheng; Surasak Manuwong	Thailand
bronze medal	Tun Hakim; Rafiq Ismail	Malaysia

The men's doubles competition for bowling at the 2019 SEA Games in Philippines was held on 4 December 2019 at Coronado Lanes, Starmall EDSA-Shaw.

== Results ==
Detailed result as in below:

Rank	Team	Game						Total
Rank	Team	1	2	3	4	5	6	Total
1st place, gold medalist(s)	Indonesia (INA)	373	452	483	397	461	426	2592
	Billy Muhammad Islam	204	194	224	206	201	200	1229
	Hardy Rachmadian	169	258	259	191	260	226	1363
2nd place, silver medalist(s)	Thailand (THA)	433	447	405	453	456	370	2564
	Atchariya Cheng	209	235	227	232	245	184	1332
	Surasak Manuwong	224	212	178	221	211	186	1232
3rd place, bronze medalist(s)	Malaysia (MAS)	375	458	449	417	423	434	2556
	Tun Hakim	181	255	180	204	201	228	1249
	Rafiq Ismail	194	203	269	213	222	206	1307
4	Indonesia (INA)	392	330	436	404	522	432	2516
	Ryan Lalisang	168	150	223	238	299	201	1279
	Yeri Ramadona	224	180	213	166	223	231	1237
5	Philippines (PHI)	477	401	379	393	413	357	2420
	Kenneth Chua	245	212	189	203	182	145	1176
	Patrick Nuqui	232	189	190	190	231	212	1244
6	Singapore (SGP)	424	414	451	370	382	378	2419
	Basil Dill Ng	212	258	229	183	211	203	1296
	Alex Chong	212	156	222	187	171	175	1123
7	Thailand (THA)	460	374	340	384	431	408	2397
	Annop Arromsaranon	217	166	140	156	215	207	1101
	Yannaporn Larpapharat	243	208	200	228	216	201	1296
8	Singapore (SGP)	345	371	422	388	441	422	2389
	Cheah Ray Han	160	171	206	204	237	236	1214
	Mohd Jaris Goh	185	200	216	184	204	186	1175
9	Philippines (PHI)	356	398	373	364	443	450	2384
	Merwin Tan	197	190	181	170	218	245	1201
	Frederick Ong	159	208	192	194	225	205	1183
10	Malaysia (MAS)	349	383	343	409	449	445	2378
	Ahmad Muaz	161	195	182	237	215	222	1212
	Tan Chye Chern	188	188	161	172	234	223	1166
11	Brunei (BRU)	377	410	365	352	440	358	2302
	Abu Khaledi Yussrri	192	231	153	170	194	209	1149
	Awangku Haziqquddin Shah Wardi	185	179	212	182	246	149	1153
12	Brunei (BRU)	421	370	320	341	412	333	2197
	Faiz Dzuhairy Dzafran	219	163	159	171	233	148	1093
	Muhammad Al-Amin	202	207	161	170	179	185	1104
13	Myanmar (MYA)	376	355	384	386	347	334	2182
	Tun Naing Lin	183	174	190	185	169	164	1065
	Ang Htay Win	193	181	194	201	178	170	1117
14	Vietnam (VIE)	410	408	341	312	327	336	2134
	Huynh Binh Quoc Su	204	163	208	164	165	154	1058
	Nguyen Pho Thanh	206	245	133	148	162	182	1076
15	Vietnam (VIE)	284	311	326	388	357	441	2107
	Pham Phu Gia	134	143	175	163	198	205	1018
	Tran Tuan Anh	150	168	151	225	159	236	1089
