= Rachel Yeoh Li Wen =

Malaysian artistic gymnast

- Full name: Rachel Yeoh Li Wen
- Born: 30 December 1998 (age 27) Pulau Pinang, Malaysia
- Height: 151 cm (4 ft 11 in)

Gymnastics career
- Discipline: Women's artistic gymnastics
- Country represented: Malaysia; (2015–present)
- Head coach: Ng Shu Wai
Medal record
Women's gymnastics
Representing Malaysia
Southeast Asian Games
Gold medal – first place	2021 Vietnam	Uneven bars
Gold medal – first place	2021 Vietnam	Balance beam
Gold medal – first place	2025 Thailand	Uneven bars
Bronze medal – third place	2019 Philippines	Uneven bars
Bronze medal – third place	2021 Vietnam	All-around

Rachel Yeoh Li Wen (born 30 December 1998) is a Malaysian artistic gymnast. She is the 2021 and 2025 Southeast Asian Games champion on the uneven bars.

== Personal life ==
Yeoh was born in Pulau Pinang in 1998. She graduated from University of Putra Malaysia with a Bachelor of Science in Statistics in 2022.

== Gymnastics career ==
=== 2015–17 ===
Yeoh competed at the 2015 Asian Championships where she helped Malaysia place fourth as a team.

In 2017, while at a competition in Taiwan, Yeoh hyperextended her knee on vault which resulted in a posterior cruciate ligament injury on both knees. As a result, she had to miss the 2017 Southeast Asian Games.

=== 2019 ===
Yeoh returned to international competition in 2019 at the Stella Zakharova Cup. In May, she competed at the Zhaoqing Challenge Cup where she placed seventh on uneven bars. After missing out on the Southeast Asian Games in 2015 and 2017, Yeoh finally competed at the 2019 Southeast Asian Games where she won the bronze medal on uneven bars behind compatriot Farah Ann Abdul Hadi and Đỗ Thị Ngọc Hương of Vietnam.

=== 2022 ===
2021 Southeast Asian Games were postponed until 2022 due to the global COVID-19 pandemic. While she was there, Yeoh won the gold medal on the uneven bars and balance beam events and won the bronze medal in the all-around event behind Rifda Irfanaluthfi of Indonesia and Aleah Finnegan of the Philippines.

Yeoh represented Malaysia at the 2022 Commonwealth Games, where she placed 16th on uneven bars.

=== 2023 ===
In April of 2023, Yeoh participated in the Cairo World Cup, competing on uneven bars.

She competed at the Asian Championships in June, ranking 24th in the all-around. She was also second reserve for the uneven bars final.

=== 2024 ===
In early 2024, Yeoh participated in the FIG World Cup Series, competing on uneven bars and balance beam at the Baku, Cairo, and Cottbus World Cups.

At the Asian Championships in May, Yeoh finished 16th in the all-around.

=== 2025 ===
Yeoh began the 2025 season at the Osijek World Cup, qualifying for the uneven bars final and placing sixth.

At the 2025 Asian Championships, Yeo competed on uneven bars and balance beam, contributing to Malaysia's fifth-place finish as a team.

In October, Yeoh competed at the 2025 World Championships in Jakarta, her first World Championships appearance. She placed 38th on uneven bars.

Yeoh represented Malaysia at the 2025 Southeast Asian Games. After qualifying for the uneven bars final in first place, she won the gold medal on the event, ahead of Haylee Garcia of the Philippines and Colleen Hong of Singapore.

== Competitive history ==
Year	Event	Team	AA	VT	UB	BB	FX
2015
2015	Asian Championships	4					
2017	Stella Zakharova		9				
2019	Stella Zakharova Cup				4	8	
2019	Zhaoqing Challenge Cup				7		
2019	Asian Championships	5					
2019	Southeast Asian Games				3rd place, bronze medalist(s)		
2022	Southeast Asian Games		3rd place, bronze medalist(s)		1st place, gold medalist(s)	1st place, gold medalist(s)	8
2022	Commonwealth Games				16		
2023
2023	Cairo World Cup				21		
2023	Asian Championships		24		R2		
2024	Cairo World Cup					23	
2024	Cottbus World Cup				21		
2024	Baku World Cup				21		
2024	Asian Championships		16				
2025	Osijek World Cup				6		
2025	Asian Championships	5					
2025	World Championships				38		
2025	Southeast Asian Games				1st place, gold medalist(s)		
2026
2026	Asian Championships	5			7		
2026	Commonwealth Games	11			4		
2026	Asian Games	5			7		
2026	World Championships	24			15		
