= Andrea Lee (squash player) =

Malaysian squash player (born 1998)

Personal information
- Born: December 2, 1998 (age 27) Kuala Lumpur, Malaysia

Sport
- Country: Malaysia
- Handedness: Left Handed
- Retired: Active
- Racquet used: Grays

Women's singles
- Highest ranking: No. 74 (October 2017)
- Current ranking: No. 80 (February 2018)
- Updated on February, 2018

Andrea Lee (born 2 December 1998 in Kuala Lumpur) is a Malaysian professional squash player and a Division III Athlete for Colby College. A left-handed player, Lee achieved her career-high ranking of World No. 74 in October 2017. She won the 2017 Malaysian Squash Tour X professional tournament.
