= Robert Garcia (squash player) =

Filipino squash player (born 1986)

Personal information
- Full name: Robert Andrew Garcia
- Born: 15 April 1986 (age 40) Manila, Philippines
- Height: 175 cm (5 ft 9 in)
- Weight: 58 kg (128 lb)

Sport
- Country: Philippines
- Highest ranking: 216 (February 2018)
- Current ranking: 281 (August 2018)
Medal record
Men's squash
Representing Philippines
Southeast Asian Games
Gold medal – first place	2019 Philippines	Mixed team
Silver medal – second place	2019 Philippines	Singles
Silver medal – second place	2019 Philippines	Team
Silver medal – second place	2017 Kuala Lumpur	Team
Bronze medal – third place	2017 Kuala Lumpur	Singles
Bronze medal – third place	2017 Kuala Lumpur	Mixed doubles
Bronze medal – third place	2017 Kuala Lumpur	Jumbo doubles
Bronze medal – third place	2015 Kallang	Team
Bronze medal – third place	2007 Bangkok	Singles
Bronze medal – third place	2005 Makati	Singles

Robert Andrew Garcia (born 15 April 1986) is a Filipino male professional squash player.

He reached his highest career singles rankings of 216 in February 2018 during the 2018 PSA World Tour. He has represented Philippines at several international competitive events including the Southeast Asian Games, Asian Games, PSA World Tour and Asian Individual Squash Championships. He is the current leading male squash player to represent Philippines at international arena.

At the 2018 Asian Games, he reached round of 16 in the men's singles.
