= Squash at the 2015 SEA Games – Men's team =

Squash – Men's team at the 2015 SEA Games
- Venue: Kallang Squash Centre
- Dates: 11-13 June 2015
- Competitors: 22 from 6 nations

Medalists
gold medal	Malaysia (MAS)
silver medal	Singapore (SIN)
bronze medal	Indonesia (INA)
bronze medal	Philippines (PHI)

The men's team competition of the squash event at the 2015 Southeast Asian Games was held from 11 to 13 June at the Kallang Squash Centre, Kallang, Singapore.

== Schedule ==
Date	Time	Round
Thursday, 11 June 2015	12:00	Preliminaries
Thursday, 11 June 2015	19:00	Preliminaries
Friday, 12 June 2015	12:00	Preliminaries
Friday, 12 June 2015	19:00	Semifinals
Saturday, 13 June 2015	15:00	Finals

== Results ==
Source: Results Summary

=== Preliminary round ===
==== Pool A ====
Player	Pld	W	L	GF	GA	PF	PA	Points
Malaysia (MAS)	2	2	0	18	0	200	71	2
Philippines (PHI)	2	1	1	9	14	184	231	1
Thailand (THA)	2	0	2	5	18	165	247	0

11 June; 12:00	Report	Malaysia (MAS)	3–0	Philippines (PHI)	Kallang Squash Centre Court 1

11 June; 19:00	Report	Philippines (PHI)	3–0	Thailand (THA)	Kallang Squash Centre Court 7

12 June; 12:00	Report	Malaysia (MAS)	3–0	Thailand (THA)	Kallang Squash Centre Court 7

==== Pool B ====
Player	Pld	W	L	GF	GA	PF	PA	Points
Singapore (SIN)	2	2	0	18	2	211	107	2
Indonesia (INA)	2	1	1	11	9	167	134	1
Myanmar (MYA)	2	0	2	0	18	61	198	0

11 June; 12:00	Report	Singapore (SIN)	3–0	Myanmar (MYA)	Kallang Squash Centre Court 7

11 June; 19:00	Report	Indonesia (INA)	3–0	Myanmar (MYA)	Kallang Squash Centre Court 1

12 June; 12:00	Report	Singapore (SIN)	3–0	Indonesia (INA)	Kallang Squash Centre Court 1

=== Knockout round ===
Semifinals; 12 June 19:00
Singapore (SIN)	2
Philippines (PHI)	0
Malaysia (MAS)	2
Indonesia (INA)	0

Gold medal match 13 June 15:00
Singapore (SIN)	0
Malaysia (MAS)	2

==== Semifinals ====
12 June; 19:00	Report	Singapore (SIN)	2–0	Philippines (PHI)	Kallang Squash Centre Court 1

12 June; 19:00	Report	Malaysia (MAS)	2–0	Indonesia (INA)	Kallang Squash Centre Court 7

==== Gold medal match ====
13 June; 15:00	Report	Singapore (SIN)	0–2	Malaysia (MAS)	Kallang Squash Centre Court 1
