= Rachel Arnold =

Malaysian squash player (born 1996)

Personal information
- Full name: Rachel Mae Arnold
- Born: 16 April 1996 (age 30) Kuala Lumpur, Malaysia
- Height: 166 cm (5 ft 5 in)
- Weight: 64 kg (141 lb)

Sport
- Country: Malaysia
- Handedness: right handed
- Racquet used: Technifibre
- Highest ranking: 17 (December 204)
- Current ranking: 19 (14 July 2025)
Medal record
Women's squash
Representing Malaysia
World Team Championships
Bronze medal – third place	2022 Cairo	Team
Bronze medal – third place	2024 Hong Kong	Team
World Doubles Championships
Bronze medal – third place	2016 Melbourne	Doubles
Bronze medal – third place	2022 Glasgow	Doubles
Commonwealth Games
Bronze medal – third place	2022 Birmingham	Women's doubles
Asian Games
Gold medal – first place	2022 Hangzhou	Team
Gold medal – first place	2026 Aichi-Nagoya	Team
Bronze medal – third place	2026 Aichi–Nagoya	Mixed Doubles
Asian Individual Championships
Silver medal – second place	2021 Islamabad	Singles
Silver medal – second place	2025 Kuala Lumpur	Singles
Southeast Asian Games
Gold medal – first place	2017 Malaysia	Doubles
Gold medal – first place	2019 Philippines	Singles
Gold medal – first place	2019 Philippines	Team
Silver medal – second place	2017 Malaysia	Singles
Asian Youth Games
Gold medal – first place	2013 Nanjing	Team

Rachel Mae Arnold (born 16 April 1996) is a Malaysian squash player who represents Malaysia women's national squash team. She reached a career high ranking of number 17 in the world during December 2024. She is the youngest daughter of former Malaysian Squash coach Raymond Arnold and sister of former Malaysian squash players Timothy Arnold and Delia Arnold.

== Career ==
Arnold started her international squash career in 2016, and reached the world ranking of 64 by the end of 2016. She reached her career best world ranking to date, in December 2017 after winning the Malaysian Open Squash Championships singles in May 2017. Rachel Arnold also won the women's singles at the SEA Games Championship in 2017. Rachel also competed at the 2014 Commonwealth Games.

In 2022, she won a bronze at the 2022 Women's World Team Squash Championships.

After a first round exit at the 2024 PSA Women's World Squash Championship in May, Arnold won her 6th PSA title after securing victory in the China Open during the 2024–25 PSA Squash Tour.

Arnold helped Malaysia win another bronze medal at the December 2024 Women's World Team Squash Championships.
