= Squash at the 2019 SEA Games =

- Venue: Manila Polo Club
- Location: Makati, Metro Manila
- Date: 1–9 December

The squash competitions at the 2019 Southeast Asian Games in the Philippines were held from 1 to 9 December 2019 at the Manila Polo Club in Makati, Metro Manila.

== Background ==
Nine events were proposed for squash at the 2019 Southeast Asian Games with six events approved to be hosted. However, due to delays in the construction of the squash courts at the Rizal Memorial Sports Complex, the original venue, the number of events were trimmed to five. The men's double jumbo, women's double jumbo, and mixed doubles were scrapped and replaced with team events for both men and women.

== Venue ==
Squash events were held at the Manila Polo Club in Makati. It was initially scheduled to take place at the squash courts at the Rizal Memorial Sports Complex in Manila. The Kerry Sports gymnasium inside the Shangri-La at the Fort in Taguig was also considered as a backup venue for squash.

== Participating nations ==
- Philippines (7)
- Malaysia (9)
- Singapore (8)
- Thailand (8)
- Indonesia (8)

== Medal summaries ==
=== Medalists ===
Event	Gold	Silver	Bronze
Men's singles	Addeen Idrakie; Malaysia	Robert Garcia; Philippines	Chua Man Chin; Singapore
Men's singles	Addeen Idrakie; Malaysia	Robert Garcia; Philippines	Darren Rahul Pragasam; Malaysia
Women's singles	Rachel Arnold; Malaysia	Chan Yiwen; Malaysia	Au Yeong Wai Yhann; Singapore
Women's singles	Rachel Arnold; Malaysia	Chan Yiwen; Malaysia	Jemyca Aribado; Philippines
Men's team	Malaysia; Ryan Pasqual; Addeen Idrakie; Darren Rahul Pragasam; Ong Sai Hung	Philippines; Robert Garcia; David William Pelino; Christopher Buraga; Reymark Begornia	Indonesia; Agung Wilant; Satria Bagus Laksana; Mohammad Faisal; Rahmad Diyanto
Men's team	Malaysia; Ryan Pasqual; Addeen Idrakie; Darren Rahul Pragasam; Ong Sai Hung	Philippines; Robert Garcia; David William Pelino; Christopher Buraga; Reymark Begornia	Singapore; Aaron-Jon Liang; Samuel Kang; Chua Man Chin; Chua Man Tong
Women's team	Malaysia; Yee Xin Ying; Rachel Arnold; Ooi Kah Yan; Wen Li Lai	Singapore; Sneha Sivakumar; Au Yeong Wai Yhann; Yukino Tan; Sherilyn Yang	Indonesia; Maudy Wafa Nadiyah; Yaisha Putri Yasandi; Nisa Nur Fadillah; Catur Yuliana
Women's team	Malaysia; Yee Xin Ying; Rachel Arnold; Ooi Kah Yan; Wen Li Lai	Singapore; Sneha Sivakumar; Au Yeong Wai Yhann; Yukino Tan; Sherilyn Yang	Philippines; Alyssa Yvonne; Jemyca Aribado; Jimmie Avilla
Mixed team	Philippines; David William Pelino; Jemyca Aribado; Robert Garcia; Reymark Begornia	Singapore; Aaron-Jon Liang; Au Yeong Wai Yhann; Samuel Kang; Sneha Sivakumar; Timothy Leong	Indonesia; Agung Wilant; Catur Yuliana; Satria Bagus Laksana
Mixed team	Philippines; David William Pelino; Jemyca Aribado; Robert Garcia; Reymark Begornia	Singapore; Aaron-Jon Liang; Au Yeong Wai Yhann; Samuel Kang; Sneha Sivakumar; Timothy Leong	Thailand; Anantana Prasertratanakul; Chattaporn Juntanayingyong; Natthakit Jivasuwan; Phuwis Poonsiri; Tuddaw Thamronglarp

=== Medal table ===
* Host nation (Philippines)

Rank	Nation	Gold	Silver	Bronze	Total
1	Malaysia (MAS)	4	1	1	6
2	Philippines (PHI)*	1	2	2	5
3	Singapore (SGP)	0	2	3	5
4	Indonesia (INA)	0	0	3	3
5	Thailand (THA)	0	0	1	1
Totals (5 entries)		5	5	10	20
