= Rifda Irfanaluthfi =

Indonesian artistic gymnast

- Irfanaluthfi at the 2017 SEA Games

Personal information
- Born: 16 October 1999 (age 27) Jakarta, Indonesia
- Height: 1.51 m (4 ft 11 in)

Gymnastics career
- Discipline: Women's artistic gymnastics
- Country represented: Indonesia
- Club: DKI Jakarta
- Head coach: Eva Novalina Butarbutar
Medal record
Artistic Gymnastics
Representing Indonesia
Asian Games
Silver medal – second place	2018 Jakarta–Palembang	Floor exercise
Islamic Solidarity Games
Bronze medal – third place	2017 Baku	Team
Bronze medal – third place	2017 Baku	Vault
SEA Games
Gold medal – first place	2017 Kuala Lumpur	Balance beam
Gold medal – first place	2019 Philippines	Vault
Gold medal – first place	2021 Vietnam	All-around
Gold medal – first place	2021 Vietnam	Floor exercise
Silver medal – second place	2015 Singapore	Floor exercise
Silver medal – second place	2017 Kuala Lumpur	Vault
Silver medal – second place	2019 Philippines	All-around
Silver medal – second place	2019 Philippines	Balance beam
Silver medal – second place	2019 Philippines	Floor exercise
Bronze medal – third place	2017 Kuala Lumpur	Team
Bronze medal – third place	2017 Kuala Lumpur	Uneven bars
Bronze medal – third place	2017 Kuala Lumpur	Floor exercise
Bronze medal – third place	2021 Vietnam	Vault
FIG World Cup
Event	1st	2nd	3rd
World Cup	0	0	1
World Challenge Cup	0	1	1
Total	0	1	2

Rifda Irfanaluthfi (born 16 October 1999) is an Indonesian artistic gymnast. She is the 2018 Asian Games floor exercise silver medalist and a four-time SEA Games champion. She is also a three-time medalist on the FIG World Cup series. She represented Indonesia at the 2024 Summer Olympics.

== Early life ==
Irfanaluthfi was born on 16 October 1999 in Jakarta, where she still lives and trains. She began gymnastics when she was in the first grade.

== Gymnastics career ==
=== 2015 ===
On 25 March 2015, Irfanaluthfi made her international debut at the Doha World Cup, performing on vault, balance beam, and floor exercise. She didn't make it past qualifications. In June 2015, she competed at the 2015 SEA Games. She finished fifth in the all-around final, with a total score of 49.600, after falling on her 2.5 twist on the floor and her back handspring-back tuck series on the beam. She finished fourth on vault after falling on her second vault, a full-twisting Yurchenko. She also finished fourth on the balance beam, with another fall on her back handspring-back tuck series. But on the floor, she finished second, just 0.033 behind Farah Ann Abdul Hadi, becoming the only Indonesian gymnast to medal at the competition.

At the Asian Championships in Hiroshima, Irfanaluthfi performed only her two best events, balance beam and floor, finishing sixth on balance beam and as the first reserve on floor exercise. After she won three gold medals at the Indonesian National Students Games in September and two golds at the Indonesian National Youth Games—representing her home province, Jakarta, the Jakarta Department of Youth and Sport sent her to the World Championships in Glasgow. There, she placed 126th out of 191 gymnasts who competed all four events in qualifications, with a total score of 48.332, and she missed qualifying to the 2016 Olympic Test Event by about two points.

=== 2016—2017 ===
Irfanaluthfi competed at the 2016 Indonesian National Games, winning gold medals in the all-around, vault, and floor exercise.

In May, Irfanaluthfi competed at the 2017 Islamic Solidarity Games in Baku, Azerbaijan. She claimed a bronze medal with the Indonesian team, behind Azerbaijan and Turkey. Individually, she placed third in all-around and vault, fifth on uneven bars, and fourth on balance beam and floor exercise. She then competed at the 2017 SEA Games in Kuala Lumpur, Malaysia. She won the bronze medal in the team competition with her teammates Amalia Fauziah, Armartiani, and Tazsa Miranda. Although there was no official all-around competition, her total score of 51.350 was the highest in the competition. In the event finals, she won a silver medal on vault, bronze on uneven bars, gold on balance beam, and another bronze on floor exercise, making her the most decorated gymnast of the competition with five medals. At the 2017 Voronin Cup, she won the bronze medal on floor exercise.

=== 2018 ===
Irfanaluthfi competed on the balance beam at the Doha World Cup, placing 31st in the qualification round with a score of 11.233. Then at the Koper World Challenge Cup, she placed eighth on vault, sixth on balance beam, and fourth on floor exercise. At the Mersin World Challenge Cup in Mersin, Turkey, she earned the silver medal on vault, her first world cup medal, and earned her second medal, a bronze on floor exercise.

Irfanaluthfi competed at the 2018 Asian Games in her hometown Jakarta. In the all-around final, she placed 18th with a total score of 47.100. In the event finals, she placed fourth on the vault and won a silver medal on the floor exercise behind North Korea's Kim Su-jong. At the 2018 World Artistic Gymnastics Championships in Doha, she finished 57th in the all-around in qualifications with a total score of 49.266.

=== 2019—2021 ===
Irfanaluthfi competed with the Indonesian team at the FIT Challenge where they finished 14th. She then competed at the Summer Universiade where she finished fifth in the vault final. At the World Championships, she finished 142nd in the all-around during the qualification round and did not qualify for the 2020 Olympic Games. She then competed at the SEA Games, winning the all-around silver medal behind Farah Ann Abdul Hadi. In the event finals, she won gold on the vault and silver medals on the balance beam and floor exercise.

In 2020, Irfanaluthfi fractured her left tibia. She returned to competition at the 2021 Varna World Challenge Cup where she finished fifth on vault and fourth on floor exercise.

=== 2022—2023 ===
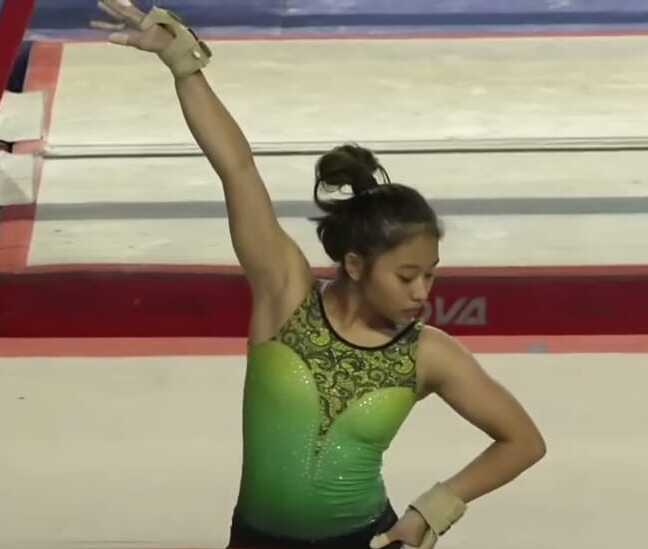
Irfanaluthfi at the 2021 SEA Games

Irfanaluthfi won the all-around title at the SEA Games, and in the event finals, she won gold on floor exercise, silver on uneven bars, and bronze on vault. Then at the 2022 Asian Championships, she finished 10th in the all-around. She finished 65th all-around in the qualification round at the 2022 World Championships.

Irfanaluthfi finished fifth on the vault at the 2023 Baku World Cup. Then at the Cairo World Cup, she won the bronze medal on the floor exercise behind Joscelyn Roberson and Alice D'Amato. She then placed fifth in the all-around at the Asian Championships and qualified for the 2023 World Championships. At the World Championships, she finished 52nd in the all-around during qualifications. She injured herself dismounting the uneven bars and required knee surgery. Among the athletes eligible for an Olympic berth, she was ranked 15th. Initially, only the top 14 gymnasts received Olympic berths, but after France qualified as a team, the host spot was reallocated to Irfanaluthfi. This made her the first Indonesian gymnast to qualify for the Olympics. She said that she hoped competing at the Olympics would increase awareness of gymnastics in Indonesia and inspire younger athletes, including those in other sports.

=== 2024 ===
At the 2024 Summer Olympics, Irfanaluthfi finished 80th in the uneven bars.

== Competitive history ==
Year	Event	Team	AA	VT	UB	BB	FX
2015	Doha World Cup			18		23	22
2015	SEA Games		5	4		4	2nd place, silver medalist(s)
2015	Asian Championships					6	R1
2015	World Championships		126				
2016	Indonesian National Games	2nd place, silver medalist(s)	1st place, gold medalist(s)	1st place, gold medalist(s)			1st place, gold medalist(s)
2017	Islamic Solidarity Games	3rd place, bronze medalist(s)		3rd place, bronze medalist(s)	5	4	4
2017	SEA Games	3rd place, bronze medalist(s)		2nd place, silver medalist(s)	3rd place, bronze medalist(s)	1st place, gold medalist(s)	3rd place, bronze medalist(s)
2017	Voronin Cup					5	3rd place, bronze medalist(s)
2018	Doha World Cup					31	
2018	Koper World Challenge Cup			8		6	4
2018	Mersin World Challenge Cup			2nd place, silver medalist(s)			3rd place, bronze medalist(s)
2018	Asian Games	8	18	4			2nd place, silver medalist(s)
2018	World Championships		57				
2019	FIT Challenge	14	50				
2019	Summer Universiade			5			
2019	World Championships		142				
2019	SEA Games		2nd place, silver medalist(s)	1st place, gold medalist(s)	5	2nd place, silver medalist(s)	2nd place, silver medalist(s)
2021	Varna World Challenge Cup			5			4
2022	SEA Games		1st place, gold medalist(s)	3rd place, bronze medalist(s)	2nd place, silver medalist(s)		1st place, gold medalist(s)
2022	Asian Championships		10				
2022	World Championships		65				
2023	Baku World Cup			5			
2023	Cairo World Cup			4			3rd place, bronze medalist(s)
2023	Asian Championships	8	5				
2023	World Championships		52				
2024
2024	Olympic Games				80		
