= Au Yeong Wai Yhann =

Singaporean squash player (born 1999)

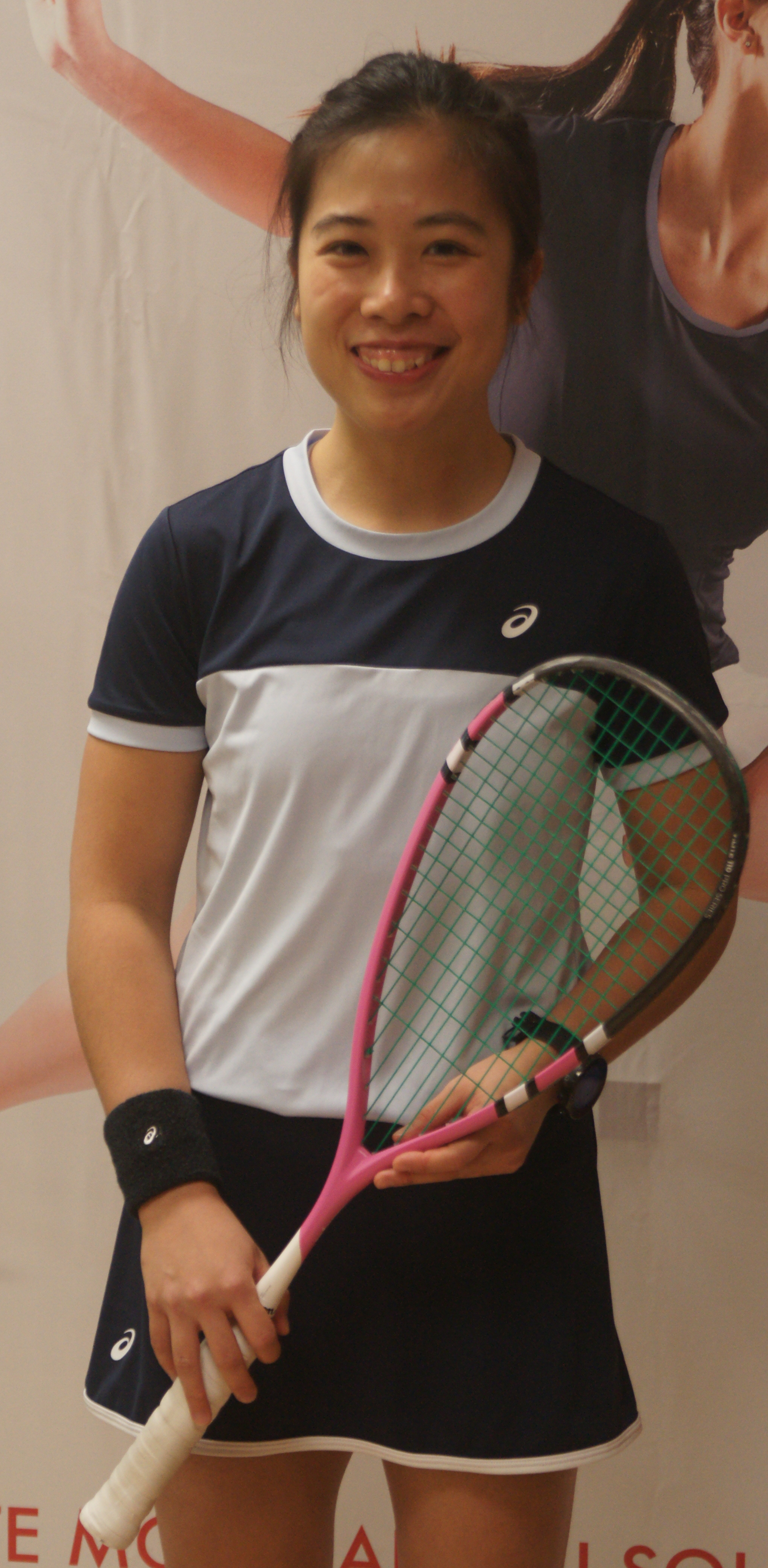
- Au Yeong in Monte-Carlo, 2023

Personal information
- Born: 18 January 1999 (age 27)
- Education: Singapore Sports School; University of the West of England
- Height: 153 cm (5 ft 0 in)
- Weight: 55 kg (121 lb)

Sport
- Country: Singapore
- Handedness: Righthanded
- Highest ranking: 81
Medal record
Women's squash
Representing Singapore
SEA Games
Silver medal – second place	2019 Philippines	Women's team
Silver medal – second place	2019 Philippines	Mixed team
Bronze medal – third place	2025 Thailand	Singles

Au Yeong Wai Yhann (born 18 January 1999), also known as Wai Yhann Au Yeong, is a Singaporean squash player. She became the first female Singaporean squash player to win a Professional Squash Association (PSA) Challenger Tour event and has won the Singapore Squash Open seven times.

== Biography ==
Au Yeong was born in Singapore on 18 January 1999. She studied the Extended International Baccalaureate Diploma Programme at the Singapore Sports School, studying in three years instead of the usual two to enable her to focus on training alongside school. Her sister Au Yeong Wai Lynn is also a squash player.

Au Yeong won the girls under 19s competition at the 2016 Singapore National Junior Squash Championships and at the 2016 Old Chang Kee Marigold Singapore Squash Open. At the 2016 Asian Individual Squash Championships in Taipei, China, Yhann was called up to the Singapore national team for the first time. She and the team finished sixth.

Au Yeong made her PSA World Tour debut in 2017, due to a wildcard entry at the 2017 Women's Asian Individual Squash Championships in Chennai, but was eliminated in the first round by Liu Tsz-Ling of Hong Kong. In the same year, Au Yeong represented Singapore at the 2017 Southeast Asian Games (SEA Games) in Kuala Lumpur, Malaysia, winning bronze in the mixed doubles and silver with the Singaporean women's team.

Au Yeong competed in her final junior squash tournament, the British Junior Open in Birmingham, West Midlands, in 2018.

At the 2019 SEA Games, Au Yeong won silver in the mixed team event and bronze in the women's singles event. At the Marigold National Squash Championships in December 2020, Au Yeong won the tournament, beating Gracia Chua in the final match.

Au Yeong has won seven Singapore Squash Open national women's squash titles. From 2022 to 2025, she was ranked the top female Singaporean squash player.

In 2022, Au Yeong also played in the CAS Serena Hotels/Combaxx International Squash Championships in Islamabad, Pakistan, during October 2022, winning the second round, before being beaten by Malik Khafagy of Egypt in the semi final match.

In September 2023, Au Yeong became the first female Singaporean squash player to win a PSA Challenger Tour event, beating England’s Kiera Marshall 3–1 in the Schraglage Squash Open final in Germany.

In November 2023, Au Yeong reached the quarter finals of the Aston and Fincher Sutton Coldfield International 2023, being beaten by Egypt's Nour Megahed. At the quarter finals of the 2023 Hyder Trophy in New York, unseeded player Lucie Stefanoni of the United States beat Au Yeong after four sets, which was considered a shock result by reporters of the PSA.

In March 2024, Au Yeong reached the semi final of the University of the West of England's Bristol Open, beating Scottish player Carys Jones in the second round and beating Akari Midorikawa of Japan in the quarter final, before losing to overall women's tournament winner Hana Ismail in the semi final. In December 2024, Au Yeong won her second PSA World Squash Tour title at the 2024 Madeira International Open, beating Pilar Etchechoury in the second round, Sofia Aveiro Pita in the quarter final, Anna Serme in the semi final and England's Isabel McCullough in the final.

In June 2025, Au Yeong reached the final sixteen in the 2025 Asian Individual Squash Championships, beating India's Pooja Arthi Raghu in the second round in three sets. She was then beaten in the quarter-final by Hong Kong's Tong Tsz Wing in three sets. At the 2025 Asian Squash Doubles Championships she played with Yew Sing Timothy Leong, being defeated by Velavan Senthilkumar and Joshna Chinappa of India in two sets. Au Yeong was also a finalist at the 2025 Aftab Jawaid Memorial Women Open at Houston Squash Club, Texas, defeating Isabella Tang of the United States in the semi final before coming second to Egyptian player Zeina Zein in the final match.

Au Yeong is training to qualify for the 2028 Summer Olympics in Los Angeles, California.

Au Yeong studied psychology at the University of the West of England, in Bristol, Gloucestershire, England, graduating in 2024. She is supported by Sport Singapore’s Sport Excellence (Spex) Scholarship.
