= Ooi Kah Yan =

Malaysian squash player (born 2000)

Personal information
- Born: December 6, 2000 (age 25) Seremban, Malaysia
- Education: University of Malaya

Sport
- Country: Malaysia
- Retired: Active

Women's singles
- Highest ranking: No. 72 (July 2020)
- Current ranking: No. 348 (September 2024)
Medal record
Women's squash
Representing Malaysia
Sukan Institusi Pengajian Tinggi
Gold medal – first place	SUKIPT 2022	Singles
Majlis Sukan Universiti Malaysia
Silver medal – second place	MASUM Fasa II, 2024	Singles
World Junior
Silver medal – second place	2019 Kuala Lumpur	Team
Southeast Asian Games
Gold medal – first place	2019 Philippines	Team
Gold medal – first place	2017 Kuala Lumpur	Team
Asian Team Squash Championships
Bronze medal – third place	2018 Cheongju, South Korea	Team
Women's pickleball
Representing Malaysia
Skechers KL International Pickleball Tournament 2024
Bronze medal – third place	Skechers 2024	Women's Singles 19+ Open
Silver medal – second place	Skechers 2024	Women's Doubles 19+ Intermediate
- Updated on 1 September 2024

Chinese name
- Traditional Chinese: 黃嘉恩
- Simplified Chinese: 黄嘉恩
- Hanyu Pinyin: Huáng Jiā'ēn
- Hokkien POJ: Ûiⁿ Ka-in

Ooi Kah Yan (born 6 December 2000 in Seremban) is a Malaysian professional squash player. Her highest PSA ranking was number 72 in the world, in July 2020.

In addition to her achievements in squash, she is also an active pickleball player. As of September 30, 2024, she is ranked No. 1 in Women's Singles in Malaysia and No. 25 globally according to Pickleball Global. She also claimed 3rd place in the Women's Singles Open category at the Skechers KL International Pickleball Tournament 2024.
