= Jemyca Aribado =

Filipino squash player (born 1993)

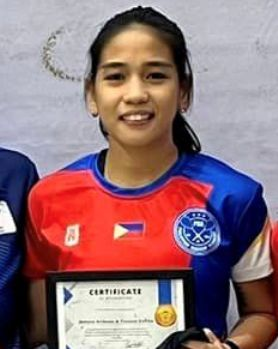
- Aribado in 2023

Personal information
- Born: September 21, 1993 (age 33) Taguig, Philippines
- Height: 159 cm (5 ft 3 in)
- Weight: 50 kg (110 lb)

Sport
- Coached by: Jaime Ortua

Women's singles
- Highest ranking: No. 77 (January 2019)
- Current ranking: No. 140 (November 2025)
- Title: 2
Medal record
Women's squash
Representing Philippines
Southeast Asian Games
Gold medal – first place	2019 Philippines	Mixed team
Silver medal – second place	2017 Kuala Lumpur	Jumbo doubles
Bronze medal – third place	2015 Singapore	Singles
Bronze medal – third place	2017 Kuala Lumpur	Singles
Bronze medal – third place	2017 Kuala Lumpur	Doubles
Bronze medal – third place	2017 Kuala Lumpur	Doubles
Bronze medal – third place	2017 Kuala Lumpur	Team
Bronze medal – third place	2019 Philippines	Singles
Bronze medal – third place	2019 Philippines	Team
Bronze medal – third place	2025 Thailand	Singles

Jemyca Aribado (born 21 September 1993) is a Filipino professional squash player. She reached a career high ranking of 77 in the world during January 2019.

== Career ==
Aribado's first experience with squash was when she was 5 years old. It was at the age of 12 or 13 when she decided to focus on the sport.

One of the three bronze medals of the Philippines at the 2015 Southeast Asian Games was won by Aribado.

At the 2016 South East Asian Cup Squash Championship in Myanmar, Aribado along with Yvonne Dalida secured the country's sole gold medal in the tournament by winning the women's jumbo double. She herself won a bronze in the individual event. At the 2017 Southeast Asian Games, she and Dalida settled for silver at the women's jumbo double. She won a bronze in the women's single while helped in winning three other bronze medals.

She made her debut in the Professional Squash Association (PSA) Tour in September 2016. at the PSA China Challenge Cup. She cited political issues with the national association and funding as factors that hindered her from joining the tour. By August 2017, she became the first Filipino player to break into the top 100 after she rose to rank 98.

In November 2025, she won her second PSA title after securing victory in the Singapore Challenger during the 2025–26 PSA Squash Tour.
