= Wen Li Lai =

Malaysian squash player (born 2000)

Personal information
- Born: May 28, 2000 (age 26) Sabah, Malaysia
- Height: 156 cm (5 ft 1 in)
- Weight: 48 kg (106 lb)

Sport
- Country: Malaysia
- Coached by: Ken Flynn
- Retired: Active
- Racquet used: Prince

Women's singles
- Highest ranking: No. 74 (1 July 2020)
- Current ranking: No. 142 (1 September 2024)
Medal record
Women's squash
Representing Malaysia
Southeast Asian Games
Gold medal – first place	2019 Philippines	Team
- Updated on 1 September 2024

Wen Li Lai (born 28 May 2000), also known as Lai Wen Li, is a Malaysian professional Squash player. She achieved her career-best ranking of World No. 74 in July 2020. She has competed in the main draw of multiple professional PSA tournaments. She won the 2019 NZ International Squash Classic.
