= Ong Sai Hung =

Malaysian squash player (born 1999)

Personal information
- Born: 21 February 1999 (age 27) Perlis, Malaysia
- Height: 170 cm (5 ft 7 in)
- Weight: 59 kg (130 lb)

Sport
- Country: Malaysia
- Coached by: Andrew Cross
- Retired: Active
- Racquet used: Prince, Dunlop

Men's singles
- Highest ranking: No. 174 (October 2019)
- Current ranking: No. 174 (October 2019)
Medal record
Men's squash
Representing Malaysia
Southeast Asian Games
Gold medal – first place	2019 Philippines	Team

Chinese name
- Traditional Chinese: 王世鴻
- Simplified Chinese: 王世鸿
Transcriptions
Standard Mandarin
- Hanyu Pinyin: Wáng Shìhóng
Yue: Cantonese
- Jyutping: Wong4 Sai3 Hung4
Southern Min
- Hokkien POJ: Ông Sèhông
- Updated on October 2019

Ong Sai Hung (born 21 February 1999 in Perlis) is a Malaysian professional squash player. He attended SJK(C) Chung Hwa Jitra. As of October 2019, he was ranked number 174 in the world. He has competed in the main draw of multiple professional PSA tournaments. He has represented Malaysia internationally.
