= Darren Pragasam =

Malaysian squash player (born 1999)

Personal information
- Born: 27 August 1999 (age 26) Seremban, Malaysia

Sport
- Country: Malaysia
- Retired: Active
- Highest ranking: No. 93 (May 2022)
- Current ranking: No. 121 (October 2025)
- Title: 5
Medal record
Men's squash
Representing Malaysia
Southeast Asian Games
Gold medal – first place	2019 Philippines	Team
Bronze medal – third place	2019 Philippines	Singles

Darren Rahul Pragasam (born 27 August 1999) is a Malaysian professional squash player. He reached a career high ranking of 93 in the world during May 2022.

== Biography ==
In June 2025, he won his 4th PSA title after securing victory in the Western Australia Open during the 2024–25 PSA Squash Tour. In October 2025, he won his 5th PSA title after securing victory in the Philippine Challenger Classic during the 2025–26 PSA Squash Tour.
