= Gymnastics at the 2019 SEA Games =

- Venue: Rizal Memorial Coliseum
- Location: Manila, Philippines
- Date: 1–9 December

The gymnastics competitions at the 2019 SEA Games in the Philippines was held at the Rizal Memorial Coliseum from 1 to 9 December 2019.

== Schedule ==
The following is the schedule for the gymnastics competitions. All times are Philippine Standard Time (UTC+8).

Artistic

Date	Time	Event	Phase
1 December 2019	14:00	Men's floor	Qualification
1 December 2019	14:00	Men's pommel horse	Qualification
1 December 2019	14:00	Men's rings	Qualification
1 December 2019	14:00	Men's vault	Qualification
1 December 2019	14:00	Men's parallel bars	Qualification
1 December 2019	14:00	Men's horizontal bar	Qualification
1 December 2019	14:00	Men's all around	Final
2 December 2019	14:00	Women's vault	Qualification
2 December 2019	14:00	Women's uneven bars	Qualification
2 December 2019	14:00	Women's balance beam	Qualification
2 December 2019	14:00	Women's floor	Qualification
2 December 2019	14:00	Women's all around	Final
3 December 2019	16:00	Men's floor	Final
3 December 2019	16:30	Women's vault	Final
3 December 2019	17:30	Men's pommel horse	Final
3 December 2019	18:00	Women's uneven bars	Final
3 December 2019	18:30	Men's rings	Final
4 December 2019	16:00	Men's vault	Final
4 December 2019	16:30	Women's balance beam	Final
4 December 2019	17:30	Men's parallel bars	Final
4 December 2019	18:00	Women's floor	Final
4 December 2019	18:30	Men's horizontal bar	Final

Rhythmic

Date	Time	Event	Phase
6 December 2019	10:00	Hoop	Qualification
6 December 2019	11:05	Ball	Qualification
6 December 2019	12:10	Clubs	Qualification
6 December 2019	13:15	Ribbon	Qualification
7 December 2019	10:00	Hoop	Final
7 December 2019	10:30	Ball	Final
7 December 2019	11:00	Clubs	Final
7 December 2019	11:30	Ribbon	Final
7 December 2019	14:00	Group all-around	Final

Aerobic

Date	Time	Event	Phase
9 December 2019	10:10	Women's individual	Final
9 December 2019	13:00	Mixed pairs	Final
9 December 2019	14:30	Mixed trio	Final

== Medal summary ==
* Host nation (Philippines)

Rank	Nation	Gold	Silver	Bronze	Total
1	Malaysia	9	3	4	16
2	Vietnam	6	2	7	15
3	Philippines*	3	5	4	12
4	Indonesia	2	4	2	8
5	Thailand	1	5	2	8
6	Singapore	0	0	1	1
Totals (6 entries)		21	19	20	60

== Medalists ==
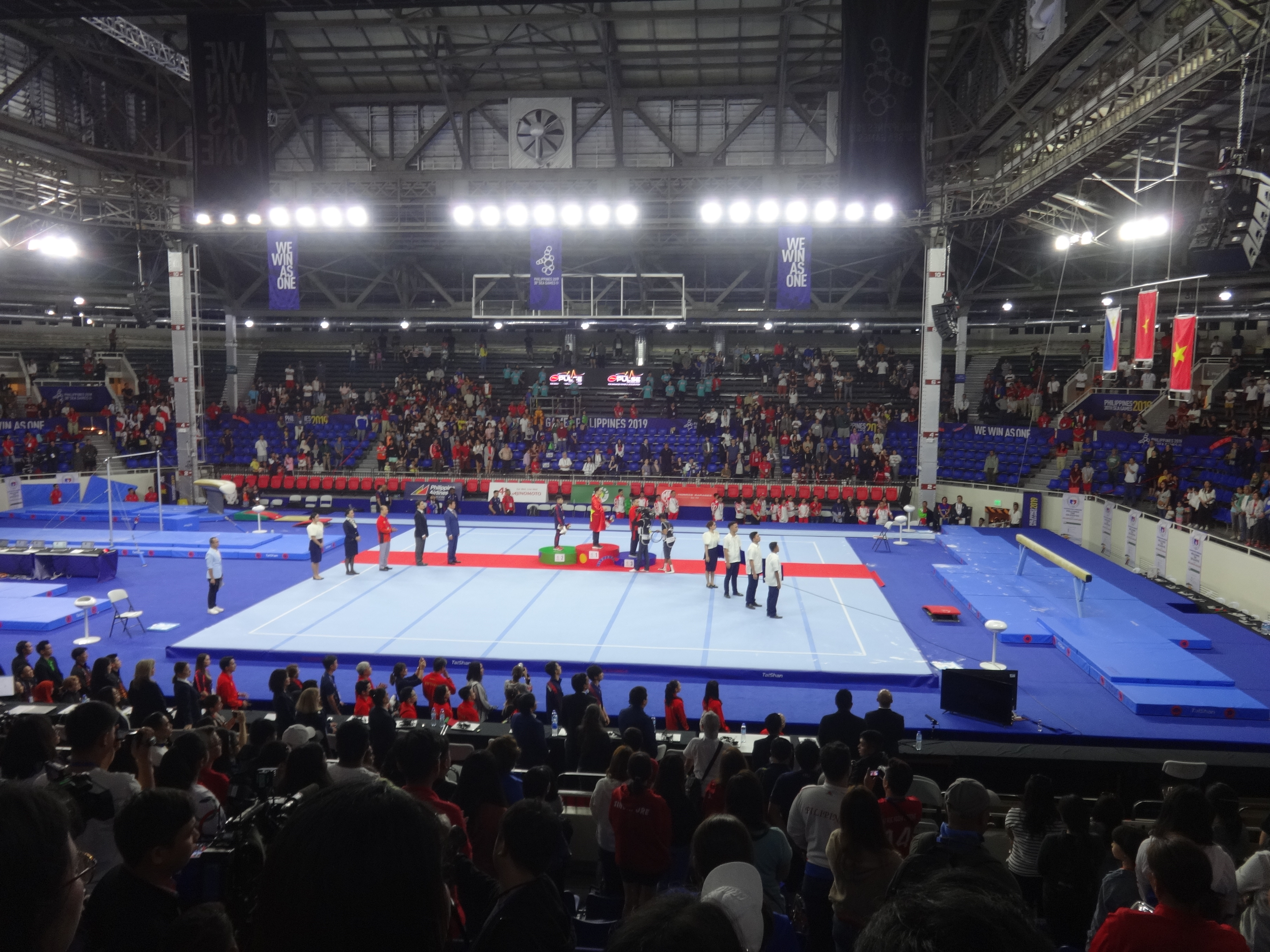
The Rizal Memorial Coliseum during the awarding of the medalists

=== Aerobic ===
Event	Gold	Silver	Bronze
Women's individual	Trần Ngọc Thúy Vi; Vietnam	Chawisa Intakul; Thailand	Charmaine Dolar; Philippines
Mixed pair	Vietnam; Phan Thế Gia Hiển; Bùi Minh Phương	Thailand; Peerapong Potjanakosee; Chawisa Intakul	Indonesia; Denda Firmansyah; Umi Sri Haryani
Mixed trio	Vietnam; Nguyễn Việt Anh; Vương Hoài Ân; Nguyễn Chế Thanh	Indonesia; Aprilian Anggara; Muhammad Angger Setiawan; Muhammad Angger Dharmawan	Thailand; Chanawit Thongdee; Supatsorn Watcharaporn; Irada Pantao

=== Artistic ===
==== Men ====
Event	Gold	Silver	Bronze
All-around	Carlos Yulo; Philippines	Đinh Phương Thành; Vietnam	Lê Thanh Tùng; Vietnam
Floor	Carlos Yulo; Philippines	Tikumporn Surintornta; Thailand	Zul Bahrin Mat Asri; Malaysia
Pommel horse	Tan Fu Jie; Malaysia	Carlos Yulo; Philippines	Đinh Phương Thành; Vietnam
Rings	Đặng Nam; Vietnam	Carlos Yulo; Philippines	Dwi Arifin; Indonesia
Vault	Agus Adi Prayoko; Indonesia	Carlos Yulo; Philippines	Lê Thanh Tùng; Vietnam
Parallel bars	Đinh Phương Thành; Vietnam	Carlos Yulo; Philippines	Lê Thanh Tùng; Vietnam
Horizontal bar	Đinh Phương Thành; Vietnam	Carlos Yulo; Philippines	Sean Yeo Xong; Singapore

==== Women ====
Event	Gold	Silver	Bronze
All-around	Farah Ann Abdul Hadi; Malaysia	Rifda Irfanaluthfi; Indonesia	Tan Ing Yueh; Malaysia
Vault	Rifda Irfanaluthfi; Indonesia	Tan Ing Yueh; Malaysia	Đỗ Thị Vân Anh; Vietnam
Uneven bars	Farah Ann Abdul Hadi; Malaysia	Đỗ Thị Ngọc Hương; Vietnam	Rachel Yeoh Li Wen; Malaysia
Balance beam	Tracie Ang; Malaysia	Rifda Irfanaluthfi; Indonesia	Đỗ Thị Vân Anh; Vietnam
Floor	Farah Ann Abdul Hadi; Malaysia	Rifda Irfanaluthfi; Indonesia	Trần Đoàn Quỳnh Nam; Vietnam

=== Rhythmic ===
Event	Gold	Silver	Bronze
Group all-around	Malaysia; Chan Mei Thung; Eu Jia Xin; Koh Jei Yi; Lee Xin Yao; Lim Chyi Ean; Shak Yuki	Thailand; Manatsanan Chaiteerapattarapong; Pornnutcha Jedthumrong; Pornchanit Junthabud; Chutikan Piwpong; Panjarat Prawatyotin; Puntita Thongsong	Philippines; Jean Caluscusin; Andrea Mae Emperado; Katrina Loretizo; AJ Melgar; Devina Sembrano
Hoop	Daniela Reggie Dela Pisa; Philippines	Izzah Amzan; Malaysia	Amy Kwan; Malaysia
Ball	Izzah Amzan; Malaysia	Nat Kulsanawong; Thailand	Daniela Reggie Dela Pisa; Philippines
Clubs	Benjaporn Limpanich; Thailand	Koi Sie Yan; Malaysia	Daniela Reggie Dela Pisa; Philippines
Ribbon	Koi Sie Yan; Malaysia; Izzah Amzan; Malaysia	None awarded	Nat Kulsanawong; Thailand
