= Rizal Memorial Coliseum =

Public indoor arena in Manila, Philippines

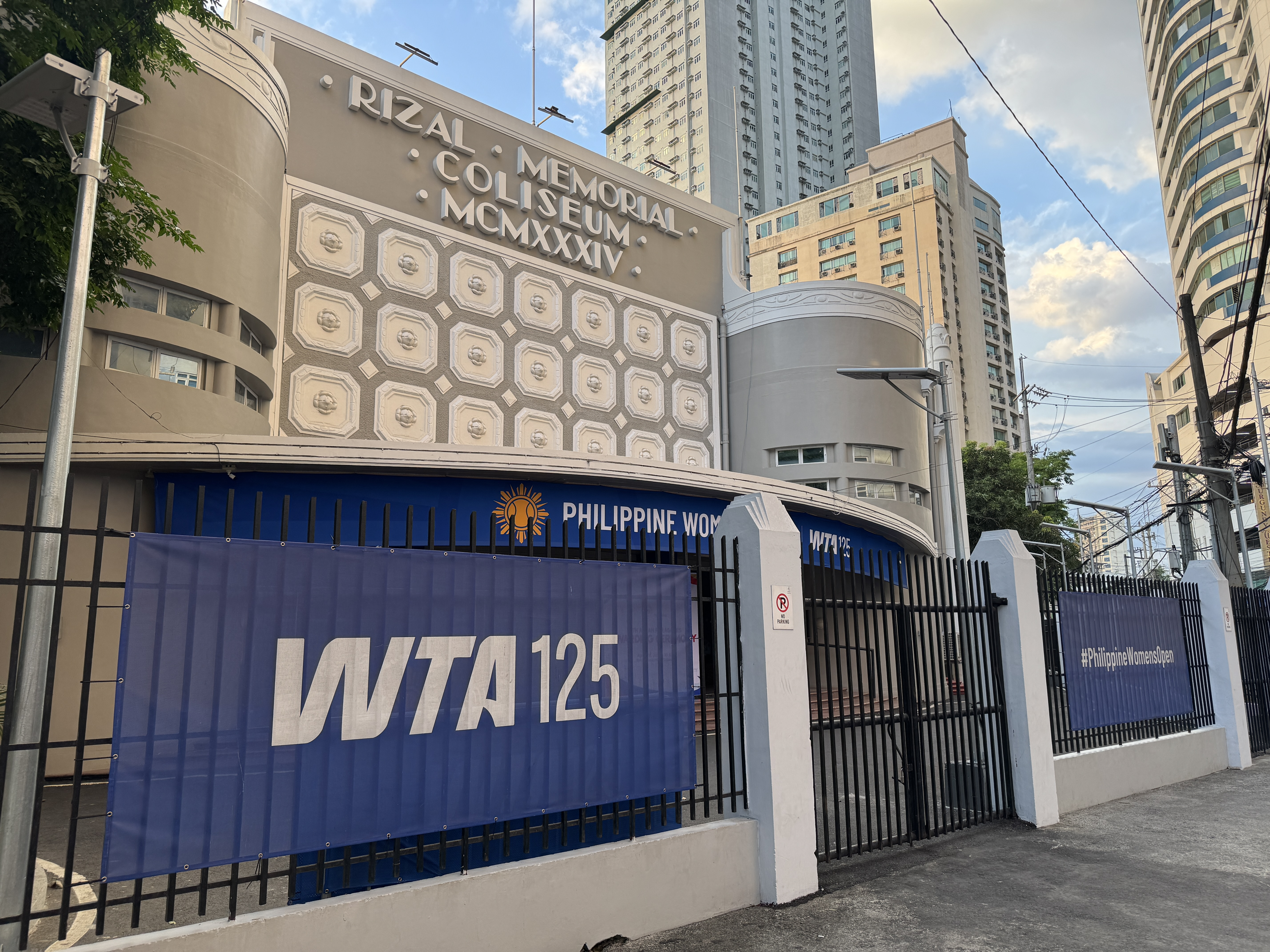
- Rizal Memorial Coliseum in 2026
- Interactive map of Rizal Memorial Coliseum
- Former names: Rizal Memorial Tennis Stadium
- Location: Manila, Philippines
- Coordinates: 14°33′44″N 120°59′38″E
- Owner: City Government of Manila
- Operator: Philippine Sports Commission
- Capacity: 6,100
- Public transit: Vito Cruz; 5 6 7 14 17 23 24 25 27 34 38 40 42 48 49 53 P. Ocampo

Construction
- Opened: 1934
- Renovated: 1953, 1981, 1991, 2005, 2019
- Architect: Juan Arellano

Tenants
- Philippines women's national basketball team Philippines women's national volleyball team MICAA (1938–1981); UAAP (1938–2002); NCAA (1938–2006, 2025–present); PBA (1975–1982, 2024–present); Manila Metrostars (MBA) (1998); Manila Batang Quiapo (MPBL) (2025–present)

The Rizal Memorial Coliseum is an indoor arena in the Rizal Memorial Sports Complex in Manila, Philippines. It can hold up to 6,100 people.

== History ==
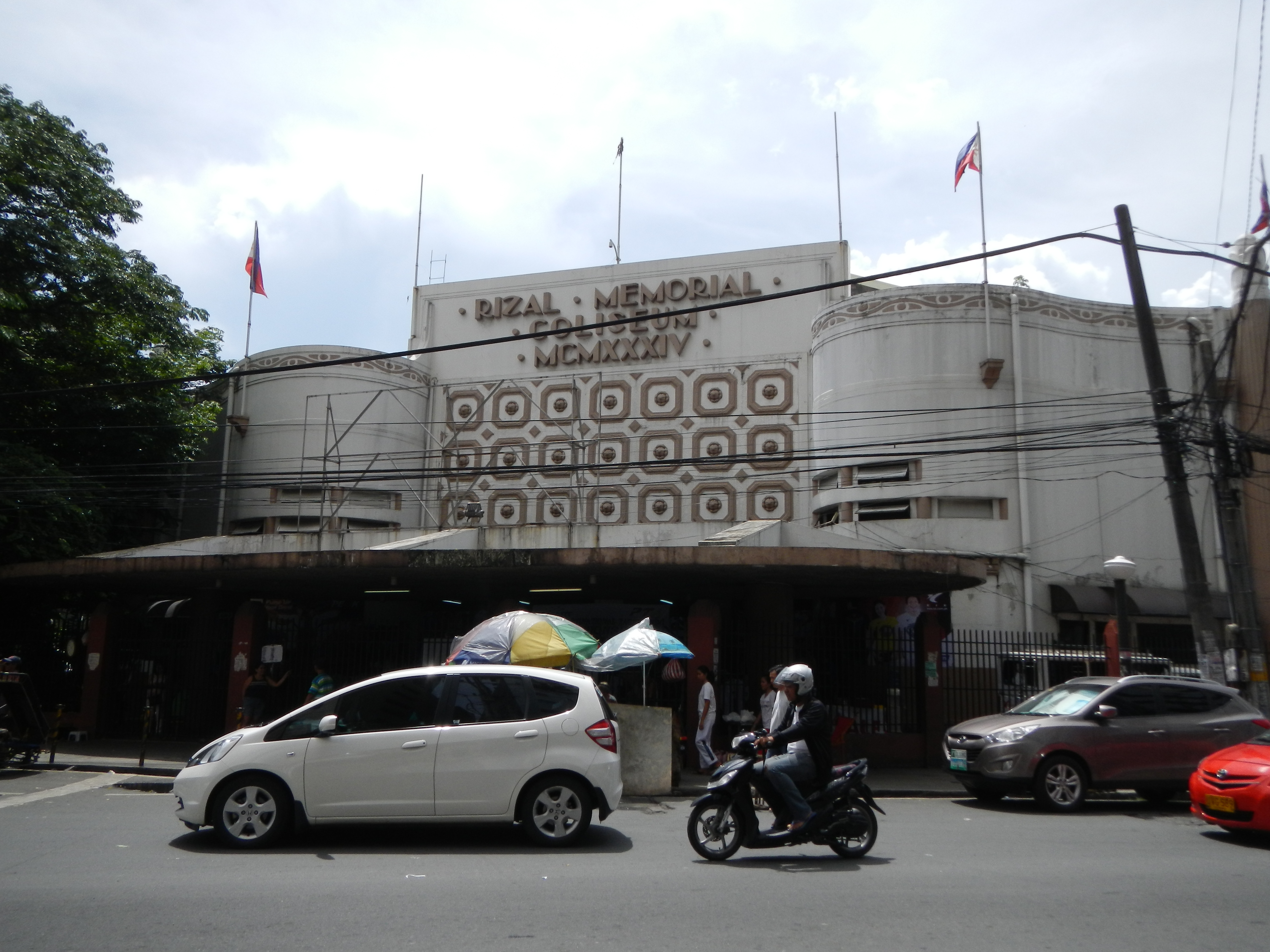
The Rizal Memorial Coliseum prior to the 2019 renovation. c. 2013

The Rizal Memorial Coliseum within the Rizal Memorial Sports Complex was built on the former site of Manila Carnival Grounds in 1934 as a tennis stadium named "Rizal Memorial Tennis Stadium", but was later renamed “Rizal Memorial Coliseum” at an unknown time. It became a primary venue for the UAAP and the NCAA, before moving to much-larger venues such as the Araneta Coliseum. It was one of the buildings that were destroyed during the Battle of Manila of World War II in 1945 and was reconstructed in 1953 for the 1954 Asian Games. It was also one of the venues of now-defunct Metropolitan Basketball Association (MBA) as the home court of the Manila Metrostars during the inaugural season in 1998.

=== 2016–17 demolition plan ===
Around 2016, there were reportedly plans to demolish the Rizal Memorial Coliseum. The Philippine Sports Commission (PSC) announced proposals to convert the venue to a museum building to house the Philippine Sports Museum and the Asian Games Museum in January 2016. In November 2016, then-Manila Mayor Joseph Estrada announced that the city government is making a partnership with businessman Enrique Razon to convert the Rizal Memorial Sports Complex (which includes a coliseum) into a commercial center which will include a mall and cinemas. The sports museum plan to convert the Rizal Memorial Coliseum is included. The plan was criticized by various heritage and athletes groups. The National Commission for Culture and the Arts also stated that the Estrada local government never consulted the agency regarding the sports venue conversion plan. Estrada defended the redevelopment of the RMSC, said that no one uses the complex anymore and it became old, and antiquated.

In April 2017, the sports complex was declared as a National Historical Landmark by the National Historical Commission of the Philippines and an Important Cultural Property by the National Museum of the Philippines ensuring the site's preservation due to the National Cultural Heritage Act. Consequentially the Razon group later abandoned its plans to redevelop the site and the PSC halted its negotiations with the Manila city government on the planned sale of RMSC. On August 7, 2019, both the PSC and the Manila City government (now under the administration of Mayor Isko Moreno) agreed to not selling the complex.

=== 2019 renovation ===
The venue was renovated ahead for its use for the 2019 SEA Games. Renovation work began on July 8, 2019, ME Sicat Construction is the contractor for the renovation project which secured its role through bidding. The renovation process includes near restoration of the building to its state in the 1930s installing new facilities including the coliseum's first ever air conditioning system while keeping the original look of the building designed by Juan Arellano. Gerard Lico and his team used the archival materials by the collectors to restore its original design including from Jorge B. Vargas. The facade of the building was reverted to its gray color. The renovation made its capacity decreased from 8,000 to only 6,100. After only four months, the renovation was completed on November 27, 2019. The coliseum hosted the gymnastics competitions during the biennial games.

=== 2026 renovation plan ===
In February 2026, the PSC announced plans to convert the Rizal Memorial Coliseum back into a tennis-dedicated venue.

== Architecture and design ==
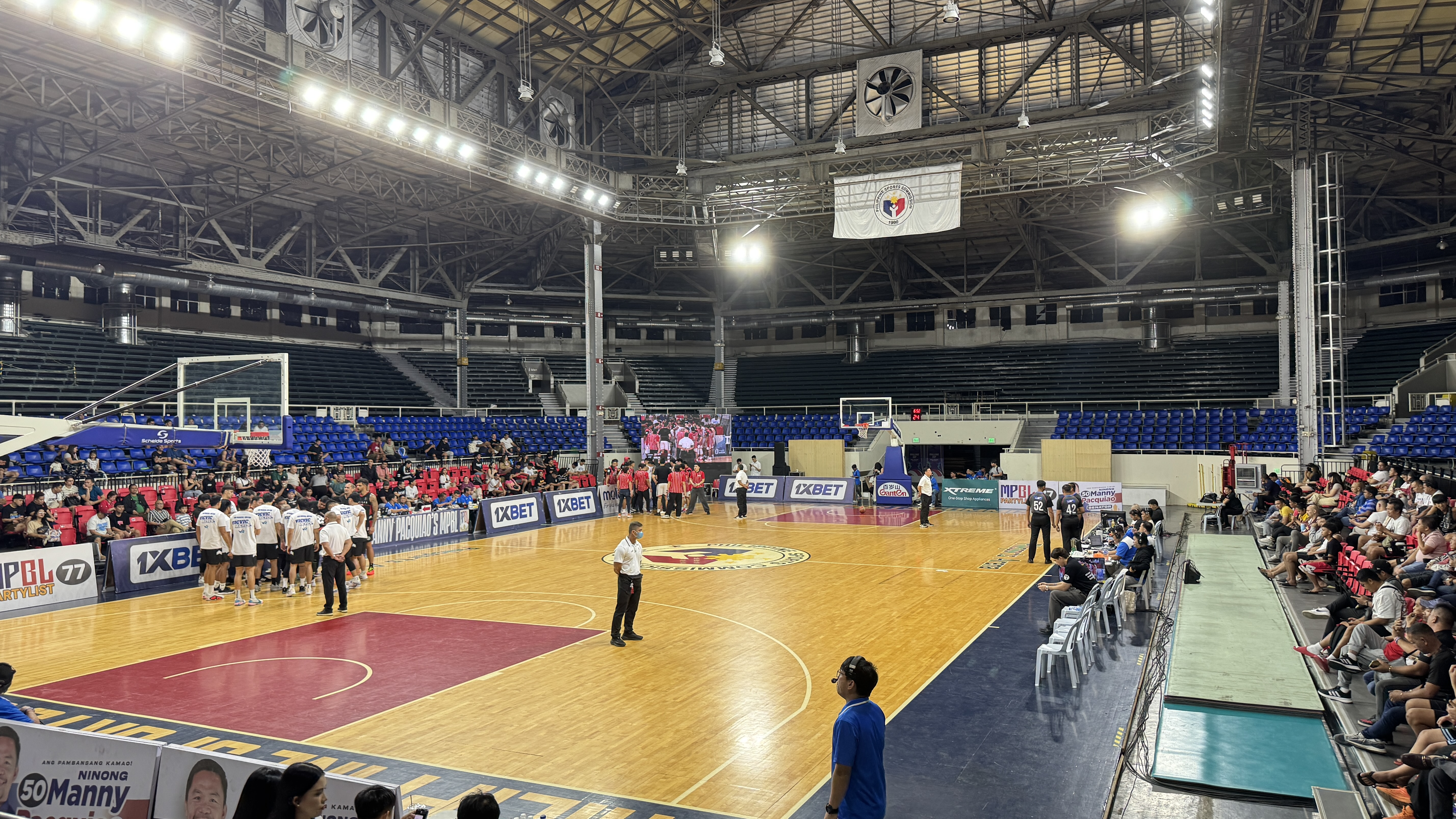
Rizal Memorial Coliseum during a Maharlika Pilipinas Basketball League (MPBL) game in 2025

Juan Arellano was the architect responsible for the design of the Rizal Memorial Sports Complex including the Rizal Memorial Coliseum. The Rizal Memorial Coliseum exhibits an Art Deco style architecture, particularly Streamline Moderne.

== See also ==
- Rizal Memorial Sports Complex
- Rizal Memorial Stadium
- Rizal Memorial Baseball Stadium
- Ninoy Aquino Stadium
- PhilSports Arena
- Smart Araneta Coliseum
- Mall of Asia Arena
- Philippine Arena
