= Brunei at the 2019 SEA Games =

Brunei at the 2019 Southeast Asian Games
- IOC code: BRU
- NOC: Brunei Darussalam National Olympic Council
- Website: www.bruneiolympic.org (in English)

in the Philippines
- Medals Ranked 9th: Gold 2 Silver 5 Bronze 6 Total 13

Southeast Asian Games appearances (overview)
- 1977; 1979; 1981; 1983; 1985; 1987; 1989; 1991; 1993; 1995; 1997; 1999; 2001; 2003; 2005; 2007; 2009; 2011; 2013; 2015; 2017; 2019; 2021; 2023; 2025; 2027; 2029

Brunei competed in the 2019 Southeast Asian Games in the Philippines.

== Medal summary ==
=== Medal by sport ===
Medals by sport
Sport	1st place, gold medalist(s)	2nd place, silver medalist(s)	3rd place, bronze medalist(s)	Total
Karate	0	0	1	1
Lawn Bowls	0	2	0	2
Netball	0	0	1	1
Polo	1	0	1	2
Pencak Silat	0	0	1	1
Wushu	1	3	2	6
Total	2	5	6	13

=== Medal by date ===
Medals by date
Day	Date	1st place, gold medalist(s)	2nd place, silver medalist(s)	3rd place, bronze medalist(s)	Total
1	1 December	0	2	1	3
2	2 December	1	1	2	4
3	3 December	0	1	2	3
4	4 December	0	1	0	1
5	9 December	1	0	1	1
Total		2	5	6	13

== Medalists ==
Medal	Name	Sport	Event
Gold	Jefri Bolkiah; Huzaimi Haji Mahari; Idris Sirat; Muhammad Farid Abdullah	Polo	B Division: 0–2 goals
Gold	Mohammad Adi Salihin	Wushu	Men's taolu nandao/nangun combine
Silver	Hosea Wong Zheng Yu	Wushu	Men's taolu taijiquan
Silver	Basma Lachkar	Wushu	Women's taolu taijiquan
Silver	Amalia Matali; Esmawandy Brahim	Lawn Bowls	Women's pairs
Silver	Joel Majallah Sain Majdurano; Mohd Safiee Shayferan bin Roslan	Wushu	Men's taolu duilian
Silver	Bahren Abdul Rahman; Mohd Hazmi Hj Idris; Hj Amli Hj Gafar	Lawn Bowls	Men's fours
Bronze	YTM PS DPM Abdul Mateen; YTM PS PAP Azemah Ni'matul Bolkiah; Huzaimi Haji Mahari; Bahar Jefri Bolkiah	Polo	A Division: 4–6 goals
Bronze	Hosea Wong Zheng Yu	Wushu	Men's taolu taijijian
Bronze	Brunei Women's Netball Team	Netball	Women's team
Bronze	Basma Lachkar	Wushu	Women's taolu taijijian
Bronze	Anisah Najihah	Pencak Silat	Women's singles seni tunggal
Bronze	Mohd Sofian Muhd Sufizan	Karate	Men's kumite 67 kg
