= Brunei at the 2026 Asian Games =

- IOC code: BRU
- NOC: Brunei Darussalam National Olympic Council

in Aichi–Nagoya, Japan 19 September – 4 October 2026
- Competitors: 6 in 2 sports
- Medals Ranked 37th: Gold 0 Silver 0 Bronze 1 Total 1

Asian Games appearances (overview)
- 1990; 1994; 1998; 2002; 2006; 2010; 2014; 2018; 2022; 2026

Brunei Darussalam competed at the 2026 Asian Games in Nagoya, Aichi Prefecture, Japan from 19 September to 4 October 2026. The country received one bronze medal, Basma Lachkar's bronze medal in the women's taijiquan & taijijian event, ranking 37th in the medal total.

== Background ==
The Asian Games-bound Brunei delegation was sent off in a flag handover ceremony at the Hassanal Bolkiah National Stadium on 14 September 2026. The delegation consisted of 12 people: six athletes and six officials. The athletes competed in karate and wushu consisting of five men and one woman.

== Competitors ==
The following is a list of the number of competitors representing Brunei that participated at the Asian Games:

| Sport | Men | Women | Total |
|---|---|---|---|
| Karate | 1 | 0 | 1 |
| Wushu | 4 | 1 | 5 |
| Total | 5 | 1 | 6 |

== Medalists ==
The following athlete from Brunei won medal at the Games.

| Medal | Name | Sport | Event | Date |
|---|---|---|---|---|
| Bronze | Basma Lachkar | Wushu | Women's taijiquan & taijijian | 20 September |

== Karate ==
| Athlete | Event | Quarterfinals | Semifinals | Repechage | Final / BM | |
| Athlete | Event | Opposition Result | Opposition Result | Opposition Result | Opposition Result | Rank |
|---|---|---|---|---|---|---|
| Ak Ahmad Munib Aiman Pg Hj Md Hasimudin | Men's –55 kg | Januar (INA); L 1–2 | Did not advance | | | |

== Wushu ==
=== Taolu ===
Men

| Athlete | Event | Event 1 | | Event 2 | | Total | Rank |
| Athlete | Event | Result | Rank | Result | Rank | Total | Rank |
|---|---|---|---|---|---|---|---|
| Walid Lachkar | Changquan | 9.493 | 14 | —N/a | | 9.493 | 14 |
| Abel Lim Wee Yuen | Nanquan & nangun | 9.653 | 12 | 9.683 | 9 | 19.336 | 10 |
| Mohammad Adi Salihin | Nanquan & nangun | 9.706 | 6 | 9.680 | 11 | 19.386 | 8 |
| Hosea Wong | Taijiquan & taijijian | 9.656 | 11 | 9.686 | 10 | 19.342 | 11 |

Women

| Athlete | Event | Event 1 | | Event 2 | | Total | Rank |
| Athlete | Event | Result | Rank | Result | Rank | Total | Rank |
|---|---|---|---|---|---|---|---|
| Basma Lachkar | Taijiquan & taijijian | 9.723 | 3 | 9.720 | 4 | 19.443 | 3rd place, bronze medalist(s) |
