= Wushu at the 2026 Asian Games – Women's taijiquan & taijijian =

Women's taijiquan & taijijian at the 2026 Asian Games
- Venue: Aichi Budokan
- Dates: 20 September 2026
- Competitors: 13 from 12 nations

Medalists
gold medal	Tong Xin	China
silver medal	Shiho Saito	Japan
bronze medal	Basma Lachkar	Brunei
bronze medal	Zeanne Law	Singapore

The women's taijiquan and taijijian competition at the 2026 Asian Games was held on 20 September 2026 at Aichi Prefectural Martial Arts Hall in Nagoya, Japan.

== Schedule ==
All times are Japan Standard Time (UTC+09:00)

Date	Time	Event
Sunday, 20 September 2026	10:08	Taijiquan
Sunday, 20 September 2026	14:30	Taijijian

== Results ==
Legend

- DNS — Did not start

Rank	Athlete	Taijiquan	Taijijian	Total
1st place, gold medalist(s)	Tong Xin (CHN)	9.770	9.783	19.553
2nd place, silver medalist(s)	Shiho Saito (JPN)	9.733	9.740	19.473
3rd place, bronze medalist(s)	Basma Lachkar (BRU)	9.723	9.720	19.443
3rd place, bronze medalist(s)	Zeanne Law (SGP)	9.720	9.723	19.443
5	Juanita Mok (HKG)	9.706	9.713	19.419
6	Mandy Cebelle Chen (MAS)	9.706	9.706	19.412
7	Vera Tan (SGP)	9.686	9.696	19.382
8	Liu Pei-hsun (TPE)	9.686	9.686	19.372
9	Lee Min-ju (KOR)	9.686	9.673	19.359
10	Agatha Wong (PHI)	9.703	9.156	18.859
11	Sabita Rai (NEP)	8.653	9.183	17.836
12	Sirinapha Horchue (THA)	8.363	8.293	16.656
—	Komal Emmanuel (PAK)			DNS
