= Wushu at the 2026 Asian Games – Men's taijiquan & taijijian =

Men's taijiquan & taijijian at the 2026 Asian Games
- Venue: Aichi Budokan
- Dates: 21 September 2026
- Competitors: 15 from 13 nations

Medalists
gold medal	Liu Dewen	China
silver medal	Sun Chia-hung	Chinese Taipei
bronze medal	An Hyeon-gi	South Korea

The men's taijiquan and taijijian at the 2026 Asian Games was held on 21 September 2026 at Aichi Prefectural Martial Arts Hall in Nagoya, Japan.

== Schedule ==
All times are Japan Standard Time (UTC+09:00)

Date	Time	Event
Monday, 21 September 2026	09:53	Taijiquan
Monday, 21 September 2026	14:30	Taijijian

== Results ==
Rank	Athlete	Taijiquan	Taijijian	Total
1st place, gold medalist(s)	Liu Dewen (CHN)	9.780	9.780	19.560
2nd place, silver medalist(s)	Sun Chia-hung (TPE)	9.733	9.720	19.453
3rd place, bronze medalist(s)	An Hyeon-gi (KOR)	9.713	9.716	19.429
4	Tomohiro Araya (JPN)	9.703	9.723	19.426
5	Tay Yu Xuan (SGP)	9.713	9.706	19.419
6	Jones Inso (PHI)	9.710	9.693	19.403
7	Rainer Reinaldy Ferdiansyah (INA)	9.706	9.690	19.396
8	Chan Jun Kai (SGP)	9.696	9.693	19.389
9	Alexander De Los Reyes (PHI)	9.696	9.676	19.372
10	Nguyễn Trọng Lâm (VIE)	9.710	9.643	19.353
11	Hosea Wong (BRU)	9.656	9.686	19.342
12	Hari Prasad Gole (NEP)	9.630	9.506	19.136
13	Yeung Chung Hei (HKG)	9.346	9.730	19.076
14	Katisak Goolsawadmongkol (THA)	9.273	9.630	18.903
15	Biplop Rudra (BAN)	9.053	9.053	18.106
