= Polo at the 2019 SEA Games =

- Venue: Miguel Romero and Iñigo Zobel Polo Fields, Calatagan, Batangas
- Date: 24 November – 9 December
- Competitors: 45 from 4 nations

The polo competitions at the 2019 Southeast Asian Games in the Philippines were held at the Miguel Romero Polo Field in Calatagan, Batangas.

== Competition schedule ==
The two polo events, 0–2 low goal and 4–6 high goal took place from 24 November to 8 December 2019. Due to Typhoon Kammuri (Tisoy) matches scheduled for 3, 4, and 6 December were postponed to 5, 6, and 8 December with the gold and bronze medal matches pushed to 9 December.

P	Preliminary	B	3rd place play-off	F	Final

Event/Date	Sun Nov 24	Mon Nov 25	Tue Nov 26	Wed Nov 27	Thu Nov 28	Fri Nov 29	Sat Nov 30	Sun Dec 1		Mon Dec 2	Tue Dec 3	Wed Dec 4	Thu Dec 5	Fri Dec 6	Sat Dec 7	Sun Dec 8	Mon Dec 9	
0–2 low goal													P	P		P	B	F
4–6 high goal	P		P		P			B	F									

== Venue ==
Polo was held in two venues: the Miguel Romero Polo Field in Calatagan, Batangas, a newly renovated venue inaugurated on 23 November 2019 which was formerly known as the Globalport Polo Field and the Iñigo Zobel Polo Field.

== Format ==
Playing rules set by the Hurlingham Polo Association were used for these polo events.

== Participating nations ==
Four nations participated in two events in polo. Each participating country was eligible to nominate 24 horses for either of the two event. Brunei brought in 45 horses in preparation for their participation while Indonesia and Malaysia opted not to bring their own horses.

- Brunei (11)
- Indonesia (7)
- Malaysia (13)
- Philippines (14)

== Squads ==
Brunei (BRU)	Indonesia (INA)	Malaysia (MAS)	Philippines (PHI)
Bahar Jefri Bolkiah; Azemah Bolkiah; Abdul Mateen; Abdul Qawi; Abdullah Muhamad; Jefri Bolkiah; Mahari Huzaimi; Husin Mohamad Huzaimi; Mohd Jaafar Abd Azeez; Khairul Alimin; Sirat Idris	Fahmi Akmal; Glendy Buyung; Acep Krisnandar; Rico Lianto; Billy Lumintang; Novel Momongan; Dwira Roring	Faizal Abu Bakar Muhammad; Fazly Ahmad Jamili Yudie; Shareizal Baseri Mohamad; Rashid Hasnan; Zekri Ibrahim Mohamad; Khan Mohamed Moiz Imran; Reismann Mohd Ismail Shaik; Azfar Mustapha; Zulhemie Nadzar Mohd; Saipulrudin Sayed Mohd Syed Ahmad; Amran Selamat; Keith Teh; Shazril Ezzani	Augustus Aguirre; Tomas Vicente Bitong; Jose Maria Augusto De Jesus; Benjamin Eusebio; Franchesca Eusebio; Enrique Filamor; Jose Ricardo Garcia; Julian Edgardo Garcia; Stefano Juban; Eduardo Miguel Lopez; Mikee Romero; Ferdinand Romualdez Jr. Noel Vecinal; Jose Antonio Veloso

== Results ==
=== 0–2 low goal ===
Pos	Team	Pld	W	D	L	GF	GA	GD	Pts	Final Result
1	Malaysia	3	3	0	0	21	10.5	+10.5	9	Advanced to Gold medal match
2	Brunei	3	2	0	1	16	13	+3	6	Advanced to Gold medal match
3	Indonesia	3	1	0	2	12	19.5	−7.5	3	Bronze medal
4	Philippines (H)	3	0	0	3	14	20	−6	0	Bronze medal

Updated to match(es) played on 6 December 2019. Source: 2019 SEA Games
(H) Hosts

==== Qualifiying league ====
Date	Division	Team 1	Team 2	Score	Venue
5 December (Note: Matches originally scheduled to be held on 3 December but was rescheduled due to Typhoon Kammuri (Tisoy).)	Division B	Indonesia	Brunei	1–8; Report	Miguel L. Romero Polo Facility
5 December	Division B	Malaysia	Philippines	6–5½; Report	Miguel L. Romero Polo Facility
6 December (Note: Matches originally scheduled to be held on 4 December but was rescheduled due to Typhoon Kammuri (Tisoy).)	Division B	Brunei	Malaysia	3–8; Report	Miguel L. Romero Polo Facility
6 December	Division B	Indonesia	Philippines	9–4½; Report	Miguel L. Romero Polo Facility
8 December (Note: Matches originally scheduled to be held on 6 December but was rescheduled due to Typhoon Kammuri (Tisoy).)	Division B	Indonesia	Malaysia	2–7; Report	Miguel L. Romero Polo Facility
8 December	Division B	Brunei	Philippines	5–4; Report	Miguel L. Romero Polo Facility

==== Final round ====
===== Final =====
Date	Team 1	Team 2	Score	Venue
9 December (Note: Matches originally scheduled to be held on 8 December but was rescheduled due to Typhoon Kammuri (Tisoy).)	Malaysia	Brunei	4–7; Report	Miguel L. Romero Polo Facility

=== 4–6 high goal ===
Pos	Team	Pld	W	D	L	GF	GA	GD	Pts	Final Result
1	Philippines (H)	3	2	0	1	22.5	18	+4.5	6	Advanced to Gold medal match
2	Malaysia	3	2	0	1	24	21.5	+2.5	6	Advanced to Gold medal match
3	Brunei	3	2	0	1	21	20	+1	6	Advanced to Bronze medal match
4	Indonesia	3	0	0	3	16	24	−8	0	Advanced to Bronze medal match

Source: 2019 SEA Games
(H) Hosts

==== Qualifiying league ====
Date	Division	Team 1	Team 2	Score	Venue
24 November	Division A	Philippines	Brunei	8 – 8½; Report	Iñigo Zobel Polo Field
24 November	Division A	Indonesia	Malaysia	7½ – 11; Report	Iñigo Zobel Polo Field
26 November	Division A	Brunei	Indonesia	7 – 4 Report	Iñigo Zobel Polo Field
26 November	Division A	Philippines	Malaysia	8½ – 5 Report	Iñigo Zobel Polo Field
28 November	Division A	Philippines	Indonesia	6 – 4½; Report	Iñigo Zobel Polo Field
28 November	Division A	Brunei	Malaysia	5½ – 8 Report	Iñigo Zobel Polo Field

==== Final round ====
===== Bronze medal game =====
Date	Team 1	Team 2	Score	Venue
1 December	Brunei	Indonesia	5–4; Report	Iñigo Zobel Polo Field

===== Final =====
Date	Team 1	Team 2	Score	Venue
1 December	Philippines	Malaysia	5½–7; Report	Iñigo Zobel Polo Field

== Medalists ==
Event	Gold	Silver	Bronze
0–2 low goal	Brunei; Jefri Bolkiah; Huzaimi Haji Mahari; Idris Sirat; Muhammad Farid Abdullah	Malaysia; Rashid Hasnan; Imran Khan Mohd Moiz; Keith Teh; Mohd Zulhelmie Nadzar	Indonesia; Billy Lumintang; Rico Lianto; Glendy Buyung; Acep Krisnandar
0–2 low goal	Brunei; Jefri Bolkiah; Huzaimi Haji Mahari; Idris Sirat; Muhammad Farid Abdullah	Malaysia; Rashid Hasnan; Imran Khan Mohd Moiz; Keith Teh; Mohd Zulhelmie Nadzar	Philippines; Mikee Romero; Antonio Jose; Stefano Juban; Benjamin Eusebio
4–6 high goal	Malaysia; Amran Selamat; Tengku Ahmad Shazril Ezzani; Rashid Hasnan; Syed Ahmad Saipulrudin	Philippines; Tomas Vicente Bitong; Stefano Juban; Eduardo Miguel Lopez; Augustus Aguirre	Brunei; Abdul Mateen; Huzaimi Haji Mahari; Azemah Bolkiah; Bahar Jefri Bolkiah
