= Wushu at the 2023 SEA Games =

- Venue: Chroy Changvar Convention Centre
- Location: Phnom Penh, Cambodia
- Dates: 10–12 May 2023

Wushu events at the 2023 SEA Games took place at Chroy Changvar Convention Centre in Phnom Penh, Cambodia from 10–12 May 2023. Medals were awarded in 22 events in two categories, Taolu (choreographed routines) and Sanda (full-contact combat).

== Medal table ==
* Host nation (Cambodia)

Rank	Nation	Gold	Silver	Bronze	Total
1	Indonesia	6	6	2	14
2	Vietnam	6	3	2	11
3	Singapore	2	3	1	6
4	Malaysia	2	2	6	10
5	Brunei	2	0	2	4
6	Cambodia*	1	3	3	7
6	Myanmar	1	3	3	7
8	Philippines	1	1	4	6
9	Thailand	1	1	2	4
10	Laos	0	0	3	3
Totals (10 entries)		22	22	28	72

== Medalists ==
=== Men's taolu ===
Event	Gold	Silver	Bronze
Changquan	Edgar Xavier Marvelo; Indonesia	Jowen Lim; Singapore	Wong Weng Son; Malaysia
Daoshu / Gunshu	Jowen Lim; Singapore	Edgar Xavier Marvelo; Indonesia	Seraf Naro Siregar; Indonesia
Jianshu / Qiangshu	Muhammad Daffa Golden Boy; Indonesia	Wong Weng Son; Malaysia	Sandrex Gainsan; Philippines
Nanquan	Mohammad Adi Salihin Roslan; Brunei	Harris Horatius; Indonesia	Nông Văn Hữu; Vietnam
Nandao / Nangun	Nông Văn Hữu; Vietnam	Harris Horatius; Indonesia	Pitaya Yangrungrawin; Thailand
Taijiquan / Taijijian	Hosea Wong Zheng Yu; Brunei	Tay Yu Xuan; Singapore	Tan Zhi Yan; Malaysia
Duilian	Thailand; Pitaya Yangrungrawin; Sujinda Yangrungrawin; Wanchai Yodyinghathaikun	Cambodia; Chea Dara; Ching Vireak; Hem Bot	Brunei; Abel Lim Wee Yuen; Majdurano Joel Majallah Sain

=== Men's sanda ===
Event	Gold	Silver	Bronze
52 kg	Laksmana Pandu Pratama; Indonesia	Armen Pangchai; Thailand	Russel Camacho Diaz; Philippines
52 kg	Laksmana Pandu Pratama; Indonesia	Armen Pangchai; Thailand	Chantakhop Cantha; Laos
56 kg	Bintang Reindra Nada Guitara; Indonesia	Đỗ Huy Hoàng; Vietnam	Carlos Fernandez Baylon; Philippines
56 kg	Bintang Reindra Nada Guitara; Indonesia	Đỗ Huy Hoàng; Vietnam	Mao Muychantharith; Cambodia
60 kg	Bùi Trường Giang; Vietnam	Gideon Fred Padua Wayan; Philippines	Bayu Raka Putra; Indonesia
60 kg	Bùi Trường Giang; Vietnam	Gideon Fred Padua Wayan; Philippines	Samuel Yeo Boon Leng; Malaysia
65 kg	Trương Văn Chương; Vietnam	Samuel Marbun; Indonesia	Beng Rathana; Cambodia
65 kg	Trương Văn Chương; Vietnam	Samuel Marbun; Indonesia	Chanachai Kamolklang; Thailand
70 kg	Đinh Văn Bí; Vietnam	Chhuon Bunthai; Cambodia	Vicky Hwa Chang; Malaysia
70 kg	Đinh Văn Bí; Vietnam	Chhuon Bunthai; Cambodia	Nay Win Htut; Myanmar

=== Women's taolu ===
Event	Gold	Silver	Bronze
Changquan	Sandi Oo; Myanmar	Eugenia Diva Widodo; Indonesia	Pang Pui Yee; Malaysia
Daoshu / Gunshu	Kimberly Ong; Singapore	Zoe Tan Ziyi; Singapore	Hoàng Thị Phương Giang; Vietnam
Jianshu / Qiangshu	Dương Thúy Vi; Vietnam	Sandi Oo; Myanmar	Pang Pui Yee; Malaysia
Nanquan	Tan Cheong Min; Malaysia	Tasya Ayu Puspa Dewi; Indonesia	Aye Thitsar Myint; Myanmar
Nandao / Nangun	Tan Cheong Min; Malaysia	Phan Thị Thu Bình; Vietnam	Aye Thitsar Myint; Myanmar
Taijiquan / Taijijian	Agatha Wong; Philippines	Sydney Chin; Malaysia	Basma Lachkar; Brunei
Duilian	Cambodia; Chin Sros; Tin Bopha; Vy Sreyleak	Myanmar; Aye Thitsar Myint; Sandi Oo	Singapore; Kimberly Ong; Zeanne Law Zhi Ning; Zoe Tan Ziyi

=== Women's sanda ===
Event	Gold	Silver	Bronze
45 kg	Rosa Beatrice Malau; Indonesia	Sam Mary; Cambodia	Fineny Aukkhasone; Laos
48 kg	Nguyễn Thị Lan; Vietnam	Cherry Tan; Myanmar	Alisa Xaiyasit; Laos
48 kg	Nguyễn Thị Lan; Vietnam	Cherry Tan; Myanmar	Jenifer Kilapio; Philippines
52 kg	Tharisa Dea Florentina; Indonesia	Nguyễn Thị Giang; Vietnam	Phatt Dany; Cambodia
