= Typhoon Koto =

Pacific typhoon in 2025

Typhoon Koto (Verbena)
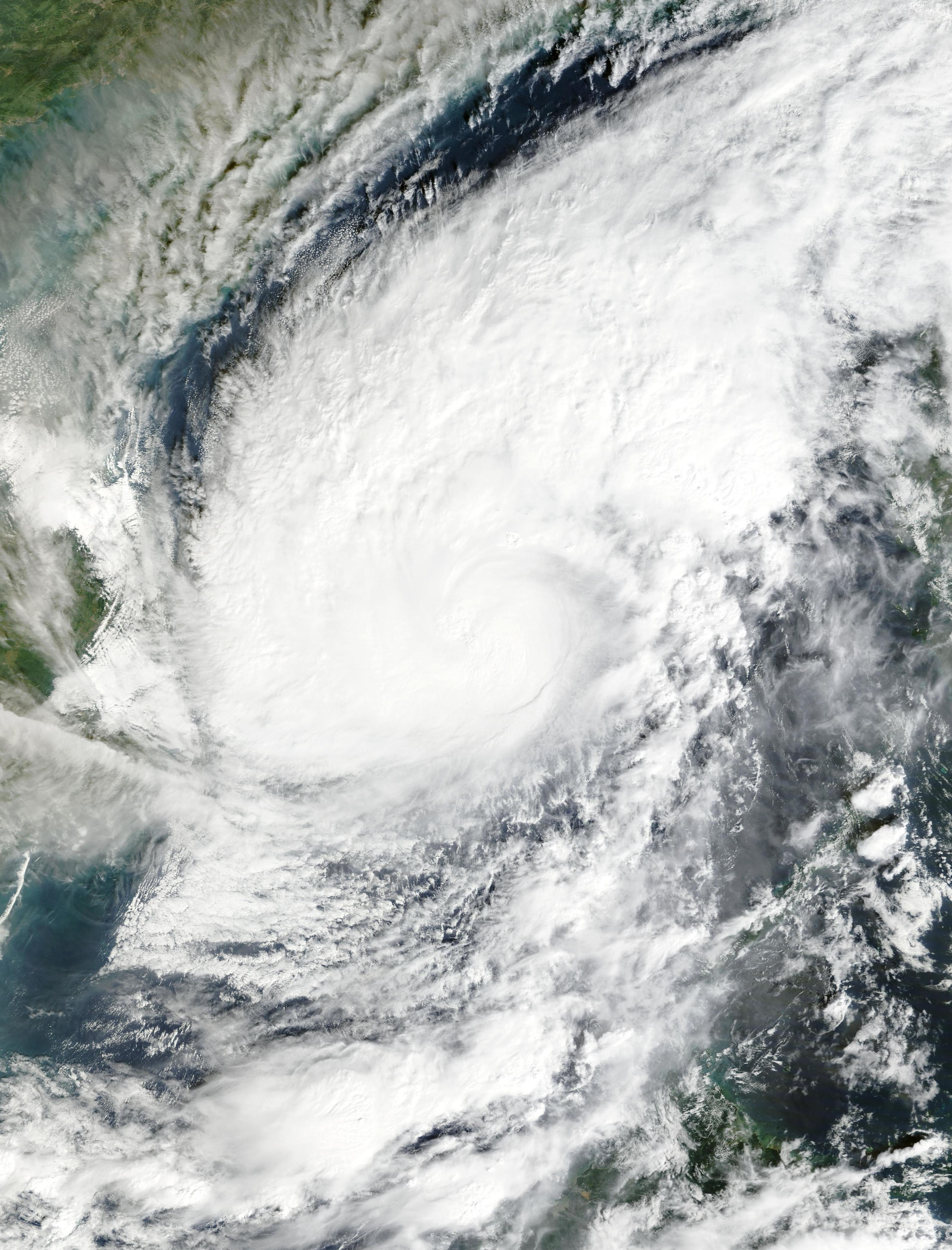
- Koto at its peak intensity over the South China Sea on November 27

Meteorological history
- Formed: November 23, 2025
- Remnant low: December 2, 2025
- Dissipated: December 3, 2025

Typhoon
- 10-minute sustained (JMA)
- Highest winds: 130 km/h (80 mph)
- Lowest pressure: 970 hPa (mbar); 28.64 inHg

Category 2-equivalent typhoon
- 1-minute sustained (SSHWS/JTWC)
- Highest winds: 155 km/h (100 mph)
- Lowest pressure: 970 hPa (mbar); 28.64 inHg

Overall effects
- Fatalities: 2
- Missing: 2
- Damage: $9.6 million (2025 USD)
- Areas affected: Philippines, Vietnam
- Part of the 2025 Pacific typhoon season

Typhoon Koto, (Note: The name Koto was contributed by Japan (Japanese: コト, [ko̞to̞]) and refers to the constellation Lyra, the harp, in Japanese.) known in the Philippines as Severe Tropical Storm Verbena, was a fairly strong and erratic tropical cyclone that impacted much of the Visayas and portions of Luzon and Mindanao in the Philippines in late November 2025. Koto was the twenty-seventh and last named storm and thirteenth typhoon of the 2025 Pacific typhoon season, Koto developed off the eastern coast of Mindanao on November 23, then tracked westward across the country, making seven landfalls before emerging over the South China Sea, where it strengthened into a typhoon. However, the system gradually weakened and became virtually stationary off the coast of Vietnam before fully dissipating on December 3.

In the Philippines, Koto, together with the prevailing shear line, triggered flooding and landslides in the Visayas region that left two people missing, compounding the impacts from the recent Typhoons Kalmaegi and Fung-wong.

== Meteorological history ==
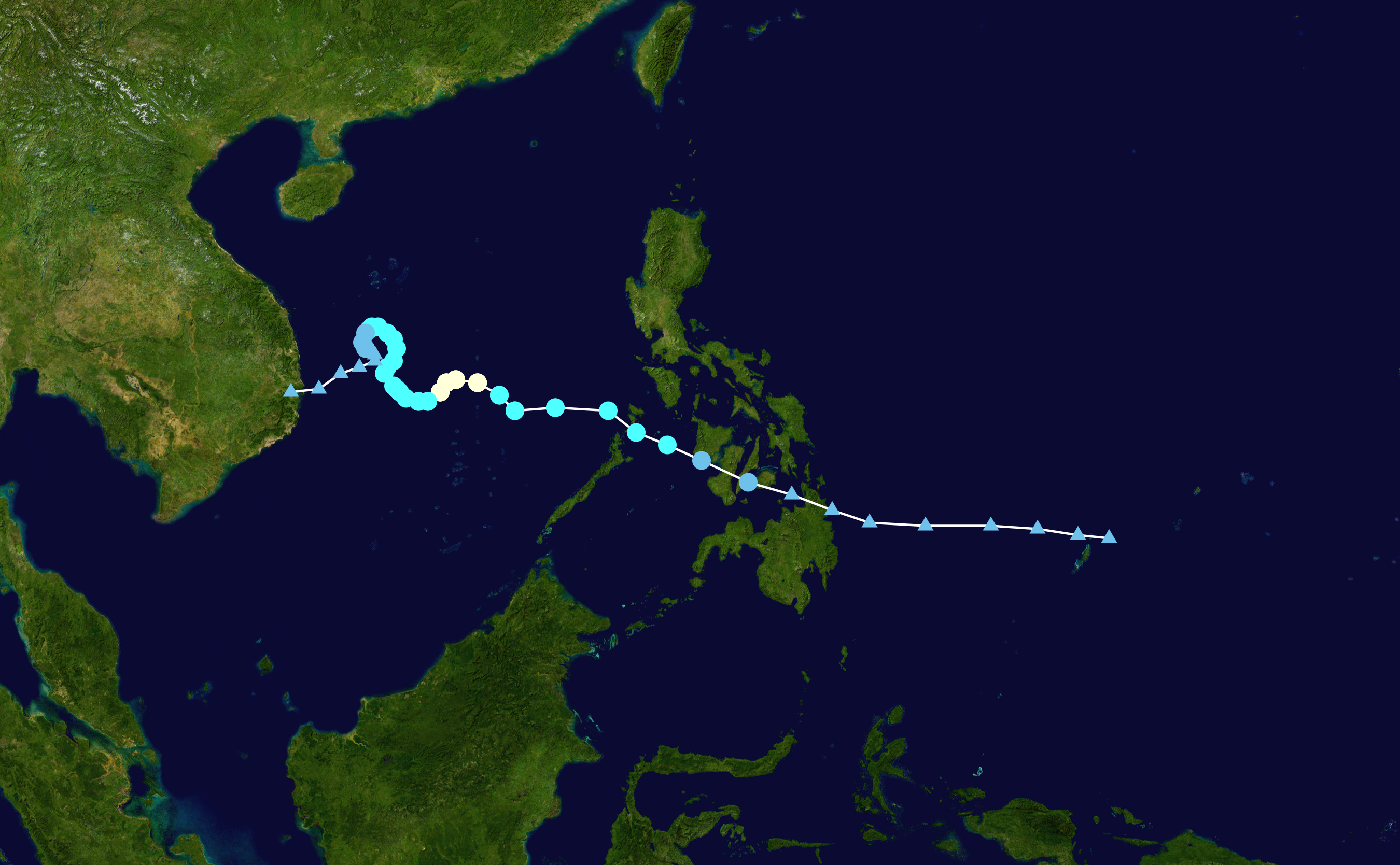
Map plotting the storm's track and intensity, according to the Saffir–Simpson scale Map key Saffir–Simpson scale Tropical depression (≤38 mph, ≤62 km/h) Tropical storm (39–73 mph, 63–118 km/h) Category 1 (74–95 mph, 119–153 km/h) Category 2 (96–110 mph, 154–177 km/h) Category 3 (111–129 mph, 178–208 km/h) Category 4 (130–156 mph, 209–251 km/h) Category 5 (≥157 mph, ≥252 km/h) Unknown Storm type Tropical cyclone Subtropical cyclone Extratropical cyclone, remnant low, tropical disturbance, or monsoon depression

At 04:00 PHT (20:00 UTC the previous day) on November 23, PAGASA announced the entry of a low-pressure area to the Philippine Area of Responsibility (PAR), carrying a high chance of development. At 12:00 UTC, the JMA also identified an area of low pressure. Three hours later, the JTWC designated the system as Invest 92W, located roughly 171 nautical miles (317 km) west-northwest of Palau, noting flaring convection and developing banding along the southern periphery of its circulation. The agency assessed environmental conditions as favorable, including low wind shear. By 18:00 UTC, the JMA upgraded the disturbance to a tropical depression east of Mindanao. At 02:00 PHT (18:00 UTC) on November 24, PAGASA likewise classified the system as a tropical depression and assigned the name Verbena. At 13:30 PHT (05:30 UTC), Verbena made its first landfall over Bayabas, Surigao del Sur. At 06:00 UTC, the JTWC issued a Tropical Cyclone Formation Alert for the system, citing generally favorable conditions. The JMA noted that limited firmness of the system's structure along with an obscure low-level center kept the system from strengthening. As it tracked westward, clusters of deep convection began to wrap more consistently around the circulation. Verbena made a second landfall at 23:10 PHT (15:10 UTC) over Jagna, Bohol.

The system made two more landfalls on November 25: at 02:40 PHT (18:40 UTC the previous day) over Talisay City, Cebu, and again at 05:50 PHT (21:50 UTC the previous day) over Vallehermoso, Negros Oriental. At 21:00 UTC, the JTWC upgraded the system to a tropical depression, designating it as 33W, and reported a developing central dense overcast (CDO) and a possible low-level circulation center within generally favorable environmental conditions. 33W then made its fifth and sixth landfalls in Western Visayas—at 07:40 PHT (23:40 UTC the previous day) over San Lorenzo, Guimaras, and at 08:50 PHT (00:50 UTC) over Miagao, Iloilo. As the circulation rapidly consolidated, deep convection persisted and organized into a symmetrical CDO. The JTWC subsequently upgraded the system to a tropical storm as curved rainbands tightened around the center. At 20:00 PHT (12:00 UTC), PAGASA also upgraded the system to a tropical storm. At the same time, the JMA named the storm Koto, which replaced the name Kammuri following its retirement after the 2019 season. At 22:50 PHT (14:50 UTC), Koto made its seventh landfall over Linapacan, Palawan before tracking west-northwest away from the Philippines.

Deep convection remained displaced slightly from the center as cloud tops cooled, and the JTWC later noted a slight northward tilt in the vortex on November 26. At 11:00 PHT (03:00 UTC), PAGASA upgraded Koto to a severe tropical storm. At 12:00 UTC, the JMA upgraded Koto to a typhoon, while cirrus filaments expanded and the CDO flared at the center of the circulation. At 21:00 UTC, the JTWC likewise upgraded Koto to a typhoon as radial outflow strengthened. An exposed low-level circulation center with shear deep convection, the JTWC reported that the system's structure was weakened with dry air in the eastern quadrant, aiding in its weakening. At 21:00 UTC, the JTWC downgraded Koto into a tropical storm while the JMA downgraded Koto into a severe tropical storm likewise. The former cited rapidly warming cloud tops along with strong southeasterly wind shear enabling the decoupling of the central convection in an increasingly hostile environment; the latter, meanwhile reported an unfavorable environment caused by low sea surface temperatures and an increased vertical wind shear.

At 12:00 UTC on November 28, the JMA downgraded Koto into a tropical storm citing an unfavorable environment due to less tropical cyclone heat potential; the typhoon remained almost stationary due to a weak steering flow. Over time, deep convection started to regenerate over the low-level circulation center yet dry air and cooler water prevented major development. At 18:00 UTC, the JMA upgraded the system into a severe tropical storm once again due to a favorable environment with weak vertical wind shear and good upper-level outflow. The system was eventually declared as well-organized as broad cyclonic rotation was spotted; as the central dense overcast collapsed, the system's structure was disorganized as environmental conditions were declared as marginally favorable. Eventually, moderate convection began to redevelop over the low-level circulation center as a cluster of deep, dry air impinged on the outer fringes of the system. At 09:00 UTC on November 30, the JMA downgraded Koto into a tropical storm as an unfavorable environment coalesced with low tropical cyclone heat potential and dry air. Weak convection was placed to the south of a partially exposed low-level circulation center with the system majorly weakening due to upwelling effects. Eventually, the low-level circulation center became fully exposed while a layer of dry air pushed to the vortex originating northwest. Outflow was described as non-existent due to lack of convection while the environment has begun to deteriorate. At 06:00 UTC on December 1, the JMA downgraded Koto into a tropical depression due to an unfavorable environment as it barely moved due to weak steering flow.

== Preparations, impact, and aftermath ==
=== Philippines ===
On 05:00 PHT (21:00 UTC) on November 24, PAGASA issued Tropical Cyclone Wind Signal No. 1 in Aklan, Antique including Caluya Islands, Biliran, Bohol, Camotes Islands, Capiz, Dinagat Islands, Guimaras, Iloilo, Leyte, mainland Masbate, Romblon, Southern Leyte, Surigao del Norte including Siargao Island and Bucas Grande Island, the northern portions of Agusan del Norte, Negros Occidental, Negros Oriental and Surigao del Sur, northern and central Cebu, the central and southern portions of Eastern Samar and Samar, and the southern portions of Occidental Mindoro and Oriental Mindoro. Signal No. 1 was also issued on 08:00 PHT (00:00 UTC), in Camiguin, Siquijor, the remaining parts of Agusan del Norte, Cebu, Negros Occidental, Negros Oriental, the northern portions of Agusan del Sur and Palawan including the Calamian Islands and Cuyo Islands, and northeastern Misamis Oriental, on 11:00 PHT (03:00 UTC), in Cagayancillo Island, and the remaining parts of Eastern Samar, Occidental Mindoro, Oriental Mindoro, and Samar, and then on 14:00 PHT (06:00 UTC), in the remaining parts of Agusan del Sur, Misamis Oriental and Surigao del Sur, and also in northern Bukidnon. Signal No. 1 was also issued on 17:00 PHT (09:00 UTC) in the northern portions of Misamis Occidental and Zamboanga del Norte, and on 20:00 PHT (12:00 UTC), in central Palawan. As the system intensified into a tropical storm, PAGASA issued Tropical Cyclone Wind Signal No. 2 at 20:00 PHT (12:00 UTC) on November 25, in the Calamian Islands and extreme northern Palawan while on 05:00 PHT the next day (21:00 UTC the previous day), Signal No. 1 was issued in the Kalayaan Islands. At 11:00 PHT (03:00 UTC), the Kalayaan Islands was the only area which remained in Signal No. 1. At 23:00 PHT (15:00 UTC) on November 27, PAGASA issued their final report.

Lapu-Lapu City activated its Emergency Operations Center as the government was in heightened alert. The city also assessed a Pre-Disaster Risk Assessment (PDRA) by mayor Cynthia Chan in the Sangguniang Panlungsod Session Hall. Roll-on/roll-off vessels were only permitted to sail if they had a tonnage more than 300. On November 24, 13 ports suspended sea trips nationwide. Flood-prone barangays in Liloan were preemptively evacuated. Negros Occidental also performed preemptive evacuation to centers with stocked food and water. The Mandaue city government started the evacuation of residents in preparation for the approach of the storm, as its water absorption capacity caused flooding risks to increase, after Typhoon Kalmaegi (Tino) affected the city last November 4. Overnight, more than 4,700 people evacuated from Cebu City while 81 barangay health centers remained on active duty. Authorities and emergency responders in Bicol were placed on high alert as heavy rains affected the area. According to acting Philippine National Police Chief Jose Melencio Nartatez, disaster response units were alerted in areas included in Signal No. 1.

The Southern Visayas Coast Guard reported that 390 passengers were stranded in the area on November 24 in 27 vessels and 169 rolling cargoes. As alerts rose in parts of the Philippines, the Philippine Coast Guard, on November 25, reported 5,576 passengers stranded nationwide. As heavy rains and floods coalesced in Negros Occidental; four transmission lines in the Visayas archipelago were downed. Floodwaters rose fast in Antequera, Bohol, submerging numerous houses. Floods in Bohol served waist-deep while rivers overflowed. A vessel was stuck for an hour due to damage to its steering wheel in Padre Burgos, Southern Leyte; an airplane struggled to land in Roxas Airport due to inclement weather. In Olango Island, 22 houses were damaged due to light construction materials used in the island's houses as well as the island's proximity to the coast. Floods in Bacolod reached from knee to hip-deep while in several barangays, flooding reached rooftops. Widespread flooding was also reported in numerous towns in southern Negros. The National Disaster Risk Reduction and Management Council (NDRRMC) said that 275,458 people across the Philippines were affected by Koto, of which 82,827 were displaced. At least 13 houses were destroyed while 82 others were damaged. At least 37 road sections and five bridges were rendered impassable. Seventy-nine seaports were closed, stranding 3,727 passengers and 158 maritime vessels. In the Negros Island Region, two people were reported missing. More than 3,000 people were displaced in Bacolod. while at least 2,000 were displaced in Bohol and at least 13,831 were displaced in Negros Occidental. A state of calamity was declared in Naujan, Oriental Mindoro due to flooding.

=== Vietnam ===
The National Civil Defense Steering Committee instructed People's Committees of provinces and cities from Quang Tri to Lam Dong to organize disaster response plans for Koto.

As Koto made landfall over Khánh Hòa Province as a remnant low, it triggered heavy rainfall in South Central Vietnam. At Phan Dũng station in Lâm Đồng, rainfall was recorded at 195mm, and at Khánh Hiệp in Khánh Hòa, rainfall was recorded at 189mm. In Cam Ly river in Lâm Đồng, the flood peak at Thanh Binh station breaks the 2019 record.

As of December 22, damage in Lâm Đồng by Koto and flooding in early December reached 242 billion dong (US$9.6 million) and 2 people were dead. In this province, 8,000 houses were flooded, approximately 5,200 hectares of crops were affected; 30 fishing boats sank.

== See also ==
- Weather of 2025
- Tropical cyclones in 2025
- Typhoons in the Philippines
