= Agatha Wong =

Filipino wushu athlete

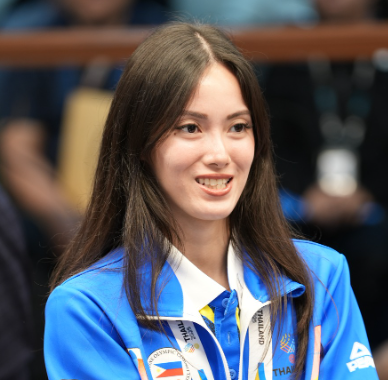
- Wong in 2026

Personal information
- Nationality: Filipino
- Born: May 20, 1998 (age 28) Quezon City, Philippines
- Height: 1.68 m (5 ft 6 in)

Sport
- Country: Philippines
- Sport: Wushu
- Events: Taijijian, Taijiquan
Medal record
Women's Wushu Taolu
Representing Philippines
Event	1st	2nd	3rd
World Championships	0	2	1
Asian Games	0	0	1
Southeast Asian Games	6	2	0
Total	6	4	2
World Championships
Silver medal – second place	2015 Jakarta	Taijiquan Compulsory
Silver medal – second place	2023 Fort Worth	Taijiquan
Bronze medal – third place	2025 Brasília	Taijiquan
Asian Games
Bronze medal – third place	2018 Jakarta–Palembang	Taijiquan
World Cup
Bronze medal – third place	2016 Fuzhou	Taijijian
SEA Games
Gold medal – first place	2025 Thailand	Taijijian + Taijiquan
Gold medal – first place	2023 Cambodia	Taijijian + Taijiquan
Gold medal – first place	2021 Vietnam	Taijijian
Gold medal – first place	2019 Philippines	Taijijian
Gold medal – first place	2019 Philippines	Taijiquan
Gold medal – first place	2017 Kuala Lumpur	Taijiquan
Silver medal – second place	2021 Vietnam	Taijiquan
Silver medal – second place	2017 Kuala Lumpur	Taijijian

Agatha Chrystenzen Fernandez Wong (born May 20, 1998) is a Filipino wushu athlete. She has won medals for the Philippines at the Southeast Asian Games, Asian Games, and the World Wushu Championships.

== Early life and education ==
Agatha Chrystenzen Fernandez Wong was born on May 20, 1998, in Quezon City, Philippines, tracing her roots to Dagupan, Pangasinan. Her father, Christopher Wong Sr. is Filipino of Chinese descent, while her mother, Richa Agatha Wong (née Fernandez) is Filipino American. Wong also has two younger siblings, a brother and a sister. At a young age, she was encouraged to try various sports including swimming, karate, and wushu.

Wong studied at the College of Holy Spirit in Quezon City and the De La Salle–College of Saint Benilde where she graduated with a Bachelor of Arts in Consular and Diplomatic Affairs.

By 2023, Wong would be in medical school, balancing her schedule with being an athlete. She entered the UERM Medical Center.

== Career ==
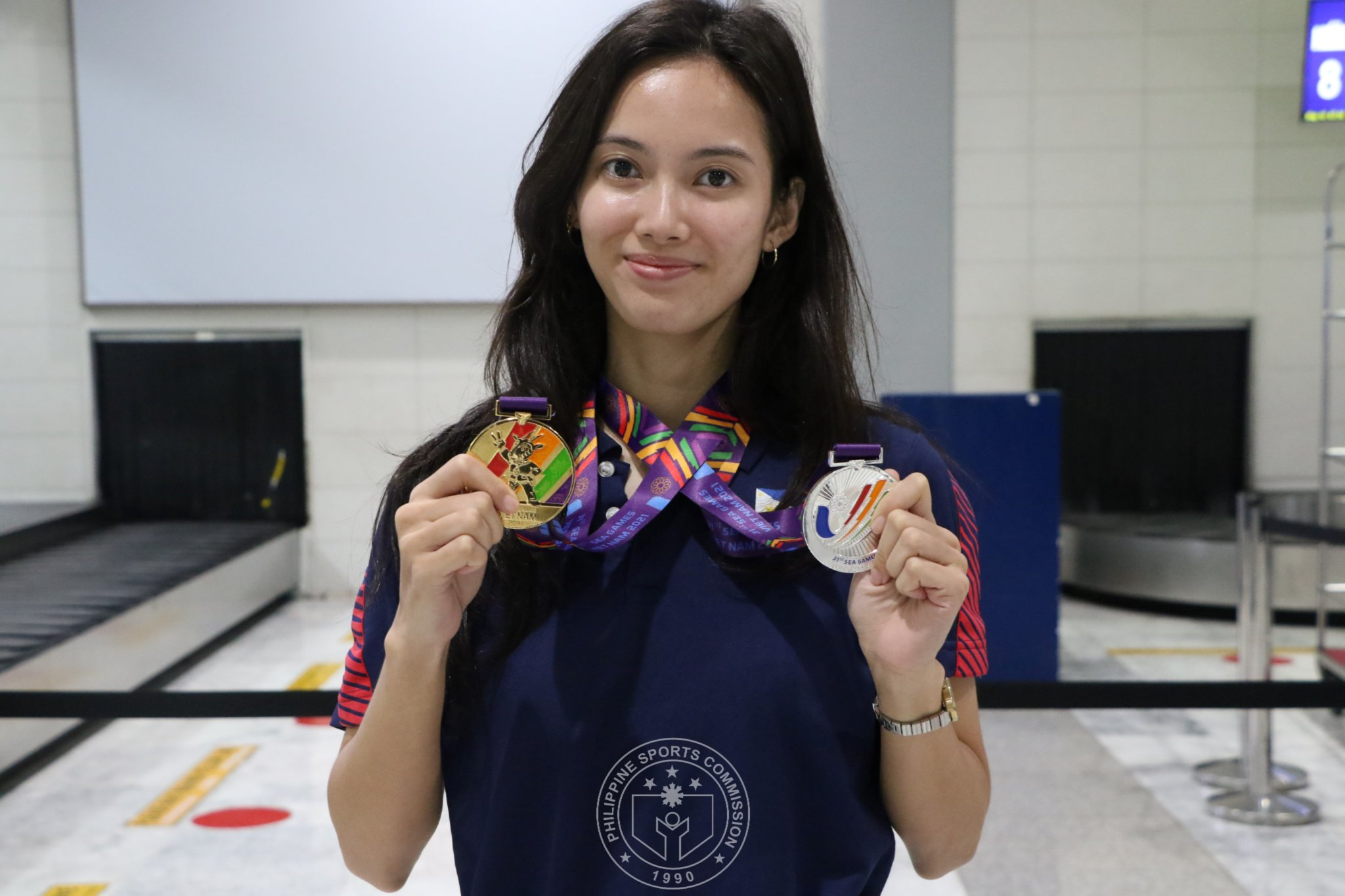
Wong with her medals from the 2021 Southeast Asian Games

Specializing in taolu, Wong has been a wushu athlete since she was 8 years old.

She won her first medal in an international competition at the 2013 Asian Junior Wushu Championships in Makati, Philippines by besting the under-15 women's 32 form taijiquan of the Taolu competitions. She won two medals (gold in Taijijian and bronze in Taijiquan) in the following edition held in Inner Mongolia, China.

Wong won a bronze medal at the 2018 Asian Games held in Jakarta–Palembang despite the Wushu delegation experiencing financial issues which prevented her from training in China, as customarily done for high-profile competitions. She also sustained a grade 2 slipped disc injury prior to the games and has not yet fully recovered by the time she competed in the continental competition.

At the 2018 Asian Traditional Wushu Championships in Nanjing, China, Wong clinched two medals for the Philippines by besting the Group B women's Taijijian and Group B women's Taijiquan events

Wong also competed at the 2017 and 2019 Southeast Asian Games; clinching the gold medal for the taijiquan event and silver for taijijian at the 2017 SEA Games in Kuala Lumpur, Malaysia, and two gold medals for the taijiquan and taijijian events at the 2019 SEA Games in the Philippines.
