= Swimming at the 2024 ASEAN University Games =

- Venue: Komite Olahraga Nasional Indonesia Jawa Timur
- Location: Surabaya, East Java
- Dates: 24 June–1 July

Swimming competitions at the 2024 ASEAN University Games took place at the Komite Olahraga Nasional Indonesia Jawa Timur in Surabaya, East Java.

== Participating Nations ==
A total from 6 nations participated in the 2024 ASEAN University Games.

- Cambodia
- Indonesia
- Malaysia
- Thailand
- Singapore
- Vietnam

== Medal table ==
* Host nation (Indonesia)

Rank	Nation	Gold	Silver	Bronze	Total
1	Indonesia*	19	16	14	49
2	Thailand	9	10	5	24
3	Malaysia	9	7	16	32
4	Singapore	1	4	1	6
5	Vietnam	0	1	1	2
6	Cambodia	0	0	0	0
Totals (6 entries)		38	38	37	113

== Medalist ==
Key
AS	Asian record	GR	Southeast Asian Games record	NR	National record	OQT	Paris 2024 Qualification

=== Men ===
Event	Gold		Silver		Bronze	
50 m freestyle	Kanttemool Tonnam (THA)	23.06	Joe Aditya Wijaya Kurniawan (INA)	23.37	Xin Ren Bryan Leong (MAS)	23.50
100 m freestyle	Kanttemool Tonnam (THA)	51.09	Joe Aditya Wijaya Kurniawan (INA)	51.63	Terence Ng Shin Jian (MAS)	51.72
200 m freestyle	Kanttemool Tonnam (THA)	1:51.09	Terence Ng Shin Jian (MAS)	1:52.12	Khai Xin Tan (MAS)	1:52.34
400 m freestyle	Khai Xin Tan (MAS)	4:05.18	Zheng Yong Low (MAS)	4:06.21	Truong Viet Vu (VIE)	4:08.34
1500 m freestyle	Zheng Yong Low (MAS)	16:40.87	Truong Viet Vu (VIE)	16:51.61	Liew Zeng Wye (MAS)	17:00.03
50 m backstroke	Farrel Armandio Tangkas (INA)	26.10	Kanttemool Tonnam (THA)	26.22	Dwiki Anugrah (INA)	27.05
100 m backstroke	Farrel Armandio Tangkas (INA)	55.87	Romeo Lingga Alfarizi (INA)	57.75	Rutsonot Geargchai (THA)	58.84
200 m backstroke	Farrel Armandio Tangkas (INA)	2:01.70	Kanttemool Tonnam (THA)	2:02.58	Puong Wei Hii (MAS)	2:07.00
50 m breaststroke	Andi Muhammad Nurrizka Febrianto (INA)	28.53	Cheong Nicholas Ee Seng (SGP)	28.96	Xin Ren Bryan Leong (MAS)	29.43
100 m breaststroke	Andi Muhammad Nurrizka Febrianto (INA)	1:03.27	Janruksa Thanonchai (THA)	1:04.45	Hii Puong Wei (MAS)	1:04.47
200 m breaststroke	Hii Puong Wei (MAS)	2:20.08	Janruksa Thanonchai (THA)	2:21.25	Andi Muhammad Nurrizka Febrianto (INA)	2:21.34
50 m butterfly	Xin Ren Bryan Leong (MAS)	24.54	Azel Zelmi Aryalingga (INA)	24.87	Ong Jung Yi (SGP)	25.00
100 m butterfly	Xin Ren Bryan Leong (MAS)	54.22	Ong Jung Yi (SGP)	54.93	Joe Aditya Wijaya Kurniawan (INA)	55.16
200 m butterfly	Low Zheng Yong (MAS)	2:08.48	Liew Zeng Wye (MAS)	2:10.23	Not awarded	
200 m individual medley	Farrel Armandio Tangkas (INA)	2:05.66	Hii Puong Wei (MAS)	2:06.17	Erick Ahmad Fathoni (INA)	2:09.44
400 m individual medley	Khai Xin Tan (MAS)	4:43.70	Zeng Wye Liew (MAS)	4:45.90	Andi Muhammad Nurrizka Febrianto (INA)	4:51.39
4×100 m freestyle relay	Indonesia; I Komang Gede Mas Dekotama; Dwiki Anugrah; Erick Ahmad Fathoni; Joe Aditya Wijaya Kurniawan	3:28.17	Malaysia; Bryan Leong Xin Ren; Ng Tze Xiang; Shin Jian Terence Ng; Khai Xin Tan	3:29.53	Thailand; Kanteemool Tonnam; Panturaksa Wasu; Rutnosot Geargchai; Wareemaneesilp Phurit	3:33.72
4×200 m freestyle relay	Malaysia; Puong Wei Hii; Zheng Yong Low; Shin Jian Terence Ng; Khai Xin Tan	7:38.24	Indonesia; Muhammad Farhan Andi Maroef; Dwiki Anugrah; Farrel Armandio Tangkas; Joe Aditya Wijaya Kurniawan	7:41.45	Thailand; Kanteemool Tonnam; Panturaksa Wasu; Rutnosot Geargchai; Chailangka Ratchapum	7:53.16
4×100 m medley relay	Indonesia; Andi Muhammad Nurrizka; Erick Ahmad Fathoni; Farrel Armandio Tangkas; Joe Aditya Wijaya Kurniawan	3:47.12	Thailand; Kanteemool Tonnam; Panturaksa Wasu; Rutnosot Geargchai; Janruksa Thanonchai	3:48.43	Malaysia; Bryan Leong Xin Ren; Hii Puong Wei; Shin Jian Terence Ng; Khai Xin Tan	33:53.01

=== Women ===
Event	Gold		Silver		Bronze	
50 m freestyle	Tungnapakorn Komonluck (THA)	26.84	Boonamphai Saovanee (THA)	26.86	Serenna Karmelita Muslim (INA)	26.93
100 m freestyle	Tungnapakorn Komonluck (THA)	58.01	Serenna Karmelita Muslim (INA)	58.34	Azzahra Permatahani (INA)	58.71
200 m freestyle	Chan Zi Yi (SGP)	2:05.39	Serenna Karmelita Muslim (INA)	2:07.66	Azzahra Permatahani (INA)	2:07.97
400 m freestyle	Izzy Dwifaiva Hefrisyanthi (INA)	4:24.77	Chan Zi Yi (SGP)	4:28.72	Serenna Karmelita Muslim (INA)	4:33.29
800 m freestyle	Izzy Dwifaiva Hefrisyanthi (INA)	9:04.13	Chan Zi Yi (SGP)	9:23.64	Georgene Wee Ee Jern (MAS)	9:29.46
50 m backstroke	Boonamphai Saovanee (THA)	29.19	Angel Gabriella Yus (INA)	29.68	Flairene Candrea Wonomiharjo (INA)	29.78
100 m backstroke	Angel Gabriella Yus (INA)	1:03.24	Flairene Candrea Wonomiharjo (INA)	1:03.84	Boonamphai Saovanee (THA)	1:04.10
200 m backstroke	Flairene Candrea Wonomiharjo (INA)	2:20.87	Angel Gabriella Yus (INA)	2:21.35	Denphaetcharangkul Worranat (THA)	2:32.60
50 m breaststroke	Phee Jinq En (MAS)	32.03	Boonamphai Saovanee (THA)	32.33	Nurita Monica Sari (INA)	32.95
100 m breaststroke	Boonamphai Saovanee (THA)	1:11.12	Adellia (INA)	1:11.79	Nurita Monica Sari (INA)	1:12.59
200 m breaststroke	Adellia (INA)	2:33.81	Phee Jinq En (MAS)	2:33.89	Azzahra Permatahani (INA)	2:36.46
50 m butterfly	Tungnapakorn Komonluck (THA)	28.05	Angel Gabirella Yus (INA)	28.73	Wong Shi Qi (MAS)	28.90
100 m butterfly	Tungnapakorn Komonluck (THA)	1:02.70	Azzahra Permatahani (INA)	1:02.81	Gusti Ayu Made Nadya Saraswati (INA)	1:04.21
200 m butterfly	Adinda Larasati Dewi Kirana (INA)	2:18.53	Azzahra Permatahani (INA)	2:18.78	Georgene Wee Ee Jern (MAS)	2:23.96
200 m individual medley	Azzahra Permatahani (INA)	2:21.80	Gusti Ayu Made Nadya Saraswati (INA)	2:26.02	Christy Teh Xing Ti (MAS)	2:33.03
400 m individual medley	Azzahra Permatahani (INA)	5:01.49	Gusti Ayu Made Nadya Saraswati (INA)	5:09.72	Georgene Wee Ee Jern (MAS)	5:12.44
4×100 m freestyle relay	Indonesia; Gusti Ayu Made Nadya Saraswati; Angel Gabriella Yus; Serenna Karmelita Muslim; Azzahra Permatahani	3:57.30	Thailand; Tungnapakorn Komonluck; Boonamphai Saovanee; Subha-Amorn Panthira; Chawanuchit Pannita	3:59.27	Malaysia; Wong Shi Qi; Georgene Wee Ee Jern; Ng Zi Syuen; Chu Xin Ying	4:06.85
4×200 m freestyle relay	Indonesia; Izzy Dwifaiva Hefrisyanthi; Adinda Larasati Dewi Kirana; Serenna Karmelita Muslim; Azzahra Permatahani	8:31.20	Thailand; Tungnapakorn Komonluck; Boonamphai Saovanee; Nuchwara Wicakdanapon Vichaksanapong; Chawanuchit Pannita	8:57.77	Malaysia; Wong Shi Qi; Georgene Wee Ee Jern; Jerriel Lau; Chu Xin Ying	9:05.34
4×100 m medley relay	Indonesia; Flairene Candrea Wonomiharjo; Adellia; Serenna Karmelita Muslim; Azzahra Permatahani	4:19.16	Thailand; Tungnapakorn Komonluck; Boonamphai Saovanee; Denphaetcharangkul Worranat; Chawanuchit Pannita	4:22.60	Malaysia; Christy Teh Xing Ti; Lee Yen Yi; Ng Zi Syuen; Ho Keesha	4:44.40
