= Wushu at the 2019 SEA Games =

- Venue: World Trade Center
- Location: Pasay, Metro Manila, Philippines
- Dates: December 1–3
- Competitors: 72 from 9 nations

The wushu competition at the 2019 SEA Games in the Philippines was held at the World Trade Center in Pasay, Metro Manila from December 1 to 3, 2019.

== Participating nations ==
A total of 72 athletes from 9 nations participated (the numbers of athletes are shown in parentheses).

- Brunei (5)
- Indonesia (8)
- Laos (7)
- Malaysia (7)
- Myanmar (11)
- Philippines (11)
- Singapore (5)
- Thailand (6)
- Vietnam (12)

== Medal summary ==
=== Medal table ===
* Host nation (Philippines)

Rank	NOC	Gold	Silver	Bronze	Total
1	Philippines (PHI)*	7	2	2	11
2	Vietnam (VIE)	3	2	7	12
3	Indonesia (INA)	2	5	2	9
4	Malaysia (MAS)	2	1	1	4
5	Brunei (BRU)	1	3	2	6
6	Singapore (SGP)	1	1	0	2
7	Myanmar (MYA)	0	1	3	4
8	Thailand (THA)	0	1	2	3
9	Laos (LAO)	0	0	3	3
Totals (9 entries)		16	16	22	54

=== Men's taolu ===
Event	Gold	Silver	Bronze
Changquan	Yong Yi Xiang; Singapore	Wong Weng Son; Malaysia	Trần Xuân Hiệp; Vietnam
Daoshu / Gunshu	Edgar Xavier Marvelo; Indonesia	Jowen Lim; Singapore	Trần Xuân Hiệp; Vietnam
Nanquan	Phạm Quốc Khánh; Vietnam	Harris Horatius; Indonesia	Thein Than Oo; Myanmar
Nandao / Nangun	Mohammad Adi Salihin; Brunei	Harris Horatius; Indonesia	Phạm Quốc Khánh; Vietnam
Taijiquan	Loh Choon How; Malaysia	Hosea Wong Zheng Yu; Brunei	Daniel Parantac; Philippines
Taijijian	Loh Choon How; Malaysia	Jones Llabres Inso; Philippines	Hosea Wong Zheng Yu; Brunei
Duilian	Indonesia; Seraf Naro Siregar; Edgar Xavier Marvelo; Harris Horatius	Brunei; Madjurano Joel Majallah Sain; Muhd Safiee Shayferan Roslan	Philippines; Johnzenth Gazo; Jones Llabres Inso; Thornton Quieney Lou Sayan

=== Women's taolu ===
Event	Gold	Silver	Bronze
Taijiquan	Agatha Wong; Philippines	Basma Lachkar; Brunei	Trần Thị Minh Huyền; Vietnam
Taijijian	Agatha Wong; Philippines	Trần Thị Minh Huyền; Vietnam	Basma Lachkar; Brunei

=== Men's sanda ===
Event	Gold	Silver	Bronze
48 kg	Jessie Aligaga; Philippines	Ade Permana; Indonesia	Aung Myo Tun; Myanmar
48 kg	Jessie Aligaga; Philippines	Ade Permana; Indonesia	Vũ Minh Đức; Vietnam
52 kg	Arnel Mandal; Philippines	Laksamana Pandu Pratama; Indonesia	Khavy Phommakhanthong; Laos
52 kg	Arnel Mandal; Philippines	Laksamana Pandu Pratama; Indonesia	Đinh Văn Hương; Vietnam
56 kg	Francisco Solis; Philippines	Yusuf Widiyanto; Indonesia	Teng Kai Wen; Malaysia
56 kg	Francisco Solis; Philippines	Yusuf Widiyanto; Indonesia	Nghiêm Văn Ý Vietnam
60 kg	Bùi Trường Giang; Vietnam	Gideon Fred Padua; Philippines	Noukhith Latsaphao; Laos
60 kg	Bùi Trường Giang; Vietnam	Gideon Fred Padua; Philippines	Charuwat Khunphet; Thailand
65 kg	Clemente Tabugara Jr. Philippines	Kittisak Suksanguan; Thailand	Abdul Haris Sofyan; Indonesia
65 kg	Clemente Tabugara Jr. Philippines	Kittisak Suksanguan; Thailand	Ko Ko Chit; Myanmar

=== Women's sanda ===
Event	Gold	Silver	Bronze
48 kg	Divine Wally; Philippines	Nguyễn Thị Chinh; Vietnam	Laty Keobounthan; Laos
48 kg	Divine Wally; Philippines	Nguyễn Thị Chinh; Vietnam	Rosalina Simanjuntak; Indonesia
65 kg	Nguyễn Thị Trang; Vietnam	Su Hlaing Win; Myanmar	Suchaya Bualuang; Thailand
