= Malaysia at the 2024 ASEAN University Games =

- IOC code: MAS
- National federation: Malaysian University Sports Council
- Website: www.masum.org.my

in Surabaya and Malang, Indonesia 25 June 2024 – 6 July 2024
- Competitors: 262 in 18 sports
- Flag bearer: Bryan Leong Xin Ren
- Medals Ranked 3rd: Gold 38 Silver 47 Bronze 62 Total 147

ASEAN University Games appearances
- auto

Malaysia competed at the 2024 ASEAN University Games in Surabaya and Malang, Indonesia from 25 June to 6 July 2024. The Malaysian contingent consisted of 262 athletes, competing in 18 out 20 sports.

Overall, the Malaysian contingent won 38 golds and was in third position and managed to reach the target of 35 gold medals.

== Medal summary ==
=== Medal by sport ===
Medals by sport
Sport	1st place, gold medalist(s)	2nd place, silver medalist(s)	3rd place, bronze medalist(s)	Total
Archery	2	6	1	9
Athletics	13	10	8	31
Badminton	2	3	2	7
Basketball	0	2	2	4
Chess	0	4	7	11
Futsal	0	1	0	1
Handball	1	0	0	1
Judo	3	3	1	7
Karate	3	3	8	14
Pencak silat	2	5	8	15
Petanque	1	0	2	3
Sepak takraw	0	0	2	2
Swimming	9	7	16	32
Taekwondo	2	3	5	10
Total	38	47	62	147

=== Medal by date ===
Medals by date
Date	1st place, gold medalist(s)	2nd place, silver medalist(s)	3rd place, bronze medalist(s)	Total
26 June	3	2	3	8
27 June	5	2	6	13
28 June	2	5	6	13
29 June	1	5	4	10
30 June	2	1	3	6
1 July	1	2	6	9
2 July	4	6	5	15
3 July	4	3	11	18
4 July	7	6	8	21
5 July	7	6	6	19
6 July	2	9	4	15
Total	38	47	62	147

=== Medalists ===
Medal	Name	Sport	Event	Date
Gold	Nur Farah Izzati Wallah	Judo	Women's -52 kg	26 June
Gold	Tan Khai Xin	Swimming	Men's 400 m freestyle	26 June
Gold	Phee Jinq En	Swimming	Women's 50 m breaststroke	26 June
Gold	Afiq Danish Zapri	Judo	Men's -90 kg	27 June
Gold	Amir Daniel Abdul Majeed	Judo	Men's -81 kg	27 June
Gold	Tan Khai Xin	Swimming	Men's 400 m individual medley	27 June
Gold	Bryan Leong Xin Ren	Swimming	Men's 50 m butterfly	27 June
Gold	Hii Puong Wei; Low Zheng Yong; Terence Ng Shin Jian; Tan Khai Xin	Swimming	Men's 4×200 m freestyle relay	27 June
Gold	Bryan Leong Xin Ren	Swimming	Men's 100 m butterfly	28 June
Gold	Hii Puong Wei	Swimming	Men's 200 m breaststroke	28 June
Gold	Mohamad Muqri Arif Mohamad Sapiny; Syed Afiq Fakhri Syed Ali; Nur Asyikin Roslan	Petanque	Mixed triples (2M+1W)	29 June
Gold	Low Zheng Yong	Swimming	Men's 1500 m freestyle	30 June
Gold	Chee Woon Chong; Mohamad Alif Hakimie Mohd Zaini; Muhammad Azariezad Mohd Razali; Mohamad Haiqal Suffian; Zamzuri Zalif James Palmen; Mohammad Daniel Aiman Mohd Zuki; Syahmi Haziq Hishamuddin; You Wei Thye; Sampson Paren Malang; Jun Rong Woon; Wan Muhamad Mirza Wan Zikernai; Muhamad Hilmanul Aqil Mohd Noor Azeni; Ahmad Amirul Aqil Paudzi; Abdullah Sani Mustari	Handball	Men's team	30 June
Gold	Low Zheng Yong	Swimming	Men's 200 m butterfly	1 July
Gold	Queenie Ting Kung Ni	Athletics	Women's discus throw	2 July
Gold	Ng Qi Xuan; Wee Yee Hern	Badminton	Mixed doubles	2 July
Gold	Liew Xun; Wong Tien Ci	Badminton	Men's doubles	2 July
Gold	Andre Anura Anuar	Athletics	Men's long jump	2 July
Gold	Nani Sahirah Maryata	Athletics	Women's shot put	3 July
Gold	Shereen Samson Vallabouy	Athletics	Women's 400 m	3 July
Gold	Umar Osman	Athletics	Men's 400 m	3 July
Gold	Aliff Iman Mohd Fahimi; Mohamad Raimi Mustaffa Kamal; Mohammad Thaqif Mohammad Hisham; Muhammad Azeem Fahmi	Athletics	Men's 4×100 m relay	3 July
Gold	Muhammad Aiman Syazuwan Abdullah	Athletics	Men's high jump	4 July
Gold	Sadat Marzuqi Ajisan	Athletics	Men's shot put	4 July
Gold	Wan Muhammad Fazri Wan Zahari	Athletics	Men's 800 m	4 July
Gold	Nur Humaira Abdul Karim; Seah Jing Ying; Wong Zin	Taekwondo	Women's team poomsae	4 July
Gold	Muhammad Azeem Mohd Fahmi	Athletics	Men's 200 m	4 July
Gold	Maizal Mazli Mansor; Muhammad Azri Farhan Mohamad Azli	Pencak silat	Men's Ganda	4 July
Gold	Siti Nur Azwani Nor Ali	Karate	Women's −61 kg Kumite	4 July
Gold	Mohammad Firdaus Mohd Israj	Pencak silat	Men's class B	5 July
Gold	Muhammad Syafiq Zuber	Taekwondo	Men's kyorugi -87 kg	5 July
Gold	Mohd Rizzua Muhamad Haizad	Athletics	Men's 110 m hurdles	5 July
Gold	Mandy Goh Li; Chelsea Cassiopea Evali Bopulas; Frenynila Sherly Lucius; Shereen Samson Vallabouy	Athletics	Women's 4×400 m relay	5 July
Gold	Abdul Wafiy Roslan; Muhammad Syakir Daniel Fauzi; Muhammad Firdaus Mohamad Zemi; Umar Osman	Athletics	Men's 4×400 m relay	5 July
Gold	Sureeya Sankar Hari Sankar	Karate	Men's −60 kg Kumite	5 July
Gold	Thevendran Kaliana Sundram	Karate	Men's −55 kg Kumite	5 July
Gold	Muhammad Danieal Haqiemi Sohebi	Archery	Men's individual compound bow	6 July
Gold	Mohamad Syafiq Md Ariffin; Muhammad Danieal Haqiemi Sohebi; Abdul Faathir Aqil Rafizam	Archery	Men's team compound bow	6 July
Silver	Muhammad Farez Mohameid	Judo	Men's -60 kg	26 June
Silver	Low Zheng Yong	Swimming	Men's 400 m freestyle	26 June
Silver	Lye Lik Zang; Fahman Arasy Ayub; Mukhriez Shah Mahmood Shah; Muhd Hafizuddin Zulkifli	Chess	Men's team (Blitz)	27 June
Silver	Liew Zeng Wye	Swimming	Men's 400 m individual medley	27 June
Silver	Lye Lik Zang; Fahman Arasy Ayub; Mukhriez Shah Mahmood Shah; Eshwant Singh	Chess	Men's team (Rapid)	28 June
Silver	Lye Lik Zang	Chess	Men's individual (Rapid)	28 Jun
Silver	Phee Jinq En	Swimming	Women's 200 m breaststroke	28 June
Silver	Siti Roha Miszuraini	Judo	Women's +78 kg	28 June
Silver	Ho Hoong Shen; Jayson Shu Wen Lee; John Tang Jun Kai; Wan Yu Hong	3x3 basketball	Men's team	28 June
Silver	Terence Ng Shin Jian	Swimming	Men's 200 m freestyle	29 June
Silver	Hii Puong Wei	Swimming	Men's 200 m individual medley	29 June
Silver	Bryan Leong Xin Ren; Ng Tze Xiang; Terence Ng Shin Jian; Tan Khai Xin	Swimming	Men's 4×100 m freestyle relay	29 June
Silver	Yi Xing Ung; Xin Jie Lee; Valerie Zi Xuan Siow; Saranya Navaratnajah; Ng Qi Xuan; Desiree Hao Shan Siow; Nur Ernisa Alya Zainal Abidin	Badminton	Women's team	29 June
Silver	Amir Daniel Abdul Majid; Muhammad Hakimi Halidon; Md Nashriq Md Nassir; Siti Roha Miszuraini	Judo	Mixed team	29 June
Silver	Zulkifli Abu Hassan Zali; Muhammad Amin Najmie Al Hafeez; Ahmad Azrai Afiq Awang; Muhammad Haiqal Hasnor; Muhammad Harith Hazami; Muhammad Harith Hazlan; Muhammad Aidil Izwan Mazlan; Muhammad Syarifuddin Md Akhir; Ahmad Atif Numan Mohd Azhar; Norharis Muzammil Norhanan; Muhammad Anas Aqasya Razman; Muhammad Arif Roslan; Muhammad Bukhari Samsudin; Irfan Rifqi Shahrul Nizam	Futsal	Men's team	30 June
Silver	Liew Zeng Wye	Swimming	Men's 200 m butterfly	1 July
Silver	Lye Lik Zang; Fahman Arasy Ayub; Mukhriez Shah Mahmood Shah; Muhammad Hafizuddin Zulkifli	Chess	Men's team (Standard)	1 July
Silver	Hooi Shao Herng	Badminton	Men's singles	2 July
Silver	Lee Xin Jie; Valeree Siow Zi Xuan	Badminton	Women's doubles	2 July
Silver	Kamal Farhan A. Rahman	Athletics	Men's discus throw	2 July
Silver	Mandy Goh Li	Athletics	Women's 400 m hurdles	2 July
Silver	Muhammad Azeem Fahmi	Athletics	Men's 100 m	2 July
Silver	Nadia Aina Syazwani Ishak	Taekwondo	Women's kyorugi -67 kg	2 July
Silver	Nurrul Ainin Syauqina Mohd Nor Azahar	Athletics	Women's shot put	3 July
Silver	Anas Ariffin	Athletics	Men's 1500 m	3 July
Silver	Nur Humaira Abdul Karim	Taekwondo	Women's individual poomsae	3 July
Silver	Muhammad Haffiez Daud	Pencak silat	Men's Tunggal	4 July
Silver	Aisyah Umairah Mohd Rosbi; Wan Nurain Fakhira Wan Azli	Pencak silat	Women's Ganda	4 July
Silver	Andre Anura Anuar	Athletics	Men's triple jump	4 July
Silver	Ng Jing Xuan	Athletics	Women's javelin throw	4 July
Silver	Nurul Ashikin Abas	Athletics	Women's triple jump	4 July
Silver	Farrell Glenn Felix Jurus	Athletics	Men's high jump	4 July
Silver	Nur Hanisah Zulkifli	Pencak silat	Women's class F	5 July
Silver	Kamal Farhan A. Rahman	Athletics	Men's shot put	5 July
Silver	Fu Cern Put Thai	Taekwondo	Men's kyorugi -58 kg	5 July
Silver	Antony Luke Jarrod; Chan Yew Thung; Ho Hoong Shen; Kua Yee Luen; Jayson Lee Shu Wen; Lim Chee Wei; Ooi Zi Jing; Pan Zheng Hao; John Tang Jun Kai; Brian Tang Kia Wee; Thea Zhong Shin; Wan Yu Hong	Basketball	Men's team	5 July
Silver	Dennis Lim Kai Xiang; Song Chan Zhen; Yong Kojiro	Karate	Men's team Kata	5 July
Silver	Lim Hui Ling; Phng Lebin; Madeline Wong Mei Ge	Karate	Women's team Kata	5 July
Silver	Fahmi Mifzal Fuad	Pencak silat	Men's class E	6 July
Silver	Muhammad Irsyad Zulkipli	Pencak silat	Men's class H	6 July
Silver	Muhammad Aiman Azlan; Sureeya Sankar Hari Sankar; Thevendran Kaliana Sundram; Kamarul Sabarudin; Muhammad Arash Sirajudeen; Geerijaieswaran Pillai Sivanesan; Pavithran Pillai Sivanesan	Karate	Men's team Kumite	6 July
Silver	Muhammad Farhan Hakimi A. Rhyme	Archery	Men's individual recurve bow	6 July
Silver	Muhammad Farhan Hakimi A. Rhyme; Muhammad Hafiyzul Hadi Haidi; Muhammad Haziq Khalil	Archery	Men's team recurve bow	6 July
Silver	Nur Ain Ayuni Fozi; Nurul Izzah Mazlan; Nur Rafiqa Izzlyn Zaidi	Archery	Women's team recurve bow	6 July
Silver	Muhammad Farhan Hakimi A. Rhyme; Nur Rafiqa Izzlyn Zaidi	Archery	Mixed team recurve bow	6 July
Silver	Mohamad Syafiq Md Ariffin	Archery	Men's individual compound bow	6 July
Silver	Nurul Izzah Mazlan; Nur Nisa Aliya Muhamad Radzif	Archery	Mixed team compound bow	6 July
Bronze	Bryan Leong Xin Ren	Swimming	Men's 50 m breaststroke	26 June
Bronze	Hii Puong Wei	Swimming	Men's 200 m backstroke	26 June
Bronze	Chu Xin Ying; Jerriel Lau; Georgene Wee Ee Jern; Wong Shi Qi	Swimming	Women's 4×200 m freestyle relay	26 June
Bronze	Tan Yi Ting	Judo	Men's -73 kg	27 June
Bronze	Puteri Munajjah Az-Zahraa Azhar; Puteri Rifqah Fahada Azhar; Chua Jia Tien; Nithyalakshmi Sivanesan	Chess	Women's team (Blitz)	27 June
Bronze	Lye Lik Zang	Chess	Men's individual (Blitz)	27 June
Bronze	Georgene Wee Ee Jern	Swimming	Women's 400 m individual medley	27 June
Bronze	Wong Shi Qi	Swimming	Women's 50 m butterfly	27 June
Bronze	Georgene Wee Ee Jern	Swimming	Women's 800 m freestyle	27 June
Bronze	Puteri Munajjah Az-Zahraa Azhar; Puteri Rifqah Fahada Azhar; Chua Jia Tien; Nithyalakshmi Sivanesan	Chess	Women's team (Rapid)	28 June
Bronze	Nithyalakshmi Sivanesan	Chess	Women's individual (Rapid)	28 June
Bronze	Chu Xin Ying; Ng Zi Syuen; Georgene Wee Ee Jern; Wong Shi Qi	Swimming	Women's 4x100 m freestyle relay	28 June
Bronze	Nur Nisa Nadhirah Mohd Tirmeezy; Nur Asyikin Roslan; Sharifah Aqilah Farhana Syed Ali	Petanque	Women's triples	28 June
Bronze	Muhammad Fakhrul Hadi Azley; Mohamad Muqri Arif Mohamad Sapiny; Syed Afiq Fakhri Syed Ali	Petanque	Men's triples	28 June
Bronze	Er Zi Jie; Emily Tan Qi Yi; Wong Chah Yee; Yun Jia Huey	3x3 basketball	Women's team	28 June
Bronze	Tan Khai Xin	Swimming	Men's 200 m freestyle	29 June
Bronze	Hii Puong Wei	Swimming	Men's 100 m breaststroke	29 June
Bronze	Christy Teh Xing Ti	Swimming	Women's 200 m individual medley	29 June
Bronze	Shao Herng Hooi; Xun Liew; Tien Ci Wong; Anson Yan Feng Cheong; Muhammad Fazriq Mohamad Razif; Yee Hern Wee; M. Mohd Nazri	Badminton	Men's team	29 June
Bronze	Terence Ng Shin Jian	Swimming	Men's 100 m freestyle	30 June
Bronze	Liew Zeng Wye	Swimming	Men's 1500 m freestyle	30 June
Bronze	Christy Teh Xing Ti; Lee Yen Yi; Ho Keesha; Ng Zi Syuen	Swimming	Women's 4×100 m medley relay	30 June
Bronze	Bryan Leong Xin Ren	Swimming	Men's 50 m freestyle	1 July
Bronze	Georgene Wee Ee Jern	Swimming	Women's 200 m butterfly	1 July
Bronze	Bryan Leong Xin Ren; Hii Puong Wei; Terence Ng Shin Jian; Tan Khai Xin	Swimming	Men's 4×100 m medley relay	1 July
Bronze	Lye Lik Zang	Chess	Men's individual (Standard)	1 July
Bronze	Puteri Munajjah Az-Zahraa Azhar; Puteri Rifqah Fahada Azhar; Chua Jia Tien; Nithyalakshmi Sivanesan	Chess	Women's team (Standard)	1 July
Bronze	Puteri Munajjah Az-Zahraa Azhar	Chess	Women's individual (Standard)	1 July
Bronze	Ung Yi Xing	Badminton	Women's singles	2 July
Bronze	Frenynila Sherly Lucius	Athletics	Women's 400 m hurdles	2 July
Bronze	Ruslem Zikry Putra Roseli	Athletics	Men's 400 m hurdles	2 July
Bronze	Jason Loo Jun Wei	Taekwondo	Men's individual poomsae	2 July
Bronze	Haziq Bistaman	Pencak silat	Men's class J	2 July
Bronze	Fu Ceen Put Thai	Taekwondo	Men's kyorugi -63 kg	3 July
Bronze	Mohammad Azim Azizul; Ahmad Badrie Amin Azmi; Muhammad Faisal Mohd Fuad; Muhamad Faris Syahmi Mohd Jamsari; Mohamad Nazhan Noor Zamri; Nur Haziq Norali	Sepak takraw	Men's Quard	3 July
Bronze	Muhammad Naufal Shahrul Afzam	Athletics	Men's pole vault	3 July
Bronze	Nurul Ashikin Abas	Athletics	Women's long jump	3 July
Bronze	Azreen Nabila Alias; Nur Aishah Rofina Aling; Chelsea Cassiopea Evali Bopulas; Nurul Wardatul Huwaida Mohd Hamka	Athletics	Women's 4×100 m relay	3 July
Bronze	Nurul Ain Husna Razali	Pencak silat	Women's class B	3 July
Bronze	Nur Farizy Rozali	Pencak silat	Women's class D	3 July
Bronze	Nur Thaqilah Abu Shah	Pencak silat	Women's class E	3 July
Bronze	Tarmizi Asmin	Pencak silat	Men's class A	3 July
Bronze	Muhammad Fadhilah Izhar Tajudin	Pencak silat	Men's class C	3 July
Bronze	Muhammad Shahrul Imran	Pencak silat	Men's class I	3 July
Bronze	Sriven Tan	Athletics	Men's 20 km race walk	4 July
Bronze	Muhammad Rafieqqie Danish Md Roshidi	Taekwondo	Men's kyorugi -68 kg	4 July
Bronze	Lovelly Anne Robberth	Karate	Women's individual Kata	4 July
Bronze	Yong Kojiro	Karate	Men's individual Kata	4 July
Bronze	Amirah Syahirah Azlan	Karate	Women's −68 kg Kumite	4 July
Bronze	Muhammad Arash Sirajudeen	Karate	Men's −84 kg Kumite	4 July
Bronze	Pavithran Pillai Sivanesan	Karate	Men's −75 kg Kumite	4 July
Bronze	Nurul Fara Kartika Dasiman	Pencak silat	Women's class C	4 July
Bronze	Rosita Lua Jabing	Athletics	Women's high jump	5 July
Bronze	Nurul Hidayah Lukman	Athletics	Women's hammer throw	5 July
Bronze	Muhammad Luqman Haqim Mohd Suhaimi	Taekwondo	Men's kyorugi +87 kg	5 July
Bronze	Chow Mei Ling; Er Zi Jie; Fu Yik Lyn; Hin Jia Wei; Nur Adila Shahira Juraimi; Koh Hui Ling; Lee Li Xuan; Ng Jing Xuan; Emily Tan Qiyi; Wong Chah Yee; Yap Jia Wei; Yap Shi Qi	Basketball	Women's team	5 July
Bronze	Madhuri Poovanesan	Karate	Women's −55 kg Kumite	5 July
Bronze	Shahmalarani Chandran	Karate	Women's −50 kg Kumite	5 July
Bronze	Amirah Syahirah Azlan; Shahmalarani Chandran; Siti Nur Azwani Nor Azli; Madhuri Puvanesan	Karate	Women's team Kumite	6 July
Bronze	Hoo Ee Jean	Taekwondo	Men's kyorugi −49 kg	6 July
Bronze	Nur Nisa Aliya Muhamad Radzif	Archery	Women's individual compound bow	6 July
Bronze	Mohammad Azim Azizul; Ahmad Badrie Amin Azmi; Muhammad Faisal Mohd Fuad; Muhamad Faris Syahmi Mohd Jamsari; Mohamad Nazhan Noor Zamri; Nur Haziq Norali; Muhammad Haikal Huzaimi Abd Razak; Najmi Syahfiq Anuar; Muhammad Imran Mohd Fazli; Amir Syahiran Mohd Fuzi; Muhamad Faris Syahmi Mohd Jamsari; Zuhri Muhammad Zin; Khairul Hafifi Tajudin; Wan Firdhaus Wan Omar; Muhammad Aiman Hakim Zakari	Sepak takraw	Men's team	6 July

== Badminton ==
=== Singles ===
Athlete	Event	Qualifying round	Semifinal	Final / BM	
Athlete	Event	Opposition Score	Opposition Score	Opposition Score	Rank
Anson Yan Feng Cheong	Men's singles	Fiery Mufti Eldison (INA); W 2–1	Nachakorn Pusri (THA); L 0–2	Puritat Arree (THA); L	4
Shao Herng Hooi	Men's singles	Lim Melcom Yang Zh (SGP); W 2–0	Puritat Arree (THA); W 2–1	Nachakorn Pusri (THA); L	2nd place, silver medalist(s)
Saranya Navaratnarajah	Women's singles	Wu Joanna Chujia (SGP); W 2–0	Pornpicha Choeikeewong (THA); L 0–2	Yi Xing Ung (MAS); L	4
Yi Xing Ung	Women's singles	Ashley Lee Shi Hui (SGP); W 2–0	Aisyah Sativa Fatetani (INA); L 0–2	Saranya Navaratnarajah (MAS); L	3rd place, bronze medalist(s)

=== Doubles ===
Athlete	Event	Qualifying round	Semifinal	Final / BM	
Athlete	Event	Opposition Score	Opposition Score	Opposition Score	Rank
Muhammad Fazriq Mohamad Razif; Yee Hern Wee	Men's doubles	Muhammad Juan Elgiffani / Reza Dwicahya (INA); L 0–2	Did not advance		
Tien Ci Wong; Xun Liew	Men's doubles	Adam Putra Wahyu / Gerardo Rizqullah Hafidz (INA); W 2–1	Neuaduang Mangkornloi / Paramet Promsarin (THA); W 2–0	Muhammad Juan Elgiffani / Reza Dwicahya (INA); W	1st place, gold medalist(s)
Desiree Hao Shan Siow; Ng Qi Xuan	Women's doubles	Atitaya Povanon / Chasinee Korepap (THA); L 0–2	Did not advance		
Valeree Siow; Xin Jie Lee	Women's doubles	Tiara Mahsela / Windy Aulia Putri (INA); W 2–0	Pattaraporn Rungruengpramong / Pichamon Phatcharaphisutsin (THA); W 2–0	Atitaya Povanon / Chasinee Korepap (THA); L	2nd place, silver medalist(s)
Tien Ci Wong; Valeree Siow	Mixed doubles	Neuaduang Mangkornloi / Atitaya Povanon (THA); L 0–2	Did not advance		
Yee Hern Wee; Ng Qi Xuan	Mixed doubles	Vichayapong Kanjanakeereewong / Chasinee Korepap (THA); W 2–1	Gerardo Rizqullah Hafidz / Tryola Nadia (INA); W 2–0	Muhammad Juan Elgiffani / Elizabeth Jovita (INA); W	1st place, gold medalist(s)

=== Team ===
Team	Event	Qualifying round				Final / BM	
Team	Event	Opposition Score	Opposition Score	Opposition Score	Rank	Opposition Score	Rank
Shao Herng Hooi; Xun Liew; Tien Ci Wong; Anson Yan Feng Cheong; Muhammad Fazriq Mohamad Razif; Yee Hern Wee; M. Mohd Nazri	Men's team	Singapore; W 5–0	Indonesia; L 2–3	Thailand; L 2–3	3 Q	Singapore; W 3–0	3rd place, bronze medalist(s)
Yi Xing Ung; Xin Jie Lee; Valeree Siow; Saranya Navaratnajah; Ng Qi Xuan; Desiree Hao Shan Siow; Nur Ernisa Alya Zainal Abidin	Women's team	Indonesia; W 3–2	Thailand; L 1–4	Singapore; W 5–0	2 Q	Thailand; L 0–3	2nd place, silver medalist(s)

== Basketball ==
Team	Event	Qualifying round					Final / BM	
Team	Event	Opposition Score	Opposition Score	Opposition Score	Opposition Score	Rank	Opposition Score	Rank
Malaysia men's	Men's team	Philippines; L 79–93	Indonesia; L 96–98	Thailand; W 95–87	Singapore; W 82–77	2 Q	Philippines; L 64–93	2nd place, silver medalist(s)
Malaysia women's	Women's team	Thailand; L 51–89	Indonesia; L 44–64	Singapore; W 61–53	—N/a	3 Q	Singapore; W 66–43	3rd place, bronze medalist(s)

=== 3x3 basketball ===
Team	Event	Qualifying round					Semifinal	Final / BM	
Team	Event	Opposition Score	Opposition Score	Opposition Score	Opposition Score	Rank	Opposition Score	Opposition Score	Rank
Ho Hoong Shen; Jayson Shu Wen Lee; John Tang Jun Kai; Wan Yu Hong	Men's team	Laos; W 21–8	Philippines; L 17–21	Brunei; W 22–3	Indonesia; W 21–16	2 Q	Laos; W 21–9	Philippines; L 18–21	2nd place, silver medalist(s)
Yun Jia Huey; Emily Tan Qiyi; Er Zi Jie; Wong Chah Yee	Women's team	Singapore; L 12–21	Laos; W 21–5	Indonesia; L 13–14	—N/a	3 Q	Indonesia; L 16–21	Laos; W 21–6	3rd place, bronze medalist(s)

== Futsal ==
Team	Event	Group Stage			Semifinal	Final / BM	
Team	Event	Opposition Score	Opposition Score	Rank	Opposition Score	Opposition Score	Rank
Malaysia men's	Men's team	Indonesia; L 2–3	Myanmar; W 6–1	2 Q	Thailand; W 4(5)–4(4)	Indonesia; L 1–4	2nd place, silver medalist(s)

== Handball ==
Team	Event	Group Stage			Semifinal	Final / BM	
Team	Event	Opposition Score	Opposition Score	Rank	Opposition Score	Opposition Score	Rank
Malaysia men's	Men's team	Singapore; D 25–25	Indonesia; W 29–28	1 Q	—N/a	Singapore; W 28–26	1st place, gold medalist(s)
