= Typhoon Kammuri =

Pacific typhoon in 2019

Typhoon Kammuri (Tisoy)
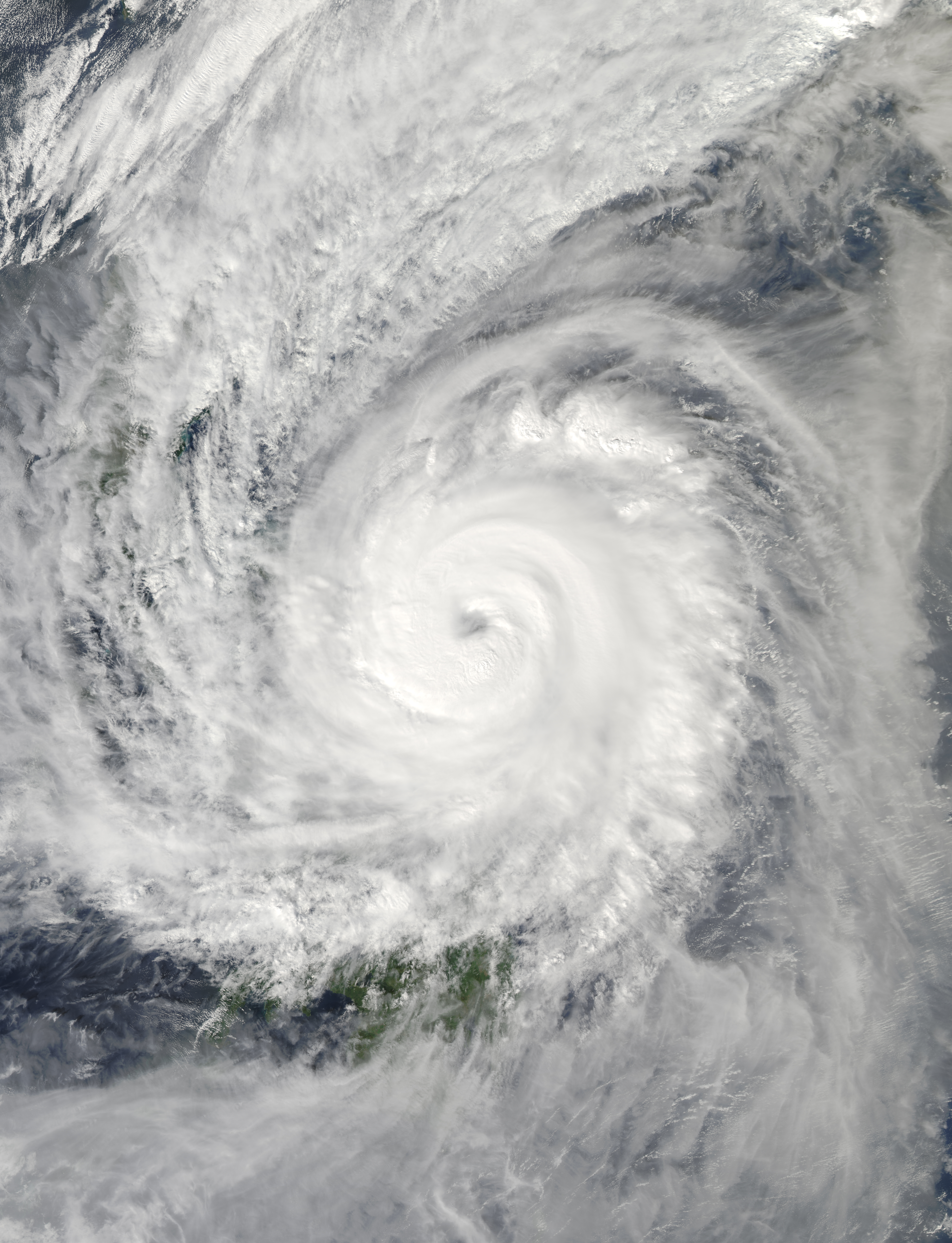
- Kammuri shortly before attaining peak intensity on December 2

Meteorological history
- Formed: November 24, 2019
- Dissipated: December 6, 2019

Very strong typhoon
- 10-minute sustained (JMA)
- Highest winds: 165 km/h (105 mph)
- Lowest pressure: 950 hPa (mbar); 28.05 inHg

Category 4-equivalent typhoon
- 1-minute sustained (SSHWS/JTWC)
- Highest winds: 220 km/h (140 mph)
- Lowest pressure: 938 hPa (mbar); 27.70 inHg

Overall effects
- Fatalities: 17
- Injuries: 318
- Missing: 2
- Damage: $130 million (2019 USD)
- Areas affected: Philippines
- IBTrACS
- Part of the 2019 Pacific typhoon season

Typhoon Kammuri, (Note: The name Kammuri was contributed by Japan (Japanese: カンムリ, [kã̠mːɯ̟ɾʲi]) and refers to the constellation Corona Borealis, the northern crown, in Japanese.) locally named Tisoy, (Note: The Japan Meteorological Agency (JMA) assigns names to typhoons in the western Pacific Ocean and north of the equator, as the Regional Specialized Meteorological Centre. For the Philippines, its weather bureau PAGASA assigns local names to tropical cyclones that enter its self-defined area, which is known as the Philippine Area of Responsibility.) was a powerful typhoon which impacted the Philippines in early December 2019. Kammuri was the twenty-eighth named storm and sixteenth typhoon of the 2019 Pacific typhoon season, Kammuri developed from a tropical wave situated a couple hundred kilometers south of the Mariana Islands.

From November 25 to 27, the system tracked westward at a steady pace and rate of intensification, first making minor impacts in Guam. On November 28, the system intensified into a typhoon as environmental conditions became marginally conducive for significant development. From November 29 to December 1, Kammuri was unable to strengthen to previous estimates due to its near stationary movement as a result of weak steering currents, upwelling itself consequently. On December 2, the system tracked westward at a much faster speed of 19 km/h (12 mph) and rapidly intensified over warm Philippine Sea waters, before making landfall in the Bicol Region of the Philippines at peak intensity as a category 4-equivalent typhoon.

Upon leaving the Philippines, Kammuri significantly weakened as wind shear increased and interaction with the Philippine islands caused the structure of the system to degrade rapidly, and throughout December 3, it stayed as a category 1-equivalent typhoon, with its outer rainbands barely on land. By December 4, Kammuri drifted over the South China Sea as a weakening tropical storm. Through December 5 and 6, Kammuri weakened significantly and its low-level circulation center became exposed; as a result, it dissipated on December 6.

== Meteorological history ==
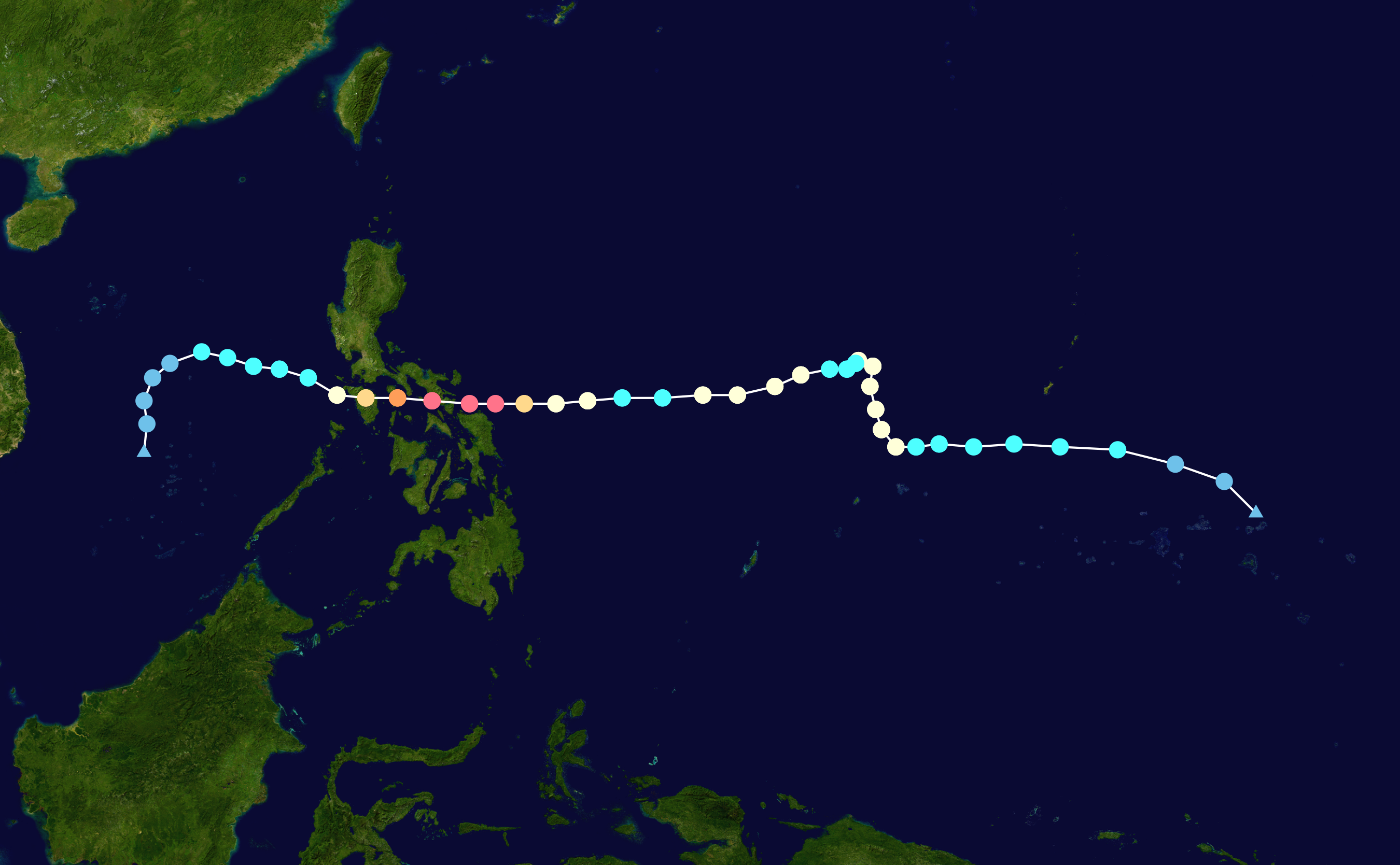
Map plotting the storm's track and intensity, according to the Saffir–Simpson scale Map key Saffir–Simpson scale Tropical depression (≤38 mph, ≤62 km/h) Tropical storm (39–73 mph, 63–118 km/h) Category 1 (74–95 mph, 119–153 km/h) Category 2 (96–110 mph, 154–177 km/h) Category 3 (111–129 mph, 178–208 km/h) Category 4 (130–156 mph, 209–251 km/h) Category 5 (≥157 mph, ≥252 km/h) Unknown Storm type Tropical cyclone Subtropical cyclone Extratropical cyclone, remnant low, tropical disturbance, or monsoon depression

On November 23, 2019, a low pressure system developed to the southeast of Guam. It then began to show signs of development and earned a defined circulation, developing into a tropical depression on November 25, with the JTWC assigning it as 29W. The depression then began to develop banding features to the northeast of its center, confirming intensification and allowing it to earn the name Kammuri (which is a Japanese name for Corona Borealis). Kammuri then passed south of Guam, and further intensified into a severe tropical storm on November 27, and then into a typhoon the next day. As the weak typhoon continued west, upwelling of itself due to its quasi-stationary movement combined with moderate wind shear hindered significant intensification of Kammuri over the next three days. It eventually entered the Philippine Area of Responsibility (PAR) with PAGASA assigning the name Tisoy on November 30. After entering the PAGASA's area of responsibility, Kammuri began to show signs of intensification again, and PAGASA noted the possibility of Kammuri making landfall in the Philippines as a somewhat powerful typhoon. After very slowly moving west and on approach to the Philippines, the system began to accelerate towards the Philippines and then began to rapidly intensify by the time it came within 321 kilometers of the coast of Catanduanes, due to the lowering of wind shear and increasing ocean heat content; all of which combined to counteract the upwelling. It became a category 2 typhoon and soon after, a category 3 typhoon. Kammuri reached its peak intensity as a 220 km/h category 4-equivalent typhoon on 07:00 UTC on December 2, and PAGASA reported that Kammuri had made its first landfall over Gubat, Sorsogon at 11:00 pm, December 2, very shortly after reaching its peak intensity.

Typhoon Kammuri crossing through the Philippines during the morning of December 3.

Through midnight and early morning of December 3, Kammuri crossed the Bicol Region and weakened due to land interaction. It made another landfall at 4:00 am PST over San Pascual town on Burias Island. Moving in a generally westward direction, Kammuri weakened into a Category 3 after land interaction and developed a new eye, moving very close to the Bondoc Peninsula before making its third and fourth landfalls at 8:30 am PST over Torrijos, Marinduque and at 12:30 pm PST over Naujan, Oriental Mindoro, respectively. Continued land interaction weakened Kammuri to a Category 2-equivalent typhoon before it exited the Philippine landmass. The center of the typhoon was reported to be over the Mindoro Strait by late afternoon. Soon after, the system continued to weaken and became a Category 1-equivalent typhoon as it entered the South China Sea. Kammuri's structure then began to suffer, with wind shear tearing apart convection on the western portion of the storm as it weakened back into a tropical storm while drifting over the South China Sea. By 11:00 am PST, December 5, PAGASA issued its last bulletin on Kammuri as it exited the PAR. Kammuri lost its inner rainbands and its low-level circulation center became exposed to high wind shear, causing the system to dissipate on December 6 with the JMA issuing its final advisory on the system.

== Preparations ==
=== Highest Tropical Cyclone Wind Signal ===
Highest Tropical Cyclone Wind Signal issued by PAGASA for Kammuri (Tisoy) in each province.

PSWS#	Luzon	Visayas	Mindanao
3	Batangas, Cavite, Laguna, Central and Southern Portions of Quezon, Catanduanes, Camarines Sur, Albay, Sorsogon, Southern Portion of Camarines Norte, Masbate, Burias Island, Ticao Island, Marinduque, Occidental Mindoro, Oriental Mindoro, Romblon, Lubang Islands	Northern Portion of Eastern Samar, Northern Portion of Samar, Northern Samar	None
2	Pangasinan, Aurora, Bataan, Bulacan, Nueva Ecija, Pampanga, Tarlac, Zambales, Metro Manila, Rizal, Rest of Quezon, Polillo Islands, Calamian Islands, Cuyo Islands	Aklan, Antique, Capiz, Guimaras, Iloilo, Bantayan Islands, Camotes Islands, Northern Portion of Cebu, Northern Portion of Negros Occidental, Leyte, Rest of Eastern Samar, Rest of Samar	None
1	Ilocos Sur, La Union, Nueva Vizcaya, Quirino, Southern Portion of Isabela, Benguet, Ifugao, Mountain Province, Rest of Aurora, Northern Portion of Palawan	Bohol, Rest of Cebu, Rest of Negros Occidental, Negros Oriental, Siquijor, Southern Leyte	Dinagat Islands, Siargao Islands

At their 119th Climate Forum, PAGASA discussed the possible threat of Kammuri to the Philippines and the potential landfall of Kammuri in the Bicol Region during the 2019 Southeast Asian Games as a powerful typhoon. On November 28, PAGASA stated in a press conference that appropriate measures and linkaging with the 2019 SEA Games organizers have been in place in preparation for the typhoon, such as storm chasers and mobile radars dispatched to competition venues in Metro Manila and Central Luzon. SEA Games organizers also reported that a contingency plan has been set up in preparation for Kammuri. By the afternoon of November 30, the day of the opening of the SEA Games, the agency assigned Kammuri with the local name Tisoy as it entered the Philippine Area of Responsibility (PAR) and raised its first warnings over Eastern Samar and Northern Samar provinces.

On November 30, local governments in Bicol Region started preparing in anticipation of Kammuri's arrival. Tropical Cyclone Warning Signals (TCWS) #1, 2 and 3 warnings were issued as the storm began to come close to Luzon on December 2. Throughout the same day, more warning signals were raised in some areas in the Visayas region. TCWS #1 was raised in the province of Antique and therefore, suspended classes in a total of 14 towns. Some of the suspensions were issued for all levels while others were only from pre-school to senior high. Local governments throughout Eastern Visayas declared suspension of classes in all levels along with work. Provinces such as Northern Samar, Samar, Eastern Samar and Biliran were raised to a TCWS #2 while Leyte and Southern Leyte only had a TCWS #2. In Cebu, TCWS #2 was also alerted which prompted 7,376 people to evacuate. Over 200,000 people were evacuated ahead of Kammuri due to fears of flooding and landslides. Flights and operations at Ninoy Aquino International Airport were suspended for twelve hours starting at 11:00 p.m. PST on December 3, 2019, and ending at 11:00 a.m. on December 4. 16 flights were cancelled at Mactan–Cebu International Airport on December 2. A total of 358 domestic flights and 203 international flights were cancelled due to Kammuri.

== Impact and aftermath ==
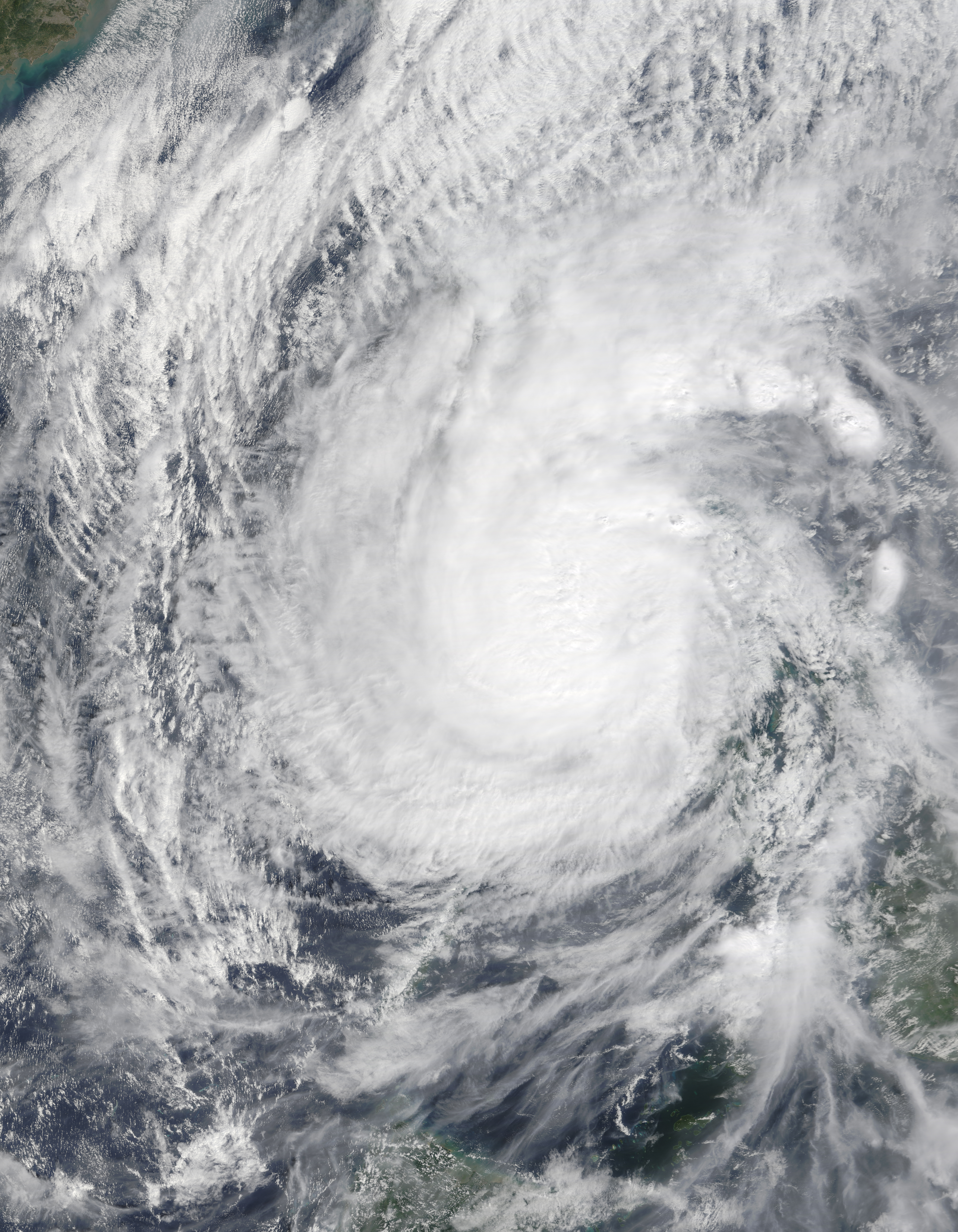
Typhoon Kammuri weakening on December 3

In the 12th severe weather bulletin issued by PAGASA on December 2, 2019, reported that prior to its first landfall, the southern eyewall of Typhoon Kammuri brought violent winds and intense rainfall over the neighboring province of Northern Samar. Photos and video footage from the towns of Mapanas and Gamay, both located on Northern Samar's Pacific side, show severe flooding and high winds from the typhoon. Hours later, Kammuri made its first landfall near Gubat, Sorsogon with winds equivalent to a Category 4 hurricane. In Northern Samar, winds were reported to reach as up to 135 km/h (85 mph) with a total accumulated rainfall of 605.5 mm (23.84 in) within the course of 24 hours on December 2.

The Bicol Region (Region V) was impacted the most by the typhoon. After the passage of the storm, roads between regions, especially routes from the Bicol Region towards Manila were not passable due to fallen branches and uproot trees. Several vehicles and passengers were stranded along highways due to this. On December 4, the provinces of Albay and Sorsogon, and the city of Naga were issued a state of calamity after widespread damages were seen. The region's Department of Social Welfare and Development (DSWD) estimated that an estimated 130,000 children were affected by the storm. In Camarines Sur, about 293 classrooms suffered from major damages while the province of Albay had a total of 883 classrooms damaged as of December 5. By December 6, Catanduanes experienced heavy damages and therefore, a state of calamity was issued.

On December 4, Northern Samar's Province Disaster Risk Reduction and Management Council (PDRRMC) recommended a state of calamity, and shortly after, it was raised in two towns: Catarman and Gamay. Massive destruction along with widespread flooding, damaged houses, landslides and even weak communication signal prompted their local government to issue the state of calamity in the two towns. 224,171 individuals were affected by Kammuri (Tisoy) in Northern Samar, and based on post-disaster assessment, about 28,577 houses were damages while an additional 3,774 were washed out by extreme flooding. Power outages were seen in many villages, and the Northern Samar Electric Cooperative stated that power supply would be restored in Catarman and nearby towns by Christmas Day, but other towns could still suffer from no power until after Christmas. Moreover, Kammuri's rain bands extended to as far north as Cagayan Valley, where, with the inclusion of the northeastern monsoon, saw one of the worst flooding in decades for the northern region. Roughly 66,000 people have evacuated their homes due to extreme flooding and torrential flooding. On December 6, state of calamity was raised. Severe flooding in 18 areas in the province damaged agriculture and paralyzed transportation.

As of January 22, 2020, the NDRRMC stated that at least 17 people were dead and at least 318 were injured. There has been an estimated damages of ₱6.65 billion (US$130 million) across the nation and about ₱95.7 million (US$1.87 million) to relief efforts and assistance. Totals of 2,249 damaged schools and 558,844 damaged houses, of which 63,466 were "totally" damaged, were reported. 121 road sections and 5 bridges were damaged due to Kammuri, of which six road sections and one bridge were still considered impassable a week after landfall.

=== Sporting tournaments ===
The 2019 Southeast Asian Games, held in the Philippines that year, had several matches and events either cancelled or rescheduled due to Kammuri. Ramon Agregado, the organizing committee's head of the Subic cluster of venues, stated, "The windsurfing has been cancelled until we have a more accurate picture of the weather." Duathlon events that were scheduled for Tuesday, December 3, took place on Monday, December 2.

Occidental Mindoro also withdrew as hosts of the 2020 Palarong Pambansa, the national students sports competition of the Philippines, due to damage caused by Kammuri in the province.

== Retirement ==
As the typhoon caused over ₱1 billion in damage, PAGASA officially retired the name Tisoy from the rotating lists and it will never be used again as a typhoon within the Philippine Area of Responsibility (PAR). It was replaced by Tamaraw, which went unused in 2023.

The name Kammuri was also retired during the 52nd annual session of the ESCAP/WMO Typhoon Committee in February 2020. In February 2021, the Typhoon Committee subsequently chose Koto as its replacement name.

== See also ==
- Weather of 2019
- Tropical cyclones in 2019
- Typhoon Chanchu (2006)
- Typhoon Xangsane (2006)
- Typhoon Durian (2006)
- Typhoon Rammasun (2014)
- Typhoon Koppu (2015)
- Typhoon Melor (2015)
- Typhoon Nock-ten (2016)
- Typhoon Phanfone (2019) – Another major typhoon that struck the Central Philippines weeks later.
- Typhoon Vongfong (2020)
- Typhoon Molave (2020)
- Typhoon Goni (2020)
- Typhoon Man-yi (2024)
