= Pengiran Muda Bahar =

Bruneian prince (born 1981)

Bahar بحر
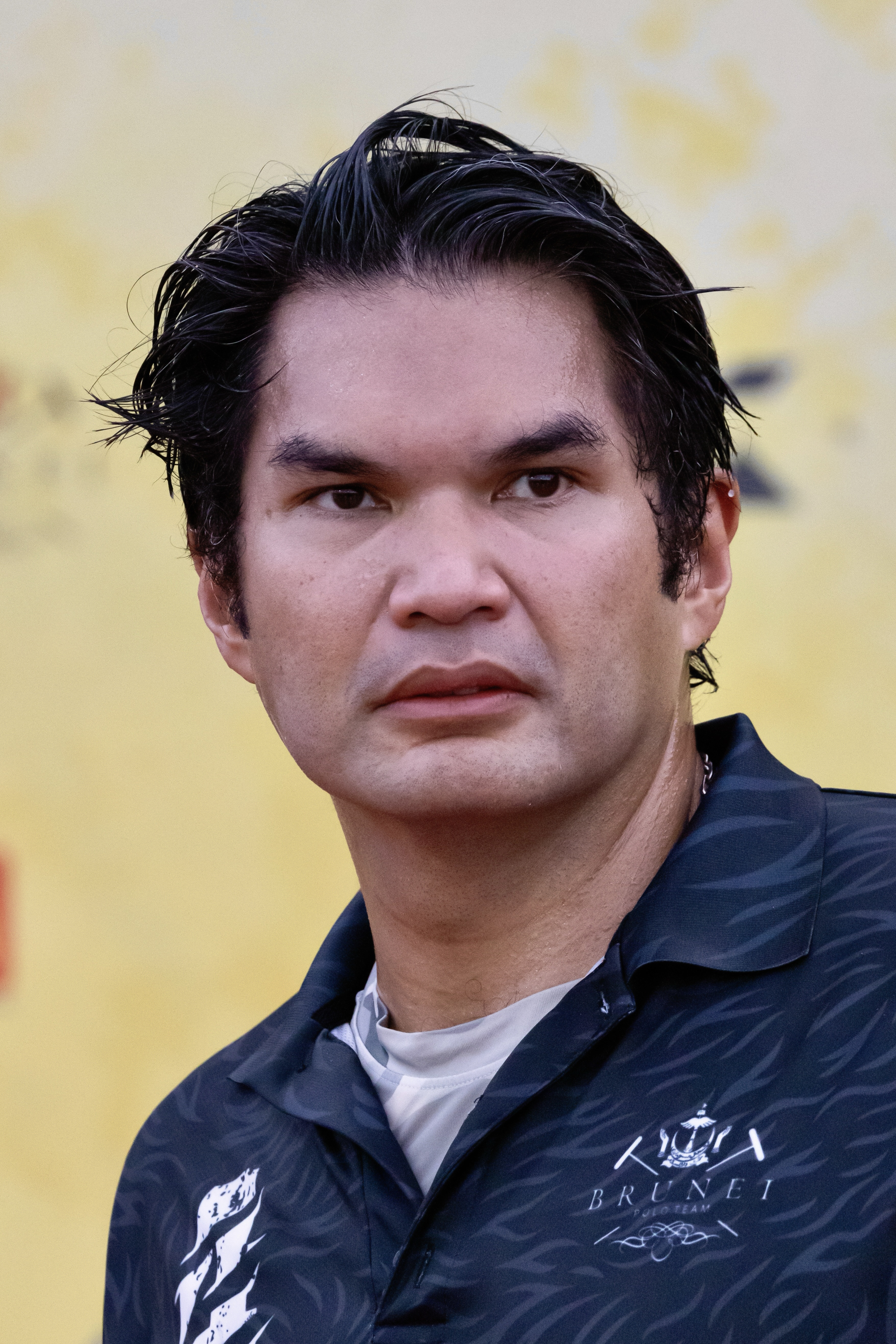
- Bahar in 2024
- Born: 20 August 1981 (age 45); Brunei
- Spouse: Princess Azemah (m. 2023)
- House: Bolkiah
- Father: Jefri Bolkiah
- Mother: Norhayati binti Abdul Rahman
- Religion: Sunni Islam
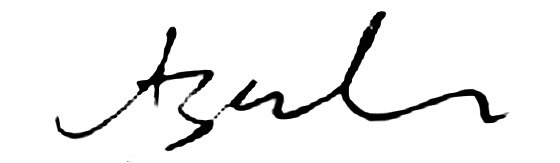
- Signature
- Sports career
- Country: Brunei
- Sport: Polo
Medal record
SEA Games
Bronze medal – third place	2017 Kuala Lumpur	Men's tournament
Bronze medal – third place	2019 Calatagan	Men's tournament
Silver medal – second place	2025 Bangkok	Mixed 2-4 Goals
Bronze medal – third place	2025 Bangkok	Mixed 4-6 Goals

Bahar ibni Jefri Bolkiah (Jawi: بحر; born 20 August 1981) is a member of the royal family of Brunei. He is the second son of Prince Jefri and the husband of Princess Azemah.

== Early life ==
Bahar was born on 20 August 1981 to Prince Jefri Bolkiah and his first wife Pengiran Anak Isteri Norhayati binti Pengiran Jaya Negara Pengiran Haji Abdul Rahman. His has two older full siblings, Abdul Hakeem, and Hamidah Jamalul along with at least fourteen half siblings from his father's other relationships. He was reportedly given $400 million on his sixteenth birthday.

== Marriage ==
Pengiran Muda Bahar and Princess Azemah were wed on 12 January 2023. An Islamic ceremony in the Omar Ali Saifuddien Mosque, a Royal Powdering Ceremony, and a banquet at the Sultan's palace were just a few of the activities that took place during the wedding's week-long celebration. At the palace's Balai Singgahsana Indera Buana, they held their Berbedak Pengantin Diraja ceremony, according to all royal traditions. The royal families of Pahang and Johor as well as the mother of the bride were present, most notably Tengku Muhammad Iskandar Ri'ayatuddin Shah and Tunku Idris Iskandar.

== Sports career ==
He is regarded as one of Southeast Asia's top polo players.

During the 2017 SEA Games polo competition at the Putrajaya Equestrian Park, Brunei beat Singapore 10–8 to win the bronze medal on 28 August 2017. Pengiran Muda Bahar, the captain of the Brunei team and a player with a handicap of 2, was the team's star, contributing eight of the team's ten points while colleague Huzaimi Mahari scored two, winning him the title of "Most Valuable Player" for the competition. When approached by media following the game, he said that his team's performance had much improved and that they had performed better.

The polo team from Brunei recovered from the disappointment of losing the 4-6 high goal final to take home bronze at the 2019 SEA Games on 1 December in Calatagan, Batangas. Following their successes in the previous tournament in Kuala Lumpur, Malaysia, two years ago, he won a second consecutive polo bronze medal. In the opening chukka, Indonesia took a 2–0 lead until Pengiran Muda Bahar, the game-winning penalty taker for the Philippines, cut the score in half. He scored twice, including in the last 34 seconds of the third chukka, to help Brunei mount a comeback.

== Business career ==
Pengiran Muda Bahar was the owner of a business named Argent International.

Princess Azemah and Pengiran Muda Bahar launched Shine Brunei. To raise the bar in the country's local fitness sector and promote the health and welfare of the country, they wanted to make this form of boutique training available to Bruneians as well. In the nation, Shine Cycle is the only authentic cycling boutique; its doors first opened in February 2018.

== Lawsuit ==
His father, Jefri, appointed him and Hakeem as directors of the New York Palace before to the couple's departure for Brunei. The large, hefty princes are the real heirs to Jefri's lavish lifestyle, claim Jefri's lawyers Faith Zaman and Thomas Derbyshire. He claimed that he had simply "skimmed" the paperwork and would sign whatever Zaman put in front of him, despite the fact that he held the title of president of the New York Palace hotel and had approved many of the contracts and leases the defendants were alleged to have taken from his father.

According to Derbyshire, Pengiran Muda Bahar and his hairstylist had "an unbreakable friendship" as he matured. Eventually, they co-opened No. 5 Cavendish Square, a hotel, restaurant, and club in London. Upon being sued in a civil action, the partners sought the assistance of Derbyshire, a budding barrister they had encountered at No. 5. Derbyshire focused in money-laundering and fraud cases and was now defending Terry Adams, a well-known gangster in Britain.

According to Jefri's complaint, "in late March 2006, Pengiran Muda Bahar appointed her as Managing Director of the Palace Hotel, relying on Zaman's position as a fiduciary to him." She produced her job agreement, which he had signed, and stated that her yearly compensation comprised five percent of the hotel's total operating profit, a $100,000 automobile allowance, and free use of the business credit card for personal needs. Jefri later claimed in an affidavit that Bahar had not read the entire deal before signing it, saying, "Ms. Zaman did not inform [Pengiran Muda Bahar] that she was to receive 5% of GOP."

Upon presenting this complex case to the jury. The jury member stated, "There was no real proof that he didn't know what was going on and he didn't approve these dealings." "To me they looked like Hollywood actors, trying to show us that by being royals they were fooled," a fellow jury said of Jefri and Pengiran Muda Bahar.

== Titles, styles, and honours ==
Styles of Bahar ibni Jefri Bolkiah
- Reference style: Yang Amat Mulia
- Alternative style: His Highness

=== Title and style ===
Bahar's full style and title is Yang Amat Mulia Pengiran Muda Bahar ibni Duli Yang Teramat Mulia Paduka Seri Pengiran Digadong Sahibul Mal Pengiran Muda Haji Jefri Bolkiah. Brunei has a complex system of titles and the royal court does not usually translate Bahar's title. It can be translated into English as His Highness Pengiran Muda Bahar or His Highness Prince Bahar.

=== Honours ===
- Proclamation of Independence Medal (1 January 1984)
- Sultan of Brunei Silver Jubilee Medal (5 October 1992)
- Sultan of Brunei Golden Jubilee Medal (5 October 2017)
- National Day Silver Jubilee Medal (23 February 2009)

Pengiran Muda Bahar House of Bolkiah Born: 20 August 1981
Preceded by Abdul Halim Ar-Rahman	Succession to the Bruneian throne 21st position	Succeeded by Hasan Kiko
