= Taolu =

- Village
- Location in Burma
- Coordinates: 23°15′N 98°53′E
- Country: Burma
- Division: Wa Self-Administered Division (Shan State)
- District: Hopang District
- Elevation: 1,606 m (5,269 ft)
- Time zone: UTC+6.30 (MST)

Taolu is a village in Hopang District, Wa Self-Administered Division of Myanmar.

== Geography ==
Taolu is located in the mountainous area near the border with China, which lies 3 km (1.9 mi) east of the village. Mong Ling Shan mountain rises about 8 km (5.0 mi) to the north.

== See also ==
- Wa States
