= Asian University Championships =

Asian University Championships may refer to:

- Asian University Athletics Championships
- Many kinds of sport events organized by ASUF, held on an irregular basis, where each sport is organized independently.
  - Asian University 3x3 Basketball Championships, a competition organized by ASUF, where Mongolia men's national 3x3 team won in 2017 and 2019
  - Asian University Basketball Championships, AUB, an event organized by ASUF, which was first held in Taipei, Taiwan, in 2006, and last held in Taipei, Taiwan, in 2024.
  - Asian University Basketball League (AUBL), an event organized by ASUF, an initiative of Realeague, executed by Realeague, with the goal of establishing the NCAA of asia, which was first held in Hangzhou, China, in 2025. This event was invested by Brooklyn Nets owner Joe Tsai.
