= Basma Lachkar =

Bruneian wushu athlete

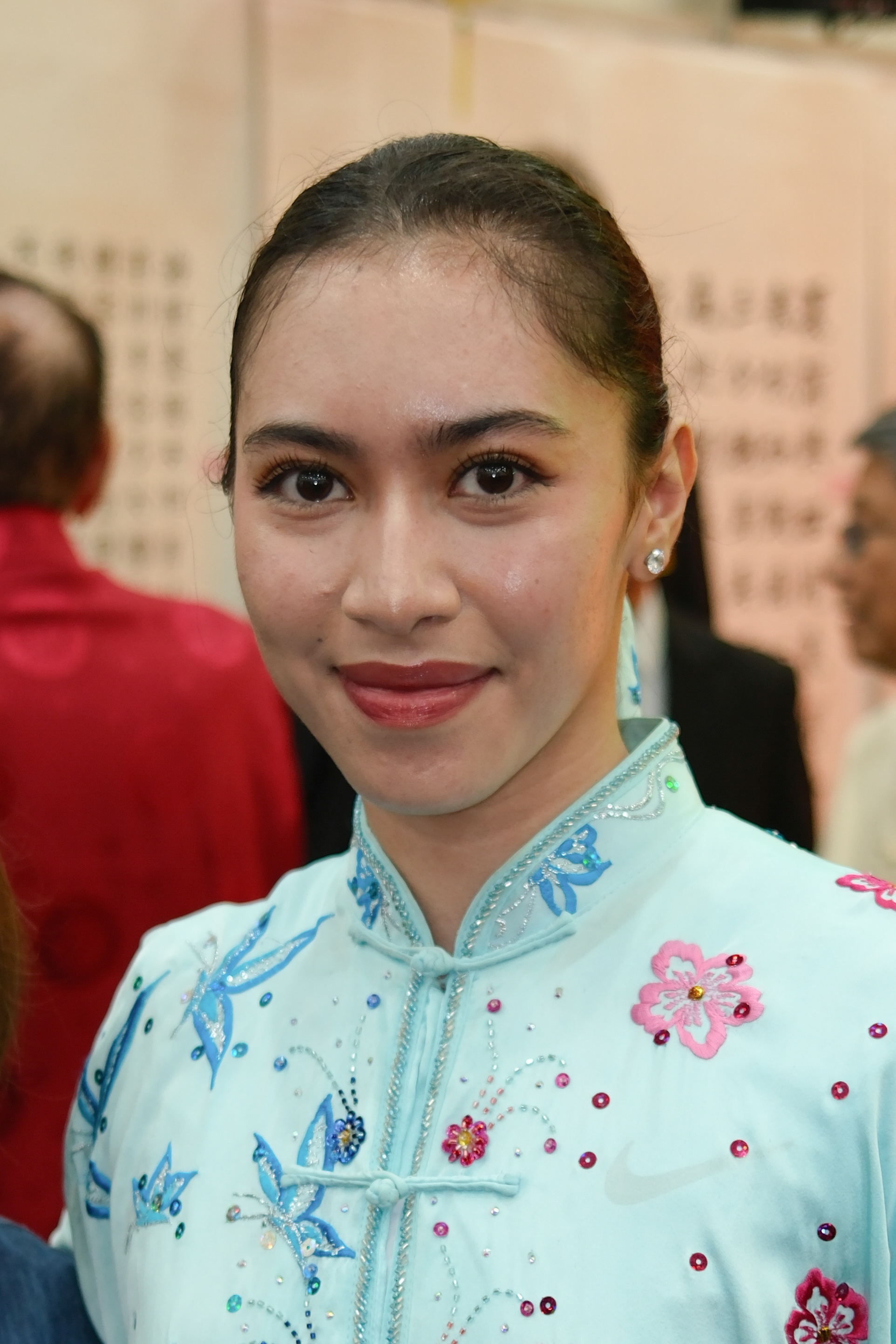
- Basma in 2026

Personal information
- Born: Basma binti Lachkar; 25 March 2003 (age 23)
- Education: Chung Hwa Middle School; Jerudong International School; Universiti Teknologi Brunei
- Occupations: Martial artist, athlete
- Height: 1.60 m (5 ft 3 in)

Sport
- Sport: Wushu
- Events: Taijiquan, Taijijian
- Team: Brunei Wushu Team
- Coached by: Li Hui
Medal record
Women's Wushu Taolu
Representing Brunei
World Games
Gold medal – first place	2022 Birmingham	Taijiquan+Taijijian
World Championships
Bronze medal – third place	2023 Fort Worth	Taijiquan
World Cup
Silver medal – second place	2026 Haikou	Taijijian
World Games Series
Gold medal – first place	2024 Hong Kong	Taijiquan+Taijijian
Asian Games
Silver medal – second place	2022 Hangzhou	Taijiquan+Taijijian
Bronze medal – third place	2026 Aichi–Nagoya	Taijiquan+Taijijian
Asian Cup
Silver medal – second place	2025 Songyuan	Taijiquan
Bronze medal – third place	2025 Songyuan	Taijijian
SEA Games
Silver medal – second place	2017 Kuala Lumpur	Taijiquan
Silver medal – second place	2019 Philippines	Taijiquan
Silver medal – second place	2025 Thailand	Taijiquan+Taijijian
Bronze medal – third place	2019 Philippines	Taijijian
Bronze medal – third place	2023 Cambodia	Taijiquan+Taijijian
World University Games
Silver medal – second place	2021 Chengdu	Taijijian
Asian University Championships
Gold medal – first place	2024 Harbin	Taijiquan
Gold medal – first place	2024 Harbin	Taijijian
ASEAN University Games
Gold medal – first place	2024 Surabaya-Malang	Taijiquan
Asian Junior Championships
Gold medal – first place	2019 Bandar Seri Begawan	Taijiquan (A)
Silver medal – second place	2019 Bandar Seri Begawan	Daoshu (A)

Basma binti Lachkar (born 25 March 2003) is a Bruneian wushu taolu athlete of Moroccan descent specialising in taijiquan.

== Early life and education ==
Basma was born to a Moroccan father and Bruneian mother. She attended Chung Hwa Middle School, Bandar Seri Begawan taking up wushu initially as a school co-curricular activity to join her brother, Walid Lachkar. In October 2022, Hajah Rosnah binti Awang Tengah, her mother, died. Notably, she graduated Jerudong International School (JIS) in class 2022, and Sports School from 2016 to 2019. She is enrolled in Universiti Teknologi Brunei as of 1 July 2024, where she is studying for a BSc (Hons) in Communication.

== Career ==
Basma would eventually become part of Brunei's wushu national team which has been under Chinese coach Li Hui since 2006. In the Kuala Lumpur Convention Centre on 22 August 2017, she became victorious in the Women's Compulsory Taijiquan finals of the 29th Southeast Asian (SEA) Games with a score of 9.54 points. She is 1.6 meters tall in 2023. She hasn't become much taller since 2018, the year she participated in her maiden Asian Games as a 15-year-old. She did not clinch a podium finish in her usual tai chi event due to inexperience.

Basma was part of the first group from Brunei to travel to the 19th Sukma Games 2018, which took place from 12 to 22 September in Perak. On 30 November 2019, in the Philippines, she had the honor of carrying the Brunei flag at the 30th SEA Games opening ceremony. In the women's taijiquan event, Basma, the youngest competitor in her division, won silver for the second time in a row at the SEA Games with a score of 9.55.

Competing in the tai chi event, Basma would set several milestones for her country's national wushu program. At the 2022 World Games in Birmingham in the United States, she would win the first ever gold medal for Brunei in the tournament. With a total score of 19.040 points, she placed first on the podium in the women's combined taijiquan and taijijian event.

In the following 2022 edition in Huangzhou, Basma would see success when she bagged Brunei's first ever Asian Games silver medalist in any sports. She is the Asian Games' flag bearer for Brunei as well. She achieved 9.756 points for a total of 19.502, which was sufficient for a silver medal. Additionally, it was her nation's first medal at the Asian Games since Tong Kit Siong in 2002.

In the women's taijijian competition at the World University Games, Basma came in second. Silver was hers when she scored a total of 9.680 points at the Chengbei Gymnasium in Chengdu. From this, she also became the first recipient of Brunei's special sports scholarship program.

She beat Japan's Hibiki Isono, who scored 9.5003, to take first place with a score of 9.510 after her performance. Following her victory in the women's taijijian event on 20 June 2024, she finished first on the podium at the Asian University Wushu Championship. She defeated six other competitors to win the gold medal in Harbin, China. In the women's optional tianjiquan category, she won her second gold medal with a score of 9.490, defeating Chen Yuxing of China by a score of 0.004.

On 27 June 2024, she extended her winning streak by capturing the gold medal in the women's tai chi competition at the 2024 ASEAN University Games, which were hosted in Malang, Indonesia. Basma's exceptional technical skill allowed her to get a top score of 9.486 in women's tai chi.

== Honours and recognitions ==
A road at Kampong Pulaie Sports School would officially be renamed Basma Drive in November 2023.

For the 2023 World Games Athlete of the Year, Basma has received a nomination. This comes after she won the women's taijiquan and taijijian combined event in the World Games 2022.

Sultan Hassanal Bolkiah presented Basma with the Excellent Youth Award on the 19th National Youth Day.
