= 2024 ASEAN University Games =

Sports event in Surabaya, Malang, Indonesia

XXI ASEAN University Games
- Host city: Surabaya and Malang, Indonesia
- Nations: 11
- Events: 250 in 21 sports
- Opening: 25 June
- Closing: 6 July
- Opened by: Dito Ariotedjo; Minister of Youth and Sports
- Ceremony venue: State University of Surabaya
- Website: 2024 ASEAN University Games

2024 ASEAN University Games officially the 21st ASEAN University Games and also known as Surabaya-Malang 2022 was a regional multi-sport event held from 25 June to 6 July 2024 in Surabaya and Malang, Indonesia.

== Development and preparations ==
=== Mascot ===
The MAS SUMA mascot was chosen as the AUG 2024 mascot. MAS SUMA is an acronym for (MASCOT ASEAN UNIVERSITY GAMES SURABAYA MALANG). The mascot is symbolized by a combination of images of a crocodile, shark and lion.

=== Venues ===
The 21st ASEAN University Games has 10 venues for the games.

Competition Venue	Sports
Universitas Negeri Surabaya	Opening and closing ceremony
Universitas Surabaya	Wushu, Bridge
UPN Veteran Jawa Timur	Chess
Universitas Airlangga	Basketball 3x3, Judo
Institut Teknologi Sepuluh Nopember	Handball
Universitas Negeri Surabaya	Athletics, Futsal, Pétanque, Tennis, Basketball 5x5, Volleyball
Universitas Negeri Malang	Beach volleyball, Badminton, Archery
Universitas Brawijaya	Taekwondo, Sepak takraw
Universitas Islam Malang	Karate
Universitas Muhammadiyah Malang	Pencak Silat
Komite Olahraga Nasional Indonesia Jawa Timur	Swimming, Sport climbing

== The Games ==
=== Sports ===
There were 21 sports for these games.

2024 ASEAN University Games Sporting Programmes

- Archery (10)
- Athletics (41)
- Badminton (7)
- Basketball
  - Basketball 3x3 (2)
  - Basketball (2)
- Bridge (3)
- Chess (4)
- Handball (2)
- Football
  - Futsal (1)
- Judo (15)
- Karate (17)
- Pencak silat (20)
- Pétanque (9)
- Sepak takraw (3)
- Sport climbing (8)
- Swimming (38)
- Taekwondo (18)
- Tennis (3)
- Volleyball (2)
  - Beach volleyball (1)
  - Indoor volleyball (1)
- Wushu (16)

=== Participating nations ===
All 11 members of Southeast Asian Games Federation took part in the 2024 Asean University Games. Below is a list of all the participating NOCs.

- Brunei (BRU)
- Cambodia (CAM)
- Indonesia (INA) (Host)
- Laos (LAO)
- Malaysia (MAS)
- Myanmar (MYA)
- Philippines (PHI)
- Singapore (SGP)
- Thailand (THA)
- Timor-Leste (TLS)
- Vietnam (VIE)

=== Calendar ===
OC	Opening ceremony	●	Event competition	●	Gold medal events	CC	Closing ceremony

June/July 2024		23rd Sun	24th Mon	25th Tue	26th Wed	27th Thu	28st Fri	29st Sat	30nd Sun	1st Mon	2nd Tue	3rd Wed	4th Thu	5th Fri	6th Sat	7th Sun	8th Mon	Events
Ceremonies				OC													CC	—N/a
Archery									●	●	●	●						10
Athletics										●								41
Badminton		●	●	●	●	●	●		●	●								7
Basketball	Basketball 3x3			●	●	●												2
Basketball	Basketball 5x5							●	●	●	●	●	●	●				2
Bridge					●	●		●	●									16
Chess					●	●	●	●	●									4
Futsal		●	●	●	●	●	●			●	●	●						2
Handball				●	●	●	●			●								16
Judo				●														16
Karate									●	●	●	●				●	●	17
Pencak silat										●	●	●	●	●				20
Petanque				●						●								9
Sepak takraw										●	●	●	●	●				3
Sport climbing		●	●	●					●	●								8
Swimming			●	●				●										38
Taekwondo							●	●	●	●						●		18
Tennis		●	●	●	●	●	●	●	●									3
Volleyball	Beach volleyball								●	●	●	●		●				2
Volleyball	Volleyball	●	●	●	●	●	●	●	●		●	●						2
Wushu						6	6	9	4									16
Daily medal events																		
Cumulative total																		
June/July 2024		23rd Sun	24th Mon	25th Tue	26th Wed	27th Thu	28th Fri	29th Sat	30th Sun	1st Mon	2nd Tue	3rd Wed	4th Thu	5th Fri	6th Sat	7th Sun	8th Mon	Events

== Medal table ==
As of July 6, 2024

* Host nation (Indonesia)

2024 ASEAN University Games medal table
Rank	Nation	Gold	Silver	Bronze	Total
1	Indonesia*	126	99	71	296
2	Thailand	53	49	29	131
3	Malaysia	38	47	62	147
4	Vietnam	12	9	5	26
5	Singapore	11	27	36	74
6	Philippines	3	3	9	15
7	Laos	3	2	6	11
8	Myanmar	2	8	1	11
9	Cambodia	1	5	3	9
10	Brunei	1	0	0	1
11	Timor-Leste	0	1	9	10
Totals (11 entries)		250	250	231	731

Preceded by Naypyidaw; 2022	ASEAN University Games; Surabaya; Malang; XXI ASEAN University Games (2024)	Succeeded by
