= Hosea Wong =

Bruneian wushu athlete

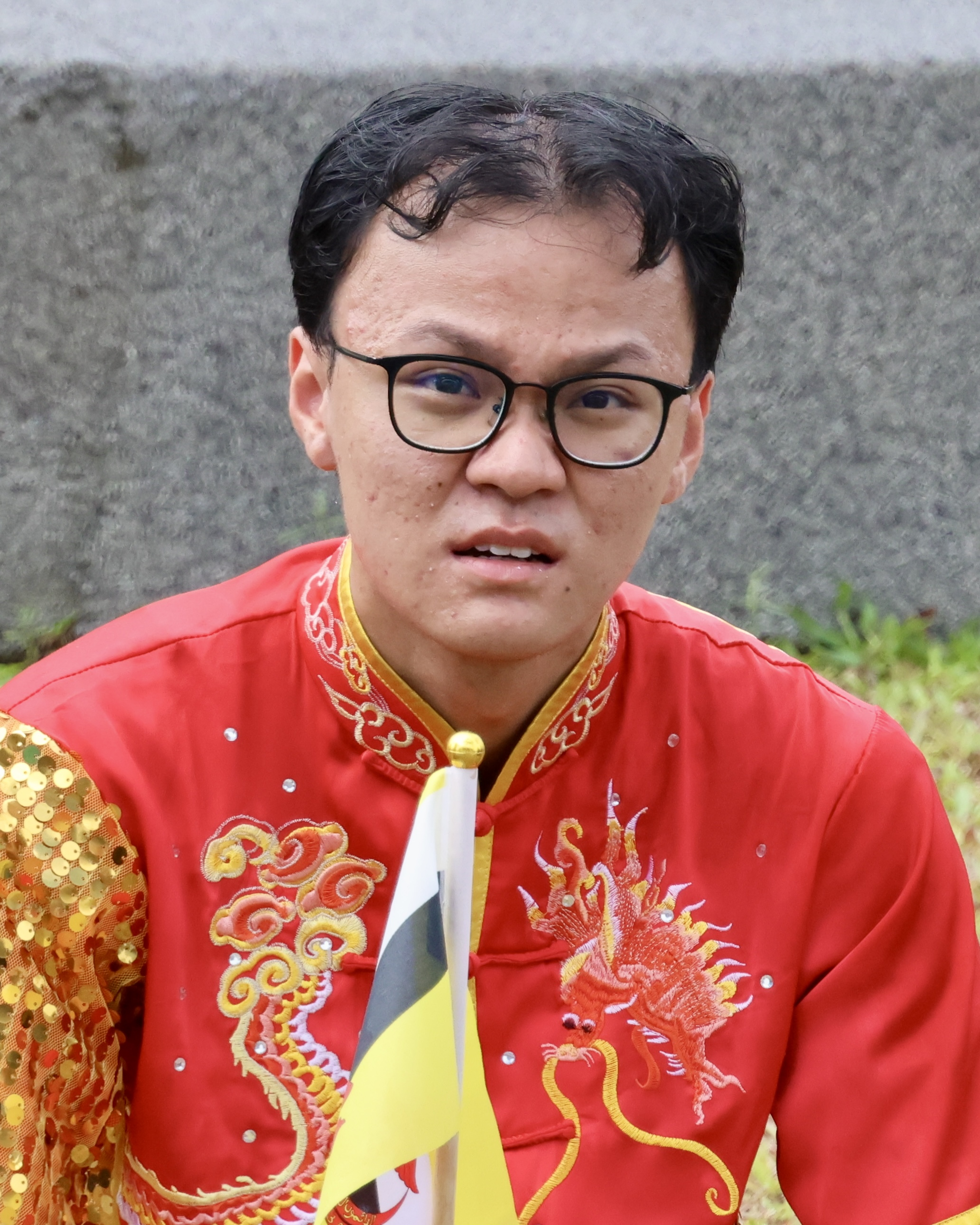
- Hosea in 2024

Personal information
- Born: Wong Zheng Yu; 16 May 2003 (age 23) Brunei
- Education: Chung Hwa Middle School; Laksamana College of Business
- Occupations: Martial artist, athlete
- Height: 1.68 m (5 ft 6 in)

Sport
- Sport: Wushu
- Events: Taijijian and Taijiquan
- Team: Brunei Wushu Team
- Coached by: Li Hui
Medal record
Men's Wushu Taolu
Representing Brunei
World Games
Silver medal – second place	2022 Birmingham	Taijiquan+Taijijian
SEA Games
Gold medal – first place	2023 Phnom Penh	Taijiquan+Taijijian
Silver medal – second place	2019 Philippines	Taijiquan
Bronze medal – third place	2019 Philippines	taijijian
Asian Junior Championships
Gold medal – first place	2019 Bandar Seri Begawan	Taijiquan

Hosea Wong
- Simplified Chinese: 黄正宇
- Traditional Chinese: 黃正宇
Transcriptions
Standard Mandarin
- Hanyu Pinyin: Huángzhèngyǔ

Hosea Wong Zheng Yu (Chinese: 黄正宇; pinyin: Huángzhèngyǔ; born 16 May 2003) is a Bruneian wushu athlete of Chinese descent specialising in taijiquan.

== Early life and education ==
Born in Brunei on 16 May 2003, Hosea completed his primary and secondary education in Chung Hwa Middle School, Bandar Seri Begawan before he undertook Laksamana College of Business (LCB)'s University Foundation Course.

== Career ==
He competed for his nation at the 2017 Asian Junior Wushu Championship, which took place in Gumi, from 14 to 21 September 2017. Again in the 2019 Asian Junior Wushu Championship, where he finished gold in his group. In the 2017 Sarawak International Wuwang Cup Wushu Invitation Championship at Stadium Perpaduan Negeri Sarawak, Hosea placed second and third with 17.97 points.

Hosea was part of the first group from Brunei to travel to the 19th Sukma Games 2018, which took place from 12 to 22 September in Perak. Under Li Hui's tutelage, he would compete in taijijian and taijiquan competitions. In the men's taijiquan competition, he came in eighth. "Hosea actually did well as this is the first time that he competed in Sukma," Li Hui remarked of his achievement. Hosea almost missed the podium in 2019 SEA Games, having earned bronze in the taijijian event and silver in the taijiquan event with 9,590 points.

In the men's taijiquan event, he received 9.48 points in the 31st SEA Games, placing him considerably outside the podium. He competed in the men's taijijian event, however his effort to win a medal would be in vain. After taking silver in the men's combined taijijian and taijiquan event at the Bill Battle Coliseum in Birmingham on 14 July 2022, he contributed to the nation's historic achievement at the World Games 2022.

Hosea won the men's taijiquan + taijijian event at the Chroy Changvar Convention Center, earning Brunei's second gold medal at the 2023 SEA Games. This time, he made sure to place first on the podium, defeating ten other competitors with a total score of 19.189, defeating Tan Zhi Yan of Malaysia and Goolsawadmongkol Katisak of Thailand. A few months later at the 2022 Asian Games (hosted in 2023), he did not place in the men's taijiquan event.
