= Akarin =

Akarin may refer to:

== People ==
=== Nickname ===
- Akari Hayami (早見 あかり, born 1995), Japanese actress, model and former idol singer
- Akari Kitō (鬼頭 明里, born 1994), Japanese voice actress and singer
- Akari Nanawo (ナナヲ アカリ, born 1995), Japanese musician and YouTuber
- Akari Suda (須田 亜香里, born 1991), Japanese tarento
- Akari Yamada (山田 朱莉, born 1996), Japanese fashion model, actress, and model
- Akari Yoshida (吉田 朱里, born 1996), Japanese YouTuber, tarento and fashion model

=== Given name ===
- Akarin Akaranitimaytharatt (born 1981), Thai actor in the 2021 film 4 Kings
- Akarin Areerak, Thai actor in the 2012 television drama Torranee Ni Nee Krai Krong
- Akarin Intarakanchit, Thai waterskier; see Waterskiing at the 2019 SEA Games
- Akarin Siwapornpitak (born 1984), Thai actor in the 2005 film Art of the Devil 2
- Akarin Thitisakulvit, Thai rugby player; see Rugby sevens at the 2019 SEA Games

== Fictional characters ==
- Akari Himuro (緋室 灯), in the Japanese role-playing game Night Wizard!

== See also ==
- Akari (disambiguation)
