= Rugby sevens at the 2019 SEA Games =

Competitions at the 2019 Southeast Asian Games

- Venue: Clark Parade Grounds
- Location: Angeles City
- Dates: 7–8 December
- Nations: 7
- Teams: 13 (7 men's, 6 women's)

The rugby sevens competitions at the 2019 Southeast Asian Games in the Philippines took place at the Clark Parade Grounds in Angeles City.

== Competition schedule ==
| G | Group stage | PO | 5th place play-off | B | 3rd place play-off | F | Final |

| Event | Sat 7 | Sun 8 | | | |
|---|---|---|---|---|---|
| Men | G | G | PO | B | F |
| Women | G | G | PO | B | F |

Source: 2019 SEA Games Official Calendar

== Participating nations ==
=== Men's tournament ===
- Indonesia
- Laos
- Malaysia
- Philippines
- Singapore
- Thailand

=== Women's tournament ===
- Indonesia
- Laos
- Malaysia
- Philippines
- Singapore
- Thailand

== Men's competition ==
=== Group stage ===
| Pos | Team | Pld | W | D | L | PF | PA | PD | Pts | Final Result |
|---|---|---|---|---|---|---|---|---|---|---|
| 1 | Philippines (H) | 5 | 5 | 0 | 0 | 162 | 26 | +136 | 15 | Advanced to Gold medal match |
| 2 | Malaysia | 5 | 4 | 0 | 1 | 151 | 43 | +108 | 13 | Advanced to Gold medal match |
| 3 | Singapore | 5 | 3 | 0 | 2 | 164 | 47 | +117 | 11 | Advanced to Bronze medal match |
| 4 | Thailand | 5 | 2 | 0 | 3 | 113 | 81 | +32 | 9 | Advanced to Bronze medal match |
| 5 | Indonesia | 5 | 1 | 0 | 4 | 47 | 188 | −141 | 7 | Advanced to 5th place playoff match |
| 6 | Laos | 5 | 0 | 0 | 5 | 10 | 262 | −252 | 5 | Advanced to 5th place playoff match |

Source: 2019 SEA Games Official Calendar
(H) Hosts

=== Final round ===
5th place playoff

8 December 2019
15:20

| Indonesia | 21–7 | Laos |
| | Report |

Clark Parade Grounds, Angeles City

Bronze medal match

8 December 2019
16:00

| Singapore | 5–12 | Thailand |
| | Report |

Clark Parade Grounds, Angeles City

Gold medal match

8 December 2019
16:40

| Philippines | 19–0 | Malaysia |
| | Report |

Clark Parade Grounds, Angeles City

== Women's competition ==
=== Group stage ===
| Pos | Team | Pld | W | D | L | PF | PA | PD | Pts | Final Result |
|---|---|---|---|---|---|---|---|---|---|---|
| 1 | Thailand | 5 | 5 | 0 | 0 | 186 | 12 | +174 | 15 | Advanced to Gold medal match |
| 2 | Philippines (H) | 5 | 4 | 0 | 1 | 103 | 55 | +48 | 13 | Advanced to Gold medal match |
| 3 | Malaysia | 5 | 3 | 0 | 2 | 102 | 79 | +23 | 11 | Advanced to Bronze medal match |
| 4 | Indonesia | 5 | 2 | 0 | 3 | 56 | 113 | −57 | 9 | Advanced to Bronze medal match |
| 5 | Singapore | 5 | 1 | 0 | 4 | 63 | 82 | −19 | 7 | Advanced to 5th place playoff match |
| 6 | Laos | 5 | 0 | 0 | 5 | 0 | 169 | −169 | 5 | Advanced to 5th place playoff match |

Source: 2019 SEA Games Official Calendar
(H) Hosts

=== Final round ===
5th place playoff

8 December 2019
15:00

| Singapore | 43–0 | Laos |
| | Report |

Clark Parade Grounds, Angeles City

Bronze medal match

8 December 2019
15:40

| Malaysia | 19–12 | Indonesia |
| | Report |

Clark Parade Grounds, Angeles City

Gold medal match

8 December 2019
16:20

| Thailand | 17–7 | Philippines |
| | Report |

Clark Parade Grounds, Angeles City

== Medal summary ==
=== Medal table ===
* Host nation (Philippines)

| Rank | Nation | Gold | Silver | Bronze | Total |
|---|---|---|---|---|---|
| 1 | Philippines (PHI)* | 1 | 1 | 0 | 2 |
| 2 | Thailand (THA) | 1 | 0 | 1 | 2 |
| 3 | Malaysia (MAS) | 0 | 1 | 1 | 2 |
| Totals (3 entries) | | 2 | 2 | 2 | 6 |

=== Medalists ===
| Event | Gold | Silver | Bronze |
|---|---|---|---|
| Men's tournament | Philippines (PHI); Timothy Peter Berry; Donald Keith Coleman; Justin Coveney; Clifford Joe Dawson; Harry Dionson; Robert John Fogerty; Tommy Gregory Gilbert; Ryan Ralph Howe; Daniel Matthews; Patrice David Louis Olivier; Luc Stefan Smith; Ned Ralph Stephenson; Vincent Francis Young | Malaysia (MAS); Azmi Zulkiflee; Muhammad Ameer Nasrun Zulkeffli; Anwarul Hafiz Ahmad; Muhammad Azwan Zuwairi Mat Zizi; Muhamad Firdaus Tarmizi; Wan Izzudin Ismail; Muhammad Dzafran Asyraf Zainudin; Mohamad Nasharuddin Ismail; Muhammad Siddiq Amir Jalil; Mohamad Sofian Kamil; Muhammad Azizul Hakim Che Oon; Muhammad Zulhisham Rasli; Amalul Hazim Nasaruddin | Thailand (THA); Wuttikorn Kaewkhiao; Warongkorn Khamkoet; Noppasit Kradkrayang; Latthaphon Lormongkol; Artit Preraworasakul; Panupong Puangpun; Wuttipong Sakunthingthong; Sumet Thammaporn; Akarin Thitisakulvit; Pooreepong Wachirabunjong; Kerdkao Wechokittikorn; Sirawat Wisitkittikon |
| Women's tournament | Thailand (THA); Butsaya Bunrak; Piyamat Chomphumee; Thanaporn Huankid; Chayatip Kuabpimai; Uthumporn Liamrat; Wannaree Meechok; Laksina Nawakaew; Supansa Phaiphimai; Tidarat Sawatnam; Thanachporn Wandee; Rattanaporn Wittayaronnayut; Chitchanok Yusri | Philippines (PHI); Agot Danton; Aldee Faith Lyde Denuyo; Patrocinia Duffy; Helena Roxanne Indigne; Nicole Kovanen; Erica Mae Legaspi; Ada Milby; Aiumi Ono; Anna Beatrix Pacis; Jacquiline Mae Rodriguez; Rassiel Sales; Sylvia Tudoc | Malaysia (MAS); Inamulla Siti Fatimah Abdulla; Norfarahana Aziz; Nur Izzah Azizan; Nurul Azreen Azli; Shania Suinani Baduk; Amber Bernard; Emily Stephanie Chua; Anne Euphrasia Cralis; Christiana Edris; Pasan Cindy John; Rozliana Ridwan; Fidelia Limang Telajan |
