= Kyouka =

Japanese actor

- 京佳
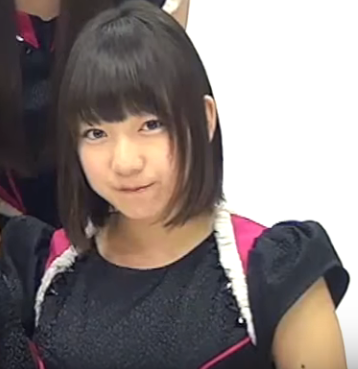
- Kyouka in 2015
- Born: December 2, 1999 (age 26); Saitama Prefecture, Japan
- Other names: Kyoutan (きょうたん, Kyōtan); Kyou-chan (きょうちゃん, Kyō-chan)
- Occupations: Gravure idol; actress; businessperson
- Known for: Oshiete! 3 shimai as hina sanjo (2010–2012)
- Height: 155 cm (5 ft 1 in)
- Musical career
- Years active: 2012–2019
- Formerly of: Yumemiru Adolescence

Kyouka (京佳, Kyōka; born 2 December 1999, in Saitama Prefecture) is a Japanese businessperson, actress, and tarento. She is a former member of Yumemiru Adolescence and is the representative director of KYOinc. She moved to the United Kingdom in April 2022.

== Biography ==
When she was in her third grade of elementary school, Kyouka belonged to Tambourine Artists and started performing arts activities. (Note: She became the first in Tambourine Artists, joining in non-auditioned.) In June 2012, she became a member of the idol music theatre group Yumemiru Adolescence composed of female tarentos who belong to Tambourine Artists. In September 2013, Kyouka won Kodansha Miss iD 2014 personal prize (Imaizumi power award). In December 2013, she made her first stage appearance at Digital Homunculus, chair, and served as the leading actress. From January 2017, Kyouka started DJ activities as DJ Kyouka. On May 19, 2017, it scheduled to release her first solo photo book Thankyouka!!!. On April 12, 2019, Kyouka announced her graduation from the group on April 21, 2019.

On January 22, 2020, Kyouka established her own talent agency, KYOinc. On February 5, she launched the fashion brand Jela.

On August 9, 2020, Kyouka released her solo debut single New Game, for which she also wrote the lyrics.

On November 21, 2020, Kyouka launched a crowdfunding campaign (with a goal of 2 million yen) to create a mini-album, which ended on January 29, 2021 with 28% of its goal (578,000 yen).

In January 2022, Kyouka announced the production of a full nude photo book to mark the end of her gravure activities. The first photos were previewed in the January 4 issue of Friday magazine and the web site Friday Subscription. On March 4, her final photo book, titled Frontera, was released by Kodansha.

In April 2022, Kyouka moved to the United Kingdom and started her study at a language school.

== Works ==
=== Videos ===
Date	Title	Publisher	Ref.
19 Feb 2016	16 -Six Teen-	E-Net Frontier	
20 Nov 2019	Miseinen	Line Communications, Inc.	

=== Photo albums ===
Date	Title	Publisher	Ref.
19 May 2017	Thankyouka!!!	Kodansha	
30 November 2018	Kyon-nyuu	Kodansha	

== Filmography ==
=== Anime ===
Run	Title	Network	Notes	Ref.
11 Oct 2010 – 26 Mar 2012	Shimajirō Hesoka	TSC	"Oshiete! 3 Shimai" (27 episodes); as Hina Sanjo, and on the "Kurukuruin!" music video	

=== Television ===
Run	Title	Network	Notes	Ref.
22 (midnight on 21) Apr 2014	Zenryoku-zaka	EX		
28 Jun 2014	Pink!SS	SATV		
4 Dec – 20 Dec 2014	Tamagawa Kuyakusho of the Dead	TX	(Note: Appeared in photographs and dialogues, she is in the form of a guiding man of Tanokura of characters.)	
24 Nov 2015	Watashi o mitsukete	NHK		
20 May 2017	Shinya ni Hakken! Shin shock-kan: Ichido o tameshi kudasai	TX		

=== Advertisements ===
Title	Product	Brand
Apr 2009 –	Heelys (Roller Shoes)	Healing Sports

=== Films ===
Date	Title	Role
Aug 2013	The Joker Game: Escape	Tomomi Egawa (江川知巳, Egawa Tomomi)
Feb 2017	SUPER Horrifying Story 2	Natsumi (奈津美, Natsumi)

=== Stage ===
Run	Title	Role	Notes
18–23 Dec 2013	Alice in Project Digital Homunculus	Misaki	Lead role
28 Feb – 9 Mar 2014	Kikaku Engeki Shūdan Bokura Dan Yoshi – Play Again – vol. 4 Ghost Writers!!	Mai Oizumi (child)	

=== Events ===
Date	Title	Time	Location
12 Jan 2009	Tambourine Mania 04		Nishi Shinjuku Crossroad
15 Mar 2009	Tambourine Mania sizeS		Akihabara Goodman
21 Aug 2009	Tambourine Summer Fes 2009	Part 1 14:00–; Part 2 19:00–	Kitazawa Town Hall
3 Nov 2009	Aki wa Bunkamatsuri TM05 –Kotoshi no Theme wa "Natsu no Wasuremono"–		Eyepitte Mejiro
14 Feb 2010	Tambourine Mania 06 Valentine wa Shibuya dene'.		Shibuya Jpop-Cafe
20 Jun 2010	Tambourine Mania 007 –Azabujūban yori Ai o komete–		Atelier Fontaine
5 Sep 2010	Tambourine Mania 08 Shimokitazawa de Mite ne, Kii te ne, Utatte ne!		Shimokitazawa ReG
28 Nov 2010	Tambourine Mania 009 Ato wa Yūki dakeda!	Hiru no Bu Kuroi Yūrei-hen Part 1 13:00–; Yoru no Bu Tenshi-hen 17:00–	Nakameguro Kinkero Theater
13 Feb 2011	Tambourine Mania 10 Charlie to Chocolate Gekijō		Shimmoku Space Liberty
21 Aug 2011	Tambourine Mania 11 Akakichi no Eleven –Field ni Seishun o Kaketa Shōjo-tachi no Monogatari–		Geki Chika Liberty
12 Mar 2012	Tambourine Mania 12 12-Ri no Ikareru Shōjo		Geki Chika Liberty
14 Dec 2013	Tambourine Mania 13 sizeS Mini Santa no omotenashi		Shibuya Loop Annex
1 Apr 2015	21-Ji no Kyoutan		Shimokitazawa Box104

=== Others ===
Run	Title	Website	Notes
8 Jul 2013 –	Yumemiru Adolescence Kyouka no Ato 30-bu de Cinderella TV	TwitCasting	Irregular broadcasts

== Model appearances ==
=== Magazines ===
Date	Title	No.	Publisher	Notes	Ref.
	Pichi Lemon		Gakken Publishing	(Note: She frequently appeared in the form of introductions and advertisements, not as modelling.)	
6 Feb 2014	Weekly Young Jump	10	Shueisha		
1 Aug 2014	Idol Spot	Vol. 13	Idol Spot	Flyer	
2 Oct 2014	Weekly Young Jump	44	Shueisha		
27 Nov 2014	Weekly Young Jump	52	Shueisha	Co-starred with Akari Yamada	
12 Jun 2015	Young Animal	12, Issue 26 Jun 2015	Hakusensha		
22 Jul 2015	Bomb "Bomb Love Special 2015"	Issue Sep	Gakken Publishing	Separate volume	
27 Jul 2015	Weekly Playboy	32	Shueisha		
30 Jul 2015	Weekly Young Jump	35	Shueisha		
26 Aug 2015	Weekly Shōnen Magazine	39	Kodansha		
4 Sep 2015	Young Gangan	18	Square Enix	End gravure	
14 Oct 2015	Weekly Shōnen Magazine	46	Kodansha		
16 Oct 2015	Young Gangan	21	Square Enix	Appendix DVD	
16 Oct 2015	Fruits Bessatsu idp magazine		Lens Corporation/Street Editing Room		
20 Oct 2015	Photo Technique Digital	Issue Nov 2015	Genkosha		
4 Dec 2015	Young Gangan	24	Square Enix		
18 Dec 2015	Young Gangan	01	Square Enix	End gravure	
15 Feb 2016	Ex Taishū	Issue Mar 2016	Futabasha		
3 Jun 2016	Young Gangan	12	Square Enix	Front page, end gravure	
24 Aug 2016	Weekly Shōnen Magazine	39	Kodansha		
30 Aug 2016	Gekkan Entame	Issue Oct	Tokuma Shoten		
16 Sep 2016	Young Gangan	19	Square Enix	Appendix DVD	
22 Oct 2016	GooBike	Issue 11/21	Proto Corporation		
27 Dec 2016	Shūkan Spa!	Merger no. 3–10 Jan 2017	Fusosha		
29 Dec 2016	Gekkan Entame	Issue Feb	Takuma Shoten		
29 Mar 2017	Idol And Read	010	Shinko Music Entertainment		
7 Apr 2017	Young Gangan	8	Square Enix		
8 Apr 2017	HR	Issue May–Jun	Graffiti Inc.		
19 Apr 2017	Weekly Shōnen Magazine	20	Kodansha		
28 Apr 2017	Gekkan Entame Zōkan	Issue Jun	Takuma Shoten		
2 May 2017	Friday Dynamite	5/16 Extra issue	Kodansha		

=== Book ===
Date	Title	Publisher	Ref.
26 Mar 2014	Yōsensha Mook: Idol Saizensen 2014	Yosensha	ISBN 978-4-8003-0338-7

=== Others ===
Year	Title	Issue	Publisher
18 Feb 2017	Yūkan Fuji	29 Feb 2016 (14,122)	Sankei Shimbun Co., Ltd.
