= Akari =

Akari may refer to:

- Akari (album), by New York Unit, 1994
- Akari (given name), a feminine Japanese given name
- Akari (kickboxer), a RISE kickboxer
- Akari (lamp), a line of paper lanterns designed by Isamu Noguchi
- Akari (manga), a Japanese manga series
- Akari (puzzle), a logic puzzle, also known as Light Up
- Akari (satellite), an infrared astronomy satellite
- Akari Chargers, a Philippine women's volleyball club
- Akari Lighting & Technology, a Philippine lighting brand
- AKARI Project, a Japanese telecommunications design project

== See also ==
- Akare, a village in the Doufelgou Prefecture in the Kara Region of north-eastern Togo.
