= Akari (given name) =

- Gender: Female

Origin
- Origin: Japanese
- Meaning: Different meanings depending on the kanji used

Akari (written: 灯, 明里, 明梨, 明理, 朱里, 朱莉, 亜香里, あかり in hiragana or アカリ in katakana) is a feminine Japanese given name. Notable people with the name include:

- Akari (wrestler) (born 1994), Chilean professional wrestler
- Akari Akase (あかせ あかり; born 2001), Japanese singer, cosplayer, gravure idol, internet personality, and actress
- Akari Asahina (朝日奈 あかり; born 1988), Japanese AV idol, actress and gravure model
- Akari Endo (born 1989), Dominican-Japanese actress
- Akari Fujinami (藤波 朱理; born 2003), Japanese freestyle wrestler
- Akari Harashima (原嶋 あかり; born 1990), Japanese voice actress and singer
- Akari Hayami (早見 あかり; born 1995), Japanese idol, singer, actress and model
- Akari Hibino (日比野 朱里; born 1959), Japanese voice actress
- Akari Inaba (稲場 朱里; born 1998), Japanese water polo player
- Akari Ishizuka (石塚 朱莉; born 1997), Japanese actress and singer
- Akari Kageyama (影山 灯; born 1993), Japanese voice actress
- Akari Kaibe (海邉 朱莉; born 2007), Japanese idol of the idol group Nogizaka46
- Akari Kaida (海田 明里; born 1974), Japanese video game composer
- Akari Kishikawa (岸川 朱里; born 1985), Japanese retired middle-distance runner
- Akari Kitō (鬼頭 明里; born 1994), Japanese voice actress
- Akari Kurishima (栗島 朱里; born 1994), Japanese women's footballer
- Akari Matsukubo (松久保 明梨; born 1996), Japanese professional footballer
- Akari Midorikawa (緑川 あかり; born 2005), Japanese professional squash player
- Akari Nakagomi (中込 紅莉; born 2000), Japanese field hockey player
- Akari Nakamura (中村 朱里; born 1998), Japanese idol of the idol group Niji no Conquistador
- Akari Nanawo (ナナヲ アカリ; born 1995), Japanese musician and YouTuber
- Akari Nibu (丹生 明里; born 2001), Japanese singer, voice actress
- Akari Ogata (緒方 亜香里; born 1990), Japanese judoka
- Akari Omori (大森朱莉; born 2002), Japanese judoka
- Akari Oumi (近江 あかり; born 1989), Japanese volleyball player
- Akari Owata (小和田 あかり), Japanese former idol of the idol group Dempagumi.inc
- Akari Saho (佐保 明梨; born 1995), Japanese idol and singer
- Akari Sato (佐藤 灯; born 2001), Japanese former badminton player
- Akari Shiraki (白木 星; born 1996), Japanese professional footballer
- Akari Suda (須田 亜香里; born 1991), Japanese idol and singer
- Akari Takaishi (髙石 あかり; born 2002), Japanese actress
- Akari Takeshige (竹重 杏歌理; born 2003), Japanese professional footballer
- Akari Takeuchi (竹内 朱莉; born 1997), Japanese idol and singer
- Akari Uchida (内田 明理; born 1969), Japanese video game producer
- Akari Uemura (植村 あかり; born 1998), Japanese idol and singer
- Akari Watanabe (渡邊 星; born 2003), Japanese professional kickboxer
- Akari Yamada (山田 朱莉; born 1996), Japanese model and actress
- Akari Yoshida (吉田 朱里; born 1996), Japanese idol and singer
- Akari Yura (由良 朱合; born 1999), Japanese singer, voice actress, and model

== Fictional characters ==
- Akari Akaza (赤座 あかり), a character in the manga series YuruYuri
- Akari Fujisaki (藤崎 あかり), a character in the anime series Hikaru No Go
- Akari Hanao (花尾 朱莉), a character in the visual novel Moe! Ninja Girls
- Akari Hinomoto (陽ノ本 アカリ), a character in the anime series Digimon Xros Wars
- Akari Ichijou (一条 あかり), a character in the video game The Last Blade
- Akari Kamigishi (神岸 あかり), a character in the visual novel To Heart
- Akari Kawamoto (川本 あかり), a character in the manga series March Comes in like a Lion
- Akari Kizuna (紲星 あかり), a Vocaloid and Voiceroid character
- Akari Kuzehashi (久世橋 朱里), a character in the manga series Kin-iro Mosaic
- Akari Mizunashi (水無 灯里), a character in the manga series Aria
- Akari Mizushima (水嶋 アカリ), a character in the anime series Chance Pop Session
- Akari Nitta (新田明), a character in the manga and anime series Jujutsu Kaisen
- Akari Oborodzuka (朧塚 朱莉), a character played by Hatsune Miku in the "Onibi Series", a series of songs by Masa Works Design
- Akari Shinohara (篠原 明里), a character in the anime film 5 Centimeters Per Second
- Akari Sakura (桜 あかり), a character in the anime series Jewelpet Twinkle
- Akari Taiyo (太陽 あかり), a character in the anime series Day Break Illusion
- Akari Tsukumo (九十九 明里), a character in the anime series Yu-Gi-Oh! Zexal
- Akari Unryu (雲竜 あかり), a character in the manga series Ranma ½
