= Rugby sevens at the 2019 SEA Games – Men's tournament =

Rugby Sevens – Men's tournament at the 2019 SEA Games
- Venue: Clark Parade Grounds
- Dates: 7–8 December 2019
- Nations: 6
- Teams: 6

The men's rugby sevens tournament at the 2019 Southeast Asian Games were held from 7 to 8 December 2019 in the Philippines. 7 Southeast Asian teams played in the men's competition.

All matches were played at the Clark Parade Grounds in Angeles City.

== Competition schedule ==
G	Group stage	PO	5th place play-off	B	3rd place play-off	F	Final

Sat 7	Sun 8			
G	G	PO	B	F

Source: 2019 SEA Games Official Calendar

== Participating nations ==
The following six teams participated for the men's competition.

- Indonesia (INA)
- Laos (LAO)
- Malaysia (MAS)
- Philippines (PHI)
- Singapore (SGP)
- Thailand (THA)

== Results ==
- All times are Philippine Standard Time (UTC+8).

=== Group stage ===
Pos	Team	Pld	W	D	L	PF	PA	PD	Pts	Final Result
1	Philippines (H)	5	5	0	0	162	26	+136	15	Advanced to Gold medal match
2	Malaysia	5	4	0	1	151	43	+108	13	Advanced to Gold medal match
3	Singapore	5	3	0	2	164	47	+117	11	Advanced to Bronze medal match
4	Thailand	5	2	0	3	113	81	+32	9	Advanced to Bronze medal match
5	Indonesia	5	1	0	4	47	188	−141	7	Advanced to 5th place playoff match
6	Laos	5	0	0	5	10	262	−252	5	Advanced to 5th place playoff match

Source: 2019 SEA Games Official Calendar
(H) Hosts

7 December 2019
10:20

Malaysia	38–0	Indonesia
	Report

Clark Parade Grounds, Angeles City

7 December 2019
10:40

Singapore	19–7	Thailand
	Report

Clark Parade Grounds, Angeles City

7 December 2019
11:00

Laos	0–43	Philippines
	Report

Clark Parade Grounds, Angeles City

7 December 2019
13:00

Malaysia	26–12	Singapore
	Report

Clark Parade Grounds, Angeles City

7 December 2019
13:20

Philippines	57–0	Indonesia
	Report

Clark Parade Grounds, Angeles City

7 December 2019
13:40

Laos	5–54	Thailand
	Report

Clark Parade Grounds, Angeles City

7 December 2019
15:40

Indonesia	0–57	Singapore
	Report

Clark Parade Grounds, Angeles City

7 December 2019
16:00

Thailand	14–24	Philippines
	Report

Clark Parade Grounds, Angeles City

7 December 2019
16:20

Laos	0–68	Malaysia
	Report

Clark Parade Grounds, Angeles City

8 December 2019
10:20

Philippines	14–12	Singapore
	Report

Clark Parade Grounds, Angeles City

8 December 2019
10:40

Indonesia	33–5	Laos
	Report

Clark Parade Grounds, Angeles City

8 December 2019
11:00

Thailand	7–19	Malaysia
	Report

Clark Parade Grounds, Angeles City

8 December 2019
13:00

Malaysia	0–24	Philippines
	Report

Clark Parade Grounds, Angeles City

8 December 2019
13:20

Thailand	31–14	Indonesia
	Report

Clark Parade Grounds, Angeles City

8 December 2019
13:40

Singapore	64–0	Laos
	Report

Clark Parade Grounds, Angeles City

=== Final round ===
5th place playoff

8 December 2019
15:20

Indonesia	21–7	Laos
	Report

Clark Parade Grounds, Angeles City

Bronze medal match

8 December 2019
16:00

Singapore	5–12	Thailand
	Report

Clark Parade Grounds, Angeles City

Gold medal match

8 December 2019
16:40

Philippines	19–0	Malaysia
	Report

Clark Parade Grounds, Angeles City

== See also ==
- Women's tournament
