= No Matter How I Look at It, It's You Guys' Fault I'm Not Popular! =

Japanese manga and anime series

- Cover of first volume, featuring Tomoko Kuroki

私がモテないのはどう考えてもお前らが悪い! (Watashi ga Motenai no wa Dō Kangaetemo Omaera ga Warui!)
- Genre: Dark comedy; Slice of life
- Manga
- Written by: Nico Tanigawa
- Published by: Square Enix
- English publisher: NA: Yen Press
- Magazine: Gangan Online
- Original run: August 4, 2011 – present
- Volumes: 29
- Manga

Watashi no Tomodachi ga Motenai no wa dō Kangaete mo Omaera ga Warui.
- Written by: Nico Tanigawa
- Published by: Square Enix
- Magazine: Gangan Joker
- Original run: January 22, 2013 – July 22, 2015
- Volumes: 1
- Anime television series
- Directed by: Shin Oonuma
- Produced by: Makoto Itō; Manami Watanabe; Hayato Kaneko; Masatoshi Ishizuka; Toshiaki Tanaka; Atsushi Aitani; Nobue Osamu; Kaho Yamada
- Written by: Takao Yoshioka
- Music by: Sadesper Record
- Studio: Silver Link
- Licensed by: AUS: Hanabee; NA: Sentai Filmworks; UK: MVM Films
- Original network: TV Tokyo, TV Aichi, TV Osaka, AT-X
- Original run: July 8, 2013 – September 23, 2013
- Episodes: 12 + OVA
- icon

No Matter How I Look at It, It's You Guys' Fault I'm Not Popular! (Japanese: 私がモテないのはどう考えてもお前らが悪い!, Hepburn: Watashi ga Motenai no wa Dō Kangaetemo Omaera ga Warui!), commonly referred to as WataMote (わたモテ), is a Japanese manga series written and illustrated by two people under the pseudonym Nico Tanigawa. It began serialization on Square Enix's Gangan Online service in August 2011 and is published by Yen Press in North America. A 4-panel spin-off manga was serialized in Gangan Joker between January 2013 and July 2015. An anime television adaptation by Silver Link aired in Japan between July and September 2013.

== Plot ==
Fifteen-year-old otaku Tomoko Kuroki believed that she would become popular when entering high school due to her experience with otome games and dating simulators. In reality, she finds that she has become an unsociable loner, though she still forces herself to try out what she has learned about achieving popularity. As she progresses through high school, Tomoko attempts to improve her social status among her peers.

== Characters ==
=== Main characters ===
Tomoko Kuroki (黒木 智子, Kuroki Tomoko)
Voiced by: Izumi Kitta (Japanese); Monica Rial (English)
Tomoko is depicted as a desperate, obsessive, depressed, and lonely girl who is characterized by her social anxiety, vivid facial expressions, and bags under her eyes. She has a grim and cynical outlook on life, as most of her thoughts involve insulting others or herself. She spends most of her days playing otome games and browsing the web, initially with very few personal connections. During her third year of high school, she decides to pursue a career as a novelist and applies to the Literature Department of Aoyama Gakuin University (青山学園大学, Aoyama Gakuin Daigaku), encouraging her new friends to do the same.
Tomoki Kuroki (黒木 智貴, Kuroki Tomoki)
Voiced by: Yuichi Nakamura, Akiko Seri (young) (Japanese); David Matranga (English)
Tomoki is Tomoko's gloomy brother, who is a year younger than she is. He is outwardly irritated by her odd behavior and often gets into arguments or fights with her. Because he has friends and is a talented soccer player, Tomoko occasionally intrudes upon his room for advice on making friends or improving herself, much to his annoyance.
Yuu Naruse (成瀬 優, Naruse Yū)
Voiced by: Kana Hanazawa (Japanese); Emily Neves (English)
Yū is Tomoko's best friend since their second year of junior high school. Initially a dorky-looking girl with glasses, she enters Makuharihongo High School (幕張本郷高等学校, Makuharihongō Kōtōgakkō) with newfound blonde hair and a lively attitude, much to Tomoko's surprise. Even after her radical makeover and relationship with a boyfriend (with whom she later breaks up), she continues to regard Tomoko as her best friend when they reunite, referring to her by the nickname "Mokocchi". She is the star of the 4-panel spin-off manga. She later befriends Tomoko's classmates and schoolmates during a summer study camp in their third year. She is aiming to enter the same school as Tomoko, Aoyama Gakuin University.
Yuri Tamura (田村 ゆり, Tamura Yuri)
Tomoko's second- and third-year classmate and friend who is often seen with Yoshida and Mako. Often silent and gloomy, she gets upset whenever Tomoko gets along with other people. Tomoko believes that she is a covert pervert based on her interest in reading an ecchi manga on a platform introduced to her by Tomoko. She is also shown to be very strong.
Hina Nemoto (根元 陽菜, Nemoto Hina)
Voiced by: Yuuko Kurose (Japanese)
Tomoko's first- to third-year classmate and friend who secretly wants to become a voice actress. Initially considered part of the popular crowd, she opens up about her true otaku nature after Tomoko learns of her dream. Tomoko discovers that she is actually innocent with regards to sexuality despite teasing Akane about it. Hina and Yuri have a friendly rivalry, with each competing to outdo the other in getting closer to Tomoko. She aspires to enroll at Morinaga University (森永大学, Morinaga Daigaku).
Asuka Katou (加藤 明日香, Katō Asuka)
Tomoko's classmate from second year to third year and friend. She is a stylish gyaru who is kind towards Tomoko, who in turn admires her as a motherly figure. Like Tomoko, she aspires to enroll in Aoyama Gakuin University.

=== Tomoko's family ===
Tomoko's mother (智子の母親, Tomoko no Hahaoya)
Voiced by: Risa Hayamizu (Japanese); Shelley Calene-Black (English)
Tomoko and Tomoki's mother, who is often concerned about her daughter's well-being.
Kiko Satozaki (里崎 希心, Satozaki Kiko) / Kii (きーちゃん, Kī-chan)
Voiced by: Rie Kugimiya (Japanese); Juliet Simmons (English)
Tomoko's little cousin who is three years younger than she is. Initially looking up to Tomoko as a big sister, she later begins to pity her after she realizes she lies to impress her. She is described by Tomoko as a "psychopath", as while she was emotional as a young child, she later becomes deadpan and overtly emotional around Tomoko, and emotionless around most other people.
Tomoko's father (智子の父親, Tomoko no Chichioya)
Voiced by: Ryō Iwasaki (Japanese)
Tomoko and Tomoki's salaryman father.

=== Harajuku High School ===
Megumi Imae (今江 恵美, Imae Megumi)
Voiced by: Ai Nonaka (Japanese); Juliet Simmons (English)
The kind-hearted former student council president at Tomoko's school, who has shown the most affection towards Tomoko. She is now a freshman at Aoyama Gakuin University. She owns a dog named Maro (マロ).
Kotomi Komiyama (小宮山 琴美, Komiyama Kotomi)
Voiced by: Kaori Mizuhashi (Japanese)
Tomoko and Yuu's classmate in second year of junior high school, who first appears in the spin-off manga and is later revealed to be attending Tomoko's high school. She and Tomoko outright dislike each other, only pretending to get along when Yuu is around. She has an excessive crush on Tomoki and is obsessed with the Chiba Lotte Marines baseball team. Tomoko's classmate in third year of high school.
Masaki Yoshida (吉田 茉咲, Yoshida Masaki)
Tomoko's second- and third-year classmate and friend who has a scary appearance and is often referred to as a delinquent by Tomoko. She often acts violently towards Tomoko when she goes too far, and also likes cute things. Like Akane and Hina, she is shown to be rather innocent when it comes to sex-related subjects.
Mako Tanaka (田中 真子, Tanaka Mako)
Tomoko's second- and third-year classmate and friend who is also Yuri's best friend. She is generally kind-hearted, though a misunderstanding causes Tomoko to believe she's a lesbian. She aspires to enroll at Chiba-Nishi University (千葉西大学, Chiba-Nishi Daigaku).
Emiri Uchi (内 笑美莉, Uchi Emiri)
Tomoko's second-year classmate, nicknamed Ucchi (うっちー, Utchī) by her friends, who becomes increasingly conscious of Tomoko's behavior and eventually develops an obsession with her. She is often noted for having emoji-like expressions and for appearing out of nowhere.
Akane Okada (岡田 茜, Okada Akane)
Voiced by: Ayaka Asai (Japanese)
Hina's best friend who has a distinguishing hairstyle, and Tomoko's first- to third-year classmate. She initially had reservations about Hina's aspirations to become a voice actress, but quickly accepts it thanks to Tomoko's indirect help.
Koharu Minami (南 小陽, Minami Koharu)
Tomoko's second- and third-year classmate, a girl with a fanged appearance who is friends with Mako and often speaks badly of Tomoko. She develops an uneasy friendship with Shiki after a falling-out with Sachi and her clique.
Hikari Itou (伊藤 光, Itō Hikari)
Kotomi's best friend and Tomoko's third-year classmate, who is often bewildered by Kotomi's creepier moments. She is good at observing other people.
Fuuka Sasaki (佐々木 風夏, Sasaki Fūka)
One of Asuka's friends in another class. She has a strange curiosity with Asuka and Tomoko's interactions with one another, bordering on obsession. Tomoko nicknames her "Sleazy Maiden" and "Gorilla" because of her rather intrusive questions. Fuuka often attempts to one-up Tomoko by showing off her shallow knowledge of sex, which backfires due to her inexperience. As a result, she is the subject of many rumors circulating around the school and is labeled an "idiot" by Miho.
Miho Narita (成田 美保, Narita Miho)
Asuka and Fuuka's friend. She is a cheerful and playful girl who likes teasing Fuuka and Tomoko.
Akari Iguchi (井口 朱里, Iguchi Akari)
Voiced by: Unknown (Japanese)
A girl in Tomoko's school who is in love with Tomoki, but constantly has her reputation damaged by Tomoko.
Sayaka Yoda (与田 紗弥加, Yoda Sayaka)
Voiced by: Unknown (Japanese)
Akari's best friend whose attempts at pairing Akari up with Tomoki prove to do more harm than good. She likes Nakamura, her classmate and a member of the soccer club.
Anna (杏奈, Anna) and Rena (麗奈, Rena)
Masaki's friends in her "delinquent" clique.
Shiki Futaki (二木 四季, Futaki Shiki)
Nicknamed "Emoji Mk.II" by Tomoko, she is Tomoko's classmate and friend during their third year. She aspires to be a professional gamer and streamer.
Shizuku Hirasawa (平沢 雫, Hirasawa Shizuku)
A first-year student in Tomoko's third year who looks up to Tomoko for helping her pass her entrance exams. She has trouble making female friends because her female classmates envy her popularity with boys.
Sachi Mima (美馬 サチ, Mima Sachi)
One of Koharu's friends, who enjoys talking behind people's backs and is largely responsible for Koharu's behavior. She seems to have an interest in Tomoki.
Ogino (荻野, Ogino)
Voiced by: Sanae Nakata (Japanese)
Tomoko's eccentric homeroom teacher who often encourages her to make friends, much to her chagrin.

== Media ==
=== Manga ===
Written by two people under the pseudonym Nico Tanigawa, WataMote began serialization on Square Enix's Gangan Online service on August 4, 2011. The first tankōbon volume was released on January 21, 2012, with 29 volumes and an official fan book released as of November 12, 2026. An anthology was released on June 22, 2013. The second volume, released on May 22, 2012, ranked No. 10 in the Oricon charts in its opening week. As of July 2013, the series has printed over 1.5 million copies. The manga gained popularity overseas after fan translations of the series were posted on the English-speaking imageboard 4chan, the Western equivalent of Japan's Futaba Channel. Yen Press has licensed the manga in North America and the UK, and began releasing the series from October 29, 2013.

A spin-off 4-panel manga series, Watashi no Tomodachi ga Motenai no wa Dō Kangaetemo Omaera ga Warui. (私の友達がモテないのはどう考えてもお前らが悪い。; lit. 'No Matter How I Look at It, It's You Guys' Fault My Friend's Not Popular.'), known as TomoMote (トモモテ) for short, ran in Square Enix's Gangan Joker magazine between January 22, 2013, and July 22, 2015, and was collected into one volume released on August 22, 2015. A novel anthology written by Nico Tanigawa, Masaki Tsuji, Yugo Aosaki, Sako Aizawa and Van Madoy was released on November 15, 2019.

In the Yen Press English version, individual chapters are called "Fails" and are preceded with "I'm Not Popular, So".

No.	Original release date	Original ISBN	English release date	English ISBN
1	January 21, 2012	978-4-757-53480-3	October 29, 2013	978-0-31-624316-2
1. I'll try a little makeover.; 2. I'll be shy.; 3. I'll see an old friend.; 4. I'll take a little detour.; 5. I'll take shelter.; 6. I'll play video games.; 7. I'll just live my life.; 8. I'll focus on the unseen.; 9. I'll draw a portrait.
Tomoko Kuroki is a "mojyo" (喪女, mojo), a girl who has no experience with boys. In her first two months of high school, she has not made any friends or met any boys. She gives herself a makeover in hair, glasses, and facial expression. Later, she tries to socialize with her younger brother. She meets with her friend Yuu-chan, a middle school friend who has since become very attractive. While her classmates go for karaoke, Tomoko visits a bookstore instead, but encounters the classmates at a fast food place afterwards. While it rains, she gets stuck at a rest stop with some boys. After overhearing that girls who have had sex generate more hormones to look better, she plays more otome games at home. Tomoko feels a bit sick at school. She and Yuu shop for panties. She and a boy are tasked with drawing each other for a make-up art assignment.
2	May 22, 2012	978-4-757-53597-8	January 21, 2014	978-0-31-632204-1
10. I'll be expressionless.; 11. I'll trust my fortune a bit.; 12. I'll go see the fireworks.; 13. I'll revel in the summer break.; 14. I'll be a show-off.; 15. I'll have a reunion.; 16. I'll redeem myself.; 17. I'll go to a meet and greet.; 18. Summer is ending.; Special chapter
Tomoko tries to go a whole day without showing expression. She suffers a string of bad luck. At the end of the first term, she tries to find someone to watch fireworks with. She spends a week of summer break doing practically nothing. She tries to look mature when her younger cousin Kii visits, and pretends to be in a relationship with a guy she meets at the library. Kii observes Tomoko at a candy store where the latter plays collectible card games. At a meet and greet, she has a voice actor from one of her otome games record an embarrassing line for her. During the Cygnids meteor shower, she struggles to find a boy to share the experience with. In the special chapter, Tomoko goes shopping and wins a massage wand.
3	December 22, 2012	978-4-757-53818-4	April 22, 2014	978-0-31-632205-8
19. Second term is starting.; 20. I'll make preparations.; 21. I'll be in the culture fest.; 22. I'll get my picture taken.; 23. The weather's lousy.; 24. I'll get groped.; 25. I'll nurse the sick.; 26. I'll start my own club.; 27. I'll have a nice dream.
Tomoko's class changes seating, but Tomoko does not make new friends and hides in a group of desks during lunch. In prepping for the school's culture festival, she tries to fit in by taking on miscellaneous jobs. During the festival, she meets up with her friend Yuu. She tries a photo booth. She has a rainy bad hair day and looks for her umbrella. She is bothered that she is not attractive enough to be groped on a train, but then it happens. Following an accident in P.E., Tomoko returns home, where she nurses her brother who has a cold in order to try to catch it. She tries to start a school club. In order to experience lewd dreams, she tries sleeping on her stomach.
4	June 22, 2013	978-4-757-53980-8	July 22, 2014	978-0-31-637674-7
28. I'll try out the nightlife 29. I'll make a cake.; 30. I'll run.; 31. I'll be delusional.; 32. The year's ending.; Special chapter 2; 33. I'll greet the New Year.; 34. I'll stand out.; 35. I'll mother my brother.; 36. I'll become an adult.
Tomoko reconsiders working as a cabaret girl after visiting the red light district. She tries for a job making cakes, only to end up with a not-so-glamorous factory job. On a school run, she needs to go to the bathroom. She is embarrassed when Yuu reminds her of her delusional career plans from middle school. She is surprised to find her brother's affectionate essay from elementary school. She is invited to a Christmas party, but wanders off to spend time alone. On a New Year's shrine visit with Kii, Tomoko is embarrassed by Kii's maturity. When a cockroach enters the class, she kills it hoping to be praised as a hero, only to leave a less than desirable impression on her classmates. She forgets to mail Tomoki's high school application and tries to win his forgiveness. On her birthday, she catches up with Yuu over coffee.
5	September 21, 2013	978-4-757-54064-4	October 28, 2014	978-0-31-633609-3
37. I'll attend graduation.; 38. I'll be misunderstood.; 39. I'll introduce myself.; 40. I'll build up my appeal.; 41. I'll use a point system.; 42. I'll just live my life (second year).; 43. I'll develop an interest in nudity.; 44. I'll study for exams.; 45. I'll kill time.; 46. I'll run into an old acquaintance.
6	March 22, 2014	978-4-757-54025-5; 978-4-7575-4024-8 (special edition)	January 20, 2015	978-0-31-625941-5
47. I'll remember an old acquaintance.; 48. I'll fight low-key.; 49. I'll decide where to go.; 50. I'll hang out by myself in a twilit classroom.; 51. I'll take notice of the same sex.; 52. I'll write a song.; 53. Something good will happen.; 54. I'll won't change.; 55. It's Tanabata.; Special chapter 3
7	October 22, 2014	978-4-757-54121-4; 978-4-7575-4122-1 (special edition)	May 19, 2015	978-0-31-634201-8
56. I'll worry about B.O.; 57. I'll start my second summer break.; 58. I'll waste time.; 59. I'll cheer them on.; 60. I'll become a dog.; 61. I'll terrorize; 62. I'll go back home.; 63. I want to prolong summer break.; 64. I'll do summer break in a trio.; 65. I'll go to the beach.; 66. I'll use the power of suggestion.
8	August 22, 2015	978-4-757-54713-1	March 22, 2016	978-0-31-631494-7
67. I'll become a princess.; 68. I'll idle through second term.; 69. I'll pick my group.; 70. I'll go shopping by myself.; 71. I'll depart.; 72. I'll arrive in Kyoto.; 73. I won't groom.; 74. I'll do a group activity.; 75. I'll buy souvenirs.; 76. I'll aim for the top.; 77. I'll embrace the second night.; Special chapter 4
9	March 22, 2016	978-4-757-54911-1	November 22, 2016	978-0-31-655273-8
78. I'll have a sleepless night.; 79. I'll do whatever i want.; 80. It's the last night of the class trip.; 81. I'll drop by Akihabara.; 82. I'll return to normal life.; 83. I'll tell a lie.; 84. A certain day in autumn.; 85. I'll get a pat on the head.; 86. The sports festival goes underway.; 87. I'll have a sports fest palate cleanser.; 88. I'll lose.; Special chapter 5
10	October 22, 2016	978-4-757-55125-1	July 18, 2017	978-0-31-643971-8
89. I'll forget something.; 90. I'll think about the future.; 91. I'll have a chance encounter.; 92. I'll suddenly get dragged into a game.; 93. I'll give someone a present.; 94. My little brother plays soccer.; 95. It's the end of autumn.; 96. I'll study for exams.; 97. I'll eat in the cafeteria.; 98. It's a winter rain.; Special chapter 6
11	March 22, 2017	978-4-757-55277-7	December 19, 2017	978-0-31-641412-8
99. I'm a friend of a friend.; 100. I won't change?; 101. I can get my feelings across.; 102. One winter break...; 103. I'll have the year's first dream.; 104. Kii-chan is not normal.; 105. I'll give in return.; 106. It's the last winter.; 107. I attract concern.; 108. Little bro has something on his mind.; 109. I'm at school on a snowy day.; Special chapter 7
12	February 22, 2018	978-4-757-55624-9	November 13, 2018	978-1-97-532817-7
110. I'll cheer on the examinees.; 111. I'll picture my New Game+.; 112. I'll enjoy Valentine's Day. part 1; 113. I'll enjoy Valentine's Day. part 2; 114. I'll enjoy Valentine's Day. part 3; 115. I'll attend my second graduation ceremony.; 116. I'll attend my second graduation ceremony. side story; 117. I'll greet the end of the second year.; 118. I'll get cocky.; 119. I'll go to a party.; 120. I'll attend the party.; 121. I'll hang out with Dad.; 122. I'll begin my third year.
13	July 21, 2018	978-4-757-55777-2	March 26, 2019	978-1-975-30344-0
123. Little Bro comes by class 3-5.; 124. There are friendships.; 125. The field trip begins.; 126. I'll get called by a nickname.; 127. I'll join in.; 128. I'll make the rounds.; 129. I'll explain.; 130. The field trip ends.; 131. We're field tripping all the way home.; 132. I'm a senpai with a kouhai
14	January 22, 2019	978-4-7575-5976-9	October 15, 2019	978-1-9753-3182-5
133. I'll make connections.; 134. People around me are Rowdy.; 135. I'll try on a mask (character).; 136. I'll recommend a manga.; 137. Golden Week is coming.; 138. I'll go to college.; 139. It's the reason im going to college.; 140. I'll take part in an open campus.; 141. I'll take Kii-chan to high school.; 142. I'll decide Kii-chans career path.
15	May 11, 2019	978-4-7575-5976-9	January 28, 2020	978-1-9753-3297-6
143. We'll study as a trio.; 144. We'll call each other by name.; Special chapter 8; 145. One day in third year...; 146. Until the rain stops...; 147. I'll take a detour on my own.; 148. I'll shorten it.; 149. I'll be a senpai.; 150. I'll bestow laurels.
16	November 12, 2019	978-4-7575-6378-0	July 21, 2020	978-1-9753-1377-7
151. I'll Triumph.; 152. It's me and (･_･).; 153. It's the second class matchup.; 154. I'll end the class matchups.; 155. I'll Fondle.; 156. I'll get talked about.; 157. They hear I'm suspended.; 158. I'm suspended.; 159. I'm still suspended.
17	March 12, 2020	978-4-7575-6553-1	December 15, 2020	978-1-9753-1790-4
160. It's my last day of suspension.; 161. Things are back to normal.; 162. I'll make a wish.; 163. It's summer.; 164. I'll work hard over summer break.; 165. My last summer break of high school begins.; 166. I'll go cheer them on again.; 167. I won't waste my time.; 168. We'll meet up at my little brother's room.
18	July 10, 2020	978-4-7575-6665-1; 978-4-7575-6666-8 (special edition)	July 13, 2021	978-1-9753-2460-5
169. Here's little bro's fetish.; 170. I'll dye.; 171. It's summer training camp.; 172. It's the first night of summer training camp.; 173. Those others are...; Special chapter 9; 174. Here's life at training camp.; 175. The training camp ends.; 176. I'll do a let's play.; Special chapter 10
19	February 12, 2021	978-4-7575-7091-7	May 17, 2022	978-1-9753-4074-2
177. I'll first go to Summer-Ket.; 178. I'll have a slumber party and watch anime.; 179. I'll do dub acting.; 180. I'll drink something.; 181. I'll go on a drive.; 182. It's summer's end and the beach.; 183. A typhoon is coming.; 184. School has started.
20	September 10, 2021	978-4-7575-7232-4	September 20, 2022	978-1-9753-4778-9
185. I'm free to choose my seat.; 186. I'll give a presentation.; 187. I don't know that person.; 188. It's about that girl.; 189. It ends at some point.; 190. We're friends?; 191. I'll do it all over again.; 192. It's the days leading up to the culture fest.
21	March 11, 2022	978-4-7575-7232-4	September 19, 2023	978-1-9753-7177-7
193. I'll go out for ramen.; 194. There's no such day.; 195. I'm a character.; 196. I'm making no progress on the movie.; 197. I'll make a little progress.; 198. I'll go to Yuu-chan's school.; 199. It's fall of third year.; Special chapter 11; Special chapter 12
22	October 12, 2022	978-4-7575-8200-2	February 20, 2024	978-1-9753-8973-4
200. Since it's chapter 200, here are five vignettes of the best pairings chosen for our tenth anniversary.; 201. I'll sleep on it.; 202. I'll start making the movie.; 203. Here are other fest goings-on.; 204. It's a little longer until the culture fest.; 205. I'll flex on this girls.; Special chapter 13; Special chapter 14
23	May 11, 2023	978-4-7575-8572-0	June 18, 2024	978-1-9753-9038-9
206. It's erotic acting.; 207. It's the first feed in a year.; 208. It's yuri?; 209. It's the baseball game.; 210. It's culture fest prep week.; 211. There's a betrayal.; 212. It's the final scene.; Special chapter 15
24	November 10, 2023	978-4-7575-8900-1	October 15, 2024	979-8-8554-0231-5
213. It's the day before the culture fest.; 214. It's fest eve.; 215. It's the start of culture fest.; 216. I'll screen the movie.; Special chapter 16; Special chapter 17
25	July 11, 2024	978-4-7575-9301-5	July 22, 2025	979-8-8554-1601-5
217. It's scenes from the culture fest.; 218. It's the first Kuroki kiss.; 219. It's the respective kiss aftermaths.; 220. It's culture fest day 1; 221. I'm depopularized.; Special chapter 18; Special chapter 19
26	February 12, 2025	978-4-7575-9673-3	February 17, 2026	979-8-8554-2465-2
222. It's a live show.; 223. I'll get attached.; 224. I'll end culture fest day 1.; 225. Here's something left behind.; 226. It's day 2 of the culture fest.
27	July 11, 2025	978-4-7575-9954-3	August 25, 2026	979-8-8554-3612-9
28	March 12, 2026	978-4-301-00391-5	—	—
29	November 12, 2026	978-4-301-00881-1	—	—

=== Anime ===
An anime television adaptation of the manga was announced to have been greenlit in an advertising for the third manga volume on December 20, 2012. The television series was produced by Silver Link and aired between July 8 and September 23, 2013. The series is directed by Shin Oonuma and written by Takao Yoshioka, with character design by Hideki Furukawa. An original video animation episode was released with the seventh manga volume on October 22, 2014.

The opening theme is "Watashi ga Motenai no wa dō Kangaetemo Omaera ga Warui!" (私がモテないのはどう考えてもお前らが悪い!; "No Matter How I Look at It, It's You Guys' Fault I'm Not Popular!") by Konomi Suzuki and Kiba of Akiba, which reached No. 43 on the Japan Hot 100. The main ending theme, featured in all but four episodes, is "Dō Kangaetemo Watashi wa Warukunai" (どう考えても私は悪くない; "No Matter How I Look At It, It's Not My Fault") by Izumi Kitta. It charted at No. 79 in Japan.

The ending themes for episodes two and five are "Musō Renka" (夢想恋歌; Dream Love Song) and "Yoru no Tobari yo Sayōnara" (夜のとばりよ さようなら; Farewell, Veil of Darkness) respectively, both performed by Velvet.Kodhy. The ending theme for episode six is "Natsu Matsuri" (夏祭り; Summer Festival) by Utsu-P & Toka Minatsuki, featuring vocals by Hatsune Miku (a cover of the original 1990 hit song by Jitterin' Jinn). The ending theme for episode eleven is "Sokora no Chaku-Gurumi no Fūsen to Watashi" (そこらの着ぐるみの風船と私; Me and the Balloon I Got from the Costumed Person) by Velvet.Kodhy and μ.

The series was simulcast by Crunchyroll. Sentai Filmworks licensed the series in North America and released it on Blu-ray and DVD on August 26, 2014. After the acquisition of Crunchyroll by Sony Pictures Television, the series, among several other Sentai Filmworks titles, was dropped from the Crunchyroll streaming service on March 31, 2022.

==== Episodes ====
No.	Title (Note: English episode titles taken from Crunchyroll.)	Directed and storyboarded by	Written by	Original release date
1	"Since I'm Not Popular, I'll Change My Image a Bit" "Motenai shi, Chotto Imechen suru wa" (モテないし、ちょっとイメチェンするわ)	Shin Oonuma	Takao Yoshioka	July 8, 2013
Tomoko Kuroki believes she'd be popular upon entering high school, having spent countless hours playing otome games. However, two months have passed and she hasn't made a single friend, let alone a boyfriend. After taking a look in the mirror, she realizes she is not the girl she thought herself to be. Wanting to change, Tomoko goes to her brother Tomoki to try to learn to conduct a conversation with a boy, which only irritates him. The next day, Tomoko tries doing 'high school girl' things, such as reading in a book shop and eating at a fast-food restaurant, but they do little to raise her self-esteem.
2	"Since I'm Not Popular, I'll See My Old Friend" "Motenai shi, Mukashi no Tomodachi ni Au" (モテないし、昔の友達に会う)	Masato Jinbo	Sawako Hirabayashi	July 15, 2013
Tomoko receives a call from her old middle school friend, Yū Naruse, asking to meet up. Anxious due to her uneventful high school life, Tomoko attempts to better herself beforehand. She is required to remain after school to complete a missed assignment, during which she is paired with a male classmate in the art room to draw portraits of each other. Despite an awkward start, she is moved by his drawing of her. On the day of the meeting, Tomoko is surprised to find that Yū's appearance has changed significantly since she last saw her, but feels relieved that she is still the same on the inside. After spending the day at the arcade, Tomoko feels encouraged by Yū to keep doing her best, only to become depressed again after hearing she has a boyfriend.
3	"Since I'm Not Popular, the Weather's Bad" "Motenai shi, Akutenkō" (モテないし、悪天候)	Jin Tamamura	Ayumi Sekine	July 22, 2013
On a rainy day, Tomoko has a difficult time at school. While heading home, her umbrella breaks, forcing her to take shelter where she awkwardly attempts to converse with two boys who join her. After being sent home early the next day after being hit by a basketball, Tomoko decides to tease Tomoki who is sick with a cold (caused by Tomoko herself), later becoming depressed when his female classmates come to deliver his homework.
4	"Since I'm Not Popular, I'll Have a Good Dream" "Motenai shi, Chotto Ii Yume Miru wa" (モテないし、ちょっといい夢見るわ)	Yoshinobu Tokumoto	Takayo Ikami	July 29, 2013
Tomoko tries to follow an online guide on having erotic dreams, but only winds up having nightmares. Later, she ends up stuck on a crowded train, where she fears she is being molested only to find that she had just gotten caught on another girl's practice naginata. Afterwards, Tomoko asks Yū to help her shop for some underwear, though she later ends up embarrassing herself by mistaking her newly bought panties for a handkerchief. She soon feels better after winning a massager from a raffle ticket which came from a BL game.
5	"Since I'm Not Popular, I'll Boost My Skills" "Motenai shi, Sukiru Appu Shitemiru" (モテないし、スキルアップしてみる)	Directed by: Yasuo Iwamoto; Storyboarded by: Masayoshi Nishida	Takayo Ikami	August 5, 2013
Tomoko attempts to become popular by playing a cool, silent character, but it does not play out how she had hoped. Later, she tries to get some photo stickers taken of her, though is less than pleased with the results. The next day, in another attempt to improve her social skills, Tomoko contemplates taking up a job as a cabaret girl and decides to practise lighting cigarettes and mixing drinks. However, she becomes less eager when she travels to the red-light district the following night.
6	"Since I'm Not Popular, I'll Go See the Fireworks" "Motenai shi, Hanabi ni Iku" (モテないし、花火に行く)	Tomoka Nagaoka	Ayumi Sekine	August 12, 2013
After noticing she looks somewhat cuter following a night of playing otome games, Tomoko believes she can grow even more cute by constantly playing erotic games. Unbeknownst to her, she is only becoming greasier from not bathing. Later, after accidentally spraying herself with soda, she believes she is getting looks from other boys, who are actually noticing the ants crawling over her body as a result. The next day, Tomoko tries to find people to go watch the fireworks with, to no avail. As Tomoko decides to go alone to an abandoned rooftop to watch the fireworks, she is joined by a pair of schoolboys and ends up watching a very different kind of 'fireworks' with them.
7	"Since I'm Not Popular, I'll Enjoy Summer Vacation" "Motenai shi, Natsuyasumi o Makitsu suru" (モテないし、夏休みを満喫する)	Junya Koshiba	Ayumi Sekine	August 19, 2013
After spending several days doing nothing but playing games, reading manga and browsing the internet, Tomoko comes to the realization that she is wasting her summer vacation. To alleviate this, Tomoko buys a webcam in the hopes of becoming an internet personality, only to back out under the pressure. Later, she discovers she has a ticket enabling her to meet an otome game voice actor and request a line from him. After spending the whole night looking up what to make him say, she ends up cracking under pressure when she finally meets him, resulting in a long and jumbled request. She attempts to mix it with her own voice to form a dubious dialogue, which her mother ends up hearing.
8	"Since I'm Not Popular, I'll Put on Airs" "Motenai shi, Mie o Haru" (モテないし、見栄をはる)	Jin Tamamura	Sawako Hirabayashi	August 26, 2013
Tomoko grows anxious when she learns her cousin, Kī, is coming over, feeling she needs to look like a 'bitch' in order to back up her prior fabrications of a relationship. She attempts to cover her body with hickeys using a vacuum cleaner, only to be beaten by her mother. While taking Kī to the library, Tomoko meets Kōsaka, one of the boys she met while sheltering from the rain the other day, who Kī assumes to be Tomoko's boyfriend. The next day, they see him with another girl, prompting Kī to confront him and bringing Tomoko's bluff to light. With Kī's impression of her waning, Tomoko attempts to restore her faith by showing off her prowess in a children's card game. After witnessing Tomoko cheat against a little boy, Kī starts to pity her instead of looking up to her.
9	"Since I'm Not Popular, Summer Will End" "Motenai shi, Natsu ga Owaru" (モテないし、夏が終わる)	Yoshinobu Tokumoto	Takayo Ikami	September 2, 2013
After Tomoko visits a fancy café where Yū is helping out, she decides to take up a job making cakes in the hopes of also becoming trendy, only for it to turn out to be a not-so-glamorous factory job. Later, Tomoko's mother forces her to do some cleaning, where she finds an essay written years ago by Tomoki describing how he once looked up to his older sister. Dejected, Tomoko goes to see a meteor shower alone, where she is joined by a stray male cat, inadvertently fulfilling her wish to watch the shower with a boy.
10	"Since I'm Not Popular, Second Term Is Starting" "Motenai shi, Ni-gakki ga Hajimaru" (モテないし、二学期が始まる)	Directed by: Yoshinobu Tokumoto; Storyboarded by: Masayoshi Nishida	Takao Yoshioka	September 9, 2013
The second school term begins and Tomoko is still as unpopular as ever, made worse when she is relocated into the center of the class. She manages to find herself a secret spot amongst a pile of unused desks where she can eat and play games in private during lunch breaks, but it is eventually cleaned up. As the school prepares for a culture festival, Tomoko contemplates starting her own club, but her application is denied due to being too vague.
11	"Since I'm Not Popular, I'll Participate in the Culture Festival" "Motenai shi, Bunkasai ni Sankasuru" (モテないし、文化祭に参加する)	Tomoka Nagaoka	Takao Yoshioka	September 16, 2013
Whilst trying to get involved with her class for the culture festival preparations, Tomoko accidentally cuts herself but is helped out by the kind festival committee president, Megumi Imae. During the festival, Tomoko has little reason to enjoy herself, but nonetheless receives encouragement from Megumi. The next day, Tomoko is visited by Yū, unsuccessfully trying to get an intimate hug from her but still appreciating the time spent together. Noticing Tomoko visibly downhearted after Yū leaves, Megumi borrows a mascot costume in order to anonymously give Tomoko a balloon and a comforting hug.
12	"Since I'm Not Popular, I'll Think About the Future" "Motenai shi, Shōrai o Kangaeru" (モテないし、将来を考える)	Shin Oonuma	Takao Yoshioka	September 23, 2013
As Tomoko reflects on her cringeworthy yet uneventful past and thinks about her future, she views Megumi as the kind of student she should aim to become. When a cockroach roams about the class, Tomoko kills it hoping to be praised as a hero, only to leave a less than desirable impression on her classmates. Later that day, Tomoko tries to initiate a conversation with Megumi, but runs off after a blustery wind ruins the mood, not staying to hear Megumi's words of praise about her. The episode ends with Tomoko dismissing the "mojyo" (喪女, mojo) definition from the first episode as trivial, as she has apparently learned to be happy on her own terms rather than on society's.
OVA	"Since I'm Not Popular, I'll Become an Enigma" "Motenai shi, Nazo Meitemiru" (モテないし、謎めいてみる)	Yoshinobu Tokumoto	Takao Yoshioka	October 22, 2014
Tomoko discusses how to make WataMote's second season a success with Yū and Kī, only to be informed that a second season is highly unlikely. Three years ago in middle school, a boy named Aomatsu encounters a mysterious girl on the school rooftop, revealed to be Tomoko putting on a chūnibyō act.

== Reception ==
WataMote has been the subject of much discussion and debate, particularly in its depiction of social anxiety and the main character Tomoko. Many have debated if the series is a comedy or a study of neurosis, with many varying opinions on whether the subject matter is supposed to be humorous or not. Still, the anime adaptation has been highly praised by most websites, particularly for its main character Tomoko and Izumi Kitta's portrayal of her. Among the most praised aspects of the series, the opening title sequence has received unanimous praise for its opening song and visuals, and how well it represents Tomoko's loneliness, frustration, and intense social anxiety.

In response to WataMote taking the top spot in a poll for Kotaku readers' choice for best anime of the season, Kotaku contributor and anime critic Richard Eisenbeis wrote an extremely negative review for the series, describing the show as being the "most mean-spirited" anime that he had ever viewed as a critic and fan. He criticized the show's main source of humor—the protagonist's social anxiety disorder—as being demeaning to the mentally ill, and he rebuked those who watched it for enjoying the suffering of someone else in order to feel better about themselves.

On the other hand, Anime News Network's review compared the series to other well-known series dealing with subject of social misfits, such as Welcome to the NHK and Genshiken. It suggested that Tomoko is portrayed as a completely anti-moe character, since she is angry and vengeful instead of typically cheery. The review praised the series for being insightful and straightforward in its treatment of social maladjustment.

In 2023, Norbert Daniels Jr. wrote an article for Anime News Network noting that in the ten years since the manga started, it had transitioned from a cringe comedy centered around Tomoko's social maladjustment to a more optimistic story with a larger cast and some yuri undertones, with Tomoko's own growth as a character being apparent. He also suggested that Bocchi the Rock! and Komi Can't Communicate, anime which also feature protagonists with social anxiety, may in part owe their popularity to WataMote paving the way for them.
