= Akari (manga) =

Japanese manga series

- Cover of the volume

あかり
- Genre: Slice of life
- Manga
- Written by: Marco Kohinata
- Published by: HERO'S Inc.
- English publisher: NA: Glacier Bay Books
- Imprint: HERO'S Comics Flat
- Magazine: Comiplex
- Original run: April 29, 2022 – May 27, 2022
- Volumes: 1

Akari (あかり) is a Japanese manga series written and illustrated by Marco Kohinata. It was serialized on Hero's Inc's Comiplex manga website between April and May 2022, with its chapters compiled into a single volume.

== Synopsis ==
Kagari is a stained glass artist who has lost his will to live due to the passing of his wife. One day, his long-lost grand-daughter Akari comes in to visit him, and they gradually bond over stained glass art. However, there's a reason Akari came in that she has not disclosed to him yet.

== Publication ==
Written and illustrated by Marco Kohinata, Akari was serialized on HERO'S Inc.'s Comiplex manga website between April 29, and May 27, 2022. Its chapters were compiled into a single tankōbon volume that was released on June 15, 2022. The series was licensed by Glacier Bay Books for English publication.

No.	Original release date	Original ISBN	North American release date	North American ISBN
1	June 15, 2022	978-4-86468-885-7	October 15, 2026	978-1-953629-53-1

== Reception ==
The series was nominated in the Best One-Shot category at the 3rd American Manga Awards in 2026.

== See also ==
- Hei no Naka no Biyōshitsu, another series illustrated by Marco Kohinata
