= Yumemiru Adolescence =

Japanese idol girl group

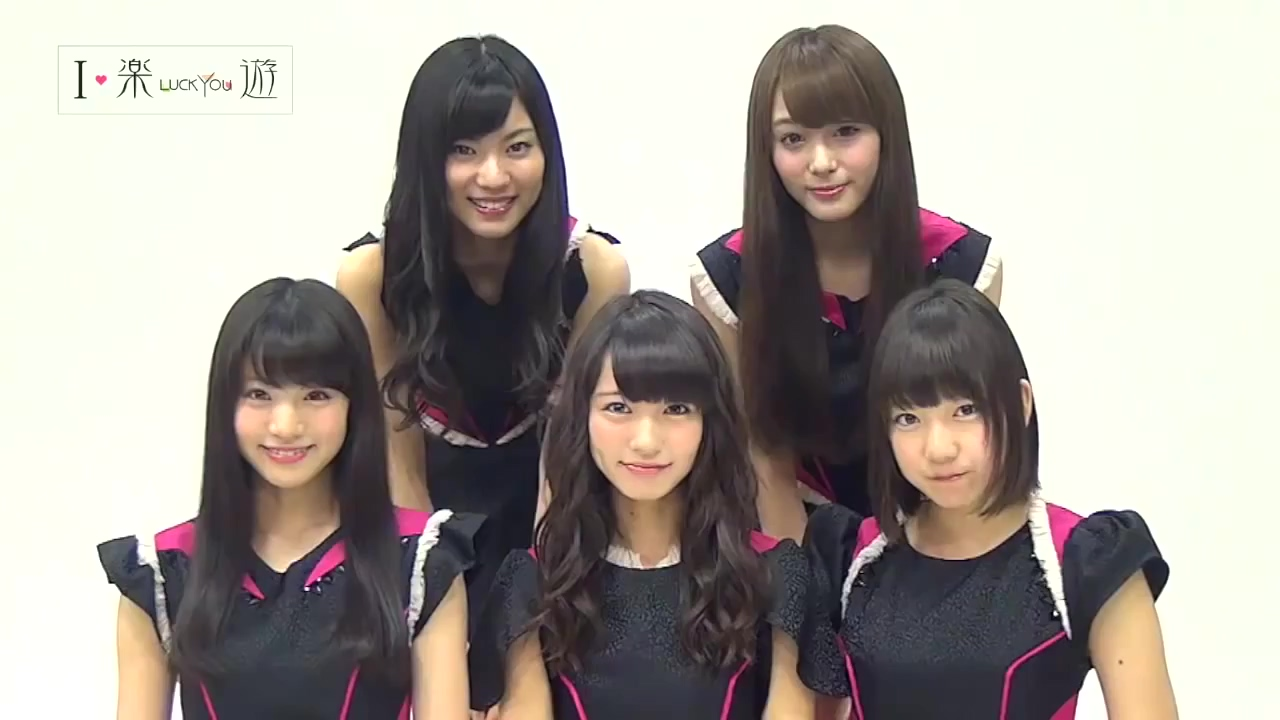
- Yumemiru Adolescence in 2015

Background information
- Origin: Japan
- Genres: J-pop
- Years active: 2012–present
- Members: Konoha Sakuraba; Yuno Sakurai; Nino Usagi; Riri Kusumoto; Rika Hisagi; Michiru Kawase
- Past members: see Yumemiru Adolescence#Past members
- Website: yumeado.jp

Yumeminutu Adolescence (夢みるアドレセンス), commonly abbreviated as YumeAdo (夢アド; sometimes stylized as YUMEADO), is a Japanese idol girl group. Their single "Maijene!" reached the fourth place on the weekly Oricon Singles Chart.

On February 3, 2021, their first sister group, YumeAdo Europe (stylized as YUMEADO EUROPE), was announced. The group made their "pre-debut" on February 27. Their official debut was on April 10, and their first single, "Here we go and go!/Shakin’&Movin’", was released on August 10. On March 31, 2023, it was announced that the current system would end with all members graduating on May 5, 2023. A new system was unveiled on July 10, 2023. The new system was revealed to be a soft reboot of the group, now called YumeAdo Elise (stylized as YUMEADO ELiSE). The group resumed activities on August 1, 2023.

A second sister group, composed of junior idols and produced in association with the fashion magazine Cuugal (キューーガル), YumeAdo Citron (stylized as YUMEADO CiTRON), was announced along with its members on July 9, 2021. They made their stage debut on the eve of the main group's 9th anniversary, on August 21.

A third sister group, composed of virtual YouTubers, YumeAdo Vanquish (ユメアドVanquish; often stylized as YUMEADO VANQUISH), was announced on August 21 as well. Their YouTube channel opened on November 8.

== Members ==
=== Yumemiru Adolescence ===
- Konoha Sakuraba (2025-current)
- Yuno Sakurai (2025-current)
- Nino Usagi (2025-current)
- Riri Kusumoto (2025-current)
- Rika Hisagi (2025-current)
- Michiru Kawase (2025-current)

==== Past members ====
- Misaki Oka (2012-2013)
- Akari Yamada (2012-2017)
- Kyōka (2012-2019)
- Karin Ogino (ex-leader; 2012-2019)
- Yuumi Shida (2012-2019)
- Rei Kobayashi (2012-2016; 2017-2019)
- Yuki Minase (2017-2019)
- Ayaka Tachibana (2020-2021)
- Akino Ishimori (2020-2021)
- Saya Yamashita (2017-2021)
- Hanon Yamaguchi (ex-leader, 2017-2021)
- Ranju Shirakawa (2019-2021)
- Karen Marikawa (2020-2021)
- Nanaha Sekine (2022-2023)
- Seira Hibiya (2020-2023)
- Mana Mogami (2022-2023)
- Yuna Seto (2023)
- Reina Adachi (2022-2023)
- Chihiro Sakurano (2022-2023)
- Remon Fujishiro (2022-2024)
- Saki Kudō (2023-2024)
- Yukino Funato (2023-2024)
- Juria Narumi (ex-leader, 2019-2024)
- Maaya Hiiragi (2022-2024)
- Wakana Mihara (2023-2024)
- Karin Fukatsu (2025)

=== YumeAdo Europe (2021-2023), YumeAdo Elise (2023-hiatus) ===
==== Members ====
- new members to be announced

==== Past members ====
- Honoka Minami (Roman Purple, 2021)
- Ayu Yamama (Swiss Red, 2021-2022)
- Himari Kiyonaga (British Green, 2021-2022)
- Chinatsu Shiraiwa (Lisbon Orange, 2021-2022)
- Nagisa Shiose (Monaco Blue, 2021-2022)
- Yukari Fukuda (French Pink, 2021-2022)
- Yui Miyamoto (Spanish Yellow, 2021-2023)
- Yukino Funato (Norwegian White, 2021-2023)
- Rin Kojima ( Italian Grape, 2021-2023)
- Juri Matsushima (Irish Green, 2022-2023)
- Ena Mizusawa (Swedish Blue, 2022-2023)
- Yuna Izumi (Dutch Orange, 2022-2023)
- Mirai Otsuka (White, 2023-2024)
- Riho Suzui (Yellow, 2023-2024)
- Ōka Konta (Pink, 2023-2024)

=== YumeAdo Citron ===
- Mio Kitajima (2021-current)
- Yuyu Nakai (2021-current)
- Nozawa Sae (2023-current)
- Mochizuki Riuru (2024-current)

==== Past members ====
- Rei Inagawa (2021-2023)
- Yuna Seto (2021-2023)
- Saki Kudō (2021-2023)
- Yui Kōzuki (2021-2023)
- Sena Onozaki (2023-2024)
- Karen Sasuga (2021-2025)

=== YumeAdo Vanquish ===
- Raise Aikawa (leader, 2021-current)
- Mirin Ichijo (2021-current)
- Neo Kagura (2021-current)
- Emiri Kuramoto (2021-current)

==== Past members ====
- Yoi Natsumori (2021-2024)
- Himari Miyazono (2021-2024)

== Discography ==
=== Yumemiru Adolescence ===
==== Studio albums ====
Title	Release date	Oricon
Daiichi Shishunki.	November 26, 2014	196
SEVEN STAR	March 13, 2019	16
SUPER JET SUPER	September 30, 2020	48

==== Mini-albums ====
Title	Release date	Oricon
Nakimushi Sniper→	May 28, 2013	30
Junjō Marionette	November 26, 2013	26

==== Compilation albums ====
Title	Release date	Oricon
5	March 22, 2017	17

==== Singles ====
Title	Release date	Oricon
"Hajimete no Kagayaki"	August 27, 2012	—
"Yumemiru Taiyō/Adolescence"	January 20, 2013	—
"Mawaru Sekai"	April 22, 2014	10
"Shōmei Teenager"	September 9, 2014	5
"Bye Bye My Days"	March 18, 2015	7
"Summer Nude Adolescence"	July 15, 2015	7
"Mai Gene!"	January 20, 2016	4
"Oshiete Schrödinger/Fantastic Parade"	April 27, 2016	8
"Love for You"	July 27, 2016	10
"Otona Yarasete yo "	November 23, 2016	13
"Koi no Effect Magic"	January 18, 2017	12
"Idol Race"	January 18, 2017	11
"Lalalala Life"	July 19, 2017	12
"20xx/Exceeeed!!"	November 15, 2017	8
"Sakura"	March 14, 2018	14
"Melon Soda"	July 25, 2018	12
"START DAY"	May 19, 2021	22
"Accelerator/Natsu ga Kitaze!!"	November 22, 2022	16

==== Video works ====
Title	Release date	Oricon
Yumemiru Adolescence kagayake! Yume Ad Award 2014	March 25, 2015	(DVD+CD) / - (Blu-ray+CD) / - (DVD) / 157 (Blu-ray)
＃ Yumetomo no wa Tour 2015 haru at Nakanosanpuraza	August 12, 2015	287 (DVD+CD) / 85 (Blu-ray+CD)
＃ Yumetomo no wa Tour 2015 Aki	March 23, 2016	243 (DVD) / 133 (Blu-ray)
Yumemiru Adolescence One Man LIVE 2019	April 22, 2020	(Blu-ray)

=== YumeAdo Europe/YumeAdo Elise ===
==== Singles ====
Title	Release date	Oricon
"Here we go and go!/Shakin’&Movin’"	August 10, 2021	8
"Watashi no Kimochi/Yume/Utsutsu Borderless"	September 20, 2022	18

== Filmography ==
=== Yumemiru Adolescence ===
==== Films ====
Year	Title	Role	Network	Notes
2016	Kin Medal Otoko	high school students	Drama / Comedy Movie	
2017	SUPER Horrifying Story 2	Miwa, Kasumi, Natsume, Arisa	Omnibus Horror Movie	Karin Ogino, Yuumi Shida, Kyōka, Akari Yamada

==== Television ====
Year	Title	Role	Network	Notes
2010-2012	Shimajirō Hesoka	Rika, Saya and Hina Sanjo	TSC	Karin Ogino, Yuumi Shida, Kyōka. Only appeared on the "Oshiete! 3 Shimai" segment.
2014-2016	YUMELIVE!	Herself / Host	Pigoo Live	Regular performances at AKIBA Cultures' Theater
2015–2016	Yumemiru Adolescence Good Variety! "YUMETV!"	Herself / Host	Kawaiian TV	Japanese variety show, 20 episodes
2015	Doki Doki Japan!!	Herself / Host	Channel 9	Thai variety show, 23 episodes
2015	Minami-kun no Koibito ～my little lover	Herself	Fuji TV	Cameo on 1st and last episodes

==== Website ====
Year	Title	Role	Network	Notes
2014-2016	YumeAdo to Yumemi ma Showroom	Herself/ MC	Showroom Live	Regular performances delivered every Mondays at 19:00.

==== Radio ====
Year	Title	Role	Network	Notes
2012	Itsu Yaru no? Ima Desho!	Herself/ Host	Shimokita FM	3 people appear for episode
2015	Itano Tomano no Uta Onna 〜Girl's Music Channel〜	Herself/ Co-Host	TFM	Akari Yamada (all times), Karin Ogino and Yuumi Shida, 2 episodes each one.
2020-2022	YumeAdo no. na〇〇	Herself	Shibuya Cross FM	

=== YumeAdo Europe/YumeAdo Elise ===
==== Television ====
Year	Title	Role	Network	Notes
2021	Shimada Shacho Kohei no Mangu Dōdeshou?	Herself	Gunma TV	Yui Miyamoto, Nagisa Shiose appear for 2 episodes
2021	Mirai-kei Idol TV	Herself	Tokyo MX	May 27, July 15, July 22
2021	Kannai Devil	Herself	Television Kanagawa	Yui Miyamoto, Yukari Fukuda, Yukino Funato appear for episode
2022	13-bu no Stage	Herself	Television Kanagawa	May 12, September 15

==== Website ====
Year	Title	Role	Network	Notes
2021	Yaguchi Mari no Kayō THE NIGHT	Herself	AbemaTV	Ayu Yamama, Yui Miyamoto (April 7) Yukari Fukuda, Nagisa Shiose (August 11)

==== Radio ====
Year	Title	Role	Network	Notes
2021	Rock field 897	Herself	InterFM	Ayu Yamama, Yukari Fukuda, Yui Miyamoto, Yukino Funato (April 12) Himari Kiyonaga, Honoka Minami, Nagisa Shiose, Chinatsu Shiraiwa (April 19) Yui Miyamoto, Yukino Funato, Nagisa Shiose, Rin Kojima (January 10, 2022) Rin Kojima, Yukino Funato, Juri Matsushima (September 5, 2022) Rin Kojima, Yui Miyamoto, Yukari Fukuda (September 12, 2022)
2022	YumeAdo no. na〇〇	Herself	Shibuya Cross FM	Rin Kojima, Nagisa Shiose, Yukari Fukuda
