= Rugby sevens at the 2019 SEA Games – Women's tournament =

Rugby Sevens – Women's tournament at the 2019 SEA Games
- Venue: Clark Parade Grounds
- Dates: 7–8 December 2019
- Nations: 6

The women's rugby sevens tournament at the 2019 Southeast Asian Games were held from 7 to 8 December 2019 in the Philippines. 6 Southeast Asian teams played in the women's competition.

All matches were played at the Clark Parade Grounds in Angeles City.

== Competition schedule ==
| G | Group stage | PO | 5th place play-off | B | 3rd place play-off | F | Final |

| Sat 7 | Sun 8 | | | |
|---|---|---|---|---|
| G | G | PO | B | F |

Source: 2019 SEA Games Official Calendar

== Participating nations ==
The following six teams participated for the women's competition.

- Laos (LAO)
- Indonesia (INA)
- Malaysia (MAS)
- Philippines (PHI)
- Singapore (SGP)
- Thailand (THA)

== Results ==
- All times are Philippine Standard Time (UTC+8).

=== Group stage ===
| Pos | Team | Pld | W | D | L | PF | PA | PD | Pts | Final Result |
|---|---|---|---|---|---|---|---|---|---|---|
| 1 | Thailand | 5 | 5 | 0 | 0 | 186 | 12 | +174 | 15 | Advanced to Gold medal match |
| 2 | Philippines (H) | 5 | 4 | 0 | 1 | 103 | 55 | +48 | 13 | Advanced to Gold medal match |
| 3 | Malaysia | 5 | 3 | 0 | 2 | 102 | 79 | +23 | 11 | Advanced to Bronze medal match |
| 4 | Indonesia | 5 | 2 | 0 | 3 | 56 | 113 | −57 | 9 | Advanced to Bronze medal match |
| 5 | Singapore | 5 | 1 | 0 | 4 | 63 | 82 | −19 | 7 | Advanced to 5th place playoff match |
| 6 | Laos | 5 | 0 | 0 | 5 | 0 | 169 | −169 | 5 | Advanced to 5th place playoff match |

Source: 2019 SEA Games Official Calendar
(H) Hosts

7 December 2019
09:00

| Malaysia | 5–31 | Philippines |
| | Report |

Clark Parade Grounds, Angeles City

7 December 2019
09:20

| Singapore | 27–0 | Laos |
| | Report |

Clark Parade Grounds, Angeles City

7 December 2019
09:40

| Indonesia | 0–38 | Thailand |
| | Report |

Clark Parade Grounds, Angeles City

7 December 2019
11:40

| Singapore | 12–19 | Malaysia |
| | Report |

Clark Parade Grounds, Angeles City

7 December 2019
12:00

| Indonesia | 5–24 | Philippines |
| | Report |

Clark Parade Grounds, Angeles City

7 December 2019
12:20

| Thailand | 52–0 | Laos |
| | Report |

Clark Parade Grounds, Angeles City

7 December 2019
14:20

| Indonesia | 22–12 | Singapore |
| | Report |

Clark Parade Grounds, Angeles City

7 December 2019
14:40

| Laos | 0–39 | Malaysia |
| | Report |

Clark Parade Grounds, Angeles City

7 December 2019
15:00

| Philippines | 7–38 | Thailand |
| | Report |

Clark Parade Grounds, Angeles City

8 December 2019
09:00

| Thailand | 31–0 | Malaysia |
| | Report |

Clark Parade Grounds, Angeles City

8 December 2019
09:20

| Laos | 0–24 | Indonesia |
| | Report |

Clark Parade Grounds, Angeles City

8 December 2019
09:40

| Philippines | 14–7 | Singapore |
| | Report |

Clark Parade Grounds, Angeles City

8 December 2019
11:40

| Malaysia | 39–5 | Indonesia |
| | Report |

Clark Parade Grounds, Angeles City

8 December 2019
12:00

| Singapore | 5–27 | Thailand |
| | Report |

Clark Parade Grounds, Angeles City

8 December 2019
12:20

| Philippines | 27–0 | Laos |
| | Report |

Clark Parade Grounds, Angeles City

=== Final round ===
5th place playoff

8 December 2019
15:00

| Singapore | 43–0 | Laos |
| | Report |

Clark Parade Grounds, Angeles City

Bronze medal match

8 December 2019
15:40

| Malaysia | 19–12 | Indonesia |
| | Report |

Clark Parade Grounds, Angeles City

Gold medal match

8 December 2019
16:20

| Thailand | 17–7 | Philippines |
| | Report |

Clark Parade Grounds, Angeles City

== See also ==
- Men's tournament
