= Izumi Kitta =

Japanese voice actress (born 1984)

- 橘田 いずみ
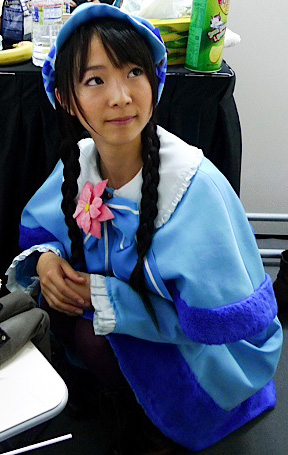
- Kitta in 2010
- Born: November 27, 1984 (age 41); Tokyo, Japan
- Other name: Manami Nanto (南斗愛美)
- Occupation: Voice actress
- Years active: 2008–present
- Agent: Hibiki Cast
- Notable work: Tantei Opera Milky Holmes as Cordelia Glauca

Izumi Kitta (橘田 いずみ, Kitta Izumi; born November 27, 1984) is a Japanese voice actress best known as the voice of Cordelia Glauca in the media franchise Tantei Opera Milky Holmes, the voice of Tomoko Kuroki in No Matter How I Look at It, It's You Guys' Fault I'm Not Popular!, and the voice of Rainbow Dash in the Japanese dub of My Little Pony: Friendship Is Magic. Her first maxi single, "Colorful Garden", was released on April 6, 2011. Kitta attended Dwango Creative School, a voice actor training school in 2007. After leaving Dwango Artist Production, she is now affiliated with Hibiki Cast. In 2017, she published her first manga, Liberty (Note: リバティ, Ribati), in yuri magazine Galette, illustrated by Moto Momono.

On November 27, 2021, Kitta announced on her LINE blog that she had married an Italian whom she had met while studying in London.

On her Instagram, she announced that she has one child who was born on November 1, 2024.

== Filmography ==
=== Anime ===
List of voice performances in anime
Year	Series	Role	Notes	Source
2001	Angel Tales	Ayumi (Turtle)		
2008	Onegai My Melody Kirara Tsu	Natalie		
2008	Slayers Revolution	Villagers, Female customers, children		
2008	Hell Girl: Three Vessels	Nozomi Bitou		
2008	Hakushaku to Yōsei	Banshee's voice (ep 4); Maid (eps 8, 12)		
2009	Slayers Evolution-R	Villagers, Townspeople, Taforashia people		
2009	Jewelpet	Ryoko Azabu		
2009	Weiß Survive	Michi		
2009	Aoi Hana	Waitress, Clerk, Staff		
2009	A Certain Scientific Railgun	Various episodic characters		
2009	Weiß Survive R	Michi		
2010	B Gata H Kei	Aoi Katase		
2010–15	Tantei Opera Milky Holmes series	Cordelia Glauca	Lead role	
2011	Freezing	Creo Brand		
2011–14	Cardfight!! Vanguard series	Misaki Tokura	Lead role	
2011	Dragon Crisis!	Mao Aikawa		
2012	Brave 10	Benmaru, Rokuro Mochizuki		
2012	Shiba Inuko-san	Schoolgirl		
2012	Shining Hearts: Shiawase no Pan	Queen		
2012	Wooser's Hand-to-Mouth Life	Cordelia Glauca		
2012	World War Blue	Zarufa Opal		
2013	Love Live!	Student council		
2013	Devil Survivor 2: The Animation	Poltergeist, Ririmu, Sarasuvuati		
2013	No Matter How I Look at It, It's You Guys' Fault I'm Not Popular!	Tomoko Kuroki	Lead role	
2013	Freezing Vibration	Jina Purpleton		
2013	Tokyo Ravens	Suzu Saotome		
2013	Neppu Kairiku Bushi Road	Hana		
2014	Recently, My Sister Is Unusual	Minami-sensei		
2014–15	Future Card Buddyfight series	Noboru Kodo		
2014	Engaged to the Unidentified	Schoolgirl		
2014	Robot Girls Z	Miyari		
2014	Gigant Big-Shot Tsukasa	Manabu Numata	Lead role	
2014	Maido! Urayasu Tekkin Kazoku	Sakura Osawagi		
2014	Cardfight!! Vanguard: The Movie	Misaki Tokura	Lead role, feature film	
2015	Rin-ne	Bijin hisho		
2015	Triage X	Yuu Momokino		
2015	Chivalry of a Failed Knight	Yuri Oriki		
2015	PriPara	Tina		
2016	Luck & Logic	Nemesis		
2016	Onigiri	Kaguya		
2017	BanG Dream!	Rii Uzawa		
2024	Shy Season 2	Kwabara		
2024	Cardfight!! Vanguard DivineZ 2nd Season	Senka Kanae		

=== Video games ===
List of voice performances in video games
Year	Series	Role	Notes	Source
2010	Memories Off: Yubikiri no Kioku	Izumi Yamagishi	Xbox 360	
2010	Shining Hearts	Queen	PSP	
2010–15	Tantei Opera Milky Holmes series	Cordelia Glauca		
2011	Tsukumonogatari	Izusama	PSP	
2011	Disgaea 4	Uchibito, Byoin	PS3	
2011	Bunmei Kaika Aoiza Ibunroku	Yui Aragane	PSP	
2012	Shining Blade	Cerberus	PSP	
2012	Duke Nukem Forever	Chastity		
2012	Renai Replay	Yakumo Shino	phone app	
2014	Motto! SoniComi	Anji Guravuite	PS3	
2014	Cardfight!! Vanguard: Lock on victory	Misaki Tokura	DS	
2015	Future Card Buddyfight: Explosive Fight of Friendship!	Noboru Kodo	DS	

=== Overseas dubs ===
List of voice performances in overseas dubs
Series	Role	Notes	Source
Lego Friends	Mia Shining		
My Little Pony: Equestria Girls	Rainbow Dash		
My Little Pony: Equestria Girls – Rainbow Rocks	Rainbow Dash		
My Little Pony: Equestria Girls – Friendship Games	Rainbow Dash		
My Little Pony: Equestria Girls – Legend of Everfree	Rainbow Dash		
My Little Pony: Equestria Girls (2017 television specials)	Rainbow Dash		
My Little Pony: Equestria Girls (web series)	Rainbow Dash		
My Little Pony: Friendship is Magic	Rainbow Dash		
The Moshlings Movie	Jeepers		

== Bibliography ==
- Liberty (2017 – ongoing)
