= Weiß Survive =

Japanese anime television series

- Created by: Bushiroad
- Manga
- Written by: Takuya Fujima
- Published by: Bushiroad
- Magazine: Bushiroad TCG Magazine
- Volumes: 1
- Anime television series
- Directed by: Iku Suzuki
- Produced by: Tomoyo Inoue
- Written by: Takao Yoshioka
- Studio: Studio Hibari
- Original network: TBS
- Original run: June 5, 2009 – September 18, 2009
- Episodes: 16
- Anime television series

Weiß Survive R
- Directed by: Kenji Seto
- Produced by: Tomoyo Inoue
- Studio: Studio Hibari
- Original network: TBS
- Original run: December 4, 2009 – March 26, 2010
- Episodes: 12
- Manga

Weiß Survive R
- Written by: Nagi Kazekawa
- Published by: Kadokawa Shoten
- Magazine: Comp Ace
- Original run: 2010 – ?
- Volumes: 1

Weiß Survive (ヴァイス・サヴァイヴ, Vaisu Savaivu) is a card battle manga and anime created by Bushiroad. The manga was drawn by Takuya Fujima and was serialized in Bushiroad's Bushiroad TCG Magazine. A 16-episode anime television series aired between June 5, 2009, and September 18, 2009, as a short segment on the live action television series Card Gakuen. A 12-episode sequel titled Weiß Survive R aired between December 4, 2009, and March 26, 2010, also on Card Gakuen. A manga adaptation of Weiß Survive R was serialized in Kadokawa Shoten's Comp Ace. It was collected in a single tankōbon volume, released on October 26, 2010.

The series introduced the collectible card game Weiß Schwarz.

== Characters ==
Takeshi (タケシ, Takeshi)
Voiced by: Nobuhisa Nakamoto
Michi (ミチ, Michi)
Voiced by: Izumi Kitta
Versus Ji-san (バーサスじいさん, Bāsesu Jī-san)
Voiced by: Noboru Maeda
Shizuru (しずる, Shizuru)
Voiced by: Atsuko Enomoto
Sies (シス, Shisu)
Voiced by: Jun Miruno
Operetta (オペレッタ, Operetta)
Voiced by: Kotomi Harunatsu
Cal (キャル, Kyaru)
Voiced by: Yoshino Nanjō
Ku (クゥ, Kū)
Voiced by: Yuto Suzuki
Joe (丞, Jō)
Voiced by: Kazuma Horie

== Episodes ==
| No. | Title | Original release date |
|---|---|---|
| 1 | "A Heart Throbbing Card Game!" "Kādo Gēmu ni Mune Kyun!" (カードゲームに胸きゅん！) | June 5, 2009 |
Takeshi and Michi stay overnight at their school to study, where Takeshi picks up a card and Michi tells him that it comes from a game called Weiß Schwarz and that she has won many tournaments involving that game. Michi ends up getting sucked into a portal.
| 2 | "A Heart Throbbing Experience and an Old Man from Nowhere?" "Dokozo no Ji Jī to Mune Kyun?" (どこぞのジジイと胸きゅん？) | June 12, 2009 |
Takeshi enters the portal that Michi was sucked in and encounters the VS Ji-san. The VS Ji-san tells him he is in the Weiß Schwarz battle space and that he is the chosen warrior. Suddenly, a giant card battlefield appears with Michi standing on the other side, and Takeshi is told that in order for him and Michi to leave, he must become stronger by playing the game.
| 3 | "A Heart Throbbing First Experience <3" "Sho Taiken ni Mune Kyun <3" (初体験に胸きゅん♡) | June 19, 2009 |
Takeshi is given a deck to use against Michi, which VS Ji-san calls the "Great Galaxy Deck", or "GG Deck" for short. Takeshi ends up losing.
| 4 | "A Heart Throbbing Torture and Battle *" "Chōkyō to Batoru ni Mune Kyun *" (調教とバトルに胸キュン☆) | June 26, 2009 |
Takeshi continues his training, but still ends up losing every time.
| 5 | "Moe x 3 is (´d`;) Haha" "Moe x 3 de (´d`;) Hāhā" (萌x3で（´д`；）ハアハア) | July 3, 2009 |
Takeshi, Michi and the VS Ji-san encounter new opponents.
| 6 | "Burning Kick is (;´D`) Haha" "Moeru Ashige ni (;´D`) Hāhā" (萌える足蹴に（；´Д`）ハアハア) | July 10, 2009 |
Takeshi fights the three chaos sisters - Sies, Operetta and Cal. Takeshi manages to use a kick to peep under their clothing.
| 7 | "A Captivating Boing (*´d`*) Haha" "Miwaku no Boin da (*´d`*) Hāhā" (魅惑のボインだ（＊´д`＊）ハアハア) | July 17, 2009 |
Takeshi is down to level 3, but uses three cards to attack the girls. One of them contains Yu Narukami from Persona 4.
| 8 | "Here -(°∀°)-!!" "Kita -(°∀°)-!!" (キタ－（°∀°）－！！) | July 24, 2009 |
The three chaos sisters are finally defeated.
| 9 | "†Welcome! Alice x Cross †" "†Yōkoso! Arisu x Kurosu †" (†ようこそ！アリスxクロス†) | July 31, 2009 |
Two new opponents appear in the third door, but they won't fight if there are girls around.
| 10 | "†Figure and Aris†" "†Figyua to Arisu†" (†フィギュアとアリス†) | August 7, 2009 |
Joe starts by summoning a weird monster, but the fight is interrupted when Michi leaves Takashi's pocket.
| 11 | "†Metamorphose of Aris†" "†Metamorufōze no Arisu†" (†メタモルフォーゼのアリス†) | August 14, 2009 |
The fight between Takashi and Joe continues.
| 12 | "†Encore and Aris†" "†Ankōru to Arisu†" (†アンコールとアリス†) | August 28, 2009 |
Coud takes over the fight, but is defeated.
| 13 | "Showdown!" "Kessen!" (i決戦！) | September 4, 2009 |
Takashi prepares for battle against Michi, his final opponent.
| 14 | "Clash!" "Gekitotsu!" (激突！) | September 11, 2009 |
The fight begins, but Takashi refuses to give up.
| 15 | "Confession!" "Kokuhaku!" (告白！) | September 18, 2009 |
Takashi promises to take Michi back with him if he wins and uses Climatic Countdown.
| 16 | "Return!" "Kikan!" (帰還！) | September 25, 2009 |
Takashi and Michi are sent back to their own world, but Michi does not remember anything that happened there.
