= Hei no Naka no Biyōshitsu =

Japanese manga

- Volume cover

塀の中の美容室
- Manga
- Written by: Mina Sakurai
- Illustrated by: Marco Kohinata
- Published by: Shogakukan
- Magazine: Big Comic
- Original run: March 25, 2020 – May 9, 2020
- Volumes: 1
- icon

Hei no Naka no Biyōshitsu (塀の中の美容室; lit. 'Beauty Salon in Prison'), also known as The Depth of the Sky, is a Japanese manga series written by Mina Sakurai and illustrated by Marco Kohinata. It is based on Sakurai's novel of the same title, published in 2018. The manga was serialized in Shogakukan's seinen manga magazine Big Comic from March to May 2020, with its chapters collected in a single tankōbon volumes.

== Publication ==
Written by Mina Sakurai and illustrated by Marco Kohinata, Hei no Naka no Biyōshitsu is based on Sakurai's novel Hei no Naka no Biyōshitsu, published by Futabasha on September 13, 2018. The series ran in Shogakukan's seinen manga magazine Big Comic from March 25 to May 9, 2020. Shogakukan collected its five chapters in a single tankōbon volume, released on August 28, 2020.

== Reception ==
Hei no Naka no Biyōshitsu received an Excellence Award at the 24th Japan Media Arts Festival in 2021.
