= List of Jewelpet characters =

This is a list of characters appearing in the anime Jewelpet.

== Main characters ==
Rinko Kougyoku (紅玉 りんこ, Kōgyoku Rinko)
Voiced by: Eri Kamei

Rinko is a 14-year-old junior high school student from Takaragaseki. She is somewhat shy with acrophobia and does not excel at school, but has a strong sense of justice. Rinko her friends are chosen by the Four Great Magicians of Jewel Land to gather the lost Jewelpets and return them to Jewel Land before disaster strikes both worlds. She uses two Magical Items: the Jewel Pocketbook to awaken Jewelpets from their Jewel State along with Ruby, and Jewel Stick, which she uses to cast magic.

Minami Asaoka (朝岡 みなみ, Asaoka Minami)
Voiced by: Akina

Minami Asaoka is Rinko's childhood friend and Garnet's human partner. She is a member of the school's kendo club whose family owns an Okonomiyaki shop in the city suburbs. Normally being a tomboy, Minami finds feminine things embarrassing and tries to keep a secret.

Aoi Arisugawa (有栖川 あおい, Arisugawa Aoi)
Voiced by: Miyuki Sawashiro

Aoi Arisugawa is the daughter of the school principal and Sapphie's human partner. She is member of the influential family who owns Arisugawa Zaibatsu, and has been taken care of by her trusted butler Genshirou in her mansion when her parents were away. Aoi is calm and gentle, but does not have any true friends due to her status. Rinko sees how lonely she is and wants to be friends with her, and succeeds in it after a few misunderstandings and awakening Sapphie.

== Supporting characters ==
Keigo Tatewaki (帯刀 啓吾, Tatewaki Keigo)
Voiced by: Mamoru Miyano
Keigo Tatewaki is a secretary from the Prime Minister of Japan who knows about the Jewelpet's existence in secrecy, as well as Flora's human partner.
Akira Nanase (七瀬 晃, Nanase Akira)
Voiced by: Yuki Kaida
Nephrite's human partner and Rinko's neighbor, Akira is part of a basketball team in New York City, USA. He can speak English and sometimes shows off in front of Rinko. His father is a photographer and is often away on work, leaving him in charge of the housework.
Genshirō Hattori (服部 玄士郎, Hattori Genshirō)
Voiced by: Binbin Takaoka
Hattori is the head butler of Arisugawa Mansion and King's human partner. An expert in martial arts, he has been serving the Arisugawa family for 70 years and protects Aoi with his life.
Sayuri Kōgyoku (紅玉 小百合, Kōgyoku Sayuri) and Mitsuo Kōgyoku (紅玉 光夫, Kōgyoku Mitsuo)
Voiced by: Yuki Kaida (Sayuri), Hidenobu Kiuchi (Mitsuo)
Sayuri and Matsuo Rinko's parents as well as Rald's human partners. They used to go to the cinema until one of Diana's curse almost made their relationship fall apart. After nearly going through a divorce, they awakened Rald which they consider part of the family.
Ryōko Azabu (麻布 涼子, Azabu Ryōko)
Voiced by: Izumi Kitta
Ryōko is one of Aoi's Entourages as well as Prase' caretaker in the Human World. She initially disliked Rinko and Minami, but warms up to them slightly after they help her solve her problem with her younger sister, Misaki. Ryōko is also a member of the school's Radio Club.
Megumi Hirō (広尾 恵, Hirō Megumi)
Voiced by: Nanako Inoue
Megumi is Ryl's human partner and caretaker as well as one of Aoi's Entourages. A big eater, Diana curses her into seeing herself as a pig whenever Megumi looked in the mirror.
Hisashi Miyamoto (宮本 久志, Miyamoto Hisashi)
Voiced by: Takuya Desaki
Miyamoto is Chite's human partner and Minami's love interest. He is the captain of the school's Kendo Club and often practices with her despite being unable to swim. Miyamoto is sometimes dim-witted to the point of making Garnet angry to him.
Kuranosuke Hinata (日向 蔵之輔, Hinata Kuranosuke)
Voiced by: Nobuhiko Okamoto
One of Rinko's classmates, Hinata is Titana's human partner who is member of the basketball club. She is a close friend of Akira before he moved to New York to study overseas.

== Other characters ==
- Naoto Sakuragi (桜木 ナオト, Sakuragi Naoto) (voiced by Masataka Azuma) is Aqua's human partner and a high school student working on a part-time job in conveyor-belt sushi shop.
- Misaki Azabu (麻布 美咲, Azabu Misaki) (voiced by Erina Nakayama) is Ryoko's younger sister and Prase' original Human Partner.
- Raako Menma (麺間 ラー子, Menma Rāko) (voiced by Mizuki Takahara) is Rin's human partner and one of Rinko's classmates, Raako owns a family-run Ramen Shop on which she helps out. Her mother died a long time ago, leaving her father to manage the shop.
- Lyrica Himeno (姫野 リリカ, Himeno Ririka) (voiced by Mariya Ise): Sango's human partner, Lyrica is the heir of the Himeno Zaibatsu and Aoi's rival in wealth. Somewhat posh and high-headed, she always boasts her wealth and sometimes surrounded with people.
- Yujiro Asaoka (朝岡 裕次郎, Asaoka Yūjirō) (voiced by Shigemi Tanaka) is Minami's father who owns the Okonomiyaki restaurant in downtown Takaragaseki.
- Tetsuya Asaoka (朝岡 哲也, Asaoka Tetsuya) and Hiroshi Asaoka (朝岡 ひろし, Asaoka Hiroshi) (voiced by Momoko Ohara) are Minami's younger twin brothers and Tour's human partners, they sometimes tend to have disagreements despite their similar personalities.
- Prime Minister (総理, Sōri) (voiced by Tetsuji Ōta): The Prime Minister of Japan and Tatewaki's boss, he is working with the magicians of Jewel Land to make sure the secrets of the Jewelpets are kept safe from the general public.
- Menkan (麺間) (voiced by Ryōta Akazawa) is Raako's father who owns the ramen shop.
- Mitchi (ミッチー, Mitchī) (voiced by Yasuaki Takumi) is Peridot's human partner who is enthusiastic about his job and believes in the power of dreams. Diana cursed him and he lost all of his passion and drive. An impassioned speech by Rinko snaps him out of it, awakening Peridot. He then got the role of Princess after Peridot purified him and formed the Takaragaseki Opera Group.
- Yone Tatewaki (帯刀 ヨネ, Tatewaki Yone) (voiced by Mariko Nagahama) is Keigo's grandmother who married 999 couples. She wanted Chie and Keigo to be married.
- Chie (チエ) (voiced by Marie Yamada) is Keigo's childhood friend and Milky's human partner.
- Ken (ケン) (voiced by Takuya Tachibana) is Keigo's cousin.
- Hanako Kabeno (壁野 花子, Kabeno Hanako) (voiced by Satomi Hanamura) is Luna's human partner who exchanges letters with a famous model Arato. She is nervous about seeing him in person, thinking her appearance will disgust him.
- Arato (voiced by Yoshimasa Hosoya) is Hanako's penpal and also a famous model working in Paris.

== Jewel Land ==
- Raku Majo (ラクマージョ, Raku Mājo) (voiced by Nanako Inoue) is the leader of the Four Great Magicians and ruler of Jewel Land. She is the one who gives Rinko and Ruby some advice on how to find the Jewelpets as well as the one who gives info to the Prime Minister about the Jewelpet's existence in secret, until the secret was exposed to the world. Raku Majo also has an ability to create a Jewelpet through a special altar using her magic.
- Ki Majo (キマージョ, Ki Mājo) (voiced by Mariko Nagahama) is the first of the Four Great Magicians who represents happiness and joy.
- Do Majo (ドマージョ, Do Mājo) (voiced by Junko Minagawa) is the second of the Four Great Magicians whi represents anger and rage.
- Ai Majo (アイマージョ, Ai Majō) (voiced by Yuki Kaida) is the third of the Four Great Magicians who represents sadness and pity.
- Halite (ハーライト, Hāraito) (voiced by Mika Ishibashi) is the homeroom teacher of Ruby's Class in Jewel Land. She is an expert magician who teaches the Jewelpets how to use their magic successfully.
- Sulfur (サルファー, Sarufā) (voiced by Atsushi Kousaka) is one of the male teachers of Jewel Land and Tour's partner. He is a supportive teacher to all the Jewelpets.
- Moldavite (モルダヴァイト, Morudavaito) (voiced by Hiroshi Shimozaki) is the jolly Headmaster of the Magic Academy where the Jewelpets attend to learn about magic. He is also Rin's partner in Jewelpet Twinkle and has a close relation with Jewelina.

== Antagonists ==
- Mint (ミント, Minto) (Junko Takeuchi) is the 30-year-old leader of The Phantom Herb Thieves (怪盗ハーブ団, Kaitō hābu-dan), a group of thieves employed under Diana whose goal is to steal Jewel Charms. She is prideful and loyal on her code to serve Diana.
- Sage (セージ, Sēji) (voiced by Hidenobu Kiuchi): The male member of The Phantom Herb Thieves, Sage is the sympathetic member of the group.
- Aojisho (アオジソ, Aojiso) (voiced by Akiko Kobayashi): The third member of The Phantom Herb Thieves and Kohaku's human partner, Aojisho is the dimwitted member of the group. She is usually not smart and always thinks about food.
