= Akari Yamada =

Japanese model and actress

- 山田 朱莉
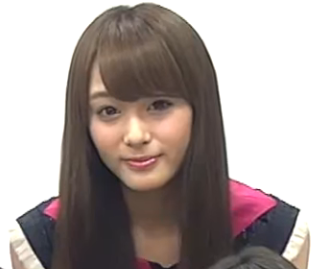
- Born: May 25, 1996 (age 29); Osaka Prefecture, Japan
- Other names: Akarin (あかりん)
- Occupations: Model; actress; idol
- Years active: 2009–
- Style: Fashion
- Height: 168 cm (5 ft 6 in)

Akari Yamada (山田 朱莉, Yamada Akari; born 25 May 1996, in Osaka Prefecture) is a Japanese fashion model, actress, and model. She is represented with Tambourine Artists.

== Biography ==
In 2009, Yamada won the grand prize at the 17th "Pichimo Audition" from the fashion magazine Pichi Lemon (Gakken Publishing), and later in the same year she became a Pichi Lemon exclusive model.

She appeared in the 2010 FIVB Volleyball Men's World Championship's "Sekai Volleyball Ōen Fashion-bu".

In June 2012, Yamada became a member of the idol music group Yumemiru Adolescence.

She graduated from Pichi Lemon from its April 2013 issue.

On 6 January 2017, "because a serious violation of the rules of the group activities was recognized" it was announced that Yamada took self-control over all activities for the time being, she later expressed her apology on her blog two days later.

Later in 31 March, on her blog she announced that she graduated from Yumemiru Adolescence.

== Personal life ==
After graduating from Pichi Lemon, she was browsing and seemed to be mature, but she prefer a cute system appearance, so she long for other members who are short of her.

Yamada said that she inherited the character of her mother and grandmother.

== Filmography ==
=== Films ===
Year	Title	Role
2015	Eyes	Naho Matsubara
2017	SUPER Horrifying Story 2	Arisa

=== Television ===
Year	Title	Network
2009	Tambourine Mania TV	Enta! 371
2010	Suiensaa	NHK E
2010	Piramekino TV	TV Tokyo
2012	Jōshiki kuru tto Henkan Show: Masakame TV	NHK E

=== Theatre ===
Year	Title	Role
2014	Masshirona zumen to taimu mashin	Kajiyama Rei-yaku

=== Anime ===
Year	Title	Network
2010	Ichigoichie: Kiminokotoba	Kids Station

=== Advertisements ===
Year	Title
2013	Nissan Drama in Drama Yamada-kun and the Seven Witches Season 4

=== Events ===
Year	Title
2009	Tambourine Summer Fes 2009
2009	Aki wa Bunkamatsuri TM05 Kotoshi no Theme wa –Natsu no Wasuremono–
2010	Tambourine Mania 009 Ato wa Yūki dakeda!

=== Internet ===
Year	Title	Website
2011	Boo Boo Kids	TBS

== Bibliography ==
=== Magazines ===
Year	Title	No.	Publisher	Ref.
	Pichi Lemon	Jun 2009–Apr 2013	Gakken Publishing	
2014	Weekly Young Jump	52	Shueisha	

=== Photo albums ===
Year	Title	Publisher	Notes	Code
2013	AkaYuu Style	Taiyō Tosho	Co-starred with Yuumi Shida	ISBN 978-4813082064

=== Mook ===
Year	Title	Publisher	Code
2012	Uchira no Audition Monogatari	Gakken Publishing	ISBN 978-4-05-203547-0
