= Clark Parade Grounds =

Sports ground in Pampanga, Philippines

- CDC Parade Grounds
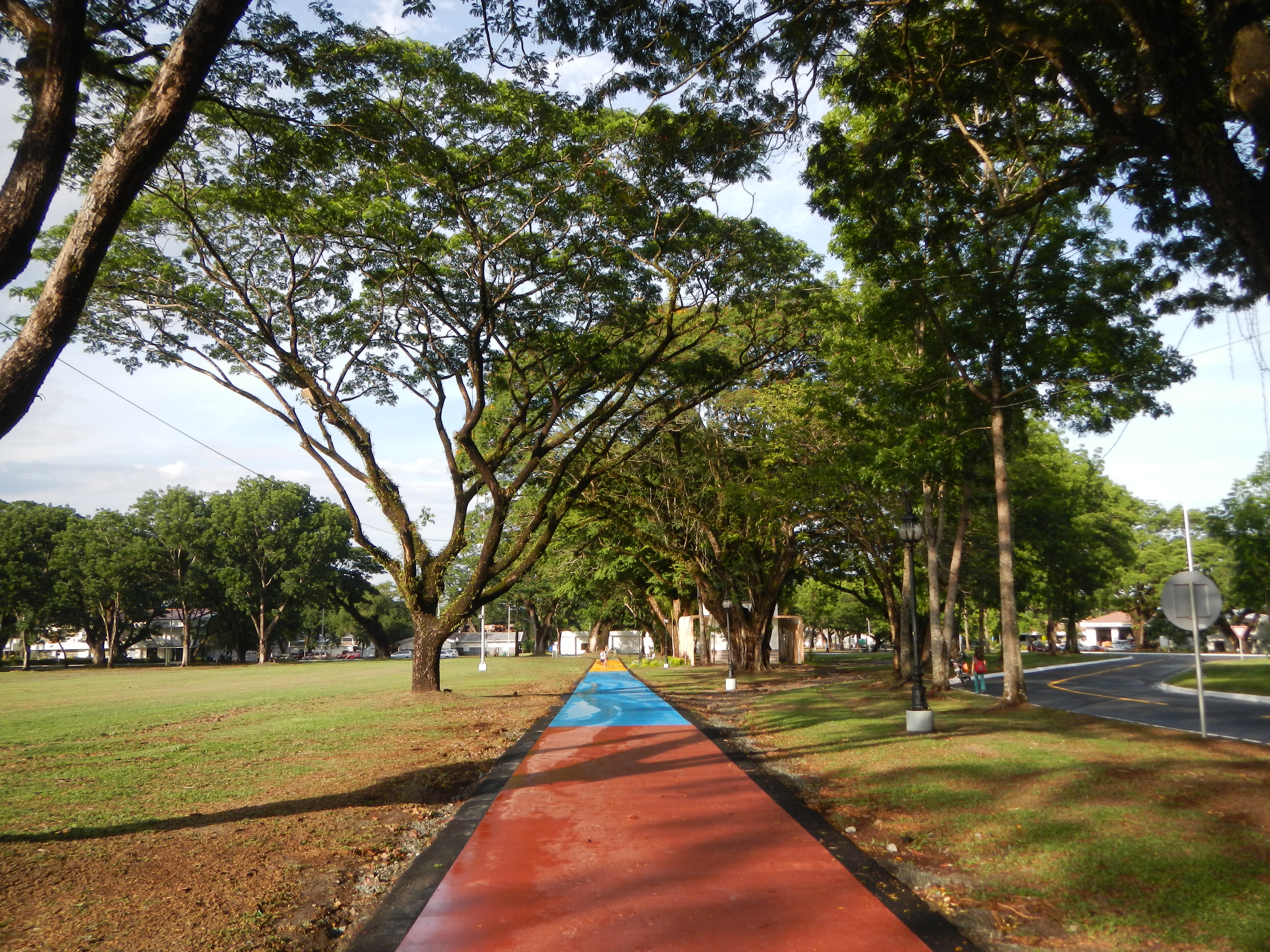
- Location: Clark Freeport Zone, Pampanga, Philippines
- Administrator: Clark Development Corporation

The Clark Parade Grounds, also known as the Clark Development Corporation Parade Grounds (CDC PG), is a sporting open ground at the Clark Freeport Zone in Pampanga, Philippines.

== History ==
The Clark Parade Grounds used to be the parade field of Fort Stotsenburg of the United States Cavalry. It was used by soldiers as a concert venue and a polo field.

In 2015, the Clark Development Corporation made a ₱20.6 million renovation of the parade grounds which included improvement of the jogging path, installation of new lights and other utilities and fixtures.

== Facilities ==
The Clark Parade Grounds is among the frequented places in the Clark area. It hosts sport tourism events and also used for leisure events such as jogging and cycling. The parade grounds hosts a rubberized 2.2 km (1.4 mi) long 2 m (6.6 ft) wide jogging path It also hosts facilities for football.

== Gallery ==
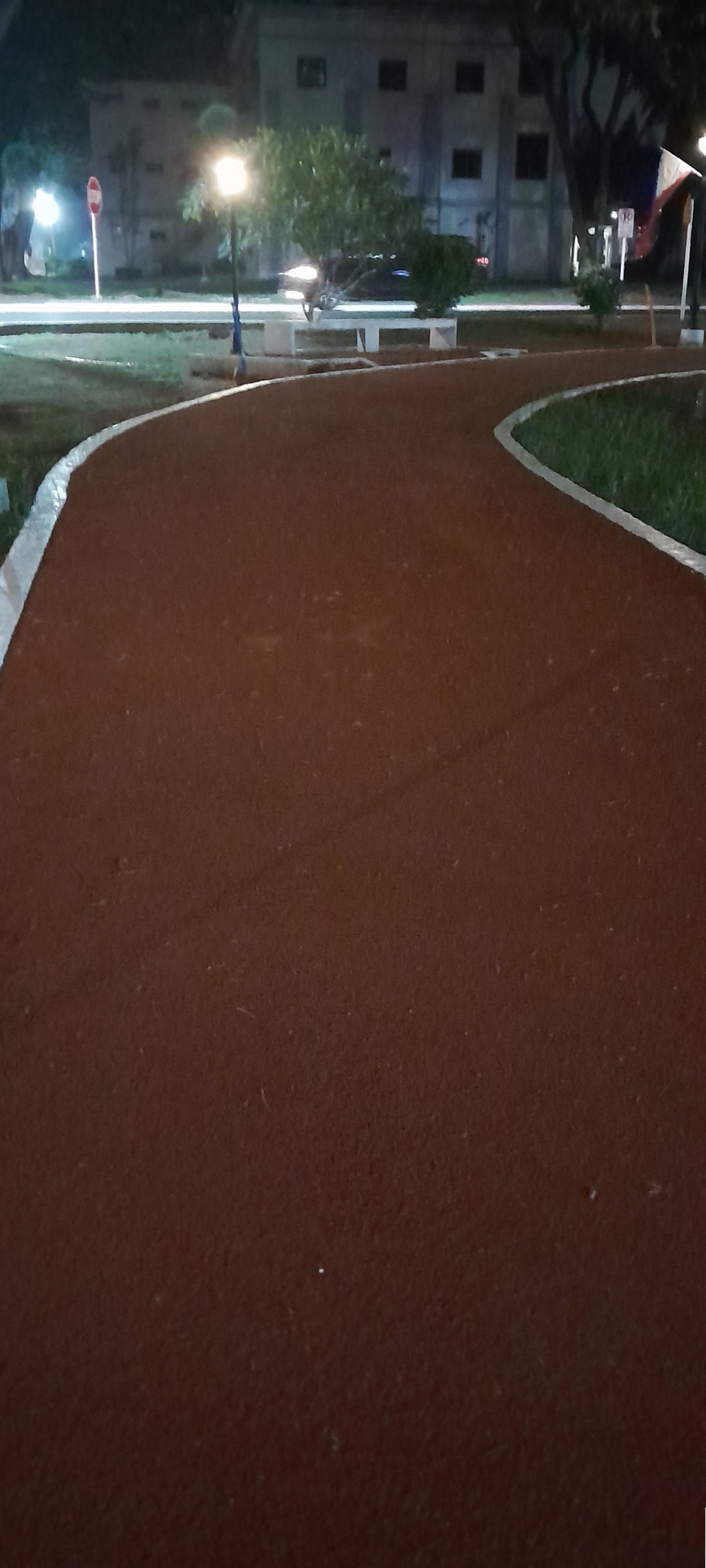
The running track that runs around the Clark Parade Grounds, seen here at night.

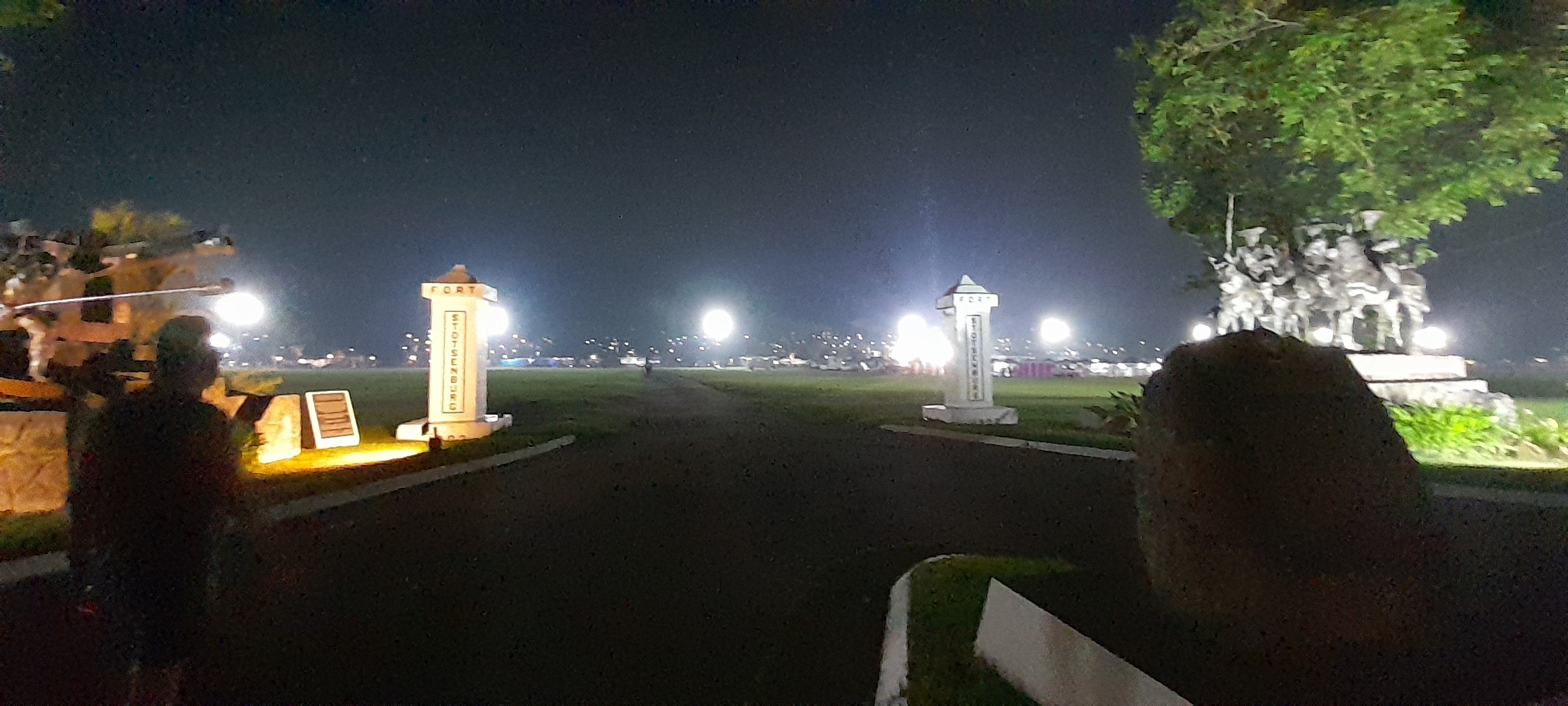
The gateposts of Fort Stotsenburg now functioning as side entrance portals to the Parade Grounds.

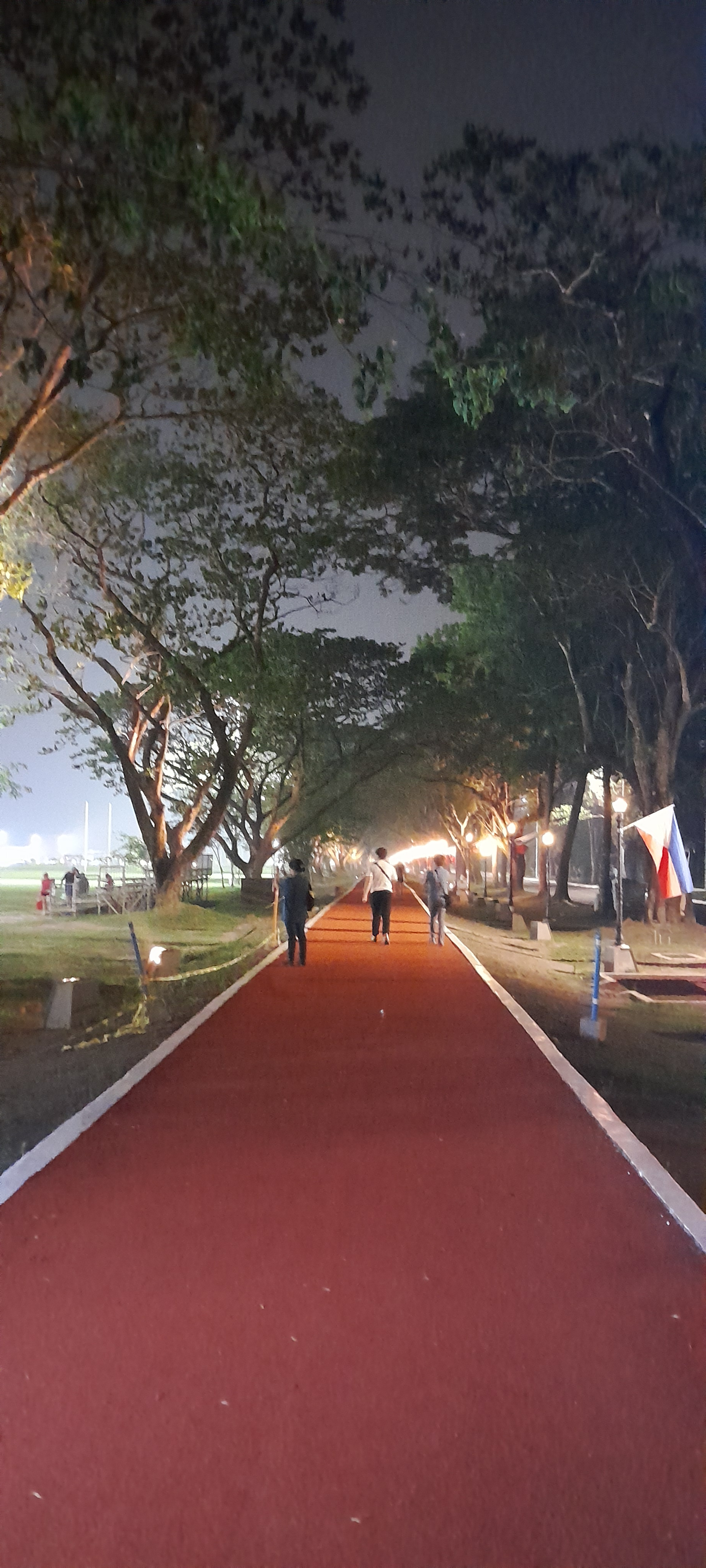
Visitors promenading on Clark Parade Grounds' running track at night.

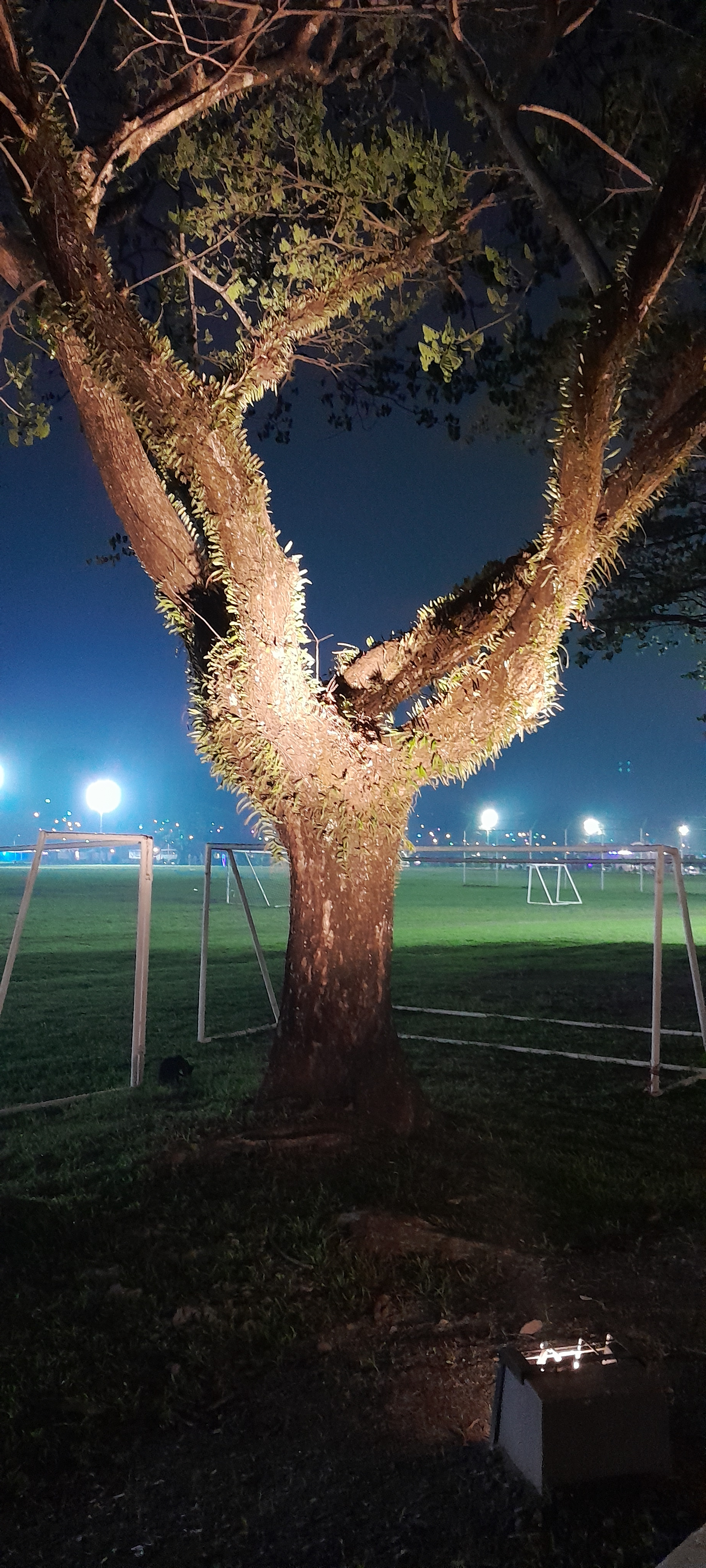
A lighted tree at the side of the Grounds.
