= Esports at the 2019 SEA Games – Dota 2 tournament =

Dota 2 at the 2019 Southeast Asian Games
- Venue: Filoil Flying V Centre
- Dates: 7 – 9 December
- Nations: 8

Medalists
gold medal	PHI	Philippines
silver medal	THA	Thailand
bronze medal	VIE	Vietnam

The Dota 2 tournament for the 2019 Southeast Asian Games were held on December 5 to 8 at the Filoil Flying V Centre in San Juan, Metro Manila.

== Participating teams ==
Eight teams from eight nations participated at the Dota 2 tournament of the 2019 Southeast Asian Games.

- Indonesia (INA)
- Laos (LAO)
- Malaysia (MAS)
- Myanmar (MYA)
- Philippines (PHI)
- Singapore (SGP)
- Thailand (THA)
- Vietnam (VIE)

== Results ==
=== Group stage ===
==== Group A ====
Pos	Team	W	L	Qualification
1	Vietnam (Note: Thailand 0–1 Vietnam)	5	1	Upper Bracket Finals
2	Thailand	5	1	Lower Bracket Semifinals
3	Malaysia	2	4	
4	Singapore	0	6	

Source:One Esport

==== Group B ====
Pos	Team	W	L	Qualification
1	Philippines	5	1	Upper Bracket Finals
2	Laos	4	2	Lower Bracket Semifinals
3	Myanmar	2	4	
4	Indonesia	1	5	

Source:One Esport

=== Final round ===
All playoff games including the Bronze Medal Match were a Bo3 series, except for the Gold Medal Match which was a Bo5 series.

Upper Bracket Final; Lower Bracket Semifinals
A1	Vietnam	0
B1	Philippines	2
B2	Laos	0
A2	Thailand	2

Bronze Medal Match
A1	Vietnam	1
A2	Thailand	2

Gold Medal Match
B1	Philippines	3
A2	Thailand	2

==== Lower Bracket ====
Semifinals

Date		Score		Game 1	Game 2	Game 3	Report
6 December	Laos	0–2	Thailand	THA	THA	-	Report

Finals – Bronze medal

Date		Score		Game 1	Game 2	Game 3	Report
8 December	Vietnam	1–2	Thailand	VIE	THA	THA	Report

==== Upper Bracket ====
Finals

Date		Score		Game 1	Game 2	Game 3	Report
8 December	Vietnam	0–2	Philippines	INA	INA	-	Report

==== Gold medal ====
Date		Score		Game 1	Game 2	Game 3	Report
9 December	Philippines	3–2	Thailand	INA	INA	INA	Report
