= Thailand at the 2019 SEA Games =

Thailand at the 2019 Southeast Asian Games
- IOC code: THA
- NOC: National Olympic Committee of Thailand
- Website: www.olympicthai.or.th/eng (in English and Thai)

in Philippines 30 November - 11 December 2019
- Competitors: 980 in 52 sports
- Flag bearer: Napis Tortungpanich (shooting)
- Officials: 503
- Medals Ranked 3rd: Gold 92 Silver 103 Bronze 123 Total 318

Southeast Asian Games appearances (overview)
- 1961; 1965; 1967; 1969; 1971; 1973; 1975; 1977; 1979; 1981; 1983; 1985; 1987; 1989; 1991; 1993; 1995; 1997; 1999; 2001; 2003; 2005; 2007; 2009; 2011; 2013; 2015; 2017; 2019; 2021; 2023; 2025; 2027; 2029

Thailand participated the 2019 Southeast Asian Games in Philippines from 30 November to 11 December 2019.

== Competitors ==
Sport	Men	Women	Total
Aquatic-Diving	3	3	6
Aquatic-Open water swimming	2	0	2
Aquatic-Swimming	9	15	24
Aquatic-Water polo	13	13	26
Archery	8	8	16
Athletics	46	34	80
Badminton	9	10	19
Baseball	24	0	24
Basketball	16	16	32
Total	130	99	229

== Medal summary ==
=== Medal by sport ===
Medals by sport
Sport	1st place, gold medalist(s)	2nd place, silver medalist(s)	3rd place, bronze medalist(s)	Total
Archery	3	1	2	6
Arnis	0	0	0	0
Athletics	12	11	12	35
Badminton	1	0	1	2
Baseball	0	1	0	1
Basketball	0	3	0	3
Billiards and snooker	1	0	2	3
Bowling	0	2	1	3
Boxing	5	2	2	9
Canoe/Kayak	1	0	2	3
Chess	1	0	0	1
Cycling	7	2	4	13
Dancesport	0	3	7	10
Diving	0	1	1	2
Duathlon	1	1	1	3
Esports	2	2	0	4
Fencing	1	2	4	7
Figure skating	0	0	1	1
Floorball	1	1	0	2
Football	0	1	0	1
Golf	0	2	2	4
Gymnastics	1	3	1	5
Beach Handball	0	1	0	0
Ice hockey	1	0	0	1
Indoor Hockey	0	2	0	2
Judo	7	2	3	12
Ju-jitsu	2	2	6	10
Karate	3	2	3	8
Kickboxing	0	0	0	0
Kurash	2	2	4	8
Lawn Bowls	0	1	1	2
Modern pentathlon	0	5	0	5
Muaythai	4	1	0	5
Netball	0	0	1	1
Obstacle racing	0	0	0	0
Open water swimming	0	0	0	0
Pencak Silat	1	2	1	4
Pétanque	2	1	0	3
Polo	0	0	0	0
Rowing	0	2	0	2
Rugby sevens	0	0	0	0
Sailing	5	2	2	9
Sambo	0	2	5	7
Sepak Takraw	3	0	0	3
Shooting	4	1	2	7
Short track speed skating	2	1	1	4
Skateboarding	0	0	2	2
Softball	0	0	0	0
Soft tennis	0	0	1	1
Squash	0	0	1	1
Surfing	0	0	0	0
Swimming	1	7	1	9
Table tennis	1	1	0	2
Taekwondo	7	3	6	16
Tennis	0	2	3	5
Traditional boat race	1	1	1	3
Triathlon	0	0	0	0
Underwater hockey	0	0	0	0
Volleyball	1	0	1	2
Wakeboarding	0	0	0	0
Water polo	1	0	0	1
Weightlifting	0	0	0	0
Wrestling	0	0	0	0
Wushu	0	1	2	3
Total	41	55	60	156

=== Medal by date ===
Medals by date
Day	Date	1st place, gold medalist(s)	2nd place, silver medalist(s)	3rd place, bronze medalist(s)	Total
1	1 December	5	4	10	17
2	2 December	3	7	6	16
3	3 December	2	4	4	10
4	4 December	5	2	1	8
5	5 December	3	5	9	17
6	6 December	0	0	0	0
7	7 December	0	0	0	0
8	8 December	0	0	0	0
9	9 December	0	0	0	0
10	10 December	0	0	0	0
11	11 December	0	0	1	0
Total		16	22	31	69

=== Medalists ===
Medal	Name	Sport	Event	Date
Gold	Team: Chayanan Khramyoo; Kaithip Saeteaw; Alwani Sathitanon; Napasan Mouksung; Arisara Minsri; Thitirat Somyos; Issaree Turon; Panchita Rodwattanadisakul; Nirawan Chompoopuen; Janista Thinwilai; Khemasiri Sirivejjabandh; Poonnada Rotchanarut; Varistha Saraikarn	Water polo	Women's tournament	1 December
Gold	Keerati Sukprasart	Cycling	Men's cross-country	1 December
Gold	Team: Jeerayut Yaemyim; Anothai Promli; Pi Chaiyakul; Tnakit Kayairit; Prakasit Namsawang; Alexander Rinefalk; Santipong Sukkasem; Pawat Thaidit; Chusak Narkprasert; Aphichet Ratanaprathum; Christian Karlsson; Anupong Srisahwat; Chaianon Sanas; Natthawut Dueankhao; Khemmathat Chummak	Floorball	Men's tournament	1 December
Gold	Saowalak Homklin	Kurash	Women's 57kg	2 December
Gold	Kunathip Yea-on	Kurash	Men's +90kg	2 December
Gold	Napis Tortungpanich	Kurash	Men's 10 m air rifle	2 December
Gold	Natthapat Kancharin	Ice Skating	Men's 500m Short Track Speed Skating	3 December
Gold	Team: Thanawan Thongduang; Ruchira Wongsriwo	Muaythai	Women's Waikru	4 December
Gold	Natthapat Kancharin	Ice Skating	Men's 1000m Short Track Speed Skating	4 December
Gold	Chornnasun Mayakarn	Fencing	Men's foil	4 December
Gold	Team: Sangob Sasipongan; Pongthep Tumrongluk	Judo	Men's Kata	4 December
Gold	Team: Pitima Thaweerattanasinp; Suphattra Jaikhumkao	Judo	Women's Kata	4 December
Gold	Masayuki Terada	Judo	Men's 81kg	5 December
Gold	Team: Pareeya Sonsem; Nattawut Srinate; Siriwan Kuncharin; Arthit Soda	Duathlon	Mixed relay	5 December
Gold	Nitinai Thamkaeo	Pencak silat	Tanding Men's Class A 45–50kg	5 December
Gold	Kachakorn Warasiha	Judo	Women's 52kg	5 December
Gold	Team: Tanaratha Udomchavee; Rumpaipruet Numwong; Khanittha Hongpak; Varapatsorn Radarong	Beach volleyball	Women's beach volleyball team	6 December
Gold	Pitpiboon Mahawattanangkul	Canoeing	Men's C1 1000m	6 December
Gold	Team: Sarawut Sriboonpeng; Thanakorn Sangkaew	Pétanque	Men's doubles	6 December
Gold	Team: Phatipha Wongchuvej; Nantawan Fueangsanit	Pétanque	Women's doubles	6 December
Gold	Thonthan Satjadet	Judo	Women's +78 kg	6 December
Gold	Uaychai Kongsee	Chess	Men's ASEAN	7 December
Gold	Benjaporn Limpanich	Gymnastics	Rhythmic Women's Clubs	7 December
Gold	Pongpol Kulchairattana	Shooting	Men's 10m air pistol	7 December
Gold	Team: Thurakit Boonratanathanakorn; Navuti Liphongyu; Peerapol Chawchiangkwang; Sarawut Sirironnachai	Cycling	Men's team time trial	7 December
Gold	Team: Orawan Paranang; Suthasini Sawettabut	Table tennis	Women's doubles	7 December
Gold	Team: Ratchanok Intanon; Busanan Ongbamrungphan; Pornpawee Chochuwong; Nitchaon Jindapol; Jongkolphan Kititharakul; Rawinda Prajongjai; Puttita Supajirakul; Chayanit Chaladchalam; Phataimas Muenwong; Savitree Amitrapai	Badminton	Women's team	7 December
Gold	Team: Ornawee Srisahakit; Kotchawan Chomchuen; Phenkanya Phaisankiattikun	Taekwondo	Women's recognized team	7 December
Gold	Team: Kittipong Hantratin; Prasit Poolklang; Surasak Puntanam; Wei Puyang; Masayuki Terada	Judo	Men's team	7 December
Gold	Chayut Khongprasit	Athletics	Men's 200m	7 December
Gold	Nuttapong Ketin	Swimming	Men's 200m breaststroke	7 December
Gold	Kieran Tuntivate	Athletics	Men's 10000m	7 December
Gold	Team: Chanokchon Wangsuk; Piyaporn Khemkaew	Sailing	Women's international 420 U19	7 December
Gold	Panwa Boonnak	Sailing	Men's optimist U16	7 December
Gold	Kittipong Boonmawan	Athletics	Men's Hammer throw	7 December
Gold	Team: Anuwat Chaichana; Jirasak Pakbuangoen; Thawisak Thongsai; Sittipong Khamchan; Kritsanapong Nontakote; Pattarapong Yupadee; Jantarit Khukaeo; Assadin Wongyota; Rachan Viphan; Pornthep Tinbangbon; Yotsawat Uthaijaronsri; Pornchai Kaokaew	Sepak takraw	Men's team regu	8 December
Gold	Team: Thurakit Boonratanathanakorn; Thanakhan Chaiyasombat; Navuti Liphongyu; Peerapol Chawchiangkwang; Sarawut Sirironnachai	Cycling	Men's team road race	8 December
Gold	Sarawut Sirironnachai	Cycling	Men's road race	8 December
Gold	Team: Tanapat Pichaikool; Nopparat Panichphol; Vanchai Luangnitikul	Golf	Men's team	8 December
Gold	Patcharaporn Junnguluam	Waterskiing	Women's wakeboard	8 December
Gold	Sanya Phonthip	Waterskiing	Men's wakeboard	8 December
Gold	Team: Kasemsit Borriboonwasin; Jaruwan Chaikan; Nattawut Kaewsri; Praewpan Kawsri; Pornprom Kramsuk; Pranchalee Moonkasem; Patthama Nanthain; Nares Naoprakon; Nipaporn Nopsiri; Arisara PantulapSukanya Phoradok; Phawonrat Roddee; Chitsanupong Sangpan; Mongkhonchai Sanitphakdi; Suwalee Songkramrod; Pornchai Tesdee; Wasan Upalasueb; Natthawat Waenphrom; Tanawoot Waipinid; Phakdee Wannamanee	Canoeing	Mixed 22-seaters 200m	8 December
Gold	Team: Pornsawan Ngernrungruangroj; Tonpan Pokeaw; Tonkhaw Phokaew; Bandhita Srinualnad	Fencing	Team sabre	8 December
Gold	Team: Butsaya Bunrak; Piyamat Chomphumee; Thanaporn Huankid; Chayatip Kuabpimai; Uthumporn Liamrat; Wannaree Meechok; Laksina Nawakaew; Supansa Phaiphimai; Tidarat Sawatnam; Thanachporn Wandee; Rattanaporn Wittayaronnayut; Chitchanok Yusri	Rugby sevens	Women's tournament	8 December
Gold	Naruephon Chittra	Muaythai	Men's 48kg	8 December
Gold	Norapat Khundam	Muaythai	Women's 63.5kg	8 December
Gold	Ketmanee Chasing	Muaythai	Men's 45kg	8 December
Gold	Natta Nachan	Athletics	Women's Javelin throw	8 December
Gold	Parinya Chuaimaroeng	Athletics	Women's Triple jump	8 December
Gold	Mingkamon Koomphon	Athletics	Women's Hammer throw	8 December
Gold	Lakchai Hauihongthong	Taekwondo	Men's under 68kg	8 December
Gold	Nattapat Tantramart	Taekwondo	Men's Over 87kg	8 December
Gold	Team: Ratthawit Khamkong; Noppadon Phaosong; Thanop Kampanthong; Peerapat Thuktham; Wiros Yosiri; Warun Boonpea; Thoranin Trongthaisong; Warawut Anukoon; Wallop Khamwong; Thanawat Wiyaboon; Charoenchai Noonee; Thaworn Sooknakin	Indoor hockey	Men's tournament	8 December
Gold	Kieran Tuntivate	Athletics	Men's 5000m	9 December
Gold	Team: Kanoknapus Kaewchomphu; Kanyavee Maneesombatkul; Kodchaporn Pratumsuwan	Archery	Women's team compound	9 December
Gold	Natsara Champalat	Shooting	Women's 10m air pistol	9 December
Gold	Komet Sukprasert	Cycling	Men's BMX time trial	9 December
Gold	Arm Sukkiaw	Karate	Women's under 61kg	9 December
Gold	Supa Ngamphuengphit	Karate	Men's under 67kg	9 December
Gold	Nipitphum Chatachot	Archery	Men's individual	9 December
Gold	Kanoknapus Kaewchomphu	Archery	Women's individual	9 December
Gold	Teerawat Kangtong	Karate	Men's Over 75kg	9 December
Gold	Banpot Lertthaisong	Jujitsu	Men's under 69kg	9 December
Gold	Cholchaya Junthonglang	Windsurfing	Women's RS:X (8.5m) U19	9 December
Gold	Julanan Khantikulanon	Taekwondo	Women's under 46kg	9 December
Gold	Panipak Wongpattanakit	Taekwondo	Women's under 49kg	9 December
Gold	Ramnarong Sawekwiharee	Taekwondo	Men's under 58kg	9 December
Gold	Chatchai-decha Butdee	Boxing	Men's Bantamweight	9 December
Gold	Nilawan Techasuep	Boxing	Women's Bantamweight	9 December
Gold	Nareupong Thepsen	Taekwondo	Men's under 63kg	9 December
Gold	Wuttichai Masuk	Boxing	Men's welterweight	9 December
Gold	Sudaporn Seesondee	Boxing	Women's Lightweight	9 December
Gold	Anavat Thongkrathok	Boxing	Men's Light heavyweight	9 December
Gold	Team: Supawan Thipat; Uma Chatta-on; Kwanrutai Pakdee; Tassaporn Wannakit	Athletics	Women's 4 × 100 m	9 December
Gold	Team: Natthaphong Chaichanasap; Natpakan Chasiri; Chanon Ketkarn; Tanapol Suntimakorn; Ratthagun Suwanchai; Chitawan Tananitikan	eSports	Arena of Valor	9 December
Gold	Wanida Boonwan	Athletics	Women's High jump	9 December
Gold	Subenrat Insaeng	Athletics	Women's Discus throw	9 December
Gold	Team: Ruttanapon Sowan; Bandit Chuangchai; Jirapong Meenapra; Siripol Punpa	Athletics	Men's 4 × 100 m	9 December
Gold	Team: Athikan Kongkaew; Kaewjai Pumsawangkaew; Sasiwimol Janthasit; Wiphada Chitphuan	Sepak takraw	Women's regu	10 December
Gold	Team: Orawan Paranang; Suthasini Sawettabut	Table tennis	Women's doubles	10 December
Gold	Team: Anuwat Chaichana; Pornchai Kaokaew; Pattarapong Yupadee; Sittipong Khamchan; Kritsanapong Nontakote	Sepak takraw	Men's regu	10 December
Gold	Team: Ajcharaporn Kongyot; Chatchu-on Moksri; Nootsara Tomkom; Pimpichaya Kokram; Piyanut Pannoy; Pleumjit Thinkaow; Pornpun Guedpard; Thatdao Nuekjang; Tichaya Boonlert; Yupa Sanitklang; Watchareeya Nuanjam; Wilavan Apinyapong	Volleyball	Women's tournament	10 December
Gold	Komet Sukprasert	Cycling	Men's BMX race	10 December
Gold	Savate Sresthaporn	Shooting	Men's trap	10 December
Gold	Kritsanut Lertsattayathorn	Billiards	Snooker singles	10 December
Gold	Natdanai Netthip	Jujitsu	Men's under 94kg	10 December
Gold	Art Pakphum Poosa	Cycling	Men's BMX freestyle flat land	10 December
Gold	Arrerat Intadis	Athletics	Women's Shot put	10 December
