= Archery at the 2019 SEA Games – Results =

The archery competitions at the 2019 SEA Games in Philippines took place at Clark Parade Grounds in Mabalacat, Philippines from 5 to 9 December 2019.

The 2019 Games featured competitions in ten events (men 4 events, women 4 events and mixed 2 events).

== Men's individual recurve ==
Men's individual recurve at the 2019 SEA Games
- Date: 5–8 December
- Competitors: 24 from 7 nations

Medalists
gold medal	Hendra Purnama	Indonesia
silver medal	Htike Lin Oo	Myanmar
bronze medal	Riau Ega Agatha	Indonesia

=== Qualification round ===
Note: Two archers from each nation with higher score qualified for knockout round.

Rank	Athlete	Score	10s	Xs
1	Khairul Anuar Mohamad (MAS)	676	36	9
2	Riau Ega Agatha (INA)	671	32	6
3	Htike Lin Oo (MYA)	665	31	9
4	Zarif Syahiir Zolkepeli (MAS)	656	27	6
5	Hendra Purnama (INA)	655	27	13
6	Nguyễn Hoàng Phi Vũ (VIE)	655	22	8
7	Arif Dwi Pangestu (INA)	655	20	4
8	Nguyen Dat Manh (VIE)	653	27	9
9	Nay Lin Oo (MYA)	653	21	3
10	Haziq Kamaruddin (MAS)	650	19	10
11	Witthaya Thamwong (THA)	645	19	7
12	Ryan Adiputro (INA)	644	24	7
13	Florante F. Matan (PHI)	640	21	9
14	Jason Emmanuel Feliciano (PHI)	636	19	7
15	Denchai Thepna (THA)	634	19	7
16	Hoang Van Loc (VIE)	630	19	10
17	Kaung Khant Maw (MYA)	630	16	8
18	Chu Đức Anh (VIE)	627	18	4
19	Carson Francis Hastie (PHI)	625	17	4
20	Akmal Nor Hasrin (MAS)	614	13	3
21	Tanapat Pathairat (THA)	613	15	8
22	Aitthiwat Soithong (THA)	612	13	2
23	Soulivong Onmanee (LAO)	609	10	1
24	Luis Gabriel Moreno (PHI)	596	17	7

=== Knockout round ===
1/8 eliminations
Witthaya Thamwong (THA)	4
Nay Lin Oo (MYA)	6
Hendra Purnama (INA)	7
Denchai Thepna (THA)	3
Soulivong Onmanee (LAO)	4
Zarif Syahiir Zolkepeli (MAS)	6
11	Jason Emmanuel Feliciano (PHI)	5 (9)
6	Nguyễn Hoàng Phi Vũ (VIE)	5 (9*)
7	Nguyen Dat Manh (VIE)	4
10	Florante F. Matan (PHI)	6

Quarterfinals
1	Khairul Anuar Mohamad (MAS)	4
8	Nay Lin Oo (MYA)	6
5	Hendra Purnama (INA)	6
4	Zarif Syahiir Zolkepeli (MAS)	0
3	Htike Lin Oo (MYA)	6
6	Nguyễn Hoàng Phi Vũ (VIE)	0
10	Florante F. Matan (PHI)	3
2	Riau Ega Agatha (INA)	7

Semifinals
8	Nay Lin Oo (MYA)	5 (9)
5	Hendra Purnama (INA)	5 (10)
3	Htike Lin Oo (MYA)	6
2	Riau Ega Agatha (INA)	2

Gold medal match
5	Hendra Purnama (INA)	6
3	Htike Lin Oo (MYA)	4
Bronze medal match
8	Nay Lin Oo (MYA)	0
2	Riau Ega Agatha (INA)	6

== Women's individual recurve ==
Women's individual recurve at the 2019 SEA Games
- Date: 5–8 December
- Competitors: 24 from 7 nations

Medalists
gold medal	Lộc Thị Đào	Vietnam
silver medal	Pyae Sone Hnin	Myanmar
bronze medal	Thidar Nwe	Myanmar

=== Qualification round ===
Note: Two archers from each nation with higher score qualified for knockout round.

Rank	Athlete	Score	10s	Xs
1	Lộc Thị Đào (VIE)	650	22	7
2	Đỗ Thị Ánh Nguyệt (VIE)	644	19	3
3	Diananda Choirunisa (INA)	643	20	6
4	Ha Thi Ngoc (VIE)	640	15	8
5	Thidar Nwe (MYA)	633	17	5
6	Waraporn Phutdee (THA)	629	21	4
7	Pyae Sone Hnin (MYA)	628	21	8
8	Nguyen Thi Phuong (VIE)	625	15	8
9	Linda Lestari (INA)	623	12	4
10	Pia Elizabeth Bidaure (PHI)	622	15	7
11	Narisara Khunhiranchaiyo (THA)	621	19	8
12	Titik Kusumawardani (INA)	621	16	3
13	Gabrielle Monica Bidaure (PHI)	620	16	6
14	Phoebe Nicole Amistoso (PHI)	620	14	8
15	Nur Afisa Abdul Halil (MAS)	619	12	4
16	Kareel Meer Hongitan (PHI)	617	14	6
17	Nur Asiefa Haenza (INA)	614	15	2
18	Yamin Thu (MYA)	608	15	4
19	Nur Aliya Ghapar (MAS)	605	12	4
20	Loke Shin Hui (MAS)	604	13	5
21	Sataporn Artsalee (THA)	595	15	7
22	Nattapat Inkham (THA)	586	13	2
23	Jen Kaboksy (LAO)	568	3	0
24	Nuramalia Haneesha Mazlan (MAS)	547	5	3

=== Knockout round ===
1/8 eliminations
Narisara Khunhiranchaiyo (THA)	6
Pia Elizabeth Bidaure (PHI)	2
Waraporn Phutdee (THA)	6
Nur Aliya Ghapar (MAS)	0
Jen Kaboksy (LAO)	0
Thidar Nwe (MYA)	6
11	Nur Afisa Abdul Halil (MAS)	2
6	Pyae Sone Hnin (MYA)	6
7	Linda Lestari (INA)	4
10	Gabrielle Monica Bidaure (PHI)	6

Quarterfinals
1	Lộc Thị Đào (VIE)	6
9	Narisara Khunhiranchaiyo (THA)	4
5	Waraporn Phutdee (THA)	0
4	Thidar Nwe (MYA)	6
3	Diananda Choirunisa (INA)	4
6	Pyae Sone Hnin (MYA)	6
10	Gabrielle Monica Bidaure (PHI)	1
2	Đỗ Thị Ánh Nguyệt (VIE)	7

Semifinals
1	Lộc Thị Đào (VIE)	6
4	Thidar Nwe (MYA)	4
6	Pyae Sone Hnin (MYA)	7
2	Đỗ Thị Ánh Nguyệt (VIE)	3

Gold medal match
1	Lộc Thị Đào (VIE)	6
6	Pyae Sone Hnin (MYA)	4
Bronze medal match
4	Thidar Nwe (MYA)	5 (9)
2	Đỗ Thị Ánh Nguyệt (VIE)	5 (8)

== Men's team recurve ==
Men's team recurve at the 2019 SEA Games
- Date: 5–8 December
- Competitors: 18 from 6 nations

Medalists
gold medal	Riau Ega Agatha; Hendra Purnama; Arif Dwi Pangestu	Indonesia
silver medal	Khairul Anuar Mohamad; Haziq Kamaruddin; Zarif Syahiir Zolkepeli	Malaysia
bronze medal	Witthaya Thamwong; Denchai Thepna; Tanapat Pathairat	Thailand

=== Seeding round ===
Note: Total score for top three men's archers in the qualification round are used to determine the seeds.

Rank	Country	Athlete	Score	10s	Xs
1	Malaysia (MAS)	Khairul Anuar Mohamad; Haziq Kamaruddin; Zarif Syahiir Zolkepeli	1982	82	25
2	Indonesia (INA)	Riau Ega Agatha; Hendra Purnama; Arif Dwi Pangestu	1981	79	23
3	Myanmar (MYA)	Htike Lin Oo; Nay Lin Oo; Kaung Khant Maw	1948	68	20
4	Vietnam (VIE)	Nguyễn Hoàng Phi Vũ; Nguyen Dat Manh; Hoang Van Loc	1938	68	20
5	Philippines (PHI)	Florante F. Matan; Jason Emmanuel Feliciano; Carson Francis Hastie	1901	57	20
6	Thailand (THA)	Witthaya Thamwong; Denchai Thepna; Tanapat Pathairat	1892	53	22

=== Knockout round ===
Quarterfinals
5	Philippines (PHI)	4(22)
4	Vietnam (VIE)	4 (24)
3	Myanmar (MYA)	0
6	Thailand (THA)	6

Semifinals
1	Malaysia (MAS)	6
4	Vietnam (VIE)	0
6	Thailand (THA)	2
2	Indonesia (INA)	6

Gold medal match
1	Malaysia (MAS)	4 (27)
2	Indonesia (INA)	4 (29)
Bronze medal match
4	Vietnam (VIE)	0
6	Thailand (THA)	6

== Women's team recurve ==
Women's team recurve at the 2019 SEA Games
- Date: 5–8 December
- Competitors: 18 from 6 nations

Medalists
gold medal	Lộc Thị Đào; Đỗ Thị Ánh Nguyệt; Nguyen Thi Phuong	Vietnam
silver medal	Thidar Nwe; Pyae Sone Hnin; Yamin Thu	Myanmar
bronze medal	Diananda Choirunisa; Linda Lestari; Titik Kusumawardani	Indonesia

=== Seeding round ===
Note: Total score for top three women's archers in the qualification round are used to determine the seeds.

Rank	Country	Athlete	Score	10s	Xs
1	Vietnam (VIE)	Lộc Thị Đào; Đỗ Thị Ánh Nguyệt; ~~Ha Thi Ngoc~~; Sub: Nguyen Thi Phuong	1934	56	18
2	Indonesia (INA)	Diananda Choirunisa; Linda Lestari; Titik Kusumawardani	1887	48	13
3	Myanmar (MYA)	Thidar Nwe; Pyae Sone Hnin; Yamin Thu	1869	53	17
4	Philippines (PHI)	Pia Elizabeth Bidaure; Gabrielle Monica Bidaure; Phoebe Nicole Amistoso	1862	45	17
5	Thailand (THA)	Waraporn Phutdee; Narisara Khunhiranchaiyo; Sataporn Artsalee	1845	55	19
6	Malaysia (MAS)	Nur Afisa Abdul Halil; Nur Aliya Ghapar; Loke Shin Hui	1828	37	13

=== Knockout round ===
Quarterfinals
5	Thailand (THA)	4 (26)
4	Philippines (PHI)	4 (24)
3	Myanmar (MYA)	6
6	Malaysia (MAS)	0

Semifinals
1	Vietnam (VIE)	6
5	Thailand (THA)	0
3	Myanmar (MYA)	6
2	Indonesia (INA)	0

Gold medal match
1	Vietnam (VIE)	6
3	Myanmar (MYA)	2
Bronze medal match
5	Thailand (THA)	3
2	Indonesia (INA)	5

== Mixed team recurve ==
Mixed team recurve at the 2019 SEA Games
- Date: 5–8 December
- Competitors: 14 from 7 nations

Medalists
gold medal	Nguyễn Hoàng Phi Vũ; Lộc Thị Đào	Vietnam
silver medal	Riau Ega Agatha; Diananda Choirunisa	Indonesia
bronze medal	Khairul Anuar Mohamad; Nur Afisa Abdul Halil	Malaysia

=== Seeding round ===
Note: Total score for top men's and women's archers in the qualification round are used to determine the seeds.

Rank	Country	Athlete	Score	10s	Xs
1	Indonesia (INA)	Riau Ega Agatha; Diananda Choirunisa	1314	52	12
2	Vietnam (VIE)	Nguyễn Hoàng Phi Vũ; Lộc Thị Đào	1305	44	15
3	Myanmar (MYA)	Htike Lin Oo; Thidar Nwe	1298	48	14
4	Malaysia (MAS)	Khairul Anuar Mohamad; Nur Afisa Abdul Halil	1295	48	13
5	Thailand (THA)	Witthaya Thamwong; ~~Waraporn Phutdee~~; Sub: Narisara Khunhiranchaiyo	1274	40	11
6	Philippines (PHI)	Florante F. Matan; Pia Elizabeth Bidaure	1262	36	16
7	Laos (LAO)	Soulivong Onmanee; Jen Kaboksy	1177	13	1

=== Knockout round ===
Quarterfinals
5	Thailand (THA)	4 (18)
4	Malaysia (MAS)	4 (19)
3	Myanmar (MYA)	6
6	Philippines (PHI)	0
7	Laos (LAO)	3
2	Vietnam (VIE)	5

Semifinals
1	Indonesia (INA)	4 (19)
4	Malaysia (MAS)	4 (18)
3	Myanmar (MYA)	3
2	Vietnam (VIE)	5

Gold medal match
1	Indonesia (INA)	1
2	Vietnam (VIE)	5
Bronze medal match
4	Malaysia (MAS)	5
3	Myanmar (MYA)	1

== Men's individual compound ==
Men's individual compound at the 2019 SEA Games
- Date: 5–9 December
- Competitors: 29 from 9 nations

Medalists
gold medal	Nipitphum Chatachot	Thailand
silver medal	Sirapop Chainak	Thailand
bronze medal	Yoke Rizaldi Akbar	Indonesia

=== Qualification round ===
Note: Two archers from each nation with higher score qualified for knockout round.

Rank	Athlete	Score	10s	Xs
1	Mohd Juwaidi Mazuki (MAS)	709	61	25
2	Nguyen Van Day (VIE)	704	56	24
3	Yoke Rizaldi Akbar (INA)	702	54	22
4	Paul Marton De La Cruz (PHI)	701	54	31
5	Zulfadhli Ruslan (MAS)	699	51	24
6	Kevin Juliano Fathananda (INA)	697	49	23
7	Prima Wisnu Wardhana (INA)	694	46	12
8	Alan Lee Chung Hee (SGP)	693	47	22
9	Nitiphum Chatachot (THA)	692	46	16
10	Ang Han Teng (SGP)	692	45	10
11	Sirapop Chainak (THA)	690	54	17
12	Thach Phi Hung (VIE)	689	43	20
13	Muhamad Rindarto (INA)	687	43	13
14	Syahrizan Jafar (MAS)	686	42	19
15	Zin Thu Rain Mhu (MYA)	685	40	11
16	Arnold Rojas (PHI)	684	41	18
17	Dhansarit Itsarangkun (THA)	681	44	22
18	Nguyen Tien Cuong (VIE)	681	36	23
19	Feliciano Andrei Johann (PHI)	677	35	11
20	Khambeswaran Mohanaraja (MAS)	676	33	8
21	Goh Jun Hui (SGP)	675	38	16
22	Roberto Badiola (PHI)	670	33	11
23	Aung Myo Thu (MYA)	669	31	15
24	Khwanchai Phohiran (THA)	668	32	12
25	Khant Myo (MYA)	665	30	10
26	Pang Toh Jin (SGP)	663	25	8
27	Lot Outtaliyung (LAO)	662	32	11
28	Hein Htet Aung (MYA)	651	31	10
29	Mai Xuan Duc (VIE)	648	18	5

=== Knockout round ===
1/8 eliminations
Ang Han Teng (SGP)	145
Nipitphum Chatachot (THA)	147
Zulfadhli Ruslan (MAS)	146
Zin Thu Rain Mhu (MYA)	142
Arnold Rojas (PHI)	139
Paul Marton de la Cruz (PHI)	145
3	Yoke Rizaldi Akbar (INA)	143
14	Aung Myo Thu (MYA)	136
11	Thach Phi Hung (VIE)	144
6	Kevin Juliano Fathananda (INA)	145
7	Alan Lee Chung Hee (SGP)	143
10	Sirapop Chainak (THA)	145
15	Lot Outtaliyung (LAO)	132
2	Nguyen Van Day (VIE)	145

Quarterfinals
1	Mohd Juwaidi Mazuki (MAS)	145 (9)
8	Nipitphum Chatachot (THA)	145 (X)
5	Zulfadhli Ruslan (MAS)	146
4	Paul Marton de la Cruz (PHI)	144
3	Yoke Rizaldi Akbar (INA)	140
6	Kevin Juliano Fathananda (INA)	135
10	Sirapop Chainak (THA)	145
2	Nguyen Van Day (VIE)	141

Semifinals
8	Nipitphum Chatachot (THA)	144 (X)
5	Zulfadhli Ruslan (MAS)	144 (10)
3	Yoke Rizaldi Akbar (INA)	144
10	Sirapop Chainak (THA)	145

Gold medal match
8	Nipitphum Chatachot (THA)	141 (10)
10	Sirapop Chainak (THA)	141 (9)
Bronze medal match
5	Zulfadhli Ruslan (MAS)	143
3	Yoke Rizaldi Akbar (INA)	145

== Women's individual compound ==
Women's individual compound at the 2019 SEA Games
- Date: 5–9 December
- Competitors: 29 from 9 nations

Medalists
gold medal	Kanoknapus Kaewchomphu	Thailand
silver medal	Fatin Nurfatehah Mat Salleh	Malaysia
bronze medal	Hlang Su Su	Myanmar

=== Qualification round ===
Note: Two archers from each nation with higher score qualified for knockout round.

Rank	Athlete	Score	10s	Xs
1	Triya Resky Andriyani (INA)	689	43	22
2	Fatin Nurfatehah Mat Salleh (MAS)	689	43	17
3	Kanyavee Maneesombatkul (THA)	687	43	19
4	Châu Kiều Oanh (VIE)	686	43	13
5	Kanoknapus Kaewchomphu (THA)	686	42	13
6	Nina Bonita Pereira Yurike (INA)	686	40	12
7	Le Phuong Thao (VIE)	683	37	11
8	Sonekeo Xaiyavong (LAO)	682	39	16
9	Sri Ranti (INA)	680	37	17
10	Contessa Loh Tze Chieh (SGP)	680	36	14
11	Rachelle Anne de la Cruz (PHI)	679	40	18
12	Kayla Adinda Utomo (INA)	678	38	14
13	Abbigail Pineda Tindugan (PHI)	676	33	11
14	Andrea Robles (PHI)	673	38	7
15	Nguyen Tuong Vy (VIE)	673	31	8
16	Jennifer Dy Chan (PHI)	673	29	12
17	Madeleine Ong Xue Li (SGP)	672	34	15
18	Iman Aisyah Norazam (MAS)	670	33	14
19	Hlang Su Su (MYA)	670	32	12
20	Nurul Syazhera Mohd Asmi (MAS)	670	27	9
21	Nguyen Thi Nhat Le (VIE)	669	30	13
22	Kodchaporn Pratumsuwan (THA)	664	29	10
23	Nur Aina Yasmine Halim (MAS)	658	22	9
24	Nareumon Junsook (THA)	656	26	5
25	Angeline Lee Jia Hui (SGP)	642	21	4
26	Nan Khin Sein (MYA)	639	16	5
27	Nu Lwin San (MYA)	373	1	0

=== Knockout round ===
1/8 eliminations
Contessa Loh Tze Chieh (SGP)	141
Sonekeo Xaiyavong (LAO)	134
Kanoknapus Kaewchomphu (THA)	144
Madeleine Ong Xue Li (SGP)	139
Iman Aisyah Norazam (MAS)	140
Châu Kiều Oanh (VIE)	145
3	Kanyavee Maneesombatkul (THA)	137
14	Hlang Su Su (MYA)	140
11	Abbigail Pineda Tindugan (PHI)	130
6	Nina Bonita Pereira Yurike (INA)	137
7	Le Phuong Thao (VIE)	141
10	Rachelle Anne de la Cruz (PHI)	133
15	Nan Khin Sein (MYA)	132
2	Fatin Nurfatehah Mat Salleh (MAS)	142

Quarterfinals
1	Triya Resky Andriyani (INA)	139
9	Contessa Loh Tze Chieh (SGP)	140
5	Kanoknapus Kaewchomphu (THA)	142
4	Châu Kiều Oanh (VIE)	137
14	Hlang Su Su (MYA)	140
6	Nina Bonita Pereira Yurike (INA)	135
7	Le Phuong Thao (VIE)	141
2	Fatin Nurfatehah Mat Salleh (MAS)	145

Semifinals
9	Contessa Loh Tze Chieh (SGP)	144
5	Kanoknapus Kaewchomphu (THA)	145
14	Hlang Su Su (MYA)	132
2	Fatin Nurfatehah Mat Salleh (MAS)	144

Gold medal match
5	Kanoknapus Kaewchomphu (THA)	146
2	Fatin Nurfatehah Mat Salleh (MAS)	141
Bronze medal match
9	Contessa Loh Tze Chieh (SGP)	135
14	Hlang Su Su (MYA)	137

== Men's team compound ==
Men's team compound at the 2019 SEA Games
- Date: 5–9 December
- Competitors: 21 from 7 nations

Medalists
gold medal	Mohd Juwaidi Mazuki; Zulfadhli Ruslan; Khambeswaran Mohanaraja	Malaysia
silver medal	Nguyen Van Day; Thach Phi Hung; Nguyen Tien Cuong	Vietnam
bronze medal	Nitiphum Chatachot; Sirapop Chainak; Dhansarit Itsarangkun	Thailand

=== Seeding round ===
Note: Total score for top three men's archers in the qualification round are used to determine the seeds.

Rank	Country	Athlete	Score	10s	Xs
1	Malaysia (MAS)	Mohd Juwaidi Mazuki; Zulfadhli Ruslan; ~~Syahrizan Jafar~~; Sub: Khambeswaran Mohanaraja	2094	154	68
2	Indonesia (INA)	Yoke Rizaldi Akbar; Kevin Juliano Fathananda; Prima Wisnu Wardhana	2093	149	57
3	Vietnam (VIE)	Nguyen Van Day; Thach Phi Hung; Nguyen Tien Cuong	2074	135	67
4	Thailand (THA)	Nitiphum Chatachot; Sirapop Chainak; Dhansarit Itsarangkun	2063	144	55
5	Philippines (PHI)	Paul Marton de la Cruz; Arnold Rojas; Feliciano Andrei Johann	2062	130	60
6	Singapore (SGP)	Alan Lee Chung Hee; Ang Han Teng; Goh Jun Hui	2060	130	48
7	Myanmar (MYA)	Zin Thu Rain Mhu; Aung Myo Thu; Khant Myo	2019	101	36

=== Knockout round ===
Quarterfinals
5	Philippines (PHI)	225
4	Thailand (THA)	234
3	Vietnam (VIE)	225
6	Singapore (SGP)	224
7	Myanmar (MYA)	223
2	Indonesia (INA)	232

Semifinals
1	Malaysia (MAS)	234
4	Thailand (THA)	229
3	Vietnam (VIE)	222
2	Indonesia (INA)	220

Gold medal match
1	Malaysia (MAS)	224
3	Vietnam (VIE)	216
Bronze medal match
4	Thailand (THA)	227
2	Indonesia (INA)	222

== Women's team compound ==
Women's team compound at the 2019 SEA Games
- Date: 5–9 December
- Competitors: 21 from 7 nations

Medalists
gold medal	Kanyavee Maneesombatkul; Kanoknapus Kaewchomphu; Kodchaporn Pratumsuwan	Thailand
silver medal	Triya Resky Adriyani; Nina Bonita Pereira Yurike; Sri Ranti	Indonesia
bronze medal	Châu Kiều Oanh; Le Phuong Thao; Nguyen Tuong Vy	Vietnam

=== Seeding round ===
Note: Total score for top three women's archers in the qualification round are used to determine the seeds.

Rank	Country	Athlete	Score	10s	Xs
1	Indonesia (INA)	Triya Resky Adriyani; Nina Bonita Pereira Yurike; Sri Ranti	2055	120	51
2	Vietnam (VIE)	Châu Kiều Oanh; Le Phuong Thao; Nguyen Tuong Vy	2042	111	32
3	Thailand (THA)	Kanyavee Maneesombatkul; Kanoknapus Kaewchomphu; Kodchaporn Pratumsuwan	2037	114	46
4	Malaysia (MAS)	Fatin Nurfatehah Mat Salleh; Iman Aisyah Norazam; Nurul Syazhera Mohd Asmi	2029	103	40
5	Philippines (PHI)	Rachelle Anne de la Cruz; Abbigail Pineda Tindugan; Andrea Robles	2028	111	36
6	Singapore (SGP)	Contessa Loh Tze Chieh; Madeleine Ong Xue Li; Angeline Lee Jia Hui	1994	91	33
7	Myanmar (MYA)	Hlang Su Su; Nan Khin Sein; Nu Lwin San	1682	49	17

=== Knockout round ===
Quarterfinals
5	Philippines (PHI)	226
4	Malaysia (MAS)	224
3	Thailand (THA)	170
6	Singapore (SGP)	156
7	Myanmar (MYA)	183
2	Vietnam (VIE)	219

Semifinals
1	Indonesia (INA)	222
5	Philippines (PHI)	216
3	Thailand (THA)	222
2	Vietnam (VIE)	212

Gold medal match
1	Indonesia (INA)	217
3	Thailand (THA)	220
Bronze medal match
5	Philippines (PHI)	215
2	Vietnam (VIE)	216

== Mixed team compound ==
Mixed team compound at the 2019 SEA Games
- Date: 5–9 December
- Competitors: 16 from 8 nations

Medalists
gold medal	Paul Marton de la Cruz; Rachelle Anne de la Cruz	Philippines
silver medal	Nguyen Van Day; Châu Kiều Oanh	Vietnam
bronze medal	Prima Wisnu Wardhana; Sri Ranti	Indonesia

=== Seeding round ===
Note: Total score for top men's and women's archers in the qualification round are used to determine the seeds.

Rank	Country	Athlete	Score	10s	Xs
1	Malaysia (MAS)	Mohd Juwaidi Mazuki; Fatin Nurfatehah Mat Salleh	1398	104	42
2	Indonesia (INA)	~~Yoke Rizaldi Akbar~~; Sub: Prima Wisnu Wardhana; ~~Triya Resky Adriyani~~; Sub: Sri Ranti	1391	97	44
3	Vietnam (VIE)	Nguyen Van Day; Châu Kiều Oanh	1390	99	37
4	Philippines (PHI)	Paul Marton de la Cruz; Rachelle Anne de la Cruz	1380	94	37
5	Thailand (THA)	Nitipum Chatachot; Kanyavee Maneesombatkul	1379	89	35
6	Singapore (SGP)	Alan Lee Chung Hee; Contessa Loh Tze Chieh	1373	83	36
7	Myanmar (MYA)	Zin Thu Rain Mhu; Hlang Su Su	1355	72	23
8	Laos (LAO)	Lot Outtaliyung; Sonekeo Xaiyavong	1344	71	27

=== Knockout round ===
Quarterfinals
1	Malaysia (MAS)	151
8	Laos (LAO)	146
5	Thailand (THA)	150
4	Philippines (PHI)	151
3	Vietnam (VIE)	155
6	Singapore (SGP)	154
7	Myanmar (MYA)	146
2	Indonesia (INA)	149

Semifinals
1	Malaysia (MAS)	148
4	Philippines (PHI)	153
3	Vietnam (VIE)	150
2	Indonesia (INA)	149

Gold medal match
4	Philippines (PHI)	148
3	Vietnam (VIE)	147
Bronze medal match
1	Malaysia (MAS)	150
2	Indonesia (INA)	152
