= Volleyball at the 2019 SEA Games – Women's beach volleyball tournament =

Women at the 2019 Southeast Asian Games
- Venue: Subic Tennis Courts
- Dates: 29 November – 6 December 2019
- Competitors: 24 from 6 nations

Medalists
| gold medal | Udomchavee-Numwong; Radarong-Hongpak | Thailand |
| silver medal | Utami-Juliana; Mutakharah-Ratnasari | Indonesia |
| bronze medal | Rondina-Pons; Rodriguez-Gervacio | Philippines |

The women's beach volleyball tournament at the 2019 Southeast Asian Games took place at the Subic Tennis Court, Subic, Philippines from 29 November to 6 December 2019.

== Schedule ==
All times are Philippine Time (UTC+08:00)

| Date | Time | Event |
|---|---|---|
| Friday, 29 November 2019 | 17:30 | Round robin |
| Sunday, 1 December 2019 | 14:00 | Round robin |
| Monday, 2 December 2019 | 9:00 | Round robin |
| Tuesday, 3 December 2019 | 9:00 | Round robin |
| Wednesday, 4 December 2019 | 17:30 | Round robin |
| Thursday, 5 December 2019 | 14:00 | Round robin |
| Friday, 6 December 2019 | 9:00 | Round robin |

== Results ==
=== Round Robin ===
| Date | | Score | | Set 1 | Set 2 | Set 3 |
|---|---|---|---|---|---|---|
| 29 November | Putu Utami - Dhita Juliana; Indonesia | 2–1 | Sisi Rondina - Bernadeth Pons; Philippines | 21–18 | 16–21 | 15-13 |
| 29 November | Varapatsorn Radarong - Khanittha Hongpak; Thailand | 2–0 | Tan Hsi Yan - Mae Tasha; Malaysia | 21–10 | 21–6 | - |
| 29 November | Allysah Mutakharah - Desi Ratnasari; Indonesia | 2–0 | Dij Rodriguez - Dzi Gervacio; Philippines | 21–14 | 21–16 | - |
| 29 November | Tanarattha Udomchavee - Rumpaipruet Numwong; Thailand | 2–0 | Foo Sin Xi - Joo Shu Woon; Malaysia | 21–11 | 21–11 | - |
| 1 December | Lau Ee Shan - Serene Ng; Singapore | 0–2 | Varapatsorn Radarong - Khanittha Hongpak; Thailand | 5–21 | 6–21 | - |
| 1 December | Sisi Rondina - Bernadeth Pons; Philippines | 2–1 | Nguyen Thi Thanh Tram - Truong Duong My Huyen; Vietnam | 21–8 | 17–21 | 15-7 |
| 1 December | Dij Rodriguez - Dzi Gervacio; Philippines | 0-2 | Vu Ngoc Lan Nguyen - Nguyen Le Thi Tuong Vy; Vietnam | 14–21 | 16–21 | - |
| 1 December | Eliza Hui Hui Chong - Gladys Lee; Singapore | 0–2 | Tanarattha Udomchavee - Rumpaipruet Numwong; Thailand | 15–21 | 12–21 | - |
| 1 December | Sisi Rondina - Bernadeth Pons; Philippines | 2–0 | Vu Ngoc Lan Nguyen - Nguyen Le Thi Tuong Vy; Vietnam | 22–20 | 21–15 | - |
| 2 December | Varapatsorn Radarong - Khanittha Hongpak; Thailand | 2–0 | Nguyen Thi Thanh Tram - Truong Duong My Huyen; Vietnam | 21–19 | 21–17 | - |
| 2 December | Lau Ee Shan - Serene Ng; Singapore | 0–2 | Putu Utami - Dhita Juliana; Indonesia | 9–21 | 15–21 | - |
| 2 December | Tan Hsi Yan - Mae Tasha; Malaysia | 0–2 | Sisi Rondina - Bernadeth Pons; Philippines | 13–21 | 9–21 | - |
| 2 December | Tanarattha Udomchavee - Rumpaipruet Numwong; Thailand | 2–0 | Vu Ngoc Lan Nguyen - Nguyen Le Thi Tuong Vy; Vietnam | 21–17 | 21–16 | - |
| 2 December | Eliza Hui Hui Chong - Gladys Lee; Singapore | 0–2 | Allysah Mutakharah - Desi Ratnasari; Indonesia | 15–21 | 13–21 | - |
| 2 December | Foo Sin Xi - Joo Shu Woon; Malaysia | 1–2 | Dij Rodriguez - Dzi Gervacio; Philippines | 21–17 | 13–21 | 7–15 |
| 3 December | Sisi Rondina - Bernadeth Pons; Philippines | 0–2 | Varapatsorn Radarong - Khanittha Hongpak; Thailand | 24–26 | 15–21 | - |
| 3 December | Tan Hsi Yan - Mae Tasha; Malaysia | 2–0 | Lau Ee Shan - Serene Ng; Singapore | 21–13 | 21–12 | - |
| 3 December | Dij Rodriguez - Dzi Gervacio; Philippines | 0–2 | Tanarattha Udomchavee - Rumpaipruet Numwong; Thailand | 16–21 | 14–21 | - |
| 3 December | Foo Sin Xi - Joo Shu Woon; Malaysia | 2–0 | Eliza Hui Hui Chong - Gladys Lee; Singapore | 21–18 | 21–13 | - |
| 4 December | Putu Utami - Dhita Juliana; Indonesia | 2–0 | Tan Hsi Yan - Mae Tasha; Malaysia | 21–14 | 21–15 | - |
| 4 December | Nguyen Thi Thanh Tram - Truong Duong My Huyen; Vietnam | 2–0 | Lau Ee Shan - Serene Ng; Singapore | 21–11 | 22–18 | - |
| 4 December | Allysah Mutakharah - Desi Ratnasari; Indonesia | 2–1 | Foo Sin Xi - Joo Shu Woon; Malaysia | 21–12 | 16–21 | 15-9 |
| 4 December | Vu Ngoc Lan Nguyen - Nguyen Le Thi Tuong Vy; Vietnam | 2–0 | Eliza Hui Hui Chong - Gladys Lee; Singapore | 23–21 | 21–4 | - |
| 5 December | Varapatsorn Radarong - Khanittha Hongpak; Thailand | 1–2 | Putu Utami - Dhita Juliana; Indonesia | 15–21 | 21–12 | 13-15 |
| 5 December | Tan Hsi Yan - Mae Tasha; Malaysia | 1–2 | Nguyen Thi Thanh Tram - Truong Duong My Huyen; Vietnam | 21–18 | 6–21 | 8-15 |
| 5 December | Tanarattha Udomchavee - Rumpaipruet Numwong; Thailand | 2–0 | Allysah Mutakharah - Desi Ratnasari; Indonesia | 21–18 | 6–1 | - |
| 5 December | Foo Sin Xi - Joo Shu Woon; Malaysia | 0–2 | Vu Ngoc Lan Nguyen - Nguyen Le Thi Tuong Vy; Vietnam | 13–21 | 15–21 | - |
| 5 December | Tanarattha Udomchavee - Rumpaipruet Numwong; Thailand | 2–1 | Putu Utami - Dhita Juliana; Indonesia | 17–21 | 23–21 | 20-18 |
| 6 December | Sisi Rondina - Bernadeth Pons; Philippines | 2–0 | Lau Ee Shan - Serene Ng; Singapore | 21–17 | 21–13 | - |
| 6 December | Nguyen Thi Thanh Tram - Truong Duong My Huyen; Vietnam | 0–2 | Putu Utami - Dhita Juliana; Indonesia | 12–21 | 14–21 | - |
| 6 December | Dij Rodriguez - Dzi Gervacio; Philippines | 2–0 | Eliza Hui Hui Chong - Gladys Lee; Singapore | 21–18 | 21–16 | - |
| 6 December | Vu Ngoc Lan Nguyen - Nguyen Le Thi Tuong Vy; Vietnam | 1–1 | Allysah Mutakharah - Desi Ratnasari; Indonesia | 4–4 | - | - |
| 6 December | Putu Utami - Dhita Juliana; Indonesia | 2–0 | Vu Ngoc Lan Nguyen - Nguyen Le Thi Tuong Vy; Vietnam | 23–21 | 21–17 | - |

== Final standing ==
| Rank | Team | Pld | W | D | L |
|---|---|---|---|---|---|
| 1st place, gold medalist(s) | Tanarattha Udomchavee - Rumpaipruet Numwong; Thailand | 6 | 6 | 0 | 0 |
| 1st place, gold medalist(s) | Varapatsorn Radarong - Khanittha Hongpak; Thailand | 5 | 4 | 0 | 1 |
| 2nd place, silver medalist(s) | Putu Utami - Dhita Juliana; Indonesia | 7 | 6 | 0 | 1 |
| 2nd place, silver medalist(s) | Allysah Mutakharah - Desi Ratnasari; Indonesia | 5 | 3 | 1 | 1 |
| 3rd place, bronze medalist(s) | Sisi Rondina - Bernadeth Pons; Philippines | 6 | 3 | 0 | 3 |
| 3rd place, bronze medalist(s) | Dij Rodriguez - Dzi Gervacio; Philippines | 5 | 2 | 0 | 3 |
| 4 | Vu Ngoc Lan Nguyen - Nguyen Le Thi Tuong Vy; Vietnam | 7 | 3 | 1 | 3 |
| 4 | Nguyen Thi Thanh Tram - Truong Duong My Huyen; Vietnam | 5 | 2 | 0 | 3 |
| 5 | Foo Sin Xi - Joo Shu Woon; Malaysia | 5 | 1 | 0 | 4 |
| 5 | Tan Hsi Yan - Mae Tasha; Malaysia | 5 | 1 | 0 | 4 |
| 6 | Eliza Hui Hui Chong - Gladys Lee; Singapore | 5 | 0 | 0 | 5 |
| 6 | Lau Ee Shan - Serene Ng; Singapore | 5 | 0 | 0 | 5 |
