= Pétanque at the 2019 SEA Games =

- Venue: Royce Hotel and Casino
- Location: Mabalacat, Pampanga, Philippines
- Date: 2–6 December

The pétanque competitions at the 2019 SEA Games in Philippines were held at the Royce Hotel and Casino at the Clark Freeport Zone in Mabalacat, Pampanga between 2 and 6 December 2019.

== Medal table ==
* Host nation (Philippines)

Rank	Nation	Gold	Silver	Bronze	Total
1	Thailand (THA)	2	1	0	3
2	Malaysia (MAS)	1	1	2	4
3	Cambodia (CAM)	1	1	0	2
4	Laos (LAO)	0	1	3	4
5	Vietnam (VIE)	0	0	2	2
6	Myanmar (MYA)	0	0	1	1
Totals (6 entries)		4	4	8	16

== Medalists ==
=== Men ===
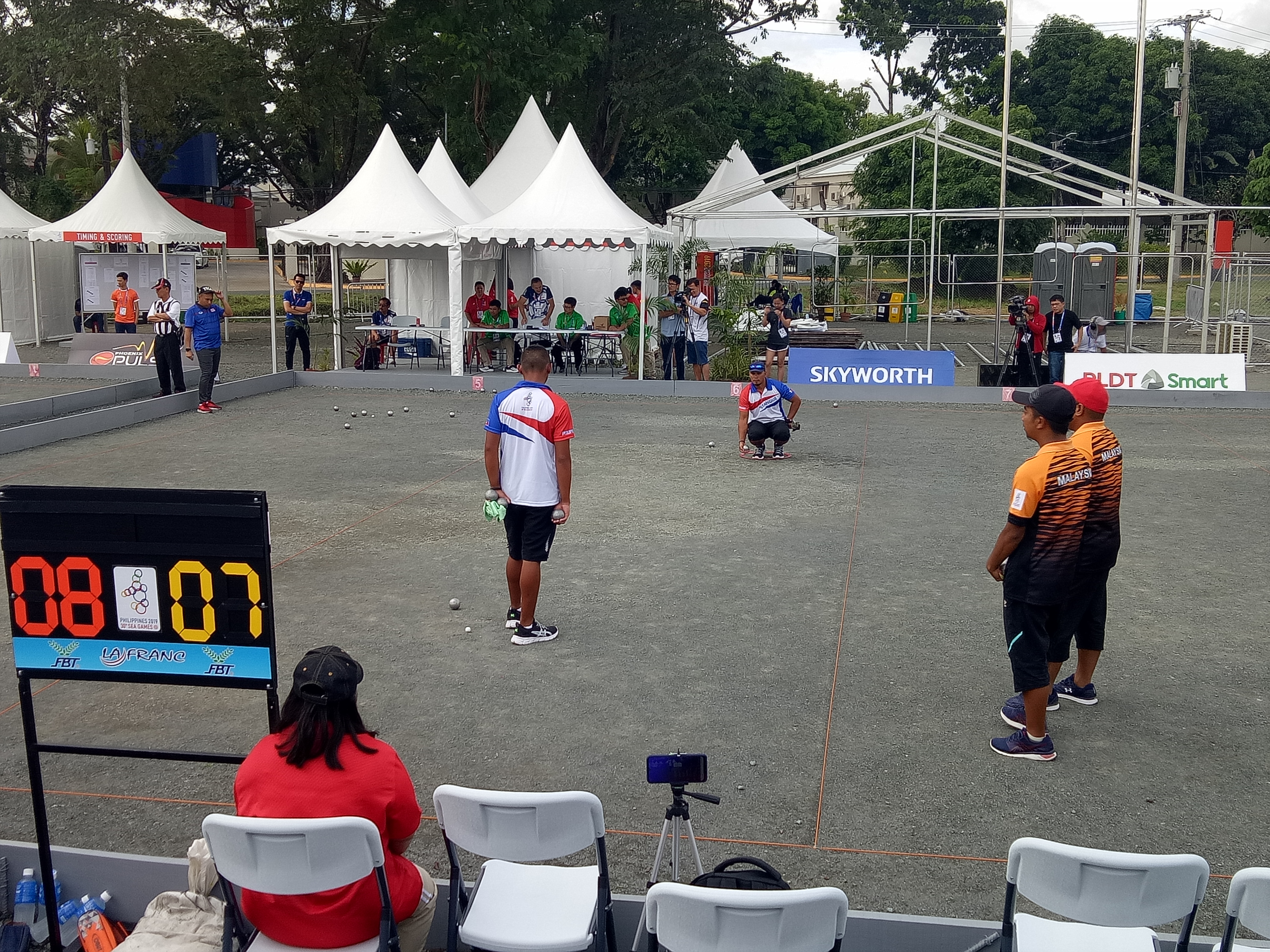
Philippines (white) vs Malaysia (orange) at the men's doubles event.

Event	Gold	Silver	Bronze
Doubles	Thailand (THA); Sarawut Sriboonpeng; Thanakorn Sangkaew	Cambodia (CAM); Sok Chanmean; Nhem Bora	Laos (LAO); Phoudthala Keokannika; Souphakone Lattanaborvone
Doubles	Thailand (THA); Sarawut Sriboonpeng; Thanakorn Sangkaew	Cambodia (CAM); Sok Chanmean; Nhem Bora	Malaysia (MAS); Mohd Nurul Azwan Termizi; Mohd Firdaus Adli Bakri
Triples	Malaysia (MAS); Muhamad Hafizudin Mat Daud; Syed Akmal Fikri Syed Ali; Saiful Bahri Musmin	Thailand (THA); Wanchaloem Srimueang; Piyabut Chamchoi; Panukorn Roeksanit	Vietnam (VIE); Lý Mỹ Văn; Lý Ngọc Tài; Ngô Ron
Triples	Malaysia (MAS); Muhamad Hafizudin Mat Daud; Syed Akmal Fikri Syed Ali; Saiful Bahri Musmin	Thailand (THA); Wanchaloem Srimueang; Piyabut Chamchoi; Panukorn Roeksanit	Laos (LAO); Soulasith Khamvongsa; Khamfan Sengkeo; Chanthaphone Keomanyvong

=== Women ===
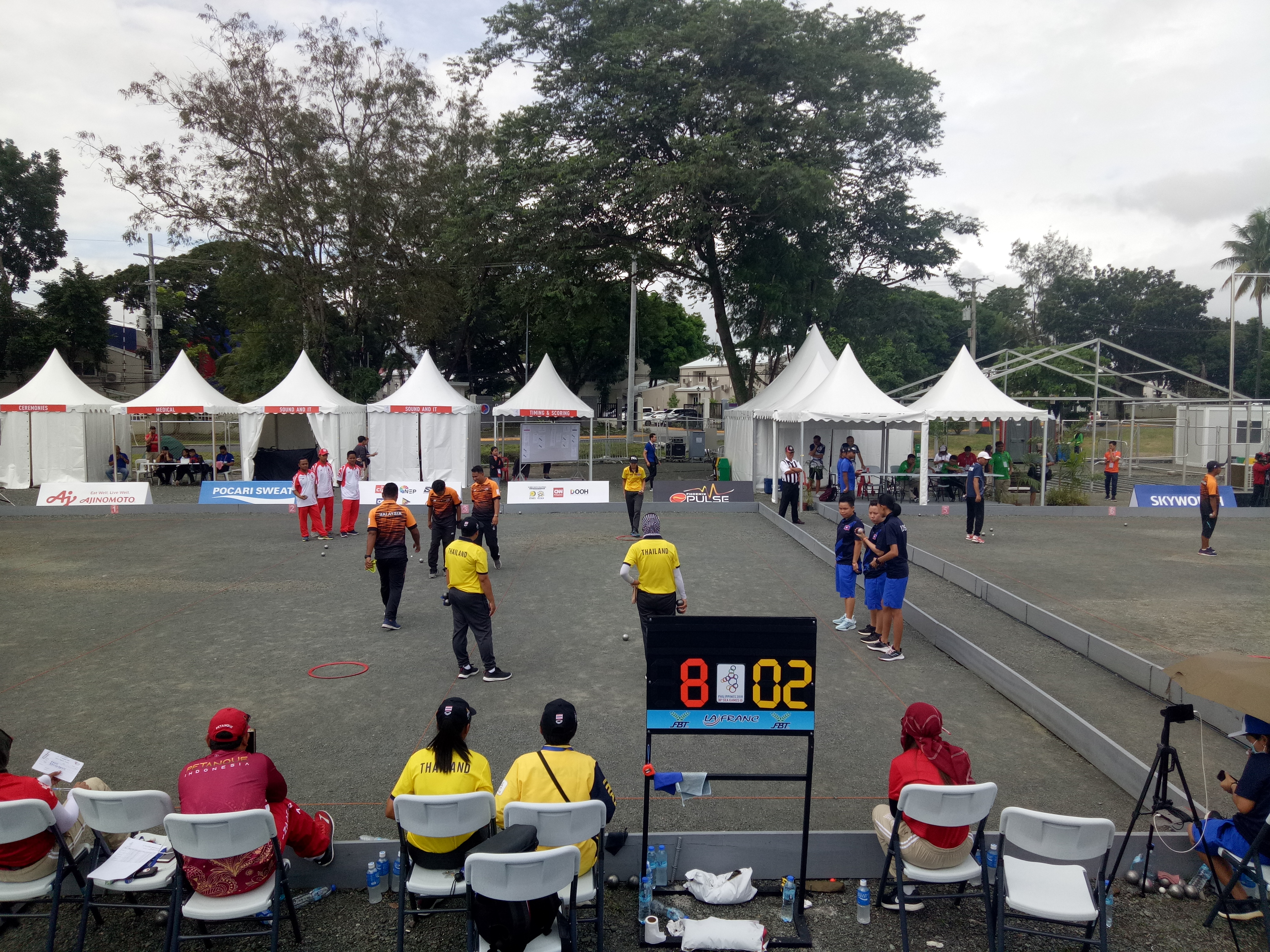
Thailand (yellow) vs Laos (navy blue) at the women's triples event.

Event	Gold	Silver	Bronze
Doubles	Thailand (THA); Phatipha Wongchuvej; Nantawan Fueangsanit	Laos (LAO); Sengchanphet Aly; Phanthaly Phetsamone	Malaysia (MAS); Sharifah Aqilah Farhana Syed Ali; Siti Asiah Zaini
Doubles	Thailand (THA); Phatipha Wongchuvej; Nantawan Fueangsanit	Laos (LAO); Sengchanphet Aly; Phanthaly Phetsamone	Vietnam (VIE); Nguyễn Thị Thuý Kiều; Thạch Thị Ánh Lan
Triples	Cambodia (CAM); Sreng Sorakhim; Khoun Yary; Duong Dina	Malaysia (MAS); Nurashimah Senin; Nur Farah Hana Musa; Sufiqriyani Edie	Laos (LAO); Khoun Souksavat; Manivanh Souliya; Bovilak Thepphakan
Triples	Cambodia (CAM); Sreng Sorakhim; Khoun Yary; Duong Dina	Malaysia (MAS); Nurashimah Senin; Nur Farah Hana Musa; Sufiqriyani Edie	Myanmar (MYA); Khin Cherry Thet; Tin Tin Wai; Aye Aye Nyein; Yin Yin Win Shein
