= Tennis at the 2019 SEA Games =

- Venue: Rizal Memorial Tennis Center
- Location: Manila, Philippines
- Dates: 1–7 December
- Nations: 11

Tennis was among the sports contested at the 2019 SEA Games and held at the Rizal Memorial Tennis Center in Manila. Five events were featured for tennis namely: men's singles, women's singles, men's doubles, women's doubles and mixed doubles.

== Medalists ==
Event	Gold	Silver	Bronze
Men's singles	Lý Hoàng Nam; Vietnam	Daniel Nguyen; Vietnam	Alberto Lim Jr. Philippines
Men's singles	Lý Hoàng Nam; Vietnam	Daniel Nguyen; Vietnam	Jeson Patrombon; Philippines
Women's singles	Aldila Sutjiadi; Indonesia	Savanna Lý-Nguyễn; Vietnam	Priska Madelyn Nugroho; Indonesia
Women's singles	Aldila Sutjiadi; Indonesia	Savanna Lý-Nguyễn; Vietnam	Anchisa Chanta; Thailand
Men's doubles	Philippines; Francis Alcantara; Jeson Patrombon	Philippines; Ruben Gonzales; Treat Huey	Vietnam; Daniel Nguyen; Nguyễn Văn Phương
Men's doubles	Philippines; Francis Alcantara; Jeson Patrombon	Philippines; Ruben Gonzales; Treat Huey	Vietnam; Lê Quốc Khánh; Lý Hoàng Nam
Women's doubles	Indonesia; Beatrice Gumulya; Jessy Rompies	Thailand; Peangtarn Plipuech; Tamarine Tanasugarn	Thailand; Patcharin Cheapchandej; Luksika Kumkhum
Women's doubles	Indonesia; Beatrice Gumulya; Jessy Rompies	Thailand; Peangtarn Plipuech; Tamarine Tanasugarn	Vietnam; Phan Thị Thanh Bình; Trần Thụy Thanh Trúc
Mixed doubles	Indonesia; Aldila Sutjiadi; Christopher Rungkat	Thailand; Tamarine Tanasugarn; Sanchai Ratiwatana	Indonesia; Beatrice Gumulya; David Agung Susanto
Mixed doubles	Indonesia; Aldila Sutjiadi; Christopher Rungkat	Thailand; Tamarine Tanasugarn; Sanchai Ratiwatana	Thailand; Patcharin Cheapchandej; Sonchat Ratiwatana

== Medal table ==
* Host nation (Philippines)

Rank	Nation	Gold	Silver	Bronze	Total
1	Indonesia (INA)	3	0	2	5
2	Vietnam (VIE)	1	2	3	6
3	Philippines (PHI)*	1	1	2	4
4	Thailand (THA)	0	2	3	5
Totals (4 entries)		5	5	10	20
