= Dancesport at the 2019 SEA Games =

- Venue: Royce Hotel and Casino
- Location: Mabalacat, Pampanga, Philippines
- Date: 1 December

Dancesport was held at the 2019 SEA Games in the Philippines and was contested at the Royce Hotel and Casino at the Clark Freeport Zone in Mabalacat, Pampanga on 1 December 2019.

No medals were awarded for women's breakdance due to only two competitors qualifying the event. This was the first dancesport event at the Southeast Asian Games since 2007.

== Medal table ==
* Host nation (Philippines)

| Rank | Nation | Gold | Silver | Bronze | Total |
|---|---|---|---|---|---|
| 1 | Philippines* | 10 | 2 | 0 | 12 |
| 2 | Vietnam | 2 | 7 | 2 | 11 |
| 3 | Malaysia | 1 | 0 | 0 | 1 |
| 4 | Thailand | 0 | 3 | 7 | 10 |
| 5 | Singapore | 0 | 1 | 4 | 5 |
| Totals (5 entries) | | 13 | 13 | 13 | 39 |

== Medalists ==
=== Standard ===
| Event | Gold | Silver | Bronze |
|---|---|---|---|
| Quickstep | Vietnam (VIE); Nguyễn Đức Hòa; Nguyễn Thị Hải Yến | Philippines (PHI); Mark Jayson Gayon; Mary Joy Renigen | Thailand (THA); Issarapong Duangkaew; Thanawan Yananun |
| Slow Foxtrot | Philippines (PHI); Mark Jayson Gayon; Mary Joy Renigen | Singapore (SGP); Jerome Teo; Rachel Teo | Thailand (THA); Issarapong Duangkaew; Thanawan Yananun |
| Tango | Philippines (PHI); Sean Mischa Aranar; Ana Leonila Nualla | Vietnam (VIE); Nguyễn Đức Hòa; Nguyễn Thị Hải Yến | Thailand (THA); Issarapong Duangkaew; Thanawan Yananun |
| Viennese Waltz | Philippines (PHI); Sean Mischa Aranar; Ana Leonila Nualla | Vietnam (VIE); Nguyễn Đức Hòa; Nguyễn Thị Hải Yến | Singapore (SGP); Jerome Teo; Rachel Teo |
| Waltz | Philippines (PHI); Mark Jayson Gayon; Mary Joy Renigen | Vietnam (VIE); Vũ Hoàng Anh Minh; Nguyễn Trường Xuân | Singapore (SGP); Jerome Teo; Rachel Teo |
| Five Dance | Philippines (PHI); Sean Mischa Aranar; Ana Leonila Nualla | Vietnam (VIE); Vũ Hoàng Anh Minh; Nguyễn Trường Xuân | Thailand (THA); Anucha Wijitkoon; Pasrapon Phandech |

=== Latin American ===
| Event | Gold | Silver | Bronze |
|---|---|---|---|
| Cha Cha Cha | Philippines (PHI); Wilbert Aunzo; Pearl Marie Cañeda | Thailand (THA); Jettapon Inthakun; Apichaya Kuptawanith | Vietnam (VIE); Nguyễn Trung Kiên; Phạm Hồng Anh |
| Jive | Vietnam (VIE); Nguyễn Đoàn Minh Trường; Nguyễn Trọng Nhã Uyên | Philippines (PHI); Michael Angelo Marquez; Stephanie Sabalo | Thailand (THA); Jettapon Inthakun; Apichaya Kuptawanith |
| Paso Doble | Philippines (PHI); Michael Angelo Marquez; Stephanie Sabalo | Thailand (THA); Shinawat Lerson; Preeyanoot Patoomsriwiroje | Singapore (SGP); Gary Tsan; Shannen Tan |
| Rumba | Philippines (PHI); Wilbert Aunzo; Pearl Marie Cañeda | Thailand (THA); Jettapon Inthakun; Apichaya Kuptawanith | Vietnam (VIE); Nguyễn Trung Kiên; Phạm Hồng Anh |
| Samba | Philippines (PHI); Wilbert Aunzo; Pearl Marie Cañeda | Vietnam (VIE); Nguyễn Đoàn Minh Trường; Nguyễn Trọng Nhã Uyên | Thailand (THA); Shinawat Lerson; Preeyanoot Patoomsriwiroje |
| Five Dance | Philippines (PHI); Michael Angelo Marquez; Stephanie Sabalo | Vietnam (VIE); Nguyễn Đoàn Minh Trường; Nguyễn Trọng Nhã Uyên | Thailand (THA); Shinawat Lerson; Preeyanoot Patoomsriwiroje |

=== Breaking ===
| Event | Gold | Silver | Bronze |
|---|---|---|---|
| Men's | Sam Jee Lek; Malaysia | Lê Hữu Phước; Vietnam | Jeremy Sim; Singapore |
| Women's^{1} | Dewi Desyana; Indonesia | Debbie Mahinay; Philippines | not awarded |

^1 Event was contested but no medals were awarded since there were only 2 competitors.
