= Shooting at the 2019 SEA Games =

- Venue: Philippine Marine Shooting Range
- Location: Lubao, Pampanga, Philippines
- Date: 2–10 December

The shooting competitions at the 2019 SEA Games in the Philippines were held at the Pradera Verde in Lubao, Pampanga.

== Medal table ==
* Host nation (Philippines)

Rank	Nation	Gold	Silver	Bronze	Total
1	Indonesia	7	6	2	15
2	Thailand	4	1	2	7
3	Philippines*	3	3	1	7
4	Malaysia	0	2	4	6
5	Singapore	0	1	4	5
6	Vietnam	0	1	1	2
Totals (6 entries)		14	14	14	42

== Medalists ==
=== Olympic shooting ===
Event	Gold	Silver	Bronze
Men's 10 m air pistol	Pongpol Kulchairattana; Thailand	Hoàng Xuân Vinh; Vietnam	Trần Quốc Cường; Vietnam
Women's 10 m air pistol	Natsara Champalat; Thailand	Bibiana Ng; Malaysia	Teo Shun Xie; Singapore
Men's 10 m air rifle	Napis Tortungpanich; Thailand	Fathur Gustafian; Indonesia	Mohamad Irwan Abdul Rahman; Singapore
Women's 10 m air rifle	Vidya Rafika Toyyiba; Indonesia	Ho Xiu Yi; Singapore	Adele Tan; Singapore
Mixed 10 m air rifle team	Indonesia; Fathur Gustafian; Vidya Rafika Toyyiba	Thailand; Napis Tortungpanich; Tararat Morakot	Singapore; Emmanuel Chan; Adele Tan
Men's trap	Savate Sresthaporn; Thailand	Carlos Carag; Philippines	Ong Chee Kheng; Malaysia
Men's trap team	Philippines; Eric Ang; Carlos Carag; Hagen Topacio	Malaysia; Chen Seong Fook; Ong Chee Kheng; Bernard Yeoh	Thailand; Yodchai Phachonyut; Savate Sresthaporn; Kornthawat Tadthongkam

=== Precision pistol competition ===
Event	Gold	Silver	Bronze
Men's individual	Rio Danu Utama Tjabu; Indonesia	Safrin Sihombing; Indonesia	Jantan Hintu; Malaysia
Women's individual	Marly Martir; Philippines	Pratiwi Kartikasari; Indonesia	Yusliana Mohd Yusof; Malaysia
Women's team	Philippines; Marly Martir; Franchette Shayne Quiroz; Elvie Baldivino	Indonesia; Pratiwi Kartikasari; Ayu Dini Fitriasih; Eva Triana	Malaysia; Yusliana Mohd Yusof; Azeera Abd Halim; Salzuriana Zubir

=== Metallic silhouette shooting ===
Event	Gold	Silver	Bronze
Air pistol	Agus Domosarjito; Indonesia	Totok Tri Martanto; Indonesia	Pisit Thapthinphat; Thailand
Air rifle	Ahmad Rifqi Mukhlisin; Indonesia	Aubrey Rasendriya; Indonesia	Diogenes Avila; Philippines

=== Benchrest shooting ===
Event	Gold	Silver	Bronze
Air rifle (light varmint)	Tirano Baja; Indonesia	Celedonio Tayao; Philippines	Wahyu Aji Putra; Indonesia
Air rifle (heavy varmint)	Fafan Khoirul Anwar; Indonesia	Ditto Nestor Dinopol; Philippines	Anung Satrio Wibowo; Indonesia
