= Wrestling at the 2019 SEA Games =

- Venue: Angeles University Foundation Sports and Cultural Center
- Location: Angeles City, Philippines
- Dates: 9–10 December

Wrestling at the 2019 SEA Games was held at the AUF Sports and Cultural Center, Angeles City, Philippines, from 9 to 10 December 2019.

== Medal table ==
* Host nation (Philippines)

Rank	NOCs	Gold	Silver	Bronze	Total
1	Vietnam (VIE)	12	2	0	14
2	Philippines (PHI)*	2	10	1	13
3	Thailand (THA)	0	2	10	12
4	Cambodia (CAM)	0	0	5	5
5	Laos (LAO)	0	0	3	3
5	Myanmar (MYA)	0	0	3	3
5	Singapore (SGP)	0	0	3	3
Totals (7 entries)		14	14	25	53

== Medalists ==
=== Men's Greco-Roman ===
Event	Gold	Silver	Bronze
55 kg	Nguyễn Đình Huy; Vietnam	Michael Vijay Cater; Philippines	Sahatsawat Phuangkaeo; Thailand
55 kg	Nguyễn Đình Huy; Vietnam	Michael Vijay Cater; Philippines	Myo Ko; Myanmar
60 kg	Bùi Tiến Hải; Vietnam	Margarito Angana Jr. Philippines	Wana Tun; Myanmar
60 kg	Bùi Tiến Hải; Vietnam	Margarito Angana Jr. Philippines	Nuttapong Hinmee; Thailand
63 kg	Noel Norada; Philippines	Nguyễn Công Thành; Vietnam	Eng Phanit; Cambodia
63 kg	Noel Norada; Philippines	Nguyễn Công Thành; Vietnam	Thanawat Khamhan; Thailand
72 kg	Jason Baucas; Philippines	Dương Hồng Phúc; Vietnam	Sengsavanh Phachanxay; Laos
77 kg	Nguyễn Bá Sơn; Vietnam	Apichai Natal; Thailand	Jefferson Manatad; Philippines
87 kg	Nghiêm Đình Hiếu; Vietnam	Jason Balabal; Philippines	Chanwit Aunjai; Thailand

=== Men's freestyle ===
Event	Gold	Silver	Bronze
57 kg	Nguyễn Văn Công; Vietnam	Alvin Lobreguito; Philippines	Jakkit Butjamrual; Thailand
57 kg	Nguyễn Văn Công; Vietnam	Alvin Lobreguito; Philippines	Soeun Sophors; Cambodia
61 kg	Nguyễn Hữu Định; Vietnam	Ronil Tubog; Philippines	Siripong Jampakam; Thailand
61 kg	Nguyễn Hữu Định; Vietnam	Ronil Tubog; Philippines	Yon Bunna; Cambodia
65 kg	Nguyễn Xuân Định; Vietnam	Jhonny Morte; Philippines	Saksit Janhom; Thailand
65 kg	Nguyễn Xuân Định; Vietnam	Jhonny Morte; Philippines	Chon Thoun; Cambodia
70 kg	Cấn Tất Dự; Vietnam	Joseph Angana; Philippines	Somsak Jindapan; Thailand
70 kg	Cấn Tất Dự; Vietnam	Joseph Angana; Philippines	Hong Yeow Lou; Singapore
125 kg	Hà Văn Hiếu; Vietnam	Puris Kaewkoed; Thailand	Dorn Sao; Cambodia
125 kg	Hà Văn Hiếu; Vietnam	Puris Kaewkoed; Thailand	Phetsoupahne Xaisomboun; Laos

=== Women's freestyle ===
Event	Gold	Silver	Bronze
50 kg	Nguyễn Thị Xuân; Vietnam	Jiah Pingot; Philippines	Kay Thi Khaing; Myanmar
50 kg	Nguyễn Thị Xuân; Vietnam	Jiah Pingot; Philippines	Manivanh Inthilath; Laos
55 kg	Kiều Thị Ly; Vietnam	Minalyn Foy-os; Philippines	Su Jun Yap; Singapore
55 kg	Kiều Thị Ly; Vietnam	Minalyn Foy-os; Philippines	Orasa Sookdongyor; Thailand
62 kg	Nguyễn Thị Mỹ Hạnh; Vietnam	Noemi Tener; Philippines	Salinee Srisombat; Thailand
62 kg	Nguyễn Thị Mỹ Hạnh; Vietnam	Noemi Tener; Philippines	Madeline Wee; Singapore
