= Jujitsu at the 2019 SEA Games =

- Venue: Laus Convention Centre
- Location: San Fernando, Pampanga, Philippines
- Date: 9–10 December
- Nations: 7

Jujitsu at the 2019 SEA Games was held at the Laus Convention Centre in San Fernando, Pampanga in the Philippines, from 9 to 10 December 2019.

== Participating nations ==
- Cambodia (4)
- Indonesia (7)
- Malaysia (4)
- Philippines (11)
- Singapore (9)
- Thailand (11)
- Vietnam (10)

== Medal table ==
* Host nation (Philippines)

Rank	Nation	Gold	Silver	Bronze	Total
1	Philippines (PHI)*	5	3	3	11
2	Thailand (THA)	2	2	6	10
3	Singapore (SGP)	2	1	4	7
4	Indonesia (INA)	1	2	1	4
5	Cambodia (CAM)	1	0	0	1
6	Vietnam (VIE)	0	2	6	8
7	Malaysia (MAS)	0	1	2	3
Totals (7 entries)		11	11	22	44

== Medalists ==
=== Men ===
Event	Gold	Silver	Bronze
56 kg	Carlo Angelo Peña; Philippines	Rengga Richard; Indonesia	Komkrit Keadnin; Thailand
56 kg	Carlo Angelo Peña; Philippines	Rengga Richard; Indonesia	Đào Hồng Sơn; Vietnam
62 kg	Noah Lim; Singapore	Suwijak Kuntong; Thailand	Cấn Văn Thắng; Vietnam
62 kg	Noah Lim; Singapore	Suwijak Kuntong; Thailand	Gian Taylor Dee; Philippines
69 kg	Banpot Lertthaisong; Thailand	Marc Alexander Lim; Philippines	Adam Akasyah; Malaysia
69 kg	Banpot Lertthaisong; Thailand	Marc Alexander Lim; Philippines	Paul Lim; Singapore
77 kg	Adrian Guggenheim; Philippines	Willy; Indonesia	Kwan Yan Wei; Singapore
77 kg	Adrian Guggenheim; Philippines	Willy; Indonesia	Rachata Ngamyoo; Thailand
85 kg	Dean Michael Roxas; Philippines	Benjamin Chia; Singapore	Hoàng Mạnh Tùng; Vietnam
85 kg	Dean Michael Roxas; Philippines	Benjamin Chia; Singapore	Sooknatee Suntra; Thailand
94 kg	Natdanai Netthip; Thailand	Joshua Luigi Ladera; Philippines	Yunus Junior Paays; Indonesia
94 kg	Natdanai Netthip; Thailand	Joshua Luigi Ladera; Philippines	Lê Duy Thành; Vietnam
120 kg	Muhammad Noor; Indonesia	Phanuphong Kitpongpanit; Thailand	Peter Lawrence Meimban; Philippines
120 kg	Muhammad Noor; Indonesia	Phanuphong Kitpongpanit; Thailand	Lưu Minh Thiện; Vietnam

=== Women ===
Event	Gold	Silver	Bronze
45 kg	Meggie Ochoa; Philippines	Đào Lê Thu Trang; Vietnam	Kanjutha Phattaraboonsorn; Thailand
45 kg	Meggie Ochoa; Philippines	Đào Lê Thu Trang; Vietnam	Ai Jin Lee; Malaysia
49 kg	Jessa Khan; Cambodia	Jenna Kaila Napolis; Philippines	Teh May Yong; Singapore
49 kg	Jessa Khan; Cambodia	Jenna Kaila Napolis; Philippines	Dương Thị Thanh Minh; Vietnam
55 kg	Annie Ramirez; Philippines	Cassandra Poyong; Malaysia	Fiona Toh; Singapore
55 kg	Annie Ramirez; Philippines	Cassandra Poyong; Malaysia	Onanong Sangsirichok; Thailand
62 kg	Constance Lien; Singapore	Nguyễn Ngọc Tú; Vietnam	Apryl Eppinger; Philippines
62 kg	Constance Lien; Singapore	Nguyễn Ngọc Tú; Vietnam	Orapa Senatham; Thailand
