= AUF Sports and Cultural Center =

University gymnasium in Angeles, Philippines

- AUF Gymnasium
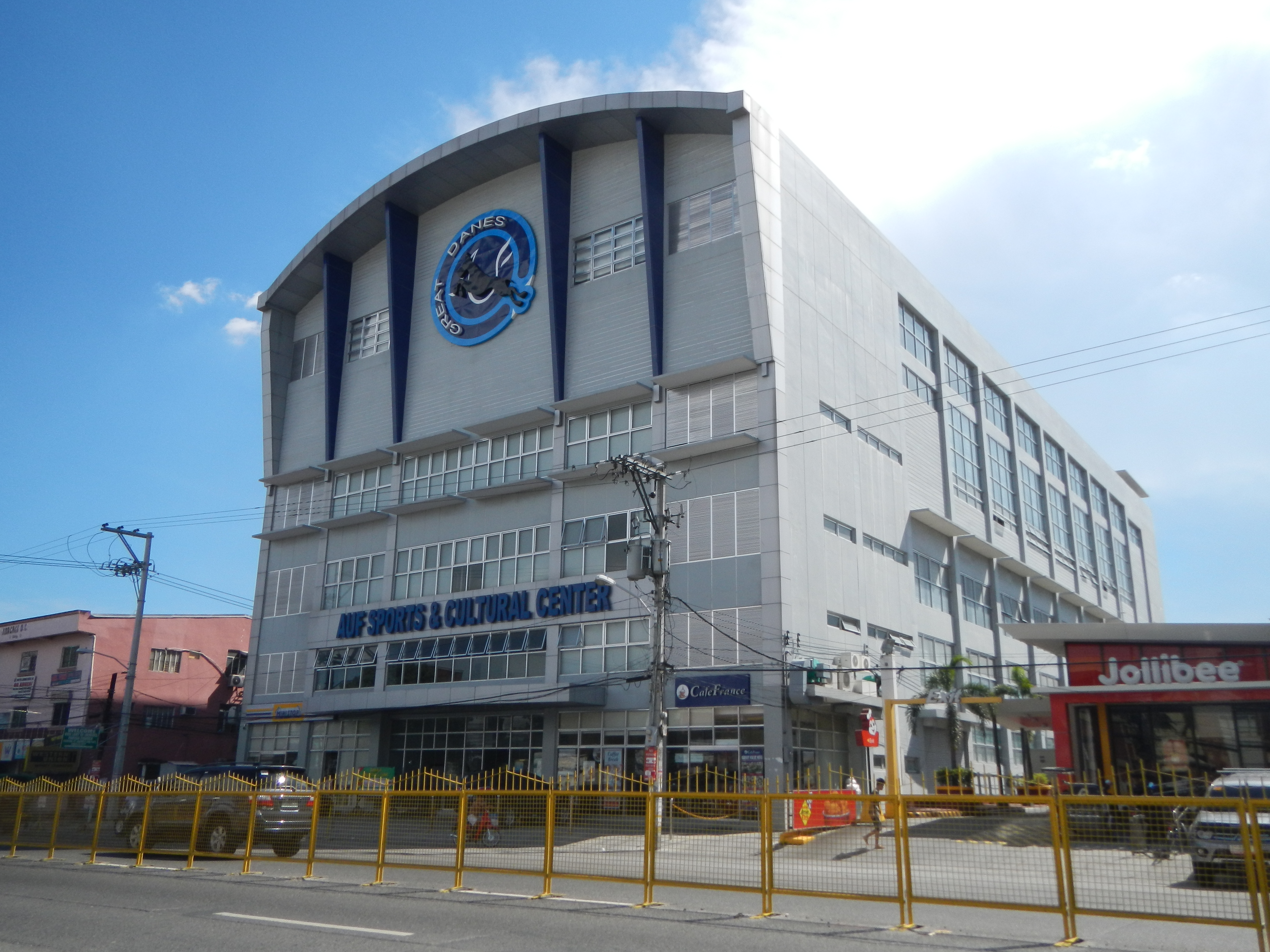
- Interactive map of AUF Sports and Cultural Center
- Full name: Angeles University Foundation Sports and Cultural Center
- Address: Angeles City; Philippines
- Location: Angeles University Foundation Main Campus
- Coordinates: 15°08′39.7″N 120°35′42.6″E
- Owner: Angeles University Foundation

Construction
- Opened: May 24, 2012
- Architects: Jose Siao Ling and Associates

Tenants
- AUF Great Danes; Philippine Basketball Association (bubble); Pampanga Giant Lanterns (MPBL) (2018–2020, 2024)

The AUF Sports and Cultural Center (AUF–SCC), also known as the AUF Gymnasium, is an indoor arena in Angeles, Philippines. Owned by the Angeles University Foundation, the venue has served various regional and international sports competitions.

== History ==
The AUF Sports and Cultural Center was built in 2012 for the Angeles University Foundation (AUF). Jose Siao Ling and Associates is the architecture firm responsible for its design. The construction of the facility was done under then-Acting AUF President Joseph Emmanuel Angeles. The venue inaugurated on May 24, 2012, eventually become a major venue for sports, cultural and social events in Central Luzon.

It was also one of the venues of the 2019 Southeast Asian Games which was hosted by the Philippines. It specifically hosted events in arnis, sambo, and wrestling.

The AUF Gymnasium during the COVID-19 pandemic hosted various tournaments under a bio-secure bubble set-up; this include the 2020 PBA Philippine Cup, and select groups of the 2021 FIBA Asia Cup qualifiers.

== Facilities ==
The AUF Sports and Cultural Center's basketball court is situated on the fourth floor.

== Tenants ==
The AUF Sports and Cultural Center hosts the Angeles University Foundation's varsity team, the Great Danes. It also hosts the Pampanga Giant Lanterns of the Maharlika Pilipinas Basketball League (MPBL) from 2018 to 2020 before moving to Bren Z. Guiao Convention Center in San Fernando. The Giant Lanterns will return to AUF for a home game in 2024. The Philippine Basketball Association (PBA) has occasionally used the venue for their "out-of-town" games prior to hosting a bubble tournament there in 2020.

== Events ==
- 2019 Southeast Asian Games (Arnis, Sambo, Wrestling)
- 2020 PBA Philippine Cup (Clark Bubble)
- 2021 FIBA Asia Cup qualification

Preceded by first venue	Home of the Pampanga Giant Lanterns; 2018–2020; 2024–present (secondary)	Succeeded by Bren Z. Guiao Convention Center
