= Duathlon at the 2019 SEA Games =

- Location: Subic, Philippines
- Dates: 2–5 December
- Nations: 6

The duathlon competition at the 2019 SEA Games in the Philippines was held at the Subic Bay Freeport Zone from 2 to 5 December 2019.

== Competition schedule ==
The men's and women's individual race took place on 2 December 2019. The mixed relay event was originally scheduled to take place on 4 December 2019 but was rescheduled to take place earlier on 2 December 2019 due to the anticipated weather caused by Typhoon Kanmuri (Tisoy).

All times are Philippine Standard Time (UTC+8).

Event	Date	Start time
Men's individual	2 December 2019	6:00
Women's individual	2 December 2019	8:00
Mixed relay	5 December 2019	8:00

== Medal summary ==
=== Medal table ===
* Host nation (Philippines)

Rank	Nation	Gold	Silver	Bronze	Total
1	Philippines (PHI)*	1	1	1	3
1	Thailand (THA)	1	1	1	3
3	Indonesia (INA)	1	0	0	1
4	Singapore (SIN)	0	1	0	1
5	Vietnam (VIE)	0	0	1	1
Totals (5 entries)		3	3	3	9

=== Events ===
Event	Gold	Silver	Bronze
Men's individual	Jauhari Johan; Indonesia	Joey Delos Reyes; Philippines	Nattawut Srinate; Thailand
Women's individual	Monica Torres; Philippines	Pareeya Sonsem; Thailand	Nguyễn Thị Phương Trinh; Vietnam
Mixed relay	Thailand; Pareeya Sonsem; Nattawut Srinate; Siriwan Kuncharin; Arthit Soda	Singapore; Emma Ada Middleditch; Ahmad Arif Ibrahim; Herlene Natasha Yu; Nicholas Rachmadi	Philippines; Monica Torres; Efraim Iñigo; Mary Pauline Fornea; Emmanuel Comendador

== Participating nations ==
A total of athletes from 6 nations were scheduled to participate (the numbers of athletes are shown in parentheses).

- Indonesia (8)
- Malaysia (7)
- Philippines (11)
- Singapore (5)
- Thailand (6)
- Vietnam (12)

== Results ==
=== Men's individual ===
Key

- Running denotes the time it took the athlete to complete the running leg
- Cycling denotes the time it took the athlete to complete the cycling leg
- Running denotes the time it took the athlete to complete the running leg
- Difference denotes the time difference between the athlete and the event winner
- * The total time includes both transitions

Rank	Duathlete	Country	Running	Cycling	Running	Total time	Difference
1st place, gold medalist(s)	Jauhari Johan	Indonesia	33:48	1:00:52	17:06	1:52:51	—
2nd place, silver medalist(s)	Joey Delos Reyes	Philippines	34:05	1:00:39	17:32	1:53.04	+0:13
3rd place, bronze medalist(s)	Nattawut Srinate	Thailand	34:04	1:00:43	17:29	1:53:05	+0:14
4	Lam Wai Kit	Singapore	33:50	1:02:22	17:31	1:54:38	+1:47
5	Jerwyn Banatao	Philippines	34:41	1:01:22	18:22	1:55:19	+2:28
6	Soda Arthit	Thailand	33:50	1:03:37	17:30	1:55:55	+3:04
7	Lim Kien Mau	Malaysia	34:35	1:02:53	18:01	1:56:27	+3:36
8	Cao Ngọc Hà	Vietnam	33:56	1:03:39	19:04	1:57:43	+4:52
9	Loh Chwan Chyin	Malaysia	34:42	1:02:51	19:45	1:58:21	+5:32
10	Foo Gen Lin	Singapore	33:51	1:10:17	18:19	2:03:18	+10:27
11	Nguyễn Tiến Hùng	Vietnam	34:44	1:09:44	19:11	2:04:17	+11:26
11	Kang Thoeurn	Cambodia	36:49	1:15:44	21:15	2:15:06	+22:15
Source: Official Results

=== Women's individual ===
Key

- Running denotes the time it took the athlete to complete the running leg
- Cycling denotes the time it took the athlete to complete the cycling leg
- Running denotes the time it took the athlete to complete the running leg
- Difference denotes the time difference between the athlete and the event winner
- * The total time includes both transitions

Rank	Duathlete	Country	Running	Cycling	Running	Total time	Difference
1st place, gold medalist(s)	Monica Torres	Philippines	38:16	1:08:23	20:56	2:08:44	—
2nd place, silver medalist(s)	Pareeya Sonsem	Thailand	40:08	1:10:24	19:47	2:11:18	+2:34
3rd place, bronze medalist(s)	Nguyễn Thị Phương Trinh	Vietnam	41:19	1:09:13	22:41	2:14:20	+5:36
4	Aoranuch Aiamtas	Thailand	38:17	1:17:06	20:06	2:16:36	+7:52
5	Eva Desiana	Indonesia	42:01	1:12:55	22:51	2:18:48	+10:04
6	Jelsie Sabado	Philippines	40:32	1:14:01	23:15	2:19:17	+10:33
7	Phoebe Kee	Singapore	43:45	1:14:01	23:11	2:21:59	+13:15
8	Mohammad Mariana	Malaysia	45:24	1:12:25	23:16	2:22:17	+13:33
9	Yee Phui Se	Malaysia	44:56	1:12:51	24:08	2:23:18	+14:34
10	Mok Ying Rong	Singapore	40:07	1:21:32	22:27	2:25:23	+16:39
11	Uon Chanpheaktra	Cambodia	46:48	1:20:16	26:50	2:34:52	+26:08
12	Ratana Phal	Cambodia	50:33	1:34:33	—	DNF	—
Source: Official Results

=== Mixed relay ===
Rank	Duathlete	Country	Leg 1	Leg 2	Leg 3	Leg 4	Total time	Difference
1st place, gold medalist(s)	Pareeya Sonsem; Nattawut Srinate; Siriwan Kuncharin; Arthit Soda	Thailand	22.29	20.46	23.52	21.41	1:27.68	—
2nd place, silver medalist(s)	Emma Ada Middleditch; Ahmad Arif Ibrahim; Herlene Natasha Yu; Nicholas Rachmadi	Singapore	22.43	20.55	23.27	23.11	1:29.36	+1.68
3rd place, bronze medalist(s)	Monica Torres; Efraim Inigo; Mary Pauline Fornea; Emmanuel Comendador	Philippines	23.07	21.42	24.35	22.11	1:30.95	+3.27
4	Nguyễn Thị Phương Trinh; Cao Ngọc Hà; Nguyễn Thị Kim Tuyến; Nguyễn Tiến Hùng	Vietnam	24.08	21.41	25.45	22.39	1:33.33	+5.65
5	Yee Phui Se; Xian Chong; Yeong Zhen Yi; Muhammad Haziq Junaidy	Malaysia	26.41	21.20	24.31	22.46	1:34.38	+6.70
