= Kurash at the 2019 SEA Games =

- Venue: LausGroup Event Centre
- Location: San Fernando, Pampanga, Philippines
- Date: 1–2 December
- Competitors: 43 from 7 nations

The kurash competitions at the 2019 SEA Games in Philippines were held at the LausGroup Event Centre in San Fernando, Pampanga between 1 and 2 December 2019.

== Medal table ==
* Host nation (Philippines)

Rank	Nation	Gold	Silver	Bronze	Total
1	Vietnam (VIE)	7	1	2	10
2	Thailand (THA)	2	2	4	8
3	Philippines (PHI)*	1	2	5	8
4	Indonesia (INA)	0	3	3	6
5	Malaysia (MAS)	0	1	0	1
5	Singapore (SGP)	0	1	0	1
7	Myanmar (MYA)	0	0	1	1
Totals (7 entries)		10	10	15	35

== Medalists ==
=== Men ===
Event	Gold	Silver	Bronze
66 kg	Lê Đức Đông; Vietnam	Songwuti Kaewpinit; Thailand	Al Rolan Llamas; Philippines
66 kg	Lê Đức Đông; Vietnam	Songwuti Kaewpinit; Thailand	Hendi Hadiat; Indonesia
73 kg	Vũ Ngọc Sơn; Vietnam	Joel Tseng; Singapore	Natee Chokchiewchan; Thailand
73 kg	Vũ Ngọc Sơn; Vietnam	Joel Tseng; Singapore	Lloyd Dennis Catipon; Philippines
81 kg	Bùi Minh Quân; Vietnam	I Komang Adiarta; Indonesia	Nopphasit Lertsirisombut; Thailand
90 kg	Trần Thương; Vietnam	Fakhrul Adam Fauzi Cruz; Malaysia	Rick Jayson Senales; Philippines
+90 kg	Kunathip Yea-on; Thailand	Lê Đình Vũ; Vietnam	Peter Taslim; Indonesia
+90 kg	Kunathip Yea-on; Thailand	Lê Đình Vũ; Vietnam	Zin Myint; Myanmar

=== Women ===
Event	Gold	Silver	Bronze
52 kg	Hoàng Thị Tình; Vietnam	Maria Magdalena Ince; Indonesia	Wanida Raksat; Thailand
52 kg	Hoàng Thị Tình; Vietnam	Maria Magdalena Ince; Indonesia	Helen Dawa; Philippines
57 kg	Saowalak Homklin; Thailand	Jenielou Mosqueda; Philippines	Đồng Thị Thu Hiền; Vietnam
63 kg	Estie Gay Liwanen; Philippines	Khasani Nazmu Shifa; Indonesia	Prapathip Narkkarach; Thailand
63 kg	Estie Gay Liwanen; Philippines	Khasani Nazmu Shifa; Indonesia	Nguyễn Thị Hương; Vietnam
70 kg	Nguyễn Thị Lan; Vietnam	Bianca Mae Estrella; Philippines	Siti Latifah; Indonesia
+70 kg	Trần Thị Thanh Thủy; Vietnam	Pattamaporn Tubkit; Thailand	Sydney Sy; Philippines
