= Judo at the 2019 SEA Games =

- Venue: Laus Group Event Center
- Location: San Fernando, Pampanga, Philippines
- Date: 4–7 December
- Competitors: 16 from 8 nations

Judo competitions at the 2019 SEA Games were held at the Laus Group Event Center from 4 to 7 December 2019.

== Participating nations ==
A total of 110 athletes from 9 nations participated (the numbers of athletes are shown in parentheses).

- Cambodia (6)
- Indonesia (16)
- Laos (10)
- Malaysia (8)
- Myanmar (10)
- Philippines (25)
- Singapore (5)
- Thailand (14)
- Vietnam (16)

== Medal table ==
* Host nation (Philippines)

Rank	Nation	Gold	Silver	Bronze	Total
1	Thailand (THA)	7	2	3	12
2	Indonesia (INA)	4	2	4	10
3	Philippines (PHI)*	3	1	9	13
4	Vietnam (VIE)	2	4	4	10
5	Myanmar (MYA)	0	2	3	5
6	Laos (LAO)	0	2	1	3
7	Malaysia (MAS)	0	2	0	2
8	Singapore (SGP)	0	1	2	3
Totals (8 entries)		16	16	26	58

== Medalists ==
=== Kata ===
Event	Gold	Silver	Bronze
Men's nage-no kata	Thailand; Sangob Sasipongan; Pongthep Tumrongluk	Laos; Chindavon Syvanevilay; Phisath Sisaketh	Myanmar; Chit Min Min Ko; Maing San
Women's jū-no kata	Thailand; Pitima Thaweerattanasinp; Suphattra Jaikhumkao	Laos; Mayouly Phanouvong; Phonevan Syamphone	Vietnam; Trần Lê Phương Nga; Nguyễn Thị Bảo Ngọc

=== Men's combat ===
Event	Gold	Silver	Bronze
66 kg	Shugen Nakano; Philippines	Budi Prasetiyo; Indonesia	Aung Zayar Tun; Myanmar
66 kg	Shugen Nakano; Philippines	Budi Prasetiyo; Indonesia	Surasak Puntanam; Thailand
73 kg	Iksan Apriyadi; Indonesia	Nguyễn Tấn Công; Vietnam	Ace Ang; Singapore
73 kg	Iksan Apriyadi; Indonesia	Nguyễn Tấn Công; Vietnam	Keisei Nakano; Philippines
81 kg	Masayuki Terada; Thailand	Gilbert Ramirez; Philippines	Xayasan Chittakon; Laos
90 kg	Lê Anh Tài; Vietnam	Kittipong Hantratin; Thailand	Carl Dave Aseneta; Philippines
90 kg	Lê Anh Tài; Vietnam	Kittipong Hantratin; Thailand	Aaron Ng; Singapore
100 kg	Gede Ganding Kalbu Soethama; Indonesia	Low Yilong; Singapore	John Viron Ferrer; Philippines
100 kg	Gede Ganding Kalbu Soethama; Indonesia	Low Yilong; Singapore	Wei Puyang; Thailand
+100 kg	I Gede Agastya Darma Wardana; Indonesia	Muhammad Ruzaini Abdul Razak; Malaysia	Shin Matsumura; Philippines
+100 kg	I Gede Agastya Darma Wardana; Indonesia	Muhammad Ruzaini Abdul Razak; Malaysia	Nguyễn Châu Hoàng Lân; Vietnam
Team	Thailand; Kittipong Hantratin; Prasit Poolklang; Surasak Puntanam; Wei Puyang; Masayuki Terada	Vietnam; Bùi Thiện Hoàng; Lê Khắc Nhân; Nguyễn Châu Hoàng Lân; Nguyễn Hải Bá; Nguyễn Tấn Công; Phan Vũ Nam	Indonesia; Budi Prasetiyo; Gede Ganding Kalbu Soethama; Gregory Ignacito Jeremy; I Gede Agastya Darma Wardana; I Kadek Pasek Karisna; Iksan Apriyadi
Team	Thailand; Kittipong Hantratin; Prasit Poolklang; Surasak Puntanam; Wei Puyang; Masayuki Terada	Vietnam; Bùi Thiện Hoàng; Lê Khắc Nhân; Nguyễn Châu Hoàng Lân; Nguyễn Hải Bá; Nguyễn Tấn Công; Phan Vũ Nam	Philippines; Carl Dave Aseneta; Lloyd Dennis Catipon; Jackielou Agon Escarpe; John Viron Ferrer; Shin Matsumura; Daryl Mercado; Kodo Nakano; Bryan Quillotes; Rick Jayson Senales; Marco Tumampad

=== Women's combat ===
Event	Gold	Silver	Bronze
52 kg	Kachakorn Warasiha; Thailand	Khin Khin Su; Myanmar	Khrizzie Pabulayan; Philippines
52 kg	Kachakorn Warasiha; Thailand	Khin Khin Su; Myanmar	Nguyễn Thị Thanh Thủy; Vietnam
57 kg	Ni Kadek Anny Pandini; Indonesia	Nguyễn Thị Bích Ngọc; Vietnam	Rena Furukawa; Philippines
63 kg	Kiyomi Watanabe; Philippines	Nik Norlydiawati Nik Azman; Malaysia	Noe Wai Chu Myat; Myanmar
70 kg	Mariya Takahashi; Philippines	Surattana Thongsri; Thailand	I Gusti Ayu Putu Guna Kakihara; Indonesia
78 kg	Ikumi Oeda; Thailand	Aye Aye Aung; Myanmar	Tiara Arta Garthia; Indonesia
78 kg	Ikumi Oeda; Thailand	Aye Aye Aung; Myanmar	Võ Thị Phương Quỳnh; Vietnam
+78 kg	Thonthan Satjadet; Thailand	Nguyễn Thị Như Ý Vietnam	Ryoko Salinas; Philippines
+78 kg	Thonthan Satjadet; Thailand	Nguyễn Thị Như Ý Vietnam	I Dewa Ayu Mira Widari; Indonesia
Team	Vietnam; Hà Thị Nga; Hồ Thị Như Vân; Nguyễn Ngọc Diễm Phương; Nguyễn Thị Diệu Tiên; Nguyễn Thị Thanh Thủy	Indonesia; Amanah Nur Istiqomah; I Dewa Ayu Mira Widari; I Gusti Ayu Putu Guna Kakihara; Ni Kadek Anny Pandini; Syerina; Tiara Arta Garthia	Thailand; Ikumi Oeda; Surattana Thongsri; Kachakorn Warasiha; Yuriko Warasiha
Team	Vietnam; Hà Thị Nga; Hồ Thị Như Vân; Nguyễn Ngọc Diễm Phương; Nguyễn Thị Diệu Tiên; Nguyễn Thị Thanh Thủy	Indonesia; Amanah Nur Istiqomah; I Dewa Ayu Mira Widari; I Gusti Ayu Putu Guna Kakihara; Ni Kadek Anny Pandini; Syerina; Tiara Arta Garthia	Philippines; Megumi Delgado; Ma. Jeanalane Lopez; Jenielou Mosqueda; Khrizzie Pabulayan; Ryoko Salinas; Mariya Takahashi; Kiyomi Watanabe
