= Sambo at the 2019 SEA Games =

- Venue: AUF Sports and Cultural Center
- Location: Angeles City, Philippines
- Date: 5–6 December

Sambo competitions at the 2019 Southeast Asian Games were held at the AUF Sports and Cultural Center, Angeles City, Philippines between 5 and 6 December 2019.

The martial art was first introduced in this edition of the SEA Games.

== Medal table ==
* Host nation (Philippines)

Rank	Nation	Gold	Silver	Bronze	Total
1	Indonesia (INA)	4	1	2	7
2	Philippines (PHI)*	2	1	3	6
3	Singapore (SGP)	1	2	3	6
4	Thailand (THA)	0	2	5	7
5	Malaysia (MAS)	0	1	0	1
6	Vietnam (VIE)	0	0	1	1
Totals (6 entries)		7	7	14	28

== Medalists ==
=== Sport ===
Event	Gold	Silver	Bronze
Men's 82 kg	Chino Sy Tancontian; Philippines	Gary Chow; Singapore	Sonram Jenghor; Thailand
Men's 82 kg	Chino Sy Tancontian; Philippines	Gary Chow; Singapore	Rio Akbar Bahari; Indonesia
Women's 80 kg	Ridha Wahdaniyaty Ridwan; Indonesia	Chatthayaporn Prawiset; Thailand	Cassiopeia Lim Wan Kee; Singapore
Women's 80 kg	Ridha Wahdaniyaty Ridwan; Indonesia	Chatthayaporn Prawiset; Thailand	Dương Thị Quỳnh Như; Vietnam

=== Combat ===
Event	Gold	Silver	Bronze
Men's 57 kg	Fajar; Indonesia	Rene Catalan; Philippines	Tang Yong Siang; Singapore
Men's 57 kg	Fajar; Indonesia	Rene Catalan; Philippines	Ritthodecha Chatchai; Thailand
Men's 74 kg	Mark Striegl; Philippines	Ashvin Jaswant Singh; Singapore	Deni Arif Fadhillah; Indonesia
Men's 74 kg	Mark Striegl; Philippines	Ashvin Jaswant Singh; Singapore	Arthit Khuansathan; Thailand
Men's 82 kg	Muhammad Nazri Sutari; Singapore	Jason Fitono Sim; Indonesia	Patrick Manicad; Philippines
Men's 82 kg	Muhammad Nazri Sutari; Singapore	Jason Fitono Sim; Indonesia	Wajana Kiew-on; Thailand
Men's 90 kg	Senie Kristian; Indonesia	Izzat Afandi; Malaysia	Jose Rene Mondejar III; Philippines
Men's 90 kg	Senie Kristian; Indonesia	Izzat Afandi; Malaysia	Natthapong Leepaiboon; Thailand

=== Team ===
Event	Gold	Silver	Bronze
Mixed	Indonesia (INA); Desiana Syafitri; Emma Ramadinah; Erik Gustam; Rio Akbar Bahari	Thailand (THA); Sasipilai Chaisang; Supattra Nanong; Arthit Khuansathan; Sonram Jenghor; Natthapong Leepaiboon	Philippines (PHI); Helen Aclopen; Mariane Mariano; Jedd Andre Kim; Renzo Cazeñas; Patrick Dos Santos
Mixed	Indonesia (INA); Desiana Syafitri; Emma Ramadinah; Erik Gustam; Rio Akbar Bahari	Thailand (THA); Sasipilai Chaisang; Supattra Nanong; Arthit Khuansathan; Sonram Jenghor; Natthapong Leepaiboon	Singapore (SGP); Sarah Yong; Ryan Tay; Gary Chow; Timothy Loh
