= Arnis at the 2019 SEA Games =

- Venue: AUF Sports and Cultural Center
- Location: Angeles City
- Dates: 1–3 December
- Nations: 4

Arnis at the 2019 SEA Games in the Philippines was held at the AUF Sports and Cultural Center in Angeles City from 1 to 3 December 2019.

== Participating nations ==
Four nations participated in arnis.

- Cambodia
- Myanmar
- Philippines
- Vietnam

== Results ==
=== Men ===
==== Livestick ====
Event	Gold	Silver	Bronze
Bantamweight	Dexler Bolambao; Philippines	Paing Soe; Myanmar	Nget Deb; Cambodia
Bantamweight	Dexler Bolambao; Philippines	Paing Soe; Myanmar	Nguyễn Ngọc Đạt; Vietnam
Featherweight	Niño Mark Talledo; Philippines	Vũ Văn Kiên; Vietnam	Sok Chhun; Cambodia
Featherweight	Niño Mark Talledo; Philippines	Vũ Văn Kiên; Vietnam	Paing Win Thet; Myanmar
Lightweight	Villardo Cunamay; Philippines	Yong Mengly; Cambodia	Thet Naing Oo; Myanmar
Lightweight	Villardo Cunamay; Philippines	Yong Mengly; Cambodia	Vũ Đức Hùng; Vietnam
Welterweight	Mike Bañares; Philippines	Phú Thái Việt; Vietnam	Moeun Bunly; Cambodia
Welterweight	Mike Bañares; Philippines	Phú Thái Việt; Vietnam	Van Lian Khawl; Myanmar

==== Padded stick ====
Event	Gold	Silver	Bronze
Bantamweight	Jesfer Huquire; Philippines	Văn Công Quốc; Vietnam	Nget Deb; Cambodia
Bantamweight	Jesfer Huquire; Philippines	Văn Công Quốc; Vietnam	Nay Linn Oo; Myanmar
Featherweight	Elmer Manlapas; Philippines	Nguyễn Đức Trí; Vietnam	Sok Chhun; Cambodia
Featherweight	Elmer Manlapas; Philippines	Nguyễn Đức Trí; Vietnam	Ko Tin; Myanmar
Lightweight	Yong Mengly; Cambodia	Billy Joey Valenzuela; Philippines	Aung Khaing Linn; Myanmar
Lightweight	Yong Mengly; Cambodia	Billy Joey Valenzuela; Philippines	Vũ Đức Hùng; Vietnam
Welterweight	Carloyd Tejada; Philippines	Vương Thanh Tùng; Vietnam	Moeun Bunly; Cambodia
Welterweight	Carloyd Tejada; Philippines	Vương Thanh Tùng; Vietnam	Kyaw Thurain Tun; Myanmar

==== Anyo ====
Event	Gold	Silver	Bronze
Non-traditional Open Weapon	Crisamuel Delfin; Philippines	Ngô Văn Huỳnh; Vietnam	Chhem Sila; Cambodia
Non-traditional Open Weapon	Crisamuel Delfin; Philippines	Ngô Văn Huỳnh; Vietnam	Yar Zar Tun; Myanmar
Traditional Open Weapon	Đỗ Đức Trí; Vietnam	Mark David Puzon; Philippines	Chhem Sila; Cambodia
Traditional Open Weapon	Đỗ Đức Trí; Vietnam	Mark David Puzon; Philippines	Be Be Kyaw Aung; Myanmar

=== Women ===
==== Livestick ====
Event	Gold	Silver	Bronze
Bantamweight	Jezebel Morcillo; Philippines	Nguyễn Thị Hương; Vietnam	Khiev Chendaroth; Cambodia
Bantamweight	Jezebel Morcillo; Philippines	Nguyễn Thị Hương; Vietnam	Thandar Khing; Myanmar
Featherweight	Vũ Thị Thanh Bình; Vietnam	Jude Oliver Rodriguez; Philippines	Yuos Sanchana; Cambodia
Featherweight	Vũ Thị Thanh Bình; Vietnam	Jude Oliver Rodriguez; Philippines	Hla Nwe Aye; Myanmar
Lightweight	Đào Thị Hồng Nhung; Vietnam	Si Veannsonita; Cambodia	Moe Moe Aye; Myanmar
Lightweight	Đào Thị Hồng Nhung; Vietnam	Si Veannsonita; Cambodia	Eza Rai Yalong; Philippines
Welterweight	Nguyễn Thị Cẩm Nhi; Vietnam	Thet Wai Oo; Myanmar	Bo Chanthy; Cambodia
Welterweight	Nguyễn Thị Cẩm Nhi; Vietnam	Thet Wai Oo; Myanmar	Erlin Mae Busacay; Philippines

==== Padded stick ====
Event	Gold	Silver	Bronze
Bantamweight	Sheena Del Monte; Philippines	Nguyễn Thị Hương; Vietnam	Khiev Chendaroth; Cambodia
Bantamweight	Sheena Del Monte; Philippines	Nguyễn Thị Hương; Vietnam	Wut Yae Cho; Myanmar
Featherweight	Jedah Mae Soriano; Philippines	Maw Maw Oo; Myanmar	Yuos Sanchana; Cambodia
Featherweight	Jedah Mae Soriano; Philippines	Maw Maw Oo; Myanmar	Đoàn Thị Nhuần; Vietnam
Lightweight	Ross Ashley Monville; Philippines	Moe Moe Aye; Myanmar	Si Veannsonita; Cambodia
Lightweight	Ross Ashley Monville; Philippines	Moe Moe Aye; Myanmar	Lê Thị Vân Anh; Vietnam
Welterweight	Abegail Abad; Philippines	Nguyễn Thị Cúc; Vietnam	Bo Chanthy; Cambodia
Welterweight	Abegail Abad; Philippines	Nguyễn Thị Cúc; Vietnam	L Sheilar Min Naing; Myanmar

==== Anyo ====
Event	Gold	Silver	Bronze
Non-traditional Open Weapon	Mary Allin Aldeguer; Philippines	Triệu Thị Hoài; Vietnam	Eng Sou Mala; Cambodia
Non-traditional Open Weapon	Mary Allin Aldeguer; Philippines	Triệu Thị Hoài; Vietnam	L Sheilar Min Naing; Myanmar
Traditional Open Weapon	Eian Dray Phoo; Myanmar	Ryssa Jezzel Sanchez; Philippines	Eng Sou Mala; Cambodia
Traditional Open Weapon	Eian Dray Phoo; Myanmar	Ryssa Jezzel Sanchez; Philippines	Nguyễn Phương Linh; Vietnam

== Medal table ==
* Host nation (Philippines)

Rank	nation	Gold	Silver	Bronze	Total
1	Philippines*	14	4	2	20
2	Vietnam	4	10	6	20
3	Myanmar	1	4	15	20
4	Cambodia	1	2	17	20
Totals (4 entries)		20	20	40	80
