= Napis Tortungpanich =

Thai sports shooter (born 1995)

Personal information
- Born: 29 March 1995 (age 31)

Sport
- Sport: Sport shooting
Medal record
Men's Shooting
Representing Thailand
Asian Airgun Championships
Gold medal – first place	2021 Shymkent	10 m air rifle mixed team
Silver medal – second place	2021 Shymkent	10 m air rifle
Southeast Asian Games
Gold medal – first place	2013 Myanmar	50 m rifle prone team
Gold medal – first place	2015 Singapore	10 m air rifle team
Gold medal – first place	2017 Kuala Lumpur	50 m rifle 3 positions
Gold medal – first place	2019 Philippines	10 m air rifle
Silver medal – second place	2011 Palembang	50 m rifle 3 positions
Silver medal – second place	2013 Myanmar	50 m rifle prone
Silver medal – second place	2015 Singapore	10 m air rifle
Silver medal – second place	2019 Philippines	10 m air rifle Mixed
Bronze medal – third place	2017 Kuala Lumpur	10 m air rifle

Napis Tortungpanich (born 29 March 1995) is a Thai sport shooter. He competed in the men's 10 metre air rifle event at the 2016 Summer Olympics.
