= Golf at the 2019 SEA Games =

- Venue: Luisita Golf and Country Club
- Location: Tarlac City
- Date: 4–8 December
- Competitors: 55 from 10 nations

Golf competitions at the 2019 SEA Games in the Philippines were held at the Luisita Golf and Country Club in Tarlac City from 4 to 8 December 2019.

== Medal summary ==
=== Medal table ===
* Host nation (Philippines)

| Rank | Nation | Gold | Silver | Bronze | Total |
|---|---|---|---|---|---|
| 1 | Philippines* | 2 | 0 | 1 | 3 |
| 2 | Thailand | 1 | 2 | 3 | 6 |
| 3 | Singapore | 1 | 1 | 0 | 2 |
| 4 | Malaysia | 0 | 1 | 0 | 1 |
| Totals (4 entries) | | 4 | 4 | 4 | 12 |

=== Medalists ===
| Event | Gold | Silver | Bronze |
|---|---|---|---|
| Men's individual | James Leow Kwang Aik; Singapore | Tanapat Pichaikool; Thailand | Nopparat Panichphol; Thailand |
| Men's team | Thailand; Vanchai Luangnitikul; Nopparat Panichphol; Tanapat Pichaikool | Singapore; Nicklaus Chiam; Hiroshi Tai; James Leow Kwang Aik | Philippines; Luis Castro; Aidric Jose Chan; Sean Ramos |
| Women's individual | Bianca Pagdanganan; Philippines | Kan Bunnabodee; Thailand | Pimnipa Panthong; Thailand |
| Women's team | Philippines; Lois Kaye Go; Bianca Pagdanganan | Malaysia; Ashley Lau Jen Wen; Natasha Andrea Oon | Thailand; Kan Bunnabodee; Atthaya Thitikul |
