= Vietnam at the 2019 SEA Games =

Vietnam at the 2019 Southeast Asian Games
- IOC code: VIE
- NOC: Vietnam Olympic Committee
- Website: www.voc.org.vn (in Vietnamese and English)

in Philippines
- Competitors: 856 in 43 sports
- Flag bearer: Vũ Thành An
- Medals Ranked 2nd: Gold 98 Silver 85 Bronze 105 Total 288

Southeast Asian Games appearances (overview)
- 1989; 1991; 1993; 1995; 1997; 1999; 2001; 2003; 2005; 2007; 2009; 2011; 2013; 2015; 2017; 2019; 2021; 2023; 2025; 2027; 2029

Vietnam participated at the 2019 Southeast Asian Games in Philippines from November 30 to December 11, 2019.

== Medal summary ==
=== Medal by sports ===
Medals by sports
Sport	1st place, gold medalist(s)	2nd place, silver medalist(s)	3rd place, bronze medalist(s)	Total	Rank
Archery	3	2	1	6	1
Arnis	4	10	6	20	2
Athletics	16	12	10	38	1
Badminton	0	0	0	0	–
Basketball	0	0	2	2	4
Beach handball	1	0	0	1	1
Billiards and Snooker	1	3	1	5	3
Bowling	0	0	0	0	–
Boxing	1	5	2	8	3
Canoeing	2	0	3	5	2
Chess	0	2	3	5	5
Cycling	2	1	0	3	3
Dancesport	2	7	2	11	2
Diving	0	0	1	1	4
Duathlon	0	0	1	1	5
Esports	0	0	3	3	6
Fencing	4	2	4	10	2
Football	2	0	0	2	1
Golf	0	0	0	0	–
Gymnastics – Aerobics	3	0	0	3	1
Gymnastics – Artistic	3	2	7	12	2
Judo	2	4	4	10	4
Jujitsu	0	2	6	8	6
Karate	2	3	6	11	3
Kayaking	0	1	0	1	2
Kickboxing	4	0	2	6	1
Kurash	7	1	2	10	1
Muaythai	1	1	3	5	4
Open water swimming	1	1	0	2	1
Pencak silat	1	1	2	4	6
Pétanque	0	0	2	2	5
Rowing	0	3	1	4	3
Sailing	0	0	0	0	–
Sambo	0	0	1	1	6
Sepak takraw	0	1	2	3	6
Shooting	0	1	1	2	6
Skateboarding	0	0	0	0	–
Surfing	0	0	0	0	–
Swimming	10	6	9	25	2
Table tennis	1	0	0	1	3
Taekwondo	5	2	7	14	3
Tennis	1	2	3	6	2
Triathlon	0	0	0	0	–
Volleyball	0	1	0	1	3
Weightlifting	4	5	1	10	1
Wrestling	12	2	0	14	1
Wushu	3	2	7	12	2
Total	98	85	105	288	2/11

=== Medal by dates ===
Medals by dates
Day	Date	1st place, gold medalist(s)	2nd place, silver medalist(s)	3rd place, bronze medalist(s)	Total
1	1 December	10	13	7	30
2	2 December	5	7	6	18
3	3 December	8	7	10	25
4	4 December	4	5	5	14
5	5 December	4	4	7	15
6	6 December	7	5	11	23
7	7 December	8	9	12	29
8	8 December	20	9	4	33
9	9 December	14	19	7	40
10	10 December	17	7	10	34
11	11 December	1	0	0	1
Total		98	85	105	288

=== Medallists ===
Medal	Name	Sport	Event	Date
Gold	Lộc Thị Đào	Archery	Recurve – Women's individual	8 December 2019
Gold	Lộc Thị Đào; Đỗ Thị Ánh Nguyệt; Hà Thị Ngọc	Archery	Recurve – Women's team	8 December 2019
Gold	Lộc Thị Đào; Nguyễn Hoàng Phi Vũ	Archery	Recurve – Mixed team	8 December 2019
Gold	Đỗ Đức Trí	Arnis	Men's Anyo – Traditional open weapon	3 December 2019
Gold	Vũ Thị Thanh Bình	Arnis	Women's Livestick – Featherweight	1 December 2019
Gold	Đào Thi Hồng Nhung	Arnis	Women's Livestick – Featherweight	1 December 2019
Gold	Nguyễn Thị Cẩm Nhi	Arnis	Women's Livestick – Featherweight	1 December 2019
Gold	Trần Nhật Hoàng	Athletics	Men's 400m	8 December 2019
Gold	Dương Văn Thái	Athletics	Men's 1500m	8 December 2019
Gold	Dương Văn Thái	Athletics	Men's 800m	9 December 2019
Gold	Đỗ Quốc Luật	Athletics	Men's 3000m steeplechase	10 December 2019
Gold	Quách Công Lịch; Lương Văn Thao; Trần Đình Sơn; Trần Nhật Hoàng	Athletics	Men's 4x400m relay	10 December 2019
Gold	Lê Tú Chinh	Athletics	Women's 100m	8 December 2019
Gold	Đinh Thị Bích	Athletics	Women's 800m	9 December 2019
Gold	Nguyễn Thị Huyền	Athletics	Women's 400m	8 December 2019
Gold	Nguyễn Thị Huyền	Athletics	Women's 400m hurdles	10 December 2019
Gold	Nguyễn Thị Oanh	Athletics	Women's 1500m	8 December 2019
Gold	Nguyễn Thị Oanh	Athletics	Women's 5000m	10 December 2019
Gold	Nguyễn Thị Oanh	Athletics	Women's 3000m steeplechase	10 December 2019
Gold	Phạm Thị Huệ	Athletics	Women's 10000m	8 December 2019
Gold	Phạm Thị Thu Trang	Athletics	Women's 10km walk	8 December 2019
Gold	Nguyễn Thị Hằng; Trần Nhật Hoàng; Quách Thị Lan; Trần Đình Sơn	Athletics	4 x 400m relay – Mixed	7 December 2019
Gold	Nguyễn Thị Oanh; Quách Thị Lan; Hoàng Thị Ngọc; Nguyễn Thị Hằng	Athletics	Women's 4x400m relay	10 December 2019
Gold	Võ Vương Trọng; Huỳnh Nam Tiến; La Văn Lớn; Nguyễn Chí Tâm; Lê Văn Bình; Huỳnh Tấn Vỹ; Hoàng Văn Tiến; Kim Xuân Tiến; Nguyễn Quang Tú; Văn Quang Tùng	Beach handball	Men's team	11 December 2019
Gold	Ngô Đình Nại	Billiards and snooker	Men's 1 cushion carom	8 December 2019
Gold	Nguyễn Thị Tâm	Boxing	Women's flyweight 51kg	9 December 2019
Gold	Trương Thị Phương	Canoeing	Women's singles 500m	6 December 2019
Gold	Trương Thị Phương	Canoeing	Women's singles 200m	7 December 2019
Gold	Đinh Thị Như Quỳnh	Cycling	Women's cross country	1 December 2019
Gold	Nguyễn Thị Thật	Cycling	Women's road race	6 December 2019
Gold	Nguyễn Thị Hải Yến; Nguyễn Đức Hòa	Dancesport	Quickstep	1 December 2019
Gold	Nguyễn Đoàn Minh Trường; Nguyễn Trọng Nhã Uyên	Dancesport	Jive	1 December 2019
Gold	Nguyễn Tiến Nhật	Fencing	Individual épée	5 December 2019
Gold	Nguyễn Tiến Nhật; Trương Trần Nhật Minh; Nguyễn Phước Đến; Đặng Tuấn Anh	Fencing	Team épée	8 December 2019
Gold	Vũ Thành An	Fencing	Individual sabre	3 December 2019
Gold	Nguyễn Văn Quyết; Nguyễn Xuân Lợi; Tô Đức Anh; Vũ Thành An	Fencing	Team sabre	6 December 2019
Gold	Khổng Thị Hằng; Trần Thị Kim Thanh; Trần Thị Hồng Nhung; Phạm Thị Tươi; Vũ Thị Thuý; Nguyễn Thị Liễu; Nguyễn Thị Tuyết Dung; Chương Thị Kiều; Nguyễn Thị Bích Thuỳ; Huỳnh Như; Trần Thị Phương Thảo; Trần Nguyễn Bảo Châu; Hoàng Thị Loan; Vũ Thị Nhung; Thái Thị Thảo; Phạm Hải Yến; Lê Thị Diễm My; Nguyễn Thị Vạn; Dương Thị Vân; Nguyễn Thị Xuyến	Football	Women's team	8 December 2019
Gold	Nguyễn Văn Toản; Bùi Tiến Dũng; Hồ Tấn Tài; Nguyễn Thành Chung; Lê Ngọc Bảo; Huỳnh Tấn Sinh; Đỗ Thanh Thịnh; Nguyễn Đức Chiến; Đoàn Văn Hậu; Nguyễn Quang Hải; Triệu Việt Hưng; Trần Thanh Sơn; Nguyễn Hoàng Đức; Bùi Tiến Dụng; Nguyễn Trọng Hùng; Trương Văn Thái Quý; Nguyễn Trọng Hoàng; Đỗ Hùng Dũng; Nguyễn Tiến Linh; Hà Đức Chinh	Football	Men's team	10 December 2019
Gold	Đặng Nam	Gymnastics	Artistic – Rings	3 December 2019
Gold	Đinh Phương Thành	Gymnastics	Artistic – Parallel Bars	4 December 2019
Gold	Đinh Phương Thành	Gymnastics	Artistic – Horizontal Bars	4 December 2019
Gold	Nguyễn Chế Thanh; Vương Hoài An; Nguyễn Viết Anh	Gymnastics	Aerobics – Trio	9 December 2019
Gold	Phan Thế Gia Hiển; Bùi Minh Phương	Gymnastics	Aerobics – Mixed pair	9 December 2019
Gold	Trần Ngọc Thúy Vi	Gymnastics	Aerobics – Individual	9 December 2019
Gold	Lê Anh Tài	Judo	Men's 90kg	6 December 2019
Gold	Hà Thị Nga; Hồ Thị Như Vân; Nguyễn Ngọc Diễm Phương; Nguyễn Thị Diệu Tiên; Nguyễn Thị Thanh Thủy	Judo	Women's team	7 December 2019
Gold	Lưu Thị Thu Uyên; Nguyễn Thị Phương; Lê Thị Khánh Ly	Karate	Kata – Women's team	8 December 2019
Gold	Nguyễn Thanh Duy	Karate	Kumite – Men's 60kg	8 December 2019
Gold	Huỳnh Văn Tuấn	Kickboxing	Full Contact – Men's 51kg	10 December 2019
Gold	Nguyễn Xuân Phương	Kickboxing	Full Contact – Men's 57kg	10 December 2019
Gold	Phạm Bá Hợi	Kickboxing	Low Kick – Men's 54kg	9 December 2019
Gold	Nguyễn Thị Hằng Nga	Kickboxing	Full Contact – Women's 48kg	9 December 2019
Gold	Lê Đức Đông	Kurash	Men's 66kg	2 December 019
Gold	Vũ Ngọc Sơn	Kurash	Men's 73kg	2 December 019
Gold	Bùi Minh Quân	Kurash	Men's 81kg	2 December 019
Gold	Trần Thương	Kurash	Men's 90kg	1 December 2019
Gold	Hoàng Thị Tĩnh	Kurash	Women's 52kg	1 December 2019
Gold	Nguyễn Thị Lan	Kurash	Women's 70kg	2 December 019
Gold	Nguyễn Thị Thanh Thủy	Kurash	Women's +70kg	2 December 2019
Gold	Bùi Yến Ly	Muaythai	Women's 54kg	8 December 2019
Gold	Trần Tấn Triệu	Open water swimming	Men's 10km	10 December 2019
Gold	Trần Thị Thêm	Pencak Silat	Women's Class B 50–55kg	5 December 2019
Gold	Nguyễn Huy Hoàng	Swimming	Men's 400m freestyle	4 December 2019
Gold	Nguyễn Huy Hoàng	Swimming	Men's 1500m freestyle	5 December 2019
Gold	Trần Hưng Nguyên	Swimming	Men's 200m individual medley	5 December 2019
Gold	Trần Hưng Nguyên	Swimming	Men's 400m individual medley	8 December 2019
Gold	Nguyễn Thị Ánh Viên	Swimming	Women's 200m freestyle	6 December 2019
Gold	Nguyễn Thị Ánh Viên	Swimming	Women's 400m freestyle	7 December 2019
Gold	Nguyễn Thị Ánh Viên	Swimming	Women's 200m backstroke	6 December 2019
Gold	Nguyễn Thị Ánh Viên	Swimming	Women's 100m backstroke	7 December 2019
Gold	Nguyễn Thị Ánh Viên	Swimming	Women's 200m individual medley	4 December 2019
Gold	Nguyễn Thị Ánh Viên	Swimming	Women's 400m individual medley	8 December 2019
Gold	Nguyễn Anh Tú; Đoàn Bá Tuấn Anh	Table tennis	Men's doubles	7 December 2019
Gold	Lý Hoàng Nam	Tennis	Men's singles	6 December 2019
Gold	Nguyễn Thị Mộng Quỳnh	Taekwondo	Poomsae – Women's freestyle	7 December 2019
Gold	Châu Tuyết Vân; Hứa Văn Huy; Nguyễn Ngọc Minh Hy; Nguyễn Thị Lệ Kim; Trần Hồ Duy	Taekwondo	Poomsae – Mixed team	7 December 2019
Gold	Phạm Thị Thu Hiền	Taekwondo	Women's kyorugi – Lightweight 62kg	8 December 2019
Gold	Bạc Thị Khiêm	Taekwondo	Women's kyorugi – Welterweight 67kg	8 December 2019
Gold	Trần Thị Ánh Tuyết	Taekwondo	Women's kyorugi – Bantamweight 53kg	9 December 2019
Gold	Lại Gia Thành	Weightlifting	Men's 55kg	1 December 2019
Gold	Vương Thị Huyền	Weightlifting	Women's 45kg	1 December 2019
Gold	Hoàng Thị Duyên	Weightlifting	Women's 59kg	3 December 2019
Gold	Phạm Thị Hồng Thanh	Weightlifting	Women's 64kg	3 December 2019
Gold	Nguyễn Xuân Định	Wrestling	Men's freestyle 65kg	10 December 2019
Gold	Hà Văn Hiếu	Wrestling	Men's freestyle 125kg	10 December 2019
Gold	Nguyễn Hữu Định	Wrestling	Men's freestyle 61kg	10 December 2019
Gold	Kiều Thị Ly	Wrestling	Women's freestyle 55kg	10 December 2019
Gold	Cấn Tất Dự	Wrestling	Men's freestyle 70kg	10 December 2019
Gold	Nguyễn Văn Công	Wrestling	Men's freestyle 57kg	10 December 2019
Gold	Nguyễn Thị Mỹ Hạnh	Wrestling	Women's freestyle 62kg	10 December 2019
Gold	Nguyễn Thị Xuân	Wrestling	Women's freestyle 50kg	9 December 2019
Gold	Bùi Tiến Hải	Wrestling	Men's Greco Roman 60kg	9 December 2019
Gold	Nghiêm Đình Hiếu	Wrestling	Men's Greco Roman 87kg	9 December 2019
Gold	Nguyễn Bá Sơn	Wrestling	Men's Greco Roman 77kg	9 December 2019
Gold	Nguyễn Đình Huy	Wrestling	Men's Greco Roman 55kg	9 December 2019
Gold	Phạm Quốc Khánh	Wushu	Men's taolu – Nanquan	3 December 2019
Gold	Bùi Trường Giang	Wushu	Men's sanda – 60kg	3 December 2019
Gold	Nguyễn Thị Trang	Wushu	Women's sanda – 65kg	3 December 2019
Silver	Nguyễn Tiến Cương; Nguyễn Văn Đầy; Thạch Phi Hùng	Archery	Compound – Men's team	9 December 2019
Silver	Nguyễn Văn Đầy; Châu Kiều Oanh	Archery	Compound – Mixed team	9 December 2019
Silver	Vũ Văn Kiên	Arnis	Men's Livestick – Featherweight	1 December 2019
Silver	Phú Thái Việt	Arnis	Men's Livestick – Welterweight	1 December 2019
Silver	Văn Công Quốc	Arnis	Men's Padded stick – Bantamweight	2 December 2019
Silver	Nguyễn Đức Trí	Arnis	Men's Padded stick – Featherweight	2 December 2019
Silver	Vương Thanh Tùng	Arnis	Men's Padded stick – Welterweight	2 December 2019
Silver	Ngô Văn Huỳnh	Arnis	Men's Anyo – Non-traditional Open Weapon	3 December 2019
Silver	Nguyễn Thị Hương	Arnis	Women's Livestick – Bantamweight	1 December 2019
Silver	Nguyễn Thị Hương	Arnis	Women's Padded stick – Bantamweight	2 December 2019
Silver	Nguyễn Thị Cúc	Arnis	Women's Padded stick – Welterweight	2 December 2019
Silver	Triệu Thị Hoài	Arnis	Women's Anyo – Non-traditional Open Weapon	3 December 2019
Silver	Trần Đình Sơn	Athletics	Men's 400m	8 December 2019
Silver	Nguyễn Văn Lai	Athletics	Men's 5000m	9 December 2019
Silver	Nguyễn Trung Cường	Athletics	Men's 3000m steeplechase	10 December 2019
Silver	Võ Xuân Vĩnh	Athletics	Men's 20km walk	9 December 2019
Silver	Bùi Văn Sự	Athletics	Men's Decathlon	10 December 2019
Silver	Lê Tú Chinh	Athletics	Women's 200m	7 December 2019
Silver	Khuất Phương Anh	Athletics	Women's 800m	9 December 2019
Silver	Phạm Thị Huệ	Athletics	Women's 5000m	10 December 2019
Silver	Phạm Thị Hồng Lệ	Athletics	Women's 10000m	8 December 2019
Silver	Trần Thị Yến Hoa	Athletics	Women's 100m hurdles	9 December 2019
Silver	Quách Thị Lan	Athletics	Women's 400m hurdles	10 December 2019
Silver	Lò Thị Hoàng	Athletics	Women's Javelin throw	8 December 2019
Silver	Đỗ Thế Kiên	Billiards and snooker	Men's 9-ball pool singles	10 December 2019
Silver	Đỗ Thế Kiên	Billiards and snooker	Men's 10-ball pool singles	9 December 2019
Silver	Phạm Cảnh Phúc	Billiards and snooker	Men's 1-cushion carom	8 December 2019
Silver	Nguyễn Văn Đương	Boxing	Men's Bantamweight 56kg	9 December 2019
Silver	Nguyễn Văn Hải	Boxing	Men's Light welterweight 64kg	9 December 2019
Silver	Nguyễn Mạnh Cường	Boxing	Men's Middleweight 75kg	9 December 2019
Silver	Trương Đình Hoàng	Boxing	Men's Light heavyweight 81kg	9 December 2019
Silver	Đỗ Nhã Uyên	Boxing	Women's Bantamweight 54kg	9 December 2019
Silver	Trần Văn Vũ	Kayak	Men's K1 1000m	6 December 2019
Silver	Cà Thị Thơm	Cycling	Women's cross-country	1 December 2019
Silver	Nguyễn Ngọc Trường Sơn	Chess	Men's rapid	3 December 2019
Silver	Lê Quang Liêm	Chess	Men's blitz	8 December 2019
Silver	Nguyễn Đức Hòa; Nguyễn Thị Hải Yến	Dancesport	Tango	1 December 2019
Silver	Nguyễn Đức Hòa; Nguyễn Thị Hải Yến	Dancesport	Viennese Waltz	1 December 2019
Silver	Vũ Hoàng Anh Minh; Nguyễn Trường Xuân	Dancesport	Waltz	1 December 2019
Silver	Vũ Hoàng Anh Minh; Nguyễn Trường Xuân	Dancesport	Standard Five Dance	1 December 2019
Silver	Nguyễn Đoàn Minh Trường; Nguyễn Trọng Nhã Uyên	Dancesport	Samba	1 December 2019
Silver	Nguyễn Đoàn Minh Trường; Nguyễn Trọng Nhã Uyên	Dancesport	Latin American Five Dance	1 December 2019
Silver	Lê Hữu Phước	Dancesport	Men's Breakdance	1 December 2019
Silver	Đỗ Thị Anh; Lưu Thị Thanh Nhàn; Nguyễn Thị Thu Phương; Nguyễn Thu Phương	Fencing	Women's team foil	6 December 2019
Silver	Bùi Thị Thu Hà; Đỗ Thị Tâm; Lê Minh Hằng; Phùng Thị Khánh Linh	Fencing	Women's team sabre	8 December 2019
Silver	Đinh Phương Thành	Gymnastics	Artistic – Men's All-around	1 December 2019
Silver	Đỗ Thị Ngọc Hương	Gymnastics	Artistic – Uneven bars	3 December 2019
Silver	Nguyễn Tấn Công	Judo	Men's 73kg	5 December 2019
Silver	Bùi Thiện Hoàng; Lê Khắc Nhân; Nguyễn Châu Hoàng Lân; Nguyễn Hai Bà; Nguyễn Tấn Công; Phan Vũ Nam	Judo	Men's team	7 December 2019
Silver	Nguyễn Thị Bích Ngọc	Judo	Women's 57kg	5 December 2019
Silver	Nguyễn Thị Như Ý	Judo	Women's 78kg	6 December 2019
Silver	Đào Lê Thu Trang	Jujitsu	Women's 45kg	9 December 2019
Silver	Nguyễn Ngọc Tú	Jujitsu	Women's 62kg	10 December 2019
Silver	Nguyễn Thị Phương	Karate	Kata Women's individual	7 December 2019
Silver	Đỗ Thành Nhân	Karate	Kumite Men's +75kg	9 December 2019
Silver	Đinh Thị Hương	Karate	Kumite Women's –50kg	7 December 2019
Silver	Lê Đình Vũ	Kurash	Men's +90kg	1 December 2019
Silver	Nguyễn Doãn Long	Muaythai	Men's 57kg	8 December 2019
Silver	Nguyễn Huy Hoàng	Open water swimming	Men's 10km	10 December 2019
Silver	Nguyễn Đình Tuấn	Pencak Silat	Men's class B 50–55 kg	5 December 2019
Silver	Nguyễn Văn Hòa; Nhữ Đình Nam	Rowing	Men's lightweight double sculls	8 December 2019
Silver	Phạm Thị Huệ; Lê Thị Hiền	Rowing	Women's pair	8 December 2019
Silver	Đinh Thị Hảo; Tạ Thanh Huyền	Rowing	Women's lightweight double sculls	7 December 2019
Silver	Dương Thị Xuyến; Nguyễn Thị Mỹ; Nguyễn Thị Phương Trinh; Trần Thị Thu Hoài	Sepak takraw	Women's regu	9 December 2019
Silver	Hoàng Xuân Vinh	Shooting	Men's 10m air pistol	7 December 2019
Silver	Lê Nguyễn Paul	Swimming	Men's 100m backstroke	4 December 2019
Silver	Phạm Thanh Bảo	Swimming	Men's 100m breaststroke	4 December 2019
Silver	Phạm Thanh Bảo	Swimming	Men's 200m breaststroke	7 December 2019
Silver	Hoàng Quý Phước; Nguyễn Hữu Kim Sơn; Ngô Đình Chuyền; Nguyễn Huy Hoàng	Swimming	Men's 4x200m freestyle relay	4 December 2019
Silver	Nguyễn Thị Ánh Viên	Swimming	Women's 800m freestyle	9 December 2019
Silver	Nguyễn Thị Ánh Viên	Swimming	Women's 50m backstroke	5 December 2019
Silver	Nguyễn Ngọc Minh Hy	Taekwondo	Poomsae – Men's freestyle	7 December 2019
Silver	Lê Thanh Trung; Nguyễn Thiên Phụng; Trần Tiến Khoa	Taekwondo	Poomsae – Men's recognized team	7 December 2019
Silver	Daniel Nguyễn	Tennis	Men's single	6 December 2019
Silver	Savanna Lý Nguyễn	Tennis	Women's single	6 December 2019
Silver	Bùi Thị Ngà; Đặng Thị Kim Thanh; Đoàn Thị Lâm Oanh; Hoàng Thị Kiều Trinh; Lê Thị Hồng; Lê Thị Yến; Lưu Thị Huệ; Nguyễn Thị Kim Liên; Nguyễn Thị Trinh; Nguyễn Thị Xuân; Nguyễn Thu Hoài; Trần Thị Bích Thủy; Trần Thị Thanh Thúy; Trần Tú Linh	Volleyball	Women's indoor volleyball	9 December 2019
Silver	Nguyễn Công Thành	Wrestling	Men's Greco-Roman 63kg	9 December 2019
Silver	Dương Hồng Phúc	Wrestling	Men's Greco-Roman 72kg	9 December 2019
Silver	Thạch Kim Tuấn	Weightlifting	Men's 61kg	2 December 2019
Silver	Đinh Xuân Hoàng	Weightlifting	Men's 67kg	3 December 2019
Silver	Phạm Tuấn Anh	Weightlifting	Men's 73kg	4 December 2019
Silver	Nguyễn Thị Thúy	Weightlifting	Women's 55kg	2 December 2019
Silver	Nguyễn Thị Vân	Weightlifting	Women's 71kg	4 December 2019
Silver	Trần Thị Minh Huyền	Wushu	Women's taolu – Taijijian	3 December 2019
Silver	Nguyễn Thị Chinh	Wushu	Women's sanda	3 December 2019
