= Philippines at the 2019 SEA Games =

Philippines at the 2019 Southeast Asian Games
- IOC code: PHI
- NOC: Philippine Olympic Committee
- Website: www.olympic.ph

in the Philippines
- Competitors: 1,115 in 56 sports
- Flag bearers (opening): Margielyn Didal; EJ Obiena; Eumir Marcial; Meggie Ochoa; Kiyomi Watanabe
- Flag bearer (closing): Roger Casugay
- Officials: 753
- Medals Ranked 1st: Gold 149 Silver 117 Bronze 121 Total 387

Southeast Asian Games appearances (overview)
- 1977; 1979; 1981; 1983; 1985; 1987; 1989; 1991; 1993; 1995; 1997; 1999; 2001; 2003; 2005; 2007; 2009; 2011; 2013; 2015; 2017; 2019; 2021; 2023; 2025; 2027; 2029

The Philippines competed at the 30th Southeast Asian Games which was hosted by them from 30 November to 11 December 2019. This was the fourth time that the country hosted the biennial meet.

The country placed 1st again in the medal tally with 149 gold medals and 36 higher than the 23rd SEA Games in 2005 wherein the Philippines also hosted and placed 1st.

The host Philippines emerged in the medal tally as the overall champion for the first time in 14 years breaking its own medal count record in 2005.

== Preparations ==
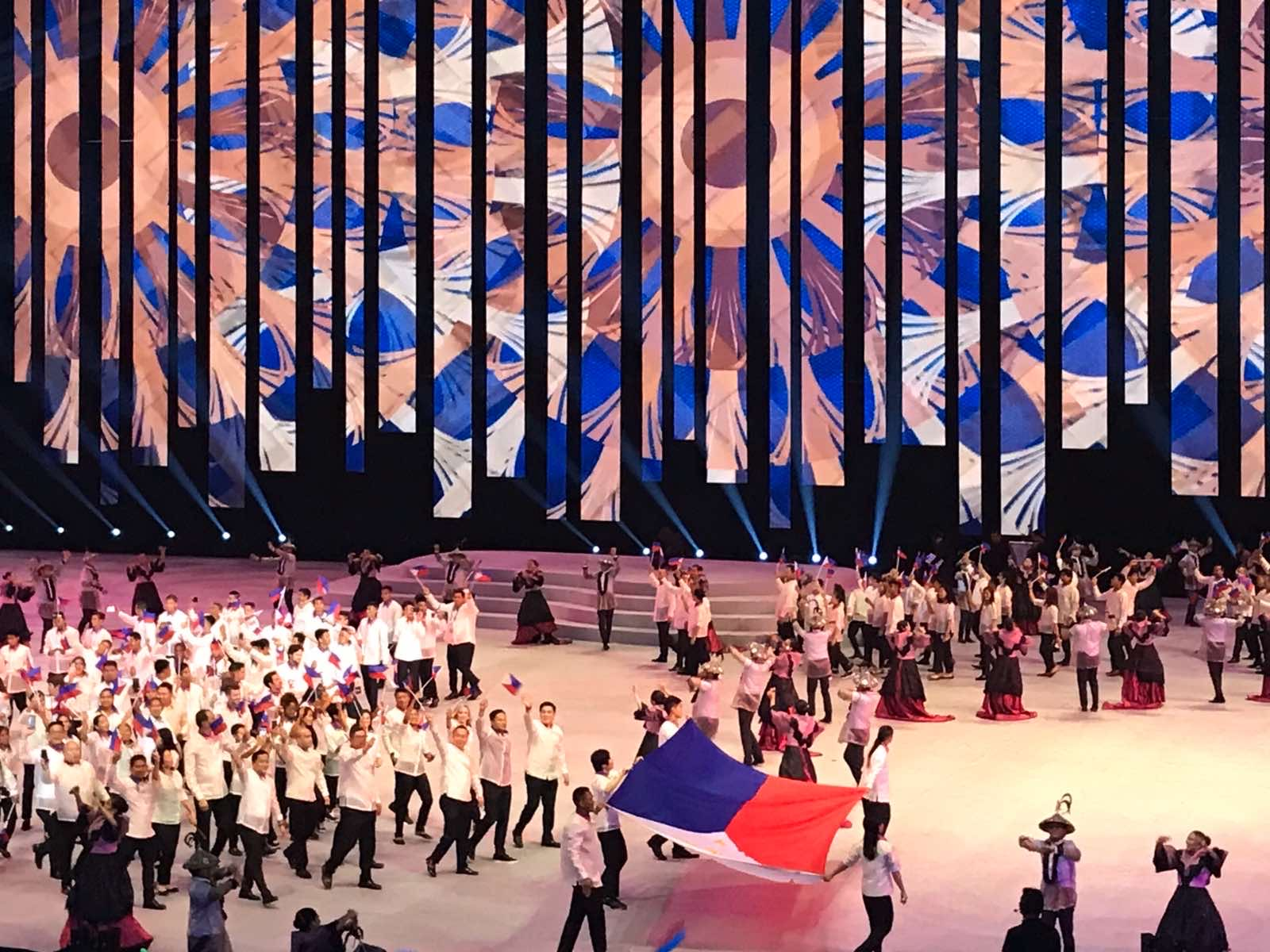
The Philippine delegation at the opening ceremony.

Monsour del Rosario was tasked to prepare the Philippine delegation to the 2019 Southeast Asian Games as its chef de mission. He along with other appointed officials by the Philippine Olympic Committee was fired from their post on July 27, 2019 by then-President of the Ricky Vargas due to a "loss of trust and confidence". He was then replaced on July 29, 2019 by Philippine Sports Commission Chairman Butch Ramirez after being convinced by his superiors in the Philippine government who initially declined to be appointed the day before. Ada Milby of rugby and Stephen Fernandez of taekwondo were named as Ramirez's deputies.

As host, Filipino athletes has the advantage of accessing the facilities to be used in the Games. It is projected that by mid-August 2019, Filipino athletes can already move in the Athlete's Village of the New Clark City Sports Hub so they can have easy and early access to the sports complex's facilities. On July 3, 2019, the track oval of the Athletics Stadium was made available to use for training of Filipino track and field athletes even if the stadium is still under construction.

The official training attire of the Philippine delegation is a predominantly red tracksuit which were provided by Asics. The attire of the delegation to be worn in the parade is a barong tagalog-inspired clothing was conceptualized by Filipino designer Francis Libiran. The parade attire features a detachable blue and red collar alluding to the Philippine flag and an embossed sun rays motif on the clothes sleeves.

The Philippines as hosts have the largest delegation to the games which consist of 1,115 athletes, 753 coaches and officials. The delegation will have six flagbearers at the opening ceremony: Hidilyn Diaz (weightlifting), Margielyn Didal (skateboarding), EJ Obiena (pole vault), Eumir Marcial (boxing), Nesthy Petecio (boxing), and Kiyomi Watanabe (judo).

== Medalists ==
Medalists are entitled to incentive from the government through the Philippine Sports Commission per R.A. 10699.

=== Gold ===
No.	Medal	Name	Sport	Event	Date
1	Gold	John Leerams Chicano	Triathlon	Men's Triathlon	1 December
2	Gold	Kim Mangrobang	Triathlon	Women's Triathlon	1 December
3	Gold	Mark Jayson Gayon; Mary Joy Renigen	Dancesport	Standard Slow - Foxtrot	1 December
4	Gold	Sean Mischa Aranar; Ana Leonila Nualla	Dancesport	Standard - Viennese Waltz	1 December
5	Gold	Sean Mischa Aranar; Ana Leonila Nualla	Dancesport	Standard - Tango	1 December
6	Gold	Mark Jayson Gayon; Mary Joy Renigen	Dancesport	Standard - Waltz	1 December
7	Gold	Agatha Chrystenzen Wong	Wushu	Women's taolu - Taijiquan	1 December
8	Gold	Sean Mischa Aranar; Ana Leonila Nualla	Dancesport	Standard - Five Dances	1 December
9	Gold	John John Bobier; Jason Huerte; Metodio Suico Jr.	Sepak Takraw	Men's Hoop	1 December
10	Gold	Deseree Autor; Josefina Maat; Sarah Jean Kalalo	Sepak Takraw	Women's Hoop	1 December
11	Gold	Wilbert Aunzo; Pearl Marie Cañeda	Dancesport	Latin America - Samba	1 December
12	Gold	Wilbert Aunzo; Pearl Marie Cañeda	Dancesport	Latin America - Cha cha cha	1 December
13	Gold	Wilbert Aunzo; Pearl Marie Cañeda	Dancesport	Latin America - Rumba	1 December
14	Gold	Michael Angelo Marquez; Stephanie Sabalo	Dancesport	Latin America - Paso Doble	1 December
15	Gold	Michael Angelo Marquez; Stephanie Sabalo	Dancesport	Latin America - Five Dances	1 December
16	Gold	Mike Bañares	Arnis	Men's Livestick Welterweight	1 December
17	Gold	Niño Mark Talledo	Arnis	Men's Livestick Featherweight	1 December
18	Gold	Villardo Cunamay	Arnis	Men's Livestick Lightweight	1 December
19	Gold	Dexler Bolambao	Arnis	Men's Livestick Bantamweight	1 December
20	Gold	Carlos Yulo	Gymnastics	Men's Artistic All-Around	1 December
21	Gold	Jezebel Morcillo	Arnis	Women's Livestick Bantamweight	1 December
22	Gold	Estie Gay Liwanen	Kurash	Women's 63 kg	1 December
23	Gold	Monica Torres	Duathlon	Women's individual	2 December
24	Gold	Lea Denise Belgira	Cycling	Women's Mountain Biking Downhill	2 December
25	Gold	John Derrick Farr	Cycling	Men's Mountain Biking Downhill	2 December
26	Gold	Edmar Tacuel	Pencak silat	Men's seni Artistic Singles	2 December
27	Gold	Jesfer Huquire	Arnis	Men's Padded Stick Bantamweight	2 December
28	Gold	Elmer Manlapas	Arnis	Men's Padded Stick Featherweight	2 December
29	Gold	Carloyd Tejada	Arnis	Men's Padded Stick PS Welterweight	2 December
30	Gold	Jack Danielle Animam; Afril Bernardino; Clare Castro; Janine Pontejos	Basketball	Women's 3x3 Tournament	2 December
31	Gold	CJ Perez; Jason Perkins; Moala Tautuaa; Chris Newsome	Basketball	Men's 3x3 tournament	2 December
32	Gold	Sheena Belmonte	Arnis	Women's Padded Stick Bantamweight	2 December
33	Gold	Maria Claire Adorna; Jose Casares; John Leerams Chicano; Kim Mangrobang	Triathlon	Mixed Relay	2 December
34	Gold	Hidilyn Diaz	Weightlifting	Women's 55kg	2 December
35	Gold	Jedah Mae Soriano	Arnis	Women's Padded Stick Featherweight	2 December
36	Gold	Ross Ashley Monville	Arnis	Women's Padded Stick Lightweight	2 December
37	Gold	Abegail Abad	Arnis	Women's Padded Stick Welterweight	2 December
38	Gold	Rodel Labayo; Angelo Morales	Lawn bowls	Men's pairs	2 December
39	Gold	Agatha Chrystenzen Wong	Wushu	Women's taolu taijijian	3 December
40	Gold	Crisamuel Delfin	Arnis	Men's Anyo Non-traditional Open Weapon	3 December
41	Gold	Mary Allin Aldeguer	Arnis	Women's Anyo Non-traditional Open Weapon	3 December
42	Gold	Divine Wally	Wushu	Women's sanda 48kg	3 December
43	Gold	Jessie Aligaga	Wushu	Men's sanda 48kg	3 December
44	Gold	Francisco Solis	Wushu	Men's sanda 56kg	3 December
45	Gold	Arnel Mandal	Wushu	Men's sanda 52kg	3 December
46	Gold	Clemente Tabugara Jr.	Wushu	Men's sanda 65kg	3 December
47	Gold	Carlos Yulo	Gymnastics	Men's Artistic Floor Exercise	3 December
48	Gold	Kyle Redentor Antolin; Kaizen Dela Serna; Monolito Divina; Deanne Nicole Moncada	Obstacle Racing	Team Assist 400m	4 December
49	Gold	Diana Buhler; Jeffrey Reginio; Klymille Keilah Rodriguez; Nathaniel Sanchez	Obstacle Racing	Team Relay 400m	4 December
50	Gold	Rochelle Suarez	Obstacle Racing	Women's 100m	4 December
51	Gold	Kevin Jeffrey	Obstacle Racing	Men's 100m	4 December
52	Gold	Marly Martir	Shooting	Women's individual Precision Pistol	4 December
53	Gold	Kristel Macrohon	Weightlifting	Women's 71kg	4 December
54	Gold	Elvie Baldivino; Marly Martir; Franchette Quiroz	Shooting	Women's team Precision Pistol	4 December
55	Gold	Jearome Calica; Joemar Gallaza	Muay Thai	Men's Waikru	4 December
56	Gold	James Deiparine	Swimming	Men's 100m breaststroke	4 December
57	Gold	Jermyn Prado	Cycling	Women's Road Cycling Time Trial	5 December
58	Gold	Margielyn Didal	Skateboarding	Women's Game of Skate	5 December
59	Gold	Daniel Ledermann	Skateboarding	Men's Game of Skate	5 December
60	Gold	Jylyn Nicanor	Fencing	Women's individual Sabre	5 December
61	Gold	Princess Arbilon; Samuel German	Modern Pentathlon	Mixed Beach Laser Relay	5 December
62	Gold	Shugen Nakano	Judo	Men's Combat 66kg	5 December
63	Gold	Mark Striegl	Sambo	Men's Combat 74kg	5 December
64	Gold	Chino Sy	Sambo	Men's Sport 82kg	5 December
65	Gold	Kiyomi Watanabe	Judo	Women's Combat 63kg	5 December
66	Gold	Mervin Guarte	Obstacle Racing	Men's 5km	6 December
67	Gold	Sandi Abahan	Obstacle Racing	Women's 5km	6 December
68	Gold	Christine Hallasgo	Athletics	Women's Marathon	6 December
69	Gold	Michael Comaling	Modern Pentathlon	Men's Beach	6 December
70	Gold	Bianca Pagdanganan	Golf	Women's individual	6 December
71	Gold	Mariya Takahashi	Judo	Women's Combat 70kg	6 December
72	Gold	Jemyca Aribado; Reymark Begornia; Robert Andrew Garcia; David William Pelino	Squash	Mixed Team	6 December
73	Gold	Cris Nievarez	Rowing	Men's Lightweight Single Sculls	7 December
74	Gold	Melcah Caballero; Joanie Delgaco	Rowing	Women's lightweight double sculls	7 December
75	Gold	Hermie Macarenas	Canoeing	Men's canoeing & Kayaking C1 200m	7 December
76	Gold	Daniela Dela Pisa	Gymnastics	Rhythmic Hoop	7 December
77	Gold	Rodolfo Reyes Jr.	Taekwondo	Men's Recognized Poomsae	7 December
78	Gold	Margielyn Didal	Skateboarding	Women's Street	7 December
79	Gold	Francis Casey Alcantara; Jeson Patrombon	Tennis	Men's doubles	7 December
80	Gold	Jocel Ninobla	Taekwondo	Women's Recognized Poomsae	7 December
81	Gold	Junna Tsukii	Karate	Women's kumite -50kg	7 December
82	Gold	Ridgely Balladares; Rubin Cruz Jr. Whok Dimapilis; Richly Magsanay; Joel Mejarito; Edgar Villapaña	Sailing	Mixed Keelboat Fleet Racing in FE28R	7 December
83	Gold	Hanniel Abella; Mickyle Bustos; Anna Gabriella Estimada; Harlene Raguin	Fencing	Women's team épée	7 December
84	Gold	Bien Zoleta-Mañalac	Soft tennis	Women's singles	7 December
85	Gold	Dustin Jacob Mella; Raphael Enrico Mella; Rodolfo Reyes Jr.	Taekwondo	Men's Recognized Team Poomsae	7 December
86	Gold	Chezka Centeno	Billiards	Women's 10-ball Pool Singles	7 December
87	Gold	Jeordan Dominguez	Taekwondo	Men's freestyle Poomsae	7 December
88	Gold	Kristina Knott	Athletics	Women's 200m	7 December
89	Gold	Lester Tayong; Emerson Villena	Sailing	Men's international 470	7 December
90	Gold	EJ Obiena	Athletics	Men's pole vault	7 December
91	Gold	Cheska Altomonte; Mary Ann Antolihao; Riflayca Basa; Garnet Agnes Blando; Khrisha Genuary Cantor; Shaira Damasing; Elsie Dela Torre; Ma. Angelu Gabriel; Kaith Ezra Jalandoni; Mary Joy Maguad; Ma. Celestine Palma; Royevel Palma; Mary Nicole Pasadas; Cristy Joy Roa; Jenette Rusia; Angelie Ursabia; Arianne Vallestero	Softball	Women's team	8 December
92	Gold	Lois Kaye Go; Bianca Pagdanganan	Golf	Women's team	8 December
93	Gold	Melcah Caballero	Rowing	Women's Lightweight Single Sculls	8 December
94	Gold	Roger Casugay	Surfing	Men's Longboard	8 December
95	Gold	Nielbie Blancada	Surfing	Women's Shortboard	8 December
96	Gold	Bambi Zoleta; Bien Zoleta-Mañalac	Soft tennis	Women's doubles	8 December
97	Gold	Christiana Means	Skateboarding	Women's Park	8 December
98	Gold	Dino Emiglio Altomonte; Adriane Ros Bernardo; Erwin Bosito; Clarence Lyle Caasalan; Bryan Victrix Castillo; Alfredo de Guzman III; Junmar Diarao; Vladimir Eguia; Ignacio Luis Escano; Francis Michael Gesmundo; Arvin Maynard Herrera; Jarus Inobio; Romeo Jasmin Jr. Ferdinand Liguayan Jr. Juan Diego Lozano; Juan Alvaro Macasaet; Juan Paolo Macasaet; Mark Steven Manaig; Jennald Pareja; Jonash Ponce; Jon Jon Robles; Miguel Jose Salud; Kyle Rodrigo Villafaña Jr. Jerome Yenson	Baseball	Men's team	8 December
99	Gold	Susan Larsson	Water skiing	Women's Wakeskate	8 December
100	Gold	Jhondi Wallace	Water skiing	Men's Wakeskate	8 December
101	Gold	Ariel Lee Lampacan	Muay Thai	Men's 54kg	8 December
102	Gold	Phillip Delarmino	Muay Thai	Men's 57kg	8 December
103	Gold	Jericho Francisco	Skateboarding	Men's Park	8 December
104	Gold	Timothy Alonso Berry; Donald Cannon Coleman; Justin Villazor Coveney; Joe Palabay Dawson; Robert Luceno Fogerty; Tommy Kalaw Gilbert; Ryan Reyes Howe; Harry Dionson Morris; Patrice Ortiz Olivier; Luc Villalba Smith; Ned Plarizan Stephenson; Vincent Amar Young	Rugby sevens	Men's team	8 December
105	Gold	Pauline Lopez	Taekwondo	Women's kyorugi featherweight 57kg	8 December
106	Gold	Jaime De Lange	Skateboarding	Men's downhill	8 December
107	Gold	Dave Cea	Taekwondo	Men's Kyorugi Lightweight 74kg	8 December
108	Gold	Natalie Rose Uy	Athletics	Women's pole vault	8 December
109	Gold	Samuel Morrison	Taekwondo	Men's kyorugi welterweight 80kg	8 December
110	Gold	Sarah Dequinan	Athletics	Women's Heptathlon	8 December
111	Gold	William Morrison III	Athletics	Men's shot put	8 December
112	Gold	Eric Cray; Kristina Knott; Anfernee Lopena; Eloiza Luzon	Athletics	Mixed Team 4x100m Relay	8 December
113	Gold	Jeniel "Haze" Bata-Anon; Angelo Kyle "Pheww" Arcangel; Allan Sancio "Lusty" Castromayor; Karl Gabriel "KarlTzy" Nepomuceno; Carlito "Ribo" Ribo Jr. Jason Rafael "Jay" Torculas; Kenneth Jiane "Kenji" Villa	Esports	Mobile Legends: Bang Bang	8 December
114	Gold	Paul Marton dela Cruz; Rachelle dela Cruz	Archery	Compound Mixed Team	9 December
115	Gold	Jamie Lim	Karate	Women's kumite +61kg	9 December
116	Gold	Geylord Coveta	Wind surfing	Men's RS One Event	9 December
117	Gold	Yancy Kaibigan	Wind surfing	Men's RS X Event	9 December
118	Gold	Ridgely Balladares; Rubin Cruz Jr. Whok Dimapilis; Richly Magsanay; Joel Mejarito; Edgar Villapaña	Sailing	Mixed Keelboat Match Racing in FE28R	9 December
119	Gold	Carlo Paalam	Boxing	Men's light flyweight 46-49kg	9 December
120	Gold	Carlo Peña	Jujitsu	Men's 56kg	9 December
121	Gold	Meggie Ochoa	Jujitsu	Women's 45kg	9 December
122	Gold	Rogen Ladon	Boxing	Men's Flyweight 52kg	9 December
123	Gold	Dean Roxas	Jujitsu	Men's 85kg	9 December
124	Gold	Josie Gabuco	Boxing	Women's light flyweight 48kg	9 December
125	Gold	James Palicte	Boxing	Men's Light Welterweight 64kg	9 December
126	Gold	Jason Baucas	Wrestling	Men's Greco-Roman 72kg	9 December
127	Gold	Noel Norada	Wrestling	Men's Greco-Roman 63kg	9 December
128	Gold	Kurt Bryan Barbosa	Taekwondo	Men's Kyorugi Finweight 54kg	9 December
129	Gold	Melvin Calano	Athletics	Men's javelin throw	9 December
130	Gold	Clinton Kingsley Bautista	Athletics	Men's 110m hurdles	9 December
131	Gold	Charly Suarez	Boxing	Men's Lightweight 60kg	9 December
132	Gold	Jerry Olsim	Kickboxing	Men's Kick Light 69kg	9 December
133	Gold	Dennis Orcollo	Billiards	Men's 10-ball Pool Singles	9 December
134	Gold	Nesthy Petecio	Boxing	Women's Featherweight 57kg	9 December
135	Gold	Eumir Marcial	Boxing	Men's Middleweight 75kg	9 December
136	Gold	Bryle Jacob "cml" Alvizo; James Erice "Erice" Guerra; Jun "Bok" Kanehara; Van Jerico "Van" Manalaysay; Marvin "Boomy" Rushton; John Anthony "Natsumi" Vargas; Mc Nicholson "Mac" Villanueva	Esports	Dota 2	9 December
137	Gold	Ridgely Balladares; Rubin Cruz Jr. Whok Dimapilis; Richly Magsanay; Joel Mejarito; Edgar Villapana	Sailing	Mixed Keelboat Fleet Racing in FE28R	9 December
138	Gold	Mark Alcoseba; Joseph Arcilla; Noel Damian Jr. Mikoff Maduriao; Kevin Mamawal; Dheo Talatayod	Soft tennis	Men's team	10 December
139	Gold	Eric Ang; Carlos Carag; Alexander Topacio	Shooting	Men's Trap Team	10 December
140	Gold	Caviar "EnDerr" Acampado	Esports	Starcraft II	10 December
141	Gold	Annie Ramirez	Jujitsu	Women's 55kg	10 December
142	Gold	Adrian Guggenheim	Jujitsu	Men's 77kg	10 December
143	Gold	Gina Iniong	Kickboxing	Women's Kick Light 55kg	10 December
144	Gold	Eric Cray	Athletics	Men's 400m hurdles	10 December
145	Gold	Aries Toledo	Athletics	Men's Decathlon	10 December
146	Gold	Jack Animam; Afril Bernardino; France Mae Cabinbin; Ana Alicia Katrina Castillo; Clare Castro; Eunique Chan; Kelli Casey Hayes; Danica Therese Jose; Ria Joy Nabalan; Janine Pontejos; Nathalia Prado; Marizze Andrea Tongco	Basketball	Women's 5x5 Team	10 December
147	Gold	Rubilen Amit; Chezka Centeno	Billiards	Women's 9-ball Pool Doubles	10 December
148	Gold	Jean Claude Saclag	Kickboxing	Men's Low Kick 63.5kg	10 December
149	Gold	Japeth Aguilar; June Mar Fajardo; Marcio Lassiter; Vic Manuel; Stanley Pringle; Kiefer Ravena; Troy Rosario; Chris Ross; Greg Slaughter; Christian Standhardinger; LA Tenorio; Matthew Wright	Basketball	Men's 5x5 Team	10 December

=== Silver ===
No.	Medal	Name	Sport	Event	Date
1	Silver	Andrew Kim Remolino	Triathlon	Men's individual	1 December
2	Silver	Kim Kilgroe	Triathlon	Women's individual	1 December
3	Silver	Mark Jayson Gayon; Mary Joy Renigen	Dancesport	Standard Quickstep	1 December
4	Silver	Michael Angelo Marquez; Stephanie Sabalo	Dancesport	Latin America Jive	1 December
5	Silver	Niño Surban	Cycling	Men's Mountain Biking Cross-country	1 December
6	Silver	Jude Oliver Rodriguez	Arnis	Women's Livestick Featherweight	1 December
7	Silver	Mummar Alamara; Abnel Amiladjid; Mico Anota; Roy Cañete Jr; Tani Gomez Jr; Adan Gonzales; Macgyver Reyes; Reynaldo Salonga Jr; Juan Paolo Serrano; Vincent Sicat; Romark Johnson Belo Teodoro; Mark Jerwin Valdez; Matthew Royce Yu	Water polo	Men's team	1 December
8	Silver	Augustus Aguirre; Tomas Vicente Bitong; Stefano Juban; Eduardo Miguel Lopez	Polo	4-6 High Goal	1 December
9	Silver	Allison Perticheto	Figure skating	Ladie's Figure skating Singles	1 December
10	Silver	Christopher Caluza	Figure skating	Men's Figure skating Singles	1 December
11	Silver	John Fabroar Ceniza	Weightlifting	Men's 55kg	1 December
12	Silver	Jenilou Mosqueda	Kurash	Women's 57kg	1 December
13	Silver	Joey Delos Reyes	Duathlon	Men's Events Individual	2 December
14	Silver	Jones Inso	Wushu	Men's taolu taijijian	2 December
15	Silver	Eleazar Barba Jr.	Cycling	Men's Mountain Biking Downhill	2 December
16	Silver	Billy Joel Valenzuela	Arnis	Men's Padded Stick Lightweight	2 December
17	Silver	Celedonio Tayao	Shooting	Benchrest Shooting Air Rifle (Light Varmint)	2 December
18	Silver	Bianca Mae Estrella	Kurash	Women's 70kg	2 December
19	Silver	Marisa Baronda; Sharon Hauters; Hazel Jagonoy	Lawn bowls	Women's fours	2 December
20	Silver	Elmer Abatayo; Christopher Dagpin; Hommer Mercado	Lawn bowls	Men's triples	2 December
21	Silver	Margaret Colonia	Weightlifting	Women's 59kg	3 December
22	Silver	Mark David Puzon	Arnis	Men's Anyo Traditional Open Weapon	3 December
23	Silver	Gideon Fred Padua	Wushu	Men's sanda 60kg	3 December
24	Silver	Ryssa Jezzel Sanchez	Arnis	Women's Anyo Traditional Open	3 December
25	Silver	Mary Francine Padios	Pencak silat	Women's singles	3 December
26	Silver	Almohaidib Abad; Jan Alfau	Pencak silat	Men's seni Artistic Doubles	3 December
27	Silver	Elreen Ann Ando	Weightlifting	Women's 64kg	3 December
28	Silver	Christian Jhester Concepcion	Fencing	Men's individual Sabre	3 December
29	Silver	Carlos Yulo	Gymnastics	Pommel Horse	3 December
30	Silver	Carlos Yulo	Gymnastics	Rings	3 December
31	Silver	Robert Andrew Garcia	Squash	Men's singles	3 December
32	Silver	Milky Mae Tejares	Obstacle Racing	Women's 100m	4 December
33	Silver	Sonia Bruce; Ainie Knight; Nancy Toyco	Lawn bowls	Women's triples	4 December
34	Silver	Roy Aldous Arayata; Jonathan Bejar; Alexander Colet; Ramon Jorge; Cesar Marasigan III; Ricardo Tobias Papa; Reynaldo Paras; Jasper Parulan; Christopher Policarpo; David Quiec; Kelvin Tan; Francis Robert Yanga	Underwater hockey	Men's 4x4	4 December
35	Silver	Jelyn Baldonado; Nandja Buenafe; Ivy Canlas; Jacklyn Joyce Chua; Mary Bridget Josef; JV Christabelle Lim; JV Kristine Lim; Karen Anne Naguit; Chari May Ongyanco; Maria Ines Templo; Johanna Uy; Micheline Uy	Underwater hockey	Women's 4x4	4 December
36	Silver	Rusha Mae Bayacsan; Irendin Lepatan	Muay Thai	Women's Waikru Events	4 December
37	Silver	Carlos Yulo	Gymnastics	Men's vault	4 December
38	Silver	Carlos Yulo	Gymnastics	Parallel Bars	4 December
39	Silver	Carlos Yulo	Gymnastics	Horizontal Bar	4 December
40	Silver	Hanniel Abella	Fencing	Women's individual Epee	4 December
41	Silver	Remedy Rule	Swimming	Women's 200m butterfly	4 December
42	Silver	Jelyn Baldonado; Nandja Buenafe; Ivy Canlas; Jacklyn Joyce Chua; Mary Bridget Josef; JV Christabelle Lim; JV Kristine Lim; Karen Anne Naguit; Chari May Ongyanco; Maria Ines Templo; Johanna Uy; Micheline Uy	Underwater hockey	Women's 6x6	5 December
43	Silver	Samuel German	Modern Pentathlon	Men's Beach Laser	5 December
44	Silver	Ditto Nestor Dinopol	Shooting	Benchrest Air Rifle (Heavy Varmint)	5 December
45	Silver	Christiana Means	Skateboarding	Women's Game of Skate	5 December
46	Silver	Gilbert Ramirez	Judo	Men's Combat 81kg	5 December
47	Silver	Mohammad Sherwin Managil	Obstacle Racing	Men's 5km	6 December
48	Silver	Glorien Merisco	Obstacle Racing	Women's 5km	6 December
49	Silver	Mary Joy Tabal	Athletics	Women's Marathon	6 December
50	Silver	Jermyn Prado	Cycling	Women's Road Cycling Road Race	6 December
51	Silver	Hermie Macaranas	Canoeing	Men's canoeing & Kayaking C1 1000m	6 December
52	Silver	Kenneth Chua; Patrick Nuqui; Frederick Ong; Merwin Tan	Bowling	Men's team of 4	6 December
53	Silver	Alvin Barbero; Jefrey Roda	Billiards	Men's snooker doubles	6 December
54	Silver	Luke Miguel Gebbie; Jarod Jason Hatch; Maurice Sacho Ilustre; Jean Pierre Sameh Khouzam	Swimming	Men's 4x100m freestyle relay	6 December
55	Silver	Rene Catalan	Sambo	Men's Combat 57kg	6 December
56	Silver	Ojay Fuentes; Hermie Macaranas	Canoeing	Men's canoeing & Kayaking C2 200m	7 December
57	Silver	Christiana Means	Skateboarding	Women's Street	7 December
58	Silver	Ruben Gonzales Jr. Treat Huey	Tennis	Men's doubles	7 December
59	Silver	Rinna Babanto; Dustin Mella	Taekwondo	Mixed Recognized Pair Poomsae	7 December
60	Silver	Juvenile Faye Crisostomo; Marvin Mori; Janna Dominique Oliva; Patrick King Perez; Darius Venerable	Taekwondo	Mixed Freestyle Team Poomsae	7 December
61	Silver	Norman Montalvo	Karate	Men's kumite -55kg	7 December
62	Silver	Chloe Isleta	Swimming	Women's 100m backstroke	7 December
63	Silver	Jasmine Alkhaldi; Xiandi Chua; Nicole Justine Marie Oliva; Remedy Rule	Swimming	Women's 4x100m freestyle relay	7 December
64	Silver	Gie Lyn Boyano; Jem Ferrer	Sailing	Women's international 420	7 December
65	Silver	Rinna Babanto; Aidaine Laxa; Jocel Ninobla	Taekwondo	Women's Recognized Team Poomsae	7 December
66	Silver	Janna Oliva	Taekwondo	Women's Poomsae	7 December
67	Silver	Rubilen Amit	Billiards	Women's 10-ball Pool Singles	7 December
68	Silver	Renzo Mark Feliciano	Skateboarding	Men's Street	7 December
69	Silver	Rey Aliling; Jerome Bacarisas; Leo Barredo; Denmark Bathan; Jasper Cabrera; Melvin De Castro; Julius Diaz; Kim Carlo Garcia; Francis Generoso; John Norwen Lucas; Marlon Pagkaliwagan; Michael Pagkaliwagan; Reagan Parco; Gerone Riparip; Apolonio Rosales; Justine John Rosales	Softball	Men's team	8 December
70	Silver	Rogelio Esquievel Jr.	Surfing	Men's Longboard	8 December
71	Silver	Jervy Agudo	Surfing	Women's Longboard	8 December
72	Silver	Samantha Bermudez	Water skiing	Women's Wakeboard	8 December
73	Silver	Raphael Trinidad	Water skiing	Men's Wakeboard	8 December
74	Silver	Jenelyn Olsim	Muay Thai	Women's 54kg	8 December
75	Silver	Erika Bomogao	Muay Thai	Women's 45kg	8 December
76	Silver	Agot Danton; Aldee Faith Lyde Denuyo; Patrocinia Duffy; Helena Roxanne Indigne; Nicole Kovanen; Erica Mae Legaspi; Ada Milby; Auimi Ono; Anna Beatrix Pacis; Jacquiline Mae Rodriguez; Rassiel Sales; Sylvia Tudoc	Rugby 7's	Women's team	8 December
77	Silver	Duke Raphael Pandeagua	Skateboarding	Men's downhill	8 December
78	Silver	Kristina Knott	Athletics	Women's 100m	8 December
79	Silver	Chezka Centeno	Billiards	Women's 9-ball Pool Singles	8 December
80	Silver	Leila Delo	Taekwondo	Women's kyorugi welterweight 67kg	8 December
81	Silver	Kirstie Alora	Taekwondo	Women's Kyorugi Heavyweight +73kg	8 December
82	Silver	Kristopher Robert Uy	Taekwondo	Men's Kyorugi Heavyweight +87kg	8 December
83	Silver	Arven Alcantara	Taekwondo	Men's kyorugi featherweight 68kg	8 December
84	Silver	James Deiparine	Swimming	Men's 50m breaststroke	8 December
85	Silver	Jasmine Alkhaldi; Chloe Isleta; Desirae Mangaoang; Remedy Rule	Swimming	Swimming - Women's 4x100m medley relay	8 December
86	Silver	Mariano Masano	Athletics	Men's 1500m	8 December
87	Silver	Ryan Jakiri	Muay Thai	Men's 63.5kg	8 December
88	Silver	Irish Magno	Boxing	Women's Flyweight 51kg	9 December
89	Silver	Marc Alexander Lim	Jujitsu	Men's 69kg	9 December
90	Silver	Jenna Kaila Napolis	Jujitsu	Women's 49kg	9 December
91	Silver	Margarito Angana Jr.	Wrestling	Men's Greco-Roman 60kg	9 December
92	Silver	Jason Balabal	Wrestling	Men's Greco-Roman 87kg	9 December
93	Silver	Michael Vijay Carter	Wrestling	Men's Greco-Roman 55kg	9 December
94	Silver	Jiah Pingot	Wrestling	Women's freestyle 50kg	9 December
95	Silver	Marjon Piañar	Boxing	Men's welterweight 69kg	9 December
96	Silver	Riza Pasuit	Boxing	Women's Lightweight 60kg	9 December
97	Silver	Carter James Lilly	Athletics	Men's 800m	9 December
98	Silver	Kristina Knott; Zion Nelson; Kayla Richardson; Kyla Richardson	Athletics	Women's 4x100m Relay	9 December
99	Silver	Jomar Balangui	Kickboxing	Men's Low Kick 54kg	9 December
100	Silver	Renalyn Dacquel	Kickboxing	Women's Full Contact 48kg	9 December
101	Silver	Rheza Aragon	Taekwondo	Women's kyorugi flyweight 49kg	9 December
102	Silver	Jewel Napa	Wind surfing	Men's RS X Event	9 December
103	Silver	Reymark Begornia; Christopher Buraga; Robert Andrew Garcia; David William Pelino	Squash	Men's team	9 December
104	Silver	Daniel Caluag	Cycling	Men's BMX Race	10 December
105	Silver	Carlos Carag	Shooting	Men's Trap	10 December
106	Silver	Luidi Ladera	Jujitsu	Men's 94kg	10 December
107	Silver	Mark Harry Diones	Athletics	Men's triple jump	10 December
108	Silver	William Morrison III	Athletics	Men's discus throw	10 December
109	Silver	Joida Gagnao	Athletics	Women's 3000m Steeplechase	10 December
110	Silver	Alnakran Abdilla; Mark Gil Alfafara; Bryan Bagunas; John Vic De Guzman; Marck Espejo; Rex Emmanuel Intal; Jack Kalingking; Jessie Lopez; Kim Niño Malabunga; Ricky Marcos; Esmilzo Joner Polvorosa; Ave Joshua Retamar; Francis Saura; Joshua Umandal	Volleyball	Men's team	10 December
111	Silver	Alvin Lobreguito	Wrestling	Men's freestyle 57kg	10 December
112	Silver	Jhonny Morte	Wrestling	Men's freestyle 65kg	10 December
113	Silver	Ronil Tubog	Wrestling	Men's freestyle 61kg	10 December
114	Silver	Minalyn Foy-os	Wrestling	Women's freestyle 55kg	10 December
115	Silver	Joseph Angana	Wrestling	Men's freestyle 70kg	10 December
116	Silver	Noemi Tener	Wrestling	Women's freestyle 62kg	10 December
117	Silver	Alexandre "AK" Laverez	Esports	Tekken 7	10 December

=== Bronze ===
No.	Medal	Name	Sport	Event	Date
1	Bronze	Daniel Parantac	Wushu	Men's taolu Taijiquan	1 December
2	Bronze	Avegail Rombaon	Cycling	Women's Mountain Biking Cross-country	1 December
3	Bronze	Mary Flor Diaz	Weightlifting	Women's 45kg	1 December
4	Bronze	EJ Flores	Cycling	Men's Mountain Biking Cross-country	1 December
5	Bronze	Haden Skye Alysabeth Bates; Kieran Scout Nicole Bates; Monica Estelle Chernoff; Krystal Rae Dela Cruz; Hannah Maire Fonacier; Carla Beatriz Grabador; Christine Grace Hipol; Jobelyn Ocampo; Nadia Paquin; Gabriella Sicat	Water polo	Women's team	1 December
6	Bronze	Eza Rai Yalong	Arnis	Women's Livestick Lightweight	1 December
7	Bronze	Erlin Mae Busacay	Arnis	Women's Livestick Welterweight	1 December
8	Bronze	Helen Dawa	Kurash	Women's 52kg	1 December
9	Bronze	Jason Senales	Kurash	Men's 90kg	1 December
10	Bronze	Sydney Sy	Kurash	Women's +70kg	2 December
11	Bronze	Lloyd Dennis Catipon	Kurash	Men's 73kg	2 December
12	Bronze	Al Rolan Llamas	Kurash	Men's 66kg	2 December
13	Bronze	Vilma Greenlees; Nenita Tabiano	Lawn bowls	Women's pairs	2 December
14	Bronze	Johnzenth Gajo; Jones Inso; Thornton Quieney Lou Sayan	Wushu	Men's taolu duilian	3 December
15	Bronze	Nestor Colonia	Weightlifting	Men's 67kg	3 December
16	Bronze	Samantha Kyle Catantan	Fencing	Women's individual Foil	3 December
17	Bronze	Jemyca Aribado	Squash	Women's singles	3 December
18	Bronze	Jemyca Aribado; Jimmie Avilla; Alyssa Yvonne	Squash	Women's team	3 December
19	Bronze	Mark Julius Rodelas	Obstacle Racing	Men's 100m	4 December
20	Bronze	Leoncio Carreon; Curte Robert Guarin; Ronald Lising; Emmanuel Portacio	Lawn bowls	Men's fours	4 December
21	Bronze	Marc Joseph Gonzales	Short track speed skating	Men's 1000m	4 December
22	Bronze	Nathaniel Perez	Fencing	Men's individual Foil	4 December
23	Bronze	Jasmine Alkhaldi	Swimming	Women's 100m freestyle	4 December
24	Bronze	Dines Dumaan	Pencak silat	Men's Tanding Match Class B 50-55kg	4 December
25	Bronze	Emmanuel Comendador; Mary Pauline Fornea; Efraim Iñigo; Monica Torres	Duathlon	Mixed Events Relay	5 December
26	Bronze	Carlo Biado; Johann Chua	Billiards	Men's 9-ball Pool Doubles	5 December
27	Bronze	Jeffrey Ignacio; Warren Kiamco	Billiards	Men's 9-ball Pool Doubles	5 December
28	Bronze	Noelito Jose Jr.	Fencing	Men's individual Epee	5 December
29	Bronze	Khrizzie Pabulayan	Judo	Women's Combat 52kg	5 December
30	Bronze	Keisei Nakano	Judo	Men's Combat 73kg	5 December
31	Bronze	Patrick Paul Manicad	Sambo	Men's Combat 82kg	5 December
32	Bronze	Niño Mondejar III	Sambo	Men's Combat 90kg	5 December
33	Bronze	Roy Aldous Arayata; Jonathan Bejar; Alexander Colet; Ramon Jorge; Cesar Marasigan III; Ricardo Tobias Papa; Reynaldo Paras; Jasper Parulan; Christopher Policarpo; David Quiec; Kelvin Tan; Francis Robert Yanga	Underwater hockey	Men's 6x6	5 December
34	Bronze	Rena Furukawa	Judo	Women's Combat 57kg	5 December
35	Bronze	Jasmine Alkhaldi; Xiandi Chua; Nicole Justine Marie Oliva; Remedy Rule	Swimming	Women's 4x200m freestyle relay	5 December
36	Bronze	Ammiel Elijah Bardaje; Joshua Gleen Bullo; Mark Joseph Gonzales; Jason Huerte; Joeart Jumawan; John Jeffrey Morcillos; Elly Jan Nituda; Rheyjey Ortouste; Vince Alyson Torno	Sepak Takraw	Men's team Doubles	5 December
37	Bronze	Jeson Patrombon	Tennis	Men's singles	6 December
38	Bronze	Alberto Lim Jr.	Tennis	Men's singles	6 December
39	Bronze	Princess Honey Arbilon	Modern Pentathlon	Women's Beach Triathlete	6 December
40	Bronze	Dzi Gervacio; Bernadeth Pons; Floremel Rodriguez; Sisi Rondina	Volleyball	Women's Beach Team	6 December
41	Bronze	Samantha Kyle Catantan; Maxine Esteban; Wilhelmina Lozada; Justine Gail Tinio	Fencing	Women's team Foil	6 December
42	Bronze	Eric Brando II; CJ Concepcion; Donnie Navarro; Daniel Villanueva	Fencing	Men's team sabre	6 December
43	Bronze	Edmar Bonono; James Buytrago; Jude Garcia; Jaron Requinton	Volleyball	Men's Beach Team	6 December
44	Bronze	Efren Reyes	Billiards	Men's 1-Cushion Carom	6 December
45	Bronze	Francisco Pili Dela Cruz	Billiards	Men's 1-Cushion Carom	6 December
46	Bronze	Bea Hernandez; Liza Del Rosario; Alexis Sy; Lara Posadas-Wong	Bowling	Women's team of 4	6 December
47	Bronze	Carl Aseneta	Judo	Men's Combat 90kg	6 December
48	Bronze	John Viron Ferrer	Judo	Men's Combat 100kg	6 December
49	Bronze	Shin Matsumura	Judo	Men's Combat +100kg	6 December
50	Bronze	Ryoko Salinas	Judo	Women's Combat +78kg	6 December
51	Bronze	Remedy Rule	Swimming	Women's 200m freestyle	6 December
52	Bronze	Chloe Isleta	Swimming	Women's 200m backstroke	6 December
53	Bronze	Helen Aclopen; Renzo Cazeñas; Patrick Dos Santos; Jedd Andre Kim; Mariane Mariano	Sambo	Mixed Team	6 December
54	Bronze	Daniela Dela Pisa	Gymnastics	Rhythmic Ball	7 December
55	Bronze	Daniela Dela Pisa	Gymnastics	Rhythmic Clubs	7 December
56	Bronze	John Mark Camingao; Jan Paul Morales; George Oconer; Ronald Oranza	Cycling	Men's Road Cycling Team Time Trial	7 December
57	Bronze	Shawn Felipe; Michael Nicanor; Nathaniel Perez; Jaime Viceo	Fencing	Men's team Foil	7 December
58	Bronze	John Enrico Vasquez	Karate	Men's kata individual	7 December
59	Bronze	Sarah Pangilinan	Karate	Women's kata individual	7 December
60	Bronze	Carl Dave Aseneta; Lloyd Dennis Catipon; Jackielou Agon Escarpe; John Viron Ferrer; Shin Matsumura; Daryl Mercado; Kodo Nakano; Bryan Quillotes; Rick Jayson Senales; Marco Tumampad	Judo	Men's Combat Team	7 December
61	Bronze	Megumi Delgado; Ma. Jeanalane Lopez; Jenielou Mosqueda; Khrizzie Pabulayan; Ryoko Salinas; Mariya Takahashi; Kiyomi Watanabe	Judo	Women's Combat Team	7 December
62	Bronze	Princess Arbilion; Michael Comaling	Modern Pentathlon	Mixed Beach Triathlete Relay	7 December
63	Bronze	Jean Caluscusin; Andrea Mae Emperado; Katrina Loretizo; AJ Melgar; Devina Sembrano	Gymnastics	Rhythmic Group All-around	7 December
64	Bronze	Jasmine Alkhaldi	Swimming	Women's 50m butterfly	7 December
65	Bronze	Jasmine Alkhaldi	Swimming	Women's 100m backstroke	7 December
66	Bronze	Brandhon Aquino; Jericko Marbella	Sailing	Men's international 420	7 December
67	Bronze	Edgardo Alejan Jr. Raymond Alferos; Robyn Lauren Brown; Maureen Schrijvers	Athletics	Mixed Team 4x400m Relay	7 December
68	Bronze	Raquel Almencion; Lealyn Baligasa; Joanna Barca; Christian Burgos; Norwell Cajes; Edmund Catapang; John Lester delos Santos; Rosalyn Esguerra; Mark Jhon Frias; Ava Kryszle Gako; Maria Theresa Mofar; Reymart Nevado; Daniel Ortega; Leojane Remarim; Rhea Roa; Pantaleon Roberto; Jonathan Ruz; John Paul Selencio; Jerome Solis; Christine Mae Talledo	Canoeing	Traditional Boat Racing Mixed 22-seater 200m	7 December
69	Bronze	Roque Abala Jr. Edgar Ilas	Rowing	Men's lightweight double sculls	8 December
70	Bronze	Daisy Valdez	Surfing	Women's Longboard	8 December
71	Bronze	Daisy Valdez	Surfing	Women's Shortboard	8 December
72	Bronze	John Mark Tokong	Surfing	Men's Shortboard	8 December
73	Bronze	Christian Joson	Water skiing	Men's Wakeskate	8 December
74	Bronze	Ralph Villaro	Water skiing	Men's Wakeboard	8 December
75	Bronze	Rydelle Abarico	Skateboarding	Women's downhill	8 December
76	Bronze	Jasmine Alkhaldi	Swimming	Women's 50m freestyle	8 December
77	Bronze	Luis Castro; Aidric Chan; Sean Ramos	Golf	Men's team	8 December
78	Bronze	Samuel James Bengzon; Javier Alfonso Gabriel Cadiz; John Steven Fuglister; Francisco Emmanuel Gautier; Benjamin Jorge Imperial; Gianpetro Iseppi; Lenard Rigel Lancero II; Carl Michael Montano; Danilo Pastrana Jr. Jan Aro Regencia; Miguel Alfonso Relampagos; Jon David Samson; Eishner Jigsmac Sibug; Geffrey So; Paolo Spafford; Kenneth Mitchell Stern; Patrick Russell Syquiatco; Carlo Martin Tenedero; Carlo Angelo Tigaronita; Richmond Yu	Ice Hockey	Men's team	8 December
79	Bronze	Princess Catindig; Erdilyn Peralta	Soft tennis	Women's doubles	8 December
80	Bronze	Jayson Macaalay	Karate	Men's kumite -60kg	8 December
81	Bronze	Ivan Christopher Agustin	Karate	Men's kumite -75kg	8 December
82	Bronze	Sharief Afif	Karate	Men's kumite +75kg	8 December
83	Bronze	Nicole Erika Dantes; Ronaldene Aletheia Flores; Rebecca Cyril Torres	Karate	Women's Kata Team	8 December
84	Bronze	Adam Bondoc; Mark Andrew Manantan; John Enrico Vasquez	Karate	Men's Kata Team	8 December
85	Bronze	Joane Orbon	Karate	Women's kumite -61kg	8 December
86	Bronze	Mae Soriano	Karate	Women's kumite -55kg	8 December
87	Bronze	Kim Robert Miranda	Muay Thai	Men's 45kg	8 December
88	Bronze	Alexis Mayag	Muay Thai	Men's 48kg	8 December
89	Bronze	Raquel Almencion; John Niña Andrade; Lealyn Baligasa; Joanna Barca; Arche Baylosis; Christian Burgos; Patricia Ann Bustamante; Norwell Cajes; Maribeth Caranto; Edmund Catapang; Roda Daban; John Lester delos Santos; Bernadette Espeña; Mark Jhon Frias; Ojay Fuentes; Ava Kryszle Gako; Aidelyn Lustre; Hermie Macaranas; Reymart Nevado; Rhea Roa	Canoeing	Traditional Boat Racing Mixed 22-seater 500m	8 December
90	Bronze	Kemberly Camahalan; Allaine Cortey; Queen Dalmacio; Jylyn Nicanor	Fencing	Women's team sabre	
91	Bronze	Jonel Carcueva; El Joshua Cariño; Marcelo Felipe; Ismael Grospe Jr. Jun Rey Navarra	Cycling	Men's Road Cycling Team Road Race	8 December
92	Bronze	Diogenes Avila	Shooting	Metallic Silhouette Air Rifle	8 December
93	Bronze	Sonny Wagdos	Athletics	Men's 5000m	9 December
94	Bronze	Charmaine Dolar	Gymnastics	Women's Aerobic Individual	9 December
95	Bronze	Benjamin Eusebio; Antonio Jose; Stefano Juban; Michael Odylon Romero	Polo	0-2 Low Goal	9 December
96	Bronze	Gian Taylor Dee	Jujitsu	Men's 62kg	9 December
97	Bronze	Ian Clark Bautista	Boxing	Men's Bantamweight 56kg	9 December
98	Bronze	Luke Michael Gebbie	Swimming	Men's 50m freestyle	9 December
99	Bronze	Jasmine Alkhaldi	Swimming	Women's 100m butterfly	9 December
100	Bronze	Jefferson Manatad	Wrestling	Men's Greco-Roman 77kg	9 December
101	Bronze	Veronica Garces	Taekwondo	Women's Kyorugi Finweight 46kg	9 December
102	Bronze	Jessica Canabal	Taekwondo	Women's Kyorugi Bantamweight 53kg	9 December
103	Bronze	Dex Ian Chavez	Taekwondo	Men's kyorugi flyweight 58kg	9 December
104	Bronze	Kurt Pajuelas	Taekwondo	Men's Kyorugi Bantamweight 63kg	9 December
105	Bronze	Aira Villegas	Boxing	Women's Bantamweight 54kg	9 December
106	Bronze	Apryl Eppinger	Jujitsu	Women's 62kg	10 December
107	Bronze	Peter Meimban	Jujitsu	Men's 120kg	10 December
108	Bronze	Joida Gagnao	Athletics	Women's 5000m	10 December
109	Bronze	Robyn Lauren Brown	Athletics	Women's 400m hurdles	10 December
110	Bronze	Karol Maguide	Kickboxing	Men's Full Contact 51kg	10 December
111	Bronze	Janry Ubas	Athletics	Men's Decathlon	10 December
112	Bronze	Clinton Bautista; Eric Cray; Anfernee Lopena; Francis Medina	Athletics	Men's 4x100m Relay	10 December
113	Bronze	Edgardo Alejan Jr. Michael Carlo del Prado; Frederick Ramirez; Joyme Sequita	Athletics	Men's 4x400m Relay	10 December
114	Bronze	Robyn Lauren Brown; Jessel Lumapas; Eloiza Luzon; Maureen Emily Schrijvers	Athletics	Women's 4x400m Relay	10 December
115	Bronze	Andreij "Doujin" Albar	Esports	Tekken 7	10 December
116	Bronze	Richard Gonzales	Table tennis	Men's singles	10 December
117	Bronze	Jefrey Roda	Billiards	Men's snooker singles	10 December
118	Bronze	Maria Paulyn Castillo; Morticia Blair Castro; Kyle Delos Santos; Paula Jean Dumaplin; Rafaela Landicho; Angela Thea Laraya; Jaylene Mae Lumbo; Jevilyn Obasa; Andrea Maria Parungao; Denizelle Ann Rasing; Yarra Austine Sebastian; Yvonne Mae Tasis	Indoor hockey	Women's team	10 December
119	Bronze	John John Bobier; Ronsited Gabayeron; Jason Huerte; Rheyjey Ortouste	Sepak Takraw	Men's regu	10 December
120	Bronze	Allyssa Bandoy; Abegail Sinogbuhan; Jean Marie Sucalit; Mary Melody Taming	Sepak Takraw	Women's regu	10 December
121	Bronze	Van Jacob Baccay; Mark Dubouzet; Andrew Michael Harris; Manuel Lasangue Jr. Jamael Pangandaman; John Michael Pasco; Rey Joshua Tabuzo; Josef Valdez; Dhane Varela; Daryoush Zandi	Beach handball	Men's team	11 December

=== Demonstration Sport ===
Medals earned on a Demonstration Sport is not counted on the medal haul

Medal	Name	Sport	Event	Date
Gold	John Emmanuel Garcia	Chess	Online Chess	1 December
Silver	Janell Mae Frayna; Shania Mendoza; Catherine Secopito	Chess	Women's Problem Solving Team	5 December
Silver	Paulo Bersamina; Darwin Laylo; Eugene Torre	Chess	Men's Problem Solving Team	5 December

== Multiple medalists ==
Rank	Athlete	Sport	Gold	Silver	Bronze	Total
1	Sean Mischa Aranar	Dancesport	3			3
1	Ana Leonila Nualla	Dancesport	3			3
1	Wilbert Aunzo	Dancesport	3			3
1	Pearl Marie Cañeda	Dancesport	3			3
5	Carlos Yulo	Artistic Gymnastics	2	5		7
6	Kristina Knott	Athletics	2	2		4
7	Mark Jayson Gayon	Dancesport	2	1		3
7	Mary Joy Renigen	Dancesport	2	1		3
7	Michael Angelo Marquez	Dancesport	2	1		3
7	Stephanie Sabalo	Dancesport	2	1		3
11	John Leerams Chicano	Triathlon	2			2
11	Kim Mangrobang	Triathlon	2			2
11	Agatha Chrystenzen Wong	Wushu	2			2
11	Bianca Pagdanganan	Golf	2			2
11	Bien Zoleta-Mañalac	Soft Tennis	2			2
11	Margielyn Didal	Skateboarding	2			2
11	Jack Danielle Animam	Basketball	2			2
11	Afril Bernardino	Basketball	2			2
11	Clare Castro	Basketball	2			2
11	Janine Pontejos	Basketball	2			2
11	Marly Martir	Shooting	2			2
11	Melcah Caballero	Rowing	2			2
11	Ridgely Balladares	Sailing	2			2
11	Rubin Cruz Jr.	Sailing	2			2
11	Whok Dimapilis	Sailing	2			2
11	Richly Magsanay	Sailing	2			2
11	Joel Mejarito	Sailing	2			2
11	Edgar Villapaña	Sailing	2			2
11	Rodolfo Reyes Jr.	Taekwondo	2			2
30	Christiana Means	Skateboarding	1	2		3
31	Hanniel Abella	Fencing	1	1		2
31	Chezka Centeno	Billiards	1	1		2
31	James Deiparine	Swimming	1	1		2
31	Jermyn Prado	Cycling	1	1		2
31	Jocel Ninobla	Taekwondo	1	1		2
31	Samuel German	Modern Pentathlon	1	1		2
37	Daniela Dela Pisa	Rhythmic Gymnastics	1		2	3
38	Monica Torres	Duathlon	1		1	2
38	Jylyn Nicanor	Fencing	1		1	2
38	Kiyomi Watanabe	Judo	1		1	2
38	Mariya Takahashi	Judo	1		1	2
38	Michael Comaling	Modern Pentathlon	1		1	2
38	Jason Huerte	Sepak Takraw	1		1	2
38	Jemyca Aribado	Squash	1		1	2
38	Jeson Patrombon	Tennis	1		1	2
46	Remedy Rule	Swimming		3	2	5
47	Jasmine Alkhaldi	Swimming		2	6	8
48	Chloe Isleta	Swimming		2	1	3
49	Hermie Macaranas	Canoeing		2		2
49	Rinna Babanto	Taekwondo		2		2
51	Tomas Vicente Bitong	Polo		1	1	2
51	Stefano Juban	Polo		1	1	2
51	Eduardo Miguel Lopez	Polo		1	1	2
51	Augustus Aguirre	Polo		1	1	2
51	Nicole Justine Marie Oliva	Swimming		1	1	2
51	Xiandi Chua	Swimming		1	1	2
51	Alexander Colet	Underwater Hockey		1	1	2
51	Cesar Marasigan III	Underwater Hockey		1	1	2
51	Chari May Ongyanco	Underwater Hockey		1	1	2
51	Christopher Policarpo	Underwater Hockey		1	1	2
51	David Quiec	Underwater Hockey		1	1	2
51	Francis Robert Yanga	Underwater Hockey		1	1	2
51	Ivy Canlas	Underwater Hockey		1	1	2
51	Jacklyn Joyce Chua	Underwater Hockey		1	1	2
51	Jasper Parulan	Underwater Hockey		1	1	2
51	Jelyn Baldonado	Underwater Hockey		1	1	2
51	Johanna Uy	Underwater Hockey		1	1	2
51	Jonathan Bejar	Underwater Hockey		1	1	2
51	JV Christabelle Lim	Underwater Hockey		1	1	2
51	JV Kristine Lim	Underwater Hockey		1	1	2
51	Karen Anne Naguit	Underwater Hockey		1	1	2
51	Kelvin Tan	Underwater Hockey		1	1	2
51	Maria Ines Templo	Underwater Hockey		1	1	2
51	Mary Bridget Josef	Underwater Hockey		1	1	2
51	Micheline Uy	Underwater Hockey		1	1	2
51	Nandja Buenafe	Underwater Hockey		1	1	2
51	Ramon Jorge	Underwater Hockey		1	1	2
51	Reynaldo Paras	Underwater Hockey		1	1	2
51	Ricardo Tobias Papa	Underwater Hockey		1	1	2
51	Roy Aldous Arayata	Underwater Hockey		1	1	2
51	Jones Inso	Wushu		1	1	2
82	Nathaniel Perez	Fencing			2	2
82	Khrizzie Pabulayan	Judo			2	2
82	John Viron Ferrer	Judo			2	2
82	Shin Matsumura	Judo			2	2
82	Ryoko Salinas	Judo			2	2
82	Lloyd Dennis Catipon	Kurash			2	2
82	Daisy Valdez	Surfing			2	2

== Medal summary ==
=== By sports ===
Sport	1st place, gold medalist(s)	2nd place, silver medalist(s)	3rd place, bronze medalist(s)	Total	Rank
Archery	1	0	0	1	5
Arnis	14	4	2	20	1
Athletics	11	8	8	27	3
Baseball	1	0	0	1	1
Basketball	4	0	0	4	1
Beach handball	0	0	1	1	3
Billiards	4	3	5	12	1
Bowling	0	1	1	2	5
Boxing	7	3	2	12	1
Canoeing	1	2	2	5	5
Cycling	3	4	4	10	2
Dancesport	10	2	0	12	1
Duathlon	1	1	1	3	1
Esports	3	1	1	5	1
Fencing	2	2	7	11	3
Figure Skating	0	2	0	2	3
Golf	2	0	1	3	1
Gymnastics	3	5	4	12	3
Ice Hockey	0	0	1	1	3
Indoor Hockey	0	0	1	1	4
Judo	3	1	9	13	3
Ju-jitsu	5	3	3	11	1
Karate	2	1	9	12	5
Kickboxing	3	2	1	6	2
Kurash	1	2	5	8	3
Lawn Bowls	1	3	2	6	2
Modern Pentathlon	2	1	2	5	2
Muay Thai	3	4	2	9	2
Obstacle Racing	6	3	1	10	1
Pencak Silat	1	2	1	4	4
Polo	0	1	1	2	3
Rowing	3	0	1	4	2
Rugby Sevens	1	1	0	2	1
Sailing	3	1	1	5	2
Sambo	2	1	3	6	2
Sepak Takraw	2	0	3	5	2
Shooting	3	3	1	7	3
Short Track Speed Skating	0	0	1	1	5
Skateboarding	6	4	1	11	1
Softball	1	1	0	2	1
Soft Tennis	3	0	1	4	1
Squash	1	2	2	5	2
Surfing	2	2	3	7	1
Swimming	1	6	9	16	5
Table Tennis	0	0	1	1	5
Taekwondo	8	9	4	21	1
Tennis	1	1	2	4	3
Triathlon	3	2	0	5	1
Underwater Hockey	0	3	1	4	2
Volleyball	0	1	2	3	3
Water Polo	0	1	1	2	3
Water Skiing	2	2	2	6	2
Weightlifting	2	3	2	7	3
Windsurfing	2	1	0	3	1
Wrestling	2	10	1	13	2
Wushu	7	2	2	11	1
Total	149	117	121	387	1/11

=== By date ===
Day	Date	1st place, gold medalist(s)	2nd place, silver medalist(s)	3rd place, bronze medalist(s)	Total
1	1 December	22	12	9	43
2	2 December	16	8	4	28
3	3 December	9	10	3	22
4	4 December	9	12	6	27
5	5 December	10	6	17	33
6	6 December	8	7	15	30
7	7 December	18	11	14	43
8	8 December	23	20	22	65
9	9 December	23	15	12	50
10	10 December	12	12	18	42
11	11 December	0	0	1	1
Total		149	117	121	387

== Aquatics ==
27 athletes will compete for the Philippines in swimming events of the 2019 Southeast Asian Games. 14 of them are male and 13 of them are female. Sherwyn Santiago will serve as the coach for the men's team while Jenny Guerrero will coach the women's team.

== Basketball ==
The Philippine men's national basketball team will be coached by Tim Cone. Yeng Guiao was expected to coach the national team but resigned after the conclusion of the 2019 FIBA Basketball World Cup. The official 24-man roster for the Southeast Asian Games is expected to be submitted in August 2019 which is to be composed of a mixture of both amateur and professional players. Guiao has stated that he would not call up naturalized player, Andray Blatche or Jordan Clarkson assessing that there is a deep enough pool to choose players from to form a competitive team that could contend for the gold medal. 17 players from the Philippine FIBA World Cup national training pool as of mid-August 2019 is also guaranteed a slot in the 24-man squad for the Southeast Asian Games.

=== Roster ===
Philippines national basketball team – 2019 Southeast Asian Games roster
Players
Coaches

Pos.	No.	Name	Age – Date of birth	Height	Club	Ctr.
G	1	Kiefer Ravena	26 – 27 October 1993	1.83 m (6 ft 0 in)	NLEX Road Warriors	(Philippines)
PF	4	Vic Manuel	32 – 18 May 1987	1.99 m (6 ft 6 in)	Alaska Aces	(Philippines)
G	5	LA Tenorio	35 – 9 July 1984	1.73 m (5 ft 8 in)	Barangay Ginebra San Miguel	(Philippines)
C	9	Greg Slaughter	31 – 19 May 1988	2.13 m (7 ft 0 in)	Barangay Ginebra San Miguel	(Philippines)
G	11	Stanley Pringle	32 – 5 June 1987	1.85 m (6 ft 1 in)	Barangay Ginebra San Miguel	(Philippines)
G	12	Chris Ross	34 – 9 March 1985	1.88 m (6 ft 2 in)	San Miguel Beermen	(Philippines)
SG	13	Marcio Lassiter	32 – 16 September 1987	1.90 m (6 ft 3 in)	San Miguel Beermen	(Philippines)
C	15	June Mar Fajardo	30 – 17 November 1989	2.08 m (6 ft 10 in)	San Miguel Beermen	(Philippines)
SF	18	Troy Rosario	27 – 20 January 1992	2.01 m (6 ft 7 in)	TNT KaTropa	(Philippines)
F/C	25	Japeth Aguilar	32 – 25 January 1987	2.06 m (6 ft 9 in)	Barangay Ginebra San Miguel	(Philippines)
F/C	34	Christian Standhardinger	30 – 4 July 1989	2.03 m (6 ft 8 in)	NorthPort Batang Pier	(Philippines)
G	35	Matthew Wright	26 – 7 February 1993	1.93 m (6 ft 4 in)	Phoenix Pulse Fuel Masters	(Philippines)

Head coach

- (Philippines) Tim Cone

Assistant coach(es)

- (Philippines) Jimmy Alapag
- (Philippines) Jong Uichico
- (Philippines) Joe Devance

Legend

- (C) Team captain
- Club – describes last
  club before the tournament
- Age – describes age
  on 4 December 2019

== Esports ==
The Philippine Southeast Asian Games E-sports Union, the organizing body for the esport event of the 2019 Southeast Asian Games has dubbed the Philippine national esports team as Sibol (transl. Growth). In late July 2019, the organization announced a training pool for the Sibol national team and is set to organize qualifying tournaments for additional pool members in August 2019. The qualifiers are to be participated by invited players from the country's professional esports teams and was also made open to additional competitors who are Filipino citizens of at least 13 years of age. The Philippines, as host will participate in all 6 esports events with each event to be participated by 7 players, except for Tekken, Hearthstone, and StarCraft II which will consist of two players each.

== Obstacle racing ==
16 athletes will represent the Philippines in obstacle racing.

== Skateboarding ==
Eleven athletes will compete for the Philippines in skateboarding including Margielyn Didal, Christiana Means, and Jericho Francisco.

== Triathlon ==
Four athletes represented the Philippines in the triathlon events in this edition. They are John Leerams Chicano, Andrew Kim Remolino, Kim Mangrobang and Kim Kilgroe.

=== Individual ===
Athlete	Event	Swim (1.5 km)	Trans 1	Bike (40 km)	Trans 2	Run (10 km)	Total Time	Rank
John Chicano	Men's individual	21:19		1:00:07		31:04	1:53:26	1st place, gold medalist(s)
Andrew Kim Remolino	Men's individual	20:57		1:00:32		32:46	1:55:03	2nd place, silver medalist(s)
Kim Mangrobang	Women's individual	21:38		1:03:36		35:43	2:02:00	1st place, gold medalist(s)
Kimberly Kilgroe	Women's individual	21:43		1:03:32		38:45	2:05:02	2nd place, silver medalist(s)

=== Relay ===
Athlete	Event	Leg 1	Leg 2	Leg 3	Leg 4	Total Time	Rank
John Chicano	Mixed relay	23:53	—N/a			1:33:47	1st place, gold medalist(s)
Kim Mangrobang	Mixed relay	—N/a	21:41	—N/a		1:33:47	1st place, gold medalist(s)
Fernando Jose Casares	Mixed relay	—N/a		25:23	—N/a	1:33:47	1st place, gold medalist(s)
Maria Claire Adorna	Mixed relay	—N/a			22:50	1:33:47	1st place, gold medalist(s)

== Table Tennis ==
=== Singles ===
Athlete	Event	Preliminary round		Semifinal	Final	Rank
Athlete	Event	Round Robin	Rank	Semifinal	Final	Rank
Richard Gonzales	Men's singles	Oo Soe Min (MYA); W 4 – 1	1 Q	Clarence Chew (SGP); L 1 – 4	Did Not Advance	3rd place, bronze medalist(s)
Richard Gonzales	Men's singles	Lay Phakdey (LAO); W 4 – 1	1 Q	Clarence Chew (SGP); L 1 – 4	Did Not Advance	3rd place, bronze medalist(s)
Richard Gonzales	Men's singles	Nguyen Anh Tu (VIE); W 4 - 2	1 Q	Clarence Chew (SGP); L 1 – 4	Did Not Advance	3rd place, bronze medalist(s)
Jann Mari Nayre	Men's singles	Wong Qi Shen (MAS); W 4 – 1	2	Did Not Advance		
Jann Mari Nayre	Men's singles	Clarence Chew (SGP); L 3 – 4	2	Did Not Advance		
Rose Jean Fadol	Women's singles	Soe Yanadar (MYA); W 4 – 0	2	Did Not Advance		
Rose Jean Fadol	Women's singles	Suthasini Sawettabut (THA); L 1 – 4	2	Did Not Advance		
Jannah Romero	Women's singles	Tran Mai Ngoc (VIE); L 1 – 4	3	Did Not Advance		
Jannah Romero	Women's singles	Nanthana Komwong (THA); L 2 – 4	3	Did Not Advance		

=== Doubles ===
Athlete	Event	1/8 final	Quarterfinal	Semifinal	Final	Rank
Richard Gonzales; Japheth Adasa	Men's doubles	Vu Quang Hien (VIE); Dinh Anh Hoang (VIE); W 3 – 2	Josh Shao Han Chua (SGP); Pang Yew En Koen (SGP); L 0 – 3	Did Not Advance		
John Russel Misal; Jann Mari Nayre	Men's doubles	Passara Pattaratorn (THA); Panagitgun Yanapong (THA); L 0 – 3	Did Not Advance			
Emy Rose Dael; Jannah Romero	Women's doubles	Nguyen Dieu Khanh (VIE); Nguyen Thanh Thu (VIE); L 2 – 3	Did Not Advance			
Kheith Rhynne Cruz; Rose Jean Fadol	Women's doubles	Win Naing Naing (MYA); Soe Yanadar (MYA); W 3 – 0	Wong Xin Ru (SGP); Goi Rui Xuan (SGP); L 2 – 3	Did Not Advance		

== Volleyball ==
=== Beach volleyball ===
The 2019 Beach Volleyball delegates are Sisi Rondina, Bernadeth Pons, Dzi Gervacio, and Floremel Rodrigues. They will be part of the women's teams. For men's division, the teams compose of Edmar Bonono, Jude Garcia, Anthony Arbasto, and James Buytrago.

== Weightlifting ==
=== Men's ===
Athlete	Event	Snatch		Clean & Jerk		Total	Rank
Athlete	Event	Result	Rank	Result	Rank	Total	Rank
John Ceniza	Men's 55 kg	112	2	140	2	252	2nd place, silver medalist(s)
Dave Lloyd Pacaldo	Men's 61 kg	110	4	140	4	250	4
Nestor Colonia	Men's 67 kg	127	3	160	3	287	3rd place, bronze medalist(s)

=== Women's ===
Athlete	Event	Snatch		Clean & Jerk		Total	Rank
Athlete	Event	Result	Rank	Result	Rank	Total	Rank
Mary Flor Diaz	Women's 45 kg	70	4	89	3	159	3rd place, bronze medalist(s)
Elien Rose Perez	Women's 49 kg	75	4	96	4	171	4
Hidilyn Diaz	Women's 55 kg	91	1	120	1	211	1st place, gold medalist(s)
Margaret Colonia	Women's 59 kg	82	2	107	2	189	2nd place, silver medalist(s)
Elreen Ann Ando	Women's 64 kg	98	1	115	2	213	2nd place, silver medalist(s)
Kristel Macrohon	Women's 71 kg	93	2	123	1	216	1st place, gold medalist(s)
