= Triathlon at the 2019 SEA Games =

Triathlon competition at the 2019 SEA Games

- Location: Subic Bay Freeport Zone, Philippines
- Dates: 1–2 December
- Nations: 6

The triathlon competition at the 2019 SEA Games in the Philippines was held at the Subic Bay Freeport Zone. from 1 to 2 December 2019. The competitions were won by John Chicano and Kim Mangrobang, both of the Philippines.

== Competition schedule ==
The men's and women's individual race took place on 1 December 2019. The mixed relay event was originally scheduled to take place on 4 December 2019 but was rescheduled to take place earlier on 2 December 2019 due to the anticipated weather caused by Typhoon Kanmuri (Tisoy).

All times are Philippine Standard Time (UTC+8).

Date	Time	Event
Sun, 1 December	06:00	Men's individual
Sun, 1 December	08:00	Women's individual
Mon, 2 December	15:30	Mixed relay

== Medal summary ==
=== Medal table ===
* Host nation (Philippines)

Rank	Nation	Gold	Silver	Bronze	Total
1	Philippines (PHI)*	3	2	0	5
2	Singapore (SGP)	0	1	0	1
3	Indonesia (INA)	0	0	3	3
Totals (3 entries)		3	3	3	9

=== Events ===
Event	Gold	Silver	Bronze
Men's individual	John Leerams Chicano; Philippines	Andrew Kim Remolino; Philippines	Muhammad Ahlul Firman; Indonesia
Women's individual	Kim Mangrobang; Philippines	Kimberly Michelle Kligroe; Philippines	Nethavani Octaria; Indonesia
Mixed relay	Philippines (PHI); John Leerams Chicano; Kim Mangrobang; Fernando Jose Casares; Maria Claire Adorna	Singapore (SGP); Luke Chua Li Rong; Herlene Natasha Yu Zhihui; Bryce Chong Sheng Cher; Emma Ada Middleditch	Indonesia (INA); Muhammad Ahlul Firman; Nethavani Octaria; Jauhari Johan; Eva Desiana

== Participating nations ==
A total of athletes from 6 nations participated (the numbers of athletes are shown in parentheses).

- Indonesia (8)
- Malaysia (7)
- Philippines (11)
- Singapore (5)
- Thailand (6)
- Vietnam (12)

== Results ==
Swimming denotes the time it took the athlete to complete the swimming leg; cycling denotes the time it took the athlete to complete the cycling leg; running denotes the time it took the athlete to complete the running leg. The difference denotes the time difference between the athlete and the event winner. The total time includes both transitions.

=== Men's individual ===
Rank	#	Triathlete	Country	Swimming	Cycling	Running	Total time*	Difference
1st place, gold medalist(s)	1	John Chicano	Philippines	21:19	1:00:07	31:04	1:53:26	—
2nd place, silver medalist(s)	2	Andrew Kim Remolino	Philippines	20:57	1:00:32	32:46	1:55:03	+1:37
3rd place, bronze medalist(s)	5	Muhammad Ahlul Firman	Indonesia	21:15	1:00:10	34:47	1:57:10	+3:44
4	4	Clement Chow	Singapore	21:12	1:03:24	34:49	2:00:15	+6:49
5	7	Loo Chuan Rong	Singapore	21:22	1:03:19	35:56	2:01:35	+8:09
6	8	Aldrian Yeo	Malaysia	21:29	1:03:15	37:46	2:03:19	+9:53
7	10	Suphakit Sukatiphum	Thailand	23:45	1:03:59	35:06	2:03:40	+10:14
8	9	Lee Wen Jun	Malaysia	22:10	1:05:40	42:26	2:11:09	+17:43
9	11	Phan Văn Khoa	Vietnam	28:55	1:08:43	39:12	2:17:50	+24:24
10	3	Lê Hoàng Vũ	Vietnam	26:31	1:10:09	40:40	2:18:24	+24:58
11	6	Thanachat Kongudom	Thailand	—	—	—	DNS	—
Source: Official results

=== Women's individual ===
Rank	#	Triathlete	Country	Swimming	Cycling	Running	Total time*	Difference
1st place, gold medalist(s)	31	Kim Mangrobang	Philippines	21:38	1:03:36	35:43	2:02:00	—
2nd place, silver medalist(s)	32	Kimberly Kilgroe	Philippines	21:43	1:03:32	38:45	2:05:02	+3:02
3rd place, bronze medalist(s)	35	Nethavani Octaria	Indonesia	24:00	1:09:30	42:03	2:16:33	+14:33
4	33	Ethel Lin	Singapore	26:49	1:08:07	42:12	2:18:08	+16:08
5	34	Aimi Iwasaki Muhammad	Malaysia	26:37	1:08:15	43:37	2:19:29	+17:29
6	38	Nguyễn Thị Kim Tuyến	Vietnam	22:48	1:12:12	46:04	2:22:07	+20:07
7	37	Yang Chen Yin	Malaysia	24:19	1:15:27	44:29	2:25:17	+23:17
8	40	Phạm Thúy Vi	Vietnam	24:25	1:15:16	45:54	2:26:44	+24:44
9	39	Thipsuda Kammee	Thailand	21:44	1:12:18	58:01	2:32:57	+30:57
10	36	Chang Shuwen	Singapore	28:46	1:17:28	46:23	2:33:54	+31:54
Source: Official results
