= Surfing at the 2019 SEA Games =

- Venue: San Juan, La Union
- Dates: 2–8 December

Surfing at the 2019 Southeast Asian Games in the Philippines was held at waters off Barangay Urbiztondo in San Juan, La Union.

Surfing was held from 2 to 8 December 2019. There were concerns that surfing events were about to be suspended due to Typhoon Kammuri (Tisoy) affecting the waves in the venue.

Four gold medals were at stake in surfing; in men's and women's shortboard and in men's and women's longboard.

Roger Casugay gave up a gold medal position to save a fellow Indonesian competitor from drowning. Casugay, won hearts on social media with his kind deed, eventually won a rematch against Nurhidayat and bested fellow Filipino surfer Rogelio Esquivel for the gold medal.

== Participating nations ==
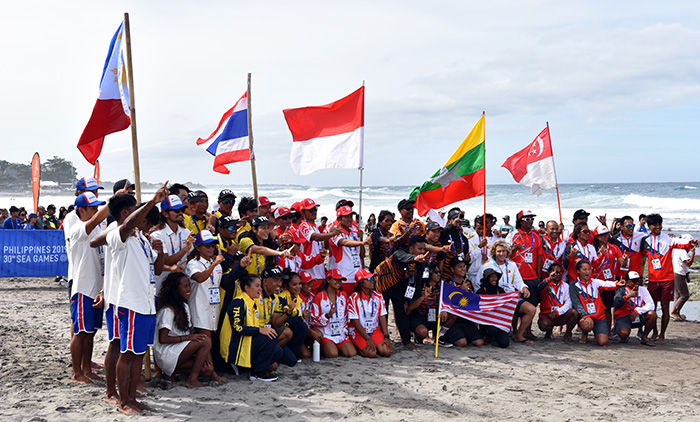
Competitors posing for a group photo during the formal opening of the surfing competition (2 December 2019)

Six nations participated in surfing.

- Indonesia
- Malaysia
- Myanmar
- Philippines
- Singapore
- Thailand

== Medal table ==
* Host nation (Philippines)

Rank	Nation	Gold	Silver	Bronze	Total
1	Philippines (PHI)*	2	2	3	7
2	Indonesia (INA)	2	1	3	6
3	Thailand (THA)	0	1	2	3
Totals (3 entries)		4	4	8	16

== Medalists ==
=== Men ===
Event	Gold	Silver	Bronze
Shortboard	Oney Anwar; Indonesia	Rio Waida; Indonesia	John Mark Tokong; Philippines
Shortboard	Oney Anwar; Indonesia	Rio Waida; Indonesia	Henry Sittipong Chapman; Thailand
Longboard	Roger Casugay; Philippines	Rogelio Esquievel; Philippines	Dean Permana; Indonesia
Longboard	Roger Casugay; Philippines	Rogelio Esquievel; Philippines	Arip Nurhidayat; Indonesia

=== Women ===
Event	Gold	Silver	Bronze
Shortboard	Nilbie Blancada; Philippines	Annissa Tita Flynn; Thailand	Daisy Valdez; Philippines
Shortboard	Nilbie Blancada; Philippines	Annissa Tita Flynn; Thailand	Tania Izquierdo; Indonesia
Longboard	Dhea Novitasari; Indonesia	Jevy Mae Agudo; Philippines	Daisy Valdez; Philippines
Longboard	Dhea Novitasari; Indonesia	Jevy Mae Agudo; Philippines	Athiya Junpraset; Thailand
