= Basketball at the 2019 SEA Games =

22nd SEA Games Basketball Tournament
- Philippines 2019

Tournament details
- Games: 2019 SEA Games
- Host nation: Philippines
- Venue: SM Mall of Asia Arena (5x5); Filoil Flying V Centre (3x3)
- Duration: 1–10 December

Tournaments
← 2017	2021 →

Basketball was among the sports contested at the 2019 SEA Games in the Philippines. The basketball tournament in the games featured four events; traditional 5-on-5 basketball and 3x3 basketball, for both men and women.

In 5-on-5, the Philippines were the 12-time defending champions in men's and Malaysia were the two-time defending champions in women's. 3x3 basketball was contested for the first time for both genders.

== Competition schedule ==
3x3 basketball was held from 1 to 2 December 2019 and the regular 5-on-5 basketball event was held from 4 to 10 December 2019.

== Participating nations ==
- Cambodia
- Indonesia
- Malaysia
- Myanmar
- Philippines
- Singapore
- Thailand
- Vietnam

== Venues ==
The regular 5-on-5 basketball tournament was held at the SM Mall of Asia Arena in Pasay, while 3x3 basketball tournament was played at the Filoil Flying V Centre in San Juan.

Cuneta Astrodome was also previously considered as a potential venue for 5-on-5 basketball, while the SM Mall of Asia Activity Center was considered to host the 3x3 basketball competitions.

The Filoil Flying V Centre was initially announced to be the venue for the 5x5 basketball as well after organizers failed to secure the SM Mall of Asia Arena or a similarly larger venue due to prior event bookings.

Pasay	San Juan	Basketball at the 2019 SEA Games (Metro Manila)
SM Mall of Asia Arena	Filoil Flying V Centre	Basketball at the 2019 SEA Games (Metro Manila)
Capacity: 15,000	Capacity: 5,500	Basketball at the 2019 SEA Games (Metro Manila)

== Medalists ==
Event	Gold	Silver	Bronze
Men's 5x5 tournament	Philippines (PHI); Japeth Aguilar; June Mar Fajardo; Marcio Lassiter; Vic Manuel; Stanley Pringle; Kiefer Ravena; Troy Rosario; Chris Ross; Greg Slaughter; Christian Standhardinger; LA Tenorio; Matthew Wright	Thailand (THA); Chitchai Ananti; Darongpan Apiromvilaichai; Teerawat Chanthacon; Chatpol Chungyampin; Nakorn Jaisanuk; Chanatip Jakrawan; Patiphan Klahan; Tyler Lamb; Anucha Langsui; Attapong Leelapipatkul; Nattakarn Muangboon; Wattana Suttisin	Vietnam (VIE); Chris Dierker; Đinh Thanh Sang; Đinh Thanh Tâm; Dư Minh An; Hoàng Thế Hiển; Lê Hiếu Thành; Nguyễn Phúc Tâm; Nguyễn Huỳnh Phú Vinh; Stefan Nguyen; Trần Đăng Khoa; Võ Kim Bản; Justin Young
Women's 5x5 tournament	Philippines (PHI); Jack Animam; Afril Bernardino; France Mae Cabinbin; Ana Alicia Katrina Castillo; Clare Castro; Eunique Chan; Kelly Casey Hayes; Danica Therese Jose; Ria Joy Nabalan; Janine Pontejos; Nathalia Prado; Marrize Andrea Tongco	Thailand (THA); Tiffany Bias; Nutchavarin Buapa; Atchara Kaichaiyapoom; Supira Klunbut; Supavadee Kunchuan; Thidaporn Maihom; Kloyjai Phetsaenkha; Suree Phromrat; Wantanee Sangmanee; Pimchosita Supyen; Rattiyakorn Udomsuk; Penphan Yothanan	Indonesia (INA); Yuni Anggraeni; Clarita Antonio; Wulan Ayuningrum; Kadek Pratita Citta Dewi; Lea Elvensia Kahol; Husna Aulia Latifah; Dora Lovita; Agustin Elya Gradita Retong; Gabriel Sophia; Henny Sutjiono; Annisa Widyarni; Adelaide Callista Wongsohardjo
Men's 3×3 tournament	Philippines (PHI); Chris Newsome; CJ Perez; Jason Perkins; Moala Tautuaa	Indonesia (INA); Muhammad Sandy Ibrahim Aziz; Rivaldo Tandra Pangesthio; Oki Wira Sanjaya; Surliyadin	Vietnam (VIE); Đinh Thanh Tâm; Justin Young; Chris Dierker; Trần Đăng Khoa
Women's 3×3 tournament	Philippines (PHI); Jack Animam; Afril Bernardino; Clare Castro; Janine Pontejos	Thailand (THA); Naruemol Banmoo; Warunee Kitraksa; Kanokwan Prajuapsook; Amphawa Thuamon	Malaysia (MAS); Hui Pin Pang; Chia Qian Tai; Eugene Ting Chiau Teng; Fook Yee Yap

== Medal table ==
* Host nation (Philippines)

Rank	Nation	Gold	Silver	Bronze	Total
1	Philippines (PHI)*	4	0	0	4
2	Thailand (THA)	0	3	0	3
3	Indonesia (INA)	0	1	1	2
4	Vietnam (VIE)	0	0	2	2
5	Malaysia (MAS)	0	0	1	1
Totals (5 entries)		4	4	4	12
