= Waterskiing at the 2019 SEA Games =

- Venue: Deca Wakeboard Park
- Location: clark, angeles pampanga, Philippines
- Date: 6–8 December

The waterskiing competitions at the 2019 Southeast Asian Games in Philippines were held at Deca Wakeboard Park from 6 to 8 December 2019.

== Schedule ==
All times are local time (UTC+08:00).

Date	Time	Event
Friday, 6 December 2019	08:00	Wakeskate Women's Qualification
Friday, 6 December 2019	09:00	Wakeskate Men's Qualification
Friday, 6 December 2019	10:00	Wakeboard Women's Qualification
Friday, 6 December 2019	11:15	Wakeboard Men's Qualification
Saturday, 7 December 2019	08:00	Cable Ski Mixed Team Qualification
Saturday, 7 December 2019	12:00	Wakeboard Women's Last Chance Qualification
Saturday, 7 December 2019	13:00	Wakeboard Men's Last Chance Qualification
Sunday, 8 December 2019	08:00	Cableski Mixed Team Final
Sunday, 8 December 2019	12:00	Wakeskate Women's Final
Sunday, 8 December 2019	12:40	Wakeskate Men's Final
Sunday, 8 December 2019	13:20	Wakeboard Women's Final
Sunday, 8 December 2019	14:00	Wakeboard Men's Final

== Medal table ==
* Host nation (Philippines)

Rank	Nation	Gold	Silver	Bronze	Total
1	Thailand	2	3	0	5
2	Philippines*	2	2	2	6
3	Indonesia	1	0	1	2
4	Malaysia	0	0	1	1
4	Singapore	0	0	1	1
Totals (5 entries)		5	5	5	15

== Medalists ==
Event	Gold	Silver	Bronze
Men's wakeboard	Sanya Phonthip; Thailand	Raphael Trinidad; Philippines	Ralph Gelo Villaro; Philippines
Women's wakeboard	Patcharaporn Junnguluam; Thailand	Samantha Bermudez; Philippines	Nadya Sinaga; Indonesia
Men's wakeskate	Jhondi Wallace; Philippines	Polapat Romchatngoen; Thailand	Christian Michel Joson; Philippines
Women's wakeskate	Susan Larsson; Philippines	Thip Penpayap; Thailand	Nur Alysha Mohamad Rizwan; Singapore
Mixed team cableski	Indonesia; Safira Widodo; Nur Tsurayya Priambodo; Emilia Guliva Hampp; Muhammad Zahidi Putu Pranoto; Ade Hermana Kadir; Dimas Ridho Suprihono	Thailand; Nattawut Hapholdee; Akarin Intarakanchit; Srirasin Khamklom; Pattanan Pamonpol; Weeraya Rosendahl; Padiwat Jaemjan	Malaysia; Adam Yoong Hanifah; Nur Nadiah Md Nasir; Aaliyah Yoong Hanifah; Aiden Yoong Hanifah

== Results ==
Legend

- LCQ — Last Chance Qualification
- FRS — First Round Score
- N/A — Already Qualified

=== Men's Wakeboard ===
Athlete	Qualification			LCQ		Final			Ranking
Athlete	Run 1	Run 2	Total	Run 1	Total	Run 1	Run 2	Total	Ranking
Sanya Phonthip (PHI)	76.00	76.00	76.00	—N/a		72.67	FRS	72.67	1st place, gold medalist(s)
Raphael Trinidad (PHI)	72.00	80.67	80.67	—N/a		69.33	FRS	69.33	2nd place, silver medalist(s)
Ralph Gelo Villaro (INA)	55.00	55.00	55.00	68.00	68.00	61.00	FRS	61.00	3rd place, bronze medalist(s)
Clarence Batchelor (SGP)	56.67	61.33	61.33	—N/a		28.33	58.00	58.00	4
Alek Hanief (INA)	38.00	38.00	38.00	53.33	53.33	45.00	FRS	45.00	5
Jadon Worawong Scures (THA)	65.00	72.67	72.67	—N/a		18.67	33.67	33.67	6
Nurul Farhan Misran (SGP)	29.33	35.00	35.00	50.00	50.00	Did Not Advance			
Adam Yoong Hanifah (MAS)	Did Not Start								
Aiden Yoong Hanifah (MAS)	Did Not Start								

=== Women's Wakeboard ===
Athlete	Qualification			LCQ		Final			Ranking
Athlete	Run 1	Run 2	Total	Run 1	Total	Run 1	Run 2	Total	Ranking
Patcharaporn Junnguluam (THA)	50.00	58.33	58.33	—N/a		68.00	72.33	72.33	1st place, gold medalist(s)
Samantha Bermudez (PHI)	57.67	61.67	61.67	—N/a		62.67	FRS	62.67	2nd place, silver medalist(s)
Nadya Sinaga (INA)	31.00	31.00	31.00	45.00	45.00	41.33	45.33	45.33	3rd place, bronze medalist(s)
Gooi Jia Yi (SGP)	31.00	31.00	31.00	—N/a		38.33	43.00	43.00	4
Jasmine Nolan (THA)	57.67	61.67	61.67	—N/a		40.00	FRS	40.00	5
Susana Shayne Sacramento (PHI)	57.67	61.67	61.67	30.67	30.67	25.00	FRS	25.00	6
Nur Alysha Mohamad Rizwan (SGP)	31.00	31.00	31.00	10.00	10.00	Did Not Advance			
Aaliyah Yoong Hanifah (MAS)	Did Not Start								

=== Men's Wakeskate ===
Athlete	Qualification			Final			Ranking
Athlete	Run 1	Run 2	Total	Run 1	Run 2	Total	Ranking
Jhondi Wallace (PHI)	68.67	68.67	68.67	42.67	70.33	70.33	1st place, gold medalist(s)
Polapat Romchatngoen (THA)	50.00	50.00	50.00	40.00	67.00	67.00	2nd place, silver medalist(s)
Christian Michel Joson (PHI)	31.67	31.67	31.67	58.33	64.33	64.33	3rd place, bronze medalist(s)
Artit Supasitsaenee (THA)	22.00	30.33	30.33	62.00	62.00	62.00	4
Muhammad Fadzli Zulkifli (MAS)	25.67	27.33	27.33	45.00	45.00	45.00	5
Alek Hanief (INA)	13.33	13.33	13.33	30.00	30.00	30.00	6

=== Women's Wakeskate ===
Athlete	Qualification			Final			Ranking
Athlete	Run 1	Run 2	Total	Run 1	Run 2	Total	Ranking
Susan Larsson (PHI)	59.33	59.33	59.33	54.33	61.00	61.00	1st place, gold medalist(s)
Thip Penpayap (THA)	1.00	8.00	8.00	50.00	50.00	50.00	2nd place, silver medalist(s)
Nur Alysha Mohamad Rizman (SGP)	50.00	62.70	62.70	4.33	39.33	39.33	3rd place, bronze medalist(s)
Ma Cristina Rau (PHI)	32.00	32.00	32.00	36.33	36.33	36.33	4
Nadya Sinaga (INA)	20.00	20.00	20.00	1.00	17.00	17.00	5
Thanutkhan Soonthonwong (THA)	10.00	25.00	25.00	10.00	10.00	10.00	6
