= Esports at the 2019 SEA Games =

- Venue: Filoil Flying V Centre
- Location: San Juan, Metro Manila, Philippines
- Dates: 5–10 December

Esports at the 2019 SEA Games in the Philippines was held at the Filoil Flying V Centre in San Juan, Metro Manila from 5 to 10 December 2019. It was the first esports contest as a medal event in a multi-sport competition sanctioned by the International Olympic Committee after the discipline featured as a demonstration sport at the 2018 Asian Games in Jakarta, Indonesia.

Six medals were contested in esports while a single demonstration event was also held. The games were accredited by the Asian Electronic Sports Federation.

== Background ==
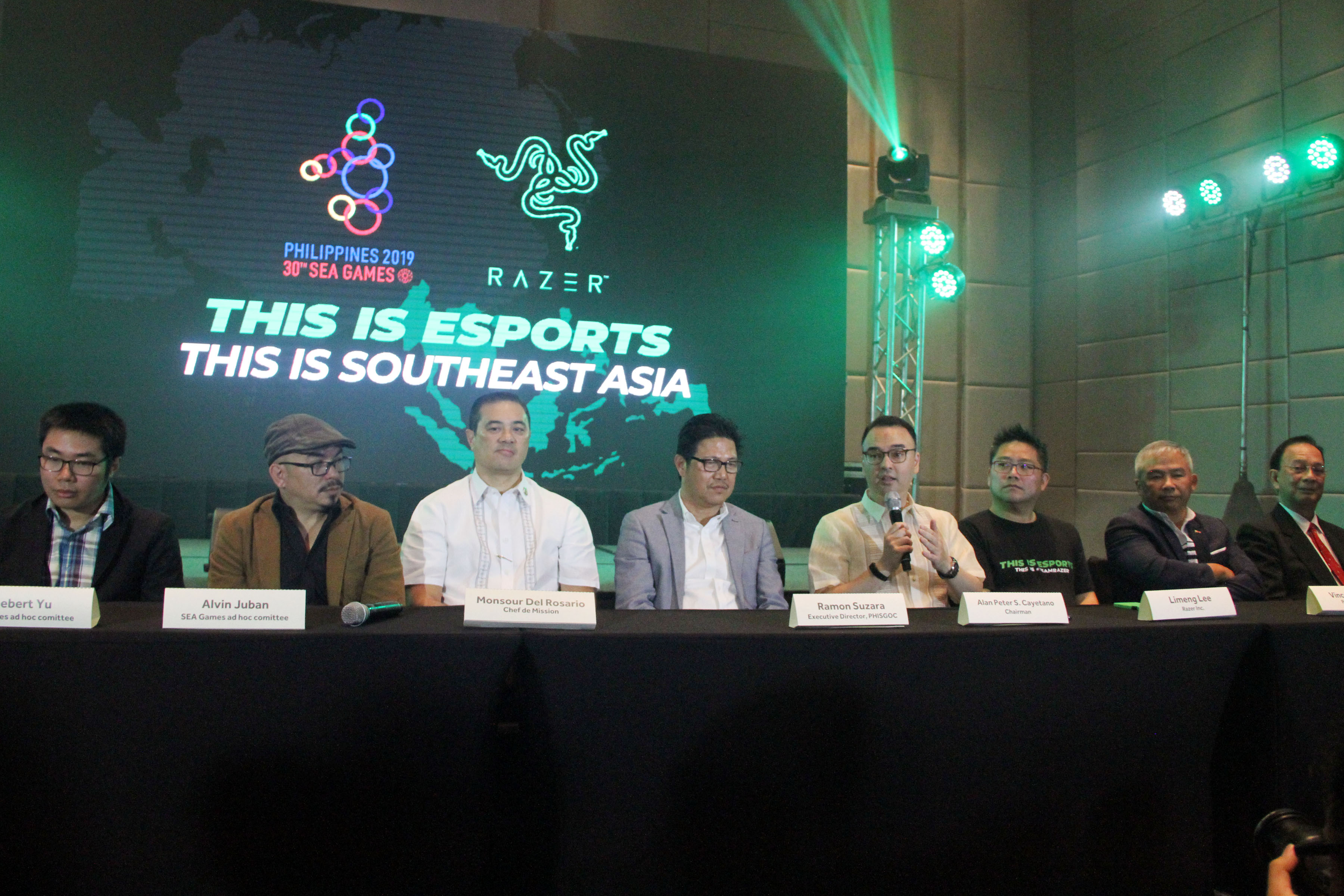
Philippines SEA Games Organizing Committee-Razer press conference held on 28 November 2018 where the inclusion of esports in the 2019 Southeast Asian Games was announced

The inclusion of esports in the Southeast Asian Games was lobbied by Min-Liang Tan, CEO of Singapore-based gaming firm Razer. Tan announced in November 2018 that he met with Philippine SEA Games Organizing Committee chair Alan Peter Cayetano to discuss about the possible inclusion of esports in the regional games, which were among the "Category 3" disciplines included in final list of proposed events to be hosted in the games.

An ad hoc committee was formed to organize the esports events in the games. Razer provided support in terms of software, hardware, and services in the organization of the esports events. Razer was designated as the Official Esports Partner. However Razer didn't provide the mobile phones for the Arena of Valor tournament since the latest update of the title required the game to be played on iOS.

By 14 December 2018, the national federation of esports has formally sought formal inclusion in the games from the International esports Federation.

The esports tournaments of the Southeast Asian Games were open to competitors of both genders with every aspiring participant to partake in a qualification tournaments. Although competitors should be at least 12 years old.

Market research firm Newzoo projects the number of audience for esports in Southeast Asia to grow to at least 31.9 million in 2019 attributing the increase to the inclusion of the discipline in the Southeast Asian Games.

=== Game selection ===
Six medals were contested in esports. The selected games were to conform to the values of the International Olympic Committee and "should not promote the culture of violence and gambling". Also other factors, such as the popularity and competitiveness of the games, the strategy and teamwork required in playing the concerned games, as well as the physical and mental intensity required in contesting the games in marathon matches, were also considered in the selection process.

There were three categories; PC, console, and mobile each featuring two video games. Mobile Legends: Bang Bang was the first title to be confirmed in November 2018 Four games: Arena of Valor, Dota 2, Starcraft II, and Tekken 7, were later announced in mid-December 2018. The organizers attempted to secure the appropriate license to be able to have NBA 2K as the sixth title but was unable to do so. Hearthstone was announced as the sixth title in June 2019.

There were also previous plans for the esports tournament to feature separate competitions for men and women where men would be competing in Dota 2, Hearthstone, NBA 2K, and Tekken 7, while women would be contesting Dota 2 and Hearthstone. The plan was later abandoned.

== Venue ==
The Filoil Flying V Centre during the games

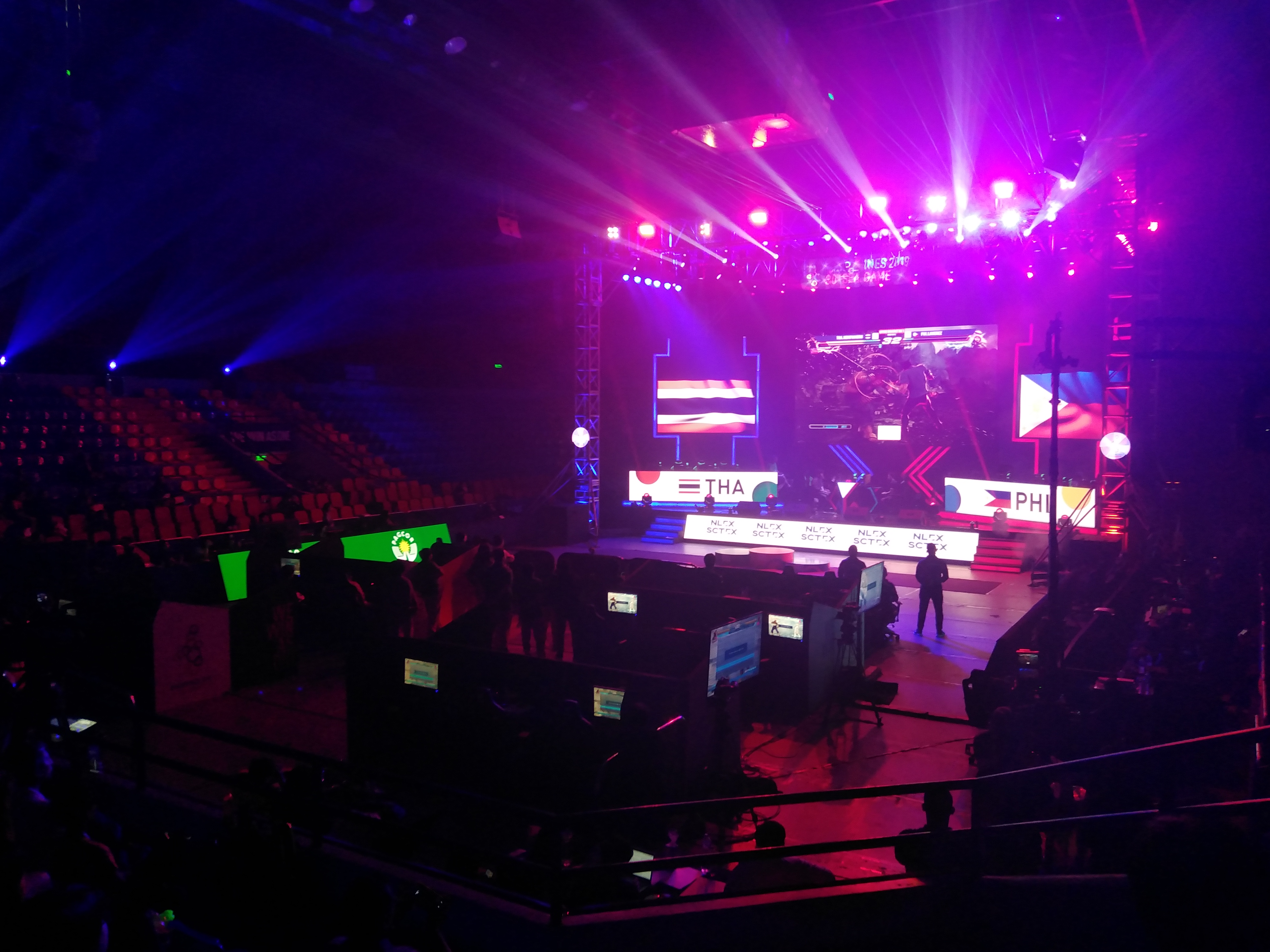
The setup of the interior of the FilOil Flying V Centre during the Tekken 7 event

The Esports competition of the 2019 Southeast Asian Games was held at the Filoil Flying V Centre (San Juan Arena) in San Juan, Metro Manila. Previously, The Manila Marriott Hotel in Pasay was considered as a potential venue but the hotel management asked for a fee which was deemed too expensive by the organizers of the regional games.

== Viewership ==
Razer reported at least a million views on its streaming platform on the first day of the esport event with about 70,000 concurrent viewers. The Filoil Flying V Centre was at full capacity at the peak of the esport tournament and Razer registered 20 million impressions with 90,000 concurrent viewers. The esports tournament's YouTube streaming was also viewed for 200,000 hours by audiences.

== Medal summary ==
=== PC ===
Event	Gold	Silver	Bronze
Dota 2	Philippines; Bryle Alvizo; James Guerra; Jun Kanehara; Van Jerico Manalaysay; Marvin Rushton; John Anthony Vargas; Mc Nicholson Villanueva	Thailand; Anucha Jirawong; Anurat Praianun; Pipat Prariyachat; Nopparit Prugsaritanon; Thanathorn Sriiamkon; Nuengnara Teeramahanon; Poomipat Trisiripanit	Vietnam; Huỳnh Hữu Nghĩa; Nguyễn Châu Lợi; Nguyễn Hoàng Lâm; Nguyễn Quang Duy; Nguyễn Tiến Phát; Nguyễn Thành Đạt; Trịnh Văn Thọ
Starcraft II	Caviar Acampado (EnDerr); Philippines	Thomas Kopankiewicz (Blysk); Singapore	Trần Hồng Phúc (MeomaikA); Vietnam
Hearthstone	Yew Weng Kean; Malaysia	Werit Popan; Thailand	Chew Khai Kiat; Singapore

=== Console ===
Event	Gold	Silver	Bronze
Tekken 7	Nopparut Hempamorn (Book); Thailand	Alexandre Laverez (AK); Philippines	Andreij Albar (Doujin); Philippines

=== Mobile ===
Event	Gold	Silver	Bronze
Arena of Valor	Thailand; Natthaphong Chaichanasap; Natpakan Chasiri; Chanon Ketkarn; Tanapol Suntimakorn; Ratthagun Suwanchai; Chitawan Tananitikan	Indonesia; Farhan Akbari Ardiansyah; Gilang Dwi Falah; Hartanto Lius; Hartawan Muliadi; Satria Adi Wiratama	Vietnam; Đỗ Thành Hưng; Huỳnh Trọng Tuấn; Nguyễn Ngọc Linh; Nguyễn Phương Nguyên; Nguyễn Vũ Hoàng Dũng; Vương Trung Khiên
Mobile Legends: Bang Bang	Philippines; Angelo Arcangel; Jeniel Bata-anon; Allan Castromayor Jr. Karl Nepomuceno; Carlito Ribo; Jason Torculas; Kenneth Villa	Indonesia; Adriand Larsen Wong; Eko Julianto; Gustian; Muhammad Ridwan; Teguh Imam Firdaus; Yurino Putra	Malaysia; Ahmad Ali Huzaifi Abdullah; Abdul Wandi Abdul Kadir; Jamil Nurolla; Izme Haqeem Hamsjid; Muhammad Hazeem Onn; Mohd Faris Zakaria

== Medal table ==
* Host nation (Philippines)

Rank	Nation	Gold	Silver	Bronze	Total
1	Philippines*	3	1	1	5
2	Thailand	2	2	0	4
3	Malaysia	1	0	1	2
4	Indonesia	0	2	0	2
5	Singapore	0	1	1	2
6	Vietnam	0	0	3	3
Totals (6 entries)		6	6	6	18
