= Obstacle racing at the 2019 SEA Games =

- Venue: Spectrum Midway Avenue, Filinvest City, Muntinlupa, Metro Manila
- Dates: 2–6 December
- Nations: 4

Obstacle racing was among the sports contested at the 2019 SEA Games. Six obstacle course racing events were featured: two events each for 100 meters with 10 obstacles, 400 meters with 12 obstacles and 5 km with 20 obstacles. These were the first obstacle course racing events in Games recognised by the International Olympic Committee and under regulation of World OCR, the Fédération Internationale de Sport d'Obstacles.

== Schedule ==
P	Preliminary	F	Final

Event↓/Date →	Mon 2	Tue 3	Wed 4	Thu 5	Fri 6
Men's 100m	P		F		
Women's 100m	P		F		
Team relay 400m	P		F		
Team assist 400m	P		F		
Men's 5 km					F
Women's 5 km					F

Source: 2019 Sea Games

== Venue ==
The venue for obstacle racing in the 2019 SEA Games was in Spectrum Midway Avenue. in Filinvest City, in Muntinlupa, Metro Manila. Obstacle racing was originally planned to be hosted in the Subic area. The Subic Bay Freeport Zone previously hosted the Spartan Race, an obstacle race sports event. The plan was later changed to host obstacle racing at the University of the Philippines Diliman's Sunken Garden however the university raised concern regarding the noise pollution and heavy traffic it would cause in its campus during the duration of the sporting event.

== Participating nations ==
Six nations expressed intention to participate in the event. Four nations medaled, Philippines (16), Malaysia (10), Indonesia (9) and Laos (2)

- Indonesia (9)
- Laos (2)
- Malaysia (10)
- Myanmar
- Philippines (16)
- Thailand

== Medal summary ==
=== Medal table ===
* Host nation (Philippines)

Rank	Nation	Gold	Silver	Bronze	Total
1	Philippines (PHI)*	6	3	1	10
2	Malaysia (MAS)	0	3	1	4
3	Indonesia (INA)	0	0	3	3
4	Laos (LAO)	0	0	1	1
Totals (4 entries)		6	6	6	18

=== Medalists ===
Event	Gold	Silver	Bronze
Men's 100 m	Kevin Jeffrey Pascua; Philippines	Mohd Redha Rozlan; Malaysia	Mark Julius Rodelas; Philippines
Men's 5 km	Mervin Guarte; Philippines	Mohammad Sherwin Managil; Philippines	Mohd Saddam Mohd Pittli; Malaysia
Women's 100 m	Rochelle Suarez; Philippines	Milky Mae Terajes; Philippines	Mudji Mulyani; Indonesia
Women's 5 km	Sandi Menchi Abahan; Philippines	Glorien Merisco; Philippines	Khamla Sorvimane; Laos
Team relay 400 m	Philippines; Nathaniel Sanchez; Jeffrey Reginio; Diana Bühler; Klymille Keilah Rodriguez	Malaysia; Mohd Redha Rozlan; Yoong Wei Theng; Salfarina Mohd Drus; Tan Jie Yi	Indonesia; Yosua Laskaman Zalukhu; Patuan Handaka Pulungan; Mudji Mulyani; Herlina Gitaningsih
Team assist 400 m	Philippines; Kyle Redentor Antolin; Kaizen Dela Serna; Monolito Divina; Deanne Nicole Moncada	Malaysia; Mohd Redha Rozlan; Yip Hui Teng; Mohd Saddam Mohd Pittli; Tan Jie Yi	Indonesia; Adnan Buchari; Mudji Mulyani; Pahrul Razi; Herlina Gitaningsih
