= Underwater hockey at the 2019 SEA Games =

Sporting event in Cavite, Philippines

- Venue: Vermosa Sports Hub
- Location: Imus, Cavite, Philippines
- Date: 2–5 December
- Nations: 4

Underwater hockey at the 2019 Southeast Asian Games was contested at the Vermosa Sports Hub in Imus, Cavite, Philippines. Two events each for men and women, namely 4-on-4 and 6-on-6 were contested at the games. The tournaments marked Malaysia's debut in an international competition outside their country.

== Participating nations ==
- Indonesia
- Malaysia
- Philippines
- Singapore

== Medal summary ==
=== Medal table ===
* Host nation (Philippines)

Rank	Nation	Gold	Silver	Bronze	Total
1	Singapore (SGP)	4	0	0	4
2	Philippines (PHI)*	0	3	1	4
3	Indonesia (INA)	0	1	3	4
Totals (3 entries)		4	4	4	12

=== Medalists ===
Event	Gold	Silver	Bronze
Men's 4x4 tournament	Singapore (SGP); Jonathan Chan; Marcus Chua; Kok Kiat Han; Kerby Kwan; Vincent Law; Simon Lee; Lim Wee Lit; Rudy Kurniawan Lin; Liu Dongliang; Lucas Ong; Twang Jia Ye; Samuel Wong	Philippines (PHI); Roy Aldous Arayata; Jonathan Bejar; Alexander Colet; Ramon Jorge; Cesar Marasigan III; Ricardo Tobias Papa; Reynaldo Paras; Jasper Parulan; Christopher Policarpo; David Quiec; Kelvin Tan; Francis Robert Yanga	Indonesia (INA); Andhika Dariano; Andreas Yufan; Anthony Lemanwono; Christopher Lemanwono; Fariz Meghadito; Ferdinand Sabandar; Guntur Putera; Hadi Hidayat; Petrol Kambey; Ronald Susantio; Steven Thenedy; Teddy Muhammad
Men's 6x6 tournament	Singapore (SGP); Jonathan Chan; Marcus Chua; Kok Kiat Han; Kerby Kwan; Vincent Law; Simon Lee; Lim Wee Lit; Rudy Kurniawan Lin; Liu Dongliang; Lucas Ong; Twang Jia Ye; Samuel Wong	Indonesia (INA); Andhika Dariano; Andreas Yufan; Anthony Lemanwono; Christopher Lemanwono; Fariz Meghadito; Ferdinand Sabandar; Guntur Putera; Hadi Hidayat; Petrol Kambey; Ronald Susantio; Steven Thenedy; Teddy Muhammad	Philippines (PHI); Roy Aldous Arayata; Jonathan Bejar; Alexander Colet; Ramon Jorge; Cesar Marasigan III; Ricardo Tobias Papa; Reynaldo Paras; Jasper Parulan; Christopher Policarpo; David Quiec; Kelvin Tan; Francis Robert Yanga
Women's 4x4 tournament	Singapore (SGP); Priscilla Ang; Cheoh Pin; Alice Chong; Chua Yi Ying; Lee Chi Kuen; Roeswita Leono Liaw; Lim Pei Ching; Celine Lim; Ena Ng; Beverley Ong; Sheena Soh; Christina Tham	Philippines (PHI); Jelyn Baldonado; Nandja Buenafe; Ivy Canlas; Jacklyn Joyce Chua; Mary Bridget Josef; JV Christabelle Lim; JV Kristine Lim; Karen Anne Naguit; Chari May Ongyanco; Maria Ines Templo; Johanna Uy; Micheline Uy	Indonesia (INA); Annisa Fabiola; Aulia Effendi; Carmelita Waluyo; Cyntia Kinasih; Geraldine Sahetapy; Josephine Suryanto; Livia Iriana; Maria Indriani; Meli; Paula Florina; Syifa Nuraini; Zefanya Hizkia
Women's 6x6 tournament	Singapore (SGP); Priscilla Ang; Cheoh Pin; Alice Chong; Chua Yi Ying; Lee Chi Kuen; Roeswita Leono Liaw; Lim Pei Ching; Celine Lim; Ena Ng; Beverley Ong; Sheena Soh; Christina Tham	Philippines (PHI); Jelyn Baldonado; Nandja Buenafe; Ivy Canlas; Jacklyn Joyce Chua; Mary Bridget Josef; JV Christabelle Lim; JV Kristine Lim; Karen Anne Naguit; Chari May Ongyanco; Maria Ines Templo; Johanna Uy; Micheline Uy	Indonesia (INA); Annisa Fabiola; Aulia Effendi; Carmelita Waluyo; Cyntia Kinasih; Geraldine Sahetapy; Josephine Suryanto; Livia Iriana; Maria Indriani; Meli; Paula Florina; Syifa Nuraini; Zefanya Hizkia

== Men's competition ==
=== 4x4 ===
Pos	Team	Pld	W	D	L	GF	GA	GD	Pts
1	Singapore	3	2	1	0	13	5	+8	7
2	Philippines (H)	3	1	2	0	12	5	+7	5
3	Indonesia	3	1	1	1	13	5	+8	4
4	Malaysia	3	0	0	3	2	25	−23	0

First match(es) will be played: 2 December 2019. Source: SEAGames PH 2019 Official Website
(H) Hosts

=== 6x6 ===
Pos	Team	Pld	W	D	L	GF	GA	GD	Pts
1	Singapore	3	3	0	0	14	3	+11	9
2	Philippines (H)	3	2	0	1	15	4	+11	6
3	Indonesia	3	1	0	2	16	6	+10	3
4	Malaysia	3	0	0	3	0	32	−32	0

First match(es) will be played: 4 December 2019. Source: SEAGames PH 2019 Official Website
(H) Hosts

== Women's competition ==
=== 4x4 ===
Pos	Team	Pld	W	D	L	GF	GA	GD	Pts
1	Singapore	3	3	0	0	21	1	+20	9
2	Philippines (H)	3	2	0	1	14	2	+12	6
3	Indonesia	3	1	0	2	8	15	−7	3
4	Malaysia	3	0	0	3	1	26	−25	0

First match(es) will be played: 2 December 2019. Source: SEAGames PH 2019 Official Website
(H) Hosts

=== 6x6 ===
Pos	Team	Pld	W	D	L	GF	GA	GD	Pts
1	Singapore	3	3	0	0	21	1	+20	9
2	Philippines (H)	3	2	0	1	15	3	+12	6
3	Indonesia	3	1	0	2	11	9	+2	3
4	Malaysia	3	0	0	3	0	34	−34	0

First match(es) will be played: 4 December 2019. Source: SEAGames PH 2019 Official Website
(H) Hosts
