= Sailing at the 2019 SEA Games =

- Venue: Subic Bay Yacht Club
- Location: Subic Bay, Philippines
- Dates: 2–9 December
- Competitors: 27 from 5 nations

Sailing at the 2019 SEA Games was held at Subic Bay Yacht Club from 2 to 9 December 2019.

== Participating nations ==
- Philippines
- Thailand
- Singapore
- Malaysia
- Myanmar

== Medal table ==
* Host nation (Philippines)

Rank	Nation	Gold	Silver	Bronze	Total
1	Thailand (THA)	5	2	2	9
2	Philippines (PHI)*	3	1	1	5
3	Singapore (SGP)	1	5	0	6
4	Malaysia (MAS)	0	1	5	6
5	Myanmar (MYA)	0	0	1	1
Totals (5 entries)		9	9	9	27

== Medalist ==
=== Men ===
Event	Gold	Silver	Bronze
Optimist	Panwa Boonnak; Thailand	Kenan Tan; Singapore	Putera Adrine Danish Puad; Malaysia
Laser standard	Ryan Lo; Singapore	Keerati Bualong; Thailand	Khairulnizam Afendy; Malaysia
International 420	Thailand; Jedtavee Yongyuennarn; Chakkaphat Wiriyakitti	Malaysia; Muhammad Fauzi Kaman Shah; Umar Al Farouk Zahawi	Philippines; Brandhon Aquino; Jericko Marbella
International 470	Philippines; Lester Tayong; Emerson Villena	Thailand; Navee Thamsoontorn; Nut Butmarasri	Malaysia; Mohamad Faizal Norizan; Ahmad Syukri Abdul Aziz

=== Women ===
Event	Gold	Silver	Bronze
Optimist	Noppassorn Khunboonjan; Thailand	Radiance Koh; Singapore	May Myat Noe Khin; Myanmar
Laser radial	Kamolwan Chanyim; Thailand	Victoria Chan; Singapore	Nur Shazrin Mohd Latif; Malaysia
International 420	Thailand; Chanokchon Wangsuk; Piyaporn Khemkaew	Philippines; Gie Lyn Boyano; Coleen Jem Ferrer	Malaysia; Nor Nabila Natasha Mohd Nazri; Poquita Yong

=== Mixed ===
Event	Gold	Silver	Bronze
Keelboat fleet racing in FE28R	Philippines; Ridgely Balladares; Rubin Cruz Jr. Whok Dimapilis; Richly Magsanay; Joel Mejarito; Edgar Villapaña	Singapore; Stanley Chan; Anthony Kiong; Colin Ng; Daniella Ng; Roy Tay; Xu Yuanzhen	Thailand; Hanphol Chavasilp; Atiwat Chomtongdee; Totsapon Mahawichean; Anusorn Ngamrit; Natthawut Paenyaem; Nutpatsorn Wachirapongsin
Keelboat match racing in FE28R	Philippines; Ridgely Balladares; Rubin Cruz Jr. Whok Dimapilis; Richly Magsanay; Joel Mejarito; Edgar Villapaña	Singapore; Stanley Chan; Anthony Kiong; Colin Ng; Daniella Ng; Roy Tay; Xu Yuanzhen	Thailand; Hanphol Chavasilp; Atiwat Chomtongdee; Totsapon Mahawichean; Anusorn Ngamrit; Natthawut Paenyaem; Nutpatsorn Wachirapongsin
