= Table tennis at the 2019 SEA Games – Men's singles =

Table tennis – Men's singles at the 2019 SEA Games
- Venue: Subic Bay Exhibition & Convention Center
- Dates: 8–10 December 2019
- Competitors: 14 from 7 nations

Medalists
gold medal	Pang Yew En Koen (SGP)
silver medal	Clarence Chew (SGP)
bronze medal	Richard Gonzales (PHI)
bronze medal	Padasak Tanviriyavechakul (THA)

The men's singles competition of the table tennis events at the 2019 SEA Games was held from 8 to 10 December at the Subic Bay Exhibition & Convention Center in Subic Bay Freeport Zone, Zambales, Philippines.

== Schedule ==
All times are Philippines Time (UTC+08:00).

Date	Time	Round
8 December 2019	10:00	Preliminaries
9 December 2019	14:00	Preliminaries
10 December 2019	11:20	Semifinals
10 December 2019	14:45	Finals

== Results ==
=== Preliminary round ===
Source: Results (Groups) - Men's Singles

==== Group 1 ====
Player	Pld	W	L	GF	GA	PF	PA	Points
Clarence Chew (SGP)	2	2	0	8	3	122	96	4
Jann Mari Nayre (PHI)	2	1	1	7	4	123	116	3
Wong Qi Shen (MAS)	2	0	2	1	8	68	101	2

8 Dec 10:00
Name	1	2	3	4	5	6	7	Match
Jann Mari Nayre (PHI)	11	11	11	11	11			4
Wong Qi Shen (MAS)	8	6	6	13	7			1
Report

8 Dec 15:20
Name	1	2	3	4	5	6	7	Match
Clarence Chew (SGP)	11	13	11	11				4
Wong Qi Shen (MAS)	2	11	9	6				0
Report

9 Dec 14:00
Name	1	2	3	4	5	6	7	Match
Clarence Chew (SGP)	13	11	10	12	11	8	11	4
Jann Mari Nayre (PHI)	15	8	12	10	7	11	5	3
Report

==== Group 2 ====
Player	Pld	W	L	GF	GA	PF	PA	Points
Padasak Tanviriyavechakul (THA)	2	2	0	8	2	109	77	4
Doan Ba Tuan Anh (VIE)	2	1	1	4	4	76	71	3
Muhamad Rizal Muhamad Ashraf Haiqal (MAS)	2	0	2	2	8	69	150	2

8 Dec 10:00
Name	1	2	3	4	5	6	7	Match
Muhamad Rizal Muhamad Ashraf Haiqal (MAS)	5	4	9	6				0
Doan Ba Tuan Anh (VIE)	11	11	11	11				4
Report

8 Dec 15:20
Name	1	2	3	4	5	6	7	Match
Padasak Tanviriyavechakul (THA)	11	11	11	14				4
Doan Ba Tuan Anh (VIE)	7	4	9	12				0
Report

9 Dec 14:00
Name	1	2	3	4	5	6	7	Match
Padasak Tanviriyavechakul (THA)	11	11	11	11	7	11		4
Muhamad Rizal Muhamad Ashraf Haiqal (MAS)	6	2	7	13	11	6		2
Report

==== Group 3 ====
Player	Pld	W	L	GF	GA	PF	PA	Points
Richard Gonzales (PHI)	3	3	0	12	4	168	127	6
Nguyen Anh Tu (VIE)	3	2	1	10	5	154	117	5
Oo Soe Min (MYA)	3	1	2	6	8	117	123	4
Lay Phakdey (CAM)	3	0	3	1	12	68	141	3

8 Dec 10:40
Name	1	2	3	4	5	6	7	Match
Richard Gonzales (PHI)	11	11	11	6	11			4
Oo Soe Min (MYA)	7	3	9	11	9			1
Report

8 Dec 10:40
Name	1	2	3	4	5	6	7	Match
Nguyen Anh Tu (VIE)	11	11	11	11				4
Lay Phakdey (CAM)	1	4	7	6				0
Report

8 Dec 16:00
Name	1	2	3	4	5	6	7	Match
Richard Gonzales (PHI)	11	11	9	11	11			4
Lay Phakdey (CAM)	4	4	11	8	4			1
Report

8 Dec 16:00
Name	1	2	3	4	5	6	7	Match
Nguyen Anh Tu (VIE)	9	11	11	11	11			4
Oo Soe Min (MYA)	11	3	5	8	7			1
Report

9 Dec 14:40
Name	1	2	3	4	5	6	7	Match
Richard Gonzales (PHI)	11	11	11	11	8	13		4
Nguyen Anh Tu (VIE)	7	8	7	13	11	11		2
Report

9 Dec 14:40
Name	1	2	3	4	5	6	7	Match
Lay Phakdey (CAM)	6	7	2	5				0
Oo Soe Min (MYA)	11	11	11	11				4
Report

==== Group 4 ====
Player	Pld	W	L	GF	GA	PF	PA	Points
Pang Yew En Koen (SGP)	3	3	0	12	1	141	77	6
Wisutmaythangkoon Supanat (THA)	3	2	1	9	6	143	118	5
Latt Thet Ko Ko (MYA)	3	1	2	6	9	107	129	4
Soeung Tola (CAM)	3	0	3	1	12	71	138	3

8 Dec 11:20
Name	1	2	3	4	5	6	7	Match
Pang Yew En Koen (SGP)	11	11	11	11				4
Soeung Tola (CAM)	3	6	3	5				0
Report

8 Dec 11:20
Name	1	2	3	4	5	6	7	Match
Wisutmaythangkoon Supanat (THA)	11	11	4	11	8	11		4
Latt Thet Ko Ko (MYA)	3	2	11	9	11	4		2
Report

8 Dec 16:40
Name	1	2	3	4	5	6	7	Match
Pang Yew En Koen (SGP)	12	11	11	11				4
Latt Thet Ko Ko (MYA)	10	1	1	6				0
Report

8 Dec 16:40
Name	1	2	3	4	5	6	7	Match
Wisutmaythangkoon Supanat (THA)	11	11	11	12				4
Soeung Tola (CAM)	3	6	7	10				0
Report

9 Dec 15:20
Name	1	2	3	4	5	6	7	Match
Wisutmaythangkoon Supanat (THA)	8	7	11	7	9			1
Pang Yew En Koen (SGP)	11	11	8	11	11			4
Report

9 Dec 15:20
Name	1	2	3	4	5	6	7	Match
Soeung Tola (CAM)	1	5	11	7	4			1
Latt Thet Ko Ko (MYA)	11	11	5	11	11			4
Report

=== Knockout round ===
Semifinals; 10 December 11:20
Clarence Chew (SGP)	4
Richard Gonzales (PHI)	1
Padasak Tanviriyavechakul (THA)	3
Pang Yew En Koen (SGP)	4

Gold-medal match 10 December 14:45
Clarence Chew (SGP)	0
Pang Yew En Koen (SGP)	4

==== Semifinals ====
10 Dec 11:20
Name	1	2	3	4	5	6	7	Match
Clarence Chew (SGP)	11	11	5	11	11			4
Richard Gonzales (PHI)	3	8	11	4	9			1
Report

10 Dec 12:00
Name	1	2	3	4	5	6	7	Match
Pang Yew En Koen (SGP)	7	10	7	11	11	11	11	4
Padasak Tanviriyavechakul (THA)	11	12	11	9	6	3	9	3
Report

==== Gold-medal match ====
10 Dec 14:45
Name	1	2	3	4	5	6	7	Match
Clarence Chew (SGP)	5	7	7	10				0
Pang Yew En Koen (SGP)	11	11	11	12				4
Report
