= Subic Bay Exhibition and Convention Center =

- Interactive map of Subic Bay Exhibition and Convention Center
- Location: Subic Bay Industrial Park, Olongapo, Zambales, Philippines
- Coordinates: 14°49′46.9″N 120°17′55.3″E
- Owner: Subic Bay Metropolitan Authority
- Type: Convention center

Construction
- Built: 1996 (as a factory)
- Opened: October 28, 2007 (as a convention center)
- Renovated: 2007, 2019

The Subic Bay Exhibition and Convention Center (SBECC) is a convention center at the Olongapo, Zambales portion of the Subic Freeport Zone in the Philippines.

== History ==
The Subic Bay Metropolitan Authority (SBMA) converted the pre-existing GVC Building at the Subic Bay Industrial Park into a convention center for ₱50 million. The building which dates back to December 1996 formerly functioned as a computer parts factory.

The refurbished venue was inaugurated on September 28, 2007. The 20th Philippine Advertising Congress in November 2007 is the facility's first event after the conversion.

The biannual Ad Summit Pilipinas of the Association of Accredited Advertising Agencies of the Philippines was held at the venue in 2014, 2016, and 2018.

It was renovated in 2019 for the 30th SEA Games with the convention center used for the Muay Thai, pencak silat and table tennis competitions.

== Facilities ==
The Subic Bay Exhibition and Convention Center covers an area of 10,470 square meters (112,700 sq ft) It has function halls, convention halls and other spaces.
