= Muay Thai at the 2019 SEA Games =

- Venue: Subic Bay Exhibition and Convention Center
- Location: Subic Bay Freeport Zone, Zambales, Philippines
- Dates: 3–8 December
- Competitors: 45 from 7 nations

The Muay Thai competition at the 2019 SEA Games in the Philippines was held at the Subic Bay Exhibition and Convention Center in Subic Bay Freeport Zone, Zambales, Philippines from 3 to 8 December 2019.

== Participating nations ==
A total of 45 athletes from 7 nations participated (the numbers of athletes are shown in parentheses).

- Cambodia (5)
- Laos (5)
- Malaysia (7)
- Philippines (10)
- Singapore (2)
- Thailand (7)
- Vietnam (9)

== Medal summary ==
=== Medal table ===
* Host nation (Philippines)

Rank	Nation	Gold	Silver	Bronze	Total
1	Thailand	4	1	0	5
2	Philippines*	3	4	2	9
3	Malaysia	1	2	2	5
4	Vietnam	1	1	3	5
5	Laos	0	1	2	3
6	Indonesia	0	0	5	5
7	Cambodia	0	0	3	3
8	Singapore	0	0	1	1
Totals (8 entries)		9	9	18	36

=== Waikru events ===
Event	Gold	Silver	Bronze
Men	Philippines; Jearome Calica; Joemar Gallaza	Malaysia; Hatem Ramijam; Mohamad Ismail	Indonesia; Lorens Walun; Muhammad Uchida Sudirman
Men	Philippines; Jearome Calica; Joemar Gallaza	Malaysia; Hatem Ramijam; Mohamad Ismail	Vietnam; Nguyễn Tăng Quyền; Nguyễn Trần Duy Nhất
Women	Thailand; Thanawan Thongduang; Ruchira Wongsriwo	Philippines; Rusha Mae Bayacsan; Irendin Lepatan	Indonesia; Novita Anggi Ayuni; Angelina Runtukahu
Women	Thailand; Thanawan Thongduang; Ruchira Wongsriwo	Philippines; Rusha Mae Bayacsan; Irendin Lepatan	Vietnam; Huỳnh Hà Hữu Hiếu; Trần Thị Lụa

=== Men's events ===
Event	Gold	Silver	Bronze
45 kg	Mohammad Masdor; Malaysia	Soulixay Singsavath; Laos	Kim Robert Miranda; Philippines
45 kg	Mohammad Masdor; Malaysia	Soulixay Singsavath; Laos	Lê Hoàng Đức; Vietnam
48 kg	Naruephon Chittra; Thailand	Zulhilmi Rosli; Malaysia	As Alexis Mayag; Philippines
48 kg	Naruephon Chittra; Thailand	Zulhilmi Rosli; Malaysia	Him Koemrieng; Cambodia
54 kg	Ariel Lee Lampacan; Philippines	Sakchai Chamchit; Thailand	Vann Voeurn; Cambodia
54 kg	Ariel Lee Lampacan; Philippines	Sakchai Chamchit; Thailand	Riedzwan Daud; Malaysia
57 kg	Phillip Delarmino; Philippines	Nguyễn Doãn Long; Vietnam	Muhammad Vicky Muchlis; Indonesia
57 kg	Phillip Delarmino; Philippines	Nguyễn Doãn Long; Vietnam	Kay Ketnouvong; Laos
63.5 kg	Norapat Khundam; Thailand	Ryan Jakiri; Philippines	Irvan Aji Maulana Putra; Indonesia
63.5 kg	Norapat Khundam; Thailand	Ryan Jakiri; Philippines	Lao Chetra; Cambodia

=== Women's events ===
Event	Gold	Silver	Bronze
45 kg	Ketmanee Chasing; Thailand	Islay Erika Bomogao; Philippines	Irsalina; Indonesia
45 kg	Ketmanee Chasing; Thailand	Islay Erika Bomogao; Philippines	Phouthasone Keosayavong; Laos
54 kg	Bùi Yến Ly; Vietnam	Jenelyn Olsim; Philippines	Nur Amisha Azrilrizal; Malaysia
54 kg	Bùi Yến Ly; Vietnam	Jenelyn Olsim; Philippines	Lena Tan; Singapore
