= Pencak silat at the 2019 SEA Games =

- Venue: Subic Bay Exhibition and Convention Center
- Location: Subic Bay, Philippines
- Date: 2–5 December

Pencak silat competitions at the 2019 SEA Games in Philippines were held at the Subic Bay Exhibition and Convention Center from 2 to 5 December 2019.

== Schedule ==
The following is the schedule for the pencak silat competitions. All times are Philippine Standard Time (UTC+8).

Date	Time	Event	Phase
Mon, 2 December 2019	10:00	Seni – Men's singles	Final
Mon, 2 December 2019	10:00	Seni – Men's team	Final
Mon, 2 December 2019	15:00	Seni – Men's doubles	Final
Tue, 3 December 2019	10:15	Seni – Women's singles	Final
Tue, 3 December 2019	11:00	Tanding	Elimination round
Wed, 4 December 2019	10:00	Tanding	Semifinals
Thu, 5 December 2019	10:00	Tanding	Finals

== Medal table ==
* Host nation (Philippines)

Rank	Nation	Gold	Silver	Bronze	Total
1	Indonesia	2	3	2	7
2	Singapore	2	1	2	5
3	Malaysia	2	0	2	4
4	Philippines*	1	2	1	4
4	Thailand	1	2	1	4
6	Vietnam	1	1	2	4
7	Laos	0	0	3	3
8	Brunei	0	0	1	1
Totals (8 entries)		9	9	14	32

== Medalists ==
=== Seni (artistic) ===
Event	Gold	Silver	Bronze
Men's singles	Edmar Tacuel; Philippines	Muhammad Iqbal Abdul Rahman; Singapore	Dino Sulistianto; Indonesia
Men's doubles	Malaysia; Mohd Taqiyuddin Hamid; Sazzlan bin Yuga	Philippines; Alfau Jan Abad; Almohaidib Abad	Laos; Amphonh Khounchaleun; Alisack Singsouvong
Men's team	Singapore; Hamillatu Arash Juffrie; Nujaid Hasif Zainal Abidin; Muhammad Nazrul Mohd Kamal	Thailand; Masofee Wani; Fadil Dama; Islamee Wani	Malaysia; Muhammad Syafiq Ibrahim; Mohd Juned Abdullah; Nasrul Edzam Mohd Asri
Women's singles	Puspa Arumsari; Indonesia	Mary Francine Padios; Philippines	Anisah Najihah Abdullah; Brunei

=== Tanding (match) ===
==== Men ====
Event	Gold	Silver	Bronze
Class A 45–50 kg	Nitinai Thamkaeo; Thailand	Khoirudin Mustakim; Indonesia	Thanaphonh Simphilavong; Laos
Class A 45–50 kg	Nitinai Thamkaeo; Thailand	Khoirudin Mustakim; Indonesia	Mohammad Khairi Adie Azhar; Malaysia
Class B 50–55 kg	Muhammad Hazim Yusli; Singapore	Nguyễn Đình Tuấn; Vietnam	Hidayat Limonu; Indonesia
Class B 50–55 kg	Muhammad Hazim Yusli; Singapore	Nguyễn Đình Tuấn; Vietnam	Dines Dumaan; Philippines
Class D 60–65 kg	Zulfazly Zulfakar; Malaysia	Hanifan Yudani Kusumah; Indonesia	Adilan Chemaeng; Thailand
Class D 60–65 kg	Zulfazly Zulfakar; Malaysia	Hanifan Yudani Kusumah; Indonesia	Nguyễn Ngọc Toàn; Vietnam

==== Women ====
Event	Gold	Silver	Bronze
Class A 45–50 kg	Suci Wulandari; Indonesia	Firdao Duromae; Thailand	Atiq Syazwani Roslan; Singapore
Class A 45–50 kg	Suci Wulandari; Indonesia	Firdao Duromae; Thailand	Phạm Thị Tươi; Vietnam
Class B 50–55 kg	Trần Thị Thêm; Vietnam	Jeni Kause; Indonesia	Olathai Sounthavong; Laos
Class B 50–55 kg	Trần Thị Thêm; Vietnam	Jeni Kause; Indonesia	Nurul Suhaila; Singapore
