= Table tennis at the 2019 SEA Games =

- Venue: Subic Bay Exhibition and Convention Center
- Location: Subic Bay Freeport Zone, Zambales, Philippines
- Dates: 6–10 December
- Competitors: 49 from 7 nations

Table tennis at the 2019 SEA Games was held at the Subic Bay Exhibition and Convention Center, Subic Bay Freeport Zone, Zambales, Philippines from 6 to 10 December 2019.

== Participating nations ==
A total of 49 athletes from nine nations competed in table tennis at the 2019 Southeast Asian Games:

- Cambodia (4)
- Malaysia (8)
- Myanmar (5)
- Philippines (8)
- Singapore (8)
- Thailand (8)
- Vietnam (8)

== Competition schedule ==
The following is the competition schedule for the table tennis competitions:

P	Preliminaries	R16	Round of 16	¼	Quarterfinals	½	Semifinals	F	Final

Event↓/Date →	Fri 6		Sat 7		Sun 8	Mon 9	Tue 10	
Men's singles					P	P	½	F
Men's doubles	R16	¼	½	F				
Women's singles					P	P	½	F
Women's doubles	R16	¼	½	F				

== Medalists ==
Event	Gold	Silver	Bronze
Men's singles	Pang Yew En Koen; Singapore	Clarence Chew; Singapore	Padasak Tanviriyavechakul; Thailand
Men's singles	Pang Yew En Koen; Singapore	Clarence Chew; Singapore	Richard Pugoy Gonzales; Philippines
Women's singles	Lin Ye; Singapore	Feng Tianwei; Singapore	Nanthana Komwong; Thailand
Women's singles	Lin Ye; Singapore	Feng Tianwei; Singapore	Suthasini Sawettabut; Thailand
Men's doubles	Vietnam; Đoàn Bá Tuấn Anh; Nguyễn Anh Tú	Singapore; Josh Chua; Pang Yew En Koen	Malaysia; Javen Choong; Amos Ling Yi Heng
Men's doubles	Vietnam; Đoàn Bá Tuấn Anh; Nguyễn Anh Tú	Singapore; Josh Chua; Pang Yew En Koen	Malaysia; Muhammad Ashraf Haiqal; Wong Shen
Women's doubles	Thailand; Orawan Paranang; Suthasini Sawettabut	Thailand; Nanthana Komwong; Jinnipa Sawettabut	Singapore; Feng Tianwei; Lin Ye
Women's doubles	Thailand; Orawan Paranang; Suthasini Sawettabut	Thailand; Nanthana Komwong; Jinnipa Sawettabut	Singapore; Goi Rui Xuan; Wong Xin Ru

== Medal summary ==
* Host nation (Philippines)

Rank	Nation	Gold	Silver	Bronze	Total
1	Singapore (SGP)	2	3	2	7
2	Thailand (THA)	1	1	3	5
3	Vietnam (VIE)	1	0	0	1
4	Malaysia (MAS)	0	0	2	2
5	Philippines (PHI)*	0	0	1	1
Totals (5 entries)		4	4	8	16

== See also ==
- Table tennis at the 2020 ASEAN Para Games
