= Soft tennis at the 2019 SEA Games =

- Venue: Rizal Memorial Tennis Center
- Location: Manila, Metro Manila
- Dates: 7–10 December

Soft tennis at the 2019 SEA Games was held at the Rizal Memorial Tennis Center, Manila, Philippines. It was held from 7 to 10 December 2019.

== Medal summaries ==
=== Medal table ===
* Host nation (Philippines)

| Rank | Nation | Gold | Silver | Bronze | Total |
|---|---|---|---|---|---|
| 1 | Philippines (PHI)* | 3 | 0 | 1 | 4 |
| 2 | Thailand (THA) | 0 | 2 | 1 | 3 |
| 3 | Indonesia (INA) | 0 | 1 | 1 | 2 |
| 4 | Cambodia (CAM) | 0 | 0 | 2 | 2 |
| 5 | Laos (LAO) | 0 | 0 | 1 | 1 |
| Totals (5 entries) | | 3 | 3 | 6 | 12 |

=== Medalists ===
| Event | Gold | Silver | Bronze |
|---|---|---|---|
| Women's singles | Noelle Mañalac; Philippines | Anadeleyda Kawengian; Indonesia | Meth Mariyan; Cambodia |
| Women's singles | Noelle Mañalac; Philippines | Anadeleyda Kawengian; Indonesia | Dares Srirungreang; Thailand |
| Women's doubles | Philippines; Noelle Zoleta; Noelle Mañalac | Thailand; Sawitre Naree; Natchatjira Kerdsomboon | Laos; Aliya Maniphone; Champamanivong Phonesamai |
| Women's doubles | Philippines; Noelle Zoleta; Noelle Mañalac | Thailand; Sawitre Naree; Natchatjira Kerdsomboon | Philippines; Erdilyn Peralta; Princess Catindig |
| Men's team | Philippines; Mark Alcoseba; Joseph Arcilla; Noel Damian Jr. Kevin Mamawal; Mikoff Manduriao; Dheo Talatayod | Thailand; Chaiwit Leampriboon; Torlarp Songweera; Teerapat Sujaritplee; Thanarit Surarak; Sakan Thansiriroj; Kawin Yannarit | Cambodia; Dim Som Sombat; Kann Sophorn; John Mada; Orn Sambath; Pel Vanny; Yi Keavirak |
| Men's team | Philippines; Mark Alcoseba; Joseph Arcilla; Noel Damian Jr. Kevin Mamawal; Mikoff Manduriao; Dheo Talatayod | Thailand; Chaiwit Leampriboon; Torlarp Songweera; Teerapat Sujaritplee; Thanarit Surarak; Sakan Thansiriroj; Kawin Yannarit | Indonesia; Alexander Elbert Sie; Fernando Sanger; Mario Alibasa; Muhammad Anugerah; Ragil Wahyudiono; Sunu Wahyu Trijati |
