= John Chicano =

Filipino triathlete (born 1991)

Personal information
- Full name: John Leerams Chicano
- Nickname: Rambo
- Born: October 6, 1991 (age 34) Subic, Philippines

Sport
- Country: Philippines
- Coached by: Melvyn Fausto
Medal record
Event	1st	2nd	3rd
Southeast Asian Games	2	1	0
Total	2	1	0
Representing Philippines
Men's triathlon
Southeast Asian Games
Gold medal – first place	2019 Philippines	Individual
Gold medal – first place	2019 Philippines	Mixed Relay
Silver medal – second place	2017 Putrajaya	Individual

John Leerams Chicano (born October 6, 1991), popularly known as Rambo in the triathlon community, is a professional Filipino triathlete. He won a gold medal at the 2019 Southeast Asian Games men's triathlon at Subic Bay Boardwalk in Zambales.

== Career ==
Prior to becoming a triathlete, Chicano was a cyclist competing in junior competitions. In 2007, he had to work in a bicycle shop so he could earn a living to support his child. The owner of the shop was Coach Melvin Fausto, a coach for the Triathlon Association of the Philippines (TRAP). Fausto saw potential in Chicano and trained him to become a bicycle mechanic and later taught him on how to become a triathlete. Prior to training under Fausto, Chicano had no experience in how to swim and had to be taught in swimming for three months. Within a year, Chicano became competitive enough to be able to participate and win races at the Subic International Triathlon. He became a member of the national team in 2009.

Chicano competed at the Southeast Asian Games. He represented the Philippines in the 2017 edition in Kuala Lumpur along with Nikko Huelgas in triathlon. He settled for silver after he helped his compatriot, Huelgas in the cycling leg of the men's triathlon event who eventually won the gold medal. Chicano himself won gold in the 2019 edition hosted at home in the Philippines with the men's triathlon event held in Subic.

== Personal life ==
Chicano was born on October 6, 1991, in Olongapo City, Zambales. He is a father of two children.

== See also ==
- Philippines at the 2019 Southeast Asian Games
