= AK (gamer) =

Filipino esports player

Personal information
- Born: Alexandre Gabriel Laverez; 2000 or 2001 (age 25–26)
- Nationality: Filipino

Career information
- Games: Tekken

Team history
- —: Playbook
- 2024–2025: Natus Vincere

Career highlights and awards
- Combo Breaker champion (2024); SEA Games silver medal (2019)
Medal record
Esports
Representing Philippines
Southeast Asian Games
Silver medal – second place	2019 Philippines	Tekken 7

Alexandre Gabriel Laverez, known professionally as AK, is a Filipino Tekken player.

== Early life and education ==
Alexandre Gabriel Laverez was born in 2000 or 2001 to a businessman father and a corporate manager mother. His uncle introduced him to the Tekken franchise and taught him the basics of the game, including how to execute combos.

Laverez said he started playing at four years old. He played Tekken Tag Tournament in arcade cabinets in shopping malls and according to his own account he was already beating older players. He later acquired a PlayStation to continue honing his skills in the game.

He graduated from the De La Salle–College of Saint Benilde with a degree in business management in 2024. He began attending the De La Salle University College of Law by 2026.

== Career ==
=== Gaming ===
Alexandre Laverez, later known by his handle AK, has been competing in domestic and international Tekken competitions since he was 13 years old. He started joining competitions with Tekken 6. Marshall Law and Paul Phoenix were his main characters. He won his first tournament in 2012, the Pinoy Gaming Festival.

At the 2013 Global Championship in Seoul for Tekken Tag Tournament 2, AK finished third behind Korean players Saint and JDCR. This earned him a berth at the 2015 The King of Iron Fist Tournament (KoIFT), the first global tournament for Tekken 7. Shaheen, a new character introduced in Tekken 7, became AK's main.

At Evo Japan 2019, AK was first runner-up losing to Pakistani gamer Arslan Ash in the grand finals.

At the 2019 SEA Games hosted at home in the Philippines, AK as part of the Sibol national team finished as silver medalist in the Tekken 7 tournament losing to Nopparut "Book" Hempamorn of Thailand in the final.

AK played at The Nationals representing Laus Playbook where he won four titles in Tekken 7.

He won another silver medal as part of the national team at the 2023 IESF World Esports Championship held in Romania.

In May 2024, AK won the Combo Breaker in Schaumburg, Illinois, his first international title in Tekken 8. AK defeated Arslan Ash in the grand finals.

AK joined Natus Vincere (NAVI) in June 2024. He stayed until NAVI disbanded its Tekken team in August 2025.

=== Events organization ===
By 2026, AK is managing Playbook Events, along with Pocholo Estrada and Kevin Mando. The organization bears the same name but is unrelated to AK's previous esports organization.
