= Roger Casugay =

Filipino professional surfer

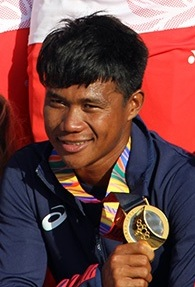

Personal information
- Born: March 10, 1994 (age 32)
- Height: 158 cm (5 ft 2 in)
- Weight: 58 kg (128 lb)

Surfing career
- Sport: Surfing
Medal record
Representing Philippines
Men's surfing
Southeast Asian Games
Gold medal – first place	2019 Philippines	Longboard

Roger Casugay (born March 10, 1994), is a Filipino surfer who competed for the Philippines at the 2019 Southeast Asian Games. He is the first Filipino to receive the Pierre de Coubertin Act of Fair Play Award of the International Fair Play Committee in recognition of saving a competitor in longboard semifinals of the 2019 Southeast Asian Games.

== Career ==
A native of San Fernando, La Union, Casugay represented the Philippines in the surfing longboard event at the 2019 Southeast Asian Games which his country hosted. Typhoon Kammuri (Tisoy) has affected the wave conditions at the surfing venue of the games.

His act during the longboard semifinals on December 6, 2019, was widely acclaimed when he saved Arip Nurhidayat, an Indonesian competitor from drowning risking a chance to win the longboard gold medal. Casugay was regarded as a "hero" on social media due to his deed, eventually won a rematch against Nurhidayat and bested fellow Filipino surfer Rogelio Esquivel for the gold medal.

Due to his deed, he was named as the flag bearer of the Philippine delegation at the closing ceremony and was conferred the Order of Lapu-Lapu. He was also commended by the Senate through a resolution.

Prior to his stint at the 2019 Southeast Asian Games, he competed at the 2018 Philippine Surfing Championship Tour where he finished 3rd.

In 2020, Casugay was recognized for his act in the 2019 Southeast Asian Games by the International Fair Play Committee and was awarded the Pierre de Coubertin Act of Fair Play Award. He is the first Filipino to receive the award.

== Personal life ==
Lisa Verweij, a Dutch, is Casugay's girlfriend. As of December 2019, they have been in a relationship for about three years.

== See also ==
- Surfing at the 2019 Southeast Asian Games
