= EnDerr =

Personal information
- Born: Caviar Napoleon Marquises-Acampado; December 2, 1992 (age 33)
- Nationality: Filipino

Career information
- Game: StarCraft II

Team history
- –: Mineski
- –: Imperium
- ?–2021: Liyab Esports
Medal record
Esports
Representing Philippines
Southeast Asian Games
Gold medal – first place	2019 Philippines	Starcraft II

Caviar Napoleon Marquises-Acampado, known professionally as EnDerr, is a Filipino StarCraft II player.

== Early life and education ==
Caviar Acampado was born on December 2, 1992. He is the third of four children.

He has been playing the StarCraft II since he was 12 years old. He took up the game after seeing his older brother Carl "eXoSonnet" and his eventual mentor Mark Ryan "eXoBlazer" Rapisura play Starcraft despite initially finding the game "boring" and similar to Red Alert.

Acampado attended San Beda College for his high school studies. He later pursued a degree in game development at the CIIT College of Arts and Technology in Quezon City graduating in May 2021.

== Career ==
=== Professional career ===
EnDerr started competing in small local StarCraft II tournaments. As a Starcraft player, he mains the Zerg faction. He has been part of multiple esports team throughout his career including Mineski, Imperium, and Liyab Esports.

He first gained prominence in the local StarCraft scene, when he won the Starcraft Brawl Philippines Season 3 in 2009.

EnDerr took part at the 2011 The Games Xpo (TGX) 2011 in Thailand where he won the StarCraft competition. Among other international tournaments he won are 2012 StarCraft II World Championship Series: SEA Nationals, the ESL ANZ Winter Cup, and the 2018 World Electronic Sports Games Southeast Asia (WESG SEA).

EnDerr failed to defend his title at the 2019 WESG SEA losing to Vietnamese player Tran "MeomaikA" Hong Phuc in the final.

He last competed at the Dreamhack StarCraft II Masters 2020 Winter: Oceania and Southeast Asia which he won. In August 2021, his team Liyab Esports decided not to renew his contract due to lack of tournament support for StarCraft and the team's decision to focus on other game titles.

=== National team ===
In August 2019, the Philippine national team or Sibol conducted a two-day combine with EnDerr as the sole lone direct invitee. He and Justin "Nuks" Santos were selected for the national StarCraft II team for the 2019 SEA Games in the Philippines. At the regional games in December, EnDerr won the StarCraft II gold medal in the esports event.

== Personal life ==
EnDerr has been in a romantic relationship with Moreen Guese, a former child actress who appeared in the television anthology series Maalaala Mo Kaya and the theater performance The Sound of Music. Guese is also a former esports athlete herself, who played Tekken. They first met in an esport event in Cebu around 2012.
