= Indonesia at the 2019 SEA Games =

- IOC code: INA
- NOC: Indonesian Olympic Committee
- Website: www.nocindonesia.or.id (in English)

in the Philippines 30 November - 11 December 2019
- Competitors: 837 in 56 sports
- Flag bearers: Ridjkie Mulia (water polo)
- Medals Ranked 4th: Gold 72 Silver 84 Bronze 111 Total 267

SEA Games appearances (overview)
- 1977; 1979; 1981; 1983; 1985; 1987; 1989; 1991; 1993; 1995; 1997; 1999; 2001; 2003; 2005; 2007; 2009; 2011; 2013; 2015; 2017; 2019; 2021; 2023; 2025; 2027; 2029

Indonesia was participating in the 2019 SEA Games from 30 November to 11 December 2019. The Indonesian contingent consist of 837 athletes, competing in 56 sports.

== Medal summary ==
=== Medal by sport ===
Medals by sport
Sport	1st place, gold medalist(s)	2nd place, silver medalist(s)	3rd place, bronze medalist(s)	Total	Rank
Archery	2	2	4	8	3
Arnis	0	0	0	0	NP
Athletics	5	6	5	16	4
Badminton	3	2	2	7	2
Baseball	0	0	1	1	3
Basketball	0	1	1	2	2
Billiards and snooker	0	1	2	3	7
Bowling	4	2	1	7	1
Boxing	0	2	4	6	4
Canoeing	7	4	1	12	1
Chess	2	3	1	6	1
Cycling	1	4	2	7	4
Dancesport	1	0	0	X	NA
Diving	0	0	0	0	NR
Duathlon	1	0	0	1	3
eSports	0	2	0	2	4
Figure skating	0	0	1	1	4
Fencing	0	1	1	2	6
Floorball	0	0	0	0	NR
Football	0	1	0	1	2
Golf	0	0	0	0	NR
Gymnastics	2	4	2	8	4
Beach Handball	0	0	0	0	NR
Ice hockey	0	0	0	0	NR
Indoor Hockey	0	0	0	0	NP
Judo	4	2	4	10	2
Ju-jitsu	1	2	1	4	4
Karate	2	3	4	9	4
Kickboxing	0	2	6	8	4
Kurash	0	3	3	6	4
Lawn Bowls	0	0	0	0	NR
Muaythai	0	0	5	5	6
Modern pentathlon	4	0	2	6	1
Netball	0	0	0	0	NP
Obstacle racing	0	0	3	3	3
Open Water Swimming	0	0	0	0	NR
Pencak Silat	2	3	2	7	1
Pètanque	0	0	0	0	NP
Polo	0	0	1	1	4
Rowing	3	0	2	5	1
Rugby sevens	0	0	0	0	NR
Sailing	0	0	0	0	NP
Sambo	4	1	2	7	1
Sepak Takraw	1	1	1	3	3
Shooting	7	6	2	15	1
Short track speed skating	0	4	1	5	4
Skateboarding	1	3	3	6	2
Soft tennis	0	1	1	2	3
Softball	0	1	1	2	3
Squash	0	0	3	3	4
Surfing	2	1	3	0	2
Swimming	1	6	7	14	6
Table tennis	0	0	0	0	NP
Taekwondo	0	2	8	10	6
Tennis	3	0	2	5	1
Triathlon	0	0	3	3	3
Underwater hockey	0	1	3	4	3
Volleyball & Beach Volleyball	2	1	1	3	1
Water polo	1	0	0	1	1
Waterskiing/ Wakeboarding	1	0	1	2	3
Weightlifting	4	1	5	10	2
Wrestling	0	0	0	0	NP
Wushu	2	5	2	9	3
Total	72	84	111	267	

Not Participated
Not Ranked
Not Awarded
no medals were awarded because only 2 competitors.

=== Medal by date ===
Medals by date
Day	Date	1st place, gold medalist(s)	2nd place, silver medalist(s)	3rd place, bronze medalist(s)	Total
1	1 December	1	4	5	11
2	2 December	5	7	7	19
3	3 December	6	9	6	21
4	4 December	5	7	11	23
5	5 December	11	9	10	30
6	6 December	12	5	8	25
7	7 December	11	9	11	31
8	8 December	15	13	21	49
9	9 December	4	16	25	45
10	10 December	2	6	7	15
11	11 December	0	0	0	-
Total		72	84	111	267

=== Medalists ===
Medal	Name	Sport	Event	Date
Gold	Rezza Putra; Ridjkie Mulia; Beby Willy Paksi Tarigam; Delvin Felliciano; Silvester Manik; Zaenal Arifin; Yusuf Budiman; Rian Rinaldo; Andi Uwayzulqarni; Fakhri Mahmud; Novian Putra; Made Dwicahya Arsana; Mochammad Alfariz	Water polo	Men's tournament	1 December
Gold	Dewi Desyana	Dancesport	Women's breakdance	1 December
Gold	Jauhari Johan	Duathlon	Men's individual	2 December
Gold	Windy Cantika Aisah	Weightlifting	Women's 49 kg	2 December
Gold	Rio Danu Utama Tjabu	Shooting	Men's WA1500 PPC	2 December
Gold	Tirano Baja	Shooting	Mixed light varmint air rifle	2 December
Gold	Eko Yuli Irawan	Weightlifting	Men's 61 kg	2 December
Gold	Edgar Xavier Marvelo	Wushu	Men's daoshu / gunshu	3 December
Gold	Edgar Xavier Marvelo; Harris Horatius; Seraf Naro Siregar	Wushu	Men's duilian	3 December
Gold	Puspa Arumsari	Pencak silat	Women's tunggal	3 December
Gold	Vidya Rafika Toyyiba	Shooting	Women's 10 m air rifle	3 December
Gold	Deni	Weightlifting	Men's 67 kg	3 December
Gold	Rifda Irfanaluthfi	Gymnastics	Women's vault	3 December
Gold	Billy Muhammad Islam; Hardy Rachmadian	Bowling	Men's doubles	4 December
Gold	Jonatan Christie; Anthony Sinisuka Ginting; Shesar Hiren Rhustavito; Firman Abdul Kholik; Fajar Alfian; Muhammad Rian Ardianto; Wahyu Nayaka; Ade Yusuf Santoso; Praveen Jordan; Rinov Rivaldy	Badminton	Men's team	4 December
Gold	Agus Adi Prayoko	Gymnastics	Men's vault	4 December
Gold	Rahmat Erwin Abdullah	Weightlifting	Men's 73 kg	4 December
Gold	Sharon Limansantoso; Tannya Roumimper	Bowling	Women's doubles	4 December
Gold	Dea Salsabila Putri	Modern pentathlon	Women's beach laser	5 December
Gold	Muhammad Taufik	Modern pentathlon	Men's beach laser	5 December
Gold	Suci Wulansari	Pencak silat	Women's tanding Class A	5 December
Gold	Fathur Gustafian; Vidya Rafika Toyyiba	Shooting	Mixed 10 m air rifle	5 December
Gold	Fafan Khoirul Anwar	Shooting	Mixed heavy varmint air rifle	5 December
Gold	Aiman Cahyadi	Cycling	Men's time trial	5 December
Gold	Hendra Pago; Saiful Rijal; Muhammad Muliang; Andi Saputra; Rizanov Kurniawan; Rizky Pago; Husni Uba; Mandeg Suharno; Diky Apriyadi	Sepak takraw	Men's team doubles	5 December
Gold	Iksan Apriyadi	Judo	Men's 73 kg	5 December
Gold	Ryan Leonard Lalisang; Aldila Andryati	Bowling	Mixed doubles	5 December
Gold	Senie Kristian	Sambo	Men's combat 90 kg	5 December
Gold	Ni Kadek Anny Pandini	Judo	Women's 57 kg	5 December
Gold	Agus Prayogo	Athletics	Men's marathon	6 December
Gold	Dea Salsabila Putri	Modern pentathlon	Women's beach triathle	6 December
Gold	Aldila Sutjiadi	Tennis	Women's singles	6 December
Gold	Agus Domosarjito	Shooting	Mixed silhouette air pistol	6 December
Gold	Maizir Ryondra	Canoeing	Men's K1 1000 m	6 December
Gold	Anwar Tarra; Yuda Firmansyah	Canoeing	Men's C2 1000 m	6 December
Gold	Gede Soethama	Judo	Men's 100 kg	6 December
Gold	Fajar	Sambo	Men's combat 57 kg	6 December
Gold	Ridha Wahdaniyati Ridwan	Sambo	Women's sport 80 kg	6 December
Gold	I Gede Wardana	Judo	Men's +100 kg	6 December
Gold	Ade Candra Rachmawan; Mohammad Ashfiya; Gilang Ramadhan; Danangsyah Pribadi	Volleyball	Men's beach volleyball	6 December
Gold	Desiana Syafitri; Emma Ramadinah; Erik Gustam; Rio Bahari	Sambo	Mixed team	6 December
Gold	Dea Salsabila Putri; Frada Saleh Harahap	Modern pentathlon	Mixed beach triathle relay	7 December
Gold	Denri Al Ghiffari; Ferdiansyah	Rowing	Men's pairs	7 December
Gold	Spens Stuber Mahue; Marjuki	Canoeing	Men's C2 200 m	7 December
Gold	Beatrice Gumulya; Jessy Rompies	Tennis	Women's doubles	7 December
Gold	Krisda Putri Aprilia	Karate	Women's individual kata	7 December
Gold	Ahmad Zigi Zaresta Yuda	Karate	Men's individual kata	7 December
Gold	Christopher Rungkat; Aldila Sutjiadi	Tennis	Mixed doubles	7 December
Gold	Team Indonesia	Canoeing	Men's 12-seater 200 m	7 December
Gold	Sanggoe Darma Tanjung	Skateboarding	Men's street	7 December
Gold	Sapwaturrahman	Athletics	Men's long jump	7 December
Gold	I Gede Siman Sudartawa	Swimming	Men's 50 m backstroke	7 December
Gold	Ahmad Rifqi Mukhlisin	Shooting	Mixed silhouette air rifle	8 December
Gold	Team Indonesia	Canoeing	Men's 4-seater 500 m	8 December
Gold	Riau Ega Agatha; Hendra Purnama; Arif Dwi Pangestu	Archery	Men's team recurve	8 December
Gold	Team Indonesia	Canoeing	Mixed 22-seater 500 m	8 December
Gold	Julianti; Yayah Rokayah	Rowing	Women's pairs	8 December
Gold	Ihram; Yanto Mahendra	Rowing	Men's lightweight double scull	8 December
Gold	Team Indonesia	Canoeing	Mixed 22-seater 1000 m	8 December
Gold	Dhea Novitasari	Surfing	Women's longboard	8 December
Gold	Hendra Purnama	Archery	Men's individual recurve	8 December
Gold	Hairil Anwar	Surfing	Men's shortboard	8 December
Gold	Billy Muhammad Islam	Bowling	Men's masters	8 December
Gold	Safira Widodo; Nur Tsurayya Priambodo; Emilia Hampp; Muhammad Zahidi Putu; Ade Hermana; Dimas Suprihono	Waterskiing	Mixed team cableski	8 December
Gold	Susanto Megaranto	Chess	Men's blitz	8 December
Gold	Medina Warda Aulia	Chess	Women's blitz	8 December
Gold	Maria Natalia Londa	Athletics	Women's long jump	8 December
Gold	Hendro Yap	Athletics	Men's 20 km walk	9 December
Gold	Praveen Jordan; Melati Daeva Oktavianti	Badminton	Mixed doubles	9 December
Gold	Greysia Polii; Apriyani Rahayu	Badminton	Women's doubles	9 December
Gold	Emilia Nova	Athletics	Women's 100 m hurdles	9 December
Gold	Muhammad Noor	Jujitsu	Men's 120 kg	10 December
Gold	Indonesia men's national volleyball team	Volleyball	Men's tournament	10 December
Silver	Dini Sari; Asmira; Lena; Nur Yanti; Evana Rahmawati	Sepak takraw	Women's hoop	1 December
Silver	Lisa Setiawati	Weightlifting	Women's 45 kg	1 December
Silver	Maria Magdalena Ince	Kurash	Women's –52 kg	1 December
Silver	Khasani Najmu Shifa	Kurash	Women's –63 kg	1 December
Silver	Harris Horatius	Wushu	Men's nandao / nangun	2 December
Silver	Tiara Andini Prastika	Cycling	Women's downhill	2 December
Silver	Fathur Gustafian	Shooting	Men's 10 m air rifle	2 December
Silver	Safrin Sihombing	Shooting	Men's WA1500 PPC	2 December
Silver	Muhammad Sandy Aziz; Rivaldo Thandra Pangesthio; Oki Wara Sanjaya; Surliyadin	Basketball	Men's 3x3 tournament	2 December
Silver	Rifda Irfanaluthfi	Gymnastics	Women's individual all-around	2 December
Silver	I Komang Ardiarta	Kurash	Men's –81 kg	2 December
Silver	Harris Horatius	Wushu	Men's nanquan	3 December
Silver	Tannya Roumimper	Bowling	Women's singles	3 December
Silver	Gregoria Mariska Tunjung; Fitriani; Ruselli Hartawan; Greysia Polii; Apriyani Rahayu; Ni Ketut Mahadewi Istarani; Siti Fadia Silva Ramadhanti; Ribka Sugiarto; Melati Daeva Oktavianti; Pitha Haningtyas Mentari	Badminton	Women's team	3 December
Silver	Ade Permana	Wushu	Men's –48 kg	3 December
Silver	Laksamana Pandu Pratama	Wushu	Men's –52 kg	3 December
Silver	Yusuf Widiyanto	Wushu	Men's –56 kg	3 December
Silver	Ummi Fisabilillah	Chess	Women's rapid	3 December
Silver	Ratu Afifah Nur Indah; Dhinda Salsabila; Rahmah Osya Samudra; Gita Widya Yunika	Short track speed skating	Women's 3000 m relay	3 December
Silver	Steavanus Wihardja	Short track speed skating	Men's 500 m	3 December
Silver	Pratiwi Kartikasari	Shooting	Women's WA1500 PPC	4 December
Silver	Ayu Fitriasih; Pratiwi Kartikasari; Eva Triana	Shooting	Women's WA1500 PPC team	4 December
Silver	Rifda Irfanaluthfi	Gymnastics	Women's balance beam	4 December
Silver	Indah Ratu Nur	Short track speed skating	Women's 1000 m	4 December
Silver	Steavanus Wihardja	Short track speed skating	Men's 1000 m	4 December
Silver	Rifda Irfanaluthfi	Gymnastics	Women's floor	4 December
Silver	Azzahra Permatahani	Swimming	Women's 200 m individual medley	4 December
Silver	Mustakim Khoirudin	Pencak silat	Men's tanding Class A	5 December
Silver	Jeni Kause	Pencak silat	Women's tanding Class B	5 December
Silver	Hanifan Yudani Kusumah	Pencak silat	Men's tanding Class D	5 December
Silver	Basral Hutomo	Skateboarding	Men's game of skate	5 December
Silver	Budi Prasetiyo	Judo	Men's 66 kg	5 December
Silver	Aflah Fadlan Prawira	Swimming	Men's 1500 m freestyle	5 December
Silver	Diah Permatasari	Fencing	Women's individual sabre	5 December
Silver	Jason Sim	Sambo	Men's combat 82 kg	5 December
Silver	Andhika Dariano; Andreas Yufan; Anthony Lemanwono; Christopher Lemanwono; Fariz Meghadito; Ferdinand Sabandar; Guntur Putera; Hadi Hidayat; Petrol Kambey; Ronald Susantio; Steven Thenedy; Teddy Muhammad	Underwater hockey	Men's 6x6 tournament	5 December
Silver	Totok Tri Martanto	Shooting	Mixed silhouette air pistol	6 December
Silver	Dhita Juliana; Putu Utami; Desi Ratnasari; Alyssah Mutakhara	Volleyball	Women's beach volleyball	6 December
Silver	Riska Andriyani	Canoeing	Women's C1 500 m	6 December
Silver	Farrel Armandio Tangkas	Swimming	Men's 200 m backstroke	6 December
Silver	Nurul Fajar Fitriyati	Swimming	Women's 200 m backstroke	6 December
Silver	Aiman Cahyadi; Odie Setiawan; Muhammad Abdurrohman; Robin Manullang	Cycling	Men's team time trial	7 December
Silver	Riska Andriyani	Canoeing	Women's C1 200 m	7 December
Silver	Anadeleyda Kawengian	Soft tennis	Women's singles	7 December
Silver	Ni Kadek Pandini; Syerina; I Gusti Ayu Kakihara; I Dewa Ayu Widari	Judo	Women's team	7 December
Silver	Team Indonesia	Canoeing	Women's 4-seater 200 m	7 December
Silver	Team Indonesia	Canoeing	Mixed 22-seater 200 m	7 December
Silver	Agus Prayogo	Athletics	Men's 10,000 m	7 December
Silver	Mohamad Ervan	Chess	Men's ASEAN Chess	7 December
Silver	Maria Natalia Londa	Athletics	Women's triple jump	7 December
Silver	Indonesia women's national softball team	Softball	Women's tournament	8 December
Silver	Aubrey Rasendriya	Shooting	Mixed silhouette air rifle	8 December
Silver	Riau Ega Agatha; Diananda Choirunisa	Archery	Mixed team recurve	8 December
Silver	Aiman Cahyadi; Jamalidin Novardianto; Muhammad Abdurrohman; Odie Setiawan; Robin Manullang	Cycling	Men's team road race	8 December
Silver	Rio Waida	Surfing	Men's shortboard	8 December
Silver	Ryan Leonard Lalisang	Bowling	Men's masters	8 December
Silver	Rifki Arrosyiid	Karate	Men's kumite 60 kg	8 December
Silver	Bunga Nyimas Cinta	Skateboarding	Women's park	8 December
Silver	Chelsie Sihite	Chess	Women's blitz	8 December
Silver	Jason Lijnzaat	Skateboarding	Men's park	8 December
Silver	Agustina Mardika Manik	Athletics	Women's 1500 m	8 December
Silver	Aflah Fadlan Prawira	Swimming	Men's 400 m individual medley	8 December
Silver	Adriand Larsen Wong; Eko Julianto; Gustian; Teguh Imam Firdaus; Yurino Putra	Esports	Mobile Legends Bang Bang	8 December
Silver	Triya Resky Andriyani; Yurike Nina Bonita Pereira; Sri Ranti	Archery	Women's team compound	9 December
Silver	Toni Syarifudin	Cycling	Men's BMX time trial	9 December
Silver	Ceyco Zefanya	Karate	Women's kumite +61 kg	9 December
Silver	Aprilian Anggara; Muhammad Dharmawan; Muhammad Setiawan	Gymnastics	Aerobic mixed trio	9 December
Silver	Albiadi; Andi Dharmawan; Andi Mardana	Karate	Men's team kata	9 December
Silver	Ruselli Hartawan	Badminton	Women's singles	9 December
Silver	Kornelis Kwangu Langu	Boxing	Men's light flyweight	9 December
Silver	Hartawan Muliadi; Farhan Ardiansyah; Satria Wiratama; Gilang Falah; Hartanto Tjia	Esports	Arena of Valor	9 December
Silver	Richard Rengga	Ju-jitsu	Men's 56 kg	9 December
Silver	Endang	Boxing	Women's light flyweight	9 December
Silver	Reinaldy Atmanegara	Taekwondo	Men's 54 kg	9 December
Silver	Mariska Halinda	Taekwondo	Women's 53 kg	9 December
Silver	Abdul Hafiz	Athletics	Men's Javelin throw	9 December
Silver	I Gede Siman Sudartawa; Triady Fauzi Sidiq; Gagarin Nathaniel; Glenn Victor Sutanto	Swimming	Men's 4×100 m medley relay	9 December
Silver	Willy	Jujitsu	Men's 77 kg	10 December
Silver	Eki Febri Ekawati	Athletics	Women's shot put	10 December
Silver	Bonatua Lumbantungkup	Kickboxing	Men's 60 kg low kick	10 December
Silver	Aprilando Rumahpasal	Kickboxing	Men's 51 kg full contact	10 December
Silver	Fathrah Masum; Nony Andilah	Billiards and snooker	Women's 9-ball pool doubles	10 December
Silver	Indonesia national under-23 football team	Football	Men's tournament	10 December
Silver	Halomoan Edwin Binsar	Athletics	Men's 400 m hurdles	10 December
Bronze	Muhammad Ahlul Firman	Triathlon	Men's individual	1 December
Bronze	Nethavani Octaria	Triathlon	Women's individual	1 December
Bronze	Safika Refa Zahira	Figure skating	Women's singles	1 December
Bronze	Surahmat Wijoyo	Weightlifting	Men's 55 kg	1 December
Bronze	Peter Taslim	Kurash	Men's +90 kg	1 December
Bronze	Andy Prayoga	Cycling	Men's downhill	2 December
Bronze	Dino Bima Sulistianto	Pencak silat	Men's tunggal	2 December
Bronze	Wahyu Aji Putra	Shooting	Mixed light varmint air rifle	2 December
Bronze	Juliana Klarisa	Weightlifting	Women's 55 kg	2 December
Bronze	Muhammad Ahlul Firman; Nethavani Octaria; Jauhari Johan; Eva Desiana	Triathlon	Mixed relay	2 December
Bronze	Hendi Hadiat	Kurash	Men's –66 kg	2 December
Bronze	Siti Latifah	Kurash	Women's +70 kg	2 December
Bronze	Putri Andriani	Weightlifting	Women's 59 kg	3 December
Bronze	Rosalina Simanjuntak	Wushu	Women's –48 kg	3 December
Bronze	Abdul Haris Sofyan	Wushu	Men's +65 kg	3 December
Bronze	Irine Kharisma Sukandar	Chess	Women's rapid	3 December
Bronze	Bernadicta Study	Weightlifting	Women's 64 kg	3 December
Bronze	Dwi Samsul Arifin	Gymnastics	Men's rings	3 December
Bronze	Adnan Buchari; Pahrul Razi; Mudji Mulyani; Nadia Putri	Obstacle racing	Mixed team assist 400 m	4 December
Bronze	Patuan Pulungan; Laksaman Zalukhu; Mudji Mulyani; Nadia Putri	Obstacle racing	Mixed team relay 400 m	4 December
Bronze	Mudji Mulyani	Obstacle racing	Women's 100 m	4 December
Bronze	Tsabitha Ramadani	Weightlifting	Women's 71 kg	4 December
Bronze	Andhika Dariano; Andreas Yufan; Anthony Lemanwono; Christopher Lemanwono; Fariz Meghadito; Ferdinand Sabandar; Guntur Putera; Hadi Hidayat; Petrol Kambey; Ronald Susantio; Steven Thenedy; Teddy Muhammad	Underwater hockey	Men's 4x4 tournament	4 December
Bronze	Annisa Fabiola; Aulia Effendi; Carmelita Waluyo; Cyntia Kinasih; Geraldine Sahetapy; Josephine Suryanto; Livia Iriana; Maria Indriani; Meli; Paula Florina; Syifa Nuraini; Zefanya Hizkia	Underwater hockey	Women's 4x4 tournament	4 December
Bronze	Novita Anggi Ayuni; Angelina Runtukahu	Muaythai	Women's waikru	4 December
Bronze	Aflah Fadlan Prawira	Swimming	Men's 400 m freestyle	4 December
Bronze	Aulia Gaffar; Ivano Utomo; Jeremia Wihardja; Steavanus Wihardja	Short track speed skating	Men's 3000 m relay	4 December
Bronze	Lorens Walun; Muhammad Uchida	Muaythai	Men's waikru	4 December
Bronze	I Gede Siman Sudartawa	Swimming	Men's 100 m backstroke	4 December
Bronze	Limonu Hidayat	Pencak silat	Men's tanding Class B	5 December
Bronze	Anung Satrio Wibowo	Shooting	Mixed heavy varmint air rifle	5 December
Bronze	Bunga Nyimas Cinta	Skateboarding	Women's game of skate	5 December
Bronze	Hardy Rachmadian; Sharon Limansantoso	Bowling	Mixed doubles	5 December
Bronze	Anak Agung Istri Kania Ratih	Swimming	Women's 50 m backstroke	5 December
Bronze	Glenn Victor Sutanto	Swimming	Men's 50 m butterfly	5 December
Bronze	Triady Fauzi Sidiq	Swimming	Men's 200 m individual medley	5 December
Bronze	Rio Bahari	Sambo	Men's sport 82 kg	5 December
Bronze	Annisa Fabiola; Aulia Effendi; Carmelita Waluyo; Cyntia Kinasih; Geraldine Sahetapy; Josephine Suryanto; Livia Iriana; Maria Indriani; Meli; Paula Florina; Syifa Nuraini; Zefanya Hizkia	Underwater hockey	Women's 6x6 tournament	5 December
Bronze	Deni Fadhilah	Sambo	Men's combat 74 kg	5 December
Bronze	Muhammad Taufik	Modern pentathlon	Men's beach triathle	6 December
Bronze	Priska Madelyn Nugroho	Tennis	Women's singles	6 December
Bronze	Ayustina Delia Priatna	Cycling	Women's road race	6 December
Bronze	Marjuki	Canoeing	Men's C1 1000 m	6 December
Bronze	Tiara Arta Garthia	Judo	Women's 78 kg	6 December
Bronze	I Dewa Ayu Mira Widari	Judo	Women's +78 kg	6 December
Bronze	I Gusti Ayu Kakihara	Judo	Women's 70 kg	6 December
Bronze	Agung Wilant; Catur Yuliana; Satria Laksana	Squash	Mixed team	6 December
Bronze	Kakan Kusmana	Rowing	Men's lightweight single scull	7 December
Bronze	Kyandra Kaelani Susanto	Skateboarding	Women's street	7 December
Bronze	Rachmania Putri	Taekwondo	Women's individual recognized poomsae	7 December
Bronze	Maya Sheva	Karate	Women's kumite 50 kg	7 December
Bronze	Defia Rosmaniar; I Kadek Dwipayana	Taekwondo	Mixed pair recognized poomsae	7 December
Bronze	Budi Prasetyo; Iksan Apriyadi; I Kadek Karisna; Gregory Jeremy; Gede Soethama	Judo	Men's team	7 December
Bronze	Ruhil; Defia Rosmaniar; Rachmania Putri	Taekwondo	Women's team recognized poomsae	7 December
Bronze	Beatrice Gumulya; David Agung Susanto	Tennis	Mixed doubles	7 December
Bronze	Ruhil; Melinda Evelyna; Abdul Darwin; Muhammad Ibnu; Wawan Saputra	Taekwondo	Mixed team freestyle poomsae	7 December
Bronze	Wawan Saputra	Taekwondo	Men's individual freestyle poomsae	7 December
Bronze	Cintya Nariska; Frada Saleh Harahap	Modern pentathlon	Mixed beach laser relay	7 December
Bronze	Odekta Elvina Naibaho	Athletics	Women's 10000 m	8 December
Bronze	Diananda Choirunisa; Linda Lestari; Titik Kusumawardani	Archery	Women's team recurve	8 December
Bronze	Mutiara Putri	Rowing	Women's lightweight single scull	8 December
Bronze	Indonesia men's national softball team	Softball	Men's tournament	8 December
Bronze	Arip Nurhidayat	Surfing	Men's longboard	8 December
Bronze	Dean Permana	Surfing	Men's longboard	8 December
Bronze	Taina Izquierdo	Surfing	Women's shortboard	8 December
Bronze	Riau Ega Agatha	Archery	Men's individual recurve	8 December
Bronze	Anugerah Lucky; Dian Nababan; Emilia Hanandyta	Karate	Women's team kata	8 December
Bronze	Neepa Pramesti	Skateboarding	Women's park	8 December
Bronze	Nadya Sinaga	Waterskiing	Women's wakeboard	8 December
Bronze	Irsalina	Muaythai	Women's 45 kg	8 December
Bronze	Muhammad Vicky Muchlis	Muaythai	Men's 57 kg	8 December
Bronze	Irvan Aji Putra	Muaythai	Men's 63.5 kg	8 December
Bronze	Anggi Williansyah; Indra Jaya Kusuma; Nuraya Kadafie	Fencing	Men's team épée	8 December
Bronze	Hendra Pago; Syamsul Akmal; Victoria Prasetyo; Saiful Rijal; Muh. Hardiansyah Muliang; Andi Saputra; Rizanov Kurniawan; Rizky Pago; Husni Uba; Mandeg Suharno; Diky Apriyadi; Dedi Setiawan	Sepak takraw	Men's team regu	8 December
Bronze	Gagarin Nathaniel	Swimming	Men's 50 m breaststroke	8 December
Bronze	Azzahra Permatahani	Swimming	Women's 400 m individual medley	8 December
Bronze	Indonesia national baseball team: Aditya Muflih Mahmud; Akbar Aminudin; Alexander Aribowo; Andersen Lim; Andika Arlistianto; Anhar Rachman; Bachtiar Sanjaya; Diva Fabil; Faldy Zulfikar; Gunawan Khallista; Hadi Nur Muhammad; Hakeem Rahniady Putra Adi Yatim; Hasruddin; Jericho Junior; Jerry Rachman; Lutfi Shurianto; Nanda Dwi Saputra; Nazrey Lazuardi; Ranjani; Rawafi Yaputra Yanto Rozali; Ray Santoso; Rizdki Aditya; Rizki Ramadhan; Zidney Fahmidyan	Baseball	Men's tournament	8 December
Bronze	Shaleha Fitriana Yusuf	Taekwondo	Women's 62 kg	8 December
Bronze	Rizky Prasetyo	Taekwondo	Men's +87 kg	8 December
Bronze	Acep Krisnandar; Glendy Buyung; Rico Lianto; Billy Lumintang	Polo	0–2 low goal	9 December
Bronze	Rinov Rivaldy; Pitha Haningtyas Mentari	Badminton	Mixed doubles	9 December
Bronze	Prima Wisnu Wardhana; Sri Ranti	Archery	Mixed team compound	9 December
Bronze	Denda Firmansyah; Umi Sri Haryani	Gymnastics	Aerobic mixed pair	9 December
Bronze	Sandi Fermansah	Karate	Men's kumite 75 kg	9 December
Bronze	Daniel Hutapea	Karate	Men's kumite +75 kg	9 December
Bronze	Yoke Rizaldi Akbar	Archery	Men's individual compound	9 December
Bronze	Silpa Lau Ratu	Boxing	Women's bantamweight	9 December
Bronze	Wahyu Nayaka Arya Pankaryanira; Ade Yusuf Santoso	Badminton	Men's doubles	9 December
Bronze	Muhammad Raihan	Taekwondo	Men's 58 kg	9 December
Bronze	Nenni Marlini	Windsurfing	Women's RS:X 8.5 m U-19	9 December
Bronze	Grece Savon Simangunsong	Boxing	Men's welterweight	9 December
Bronze	Huswatun Hasanah	Boxing	Women's lightweight	9 December
Bronze	Agustina Mardika Manik	Athletics	Women's 800 m	9 December
Bronze	Kadir Ismail	Billiards and snooker	Men's 10-ball pool singles	9 December
Bronze	Elianus Enembe	Kickboxing	Men's 54 kg low kick	9 December
Bronze	Serial Efendi	Kickboxing	Men's 69 kg kick light	9 December
Bronze	Priscilla Hertati Lumban Gaol	Kickboxing	Women's 48 kg full contact	9 December
Bronze	Farrand Papendang	Boxing	Men's lightweight	9 December
Bronze	Indonesia women's national volleyball team	Volleyball	Women's tournament	9 December
Bronze	Satria Bagus Laksana; Agung Wilant; Rahmad Diyanto; Mohammad Faisal	Squash	Men's team	9 December
Bronze	Catur Yuliana; Maudy Nadiyah; Yaisha Yasandi; Nisa Fadillah	Squash	Women's team	9 December
Bronze	Alexander Sie; Sunu Wahyu Trijati; Mario Alibasa; Muhammad Anugerah; Ragil Wahyudiono; Fernando Sanger	Soft tennis	Men's team	10 December
Bronze	Yunus Paays	Jujitsu	Men's 94 kg	10 December
Bronze	Sapwaturrahman	Athletics	Men's triple jump	10 December
Bronze	Pretty Sihite	Athletics	Women's 3000 m steeplechase	10 December
Bronze	Atjong Tio Purwanto	Athletics	Men's 3000 m steeplechase	10 December
Bronze	Melpida Sitohang	Kickboxing	Women's 55 kg light kick	10 December
Bronze	Adrian Mattheis	Kickboxing	Men's 57 kg full contact	10 December
Bronze	Angelina Ticoalu; Silviana Lu	Billiards and snooker	Women's 9-ball pool doubles	10 December
Bronze	Brian Lawitan	Kickboxing	Men's 63.5 kg low kick	10 December
Bronze	Indonesia women's national basketball team	Basketball	Women's tournament	10 December

Not awarded for this event category
