= Bowling at the 2019 SEA Games – Women's doubles =

Bowling – Women's doubles at the 2019 SEA Games
- Venue: Coronado Lanes, Starmall EDSA-Shaw
- Location: Mandaluyong, Philippines
- Date: 4 December 2019
- Competitors: 28 from 8 nations

Medalists
gold medal	Sharon Limansantoso; Tannya Roumimper	Indonesia
silver medal	New Hui Fen; Shayna Ng	Singapore
bronze medal	Sin Li Jane; Esther Cheah	Malaysia

The women's doubles competition for bowling at the 2019 SEA Games in Philippines was held on 4 December 2019 at Coronado Lanes, Starmall EDSA-Shaw.

== Results ==
Detailed result as in below:

Rank	Team	Game						Total
Rank	Team	1	2	3	4	5	6	Total
1st place, gold medalist(s)	Indonesia (INA)	391	454	406	400	493	408	2552
	Sharon Limansantoso	176	242	194	199	247	209	1267
	Tannya Roumimper	215	212	212	201	246	199	1285
2nd place, silver medalist(s)	Singapore (SGP)	433	408	460	353	414	408	2476
	New Hui Fen	209	187	236	183	201	217	1233
	Shayna Ng	224	221	224	170	213	191	1243
3rd place, bronze medalist(s)	Malaysia (MAS)	379	385	405	450	429	410	2458
	Sin Li Jane	184	191	171	238	224	206	1214
	Esther Cheah	195	194	234	212	205	204	1244
4	Philippines (PHI)	423	396	380	363	419	415	2396
	Liza Del Rosario	201	197	204	182	203	256	1243
	Lara Posadas-Wong	222	199	176	181	216	159	1153
5	Malaysia (MAS)	395	360	384	426	373	450	2388
	Siti Safiyah Amirah	171	175	170	214	201	236	1167
	Shalin Zulkifli	224	185	214	212	172	214	1221
6	Philippines (PHI)	404	422	381	391	384	402	2384
	Alexis Sy	183	196	189	177	214	204	1163
	Bea Hernandez	221	226	192	214	170	198	1221
7	Singapore (SGP)	396	423	326	358	394	442	2339
	Daphne Tan	191	210	158	164	190	236	1149
	Cherie Tan	205	213	168	194	204	206	1190
8	Indonesia (INA)	345	468	404	349	389	349	2304
	Aldila Indryati	156	236	192	180	222	181	1167
	Nadia Pramanik	189	232	212	169	167	168	1137
9	Thailand (THA)	429	360	356	414	372	313	2244
	Kantaporn Singhabubpha	204	184	168	214	193	169	1132
	Yanee Saebe	225	176	188	200	179	144	1112
10	Thailand (THA)	397	339	364	310	294	374	2078
	Pitchapa Reongsiri	198	166	152	162	160	171	1009
	Khattiya Ngoenkham	199	173	212	148	134	203	1069
11	Brunei (BRU)	323	397	378	330	298	342	2068
	Dayangku Nadia Nabila	164	171	183	182	137	167	1004
	Fatin Nur Ashikin	159	226	195	148	161	175	1064
12	Brunei (BRU)	324	329	372	336	347	346	2054
	Siti Hawa Natasya	167	157	188	157	178	144	991
	Fatin Adilah Haji Mahadi	157	172	184	179	169	202	1063
13	Myanmar (MYA)	322	299	360	348	289	341	1959
	San Myint Myint	148	133	184	156	137	194	952
	May Hlay Yin	174	166	176	192	152	147	1007
14	Vietnam (VIE)	281	291	324	263	233	308	1700
	Nguyen Hien Thi	143	124	161	134	121	154	837
	Nguyen Chi Thi Yen	138	167	163	129	112	154	863
