= Bowling at the 2019 SEA Games – Mixed doubles =

Bowling – Mixed doubles at the 2019 SEA Games
- Venue: Coronado Lanes, Starmall EDSA-Shaw
- Location: Mandaluyong, Philippines
- Date: 5 December 2019
- Competitors: 56 from 8 nations

Medalists
gold medal	Ryan Lalisang; Aldila Indryati	Indonesia
silver medal	Ahmad Muaz; Siti Safiyah	Malaysia
bronze medal	Hardy Rachmadian; Sharon Limansantoso	Indonesia

The mixed doubles competition for bowling at the 2019 SEA Games in Philippines was held on 5 December 2019 at Coronado Lanes, Starmall EDSA-Shaw.

== Schedule ==
All times are Philippine Standard Time (UTC+8).

Date	Time	Squad
Thu, 5 December 2019	09:00	Squad A
Thu, 5 December 2019	14:00	Squad B

== Results ==
Detailed result as in below:

Rank	Team	Squad	Game						Total
Rank	Team	Squad	1	2	3	4	5	6	Total
1st place, gold medalist(s)	Indonesia (INA)	B	384	483	520	399	478	434	2698
	Ryan Lalisang	B	242	268	287	219	264	215	1495
	Aldila Indryati	B	142	215	233	180	214	219	1203
2nd place, silver medalist(s)	Malaysia (MAS)	B	483	447	442	505	407	388	2672
	Ahmad Muaz	B	258	223	245	268	203	197	1394
	Siti Safiyah	B	225	224	197	237	204	191	1278
3rd place, bronze medalist(s)	Indonesia (INA)	A	419	394	468	412	449	415	2557
	Hardy Rachmadian	A	210	213	243	245	225	205	1341
	Sharon Limansantoso	A	209	181	225	167	224	210	1216
4	Singapore (SGP)	A	444	423	490	386	458	341	2542
	Cheah Ray Han	A	237	207	279	206	237	170	1336
	New Hui Fen	A	207	216	211	180	221	171	1206
5	Singapore (SGP)	A	441	431	359	448	426	435	2540
	Basil Dill Ng	A	216	215	192	212	234	220	1289
	Daphne Tan	A	225	216	167	236	192	215	1251
6	Thailand (THA)	A	404	502	404	416	416	393	2535
	Atchariya Cheng	A	221	268	226	225	232	223	1395
	Pitchapa Reongsiri	A	183	234	178	191	184	170	1140
7	Thailand (THA)	B	425	442	382	420	430	429	2528
	Yannaphon Larpapharat	B	200	237	187	247	248	236	1355
	Yanee Saebe	B	225	205	195	173	182	193	1173
8	Philippines (PHI)	A	412	440	411	388	444	431	2526
	Kenneth Chua	A	236	225	209	162	209	214	1255
	Alexis Sy	A	176	215	202	226	235	217	1271
9	Singapore (SGP)	B	509	385	390	471	394	349	2498
	Alex Chong	B	260	160	216	215	215	179	1245
	Cherie Tan	B	249	225	174	256	179	170	1253
10	Malaysia (MAS)	A	430	427	373	422	408	405	2465
	Rafiq Ismail	A	193	205	191	254	217	180	1240
	Esther Cheah	A	237	222	182	168	191	225	1225
11	Indonesia (INA)	B	369	431	344	410	447	459	2460
	Yeri Ramadona	B	200	215	166	202	235	247	1265
	Nadia Pramanik	B	169	216	178	208	212	212	1195
12	Philippines (PHI)	A	364	417	383	546	381	368	2459
	Merwin Tan	A	158	204	200	278	185	182	1207
	Bea Hernandez	A	206	213	183	268	196	186	1252
13	Thailand (THA)	B	473	446	381	385	388	369	2442
	Annop Arromsaranon	B	194	210	192	205	192	178	1171
	Kantaporn Singhabubpha	B	279	236	189	180	196	191	1271
14	Singapore (SGP)	B	316	350	452	451	386	472	2427
	Mohd Jaris Goh	B	171	164	237	236	208	216	1232
	Shayna Ng	B	145	186	215	215	178	256	1195
15	Indonesia (INA)	A	406	429	324	444	416	402	2421
	Billy Muhammad Islam	A	188	225	179	258	204	213	1267
	Tannya Roumimper	A	218	204	145	186	212	189	1154
16	Malaysia (MAS)	A	344	396	408	475	427	369	2419
	Tun Hakim	A	172	193	191	266	212	192	1226
	Sin Li Jane	A	172	203	217	209	215	177	1193
17	Malaysia (MAS)	B	402	435	334	370	419	449	2409
	Tan Chye Chern	B	235	237	168	180	229	237	1286
	Shalin Zulkifli	B	167	198	166	190	190	212	1123
18	Philippines (PHI)	B	398	467	395	361	342	408	2371
	Frederick Ong	B	218	192	199	167	164	203	1143
	Lara Posadas-Wong	B	218	192	199	167	164	203	1228
19	Thailand (THA)	A	416	370	339	388	386	384	2283
	Surasak Manuwong	A	206	213	184	216	230	193	1242
	Khattiya Ngoenkham	A	210	157	155	172	156	191	1041
20	Brunei (BRU)	B	371	383	409	352	372	395	2282
	Muhammad Al-Amin	B	199	193	242	176	171	180	1161
	Siti Hawa Natasya	B	172	190	167	176	201	215	1121
21	Philippines (PHI)	B	340	375	469	349	347	387	2267
	Patrick Nuqui	B	172	171	225	177	147	212	1104
	Liza Del Rosario	B	168	204	244	172	200	175	1163
22	Brunei (BRU)	B	396	321	428	396	328	353	2222
	Faiz Dzuhairy Dzafran	B	225	161	238	202	167	173	1166
	Fatin Adilah Haji Mahadi	B	171	160	190	194	161	180	1056
23	Myanmar (MYA)	A	374	361	401	393	307	341	2177
	Ang Htay Win	A	199	188	213	199	182	183	1164
	May Hlay Yin	A	175	173	188	194	125	158	1013
24	Brunei (BRU)	A	366	332	369	408	386	313	2174
	Abu Khaledi Yussrri	A	194	179	189	228	188	176	1154
	Dayangku Nadia Nabilah	A	172	153	180	180	198	137	1020
25	Brunei (BRU)	A	318	327	372	333	385	393	2128
	Awangku Haziqquddin Shah Wardi	A	134	148	178	162	199	192	1013
	Fatin Nur Ashikin	A	184	179	194	171	186	201	1115
26	Myanmar (MYA)	A	349	321	313	321	314	328	1946
	Tun Naing Lin	A	167	165	154	163	179	192	1020
	San Myint Myint	A	182	156	159	158	135	136	926
27	Vietnam (VIE)	A	391	356	293	294	281	315	1930
	Tran Tuan Anh	A	213	187	177	184	145	160	1066
	Nguyen Chi Thi Yen	A	178	169	116	110	136	155	864
28	Vietnam (VIE)	A	302	352	357	320	347	245	1923
	Pham Phu Gia	A	136	190	223	138	186	138	1011
	Nguyen Hien Thi	A	166	162	134	182	161	107	912
