= Badminton at the 2019 SEA Games =

- Venue: Muntinlupa Sports Complex
- Location: Muntinlupa, Metro Manila, Philippines
- Date: 1–9 December
- Competitors: 117 from 8 nations

The badminton competitions at the 2019 SEA Games in the Philippines were held at Muntinlupa Sports Complex in Muntinlupa, Metro Manila. The 2019 Games featured competitions in seven tournaments (3 men tournaments, 3 women tournaments, and 1 mixed tournament).

== Participating nations ==
A total of 117 athletes from 8 nations participated (the numbers of athletes are shown in parentheses).

- Cambodia (6)
- Indonesia (20)
- Malaysia (20)
- Myanmar (6)
- Philippines (16)
- Singapore (19)
- Thailand (19)
- Vietnam (11)

== Competition schedule ==
The following is the schedule for the badminton competitions: All times are on Philippine Standard Time (UTC+8):

Date	Time	Event	Phase
1 December 2019	09:00	Women's team	Quarter-finals
1 December 2019	15:00	Men's team	Quarter-finals
2 December 2019	09:00	Women's team	Semi-finals
2 December 2019	15:30	Men's team	Semi-finals
3 December 2019	10:00	Women's team	Final
4 December 2019	10:00	Men's team	Final
5 December 2019	09:00	Men's singles	Round of 16
5 December 2019	09:00	Women's singles	Round of 16
5 December 2019	09:00	Mixed doubles	Round of 16
6 December 2019	17:00	Men's doubles	Round of 16
6 December 2019	17:00	Women's doubles	Round of 16
7 December 2019	15:00	Men's singles	Quarter-finals
7 December 2019	15:00	Women's singles	Quarter-finals
7 December 2019	15:00	Men's doubles	Quarter-finals
7 December 2019	15:00	Women's doubles	Quarter-finals
7 December 2019	15:00	Mixed doubles	Quarter-finals
8 December 2019	13:00	Men's singles	Semi-finals
8 December 2019	13:00	Women's singles	Semi-finals
8 December 2019	13:00	Men's doubles	Semi-finals
8 December 2019	13:00	Women's doubles	Semi-finals
8 December 2019	13:00	Mixed doubles	Semi-finals
9 December 2019	12:00	Men's singles	Final
9 December 2019	12:00	Women's singles	Final
9 December 2019	12:00	Men's doubles	Final
9 December 2019	12:00	Women's doubles	Final
9 December 2019	12:00	Mixed doubles	Final

== Medal summary ==
=== Medal table ===
* Host nation (Philippines)

Rank	Nation	Gold	Silver	Bronze	Total
1	Malaysia (MAS)	3	2	5	10
2	Indonesia (INA)	3	2	2	7
3	Thailand (THA)	1	2	5	8
4	Singapore (SGP)	0	1	2	3
Totals (4 entries)		7	7	14	28

=== Medalists ===
Event	Gold	Silver	Bronze
Men's singles	Lee Zii Jia; Malaysia	Loh Kean Yew; Singapore	Kantaphon Wangcharoen; Thailand
Men's singles	Lee Zii Jia; Malaysia	Loh Kean Yew; Singapore	Sitthikom Thammasin; Thailand
Women's singles	Kisona Selvaduray; Malaysia	Ruselli Hartawan; Indonesia	Pornpawee Chochuwong; Thailand
Women's singles	Kisona Selvaduray; Malaysia	Ruselli Hartawan; Indonesia	Nitchaon Jindapol; Thailand
Men's doubles	Malaysia; Aaron Chia; Soh Wooi Yik	Thailand; Bodin Isara; Maneepong Jongjit	Malaysia; Ong Yew Sin; Teo Ee Yi
Men's doubles	Malaysia; Aaron Chia; Soh Wooi Yik	Thailand; Bodin Isara; Maneepong Jongjit	Indonesia; Wahyu Nayaka; Ade Yusuf
Women's doubles	Indonesia; Greysia Polii; Apriyani Rahayu	Thailand; Chayanit Chaladchalam; Phataimas Muenwong	Malaysia; Vivian Hoo; Yap Cheng Wen
Women's doubles	Indonesia; Greysia Polii; Apriyani Rahayu	Thailand; Chayanit Chaladchalam; Phataimas Muenwong	Malaysia; Chow Mei Kuan; Lee Meng Yean
Mixed doubles	Indonesia; Praveen Jordan; Melati Daeva Oktavianti	Malaysia; Goh Soon Huat; Shevon Jemie Lai	Malaysia; Tan Kian Meng; Lai Pei Jing
Mixed doubles	Indonesia; Praveen Jordan; Melati Daeva Oktavianti	Malaysia; Goh Soon Huat; Shevon Jemie Lai	Indonesia; Rinov Rivaldy; Pitha Haningtyas Mentari
Men's team	Indonesia; Jonatan Christie; Anthony Sinisuka Ginting; Shesar Hiren Rhustavito; Firman Abdul Kholik; Fajar Alfian; Muhammad Rian Ardianto; Wahyu Nayaka; Ade Yusuf; Praveen Jordan; Rinov Rivaldy	Malaysia; Lee Zii Jia; Soong Joo Ven; Aidil Sholeh Ali Sadikin; Lim Chong King; Aaron Chia; Soh Wooi Yik; Ong Yew Sin; Teo Ee Yi; Goh Soon Huat; Tan Kian Meng	Singapore; Loh Kean Yew; Joel Koh; Jason Teh; Elaf Tan; Terry Hee; Loh Kean Hean; Danny Bawa Chrisnanta; Andy Kwek; Abel Tan; Toh Han Zhuo
Men's team	Indonesia; Jonatan Christie; Anthony Sinisuka Ginting; Shesar Hiren Rhustavito; Firman Abdul Kholik; Fajar Alfian; Muhammad Rian Ardianto; Wahyu Nayaka; Ade Yusuf; Praveen Jordan; Rinov Rivaldy	Malaysia; Lee Zii Jia; Soong Joo Ven; Aidil Sholeh Ali Sadikin; Lim Chong King; Aaron Chia; Soh Wooi Yik; Ong Yew Sin; Teo Ee Yi; Goh Soon Huat; Tan Kian Meng	Thailand; Kantaphon Wangcharoen; Sitthikom Thammasin; Khosit Phetpradab; Suppanyu Avihingsanon; Bodin Isara; Maneepong Jongjit; Kittisak Namdash; Kittinupong Kedren; Nipitphon Phuangphuapet
Women's team	Thailand; Ratchanok Intanon; Busanan Ongbamrungphan; Pornpawee Chochuwong; Nitchaon Jindapol; Jongkolphan Kititharakul; Rawinda Prajongjai; Puttita Supajirakul; Chayanit Chaladchalam; Phataimas Muenwong; Savitree Amitrapai	Indonesia; Gregoria Mariska Tunjung; Fitriani; Ruselli Hartawan; Greysia Polii; Apriani Rahayu; Ni Ketut Mahadewi Istarani; Siti Fadia Silva Ramadhanti; Ribka Sugiarto; Melati Daeva Oktavianti; Pitha Haningtyas Mentari	Malaysia; Soniia Cheah Su Ya; Kisona Selvaduray; Lee Ying Ying; Eoon Qi Xuan; Chow Mei Kuan; Lee Meng Yean; Vivian Hoo; Yap Cheng Wen; Lai Pei Jing; Shevon Jemie Lai
Women's team	Thailand; Ratchanok Intanon; Busanan Ongbamrungphan; Pornpawee Chochuwong; Nitchaon Jindapol; Jongkolphan Kititharakul; Rawinda Prajongjai; Puttita Supajirakul; Chayanit Chaladchalam; Phataimas Muenwong; Savitree Amitrapai	Indonesia; Gregoria Mariska Tunjung; Fitriani; Ruselli Hartawan; Greysia Polii; Apriani Rahayu; Ni Ketut Mahadewi Istarani; Siti Fadia Silva Ramadhanti; Ribka Sugiarto; Melati Daeva Oktavianti; Pitha Haningtyas Mentari	Singapore; Yeo Jia Min; Jaslyn Hooi; Grace Chua; Sito Jia Rong; Jin Yujia; Insyirah Khan; Shinta Mulia Sari; Crystal Wong; Tan Wei Han
