= Kickboxing at the 2019 SEA Games =

- Venue: Cuneta Astrodome
- Location: Pasay, Philippines
- Dates: 7–10 December 2019

Kickboxing was among the sports contested at the 2019 SEA Games. There were eight events in kickboxing held from 7 to 10 December 2019 at the Cuneta Astrodome in Pasay.

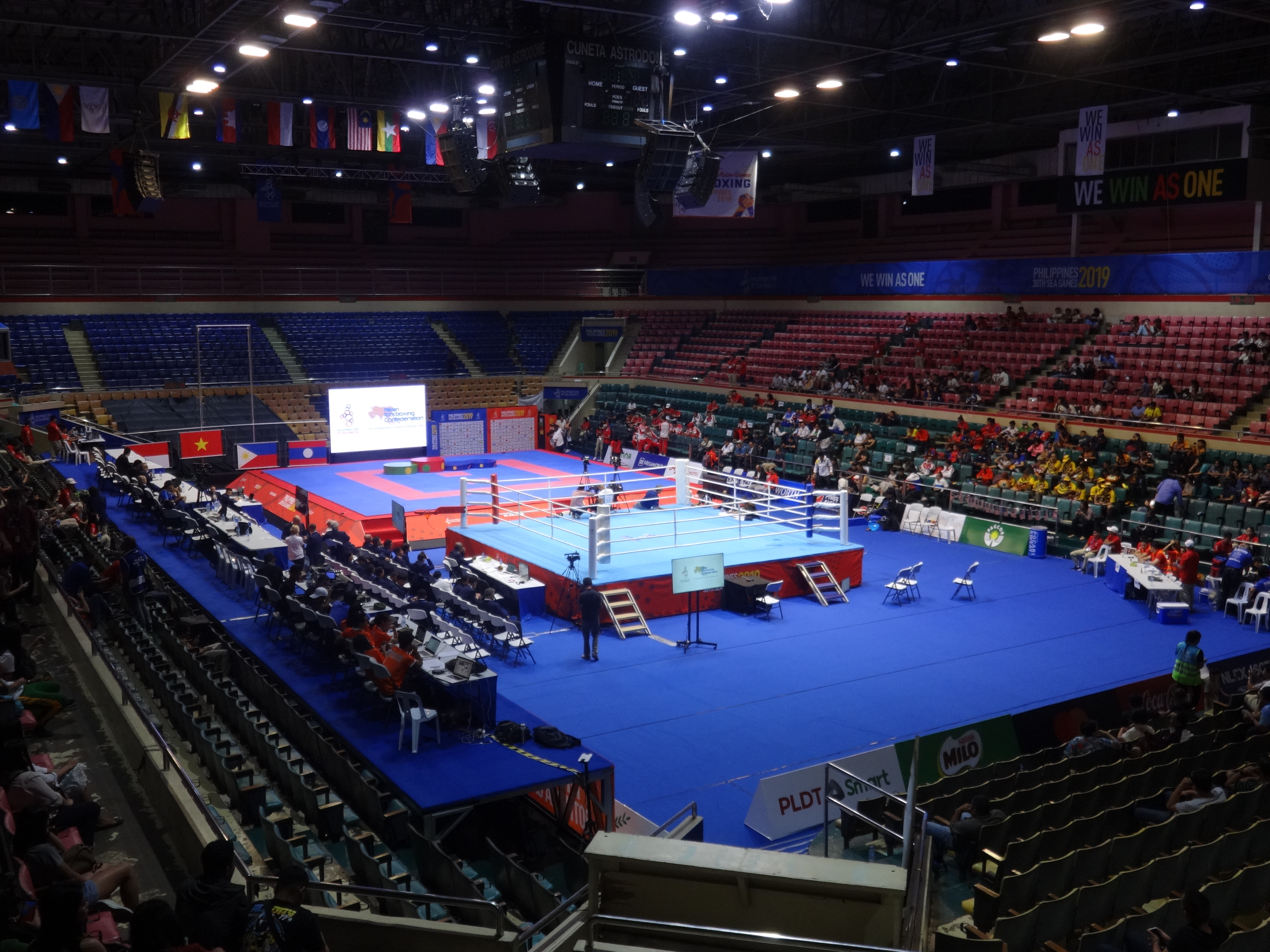
Cuneta Astrodome, the venue of the kickboxing event.

== Medal table ==
* Host nation (Philippines)

Rank	Nation	Gold	Silver	Bronze	Total
1	Vietnam (VIE)	4	0	2	6
2	Philippines (PHI)*	3	2	1	6
3	Laos (LAO)	1	0	3	4
4	Indonesia (INA)	0	2	6	8
5	Malaysia (MAS)	0	2	1	3
6	Thailand (THA)	0	2	0	2
7	Cambodia (CAM)	0	0	3	3
Totals (7 entries)		8	8	16	32

== Medalists ==
=== Kick light ===
Event	Gold	Silver	Bronze
Men's 69 kg	Jerry Olsim; Philippines	Sarayut Klinming; Thailand	Lao Chantra; Cambodia
Men's 69 kg	Jerry Olsim; Philippines	Sarayut Klinming; Thailand	Serial Efendi; Indonesia
Women's 55 kg	Gina Iniong; Philippines	Apichaya Mingkhwan; Thailand	Melpida Sitohang; Indonesia
Women's 55 kg	Gina Iniong; Philippines	Apichaya Mingkhwan; Thailand	Lại Thị Nga; Vietnam

=== Full contact ===
Event	Gold	Silver	Bronze
Men's 51 kg	Huỳnh Văn Tuấn; Vietnam	Aprilando Rumahpasal; Indonesia	Karol Maguide; Philippines
Men's 51 kg	Huỳnh Văn Tuấn; Vietnam	Aprilando Rumahpasal; Indonesia	Phan Cheuangvanheuang; Laos
Men's 57 kg	Nguyễn Xuân Phương; Vietnam	Awangku Awang Marajaya; Malaysia	Adrian Mattheis; Indonesia
Men's 57 kg	Nguyễn Xuân Phương; Vietnam	Awangku Awang Marajaya; Malaysia	Phailath Thammavongsa; Laos
Women's 48 kg	Nguyễn Thị Hằng Nga; Vietnam	Renalyn Dacquel; Philippines	Mala Chanthalacksa; Laos
Women's 48 kg	Nguyễn Thị Hằng Nga; Vietnam	Renalyn Dacquel; Philippines	Priscilla Hertati Lumban Gaol; Indonesia

=== Low kick ===
Event	Gold	Silver	Bronze
Men's 54 kg	Phạm Bá Hợi; Vietnam	Jomar Balangui; Philippines	Elianus Enembe; Indonesia
Men's 54 kg	Phạm Bá Hợi; Vietnam	Jomar Balangui; Philippines	Khem Chann; Cambodia
Men's 60 kg	Soukan Taipanyavong; Laos	Bonatua Lumban Tungkup; Indonesia	Chork Sivin; Cambodia
Men's 60 kg	Soukan Taipanyavong; Laos	Bonatua Lumban Tungkup; Indonesia	Muhammad Iffat Ripen; Malaysia
Men's 63.5 kg	Jean Claude Saclag; Philippines	Mohammed Mahmoud; Malaysia	Nguyễn Thế Hương; Vietnam
Men's 63.5 kg	Jean Claude Saclag; Philippines	Mohammed Mahmoud; Malaysia	Brian Lawitan; Indonesia
