= Modern pentathlon at the 2019 SEA Games =

- Venue: Subic Bay Boardwalk
- Location: Subic, Zambales, Philippines
- Date: 5–7 December

Modern pentathlon competitions made their debut at the 2019 Southeast Asian Games in Philippines and were held at the Subic Bay Boardwalk. Ironically, though an Olympic sport, it was not contested in the Olympic format.

== Medal table ==
* Host nation (Philippines)

Rank	Nation	Gold	Silver	Bronze	Total
1	Indonesia (INA)	4	0	2	6
2	Philippines (PHI)*	2	1	2	5
3	Thailand (THA)	0	5	0	5
4	Singapore (SGP)	0	0	2	2
Totals (4 entries)		6	6	6	18

== Medalists ==
Event	Gold	Silver	Bronze
Men's beach laser	Muhammad Taufik; Indonesia	Samuel German; Philippines	Marcus Ong; Singapore
Men's beach triathle	Michael Ver Comaling; Philippines	Phurit Yohuang; Thailand	Muhammad Taufik; Indonesia
Women's beach laser	Dea Salsabila Putri; Indonesia	Natpapat Sangngio; Thailand	Shermaine Tung; Singapore
Women's beach triathle	Dea Salsabila Putri; Indonesia	Sanruthai Aransiri; Thailand	Princess Honey Arbilon; Philippines
Mixed beach laser relay	Philippines; Princess Honey Arbilon; Samuel German	Thailand; Muktapha Changhin; Narongdech Taparak	Indonesia; Cintya Nariska; Frada Saleh Harahap
Mixed beach triathle relay	Indonesia; Dea Salsabila Putri; Frada Saleh Harahap	Thailand; Sanruthai Aransiri; Natthaphon Kesornphom	Philippines; Princess Honey Arbilon; Michael Ver Comaling
