= Weightlifting at the 2019 SEA Games =

- Venue: Ninoy Aquino Stadium
- Location: Manila, Philippines
- Date: 1–4 December 2019

The weightlifting competition at the 2019 SEA Games in the Philippines was held at the Ninoy Aquino Stadium in Manila.

== Medal summary ==
=== Medal table ===
* Host nation (Philippines)

Rank	NOC	Gold	Silver	Bronze	Total
1	Vietnam (VIE)	4	5	1	10
2	Indonesia (INA)	4	1	5	10
3	Philippines (PHI)*	2	3	2	7
4	Myanmar (MYA)	0	1	0	1
5	Malaysia (MAS)	0	0	2	2
Totals (5 entries)		10	10	10	30

=== Men ===
Event	Gold		Silver		Bronze	
55 kg	Lại Gia Thành; Vietnam	264	John Ceniza; Philippines	252	Surahmat Wijoyo; Indonesia	250
61 kg	Eko Yuli Irawan; Indonesia	309	Thạch Kim Tuấn; Vietnam	304	Aznil Bidin; Malaysia	283
67 kg	Deni; Indonesia	315	Đinh Xuân Hoàng; Vietnam	308	Nestor Colonia; Philippines	287
73 kg	Rahmat Erwin Abdullah; Indonesia	322	Phạm Tuấn Anh; Vietnam	304	Muhammad Erry Hidayat; Malaysia	300

=== Women ===
Event	Gold		Silver		Bronze	
45 kg	Vương Thị Huyền; Vietnam	172	Lisa Setiawati; Indonesia	169	Mary Flor Diaz; Philippines	159
49 kg	Windy Cantika Aisah; Indonesia	190 YWR	Pyae Pyae Phyo; Myanmar	180	Ngô Thị Quyên; Vietnam	172
55 kg	Hidilyn Diaz; Philippines	211	Nguyễn Thị Thúy; Vietnam	197	Juliana Klarisa; Indonesia	175
59 kg	Hoàng Thị Duyên; Vietnam	210	Margaret Colonia; Philippines	187	Putri Aulia Andriani; Indonesia	177
64 kg	Phạm Thị Hồng Thanh; Vietnam	214	Elreen Ando; Philippines	213	Bernadicta Babela Mei Study; Indonesia	186
71 kg	Kristel Macrohon; Philippines	216	Nguyễn Thị Vân; Vietnam	214	Tsabitha Alfiah Ramadani; Indonesia	203
