= Boxing at the 2019 SEA Games =

Boxing competitions

- Venue: Philippine International Convention Center Forum
- Location: Pasay, Metro Manila
- Dates: 4–9 December

Boxing at the 2019 SEA Games in the Philippines was held at the Philippine International Convention Center Forum in Pasay, Metro Manila from 4 to 9 December 2019.

Host Philippines emerged as the overall champion for the first time since 2005 after winning seven gold, three silver and two bronze medals. Twelve of 13 Filipino entries went on to win medals with Olympians Rogen Ladon and Charly Suarez and 2019 AIBA World Championships silver medalist Eumir Marcial leading the way.

World champions Josie Gabuco and Nesthy Petecio led the women’s squad with a gold medal apiece. Gabuco won a record fifth SEA Games gold medal while Petecio finally tasted success after being denied the top prize in 2013 and 2015. The only Filipino fighter who failed to bring home a medal was defending light heavyweight champion John Marvin, who lost to Vietnam’s Truong Dinh Hoang in the quarterfinals. Marvin was knocked down in the first round and went on to lose the bout via split decision.

Thailand, led by Chatchai Butdee and Wuttichai Masuk, finished second overall with five gold medals. Vietnam was the only other nation to win a gold medal in boxing, courtesy of Nguyen Thi Tam in the women’s flyweight division.

== Participation ==
=== Participating nations ===
- Cambodia (8)
- Indonesia (9)
- Laos (6)
- Malaysia (5)
- Myanmar (6)
- Philippines (13)
- Singapore (4)
- Thailand (10)
- Timor-Leste (4)
- Vietnam (10)

== Medalists ==
=== Men ===
Event	Gold	Silver	Bronze
Light flyweight (46–49 kg)	Carlo Paalam; Philippines	Kornelis Kwangu Langu; Indonesia	Muhamad Fuad Redzuan; Malaysia
Light flyweight (46–49 kg)	Carlo Paalam; Philippines	Kornelis Kwangu Langu; Indonesia	Sao Rangsey; Cambodia
Flyweight (52 kg)	Rogen Ladon; Philippines	Ammarit Yaodam; Thailand	Jose Barreto Quintas da Silva; Timor-Leste
Flyweight (52 kg)	Rogen Ladon; Philippines	Ammarit Yaodam; Thailand	Mohamed Hanurdeen Hamid; Singapore
Bantamweight (56 kg)	Chatchai-decha Butdee; Thailand	Nguyễn Văn Đương; Vietnam	Ian Clark Bautista; Philippines
Bantamweight (56 kg)	Chatchai-decha Butdee; Thailand	Nguyễn Văn Đương; Vietnam	Naing Latt; Myanmar
Lightweight (60 kg)	Charly Suarez; Philippines	Khunatip Pidnuch; Thailand	Vũ Thành Đạt; Vietnam
Lightweight (60 kg)	Charly Suarez; Philippines	Khunatip Pidnuch; Thailand	Farrand Papendang; Indonesia
Light welterweight (64 kg)	James Palicte; Philippines	Nguyễn Văn Hải; Vietnam	Yon Daroth; Cambodia
Light welterweight (64 kg)	James Palicte; Philippines	Nguyễn Văn Hải; Vietnam	Atichai Phoemsap; Thailand
Welterweight (69 kg)	Wuttichai Masuk; Thailand	Marjon Piañar; Philippines	Greece Savon Simangunsong; Indonesia
Middleweight (75 kg)	Eumir Marcial; Philippines	Nguyễn Mạnh Cường; Vietnam	Mohd Aswan Che Azmi; Malaysia
Middleweight (75 kg)	Eumir Marcial; Philippines	Nguyễn Mạnh Cường; Vietnam	Siv Songmeng; Cambodia
Light heavyweight (81 kg)	Anavat Thongkrathok; Thailand	Trương Đình Hoàng; Vietnam	Khir Akyazlan Azmi; Malaysia
Light heavyweight (81 kg)	Anavat Thongkrathok; Thailand	Trương Đình Hoàng; Vietnam	Frederico Soares Sarmento; Timor-Leste

=== Women ===
Event	Gold	Silver	Bronze
Light flyweight (48 kg)	Josie Gabuco; Philippines	Endang; Indonesia	Aye Nyein Htoo; Myanmar
Light flyweight (48 kg)	Josie Gabuco; Philippines	Endang; Indonesia	Trịnh Thị Diễm Kiều; Vietnam
Flyweight (51 kg)	Nguyễn Thị Tâm; Vietnam	Irish Magno; Philippines	Nao Srey Pov; Cambodia
Flyweight (51 kg)	Nguyễn Thị Tâm; Vietnam	Irish Magno; Philippines	Jutamas Jitpong; Thailand
Bantamweight (54 kg)	Nilawan Techasuep; Thailand	Đỗ Nhã Uyên; Vietnam	Aira Villegas; Philippines
Bantamweight (54 kg)	Nilawan Techasuep; Thailand	Đỗ Nhã Uyên; Vietnam	Silpa Lau Ratu; Indonesia
Featherweight (57 kg)	Nesthy Petecio; Philippines	Nwe Ni Oo; Myanmar	not awarded
Lightweight (60 kg)	Sudaporn Seesondee; Thailand	Riza Pasuit; Philippines	Vy Sreykhouch; Cambodia
Lightweight (60 kg)	Sudaporn Seesondee; Thailand	Riza Pasuit; Philippines	Huswatun Hasanah; Indonesia

== Medal table ==
* Host nation (Philippines)

Rank	Nation	Gold	Silver	Bronze	Total
1	Philippines*	7	3	2	12
2	Thailand	5	2	2	9
3	Vietnam	1	5	2	8
4	Indonesia	0	2	4	6
5	Myanmar	0	1	2	3
6	Cambodia	0	0	5	5
7	Malaysia	0	0	3	3
8	Timor-Leste	0	0	2	2
9	Singapore	0	0	1	1
Totals (9 entries)		13	13	23	49

== Results ==
=== Men’s Light Flyweight (49kg) ===
Quarterfinals		Semifinals		Finals
		Muhamad Fuad Mohd Redzuan (MAS)	0
Carlo Paalam (PHI)	5	Carlo Paalam (PHI)	5
Khamsathone Khamphouvanh (LAO)	0			Carlo Paalam (PHI)	5
Bui Cong Danh Loi (VIE)	2			Kornelis Kwangu Langu (INA)	0
Kornelis Kwangu Langu (INA)	3	Kornelis Kwangu Langu (INA)	5
		Sao Rangsey (CAM)	0

=== Men’s Flyweight (51kg) ===
Preliminaries
Moe Zaw Myint (MYA)	0
Aldoms Suguro (INA)	5

Quarterfinals
Rogen Ladon (PHI)	4
Aldoms Suguro (INA)	1
Mohamed Hanurdeen Bin Hamid (SGP)	4
Jemis Wong Lee Onn (MAS)	1
Bang Non (CAM)	2
Jose Barreto Quintas Da Silva (TLS)	3
Sakhone Lasavongsy (LAO)
Ammarit Yaodam (THA)	RSC

Semifinals
Rogen Ladon (PHI)	5
Mohamed Hanurdeen Bin Hamid (SGP)	0
Jose Barreto Quintas Da Silva (TLS)	1
Ammarit Yaodam (THA)	4

Finals
Rogen Ladon (PHI)	5
Ammarit Yaodam (THA)	0

=== Men’s Bantamweight (56kg) ===
Quarterfinals
Jill Mandagie (INA)	0
Chatchai-decha Butdee (THA)	5
Nguyễn Văn Đương (VIE)	5
Nanthavong Simphavong (LAO)	0
Nat Sieknin (CAM)	2
Naing Latt (MYA)	3

Semifinals
Chatchai-decha Butdee (THA)	5
Ian Clark Bautista (PHI)	0
Nguyễn Văn Đương (VIE)	5
Naing Latt (MYA)	0

Finals
Chatchai-decha Butdee (THA)	5
Nguyễn Văn Đương (VIE)	0

=== Men’s Lightweight (60kg) ===
Quarterfinals
Savon Ramos Monteiro (TLS)	0
Vu Thanh Dat (VIE)	5
Charly Suarez (PHI)	RSC
Paing Min Arkar (MYA)
Khunatip Pidnuch (THA)	RSC
Sim Viset (CAM)
Farrand Papendang (INA)	5
Arfiqanie Bin Ahmad Anshori (MAS)	0

Semifinals
Vu Thanh Dat (VIE)	0
Charly Suarez (PHI)	5
Khunatip Pidnuch (THA)	5
Farrand Papendang (INA)	0

Finals
Charly Suarez (PHI)	5
Khunatip Pidnuch (THA)	0

=== Men’s Light Welterweight (64kg) ===
Quarterfinals
Atichai Phoemsap (THA)	5
Libertus Gha (INA)	0
Jonezi Emanuel Quintas Da Silva (TLS)	1
Yon Daroth (CAM)	4
Tay Jia Wei (SGP)	1
Nguyen Van Hai (VIE)	4

Semifinals
Atichai Phoemsap (THA)	1
James Palicte (PHI)	4
Yon Daroth (CAM)
Nguyen Van Hai (VIE)	RSC

Finals
James Palicte (PHI)	5
Nguyen Van Hai (VIE)	0

=== Men’s Welterweight (69kg) ===
Semifinals		Finals
		Marjon Piañar (PHI)	0
Wuttichai Masuk (THA)	5	Wuttichai Masuk (THA)	5
Greece Simangunsong (INA)	0

=== Men’s Middleweight (75kg) ===
Quarterfinals		Semifinals		Finals
		Nguyen Manh Cuong (VIE)	KO
Kalanh Khotsombath (LAO)	0	Siv Songmeng (CAM)
Siv Songmeng (CAM)	5			Nguyen Manh Cuong (VIE)
				Eumir Marcial (PHI)	KO
		Eumir Marcial (PHI) (PHI)	KO
		Mohamed Aswan Bin Che Azmi (MAS)

=== Men's Light Heavyweight (81kg) ===
Quarterfinals		Semifinals		Finals
		Anavat Thongkrathok (THA)	4
Tun Ye Lin (MYA)	0	Khir Akyazlan Azmi (MAS)	0
Khir Akyazlan Azmi (MAS)	5			Anavat Thongkrathok (THA)	3
John Nobel Marvin (PHI)	2			Truong Dinh Hoang (VIE)	0
Truong Dinh Hoang (VIE)	3	Truong Dinh Hoang (VIE)	RSC
		Frederico Soares Sarmento (TLS)

=== Women’s Light Flyweight (48kg) ===
Quarterfinals
Htoo Aye Nyein (MYA)	5
Danisha Mathialagan (SGP)	0
Chuthamat Raksat (THA)	1
Josie Gabuco (PHI)	4
Trinh Thi Diem Kieu (VIE)	5
Daomayuly Chantilath (LAO)	0

Semifinals
Htoo Aye Nyein (MYA)	0
Endang Endang (INA)	5
Josie Gabuco (PHI)	5
Trinh Thi Diem Kieu (VIE)	0

Finals
Endang Endang (INA)	0
Josie Gabuco (PHI)	5

=== Women’s Flyweight (51kg) ===
Quarterfinals		Semifinals		Finals
		Jutamas Jitpong (THA)	1
Irish Magno (PHI)	5	Irish Magno (PHI)	4
Leona Hui Xin Yee (SGP)	0			Irish Magno (PHI)	1
Nguyễn Thị Tâm (VIE)	5			Nguyễn Thị Tâm (VIE)	4
Nelly (MYA)	0	Nguyễn Thị Tâm (VIE)	RSC
		Nao Srey Pov (CAM)

=== Women’s Bantamweight (54kg) ===
Quarterfinals
Aira Villegas (PHI)	5
Vilayphone Vongphachan (LAO)	0

Semifinals
Aira Villegas (PHI)	2
Nilawan Techasuep (THA)	3
Silpa Lau Ratu (INA)	0
Do Nha Uyen (VIE)	5

Finals
Nilawan Techasuep (THA)	5
Do Nha Uyen (VIE)	0

=== Women’s Featherweight (57kg) ===
Semifinals	Finals
Oo Nwe Ni (MYA)
BYE	Oo Nwe Ni (MYA)	0
Nesthy Petecio (PHI)	Nesthy Petecio (PHI)	5
BYE

=== Women’s Lightweight (60kg) ===
Quarterfinals		Semifinals		Finals
		Vy Sreykhouch (CAM)	0
Sudaporn Seesondee (THA)	4	Sudaporn Seesondee (THA)	5
Ha Thi Linh (VIE)	1			Sudaporn Seesondee (THA)	4
				Riza Pasuit (PHI)	1
		Riza Pasuit (PHI)	4
		Huswatun Hasanah (INA)	1
