= Chess at the 2019 SEA Games =

Chess at the 2019 Southeast Asian Games
- Venue: Traveler's Hotel Rialto Function Room
- Location: Subic, Zambales, Philippines
- Dates: 1–8 December

Chess at the 2019 Southeast Asian Games was the first SEA Games tournament since the 2013 edition in Naypyidaw. Chess will feature seven team events. Among these events are men's and women's blitz, rapid and standard while other categories such as bullet, lightning, armageddon and the Asian chess are also under consideration for inclusion. The National Chess Federation of the Philippines originally planned to host individual events but scrapped such plans. Chess is being held from 1 to 8 December 2019.

Three demonstration events were also held in chess.

== Medal summary ==
=== Medal table ===
* Host nation (Philippines)

Rank	Nation	Gold	Silver	Bronze	Total
1	Indonesia (INA)	2	3	1	6
2	Malaysia (MAS)	1	0	0	1
2	Singapore (SGP)	1	0	0	1
2	Thailand (THA)	1	0	0	1
5	Vietnam (VIE)	0	2	3	5
6	Myanmar (MYA)	0	0	1	1
Totals (6 entries)		5	5	5	15

=== Medalists ===
Event	Gold	Silver	Bronze
Men's rapid	Yeoh Li Tian; Malaysia	Nguyễn Ngọc Trường Sơn; Vietnam	Nguyễn Anh Khôi; Vietnam
Men's blitz	Susanto Megaranto; Indonesia	Lê Quang Liêm; Vietnam	Lê Tuấn Minh; Vietnam
Men's ASEAN	Uaychai Kongsee; Thailand	Mohamad Ervan; Indonesia	Wynn Zaw Htun; Myanmar
Women's rapid	Gong Qianyun; Singapore	Umi Fisabilillah; Indonesia	Irine Kharisma Sukandar; Indonesia
Women's blitz	Medina Warda Aulia; Indonesia	Chelsie Monica Ignesias Sihite; Indonesia	Hoàng Thị Bảo Trâm; Vietnam

=== Demonstration events ===
Event	Gold	Silver	Bronze
Online chess	Jan Emmanuel Garcia; Philippines	Lê Tuấn Minh; Vietnam	Muhammad Lutfi Ali; Indonesia
Men's fischer random	Lê Quang Liêm; Vietnam	Nguyễn Anh Khôi; Vietnam	Muhammad Lutfi Ali; Indonesia
Women's fischer random	Irine Kharisma Sukandar; Indonesia	Hoàng Thị Bảo Trâm; Vietnam	Chelsie Monica Ignesias Sihite; Indonesia
