= Gymnastics at the 2019 SEA Games – Men's rings =

Gymnastics – Men's rings at the 2019 SEA Games
- Venue: Rizal Memorial Coliseum
- Date: 1 – 3 December 2019
- Competitors: 11 from 5 nations

Medalists
gold medal	Đặng Nam (VIE)
silver medal	Carlos Yulo (PHI)
bronze medal	Dwi Arifin (INA)

The men's rings competition for gymnastics artistic at the 2019 SEA Games in Philippines was held from 1 to 3 December 2019 at Rizal Memorial Coliseum.

== Schedule ==
All times are Philippine Standard Time (UTC+8).

Date	Time	Round
Sunday, 1 December	14:00	Qualification
Tuesday, 3 December	18:30	Final

== Results ==
=== Final ===
Rank	Name	Difficulty	Execution	Penalty	Total
1st place, gold medalist(s)	Đặng Nam (VIE)	5.700	8.167		13.867
2nd place, silver medalist(s)	Carlos Yulo (PHI)	5.500	8.233		13.733
3rd place, bronze medalist(s)	Dwi Arifin (INA)	6.000	7.733		13.733
4	Lê Thanh Tùng (VIE)	5.100	8.300		13.400
5	Muhammad Aprizal (INA)	4.800	7.133		11.933
6	Tikumporn Surintornta (THA)	4.800	7.200		11.600
7	Zul Bahrin Mat Asri (MAS)	3.800	7.733		11.533
8	Ratthasat Karn Boon (THA)	4.500	6.600		11.100
