= Canoeing at the 2019 SEA Games =

Canoeing/Kayaking/Traditional boat racing at the 2019 SEA Games

Canoeing/Kayaking/Traditional boat racing at the 2019 SEA Games
- Pictograms for canoeing (up, left), kayaking (up, right), and traditional boat racing (down)
- Venue: Malawaan Park
- Location: Olongapo, Philippines
- Date: 3–8 December

The canoeing, kayaking, and traditional boat racing competitions at the 2019 Southeast Asian Games in Philippines was held at the Malawaan Park, Olongapo.

== Medal table ==
* Host nation (Philippines)

Rank	Nation	Gold	Silver	Bronze	Total
1	Indonesia (INA)	7	4	1	12
2	Thailand (THA)	2	3	5	10
3	Vietnam (VIE)	2	1	3	6
4	Myanmar (MYA)	1	3	2	6
5	Philippines (PHI)*	1	2	2	5
Totals (5 entries)		13	13	13	39

== Medalists ==
=== Canoeing and kayaking ===
Event	Gold	Silver	Bronze
Men's C1 200 m	Hermie Macaranas; Philippines	Myo Hlaing Win; Myanmar	Dương Anh Đức; Vietnam
Men's C1 1000 m	Pitpiboon Mahawattanangkul; Thailand	Hermie Macaranas; Philippines	Marjuki; Indonesia
Men's C2 200 m	Indonesia; Spens Stuber Mehue; Marjuki	Philippines; Hermie Macaranas; Ojay Fuentes	Vietnam; Nguyễn Quốc Toàn; Phan Ngọc Sang
Men's C2 1000 m	Indonesia; Anwar Tarra; Yuda Firmansyah	Myanmar; Sai Min Wai; Aung Phyo Hein	Vietnam; Bùi Thanh Phẩm; Trần Thành
Men's K1 1000 m	Maizir Riyondra; Indonesia	Trần Văn Vũ; Vietnam	Praison Buasamrong; Thailand
Women's C1 200 m	Trương Thị Phương; Vietnam	Riska Andriyani; Indonesia	Orasa Thiangkathok; Thailand
Women's C1 500 m	Trương Thị Phương; Vietnam	Riska Andriyani; Indonesia	Orasa Thiangkathok; Thailand

=== Traditional boat racing ===
Event	Gold	Silver	Bronze
Men's 4-seaters 500 m	Indonesia; Abdur Rahim; Andri Mulyana; Joko Andriyanto; Mugi Harjito; Muhamad Fajar Faturahman; Spens Stuber Mehue	Myanmar; Aung Paing Htet; Nay Htet Lin; Saw Moe Aung; Tun Tun Lin; Zaw Moe Aung; Zin Ko Htet	Thailand; Chaiyakarn Choochuen; Laor Iamluek; Suwan Kwanthong; Pipatpon Mansamer; Vinya Seechomchuen; Arun Thogme
Men's 12-seaters 200 m	Indonesia; Abdur Rahim; Andri Mulyana; Anwar Tarra; Dedi Saputra; Joko Andriyanto; Mochamad Wijaya; Mugi Harjito; Muhamad Fajar Faturahman; Muhammad Yunus Rustandi; Spens Stuber Mehue; Tri Wahyu Buwono; Yuda Firmansyah	Thailand; Chaiyakarn Choochuen; Laor Iamluek; Boonsong Imtim; Suwan Kwanthong; Pipatpon Mansamer; Santas Mingwongyang; Phawonrat Roddee; Noppadol Sangthuang; Mongkhonchai Sanitphakdi; Vinya Seechomchuen; Pornchai Tesdee; Arun Thogme; Natthawat Waenphrom; Tanawoot Waipinid	Myanmar; Aung Paing Htet; Htet Wai Lwin; Htoo Htoo Aung; Min Min Zaw; Naing Lin Oo; Nay Htet Lin; Sai Min Aung; Saw Moe Aung; Si Thu Eain; Tun Tun Lin; Zaw Htet; Zaw Min; Zaw Moe Aung; Zin Ko Htet
Women's 4-seaters 200 m	Myanmar; Hla Hla Htwe; Khin Phyu Hlaing; Kyi Lae Lae Wai; Lin Lin Kyaw; Su Wai Phyo; Win Win Htwe	Indonesia; Dayumin; Emiliana Deau; Maryati; Ramla Baharuddin; Ririn Astuti; Stevani Ibo	Thailand; Jirawan Hankhamla; Pranchalee Moonkasem; Patthama Nanthain; Nipaporn Nopsiri; Arisara Pantulap; Junjira Phimpornphirom
Mixed 22-seaters 200 m	Thailand; Kasemsit Borriboonwasin; Jaruwan Chaikan; Nattawut Kaewsri; Praewpan Kawsri; Pornprom Kramsuk; Pranchalee Moonkasem; Patthama Nanthain; Nares Naoprakon; Nipaporn Nopsiri; Arisara Pantulap; Sukanya Phoradok; Phawonrat Roddee; Chitsanupong Sangpan; Mongkhonchai Sanitphakdi; Suwalee Songkramrod; Pornchai Tesdee; Wasan Upalasueb; Natthawat Waenphrom; Tanawoot Waipinid; Phakdee Wannamanee	Indonesia; Abdur Rahim; Andri Mulyana; Ayuning Tika Vihari; Dedi Saputra; Emiliana Deau; Fajriah Nurbayan; Joko Andriyanto; Maizir Riyondra; Maryati; Masripah; Mochamad Wijaya; Mugi Harjito; Muhamad Fajar Faturahman; Muhammad Yunus Rustandi; Ramla Baharuddin; Riana Yulistrian; Rio Akbar; Ririn Astuti; Sutrisno; Tri Wahyu Buwono	Philippines; Raquel Almencion; Lealyn Baligasa; Joanna Barca; Christian Burgos; Norwell Cajes; Edmund Catapang; John Lester delos Santos; Rosalyn Esguerra; Mark Jhon Frias; Ava Kryszle Gako; Maria Theresa Mofar; Reymart Nevado; Daniel Ortega; Leojane Remarim; Rhea Roa; Pantaleon Roberto; Jonathan Ruz; John Paul Selencio; Jerome Solis; Christine Mae Talledo
Mixed 22-seaters 500 m	Indonesia; Abdur Rahim; Andri Mulyana; Anwar Tarra; Ayuning Tika Vihari; Dayumin; Dedi Saputra; Emiliana Deau; Joko Andriyanto; Masripah; Mochamad Wijaya; Mugi Harjito; Muhamad Fajar Faturahman; Muhammad Yunus Rustandi; Ramla Baharuddin; Raudani Fitra; Ririn Astuti; Spens Stuber Mehue; Stevani Ibo; Sutrisno; Tri Wahyu Buwono	Thailand; Kasemsit Borriboonwasin; Jaruwan Chaikan; Nattawut Kaewsri; Praewpan Kawsri; Pornprom Kramsuk; Pranchalee Moonkasem; Patthama Nanthain; Nares Naoprakon; Nipaporn Nopsiri; Arisara Pantulap; Sukanya Phoradok; Phawonrat Roddee; Chitsanupong Sangpan; Mongkhonchai Sanitphakdi; Suwalee Songkramrod; Pornchai Tesdee; Wasan Upalasueb; Natthawat Waenphrom; Tanawoot Waipinid; Phakdee Wannamanee	Philippines; Raquel Almencion; John Niña Andrade; Lealyn Baligasa; Joanna Barca; Arche Baylosis; Christian Burgos; Patricia Ann Bustamante; Norwell Cajes; Maribeth Caranto; Edmund Catapang; Roda Daban; John Lester delos Santos; Bernadette Espeña; Mark Jhon Frias; Ojay Fuentes; Ava Kryszle Gako; Aidelyn Lustre; Hermie Macaranas; Reymart Nevado; Rhea Roa
Mixed 22-seaters 1000 m	Indonesia; Abdur Rahim; Andri Mulyana; Anwar Tarra; Astri Dwijayanti; Dayumin; Emiliana Deau; Joko Andriyanto; Maizir Riyondra; Masripah; Mochamad Wijaya; Mugi Harjito; Muhamad Fajar Faturahman; Muhammad Yunus Rustandi; Ramla Baharuddin; Riana Yulistrian; Rio Akbar; Ririn Astuti; Spens Stuber Mehue; Stevani Ibo; Tri Wahyu Buwono	Thailand; Kasemsit Borriboonwasin; Jaruwan Chaikan; Nattawut Kaewsri; Praewpan Kawsri; Pornprom Kramsuk; Pranchalee Moonkasem; Patthama Nanthain; Nares Naoprakon; Nipaporn Nopsiri; Arisara Pantulap; Sukanya Phoradok; Phawonrat Roddee; Chitsanupong Sangpan; Mongkhonchai Sanitphakdi; Suwalee Songkramrod; Pornchai Tesdee; Wasan Upalasueb; Natthawat Waenphrom; Tanawoot Waipinid; Phakdee Wannamanee	Myanmar; Aung Khin Su Su; Aung Paing Htet; Aye Aye Thein; Hla Hla Htwe; Khin Phyu Hlaing; Kyi Lae Lae Wai; Lin Lin Kyaw; Min Min Zaw; Nay Htet Lin; Phyo Wai Lwin; Saw Moe Aung; Saw Myat Thu; Soe Sandar; Su Wai Phyo; Thet Phyo Naing; Tun Tun Lin; Win Win Htwe; Zaw Min; Zaw Moe Aung; Zin Ko Htet
