= Archery at the 2019 SEA Games =

- Venue: Clark Parade Grounds
- Location: Mabalacat, Philippines
- Date: 5–9 December

The archery competitions at the 2019 SEA Games in the Philippines were held from 5 to 9 December 2019 at Clark Parade Grounds in Mabalacat, Philippines.

== Medal table ==
* Host nation (Philippines)

Rank	Nation	Gold	Silver	Bronze	Total
1	Vietnam (VIE)	3	2	1	6
2	Thailand (THA)	3	1	2	6
3	Indonesia (INA)	2	2	4	8
4	Malaysia (MAS)	1	2	1	4
5	Philippines (PHI)*	1	0	0	1
6	Myanmar (MYA)	0	3	2	5
Totals (6 entries)		10	10	10	30

== Medalists ==
=== Recurve ===
Event	Gold	Silver	Bronze
Men's individual	Hendra Purnama; Indonesia	Htike Lin Oo; Myanmar	Riau Ega Agatha; Indonesia
Women's individual	Lộc Thị Đào; Vietnam	Pyae Sone Hnin; Myanmar	Thidar Nwe; Myanmar
Men's team	Indonesia; Riau Ega Agatha; Hendra Purnama; Arif Dwi Pangestu	Malaysia; Khairul Anuar Mohamad; Haziq Kamaruddin; Zarif Syahiir Zolkepeli	Thailand; Witthaya Thamwong; Denchai Thepna; Tanapat Pathairat
Women's team	Vietnam; Lộc Thị Đào; Đỗ Thị Ánh Nguyệt; Nguyễn Thị Phương	Myanmar; Thidar Nwe; Pyae Sone Hnin; Yamin Thu	Indonesia; Diananda Choirunisa; Linda Lestari; Titik Kusumawardani
Mixed team	Vietnam; Nguyễn Hoàng Phi Vũ; Lộc Thị Đào	Indonesia; Riau Ega Agatha; Diananda Choirunisa	Malaysia; Khairul Anuar Mohamad; Nur Afisa Abdul Halil

=== Compound ===
Event	Gold	Silver	Bronze
Men's individual	Nitiphum Chatachot; Thailand	Sirapop Chainak; Thailand	Yoke Rizaldi Akbar; Indonesia
Women's individual	Kanoknapus Kaewchomphu; Thailand	Fatin Nurfatehah Mat Salleh; Malaysia	Hlang Su Su; Myanmar
Men's team	Malaysia; Mohd Juwaidi Mazuki; Zulfadhli Ruslan; Khambeswaran Mohanaraja	Vietnam; Nguyễn Văn Đầy; Thạch Phi Hùng; Nguyễn Tiến Cương	Thailand; Nitiphum Chatachot; Sirapop Chainak; Dhansarit Itsarangkun Na Ayutthaya
Women's team	Thailand; Kanyavee Maneesombatkul; Kanoknapus Kaewchomphu; Kodchaporn Pratumsuwan	Indonesia; Triya Resky Andriyani; Yurike Nina Bonita Pereira; Sri Ranti	Vietnam; Châu Kiều Oanh; Lê Phương Thảo; Nguyễn Tường Vi
Mixed team	Philippines; Paul Marton de la Cruz; Rachelle Anne de la Cruz	Vietnam; Nguyễn Văn Đầy; Châu Kiều Oanh	Indonesia; Prima Wisnu Wardhana; Sri Ranti
