= Bowling at the 2019 SEA Games – Men's masters =

Bowling – Men's masters at the 2019 SEA Games
- Venue: Coronado Lanes, Starmall EDSA-Shaw
- Location: Mandaluyong, Philippines
- Date: 7–8 December 2019
- Nations: 8

Medalists
gold medal	Billy Muhammad Islam (INA)
silver medal	Ryan Leonard Lalisang (INA)
bronze medal	Muhd Jaris Goh (SGP)

The men's masters competition for bowling at the 2019 SEA Games in Philippines was held on 6 December 2019 at Coronado Lanes, Starmall EDSA-Shaw.

== Schedule ==
All times are Philippine Standard Time (UTC+8).

Date	Time	Squad
Sat, 7 December 2019	09:00	1st block
Sun, 8 December 2019	09:00	2nd block
Sun, 8 December 2019	13:30	Stepladder finals

== Results ==
=== Preliminary ===
Detailed result as in below:

Rank	Athlete	Game																Total
Rank	Athlete	1	2	3	4	5	6	7	8	9	10	11	12	13	14	15	16	Total
1	Billy Muhammad Islam (INA)	211; 10	193; 0	192; 10	256; 10	245; 10	256; 10	188; 0	212; 10	225; 10	215; 0	218; 5	196; 0	209; 10	276; 10	209; 10	200; 10	3616
2	Muhd Jaris Goh (SGP)	200; 10	202; 10	219; 10	212; 10	155; 0	247; 10	235; 10	212; 10	238; 0	236; 10	195; 0	215; 0	259; 10	159; 0	224; 0	180; 0	3478
3	Ryan Leonard Lalisang (INA)	254; 10	206; 10	186; 10	246; 10	181; 0	240; 10	189; 10	158; 10	205; 10	226; 5	225; 10	155; 0	193; 0	214; 0	236; 10	225; 5	3449
4	Ahmad Muaz (MAS)	236; 10	195; 0	181; 0	235; 10	224; 10	236; 10	234; 10	205; 0	172; 0	202; 0	188; 0	191; 10	205; 10	169; 10	191; 10	225; 5	3384
5	Yannaphon Larpapharat (THA)	180; 0	189; 10	191; 0	221; 10	178; 0	180; 0	170; 0	191; 0	202; 0	208; 10	248; 10	206; 10	257; 10	216; 10	224; 10	226; 10	3377
6	Yeri Ramadona (INA)	188; 0	234; 10	225; 10	192; 0	174; 0	206; 10	154; 0	206; 0	167; 0	203; 10	229; 10	194; 10	182; 0	214; 10	236; 10	212; 10	3306
7	Hardy Rachmadian (INA)	196; 0	192; 0	221; 10	202; 0	214; 10	208; 0	210; 10	185; 0	186; 0	174; 0	206; 10	225; 10	206; 10	204; 10	201; 0	190; 0	3290
8	Tun Hakim (MAS)	186; 0	210; 10	185; 0	236; 10	177; 0	160; 0	176; 0	204; 10	232; 10	231; 10	178; 0	195; 0	248; 0	199; 0	188; 10	213; 10	3288
9	Cheah Ray Han (SGP)	189; 0	173; 0	156; 0	195; 0	223; 10	200; 10	216; 10	203; 10	223; 10	187; 0	218; 5	215; 10	189; 10	222; 10	190; 0	196; 0	3280
10	Patrick Nuqui (PHI)	182; 0	214; 10	231; 10	203; 0	178; 10	163; 0	221; 10	192; 0	226; 10	215; 10	212; 10	183; 0	218; 10	182; 0	134; 0	191; 0	3225
11	Tan Chye Chern (MAS)	182; 0	190; 0	220; 0	174; 0	190; 10	170; 0	208; 0	212; 10	267; 10	224; 10	168; 0	253; 0	218; 10	185; 0	160; 0	143; 0	3214
12	Rafiq Ismail (MAS)	204; 10	211; 10	177; 0	227; 0	179; 0	182; 0	223; 10	178; 10	212; 10	160; 0	212; 0	232; 10	151; 0	210; 10	157; 0	202; 10	3197
13	Merwin Tan (PHI)	186; 0	202; 0	171; 10	194; 0	234; 10	195; 10	211; 10	258; 10	185; 0	181; 10	193; 10	170; 0	163; 0	191; 10	178; 0	165; 10	3167
14	Basil Dill Ng (SGP)	193; 10	175; 0	184; 0	236; 10	170; 10	192; 0	201; 0	145; 0	206; 0	187; 0	182; 0	169; 0	156; 0	235; 0	245; 10	226; 10	3152
15	Atchariya Cheng (THA)	213; 10	140; 0	221; 10	192; 10	177; 0	234; 10	181; 0	166; 0	189; 0	170; 0	178; 0	257; 10	206; 0	196; 0	171; 0	184; 0	3125
16	Surasak Manuwong (THA)	199; 10	181; 10	174; 0	161; 0	165; 0	227; 0	192; 0	152; 0	197; 10	226; 5	268; 10	238; 10	186; 0	167; 0	162; 10	163; 0	3123

=== Stepladder finals ===
Stepladder final round 1			Stepladder final round 2
			1	Billy Muhammad Islam (INA)	205	232
2	Muhd Jaris Goh (SGP)	191	3	Ryan Leonard Lalisang (INA)	216	224
3	Ryan Leonard Lalisang (INA)	204
