= Rowing at the 2019 SEA Games =

Rowing event

- Venue: Triboa Bay
- Location: Subic, Philippines
- Date: 6–8 December
- Nations: 6

Rowing at the 2019 SEA Games was held at Triboa Bay at Subic, Philippines from 6 to 8 December 2019.

== Participating nations ==
- Indonesia
- Malaysia
- Myanmar
- Philippines
- Thailand
- Vietnam

== Medal table ==
* Host nation (Philippines)

Rank	Nation	Gold	Silver	Bronze	Total
1	Indonesia (INA)	3	0	2	5
2	Philippines (PHI)*	3	0	1	4
3	Vietnam (VIE)	0	3	1	4
4	Thailand (THA)	0	3	0	3
5	Myanmar (MYA)	0	0	2	2
Totals (5 entries)		6	6	6	18

== Medalists ==
=== Men ===
Event	Gold	Silver	Bronze
Lightweight single sculls	Cris Nievarez; Philippines	Siripong Chaiwichitchonkul; Thailand	Kakan Kusmana; Indonesia
Lightweight double sculls	Indonesia; Mahendra Yanto; Ihram	Vietnam; Nguyễn Văn Hà; Nhữ Đình Nam	Philippines; Edgar Ilas; Roque Abala Jr.
Pairs	Indonesia; Denri Maulidzar al Ghiffari; Ferdiansyah	Thailand; Nuttapong Sangpromcharee; Jaruwat Saensuk	Vietnam; Lê Mậu Trường; Phan Mạnh Linh

=== Women ===
event	Gold	Silver	Bronze
Lightweight single sculls	Melcah Jen Caballero; Philippines	Rojjana Raklao; Thailand	Mutiara Rahma Putri; Indonesia
Lightweight double sculls	Philippines; Joanie Delgaco; Melcah Jen Caballero	Vietnam; Đinh Thị Hảo; Tạ Thanh Huyền	Myanmar; Shwe Zin Latt; Nilar Win
Pairs	Indonesia; Julianti; Yayah Rokayah	Vietnam; Lê Thị Hiền; Phạm Thị Huệ	Myanmar; Shwe Zin Latt; Nilar Win
