= Taekwondo at the 2019 SEA Games =

- Venue: Ninoy Aquino Stadium, Rizal Memorial Sports Complex
- Location: Malate, Manila
- Date: 7–9 December
- Nations: 9

Taekwondo competitions at the 2019 SEA Games were held from 7 to 9 December 2019 at the Ninoy Aquino Stadium in Malate, Manila, Philippines.

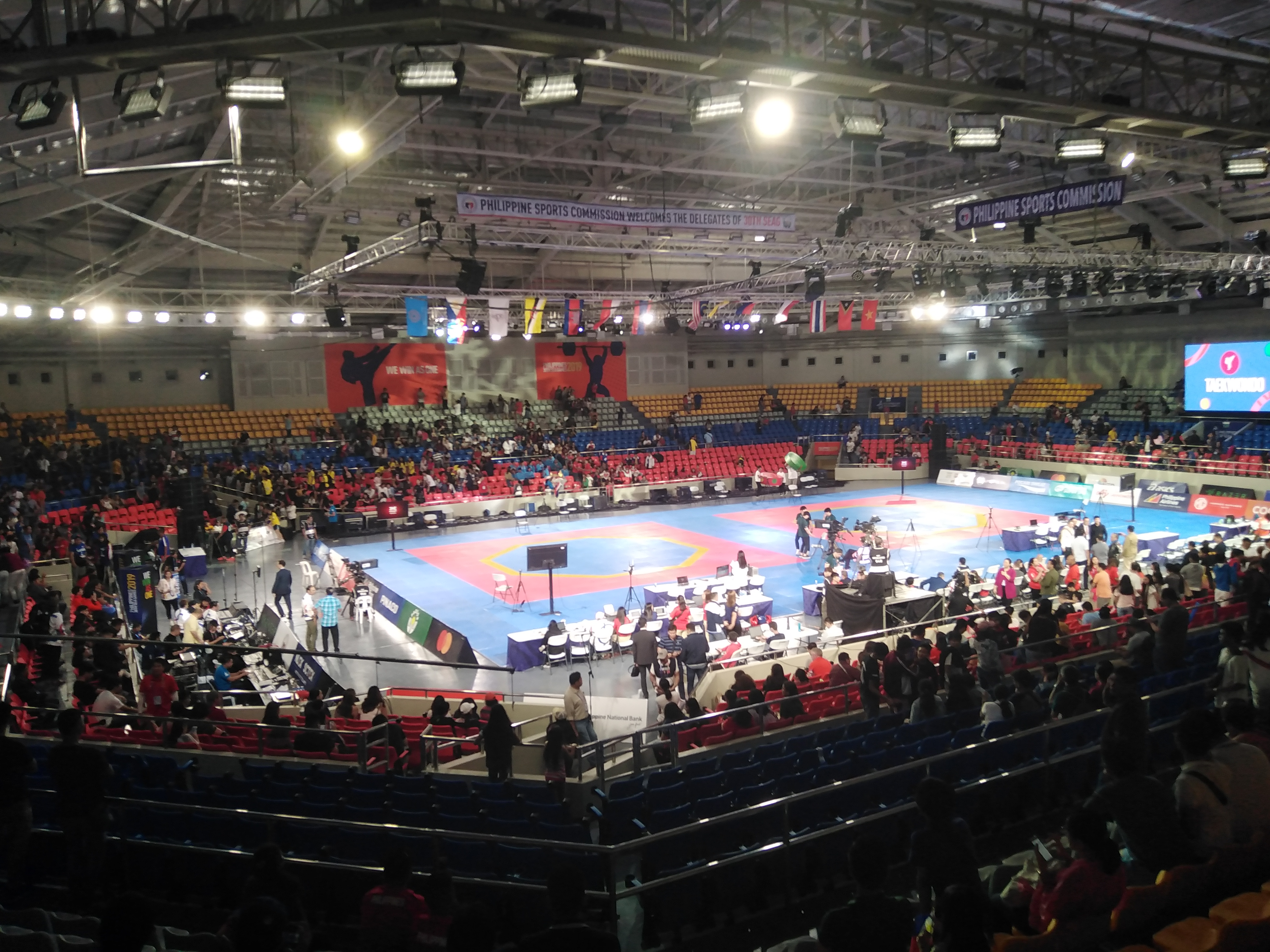
The Ninoy Aquino Stadium, the venue of taekwondo at the 2019 Southeast Asian Games.

== Participating nations ==
A total of 24 athletes from 9 nations participated (the numbers of athletes are shown in parentheses).

- Cambodia (2)
- Indonesia (2)
- Laos (1)
- Malaysia (4)
- Philippines (9)
- Singapore (1)
- Thailand (2)
- Timor-Leste (1)
- Vietnam (2)

== Medal table ==
* Host nation (Philippines)

Rank	Nation	Gold	Silver	Bronze	Total
1	Philippines (PHI)*	8	9	4	21
2	Thailand (THA)	7	3	6	16
3	Vietnam (VIE)	5	2	7	14
4	Malaysia (MAS)	1	2	5	8
5	Cambodia (CAM)	1	2	1	4
6	Indonesia (INA)	0	2	8	10
7	Timor-Leste (TLS)	0	1	3	4
8	Singapore (SGP)	0	1	0	1
9	Myanmar (MYA)	0	0	4	4
10	Laos (LAO)	0	0	2	2
Totals (10 entries)		22	22	40	84

== Medalists ==
=== Poomsae ===
Event	Gold	Silver	Bronze
Men's freestyle	Jeordan Dominguez; Philippines	Nguyễn Ngọc Minh Hy; Vietnam	Wawan Saputra; Indonesia
Men's freestyle	Jeordan Dominguez; Philippines	Nguyễn Ngọc Minh Hy; Vietnam	Phone Thet Naing; Myanmar
Women's freestyle	Nguyễn Thị Mộng Quỳnh; Vietnam	Janna Dominique Oliva; Philippines	Sakuna Laosoongnearn; Thailand
Mixed freestyle team	Vietnam; Châu Tuyết Vân; Hứa Văn Huy; Nguyễn Ngọc Minh Hy; Nguyễn Thị Lệ Kim; Trần Hồ Duy	Philippines; Juvenile Faye Crisostomo; Marvin Mori; Patrick King Perez; Darius Venerable; Janna Dominique Oliva	Indonesia; Evelyna Melinda; Ibnu Muhammad; Abdul Rahman Darwin; Wawan Saputra; Ruhil
Mixed freestyle team	Vietnam; Châu Tuyết Vân; Hứa Văn Huy; Nguyễn Ngọc Minh Hy; Nguyễn Thị Lệ Kim; Trần Hồ Duy	Philippines; Juvenile Faye Crisostomo; Marvin Mori; Patrick King Perez; Darius Venerable; Janna Dominique Oliva	Thailand; Kotchawan Chomchuen; Thanapat Bompenthomnumsuk; Thunsinee Mookda; Chawalit Khopana; Pichamon Limpaiboon
Men's recognized	Rodolfo Reyes Jr. Philippines	Pattarapong Sengmueang; Thailand	Sun Shine; Myanmar
Men's recognized	Rodolfo Reyes Jr. Philippines	Pattarapong Sengmueang; Thailand	Augustine Rudy Grocer; Malaysia
Women's recognized	Jocel Lyn Ninobla; Philippines	Ornawee Srisahakit; Thailand	Lê Trần Kim Uyên; Vietnam
Women's recognized	Jocel Lyn Ninobla; Philippines	Ornawee Srisahakit; Thailand	Rachmania Gunawan Putri; Indonesia
Men's recognized team	Philippines; Dustin Jacob Mella; Raphael Enrico Mella; Rodolfo Reyes Jr.	Vietnam; Lê Thanh Trung; Nguyễn Thiên Phụng; Trần Tiến Khoa	Malaysia; Augustine Rudy Grocer; Jason Loo; Yong Jin Kun
Women's recognized team	Thailand; Ornawee Srisahakit; Kotchawan Chomchuen; Phenkanya Phaisankiattikun	Philippines; Rinna Babanto; Aidaine Krishia Laxa; Jocel Lyn Ninobla	Vietnam; Lê Trần Kim Uyên; Ngô Thị Thùy Dung; Nguyễn Thị Kim Hà
Women's recognized team	Thailand; Ornawee Srisahakit; Kotchawan Chomchuen; Phenkanya Phaisankiattikun	Philippines; Rinna Babanto; Aidaine Krishia Laxa; Jocel Lyn Ninobla	Indonesia; Defia Rosmaniar; Rachmania Gunawan Putri; Ruhil
Mixed recognized pair	Malaysia; Jason Loo; Nurul Hidayah Karim	Philippines; Dustin Jacob Mella; Rinna Babanto	Thailand; Pattarapong Sengmueang; Phenkanya Phaisankiattikun
Mixed recognized pair	Malaysia; Jason Loo; Nurul Hidayah Karim	Philippines; Dustin Jacob Mella; Rinna Babanto	Indonesia; I Kadek Dwipayana; Defia Rosmaniar

=== Men's kyorugi ===
Event	Gold	Silver	Bronze
Finweight; 54 kg	Kurt Barbosa; Philippines	Reinaldy Atmanegara; Indonesia	Lobo Bonifacio Da Silva; Timor-Leste
Finweight; 54 kg	Kurt Barbosa; Philippines	Reinaldy Atmanegara; Indonesia	Hoàng Đức Anh; Vietnam
Flyweight; 58 kg	Ramnarong Sawekwiharee; Thailand	Ng Ming Wei; Singapore	Dex Ian Chavez; Philippines
Flyweight; 58 kg	Ramnarong Sawekwiharee; Thailand	Ng Ming Wei; Singapore	Muhammad Bassam Raihan; Indonesia
Bantamweight; 63 kg	Nareupong Thepsen; Thailand	Ahmad Nor Rakib; Malaysia	Phạm Đăng Quang; Vietnam
Bantamweight; 63 kg	Nareupong Thepsen; Thailand	Ahmad Nor Rakib; Malaysia	Kurt Pajuelas; Philippines
Featherweight; 68 kg	Lakchai Hauihongthong; Thailand	Arven Alcantara; Philippines	Somsanouk Phommavanh; Laos
Featherweight; 68 kg	Lakchai Hauihongthong; Thailand	Arven Alcantara; Philippines	Nguyễn Văn Duy; Vietnam
Lightweight; 74 kg	Dave Cea; Philippines	Nutthawee Klompong; Thailand	Lý Hồng Phúc; Vietnam
Lightweight; 74 kg	Dave Cea; Philippines	Nutthawee Klompong; Thailand	Syafiq Zuber; Malaysia
Welterweight; 80 kg	Samuel Morrison; Philippines	Joshua Amirul Abdullah; Malaysia	Kyaw Min Naing; Myanmar
Heavyweight +87 kg	Nattapat Tantramart; Thailand	Kristopher Uy; Philippines	Rizky Anugrah Prasetyo; Indonesia
Heavyweight +87 kg	Nattapat Tantramart; Thailand	Kristopher Uy; Philippines	Luqman Hakim Suhaimi; Malaysia

=== Women's kyorugi ===
Event	Gold	Silver	Bronze
Finweight; 46 kg	Julanan Khantikulanon; Thailand	Ana Da Costa Da Silva; Timor-Leste	Un Pich Chornai; Cambodia
Finweight; 46 kg	Julanan Khantikulanon; Thailand	Ana Da Costa Da Silva; Timor-Leste	Veronica Graces; Philippines
Flyweight; 49 kg	Panipak Wongpattanakit; Thailand	Rheza Aragon; Philippines	Julius Dhaysi Oo; Myanmar
Flyweight; 49 kg	Panipak Wongpattanakit; Thailand	Rheza Aragon; Philippines	Rosa Luisa Dos Santos; Timor-Leste
Bantamweight; 53 kg	Trần Thị Ánh Tuyết; Vietnam	Mariska Halinda; Indonesia	Baby Jesicca Canabal; Philippines
Bantamweight; 53 kg	Trần Thị Ánh Tuyết; Vietnam	Mariska Halinda; Indonesia	Phannapa Harnsujin; Thailand
Featherweight; 57 kg	Pauline Louise Lopez; Philippines	Aliza Chhoeung; Cambodia	Imbrolia De Araujo Dos Reis Amorin; Timor-Leste
Featherweight; 57 kg	Pauline Louise Lopez; Philippines	Aliza Chhoeung; Cambodia	Vipawan Siripornpermsak; Thailand
Lightweight; 62 kg	Phạm Thị Thu Hiền; Vietnam	Casandre Nicole Tubbs; Cambodia	Thanyanit Phuthanatwarin; Thailand
Lightweight; 62 kg	Phạm Thị Thu Hiền; Vietnam	Casandre Nicole Tubbs; Cambodia	Shaleha Fitriana Yusuf; Indonesia
Welterweight; 67 kg	Bạc Thị Khiêm; Vietnam	Laila Delo; Philippines	Nur Aqilah Suhaimi; Malaysia
Welterweight; 67 kg	Bạc Thị Khiêm; Vietnam	Laila Delo; Philippines	Sonesavanh Sirimanotham; Laos
Heavyweight +73 kg	Sorn Seavmey; Cambodia	Kirstie Alora; Philippines	Lâm Thị Hà Thanh; Vietnam
