= Cuneta Astrodome =

Indoor sporting arena in Pasay, Philippines

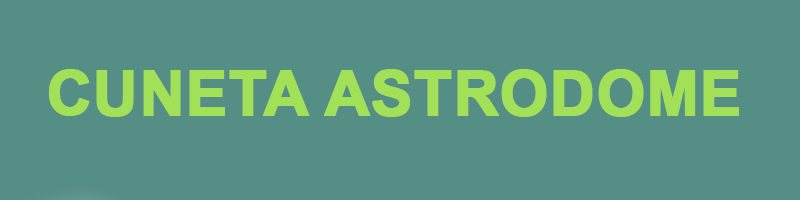

- Facade in 2012
- Interactive map of Cuneta Astrodome
- Former names: Astrodome; Pasay Astrodome
- Location: Roxas Boulevard cor. Derham Street, Pasay, Philippines
- Coordinates: 14°32′41″N 120°59′31″E
- Owner: Pasay City government
- Operator: Pasay City government
- Capacity: 12,000
- Public transit: 2 Antonio Arnaiz

Construction
- Groundbreaking: April 1991
- Opened: January 1993
- Cost: ₱140 million

Tenants
- PBA (1993–1999; 2001–2019); UAAP (1994–1999, 2004, 2006–2007); NCAA (2003, 2005, 2008, 2019, 2024); PBL (1993–1994, 2005); Philippine Super Liga (2014–2018); Pasay Voyagers (MPBL) (2018–2020, 2023–present); San Miguel Alab Pilipinas (2019–2020); MPL Philippines (playoffs only) (2025)

Cuneta Astrodome, also known as Pasay Astrodome or simply the Astrodome, is an indoor arena located in Pasay, Philippines. The arena has hosted Philippine Basketball Association games from 1993 to 1999 and again from 2001 onwards, and also currently serves as the home arena of the Pasay Voyagers of the Maharlika Pilipinas Basketball League. It also became the home of the now-defunct Philippine Super Liga from 2014 to 2018. It has also hosted a slew of other political and evangelical gatherings and church anniversaries.

Despite its name, the Cuneta Astrodome is not a dome-shaped indoor arena, since its exterior is rectangular in shape.

== History ==
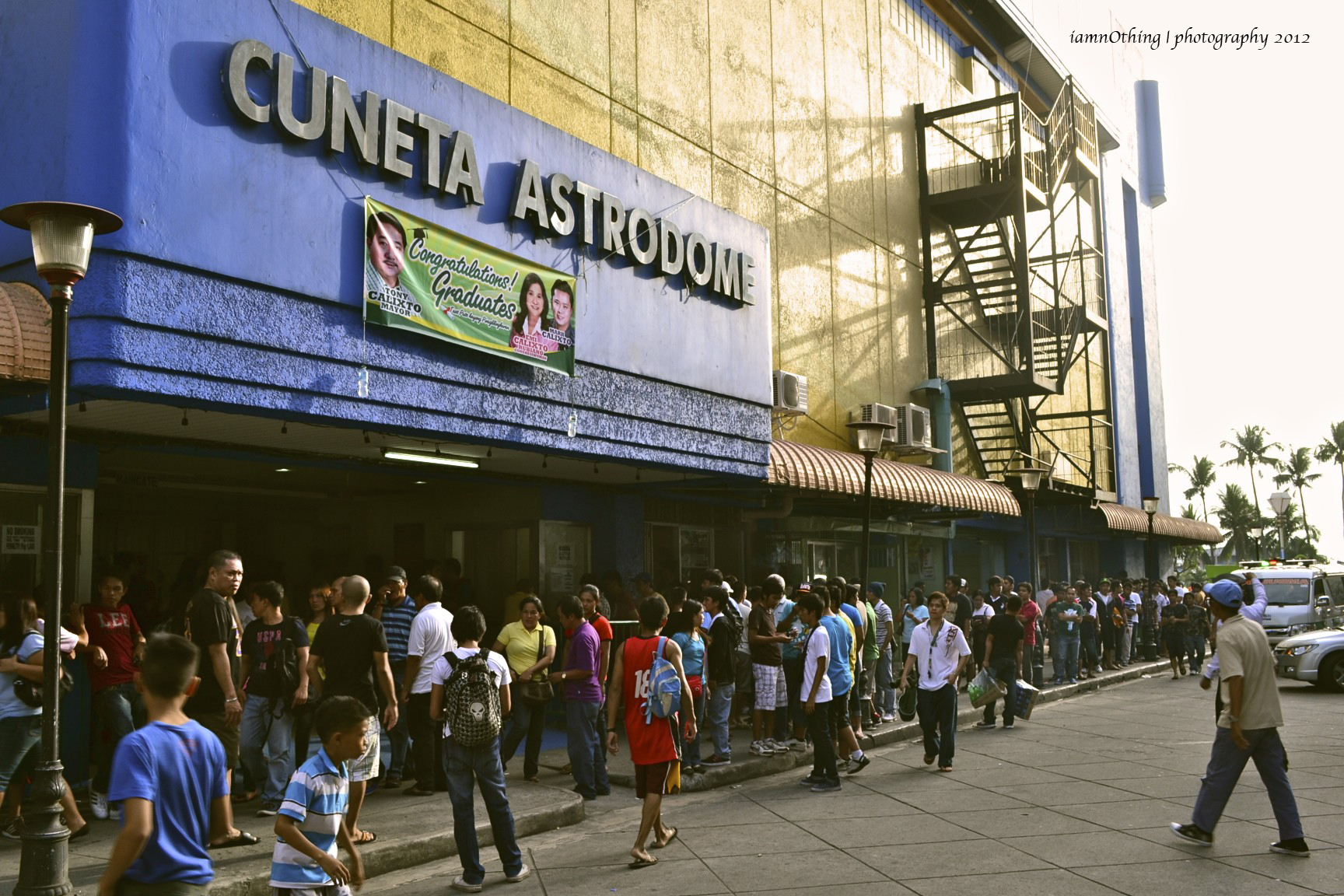
The Cuneta Astrodome in 2012

The Cuneta Astrodome was built to complement the adjacent Pasay City Sports Complex, which was in a dilapidated state prior the Cuneta Astrodome's construction. The arena is named after Enrique Cuneta, a prominent Pasay official in 1816 who is also the ancestor of Pablo Cuneta, who was mayor of Pasay in the 1990s. The indoor arena was built in 1993 from a loan grant from the Philippine National Bank.

== Facilities ==
The Cuneta Astrodome has a 12,000 seating capacity and air-conditioning system is installed to cool its interior.

== Basketball ==
=== Philippine Basketball Association ===
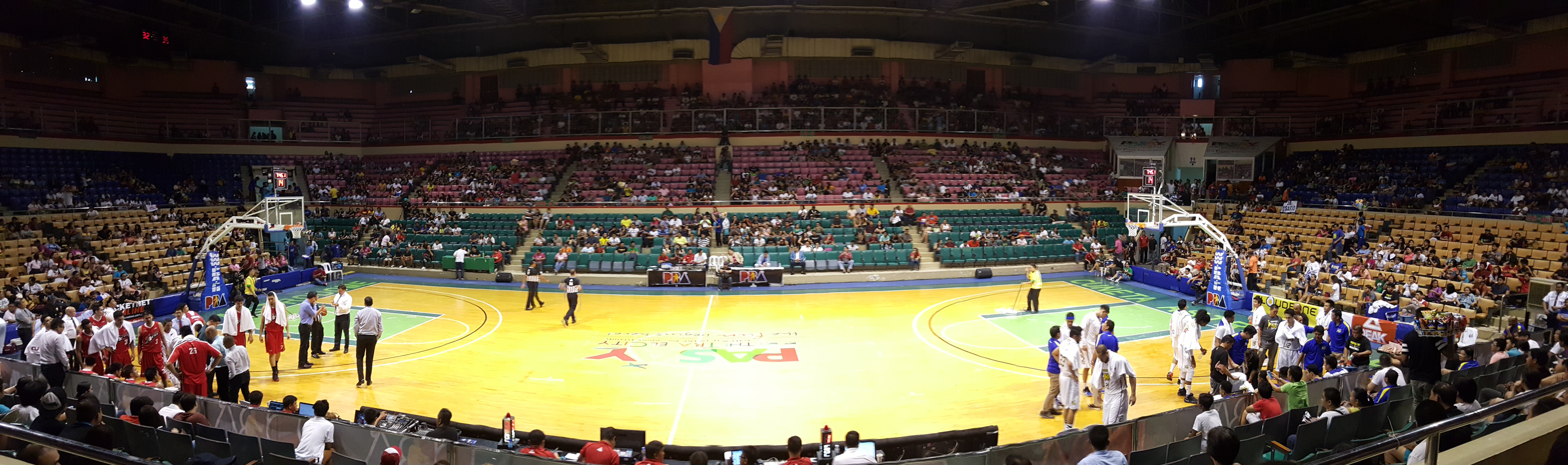
Panorama shot inside the Cuneta Astrodome during a PBA game in 2016

Built in 1993, the arena became the PBA's home after the league signed a five-year deal with the Pasay city government, which included the league's office within the Astrodome's vicinity. The league also manages maintenance and marketing of the Astrodome. During the first two years, the league played all of its games (except those played in provinces) exclusively at the Astrodome before limiting its schedule to Tuesday and Sunday games, as the league played its Friday games at the Araneta Coliseum in 1995.

In 1999, after the agreement expired, the league transferred its offices and most of its games to the PhilSports Arena, the PBA's home from 1985 to 1992. Although the league hosted a few games at the said venue, it was not used for the duration of the 2000 season. Since 2001, the league has hosted a lot of games at the Astrodome, including several recent PBA championship series games.

It has hosted more than 30 PBA championship series, most recently the Game 2 of the 2011 PBA Commissioner's Cup finals.

It is one of the alternate venues of the league, together with the PhilSports Arena in Pasig and Ynares Center in Antipolo if either the Smart Araneta Coliseum and the SM Mall of Asia Arena are not available.

=== Maharlika Pilipinas Basketball League ===
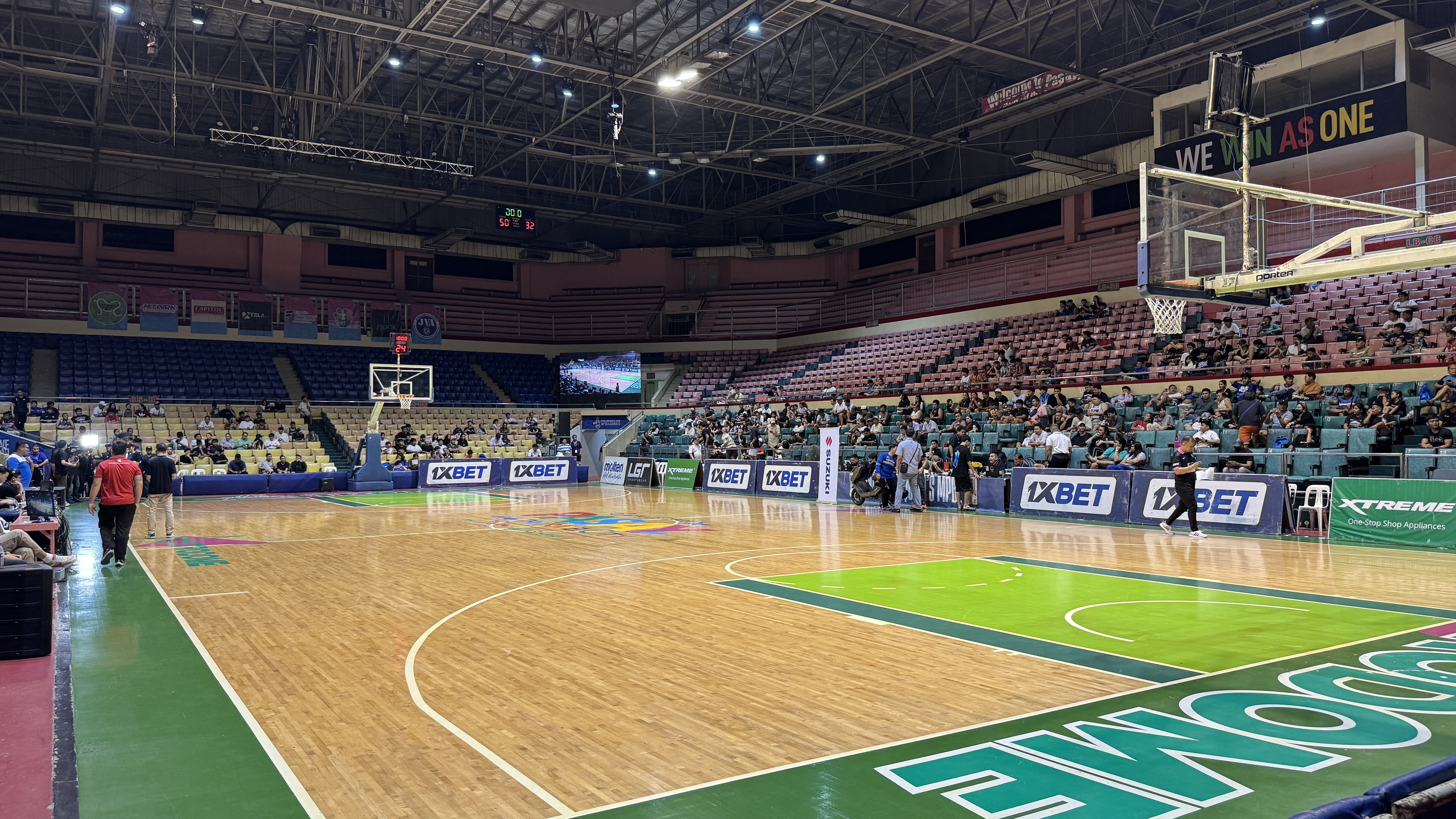
The MPBL's Pasay Voyagers have called Cuneta Astrodome home since joining the league in 2018.

The Pasay Voyagers of the Maharlika Pilipinas Basketball League have played all of their home games in the Astrodome since the team's establishment in the 2018–19 MPBL season.

=== Metropolitan Basketball Association ===
The Metropolitan Basketball Association held two games at the Astrodome during the opening game of its 1999 season on February 7, 1999. The first between San Juan Knights led by Bonel Balingit and Chris Calaguio and the Nueva Ecija Patriots led by Willie Miller, the other is between Pasig-Rizal Pirates led by Bong Ravena and the Manila Metrostars led by Rommel Adducul and Alex Compton.

=== Amateur and collegiate leagues ===
Aside from hosting PBA games, it also held several collegiate leagues such as the UAAP, NCAA, NAASCU, WNCAA and the UCAA. The UAAP held the men's senior basketball championships in 1994 and 1999. The NCAA hosted some championship matchups in the 2003 finals, 2005 and 2008 with the most recent in 2003, when Letran defeated San Sebastian in the third and final game of the series, the only time it was held at the venue during the series.

In 2005 and 2008, the NCAA held majority of its games at the Astrodome while the UAAP played a series of games in the 2004 and 2007 seasons.

It also hosted the Philippine Basketball League during the mid-1990s and during the 2005 PBL Unity Cup finals between the champion Welcoat Paintmasters and the Montana Jewels.

== Other events ==
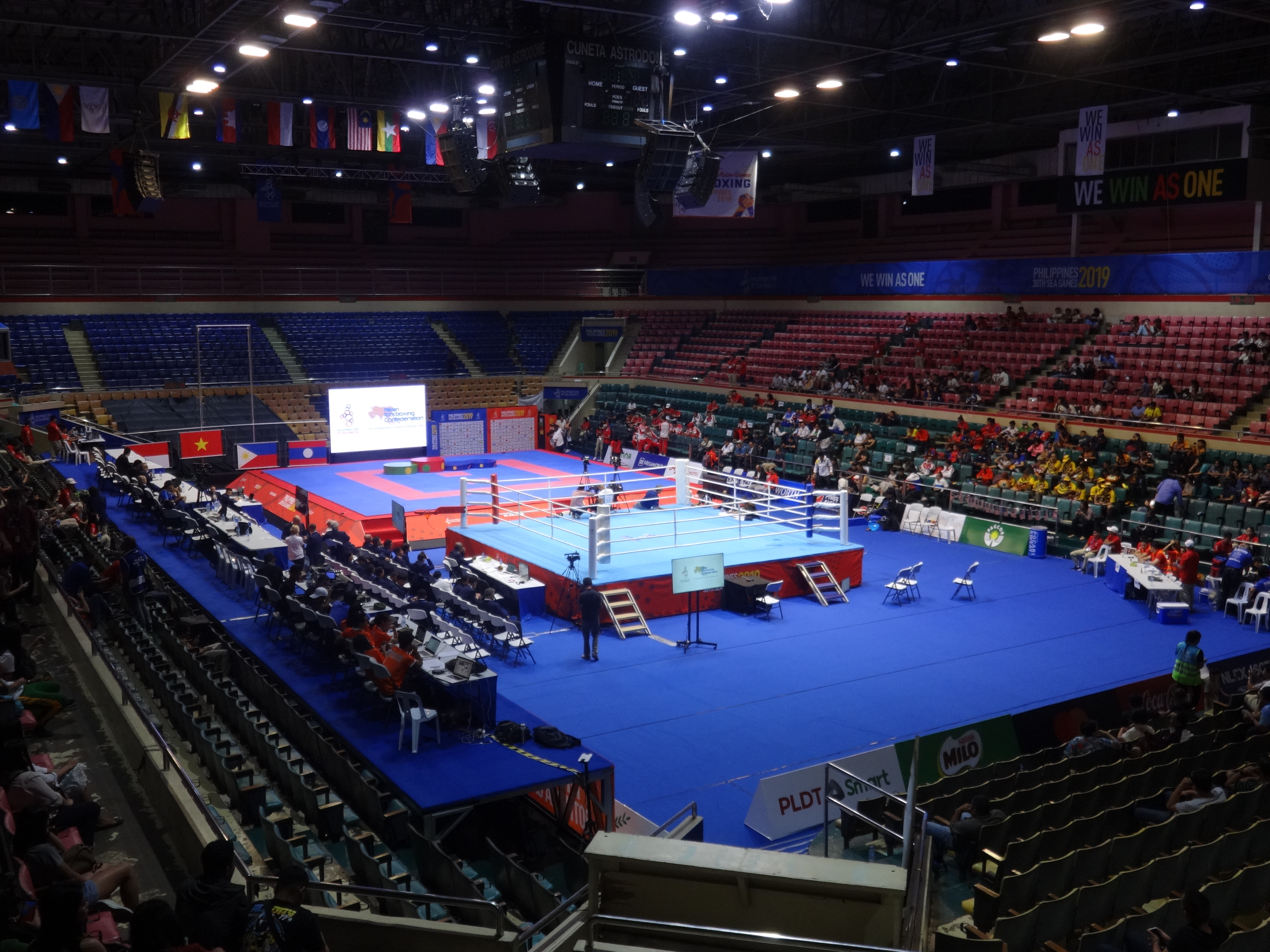
Cuneta Astrodome used as a venue for kickboxing events of the 2019 Southeast Asian Games.

Sharon Cuneta, the daughter of former Pasay mayor Pablo Cuneta, held the first concert at the Astrodome in January 1993, one month before the PBA held its opening ceremonies.

Since 1993, the coliseum has held 16 professional boxing programs, most notably Rolando Pascua's win over Dodie Boy Peñalosa and its undercard.

Outside of sports, it also hosted several evangelical and political gatherings, the most recent by a political campaign for actor and presidential candidate, Fernando Poe Jr., in 2004 and other functions by the opposition party.

It is also a usual gathering for evangelical events. Some religious organizations who have hosted the event are the Jesus is our Shield Worldwide Ministries of Apostle Renato D. Carillo, Doulos for Christ World Harvest, Jesus Miracle Crusade, Eli Soriano's Ang Dating Daan and the frequent user of the astrodome is the JESUS CHRIST To God Be The Glory Church International who held their services every Sunday and some major event such as concert, anniversary among others. The Intercessors For the Philippines (IFP) also organizes meetings there.

The biggest event hosted by far was in 1994, when the World Wrestling Federation (now World Wrestling Entertainment) held a live event at the said venue featuring a WWE World Championship match between the then-champion Bret Hart and his brother, challenger Owen Hart.

The Cranberries also held their "To the Faithful Departed" tour in the Cuneta Astrodome in 1996.

On July 19, 1997, Rage Against the Machine performed live at Cuneta Astrodome as part of their Evil Empire Tour Asian leg. All proceeds after the Concert were given for the benefit of the Pasay General Hospital. Taekwondo competitions of the 2005 Southeast Asian Games were hosted in the venue.

Tau Gamma Phi also held its 39th and 42nd Founding Anniversary on October 4, 2007, and October 4, 2010, respectively.

The grand finals of Talentadong Pinoy was also held here on March 6, 2010. and on August 18, 2013.

From December 7 to 10, 2019, Cuneta Astrodome hosted the kickboxing events of the 2019 Southeast Asian Games.

SB19's Manila concert dubbed as Get in the Zone: Manila was held on December 28, 2019.

The Cuneta Astrodome was used as a vaccination site during the COVID-19 pandemic. A fire broke out at the venue on November 10, 2021, when medical workers were preparing for the inoculation drive for that day.

On September 19, 2025, it was announced that the venue will host the playoffs for the 16th season of MPL Philippines, the country's Mobile Legends: Bang Bang league, in October.

== Renovation ==
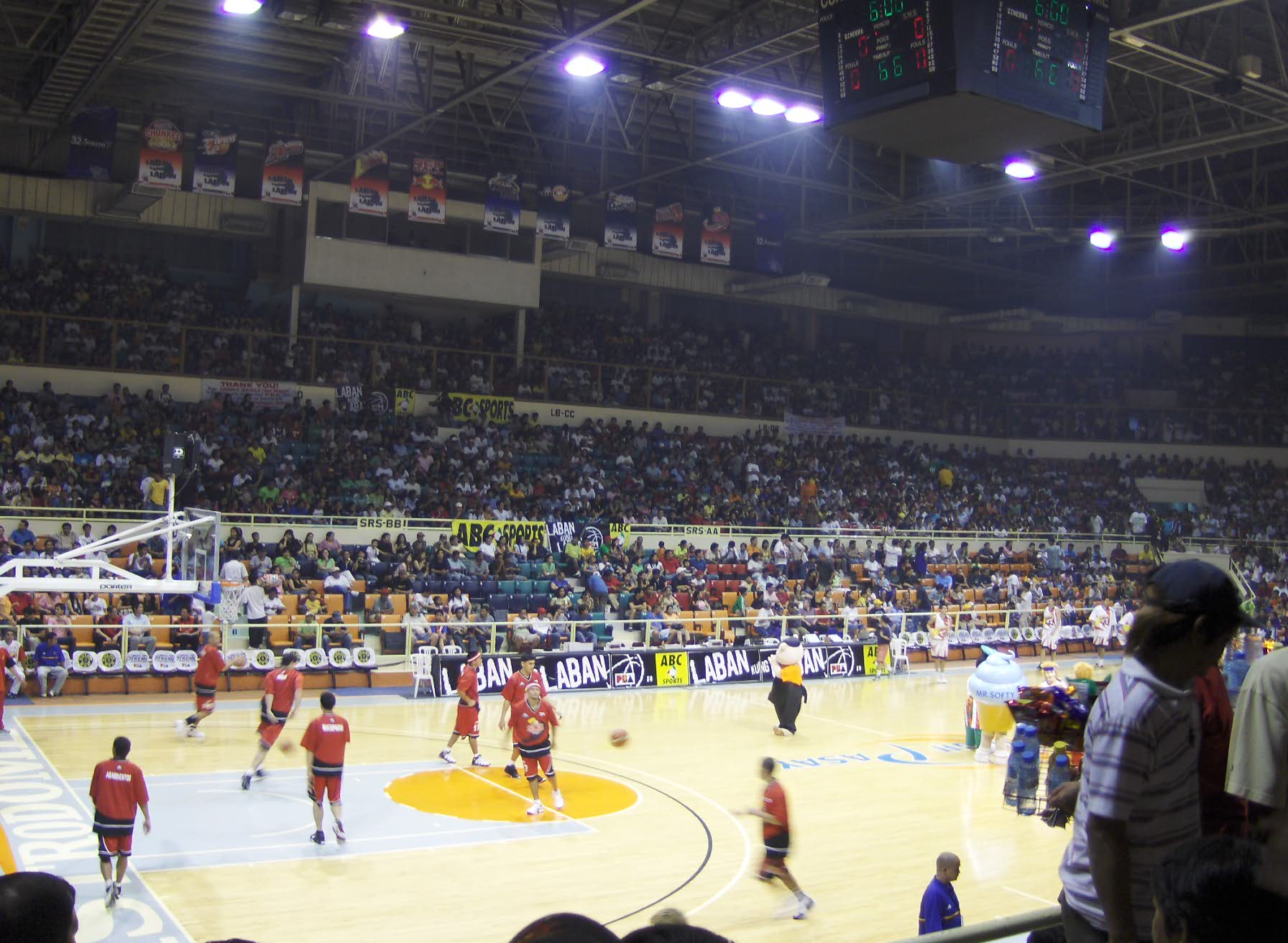
The Cuneta Astrodome during a PBA game in 2008

In 2006, the Astrodome was refurbished with new seats and a new flooring was installed for the basketball games as the venue had shown tremendous signs of deterioration over the past few years. It was the biggest renovation that occurred at the Astrodome, as past events resulted in minor refurbishment of the arena.

The renewed Astrodome debuted on June 30, 2006, during game six of the 2006 PBA Philippine Cup semifinal series as well as the Philippines-Lebanon goodwill series that happened in August that same year.

== See also ==
- List of venues played by the Philippine Basketball Association

Events and tenants
Preceded by first venue	Home of the Pasay Voyagers; 2018–2020, 2023–present	Succeeded by current
Preceded by PSC–NASA	Host of the PBA All-Star Game; 1993–1998	Succeeded by PhilSports Arena
