= Hendra Purnama =

Indonesian archer (born 1997)

Personal information
- Full name: Hendra Purnama
- Born: 12 January 1997 (age 29) Bantul, Indonesia
- Height: 1.69 m (5 ft 7 in)
- Weight: 64 kg (141 lb)

Sport
- Country: Indonesia
- Sport: Archery
- Event: Recurve
Medal record
Men's archery
Representing Indonesia
Southeast Asian Games
Gold medal – first place	2019 Philippines	Men's team
Gold medal – first place	2019 Philippines	Men's individual
Silver medal – second place	2015 Singapore	Men's team
- Updated on 9 December 2019

Hendra Purnama (born 12 January 1997) is an Indonesian competitive archer. He competed as a member of the Indonesian archery squad in major international tournaments, spanning the World Championships, Asian Championships, 2014 Summer Youth Olympics, and the 2016 Summer Olympics.

Purnama was selected to compete for Indonesia at the 2016 Summer Olympics in Rio de Janeiro, shooting in both individual and team recurve tournaments. First, Purnama amassed a total of 655 points out of a maximum 720 to hand him a thirty-ninth seed heading to the knockout stage, along with his team's score of 1,962 collected from the classification round. Sitting at tenth in the men's team recurve, Purnama and his compatriots Riau Ega Agatha and Muhammad Wijaya put up a more tremendous effort by trouncing Chinese Taipei in the opening round, before they faced their quarterfinal match against the Americans, which led to the trio's early departure from the competition at 2–6. In the men's individual recurve, Purnama succumbed to the two-time medalist Viktor Ruban of Ukraine in the opening round match with a score of 3–7.

== Individual performance timeline ==
Tournament	2015	2016	2017	SR
World Archery tournaments
Olympic Games		1R		0/1
World Championships	QR			0/1
World Cup				
Stage 1	4R	1R	1R	0/3
Stage 2				0/0
Stage 3		3R		0/1
Stage 4				0/0
World Cup Final	DNQ	DNQ		0/0
End of year world ranking	143	69		
