= Myanmar at the 2019 SEA Games =

Myanmar at the 2019 Southeast Asian Games
- IOC code: MYA
- NOC: Myanmar Olympic Committee

in the Philippines
- Competitors: 952 in 31 sports
- Medals Ranked 73rd: Gold 4 Silver 18 Bronze 51 Total 73

Southeast Asian Games appearances (overview)
- 1959; 1961; 1965; 1967; 1969; 1971; 1973; 1975; 1977; 1979; 1981; 1983; 1985; 1987; 1989; 1991; 1993; 1995; 1997; 1999; 2001; 2003; 2005; 2007; 2009; 2011; 2013; 2015; 2017; 2019; 2021; 2023; 2025; 2027; 2029

Myanmar is scheduled to compete at the 2019 Southeast Asian Games in the Philippines from 30 November to 11 December 2019. Athletes from Myanmar compete in 31 out 56 sports.

== Medal summary ==
=== Medal by sport ===
Medals by sport
Sport	1st place, gold medalist(s)	2nd place, silver medalist(s)	3rd place, bronze medalist(s)	Total
Archery	0	3	2	5
Arnis	1	4	15	20
Athletics	0	1	2	3
Billiards and snooker	2	1	3	6
Boxing	0	1	2	3
Canoeing	0	2	0	2
Chess	0	0	1	1
Football	0	0	2	2
Indoor Hockey	0	0	1	1
Judo	0	2	3	5
Karate	0	0	1	1
Kurash	0	0	1	1
Pétanque	0	0	1	1
Rowing	0	0	2	2
Sailing	0	0	1	1
Sepak Takraw	0	1	2	3
Taekwondo	0	0	4	4
Traditional Boat Race	1	1	2	4
Weightlifting	0	1	0	1
Wrestling	0	0	3	3
Wushu	0	1	3	4
Total	4	18	51	73

=== Medal by date ===
Medals by date
Day	Date	1st place, gold medalist(s)	2nd place, silver medalist(s)	3rd place, bronze medalist(s)	Total
1	1 December	0	2	8	10
2	2 December	0	4	8	12
3	3 December	1	0	4	5
4	4 December	0	0	1	1
5	5 December	1	2	4	7
6	6 December	0	2	2	4
7	7 December	1	1	7	9
8	8 December	0	5	6	11
9	9 December	0	2	11	13
10	10 December	1	0	0	1
11	11 December	0	0	0	0
Total		4	18	51	73

=== Medalists ===
No.	Medal	Name	Sport	Date
1	Gold	Eian Dray Phoo	Arnis – traditional open weapon	3 December
2	Gold	Phone Myint Kyaw and Aung Moe Thu	Men's billiards 9-ball pool doubles	5 December
3	Gold	Saw Myat Thu, Aye Aye Thein, Win Win Htwe, Hla Hla Htwe, Thet Phyoe Naing, Thida Oo	Traditional boat racing W4 seater 200m	7 December
4	Gold	Phone Myint Kyaw and Aung Moe Thu	Men's billiards 9-ball pool doubles	10 December
5	Silver	Soe Paing	Arnis – Men's 55kg	1 December
6	Silver	Thet Wai Oo	Arnis – women's 60-65 kg	1 December
7	Silver	Maw Maw Oo	Arnis – women's 50-55 kg	2 December
8	Silver	Moe Moe Aye	Arnis – women's 55-60 kg	2 December
9	Silver	Pyae Pyae Phyoe	Weightlifting women's 49kg	2 December
10	Silver	Su Hlaing Win	Wushu women's sanda events 65kg	2 December
11	Silver	Aung Pyae Tun, Aung Myo Naing, Aung Naing Oo, Htet Myat Thu, Zaw Myo Thu, Zin Min Oo, Zin Ko Ko, Hein Latt, Sithu Aung	Sepak takraw Men's doubles team	5 December
12	Silver	Khin Khin Su	Judo – women's 52 kg	5 December
13	Silver	Aye Aye Aung	Judo – women's 78 kg	6 December
14	Silver	Sai Min Wai, Aung Phyoe Wai	Men's Canoe Doubles 1000m	6 December
15	Silver	Myo Hlaing Win	MC1 200m	7 December
16	Silver	Thida Nwe, Pyae Sone Hnin, Yamin Thu	Archery women's team recurve	8 December
17	Silver	Pyae Sone Hnin	Archery women's ind recurve	8 December
18	Silver	Zaw Moe Aung, Saw Moe Aung, Min Min Zaw, Tun Tun Lin, Kyaw Saw Aye, Htet Wai Lwin	Traditional boat racing M4 seater 500m	8 December
19	Silver	Htike Lin Oo	Archery men's ind recurve	8 December
20	Silver	Khin Khin Su	Athletics Women 10km race walk	8 December
21	Silver	Nay Thway Oo	Men English silliards	9 December
22	Silver	Nwe Ni Oo	Boxing featherweight 57kg	9 December
23	Bronze	Win Thet Paing	Arnis – men's 55-65 kg	1 December
24	Bronze	Thet Naing Oo	Arnis – men's 60-65 kg	1 December
25	Bronze	Van Lian Khawl	Arnis – men's 65-70 kg	1 December
26	Bronze	Thandar Khing	Arnis – women's 55 kg	1 December
27	Bronze	Hla Nwe Aye	Arnis – women's 55-60 kg	1 December
28	Bronze	Moe Moe Aye	Arnis – women's 55-60 kg	1 December
29	Bronze	Myint Zin	Kurash – men's +90 kg	1 December
30	Bronze	Kyu Kyu Than, Phyu Phyu Than, Mar Mar Win, Su Tin Zar Naing, Naing Naing Win, May Zin Phyoe	Hoop takraw Women's	1 December
31	Bronze	Nay Lin Oo	Arnis – men's 55 kg	2 December
32	Bronze	Tin Ko	Arnis – men's 55-60 kg	2 December
33	Bronze	Aung Khaing Lin	Arnis – men's 60-65 kg	2 December
34	Bronze	Kyaw Thurain Tun	Arnis – men's 65 kg	2 December
35	Bronze	Wuttyi Cho	Arnis – women's 50 kg	2 December
36	Bronze	L Sheilar Min Naing	Arnis – women's 60 kg	2 December
37	Bronze	Aung Myo Tun	Wushu – men's 48 kg	2 December
38	Bronze	Chit Ko Ko	Wushu – men's 65 kg	2 December
39	Bronze	Yar Zar Tun	Arnis – non-traditional (Men)	3 December
40	Bronze	L Sheilar Min Naing	Non-traditional open weapon	3 December
41	Bronze	Be Be Kyaw Aung	Men's traditional	3 December
42	Bronze	Thein Than Oo	Wushu – men's nanquan	3 December
43	Bronze	Mai San, Chit Min Min Ko	Judo – kata	4 December
44	Bronze	Chue Myat Noe Wai	Judo – women's 63kg	5 December
45	Bronze	Aung Zayar Tun	Judo – men's 66kg	5 December
46	Bronze	Khin Cherry Thet, Tin Tin Wai, Aye Aye Nyein, Yin Yin Win Shein	Pétanque triple women	5 December
47	Bronze	Ko Htet, Thet Min Lin	Snooker doubles men's	5 December
48	Bronze	Thandar Aung	10 ball pools single	6 December
49	Bronze	Ame Aung	10 ball pools single	6 December
50	Bronze	Nilar Win, Shwe Zin Latt, Ei Phyu	Rowing-LW2X 1000m	7 December
51	Bronze	Yair Htet Aung	Athletics – men's 200m	7 December
52	Bronze	Win Zaw Tun	Chess – ind ASEAN chess	7 December
53	Bronze	May Myat Noe Khin	Sailing – Potimist (U-16)	7 December
54	Bronze	Sunshine	Taekwondo – poolmsae men's	7 December
55	Bronze	Phone Thet Naing	Taekwondo – poolmsae men's free style	7 December
56	Bronze	Tun Tun Lin, Saw Moe Aung, Khaw Zaw Aye, Sithu Eain, Than Htay Aung, Aung Paing Htet, Min Min Zaw, Htet Wai Lwin, Sai Min Aung, Sai Phyoe Kyaw, Zaw Moe Aung, Nay Htet Lin, Zaw Min, Khin Su Su Aung	Traditional Boat- M12 seater 200m	7 December
57	Bronze	Thida Nwe	Archery women's ind recurve	8 December
58	Bronze	Mya Phoo Ngone, May Zin Nwe, Ei Yadanar Phyoe, Khin Than Wai, Aye Aye Moe, Chit Chit, Khine Thazin, Khin Marlar Tun, Nge Nge Htwe, Khin Moe Wai, Khin Moe Moe Tun, Nu Nu, Thin Thin Yu, Ye Ye Oo, Win Theingi Oo, July Kyaw, Phyu Phyu Win, Myat Noe Khin, San Thaw Thaw	Football Women's	8 December
59	Bronze	Shwe Zin Lat, Nilar Win	Rowing – W2 pair	8 December
60	Bronze	Htoo Aung Kyaw, Thant Sin Tun, Ko Ko Lwin, Aung Pyae Tun, Aung Myo Naing, Aung Naing Oo, Htet Myat Thu, Zaw Myo Thu, Zin Min Oo, Zin Ko Ko, Hein Latt, Sithu Aung	Sepak takraw – team regu	8 December
61	Bronze	Kyaw Min Naing	Taekwondo -80kg men's	8 December
62	Bronze	Saw Moe Aung, Kyaw Saw Aye, Sithu Eain, Than Htay Aung, Aung Paing Htet, Tun Tun Lin, Thet Phyoe Naing, Aye Aye Thein, Hla Hla Htwe, Lin Lin Kyaw, Min Min Zaw, Htet Wai Lwin, Sai Min Aung, Sai Phyoe Kyaw, Zaw Moe Aung, Nay Htet Lin, Saw Myat Thu, Su Wai Phyoe, Win Win Htwe, Thida Oo, Naing Lin Oo, Zin Ko Htet, Myint Myint Soe, Soe Sanda, Khin Su Su Aung, Zaw Min	Traditional Boat-Mixed 22 1000m	8 December
63	Bronze	Su Su Hlaing	Archery – ind women compound	9 December
64	Bronze	Mai Nyi Nyi Moe	Athletics – men's 200km race walk	9 December
65	Bronze	Aye Nyein Htoo	Boxing -48kg	9 December
66	Bronze	Naing Latt	Boxing 56kg	9 December
67	Bronze	Soe Arkar, San Satt Naing, Yair Lin Tun, Ye Yint Aung, Thurain Soe, Soe Moe Kyaw, Aung Wunna Soe, Nay Moe Naing, Aung Naing Win, Myat Kaung Khant, Zin Min Tun, Soe Lwin Lwin, Kaung Htet Soe, Win Naing Tun, Aung Kaung Marn, Htet Phyoe Wai, Win Moe Kyaw, Lwin Moe Aung, Hlaing Bo Bo, Aung Thu	Football – men's	9 December
68	Bronze	Than Htut Win, Thein Htike Oo, Sitt Nyein Aye, Aung Myo Thu, Kyaw Ye Htut, Ko Wai, Ko Ko Linn, Nay Shein, Mg Hein, Thet Htwe, Thein Htike Aung, Sa Kaung Htet	Hockey – men's	9 December
69	Bronze	Nway Nway Zaw Win	Karate – +61 kumite	9 December
70	Bronze	Desy Oo Juliet	Taekwondo -43kg flyweight	9 December
71	Bronze	Kaythi Khaing	Wrestling – Greca Roman 50kg	9 December
72	Bronze	Myo Ko	Wrestling – Greca Roman 55kg	9 December
73	Bronze	Wunna Tun	Wrestling – Greca Roman 60kg	9 December

== Arnis ==
The athletes of Myanmar Thaing Federation prepared to compete in Arnis events of 30th SEA Games. The athletes left Yangon on 23 November with 23 officials and athletes. The team is led by the general secretary of the federation, Khin Lay Mon. The team is composed with 5 officials, 10 male athletes and 8 female athletes.

On 1.12.2019, the Arnis team took the first medal for Myanmar with 2 silver medals and 7 bronze medals. After the all events, the Arnis team took the most medals for Myanmat with 1 gold medal, 4 silver medals and 15 bronze medals.
