= 2019 SEA Games marketing =

The 2019 Southeast Asian Games marketing is a long-running campaign that began during the one-year countdown to the games held in Bayanihan Park in Angeles City, Philippines. on November 30, 2018.

== Symbols ==
=== Emblem ===
Official emblem of the 2019 Southeast Asian Games

A preview of the logo of the 2019 SEA Games was earlier presented in front of the Olympic Council of Asia on August 20, 2018 in Jakarta, Indonesia during the 2018 Asian Games. The official logo depicts 11 rings from the logo of the Southeast Asian Games Federation forming the shape the Philippines and colored with the red, blue, yellow and green. It was made official during the launching ceremony in Bayanihan Park.

=== Motto ===
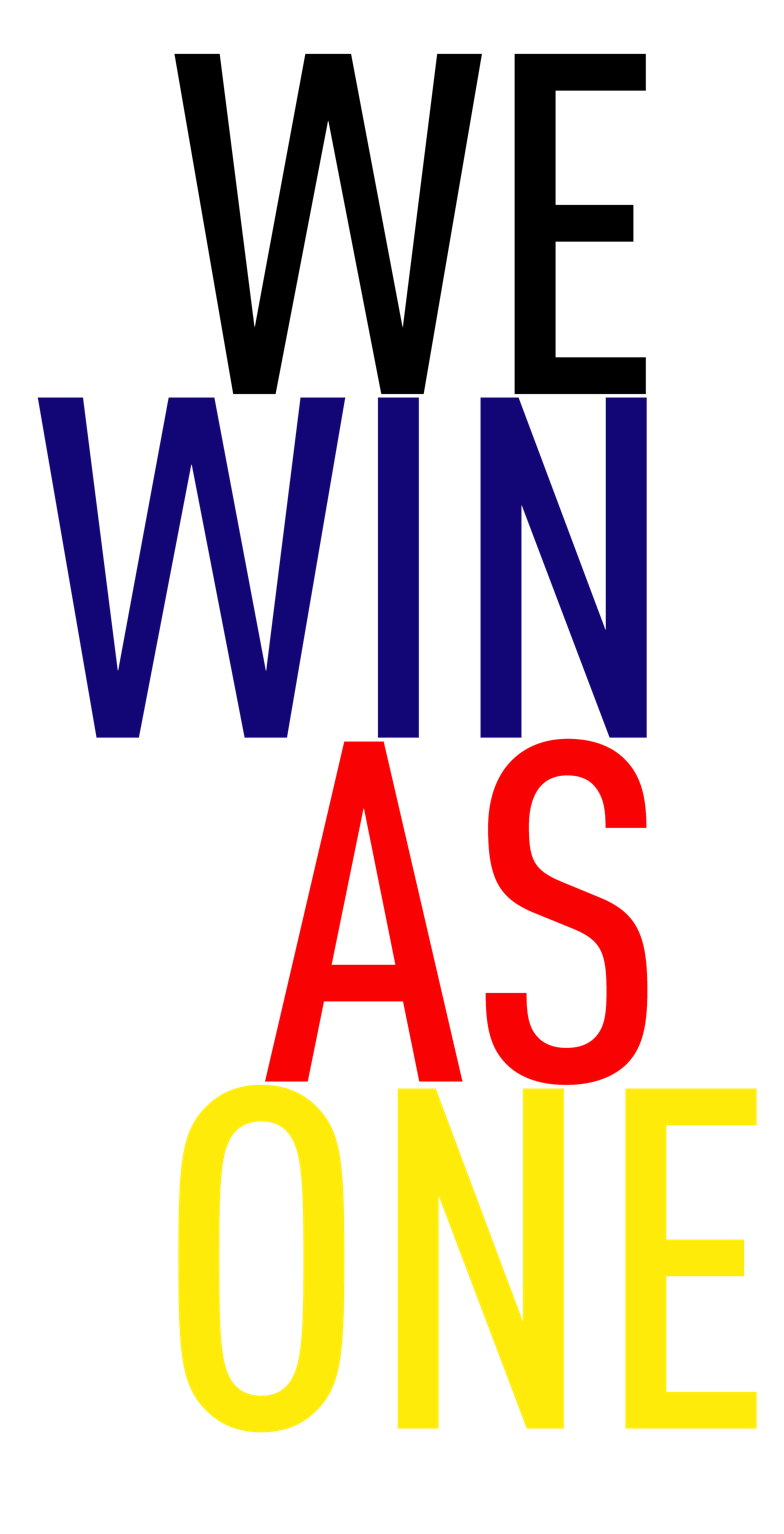
"We Win As One", the official motto of the 2019 games.

The official motto of the 2019 Southeast Asian Games, as well as its theme, is "We Win As One.

=== Mascot ===
The games' mascot is dubbed as Pami, with their name derived from the "pamilya", the Filipino word for "family". According to 2019 SEA Games executive director Ramon Suzara, the mascot represents every nation, every athlete, every person coming together that support each other at the games. The mascot with a joyful character has been described to have been made from squishy spherical balls. Just like the logo and theme, it was also previewed during the meeting in Jakarta, Indonesia. It was made official during the countdown ceremony in Bayanihan Park.

== Theme song ==
Ryan Cayabyab composed the official theme song of the 2019 Southeast Asian Games, which shares the name of the games' official slogan "We Win As One". Floy Quintos wrote the lyrics for the song, which was officially launched on July 11, 2019. Lea Salonga performed for the official release of theme song. The theme song and music video for "We Win As One" was formally released on 3 September 2019 at the Resorts World Manila. The music video which was shot at the New Clark City Sports Hub was directed by Shem Hampac and was produced by Equinox Manila.

Cayabyab originally made the composition of the song, with the expectation that 11 singers will do the official performance. The song was revised, in order to be more suitable for a solo performance, after Lea Salonga was tapped to do the performance. Cayabyab and Jimmy Antiporda were the ones responsible for the arrangement of the song.

== Sponsorship ==
There are at least three tiers of sponsorship for the 2019 Southeast Asian Games, depending on the amount of funds a company contributes to the games; Preferred sponsors contributed ₱500,000, Gold sponsors contributed ₱2,000,000 and Platinum sponsors contributed ₱3,000,000. Philippine Airlines will provide the air transport for the delegates of the games. Singapore-based Razer Inc. will be involved in the organization of the Esports events.

Currently, there are at least 50 sponsors: ten sponsors for Platinum, seven sponsors for Gold, six sponsors for Preferred partners, five sponsors as prestige partners, one sponsor for insurance partner, one sponsor for commemorative watch, two sponsors for banking partners, one sponsor for convenience store, seven sponsors for media partners, one sponsor for host broadcaster, and nine sponsors for broadcasters; while Bronze is still not yet announced.

Six companies have sealed their partnership agreements with PHISGOC during the sponsorship signing ceremonies on February 13, 2019. Atos, an international company which is also the IT Partner of the Olympic and Paralympic Games, is designated as the official games management system provider. France-based GL Events will provide the overlays and temporary structures of the 39 sporting venues to be used for the 2019 SEA Games. Grand Sport, a sports apparel company from Thailand, is the official provider of the uniforms for the workforce, volunteers and technical officials. The official kits of the national athletes of the host country will be provided by Asics. Mikasa, Marathon, and Molten are the providers of the official game balls and sporting equipment of the games, all brought in by Sonak Corporation. PHISGOC appointed MediaPro Asia as the official exclusive production, media rights, marketing and sponsorship agent of the games.

Autonomous vehicle (AV) service from United States-based COAST Autonomous will be used to serve athletes and officials between the athletes’ village, aquatic center and athletics stadium in New Clark City. This will be the first ever implementation of an AV service in a major sporting event.

SM Lifestyle, Inc., an arm of SM Prime Holdings, was named the regional games' official venue partner with the venue for men's basketball and ice hockey to be held in facilities managed by the SM Group.

Skyworth was named as the official television partner in the games. They will also cover events prior to the competition proper including the torch relays in the Philippines and Malaysia, as well as the Game Hub and Fan Zones. The platinum-tier sponsorship was helped secured by Singapore firm Mediapro Asia.

Mastercard is the main sponsor of the games' official mobile app which would allow users to view the schedule and results as well purchase tickets and food in the venue.

The organizers secured insurance for the games' athletes and officials from Standard Insurance Co. Inc. which covered a period of October 15 to December 15, 2019 with each beneficiary having a coverage of ₱300 thousand. The insurance plan covers death or any accident related injuries incurred both during the games and in training, and losses due to sabotage and terrorist acts. Standard Insurance has EMA-Global as its medical service provider partner.

Sponsors of the 2019 Southeast Asian Games
Platinum Partners
- Ajinomoto
- PAGCOR
- Skyworth, CooCaa
- Philippine Airlines
- PINACO
- Morris Garages
- Phoenix Petroleum
- Megaworld Corporation
- Resorts World Manila
Gold Partners
- Pocari Sweat
- Nestlé (Milo)
- Mastercard
- NLEX-SCTEX
- Razer
- Coca-Cola
- PLDT-Smart
Preferred Partners
- ASICS
- GL Events
- Grand Sport
- BMW Philippines
- SM Lifestyle, Inc.
- FBT
Prestige Partners
- Molten Corporation
- Mikasa Sports
- Marathon
- Filinvest City
- GSIS
Official Banking Partners
- Chinabank
- Philippine National Bank
Official Convenience Store
- FamilyMart
Official Commemorative Watch
- Ibara Manila
Official Insurance Partner
- Standard Insurance
Official Media Partners
- Inquirer Group of Companies
- CNN Philippines
- Digital Out of Home (DOOH), United Neon Media Group
- Bombo Radyo Philippines
- Radio Mindanao Network
- Rakuten Viber
Official Host Broadcaster
- NEP
Official Broadcasters
- ABS-CBN
- TV5 Network
- One Sports
- Cignal
- SkyCable
- S+A
- ESPN 5
- PTV
- GMA Network
