= 2019 SEA Games =

Multi-sport event in the Philippines

2019 Southeast Asian Games
- Host city: Philippines (Note: Games are decentralized, and events took place in various cities (see § Venues)
- Motto: "We Win as One"
- Nations: 11
- Athletes: 5,630
- Events: 530 in 56 sports (63 disciplines)
- Opening: 30 November 2019
- Closing: 11 December 2019
- Opened by: Rodrigo Duterte; President of the Philippines
- Closed by: Salvador Medialdea; Executive Secretary of the Philippines
- Athlete's Oath: Francesca Altomonte
- Judge's Oath: Daren Vitug
- Torch lighter: Manny Pacquiao; Nesthy Petecio
- Main venue: Philippine Arena (opening ceremony); New Clark City Athletics Stadium (closing ceremony)
- Website: SEA Games PH 2019 at the Wayback Machine (archived December 31, 2019)

The 2019 Southeast Asian Games, officially known as the 30th Southeast Asian Games, or the 30th SEA Games, and commonly known as Philippines 2019, were the 30th edition of the Southeast Asian Games, a biennial regional multi-sport event which was held in the Philippines from 30 November to 11 December 2019. However, due to a narrow calendar, some sports started before the opening ceremony as early as 24 November.

This edition was marked by the first major decentralization in the history of the Games, with competition venues spread in 23 cities across the country and divided into four clusters; all were located on the island of Luzon (Metro Manila, Clark, Subic/Olongapo, and a fourth cluster consisting of standalone venues in Cavite, Laguna, and La Union). This was the country's fourth time to host the games, and its first since 2005. Previously, it had also hosted the 1981 and 1991 editions of the games. This edition was most notable for being the first edition to include esports, obstacle course race, kurash, sambo, underwater hockey, breaking, surfing, modern pentathlon, jiu-jitsu, kickboxing, and skateboarding; as well as having the highest number of sports in the history of the Games, at a total of 56.

The hosting rights were originally awarded to Brunei in 2012, but the country pulled out days before the 2015 SEA Games due to "financial and logistical reasons."

The Philippines was previously slated to host the 2023 SEA Games but, in July 2015, it agreed to host the Games after Brunei's withdrawal (with Cambodia taking its place). However, the Philippines' hosting was left uncertain following the withdrawal of government support two years later as it planned to use the funds intended for the games for the rehabilitation of Marawi after being occupied by ISIS supporters. Thailand and Indonesia offered to host the Games with the latter planning to reuse the venues used for the 2018 Asian Games. However, by August 16, 2017, the Philippine government reversed its withdrawal.

The host country, Philippines, emerged in the medal tally as the overall champion for the first time in 14 years, breaking its own medal count record in 2005, followed by Vietnam and Thailand. Several games and national records were broken during the games. Amidst numerous controversies and problems, the games were deemed generally successful with the rising standard of competition amongst the Southeast Asian nations, with its hosting being lauded by the Olympic Council of Asia for its facilities and hospitality. The Philippines planned to bid for the hosting rights for the 2030 Asian Games but was unable to submit the bid by the deadline.

Quah Zheng Wen of Singapore was awarded the Most Valuable Player (MVP) award for male athletes, having won six golds and two silvers, while Nguyễn Thị Ánh Viên of Vietnam, with the same medal tally, was accorded MVP honors for female athletes. The fairplay award was awarded to Roger Casugay for saving a fellow competitor's life.

== Host selection ==
As per SEA Games traditions, hosting duties are rotated among the SEA Games Federation (SEAGF) member countries. Each country is assigned to host the event in a predetermined year, but the country can choose to withdraw or not host that edition.

In July 2012, the SEAGF meeting in Myanmar confirmed that Malaysia would host the regional biennial event in 2017, should there be no other country willing to bid. Olympic Council of Malaysia (OCM) secretary general Sieh Kok Chi, who attended the meeting, said that Myanmar would host the Games in 2013, followed by Singapore in 2015 and Brunei in 2017. However, the sultanate gave up hosting the Games in 2017, in exchange for having more time to organize the 2019 edition. Brunei hosted the Games only once in 1999 and planned to upgrade its sports facilities and build a new national stadium in Salambigar. However, on June 4, 2015, Brunei withdrew its hosting rights at the meeting in Singapore after the said country's Ministry of Culture, Youth and Sports had failed to give support for the Games due to the lack of sporting facilities, accommodation, and preparation of their athletes.

=== Philippines ===
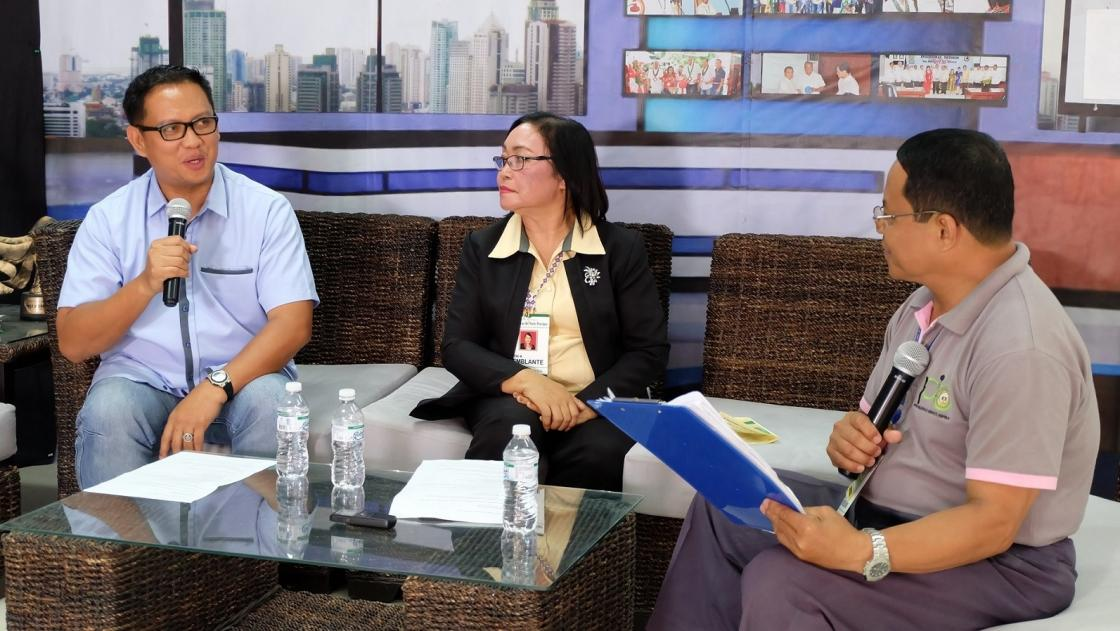
Provincial Sports Coordinator and Assistant Provincial Administrator Giovanni Gulanes reveals Davao del Norte's bid to host the 2019 Southeast Asian Games at the Kapihan sa Kapitolyo. July 2016.

With Brunei's withdrawal, the Philippines expressed its interest to host the Games. Vietnam, the 2021 Southeast Asian Games host, was also offered to host this edition, but declined. On July 10, 2015, the Philippine Olympic Committee (POC) announced that the Philippines will be hosting the Games. Davao City and Manila were touted as the top candidates for the main host city of the Games. Cebu City and Albay also expressed interest in hosting some events.

On July 21, 2017, The Philippine Sports Commission (PSC) addressed the POC that it is withdrawing its support for the Philippine hosting of the 2019 Games, saying that government decided to reallocate funds meant for hosting to the rehabilitation efforts of Marawi, which was left devastated following the Battle of Marawi and it was later reported that the POC's insistence on handling all matters of the hosting; finance, security and the conduct of the Games as it did for the 2005 SEA Games led to the PSC's withdrawal of support.

However, in August 2017, the Philippines, through the then-POC president Peping Cojuangco, confirmed that the country would pursue hosting the 2019 SEA Games, after Cojuangco wrote to then-President Rodrigo Duterte and appealed for reconsideration.

Cojuangco has stated that the Games would be mainly held in the Central Luzon area, particularly in the provinces of Bulacan, Pampanga, and Zambales. He added that the Philippine Arena in the municipality of Bocaue in Bulacan province would "most likely" be used in the Games. In January 2018, during the groundbreaking of the New Clark City Sports Hub (then known as the Philippine Sports City), it was announced that the organizers will attempt to hold all events of the games outside of Manila with New Clark City in Capas, Tarlac, Subic, and Bulacan as main host localities.

=== Handover ceremony ===
During the closing ceremony of the 2017 SEA Games in Kuala Lumpur, the symbolic SEA Games Federation council flag was handed over by outgoing Malaysian Olympic Committee president HRH Tunku Tan Sri Imran to then-Philippine Olympic Committee (POC) president Jose "Peping" Cojuangco, who in turn passed the flag to then-Foreign Affairs Secretary Alan Peter Cayetano, who will be the Chairman of organizing committee for 2019 games.

In contrast of other closing ceremonies held throughout the SEA Games, only a discrete video promoting tourism in the Philippines was presented instead of a grand presentation for the next host country. One of the reasons given by the Philippine Olympic Committee is the cost of holding a handover ceremony, at ₱8 billion. Another reason is to give focus on the celebration of the 60th anniversary of the establishment of the Malaysian federation.

== Development and preparations ==
Unlike the 2005 Games, the 2019 SEA Games adopted a different organizing structure for the Philippine Southeast Asian Games Organizing Committee (PHISGOC). According to Philippine Sports Commission chairman William Ramirez, Foreign Affairs Secretary (later House Speaker) Alan Peter Cayetano would be appointed as the organizing committee chairman, instead of the Philippine Olympic Committee president who presumed the role in 2005. Senator Migz Zubiri was initially the head of the organizing committee before being replaced by Cayetano.

At least three meetings were held for the preparation of the Games. The first meeting was held in Shangri-la Hotel at the Fort on May 16 and 17, 2018. Another meeting was held on November 23 and 24, 2018.

Officials of National Sports Associations of the Philippines were designated as competition managers and were tasked to deal with local arrangements concerning their sport including logistics, venues and equipment.

=== Aeta communities ===
Phase one of New Clark City, where the Philippine government built a sports complex worth ₱9.5 billion for the SEA Games, covers 9,450 hectares of land and displaced more than 27,500 Aetas. Some families were given a week to vacate their homes in 2019 before the start of the SEA Games. In 2019, the BCDA, citing the absence of a Certificate of Ancestral Domain Title, ordered the eviction of over 500 Aeta families for the expansion of New Clark City. The BCDA offered Aeta families $0.51 (₱30) per square meters as financial compensation for their eviction. The Asosyason ng Katutubong Mahawang in Capas said that the Aeta people have resided in the ancestral domain even before the Spanish colonization of the Philippines. In December 2019, Senator Risa Hontiveros filed a Senate resolution to investigate the eviction, stating "There is a need to ensure the protection of Aetas and other indigenous communities from unjust expulsion from a land that has served as their home and have tilled since time immemorial".

=== Costs ===
The budget for the games is at least ₱7.5 billion (US$147 million as of July 31, 2019). ₱6 billion (US$118 million) were provided by the government, while the rest were secured by PHISGOC from sponsorships. The government funds were allocated to the Philippine Sports Commission with ₱5 billion(US$98 million) from the funds approved by the Philippine Congress and the remainder derived from augmentation fund approved by then-President Rodrigo Duterte. Duterte approved the additional funds by May 2019.

=== Ticketing ===
The organizers entered negotiations with SM Tickets for ticketing systems. All tickets for all events were originally planned to cost a fee, with sports determined to be less popular by the organizers, to have a minimal fee. On October 3, 2019, tickets for the opening ceremony and select events were made on available on all SM Tickets branches and online. However, in a few days leading to the opening ceremony, there were clamors to make the tickets free to the general public. Public figures and groups, such as the Samahang Weightlifting ng Pilipinas President Monico Puentevella and the Associated Labor Unions-Trade Union Congress of the Philippines appealed to then-President Rodrigo Duterte to make the tickets free. Presidential spokesperson Salvador Panelo suggested the organizers to give the tickets free or charge tickets at a discounted price for students.

On November 29, 2019, upon instructions of then-President Duterte, tickets were made available for free for all sporting events, except basketball, football and volleyball, which were sold out. Tickets were also made available for free for the closing ceremony, with organizers giving 10,000 tickets to SM Tickets for distribution and thousands of other tickets to local government units.

=== Transportation ===
Organizers coordinated with the Department of Transportation regarding logistics for the Games including the possible closure of the North Luzon Expressway to the public for 12 hours before the opening ceremony.

362 public buses, 162 sedans and 100 VIP cars, were planned to be bought and 268 vans were to be rented for use. There were also three self-driving electric vehicles provided by American firm Connected Autonomous Shared Transportation (COAST) for transportation of passengers in New Clark City at no cost to the government.

=== Volunteers ===
The organizers of the Games launched a volunteer program in April 2019 in Taguig to aid the organization of the 2019 Southeast Asian Games with the target of volunteers initially set to 12,000. Around 9,000 individuals were recruited among those 20,686 people who expressed interest to join the volunteering program, 14,683 of which applied through official online portals. 2,960 applicants were foreigners while 6,003 were elected by educational institutions. There were approximately 2,250 volunteers in the Clark cluster, 1,980 in the Subic cluster, 3,150 in Metro Manila, and 1,620 in other venues not part of the first three clusters.

=== Medals ===
The official medals for the 2019 Southeast Asian Games were designed by Filipino metal sculptor Daniel dela Cruz, who also designed the SEA Games torch, incorporating elements inspired by the Philippines. On the medal's front, above the SEA Games logo is a sail or "layag" typically used by Filipino boats. Encircling the logo are sea waves signifying the Philippine archipelago. At the back is a rendering of the sports facilities at the New Clark City, site of the SEA Games, which was incorporated using high density etching. Symbols of the various sports are embedded using laser etching.

The gold medal is made of 24-karat gold plated material and its wave design in front is made of rhodium via bi-plating. The bronze medal was made "rose gold" in color instead of the traditional brown hue. The ribbon used to hold the medal features a double-sided design; one side features the colors associated with the Southeast Asian Games and the other is decorated with traditional Filipino weave patterns. They were accompanied by a wooden carrying box, while medalists also received flower bouquets, Pami and Philippine Airlines aircraft stuffed toys.

=== Torch ===
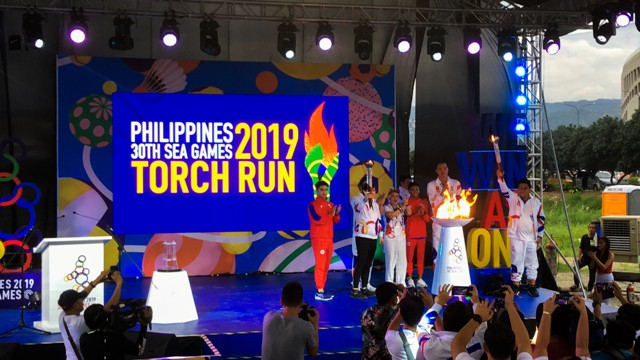
The Cebu leg of the torch run for the 2019 Southeast Asian Games, November 16, 2019.

2019 Southeast Asian Games torch run route.

October 30
1. Davao City

November 16
2. Cebu City

November 23
3. Angeles City

The design of the official torch for the games was designed by Filipino metal sculptor Daniel dela Cruz The torch was inspired from the sampaguita (Jasminum sambac) the Philippines' national flower and the hammered portions of the object represents the rays of the Philippine flag's sun. According to the organizers, the sun symbolizes "unity, sovereignty, social equality, and independence" aside from sharing the same symbolism of the sun of the Philippine flag. The torch weighs about 1.5 kilograms, not too heavy for the torch bearer. The torch was officially unveiled on August 23, 2019, at the Philippine International Convention Center in Pasay during the 100-day countdown to the games.

=== Torch relay ===
Preceding the torch run in the Philippines was the ceremonial lighting of the lantern at the Bukit Jalil National Stadium in Kuala Lumpur on October 3, 2019. During the ceremony, Malaysian authorities handed the torch to the Philippine authorities. During the ceremony, the flame was placed on a special lantern and was brought to Davao City to start the domestic part of the relay across the nation.

The Philippine part of the relay, started in front of SM Lanang in Davao City on October 30, 2019. The second leg of the run, participated by 6,500 runners was held at Cebu South Coastal Road in Cebu City on November 16, 2019. The final leg was held on November 23, 2019, at the Bayanihan Park in Clark Freeport Zone in Pampanga.

=== Cauldron ===
Cauldron

The cauldron is a metal structure that stands at 12.5 meters (41 ft), built outside the New Clark City Athletics Stadium in Capas, Tarlac and it was lit on November 30 by the boxers Manny Pacquiao and Nesthy Petecio during the opening ceremony. The inside is a hollow space filled with gravel, Inside the cauldron, there is an open space, which is filled with gravel, being supported by several metal structures on each side of the structure. According to the PHISGOC, estimated costs for the construction and maintenance of the cauldron are estimated in ₱47 million.

The cauldron was designed by National Artist for Architecture, Francisco Mañosa, which was his last project prior to his death.

==== Cost ====
The Philippine Southeast Asian Games Organizing Committee (PHISGOC) requested a budget of ₱55.92 million for the cauldron from the Philippine Sports Commission, which handled the ₱6 billion fund provided by the national government for the organization of the 2019 Southeast Asian Games. The breakdown of the budget for the cauldron is as follows:

- ₱4.4 million – design
- ₱13.44 million – foundation construction
- ₱32 million – construction and installation of the cauldron itself
- ₱6 million – wrist tags

In the days leading to the 2019 Southeast Asian Games, the construction of the cauldron was met with criticism due to its cost. Senator Franklin Drilon pejoratively called the cauldron a kaldero (lit. 'cooking cauldron, in Filipino') questioning the cost of the structure saying the money spent for it could have been used to build 50 classrooms. House Speaker Alan Peter Cayetano, who is also the chairman of the organizing committee of the games, defended the cauldron as "priceless work of art" and pointed out that the cauldron used in the 2015 Southeast Asian Games in Singapore was more expensive at ₱63 million. President Rodrigo Duterte expressed belief that there was no corruption involved in building the cauldron. The Office of the Ombudsman said it had created a fact-finding panel to probe the possibility of corruption.

In September 2021, Cayetano said that the cauldron was wholly funded by the private sector adding that corruption allegations regarding the cauldron caused some sponsors of the games to withdraw.

== Venues ==
Four main hubs or clusters of the 2019 Southeast Asian Games. The fourth cluster was designated as "Other Areas" which includes venues that are not part of either Manila, Subic, or Clark clusters.

There were four designated clusters or hubs for the sporting events of the 2019 Southeast Asian Games namely Clark, Subic, Metro Manila, and "Other Areas". Previously the fourth cluster was reportedly known as the BLT (Batangas, La Union, and Tagaytay) Cluster The main hub is Clark in the sports complex at the National Government Administrative Center, New Clark City in Capas, Tarlac. The secondary venue will be Subic while the tertiary venue will be Metro Manila and the other nearby areas. The Philippine Sports Commission confirmed that Manila would host boxing, basketball, and volleyball events while Subic would host water sport events.

The NOC (National Olympic Committee) mansions and villas for accommodating of the delegates from the competing countries were built in New Clark City. Each mansion would have 15 to 17 rooms each.

The opening ceremony was held at the Philippine Arena in Bulacan while the closing ceremony was held at the New Clark City Athletics Stadium.

=== Competition venues ===
==== Clark cluster ====
The Athletics Stadium of the New Clark City Sports Hub hosted athletics and the closing ceremony.

City/Municipality	Venue	Events	Capacity
Angeles City	AUF Gymnasium	Arnis, Sambo, Wrestling	
Angeles City	DECA Clark Wakepark	Wakeboarding, Waterskiing	
Mabalacat	Clark Parade Grounds	Archery, Rugby sevens	
Mabalacat	Clark Friendship Gate	Lawn Bowls	
Mabalacat	Royce Hotel and Casino	Dancesports, Petanque	
Mabalacat	The Villages Sports Complex	Baseball, Softball	
San Fernando	LausGroup Event Centre	Judo, Jujitsu, Kurash	
Capas	New Clark City Athletics Stadium	Athletics, opening ceremony (cauldron lighting), closing ceremony	20,000
Capas	New Clark City Aquatic Center	Aquatics (Diving, Swimming, Water Polo)	2,000
Tarlac City	Luisita Golf and Country Club	Golf	

==== Metro Manila cluster ====
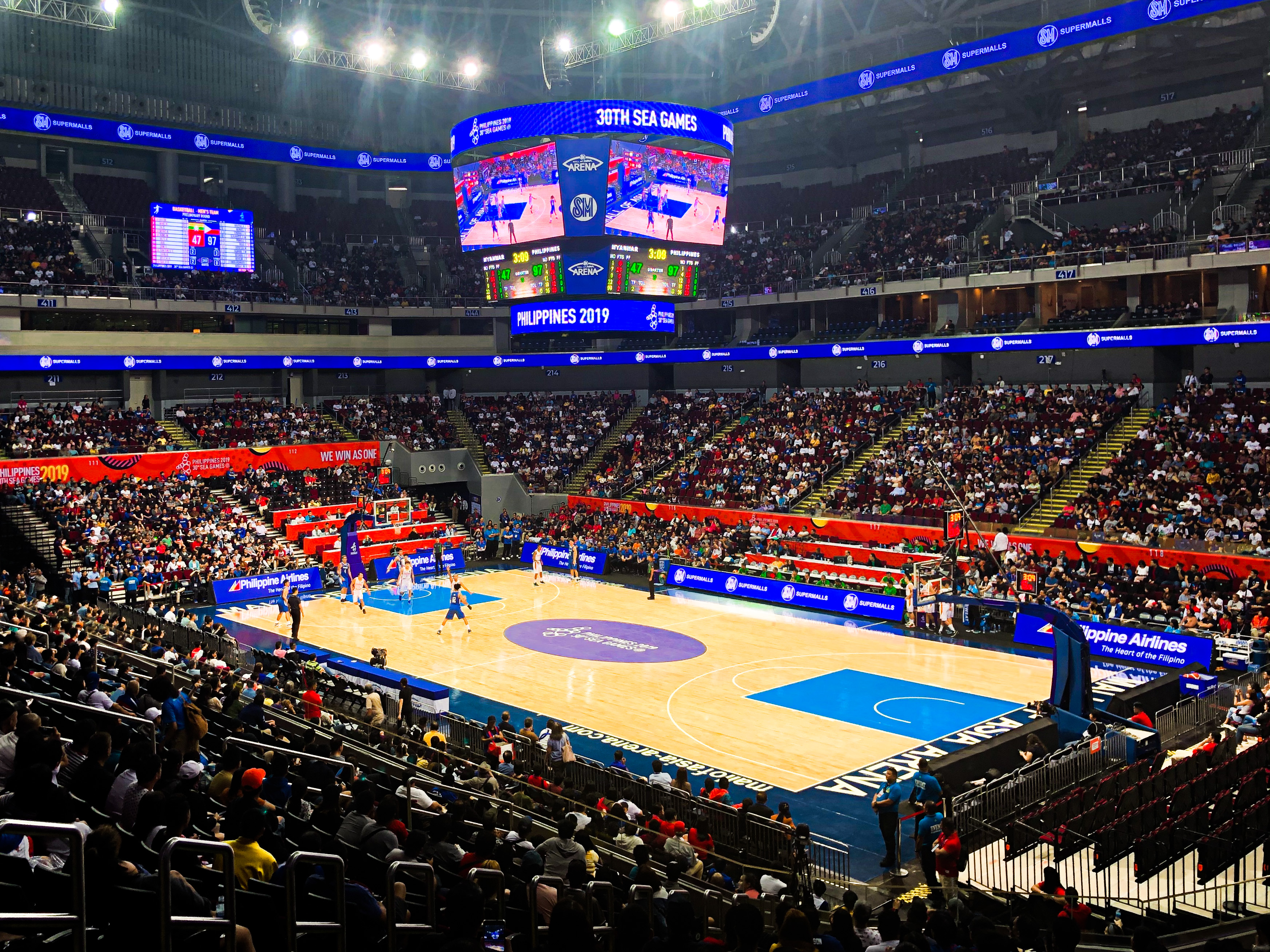
The Mall of Asia Arena hosted the 5x5 basketball events

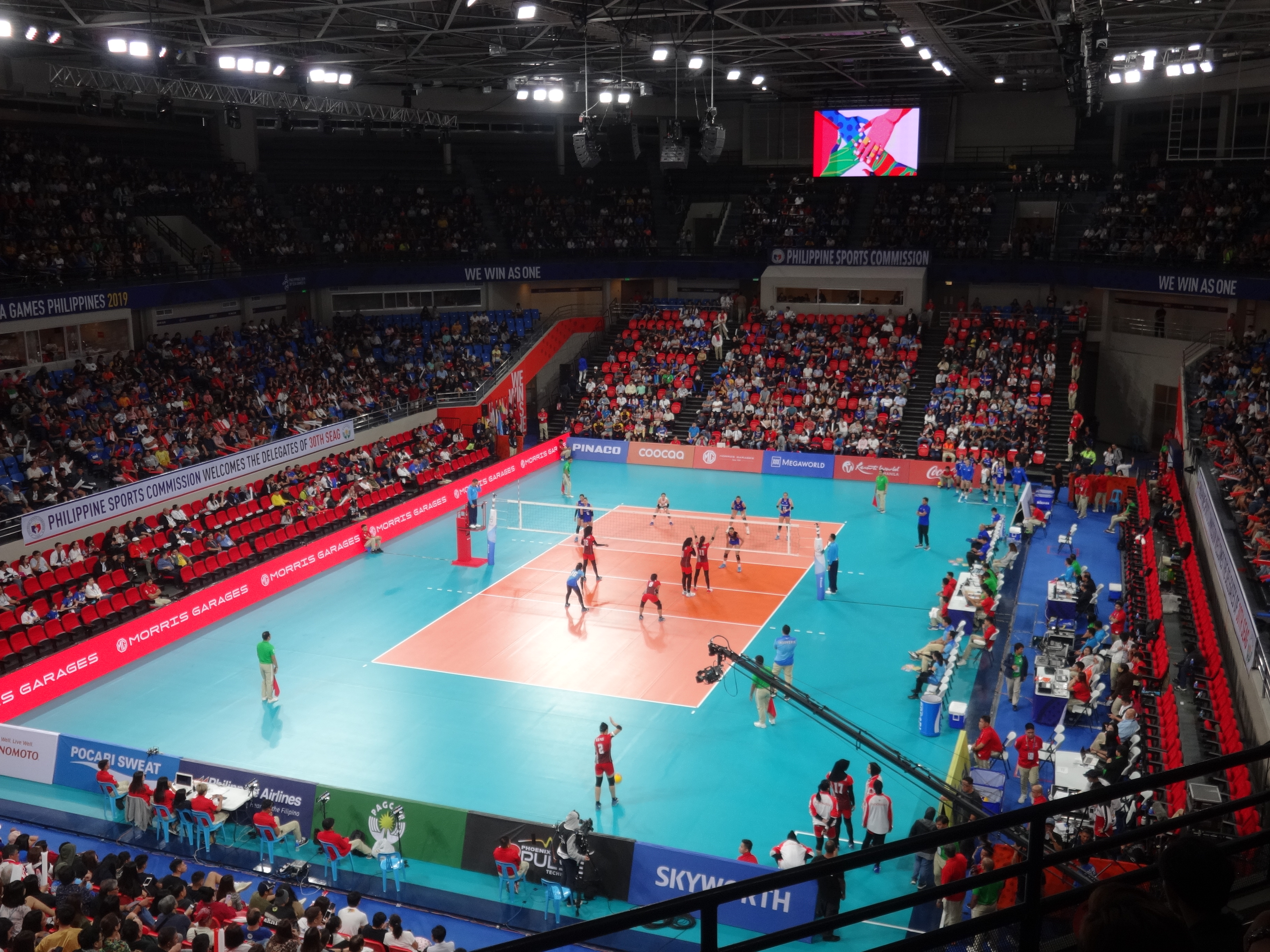
The PhilSports Arena hosted the indoor volleyball events.

City/Municipality	Venue	Events	Capacity
Makati	Manila Polo Club	Squash	
Mandaluyong	SM Skating Megamall	Speed Skating, Figure Skating	
Mandaluyong	Starmall EDSA-Shaw	Bowling	
Manila	Manila Hotel Tent	Billiards	
Manila	Ninoy Aquino Stadium	Taekwondo, Weightlifting	6,000
Manila	Rizal Memorial Stadium	Football (Men's)	12,873
Manila	Rizal Memorial Sports Complex – Tennis Center	Tennis, Soft tennis	
Manila	Rizal Memorial Coliseum	Gymnastics (Aerobic, Artistic, Rhythmic)	6,100
Muntinlupa	Filinvest City	Obstacle Course	
Muntinlupa	Muntinlupa Sports Center	Badminton	
Pasay	PICC Forum	Boxing	
Pasay	Cuneta Astrodome	Kickboxing	12,000
Pasay	Mall of Asia Arena	Basketball	15,000
Pasay	SM Mall of Asia Skating Rink	Ice hockey	
Pasay	World Trade Center	Fencing, Karatedo, Wushu	
Pasig	PhilSports Arena	Indoor Volleyball	10,000
Quezon City	UP Diliman Gymnasium	Floorball	
San Juan	Filoil Flying V Centre	3x3 Basketball, Esports	6,000
Taguig	Philippine Marine Shooting Range	Shooting	

==== Subic cluster ====
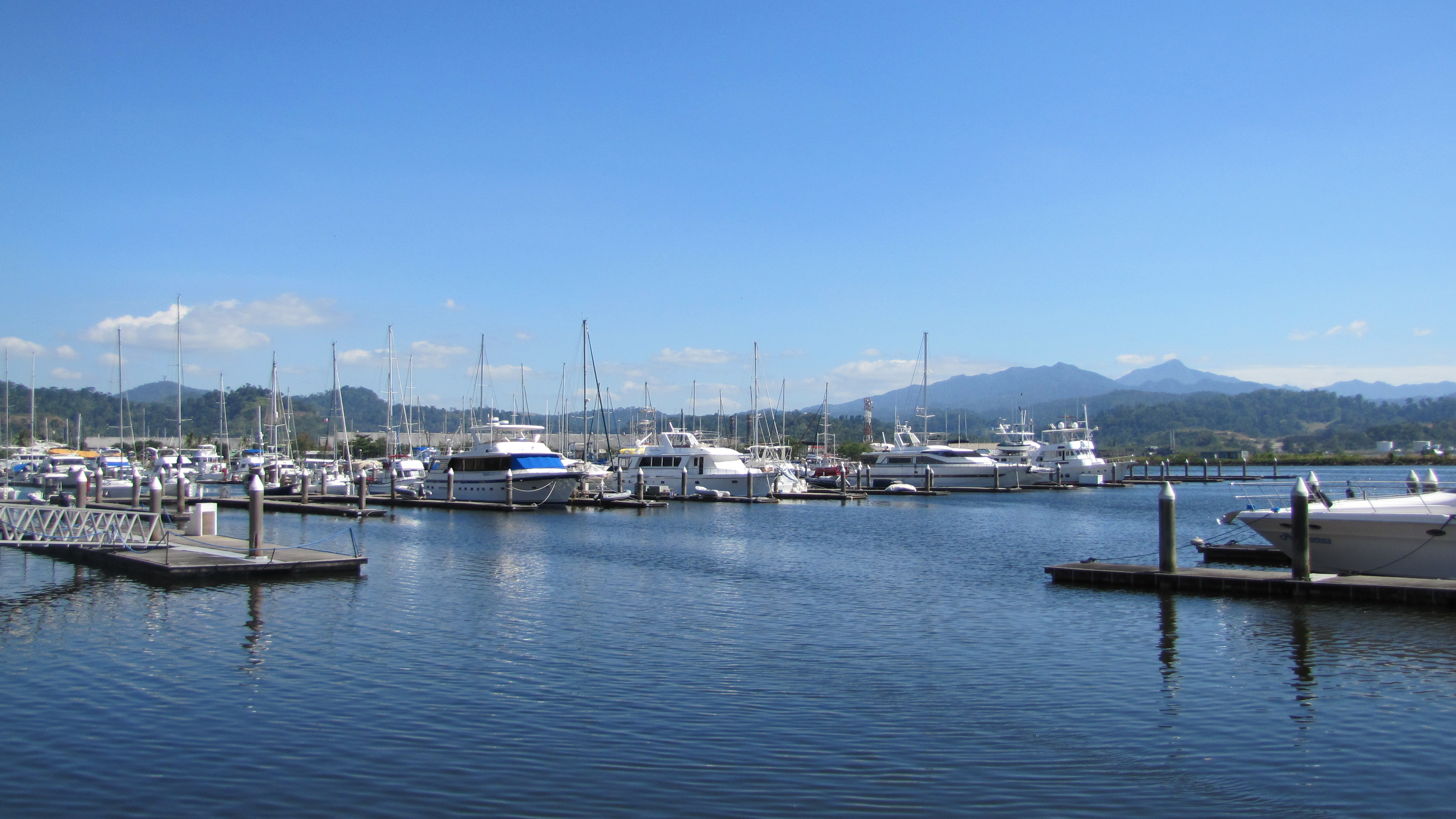
The Subic Bay Yacht Club hosted sailing event.

City/Municipality	Venue	Events	Capacity
Olongapo	Lighthouse Marina	Windsurfing	
Olongapo	Malaawan Park	Canoe/kayak, Traditional boat race, Dragon boat racing	
Olongapo	Subic Bay Tennis Court	Beach volleyball, Beach handball	
Olongapo	Subic Bay Exhibition and Convention Center	Muay Thai, Pencak Silat, Table tennis	
Olongapo	Subic Bay Yacht Club	Sailing	
Olongapo	Subic Gymnasium	Sepak takraw	
Subic	Subic Bay Boardwalk	Aquatics (Open Water Swimming–10 km), Duathlon, Triathlon, Modern Pentathlon	
Subic	Travelers Hotel	Chess	
Subic	Kamana Sanctuary, Triboa Bay	Rowing	

==== Other areas ====
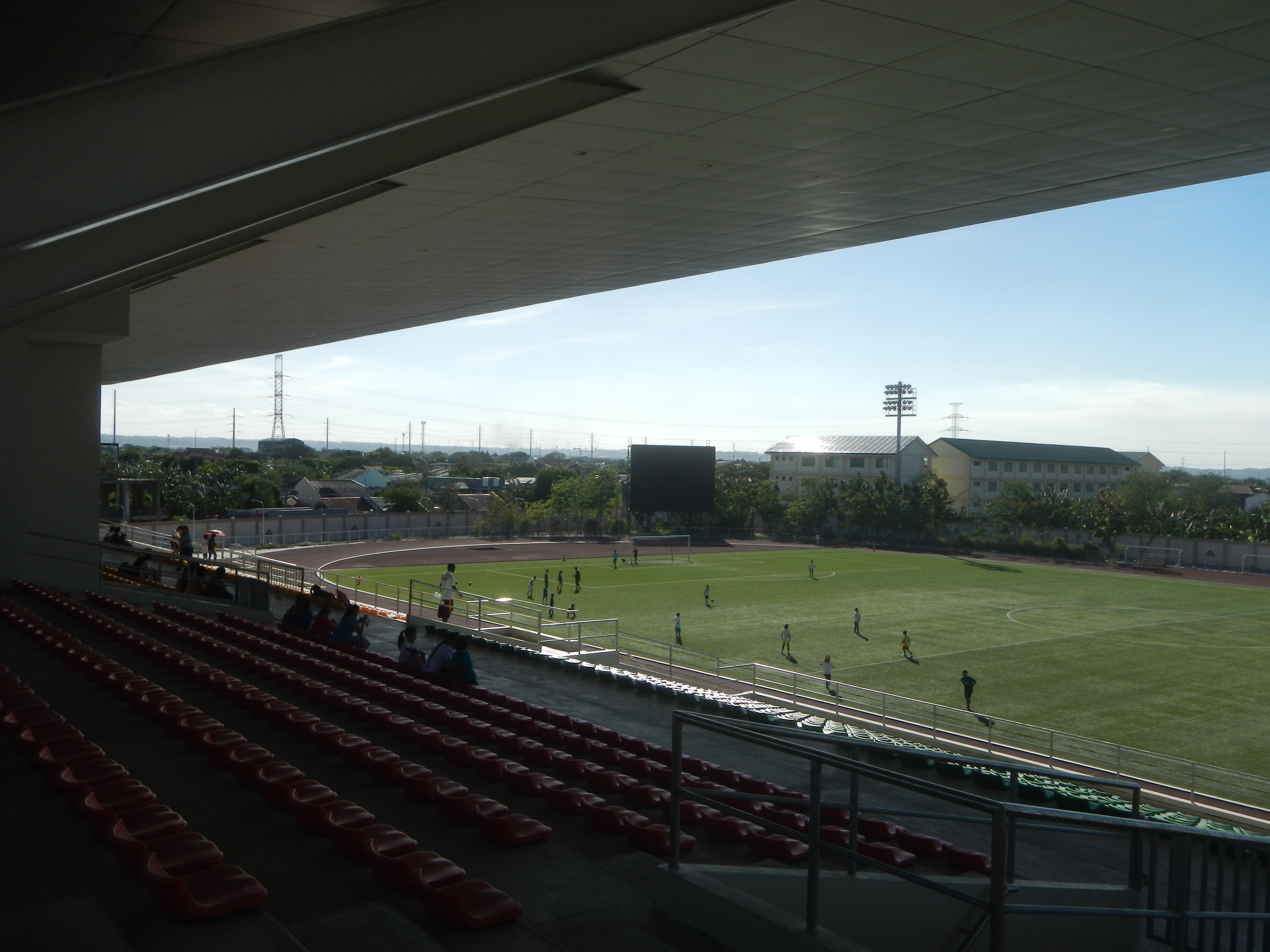
The Biñan Football Stadium hosted women's football and selected men's football matches

City/Municipality (Province)	Venue	Events	Capacity
Calatagan (Batangas)	Miguel Romero Field	Polo	
Calatagan (Batangas)	Iñigo Zobel Field	Polo	
Laurel (Batangas)	Tatlong Bungo, Brgy. Niyugan	Cycling (Mountain biking)	
Imus (Cavite)	Vermosa Sports Hub	Underwater hockey	
Imus (Cavite)	Imus Grandstand and Track Oval	Football	4,800
Maragondon (Cavite)	Seaside Race Track	Skateboarding (downhill)	
Tagaytay (Cavite)	Tagaytay International Convention Center	Cycling (BMX, Road), Skateboarding	
Tagaytay (Cavite)	Tagaytay Extreme Sports Complex	Skateboarding	
Biñan (Laguna)	Biñan Football Stadium	Football (Women's and Men's)	2,580
Los Baños (Laguna)	Centro Mall	Floorball, Indoor hockey	
Santa Rosa (Laguna)	Sta. Rosa Sports Complex	Netball	
San Juan (La Union)	Monalisa Point	Surfing	

=== Non-competition venues ===
Cluster	City/Municipality	Venue	Events/Designation	Capacity
Clark	Angeles	Bayanihan Park	Countdown ceremony and launch	N/A
Clark	Angeles	Clark International Airport	Port of Entry	N/A
Clark	Angeles	Parade Grounds	Fan Zone	N/A
Clark	Capas	New Clark City Athletes Village	Official residence of the aquatics and athletics athletes	N/A
Clark	Mabalacat	ASEAN Convention Center	International Broadcast Center, Main Press Center	N/A
Other areas	Bocaue	Philippine Arena	Opening ceremony (except Cauldron lighting)	55,000

== Marketing ==
=== Official launch and branding ===
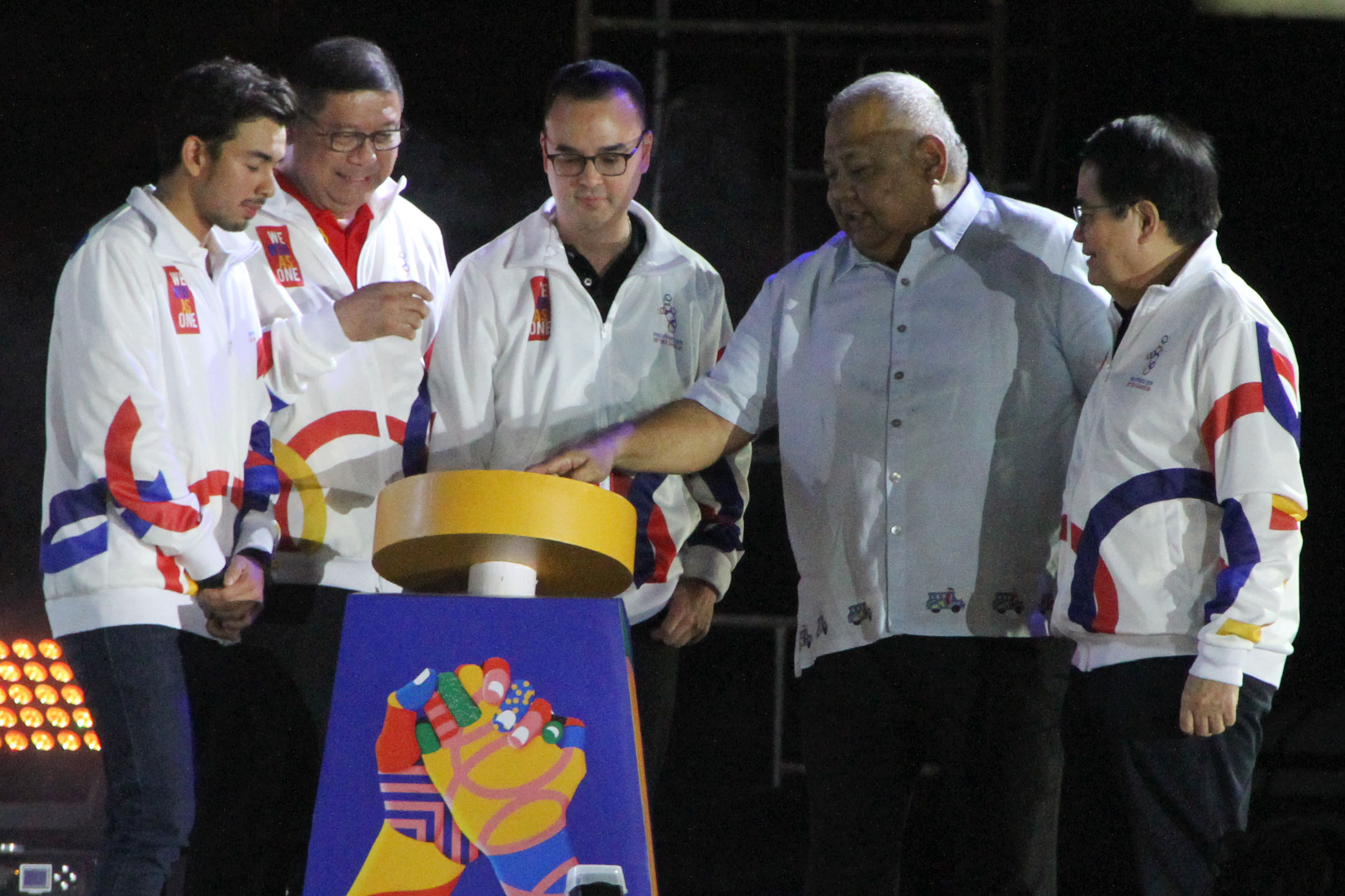
Officials lead the launch of the one-year countdown for the Games at the Bayanihan Park held on November 30, 2018

The official launch and countdown ceremony of the 2019 Southeast Asian Games was made at the Bayanihan Park at the Clark Freeport Zone in Pampanga on November 30, 2018 which was attended by representatives of the 11 participating countries of the Games. At the ceremony the logo and theme of the Games were officially unveiled. A 15 m (49 ft) structure consisting of 11 rings representing the 11 nations was also lit up as part of the countdown ceremony. The mascot was shortly confirmed as official outside the countdown ceremony rites.

==== Motto ====
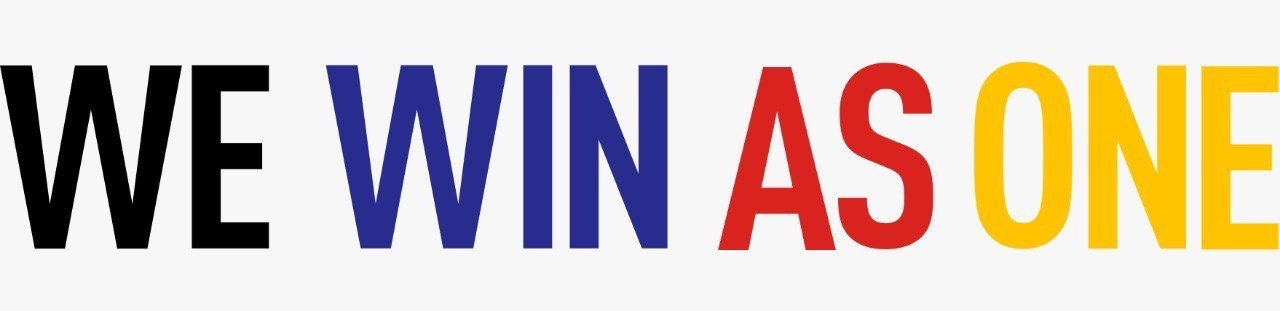
"We Win as One", the official motto of the 2019 games.

The official motto of 2019 Southeast Asian Games as well as its theme is "We Win as One."

==== Logo ====
A preview of the logo of the 2019 SEA Games was earlier presented in front of the Olympic Council of Asia on August 20, 2018, in Jakarta, Indonesia during the 2018 Asian Games. The official logo depicts 11 rings from the logo of the Southeast Asian Games Federation forming the shape of the Philippines and colored with the red, blue, dark blue, yellow, and green. It was made official during the launching ceremony in Bayanihan Park on November 30, 2018. Public reception of the logo in the host country was mixed, with critics stating that the logo lacked creativity and design interest.

==== Mascot ====
Pami, the official mascot of the Games.

Pami, with their name derived from the "pamilya", the Filipino word for "family", is the official mascot of the Games. According to 2019 SEA Games executive director Ramon Suzara, the mascot represents every nation, every athlete, every person coming together that support each other at the games. The mascot with a joyful character has been described to have been made from squishy spherical balls. Just like the logo and theme, it was also previewed during the meeting in Jakarta, Indonesia. It was made official during the countdown ceremony in Bayanihan Park.

==== Theme songs ====
Ryan Cayabyab composed the official theme song of the 2019 Southeast Asian Games, which shares the name of the games' official slogan "We Win As One". Floy Quintos wrote the lyrics for the song, which was officially launched on July 11, 2019. Lea Salonga performed for the official release of theme song. The theme song and music video for "We Win as One" was formally released on September 3, 2019, at the Resorts World Manila (now Newport World Resorts). The music video which was shot at the New Clark City Sports Hub was directed by Shem Hampac and was produced by Equinox Manila.

Cayabyab originally made the composition of the song, with the expectation that 11 singers would do the official performance. The song was revised, in order to be more suitable for a solo performance, after Lea Salonga was tapped to do the performance. Cayabyab and Jimmy Antiporda were the ones responsible for the arrangement of the song.

Sarah Geronimo released "Who We Are", a legacy song for the workforce and volunteers of the 2019 Southeast Asian Games. The song was eventually played in several victory ceremonies with Filipino medalists. The music video was shot on several venues of the games.

Arnel Pineda and Filipino band KO Jones also released "Rock the SEA Games", which was also played during several SEA Games competitions, and was performed during the closing ceremonies on December 11, 2019.

In March 2020, "We Win as One" was remixed as "We Heal As One" in response to the 2020 coronavirus pandemic in the Philippines. Ryan Cayabyab also composed the song with new lyrics in English and Tagalog by Floy Quintos; it was performed by various Filipino singers.

==== Official attire ====
Clothing for official use were designed for the games various use. The presenters of the games' victory ceremonies would be wearing attire inspired from Filipino traditional clothing namely the Balintawak dress, barong tagalog, and Baro't Saya. Color coded polo shirt and jacket were devised: For Southeast Asian Games Federation officials it was blue, for technical officials, green, for volunteers, red, and Philippine SEA Games Organizing Committee (PHISGOC) officials, navy blue. Business uniforms made by fashion designer Rajo Laurel will also be used. Laurel made two sets of uniform for women (black and white sets) and three sets for men (one black set and two white sets).

The barong tagalog was used as the official uniform for Team Philippines' parade in the 2019 SEA Games Opening Ceremony. The official uniform was designed by Francis Libiran, while the Filipino athletes' official training apparel is sponsored by Asics.

=== Sponsors ===
There were three tiers of sponsorship for the 2019 Southeast Asian Games, depending on the amount of funds a company contributes to the games; Preferred sponsors contributed ₱500,000, Gold sponsors contributed ₱2,000,000 and Platinum sponsors contributed ₱3,000,000. Philippine Airlines provided the air transport for the delegates of the Games. Singapore-based Razer Inc. will be involved in the organization of the Esports events.

Six companies signed their partnership agreements with PHISGOC on February 13, 2019. France-based GL events provided the overlays and temporary structures of the 39 sporting venues to be used for the 2019 SEA Games. Grand Sport Group, a sports apparel company from Thailand, was the official provider of the uniforms for the workforce, volunteers and technical officials. The official kits of the national athletes of the host country were provided by Asics. Mikasa, Marathon, and Molten were the providers of the official game balls and sporting equipment of the games, all brought in by Sonak Corporation. PHISGOC appointed MediaPro Asia as the official exclusive production, media rights, marketing and sponsorship agent of the games.

Autonomous vehicle (AV) services from United States-based COAST Autonomous was used to serve athletes and officials between the Athletes' Village, aquatic center and athletics stadium in New Clark City. This will be the first ever implementation of an AV service in a major sporting event.

SM Lifestyle, Inc., an arm of SM Prime Holdings, was named the Games' official venue partner with the venues for men's basketball and ice hockey held in facilities managed by the SM Group.

Pennsylvania-based NEP Group was the official host broadcaster of the games which sold full and partial broadcasting rights to other broadcasters.

Skyworth was named as the official television partner of the Games. They covered events prior to the competition proper including the torch relays in the Philippines and Malaysia, as well as the Game Hub and Fan Zones. The platinum-tier sponsorship was helped secured by Singapore firm Mediapro Asia.

Mastercard was the main sponsor of the Games' official mobile app which would allow users to view the schedule and results as well purchase tickets and food in the venue.

The organizers secured insurance for the Games' athletes and officials from Standard Insurance which covered a period of October 15 – December 15, 2019, with each beneficiary having a coverage of ₱300 thousand. The insurance plan covered deaths or any accident-related injuries incurred both during the Games and in training, as well as losses due to sabotage and terrorist acts. Standard Insurance has EMA-Global as its medical service provider partner.

Sponsors of the 2019 SEA Games
Platinum
- Ajinomoto
- Megaworld-Resorts World Manila
- Morris Garages Philippines
- Philippine Airlines
- Philippine Amusement and Gaming Corporation
- Phoenix Petroleum
- Pinaco
- Skyworth-Coocaa
Gold
- Coca-Cola
- Mastercard
- Nestlé (Milo)
- NLEX Corporation (North Luzon Expressway-Subic–Clark–Tarlac Expressway)
- PLDT-Smart Communications
- Pocari Sweat
- Razer Inc.
Prestige
- Filinvest City
- Government Service Insurance System
- Marathon
- Mikasa Sports
- Molten Corporation
Preferred
- Asics
- BMW
- FBT
- GL events
- Grand Sport Group
- SM Lifestyle
Official Banking Partners
- Chinabank
- Philippine National Bank
Official Convenience Store
- FamilyMart
Official Commemorative Watch
- Ibarra Watches
Official Insurance Partner
- Standard Insurance
Official Media Partners
- Bombo Radyo Philippines
- CNN Philippines
- Digital Out-of-Home
- Inquirer Group of Companies
- Radio Mindanao Network
- Rakuten Viber
- United Neon Media Group
Official Host Broadcaster
- NEP Group

== The Games ==
=== Opening ceremony ===
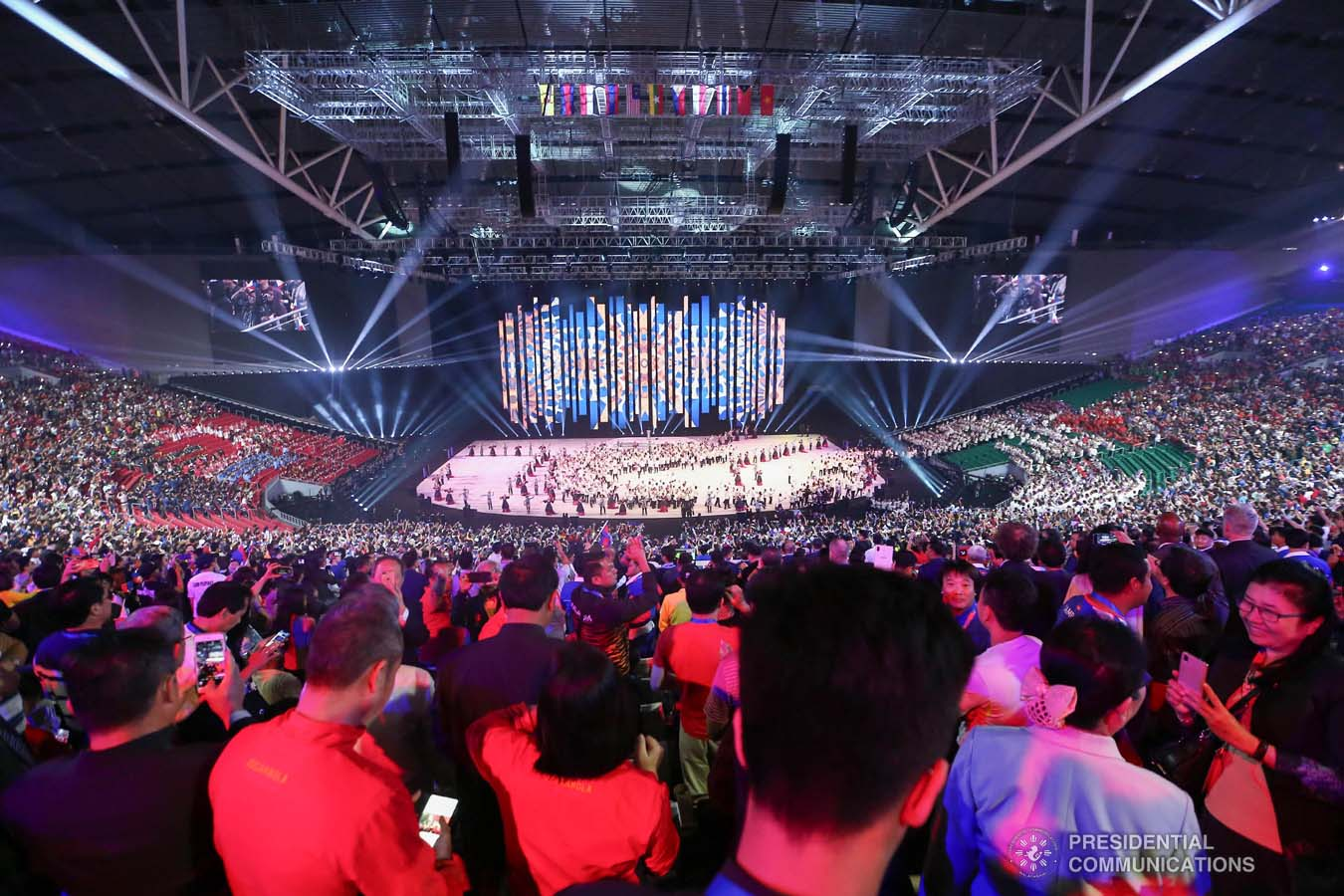
The Philippine Arena in Bocaue hosted the opening ceremony.

The Philippine Arena in Bocaue, Bulacan, the world's largest indoor arena, hosted the opening ceremony of the 2019 Southeast Asian Games. In the opening ceremony, Manny Pacquiao and Nesthy Petecio lit the cauldron in New Clark City. The lighting of the cauldron was not live and pre-recorded. It was initially planned to have conducted live but in anticipation of Typhoon Kammuri (Tisoy), a contingency had to be made. A separate cauldron was not built near the arena. Carlos Yulo was designated as the torch bearer and light the cauldron.

The opening ceremony was inspired from the opening ceremonies of the 2017 Southeast Asian Games in Kuala Lumpur, Malaysia, and the 2018 Winter Olympics in Pyeongchang, South Korea. Originally, the organizers announced plans to conduct a digital lighting of the flame during the event, but later added a backup plan for a "normal, traditional opening ceremony". The American entertainment company FiveCurrents, which produced the opening and closing ceremonies of the 2002 Winter Olympics, the 2007 Pan American Games and 2012 Summer Olympics, was hired to advise the local companies; Video Sonic and Stage Craft.

Filipino-American artist apl.de.ap, a member of The Black Eyed Peas, performed at the opening ceremony. Collaborating with Ryan Cayabyab, he performed a remix of his troupe's song rendered in Filipino traditional instruments and orchestral accompaniment. Previously the organizers negotiated with another Filipino-American artist, Bruno Mars, to do the same, but the negotiations did not advance. There were also expectations for performances by Filipino singer Lea Salonga and Journey lead singer Arnel Pineda, but they did not advance either, with Salonga declining due to an agenda conflict with the local production of the musical Sweeney Todd: The Demon Barber of Fleet Street.

=== Closing ceremony ===
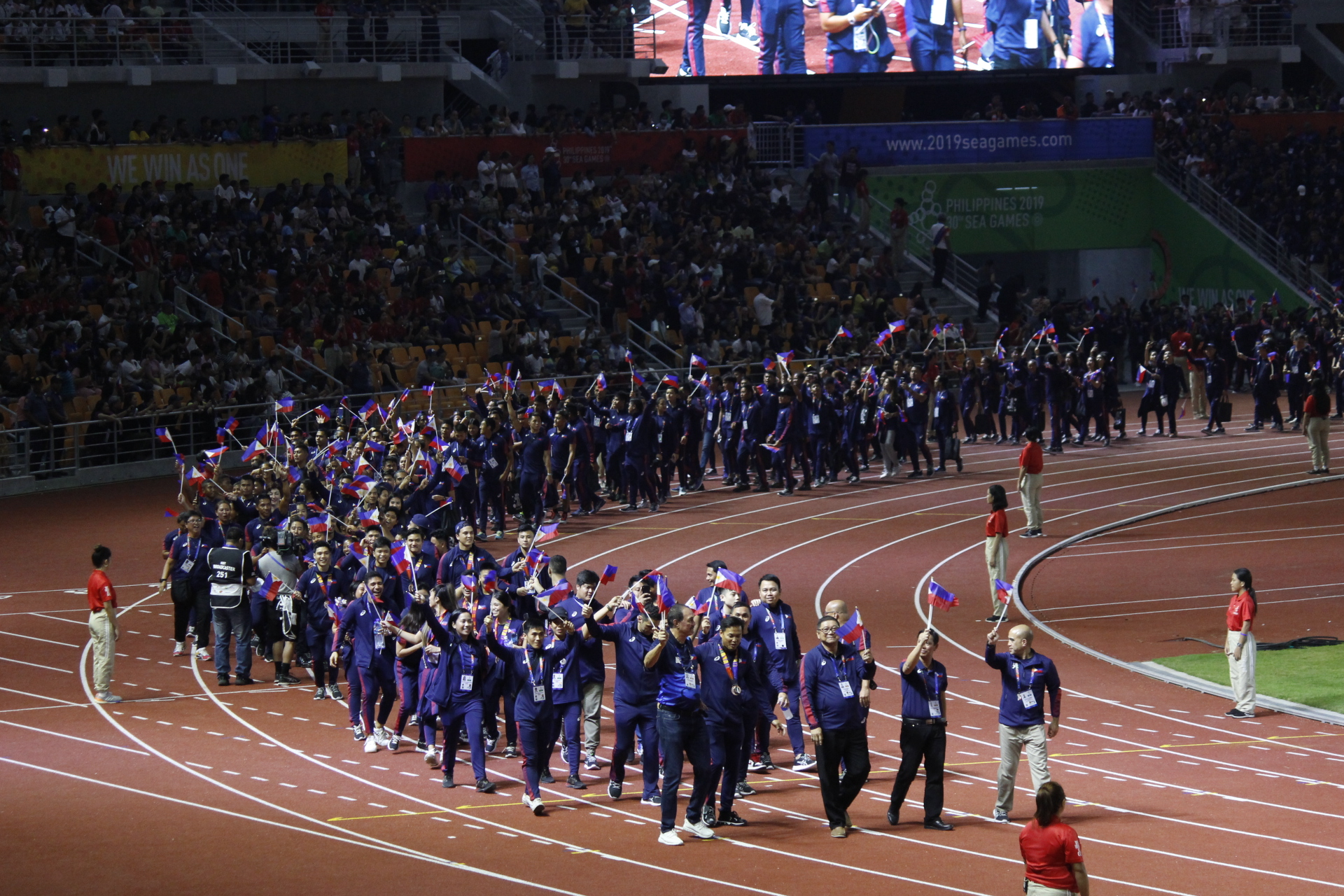
The Athletics Stadium in New Clark City hosted the closing ceremony.

The closing ceremony was held in the athletics stadium in New Clark City. The Black Eyed Peas as a group performed in the closing ceremony. Arnel Pineda and Filipino band KO Jones are also one of the performers. Also, part of the ceremony is handing over the sea games flag to next host country Vietnam Philippine Olympic Committee President Abraham “Bambol” Tolentino and Chairman of the 30th SEA Games organizing committee Allan Peter Cayetano passes to Vietnam as the host of 31st SEA Games. A cultural presentation of Vietnam had been shown after the handover.

=== Participating nations ===
All 11 members of Southeast Asian Games Federation (SEAGF) are expected to take part in the 2019 SEA Games. Below is a list of all the participating NOCs.

- Brunei (257)
- Cambodia (510)
- Timor-Leste (48)
- Indonesia (837)
- Laos (419)
- Malaysia (773)
- Myanmar (952)
- Philippines (1,115) (host)
- Singapore (666)
- Thailand (980)
- Vietnam (856)

=== Sports ===
A record of 530 events in 56 sports had been approved to be contested at the 2019 Southeast Asian Games, making this edition the largest Southeast Asian Games in terms of the number of sports and events contested. An initial list of 32 sports to be contested at the 2019 Southeast Asian Games was agreed upon following the two-day SEA Games Federation Council Meeting from May 16 to 17, 2018 at the Shangri-La at the Fort in Bonifacio Global City, Taguig, Metro Manila. Badminton was initially excluded by the hosts from the initial list, but was reinstated following the objections of the National Olympic Committees of Malaysia, Indonesia, Myanmar, Singapore, and Thailand. Vovinam was later dropped from the finalized list of sports released by the organizers in mid-December 2018 and polo was included in January 2019.

The following is a list of sports that were contested at the Games, including partial figures for the number of events in each sport:

- Aquatics
  - Diving (4)
  - Swimming (39)
  - Water polo (2)
- Archery (10)
- Arnis (20)
- Athletics (48)
- Badminton (7)
- Baseball/Softball
  - Baseball (1)
  - Softball (1)
- Basketball (4)
  - 5x5 Basketball (2)
  - 3x3 Basketball (2)
- Billiards and snooker (10)
- Bowling (9)
- Boxing (13)
- Canoeing (13)
  - Canoeing/Kayak (7)
  - Traditional boat race (6)
- Chess (5)
- Cycling (12)
  - BMX (3)
  - Mountain biking (4)
  - Road biking (5)
- Dancesport (14)
- Duathlon (3)
- Esports (6)
- Fencing (12)
- Football (2)
- Floorball (2)
- Golf (4)
- Gymnastics (19)
  - Artistic (12)
  - Aerobic (2)
  - Rhythmic (5)
- Beach handball (1)
- Ice skating (8)
  - Figure skating (2)
  - Short track speed skating (6)
- Hockey
  - Ice hockey (1)
  - Indoor hockey (2)
- Judo (16)
- Jujitsu (11)
- Karate (13)
- Kickboxing (8)
- Kurash (10)
- Lawn bowls/Petanque (10)
  - Lawn bowls
  - Pétanque
- Muay Thai (6)
- Modern pentathlon (6)
- Netball (1)
- Obstacle racing (4)
- Pencak silat (9)
- Polo (1)
- Rowing (6)
- Rugby sevens (2)
- Sailing (11)
- Sambo (7)
- Sepak takraw (6)
- Shooting (14)
- Skateboarding (8)
- Squash (5)
- Surfing (2)
- Table tennis (4)
- Taekwondo (22)
- Tennis
  - Soft tennis (3)
  - Tennis (5)
- Triathlon (3)
- Underwater hockey
- Volleyball (4)
- Waterskiing (4)
- Weightlifting (10)
- Wrestling (14)
- Wushu (16)

In addition, the following were demonstration events:

- Chess (3)

The proposal to include additional sports was allowed through suggestions of the different NOCs until June 13, 2018. There was reportedly a provision that a proposed sport must be backed by at least four nations to be instated to the list. Among the sports proposed to be included in the final list are esports, netball, obstacle course, sambo, skateboarding, shuttlecock, surfing, water-skiing, sport climbing, and air sports. Malaysia planned to propose the inclusion of tennis, ice skating and martial arts which were featured in the previous edition, while Cambodia lobbied for the inclusion of tennis, petanque, and vovinam.

On September 30, 2018, during a meeting at the SEA Games Council Federation headquarters in Bangkok, the NOCs of Southeast Asia approved 56 sports in total to be contested in the Games; all sports were proposed by the NOC of the host nation except the disciplines of floorball, vovinam, and indoor hockey which were lobbied for by the other NOCs. Arnis, a Filipino martial art, was last featured as a demonstration sport in the 2005 edition. Arnis will be a regular sport in the 2019 games, and its national sport association lobbied for 20 events for the discipline (16 in combat; 4 in anyo (lit. 'form')) The Philippines will introduce 3x3 basketball for the first time in the history of the games.

Upon the approval of the 56 proposed sports, it was reported that no additional sports were to be added. However the Philippine Olympic Committee later announced that it would propose the addition of beach handball and beach netball after consultations with the sports' respective national associations to the final list of sports to be contested in the Games to be agreed upon on November. Following a meeting of the Southeast Asian Games Federation Council from November 23 to 24, 2018, the approval of the 56 proposed sports were finalized with 530 events planned to be contested. The number of events was finalized by mid-December 2018.

=== Calendar ===
OC	Opening ceremony	●	Event competitions	1	Gold medal events	CC	Closing ceremony

		November									December											Events
		22 Fri	23 Sat	24 Sun	25 Mon	26 Tue	27 Wed	28 Thu	29 Fri	30 Sat	1 Sun	2 Mon	3 Tue	4 Wed	5 Thu	6 Fri	7 Sat	8 Sun	9 Mon	10 Tue	11 Wed	Events
Ceremonies										OC											CC	—N/a
Aquatics	Diving															2	2					45
Aquatics	Open Water																			1		45
Aquatics	Swimming													7	6	6	7	6	6			45
Aquatics	Water Polo					●	●	●	●		2											45
Archery															●	●	●	5	5			10
Arnis											8	8	4									20
Athletics																2	8	16	11	11		48
Badminton											●	●	1	1	●	●	●	●	5			7
Baseball / Softball	Baseball											●	●	●		●	●	1				3
Baseball / Softball	Softball											●	●	●	●	●	●	2				3
Basketball	5x5 Basketball													●	●	●	●	●	●	2		4
Basketball	3x3 Basketball										●	2										4
Billiards													●	●	1	1	1	2	2	3		10
Bowling													2	2	1	2	●	2				9
Boxing														●	●	●		●	13			13
Canoeing	Traditional Boat Racing																3	3				13
Canoeing	Canoe / Kayak															4	3					13
Chess												●	2			●	1	2				5
Cycling											2	2			2	1	1	2	1	2		13
Dancesport											14											14
Esports															●	●	●	1	3	2		6
Fencing													2	2	2	2	2	2				12
Floorball					●	●	●	●	●		2											2
Football					●	●	●	●	●		●	●	●	●	●		●	1		1		2
Golf														●	●	2	●	2				4
Gymnastics											1	1	5	5		●	5		3			20
Beach handball																	●	●	●	●	1	1
Indoor hockey														●	●	●	●	●	●	2		2
Ice hockey											●	●	●	●	●	●	●	1				1
Ice skating	Figure skating								●		2											8
Ice skating	Short track												3	3								8
Jujitsu																			6	5		11
Judo														2	6	6	2					16
Karate																	4	5	4			13
Kickboxing																	●	●	3	5		8
Kurash											5	5										10
Lawnbowls / Pétanque	Lawn bowls										●	4	●	2								10
Lawnbowls / Pétanque	Pétanque											●			2	2						10
Modern pentathlon															3	2	1					6
Muaythai														2	●	●	●	7				9
Netball					●	●	●	●	●		●	1										1
Obstacle racing												●		4		2						6
Pencak silat												3	1	●	5							9
Polo				●		●		●			1				●	●		●	1			2
Rowing																●	3	3				6
Rugby sevens																	●	2				2
Sailing / Windsurfing	Sailing													●	●	●	7	●	2			12
Sailing / Windsurfing	Windsurfing															●	●	●	3			12
Sambo															4	3						7
Sepak takraw											2	●		●	1	●	●	1	1	1		6
Shooting												3	1	2	2	1	1	1	1	2		14
Skateboarding														●	2	●	2	4				8
Soft tennis																	1	1	●	1		3
Squash											●	●	2	●	●	1	●	●	2			5
Surfing												●			●	●		4				4
Table tennis																●	2	●	●	2		4
Taekwondo																	8	8	6			22
Tennis											●	●	●	●	●	2	3					5
Duathlon / Triathlon	Duathlon											2			1							6
Duathlon / Triathlon	Triathlon										2	1										6
Underwater hockey												●		2	2							4
Volleyball	Indoor											●	●	●	●	●	●	●	1	1		4
Volleyball	Beach								●		●	●	●	●	●	2						4
Wakeboarding / Waterski																●	●	5				5
Weightlifting											2	3	3	2								10
Wrestling																			7	7		14
Wushu											3	2	11									16
Daily medal events											46	37	37	36	40	43	67	89	86	48	1	530
Cumulative total											46	83	120	156	196	239	306	395	481	529	530	530
		22 Fri	23 Sat	24 Sun	25 Mon	26 Tue	27 Wed	28 Thu	29 Fri	30 Sat	1 Sun	2 Mon	3 Tue	4 Wed	5 Thu	6 Fri	7 Sat	8 Sun	9 Mon	10 Tue	11 Wed	Total events
		November									December											Total events

Source: / Result SEA Games A / Result SEA Games B / Complete Schedule Several events were rescheduled due to inclement weather (without surfing).

== Medal table ==
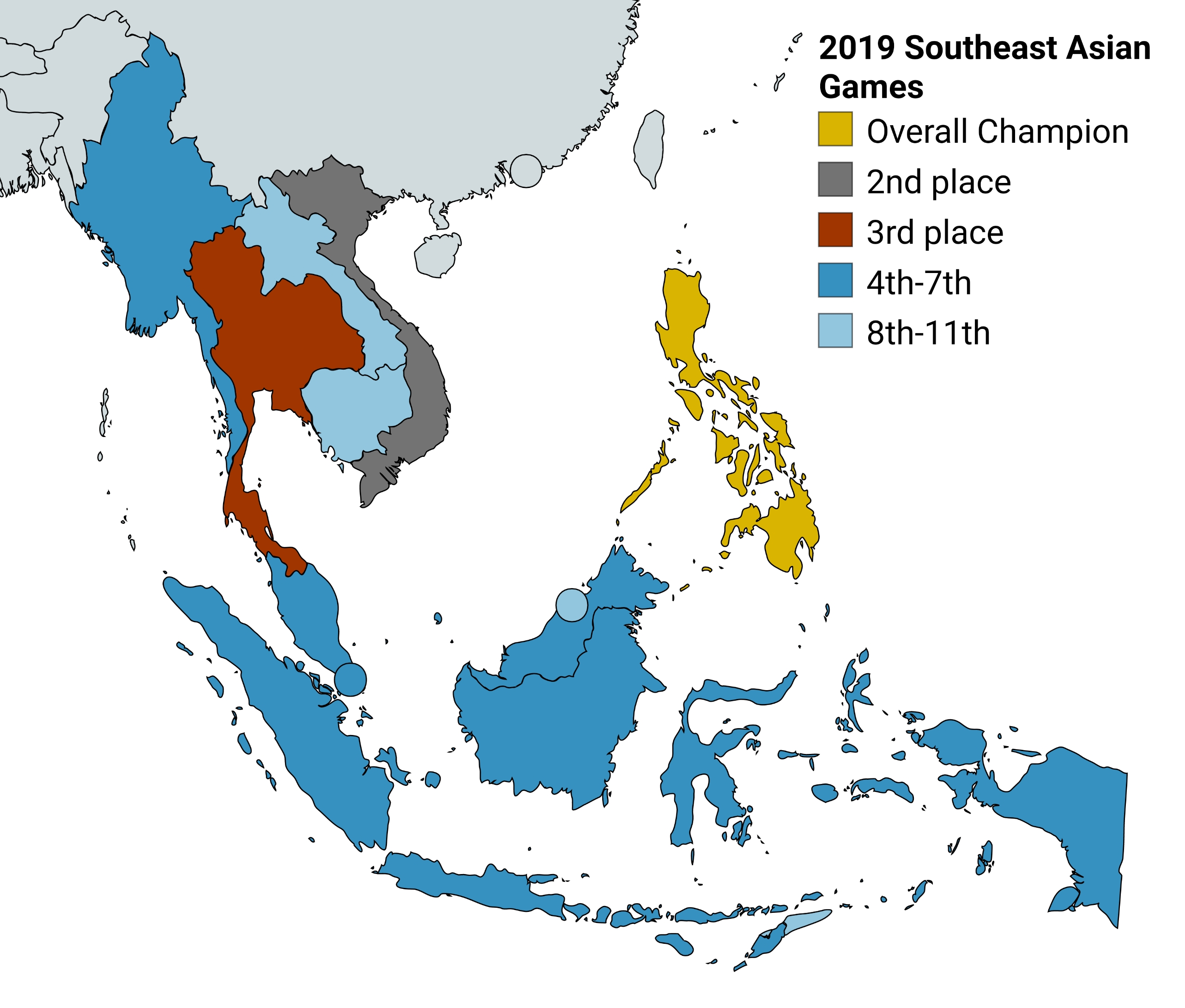
Result map of 2019 Southeast Asian Games

The 2019 Southeast Asian Games had 530 events in 56 sports, resulting in 530 medal sets to be distributed. Other additional number of medal sets that were distributed, were announced before the awarding of different sports in the Games respectively.

The Philippines won 149 gold medals, 117 silver medals, and 121 bronze medals, finishing with their best finish yet on the games up to date.

* Host nation (Philippines)

2019 Southeast Asian Games Medal Table
Rank	Nation	Gold	Silver	Bronze	Total
1	Philippines*	149	117	121	387
2	Vietnam	98	85	105	288
3	Thailand	92	103	123	318
4	Indonesia	72	84	111	267
5	Malaysia	55	58	71	184
6	Singapore	53	46	68	167
7	Myanmar	4	18	51	73
8	Cambodia	4	6	36	46
9	Brunei	2	5	6	13
10	Laos	1	5	28	34
11	Timor-Leste	0	1	5	6
Totals (11 entries)		530	528	725	1,783

Source: 2019 SEA Games Medal Tally

== Broadcasting ==
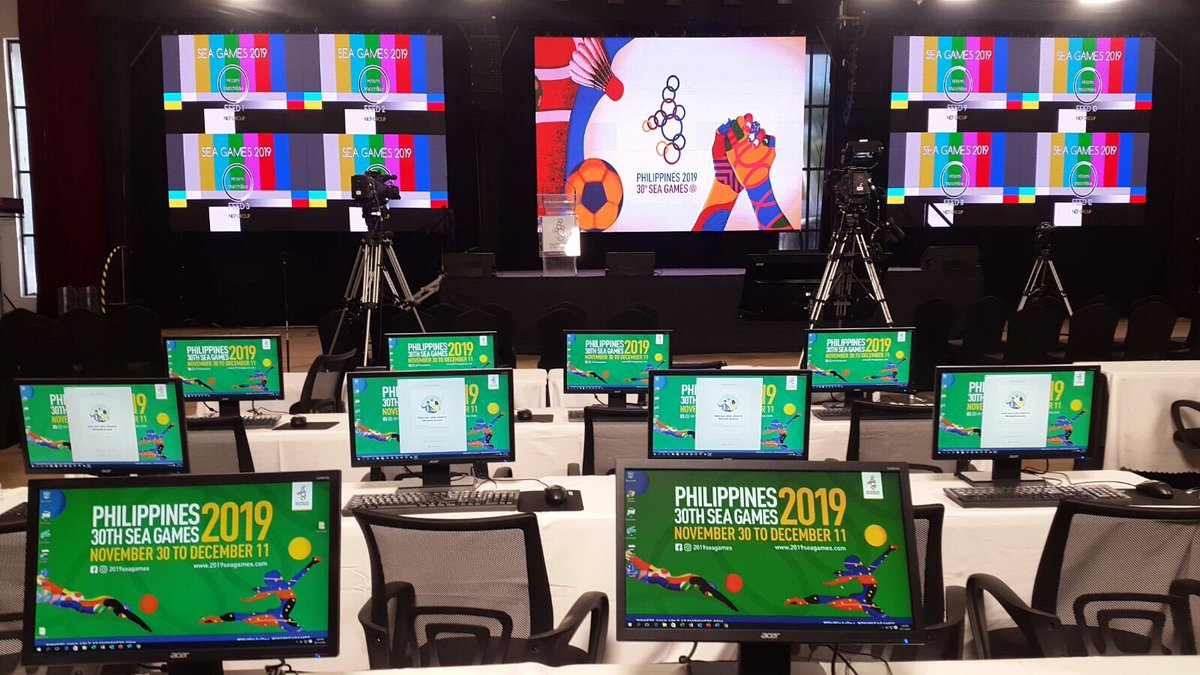
2019 SEA Games International Broadcast Center at the Clark Freeport Zone

Key

* Host nation (Philippines)

Country	Official broadcaster/s	Ref.
Brunei	Radio Television Brunei, Kristal-Astro	
Cambodia	Hang Meas	
Indonesia	MNC Group, TVRI	
Laos	LNTV	
Malaysia	Radio Televisyen Malaysia, Astro	
Myanmar	MRTV	
Philippines	ABS-CBN, PTV, TV5 Network Inc.	
Singapore	Mediacorp	
South Korea	SBS, SPOTV (only for Vietnam's matches in men's football tournament)	
Thailand	Television Pool of Thailand	
Timor-Leste	RTTL	
Vietnam	VTV, HTV, VTC and VOV	

== Concerns and controversies ==
The 2019 Southeast Asian Games was marred by a series of controversies, including corruption allegations, marketing and logistics problems, and poor treatment of delegates.

== See also ==
- Southeast Asian Games in the Philippines:
  - 1981 Southeast Asian Games in Manila
  - 1991 Southeast Asian Games in Manila
  - 2005 Southeast Asian Games in Manila
- 2020 ASEAN Para Games (cancelled)

== Notes ==
Preceded by Kuala Lumpur	Southeast Asian Games; Philippines; XXX Southeast Asian Games (2019)	Succeeded by Vietnam
