= 2019 SEA Games closing ceremony =

2019 Southeast Asian Games Closing Ceremony
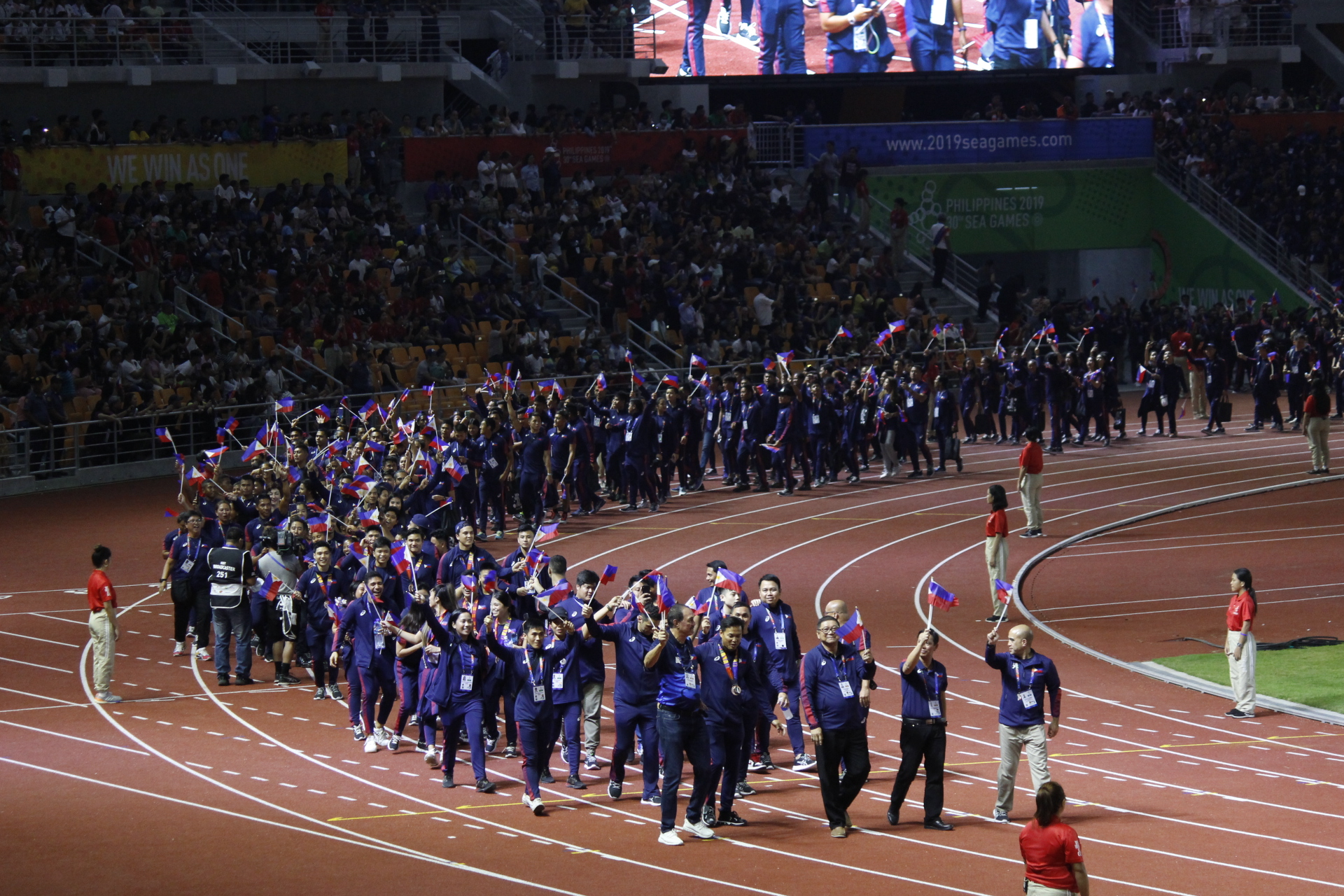
- The Philippine delegation entering the stadium
- Date: 11 December 2019; 6 years ago
- Time: 17:45 - 20:45 PHT (UTC+08:00) (3 hours)
- Location: New Clark City Athletics Stadium, New Clark City, Capas, Tarlac
- Filmed by: NEP
- Footage: THE 30TH SOUTH EAST ASIAN GAMES CLOSING CEREMONY 2019 on YouTube

The closing ceremony of the 2019 Southeast Asian Games took place on the evening of Wednesday 11 December 2019 at the New Clark City Athletics Stadium, in New Clark City, Capas, Tarlac.

During the closing ceremony, the Philippines formally handed over the hosting duties of the Southeast Asian Games to Hanoi, Vietnam, the host city of the 2021 Southeast Asian Games.

== Venue ==
The New Clark City Athletics Stadium hosted the closing ceremonies. The Athletics Stadium itself had its design was derived from Mount Pinatubo, with its posts and facade made from lahar or volcanic debris from the volcano. Its ringed roofline was made to resemble a crater and be defined by a series of curving canopies. The main facade or the main entrance was ornated with glassframes. and its pillars are painted orange to represent the local sunset. The pillars, inspired from the framework of the parol, supports the seating structure of the stadium as well as its roofing.

== Proceedings ==
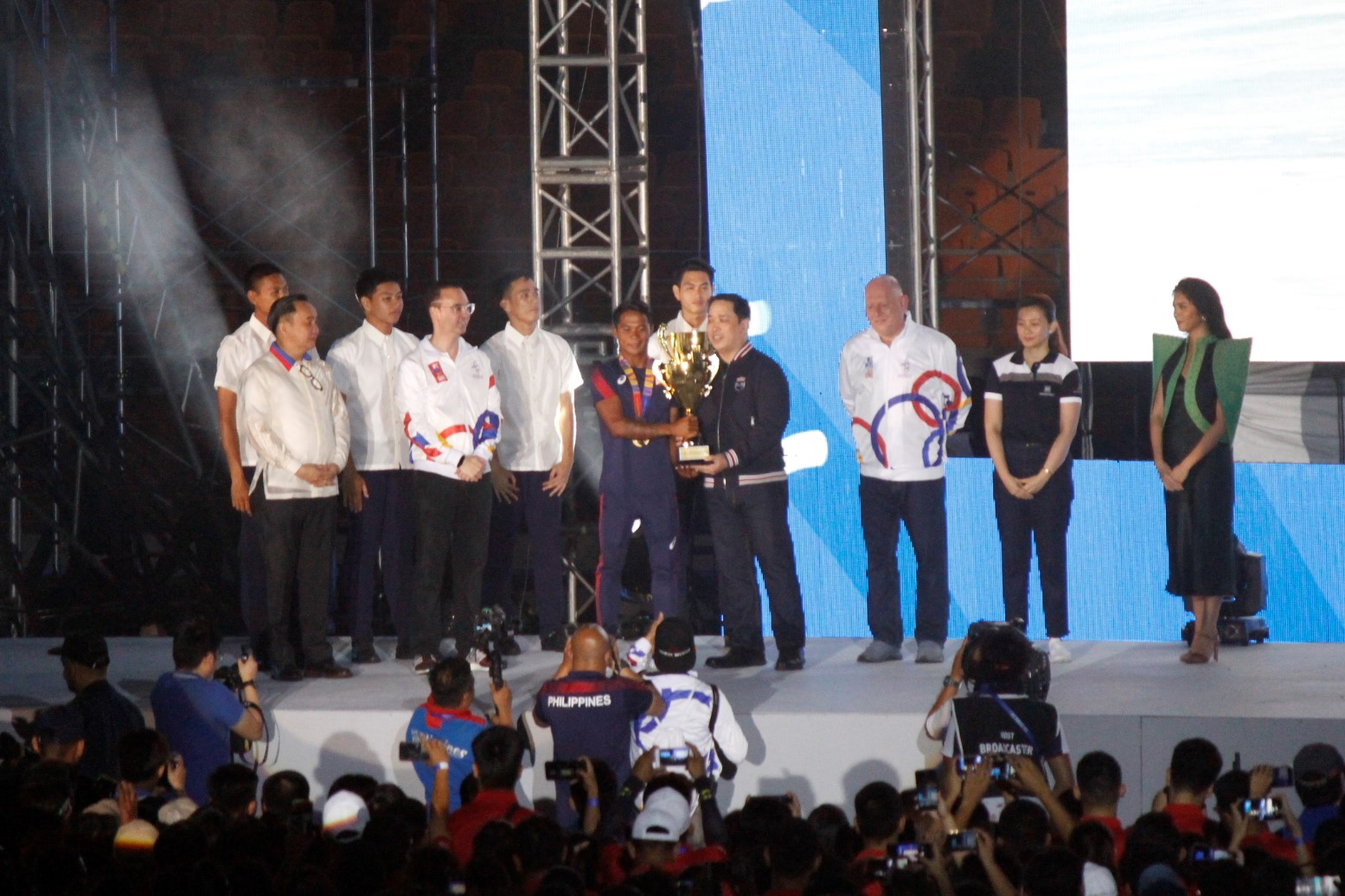
Roger Casugay being recognized as the "Fair Play Athlete."

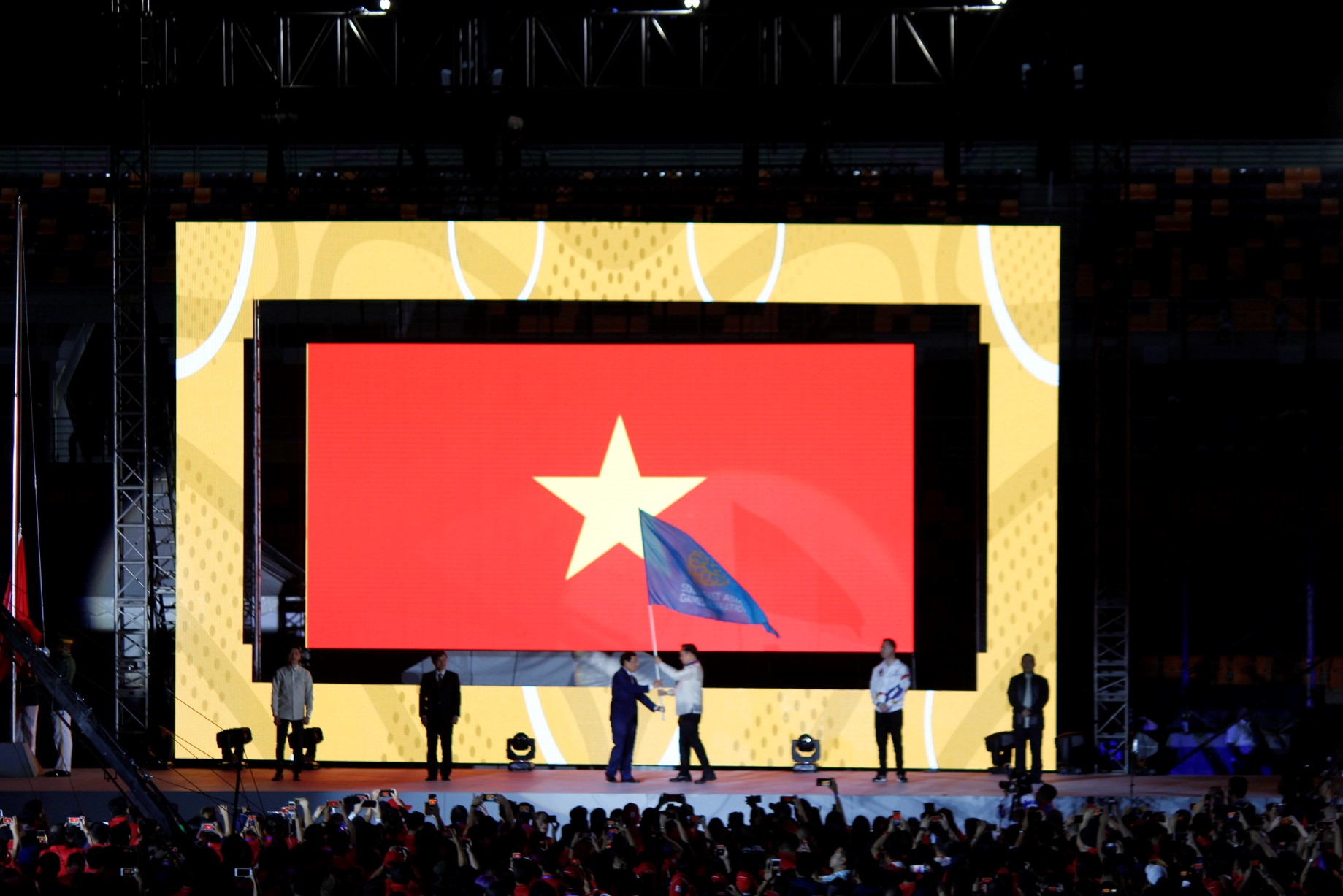
The handover of the Southeast Asian Games Federation flag.

The pre-show consisted of performances from the Aeta Festival Dancers of Porac and the Manila Concert Choir.

The main program began with Journey lead vocalist Arnel Pineda singing the Philippine National Anthem. This was followed by the Parade of Flags and Athletes. The arches and the background music that were used in the Parade of Nations during the opening ceremony were utilized. The music video of "Who We Are", sung by Sarah Geronimo, was shown as a tribute to the workforce and volunteers, who then entered the stadium to join the athletes and officials after the video was shown. After which, Arnel Pineda and the KO Jones band performed several songs. The ceremony also featured a drone show, forming different symbols and sports, such as athletics, aquatics, and gymnastics, as well as the official SEA Games logo and slogan.

Speaker of the House of Representatives of the Philippines and Philippine Southeast Asian Games Organizing Committee (PHISGOC) chairman Alan Peter Cayetano, Philippine Olympic Committee President Abraham Tolentino, Head of Megaworld Lifestyle Malls Graham M. Coates, and Chief Integrated Marketing Officer of Resorts World Manila Martin Paz, presented awards for the biennial meet. Winning six golds and two silver medals, Quah Zheng Wen of Singapore was awarded the Most Valuable Player (MVP) award for male athletes, while Nguyễn Thị Ánh Viên of Vietnam, who also won six golds and two silvers, was accorded MVP honors for female athletes. Roger Casugay of the Philippines was recognized as the "Fair Play Athlete" of the 2019 SEA Games, after his heroic act of helping Indonesian surfer Arip Nurhidayat, whose board was thrown up in the air from the force of the waves during the Surfing competitions. With a total of 387 medals, 149 of which are gold medals, the Philippines was accorded the overall championship of the biennial meet. The country placed 1st again in the medal tally with 149 gold medals and 36 higher than the 23rd SEA Games in 2005 wherein the Philippines also hosted and placed 1st. The host Philippines emerged in the medal tally as the overall champion for the first time in 14 years breaking its own medal count record in 2005.

After formal speeches from Cayetano and Tolentino, Executive Secretary of the Philippines Salvador Medialdea declared the games closed and the extinguishing of the flame then followed.

After which, a video featuring the highlights of the biennial meet was shown, with the official SEA Games theme song "We Win As One", being played.

The Southeast Asian Games Federation flag was handed over from the Philippine Southeast Asian Games Organizing Committee (PHISGOC) chairman Alan Peter Cayetano and Philippine Olympic Committee President Abraham Tolentino to Nguyễn Ngọc Thiện, Minister of Culture, Sports and Tourism and Vietnam Olympic Committee President, and Ngô Văn Quý, Vice Chairman of the Hanoi People's Committee. The National Anthem of Vietnam, Tiến Quân Ca, was played and the flag of Vietnam was raised, symbolizing the hosting responsibilities being passed to Vietnam. A 12-minute presentation showcasing Vietnamese culture was delivered. The presentation showcased what the athletes can expect in the 2021 SEA Games. This was followed by a fireworks display in the stadium.

The ceremony concluded with the Black Eyed Peas performing 10 songs.

== Performers ==
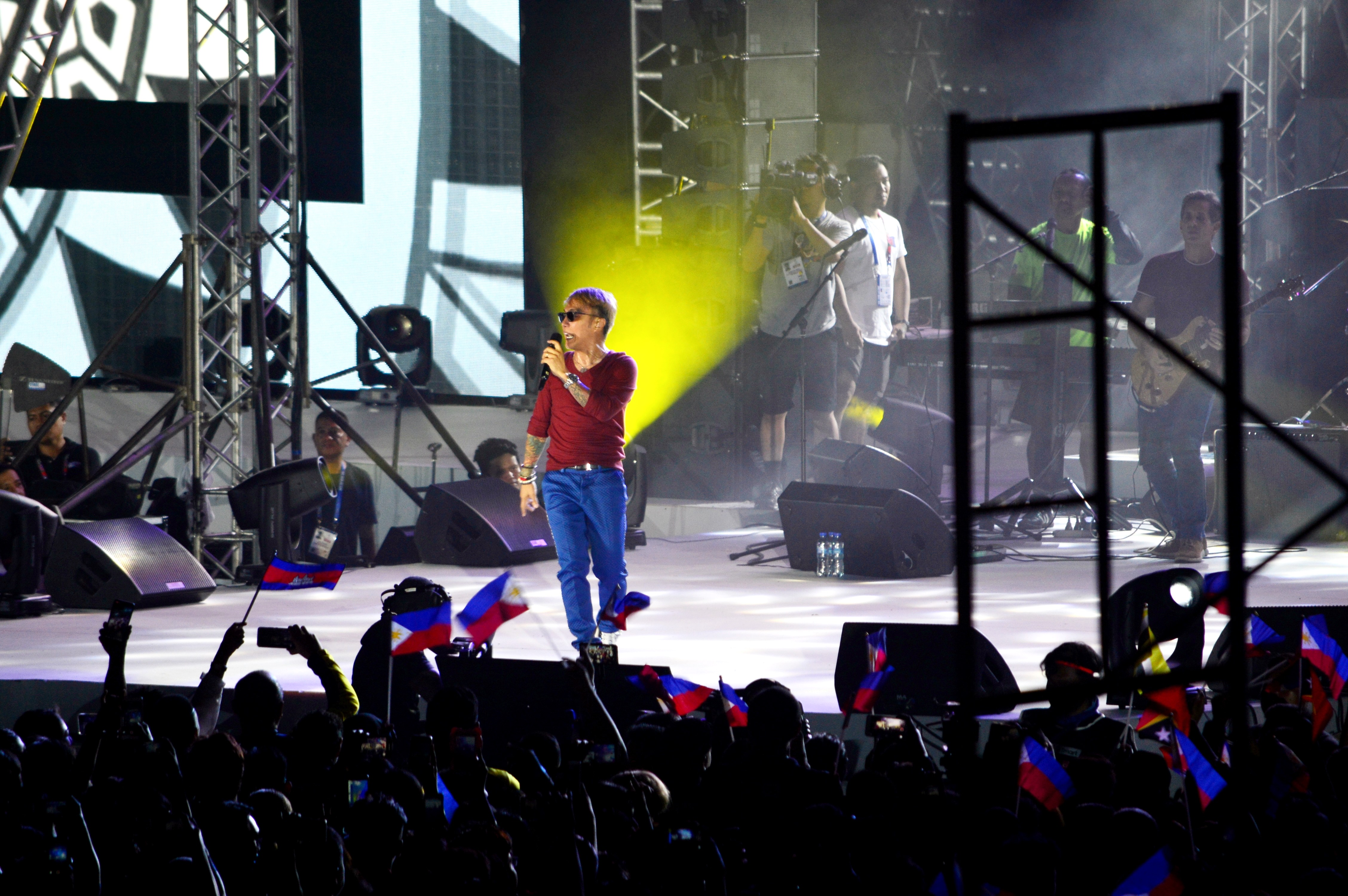
Arnel Pineda and the KO Jones band.

- Arnel Pineda and KO Jones band (performing "Rock the SEA Games", "Don't Stop Believin'", "Livin' on a Prayer", "Sweet Child o' Mine", "We Will Rock You", and "We Are the Champions")
- The Black Eyed Peas (performing "Let's Get It Started", "Boom Boom Pow", "Pump It", an instrumental part of "Seven Nation Army", "Ritmo (Bad Boys for Life)", "Just Can't Get Enough", "Bebot", "The APL Song", "The Time (Dirty Bit)", "Where Is the Love?", and "I Gotta Feeling")

== Anthems ==
- (Philippines) Lupang Hinirang
- (Vietnam) Tiến Quân Ca

== Notable guests ==
- Salvador Medialdea, Executive Secretary of the Philippines
- Alan Peter Cayetano, Speaker of the House of Representatives of the Philippines and Philippine Southeast Asian Games Organizing Committee (PHISGOC)
- Abraham Tolentino, Member of the Philippine House of Representatives from the 8th District of Cavite and president of the Philippine Olympic Committee
- William Ramirez, chairman of the Philippine Sports Commission

=== Foreign dignitaries ===
- Nguyễn Ngọc Thiện, Minister of Culture, Sports and Tourism of Vietnam and President of the Vietnam Olympic Committee
- Ngô Văn Quý, Vice-Chairman of the Hanoi People's Committee
