= Bayanihan Park =

Park in Angeles City, Philippines

- The Salakot Arch at Bayanihan Park
- Interactive map of Bayanihan Park
- Location: Clark Freeport Zone, Angeles City, Philippines
- Coordinates: 15.168459°N 120.586597°E
- Area: 7.5 ha (19 acres)

Bayanihan Park is a park in Clark Freeport Zone, Angeles City, Philippines.

== Background ==
Bayanihan Park is geographically located in the city of Angeles, Philippines. While the park is situated outside the physical gates of the Clark Freeport and Special Economic Zone, the park itself covering an area of 7.5 ha (19 acres) is declared as part of the freeport zone as per Republic Act No. 9400.

It is formerly known as Astro Park. One of the major landmarks of the city of Angeles, the Salakot Arch, is situated inside the park. The structure's roof resembles that of a salakot, a traditional hat. It was built during the administration of then-President Ferdinand Marcos to commemorate the revision of the Military Bases Agreement between the Philippine and United States government in 1979. The deal recognized Philippine sovereignty over the Clark Air Base which was then controlled by the United States. The Salakot Arch was formerly situated inside the Clark Air Base (which was later converted to the Clark Freeport Zone) but was later relocated inside the park. The park was renamed as the Bayanihan Park when the Clark Airbase was converted to a Philippine-controlled base.

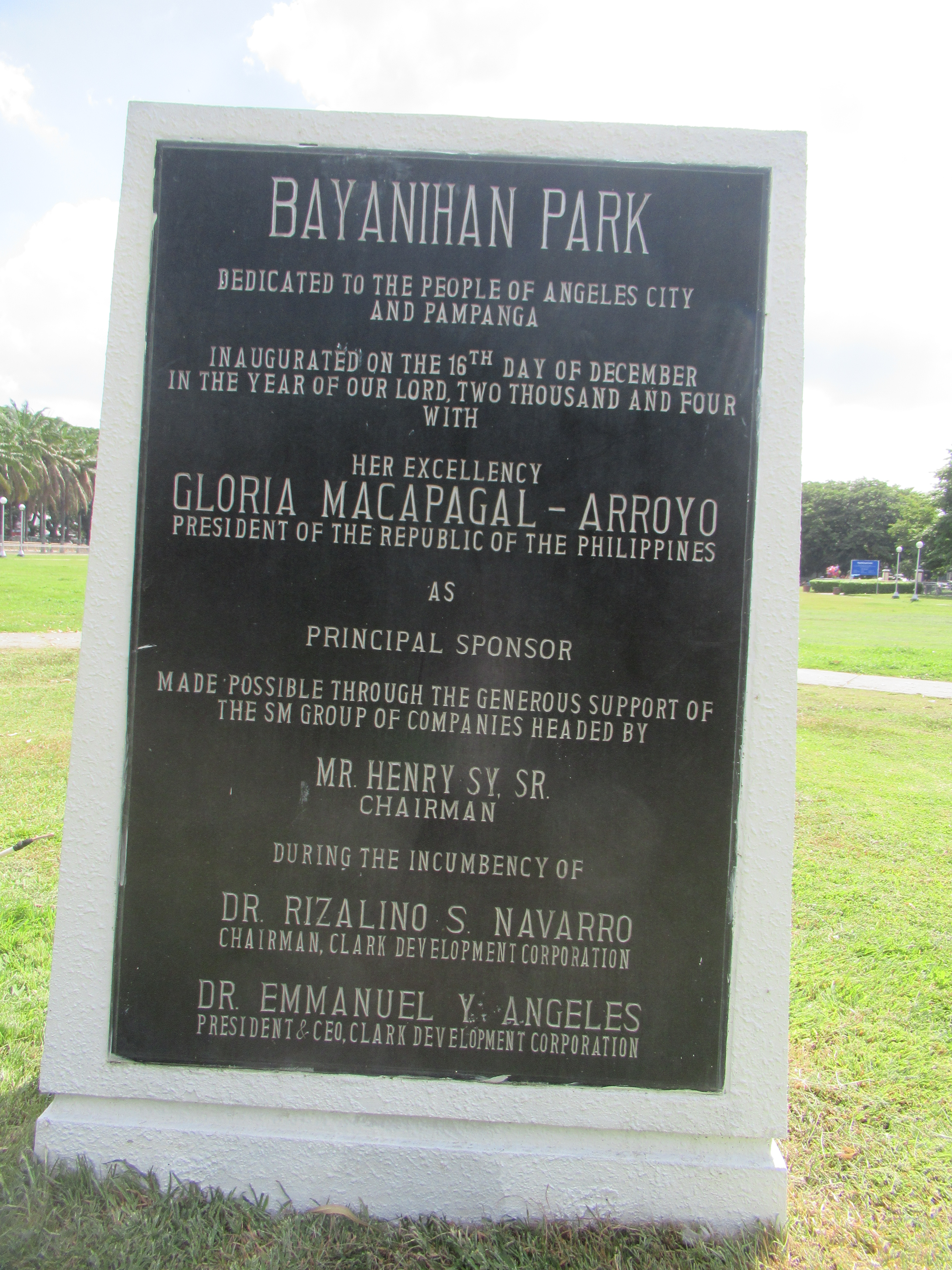
Historical marker monument

The park serves as an area for recreational and sports activities and hosts basketball and volleyball courts.

In November 30, 2018, the park serves as the venue for the countdown ceremony of the 2019 Southeast Asian Games. A 15 m (49 ft) structure consisting of 11 rings representing the 11 participating countries were also built inside the park grounds for the countdown ceremony.
