= NEP Group =

American broadcast production company

NEP Group, Inc.
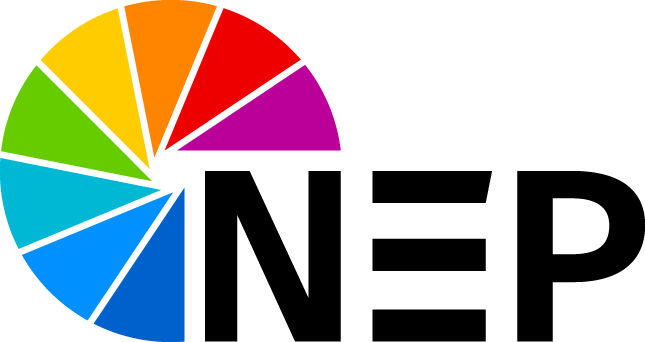
- Type: Private
- Industry: Video production, broadcasting services
- Founded: 1984; 42 years ago, in Scranton, Pennsylvania, United States
- Founder: Tom Shelburne
- Headquarters: Pittsburgh, Pennsylvania, United States
- Area served: Worldwide
- Key people: Martin Stewart (CEO) Julie Bellani (Chief Human Resources Officer) Deborah Honkus (chair)
- Services: Outside broadcasting Television studios System Integration; ENG; Master Control; Wireless Broadcast; Webcast; Visual Effects; Audio Production; Post-production; LED screens
- Owner: 26North Partners
- Number of employees: 4,000+
- Website: nepgroup.com

NEP Group, Inc. also known as NEP Supershooters LP (formerly NEP Broadcasting LLC) is a Pittsburgh, Pennsylvania based and privately owned international production company that provides outsourced teleproduction services for major events throughout the world.

Its facilities are used to produce television broadcasts of the Indian Premier League, Cricket World Cup, Super Bowl, Academy Awards, Premier League, Eurovision Song Contest, Emmy Awards, The Daily Show, UEFA Champions League, Olympic Games, NASCAR, Asian Games, WWE Wrestling, FIFA World Cup, Wimbledon and French Open, Grammy Awards, U.S. Open, British Open, The People's Court, Sesame Street, The Rolling Stones, Page Six TV and Love Island (franchise).

== History ==
The company was founded by Tom Shelburne in 1984 and was part of Scranton, Pennsylvania television station WNEP-TV (which stood for North East Productions/Pennsylvania). It was spun off after The New York Times Company bought the station in 1986 from Shelburne. The company took off after it acquired the failing New Kensington, Pennsylvania-based TCS after the companies jointly produced the 1987 Pan American Games in Indianapolis, Indiana.

From 2007 to 2012 it was primarily owned by American Securities. In 2012 it NEP was sold to Crestview Partners.

On September 25, 2015, NEP appointed Keith Andrews (formerly CEO and managing director of NEP Australia) as Chief Operations officer of NEP Group, Inc.

On June 24, 2016, The Carlyle Group made a significant minority investment in NEP alongside existing shareholders Crestview and NEP management.

In August 2018, it was announced that Crestview were to exit NEP with The Carlyle Group purchasing their stake, giving them a majority interest as of October 19, 2018.

In August 2020, NEP Group announced that Brian Sullivan will join the company as the new CEO starting August 31.

== Acquisitions ==
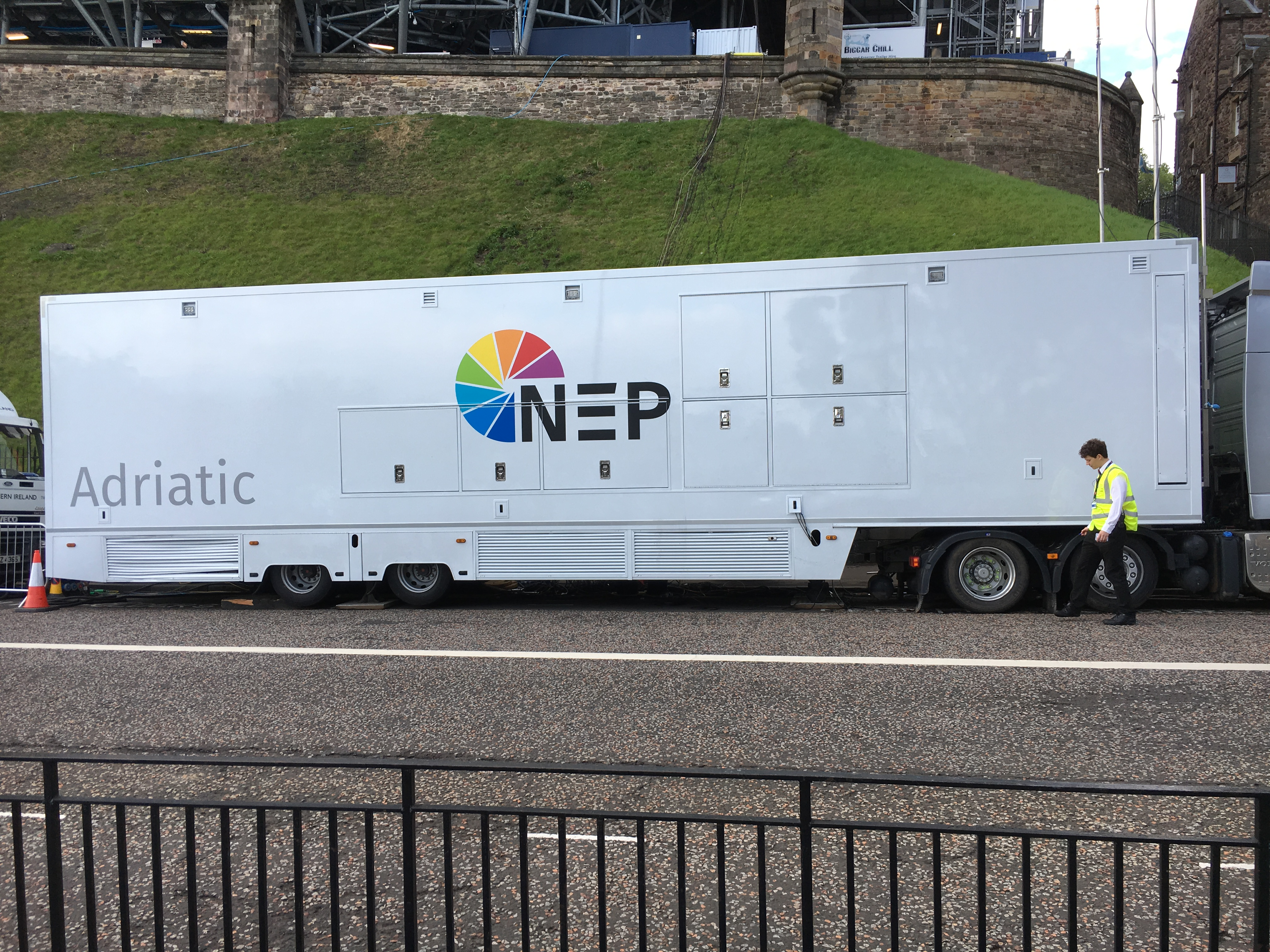
NEP UK's Adriatic OB vehicle

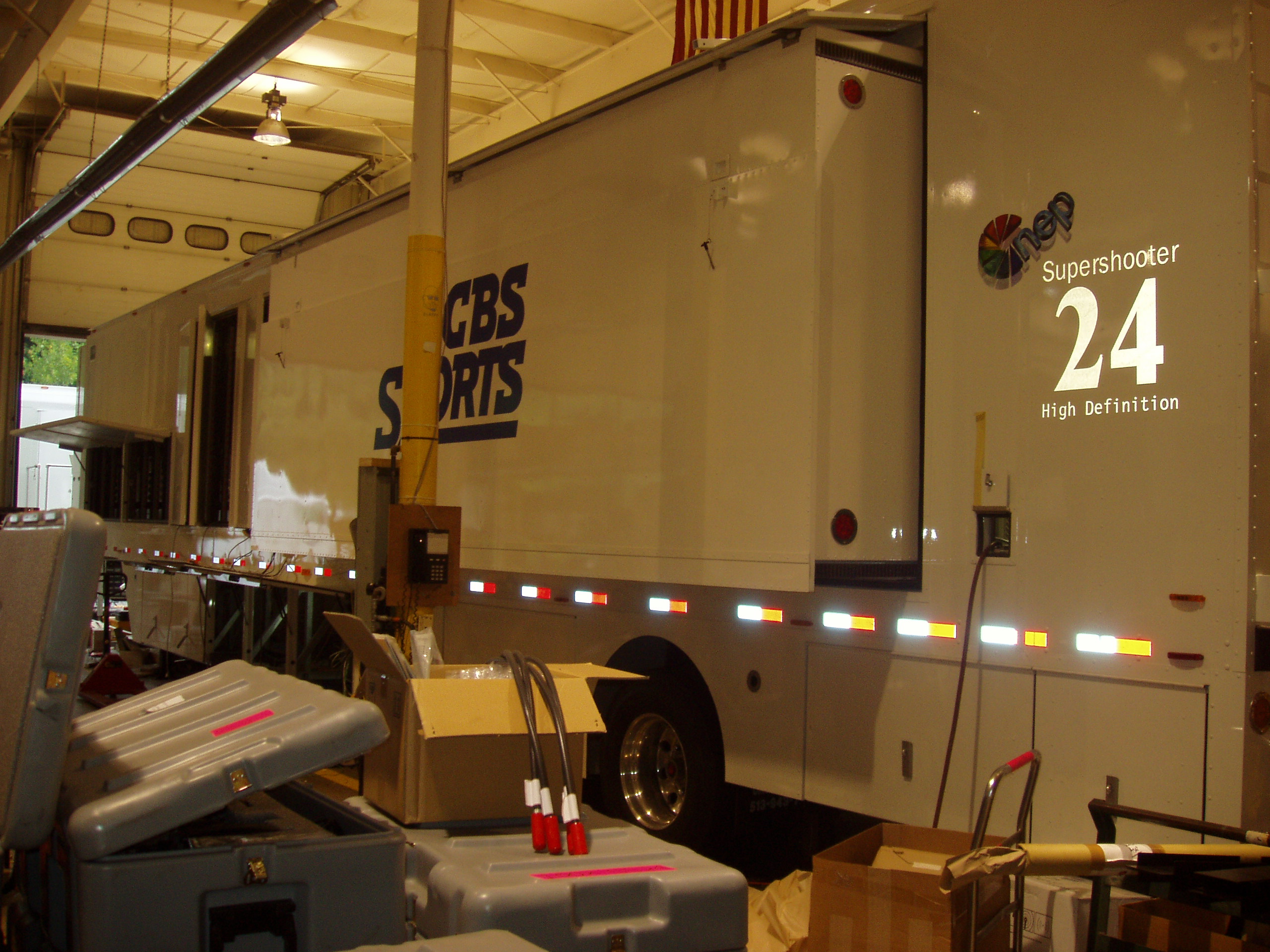
NEP Supershooter SS24 under construction

This list of acquisitions is not complete.

Acquisition date	Company	Facilities	Country	References
January 5, 2005	NMT: National Mobile Television	Outside broadcasting	US	
January 31, 2005	Visions	Outside broadcasting	UK	
April 12, 2006	Roll to Record	Outside broadcasting	UK	
January 9, 2008	NCP: New Century Productions	Outside broadcasting	US	
March 22, 2012	Trio Video	Outside broadcasting	US	
May 2, 2012	Bow Tie Television	Managed service provider (capture, broadcast, stream, archive) for Parliaments and Government Authorities in the UK	UK	
November 20, 2012	Corplex	Outside broadcasting	US	
January 24, 2014	Global Television	9 outside broadcasting trucks and flyaway units, studio production, host broadcasting	AUS	
September 2, 2014	MIRA Mobile Television	Outside broadcasting	US	
December 22, 2014	Faber Audiovisuals	Video display, audiovisual rental & operation	NLD	
January 31, 2015	Screen Scene Group	Outside broadcasting, post-production, VFX, audio production	IRE	
March 26, 2015	Mediatec Group	Outside broadcasting, studio production, video display, master control, post-production, wireless, AV integration	SWE	
April 30, 2015	Outside Broadcast	Outside broadcasting, studio production, ENG, post-production, audio. Now branded as NEP Belgium.	BEL	
July 10, 2015	Consolidated Media Industries	Outside broadcasting, studio production, post-production, audio production, master control, wireless, event management, VFX, ENG, streaming, live playout. Now branded as NEP The Netherlands.	NLD	
December 23, 2015	Mediatec Asia Pacific	Audiovisual solutions provider for event and television productions	AUS	
June 17, 2016	Broadcast Solutions Group	Provider of outside broadcast flypacks	SGP	
July 14, 2016	DBlux	Outside broadcasting, sound, lighting and audiovisual production	DEN	
January 4, 2017	Creative Technology Ltd	Outside broadcasting and live events services	UK	
August 2, 2017	Bexel Global Broadcast Solutions	Outsourced broadcast solutions and flypacks	US	
April 17, 2018	NZ Live	Independent playout, outside broadcast and studio provider	NZ	
June 15, 2018	Telerecord	Outside broadcasting solutions across southern Europe	ITA	
July 11, 2018	Big Picture	Video production and equipment for concert tours, music festivals, broadcast, corporate and special events	AUS/NZ	
October 1, 2018	Fletcher Group	Ultra-slow motion and robotic camera specialist	US	
October 9, 2018	SIS Live	Global connectivity services, uplink vehicles and operations centres	UK	
February 5, 2019	Facility House Broadcast Group	ENG, OB and post-production services	NLD	
September 9, 2019	Aerial Video Systems	Wireless camera technology, aerial production and RF control	US / UK	
October 15, 2019	SOS Global Express	Logistics and freight forwarding	US	
October 17, 2019	HDR Group	Full-service production partner with studios, outside broadcast, post-production etc.	SWE	
August 12, 2020	Outside Broadcasting	Outside-broadcast provider with 6 trucks, formerly part of Sky New Zealand. Merged with NEP New Zealand. Offer was completed on 5 February 2021. NEP acquired the following vehicles from OSB along with its two original OB units: HD1 and HD3: 14.3m semi-trailer production unit with expanding side, capable of holding 20+ cameras. They are supporter by tender vehicles. HD1 is based in Christchurch.; HD2: 14.3m semi-trailer production unit with the capability of holding up to 16+ cameras. It is supported by a tender vehicle with extra production facilities. This unit is based in Wellington.; HD4: 15m semi-trailer production unit with the capability of using 16+ cameras. It too is supported by a tender vehicle with additional production space.; HD5: 12.5m rigid truck and can input 8+ cameras supported by a similar sized tender vehicle with additional production room.; HD6: Small van which is capable of 6+ cameras. It is supported by a similar sized van for storage and linking; AUX1: Was an original outside broadcast production unit (OSB1), however it has been converted into a specialised production trailer (not a stand-alone OB trailer) for specialty cameras, additional graphics and houses any overflow production areas for larger broadcasts; OSB2: An original standard definition 13.5m semi-trailer production unit capable of 14+ cameras. This is supported by a tender truck with additional production space.; HD/SD Fly Away kits: Suitable for broadcasts overseas; HD11: Rigid truck with auxiliary unit. This was in the existing NEP NZ fleet; HD12: Small OB van and auxiliary van which were part of the existing NEP NZ fleet.; NEP has added a larger OB unit 'Tahi' to its fleet in 2024 with a double expanding side. Its tender is a large trailer.; Tui, a trailer, was added to provide smaller broadcasts that required remote production.	NZ	
March 1, 2021	Vista Worldlink	Centralized live television production	US	
