= Diver organisations =

Membership organisations of underwater divers

Diver organisations are membership based organisations where the membership is wholly, or at least in large part, underwater divers, and the organisation is intended to further a mutual interest related to underwater diving or the aquatic environment as it affects divers or diving activity. Some organisations have more than one focus of interest.

== Freediving ==
- AIDA International (AIDA) – Worldwide rule- and record-keeping body for competitive breath-hold events
- AIDA Hellas – National representative of AIDA International in Greece
- British Freediving Association (BFA) – British affiliate to AIDA International
- Confédération Mondiale des Activités Subaquatiques (CMAS) – International organisation for underwater activities

== Recreational and technical scuba ==
- British Sub-Aqua Club (BSAC) – UK governing body of recreational diving
- Cave Divers Association of Australia (CDAA) – Australian cave diving organisation
- Cave Diving Group (CDG) – UK based cave diver training and certification agency
- Comhairle Fo-Thuinn (CFT) – Governing body for recreational diving and underwater hockey in Ireland
- Confédération Mondiale des Activités Subaquatiques (CMAS) – International organisation for underwater activities
- Federación Española de Actividades Subacuáticas (FEDAS) – Spanish national federation for underwater activities, affiliated to CMAS
- Fédération Française d'Études et de Sports Sous-Marins (FFESSM) – French diver training and certification agency
- International Association for Handicapped Divers (IAHD) – Non-profit organisation based in the Netherlands
- National Association for Cave Diving (NACD) – American non-profit organization for improving cave diving safety
- Woodville Karst Plain Project (WKPP) – Project and organization to map the underwater cave systems of the Woodville Karst Plain

== Scientific, archeological and historical ==
- Historical Diving Society
- Nautical Archaeology Society (NAS) – British organisation to further research in nautical archaeology for the public benefit
- Save Ontario Shipwrecks (SOS) – Provincial heritage NGO in Ontario, Canada
- Sea Research Society – American nonprofit for marine research

== Underwater sports ==
- Australian Underwater Federation (AUF) – Governing body for underwater sports
- British Octopush Association (BOA) – National body for underwater hockey in the United Kingdom
- British Underwater Sports Association (BUSA) – National sporting association
- Federación Española de Actividades Subacuáticas (FEDAS) – Spanish national federation for underwater activities, affiliated to CMAS
- Fédération Française d'Études et de Sports Sous-Marins (FFESSM) – French diver training and certification agency
- South African Underwater Sports Federation (SAUSF) – Sports governing body in South Africa
- Türkiye Sualtı Sporları Federasyonu (TSSF) – Turkish national governing body for underwater sport and lifesaving
- Underwater Society of America (USOA) – American national representative organization for underwater sport

== Other ==
- Artificial Reef Society of British Columbia (ARSBC) – Canadian non-profit to create artificial reefs for habitat enhancement and recreation
- Divers Alert Network (DAN) – Group for improving diving safety
- Green Fins – Coral reef conservation charity
