= CMAS** scuba diver =

Autonomous recreational scuba diving certification

CMAS two-star scuba diver (also known as CMAS P2 diver, CMAS** diver, or just CMAS**) is a diving certification for recreational scuba diving issued by the Confédération Mondiale des Activités Subaquatiques (CMAS).

It indicates that the diver has been assessed as competent to plan and undertake dives to a maximum depth of 30 metres, or with some additional experience, 40 meters, accompanied by another diver with a recognised equivalent or higher certification, with no requirement for a dive leader.

== Equivalent certifications ==
The Confédération mondiale des activités subaquatiques (world underwater federation) was created in 1959 to bring consistency between different national diving certification systems.

As a result, the CMAS two-star diver certification is usually delivered as an equivalence to a national two-star diver certification delivered through a federation affiliated to the CMAS Technical Committee.

CMAS two-star diver national equivalent certifications
Country	Affiliated federation	Equivalent certification
France	FFESSM	Level-2 diver ("plongeur niveau 2")
France	FSGT	Level-2 diver ("plongeur niveau 2")
Belgium	FEBRAS (LIFRAS and NELOS)	Level-2 diver
Spain	FEDAS	Level-2 diver
UK	SAA	Club Diver (with 10 additional dives); Dive Leader
