= British Underwater Sports Association =

National sporting association

- Abbreviation: BUSA
- Formation: 1997
- Type: NGO
- Purpose: International representation
- Headquarters: United Kingdom
- Region served: United Kingdom
- President: Ken Kirby
- Affiliations: CMAS; CMAS Europe

British Underwater Sports Association (BUSA) is the British affiliate of the Sports Committee of Confédération Mondiale des Activités Subaquatiques (CMAS).

It was created in 1997 to fill the vacancy on the CMAS Sport Committee for the United Kingdom caused by the expulsion of the British Sub-Aqua Club from CMAS in order to ensure ongoing access to international competition offered by CMAS for British underwater sports teams.

Its members include the British Finswimming Association, British Octopush Association and British Spearfishing Association.

Its role is exclusively one of representation of British underwater sports at the international level. It does not have any recognition from the British government or the governments of the four constituent countries of the UK. BUSA members seeking government funding for sporting activities are required to obtain a letter of support from the National Governing Body (NGB) for Sub Aqua in their country. These include the BSAC for the UK and England, Northern Ireland Federation of Sub-Aqua Clubs for Northern Ireland, the Scottish Sub Aqua Club for Scotland and the Welsh Association of Sub Aqua Clubs for Wales. However, in June 2013, UK Sport and Sport England reportedly published their requirements for the acceptance of BUSA as the NGB for underwater sports in the UK.

== See also ==
- Sub-Aqua Association – British recreational diver training and certification organisation
- Finswimming in the United Kingdom – Competitive watersport
