= Nederlandse Onderwatersport Bond =

Dutch governing body for underwater sports

Nederlandse Onderwatersport Bond Dutch/Netherlands underwater sports association/federation/union
- Abbreviation: NOB
- Formation: 1962
- Type: NGO
- Purpose: Underwater Sports & Sciences and diver training
- Headquarters: Netherlands
- Location: Landjuweel 62, Veenendaal, Utrecht
- Region served: Netherlands
- Members: 16,000 members (including 2100 instructors)
- Official language: Dutch
- Affiliations: CMAS; CMAS Europe; EUF
- Website: http://www.onderwatersport.org/

The Nederlandse Onderwatersport Bond, (NOB) is the national governing body for recreational diving and underwater sports in the Netherlands. It was founded in 1962. In 2008 there were 290 scuba diving clubs and schools with a total of 20.000 members. The NOB is a member of CMAS Confédération Mondiale des Activités Subaquatiques. The aim of the NOB is to develop recreational scuba diving in the Netherlands.

== Underwater sport ==
NOB supports competition at all levels for the following underwater sports: finswimming and underwater hockey.

== Qualifications ==
The NOB offers training with particular attention to the difficult dive conditions encountered in the Netherlands (currents, limited visibility, cold water).

=== Youth program ===
- ScubaDoe - (Snorkeling & scubadiving, 8–14 years old)
- 1*-Junior Duiker - Junior Open Water Diver (min. 12 years old, autonomy at 10 meters)

=== Diving skills certification ===
- 1*-Duiker - Open Water Diver (min 14 years old, autonomy at 20 meters)
- 2*-Duiker - Advanced Open Water Diver (min 15 years old, autonomy at 30 meters)
- 3*-Duiker - Dive Master and Rescue Diver/Oxygen Provider (min 18 years old: assistant, dive leader, diving officer for fun dives autonomy at 50 meters)
- 4*-Duiker - Master Scuba Diver (3*-Duiker with 250 certified dives and 6 specialties)

=== Specialty training ===
Prerequisite: 1 star diver

- Underwater biology
- Nitrox basics (#)
- Digital photography
- Dry suit
- Rescue (pre-requisite for the 3 star diver. Same as RIFA Plongée of FFESSM)

Prerequisite: 2 star diver

- Full-face mask (#)
- Underwater orientation
- Wreck diving (#)
- Drift diving
- Ice diving (#)
- Search and recovery

Prerequisite: 3 star diver

- Decompression (#)
- Advanced Nitrox (#)
- Cave-diving techniques (#)

(#) Those specialties are validated by 2* instructors (minimum) who followed an additional instructor course. Other specialties by any 2*-instructor (minimum) having self the specialty as a diver.

(##) Maximum 20 minutes decompression stops; maximal depth 50 meters.

=== Leadership courses ===
- 1*-Instructeur - Assistant Instructor: certifies 1* divers (confined water), and assists 2* instructors
- 2*-Instructeur - Instructor: certifies 1*-4* divers and provides specialty courses (confined and open water).
- 3* -Instructeur - Master-Instructor or Regional instructor: trains instructors (1*-2*) under the supervision of a Docent.
- Instructeur-trainer - Instructor-trainer: trains instructors (1*-2*) under the supervision of a Docent.
- Docent - Instructor certifier or National instructor: trains and certifies any level of diver and instructor.

The Docent and Master-Instructor are the two highest levels of instructors within the NOB. They lead commissions, speak on behalf of the NOB when required, etc. Given the stringent selection process, based upon application and approval from the board of directors, very few NOB instructors reach this level of certification.

=== Compliance with European Standards ===
The NOB obtained CEN certification from the EUF certification body in 2008 for the following diver and instructor grades:

- 1*-Duiker -> EN-14153-2: Autonomous Diver
- 2*-Duiker -> EN-14153-2: Autonomous Diver
- 3*-Duiker -> EN-14153-3: Dive Leader
- 1*-Assistant Instructeur -> EN-14413-1: Scuba Instructor Level 1
- 2*-Instructeur -> EN-14413-2: Scuba Instructor Level 2
