= CMAS* scuba diver =

Entry level recreational diving certification from CMAS

CMAS one-star scuba diver (also known as CMAS * diver, or just CMAS *) is the entry-level diving certification for recreational scuba diving issued by the Confédération Mondiale des Activités Subaquatiques (CMAS).

The training programme enables divers to undertake accompanied no-decompression dives to a maximum depth of 20 meters in open water. Other countries affiliated to CMAS may allow higher limits (for example, the Irish Underwater Council certifies a CMAS * diver to dive to 25m or 30m depending on the dive buddy, both at home and abroad).

== Principle ==
In the CMAS International Diver Training Standards and Procedures Manual, CMAS states that "A one-star diver shall be deemed to have sufficient knowledge, skill and experience to procure air, equipment, and other diving services and to plan, conduct, and log open-water dives that do not require mandatory in-water decompression stops, without the supervision of a CMAS instructor or CMAS dive leader, when properly equipped and accompanied by another certified diver of at least the same level, provided the diving activities undertaken, the diving conditions and the diving area are similar, equal or better to those in which training was received."

== Prerogatives ==
CMAS one-star scuba divers can undertake accompanied no-decompression dives to a maximum depth of 20 meters in open water.

== Equivalent certifications ==
The CMAS certification system

The Confédération mondiale des activités subaquatiques (world underwater federation) was created in 1959 to bring consistency between different national diving certification systems.

As a result, the CMAS one-star diver certification is usually delivered as an equivalence to a national one-star diver certification delivered through a federation affiliated to the CMAS Technical Committee.

CMAS one-star diver national equivalent certifications
Country	Affiliated organisation	Equivalent certification
France	FFESSM	Level-1 diver ("plongeur niveau 1")
Belgium	Royal Belgian Diving Federation (BEFOS-FEBRAS)	Level-1 diver
Spain	FEDAS	Level-1 diver
Great Britain	Sub-Aqua Association	Open Water Diver

The CMAS one-star diver certification can also be delivered by specially accredited dive centers known as CMAS Dive Centers (CDC) who use dedicated CMAS training materials and who directly issue CMAS diving certificates.

== Course details ==
The course covers the following theory topics:

- the selection, purpose and function of diving equipment;
- the purpose and use of diving signals;
- diving physics;
- medical problems related to diving
- use of dive tables and dive computers
- the function and use of scuba equipment;
- the mechanisms of respiration and circulation;
- the use of buoyancy devices;
- comparison and selection of diving suits and ancillary equipment;
- methods for care and maintenance of equipment;
- accident prevention, self-rescue and buddy rescue – including theory of emergency ascent, towing, expired air ventilation and cardio-pulmonary resuscitation;
- diving procedures, the role of dive leader, importance of planning and preparation;
- selection of dive sites, the effect of weather and tides, hazards, importance of conservation;

and the following practical skills:

- snorkelling;
- assembly and fitting of scuba equipment;
- entry and exit;
- surface swimming with full scuba equipment (student shall be able to swim a distance of at least 50m);
- proper weighting, buoyancy;
- clearing and replacing mask and mouthpiece;
- out-of-air emergency procedures, using a secondary air supply;
- controlled buoyant lift;
- diver assistance techniques, towing and landing a casualty;
- employing expired air ventilation and cardio-pulmonary resuscitation.
- underwater removal and replacement of scuba and ballast systems
- simple under-water navigation

Following the training, five successful open water dives are required to complete the certification.

The course has the following minimum requirements:

- Theory lessons totalling 385 minutes;
- Practical lessons totalling 480 minutes;
- Five open water dives.

== Recommended curricula ==
Although the CMAS* Diver standard is a minimum requirement, individual CMAS Federations may recommend or require higher standards or extra coverage for their entry-level certification to suit local conditions and requirements. For example, the Sub-Aqua Association in the UK places extra emphasis on the theory and prevention of decompression sickness, diving from small boats and cold-water diving.
