= Underwater target shooting =

Underwater sport

- Highest governing body: CMAS
- First played: early 1980s, France

Characteristics
- Contact: No
- Team members: yes
- Mixed-sex: yes
- Type: Aquatic
- Equipment: diving mask, fins, snorkel, speargun
- Venue: swimming pool

Underwater target shooting is an underwater sport/shooting sport that tests a competitors’ ability to accurately use a speargun via a set of individual and team events conducted in a swimming pool using freediving or apnea technique. The sport was developed in France during the early 1980s and is currently practiced mainly in Europe. It is known as tir sur cible subaquatique in French and as tiro al blanco subacuático in Spanish.

== Competitor admission requirements ==
Competitors must be 18 years of age in order to participate in International events while National competitions in some countries such as France include age classifications for juniors and masters. The sport allows completion by both men and women. Individual events while conducted as mixed gender activities do have distinct men's and women's titles.

== Equipment ==
=== Personal ===
Each competitor is required to have the following equipment: diving mask, fins, snorkel, speargun, diving weighting system and an exposure suit such as a wetsuit. Use of the following equipment is permitted during the competition: replacement gun and replacement spear (including line), positioning items; any other equipment is not permitted. In lieu of supporting themselves with an arm on the pool bottom when shooting, competitors may provide or use a ballast device provided by the competition organisation. This may consist of a weight or a suction cup both fitted with a handle. While corrective lenses and contact lenses are permitted to be used, the use of aiming systems such as underwater torches, telescopic sights, laser sights and holographic weapon sights is forbidden.

=== Targets ===
A target consists of 33 cm (13 in) by 35 cm (13.8 in) panel whose centre is located 80 cm (31.5 in) above the pool bottom and is supported by a frame. The panel is made of a plastic foam sufficiently rigid enough to allow a spear to remain impaled. A target sheet is fixed to the face of the panel - the sheet for the individual events have 5 targets printed on it while the sheet for the team event has 9 targets laid out in 3 rows of 3 targets.

== Competition area ==
The sport is conducted in a swimming pool with a minimum pool size of 25 m (82 ft) x 10 m (33 ft), a depth between 1.8 m (6 ft) and 5.0 m (16 ft), and with a water temperature of 23 °C ±5 °C (73 °F ±9 °F). In absence of a suitable swimming pool, the French national rules permit the use of confined water sites containing non-moving water such as water-filled quarries.

The pool space divided up as follows. The targets are located about 1 to 1.5 m (3 to 5 ft), from the back wall of the pool and are centred 2.5 m (8 ft) apart to create a number of specific shooting ranges. The following lines are marked on the pool bottom - a line known as the shooting line is located 4 m (13 ft) from the face of the targets, a line known as the starting line is located 10 m (32 ft) from the shooting line and a line is located 3 m (10 ft) from the starting line to demarcate space for in-water preparation by competitors from the remainder of the pool which is used for warming up by competitors.

== Events ==
The sport currently has two individual events and one team event currently described in the International Rules. However, Fédération Française d'Études et de Sports Sous-Marins (FFESSM), has an additional individual event known as Super Biathlon or Great Biathlon described in its national rules.

=== Individual events ===
Precision (also called marksmanship) - the competitor dives at the starting line, swims underwater to the shooting line where he/she stops to obtain support from the pool bottom or from a ballasted object, fires at the target, swims to the target to retrieve the spear, surfaces, and swims back to the starting line whilst reloading the speargun. This cycle is repeated within a time frame of 5 minutes until 10 shots are fired, usually in 2 rounds of 5 to allow competition officials to replace the target sheet.

Biathlon is identical in conduct to that of the Precision event, however the competitor is required to return to the starting line after retrieving the spear before surfacing to take a breath. This cycle is repeated within a time frame of 2 minutes 30 seconds for men and 3 minutes for women until 5 shots are fired.

=== Team events ===
Relay is a team event is identical to the Biathlon event but is conducted with 2 or 3 competitors. Each competitor takes turns in firing at the target until 9 shots are fired within a time frame of 4 minutes 30 seconds.

== Governing body ==
The governing body is the Target Shooting Commission of the Confédération Mondiale des Activités Subaquatiques (CMAS) Sports Committee.

== Origins and history ==
The sport was developed in France during the early 1980s as part of a winter season training regime for spearfishing. In 1987, FFESSM created a commission to oversee the development and the administration of the new sport. The first French national championship was held in 1990 followed by European championships in 1998 and world championships in 1999.
