= Comhairle Fo-Thuinn =

Governing body for recreational diving and underwater hockey in Ireland

- Irish Underwater Council
- Abbreviation: CFT
- Formation: 1963
- Legal status: Guarantee Company Without Share Capital.
- Purpose: Recreational diving, diver training, underwater sports & sciences national governing body
- Headquarters: Dún Laoghaire, Ireland
- Location: 78A Patrick Street, Dún Laoghaire
- Region served: Ireland and Northern Ireland
- Members: 3000 member & 84 clubs (2004)
- Affiliations: CMAS; CMAS Europe; EUF
- Website: http://diving.ie/

Comhairle Fo-Thuinn (pronounced [ˈkoːɾˠl̠ʲə fˠɔˈhiːnʲ]; Irish for "Under-Wave Council"; CFT), also known as Irish Underwater Council (IUC) and trading as Diving Ireland, is the national governing body for recreational diving and underwater sports in Ireland.

== Organisation ==
CFT organises and promotes recreational scuba diving and snorkelling via a club system. It is administered by an executive committee is supported by the following four commissions: a Technical Commission which sets standards and tests for diving courses offered by its member clubs; a Medical Commission which advises on diving medical standards, treatment of diving medical conditions and monitors developments in hyperbaric medicine; a Sporting Commission which organises underwater sports, photography and an event known as the national gala; and a Scientific Commission which promotes underwater biology and archaeology. Its membership consists of both clubs and individuals which as of 2004 respectively totalled 3,000 and 84. While the majority of its activities are in the Republic of Ireland, a small number of members and clubs are located in Northern Ireland. It is incorporated as a Guarantee Company Without Share Capital under the name 'Comhairle Fo-Thuinn – Irish Underwater Council'.

== Recognition ==
CFT is recognised by the Irish Sports Council as the national governing body for recreational diving and underwater sports in the Republic of Ireland. It is the Irish representative to Confédération Mondiale des Activités Subaquatiques with affiliations to the Sports, Technical and Scientific Committees. It is also a member of CMAS Europe and the European Underwater Federation. CFT is both a supporter and a member of the National Steering Group of the Marine Conservation Society-co-ordinated Seasearch program which seeks to 'gather information on seabed habitats and associated marine wildlife in Britain and Ireland through the participation of volunteer recreational divers'.

== Underwater sports ==
As of October 2013, underwater hockey is the only underwater sport supported by CFT. The CFT oversees competition between clubs and the national team.

In the 2022 UWH Celtic Cup competition, the Irish A Team came 4th and the B Team finished 3rd.

== Qualifications ==
The CFT training program which is delivered by instructors based within its member clubs was structured as follows as of January 2013.

=== Snorkel grades ===
- Snorkel Skills One
- Snorkel Skills Two
- Snorkel Guide

=== Scuba diver grades ===
- Diver 1 Star
- Diver 2 Star
- Rescue Diver
- Leading Diver
- National Diver

=== Instructor grades ===
- Snorkel Instructor
- Instructor
- Examiner
- Leading Instructor
- National Instructor

=== Speciality grades ===
- Nitrox diver
- Diver First Responder
  (PHECC Cardiac First Responder)
- Diver Coxswain
- Advanced Nitrox Diver

=== Speciality grades ===
- Extended Range Diver
- Seasearch Diver
- Search & Recovery Diver
- Underwater Photographer Diver

=== CMAS equivalencies ===
The following equivalencies were those in place as of January 2013.

CMAS	CFT
CMAS 1 Star Diver	CFT Diver 1 Star
CMAS 2 Star Diver	CFT Diver 2 Star
CMAS 3 Star Diver	CFT Leading Diver
CMAS 4 Star Diver	CFT National Diver
CMAS 1 Star Instructor	CFT Instructor
CMAS 2 Star Instructor	CFT Examiner
CMAS 3 Star Instructor	CFT Leading Instructor
	CFT National Instructor

=== EUF certification ===
The CFT obtained CEN certification from the EUF certification body in 2006.

== See also ==
- Sport in Ireland
- Northern Ireland Federation of Sub-Aqua Clubs – National governing body for recreational diving and underwater sport in Northern Ireland
