= Sport diving (sport) =

Underwater sport using recreational open circuit scuba equipment in a swimming pool

Sport Diving
- Highest governing body: CMAS
- First played: Zaragoza, Spain, 2000.
- Registered players: 64 (international)(2011)

Characteristics
- Contact: no (except sharing air)
- Team members: individual and teams of 2 and 4
- Mixed-sex: yes
- Type: Aquatic
- Equipment: Diving mask, fins, scuba set
- Venue: Swimming pool

Sport diving is an underwater sport that uses recreational open circuit scuba diving equipment and consists of a set of individual and team events conducted in a swimming pool that test the competitors' competency in recreational scuba diving techniques. The sport was developed in Spain during the late 1990s and is currently played mainly in Europe. It is known as Plongée Sportive en Piscine in French and as Buceo De Competición in Spanish.

== Objectives ==
The international rules of competition contain the following four objectives for Sport Diving – firstly, encourage the further development of recreational scuba diving equipment and technique; secondly, promote scuba diving activities in localities that are remote from suitable diving sites or where open water activity may be prohibited by seasonal or adverse weather conditions; thirdly, to provide an opportunity for recreational scuba divers to practice and improve technique; and fourthly, the promotion of scuba diving carried out in swimming pools as a spectator sport for underwater diving enthusiasts.

== Equipment ==
Each competitor is required to have the following recreational diving equipment – a diving mask, fins, a snorkel, a buoyancy compensator, a diving weighting system that is independent of the buoyancy compensator, a diving regulator designed for open circuit scuba and fitted with both an alternative air source for use during the Obstacle Course event (refer below) and a submersible pressure gauge, a diving cylinder with an internal volume between 10 and 18 litres and filled with only breathing air of atmospheric origin, and an exposure suit such as a wetsuit or an isothermal garment such as a dry suit, and footwear such as wetsuit boots. Competitors will also be required to wear a swimming costume of the style used for competitive swimming. The use of the snorkel is usually compulsory for the Event M 300 metres (refer below) and optional in all other events.

Equipment as a diving watch or a diving computer is optional for a competitor to have as underwater timekeeping is carried out by competition officials. The requirements of laws and practices in force at the place of competition may modify or vary the above requirements, i.e. diving cylinder internal volume and pressure rating. Some events such as Immersion 6 kg, Night Diving and Briefing do require additional items of personal equipment (refer below).

== Competition area ==
The sport is conducted in a 50m swimming pool with a minimum depth of 2m. The International rules do allow the Obstacle Course event to be conducted in natural water bodies that satisfy the definition of 'sheltered water' (i.e. 'confined water with swimming pool like conditions').

== Events ==
As of December 2007, the sport had 5 events codified for competition at international level. These consisted of 3 individual events – Event M 300 metres, Night Diving and Immersion 6 kg; and 2 team events – Obstacle Course and Briefing. Additional events have been developed in Spain by Federación Española de Actividades Subacuáticas (FEDAS) and are included in local, regional and national Sport Diving competitions in that country.

=== Individual events ===
Event M 300 metres is a time trial event conducted over 300m (i.e. 6 laps of a 50m pool) and consisting of the following activities:

- 1st lap – entry using scuba, removal of scuba set at mid-lap, free swimming ascent to the surface and commencement of surface swim using snorkel.
- 2nd lap – surface swim.
- 3rd lap – free dive to locate, recover and don scuba set, and commencement of underwater swim on scuba
- 4th to 6th laps – underwater swim on scuba.

Night Diving is an event where a competitor wearing a blacked-out diving mask needs to find 3 items placed on the bottom of the swimming pool within 3 minutes. The competitor is provided with a drag rope of length no longer than 5m, a clip for tying up the rope and a bag to hold collected items. The competitor after donning the blacked-out dive mask is escorted on the surface by a judge to a basic shot line moored in the centre of the competition area. The competitor then descends to the pool bottom to commence searching. The 3 items are placed 4 metres apart and at distances of 2, 3 and 4 metres from the centre of the competition area. Competitors are ranked using a scoring system that gives points for the number of items collected and the collection of items in the quickest time.

Immersion 6 kg is an event involving the lifting of a 6 kg weight from the bottom of a swimming pool to the surface using a lifting bag. The first competitor to successfully compete the task is the winner.

=== Team events ===
Obstacle Course is a time based event where a buddy pair swims a distance of 100 m in a course occupying 2 full swimming pool lanes whilst carrying out the following sequence of tasks:

- Swim through a 2 m long tunnel made of 1 m diameter hoops suspended in mid-water in each lane starting at the 5 m mark.
- The divers then make contact and breathe from one cylinder using an alternative air source from the 12 m mark until they reach the 42 m mark where the recipient diver resumes breathing from their own cylinder.
- Each diver then removes their diving mask and places it in a basket located at the 45 m mark in each lane and then swims to the 50 m mark (i.e. the end of pool) and then returns to the basket to collect and refit their mask.
- Prior to entering a single 5 m long tunnel located at the 65 m marker, each diver removes their scuba set and swim through the tunnel in single file holding the scuba set in front of them..
- After exiting the 5 m tunnel, each diver refits their scuba set, collects an object moored on the pool bottom at the 73 m mark and ascends to the surface as a pair.
- On the surface at the 75 m mark, the buddy pair swims to the 100 m marker (i.e. the end of the course) whilst towing the 'object' and breathing from the atmosphere.

Competitors are ranked according to the time taken to complete the course plus the addition of time penalties for mistakes made during the course (i.e. using hands during underwater swimming and touching the obstacles).

Briefing is a time-based event in which a team of 4 divers carry out a search and information gathering task after receiving instructions whilst underwater. The event operates in the following sequence:

- Just before entering the pool, a member of the team (identified as the Team Captain in the rules) is instructed on the order of the search for and what information is to be recorded from 16 'signal-pliers'. These are equally spaced across the bottom of the pool with 4 in each quadrant of the pool.
- The divers enter the pool from its 4 corners and swim underwater to meet in the middle where the team captain communicates the task.
- The 4 team members each search a quadrant of the pool for the 'signal-pliers' in the required order and record the required information in their personal notebooks.
- When all of the information is collected, the divers return to the middle of the pool to review the results. The team captain checks the collected information for correctness and may amend a particular notebook or send a diver back to a particular 'signal-plier' to confirm the required information.
- When the team captain is finally satisfied, the team ascend to the surface of the pool as a group.

Teams are ranked using a scoring system that gives points for precision and the completion of the task in the quickest time.

== Governing body ==
The governing body is the Sport Diving Commission of the CMAS Sport Committee. As of June 2013, the following countries have affiliated with the commission – Bosnia-Herzegovina, Belarus, Croatia, Cyprus, Estonia, France, Hong Kong, Indonesia, Italy, Japan, Morocco, Poland, Russia, Spain and Ukraine .

== Origins and history ==
The creation of the sport is attributed to Marifé Abad, a resident of Zaragoza, Spain who developed it during the years 1998 to 2000. The inspiration for the sport is attributed to Ángel Martínez Lardiés of the Aragonese Federation of Underwater Activities (FARAS) who originally designed the activity now known as the Event M 300 metres. The first competition was held during 2000 in Zaragoza. It was introduced to CMAS at its general assembly held in Seville, Spain during 2005. During 2007, draft rules of competition were prepared by the Russian Underwater Federation and it was demonstrated at the First World Underwater Games held in Bari, Italy. During 2008, it was made an official CMAS underwater sport at the CMAS General Assembly in Hurghada, Egypt and it was added to the Russian Register of sports. Its peak body, the Sport Diving Commission first officially met at the 2009 CMAS General Assembly in Phuket, Thailand with Marifé Abad as its chair.

== Competitor admission requirements ==
Competitors must have a Confédération Mondiale des Activités Subaquatiques (CMAS) diving certification and must be 16 years of age in order to participate. Competitors are classified by gender and by age at the first day of year in which the competition is held – Junior (16–17 years old) and Senior (18 years old).

== Championships ==
As of July 2015, the following major championships have been conducted within Europe at locations where the majority of the interest in this sport lies:

- 1st European Sport Diving Championship, 25 July 2010 Kazan, Russia.
- Snow Fins Competition (International Finswimming and Sport Diving competition), 21–25 January 2011, Tomsk, Russia.
- 2nd Sport Diving World Cup, 24–29 August 2011, Valladolid, Spain.
- Snowfins 2012 (CMAS International Finswimming and Sport Diving competition), 3–8 February 2012 Tomsk, Russia.
- 2nd European Sport Diving Championship, 23 April 2012 Perm, Russia.
- 1st World Championship, 10–11 August 2013, Kazan, Russia.
- Snow Fins 2013 (CMAS Finswimming and Sport Diving competition), 15–20 November 2013, Tomsk, Russia.
- Aquathlon and Sport Diving European Championship, 23–27 October 2014, Kaunas, Lithuania
- 2nd World Championship, 26–30 June 2015, Saint Petersburg, Russia
