= CMAS Europe =

Non-profit branch of the world underwater federation representing European affiliates

- Abbreviation: CMAS EU
- Formation: June 25, 2005; 21 years ago at Brussels
- Type: INGO
- Legal status: Association internationale sans but lucrative, incorporated in Belgium
- Purpose: Promotion and defence of CMAS within the European Union
- Headquarters: Office of FEBRAS-BEFOS (Belgian National Diving Federation)
- Location: Brusselsesteenweg 313-315 2800 Mechelen - Belgium Belgium.
- Region served: Europe
- Members: CMAS National Federations based in Europe
- Official language: English
- President: Ronny Margodt
- Main organ: Board of Directors.
- Affiliations: EUF
- Website: cmas-europe.net

CMAS Europe (CMAS EU) is an organisation created expressly to represent the interests of Confédération Mondiale des Activités Subaquatiques (CMAS) within the European Union and in other parts of Europe by European national diving federations affiliated to CMAS.

== Purpose and organisation ==
Its purpose is to promote, support, develop and as necessary, defend the following interests of CMAS within the European Union and in other parts of Europe - the CMAS International Diver Training Certification System, underwater sports represented by CMAS, the actions of the CMAS Scientific Committee concerning the protection of both the marine environment and underwater cultural heritage, and all other events relevant to CMAS' aims. It is incorporated as an Association internationale sans but lucrative in Belgium. Its operation is overseen by a board of directors.

It holds special membership status within the European Underwater Federation (EUF).

== Membership ==
The following organisations (in alphabetical order by name of country) are the CMAS National Federations which founded CMAS EU on 25 June 2005:

- Austria - Tauchsportverband Österreichs (TSVÖ)
- Belgium - Fédération Royale Belge De Recherches et d'Activites Sous-Marines and Belgische Federatie voor Onderwateronderzoek in-sport (FEBRAS-BEFOS)
- Cyprus - Cyprus Federation of Underwater Activities (AUFC)
- Czech Republic - Svaz Potápěčů České Republiky (SPČR)
- Denmark - Dansk Sportdykker Forbund (DSF)
- Estonia - All Eesti Veeliit (EAVSL)
- Finland - Ry Sukelajaliito (SR)
- France - Fédération Française d'Études et de Sports Sous-Marins (FFESSM) - terminated membership in 2014
- Germany - Verband Deutscher Sporttaucher eV (VDST)
- Great Britain - Sub-Aqua Association (SAA)
- Great Britain - British Underwater Sports Association (BUSA)
- Greece - Hellenic Federation for Underwater Activities (HFUA)
- Hungary - Magyar Buva Szakszövetség (MBSZ)
- Ireland - Comhairle Fo-Thuinn (CFT)
- Italy - Federazione Italiana Attività Subacquee (FIAS)
- Latvia - CMAS Baltic (CB)
- Lithuania - Lietuvos Povandeninio Sporto Federcija (LUSF)
- Luxembourg - Fédération Luxembourgeoise des Activités et Sports Subaquatiques (FLASSA)
- Malta - Federation of Underwater Activities Malta (FUAM)
- Netherlands - Nederlandse Onderwatersport Bond (NOB)
- Poland - Komisja Dzialalnosci Podwodnej - Polskie Towarzystwo Turystyczno-Krajoznawcze (KDP-PTTK)
- Poland - Polski Zwiarek Pletwonurkowania (PZP)
- Portugal - Federação Portuguesa de Actividades Subaquaticas (FPAS)
- Slovakia - Zväz Potãpacov Slovenska (SPA)
- Slovenia - Slovenska Potapljaska Zveza (SPZ)
- Spain - Federación Española de Actividades Subacuáticas (FEDAS)
- Sweden - Svenska Sportdykarförbundet (SSDF)
