= Sport in Ireland =

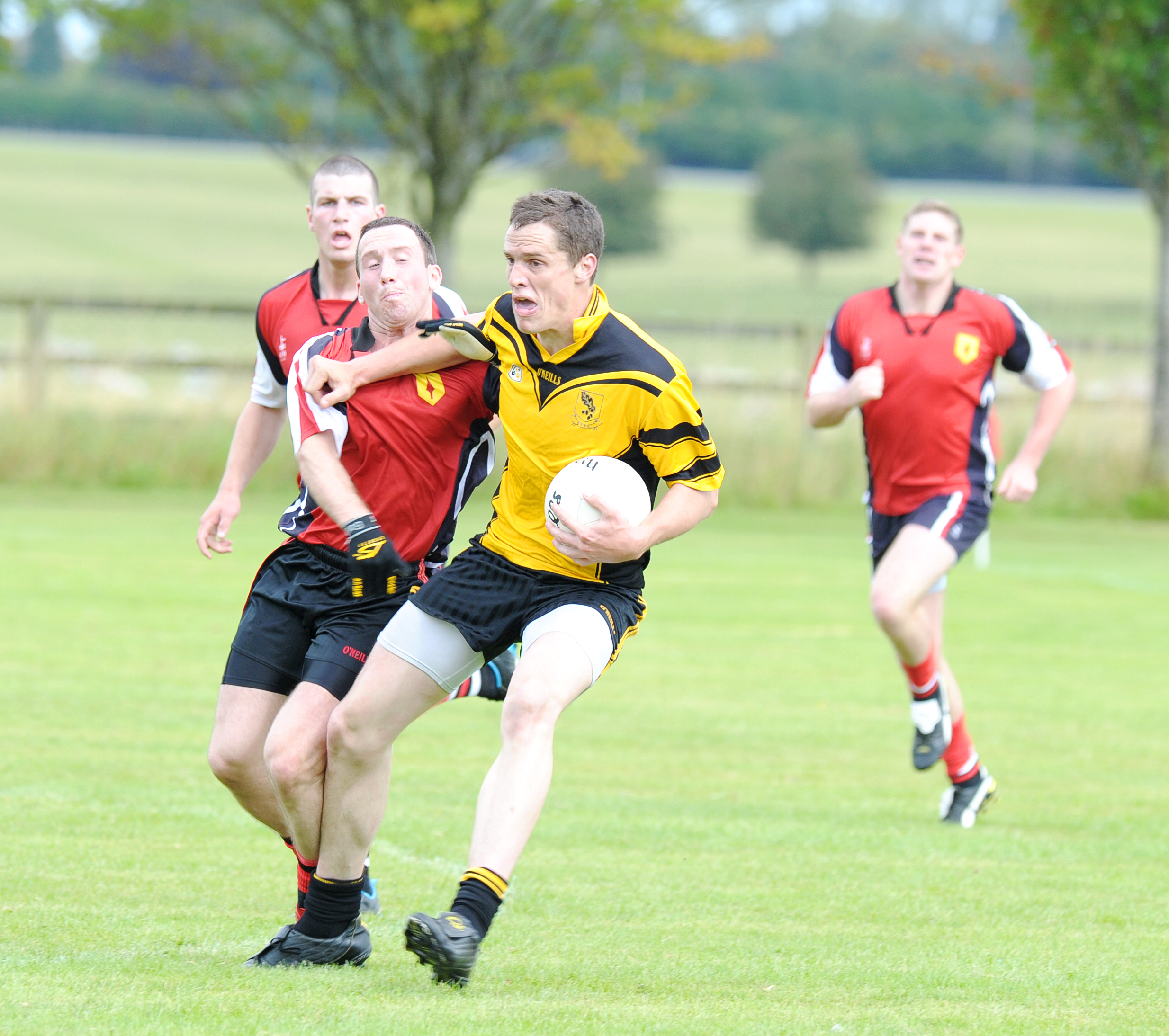
Gaelic football is one of the most popular sports in Ireland.

Sport plays an important role in Irish society. The many sports played and followed in Ireland include Gaelic games (including Gaelic football, hurling, camogie and handball), association football, horse racing, show jumping, greyhound racing, basketball, fishing, motorsport, boxing, tennis, hockey, golf, rowing, cricket, and rugby union.

In terms of participation, association football (soccer) as of 2016 was the most popular team pursuit for males at 8.8% with Gaelic football attracting 3.4%. Personal exercise (at 13.4%) and running (8.9%) are the most popular individual male activities. Traditionally, team sports do not figure highly amongst females, with a greater percentage of post-school-age women choosing individual sports and fitness activities. As of 2018, additional funding and focus was afforded to females in sport, with a number of successes in women's international sporting competitions. Association football (soccer) is the most played team sport in Ireland. Gaelic football, hurling, golf, aerobics, cycling, swimming and billiards/snooker are the other sporting activities with the highest levels of participation in the Republic of Ireland.

In terms of support and attendance, Gaelic football accounted for 34% of total sports attendances at events in the Republic of Ireland in 2003, followed by hurling at 23%, association football (soccer) at 16% and rugby at 8%. In 2005, Initiative's ViewerTrack study measuring sports audiences showed that Gaelic football's highest-profile match, the All-Ireland Football Championship Final, was the most watched event of the nation's sporting year.

In terms of funding, of the €62 million allocated in the Irish government's 2017 Capital Sports Programme, approximately €25 million was allocated to hurling, Gaelic football and other games overseen by the Gaelic Athletic Association, €7.7 million to soccer, €3.3 million to rugby, €2.8 million to tennis, golf €2.4 million, sailing and rowing €1.3 million each, boxing and athletics over €1 million each, swimming €0.5 million, with the remainder allocated among other sports and sporting groups.

As Northern Ireland is a constituent nation of the United Kingdom, it also sends a Northern Ireland Team to the Commonwealth Games. At the Olympic Games, a person from Northern Ireland can choose to represent either Ireland or Great Britain.

== Gaelic games ==
In a survey released in January 2021, Gaelic games were collectively identified as "Ireland's favourite sport(s)".

=== Gaelic football ===
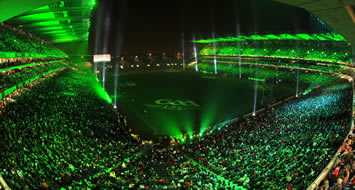
Croke Park in Dublin is the headquarters of the Gaelic Athletic Association.

The sport may be referred to as Gaelic football or Gaelic, if confusion might otherwise arise with association football, but is referred to simply as 'football' within the sport itself, such as the All-Ireland Senior Football Championship. Though it has existed for centuries in Ireland as Caid, Gaelic football was formally arranged into an organised playing code by the Gaelic Athletic Association (GAA) in the late nineteenth century. In terms of support and attendance, it is the most popular sport in Ireland.

=== Hurling ===
Hurling is a sport native to Ireland for several thousand years, organized by the Gaelic Athletic Association. In terms of attendance figures, hurling is second only to Gaelic football. Hurling is sometimes described as the "fastest field sport in the world", as the ball is continually played at high speeds. Hurling and camogie are both included on UNESCO's Representative List of the Intangible Cultural Heritage of Humanity.

=== Camogie ===
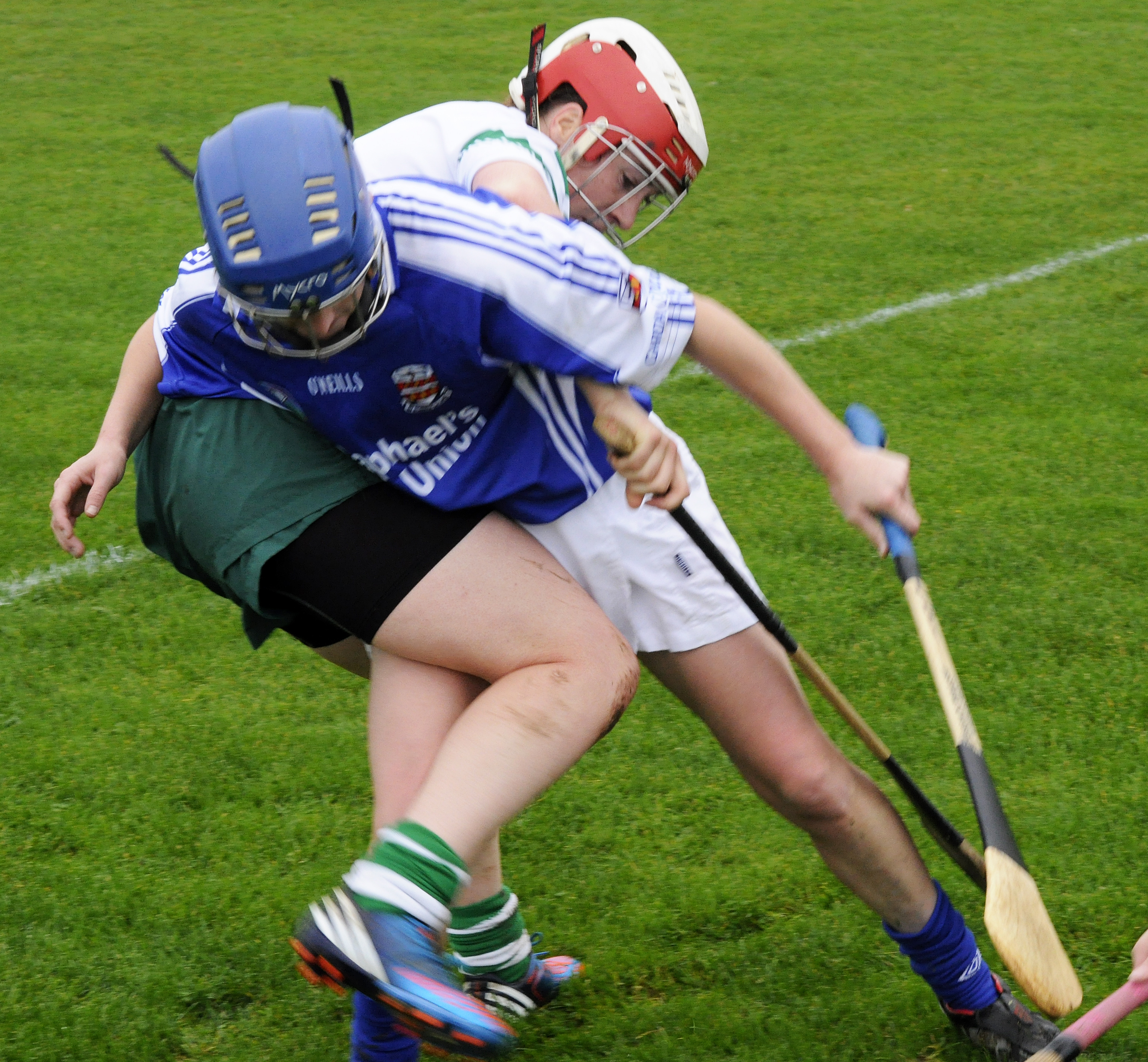
Garda vs. Defence Forces camogie match in 2012

Camogie, played exclusively by women, is similar to hurling although a smaller sliotar is used, there is the option to hand-pass into the goal. The first game of camogie was played in County Meath in 1904.

=== Gaelic handball ===
Gaelic handball, or simply 'handball', like the related sport of American handball, somewhat resembles squash or racquetball, but with the ball played or struck with the hand or fist instead of a racquet. It has no connection with the Olympic sport of handball.

In Ireland, there are four main types of handball. These are 40x20 (small court), the traditional 60x30 Softball and Hardball (big alley) and One-wall handball.

=== Rounders ===
Rounders (Irish: cluiche corr) is regulated by the Gaelic Athletic Association (GAA) in Ireland, and is similar to baseball. Game-play centers around innings where teams alternate at turns being batters and fielders.

== Association football ==
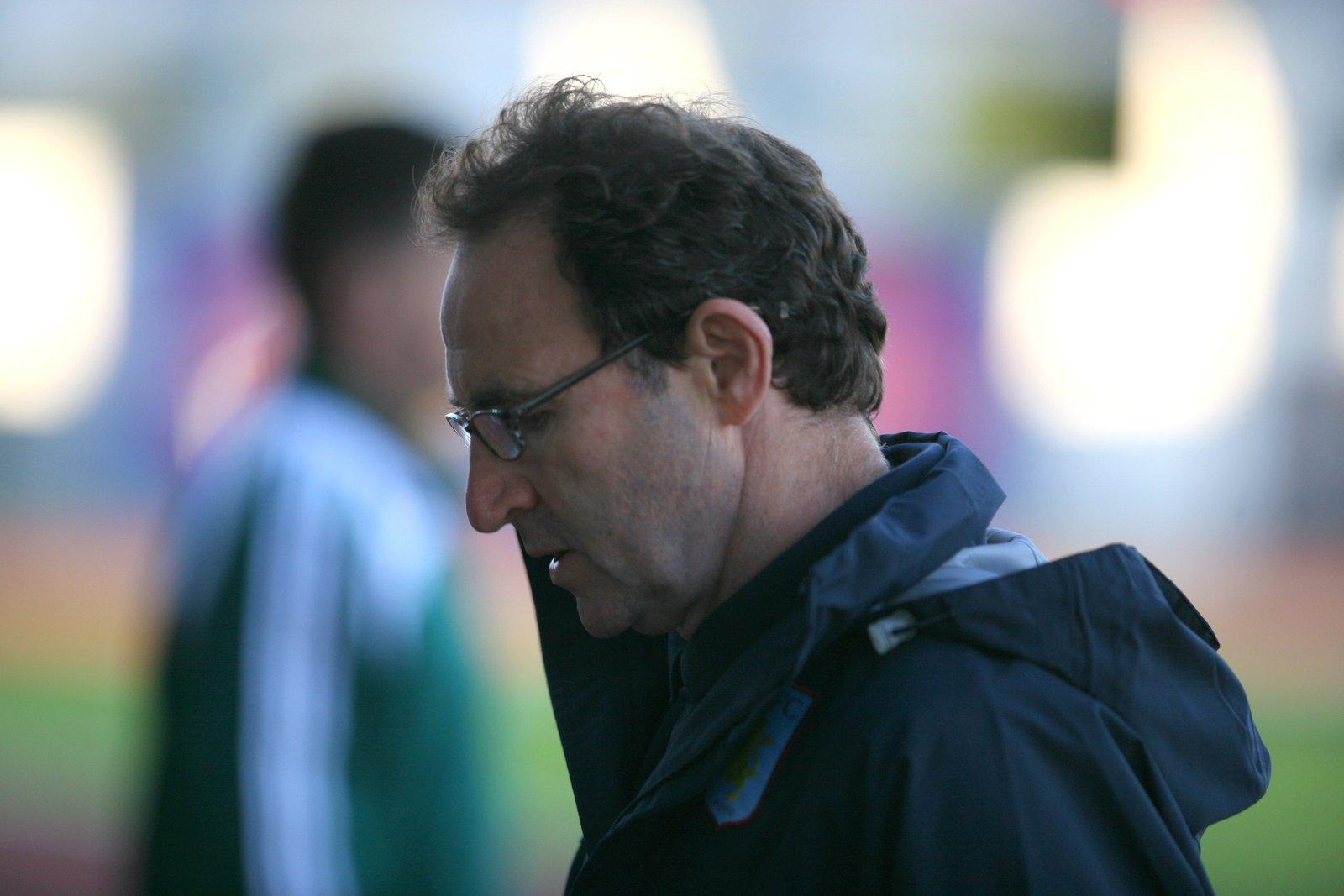
Martin O'Neill played for the Northern Ireland national team as a soccer player and subsequently managed the Republic of Ireland national team.

Association football is a popular sport in the Republic of Ireland and Northern Ireland but while international matches play before large crowds, and are passionately followed, domestic league games typically attract smaller attendances. English football leagues are also popular in Ireland, with a survey in February 2020 indicating that up to 40,000 Irish fans travel to games in England on a "regular basis".

The national body in the Republic of Ireland is the Football Association of Ireland (FAI) while the national body in Northern Ireland is the Irish Football Association (IFA).

The domestic leagues are the League of Ireland (in the Republic) and the NIFL Premiership (or Irish League) (Northern Ireland).

On the international stage, the Republic of Ireland and Northern Ireland teams have both competed in three FIFA World Cup competitions.

== Rugby union ==
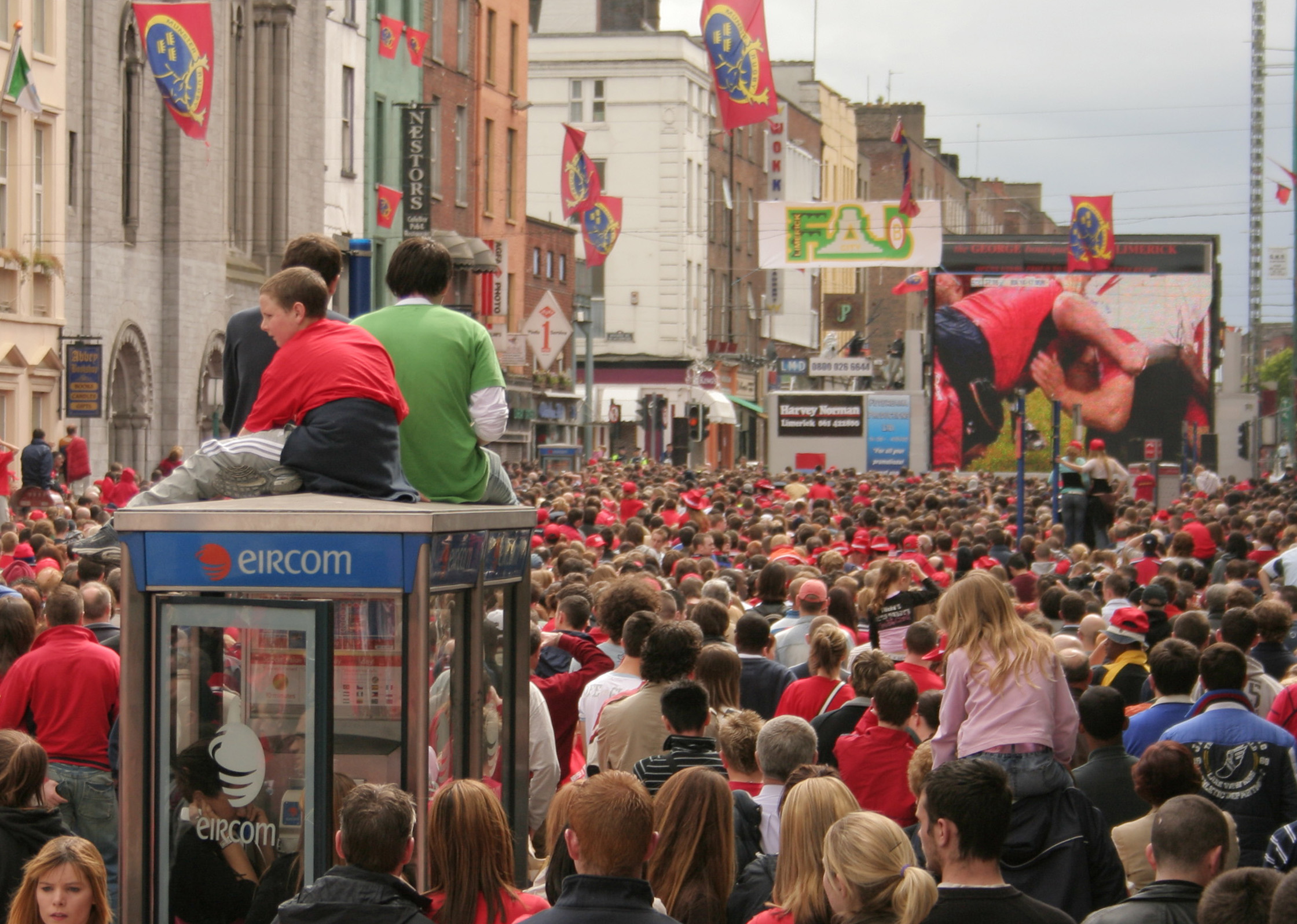
Munster fans watching the 2005–06 Heineken Cup final on the streets of Limerick

Rugby union is played and supported throughout Ireland, and is especially popular in urban areas such as Dublin, Limerick, Belfast in Northern Ireland, and Cork. Rugby union is played at club, province and national levels. The Ireland national team is composed of players from both Northern Ireland and the Republic, and the Irish Rugby Football Union governs the sport throughout the island. The sport is organised at all levels on an all-island basis through a provincial structure of four unions, with each province organising one professional team in elite competition.

Success at international level and the establishment of four professional teams has increased interest in rugby union as a sport in Ireland, particularly as a spectator sport. At the 2018 World Rugby Awards, Ireland had been presented with a 'hat-trick' of awards, with Johnny Sexton winning the Player of the Year, Joe Schmidt the Coach of the Year, and the national squad the Team of the Year awards. As of July 2022, following two defeats of New Zealand, the Ireland national rugby union team was ranked 1st in the World Rugby Rankings, but has never progressed beyond the quarter finals of the men's Rugby World Cup.

School rugby union is also played at primary and secondary level, and traditional rugby playing schools include: St Michael's College, Blackrock College, Belvedere College, Castleknock College, Clongowes Wood College, St Mary's College, and Terenure College in Dublin, Crescent College, Castletroy College, St Munchin's College, Glenstal Abbey and Ardscoil Rís in Limerick, Rockwell College in Tipperary, Presentation Brothers College, Bandon Grammar School and Christian Brothers College in Cork, and Campbell College, Royal Belfast Academical Institution and Methodist College Belfast in the north.

== Boxing ==
Boxing is overseen by the Boxing Union of Ireland and Irish Athletic Boxing Association. Amateur boxers account for sixteen of Ireland's 31 Olympic medals, including two Olympic gold medals. Ireland's amateur boxers have also won medals at numerous top level competitions worldwide including World Senior Championships, European Senior Championships, World Junior Championships, World Youth Championships, European Junior Championships and European Youth Championships.

The country's most successful boxers include Steve Collins, Bernard Dunne, Barry McGuigan, Michael Carruth, Ryan Burnett, Andy Lee, John Duddy, Carl Frampton, Kellie Harrington and Katie Taylor. The latter is among the world's most successful female boxers, and Taylor has won five European Championships and four World Championships, as well as the inaugural women's lightweight gold at the 2012 Olympics.

As of 2023, large-scale professional boxing events have not taken place in Ireland since a 2016 gangland shooting at a weigh-in at the Regency hotel in Dublin.

== Athletics ==
Athletics in Ireland is governed by Athletics Ireland, and in Northern Ireland by Athletics Northern Ireland. Athletics has seen some of the Ireland's highest performers at the Olympics, with several Irish athletes performing well for both the Republic of Ireland and Great Britain & Northern Ireland at the games over the years. Denis Horgan won the shot put 13 times at the AAAs, (still holding a title for greatest number of individual titles won), before emigrating to the United States where he won a number of American titles. Horgan also broke the world record on several occasions and silver at the 1908 Olympics. Dr. Pat O'Callaghan (also from North Cork) won the hammer throw in 1928 and again in 1932 at the Olympic Games. Bob Tisdall also won gold for Ireland in 1932, competing in the 400m hurdles. In the late 20th and early 21st century, notable athletes have included Ron Delany, Mary Peters, John Treacy, Eamonn Coghlan, Sonia O'Sullivan and Robert Heffernan.

The Dublin Marathon and Belfast Marathon are run annually and are two of the most popular athletics events in the country. The Women's Mini Marathon in Dublin has previously attracted upwards of 40,000 competitors.

== Equestrian ==
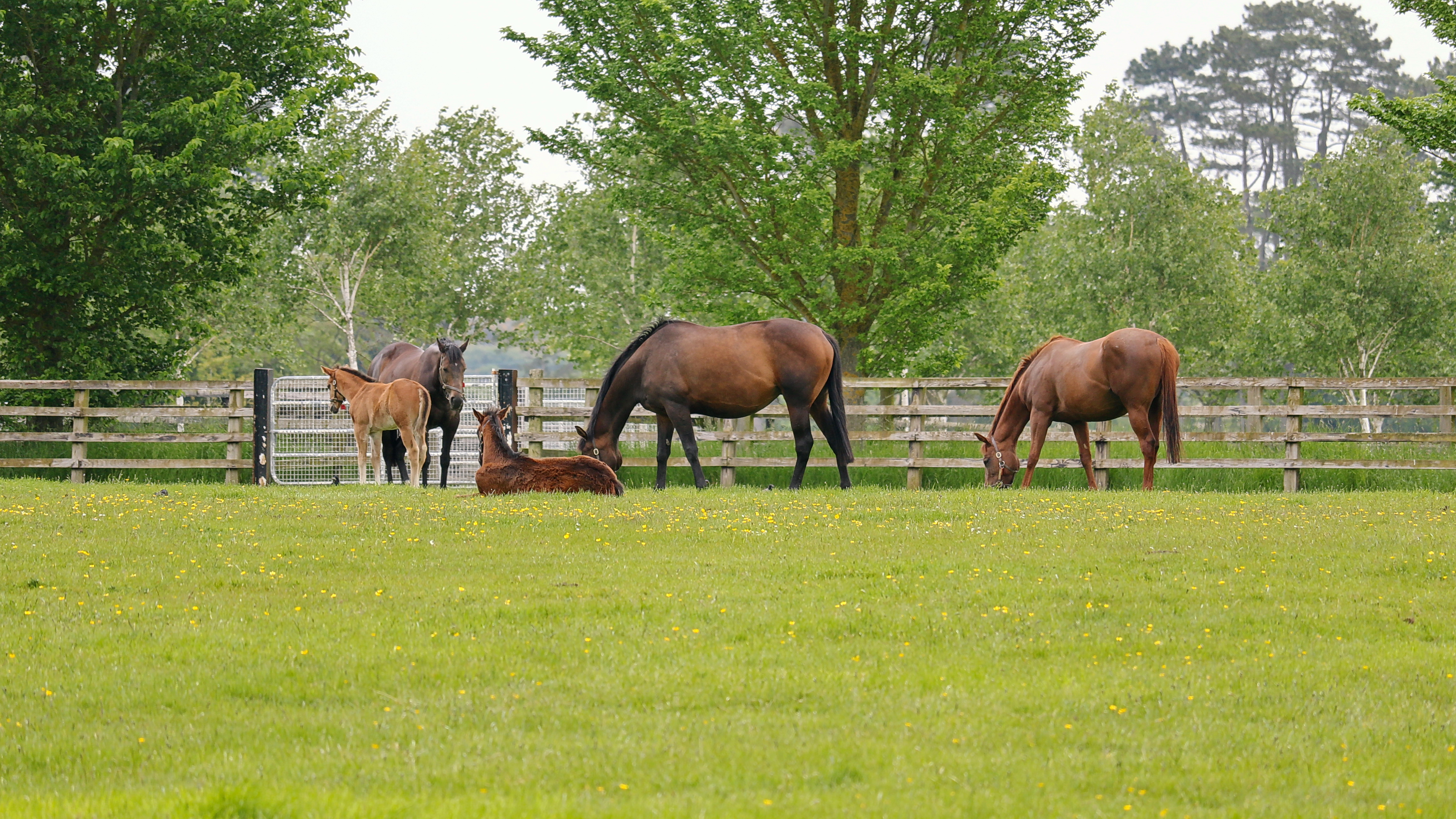
The Irish National Stud is in County Kildare.

The various equestrian sports have a sizeable following in Ireland. After Gaelic games, horse racing is the second most attended sport in the country, with around 1.3 million attendees annually. That is the largest number of horseracing fans in any country on a per capita basis.

The governing body is Horse Sport Ireland (formerly the Equestrian Federation of Ireland), which is composed of 15 Irish affiliate bodies, representing all facets of equestrian sport. These sports include show jumping, eventing, dressage, endurance riding, para-equestrian, polo and carriage driving.

Overall administration of Irish horse-racing is carried out by Horse Racing Ireland. Horse Racing Ireland is responsible for racing in both the Republic of Ireland, which has 24 racecourses, and in Northern Ireland, which has 2 racecourses. Ireland's top tracks are the Curragh and Fairyhouse. The breeding industry (including the world's largest thoroughbred breeding operation, Coolmore Stud) has produced many top race horses.

== Golf ==
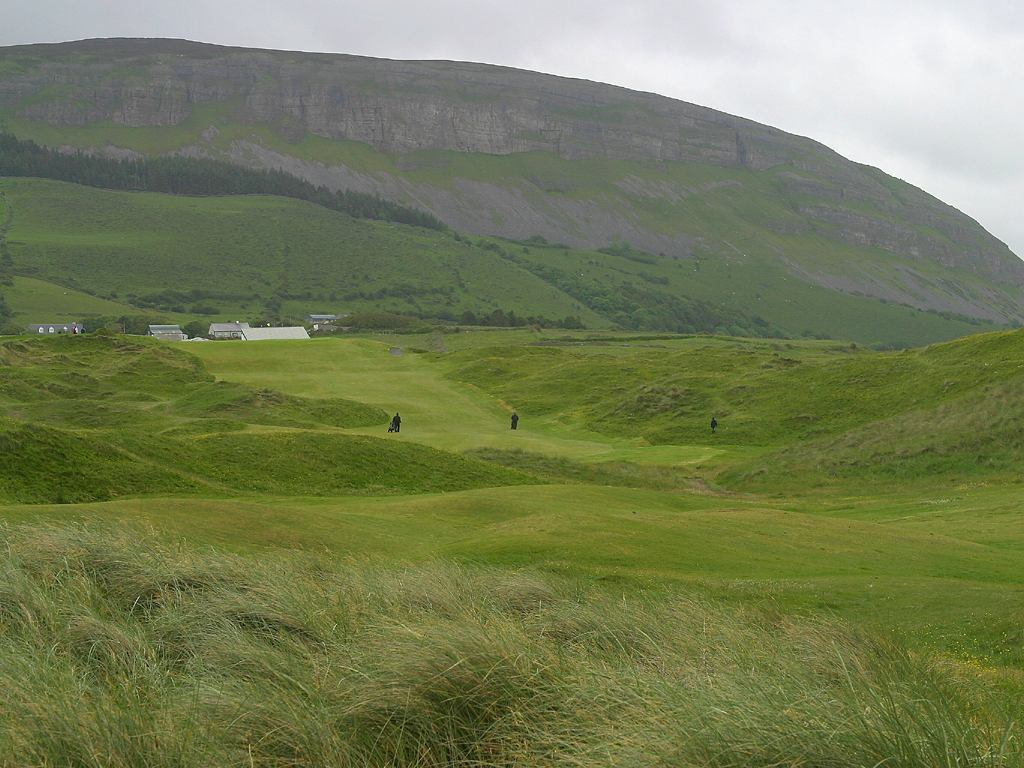
Strandhill Golf Course in County Sligo, one of many coastal golf courses throughout Ireland

As of the early 21st century, golf is among the most-played sports in the country, with a 2008 report for the Irish Sports Council indicating that golf was then the fourth most popular sport by participation rate. Ireland was the first country to organise the sport on a national basis, with two "oldest governing bodies in world golf", the Golfing Union of Ireland (GUI) and the Irish Ladies Golf Union (ILGU), being formed in 1891 and 1893 respectively. These organisations merged in 2021 to form Golf Ireland.

There are over 400 golf clubs throughout the island, and over 300 courses in the Republic of Ireland, and (as of 2009) Ireland reportedly had the fourth most golf courses per capita in the world, Among Ireland's most famous golf courses are Royal County Down Golf Club, Royal Portrush Golf Club, Portmarnock, Ballybunion and Lahinch. The most prestigious tournament of Ireland is the Irish Open, which is held on courses in the four provinces. Also, the K Club in County Kildare hosted the European Open from 1995 to 2007. Golf is regularly televised in Ireland, with both domestic and international events broadcast.

Ireland produced several top golfers in the late 20th and early 21st century, with players like Pádraig Harrington, Paul McGinley and Shane Lowry achieving significant success internationally. For example, Harrington and McGinley won the World Cup of Golf in 1997 and, together with Clarke, were part of the European team that successfully defended the 2006 Ryder Cup. Harrington also won The Open Championship (British Open) in 2007 and 2008, and the 2008 PGA Championship. Lowry won the 2019 Open Championship.

Three golfers from Northern Ireland have had notable international successes in the 21st century. Rory McIlroy, who has spent extended periods as number one in the Official World Golf Ranking, is one of only three men to win golf's "Grand Slam", including the US Open (2011), US PGA Championship (2012 and 2014), Open Championship (2014), and Masters Tournament (2025). Graeme McDowell won the 2010 U.S. Open, becoming the first Irish player to do so. Darren Clarke won the 2011 Open Championship.

== Cricket ==
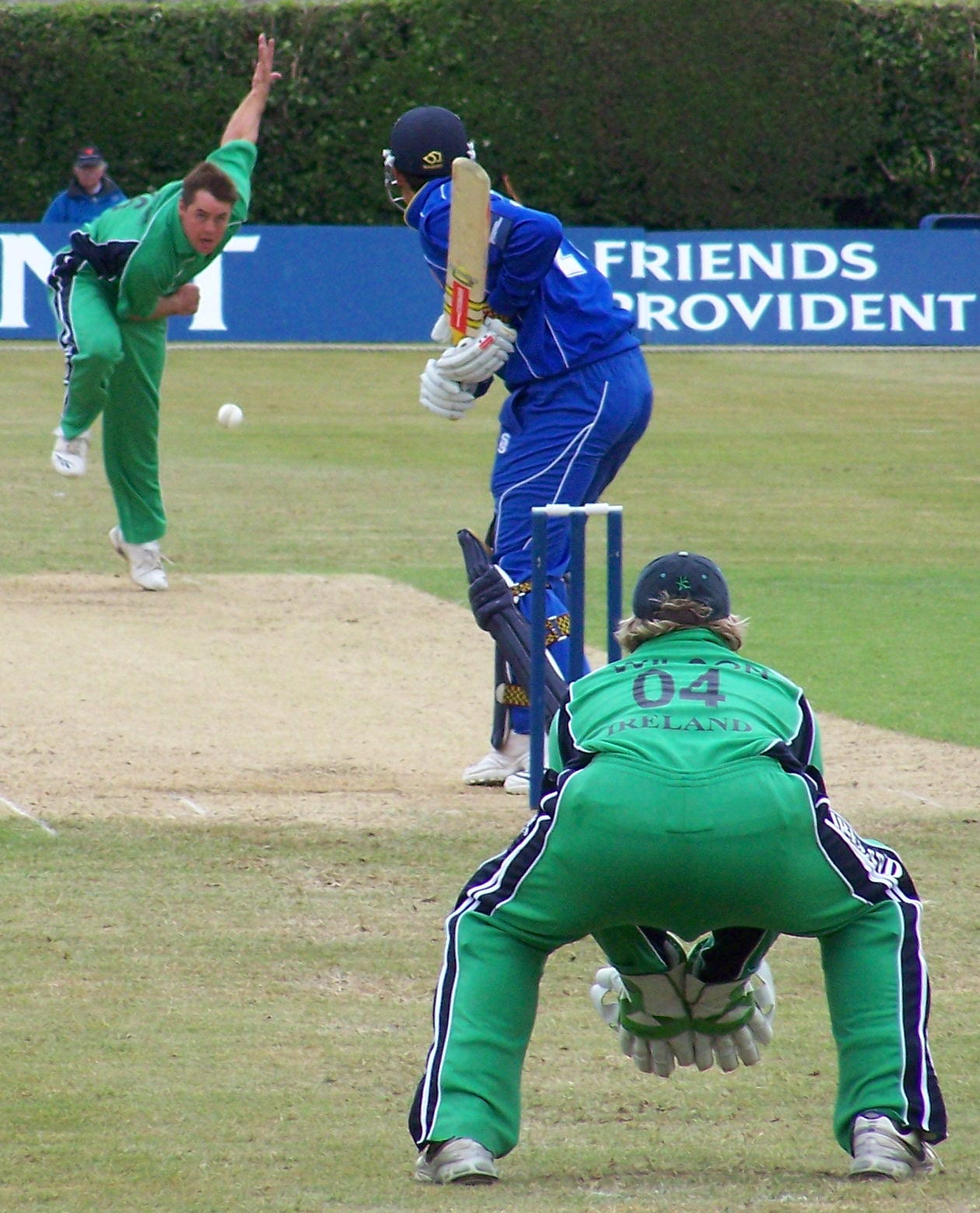
Ireland compete against Essex at Castle Avenue

Cricket has been played in Ireland since the early 19th century, and the game against Scotland (a match which has first-class status) has been played annually since 1909.

The sport is organised on an all-island basis and is overseen by Cricket Ireland, formerly the Irish Cricket Union. After becoming an 'associate member' of the International Cricket Council in 1993, Ireland sought qualification for several Cricket World Cups, and reached the "Super 8" stage of the 2007 Cricket World Cup finals.

The Ireland cricket team was among the associate nations that qualified for the 2007 Cricket World Cup. It defeated Pakistan and finished second in its pool, earning a place in the Super 8 stage of the competition. The team also competed in the 2009 ICC World Twenty20, and won the 2009 ICC World Cup Qualifier to secure a place in the 2011 Cricket World Cup. Kevin O'Brien scored the fastest century in World Cup history (113 runs off 63 balls), as Ireland produced one of the great upsets to defeat England by 3 wickets in the 2011 tournament. In 2017, domestic cricket in Ireland was recognized as first-class cricket for the first time, and was granted Test status in 2017.

Prior to the granting of Test status, a number of Irish cricketers went to England to play Test cricket, including Eoin Morgan from Dublin, who captained the English cricket team to 2019 Cricket World Cup success.

== Field hockey ==
Field hockey (known in Ireland as just "hockey") is played throughout the country, particularly in secondary schools. The governing body in Ireland is the Irish Hockey Association. The Ireland women's national field hockey team reached the final of the Women's Hockey World Cup in 2018. As of 2018, the Ireland men's national field hockey team were ranked 10th in the FIH World Rankings.

== Other sports ==
=== American Football ===
American football was first played on the island of Ireland in the 1940s by United States servicemen stationed in Northern Ireland during World War II. Organised play among amateur local teams began in 1986. Ireland is also host to an annual regular season NCAA game, the Aer Lingus College Football Classic, and in 2025 was due to host a game as part of the NFL International Series.

American Football Ireland (AFI), the governing body for the sport in Ireland, oversee league play among amateur teams from both the Republic of Ireland and Northern Ireland. As of 2025, full-contact senior men's football was being contested by 16 teams across two divisions, with the annual champion of the AFI Premier Division playoff being awarded the Shamrock Bowl. AFI also organises developmental youth leagues, co-ed and women's flag football competitions, as well as overseeing the Irish Wolfhounds national team which competes in International Federation of American Football (IFAF) competitions.

=== Australian rules football ===
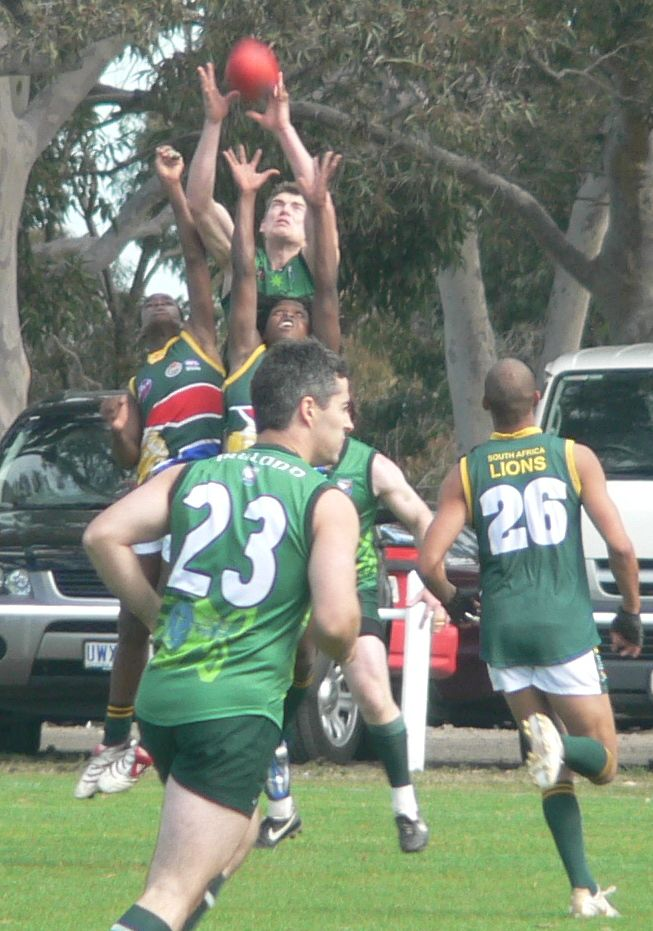
Ireland and South Africa in the 2008 AFL International Cup

Australian rules football has gained a following in Ireland which has increased mainly due to the International rules series that takes place annually between Australia and Ireland. In October 2000, the Australian Rules Football League of Ireland was established, and a representative Irish team took part in the 2005 Australian Football International Cup. The Irish Green Machine became inaugural International champions in 2002. They have been finalists in every AFL International Cup since and were 2011 International Cup champions. Belfast and Dublin have been hosts to the AFL Euro Cup.

=== Baseball ===
Baseball has some similarities to the Gaelic version of rounders. The Irish National Baseball Team won the bronze medal at the 2004 European Championships in Germany and followed up that performance with a silver medal in the 2006 European Championships in Belgium

The governing body is Baseball Ireland, which oversees club play and operates an adult league established in 1997 with teams in Dublin, Greystones and Belfast. Irish baseball was the subject of an award-winning documentary The Emerald Diamond in 2006.

=== Basketball ===
See also Ireland national basketball team

Basketball is overseen by Basketball Ireland. This governing body organises the sport's main competitions such as the Super League. The main basketball arena in Ireland is the National Basketball Arena in Dublin. The sport receives small amounts of media attention, with a few games broadcast on television annually. Basketball is mainly driven by school, college and club support. Pat Burke is the only Irish born to play in the NBA, he played for Orlando Magic and Phoenix Suns.

=== Chess ===
The Irish Chess Union (ICU), formed in 1912, is the governing body for chess in Ireland and a member of FIDE since 1933 and the European Chess Union. The ICU promotes Chess in Ireland and maintains the chess rating for players in Ireland, which are published three times a year. It runs competitions such as the Irish Chess Championship and selects teams to participate in international competitions for Ireland.

=== Croquet ===
Croquet was first played in Ireland in the 1830s. The governing association of the sport is the Croquet Association of Ireland. Most international matches and large tournaments are played at the Carrickmines Lawn Tennis and Croquet Club, near Dublin.

=== Cycling ===
There are many regional cycling clubs throughout the country and competitions are organised regularly, the largest non-professional event being the Rás (Irish for race). The main governing body is Cycling Ireland which is responsible for cycling throughout the island. Ireland's most famous cyclists are Stephen Roche, who won both the Tour de France and Giro d'Italia in 1987; and Sean Kelly, who won the Vuelta a España in 1988, the sprinter's green jersey in the Tour de France four times, the Paris-Nice seven times in succession as well as four of the five 'Monuments'. Mountain biking is supported by a number of dedicated trail centers in Wicklow, Dublin, Galway and Tipperary. For competitive mountain bikers, there is a National Cross-Country series, a National Downhill series and a National Enduro series. BMX events are undertaken at the Ratoath BMX track in County Meath, and an indoor BMX track in Cherry Orchard in County Dublin.

=== Darts ===
The Irish National Darts Organisation (INDO) is a governing body for Irish darts and is recognised by the World Darts Federation and British Darts Organisation.

=== Extreme sports ===
Extreme sports undertaken in Ireland include skateboarding, rollerblading, surfing, BMX, mountain biking, mountain boarding, kitesurfing and wakeboarding. Several of these sports have national governing bodies, such as the Irish Surfing Association, and national competitions, such as mountainbiking's national series.

Since 2005, skateparks (for skateboarding, rollerblading, and other sports) have been developed in several places, including in Greystones, Bushy park (Dublin) and Lucan (Dublin). Modular parks can be found in other parts of Ireland.

Speed climbing, an Olympic sport as of 2020, is governed by Mountaineering Ireland, which also maintains safety guidelines and training for mountain climbing, indoor climbing, bouldering, abseiling and hill-walking.

=== Greyhound racing ===
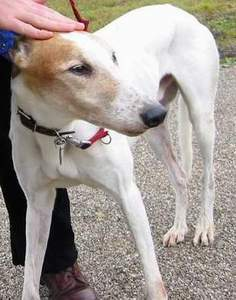
A racing greyhound

Greyhound racing began in Ireland in 1927; there were greyhound races in Celtic Park in Belfast on 18 April of that year and the Shelbourne Park greyhound stadium opened in Dublin four weeks later. Hare coursing was already a well established sport in the country and greyhounds were bred for racing in Ireland from the very start. Mick the Miller, winner of the English Derby in 1929 and 1930, was an Irish greyhound.

Within the Republic of Ireland, the licensing authority for greyhound racing is Greyhound Racing Ireland (formerly Bord na gCon), a semi-state body and which was established by the Irish government in 1958.

=== Gymnastics ===
Gymnastics Ireland logo

Gymnastics is governed by Irish Gymnastics, trading as Gymnastics Ireland, which was formed in 1999, following the merging of the Irish Amateur Gymnastics Association and the Irish Sports Acrobatics Federation. There are 83 registered gymnastics clubs in Ireland (including Northern Ireland). Gymnastics includes four Olympic disciplines, women's artistic gymnastics, men's artistic gymnastics, trampoline gymnastics, and rhythmic gymnastics, and four non-Olympic disciplines, acrobatic gymnastics, tumbling gymnastics, gymnastics for all, and sports aerobics.

The most successful Irish gymnast is Rhys McClenaghan – winning European, Commonwealth, world and Olympic titles - the only gymnast to win all four on the same apparatus. In 2019, he became the first Irish gymnast to qualify for a world championships final and to also win a medal, taking bronze on pommel horse. After contesting the 2020 Tokyo Olympics, at both the 2022 and 2023 World Artistic Gymnastics Championships, he won gold for men's pommel horse – the first world champion in gymnastics for Ireland. In addition to multiple European championships, at the 2024 Summer Paris Olympics, McClenaghan won gold in the Men's pommel horse.

=== Ice hockey ===
There is one professional ice hockey team in Northern Ireland, the Belfast Giants, playing in the Elite Ice Hockey League. The Irish Ice Hockey Association is the national governing body for the sport, and is responsible for the Ireland men's national ice hockey team and Ireland women's national ice hockey team.

=== Kendo ===
While still a minority sport in Ireland, there are a number of Kendo clubs based in Dublin, Cork, Galway and Cavan. The Irish Kendo Federation is the governing body for the country. The Irish National Kendo Squad participates in the European Kendo Championships and the World Kendo Championships, as well as other international competitions. The main Kendo event in Ireland is the annual Irish National Championships (INC) which takes place in June each year. Kendo in Northern Ireland is governed by the British Kendo Association (BKA).

=== Lacrosse ===
Lacrosse in Ireland is governed by Ireland Lacrosse, an association which is a member of World Lacrosse and the European Lacrosse Federation. The Irish men's lacrosse team made headlines in 2020 when, after qualifying for the 2022 World Games, the team gave up their place at the competition to allow the Iroquois men's national lacrosse team to participate. The Iroquois team, despite representing the Haudenosaunee Confederacy in which the sport originated, were originally excluded because they did not represent a sovereign nation with an Olympic Committee. The Irish national team refused to take their place at the competition, with the place being allocated to the Iroquois team.

=== Martial arts ===
The National Governing Body of Martial Arts in Ireland, as appointed by the Irish Sports Council, is the Irish Martial Arts Commission. The Irish Martial Arts Commission represents the martial arts of Aikido, Ju-Jitsu, Karate, Kendo, Kickboxing, Kung-Fu, TaeKwon-Do, Ninjutsu, Sambo and Tai Chi. The executive committee of the Irish Martial Arts Commission is made up of 2 representative elected within the membership of each Martial Art.

Taekwondo and Karate are represented by various clubs throughout the country. The All-Ireland Taekwondo Association works to promote the sport and to organise competitions. Kickboxing Ireland (formally known as Allstyles Kickboxing Association of Ireland) was founded in 1985 to unify and structure the sport in Ireland. It was recognised by the Irish Sports Council as a national governing body of sport in 1993 under the auspices of the Irish Martial Arts Commission.

=== Motorsport ===
Motorsport also has a presence in Ireland with Motorsport Ireland being the governing body throughout the country. Rallying is one popular form of motorsport, with three major Rally Championships taking place every year, each hosting 6-7 rally events across the country. These include the Donegal International Rally, West Cork Rally, Galway International Rally and others. Ireland also hosted a round of the World Rally Championship in 2007 and 2009, with stages being held in the Republic and also across the border in Northern Ireland, and was a stage candidate in 2016.

Circuit racing is also present in the country with Ireland having only one international venue, Mondello Park in County Kildare.

Motorcycle racing in Ireland is governed by Motorcycling Ireland. Established in 1902, it is the oldest motorcycle sport federation in the world.

=== Olympic Handball ===
Olympic Handball is a minority sport in Ireland, with the Irish Olympic Handball Association acting as the national governing body. In 2011, Ireland hosted the European Challenge Trophy in Olympic Handball (a competition for developing nations).

=== Orienteering ===
Orienteering in Ireland is regulated by the Irish Orienteering Association. Every two years, the Shamrock o-Ringen, Ireland's largest Orienteering event, is held in Cork or Kerry. Irish orienteers compete at all levels, sometimes reaching the finals at the World Orienteering Championships.

=== Pitch and putt ===
The sport of pitch and putt originated in County Cork in the 1930s, and was developed throughout Ireland during the 1940s. Since 1960 it has been overseen by the Pitch and Putt Union of Ireland, in turn a member of the European Pitch and Putt Association and Federation of International Pitch and Putt Associations. The Ireland men's national pitch and putt team won the 2008 Pitch and Putt World Cup.

=== Racquet sports ===
Tennis, badminton, racquetball and squash are common recreational sports in Ireland. In Tennis, Tennis Ireland is the governing body and runs several competitions between the approximately 200 clubs throughout Ireland. Ireland competes in tennis internationally in the Davis Cup (men's) and the Fed Cup (ladies). Ireland had had a prominent tennis tournament, the Irish Open, in the past, which was considered an important tournament prior to the establishment of world championship events in 1913. The men's event was abolished in 1979, and the women's event was abolished in 1983 - however, it remains as a lower-tier ITF tournament. Badminton in Ireland is run by the BUI.

=== Road bowling ===
Irish Road Bowling is an ancient sport. It is centred in Ireland but is also played in the United States and the United Kingdom.

=== Rowing ===
Rowing in Ireland is regulated by Rowing Ireland. During the winter, there are Head of the River Races (processional timed races) and during the summer there are Regattas (side by side racing). The Irish Championships are held at the National Rowing Centre in County Cork.

Successful Irish rowers include Paul O'Donovan (double Olympic champion and multiple world champion), Fintan McCarthy (double Olympic and world champion), Gary O'Donovan (former European and world champion), Emily Hegarty, Aifric Keogh, Eimear Lambe and Fiona Murtagh, Daire Lynch, Philip Doyle (all Olympic medallists). Prior to its cancellation from the Olympic program, Ireland had particular success in the lightweight division.

=== Rugby league ===
Rugby league in Ireland is governed by Rugby League Ireland, which runs the Irish Elite League (known as the Carnegie League for sponsorship purposes), which is the top level rugby league competition in Ireland. There are approximately 20 teams across Ulster, Munster and Leinster. The Irish rugby league team compete in the European Cup and the Rugby League World Cup. It is made up predominantly of players based in Great Britain. Ireland reached the quarter-finals of the 2000 Rugby League World Cup and the 2008 Rugby League World Cup.

=== Sailing ===
Sailing in Ireland was governed and regulated by the Yacht Racing Association until 1946, when the Irish Olympic Sailing Federation was established. This organisation enabled Irish sailors to compete at the 1948 London Olympic Regatta. Subsequently, the Irish Dinghy Racing Association (IDRA) was formed in order to regulate the International 12 Foot Dinghy Class in Ireland and to establish a National 14 Foot Class. Over time, the IDRA became known as the Irish Sailing Association, Irish Yachting Association, and is now known as Irish Sailing. It is based in Dún Laoghaire. Events are organised by the various clubs on the coasts and on the reservoirs and lakes. The first sailing club was the Cork Water Club (now the Royal Cork Yacht Club), which was founded in 1720. The earliest One-Design sailboat class is the Dublin Bay Water Wag, of which the first boat was built in 1886 and the club which organised the one-design sailing established in 1887.

=== Skydiving ===
In addition to a number of other air sports (including hang gliding, paragliding and ballooning), the National Aero Club of Ireland (NACI) is the governing body for skydiving in Ireland. The NACI, which is a member of the Fédération Aéronautique Internationale (FAI), represents the Irish Hang Gliding and Paragliding Association (IHPA) and Parachute Association of Ireland (PAI). The PAI acts as a licensing body for sport parachuting in the Republic of Ireland and "seeks to set and maintain standards for safety, training and operations for its members". The PAI issues the FAI's 'Certificates of Proficiency' to qualified Irish skydivers, and it also represents Irish sport parachuting at national and international levels.

=== Snooker and pool ===
Snooker and pool hold some interest in Ireland, with media coverage of most major international tournaments. The Republic of Ireland and Northern Ireland have produced some of the world's most successful snooker players, including Ken Doherty, Alex Higgins and Dennis Taylor.

=== Softball ===
See also Softball in Ireland

Softball in Ireland can be traced back as far as 1982, with the first organised competition, the Dublin Softball League, taking place in 1984. The Irish Softball Association is the governing body of softball in Ireland and is responsible for the running of tournaments, Leagues, development and international competition in both co-ed slowpitch and ladies fastpitch softball. The National Team (Co-Ed) has competed at European level since 1998, with the best results being Silver in 2002 and 2004.

=== Target shooting ===
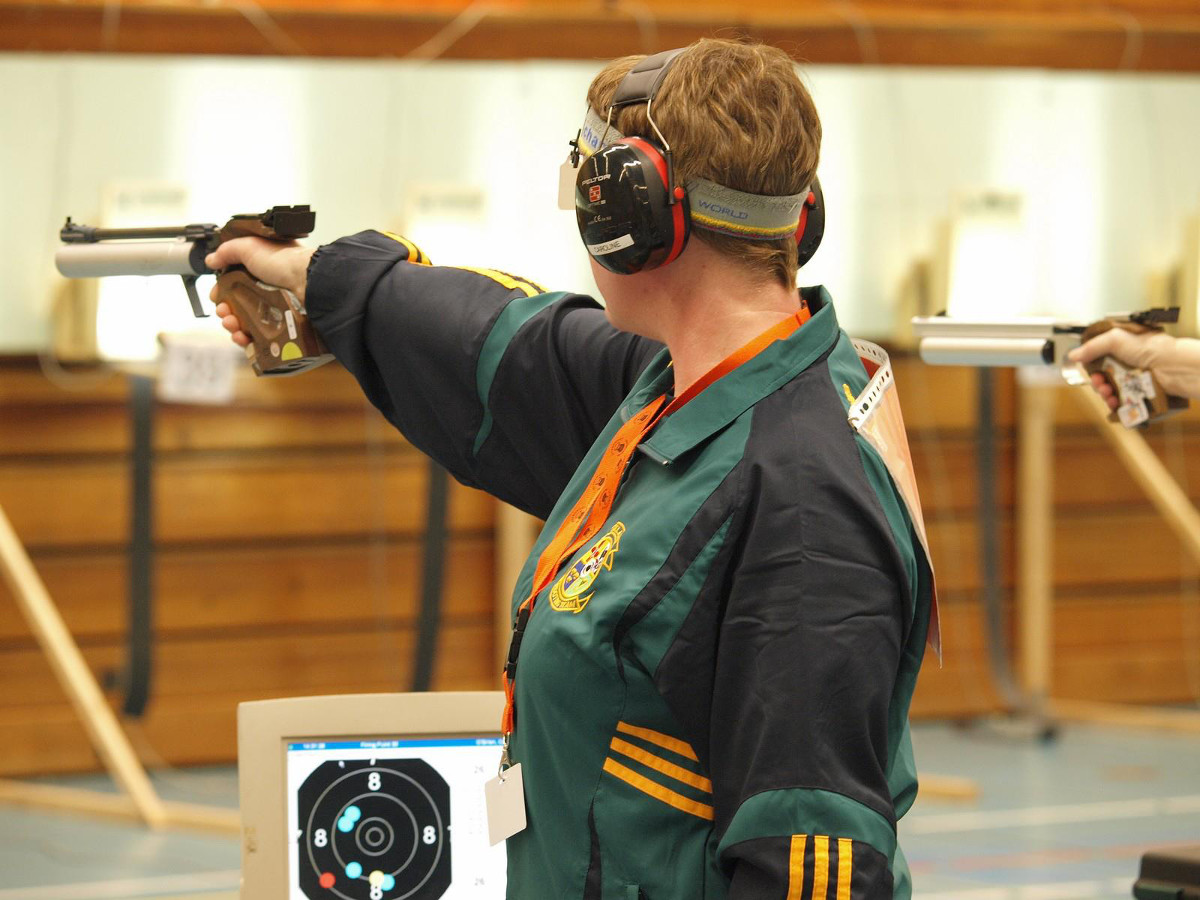
Member of the Irish Team competing in 10m Women's Air Pistol at InterShoot 2012

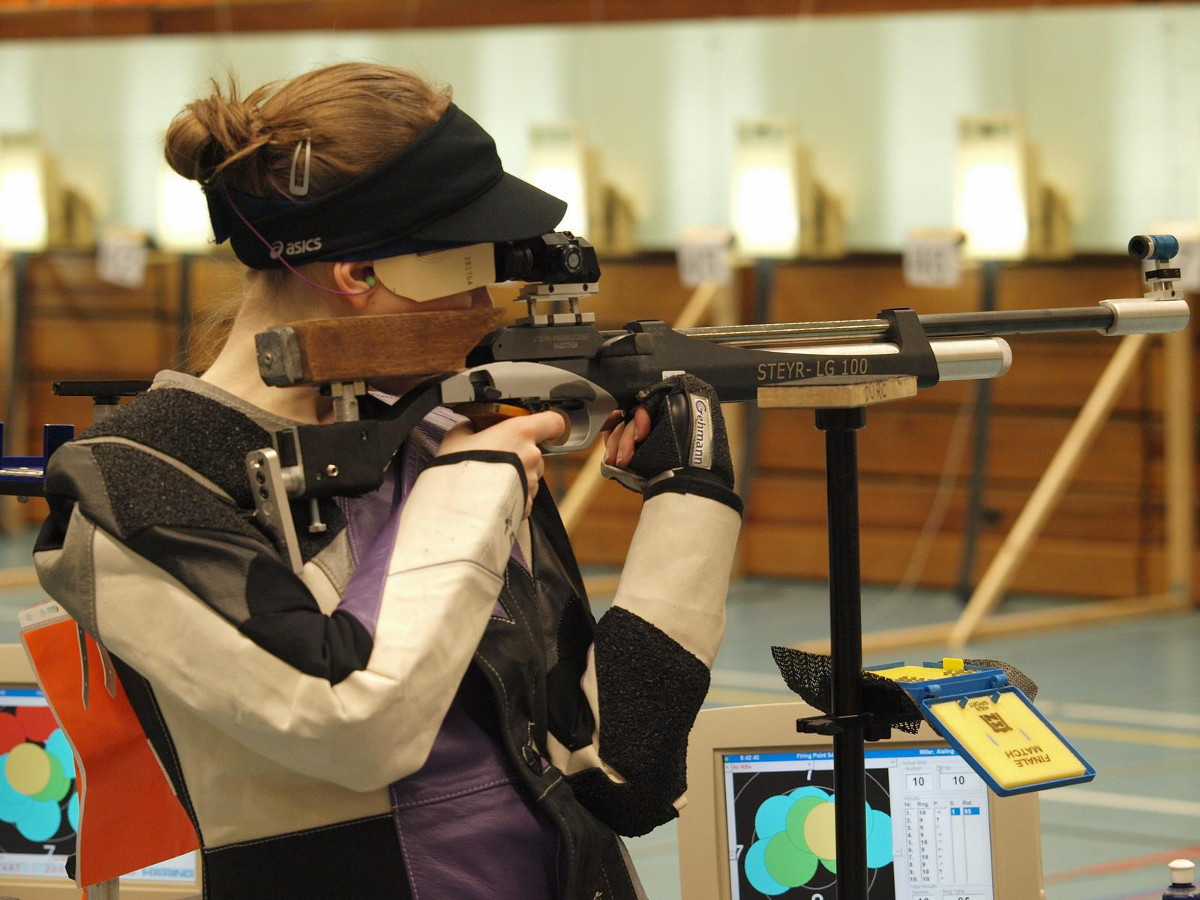
Member of the Irish Team competing in 10m Women's Air Rifle at InterShoot 2012

Target shooting in Ireland comprises a number of disciplines. These include the Olympic rifle and pistol shooting disciplines (administered by the National Target Shooting Association of Ireland), metallic silhouette shooting (administered by the National Silhouette Association Ireland), precision pistol, benchrest rifle, gallery rifle and sporting rifle disciplines (administered by the National Association of Sporting Rifle & Pistol Clubs or NASRPC), the Tetrathlon (administered by the Pony Club) and Olympic Penthathlon (administered by the Modern Pentathlon Association of Ireland), both Olympic and non-Olympic clay pigeon shooting (administered by the Irish Clay Pigeon Shooting Association) and various long-range rifle shooting disciplines (administered by the National Rifle Association of Ireland).

Ireland has had representation at international target shooting competitions, including the Olympic Games. The Irish Olympic clay pigeon team won the World Championships team event in Olympic Trap in 2002 and Irish shooter Philip Murphy claimed the silver medal in the 2007 World Shotgun Championships; he has also placed in the top ten in two World Championships and two World Cups. His teammate Derek Burnett won silver in the 2007 World Cup in Maribor, and another teammate, David Malone, won gold in the 2004 World Cup in Cairo. The team has also won several World Cup medals in both team and individual events. The clay pigeon high performance director has also been appointed head of the International Shooting Sport Federation (ISSF) coaches' committee and the head clay target instructor with the ISSF Training Academy. Ian O'Sullivan also became the World Junior Champion in Olympic Trap in the 2014 World Championships.

Ireland became world champions in Centrefire Gallery Rifle in the inaugural World Championships in 2013, in which the Irish team beat Great Britain and Germany. Gallery Rifle Shooting events are administered in Ireland by the NASRPC.

=== Triathlon and adventure racing ===
The Irish triathlon calendar includes approximately 200 events annually. The national body for the triathlon is Triathlon Ireland which organises competitions between various clubs throughout the country.

The Modern Pentathlon Association of Ireland was set up in 2004.

Adventure racing also takes place in Ireland. The majority of adventure races in Ireland fall into what's often called multisport, with run, cycle and kayak stages in events like WAR (Wicklow Adventure Race) and Gaelforce West, which are won in under 4 hours. There are also a few longer international-style adventure races lasting 24 hours and 36 hours, events like Beast of Ballyhoura and Cooley Raid.

=== Tug of war ===
Tug of war has been in Ireland for a long time and the creation of the Irish Tug of War Association in 1967 boosted the competition among clubs in Ireland and also enabled Ireland to compete in international events, such as the Tug of War International Federation (TWIF) World Championships.

=== Underwater sports ===
Diving the Skellig Islands, West of Ireland

Recreational diving, including scuba diving and snorkelling, started in Ireland in the early 1950s with the founding of the Belfast Branch of the British Sub Aqua Club. In the early 1960s, diving clubs in the Republic of Ireland formed the Comhairle Fo-Thuinn (CFT) (English: Irish Underwater Council). This voluntary body regulates all aspects of diving for its members, is the national governing body recognised by the Irish Government and represents the Republic of Ireland at the Confédération Mondiale des Activités Subaquatiques (World Underwater Federation). The Northern Ireland Federation of Sub-Aqua Clubs which was formed in 1975 is the corresponding national governing body in Northern Ireland.

As of October 2013, underwater hockey is the only underwater sport being practised. This activity is limited to the Republic of Ireland where regional competition takes place in both Dublin and Cork. Irish national teams have played internationally with attendance at European championships.

=== Volleyball ===
Volleyball has men's, women's, schools' and beach-volleyball participants. The sport is governed by Volleyball Ireland (VLY). The Northern Ireland Volleyball Association govern the sport in Northern Ireland. Club volleyball is played in several men's and women's divisions (both north and south). Volleyball Ireland (VLY) also run school competitions throughout the school year: a first and second year competition, a cadette competition, a senior competition, and a general schools competition. Spikeball tournaments are also held around the country throughout the school year.

=== Water sports ===
Water sports practised in Ireland include canoeing, swimming, surfing, diving, water polo, sailing, and kayaking. The National Aquatic Centre was opened in Ireland in 2003 and held the European SC Championships in December 2003 – the first time the country hosted such a competition. At the competition, Ireland won its first medal at the European SC Championships ever, a silver in the 200m breaststroke by Andrew Bree. The National Aquatic Centre also hosted the 2018 World Para Swimming European Championships. Successful Irish Olympic swimmers include Mona McSharry, who won a bronze medal in the 100 metre breaststroke at the 2024 Paris Olympics, and Daniel Wiffen, who won bronze in the 1500m freestyle and gold in the 800m freestyle at the same Olympics.

Swim Ireland is the national governing body of swimming in Ireland, while paddlesports are governed by Canoeing Ireland.

=== Winter Sports ===
The Ski Club of Ireland is the national snowsports centre for Ireland, and consists of four outdoor dry slopes in Kilternan, Dublin. A team representing Ireland has competed at the Winter Olympic Games since 1992.

== Competitions and events ==
=== National ===
The various GAA discipline finals are the largest sporting events regularly held in Ireland, in both terms of attendance and media coverage. The biggest national sporting event in Ireland is the final of the All-Ireland Senior Football Championship, held annually in Croke Park, usually in September. It usually attracts a sell out crowd of 82,500 to the stadium. Many of the matches in the championship attract crowds of 50,000+, depending on who is playing.

Aside from the GAA, the biggest multi-sport event held in Ireland regularly is the Community Games. The games are organised every year from a local level, where hundreds of thousands of young people compete in different disciplines such as athletics, swimming, and cycling, in the first half of the year. Winners progress to county level, and then to the Community Games finals. The finals are held over two weekends in the summer where over 3,000 children sleep over at a campus-style facility.

=== International ===
On an international level, Ireland has had mixed fortunes, with some successes in the late 20th and early 21st century in rugby union, horse racing, show jumping, amateur boxing, and golf.

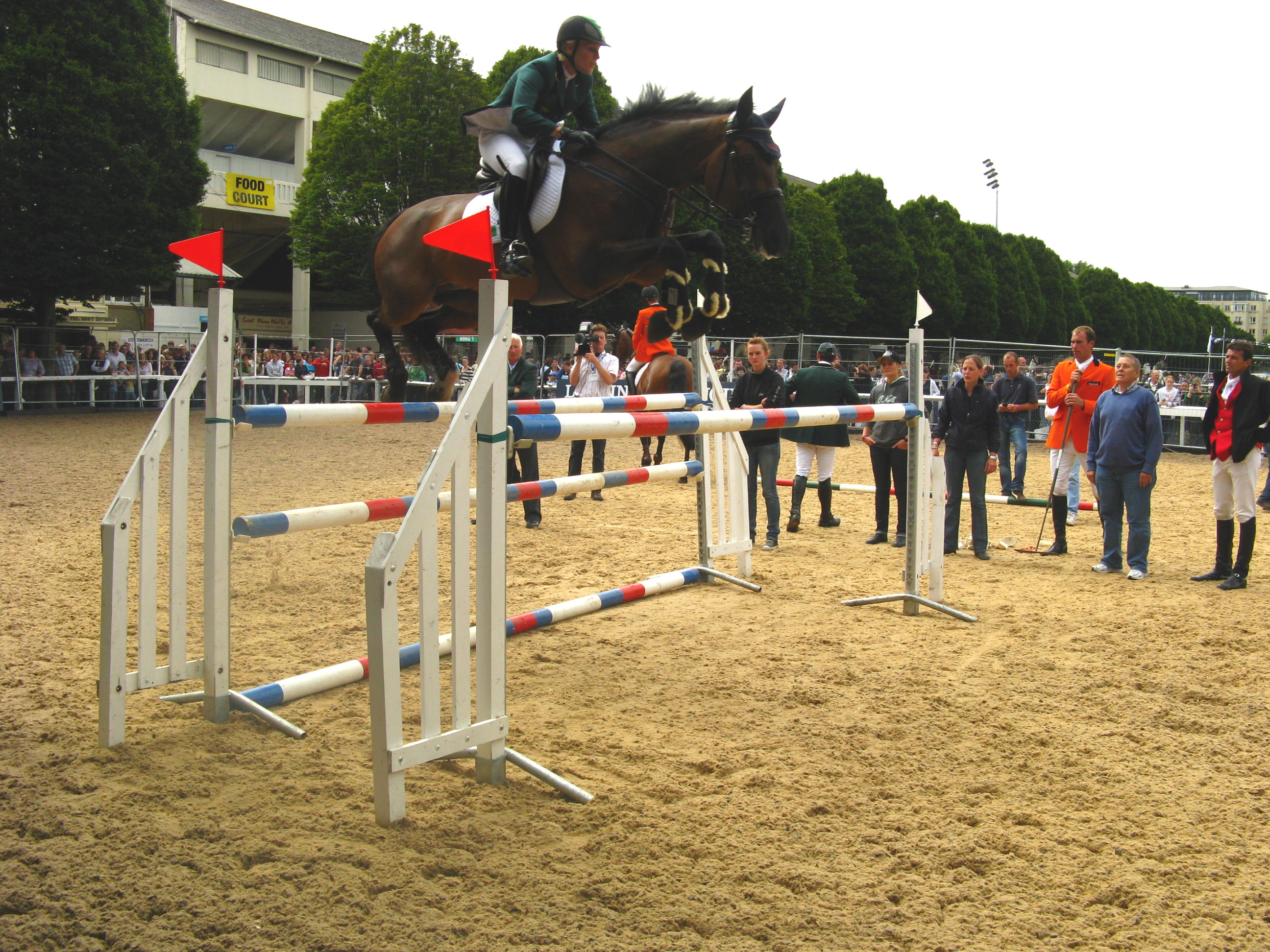
Showjumping at the 2008 Dublin Horse Show. The 1982 Show Jumping World Championships was held in Dublin.

Twenty four Irish people have won Olympic medals as of 2012. At the 2004 Summer Olympics, Ireland had one of its smallest contingents in its history at the games, with only 106 individuals participating.

One of the biggest international events in Ireland is international soccer. The Republic's national team first qualified for a FIFA World Cup in 1990, reaching the quarter-finals of Italia '90. In rugby union, as of September 2019, Ireland's national team was ranked 1st in the world. Ireland has produced major stars such as Keith Wood, Brian O'Driscoll and Johnny Sexton. In golf, Ireland has produced top golfers such as Pádraig Harrington.

The traditional Gaelic games of Gaelic football and hurling are played by Irish expats, with increasingly local involvement in communities around the world, however no nation has enough players to compete with Ireland. To compensate for this the GAA has entered into a partnership with the Australian Football League (Australian rules football) and plays a hybrid annual series called International rules football – this series has been going in various forms since 1967. Also the GAA plays an international hurling hybrid match with Scotland's national shinty team (although Ireland do not select players from the best hurling teams in Tier One of the All-Ireland championship for this game).

In 2003, Ireland hosted the Special Olympics World Summer Games, as well as the European SC Championships 2003. In 2006, Ireland hosted the Ryder Cup Matches.

== Stadiums ==
Ireland's largest stadium is the GAA's Croke Park in Dublin, which can hold 82,300 people. It is the third largest stadium in Europe. Until the late 20th century, it was only used for Gaelic games and concerts. Other GAA facilities capable of accommodating 40,000 or more people are Semple Stadium, Thurles, Gaelic Grounds, Limerick and Páirc Uí Chaoimh, Cork.

International soccer and rugby in the Republic of Ireland are played at the 52,000 capacity Aviva Stadium. Built on the site of the former Lansdowne Road, this all-seated stadium was opened in May 2010. Thomond Park, a rugby ground in Limerick, has been rebuilt into a 26,000-capacity stadium, though not all-seated.

Ireland has three Olympic-sized swimming pools – two of which are open to the public. The largest – located at the National Sports Campus – is the National Aquatic Centre. Ireland has a number of horse and greyhound tracks such as Fairyhouse.

Plans to develop a Northern Ireland stadium at the site of the former Maze prison in County Antrim to cater for Gaelic games, rugby and soccer were scrapped in 2009 after opposition from unionists and soccer fans.

The Ireland national cricket team play One Day Internationals at Stormont in Belfast and at the Clontarf Cricket Club Ground in Dublin. Ireland also plays Intercontinental Cup matches at the Woodvale Road ground, and has played test cricket at Malahide Cricket Club Ground in Dublin.

== Media coverage ==
- Newspapers: All major newspapers dedicate space to sports coverage, particularly to soccer, Gaelic games, rugby union and equestrian events.
- Television: Gaelic football, hurling and soccer receive most of the sports coverage on domestic channels. RTÉ Two and TG4 hold rights to broadcast Gaelic games in Ireland. Coverage of the League of Ireland is shared between RTÉ and other channels. TV3 and RTÉ Two both have rights to various European soccer competitions, such as the Champions League and the English Premier League. Satellite and cable subscribers have access to international channels such as Sky Sports, Eurosport and Attheraces.
- Magazines: There are relatively few Irish based magazines apart from GAA ones such as the Hogan Stand.

== Student sport ==
Within third-level institutions in the Republic of Ireland, sport is overseen by Student Sport Ireland (SSI). Universities in Northern Ireland also participate in British Universities and Colleges Sport (BUCS) competitions.

SSI, the governing body for third level-sport in Ireland, was originally known as the Colleges and Universities Sports Association of Ireland (CUSAI). It was formed in 2005 following the merger of the Irish Student Sports Association and the Council of University Sports Administrators in Ireland, and renamed to Student Sport Ireland in 2013. It receives some financial support from Sport Ireland, and is a member of the European University Sports Association (EUSA). SSI, which had three full-time employees based at the National Sports Campus as of 2025, coordinates participation in international programmes, including the multi sport FISU World University Games (or Universiade) and FISU Championships. It also assists third level institutions and other sports governing bodies to develop competition and recreation programmes.

== See also ==
- All-Ireland championships
- Culture of Ireland
- Sport in Northern Ireland
