= British Octopush Association =

National body for underwater hockey in the United Kingdom

- Abbreviation: BOA
- Predecessor: BSAC
- Formation: 1976
- Type: NGO
- Purpose: National body for underwater hockey in Great Britain
- Headquarters: VSS PO Box 28 Sanquhar DG4 6WW
- Region served: United Kingdom
- Chairman: Phil Thompson
- Vice Chairman: Richard Adams
- Secretary: Samantha Marlowe
- Treasurer: Peter Hornby
- Key people: Cliff Underwood (founder)
- Affiliations: BUSA; BSAC
- Website: http://www.gbuwh.co.uk

British Octopush Association (BOA) is the governing body for underwater hockey in Great Britain.

== Organisation ==
The BOA is an organisation based on individual members rather than on clubs. It is managed by a committee elected from the membership. It provides competition at national level and the opportunity to play internationally. It also provides coaching and refereeing courses for its members. In July 2013 the BOA entered in an affiliation agreement with the British Sub-Aqua Club (BSAC) in order to improve its recognition as a national governing body (NGB) and to access a range of services including checking services required by child protection legislation.

== Origins ==
The BOA was formed in 1976 to directly control and develop the sport. Prior to the creation of the BOA, underwater hockey competitions had been conducted since the 1950s under the auspices of the BSAC. In 1977 the BSAC in its role as the NGB for underwater activities (also called sub aqua) recognised the BOA as the controlling body for the sport in the UK.

== See also ==
- British Underwater Sports Association – National sporting association
- Underwater Hockey Wales – Welsh underwater hockey association
