= Northern Ireland Federation of Sub-Aqua Clubs =

National governing body for recreational diving and underwater sport in Northern Ireland

The Northern Ireland Federation of Sub-Aqua Clubs (NIFSAC) is the National Governing Body (NGB) for Sub Aqua in Northern Ireland. Sub Aqua is a broad term encompassing both recreational underwater activities such as recreational diving and snorkelling, and competitive underwater activities such as underwater hockey.

It was formed in 1975 at the request of the Sports Council for Northern Ireland (now Sport Northern Ireland) to ensure that clubs affiliated to either the British Sub-Aqua Club (BSAC) and the Comhairle Fo-Thuinn (English: Irish Underwater Council) (CFT) would be eligible to apply for its grants. In the absence of a local sports governing body, the Sports Council for Northern Ireland could only recognise the BSAC as the official governing body with the potential for clubs affiliated to the CFT being excluded from access to its services. The foundation of the NIFSAC is attributed to Dr Douglas Boyd, who served as its inaugural President and who is acknowledged for his effort in obtaining agreement from both the BSAC and CFT and for preparing a draft constitution acceptable to all parties.

== See also ==
- Sport in Ireland
