= South African Underwater Sports Federation =

Sports governing body in South Africa

- Abbreviation: SAUSF
- Type: NGO
- Purpose: International representation
- Region served: South Africa
- Affiliations: CMAS; SASCOC
- Website: www.sausf.co.za

The South African Underwater Sports Federation (SAUSF) is the official CMAS (World Underwater Federation) representative in the Republic of South Africa, and is affiliated to the South African Sports Confederation and Olympic Committee (SASCOC).

Formerly known as the South African Underwater Union (SAUU), the SAUSF has been responsible for the administrative duties of all underwater sports in South Africa. This originally included boating in connection with diving, and scuba training and recreational diving, but these two aspects of underwater sport developed into commercial activities and split from the SAUU to SASCA and CMAS-ISA respectively, whereas the competitive amateur sports like underwater hockey, spearfishing, finswimming and free diving remained with SAUU.

== Member organisations ==
- South African Underwater Fishing Federation (SAUFF)
- South African Underwater Hockey Federation (SAUWHF)
- South African Underwater Orienteering Federation
- South African Underwater Rugby Federation (SAURF)
