= Federación Española de Actividades Subacuáticas =

Spanish national federation for underwater activities, affiliated to CMAS

- Abbreviation: FEDAS
- Predecessor: Federación Española de Pesca y Actividades Subacuáticas
- Formation: 1967
- Type: NGO
- Purpose: Underwater Sports & Sciences, and diver training Sport governing body
- Headquarters: Barcelona
- Region served: Spain
- President: Xavier Duran Soler (2012)
- Affiliations: CMAS; CMAS Europe
- Website: fedas.es

The Spanish Federation of Underwater Activities (Spanish: Federación Española de Actividades Subacuáticas, FEDAS) is the governing body in the field of Spanish aquatic sports. As of 2023, the federation has 897 registered clubs and 31,828 federated athletes.

It is a voting member of the Confédération Mondiale des Activités Subaquatiques (CMAS) .

== History ==
After World War II, there was a large increase in underwater sports in Spain, including scuba diving and spear fishing. In response, The National Office of Physical Education and Sports (the official body governing sports in Spain at that time) ordered the creation of "The Underwater Activities Committee" in 1947. The organization was initially integrated into the Spanish Federation of Fishing, taking the name of the Spanish Federation of Fishing and Underwater.

In 1959, the CMAS Underwater Committee along with other National Federations took part in the creation of a new international organization. In March 1967, due to the extraordinary importance reached by underwater activities in Spain, the Committee became independent from the Fisheries Federation, taking the name of the Spanish Federation of Underwater Activities (FEDAS).

Today it is the official body that governs spearfishing, scuba diving, finswimming, underwater orienteering, underwater photography, Underwater Hockey, Diving and Underwater Rugby competitions in Spain. In addition to recreational diving, Spain has numerous schools which organize scuba diving expeditions to further underwater archaeological research. The first autonomous immersion Spanish club (CRIS) was founded in 1952 in Barcelona. Since then, the number of Clubs and Centres has increased dramatically.

Beyond scuba diving, other activities such as swimming with fins and underwater orientation have been developed, including participation in international competition. There have also been great achievements in underwater photography, with people like Xavier Safont, Carlos Minguell, Carles Virgili or Jose Luis Gonzalez, among others, having reached the highest podium of the World Championship of Underwater Photography.

Other recently invented underwater sports such as Underwater Hockey, Underwater Rugby and Sport Diving competitions, are beginning to grow internationally as well.

== Organization ==
FEDAS is currently organised into nine sports committees, a technical committee and three departments.

=== Sports committees ===
- Apnea
- Hunting photo apnea
- Sport Diving
- Underwater Hockey
- Underwater Photo and Video.
- Finswimming
- Underwater orienteering
- Spearfishing
- Underwater Rugby

=== Technical Committee ===
The Technical Committee oversees the operation of the FEDAS diver training program (known as the National Diving School or Escuela Nacional De Buceo Deportivo).

=== Departments ===
- Judges and referees.
- Medical Committee.
- Scientific Diving.

== Regional Federations ==
Each autonomous community (including the autonomous cities of Ceuta and Melilla) has its own federation. These federations operate their own administrations and organize their own competitions, but must adhere to state regulations from the Spanish Federation is. The regional federations are:

- Andalusia.
- Aragon.
- Balerares.
- Canary.
- Cantabria.
- Castile and León.
- Castilla-La Mancha.
- Catalonia.
- Valencia.
- Ceuta.
- Extremadura.
- Galicia.
- Community of Madrid.
- Melilla.
- Navarra.
- Asturias.
- Region of Murcia.
- Basque Country.

=== Delegations ===
- Rioja
