= Confédération Mondiale des Activités Subaquatiques =

International organisation for underwater activities

- Abbreviation: CMAS
- Predecessor: CIPS, Comité des Sports Sous-Marins
- Formation: January 11, 1959; 67 years ago at Monaco
- Type: Sports federation; INGO; Diver training organization
- Purpose: Underwater sports & sciences, and diver training
- Headquarters: Rome, Italy
- Location: Viale Tiziano, 74 00196 Roma Italy
- Region served: International
- Members: National Federations
- Official language: French, English, Spanish
- Leader: Anna Arzhanova
- Key people: Jacques-Yves Cousteau
- Main organ: General assembly
- Affiliations: SportAccord; ARISF; IWGA; IUCN
- Staff: 5
- Website: www.cmas.org

Confédération Mondiale des Activités Subaquatiques (CMAS; English: World Underwater Federation) is an international federation that represents underwater activities in underwater sport and underwater sciences, and oversees an international system of recreational snorkel and scuba diver training and recognition. Its foundation in Monaco during January 1959 makes it one of the world's oldest underwater diving organisations.

== Origins ==
An international congress of diving federations representing all underwater disciplines met in Brussels on 28 September 1958. National delegates attended from following countries: Belgium, Brazil, France, the Federal Republic of Germany, Greece, Italy, Monaco, Portugal, Switzerland, the United States of America and the former Yugoslavia. Following a decision at that congress, a meeting was held in Monaco on 9–11 January 1959, which officially established the World Underwater Federation, with an acronym based on its French title as CMAS.

A founding member and key proponent of CMAS was the French underwater explorer and diving pioneer Jacques-Yves Cousteau who was chosen to be the inaugural president with Luigi Ferraro, Italian underwater pioneer, appointed as vice-president.

CMAS succeeded the Comité des Sports Sous-Marins (Underwater Sports Committee) of the Confédération Internationale de la Pêche Sportive (CIPS) (International Confederation of Sport Fishing), which was founded on 22 February 1952.

== Organisation ==
CMAS consists of three major committees – sport, technical and scientific. These committees are overseen by a board of directors (BoD) elected periodically at the annually convened general assembly. The BoD, the sport committee and the scientific committee oversee sub-committees known as commissions. Day-to-day operation is overseen by a steering committee appointed from the BoD. Its headquarters is currently located in Rome.

=== The steering committee ===
The steering committee consists of eight members. Since may 2025 (GA in Egypt), the members are:

- President – Anna Arzhanova (Serbia)
- Secretary general – Kevin O'Shaughnessy (Ireland)
- Vice president – Frédéric Di Méglio (France)
- Vice president – Jean-Marc Goiran (Monaco)
- President sports committee – Michel Gaunard (France)
- President technical committee – Alain Foret (France)
- President scientific committee – John Geurts (Holland)
- Treasurer – Ilias Xiarchos (Greece)

== Sport committee ==
CMAS Sports Committee is the world governing body of 11 underwater sports:

- Aquathlon
- Freediving
- Finswimming
- Spearfishing
- Sport diving
- Underwater hockey
- Underwater orienteering
- Underwater parasports
- Underwater rugby
- Underwater target shooting
- Visual (Underwater photography and Underwater videography)

Across these sports, CMAS organises the several world championships:

Year in brackets () denotes inaugural event

- Underwater Orienteering World Championships (1973)
- Finswimming World Championships (1976)
- Underwater Hockey World Championships (1980)
- Underwater Rugby World Championships (1980)
- Underwater Photography World Championships (1985)

In 2007, CMAS organised the inaugural CMAS World Games in attempt to boost popularity of underwater sports by hosting all world championships as one event. However, this ultimately failed as it brought too many sports outside of their pre-established calendars, resulting in the 2007 event being the only one ever organised and played.

== Technical committee ==
=== Role ===
The role of the technical committee is the provision of "safe diving for CMAS members" and seeks to achieve this by "promoting world class standards for all aspects of Scuba Diving and ensuring adherence of them by member federations and dive providers". Its officers who are elected from persons nominated at the CMAS General Assembly by affiliated national diving federations include the following positions – president, secretary, standards director, education director, technical director, diving security director, special tasks director and a number of general members. It oversees the two following systems – a diver training standards system known as the "CMAS International Diver Training Standards" and a certification system known as "CMAS International Diver Certificates".

Since CMAS effectively started as a volunteer organisation for hobbyists, its courses tend to reflect the full range of European and world diving standards. Compared to other diving organisations which may be more geared towards holiday and tropical water diving, and while organisations like PADI or SSI tend to bring divers into the water immediately, CMAS entry-level training is more extensive, featuring more "classroom" delivered theory.

=== Qualifications ===
==== Standards, certification and training delivery ====
The CMAS Technical Committee has developed a qualification system currently known as the "CMAS International Diver Training Standards" which consists of published universal standards for recreational diving, technical diving and leadership diver grades.

The CMAS Technical Committee has also developed a diving certification system called the "CMAS International Diver Training Certification System" for most of its diver training standards and which permits divers that have been trained in accordance with the CMAS International Diver Training Standards, to have their training recognised worldwide particularly in countries where CMAS affiliated federations exist. The system includes a double sided certification card format where one side depicts the achieved CMAS standard while the other side has details of the issuing organisation and the diver.

CMAS itself does not provide training or conduct the issuing of certifications – this is available from two sources. Firstly, from national diving federations affiliated to the CMAS Technical Committee using their member diving clubs, their member instructors where the federation is exclusively an instructor organisation or by agreement with independent underwater diving training organizations operating in the countries where those federations are based. Secondly, from specially accredited dive centres known as "CMAS Dive Centers" (CDC) who use dedicated CMAS training materials.

==== Recreational diver training programmes ====
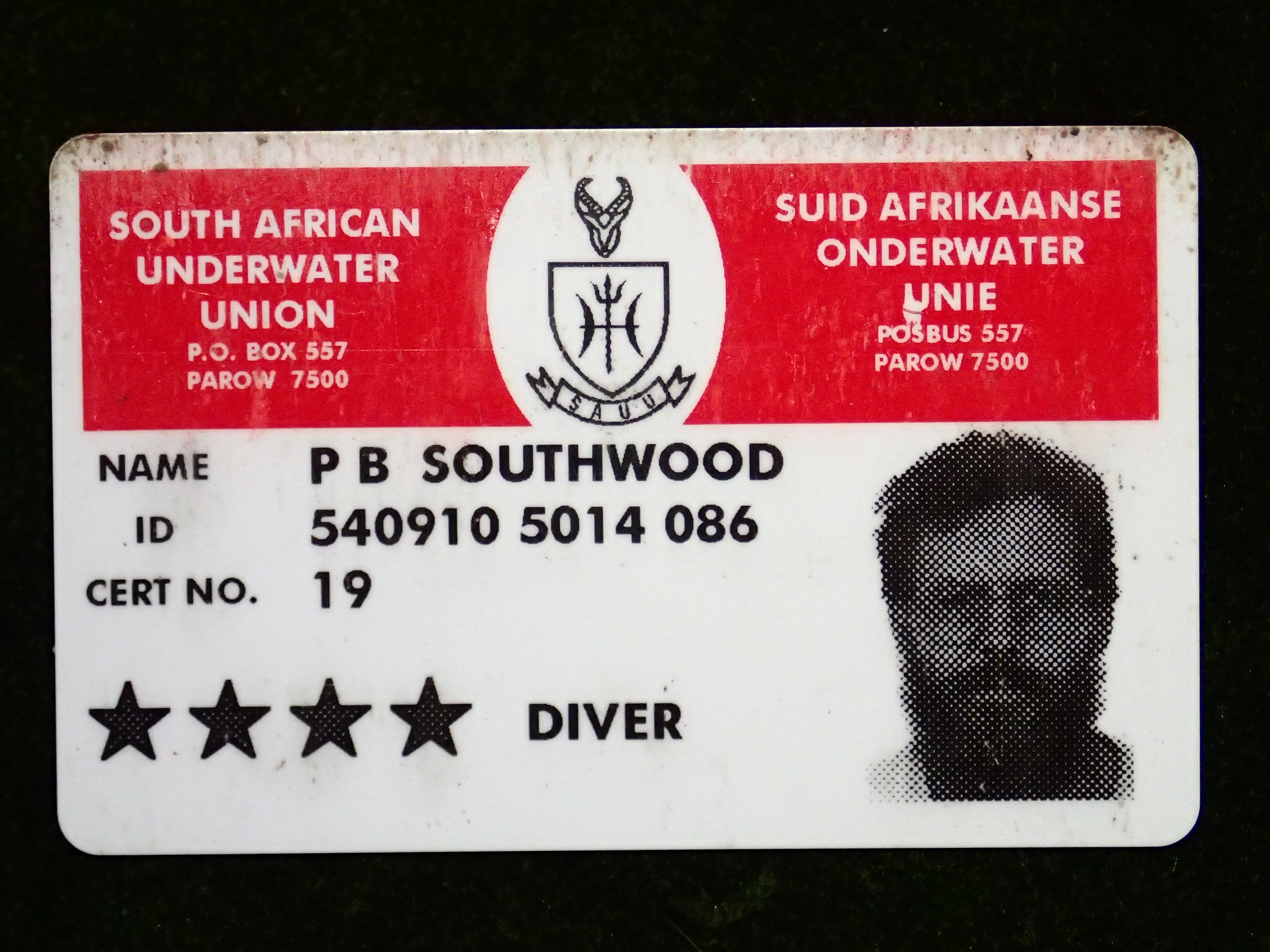
CMAS four-star diver certification card issued by South African Underwater Union, the South African affiliate in the 1980s, which later became the South African Underwater Sports Federation and CMAS Instructors South Africa, the current South African federations.

Standards are offered for recreational diver training for the following grades of scuba and snorkel divers.

- Introductory SCUBA Experience – "this training programme aims at providing interested persons with an introductory diving experience, to a maximum depth of ten (10) metres under the direct supervision of a CMAS Instructor, whilst using air as a breathing gas, in a safe manner."
- One Star Diver – "a diver who is competent in the safe and correct use of all appropriate open water scuba diving equipment in a sheltered water training area and is ready to gain open water diving experience in the company of an experienced diver."
- Two Star Diver – "a diver who has gained some open water diving experience and is considered ready to take part in dives partnered by a diver of at least the same or a higher grade. The two-star diver may dive with a One Star Diver in sheltered shallow water."
- Three Star Diver – "a fully trained, experienced, senior diver who is considered competent to supervise other divers of any grade in open water and support an instructor in the pool and open water training."
- Four Star Diver – "a three-star diver who has attained a higher than average level of knowledge and ability supported by broad diving experience. They are able to assist in the training of One Star Divers and be competent to lead divers in order to accomplish major diving tasks or project objectives."

Snorkelling

- One Star Snorkel Diver – "a snorkel diver who is competent in the safe and correct use of relevant snorkel diving equipment used in a swimming pool or sheltered water. The snorkel diver is familiar with relevant personal equipment and its use in a sheltered open water area. The snorkel diver is ready to gain further open water training."
- Two Star Snorkel Diver – "a snorkel diver who has gained some open water diving experience. The snorkel diver is considered ready to take part in dives with other snorkel divers, under supervision if a minor. The CMAS 2 star snorkel diver is considered trained."
- Three Star Snorkel Diver – "A fully trained snorkel diver who has gained considerable experience in open water snorkel diving under various conditions. The three-star snorkel diver has acquired life-saving skills and can lead snorkel divers in open water dives."

==== Speciality diver training programmes ====
Standards are provided for the following speciality training for recreational divers:

- Apnoea Diver Level I
- Apnoea Diver Level II
- Apnoea Diver Level III
- Disabled Diver: Open Water Diving Environment Level I
- Disabled Diver: Open Water Diving Environment Level II
- Disabled Diver: Open Water Diving Environment Level III
- Enriched Air Nitrox Diver – Recreational diving qualification to dive using oxygen enriched air
- Drysuit Diver – Certification for diving in a dry suit
- Altitude Diver – Diver qualification for the skills to decompress at altitude
- Underwater Navigation – Techniques for navigating underwater
- Search and Recovery Diver
- Ice Diver – Certification as competent to scuba dive under ice
- Compressor Operator
- Nitrox Gas Blender – Person competent to blend nitrox for scuba diving
- Trimix Gas Blender – Person competent to blend trimix breathing gases for scuba diving
- Cave Diver Level I (Cavern Diver)
- Recreational Scooter Diver
- Cardiopulmonary resuscitation (CPR) and Basic life support (BLS])
- Oxygen Administration
- Rescue Diver – Recreational scuba certification emphasising emergency response and diver rescue
- Recreational Trimix Diver
- Semi-Closed Rebreather Diver
- Advanced Semi-Closed Rebreather Diver
- Closed Circuit Rebreather Diver
- Children Diving Bronze Award
- Children Diving Gold Award
- Children Diving Silver Award
- Wreck Diver Level 1: – Autonomous, recreational, non-penetration wreck diving.
- Wreck Diver Level 2:– Autonomous, recreational, penetration wreck diving.
- Self-Rescue Diver – Scuba gas planning skills, bailout to emergency gas supply carried by the diver, management of multiple gas cylinders, deployment of a decompression buoy from depth, tethered buoyant emergency ascent, use of long hose regulator, self-release from entanglement, and use of backup diving equipment.

==== Technical diver training programmes ====
Standards are provided for the following technical diver training grades:

- Advanced Nitrox Diver – Technical diving qualification to use multiple mixtures of oxygen enriched air
- Advanced Semi-Closed Rebreather Diver
- Cave Diver Level II (Apprentice Cave Diver)
- Cave Diver Level III (Full Cave Diver)
- Extended Range Nitrox Diver
- Normoxic Trimix Diver
- Overhead environment Scooter
- Technical Scooter Diver
- Trimix Diver
- Advanced Trimix Diver

==== Leadership diver training programmes ====
Standards are provided for the training of the following grades of recreational snorkel and scuba instructors:

- One Star Snorkel Diver Instructor – "a CMAS 2 star snorkel diver who is interested in and has knowledge of practical snorkel diver instruction. The instructor is qualified to conduct practical lessons in a swimming pool and to teach the CMAS 1 star snorkel diver certificate. The instructor can be used as an assistant instructor in open water, but cannot plan an open water dive and lead a group of divers on his own."
- Two Star Snorkel Diver Instructor – "an experienced one-star snorkel diver instructor who has the knowledge, skills, and experience required to lead and instruct 1, 2 and 3 Star snorkel diver students in the classroom, swimming pool, and open water. The experienced CMAS 2 Star snorkel diver instructor may assist in the training and education of CMAS 1 Star snorkel diver instructors."
- One Star Instructor – "a three- or four-star diver who has demonstrated a knowledge of the techniques of diving instruction and has proven, under evaluation, to be competent in practical instructional skills and diving safety procedures: They are qualified to train and certify novice diving students in a full CMAS One-Star Diver scuba program."
- Two Star Instructor – "an experienced one-star instructor who has the knowledge, skills, and experience required to teach groups of divers in the classroom, pool, and in open water, and to train qualified dive supervisors, assistant instructors and assist in the training & evaluation of One-Star Instructors. They are qualified to teach and certify all CMAS diver levels including snorkel instructor levels."
- Three Star Instructor – "a highly experienced two-star instructor who is competent to train all grades of divers and instructors and able to take responsibility for instructor certification programs and the conduct of diving schools/centres and specialised training courses or events."

==== Instructor speciality grades ====
Standards are provided for speciality training of assistants, dive supervisors, snorkel instructors and scuba instructors:

- Apnoea Instructor
- Instructors Assistant for Disabled Divers
- Instructor for Disabled Divers
- Instructor Trainer for Disabled Divers
- Nitrox Instructor
- Advanced Nitrox Instructor
- Nitrox Instructor Three Star
- Ice Diver Instructor
- Trimix Instructor
- Advanced Trimix Instructor
- Nitrox Gas Blender Instructor
- Trimix Gas Blender Instructor
- Cave Diving Instructor I (Cavern Diving Instructor)
- Cave Diving Instructor II (Full Cave Diving Instructor)
- Cave Diving Instructor III (Cave Diving Staff Instructor)
- Recreational Scooter Assistant
- Technical Scooter Assistant
- Overhead Environment Scooter Assistant
- Recreational Scooter Instructor
- Technical Scooter Instructor
- Overhead Environment Scooter Instructor
- Semi-Closed Rebreather Instructor
- Advanced Semi-Closed Rebreather
- Closed Circuit Rebreather Instructor
- Children Diving Dive Leader
- Children Diving Instructor
- Children Diving Instructor Trainer

== Scientific committee ==
=== Role ===
The committee considers its main task is to bring to the attention of the world underwater diving community, the important issues concerning the marine environment and how divers can play a major role in protecting it by serving as frontline observers of its overall health, particularly in respect to invasive species, coastal ecosystems and biodiversity. Its officers who are elected from persons nominated at the CMAS General Assembly by affiliated national diving federations include the following positions – president, secretary, a number of general members and presidents of the following commissions – marine biology, marine archaeology, geology and professional relationships.

=== Scientific diving codes ===
Over a 10-year period from 1977, the CMAS Scientific Committee was responsible for the development of the "Code of Practice for Scientific Diving" for UNESCO in cooperation with Sea Grant.

=== Qualifications ===
The CMAS Scientific Committee oversees a system of diving standards and certification that operates in parallel to the CMAS International Diver Training Certification System. The system was developed to which recognize the status of a diver who is qualified to dive in the course of research whilst employed. This internationally recognized standard of competence is a distinct advantage for working scientists who wish to travel between laboratories and institutes in different countries. Known as the CMAS Scientific Diver Standard, the system consists of the following diver and instructor grades:

- CMAS Scientific Diver (CSD) (pre-requisite of CMAS 2 Star Diver plus scientific diver training)
- CMAS Advanced Scientific Diver (CASD) (pre-requisite of CMAS 3 Star Diver plus advanced scientific diver training)
- CMAS Scientific Diving Instructor (pre-requisite: CMAS 2 Star Instructor)
- CMAS Confirmed Scientific Diving Instructor (pre-requisite: CMAS 3 Star Instructor)

A programme of specialist courses both at entry and advanced levels in underwater archaeology, freshwater biology, marine biology, marine geology and oceanology is also offered. Training and certification (also known as brevets) for the above qualifications is available from organisations known as CMAS Scientific Centres (CSC).

== Recognitions, agreements and affiliations ==
=== Recognitions ===
Organisations which recognise CMAS as the international federation for underwater sport and activities include:

- International Olympic Committee (IOC)
- UNESCO
- SportAccord (formerly General Association of International Sports Federations (GAISF))
- World Games
- World Anti-Doping Agency (WADA)

=== Agreements ===
- Agreement with the International Life Saving Federation (ILSF) was signed on 21 October 1994 regarding recognition of ILSF's rescue diver and instructors.
- Agreement with the Professional Association of Diving Instructors (PADI) was signed on 30 January 1998 in Anaheim regarding a system of recognition for scuba divers moving between the CMAS and PADI training schemes.
- Agreement with the Nautical Archaeology Society (NAS) was signed on 27 April 2002 in Brussels to 'explore the possibilities of cooperation between NAS and CMAS in the field of underwater archaeology' including "exchange of information" and mutual recognition of training programs.

=== Affiliations ===
- International Union for Conservation of Nature (IUCN)

== Member federations ==
In Feb 2024, 105 nations:

- Africa: 15 nations
- America: 15 nations
- Asia: 27 nations
- Europe: 40 nations
- Oceania: 3 nations

CMAS membership consists of at least 130 national federations from five continents:

Africa	America (North and South)	Asia	Europe	Oceania
Algeria (Fédération Algerienne De Sauvetage De Secourisme Et Des Activites Subaquatiques); Cape Verde (Federacao Cabo Verde Desportivo Subm. José Maria Aquatico Herrer); Djibouti (Federation Djiboutienne De Sports Subaquatiques); Egypt (Egyptian Underwater & Lifesaving Federation); Kenya (Kenya Lifesaving Federation); Madagascar (Fédération Malgache De Plongée Sous Marinem); Morocco (Federation Royale Marocaine De Plongée Et Activites Subaquatiques); Mauritius (Mauritian Scuba Diving Association); Namibia (Namibia Underwater Federation); Seychelles (Scuba Divers Federation Of Seychelles); Seychelles (Submarine Activity Federation Seychelles); South Africa (CMAS Instructors South Africa (CMAS-ISA); South Africa (South African Underwater Sports Federation (SAUSF)); Tunisia (Fédération Des Activites Subaquatiques De Tunisie); Tunisia (Fédération Tunisienne Des Pêches Sportives)	Argentina (FederaciÓn Argentina De Actividades Subacuaticas); Argentina (Asociación De Hockey Subacuático De Argentina); Brazil (Confederaço Brasileira De Pesca E Desportos SubaquÁticos); Canada (Canadian Underwater Games Association); Canada (Association Des Moniteurs De La Cmas Qc); Canada (Canadian Diving Program); Chile (Federación Deportiva Nacional De Actividades Subacuáticas Y Salvamento Acuático); Colombia (Federacion Colombiana De Actividades Subauaticas); Cuba (Federacion Cubana De Actividades Subacuaticuas); Ecuador (Federación Ecuatoriana De Buceo Y Actividades Subacuaticas); Mexico (Federacion Mexicana De Actividades Subacuaticas A.C.); Mexico (International Diving Instructors Mexico); Peru (Federacion Deportiva Peruana De Actividades Subacuaticas); United States (United States Underwater Sport Federation); United States (U.S. Freediving Federation); United States (Underwater Society Of America); Uruguay (Federacion Uruguaya De Actividades Subacuaticas); Venezuela (Federacion Venezolana De Actividades Subacuaticas)	China (Chinese Underwater Association); Hong Kong (Hong Kong Underwater Association); India (Underwater Sport Association India); Indonesia (Indonesian Subaquatic Sport Association); Iran (Islamic Republic Of Iran Lifesaving Federation); Israel (Israeli Diving Federation); Japan (Japan Cmas Instructor Association); Japan (Japan Underwater Sports Federation); Japan (Japan Educational Facilities Federation); Japan (Jcs); Japan (Marine Techno Educational System Diving Division); Japan (Kansai Sports Diving Federation Japan); Jordan (Royal Jordanian Marine Sports Federation); Kazakhstan (Underwater Federation Republic Of Kazakhstan); Kuwait (Kuwait Academy For Diving & Swimming); Kuwait (Kuwait Diving And Lifesaving Committee); Kyrgyzstan (Kyrgyz Underwater Federation); Lebanon (Lebanon Water Festival); Malaysia (Malayan Sub Aqua Club); Malaysia (Malaysia Coastal Subaquatic Federation); Maldives (Maldives Underwater Federation); Northern Mariana Islands (Toa Engineering Corporation); Palestine (Palestinian Swimming & Aquatic Sport Federation); Philippines (Philippine Federation Of Cmas Underwater Activities); Philippines (Philippine Association On Underwater Activities); Saudi Arabia (Saudi Arabia Maritime Sports Federation); Singapore (Singapore Underwater Federation); South Korea (Asia Diving Council); South Korea (Korea Underwater Association); Syria (Syrian Underwater Sport Federation); Chinese Taipei (Chinese Taipei Underwater Federation); Chinese Taipei (Taiwan Technical & Science Diving Association); Thailand (Association Of Thailand Underwater Sports); United Arab Emirates (Fujairah International Marine Club); Vietnam (Vietnam Aquatic Sports Association)	Armenia (Armenian Federation Of Underwater Sports); Austria (Austrian Diving Federation); Belarus (Belarus Federation Of Underwater Sport); Belgium (Royal Belgian Diving Federation); Belgium (Groupe Belge De Recherches Scientifiques Sous-Marines); Bosnia and Herzegovina (Diving Association Of Bosnia And Herzegovina); Bulgaria (Bulgarian National Association Of Underwater Activity); Bulgaria (Federation Bulgare De Peche Sous Marine); Croatia (Croatian Diving Federation); Croatia (Croatian Federation Of Sports Fishing On Sea); Cyprus (Cyprus Federation Of Underwater Activities); Czech Republic (Divers Association Of Czech Republic); Denmark (Danish Sports Diver Federation); Estonia (Estonian Underwater Federation); Finland (Finnish Divers' Federation); France (Fédération française d'études et de sports sous-marins); Georgia (Georgian Underwater Sports Federation); Germany (Verband Deutscher Sporttaucher E.V.); Greece (Hellenic Federation For Underwater Activities & Sportfishing); Greece (Hellenic Swimming Federation); Hungary (Hungarian Divers Federation); Hungary (Underwater Explorers' Federation); Ireland (Irish Underwater Federation); Italy (Federazione Italiana Pesca Sportiva E Attivita Subacquee); Italy (Comitato Italiano Ricerche Studi Subaquei); Italy (International Academy Of Underwater Sciences And Techniques); Italy (Nadd Global Diving Agency); Italy (Asd Acqua Team); Italy (Union Italienne Sport Pour Tous); Italy (Associazione Cmas Diving Center Italia); Italy (Associaziona Nazionale Istruttori Subacquei); Italy (Federazione Italiana Attivita Subacquee); Italy (Federazione Italiana Sport Acquatici); Italy (Asi-Alleanza Sportiva Italiana Divisione Subacquea); Italy (Esa Worldwide); Italy (Albatros Progetto Paolo Pinto); Latvia (Cmas Baltic Sporta Biedrtba); Latvia (Latviajas Zemudens Sporta Federacija); Liechtenstein (Liechtensteiner Tauchsport Verband); Lithuania (Lithuanian Underwater Sport Federation); Luxembourg (Federation Luxembourgeoise); North Macedonia (Macedonian Diving Federation); Malta (Federation Of Underwater Activities Malta); Moldova (Federation Of Underwater Activities Of The Republic Of Moldova); Monaco (Federation Monegasque Des Activites Subaquatiques); Montenegro (Diving Association Of Montenegro); Netherlands (Nederlandse Onderwatersport Bond); Norway (Norwegian Diving Federation); Poland (Underwater Activity Commission Polish Tourist Country-Lovers Society); Poland (Polish Underwater Federation); Poland (Commission Diving Nationale Defense League); Portugal (Federation Portugaise D'Activites Subaquatiques); Russia (Russian Underwater Federation); San Marino (Federazione Sammarinese Attivita Subacquee); Serbia (Serbian Underwater Association); Slovakia (Slovak Diving Association); Slovenia (Slovenian Diving Federation); Spain (Federacion Espanola De Actividades Subacuaticas); Sweden (Swedish Sportsdiving Federation); Switzerland (Schweizer Unterwassersport-Verband); Switzerland (Cmas.Ch); Turkey (Turkish Underwater Sports Federation); Ukraine (Public Organization Ukrainian Federation Of Underwater Sport And Underwater Activities); United Kingdom (Sub-Aqua Association); United Kingdom (British Spearfishing Association)	Australia (Australian Underwater Federation); New Zealand (New Zealand Underwater Association); Tahiti (Fédération Tahitienne De Sports Subaquatique De Compétition)

== See also ==
=== General ===
- List of diver certification organizations – Agencies which issue certification for competence in diving skills

=== Key people ===
- Frédéric Dumas – French pioneer of scuba diving (1913–1991)
- Philippe Tailliez – French pioneer of scuba diving and underwater photographer

=== Organisations ===
- CMAS Europe – Non-profit branch of the world underwater federation representing European affiliates
- Scuba Educators International – Recreational diver training and certification agency
- YMCA SCUBA Program – Defunct recreational diver training and certification agency

=== Sport ===
- Finswimming World Championships – International event for the underwater sport of finswimming
- Underwater Hockey World Championships – International event for the sport of Underwater Hockey
- Underwater Orienteering World Championships – International sporting competition
- Underwater Photography World Championships – International event for the sport of underwater photography
- Underwater Rugby World Championships – International sporting competition
