= Sub-Aqua Association =

British recreational diver training and certification organisation

- Abbreviation: SAA
- Formation: 1976
- Type: NGO
- Purpose: Diver training, services and advocacy.
- Headquarters: United Kingdom
- Location: Sefton Lane, Maghull, Liverpool, L31 8BX
- Region served: United Kingdom
- Affiliations: CMAS; CMAS Europe
- Website: www.saa.org.uk

The Sub-Aqua Association (SAA) is a diver training organization for scubadivers in the United Kingdom. The SAA and other UK-based diving groups have traditionally used a club-based system with unpaid instructors, while other training agencies organise most of their training programs through professional instructors and dive shops. The other major club-based diving organizations in the UK are the British Sub-Aqua Club (BSAC) and the Scottish Sub Aqua Club, and the principal non-club-based organisation is PADI.

== History ==
The Sub-Aqua Association was created in 1976 to represent diving clubs outside of the BSAC branch structure. Its training structure is based on the BSAC levels and offers a full range of diving qualifications. The association is made up of independent clubs, while the BSAC is a single club with many branches.

== Training ==
Sub-Aqua Association member clubs maintain their independence and individual clubs organize diving programs and instruction according to the national standards of the association. The association provides regional and national support for these activities. The SAA is one of two UK affiliates to World Underwater Federation (CMAS), the international umbrella organisation for diver training organizations, and has voting rights for both CMAS Technical and Scientific Committees. Application for CMAS cards (qualification or "C-cards") for divers in Great Britain is done via the SAA and its qualifications are accepted worldwide through the CMAS affiliation.

The association's training focuses on preparedness for the relatively cold and often visibility restricted waters around the UK. The SAA training also aims to be as comprehensive as possible, emphasizing rescue training very early in the programme. The association exercises regulation of its membership and has disqualified divers found guilty of breaches of its safety rules.

The SAA is a member of the British Diving Safety Group (BDSG), CMAS Europe. and the Joint Nautical Archaeology Policy Committee (JNAPC). It also collaborates with other external organisations, such as the Marine Conservation Society, Seasearch, and other environmental groups, the media, and examination boards to provide advice and expertise.

The SAA also acts as an advocate for amateur divers in the UK, representing their views to government agencies and similar bodies.

== Sources ==
- Sub-Aqua Association official web site
