= Fédération Française d'Études et de Sports Sous-Marins =

French diver training and certification agency

- Abbreviation: FFESSM
- Formation: 1948
- Type: NGO
- Purpose: Underwater sports and sciences and diver training
- Headquarters: 24 Quai de Rive-Neuve 13284 MARSEILLE cedex 07
- Region served: France
- President: Frédéric Di Meglio
- Affiliations: CMAS
- Staff: 6,000
- Volunteers: 140,000
- Website: https://www.ffessm.fr/
- Formerly called: FSPNES (1948-1952); FGRSSM (1952-1953); FFASM (1953-1954); FNESSM (1954-1955)

The Fédération Française d'Études et de Sports Sous-Marins (FFESSM) is a French sports federation specialized in recreational and competition underwater sports, like scuba diving and freediving. It is the main diver training organization in France.

The historical ancestor of the federation was created in 1948 under the name "Federation of societies for underwater fishing and swimming", and merged in 1955 with the "French federation of underwater activities" to become the current organization. It is one of the founding members of the Confédération Mondiale des Activités Subaquatiques (CMAS, World Confederation of Underwater Activities) created in 1959.

It has 140,000 members, 6,000 instructors, in 2,500 clubs. The federation has a delegation from the French Ministry of Sports to organize and develop scuba diving and related activities nationwide.

== Origins and history ==
In 1948, the organisation was created under the title, Fédération des sociétés de pêche à la nage et d'études sous-marines (FSPNES) (federation of societies for underwater fishing and swimming).

In 1952, FSPNES became the Fédération des groupements régionaux de sports sous-marins (FGRSSM) (federation of regional groupings of underwater sports).

In 1953, FGRSSM became the Fédération française des activités sous-marines (FFASM) (French federation of underwater activities).

In 1954, FFASM changed its name to the Fédération nationale française d'études et de sports sous-marins (FNFESSM) (French national federation of underwater studies and sports) in order to avoid confusion with FASM, a rival organisation with a similar name.

In 1955, FNFESSM and FASM merged to become FFESSM (French federation of underwater studies and sports).

== Underwater sport ==
FFESSM supports competition at all levels for the following underwater sports: finswimming, freediving, spearfishing, underwater hockey, cave diving, underwater orienteering and underwater target shooting. It also offers competition in canyoning.

== Qualifications ==
=== Diver level ===
- A level-1 diver can dive to a maximum depth of 20 m when under the direct supervision of at least a level-4 diver.
- A level-2 diver can dive to a maximum depth of 20 m with other level-2 (minimum) divers, and up to 40 m under the direct supervision of a level-4 diver.
- A level-3 diver can dive to a maximum depth of 60 m with other level-3 divers and of 20 m with other level-2 divers.
- A level-4 diver ("dive leader") can supervise level-1 and level-2 divers to a maximum depth of respectively 20 and 40 m (as described previously).
- A level-5 diver ("diving officer") chooses the diving sites, implements security measures, builds dive teams, and grants authorizations to divers and dive leaders for exploration dives.

=== Leadership level ===
- The level E1 Initiateur is a level II or III diver who also has a diplôme d'initiateur and the Rescue specialty (RIFAP), and can teach to a maximum depth of 6 m.
- The level E2 is a level IV diver who also has a diplôme d'initiateur and the Rescue specialty, or an E3 candidate, and can teach to a maximum depth of 20 m.
- The level E3 Moniteur fédéral 1er degré (MF1) or Moniteur fédéral 1er degré Associé (MF1A) or Brevet d'État d'éducateur sportif 1er degré (BEES1) can teach to a maximum depth of 40 m with air and 40 m with Trimix and is a diving officer for dives from 0–40 m with air/nitrox and 70 m with Trimix.
- The level E4 Moniteur fédéral 2e degré (MF2) or Moniteur fédéral 2e degré Associé (MF2A) or Brevet d'État d'éducateur sportif 2e degré (BEES2) can teach to a maximum depth of 60 m with air and 80 m with Trimix and is also a diving officer for diver deeper than 40m with air/nitrox and 120 m with Trimix.
- The level E5 Brevet d'État d'éducateur sportif 3e degré (BEES3) is an honorific level for research and teaching.

=== Equivalences ===
As the federation is a founding member of CMAS (world underwater federation), all certifications delivered to its divers come with a world equivalence.

== Presidents of the FFESSM ==
- Honorary president: Commandant Jacques-Yves Cousteau
- Founding president: Jean Flavien Borelli (1955–1956)
- Elie Ferat (1956–1965)
- Jacques Dumas (1965–1968 and 1972–1977)
- Henry Ducommun (1968–1972)
- Pierre Perraud (1977–1980)
- Bernard Dargaud (1980–1993)
- Francis Imbert (1993–2001)
- Roland Blanc (2001-2009)
- Jean-Louis Blanchard (2009-2021)
- Frédéric Di Meglio (Since march 2021)

== See also ==
- CMAS – International organisation for underwater activities (World underwater federation - Confédération mondiale des activités subaquatiques)
- Diver organisations – Membership organisations of underwater divers
