= Sports governing body =

Sports organization

A sports governing body is a sports organization that has a regulatory or sanctioning function.

Sports governing bodies come in various forms and have a variety of regulatory functions, including disciplinary procedure for rule infractions and deciding on rule changes in the sport that they govern. Governing bodies have different scopes. They may cover a range of sport at an internationally acceptable level, such as the International Olympic Committee and the International Paralympic Committee, or only a single sport at a national level, such as the Rugby Football League. National bodies will largely have to be affiliated with international bodies for the same sport. The first international federations were formed at the end of the 19th century.

== Types of sports governing bodies ==
51st Governing Body Meeting of the Sports Authority of India, in New Delhi

Every sport has a different governing body that can define the way that the sport operates through its affiliated clubs and societies. This is because sports have different levels of difficulty and skill, so they can try to organize the people playing their sport by ability and by age. There are several different types of sport governing bodies.

=== International sports federations ===
Vijay Goel addressing at the inauguration of the International Shooting Sports Federation World Cup 2017

International sports federations are non-governmental non-profit organizations for a given sport (or a group of similar sport disciplines, such as aquatics or skiing) and administers its sport at the highest level. These federations work to create a common set of rules, promote their sport, and organize international competitions. International sports federations represent their sport at the Olympic level where applicable.

About 30 international sport federations are located in Switzerland, with about 20 or so in the Lausanne area, where the International Olympic Committee is located.

International federations for sports that do not participate in the Olympic Games are managed by equivalent organizations to the International Olympic Committee, such as the SportAccord.

International federations are typically organized with legislative and executive branches at the top. The legislative body is usually referred to as a congress or general assembly of the international federation and is responsible for defining its sports policies. It consists of all of the national federations, each of which receives one vote. On the other hand, the executive branch, which is often referred to as the council or executive committee, consists of elected members by the legislative branch and is responsible for directing, managing, and representing their federation.

=== Trusts ===
Trusts are organizations or groups that have control over money used to help others, such as the Youth Sport Trust.

=== National governing bodies ===
National governing bodies have the same objectives as those of an international federation, but within the scope of one country, or even part of a country, as the name implies. They support local clubs and are often responsible for national teams. National Olympic Committees and National Paralympic Committees are both a type of national federation, as they are responsible for a country's participation in the Olympic Games and in the Paralympic Games respectively. A national governing body (NGB) however can be different from a national federation due to government recognition requirements. Also, national governing bodies can be a supraorganization representing a range of unrelated organizations operating in a particular sport, as evident in the example of the Northern Ireland Federation of Sub-Aqua Clubs.

=== Event organizers ===
Multi-sport event organizers are responsible for the organization of an event that includes more than one sport. The best-known example is the International Olympic Committee (IOC), the organizer of the modern Olympic Games. General sports organizations are responsible for sports-related topics, usually for a certain group, such as the Catholic or Jewish sports groups. General sports organizations and multi-sport events also exist for other groups such as the Invictus Games for military veterans.

=== Professional leagues ===
Professional sports leagues are usually the highest level of play in sport, specifically if they consist of the best players around the world in a certain sport. Because of this, they usually work with national or international federations, but there is usually a separation between the different federations. Most North American professional leagues usually do not have amateur divisions, as the amateur divisions are mostly run in separate leagues. Also, most professional leagues are related to other leagues, as players usually attempt to play in the league with the highest level of play. Because of this, promotion and relegation can occur; or, in league systems without promotion and relegation, clubs in professional leagues can have a team in the minor leagues. This enables them to shuffle players who are not doing well to the minor leagues, which will inspire them to contribute more to the team by playing better.

== Criticisms ==
A 2014 study by the Institute for Human Rights and Business (IHRB) criticized major international sports governing bodies including the International Olympic Committee and FIFA for not having sufficient provisions for human and labor rights.

== See also ==
- Regulation of sport
- List of international sports federations
