= World Games (disambiguation) =

The World Games are an international multi-sport event for sports that are not contested in the Olympic Games. World Games may also refer to:

- 2007 CMAS World Games, the first and only edition of the world games for underwater sports governed by the Confédération Mondiale des Activités Subaquatiques
- Women's World Games, athletics international women's Games organized from 1922 to 1934
- World Games (video game), multi-sport simulation game
- World Games metro station, Kaohsiung, Taiwan
- World Games Stadium, Kaohsiung, Taiwan
- Military World Games, multi-sport event for military personnel
- Special Olympics World Games, international sporting competition for athletes with intellectual disabilities
- World Games for the Deaf, former name for the Deaflympics

== Similar spelling ==
- word game
