= 2007 CMAS World Games =

- Host city: Bari, Apulia
- Country: Italy
- Events: 5 sports
- Opening: 31 July 2007
- Closing: 4 August 2007

The 2007 CMAS World Games was the first and only edition of the CMAS World Games, an Olympic style tournament for underwater sports organised by the Confédération Mondiale des Activités Subaquatiques (CMAS) and hosted in Bari, Italy.

CMAS created the event in attempt to boost popularity of underwater sports by combining the world championships of the sports under its purview into one event. However the concept ultimately failed due to discontent from the individual sports bodies as a result of being forced out of their pre-established competition calendars, which affected some sports more than others, and ultimately resulted in the 2007 event being the only one ever organised and played.

== Opposition ==
=== Underwater hockey ===
The World Underwater Hockey Commission, a group under the CMAS Sports Committee, opposed the World Games on grounds that their advice was being "consistently ignored" and that they were "ignoring our sport" and "[attacking] the democraticly elected commission".

On 2 January 2007, the British Octopush Association (BOA) pledged full support to the commission opposing CMAS in the process, joining the opposition from the underwater hockey bodies from Australia, Canada, New Zealand, South Africa, and the United States.

On 19 January, following further meetings, while still overall opposed to games, the BOA release a statement saying they saw the games as "an exciting opportunity for underwater sport". They also announced while they wouldn't send an official team to the games, they wouldn't not oppose their athletes attending. Australia, New Zealand, South Africa, and the United States did not send athletes to the games, while Canada and The Netherlands (like Great Britain) did not officially participate.

== Events ==
The games included events in the following sports:

- Finswimming (14th world championships)
- Freediving (14th world championships)
- Underwater hockey (15th world championships)
- Underwater orienteering (13th world championships)
- Underwater rugby (8th world championships)

== Venues ==
Numerous swimming pools in Bari would host the short course finswimming, underwater hockey, and underwater rugby events, while long course finswimming and underwater orienteering would be held in the Bari harbour basin. The Riserva naturale statale Torre Guaceto was earmarked to host the underwater photography event, however this ended up not being part of the World Games with a separate event taking place in Port Louis, Mauritius.

== Results ==
=== Finswimming ===
The finswimming tournament contained 36 different events:

- Events are mono-fin unless otherwise stated.
- In Apnoea events participants must complete the race in one breath.
- In Immersion events participants compete without snorkels thus must surface for air.
- In Surface events participants complete with snorkels thus can breathe throughout the race.

Event		Men			Women		
Event		Gold	Silver	Bronze	Gold	Silver	Bronze
50m	Apnoea	(Ukraine) Igor Soroka	(Russia) Evgeniu Skorzhenho	(Estonia) Nikolai Tover	(China) Boa Zhen Zhu	(China) Huan Shan Xu	(Estonia) Galija Sattarova
50m	Surface	(Russia) Evgeniu Skorzhenho	(Ukraine) Dmytro Sydorenko	(Italy) Cesare Fumarola	(China) Boa Zhen Zhu	(China) Huan Shan Xu	(Ukraine) Margo Artushenko
50m	bi-fin	(Russia) Pavel Kulakov	(Italy) Andrea Rampazzo	(Egypt) Eslam Ahmed Shama	(Russia) Valentine Artemieva	(Russia) Marina Maksimova	(Italy) Nicole Fiscarelli
100m	Immersion	(Ukraine) Igor Soroka	(Russia) Andrey Burakov	(Italy) Cesare Fumarola	(China) Boa Zhen Zhu	(China) Jing Li	(France) Camile Heitz
100m	Surface	(Italy) Cesare Fumarola	(Russia) Andrey Burakov	(Italy) Andrea Nava	(China) Boa Zhen Zhu	(China) Huan Shan Xu	(Ukraine) Margo Artushenko
100m	bi-fin	(Russia) Pavel Kulakov	(Italy) Andrea Rampazzo	(Russia) Vladimir Sokolov	(Russia) Valentine Artemieva	(Hungary) Csillia Károlyi	(Russia) Marina Maksimova
200m	Surface	(Italy) Stefano Figini	(Italy) Andrea Nava	(France) Benoit Castera	(China) Jing Li	(Russia) Vasilisa Kravchuk	(China) Boa Zhen Zhu
200m	bi-fin	(Italy) Andrea Rampazzo	(Hungary) Daniel Kokai	(Italy) Stefano Zerbini	(Hungary) Hajnalka Debreceni	(Hungary) Lilla Lengyel	(Russia) Marina Maksimova
400m	Immersion	(Greece) Ioannis Tsourounakis	(Russia) Igor Saprykine	(Hungary) Szilard Vilhelm	(China) Jiefen Huang	(South Korea) Ye Sol Jang	(Ukraine) Irina Polojshentzeva
400m	Surface	(Italy) Stefano Figini	(Italy) Andrea Nava	(Russia) Pavel Tcelischev	(China) Jiao Liu	(Russia) Vasilisa Kravchuk	(Ukraine) Olga Shlyakhovska
800m	Immersion	(Greece) Ioannis Tsourounakis	(Hungary) Szilard Vilhelm	(Russia) Igor Saprykine	(China) Jiefen Huang	(South Korea) Ye Sol Jang	(Ukraine) Irina Polojshentzeva
800m	Surface	(Italy) Stefano Figini	(Greece) Ionnis Tsourounakis	(South Korea) Young Ju Yun	(China) Jiao Liu	(China) Xin Yu	(Hungary) Melinda Wirtz
1,500m	Surface	(Italy) Stefano Figini	(South Korea) Young Joon Yun	(Italy) Fabio Picchi	(China) Jiao Liu	(China) Xin Yu	(Hungary) Melinda Wirtz
6,000m	Surface	(France) Raphaël Smolin Froissart	(Ukraine) Maksym Chornyi	(Russia) Aleksey Vouslovskikh	(France) Marine Grosjean	(Russia) Tatiana Tzoy	(Ukraine) Tatiyana Krasnogor
20,000m	Surface	(Russia) Pavel Babkin	(Russia) Dmitriy Kokorev	(Germany) Enrico Schultz	(Russia) Anna Andrievskikh	(France) Emilie Thienot	(Russia) Lyudmila Chukhnova
4×100m	Relay	Russia	Italy	Colombia	China	Ukraine	Russia
4×200m	Relay	Italy	Russia	Ukraine	China	Russia	Hungary
4×3,000m	Relay	Russia	Italy	Germany	Russia	Ukraine	France

=== Freediving ===
No sources available

=== Underwater hockey ===
Participants:

- Men's:
  - Belgium
  - France
  - Italy
  - Slovenia
  - Spain
  - Turkey
- Women's:
  - Belgium
  - France
  - Spain
  - Turkey

Men			Women		
Gold	Silver	Bronze	Gold	Silver	Bronze
France	Turkey		France	Turkey	

=== Underwater orienteering ===
No sources available

=== Underwater rugby ===
Participants:

- Men's:
  - Austria
  - Colombia
  - (Czech Republic) Czechia
  - Denmark
  - Finland
  - Germany
  - Italy-Switzerland
  - Norway
  - Russia
  - Spain
  - Sweden
  - Turkey
- Women's:
  - Colombia
  - Denmark
  - Finland
  - Germany
  - Italy
  - Norway
  - Russia
  - Spain
  - Sweden

Men			Women		
Gold	Silver	Bronze	Gold	Silver	Bronze
Finland	Sweden	Norway	Germany	Sweden	Norway

== Aftermath ==
=== Finswimming ===
Finswimming was temporarily moved off it two year competition cycle to accommodate the world games. No championships were cancelled though a number of continental championships were postponed to 2008 or held in quick succession with the world games before the competition calendar could be re-established. Subsequent world championships took place on odd years instead of even years.

=== Underwater hockey ===
An alternative world championships was held by the World Aquachallenge Association (WAA) in 2008 (in following with the sports two year competition cycle) following the schism created between national bodies who were for and against the world games, thought this was the only WAA championship to occur with CMAS re-establishing control of the international game in 2009. The 2009 championship was greatly reduced in comparison to pre-schism tournaments with only men's and women's elite tournaments occurring. Strangely, the 2009 edition was called the "Underwater Hockey World Game". A full world championships, with masters and youth tournaments, did not occur until 2013.

In 2008, the year of the WAA World Championship, CMAS held their European Championship tournament, which under the normal two year competition cycle would have been in 2007. The next edition took place as planned in 2010, but with World Championships still being rebuilt, the next European Championships did not occur until 2017. A tournament was planned for 2015 but did not take place.

=== Underwater rugby ===
Operating on a four-year competition calendar, with the last word championships in 2003, underwater rugby was not affected.
