= UWR =

UWR may refer to:

- Underwater rugby, an underwater sport invented in Germany during the 1960s
- United Western Recorders, a recording studio complex in Hollywood, California
- University of Wrocław, a public, research university in Wrocław, Poland
- Upper West Region, a region in Ghana
