= Underwater Orienteering World Championships =

International sporting competition

The Underwater Orienteering World Championships is the peak international event for the underwater sport of underwater orienteering. The event is conducted on behalf of the Confédération Mondiale des Activités Subaquatiques (CMAS) by an affiliated national federation. The championships was first held in 1973. Currently, it is held every 2 years on years ending with an odd number.

== History ==
Year	Date	Championship	Location event	# Teams	# Events
1973	September 12 – 17	1st World Championship	(Socialist Federal Republic of Yugoslavia) Lokve, Yugoslavia	15	
1985	August 3 – 8	2nd World Championships	(East Germany) Neuglobsow, DDR	15	
1987	August 4 – 10	3rd World Championships	(Soviet Union) Leningrad, USSR	15	
1989	September 10 – 19	4th World Championships	(Socialist Federal Republic of Yugoslavia) Fuzine, Yugoslavia	16	
1992	September 20 – 26	5th World Championships	Maltchacher Austria	18	
1994	September 3 – 10	6th World Championships	Lake Czarlina, Poland	14	
1996	August 10 – 14	7th World Championships	Pühajärve, Estonia	11	
1998	September 1 – 5	8th World Championships	Lake Rukkel Hungary	13	
1998	September 19 – 25	9th World Championships	Lake Tribalj, Croatia	15	
		10th World Championships			
		11th World Championships			
		12th World Championships			
2007		13th World Championships			
2009	August 26 – September 2	14th World Championships	Gyekenyes, Hungary,		
2011	September 10 – 17	15th World Championships	Lake Stoeritzsee, Berlin, Germany	12	
2013	August 5 – 8	16th World Championships	Kazan, Russia	12	

== Future championships ==
As of April 2013, the details of the next World Championships had not been announced.
