= Underwater orienteering =

Underwater compass navigation and speed competition on scuba.

Underwater Orienteering
- Highest governing body: CMAS
- Nicknames: Orienteering
- First played: 1950s

Characteristics
- Contact: no
- Team members: yes
- Mixed-sex: yes
- Type: Aquatic
- Equipment: diving mask, fins, open circuit scuba set, Compass, distance meter, safety buoy
- Venue: sheltered and open water

Underwater orienteering, also known as scuba orienteering, is an underwater sport that uses recreational open circuit scuba diving equipment and consists of a set of individual and team events conducted in both sheltered and open water testing the competitors' competency in underwater navigation. The competition is principally concerned with the effectiveness of navigation technique used by competitors to swim an underwater course following a route marked on a map prepared by the competition organisers, a compass and a counter meter to measure the distance covered. The sport was developed in the Soviet Union during the late 1950s and is played mainly in Europe. It is known as Orientation Sub in French and as La Orientación Subacuática in Spanish. Historically, the sport has also been known as Technical Disciplines.

== Equipment ==
Each competitor has the following recreational diving equipment: a diving mask, fins, a diving weighting system, an open circuit scuba set including diving cylinder filled with only breathing air of atmospheric origin and the following instruments: underwater compass and distance counting meter. Each competitor also must tow a buoy to identify his/her position underwater at all times when in the water. Competitors in the Monk Competition (refer below) are permitted to use one buoy between a pair of competitors provided a buddy line is used (i.e. wrist to wrist). An exposure suit (i.e. wetsuit with hood) is required where the water temperature is less than 14 °C (57 °F).

Competitors are not permitted to use underwater search techniques and aids (such as rope assisted searches or sonar) or to use underwater communication devices.

The equipment used in this sport has evolved since the sport's creation in order to improve competitor performance. Firstly, all of the scuba equipment and instruments are usually mounted together in a housing to create a streamlined form that can be held in front of the competitor to reduce resistance whilst swimming underwater and with a bracket to locate the instruments in front of the competitor allowing use whilst swimming and navigating the event courses. Secondly, competitors use monofins in order to move faster underwater.

Competitors are permitted to use survey equipment such as a theodolite or a total station to check maps issued by the competition organisers with exception to the maps for the Monk Competition (refer below). Competitors are not permitted to check distances and directions by swimming or operating a boat on the course.

== Competition area ==
The competition is usually held in natural water bodies such as freshwater lakes. Site selection criteria include a maximum current of 4 metres (13 ft)/minute, water depth no less than 3 metres (9.8 ft), underwater visibility to be at least 1 metre (3 ft 3 in) (measured with a secchi disk) and water quality is to be in accordance with World Health Organization requirements for bathing water. Competition sites are not permitted to be located in shipping lanes and areas intended for boating and swimming activity. When in use for competition, the site is marked by buoys anchored 50 m (160 ft) from the course.

== Events ==
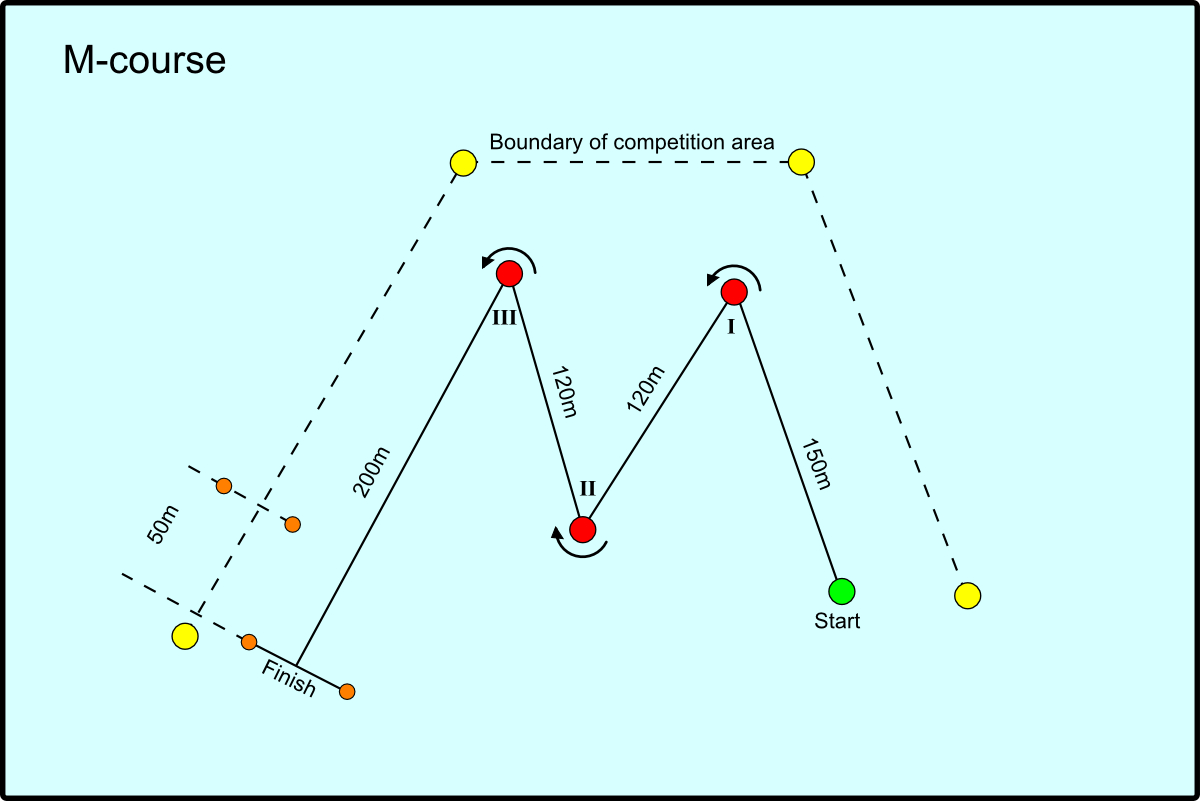
M-course

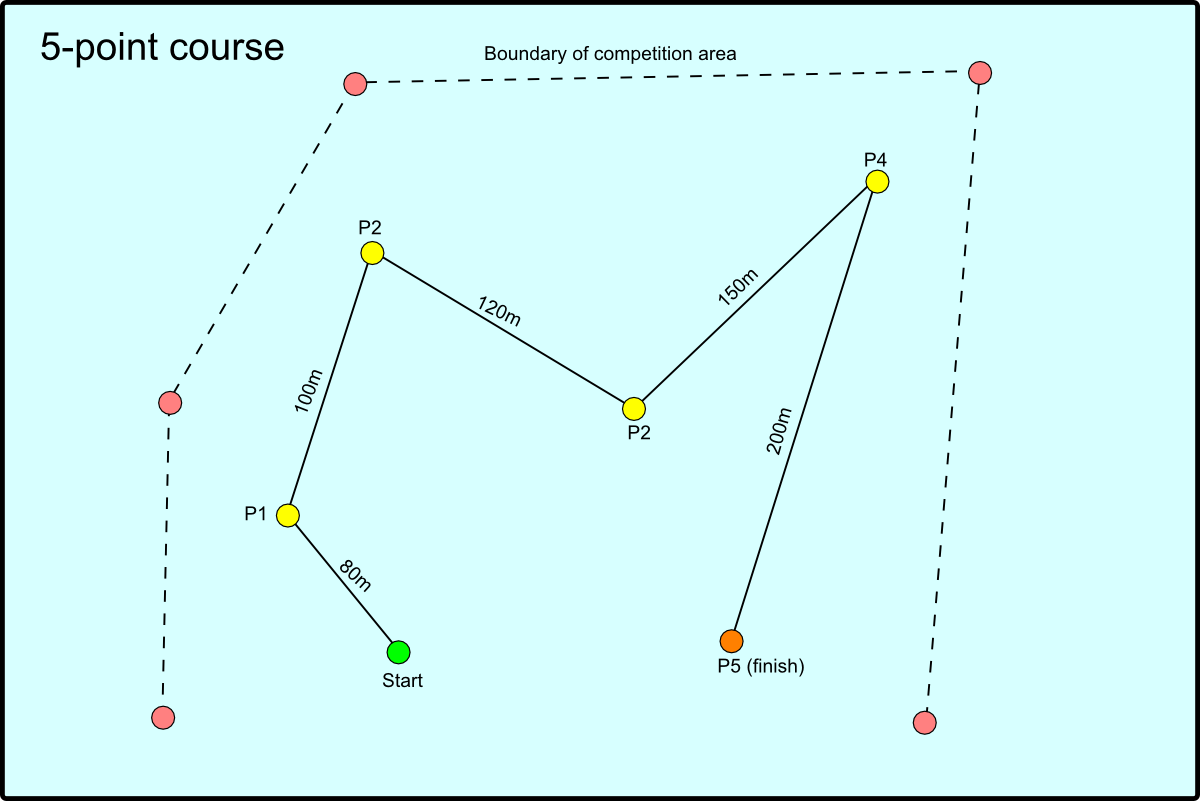
5-point course

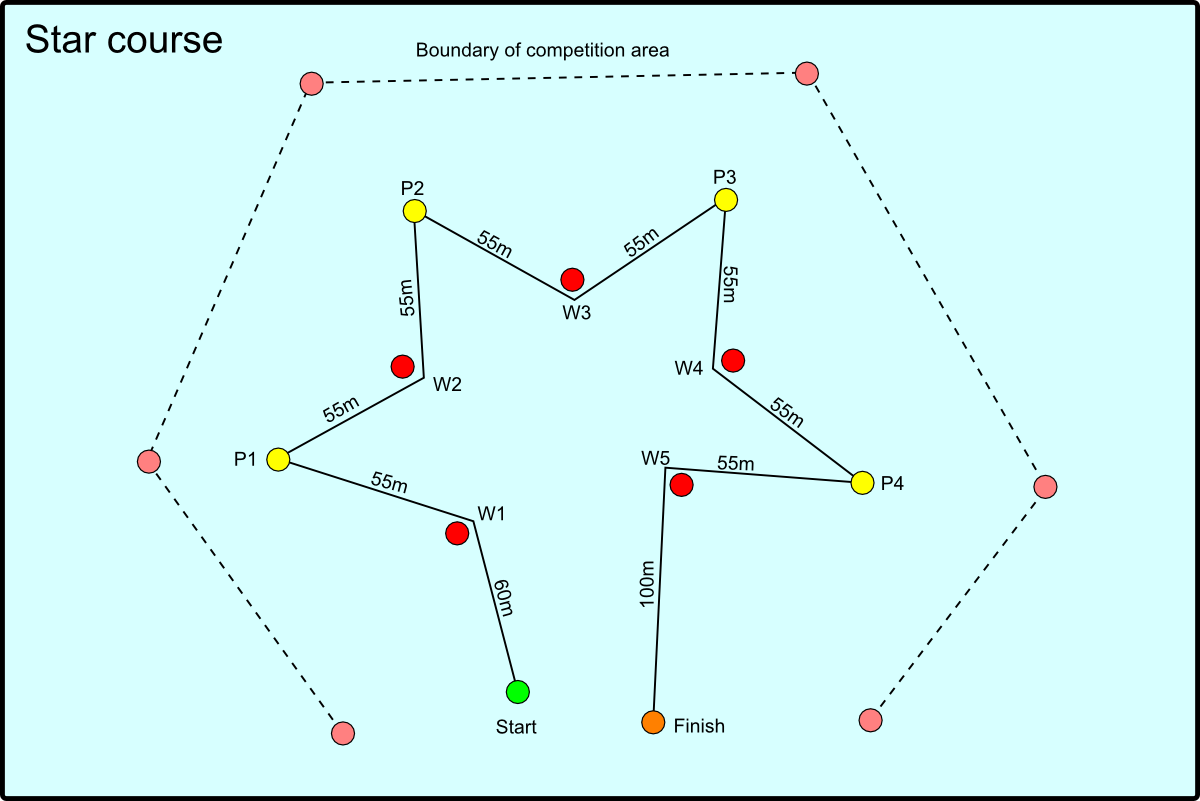
Star course

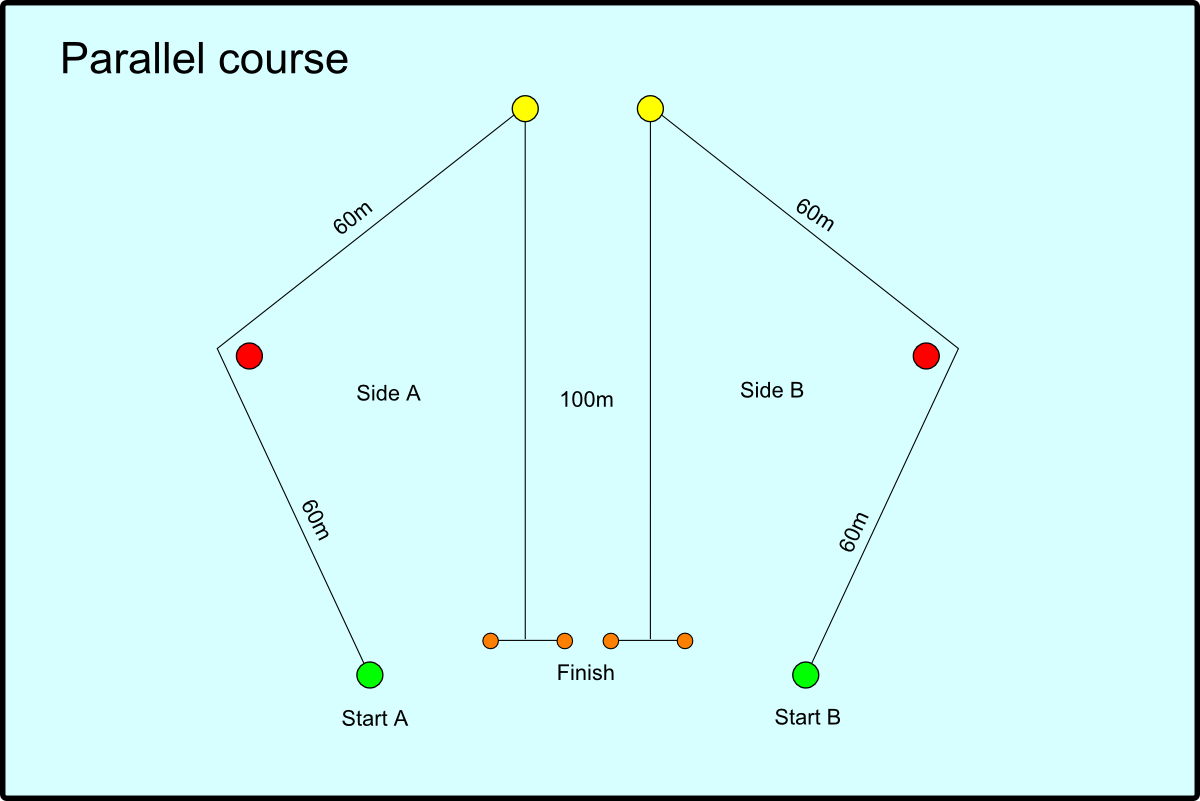
Parallel course

Four individual events and three team events are described in the International Rules.

=== Individual events ===
The M-Course is an M-shaped course of a total length of 590 metres (1,940 ft) consisting of a starting buoy, three rounding buoys and a finish line. Competitors are required to swim underwater around the rounding buoys in sequence and cross the finish line within the time limit of 15 minutes 20 seconds. Competitors are ranked using a point scoring system for correctly rounding the three buoys and for course accuracy at the finish line.

The 5-Point Course is a course of a total length of 650 metres (2,130 ft) consisting of a starting buoy and five orienteering points of which the last is the finish, all laid out in an irregular shape. Competitors are required to swim underwater around the course in sequence and to confirm the discovery of each orienteering point 'by clearly pulling or spinning it'. Competitors are ranked using a point scoring system for each orienteering point found and for the speed of the swim around the course.

The Star competition is a star-shaped course of a total length of 600 metres (2,000 ft) consisting of a starting buoy, five rounding buoys and five orienteering buoys of which the last is the finish. Competitors are required to swim underwater around the course in sequence and to confirm the discovery of each orienteering point 'by clearly pulling or spinning it'. Competitors are ranked using a point scoring system for correctly rounding the five buoys, for each orienteering point found and for the speed of the swim around the course.

The Parallel Race is a single-elimination tournament where pairs of divers from a pool of competitors usually numbered at 32 race against each other over five rounds until one competitor is left un-eliminated and therefore is the winner. The course consists of a pair of two triangular-shaped courses (known as Course A and Course B) of equal overall length and located next to each other. Each course has a total length of 220 metres (720 ft) and consists of one start buoy, one rounding buoy, one orientation buoy and a finish line of three to four metres width.

=== Team events ===
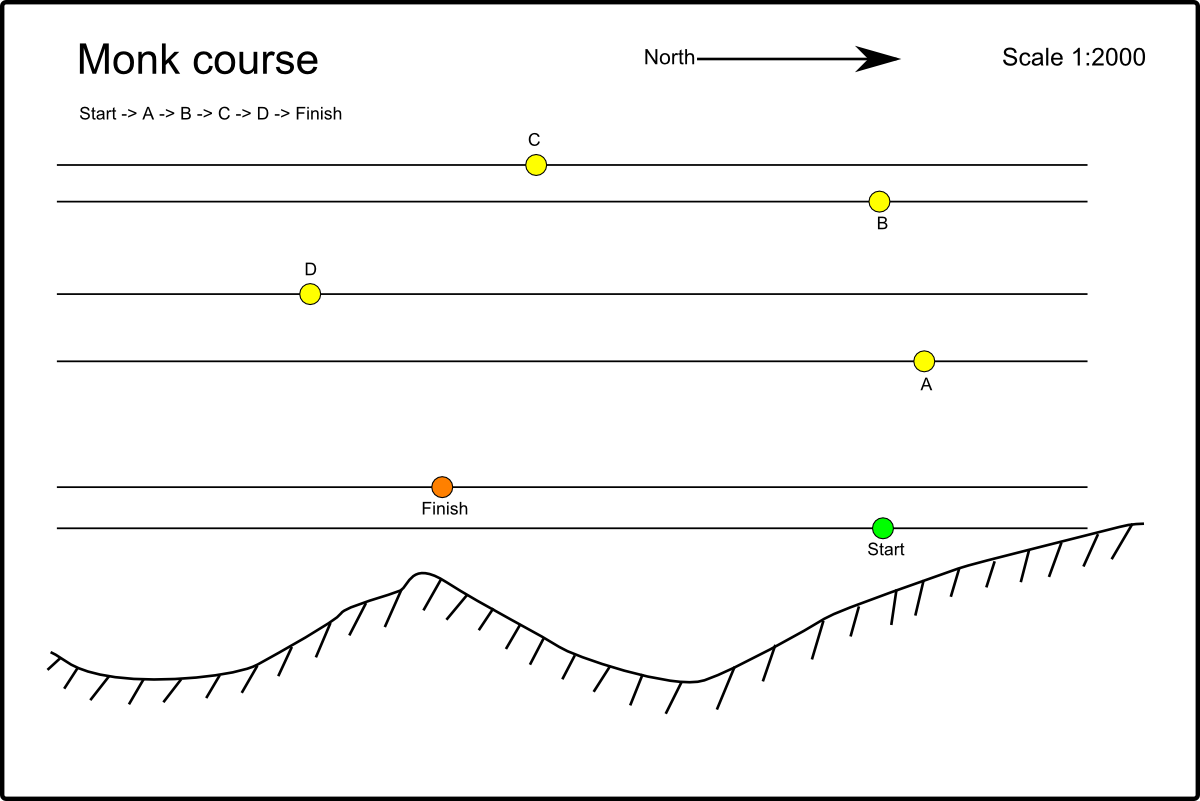
Monk course

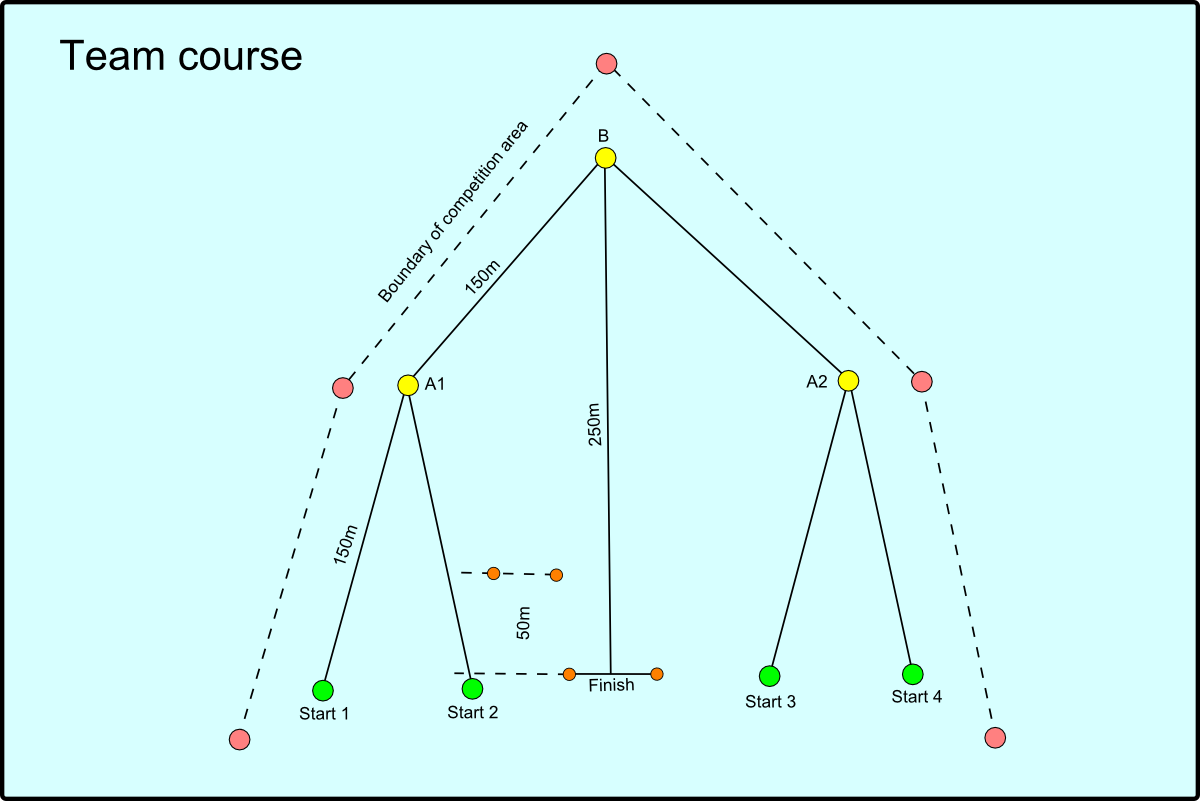
Team course option A

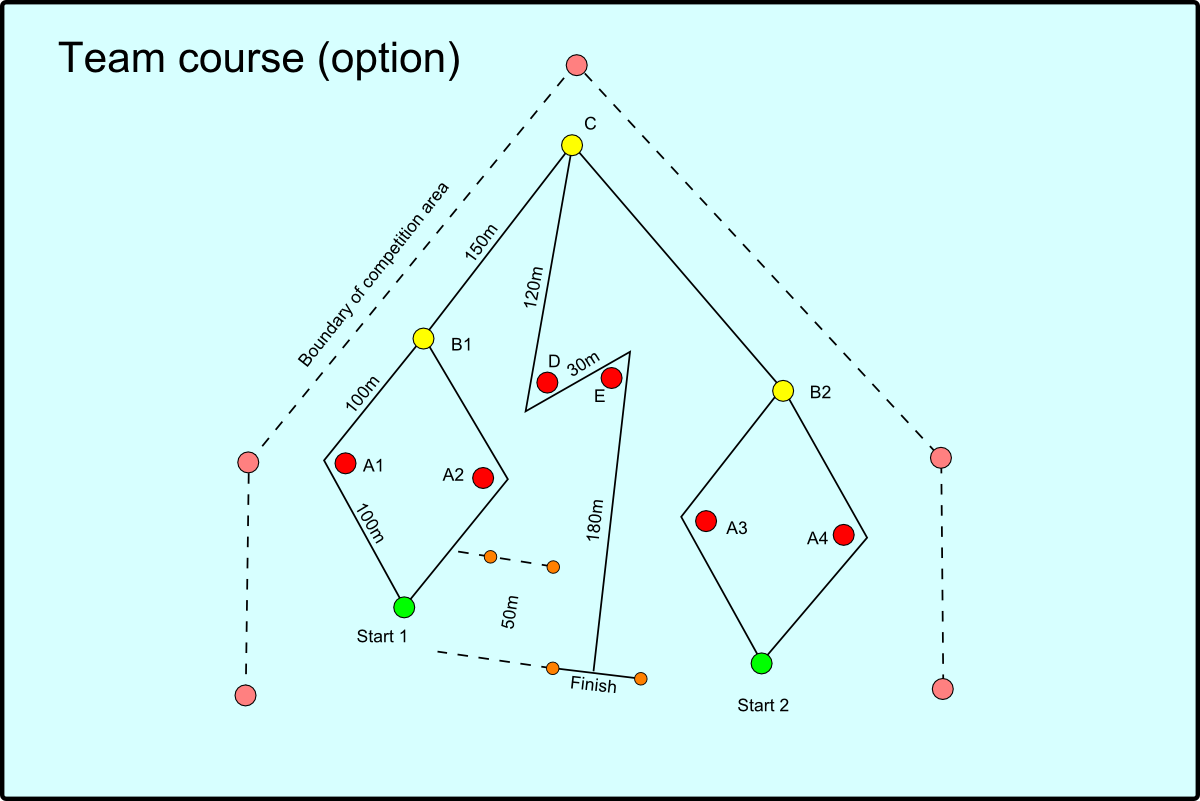
Team course option B

The Monk Competition is an event where a team of two competitors is required whilst underwater to plan and then navigate from the start to the finish of the course via a number of orienteering points (also called control points) shown on a waterproof map provided at the start of the event within a maximum time of 18 minutes. The map contains details of the shore lines, boundary of the competition area, and the exact position of start, finish and the control points to be located. The course consists of one starting buoy and at least five control points of which the last to be located is the finish point. All of the control points with exception to the finish point are not visible above the water's surface. The overall length is 650 metres (2,130 ft) with control points spaced at 100 to 150 metres (330 to 490 ft) apart. The teams are ranked using a point scoring system for the number of control points located and for the speed of the swim around the course.

'The Team event is an event where a team of three or four competitors start alone and progressively meet each other during the underwater swim within specified time limits and finish the course as a group within 15 minutes 20 seconds. Two variants of the event can be used subject to the water conditions at the competition site: Version A where the visibility is less than 2 to 3 metres (6 ft 7 in to 9 ft 10 in) and Version B where the visibility is greater than 2 to 3 metres (6 ft 7 in to 9 ft 10 in). Competitors are ranked individually using a point scoring system for the number of orienteering points reached and for the speed and precision of the swim at the finish around the course, multiplied by a factor determined by the number of competitors completing the course.

The Relay orienteering event is a relay race offered in the International Rules as an optional event for CMAS and national championships.

== Competitor admission requirements ==
Competitions organised under the auspices of Confédération Mondiale des Activités Subaquatiques (CMAS) are open to both men and women in separate competition categories as well as mixed gender teams. Competitors are divided by age where adults are older than 21 years and youths are between the ages of 15 and 21 years. Each competitor is required to be a member of a national diving federation affiliated to CMAS, have a CMAS Sports license valid for the year of competition, and be able to provide evidence of their nationality, their medical fitness to use scuba and their qualification to scuba dive.

== Governing body ==
The governing body is the Orienteering Commission of the CMAS Sport Committee. As of May 2013, the following countries and territories have affiliated with the Commission - Austria, Belgium, Bosnia-Herzegovina, Croatia, Cyprus, Czech Republic, Egypt, Estonia, France, Germany, Hong Kong, Hungary, Italy, Japan, Kazakhstan, Montenegro, Russia, Serbia, Slovenia, South Africa, Spain and Ukraine.

== Origins and history ==
The creation of the sport is attributed to underwater divers in the USSR. The first international competition was held in Crimea during 1965 with participants attending from Austria, Bulgaria, Hungary, Italy and the USSR. Within Central Europe, the first competitions were held in Angera on Lake Maggiore in Italy during 1961 and at Wörthersee in Austria during 1962.

The program at the first European Championship in 1967 consisted of two underwater swimming races over distances of 40 and 1,000 metres (130 and 3,280 ft), an M-course and a team competition for three competitors involving two swims of 1,150 metres (3,770 ft) and the completion of an underwater task at the end of the first swim. The underwater swimming races were retained until 1969. The M Course was substantially revised in the proposed international rules tabled by the USSR at the CMAS General Assembly in 1969 with a change from precision to speed by the introduction of the points system. The 5 point course was introduced as an individual competition in 1968, followed by the Monk Competition during the 1970s and the Star competition in 1987.

The Orienteering Commission was established within the CMAS Sports Committee in January 1969 under the name of the Technical Discipline Commission (French: Commission Technique Subaquatique) with Valentin Stachevski of the USSR as its first president.

== Championships ==
Prior to 1967, all competition was held in Central Europe and Eastern Europe. Major championships have been conducted at continental level within Europe since 1967 and at world level since 1973. A regional event called the European Cup which was awarded for the best result in five regional competitions within Europe was introduced in the early 1970s. Regular attendance at the European Cup by competitors from South Africa resulted in its renaming as the World Cup in 1989.

== See also ==
- Şahika Ercümen – Turkish dietician and world record holding freediver
- Underwater Orienteering World Championships – International sporting competition
- 1986 South American Games – Multi-sport event in Santiago, Chile
