= Underwater Rugby World Championships =

International sporting competition

The Underwater Rugby World Championships is the peak international event for the underwater sport of underwater rugby. The event is conducted on behalf of the Confédération Mondiale des Activités Subaquatiques (CMAS) by an affiliated national federation. The championships was first held in 1980.

== Men Underwater Rugby World Championships ==
Year	Championship	Host city, Country	Gold	Silver	Bronze	4th	5th	6th	7th	8th	9th	10th	11th	12th	13th	14th	15th	16th	17th
1980	1st World Championships	Mülheim, Germany	1 (Denmark) DEN	2 (Germany) GER	3 (Sweden) SWE	(Finland) FIN	(Norway) NOR	(Austria) AUT	(Italy) ITA	—N/a									
1983	2nd World Championships	Malmö, Sweden	1 (Denmark) DEN	2 (Germany) GER	3 (Sweden) SWE	(Finland) FIN	(Austria) AUT	(Norway) NOR	—N/a										
1987	3rd World Championships	Zürich, Switzerland	1 (Sweden) SWE	2 (Denmark) DEN	3 (Germany) GER	(Finland) FIN	(Austria) AUT	(Norway) NOR	(Switzerland) SUI	—N/a									
1991	4th World Championships	Copenhagen, Denmark	1 (Sweden) SWE	2 (Norway) NOR	3 (Germany) GER	(Austria) AUT	(Denmark) DEN	(Finland) FIN	(Czech Republic) CZE	(Colombia) COL	(Switzerland) SUI	—N/a							
1995	5th World Championships	Cali, Colombia	1 (Sweden) SWE	2 (Denmark) DEN	3 (Norway) NOR	(Germany) GER	(Finland) FIN	(Austria) AUT	(Colombia) COL	(Czech Republic) CZE	(Switzerland) SUI	(Peru) PER	—N/a						
1999	6th World Championships	Essen, Germany	1 (Sweden) SWE	2 (Denmark) DEN	3 (Germany) GER	(Norway) NOR	(Colombia) COL	(Czech Republic) CZE	(Austria) AUT	(United States) USA	—N/a								
2003	7th World Championships	Fredericia, Denmark	1 (Sweden) SWE	2 (Norway) NOR	3 (Finland) FIN	(Germany) GER	(Denmark) DEN	(Colombia) COL	(Czech Republic) CZE	(Russia) RUS	(Switzerland) SUI	(United States) USA	(Turkey) TUR	—N/a					
2007	8th World Championships	Bari, Italy	1 (Finland) FIN	2 (Sweden) SWE	3 (Norway) NOR	(Denmark) DEN	(Germany) GER	(Colombia) COL	(Italy) ITA	(Switzerland) SUI	(Russia) RUS	(Czech Republic) CZE	(Austria) AUT	(Turkey) TUR	(Spain) SPA	—N/a			
2011	9th World Championships	Helsinki, Finland	1 (Norway) NOR	2 (Germany) GER	3 (Sweden) SWE	(Finland) FIN	(Denmark) DEN	(Colombia) COL	(Czech Republic) CZE	(Turkey) TUR	(Russia) RUS	(Austria) AUT	(Italy) ITA	—N/a					
2015	10th World Championships	Cali, Colombia	1 (Norway) NOR	2 (Germany) GER	3 (Colombia) COL	(Sweden) SWE	(Denmark) DEN	(Venezuela) VEN	(Austria) AUT	(Canada) CAN	(United States) USA	(Spain) SPA	(Australia) AUS	(South Africa) SAF	—N/a				
2019	11th World Championships	Graz, Austria	1 (Colombia) COL	2 (Norway) NOR	3 (Germany) GER	(Denmark) DEN	(Sweden) SWE	(Finland) FIN	(Austria) AUT	(Spain) SPA	(Australia) AUS	(Czech Republic) CZE	(United States) USA	(Italy) ITA	(Canada) CAN	(United Kingdom) GRB	(Hungary) HUN	(Slovakia) SVK	(Luxembourg) LUX
2023	12th World Championships	Montreal, Canada	1 (Colombia) COL	2 (Germany) GER	3 (Denmark) DEN	(Norway) NOR	(Sweden) SWE	(United States) USA	(Australia) AUS	(Austria) AUT	(Canada) CAN	(Spain) SPA	—N/a						
2027	13th World Championships	Torremolinos, Spain	1	2	3	—N/a													

=== Total Men Underwater Rugby World Championships ===
Position	Country	Gold	Silver	Bronze
1	(Sweden) SWE	5	1	3
2	(Norway) NOR	2	3	2
	(Denmark) DEN	2	3	1
	(Colombia) COL	2	0	1
5	(Finland) FIN	1	0	1

== Women Underwater Rugby World Championships ==
Year	Championship	Host city, Country	Gold	Silver	Bronze	4th	5th	6th	7th	8th	9th	10th	11th	12th	13th	14th
1991	4th World Championships	Copenhagen, Denmark	1 (Sweden) SWE	2 (Norway) NOR	3 (Germany) GER	(Finland) FIN	(Denmark) DEN	(Switzerland) SUI	—N/a							
1995	5th World Championships	Cali, Colombia	1 (Norway) NOR	2 (Germany) GER	3 (Sweden) SWE	(Finland) FIN	(Colombia) COL	(Denmark) DEN	(Peru) PER	—N/a						
1999	6th World Championships	Essen, Germany	1 (Sweden) SWE	2 (Norway) NOR	3 (Germany) GER	(Colombia) COL	(Denmark) DEN	—N/a								
2003	7th World Championships	Fredericia, Denmark	1 (Germany) GER	2 (Sweden) SWE	3 (Colombia) COL	(Norway) NOR	(Denmark) DEN	(United States) USA	(Turkey) TUR	—N/a						
2007	8th World Championships	Bari, Italy	1 (Germany) GER	2 (Sweden) SWE	3 (Norway) NOR	(Colombia) COL	(Denmark) DEN	(Russia) RUS	(Finland) FIN	(Italy) ITA	(Spain) SPA	—N/a				
2011	9th World Championships	Helsinki, Finland	1 (Norway) NOR	2 (Sweden) SWE	3 (Germany) GER	(Finland) FIN	(Colombia) COL	(Denmark) DEN	(Spain) SPA	—N/a						
2015	10th World Championships	Cali, Colombia	1 (Germany) GER	2 (Norway) NOR	3 (Colombia) COL	(Sweden) SWE	(Finland) FIN	(Denmark) DEN	(Australia) AUS	(Venezuela) VEN	(United States) USA	—N/a				
2019	11th World Championships	Graz, Austria	1 (Norway) NOR	2 (Germany) GER	3 (Colombia) COL	(Finland) FIN	(Sweden) SWE	(Austria) AUT	(Turkey) TUR	(Australia) AUS	(Denmark) DEN	(Spain) SPA	(United States) USA	(Italy) ITA	(Canada) CAN	(United Kingdom) GBR
2023	12th World Championships	Montreal, Canada	1 (Colombia) COL	2 (Norway) NOR	3 (Germany) GER	(Australia) AUS	(Sweden) SWE	(Denmark) DEN	(Austria) AUT	(United States) USA	(Spain) SPA	(Canada) CAN	—N/a			
2027	13th World Championships	Torremolinos, Spain	1	2	3	—N/a										

=== Total Women Underwater Rugby World Championships ===
Position	Country	Gold	Silver	Bronze
1st	(Norway) NOR	3	4	1
	(Germany) GER	3	2	4
3rd	(Sweden) SWE	2	3	1
4th	(Colombia) COL	1	0	3
