= Underwater sports =

Competitive underwater recreational activities

- Highest governing body: Organisations include: CMAS; AIDA International; World Aquachallenge Association (WAA)

Characteristics
- Mixed-sex: Yes
- Type: Outdoor: Openwater; Confined water; Indoor: Swimming pool

Presence
- Olympic: No demonstration events as of July 2013.

Underwater sports is a group of competitive sports using one or a combination of the following underwater diving techniques - breath-hold, snorkelling or scuba, usually including the use of equipment such as diving masks and fins. These sports are conducted in the natural environment at sites such as open water and sheltered or confined water such as lakes and in artificial aquatic environments such as swimming pools. Underwater sports include the following - aquathlon (i.e. underwater wrestling), finswimming, freediving, spearfishing, sport diving, underwater football, underwater hockey, underwater ice hockey, underwater orienteering, underwater photography, underwater rugby, underwater target shooting and underwater video.

== The sports ==
=== Aquathlon ===
Aquathlon (also known as underwater wrestling) is an underwater sport where two competitors wearing masks and fins wrestle underwater in an attempt to remove a ribbon from each other's ankle band in order to win the bout. The "combat" takes place in a 5-metre (16 ft) square ring within a swimming pool, and is made up of three 30-second rounds, with a fourth round played in the event of a tie. The sport originated during the 1980s in the former USSR (now Russia) and was first played at international level in 1993. It was recognised by Confédération Mondiale des Activités Subaquatiques (CMAS) in 2008.

=== Finswimming ===
Finswimming is an underwater sport consisting of four techniques involving swimming with the use of fins either on the water's surface using a snorkel using either monofins or bifins (i.e. one fin for each foot) or underwater with monofin either by holding one's breathe or underwater using open circuit scuba diving equipment. Events exist over distances similar to swimming competitions for both swimming pool and open water venues. Competition at world and continental level is organised by CMAS. The sport's first world championship was held in 1976. It also has been featured at the World Games as a trend sport since 1981 and was demonstrated at the 2013 Summer Universiade in July 2013.

=== Freediving ===
Competitive freediving is currently governed by two world associations: AIDA International (International Association for Development of Apnea) and CMAS. Most types of competitive freediving have in common that it is an individual sport based on the best individual achievement. An exception to this rule is the bi-annual World Championship for Teams, held by AIDA, where the combined score of the team members makes up the team's total points. There are currently nine disciplines used by official governing bodies and a dozen disciplines that are only practiced locally. In this article, the recognized disciplines of AIDA and CMAS will be described. All disciplines can be done by both men and women and, while done outdoors, no differences in the environment between records are recognized any longer. The disciplines of AIDA can be done both in competition and as a record attempt, with the exception of Variable Weight and No limits, which are both done solely as record attempts.

=== Skandalopetra ===
Skandalopetra diving is freediving using a stone weight at the end of a rope to the surface. It dates from ancient Greece, when it was used by sponge fishermen, and has been re-discovered in recent years as a competitive freediving discipline. It was in this discipline that the first world record in freediving was registered, when the Greek sponge fisherman Stathis Chantzis dived to a depth of 83 m (272 ft) in July 1913. It consists of a variable ballast dive using a skandalopetra tied to a rope to take the diver down. A companion on a boat recovers the diver by pulling the rope up after the descent, and keeps a watch on the diver from the surface.

=== Spearfishing ===
Spearfishing (also known as competition spearfishing) as an underwater sport involves the hunting and capture of fish underwater using breath-hold technique and a tackle system such as a speargun as part of a tournament of fixed duration involving other competitors.

=== Sport diving ===
Sport Diving is an underwater sport that uses recreational open circuit scuba diving equipment and consists of a set of individual and team events conducted in a swimming pool that test the competitors' competency in recreational scuba diving technique. The sport was developed in Spain during the late 1990s and is currently played mainly in Europe. It is known as Plongée Sportive in French and as Buceo De Competición in Spanish.

=== Underwater football ===
Underwater football is a two-team underwater sport that shares common elements with underwater hockey and underwater rugby. As with both of those games, it is played in a swimming pool with snorkelling equipment (mask, snorkel, and fins).

=== Underwater hockey ===
Underwater hockey (UWH; also called Octopush and Water Hockey locally) is a globally played limited-contact sport in which two teams compete to manoeuvre a puck across the bottom of a swimming pool into the opposing team's goal by propelling it with a stick. It originated in England in 1954 when the founder of the newly formed Southsea Sub-Aqua Club invented the game as a means of keeping the club's members interested and active over the cold winter months when open-water diving lost its appeal. Underwater hockey was first played as a world championship in Canada in 1980 after a false start brought about by international politics in 1979. CMAS is the world governing body for this sport.

=== Underwater ice hockey ===
Underwater ice hockey (also called sub-aqua ice hockey) is a minor extreme sport that is a variant of ice hockey. It is played upside-down underneath frozen pools or ponds. Participants wear diving masks, fins and wetsuits and use the underside of the frozen surface as the playing area for a floating puck. Competitors do not utilize any breathing apparatuses, but instead surface for air every 30 seconds.

=== Underwater orienteering ===
Underwater orienteering is an underwater sport that uses recreational open circuit scuba diving equipment and consists of a set of individual and team events conducted in both sheltered and open water that test the competitors' competency in underwater navigation. The competition is principally concerned with the effectiveness of navigation technique used by competitors to swim an underwater course following a route marked on a map prepared by the competition organisers, a compass and a counter meter to measure the distance covered. The sport was developed in the USSR during the late 1950s and is currently played mainly in Europe. It is known as Orientation Sub in French and as La Orientación Subacuática in Spanish. Historically, the sport has also been known as Technical Disciplines.

=== Underwater photography ===
Underwater photography is a scuba-based underwater sport governed by CMAS where teams of competitors using digital underwater camera systems all dive at the same saltwater ocean sites at the same time over a two-day period. The submitted digital images are then assessed and ranked by a jury using a maximum of five photographic categories as well as an overall score. The sport was developed prior to 1985 as a photographic film-based event and is currently mainly practised in non-English speaking countries.

=== Underwater rugby ===
Underwater rugby (UWR) is an underwater sport whose play involves two teams seeking to gain control of a slightly negatively buoyant ball (filled with saltwater) and passing it into a heavy metal bucket serving as the opponents' goal at the bottom of a swimming pool. It originated from within the physical fitness training regime existing in German diving clubs during the early 1960s and has little in common with rugby football except for the name. It was recognised by CMAS in 1978 and was first played as a world championship in 1980.

=== Underwater target shooting ===
Underwater target shooting is an underwater sport that tests a competitors' ability to accurately use a speargun via a set of individual and team events conducted in a swimming pool using free diving or Apnoea technique. The sport was developed in France during the early 1980s and is currently practised mainly in Europe. It is known as Tir sur cible subaquatique in French and as Tiro al Blanco Subacuático in Spanish.

=== Underwater video ===
Underwater video is a scuba-based underwater sport governed by CMAS where teams of competitors using digital underwater video systems all dive at the same saltwater ocean sites at the same time over a two-day period. The submitted digital video are then assessed and ranked by a jury.

== Governance ==
The majority of the sporting disciplines listed above are governed by CMAS. Other organisations involved in governance of underwater sports include AIDA International and the World Aquachallenge Association which also respectively govern Freediving and Underwater Hockey in competition with CMAS while the Manitoba Underwater Council governs Underwater Football. As of July 2013, it is not known who governs Underwater Ice Hockey.

== Competition at international level ==
=== Olympic Games ===
As of 2013, there has been no competition at an Olympic Games by any underwater sport, even as a demonstration, although the following breath-hold events have been conducted as part of the swimming competition - underwater swimming event at the 1900 Summer Olympics in Paris and a plunge for distance event at the 1904 Summer Olympics in St. Louis, Missouri. During the 1950s and the 1960s, various parties including the Amateur Athletic Union of the United States and the International Underwater Spearfishing Association lobbied for the admission of spearfishing to the Olympics. It is reported that in 1968, the International Olympic Committee (IOC) voted in favour of synchronized swimming over spearfishing. In 1999, finswimming was reported as being considered for inclusion in the 2004 Summer Olympics in Athens, Greece. In 2002, Underwater sports was one of the sports considered by the IOC for addition to the programme of the 2008 Summer Olympics in Beijing, China. It and eight other sports were declined admission on the basis of:

Statistics reviewed on federation affiliation, nations competing in major events and broadcast and press coverage of major events for most requested sports did not indicate a higher level of global participation and interest than sports currently in the Programme, and therefore could not be considered to bring additional value.

=== Paralympic Games ===
As August 2013, there has been no Paralympic competition by any underwater sport, even as a demonstration.

=== World championships and world cups ===
World championships and world cups
| Sport | Body | Year Established | Article |
|---|---|---|---|
| Aquathlon | CMAS | 2009 | |
| Finswimming | CMAS | 1976 | Finswimming World Championships |
| Freediving | AIDA | 1996 | |
| Spearfishing | CMAS | 1957 | |
| Sport Diving | CMAS | 2013 | |
| Underwater football | MUC | 2015 | |
| Underwater hockey | CMAS | 1980 | Underwater Hockey World Championships |
| Underwater Ice Hockey | Not known | 2007 | |
| Underwater orienteering | CMAS | 1973 | Underwater Orienteering World Championships |
| Underwater photography | CMAS | 1985 | Underwater Photography World Championships |
| Underwater rugby | CMAS | 1980 | Underwater Rugby World Championships |
| Underwater target shooting | CMAS | 1999 | |
| Underwater video | CMAS | 2010 | |

In 2007, CMAS organised the inaugural world games for underwater sports by combining the world championships of the sports it governed into one event. This ultimately failed, and the 2007 event was the only one ever organised and played.

=== World Games ===
Finswimming has been featured at the World Games as a trend sport since the inaugural games in 1981.

=== Commonwealth Games ===
As of August 2013, no underwater sport has been conducted at a Commonwealth Games or is currently listed as an optional sport. However, a group of countries belonging to the Commonwealth of Nations has conducted at least one finswimming championship under the title of the Commonwealth Finswimming Championships and which was held in Hobart, Tasmania, Australia during February 2007.

=== Universiade ===
Finswimming became the first underwater sport to be demonstrated at an Universiade with an appearance at the 27th Summer Universiade in July 2013.

=== Other multi-sport events ===
The following underwater sports has been offered at the following multi-sport events:

- Finswimming - the Asian Indoor Games since 2005, the Southeast Asian Games in 2009 and 2011, the Bolivarian Games in 2013 and the 2014 Bolivarian Beach Games.
- Freediving - 2013 Bolivarian Games and the 2014 Bolivarian Beach Games.
- Spearfishing - the Micronesian Games since 2006, the 2013 Bolivarian Games and the 2014 Bolivarian Beach Games.
- Underwater orienteering - the 1986 South American Games.

== Gallery ==
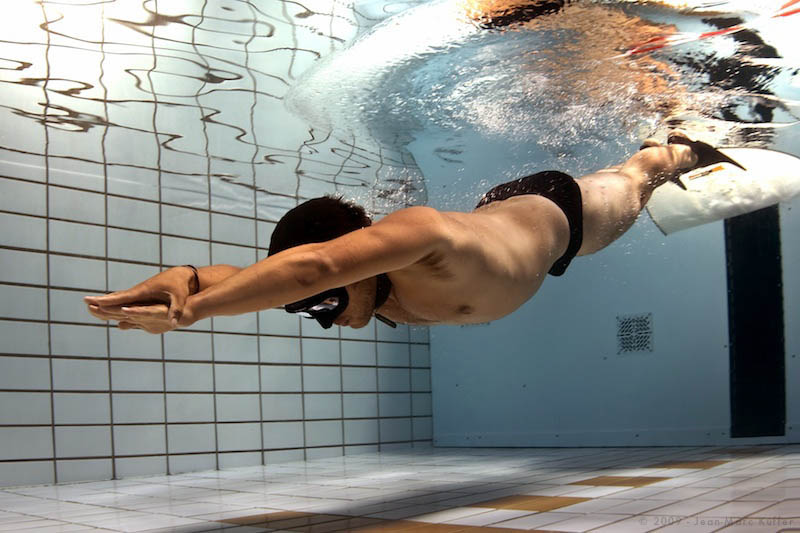
Freediver using monofin in pool competition in London, 2009.

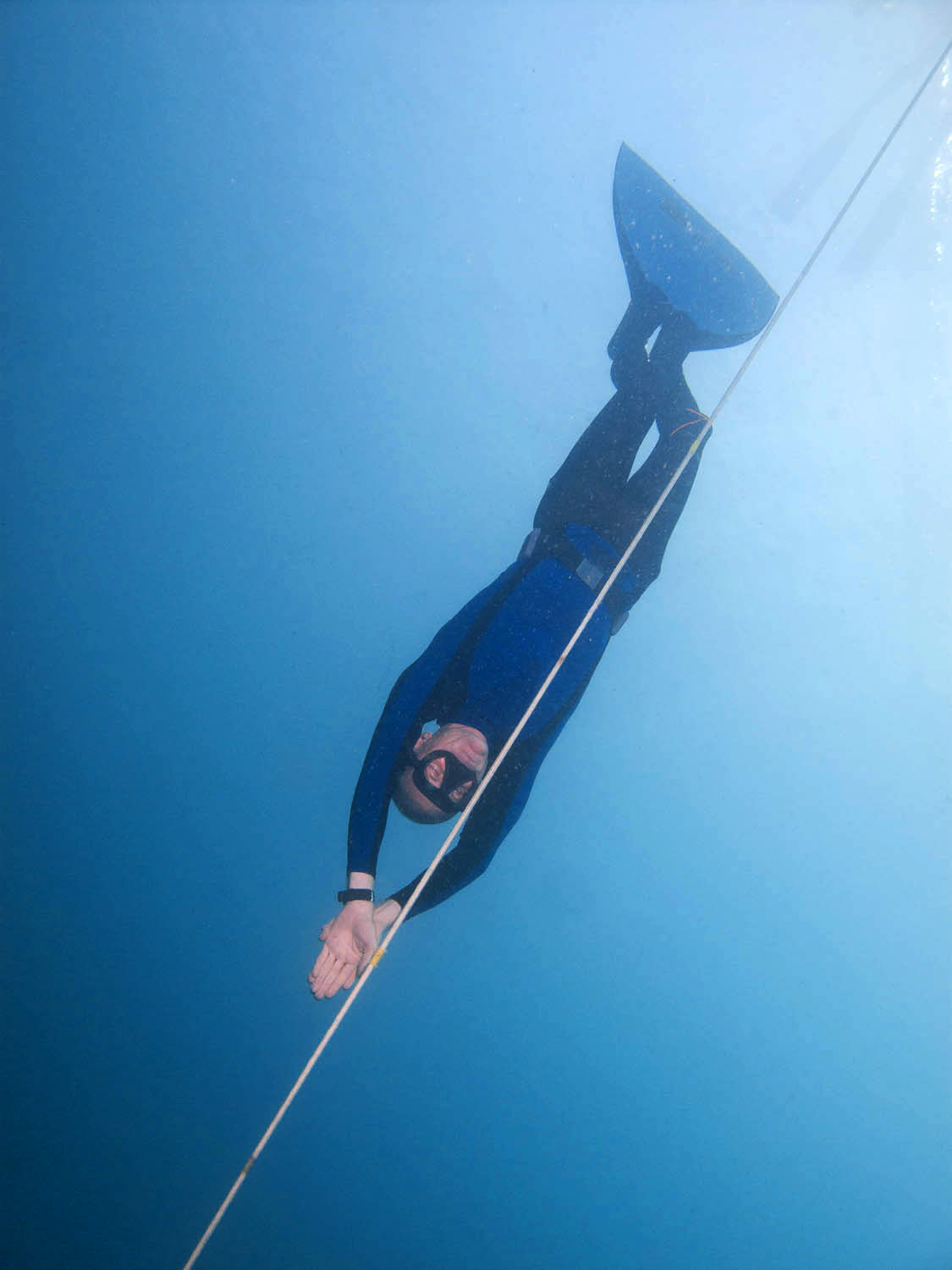
Freediver using monofin in depth competition (location & date not known).

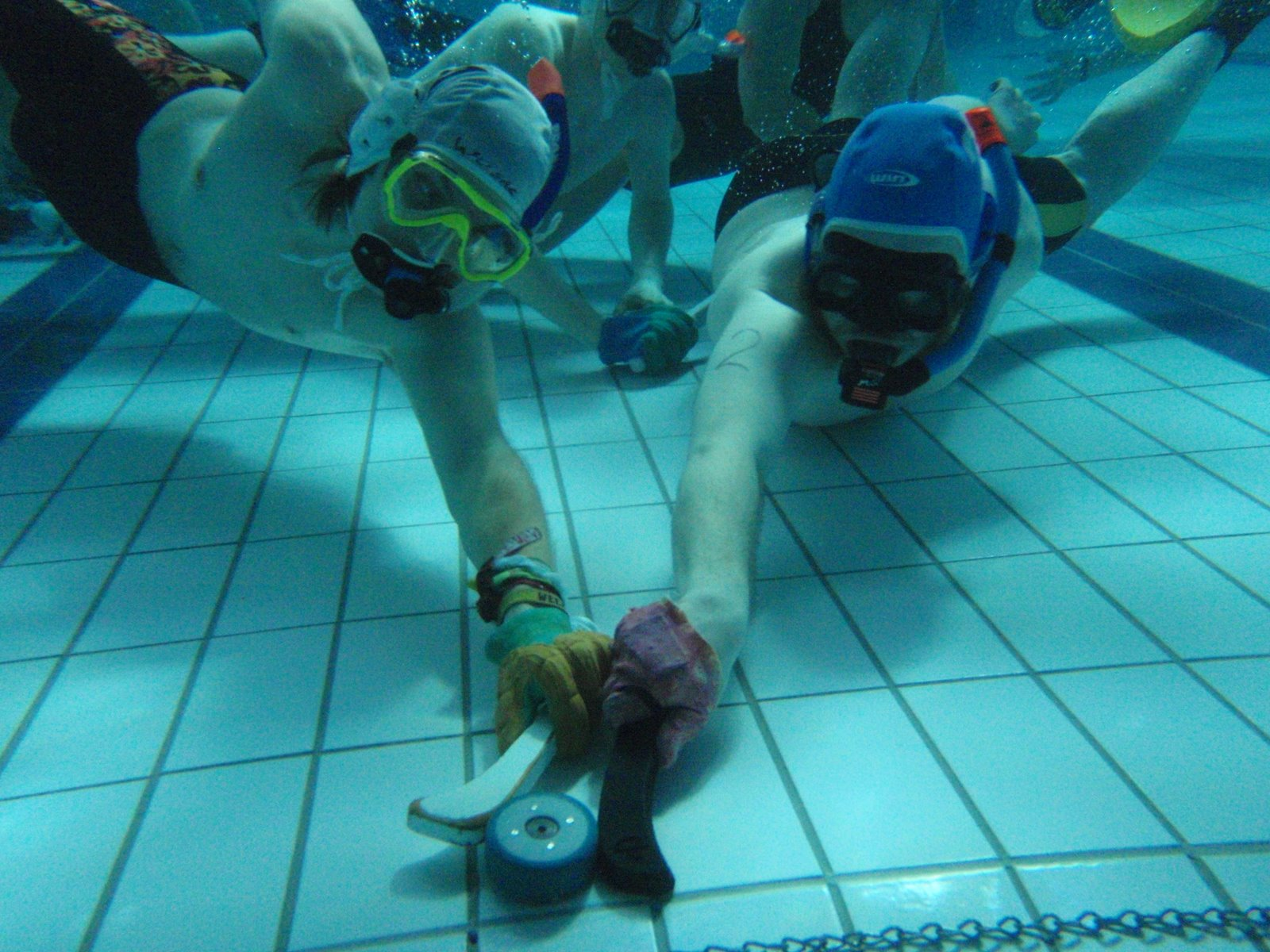
Two players compete for the puck at the British Student Nationals in Bangor, 2009.

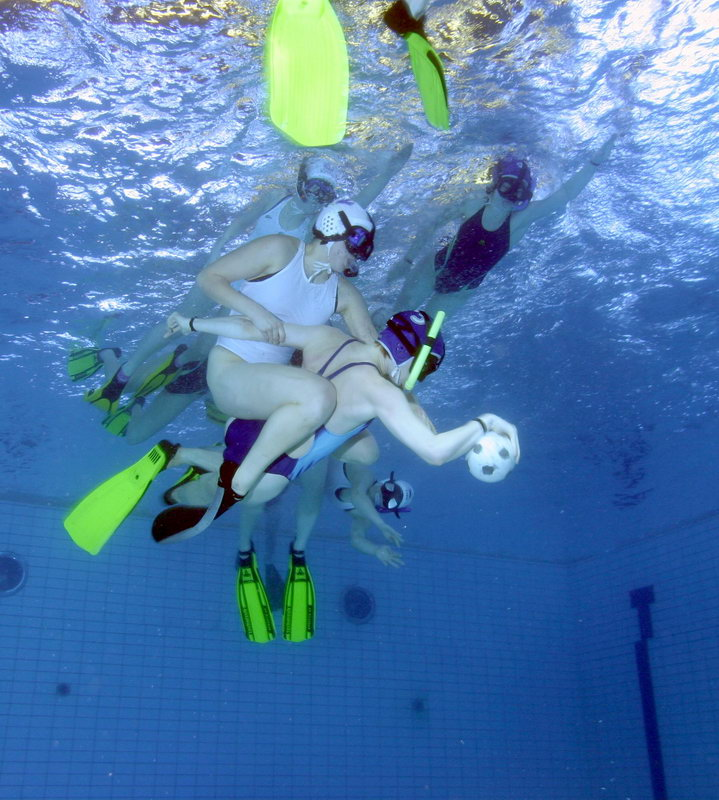
Underwater rugby match (location & date not known).

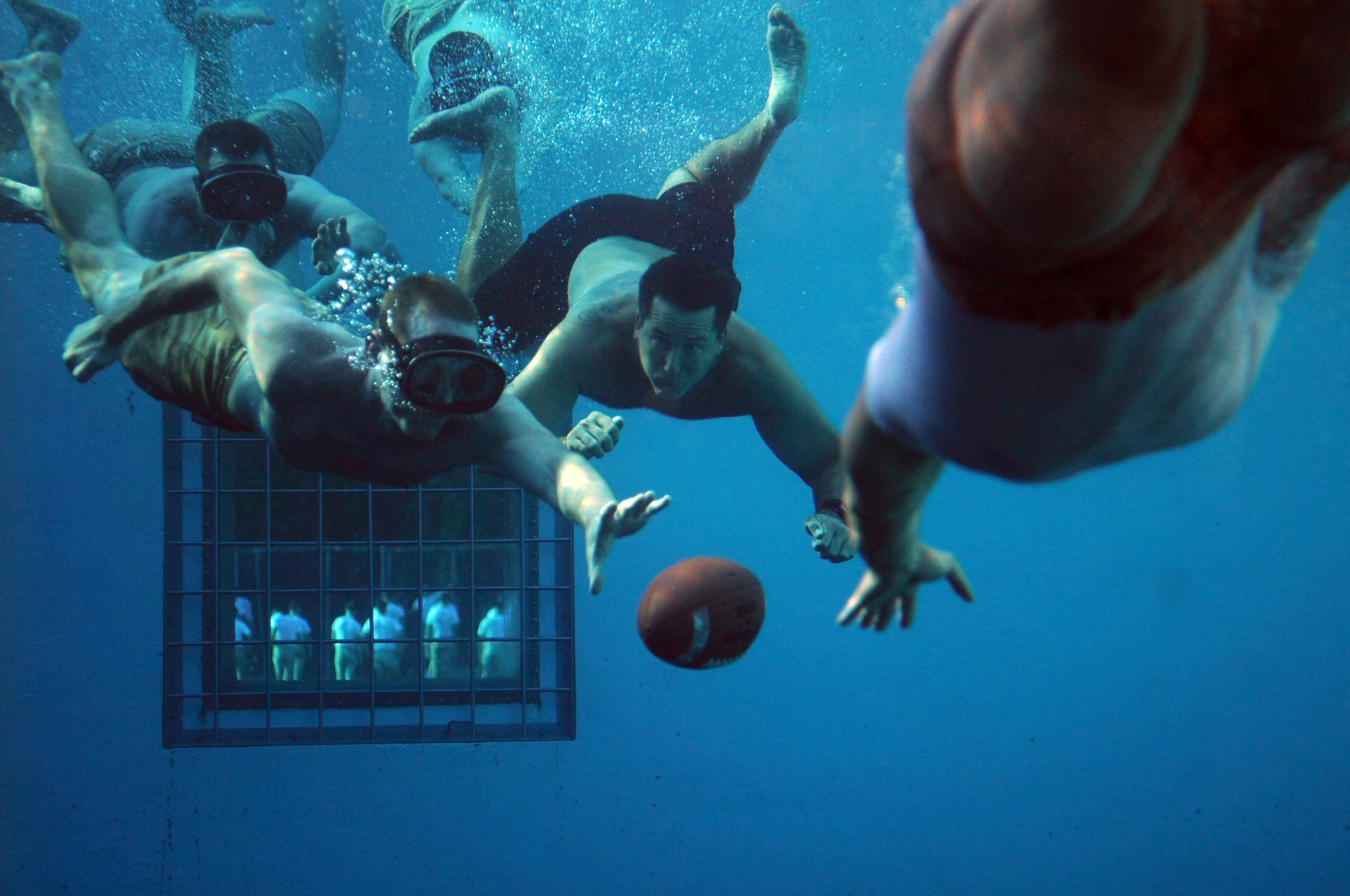
Underwater football match involving USN personnel in Panama City, Florida on June 3, 2011

== See also ==
=== Championships and other international events ===
- Finswimming at the World Games – Trend sport at the World Games
- Finswimming World Championships – International event for the underwater sport of finswimming
- Underwater Hockey World Championships – International event for the sport of Underwater Hockey
- Underwater Orienteering World Championships – International sporting competition
- Underwater Photography World Championships – International event for the sport of underwater photography
- Underwater Rugby World Championships – International sporting competition
- Underwater sports at the 2013 Bolivarian Games – Finswimming, free-diving and spearfishing events at San Lorenzo island
- Underwater hockey at the 2019 Southeast Asian Games – Sporting event in Cavite, Philippines
- Underwater Hockey European Championships – International event for the sport of Underwater Hockey

=== Equipment ===
- Monofin – Single blade swimfin attached to both feet
- Speargun – Underwater fishing implement
- Water polo cap – Headgear used in water polo and a number of underwater sports
