= Underwater rugby =

Underwater team sport

Underwater Rugby
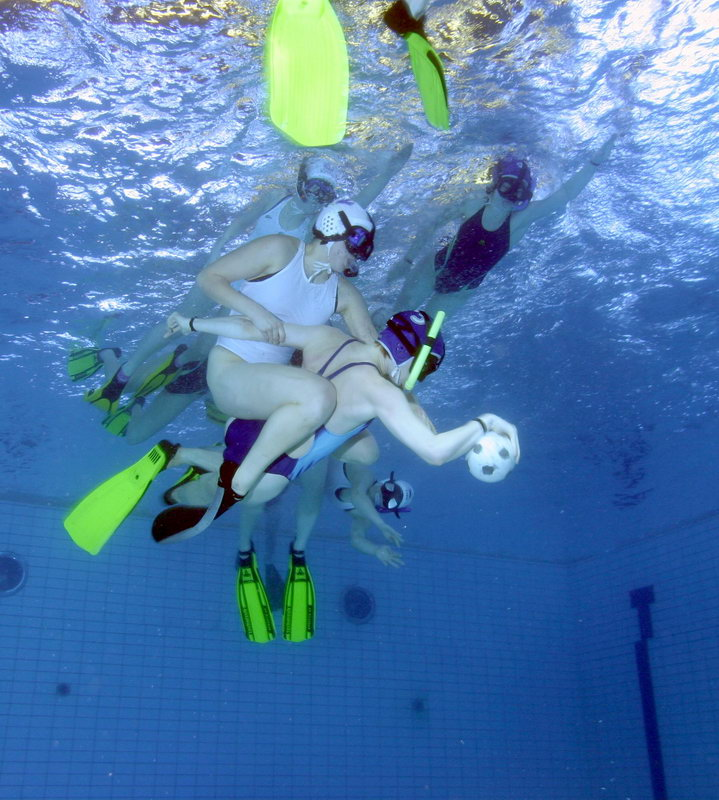
- Underwater rugby match in Norway.
- Highest governing body: CMAS
- Nicknames: UWR
- First played: 1961, Cologne, North Rhine-Westphalia, West Germany

Characteristics
- Contact: Yes
- Team members: 12 (6 in play)
- Mixed-sex: Yes, except at elite levels
- Type: Aquatic
- Equipment: diving mask, snorkel, fins, water polo cap.
- Venue: Swimming pool

Underwater rugby is an underwater team sport in which two teams compete to deliver a negatively buoyant ball into the opponents' goal at the bottom of a swimming pool. It originated from physical fitness training programs in German diving clubs during the early 1960s. It was recognized by the Confédération Mondiale des Activités Subaquatiques (CMAS) in 1978 and was first played in a world championship in 1980. The sport has little in common with rugby football, except for its name.

== History ==
=== Background ===
In 1961, Ludwig von Bersuda, a member of the German Underwater Club (DUC) in Cologne, conceived the idea of an underwater ball game. Since air-filled balls are unsuitable for underwater games due to buoyancy, von Bersuda experimented with a ball filled with saltwater. As saltwater is denser than pool water, the ball slowly sinks to the bottom. The sink rate can be controlled within limits by adjusting the concentration of the salt solution. Water polo balls are used instead of larger traditional balls.

Von Bersuda spanned the middle of the pool with a net, as in volleyball, using a net that stopped one meter above the pool bottom. Two teams played against each other, with the offensive team attempting to carry the ball to the opposing end and put it into a bucket. The new game was born, and the DUC Cologne used it to warm up before regular training. Other teams seeing the game also started to train with saltwater-filled balls.

The "Cologne Discipline" was demonstrated as a competition sport at the National Games in 1963. Although it was one of the first official games with an underwater ball, it did not garner much interest at the time.

=== Clubs ===
Dr. Franz Josef Grimmeisen, a member of the DUC in Duisburg, near Cologne, was instrumental in turning the game into a competitive sport. The German Lifeguard Association (DLRG) of Mülheim had founded a divers' club, and through contact with members of DUC Duisburg, learned of the game. With their help, Grimmeisen arranged the first underwater rugby match between DLRG Mülheim and DUC Duisburg on October 4, 1964. DUC Duisburg won the game 5–2, and the Essener Tageblatt carried the story.

Grimmeisen continued to promote an underwater rugby tournament as a serious competition, and established the first tournament rules, which allowed eight-player teams. A tournament called "Battle for the Golden Ball" took place in Hallenbad Sued, in Mülheim/Ruhr, on November 5, 1965. Six clubs sent teams to Mülheim: DUC Bochum; DUC Düsseldorf, DUC Duisburg, DUC Essen, and TSC Delphin Lüdenscheid. Grimmeisen himself was a part of DUC Duisburg. DLRG Mülheim, the home team, were crowned as the winners. The tournament has been held every year since then, making it the oldest tournament of the sport.

In an attempt to bring the game to the international arena, Grimmeisen turned to two of the most important members of CMAS at the time, France and the USSR. Although he offered demonstration games and press coverage, interest was not forthcoming. Only one French sports magazine, L'Equipe, printed a short article in its April 9, 1965, edition.

The Scandinavian countries showed more interest in the game. Demonstrations in Denmark in 1973 and in Finland in 1975 were effective in generating interest, while games in Belgium in September 1973 and in Vienna in 1979 were not. In the Eastern Bloc, only Czech teams were interested. However, due to the politics of the time, they could only play against teams from other communist countries. The only tournament known to have taken place in Czech is the Underwater Rugby Tournament in Prague, which has taken place every year since 1975, with the exception of 1979. In later years, Polish teams participated in the tournament as well; and teams from East Germany, who used the game for conditioning, sent observers.

Since 1972, as the game became recognized as a sport by the Union of German Sport Divers (VDST), official German Championships have taken place. The first German Championship was held in Mülheim, and was won by TSC Mülheim.

In 1978, underwater rugby was officially recognized by CMAS. The first European Championships took place in Malmö, Sweden in April 1978. The first World Championship was held in Mülheim in May 1980.

In the United States, a different version of water polo became popular, which was similar to underwater rugby. However, around 2014, US teams made the decision to conform to the international water polo rules.

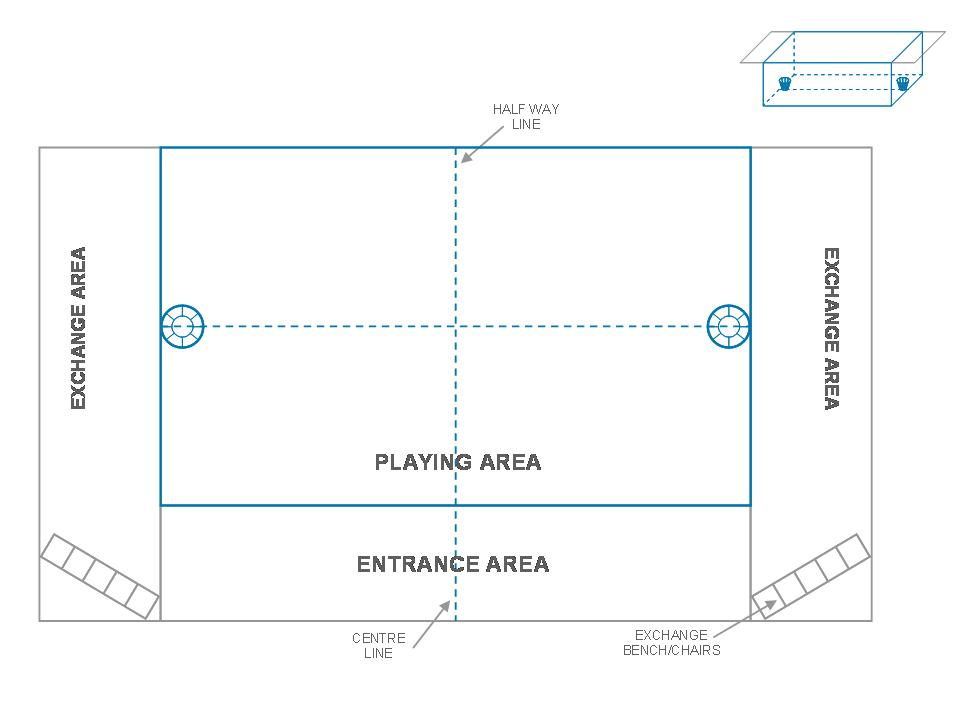
Underwater rugby "pitch"

== Rules ==
Underwater rugby is played in a pool with a depth of 3.5 to 5 meters. The ball is negatively buoyant as it is filled with concentrated saltwater, which sinks at a rate of 1000 to 1200 millimeters per second. The goals are heavy metal buckets with a diameter of about 40cm at the bottom of the pool. Two teams with six players and six additional substitutes compete with each other. Players try to score by sending the ball into the opponents' goal. Substitutes can replace players on the fly.

The ball may be passed in any direction but must not leave the water. The ball floats up to about 2 to 3 meters before water resistance stops it. The players need a variety of abilities like strength, speed, agility, and teamwork to succeed.

== International competitions ==
Major championships have been conducted at the continental level within Europe for senior teams since 1978 and for junior teams since 1986. World championships have been conducted since 1980. A number of regional competitions are also conducted, including the International Underwater Rugby Tournament and the Champions Cup in Europe, and the North American Underwater Rugby Tournament in North America.

=== United Kingdom ===
Underwater Rugby was brought to the United Kingdom by Briton Rob Bonnar and Slovak Oliver Kraus in 2013, who together founded PURE Underwater Rugby Club at Guildford Spectrum Leisure Centre, Guildford. Initially the Leisure Centre denied club activities due to concerns about insurance until Roy Sherwin, a member of the British Sub-Aqua Club (BSAC), helped affiliate the club with BSAC. This led to the formation of other underwater rugby clubs in the United Kingdom, but the number of clubs remains small. BSAC is not affiliated with the world governing body CMAS, and only two clubs are affiliated with BSAC – PURE and Cheltenham Barracudas. The British Underwater Rugby Association (BURA) is the UK's governing body affiliated with CMAS.

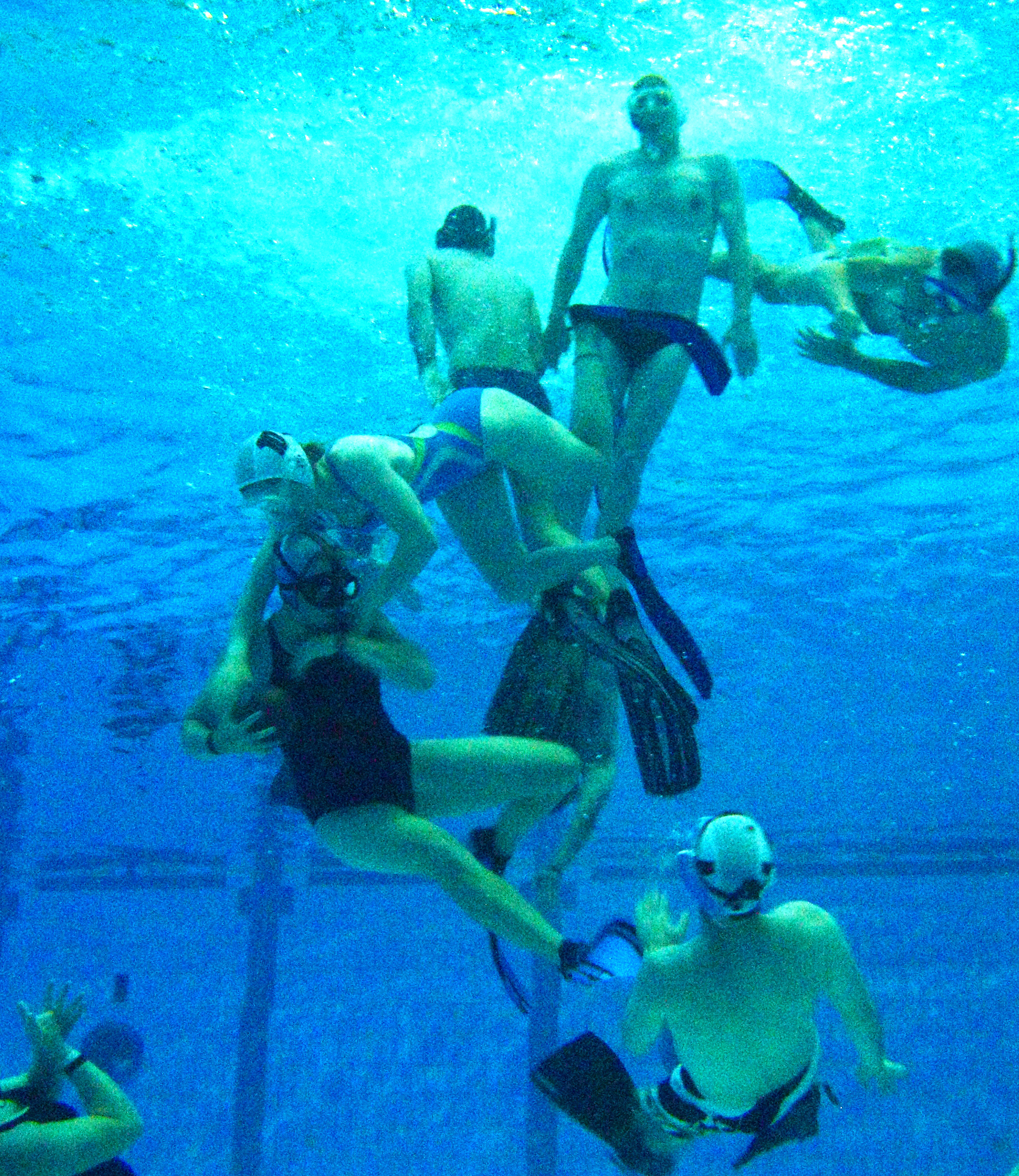
Defensive tackle during an underwater rugby match in Sydney, Australia

== Governing body ==
The governing body for the sport is the Confédération Mondiale des Activités Subaquatiques (CMAS) Underwater Rugby Commission. As of June 2013, the following countries and territories have affiliated with the commission: Australia, Austria, Bosnia-Herzegovina, Colombia, Cyprus, Czech Republic, Denmark, Finland, Germany, Hong Kong, Hungary, Italy, Japan, Norway, Russia, South Africa, Spain, Sweden, Switzerland, Turkey, United States of America and Venezuela.

== See also ==
- Underwater Rugby World Championships – International sporting competition
