= Underwater hockey at the 2019 SEA Games – Men's 6x6 tournament =

Men's 6x6 underwater hockey tournament at the 2019 SEA Games
- Venue: Vermosa Sports Hub
- Dates: 4–5 December
- Nations: 4

Sam Stewart

The men's underwater hockey tournament for 6x6 sides at the 2019 Southeast Asian Games was held at the Vermosa Sports Hub in Imus, Cavite, Philippines.

== Results ==
All times are Philippine Standard Time (UTC+08:00)

=== Round-robin ===
Pos	Team	Pld	W	D	L	GF	GA	GD	Pts
1	Singapore	3	3	0	0	14	3	+11	9
2	Philippines (H)	3	2	0	1	15	4	+11	6
3	Indonesia	3	1	0	2	16	6	+10	3
4	Malaysia	3	0	0	3	0	32	−32	0

First match(es) will be played: 4 December 2019. Source: SEAGames PH 2019 Official Website
(H) Hosts

4 December; 13:15	Report	Malaysia	0–9	Singapore	Vermosa Sports Hub
4 December; 13:15	Report	Scoring by half: 0–5, 0–4			Vermosa Sports Hub

4 December; 13:15	Report	Philippines	3–2	Indonesia	Vermosa Sports Hub
4 December; 13:15	Report	Scoring by half: 1–1, 2–1			Vermosa Sports Hub

4 December; 14:45	Report	Philippines	11–0	Malaysia	Vermosa Sports Hub
4 December; 14:45	Report	Scoring by half: 7–0, 4–0			Vermosa Sports Hub

4 December; 14:45	Report	Indonesia	2–3	Singapore	Vermosa Sports Hub
4 December; 14:45	Report	Scoring by half: 2–1, 0–2			Vermosa Sports Hub

5 December; 9:45	Report	Malaysia	0–12	Indonesia	Vermosa Sports Hub
5 December; 9:45	Report	Scoring by half: 0–4, 0–8			Vermosa Sports Hub

5 December; 9:45	Report	Singapore	2–1	Philippines	Vermosa Sports Hub
5 December; 9:45	Report	Scoring by half: 1–1, 1–0			Vermosa Sports Hub

=== Knockout round ===
Semi-finals
5 December
Singapore	11
Malaysia	0
5 December
Philippines	2 (1)
Indonesia	2 (2)

Gold medal match
5 December
Singapore	4
Indonesia	3
Bronze medal match
5 December
Malaysia	1
Philippines	7

==== Semifinals ====
5 December; 12:00	Report	Singapore	11–0	Malaysia	Vermosa Sports Hub
5 December; 12:00	Report	Scoring by half: 5–0, 6–0			Vermosa Sports Hub

5 December; 12:00	Report	Philippines	2 (1)–2 (2)	Indonesia	Vermosa Sports Hub
5 December; 12:00	Report	Scoring by half: 2–0, 0–2			Vermosa Sports Hub

==== Bronze medal match ====
5 December; 15:00	Report	Malaysia	1–7	Philippines	Vermosa Sports Hub
5 December; 15:00	Report	Scoring by half: 1–5, 0–2			Vermosa Sports Hub

==== Gold medal match ====
5 December; 17:00	Report	Singapore	4–3	Indonesia	Vermosa Sports Hub
5 December; 17:00	Report	Scoring by half: 2–1, 2–2			Vermosa Sports Hub

== Final standings ==
Rank	Team
1st place, gold medalist(s)	Singapore
2nd place, silver medalist(s)	Indonesia
3rd place, bronze medalist(s)	Philippines
4	Malaysia

== See also ==
- Women's 6x6 tournament
