= Underwater hockey at the 2019 SEA Games – Men's 4x4 tournament =

Men's 4x4 underwater hockey tournament at the 2019 SEA Games
- Venue: Vermosa Sports Hub
- Dates: 2–3 December
- Nations: 4

The men's underwater hockey tournament for 4x4 sides at the 2019 Southeast Asian Games was held at the Vermosa Sports Hub in Imus, Cavite, Philippines.

== Results ==
All times are Philippine Standard Time (UTC+08:00)

=== Round-robin ===
Pos	Team	Pld	W	D	L	GF	GA	GD	Pts
1	Singapore	3	2	1	0	13	5	+8	7
2	Philippines (H)	3	1	2	0	12	5	+7	5
3	Indonesia	3	1	1	1	13	5	+8	4
4	Malaysia	3	0	0	3	2	25	−23	0

First match(es) will be played: 2 December 2019. Source: SEAGames PH 2019 Official Website
(H) Hosts

2 December; 11:00	Report	Malaysia	2–9	Singapore	Vermosa Sports Hub
2 December; 11:00	Report	Scoring by half: 0–4, 2–5			Vermosa Sports Hub

2 December; 11:00	Report	Philippines	3–3	Indonesia	Vermosa Sports Hub
2 December; 11:00	Report	Scoring by half: 2–1, 1–2			Vermosa Sports Hub

2 December; 14:00	Report	Philippines	7–0	Malaysia	Vermosa Sports Hub
2 December; 14:00	Report	Scoring by half: 2–0, 5–0			Vermosa Sports Hub

2 December; 14:00	Report	Indonesia	1–2	Singapore	Vermosa Sports Hub
2 December; 14:00	Report	Scoring by half: 1–0, 0–2			Vermosa Sports Hub

2 December; 15:00	Report	Malaysia	0–9	Indonesia	Vermosa Sports Hub
2 December; 15:00	Report	Scoring by half: 0-4, 0-5			Vermosa Sports Hub

2 December; 15:00	Report	Singapore	2–2	Philippines	Vermosa Sports Hub
2 December; 15:00	Report	Scoring by half: 1-1, 1-1			Vermosa Sports Hub

=== Knockout round ===
Semi-finals
4 December
Singapore	8
Malaysia	1
4 December
Philippines	3
Indonesia	2

Gold medal match
4 December
Singapore	5
Philippines	0
Bronze medal match
4 December
Malaysia	1
Indonesia	7

==== Semifinals ====
4 December; 9:00	Report	Singapore	8–1	Malaysia	Vermosa Sports Hub
4 December; 9:00	Report	Scoring by half: 5–1, 3–0			Vermosa Sports Hub

4 December; 9:00	Report	Philippines	3–2	Indonesia	Vermosa Sports Hub
4 December; 9:00	Report	Scoring by half: 0–1, 3–1			Vermosa Sports Hub

==== Bronze medal match ====
4 December; 10:30	Report	Malaysia	1–7	Indonesia	Vermosa Sports Hub
4 December; 10:30	Report	Scoring by half: 0–3, 1–4			Vermosa Sports Hub

==== Gold medal match ====
4 December; 11:30	Report	Singapore	5–0	Philippines	Vermosa Sports Hub
4 December; 11:30	Report	Scoring by half: 3–0, 2–0			Vermosa Sports Hub

== Final standings ==
Rank	Team
1st place, gold medalist(s)	Singapore
2nd place, silver medalist(s)	Philippines
3rd place, bronze medalist(s)	Indonesia
4	Malaysia

== See also ==
- Women's 4x4 tournament
