= Underwater hockey at the 2019 SEA Games – Women's 4x4 tournament =

Women's 4x4 underwater hockey tournament at the 2017 SEA Games
- Venue: Vermosa Sports Hub
- Dates: 2–3 December
- Nations: 4

The women's underwater hockey tournament for 4x4 sides at the 2019 Southeast Asian Games was held at the Vermosa Sports Hub in Imus, Cavite, Philippines.

== Results ==
All times are Philippine Standard Time (UTC+08:00)

=== Round-robin ===
Pos	Team	Pld	W	D	L	GF	GA	GD	Pts
1	Singapore	3	3	0	0	21	1	+20	9
2	Philippines (H)	3	2	0	1	14	2	+12	6
3	Indonesia	3	1	0	2	8	15	−7	3
4	Malaysia	3	0	0	3	1	26	−25	0

First match(es) will be played: 2 December 2019. Source: SEAGames PH 2019 Official Website
(H) Hosts

2 December; 12:00	Report	Malaysia	0–11	Singapore	Vermosa Sports Hub
2 December; 12:00	Report	Scoring by half: 0–5, 0–6			Vermosa Sports Hub

2 December; 12:00	Report	Philippines	6–0	Indonesia	Vermosa Sports Hub
2 December; 12:00	Report	Scoring by half: 3–0, 3–0			Vermosa Sports Hub

2 December; 14:00	Report	Philippines	7–0	Malaysia	Vermosa Sports Hub
2 December; 14:00	Report	Scoring by half: 5-0, 2-0			Vermosa Sports Hub

2 December; 14:00	Report	Indonesia	0–8	Singapore	Vermosa Sports Hub
2 December; 14:00	Report	Scoring by half: 0-5, 0-3			Vermosa Sports Hub

2 December; 16:00	Report	Malaysia	1–8	Indonesia	Vermosa Sports Hub
2 December; 16:00	Report	Scoring by half: 0-4, 1-4			Vermosa Sports Hub

2 December; 16:00	Report	Singapore	2–1	Philippines	Vermosa Sports Hub
2 December; 16:00	Report	Scoring by half: 2-0, 0-1			Vermosa Sports Hub

=== Knockout round ===
Semi-finals
4 December
Singapore	9
Malaysia	0
4 December
Philippines	5
Indonesia	2

Gold medal match
4 December
Singapore	4
Philippines	2
Bronze medal match
4 December
Malaysia	1
Indonesia	5

==== Semifinals ====
4 December; 9:30	Report	Singapore	9–0	Malaysia	Vermosa Sports Hub
4 December; 9:30	Report	Scoring by half: 5–0, 4–0			Vermosa Sports Hub

4 December; 9:30	Report	Philippines	5–2	Indonesia	Vermosa Sports Hub
4 December; 9:30	Report	Scoring by half: 2–2, 3–0			Vermosa Sports Hub

==== Bronze medal match ====
4 December; 11:00	Report	Malaysia	1–5	Indonesia	Vermosa Sports Hub
4 December; 11:00	Report	Scoring by half: 0–3, 1–2			Vermosa Sports Hub

==== Gold medal match ====
4 December; 12:00	[	Singapore	4–2	Philippines	Vermosa Sports Hub
4 December; 12:00	[	Scoring by half: 2–0, 2–2			Vermosa Sports Hub

== Final standings ==
Rank	Team
1st place, gold medalist(s)	Singapore
2nd place, silver medalist(s)	Philippines
3rd place, bronze medalist(s)	Indonesia
4	Malaysia

== See also ==
- Men's 4x4 tournament
