= Underwater hockey at the 2019 SEA Games – Women's 6x6 tournament =

Women's 6x6 underwater hockey tournament at the 2019 SEA Games
- Venue: Vermosa Sports Hub
- Dates: 4–5 December
- Nations: 4

The women's underwater hockey tournament for 6x6 sides at the 2019 Southeast Asian Games was held at the Vermosa Sports Hub in Imus, Cavite, Philippines.

== Results ==
All times are Philippine Standard Time (UTC+08:00)

=== Round-robin ===
Pos	Team	Pld	W	D	L	GF	GA	GD	Pts
1	Singapore	3	3	0	0	21	1	+20	9
2	Philippines (H)	3	2	0	1	15	3	+12	6
3	Indonesia	3	1	0	2	11	9	+2	3
4	Malaysia	3	0	0	3	0	34	−34	0

First match(es) will be played: 4 December 2019. Source: SEAGames PH 2019 Official Website
(H) Hosts

4 December; 14:00	Report	Malaysia	0–12	Singapore	Vermosa Sports Hub
4 December; 14:00	Report	Scoring by half: 0–7, 0–5			Vermosa Sports Hub

4 December; 14:00	Report	Philippines	3–0	Indonesia	Vermosa Sports Hub
4 December; 14:00	Report	Scoring by half: 1–0, 2–0			Vermosa Sports Hub

4 December; 15:30	Report	Philippines	12–0	Malaysia	Vermosa Sports Hub
4 December; 15:30	Report	Scoring by half: 6–0, 6–0			Vermosa Sports Hub

4 December; 15:30	Report	Indonesia	1–6	Singapore	Vermosa Sports Hub
4 December; 15:30	Report	Scoring by half: 0–3, 1–3			Vermosa Sports Hub

5 December; 9:00	Report	Malaysia	0–10	Indonesia	Vermosa Sports Hub
5 December; 9:00	Report	Scoring by half: 0–5, 0–5			Vermosa Sports Hub

5 December; 9:00	Report	Singapore	3–0	Philippines	Vermosa Sports Hub
5 December; 9:00	Report	Scoring by half: 1–0, 2–0			Vermosa Sports Hub

=== Knockout round ===
Semi-finals
5 December
Singapore	18
Malaysia	0
5 December
Philippines	2
Indonesia	1

Gold medal match
5 December
Singapore	3
Philippines	0
Bronze medal match
5 December
Malaysia	0
Indonesia	8

==== Semifinals ====
5 December; 11:00	Report	Singapore	18–0	Malaysia	Vermosa Sports Hub
5 December; 11:00	Report	Scoring by half: 10–0, 8–0			Vermosa Sports Hub

5 December; 11:00	Report	Philippines	2–1	Indonesia	Vermosa Sports Hub
5 December; 11:00	Report	Scoring by half: 1–1, 1–0			Vermosa Sports Hub

==== Bronze medal match ====
5 December; 14:00	Report	Malaysia	0–8	Indonesia	Vermosa Sports Hub
5 December; 14:00	Report	Scoring by half: 0–5, 0–3			Vermosa Sports Hub

==== Gold medal match ====
5 December; 16:00	Report	Singapore	3–0	Philippines	Vermosa Sports Hub
5 December; 16:00	Report	Scoring by half: 0–1, 0–2			Vermosa Sports Hub

== Final standings ==
Rank	Team
1st place, gold medalist(s)	Singapore
2nd place, silver medalist(s)	Philippines
3rd place, bronze medalist(s)	Indonesia
4	Malaysia

== See also ==
- Men's 6x6 tournament
