= Underwater Photography World Championships =

International event for the sport of underwater photography

The Underwater Photography World Championships is the peak international event for the underwater sport of underwater photography. The event is conducted on behalf of the Confédération Mondiale des Activités Subaquatiques (CMAS) by an affiliated national federation. The championships was first held in 1985. Two variants of the championship are offered. The first is held at an open water site and has been conducted on 16 occasions as of November 2017. Its official title often includes the world ‘sea’ in order to distinguish it from the second which is held in a swimming pool. The swimming pool variant which is concerned with a number of creative categories has held twice with a third championship scheduled for Bari, Italy during 2004 being cancelled due to low competitor registration.

== History ==
Year	Date	Championship	Location event	# Nations	# Teams
1985	January 1 – 2	1st World Championship	Genoa, Italy	-	-
1987	June 17 – 18	2nd World Championship	Costa Brava, Spain	-	-
1990	September 19 – 24	3rd World Championship	Milazzo, Italy	-	-
1992	August 11 – 14	4th World Championship	Isla de la Juventud, Cuba	-	-
1994	September 25 – 30	5th World Championship	Jeju, South Korea	-	-
1996	October 6 – 12	6th World Championship	Menorca, Spain	-	-
1997	May 8 – 11	1st World Championships Underwater Photography - Swimming Pool	Paris, France	-	-
1998	September 13 – 18	7th World Championship	Ålesund, Norway	-	-
2000	June 10 – 15	8th World Championship	Hurghada, Egypt	-	-
2001	September 16	2nd World Championships Underwater Photography - Swimming Pool	Copenhagen, Denmark	-	-
2002	August 26 – 29	9th World Championship	Marseille, France	-	-
2005	September 13 – 18	10th World Championship	L'Estartit, Spain	-	42
2007	May 9 – 14	11th World Championship	Port Louis, Mauritius	16	26
2009	May 31 – June 5	12th World Championship	Jeju, South Korea	20	-
2011	May 26 – 31	13th World Championship	Bodrum, Turkey	-	-
2013	April 9 – 14	14th World Championship	Cayo Largo, Cuba	18	78
2015	May 21 – 25th	15th CMAS Underwater Photography World Championship	Zeeland, Netherlands	20	-
2017	Nov 22 – 17	16th World Championship	La Paz, Mexico	20	35

== Future championships ==
The 17th CMAS Underwater Photography World Championship will be held at Tenerife from October 15–20, 2019, Spain. The next CMAS Underwater Photography World Championship Swimming Pool will be held November 13–17, 2019 in Berlin, Germany.

== See also ==
- Orhan Aytür – Turkish professor of optoelectronics and underwater photographer
