= Hockey in Turkey =

Hockey in Turkey may refer to:

== Field hockey/Indoor hockey/Hockey5s ==
- Turkish Hockey Federation

== Ice hockey ==
- Turkish Ice Hockey Federation
- Turkish Ice Hockey Super League

== Other ==
- Underwater hockey in Turkey
