= UWH =

UWH is an abbreviation that may mean

- UnderWater Hockey
- UNESCO World Heritage
