= Hockey in Australia =

Hockey in Australia may refer to:

- Field hockey in Australia
- Ice hockey in Australia
- Underwater hockey in Australia
