= Turkish Underwater Sports Federation =

Turkish national governing body for underwater sport and lifesaving

Turkish Underwater Sports Federation Türkiye Sualtı Sporları Federasyonu
- Sport: Underwater sports Lifesaving
- Abbreviation: (TSSF)
- Founded: 1982
- Affiliation: CMAS; ILS
- Location: Ankara, Turkey
- President: Kadir Sağlam

Official website
- www.tssf.gov.tr/EN/home

Turkish Underwater Sports Federation (Turkish: Türkiye Sualtı Sporları Federasyonu, TSSF) is the governing body for both underwater sports and lifesaving in Turkey. Founded in 1982 and based in Ankara, the TSSF is a member of both the Confédération Mondiale des Activités Subaquatiques (CMAS) and the International Life Saving Federation (ILS). Its president is Ahmet İnkılap Obruk, who was also elected in 2009 to CMAS' board of directors for a term of four years.

== Organization ==
Currently, the TSSF oversees following ten activities and sports branches:

- Life saving
- Scuba diving
- Underwater target shooting
- Finswimming
- Apnea
- Underwater photography and videography
- Underwater hockey
- Underwater orienteering
- Underwater rugby
- Spearfishing

The federation operates a number of training centers for diving and life saving across the country. There are decompression chambers in eleven cities of Turkey available for use also by TSSF members.

== International diving certificate ==
The diving certification of CMAS* SCUBA Diver issued by the federation upon completion of a study course at one of its training centers is internationally recognized.

== Notable sportspeople ==
- Orhan Aytür (born 1965), 2011 World champion in underwater photography
- Yasemin Dalkılıç (born 1979), World record holder female free-diver
- Şahika Ercümen (born 1985), World record holder female free-diver
- Devrim Cenk Ulusoy (born 1973), World record holder free-diver
