= Underwater hockey in Australia =

Victoria versus Western Australia at the 2004 Nationals in Tasmania, Australia.

Underwater hockey has been played in Australia since 1966 and is played in most states and territories. As of September 2013, Australia has been very successful at the international level finishing in the top three 43 times including being the world champion in various divisions 23 times out of 53 appearances at 17 international events.

== History ==
Underwater hockey has been played in Australia since 1966. Its introduction is attributed to Norm Leibeck, an Australian who returned from Canada both with Marlene, his Canadian bride, and a recently acquired knowledge of underwater hockey then known as Octopush. The first Australian Underwater Hockey Championships was held in 1975 at Margaret River, Western Australia as part of the Australian Skindiving Convention (now called the Australian Underwater Championships). A Women's division was added to the championships in 1981 and a Junior division commenced in 1990.

== Governance ==
The peak body is the Underwater Hockey Commission (known as Underwater Hockey Australia) of the Australian Underwater Federation (AUF). There are state commissions in all states and territories with the exception of the Northern Territory. Underwater hockey has a coaching stream as part of the AUF's coaching program in underwater sport with two levels being accredited with the Australian Government's National Coaching Accreditation Scheme (NCAS).

== Domestic competitions ==
Underwater hockey is played at venues in the Australian Capital Territory, New South Wales, Queensland, South Australia, Tasmania, Victoria and Western Australia. The national championships are held annually and as an event separate from the Australian Underwater Championships since 1994.

As of 2017, the Australia nationals have six separate divisions based on age and gender – Under 15, Under 19 Mixed, Under 19 Women's, Masters, Masters Women, Elite Women's and Elite Open.

== National team ==
Current National Team.

Players aspiring to represent Australia at international level may need to maintain a demanding training schedule, which can include:

- Multiple pool training sessions each week.
- Additional swimming and cardiovascular conditioning.
- Strength and conditioning sessions outside the pool.
- Regular competitive games and tournaments.
- State and national training camps.
- Travel for competitions and selection events.
- Independent training and recovery between organized sessions.

Training schedules can become particularly demanding in the lead-up to national championships and international competitions. Players often need to balance training with full-time employment, university, education, family responsibilities and other commitments.

There is no single training schedule that applies to every Australian representative. The requirements vary according to the team, coach, competition and individual athlete.

Below you can find the National teams That went away and represented Australia at the 21st CMAS World Championship held in Gold coast in 2023

Elite Open
Cap #	Player	Home State
1	Thomas Miller (C)	Western Australia
2	Josh Mckenzie	Western Australia
3	Hunter Jones	Western Australia
4	Shannon Griffith (VC)	Western Australia
5	Amar Samiento	Western Australia
6	Rhys Milburn	Western Australia
7	Todd Canavan	Western Australia
8	Gavin Wise	Western Australia
9	Andre Dufall	Western Australia
10	Joel Hattie	New South Wales
11	Gary Roseworn	Queensland
13	Mason Gillespie	Western Australia
Coach	Greg Bush	Western Australia

cthe elite men finished the round robin in 3rd place with a strong performance. Come the final series the Australian men were up against great Brittin in the quatre finals, with the pressure proving to be too much for their home country and falling short by a goal. which lead them to finish 6th in the world championships.

Elite Women
Cap #	Player	Home State
1	Samantha Blackham	Western Australia
2	Gabrielle Larsson	Tasmania
3	Kamilla Reyes Perdomo	Western Australia
4	Kathryn Howard (VC)	Queensland
5	Kasey Hoskins	Western Australia
6	Elize Game	Tasmania
7	Briody Hilder	Tasmania
8	Zoe Canavan	Western Australia
9	Camille White	Tasmania
10	Catalina Chica	New South Wales
12	Sarah Tindal	New South Wales
13	Alice Van Der Woude	Tasmania
Coach	Stewart Parkinson	New South Wales

Australian Elite Women had a shakey start to the competition, but despite all odds of finishing 7th in the round robin, they went undefeated throughout the finals series and managed to defeat the French Elite Women in the grand final, taking home Gold.

Masters Men
Cap #	Player	Home State
2	Tim Senior	Queensland
3	Luke Newlyn	Queensland
4	Karl Paton	Queensland
5	Jason Miezis	Western Australia
6	Jacko Smit	New South Wales
7	Ryan Heckenberg	New South Wales
8	Kevin Chisholm	Victoria
9	Stewart Parkinson (VC)	New South Wales
10	Matthew Mihatov	Queensland
11	David Barry-Macaulay	Queensland
12	James Rositer (C)	Queensland
13	Patrick Kelly	Western Australia
Coach	Jason Miezis	Western Australia

Australian Masters men had a very close round robin, battling sickness with a few players having to remain on the sidelines. Unfortunately, they fell just short in the bronze medal match finishing the competition in 4th place.

Masters Women
Cap #	Player	Home State
1	Andrea Van Eyssen	New South Wales
2	Melissa Paton	Queensland
3	Eden Brown	New South Wales
4	Bronwyn McKenzie	Western Australia
5	Marion Creser	New South Wales
6	Fiona Walsh	Tasmania
7	Belinda Keeley	Victoria
8	Danielle Hunt	Tasmania
9	Meegan Kepert	Victoria
10	Lena Plambeck	New South Wales
11	Jane Gilligan	Western Australia
12	Alexandra Doughty	Tasmania
13	Kirsteen Reid	Victoria
Coach	Lena Plembeck	New South Wales

The Master's Women showed their dominance at the competition with a very experienced team. Battling their way into the grand final where they met the French Masters women, but unfortunately the French were too strong and took home the gold medal against the Australians 2-0.

Australia has played at world level since the inaugural world championship event in 1980. Australia did not send teams to the 15th CMAS World Championship in 2007 or to the 16th CMAS World Championship in 2009.

=== At the World Championships ===
Year	Championship	Location event	Elite		Masters		U-19		U-23/24	
Year	Championship	Location event	Men	Women	Men	Women	Men	Women	Men	Women
1980	1st CMAS World Championship	Vancouver, British Columbia, Canada	3	No event	No event	No event	No event	No event	No event	No event
1982	2nd CMAS World Championship	Brisbane, Australia	1	1	No event	No event	No event	No event	No event	No event
1984	3rd CMAS World Championship	Chicago, United States	1	1	No event	No event	No event	No event	No event	No event
1986	4th CMAS World Championship	Adelaide, Australia	2	1	No event	No event	No event	No event	No event	No event
1988	5th CMAS World Championship	Amersfoort, Netherlands	1	3	No event	No event	No event	No event	No event	No event
1990	6th CMAS World Championship	Montreal, Quebec, Canada	1	1	No event	No event	No event	No event	No event	No event
1992	7th CMAS World Championship	Wellington, New Zealand	1	2	1	No event	No event	No event	No event	No event
1994	8th CMAS World Championship	Grand Couronne, France	1	1	3	No event	No event	No event	No event	No event
1996	9th CMAS World Championship	Durban, South Africa	1	2	2	No event	No event	No event	No event	No event
1998	10th CMAS World Championship	San José, United States	3	2	4	DNP‡	No event	No event	No event	No event
2000	11th CMAS World Championship	Hobart, Australia	1	1	1	2	No event	No event	No event	No event
2002	12th CMAS World Championship	Calgary, Alberta, Canada	1	1	5	2	DNP‡	No event	No event	No event
2004	13th CMAS World Championship	Christchurch, New Zealand	2	3	2	2	3	DNP‡	No event	No event
2006	14th CMAS World Championship	Sheffield, United Kingdom	4	1	6	DNP‡			No event	No event
2007	Disputed 15th World Championship (Part of 1st CMAS Games)	Bari, Italy	DNP‡						No event	No event
2008	Alternative 15th World Championship and 1st Junior World Championship (1st WAA World Championships)	Durban, South Africa	4	1	5	No event	DNP‡		No event	No event
2009	16th World Championship	Kranj, Slovenia	DNP‡		No event				No event	No event
2011	17th CMAS World Championship	Coimbra, Portugal	1	2	No event				No event	No event
2013	18th CMAS World Championship	Eger, Hungary	3	4	1	1	Held separately			
2016	19th CMAS World Championship	Stellenbosch, South Africa	1	6	1	1	Held separately			
2018	20th CMAS World Championship	Quebec City, Canada	7	6	6	2	Held separately			
2023	21st CMAS World Championship	Gold Coast, Australia	6	1	4	2	Held separately			

‡ DNP= Did not participate

CMAS Intercontinental Championships
Year	Championships	Location	Elites open		Masters Men	
Year	Championships	Location	Men	Women	Men	Women
2025	1st CMAS Intercontinental Championships - Asia & Oceania	Malaysia, Kuala Lumpa	2	2	2	1

=== At the Junior World Championships ===
Year	Championship	Location event	Men's U-19	Women's U-19	Men's U-23/24	Women's U-23/24
2013	2nd Junior World Championship	Eger, Hungary	4	4	2	?
2015	3rd Junior World Championship	Castellón de la Plana, Spain	6	8	2	4
2017	4th Junior World Championship	Hobart, Australia	4	2	5	6
2019	5th Junior World Championship	Sheffield, United Kingdom	Did not participate		6	Did not participate
2024	6th Junior World Championship	Kuala Lumpur, Malaysia	4	1	2	5
2026	7th Junior World Championship	(Turkey) Gebze, Türkiye	5	8	3	6

== See also ==
- Adelaide Aquatic Centre – Indoor swimming pool complex in Adelaide, South Australia
- Gold Coast Aquatic Centre – Swimming venue in Southport, Queensland
- Hobart Aquatic Centre – Aquatic sporting facility in Hobart, Australia
- Leongatha
- St Michael's Collegiate School
- Sleeman Centre (Brisbane) – Sporting and entertainment facility located in Brisbane, Queensland
- Underwater Hockey World Championships – International event for the sport of Underwater Hockey
