= UAAP Season 88 football tournaments =

Association football tournament

UAAP Season 88
- "Strength in Motion, Hope in Action"
- Host school: University of the Philippines Diliman
Men's Finals	G1 (a.e.t.)	Wins
UP Fighting Maroons	2	1
FEU Tamaraws	1	0
- Arena(s): Rizal Memorial Stadium, Manila
- Finals MVP: Florenz Tacardon, Charles Lobitaña
- Winning coach: Popoy Clarino
- Semifinalists: UST Growling Tigers; De La Salle Green Archers
- TV network(s): One Sports; UAAP Varsity Channel
Women's Finals	G1	Wins
FEU Lady Tamaraws	2	1
DLSU Lady Booters	0	0
- Arena(s): UP Diliman Football Stadium, Quezon City
- Finals MVP: Jonela Albino
- Winning coach: Let Dimzon
Juniors' Finals	G1	Wins
FEU–D Baby Tamaraws	2	1
UST Tiger Cubs	1	0
- Arena(s): UP Diliman Football Stadium, Quezon City
- Finals MVP: James Maxdell Torres
- Winning coach: Albert Besa
- Semifinalists: Zobel Junior Archers; Southridge Admirals

UAAP Season 88 football tournaments are the University Athletic Association of the Philippines (UAAP) football tournaments for its 88th season. The collegiate tournaments started on September 20, 2025. Both the collegiate and high school divisions were played at the Ayala Vermosa Sports Hub Athletics Center in Imus, Cavite, and the UP Diliman Football Stadium in Quezon City, Metro Manila. The collegiate women's tournament began on September 20 while the men's tournament followed the day after on September 21.

In a unique move for this season, the league will play the first round of eliminations until October, while the second round will continue until November, before resuming in January of the next year to give way for the national teams at the 2025 FIFA Women's Futsal World Cup and the 2025 SEA Games.

This is the tenth season with Rely San Agustin as the league commissioner, while University of the Philippines is the tournament's sub-host.

== Tournament format ==
The UAAP continued to use the UAAP Final Four format for the Men's and High School Boys' divisions with a double round-robin elimination round format.

A stepladder format will be enacted if a team sweeps the elimination round. However, if no team sweeps the elimination round, the league reverts to the usual twice-to-beat advantage in the Final Four for the higher-seeded teams, which will be implemented for the first time since Season 76.

The Women's division will also feature a double round-robin elimination round with the top two teams proceeding to the finals.

== Men's tournament ==
=== Elimination round ===
==== Team standings ====
Pos	Team	Pld	W	D	L	GF	GA	GD	Pts	Qualification
1	UP Fighting Maroons (H)	12	9	2	1	20	7	+13	29	Twice-to-beat in the semifinals
2	FEU Tamaraws	12	8	2	2	23	8	+15	26	Twice-to-beat in the semifinals
3	UST Golden Booters	12	5	3	4	16	16	0	18	Twice-to-win in the semifinals
4	De La Salle Green Booters	12	4	4	4	14	12	+2	16	Twice-to-win in the semifinals
5	Ateneo Blue Eagles	12	4	3	5	21	18	+3	15	
6	Adamson Soaring Falcons	12	2	4	6	11	20	−9	10	
7	UE Red Warriors (Note: The UAAP Disciplinary Committee penalized UE with a deduction of three points in the league table following their walk-out in their September 28 match against Ateneo. The sanction is grounded in Article 30 of the PFF Disciplinary Code—Deduction of Points which allows for the removal of points in current or future PFF competitions.)	12	1	0	11	9	33	−24	0	

Source: The UAAP
(H) Hosts

==== Match-up results ====
	Round 1						Round 2					
Team ╲ Game	1	2	3	4	5	6	7	8	9	10	11	12
Adamson Soaring Falcons	Ateneo school colors	UST school colors	FEU school colors	UE school colors	UP school colors	La Salle school colors	Ateneo school colors	FEU school colors	La Salle school colors	UST school colors	UE school colors	UP school colors
Ateneo Blue Eagles	Adamson school colors	UE school colors	UST school colors	La Salle school colors	UP school colors	FEU school colors	Adamson school colors	UP school colors	UE school colors	La Salle school colors	UST school colors	FEU school colors
De La Salle Green Booters	UST school colors	UE school colors	UP school colors	Ateneo school colors	Adamson school colors	FEU school colors	UST school colors	Adamson school colors	Ateneo school colors	FEU school colors	UE school colors	UP school colors
FEU Tamaraws	UP school colors	Adamson school colors	UST school colors	UE school colors	Ateneo school colors	La Salle school colors	UE school colors	Adamson school colors	UP school colors	La Salle school colors	Ateneo school colors	UST school colors
UE Red Warriors	UP school colors	La Salle school colors	Ateneo school colors	Adamson school colors	FEU school colors	UST school colors	FEU school colors	UP school colors	UST school colors	Ateneo school colors	Adamson school colors	La Salle school colors
UP Fighting Maroons	UE school colors	FEU school colors	La Salle school colors	Adamson school colors	Ateneo school colors	UST school colors	UE school colors	Ateneo school colors	FEU school colors	Adamson school colors	UST school colors	La Salle school colors
UST Golden Booters	La Salle school colors	Adamson school colors	Ateneo school colors	FEU school colors	UP school colors	UE school colors	La Salle school colors	UE school colors	Adamson school colors	Ateneo school colors	UP school colors	FEU school colors

Source: The UAAP
= Win; = Draw; = Loss

==== Results ====
School	AdU	ATENEO	DLSU	FEU	UE	UP	UST
Adamson Soaring Falcons		0–3	1–3	0–3	3–0	0–1	2–2
Ateneo Blue Eagles	4–0		1–1	1–1	3–4	2–3	2–1
De La Salle Green Booters	1–1	1–1		1–3	1–0	0–0	1–2
FEU Tamaraws	1–0	2–0	1–0		2–0	1–3	1–1
UE Red Warriors	2–4	1–3	0–3	1–4		0–1	0–2
UP Fighting Maroons	0–0	1–0	1–2	1–0	5–0		2–1
UST Golden Booters	0–0	3–1	1–0	0–4	2–1	1–2	

Source: The UAAP
Legend: Blue = left column team win; Yellow = draw; Red = top row team win.

=== Playoffs Bracket ===
Semifinals (Top 2 twice-to-beat)
1	UP (a.e.t.)	1
4	La Salle	0
2	FEU	1	3
3	UST	2	2

Final (Knockout)
1	UP (a.e.t.)	2
2	FEU	1

=== Semifinals ===
The top two seeds have the twice-to-beat advantage where they have to win just once, while their opponents twice, to progress, provided no team wins all 12 elimination round games. If a team wins all elimination round games, the #2, #3 and #4 seeds figure in a single-elimination tournament to determine the #1 team's opponent in the finals.

==== (1) UP vs. (4) La Salle ====
UP secured the first semifinals berth after their victory against Ateneo. They then clinched the twice-to-beat advantage with their win against FEU and the top seed after their win against UST. La Salle's win against UP at the last game of the elimination rounds gave them the #4 seed.

The semifinal between the Fighting Maroons and the Green Booters threatened to go to kicks from the penalty mark, but UP found a chance when DLSU defender Frank Labayen was called for a foul just outside the box. Within range, Ramil Bation III outsmarted Jason Salavante in the ensuing free kick, scoring at the death to send his side to a second Final appearance in three seasons.

February 8, 2026
19:00

UP Fighting Maroons	1–0 (a.e.t.)	De La Salle Green Archers
Ramil Bation III 120+7'

Rizal Memorial Stadium, Manila
Referee: Jon Mick Pineda

==== (2) FEU vs. (3) UST ====
FEU clinched the twice-to-beat advantage after UST's loss to UP. On the other hand, FEU's win against La Salle sealed UST's spot in the semifinals.

February 8, 2026
16:30

FEU Tamaraws	1–2	UST Growling Tigers
Selwyn Mamon 28'		Archie Belluga 53'; Kyler Escobar 78'

Rizal Memorial Stadium, Manila
Referee: John Mike Basinang
February 13, 2026
16:30

FEU Tamaraws	3–2	UST Growling Tigers
Selwyn Mamon 5'; Karl Absalon 14'; McJay Neniel 89'		Kyler Escobar 34', 90+7'

Rizal Memorial Stadium, Manila
Referee: Clifford Daypuyat

=== Finals ===
The finals is a knockout single-game elimination.

February 23, 2026
15:00

UP Fighting Maroons	2–1 (a.e.t.)	FEU Tamaraws
Lohitaña 90+9' (pen.); Bation III 104'		Absalon 45+2'

Rizal Memorial Stadium, Manila
Referee: Jon Mick Pineda

=== Statistics ===
As of February 13, 2026

==== Top goalscorers ====
Team eliminated / inactive for this round.

Rank	Player	Team	Round 1						Round 2						SF1	SF2	F	Total
Rank	Player	Team	M1	M2	M3	M4	M5	M6	M7	M8	M9	M10	M11	M12	SF1	SF2	F	Total
1	(Philippines) Selwyn Mamon	FEU Tamaraws	1				1	2	3			1	1		1	1		11
2	(Ghana) Kofi Agyei	Ateneo Blue Eagles	2		2		1		2		1	1						9
3	(Philippines) Ramil Bation III	UP Fighting Maroons	1	1				1	2					1	1		1	8
4	(Philippines) Theo Libarnes	FEU Tamaraws				1		1	1	1			1	1				6
5	(Philippines) Dov Cariño	Ateneo Blue Eagles	1	1			1	1	1									5
5	(Cameroon) Golike Doko	Adamson Soaring Falcons		1		1		1					2					5
5	(Philippines) Rodrigo Mariñas	UST Golden Booters						2	1	1		1						5
5	(Philippines) Kyler Escobar	UST Growling Tigers	1									1			1	2		5
9	(Philippines) John Gaverza	De La Salle Green Archers					1						1	2				4
9	(Philippines) Karl Absalon	FEU Tamaraws												2		1	1	4

==== Hat-tricks ====
Player	School	Result	Against	Date
(Philippines) Selwyn Mamon	FEU Tamaraws	4–1^{R2}	UE Red Warriors	26 October 2024

==== Own goals ====
Rank	Player	School	Against	Own goals
1	(Philippines) Sam Alegre	UST Golden Booters	De La Salle Green Booters^{R1}	1
1	(Philippines) Christian Tio	UE Red Warriors	UST Growling Tigers^{R2}	1
1	(Philippines) Aiden Aguirre	Ateneo Blue Eagles	UST Growling Tigers^{R2}	1

==== Top assists ====
Rank	Player	School	Assists
1	(Philippines) Dov Cariño	Ateneo Blue Eagles	7
2	(Philippines) Kofi Agyei	Ateneo Blue Eagles	3
2	(Philippines) Kent Dela Peña	UST Golden Booters	3
2	(Philippines) Jam Mariveles	UE Red Warriors	3
4	(Cameroon) Golike Doko	Adamson Soaring Falcons	2
4	(Philippines) Kyler Escobar	UST Golden Booters	2
4	(Philippines) Cian Galsim	UP Fighting Maroons	2
4	(Philippines) John Gaverza	DLSU Green Booters	2
4	(Philippines) Rustel Buenafe	FEU Tamaraws	2
4	(Philippines) Czam Acuesta	FEU Tamaraws	2
4	(Philippines) Jian Caraig	UP Fighting Maroons	2
4	(Philippines) Florenz Tacardon	UP Fighting Maroons	2
4	(Philippines) Mateo Lacson	Ateneo Blue Eagles	2

==== Clean sheets ====
Rank	Player	School	Matches
1	(Philippines) Fonzy Gonzalez	UP Fighting Maroons	7
2	(Philippines) Jet Fabrigas	FEU Tamaraws	4
3	(Philippines) Mark Daig	UST Growling Tigers	3
4	(Philippines) Edcel James Lauron	DLSU Green Booters	2
4	(Philippines) JP Tansingco	Ateneo Blue Eagles	2
4	(Philippines) Jed Lauron	Adamson Soaring Falcons	2
4	(Philippines) Mon Diansuy	FEU Tamaraws	2
8	(Philippines) Alfonso Loja	Ateneo Blue Eagles	1
8	(Philippines) Shane Salarda	Adamson Soaring Falcons	1
8	(Philippines) Chevy Celeste	UP Fighting Maroons	1
8	(Philippines) Jason Salavante	DLSU Green Booters	1

==== Player of the Match ====
Rank	Player	School	Matches	Against
1	(Philippines) Dov Cariño	Ateneo Blue Eagles	4	Adamson^{R1}, La Salle^{R1}, FEU^{R1}, Adamson^{R1}
1	(Philippines) Ramil Bation III	UP Fighting Maroons	4	FEU^{R1}, UST^{R1}, UE^{R2}, La Salle^{SF1}
3	(Philippines) Rodrigo Mariñas	UST Golden Booters	3	UE^{R1}, UST^{R2}, UE^{R2}
3	(Cameroon) Golike Doko	Adamson Soaring Falcons	3	UST^{R1}, UE^{R1}, UE^{R2}
3	(Philippines) Selwyn Mamon	FEU Tamaraws	3	La Salle^{R1}, UE^{R2}, La Salle^{R2}
3	(Philippines) John Gaverza	DLSU Green Booters	3	Adamson^{R1}, UE^{R2}, UP^{R2}
3	(Philippines) Kyler Escobar	UST Golden Booters	3	La Salle^{R1}, Ateneo^{R2}, FEU^{SF1}
8	(Philippines) Jian Caraig	UP Fighting Maroons	2	UE^{R1}, Ateneo^{R1}
8	(Philippines) Karl Absalon	FEU Tamaraws	2	Adamson^{R2}, UST^{R2}
10	(Philippines) Lucan Andan	DLSU Green Booters	1	UE^{R1}
10	(Philippines) Eldrin Madrid	UE Red Warriors	1	Ateneo^{R1}
10	(Philippines) Edgar Aban	FEU Tamaraws	1	Adamson^{R1}
10	(Philippines) Edcel James Lauron	DLSU Green Booters	1	UP^{R1}
10	(Philippines) Alfonso Loja	Ateneo Blue Eagles	1	UST^{R1}
10	(Philippines) Czam Acuesta	FEU Tamaraws	1	UST^{R1}
10	(Philippines) Jerby Anito	FEU Tamaraws	1	UE^{R1}
10	(Philippines) Adri Caraig	UP Fighting Maroons	1	Adamson^{R1}
10	(Philippines) James Sibla	DLSU Green Booters	1	UE^{R2}
10	(Philippines) Florenz Tacardon	UP Fighting Maroons	1	Ateneo^{R2}
10	(Philippines) Mateo Lacson	Ateneo Blue Eagles	1	UE^{R2}
10	(Philippines) Kim Cabuag	Adamson Soaring Falcons	1	UST^{R2}
10	(Philippines) Charles Lobitaña	Adamson Soaring Falcons	1	UST^{R2}
10	(Ghana) Kofi Agyei	Ateneo Blue Eagles	1	La Salle^{R2}
10	(Philippines) Ivan Francisco	Adamson Soaring Falcons	1	UP^{R2}
10	(Philippines) Theo Libarnes	FEU Tamaraws	1	Ateneo^{R2}
10	(Philippines) Shan Lorque	UP Fighting Maroons	1	UST^{R2}
10	(Philippines) Mel Baylon	FEU Tamaraws	1	UST^{SF2}

Note

^{R1} Round 1
^{R2} Round 2
^{SF1} Semifinals 1
^{SF2} Semifinals 2
^{F} Finals

==== Awards ====
UAAP Season 88 men's football champions
UP Fighting Maroons
20th title

- Most Valuable Players: Charles Lobitaña (UP Fighting Maroons) and Florenz Tacardon (UP Fighting Maroons)
- Rookie of the Year: Kian Niu (FEU Tamaraws)
- Golden Boot: Selwyn Mamon (FEU Tamaraws)
- Best Striker: Selwyn Mamon (FEU Tamaraws)
- Best Midfielder: Dov Cariño (Ateneo Blue Eagles)
- Best Defender: Charles Lobitaña (UP Fighting Maroons)
- Best Goalkeeper: Fonzy Gonzalez (UP Fighting Maroons)
- Fair Play Award: UP Fighting Maroons

== Women's tournament ==
=== Elimination round ===
==== Team standings ====
Pos	Team	Pld	W	D	L	GF	GA	GD	Pts	Qualification
1	FEU Lady Tamaraws	8	8	0	0	23	3	+20	24	Qualification for the Final
2	De La Salle Lady Booters	8	4	0	4	10	8	+2	12	Qualification for the Final
3	Ateneo Blue Eagles	8	3	2	3	6	11	−5	11	
4	UST Lady Booters	8	2	3	3	7	9	−2	9	
5	UP Fighting Maroons (H)	8	0	1	7	3	18	−15	1	

Updated to match(es) played on November 5, 2025. Source: The UAAP
(H) Hosts

==== Match-up results ====
	Round 1				Round 2			
Team ╲ Game	1	2	3	4	5	6	7	8
Ateneo Blue Eagles	La Salle school colors	FEU school colors	UP school colors	UST school colors	UST school colors	UP school colors	La Salle school colors	FEU school colors
De La Salle Lady Booters	Ateneo school colors	UST school colors	UP school colors	FEU school colors	UP school colors	Ateneo school colors	FEU school colors	UST school colors
FEU Lady Tamaraws	UP school colors	Ateneo school colors	UST school colors	La Salle school colors	UST school colors	UP school colors	La Salle school colors	Ateneo school colors
UP Fighting Maroons	UST school colors	FEU school colors	La Salle school colors	Ateneo school colors	La Salle school colors	Ateneo school colors	FEU school colors	UST school colors
UST Lady Booters	UP school colors	La Salle school colors	FEU school colors	Ateneo school colors	Ateneo school colors	FEU school colors	UP school colors	La Salle school colors

Updated to match(es) played on November 5, 2025. Source: The UAAP
= Win; = Draw; = Loss

==== Results ====
School	ATENEO	DLSU	FEU	UP	UST
Ateneo Blue Eagles		0–1	1–5	1–0	1–1
De La Salle Lady Booters	0–1		1–2	2–0	2–1
FEU Lady Tamaraws	4–1	2–1		4–0	1–0
UP Fighting Maroons	1–2	2–4	0–4		0–1
UST Lady Booters	3–3	1–0	0–2	0–0	

Updated to match(es) played on November 5, 2025. Source: The UAAP
Legend: Blue = left column team win; Yellow = draw; Red = top row team win.

=== Final ===
November 15, 2025
17:00

FEU Lady Tamaraws	2–0	De La Salle Lady Booters
Judie Arevalo 15'; Regine Rebosura 90+3'

UP Diliman Football Stadium, Quezon City

=== Statistics ===
As of 25 October 2025

==== Top goalscorers ====
Team eliminated / inactive for this round.

Rank	Player	Team	Round 1				Round 2				F	Total
Rank	Player	Team	M1	M2	M3	M4	M5	M6	M7	M8	F	Total
1	(Philippines) Judie Arevalo	FEU Lady Tamaraws	1	2	1		1	1			1	7
2	(Philippines) Jada Bicierro	Ateneo Blue Eagles		1	1	1	2	1				6
2	(Philippines) Regine Rebosura	FEU Lady Tamaraws	1	2			1	1			1	6
4	(Philippines) Dani Tanjangco	De La Salle Lady Booters		1	1		1					3
4	(Philippines) Marienell Cristobal	FEU Lady Tamaraws	1			1		1				3
6	(Philippines) Christy Logastua	UST Lady Booters				1	1					2
6	(Philippines) Erisa Rivas	UP Fighting Maroons					1	1				2
6	(Philippines) Celina Salazar	Ateneo Blue Eagles					1		1			2

==== Own goals ====
Rank	Player	School	Against	Own goals
1	(Philippines) Gabby Calope	UP Fighting Maroons	De La Salle Lady Booters^{R1}	1

==== Top assists ====
Rank	Player	School	Assists
1	(Philippines) Jodie Banzon	De La Salle Lady Booters	2
1	(Philippines) Marienell Cristobal	FEU Lady Tamaraws	2
1	(Philippines) Celina Salazar	Ateneo Blue Eagles	2
1	(Philippines) Regine Rebosura	FEU Lady Tamaraws	2
5	19 players		1

==== Clean sheets ====
Rank	Player	School	Matches
1	(Philippines) Jessa Lehayan	FEU Lady Tamaraws	2
1	(Philippines) Chelssy Casals	Ateneo Blue Eagles	2
3	(Philippines) Jessica Pido	De La Salle Lady Booters	1
3	(Philippines) Liezlie Garcia	UST Lady Booters	1
3	(Philippines) Gretl Tan	De La Salle Lady Booters	1
3	(Philippines) Paula Artillo	FEU Lady Tamaraws	1

==== Multiple Player of the Match ====
Rank	Player	School	Matches	Against
1	(Philippines) Regine Rebosura	FEU Lady Tamaraws	4	UP^{R1}, Ateneo^{R1}, La Salle^{R1}, UST^{R2}
2	(Philippines) Jada Bicierro	Ateneo Blue Eagles	3	UP^{R1}, UST^{R1}, UST^{R2}
3	(Philippines) Elisha Lubiano	De La Salle Lady Booters	1	Ateneo^{R1}
3	(Philippines) Rica Gerona	UST Lady Booters	1	UP^{R1}
3	(Philippines) Jodie Banzon	De La Salle Lady Booters	1	UST^{R1}
3	(Philippines) Dani Tanjangco	De La Salle Lady Booters	1	UP^{R1}
3	(Philippines) Judie Arevalo	FEU Lady Tamaraws	1	UST^{R1}
3	(Philippines) Maegan Alforque	De La Salle Lady Booters	1	UP^{R2}
3	(Philippines) Angely Alferez	Ateneo Blue Eagles	1	UP^{R2}
3	(Philippines) Celina Salazar	Ateneo Blue Eagles	1	La Salle^{R2}
3	(Philippines) Sara Tulabing	FEU Lady Tamaraws	1	UP^{R2}

Note

^{R1} Round 1
^{R2} Round 2

=== Awards ===
UAAP Season 88 women's football champions
FEU Lady Tamaraws
14th title, fourth consecutive title

- Most Valuable Player: Jonela Albiño (FEU Lady Tamaraws)
- Rookie of the Year: Jodie Banzon (DLSU Lady Booters)
- Golden Boot: Judie Arevalo (FEU Lady Tamaraws)
- Best Striker: Jada Bicierro (Ateneo Blue Eagles)
- Best Midfielder: Regine Rebosura (FEU Lady Tamaraws)
- Best Defender: Elisha Lubiano (DLSU Lady Booters)
- Best Goalkeeper: Jessa May Lehayan (FEU Tamaraws)
- Fair Play Award: Ateneo Blue Eagles

== Boys' tournament ==
=== Elimination round ===
==== Team standings ====
Pos	Team	Pld	W	D	L	GF	GA	GD	Pts	Qualification
1	FEU–D Baby Tamaraws	12	10	1	1	30	0	+30	31	Qualification for semifinals
2	UST Junior Golden Booters	12	9	1	2	13	0	+13	28	Qualification for semifinals
3	DLSZ Junior Green Booters	12	6	2	4	5	0	+5	20	Qualification for semifinals
4	Southridge Admirals (G)	12	5	2	5	2	0	+2	17	Qualification for semifinals
5	Ateneo Blue Eagles	12	5	1	6	0	5	−5	16	
6	Adamson Baby Falcons	12	1	3	8	0	15	−15	6	
7	Claret Red Roosters (G)	12	1	0	11	0	30	−30	3	

Updated to match(es) played on January 17, 2026. Source:
(G) Guests

==== Match-up results ====
	Round 1						Round 2					
Team ╲ Game	1	2	3	4	5	6	7	8	9	10	11	12
Adamson Baby Falcons	FEU school colors	PAREF school colors	Claret school colors	UST school colors	La Salle school colors	Ateneo school colors	La Salle school colors	Ateneo school colors	Claret school colors	UST school colors	PAREF school colors	FEU school colors
Ateneo Blue Eagles	PAREF school colors	Claret school colors	UST school colors	La Salle school colors	Adamson school colors	FEU school colors	PAREF school colors	Adamson school colors	FEU school colors	La Salle school colors	Claret school colors	UST school colors
Claret Red Roosters	La Salle school colors	Ateneo school colors	Adamson school colors	FEU school colors	PAREF school colors	UST school colors	UST school colors	PAREF school colors	Adamson school colors	FEU school colors	La Salle school colors	Ateneo school colors
DLSZ Junior Green Booters	Claret school colors	UST school colors	Ateneo school colors	Adamson school colors	FEU school colors	PAREF school colors	Adamson school colors	FEU school colors	Ateneo school colors	Claret school colors	UST school colors	PAREF school colors
FEU–D Baby Tamaraws	Adamson school colors	PAREF school colors	Claret school colors	UST school colors	La Salle school colors	Ateneo school colors	La Salle school colors	Ateneo school colors	Claret school colors	UST school colors	PAREF school colors	Adamson school colors
Southridge Admirals	Ateneo school colors	Adamson school colors	FEU school colors	Claret school colors	UST school colors	La Salle school colors	Ateneo school colors	Claret school colors	UST school colors	Adamson school colors	FEU school colors	La Salle school colors
UST Junior Golden Booters	La Salle school colors	Ateneo school colors	Adamson school colors	FEU school colors	PAREF school colors	Claret school colors	Claret school colors	PAREF school colors	Adamson school colors	FEU school colors	La Salle school colors	Ateneo school colors

Updated to match(es) played on January 17, 2026. Source:
= Win; = Draw; = Loss

==== Results ====
Teams	AdU	ATENEO	CSQC	DLSZ	FEU–D	SRG	UST
Adamson Baby Falcons		1–1	2–3	0–1	5–0	3–3	2–2
Ateneo Blue Eagles	4–1		4–0	0–1	0–5	1–0	0–3
Claret Red Roosters	1–4	0–2		6–1	0–2	0–2	1–5
DLSZ Junior Green Booters	3–1	1–2	3–2		0–2	1–1	0–1
FEU–D Baby Tamaraws	5–1	5–0	1–4	1–1		2–0	1–2
Southridge Admirals	2–1	0–1	2–0	3–1	2–3		1–0
UST Junior Golden Booters	1–2	2–1	3–0	2–1	1–3	1–0	

Updated to match(es) played on January 17, 2026. Source:
Legend: Blue = left column team win; Yellow = draw; Red = top row team win.

==== Playoffs ====
Semifinals (Knockout)
Mar 28
1	FEU	1
4	Southridge	0
Mar 28
2	UST	2
3	La Salle	1

Finals (Knockout)
April 10
1	FEU	2
2	UST	1

== See also ==
- UAAP Season 88
