= Philippine Underwater Hockey Confederation =

National sports association

- Sport: Underwater hockey
- Abbreviation: PUHC
- Founded: 1991
- Headquarters: Forbes Park, Makati
- (Philippines)

The Philippine Underwater Hockey Confederation (PUHC) is the national sports association for Underwater hockey and the first Underwater hockey club in Asia, represented by 3 underwater hockey clubs across the country namely, Polo Puck Pirates Underwater Hockey Club, Underwater Hockey Bootcamp and Citadel Underwater Hockey Club. The PUHC also organizing national tournaments.

The PUHC is being affiliated with the World Underwater Federation (CMAS), the Philippine Olympic Committee (POC), and the Philippine Sports Commission (PSC).

Underwater hockey in the Philippines started in 1979, when a president of a dive club based in Manila, read an article on underwater hockey in the official magazine in CMAS. After inquiring on the game rules and regulations, the first underwater hockey game was played in 1980 in the shop's swimming pool. The dive club of the University of the Philippines (known as UP divers) reached the sport after securing a regular venue for the scrimmages and practices, despite the crude equipment. They first played at the Quezon City Sports Club pool from 1984 to 1997. In 1990, the players formed the PUHC and registered by the Securities and Exchange Commission in 1991. Years gone by, PUHC's membership was gradually increased.

== National teams ==
The PUHC created and maintains the national underwater hockey team that will represent the country in international competitions including Underwater Hockey World Championships and the Asian Underwater Hockey Championships. The team dominated the Asian championships, finishing gold-medal records in the inaugural staging in 2007, followed by gold finishes in 2008 and 2009 and silver medals in 2011 and 2013. In 2015, the Philippines won 4 gold medals in women's, 4 gold medals in men's and 5 gold medals in mixed division.

The team also swept second place in the 1997 Pacific Coast tournament held in Hawaii.

Sports outfitter Speedo sponsored the national teams's uniforms.

In 2016, the PUHC sent a 10-man men's and 9-man women's national underwater hockey teams in the Underwater Hockey World Championships 2016 held in South Africa on March 22–April 2, 2016.
