= Underwater photography (sport) =

Competitive underwater digital photography on scuba

Underwater Photography
- Highest governing body: CMAS
- First played: before 1985

Characteristics
- Contact: No
- Team members: yes
- Mixed-sex: yes
- Type: Aquatic
- Equipment: diving mask, fins, open circuit scuba set, digital underwater camera system
- Venue: ocean

Underwater photography is a scuba-based underwater sport governed by Confédération Mondiale des Activités Subaquatiques (CMAS) where teams of competitors using digital underwater camera systems all dive at the same saltwater ocean sites at the same time over a two-day period. The submitted digital images are then assessed and ranked by a jury using a maximum of five photographic categories as well as an overall score. The sport was developed prior to 1985 as a photographic film-based event and is currently mainly practised in non-English speaking countries.

== Competitor admission requirements ==
At international level, competition is open to teams from all CMAS national federations regardless of affiliation status. Each federation can sent one team consisting of a captain and four divers - two being the photographers and the other two being the photographers' assistants. Each diver must be at least 16 years old at the time of competition, have a minimum diver certification of CMAS 2 star diver and be in 'good health'.

== General principles of the competition ==
As of July 2013, the International Rules contained the following general principles.

The competition will be hosted by a diving federation affiliated to CMAS.

All competitors are to dive at the same site or similar sites at the same time on the same day.

The camera systems to be used are restricted to digital cameras without any means of wireless distribution of data such as WLAN or Bluetooth. While competitors can have multiple cameras, only one memory card is permitted per competitor and only one camera can be used in the water at a time.

Protection of the environment is a fundamental requirement where competitors will be subject to disqualification if found to have touched or moved living animals, caused deterioration to or have polluted the marine environment, used dead animals to compose scenes or used a diver propulsion vehicle.

The safety of the competitors and officials is also a fundamental requirement. Further to the admission requirements, each diver will be required to be equipped with a BCD, an alternative air source such as an auxiliary demand valve or pony bottle and a surface marking system as well as their diving regulator must be fitted with a submersible pressure gauge. All dives are to be conducted in accordance with CMAS rules. The host shall provide details of local emergency services and protocols and a suitably staffed high speed boat fitted with radio and emergency first aid equipment including oxygen administration equipment for the purpose of rendering first aid to any injured diver and organise the attendance of a medical practitioner qualified in diving medicine at each day of diving. Also, each boat provided for the competition teams will be supplied with an oxygen administration kit and a spare diving cylinder intended only for emergency use.

The host will be responsible for developing a document called the Specific Rules which schedules all of the information pertinent to the competition such as the overall program, participation costs, accommodation, transport, local diving conditions, point of contact, the memory card formats to be used and the photographic categories to be submitted for judging. A maximum of five photographic categories are to be selected from following five categories - fish, close-up with a theme, close-up (without a theme), wide angle (without diver) and wide angle with diver.

A jury of seven persons will review the submitted images and establish the placing of all competitors via voting system in a similar manner as for sports such as gymnastics or springboard diving. The jury members will be persons acknowledged as being 'qualified' and 'recognised' in digital underwater photography and who undertake to remain anonymous until the completion of the judging process.

== Organisation and conduct of the competition ==
As July 2013, the international rules describe how the competition will be organised and conducted. The host will select a region with a range of suitable open-water diving sites including alternative sites in case of a contingency such as rough weather. The host will also organise the accommodation and boats for the teams and officials, and supplies of breathing gas (usually air) in diving cylinders with a capacity of usually 12 litres at the rate of one per dive. The use of rebreathers is permitted only if made available to all competitors.

Boats provided for the teams are to be sized to be three-quarters full when the full complement of the team and boat operator(s) is aboard.

The competition is held over a minimum of four days where the first day is for practice, days two and three are for competition and the last day is for the judging of the submitted images. A minimum of four dives involving all teams are conducted at four separate sites with a maximum duration of 90 minutes per dive including all applicable decompression requirements.

The process of inserting the memory card into the camera and the closing of the camera's underwater housing (if not amphibious camera) before diving is witnessed by the competition's organisers as is the opening of the housing and removal of the memory card at the end of each day of competition. The memory card is then given to the competition's organisers who download the first 100 images. The card is then returned to the competitor who selects and advises which images they desire to be judged.

During the last day of the competition, the jury will review all submitted images to rank these within the photographic categories described in the Specific Rules. An individual classification will also be compiled by allotting scores to the top ten images in each photographic category using a fibonacci sequence. The names of top ten competitors in the photographic categories and in the individual classification will be publicly announced. The highest scoring competitor will be announced as the CMAS World Champion and receive the gold medal while the second and third placed competitors will respectively receive the silver and bronze medals.

== Governing body ==
The international governing body is the Visual Commission of the CMAS Sport Committee. As of July 2013, national federations in the following countries and territories have affiliated with the commission - Andorra, Austria, Belgium, Brazil, China, Cuba, Croatia, Cyprus, Czech Republic, Denmark, Egypt, France, Germany, Hong Kong, Hungary, Italy, Japan, Luxembourg, Mauritius, Mexico, Montenegro, Morocco, Norway, Portugal, Russia, Slovenia, South Korea, Spain, Sweden, Thailand, the Netherlands, Turkey and Ukraine.

== Origins and history ==
The sport was developed prior to 1985 as a photographic film-based event and reportedly transferred to the use of digital media in 2008. It is currently mainly practiced in non-English speaking countries. It is known as Photo Sub in French and as Fotosub in Spanish. The sport has two variants with the first being a championship conducted at ocean sites as described above and the second being a creative event conducted in a swimming pool. As of July 2013, no international rules are publicly available for the swimming pool based event.

== Championships ==
Competition at international level has been offered since 1985. As of July 2013, this includes 14 world championships, a world cup held at Hurghada, Egypt during 1995 and two swimming pool based world championships held in Paris, France during 1997 and Copenhagen, Denmark during 2001. The sport is also conducted at the national level in countries such as Brazil, Cuba, Mexico, Spain and Venezuela. As of July 2015, the 16th CMAS Underwater Photography World Championship will be held from 22 to 27 November 2017 in Acapulco, Mexico.

== See also ==
- 14th CMAS Underwater Photography World Championship – 2013 photography competition held in Cuba
- Orhan Aytür – Turkish professor of optoelectronics and underwater photographer
- Underwater Photography World Championships – International event for the sport of underwater photography
