= 14th CMAS Underwater Photography World Championship =

2013 photography competition held in Cuba

- Venue: Cayo Largo
- Location: Cuba
- Start date: April 9, 2013
- End date: April 14, 2013
- Competitors: 78 from 18 nations

The 14th CMAS Underwater Photography World Championship was held from April 9 – 14, 2013 in Cuba at Cayo Largo. David Barrio of Spain was announced as the CMAS World Champion in underwater photography for 2013 and received the gold medal while runners-up Stefano Proakis and Michele Davino both representing Italy respectively received the silver and bronze medals.

== Organisation ==
The Federacion Cubana de Actividades Subacuaticuas (English: Cuban Federation of Underwater Activities) (FCAS) hosted the championship on behalf of the Confédération Mondiale des Activités Subaquatiques (CMAS) with assistance from the Ministry of Tourism of Cuba (MINTUR). The following countries sent teams with a total of 78 competitors to compete - Argentina, Belgium, Brazil, Cuba, Croatia, Denmark, France, Germany, Italy, Mexico, Norway, Portugal, Spain, Slovenia, South Korea, Sweden, the Netherlands and Turkey.

The following photographic categories were used for this championship: fish, close-up with a theme, close-up (without a theme), wide angle (without diver) and wide angle with diver.

== Results ==
=== Top ten competitors ===
Place	Name	Country
1	David Barrio	Spain
2	Stefano Proakis	Italy
3	Michele Davino	Italy
4	Daniel G Pérez Hernández	Cuba
5	Manuel José Pererira de Silva	Portugal
6	Esteban Torre	Spain
7	Vidar Skalevik	Norway
8	Marco Heesbeen	Netherlands
9	Joao Paulo Cauduro Filho	Brazil
10	Julien Carpels	France

=== Top ten fish ===
Place	Name	Country
1	Michele Davino	Italy
2	David Barrio	Spain
3	Manuel José Pererira de Silva	Portugal
4	Dalibor Andres	Croatia
5	Julien Carpels	France
6	Esteban Torre	Spain
7	Erik Larsson	Denmark
8	Ludwing Migl	Germany
9	Oskar Mark Music	Slovenia
10	Daniel G Pérez Hernández	Cuba

=== Top ten close-up with a theme ===
Place	Name	Country
1	David Barrio	Spain
2	Stefano Proakis	Italy
3	Manuel José Pererira de Silva	Portugal
4	Julien Carpels	France
5	Joao Paulo Cauduro Filho	Brazil
6	Sandon Stephane	France
7	Ludwing Migl	Germany
8	Esteban Torre	Spain
9	Vidar Skalevik	Norway
10	Henny Blookvort	Netherlands

=== Top ten close-up ===
Place	Name	Country
1	Daniel G Pérez Hernández	Cuba
2	Michele Davino	Italy
3	Oskar Mark Music	Slovenia
4	Vidar Skalevik	Norway
5	Tobias Dahlin	Sweden
6	Oscar Rulli	Argentina
7	Esteban Torre	Spain
8	Cem Gazivekili	Turkey
9	David Barrio	Spain
10	Sandon Stephane	France

=== Top ten wide angle ===
Place	Name	Country
1	David Barrio	Spain
2	Marco Heesbeen	Netherlands
3	Stefano Proakis	Italy
4	Vidar Skalevik	Norway
5	Oh Yong Sung	South Korea
6	Henny Blookvort	(Netherlands) Netherland
7	Ludwing Migl	Germany
8	Sandon Stephane	France
9	Danijel Frka	Croatia
10	Luis Pérez Suárez	Argentina

=== Top ten wide angle with diver ===
Place	Name	Country
1	Stefano Proakis	Italy
2	Esteban Torre	Spain
3	Joao Paulo Cauduro Filho	Brazil
4	Sang Hanck Choi	South Korea
5	Vidar Skalevik	Norway
6	Danijel Frka	Croatia
7	Manuel José Pererira de Silva	Portugal
8	Julien Carpels	France
9	David Barrio	Spain
10	Sandon Stephane	France
