= Underwater hockey in Turkey =

Underwater hockey in Turkey is governed by the Turkish Underwater Sports Federation (Turkish: Türkiye Sualtı Sporları Federasyonu, TSSF). The TSSF organizes annual Turkey Cups for masters, under-24, and under-19 men's and women's clubs. National teams of men and women masters, U24 and U19 take part at international competitions.

== Clubs ==
The following clubs were active in 2016:

Women's

Başkent (Ankara), Bilimsel Yüzme (Istanbul), Denizatı (Istanbul), Deniz Yıldızları (Kocaeli), Marmara (Istanbul), Olimpiyat (Kocaeli), Orka (Istanbul), Su ve Doğa (Istanbul), Hacettepe(Ankara).

Men's

Baracuda (Kocaeli), Başkent (Ankara), Bilimsel Yüzme (Istanbul), Denizatı (Istanbul), Deniz Yıldızları (Kocaeli), Dumlupınar (Kütahya), Istanbul Sualtı (Istanbul), İzmit Sualtı (Kocaeli), Kocaeli Gençlik (Kocaeli), Kocaeli Yarımca (Kocaeli), ODTÜ (Ankara), Olimpik (Istanbul), Hacettepe(Ankara).

== Domestic Competitions ==
The underwater hockey sport began in Turkey with the first championship held in October 1999 in Çankırı.

At the Federation Cup in 2018 held in Çanakkale, eight women's teams and 16 men's teams participated. At the 2019 Federation Cup in Çanakkale, 13 women's and 19 men's teams from 21 clubs took part. At the 2020 Federation Cup, ten women's and 17 men's teams from 17 clubs competed in Istanbul.

At the Turkish U19 Championship in 2019 held at Kütahya, ten women's teams and 21 men's teams participated.

== National team ==
Turkey's first international appearance took place at the Underwater Hockey World Championships held in Hobart, Australia, with a national team formed following the 2000 Turkish Championship. The first achievements of the women's and men's national teams came as runners-up at the 2007 Underwater Games World Championship held in Bari, Italy. At the same competition, a Turkish referee took part for the first time.

=== Men's ===
The Turkey men's national underwater hockey team was the runner-up at the 2007 World Underwater Hockey Games in Italy. The team placed 8th at the Elite Underwater Hockey World Championships conducted by the Confédération Mondiale des Activités Subaquatiques (CMAS) in 2011 at Coimbra, Portugal, and ranked 5th in 2013 World Championships at Eger, Hungary. They won the silver medal at the 2016 World Championships at Stellenbosch, South Africa, and in 2018 took the bronze medal at the 20th Underwater Hockey World Championship in Quebec, Canada, winning the European Championship in Istanbul, Turkey, the same year. The national team won the 2017 CMAS Underwater Hockey European Championship held in Eger, Hungary, after defeating the United Kingdom team 5–3 in the final. The national team repeated their victory at the European Championship in 2019 held in Spain, defeating France in the final by 3–1. It was their second consecutive European championship title.

=== Women's U23 ===
The women's national under-23 team's achievements include fourth place at the 18th CMAS Elite Underwater Hockey World Championships in 2013 at Eger, Hungary, and sixth rank at the 3rd World Age Group Underwater Hockey Championships in 2015 at Castellón de la Plana, Spain.

=== Men's U23/U24 ===
The men's national under-23 team won the championship at the World Age Group Underwater Hockey Championships in 2015 at Castellón de la Plana, Spain, and in 2017 at Hobart, Australia. The men's national under-24 team won the 5th World Age Group CMAS Underwater Hockey Championship in 2019 at Sheffield, England, for the third consecutive time, becoming the only national team to win the title three times in a row.
