= Orhan Aytür =

Turkish professor of optoelectronics and underwater photographer (born 1965)

- Born: 1965 (age 60–61); Ankara, Turkey
- Education: Middle East Technical University; Northwestern University
- Occupation: University professor

Orhan Aytür (born 1965) is a Turkish professor of optoelectronics and world champion amateur underwater photographer.

== Academic career ==
Aytür was born in Ankara. He completed his secondary education at Tarsus American College and TED Ankara College Foundation Private High School, and graduated in 1986 from Middle East Technical University (ODTÜ) with a Bachelor of Science degree in electrical engineering. He went then to the United States to earn his Master's degree in 1988 and Ph.D. degree in 1991 from Northwestern University.

Aytür worked briefly as a Laser scientist in the industry and later as a research associate at University of New Mexico before he returned home in 1993. He entered Bilkent University in Ankara, and became professor in the Department of Electrical and Electronic Engineering in 2002 after his assistant professor (1993-1997) and associate professor (1997-2002) years.

His research interests are in optoelectronics and Laser. Since 2010, Aytür fulfills administrative duties as vice rector of Bilkent University.

== Underwater photography ==
Aytür's interest in underwater diving existed already in his childhood. However, due to his high myopia and the lack of diving masks with lens in that time, he was unable to see clearly underwater, and therefore stayed away from underwater diving. In 1998, with the initiative of a friend, he began with scuba diving as diving masks with lens became available.

In 1979 during his secondary school time at Tarsus American College, he began with amateur photography in black-and-white with a Russian camera, a present from his parents. He began visiting AFSAD, the Association of Photograph Artists in Ankara, in 1978, taking part in darkroom work. He took lessons in photography from architect Jale Erzen in 1984, and his first photos were published in the periodical Boyut. Aytür took his first underwater photographs in 1999 with an underwater housing lent by a friend for his camera. In 2000, he decided to combine his long–term hobby of photography with underwater diving, and purchased an underwater camera. He soon began entering photography competitions, and was surprised by his success. At his first competition in the 2000 Turkish championships, he won two titles and a second place. He continued his success in later years.

Aytür joined the national team formed by the Turkish Underwater Sports Federation (TSSF) in 2005, and represented his country at the 10th World Underwater Photography Championship in L'Estartit, Spain, organized by the Confédération Mondiale des Activités Subaquatiques (CMAS). He participates since then at international underwater photography events. He took part at the 11th CMAS Underwater Photography World Championship held on 9–14 May 2007 in Mauritius, winning the bronze medal in the Macro category. In 2007 he also took the first prize of Jorge de Albuquerque Award in the category (Conchology) at the 34th Antibes Underwater Photography Festival in France. Selected to the Turkey national team again in 2008, he participated at the 12th CMAS Underwater Photography World Championship held between 31 May and 5 June 2009 in Jeju Island in South Korea.

At the 13th CMAS Underwater Photography World Championship held on 26–31 May 2011 in Bodrum, Turkey, he became world champion among the competitors from 23 nations winning one gold medal in the category (Wide Angle with Model) and two bronze medals (Fish) and (Close up with Theme). He was named The World's Best Underwater Photographer.
