= Ayala Vermosa Sports Hub =

Sports facility in Cavite, Philippines

- Interactive map of Ayala Vermosa Sports Hub
- Full name: Ayala Vermosa Sports Hub
- Location: Imus, Cavite, Philippines
- Coordinates: 14°22′46.4″N 120°57′39.6″E
- Owner: Ayala Land
- Main venue: Athletics Center; Capacity: 1,200
- Facilities: Aquatics Center; Athlete's House
- Acreage: 8 ha (20 acres)

Construction
- Opened: 2018
- Renovated: 2024–2025

Tenant
- Philippines national athletics team (2018–)

Website
- vermosa.ph

The Ayala Vermosa Sports Hub (AVSH) is a sports facility situated in the city of Imus in Cavite, Philippines.

== History ==
The facility was opened to the public in March 2018. Prior to its opening, member of the Philippine national track and field team is already using the facility in preparation for the 2018 Asian Games.

On November 6, 2018, the football field of the sports complex hosted an unofficial friendly between the Philippine and Mongolia national football teams which ended in a 3–1 win for the hosts. The sports complex's swimming pool hosted the underwater hockey competitions of the 2019 Southeast Asian Games.

In July 2024, the Athlete's House was inaugurated within the sports hub. It is a facility for athetes' accommodation. This was followed by the construction dugout facility and the renovation of the grandstand. In September 2025, the Vermosa Sports Hub hosted the kickoff game of the UAAP Season 88 women's football tournament.

== Facilities ==
The 8-hectare (20-acre) Ayala Vermosa Sports Hub features the Athletics Center and the Aquatics Center. It also has the Recreation Center. The sports complex is part of the larger 752-hectare (1,860-acre) Vermosa Estate of Ayala Land. It also has Santé Fitness Lab, a fitness center and sports science lab; and the 30-room Athlete's House and Lounge.

=== Athletics Center ===
The Athletics Center has the first 400 m (1,300 ft) nine lane athletics oval in the Philippines. It is also the only oval certified by the International Association of Athletics Federations (IAAF) in the country. The sports hub also has a football field which has a grandstand that can accommodate 1,200 spectators.

=== Aquatics Center ===
The Aquatics Center host a 50 m (160 ft) swimming pool that has FINA certification. It also has a warmup pool.
