= Underwater hockey =

Underwater sport of pushing a puck into the opposing goal

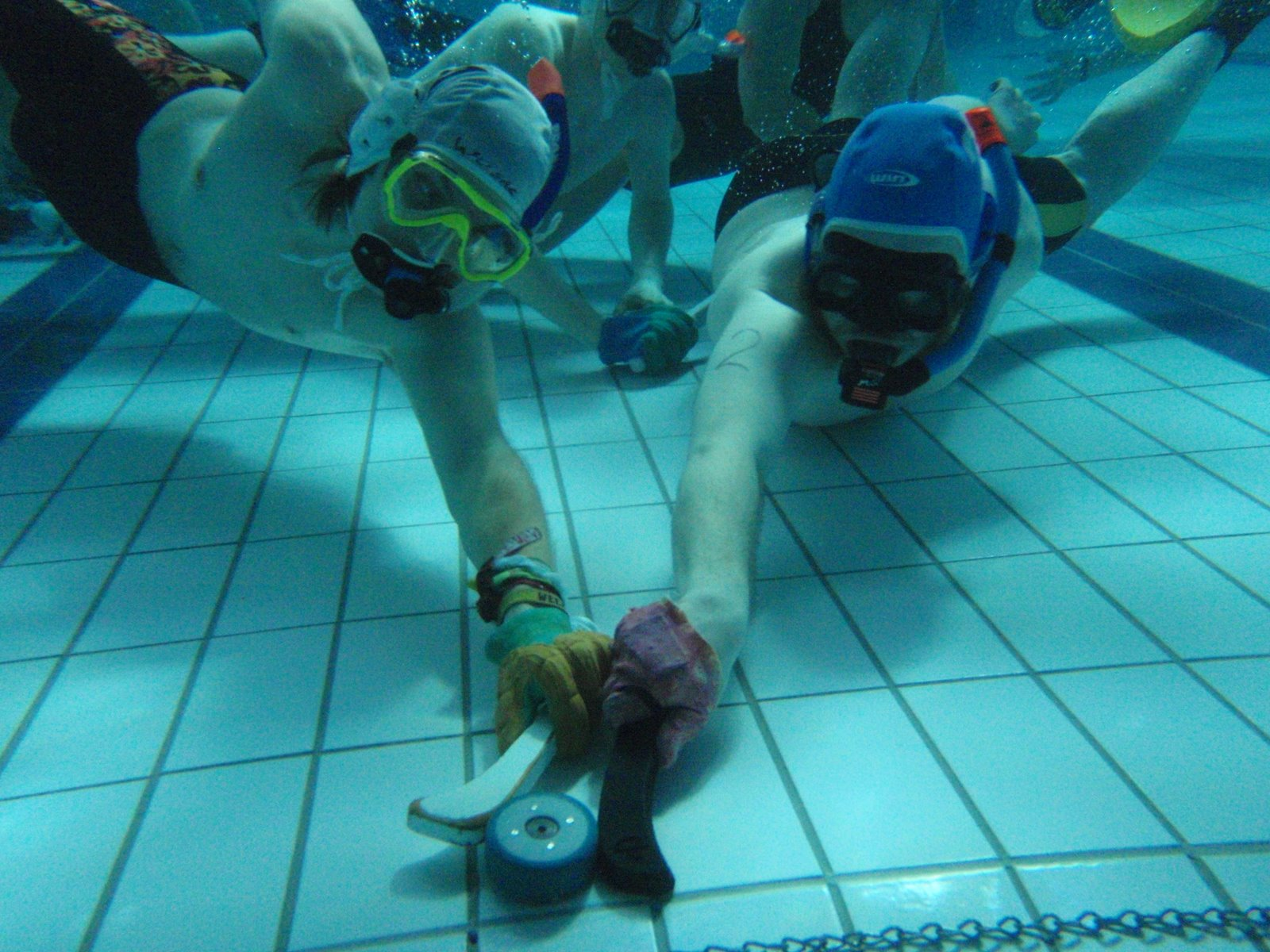
- Two players competing for the puck at the British Student Nationals in Bangor, 2009.
- Highest governing body: CMAS
- Nicknames: UWH, Octopush
- First played: 18 November 1954; 71 years ago Southsea, Portsmouth, Hampshire, England

Characteristics
- Contact: Limited
- Team members: up to 10 (6 in play)
- Mixed-sex: Yes
- Type: Aquatic
- Equipment: Diving mask; snorkel; swimfins; water polo cap; stick or pusher; protective glove; exterior mouth guard; underwater puck
- Venue: Swimming pool

Presence
- Olympic: No
- Paralympic: No
- World Games: Yes

Underwater hockey (UWH), also known as Octopush in the United Kingdom, is a limited-contact sport in which two teams compete to manoeuvre a puck across the bottom of a swimming pool into the opposing team's goal by propelling it with a hockey stick (or pusher).

A key challenge of the game is that breathing devices such as scuba gear cannot be used during play. Participants must hold their breath when completely submerged. The game originated in Portsmouth, England in 1954 when Alan Blake, a founder of the newly formed Southsea Sub-Aqua Club, invented the game he called Octopush as a means of keeping the club's members interested and active over the cold winter months when open-water diving lost its appeal. Underwater hockey is now played worldwide, with the Confédération Mondiale des Activités Subaquatiques, abbreviated CMAS, as the world governing body. The first Underwater Hockey World Championship was held in Canada in 1980.

== History ==
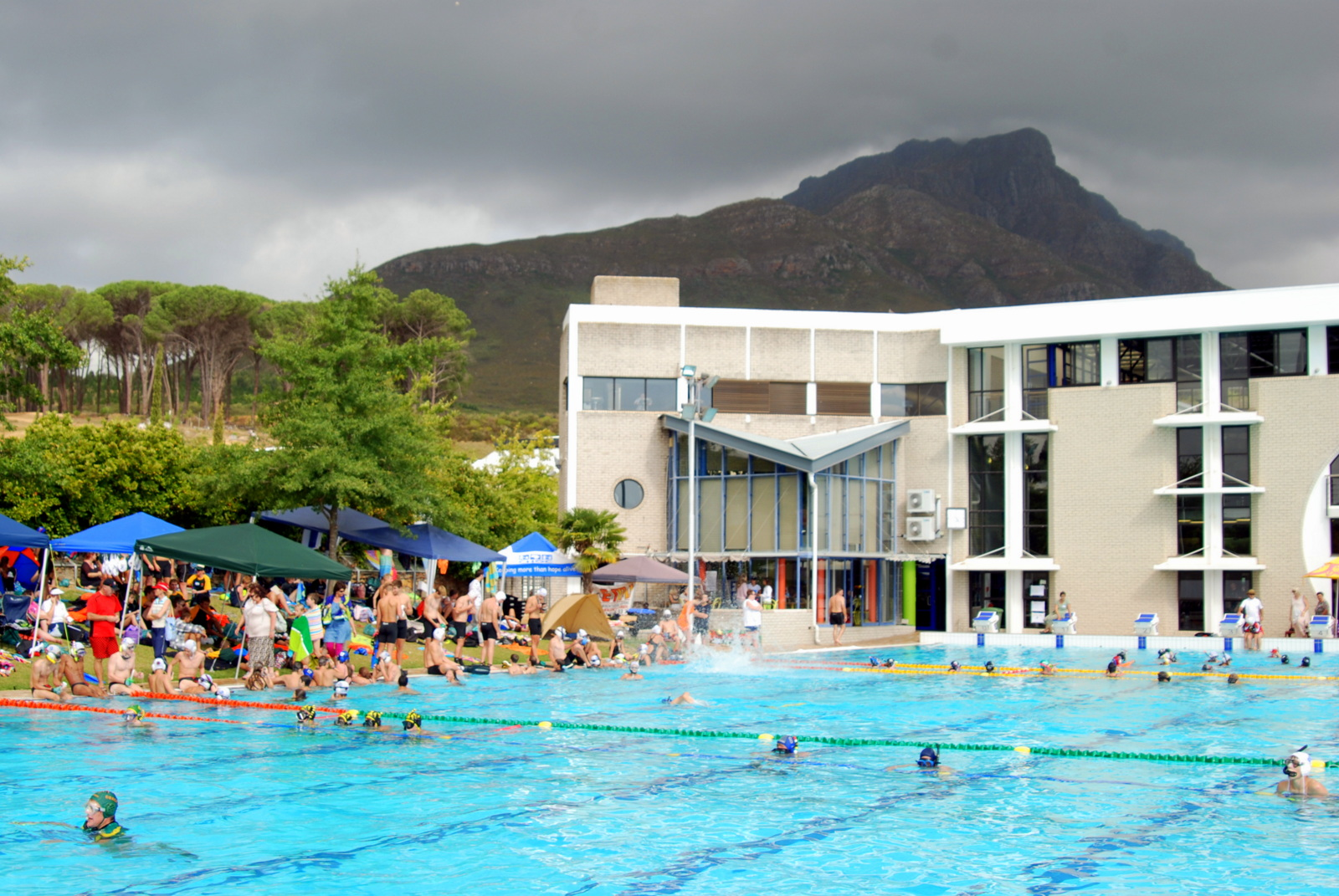
A 2014 underwater hockey tournament in Coetsenburg, South Africa

Originally called "Octopush" (and still known locally by that name in the United Kingdom), the original rules called for teams of eight players (hence "octo-"), a bat reminiscent of a tiny shuffleboard stick called a "pusher" (hence "-push"), an uncoated lead puck called a "squid", and a goal known at first as a "cuttle" but soon thereafter a "gulley". Apart from 'pusher' and to a lesser extent 'Octopush' much of this original terminology is now consigned to history.

Underwater hockey was started in the United Kingdom by Alan Blake in 1954. Blake was a founder-member of the newly formed Southsea Sub-Aqua Club (British Sub-Aqua Club No.9), he and other divers including John Ventham, Jack Willis, and Frank Lilleker first played this game in the Guildhall Baths in Portsmouth, United Kingdom.

The first rules were tested in a 1954 two-on-two game and Alan Blake made the following announcement in the November 1954 issue of the British Sub-Aqua Club's then-official magazine Neptune: "Our indoor training programme is getting under way, including wet activities other than in baths, and our new underwater game "Octopush". Of which more later when we have worked out the details".

The first Octopush competition was a three-way tournament between teams from Southsea, Bournemouth, and Brighton underwater hockey clubs in early 1955. Southsea won then, and they are still highly ranked at national level today winning 20 out of 52 national championships.

The sport spread to Durban, South Africa in the mid/late 1950s, thanks to the spearfishermen of the Durban Undersea Club (DUC), when dirty summer seas prevented the young bloods from getting their weekly exercise and excitement. The first games were played in the pool of club member Max Doveton. However it soon became so popular that weekly contests were held in a municipal pool. The UK's Octopush used a small paddle to push the puck whilst the South Africans used a mini hockey stick. Whilst the "long stick" version of underwater hockey did spread outside of South Africa, the UK's 'short stick' version ultimately prevailed and is how UWH is universally played now.

In the Americas, the game first came to Canada in 1962 via Norm Leibeck, an unconventional Australian scuba diving instructor and dive shop owner, who introduced the sport to a Vancouver dive club. Ten years later, the Underwater Hockey Association of British Columbia (UHABC) was formed and received support from the BC government.

Underwater hockey has been played in Australia since 1966, again because of Norm Leibeck, the same Australian who returned from Canada with his Canadian bride Marlene, and it now attracts players from a wide range of backgrounds there. The first Australian Underwater Hockey Championships were held in Margaret River, Western Australia in 1975. A Women's division was added to the championships in 1981 and a Junior division commenced in 1990.

In Asia, the game first came to the Philippines in the late 1970s through growing awareness of Octopush within the scuba diving community.

Footage from British Pathe of an early game at Aldershot Lido in 1967, and from British Sub-Aqua Club archives, is evidence of the evolution of the sport in terms of equipment and playing style. It can be seen that the game was much slower and the puck was not flicked at all, in contrast to the modern sport where the substantial changes in equipment, team size, and other factors have helped make the game the international sport it is today, with 68 teams from 19 countries competing at the 18th World Championship in 2013 at Eger in Hungary making this the pinnacle in terms of international competition to date.

== Geography ==
Country	First Played	Article	Body	National Team
Great Britain (Note: Underwater hockey is organised on an all-Ireland basis, therefore information about the sport in Northern Ireland is grouped with the Republic of Ireland.)	1954	Underwater hockey in Great Britain	British Octopush Association ( (Scotland) SUWH) ( (Wales) UHW)	Great Britain
South Africa	1957	None	South African Underwater Sports Federation	
Canada	1962	None		
New Zealand	1964	Underwater hockey in New Zealand	Underwater Hockey New Zealand	
Australia	1966	Underwater hockey in Australia	Underwater Hockey Australia	Australia
France	1967	None	Fédération Française d'Études et de Sports Sous-Marins	
United States	1970	None		
The Netherlands	1971	None		
The Philippines	1979	None	Philippine Underwater Hockey Confederation	
Japan	1979 (Note: Suspended from 1989 to 2004)	None		
Hong Kong	1980 (Note: Activities started in 1980 but almost immediately stopped, restarted 2015)	None		
Switzerland	1982 (Note: No activities between 1986 and 2007)	None		
Argentina	1983	None		
Colombia	1990	None		
Serbia	1996	None		
Germany	1997	None		
Israel	1997	None		
Italy	1997	None		
Spain	1997	None	Federación Española de Actividades Subacuáticas	
Turkey	1999	Underwater hockey in Turkey	Turkish Underwater Sports Federation	Turkey
Moldova	2000	None		
Singapore	2004	None		
China	2009	None		
Indonesia	2010	None		
Saudi Arabia	2016	None		
Brazil	2016	None		
Malaysia	2016	None		
United Arab Emirates	2007	None		
South Korea	2019	None		
Belgium	????	None	Nelos (Flanders), Lifras (Wallonia)	Red Piranhas (Men) & Red Mermaids (Women)
Portugal	????	None		
(Republic of Ireland) (Northern Ireland) Ireland	????	None	Comhairle Fo-Thuinn	
Denmark	2022		Dansk Sportsdykker Forbund	
Poland	????			
Hungary	????			

== Play ==
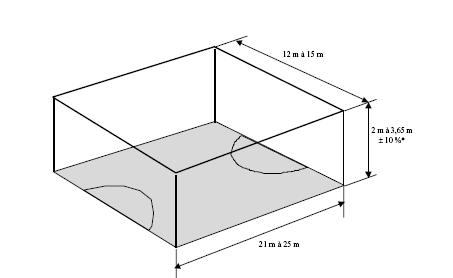
Typical dimensions of an underwater hockey pool

Two teams of up to ten players compete, with six players in each team in play at any one time. The remaining four players are continually substituted into play from a substitution area, which may be either on deck or in the water outside the playing area.

Before the start of play the puck is placed in the centre of the pool, and the players wait in the water whilst touching the wall above the goal they are defending. At the start-of-play signal (usually a buzzer or a gong) members of both teams are free to swim anywhere in the play area and try to score by manoeuvring the puck into the opponents' goal using only their stick. Players hold their breath as they dive to the bottom of the pool (a form of dynamic apnoea, as in free-diving). Play continues until either a goal is scored, when players return to their wall to start a new point, or a break in play is signalled by a referee (most commonly due to a foul or calling time for the half).

Games consist of two halves of fifteen minutes with a three-minute half-time, with teams switching ends at the end of the first half. Timing of games can vary by competition due to a number of reasons, most commonly organisational logistics; however, tier tournaments tend not to see any variation.

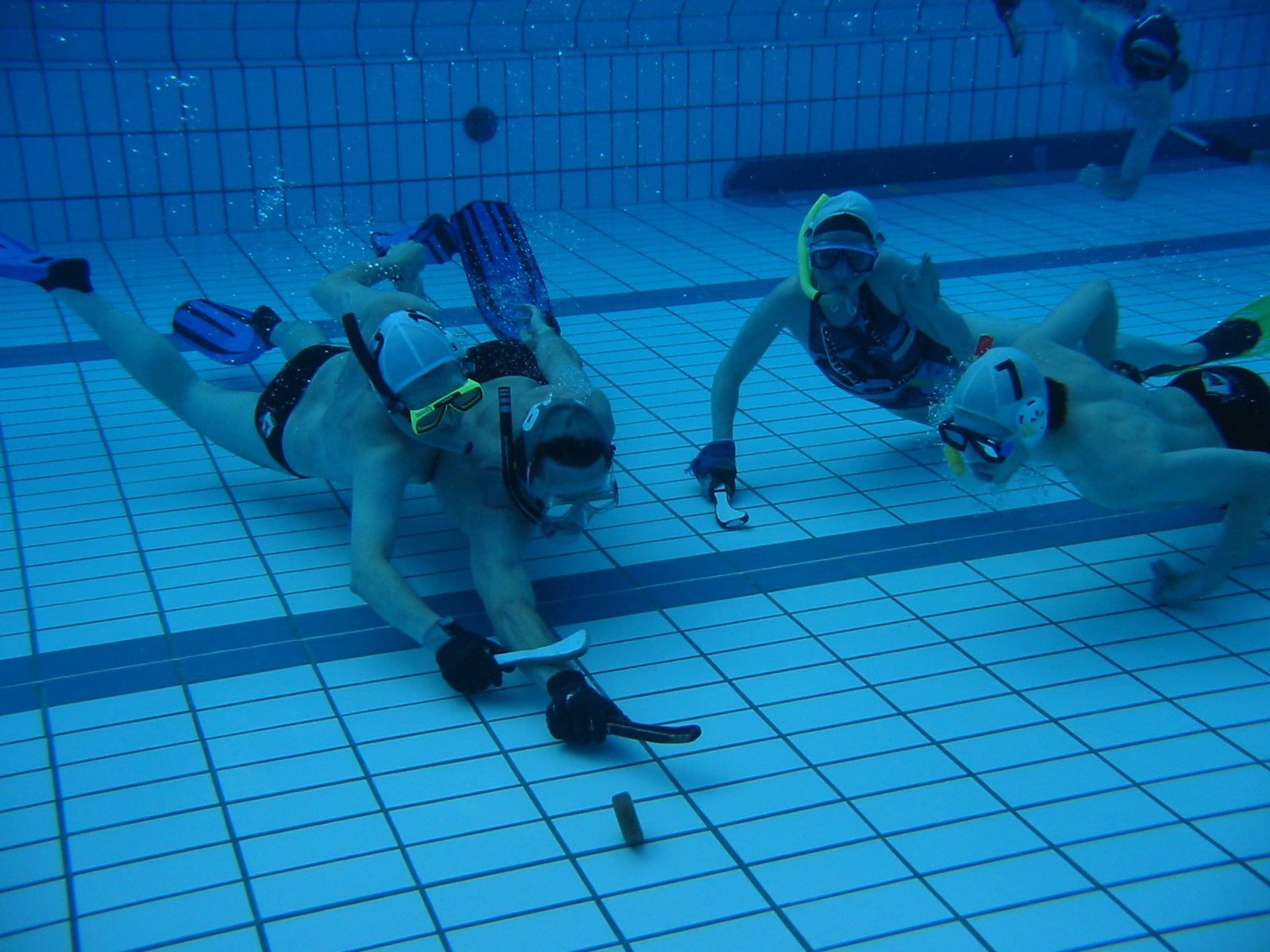
Black team defends the goal (back right of the image) from the White attack

Unlike most other sports, formations are read from front to back instead of back to front:

3-3 formation
Left Forward	Centre	Right Forward
Left Back	Centre Back	Right Back

The typical playing formation is 3-3 consisting of three forwards and three backs. Other common formations include 2-3-1, 1-3-2, and 2-2-2. Formations are generally very fluid and are constantly evolving with different national teams being proponents of particular tweaks in formations. One example of this is New Zealand with their "box formation" (2-1-2-1).

1-3-2 formation
	Centre Forward
Left Forward	Centre	Right Forward
Left Back		Right Back

2-3-1 formation
Left Forward		Right Forward
Left Back	Centre	Right Back
	Centre Back

During the game, each team gets unlimited rolling substitution with the (maximum of) four players in their sub box. Substitution strategy is imperative in underwater hockey as errors might result in a foul i.e. too many players in the play area at one time (an offence punishable by the sin bin) or a tactical blunder (e.g. an incorrect balance of forwards and backs due to an incorrect substitution).

There are a number of penalties described in the official underwater hockey rules, ranging from the use of the stick against something (or someone) other than the puck, playing or stopping the puck with something other than the stick, and "blocking" (interposing one's self between a teammate who possesses the puck and an opponent; one is allowed to play the puck but not merely block opponents with one's body). If the penalty is minor, referees award an advantage puck: the team that committed the foul is pushed back 3 metres (9.8 ft) from the puck, while the other team gets free possession. For major penalties such as a dangerous pass (e.g. striking an opponent's head) or intentional or repeated fouls, the referees may eject players for a specified period of time or for the remainder of the game, or even - in the case of very serious or deliberate fouls - for the remainder of a tournament. A defender committing a serious foul sufficiently close to his own goal may be penalised by the award of a penalty shot or even a penalty goal awarded to the fouled player's team.

Players who are successful in this game are strong swimmers, have an ability to hold and recover their breath, and are able to produce speed underwater while demonstrating learned skills in puck control. It is also important that they are able to work with their team members and take advantage of their individual skills.

== Variations of play ==
=== 4-a-side ===
4-a-side underwater hockey is when there is four people per team playing at a given time. The teams usually consist of up to eight players with four subs. 4-a-side competitions are less common, though notable examples are the Hamilton 4-asides, Dunedin 4's (both New Zealand), and the BOA 4s.

== Classification ==
There have been debates throughout the sport's history on its classification as either a breath-control sports or an extreme-apnoea sport. Though a 2023 study on submersion times in matches ranging from club friendlies to national championship matches found that the average player's submersion time was 12.1 seconds when in possession of the puck and 9.3 when without the puck, thus falling short of the 45 second breath hold requirement for clarification as an extreme-apnoea sport.

== Equipment ==
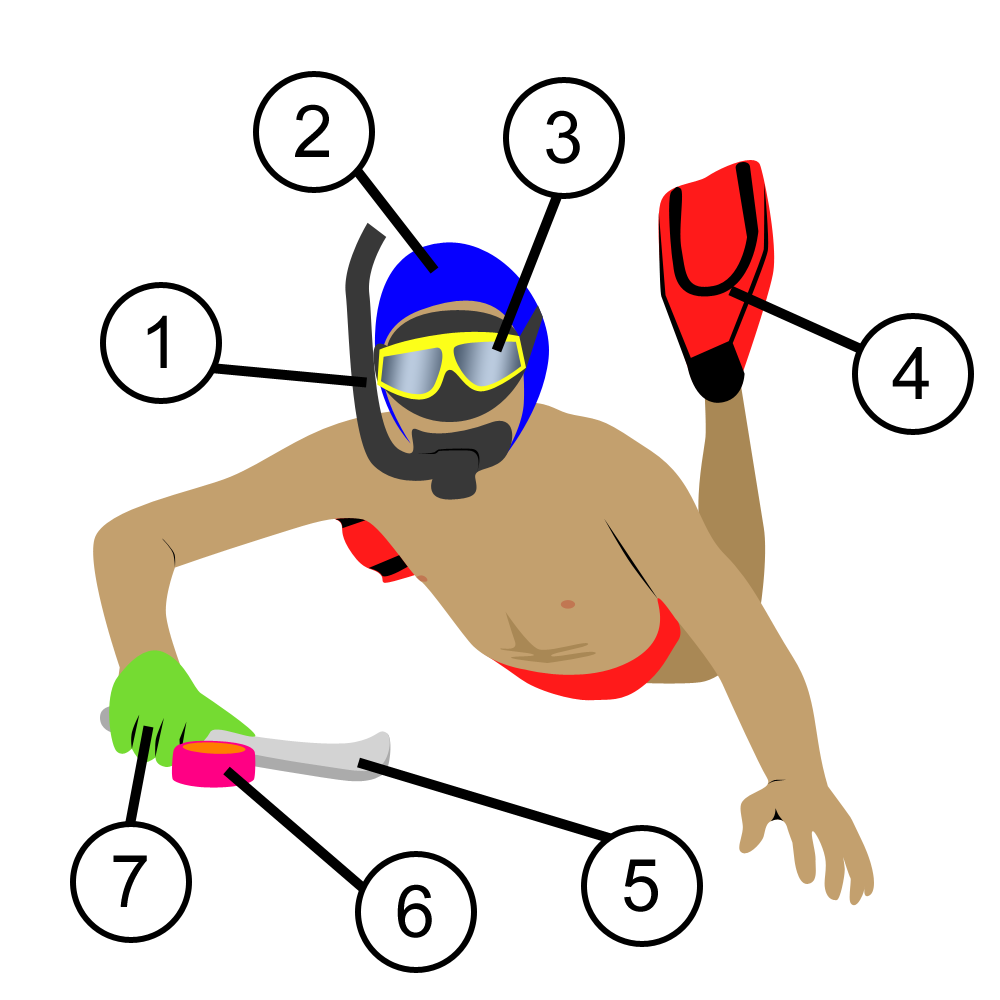
Annotated Player: 1. snorkel and mouth guard 2. hat with ear guards 3. mask 4. fins 5. stick 6. puck 7. glove

Players wear a diving mask, snorkel and fins, and carry in one (either) hand a short stick or pusher for playing the puck. A full list of equipment is given below:

=== Swimwear ===
There are usually no restrictions on swimwear, however baggy trunks or shorts are not recommended as they reduce speed and increase drag in the water. Typical swimwear is swim briefs or jammers for male players and athletic style racerback two-piece swimsuits with drawstring bottoms or one-piece swimsuits for female players. Additionally, wetsuits are not allowed according to Rule 3.3.8 of the CMAS International Rules for Underwater Hockey, Eleventh Edition.

=== Mask ===
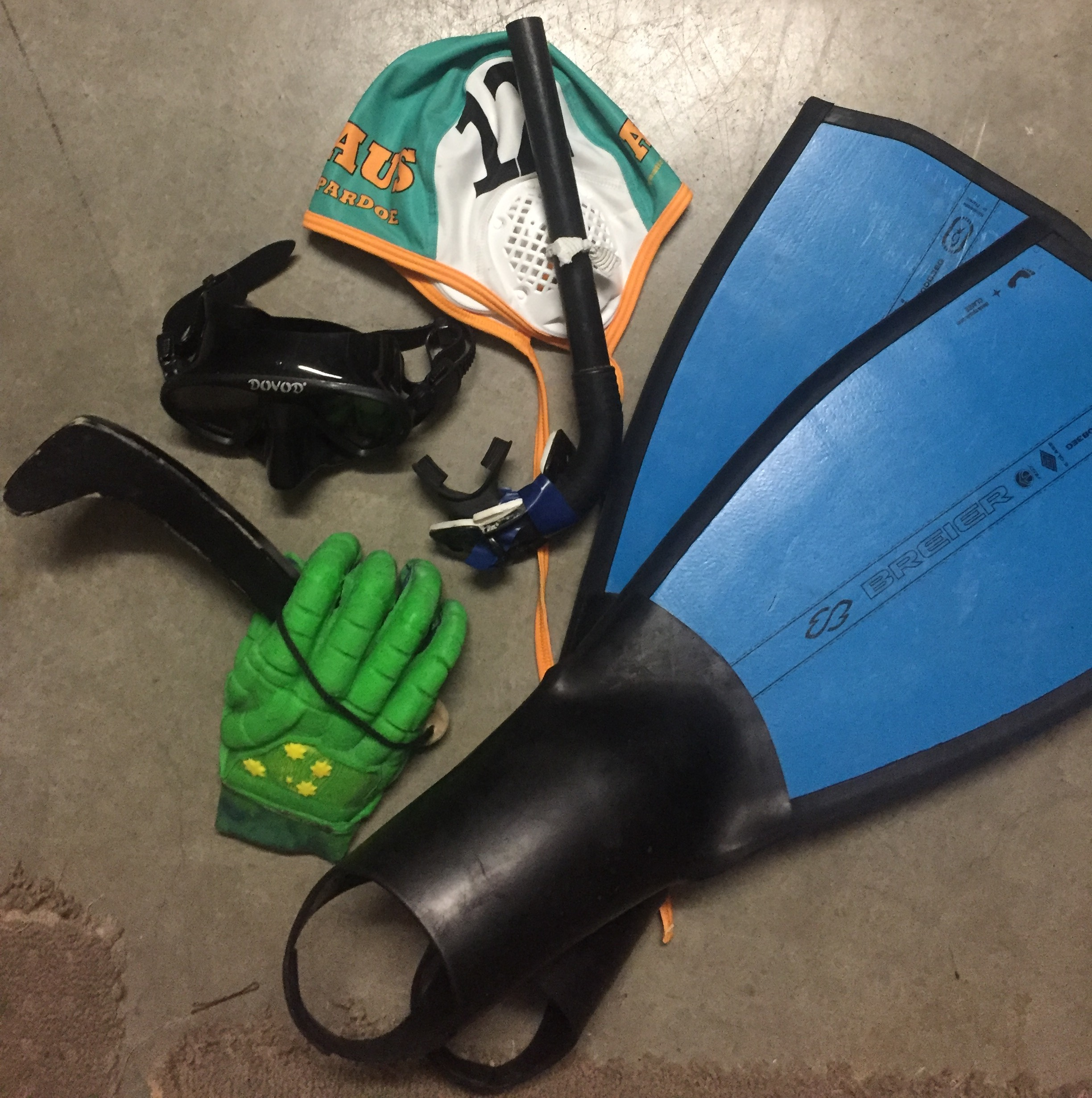
Worlds Competition Grade Equipment

A diving mask is used for several reasons:

- Players can equalise their ears (using the Valsalva manoeuvre) as the nose is covered
- Unlike swim goggles, a mask sits outside the eye's orbit, reducing the effects of any impact
- Improved underwater vision

A low-volume mask with minimal protrusion from the face reduces the likelihood of the mask being knocked causing it to leak or flood and temporarily obstruct the player's vision. The published rules require masks to have two lenses to reduce the risk and extent of possible injury from puck impact; the danger of a single lens mask is that the aperture may be large enough to allow a puck to pass through it on impact, and hence into the player's eyes. A number of webbing strap designs are available to replace the original head strap with a non-elastic strap that can reduce the possibility of the player being unmasked.

=== Snorkel ===
A snorkel enables players to watch the progress of the game without having to lift their head from the water to breathe. This allows them to keep their position on the surface, ready to join play once they are able. In order to maximise the efficiency of breathing and reduce drag underwater snorkels are often short with a wide bore and may include a drain valve. The published rules mandate that they must not be rigid or have any sharp edges or points.

The snorkel may accommodate an external mouthguard which may be worn in conjunction with, or instead of, an internal mouthguard.

=== Fins ===
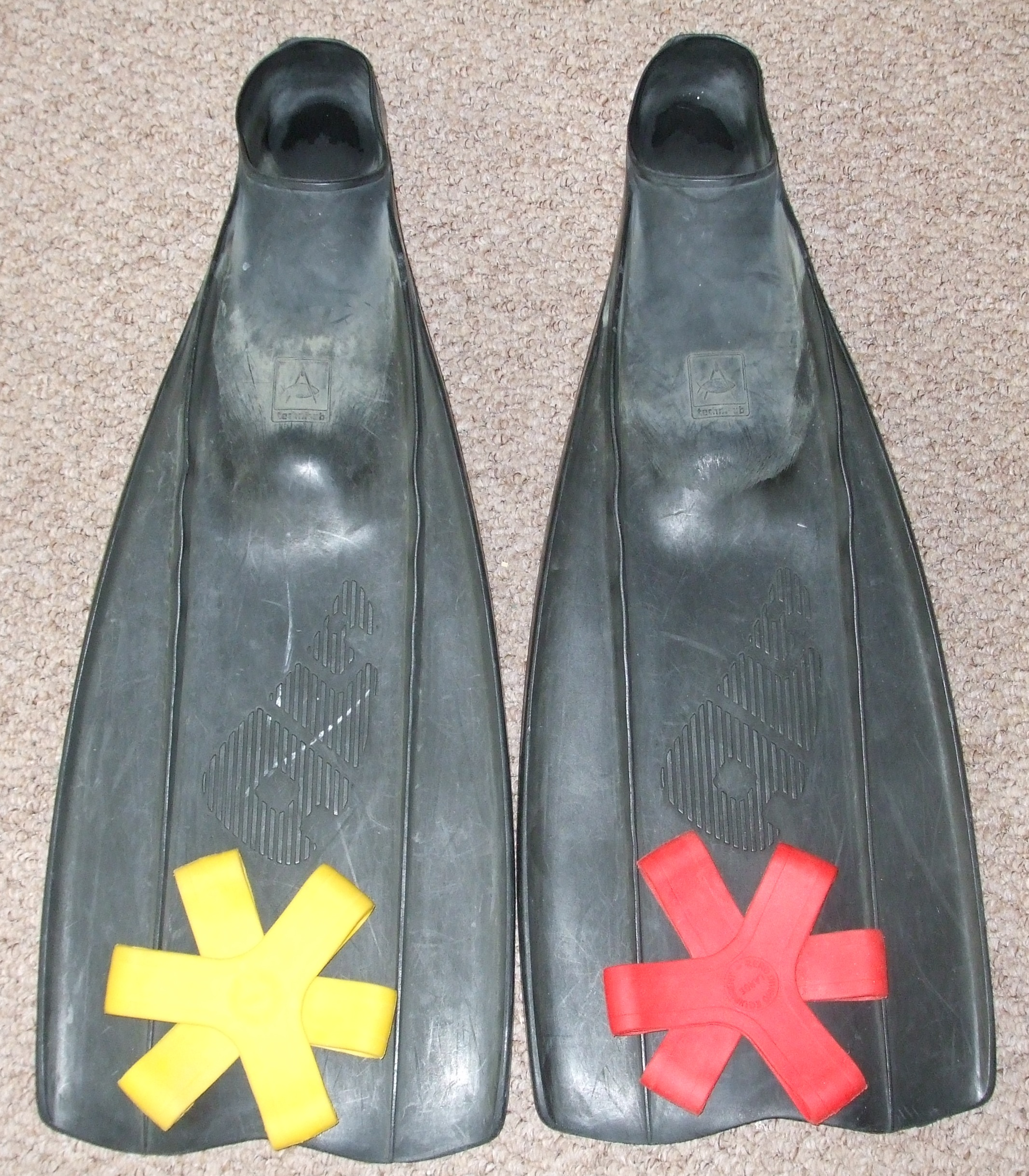
Technisub Ala underwater hockey fins with fin grips

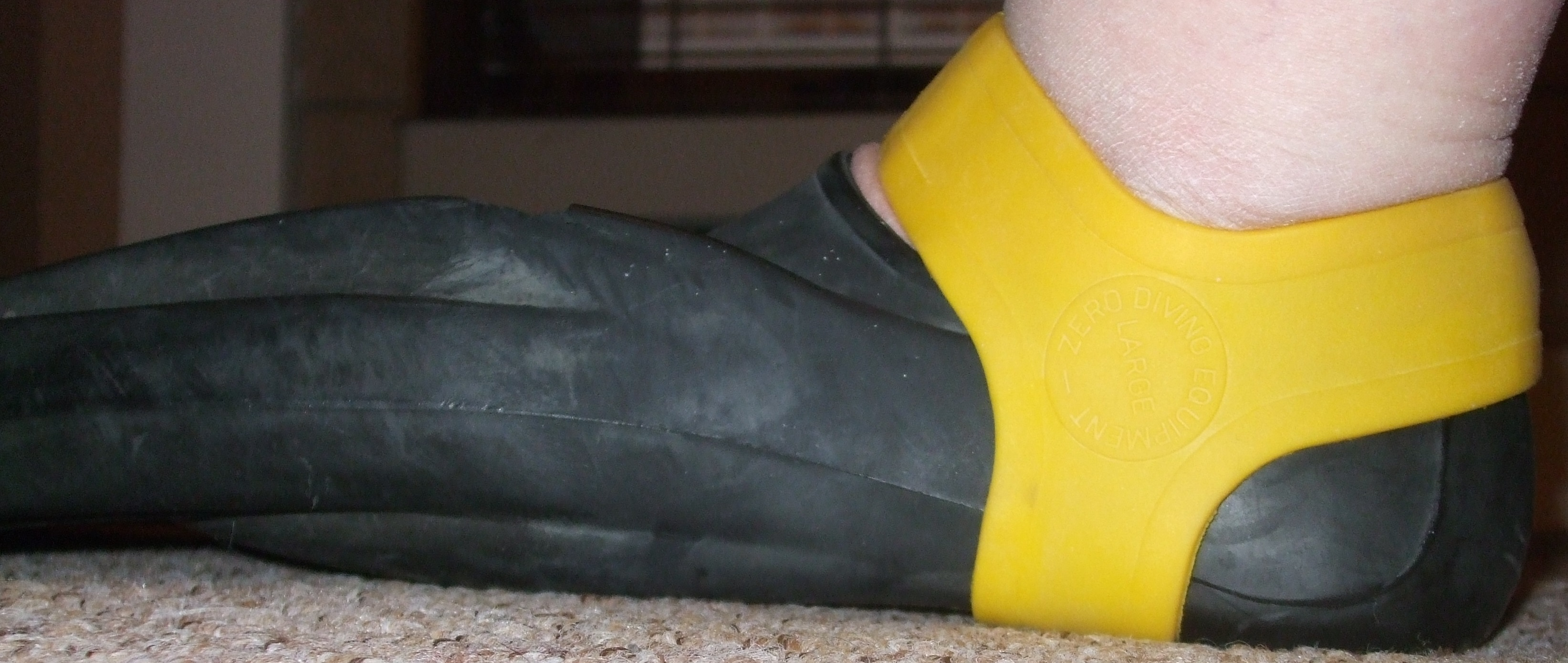
A fin grip positioned to secure a full-foot fin on the foot

Fins allow the player to swim faster through the water. A wide variety of fins are used in the sport, but large plastic/rubber composite fins or smaller, stiffer fibreglass or carbon fibre fins are commonplace at competitions. As with any of the equipment, the published rules mandate fins without sharp edges or corners. All sharp edges must be covered up by a protective film or tape to prevent injury. Players are also normally required to use closed-heel fins (without buckles) as a further injury prevention measure.

Even well-fitting full-foot fins can occasionally be pulled off during play, either because of physical contact with something in the playing area or as a result of the power the wearer is transmitting through them into the water. When this occurs, stopping to refit a lost fin takes time and reduces a team to only five players. Fin grips, also known as fin retainers or fin keepers, are triple-strap devices enabling a closed-heel fin to be held more securely on a player's foot. They are worn around the arch, the heel and the instep to try and prevent the wearer's foot from slipping out of the foot-pocket of the fin.

=== Stick ===
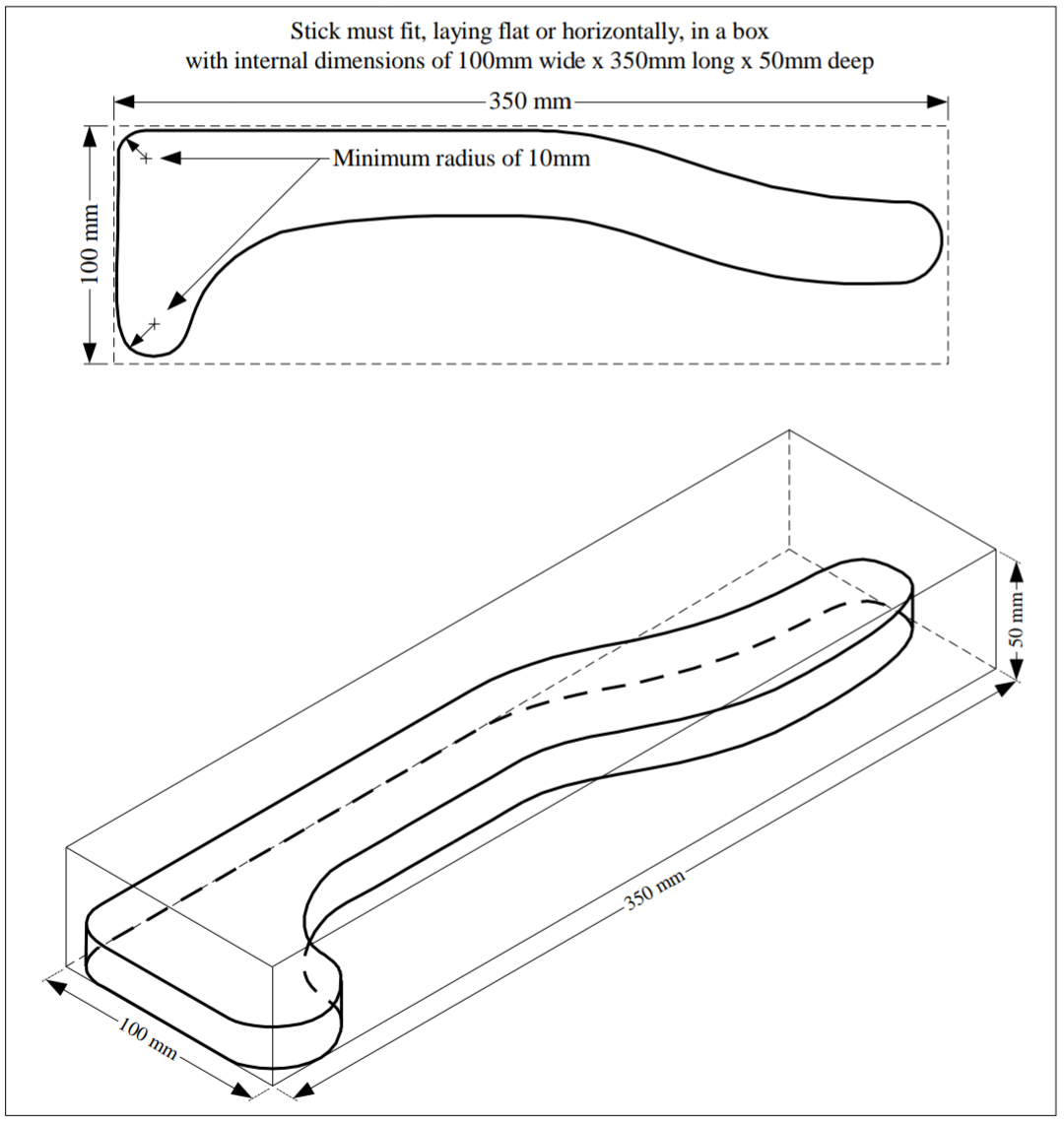
Stick design constraints

The stick (also referred to as a pusher) is relatively short and is coloured either white or black to indicate the player's team. The stick may only be held in one hand, which is usually determined by the player's handedness, although players may swap hands during play. The shape of the stick may affect playing style and is often a very personal choice. A wide variety of stick designs are allowed within the constraints of the rules of the game, the principal rules being that the stick (including the handle) must fit into a box of 100 mm × 50 mm × 350 mm (3.9 in × 2.0 in × 13.8 in) and that the stick must not be capable of surrounding either the puck or any part of the hand. A rule concerning the minimum radius of edges tries to address the risk of injury should body contact occur. Construction materials may be of wood or plastics and current rules now supersede those that previously required sticks to be homogeneous, although they almost always are anyway. Many underwater hockey players manufacture their own sticks to their preferred shape and style, although there are increasingly more mass-produced designs to suit the majority (such as Bentfish, Britbat, CanAm, Dorsal, Stingray etc.).

=== Puck ===
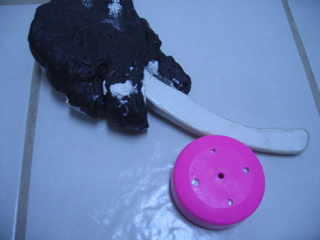
Underwater Hockey puck pushed by stick

The puck is approximately the size of an ice hockey puck but is made of lead or lead-based material - (adult size weighs 1.3–1.5 kg (2.9–3.3 lb), junior 800–850 g (1.76–1.87 lb)) - and is encapsulated or surrounded by a plastic covering which is usually performance-matched to different pool bottoms (e.g. tiles, concrete etc.) to facilitate good grip on the stick face while preventing excessive friction on the pool bottom. The puck's weight brings it to rest on the pool bottom, though it can be lofted during passes.

=== Caps ===
Safety gear includes ear protection, usually in the form of a water polo cap and as a secondary indicator of the player's team (coloured black/dark or white/pale as appropriate). Water referees wear red caps.

=== Glove ===
A glove should be worn on the playing hand to protect against pool-bottom abrasion and, in some designs, for protection against puck impact on knuckles and other vulnerable areas, however no rigid protection is permitted. Players may choose to wear a protective glove on both hands, either as additional protection from the pool bottom or, for ambidextrous players, to switch the stick between hands mid-play. A glove used in competition must be a contrasting colour to the wearer's stick, but not orange which is reserved for referees' gloves - this is so water referees might be able to better distinguish between a pusher making a legal contact with the puck and a hand making an illegal contact with the puck. It is also usually preferred that a players glove is a different colour to the puck. As the puck is usually pink or orange it means players should avoid gloves coloured black, white, red, orange, yellow and pink. A referee at any match or tournament can ask a player to use different kit before they play, hence players should be careful when choosing the colour of their gloves. Blue is often used due to the limitations on glove colours, but others have also been used.

=== Goal ===
The goals (or 'gulleys') are 3 metres (9.8 ft) wide and are sited on the pool bottom at opposite ends of the playing area in the centre of the end lines. They consist of a shallow slope leading up to a trough into which the puck may be pushed or flicked.

Goals are commonly constructed from aluminium, galvanised steel or stainless steel. This makes them negatively buoyant and durable in the chlorinated water of swimming pools.

== Referees ==
Referee (back right) in yellow

Officiating the game are two (or three) water referees (i.e. in the pool with full snorkelling gear, and wearing a distinctive red cap, orange gloves and golden yellow shirt) to observe and referee play at the pool bottom, and one or more poolside deck referees to track time (both playing times and penalty times for penalised players), maintain the score, and call fouls (such as excessive number of players in play, failure to start a point from the end of the playing area, or another foul capable of being committed at or noticed from the surface). The deck (chief) referee responds to hand signals given by the water referees to start and stop play, including after an interruption such as a foul or time-out, or indeed to stop play if they themself see a rule infringement.

The Official Rules, which are available for download in PDF form without charge, define (with illustrations) a valid goal, the fouls and signals, the dimensions of the playing area, sticks, and goals, team composition and substitution procedure, and additional rules and arrangements for multi-team tournaments and championships.

== Spectators ==
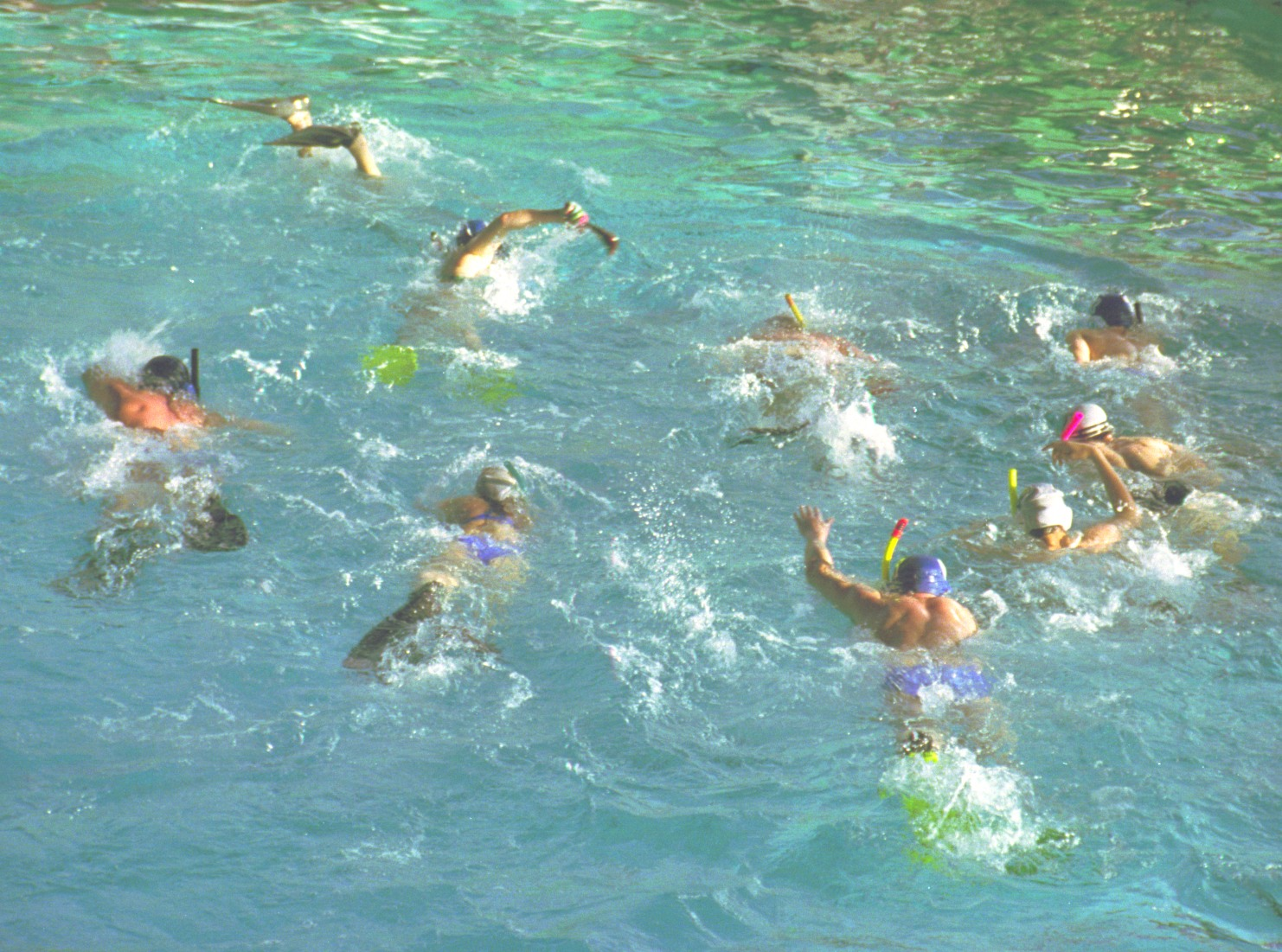
Octopush contest seen from the surface, at Crystal Palace Pool, London

At a club or training level, underwater hockey is not seen as particularly spectator-friendly. Very few pools have underwater viewing ports, and since the action is all below the surface, an observer would usually have to enter the water to see the skill and complexities of the game. Spectators may either put on mask, fins and snorkel and enter the pool for a view of the playing area, or possibly take advantage of the work of underwater videographers who have recorded major tournaments. Such tournaments often have live footage on large screens for the spectators. The 2006 (Sheffield, England) and 2010 (Durban, South Africa) Underwater Hockey World Championships were screened poolside and simultaneously webcast live to spectators around the world, while the 2008 European Championship in Istanbul, Turkey had video coverage but no live streaming.

Filming the games is challenging even for the experienced videographer, as the players' movements are fast and there are few places on the surface or beneath it which are free from their seemingly frenzied movements. Games are often played width-wise across a 50-metre pool to provide spaces in between simultaneous games for player substitutes, penalty boxes, coaches and camera crews. However, research and development of filming techniques is ongoing.

Organisers of major tournaments are usually the point of contact for acquiring footage of underwater hockey matches. Although no official worldwide repository exists for recorded games, there are websites and instructional DVDs. A variety of related footage can be found on video sharing sites.

== Injuries ==
Although it is a limited-contact sport, there is a significant risk of injury. Many injuries are typical sports injuries such as sprains, torn muscles and light scratches. More major injuries might include deeper cuts, broken fingers, impacts to the head causing concussion or dental trauma, and there is also a minor risk of life-threatening injury from being struck on the head with the possibility of a major concussion or blackout underwater. There is an obvious risk of drowning if knocked unconscious underwater, but the players are under observation by the referees during competition, and players in any case tend to be very aware of what their teammates are doing or not doing; in practice an unconscious or seriously injured player is likely to be noticed and assisted or rescued very promptly. Personal protective equipment is available to reduce injury risks, and the published rules make items such as gloves, mouth guards and ear guards mandatory. There is a risk of pulmonary capillary stress failure (Hemoptysis) in some players.

== International competition ==
=== World Championships ===
The Underwater Hockey World Championships, organised by the Confédération Mondiale des Activités Subaquatiques (CMAS), have been held every two years since 1980. The tournament began with a men's competition only, with a women's tournament added in 1982. 1992 saw the addition of a men's master's tournament with the women's master's tournament coming in 1998. 2002 saw a youth league trialled at the tournament with a full U-19 division for both men and women coming in 2007.

In 2007, CMAS attempted to start the CMAS World Games, an Olympic-style event for all the sports CMAS governed. This ultimately failed, however, as it required all the sports to move away from their pre-established calendars, resulting in the 2007 World Games being the only one ever played. This move also caused a schism, with the World Aquachallenge Association attempting to create their own World Championships, but again just one version ultimately took place (in 2008), with CMAS asserting control again with the 2009 Championships but in the case of elite competitions only. In 2013, master's tournaments were again added and the youth tournaments became a separate event, involving U-23 divisions in addition to the U-19 division. Elite and master's competitions reverted to even years in 2016 with the youth competition remaining on odd years. This switch following the resumption of international hockey after the COVID-19 pandemic began with the 2023 elite and master's World Championships.

At Elite level, New Zealand are the current Men's World Champions, and Australia are the current Women's World Champions.

At Masters level, United States are the current Men's World Champions, and France are the current Women's World Champions.

At U-24 level, New Zealand are the current Men's World Champions, and New Zealand are the current Women's World Champions.

At U-19 level, Turkey are the current Men's World Champions, and Colombia are the current Women's World Champions.

=== European Championships ===
The Underwater Hockey European Championships, also ran by CMAS, are every two years on alternate years to the world championships. Unlike the world championships there are no masters or youth division.

Due to the COVID-19 pandemic, no editions have been played since 2019 where Turkey won the men's competition and France won the women's competition.

=== South East Asian Games ===
Underwater Hockey was included as a sport for the first and only time in South East Asia Games in 2019.

=== Celtic Cup ===
The Celtic Cup was instituted in 2022 for the national teams of Scotland, Wales, and Ireland.

== Governing bodies ==
Political turmoil within the CMAS Underwater Hockey Commission (Confédération Mondiale des Activités Subaquatiques), the underwater hockey world governing body, came to a head soon after the 2006 Underwater Hockey World Championships, resulting in the CMAS Underwater Hockey Commission members resigning en masse and soon thereafter forming an alternative 'world governing body' solely for the sport of UWH, known as the World Aquachallenge Association (WAA), and which was officially ratified at the 1st WAA World Championship in April–May 2008. Consequently, from this point the UWH community had two world governing bodies, CMAS and WAA.

CMAS has continued to organise international world competitions on a bi-annual basis. CMAS tried unsuccessfully to hold another World Underwater Games event in 2009 after a successful event in 2007. These were intended to be multi-disciplinary events thereby grouping UWH with other CMAS-represented sports including fin swimming and underwater rugby. The 1st World Games were held in Bari, Italy, in 2007 while the 2nd was scheduled for Tunisia in 2009 but was cancelled and rescheduled as an UWH-only event held in Kranj, Slovenia, during August 2009. It was billed as a World Championship but only one non-European country competed (South Africa); France won the Open division while Great Britain took the Women's title. In the years in between World Games CMAS holds Zone Championships (e.g. the 15th European Championship in Eger, Hungary, during 2017).

WAA attempted to continue with the original World Championship series on a biennial basis during years ending with an even number. The 1st WAA Championships (renumbered; it would have been the CMAS 15th) was held in 2008 in Durban, South Africa. The 2nd competition was scheduled for Medellín, Colombia, in August 2010 but it proceeded as an International Event without WAA sanctioning and became the precursor for the development of the independent America's Cup International Tournament.

The European (CMAS) and the rest of the World (WAA) events following the split were held over exactly the same period in 2008 a continent apart. This dichotomy of championships coupled with the real possibility of future sanctions by CMAS on their member countries' organisations and athletes led to many countries being forced to choose which competition to send their team to. As a result, neither competition in 2008 was as well attended as had been the case in previous years, nor as competitive. Subsequently, no WAA sanctioned events have taken place since 2008. However, in Europe at least, well-organised international tournaments without CMAS or WAA influence (such as at Breda in the Netherlands, Barcelona in Spain, and České Budějovice in the Czech Republic) continue to be regularly attended by a range of club teams from across the continent.

In 2009, a new CMAS Underwater Hockey Commission was appointed for a 4-year period to guide the sport on a technical level and gradually it has reconsolidated the sport and produced a development plan to cope with future growth. The commission continues to work to develop relationships with CMAS Board of Directors and obtain support for its development plan.

As part of this plan the Commission developed an Age Group-based International Championship incorporating Under 19, Under 23 and Masters (Men >35, Women >32) Grades. This Championship was held in July 2011 in Dordrecht, Netherlands. The event was to be sanctioned by CMAS but the Dutch organising team withdrew their hosting bid and proceeded to host the event successfully with 36 teams participating. As the event was non-compliant with the CMAS Competition procedures, Scotland was able to compete as a separate country rather than within a combined entity as Great Britain.

As the surviving governing body, as of August 2013 CMAS has the following countries and territories affiliated with its Underwater Hockey Commission: Australia, Belgium, Canada, Colombia, Croatia, Cyprus, Czech Republic, France, Germany, Great Britain, Hong Kong, Hungary, Indonesia, Ireland, Italy, Japan, Malaysia, Netherlands, New Zealand, Portugal, Serbia, Slovenia, South Africa, Spain, Turkey, United States.

== See also ==
- Underwater Hockey World Championships – International event for the sport of Underwater Hockey
