= Underwater Society of America =

American national representative organization for underwater sport

- Abbreviation: USOA
- Predecessor: AAU National Competitive Skindivers Committee
- Type: NGO
- Legal status: A Maryland Not-For-Profit Corporation
- Purpose: Peak body for underwater sports & recreational diving
- Location: PO Box 628 Daly City, CA 94017, United States
- Region served: United States
- President: Karen Thullner
- Vice President: William Van Deman
- General Secretary: Michael Gower
- Main organ: Executive Committee
- Affiliations: CMAS; DEMA; DAN; USOC
- Website: http://www.underwater-society.org/

The Underwater Society of America (USOA) is the peak body for underwater sport and recreational diving in the United States.

== Organisation ==
The USOA is a membership-based organisation consisting of individuals, clubs and regional councils. Its day-to-day operations are controlled by an executive committee which reports to a board of governors and the delegates of the member councils and clubs.

== Origins and history ==
The USOA was established by a number of regional organisations in 1959 after the founding of Confédération Mondiale des Activités Subaquatiques (CMAS) initially to organise spearfishing teams for international competition. Prior to its creation, national competition in spearfishing (or skindiving as it was and is still known) and scuba diving was organised by the National Competitive Skindivers Committee of the Amateur Athletic Union (AAU). The National Competitive Skindivers Committee has previously established in 1954 as an initiative of both the AAU and the International Underwater Spearfishing Association (IUSA) and was the body representing the United States at the foundation of CMAS.

== Recognition ==
The USOA is a member of the following organisations - CMAS with affiliation to the sport, technical and scientific committees, the CMAS American Zone, the Divers Alert Network (DAN), the Diving Equipment and Marketing Association (DEMA) and the United States Olympic Committee (USOC).

== Underwater sport ==
USOA supports competition at all levels within the United States for the following underwater sports: competition scuba, finswimming, freediving, spearfishing, underwater hockey, underwater photography and underwater rugby. Competition is available at international level for all sports except for competition scuba.

== Diver training ==
As of August 2013, the USOA does not offer diver training. During 2010, USOA entered in an agreement with the Scuba Educators International (SEI) to permit SEI to issue CMAS International Diver Training Certificates on its behalf.

== Awards ==
The USOA both operates and participates in the following awards and recognition schemes.

It honors its own athletes with the Man & Woman Athlete of the Year being awarded for each sport. All national champions from any sponsored sport are also inducted into the All American Dive Team. There are also two underwater hockey sportsmanship awards - the Dan Wilkins Memorial Award for the National Championships and the Carl Judd Memorial Award for the Pacific Coast Championships.

The USOA was the original supporter of the NOGI Award which is presumably named after the New Orleans Grand Isle Fishing Tournament which included an underwater section and was created during the 1950s to recognise leaders in all forms of underwater diving. The NOGI awards scheme is now the responsibility of the Academy of Underwater Arts and Sciences.

In the tradition of the NOGI award, the USOA also recognizes divers within the United States at the regional level with The Regional Divers of the Year Award in the categories of art, sports, education, science and service.

As an affiliate of the United States Olympic Committee (USOC), the USOA is eligible to nominate individuals for the USOC Athlete of the Year.

The USOA also is a joint-founder and a sponsor of the Women Divers Hall of Fame.

== International Bluewater Spearfishing Records Committee ==
The International Bluewater Spearfishing Records Committee (IBSRC) by agreement with the USOA operates as a ‘council of special interest’ within the USOA. The IBSRC was established in 1996 to promote ‘ethical, safe and sporting spearfishing practices, to establish uniform regulations for the compilation of world-bluewater gamefish records, and to provide basic spearfishing guidelines for use in bluewater contests and any other bluewater spearfishing activities worldwide.’

== See also ==
- Christ of the Abyss – Submerged statue of Jesus Christ
- John Pennekamp Coral Reef State Park – State park at Key Largo, Florida, USA
- Joel Armas – Cuban finswimmer (born 1973)
- List of United States records in finswimming
- Misty Hyman – American swimmer (born 1979)
- Peppo Biscarini – Italian and American swimmer, freediver, and actor
- Texas Finswimming Association – Official governing body for competitive and recreational finswimming in Texas
- Texas Open Finswimming Invitational – Open finswimming competition held in Texas since 1999
