= Finswimming in the United States =

Competitive watersport

Finswimming in the United States (USA) is practised at both regional and national level via a network of associations and other bodies affiliated to the national governing body, USA Finswimming which is part of the Underwater Society of America (USOA).

== Governance ==
The governing body is USA Finswimming which is part of the Underwater Society of America (USOA).

== Competitions ==
=== Regional ===
Regional competition started in 1985. The major areas for finswimming in the United States are Texas and California. In Texas, the following suburbs of Houston are claimed to have the largest concentration of finswimmers in the USA: Pasadena and Deer Park while in California, the area around the national headquarters for USA Finswimming in San Francisco is a centre of activity. Other regions experiencing activity include Florida, Hawaii, New Jersey and Rhode Island. Texas hosted the majority of the finswimming competitions in the USA during the first decade of the 21st century including the following annual events - the Texas Open Finswimming Invitational, the Gulf Coast International Finswimming Invitational and the Texas State Finswimming Championships. The United States Scholar-Athlete Games at the University of Rhode Island have included finswimming as a part of its Games program since 1999. Most finswimming practised outside of Texas and California is for cross training associated with swimming.

=== National ===
National Championships commenced in 1989.

=== International ===
==== World Senior Championships ====
The United States has competed at the World Championships since 1986. Appearances at the championships include China in 1994, Hungary in 1996, Spain in 2000 and Bari, Italy in 2007. The 1996 team consisted of about 20 finswimmers and support personnel including notable Olympic swimmer, Misty Hyman. The USA finished 20th in a field of 30 countries while Hyman achieved sixth place in the women's 50 m surface swim. The 2000 team was able to finish 17th in a field of 42 countries thanks in part of the performance of Texan finswimmer, Kristine Kelly.

==== Multi sport events ====
The following multi sport events which were held within the United States, have included finswimming races contested by American swimmers - the World Corporate Games held in San Francisco during 1988 and in Concord, California during 1989, and the World Scholar-Athlete Games at the University of Rhode Island which have included finswimming as a part of its program on a regular basis since 1999.

== See also ==
- List of United States records in finswimming
- Joel Armas – Cuban finswimmer
- Peppo Biscarini – Italian and American swimmer, freediver, and actor
