= Finswimming in the United Kingdom =

Competitive watersport

Finswimming in the United Kingdom (UK) is practised at both regional and national level via a network of clubs affiliated to a national body, the British Finswimming Association (BFA).

== Governance ==
=== British Finswimming Association ===
The BFA is considered by proponents of finswimming being as the National Governing Body for Finswimming in the United Kingdom. However, as of November 2013, the British government recognises the British Sub-Aqua Club (BSAC) as being the National Governing Body responsible for this sport.

The BFA was formed in 1999 following the creation of the British Underwater Sports Association in 1998 as a body to represent British underwater sports to the Confédération Mondiale des Activités Subaquatiques (CMAS) following the expulsion of the BSAC as the CMAS affiliate for the UK. BFA's membership of the BUSA entitles it to compete in international competitions conducted under the auspices of CMAS. The BFA is club-based organisation managed on a day-to-day basis by an executive committee. Its services include the provision of public liability insurance and access to a coaching program.

=== Clubs ===
As of April 2017, competition at a regional level within the UK is offered by the following clubs:

- ASKA Club (Chester)
- FinWorld Finswimming Club (London)
- Hampshire Spitfires (Hampshire)
- Neptune Finswimming Club (Bristol)
- Northern Lights Finswimming Club (Newcastle and North Tyneside)
- LondonFin Swimming and Finswimming Club (London)

== Competitions ==
=== Regional ===
Regional competition is offered by the BFA club system.

=== National ===
There is an annual National Short Course (25 m pool) Finswimming Championships in the United Kingdom, which are traditionally held at the Edenbridge Leisure Centre, Edenbridge, Kent in November. As of 2007, the annual National Long Course (50 m pool) Finswimming Championships have been held; the first being held in Aldershot, Hampshire.

=== International ===
British finswimmers compete at international level including events offered within Europe at both national and continental level, and events offered within the sporting framework associated with the Commonwealth of Nations.

Team:

Emily Priscott-18Years old

Charlotte Priscott-14Years old

Grace Dalton-16Years old

Olivia Heckford-16Years old

== See also ==
- List of British records in finswimming
- List of Commonwealth records in finswimming
