= Peppo (name) =

Peppo is both a given name and a surname. Notable people with the name include:

- Domingo Peppo (born 1958), Argentine politician
- Peppo Biscarini (born 1960), Italian-American swimmer
