= Texas Open (disambiguation) =

Texas Open may refer to:

- Valero Texas Open, a men's golf tournament on the PGA Tour
- Texas State Open, a men's golf tournament
- Texas Women's Open, a women's golf tournament
- Texas Tennis Open, a tennis tournament on the WTA tour, which started in 2011
- Texas Open Finswimming Invitational, a finswimming competition
- Texas Open (squash), an annual pro squash tournament
