= Neptune Finswimming Club =

Sports club in Bristol, England

Neptune Finswimming Club is a finswimming club based in Bristol, England. It is affiliated to the British Finswimming Association.

== History ==
The Neptune Finswimming Club was formed in June 2011. The very first session ran on 22 June 2011 in Thornbury Leisure Centre with just two people attending. As of March 2018, the club claims to be one of the largest finswimming club in the UK with over 30 members and providing sessions for children and adults.

== Competitions ==
Over the last several years, Neptune Finswimming Club took part in a number of national and international competitions. The club took the lead on organising national finswimming events in 2013–2019.

Participated and organised competitions:

- 23 March 2018 – 24 March 2018 – World Cup Round in Italy, Lignano Sabbiadoro (4 National Records)
- 16 March 2019 – Finswimming Gala Chester (Runners up, 11 National Records)
- 24 November 2018 – Short Course British Finswimming Championships London (Club winner, 3 National Records)
- 16 June 2018 – Long Course British Finswimming Championship Bath (Runners up, 2 National Records)
- 24 March 2018 – 25 March 2018 – World Cup Round in Italy, Lignano Sabbiadoro (3 National Records)
- 2 December 2017 – Short Course British Finswimming Championships London (Club winner, 3 National Records)
- 25 March 2017 – 26 March 2017 – World Cup Round in Italy, Lignano Sabbiadoro
- 4 March 2017 – Finswimming Gala, Bristol (Runners up, 2 National Records)
- 3 December 2016 – Short Course British Finswimming Championships London (Club winner, 1 National Record)
- 24 September 2016 – Long Course British Finswimming Championships Aldershot
- 30 April 2016 – Finswimming Gala, Bristol (Club winner)
- 5 December 2015 – British Open Finswimming Championships, London (Club winner)
- 29 November 2014 – 1st LondonFin Cup, London (1 National Record)
- 7 June 2014 – Finswimming Gala, Bristol
- 7 December 2013 – Finswimming Gala, Bristol
- 21 September 2013 – 22 September 2013 – Belgian Open Finswimming Championships, Nivelles (1 National Record)
- 2 April 2011 – As part of FinWorld club some of club members took part in BFA Short Course Championships, Edenbridge

== Achievements ==
As of April 2018, Neptune Finswimming Club members hold 16 National Records and many age group records in different events.

National records:

- Long course (50m pool)
  - 50m apnea men : 17.40 by Andrei Oleinik
  - 200m surface men : 1:49.09 by Andrei Oleinik
  - 50m bi-fins junior – boys : 22.91 by Anton Oleinik
  - 100m bi-fins junior – boys : 50.82 by Anton Oleinik
  - 200m bi-fins junior – boys : 1:57.36 by Anton Oleinik
- Short course (25m pool)
  - 50m bi-fins men: 21.65 by Daniel Weightman
  - 100m bi-fins men : 50.16 by Daniel Weightman
  - 200m bi-fins men : 1:53.91 by Daniel Weightman
  - 25m bi-fins junior – boys : 10.65 by Anton Oleinik
  - 50m bi-fins junior – boys : 23.13 by Anton Oleinik
  - 100m bi-fins junior – boys : 52.28 by Anton Oleinik
  - 200m bi-fins junior – boys : 02:02.25 by Anton Oleinik
  - 100m bi-fins women : 00:59.34 by Christine Howie
  - 200m bi-fins women : 02:07.81 by Christine Howie
  - 25m surface junior – girls : 10.84 by Jasmine Farrer
  - 200m surface junior – girls : 01:56.50 by Jasmine Farrer

== Allies ==
A part of other finswimming clubs, Neptune Finswimming Club has tight relationships with Bristol Freedivers club, providing coaching for finswimming technique to their members.
