= Finswimming in Australia =

Competitive watersport

Finswimming has been conducted in Australia since 1970 and is offered at venues in New South Wales, Tasmania and Victoria. National championships have been held since 1970 and Australia first competed at world championship level in 1990.

== History ==
Finswimming has been conducted in Australia since at least 1970 where it was first appeared as the ‘finning competition’ in the program of the Australian Skindiving Convention (now called the Australian Underwater Championships) held at Edithburgh in South Australia during December 1970.

== Domestic competition ==
As of September 2013, finswimming is conducted at venues in New South Wales, Tasmania and Victoria. National championships has been held since 1970. The national championships are held annually and as an event separate from the Australian Underwater Championships since the early 1990s.

== International competition ==
Australia was first represented at a world championship event by an individual male competitor, Les Proud, at the 5th World Championships in Rome during 1990. The first appearance by an Australian team was at the 6th World Championships held in Athens during 1992.

== Governance ==
The peak body is the Fin Swimming Commission (operating as Ozfin Inc.) of the Australian Underwater Federation (AUF). There are state commissions in New South Wales, Tasmania and Victoria.

Ozfin's operations are concerned with building participation levels, improvement of competition standards, offering national and international competition within Australia, developing national teams for international competition, supporting domestic competition via the provision of technical and promotional support, and the accreditation of coaches and officials.

As of September 2013, Ozfin only offers swimming pool races for surface swimming, bi-fins, apnoea finswimming and immersion finswimming with breathing apparatus. While Ozfin does not offer any long distance finswimming events, the AUF spearfishing commission does offer a series of openwater finswimming events held over distances between 200 and 500 metres as part of the Australian Underwater Championships.

Finswimming has a coaching stream as part of the AUF's coaching program in underwater sports with two levels accredited with the Australian Government's National Coaching Accreditation Scheme (NCAS).

== See also ==
- List of Commonwealth records in finswimming
