= African Finswimming Championships =

Sports championship

The African Finswimming Championships are the African championships in the sport of finswimming. It is organised by the CMAS Finswimming Commission.

== Championships ==
Number	Year	Host City	Host country	Dates	Nations	Swimmers	Events	1st Medal Table	2nd Medal Table	3rd Medal Table
1	2023	Sharm El-Sheikh	Egypt	1–6 November						
