= Texas Finswimming Association =

Official governing body for competitive and recreational finswimming in Texas

The Texas Finswimming Association (TFA) is the official governing body for competitive and recreational finswimming in Texas. The TFA consists of competitive teams, high schools, colleges, individual athletes, supporters, and others who are interested in advancing the sport of finswimming in the Lone Star State.

== Organization ==
The TFA is governed by a board of directors. Each board serves for the duration of the Olympiad, with the current board serving until December 31, 2028.

The board of directors for the current Olympiad (2024-2028) is as follows:

- President: Darla S. Kelly – Deer Park, Texas
- Vice president: Kristine Kelly – Deer Park, Texas
- Secretary: Donna Alicoate – Broadway, Virginia
- Treasurer: Chris Price - Pasadena, Texas
- Executive director: Robert H. Kelly – Deer Park, Texas
- Director of media and public relations: Chris Price – Pasadena, Texas
- Director of special programs: Taylor Hart – Houston, Texas
- Athlete representative: Kirstin Kelly – Pasadena, Texas

The executive committee of the board of directors of the Texas Finswimming Association consists of the positions of president, vice president, secretary, treasurer, and executive director. The executive director is the chairman of the executive committee. This committee has the task of formulating and establishing rule changes for the sport.

== Competitions ==
In addition, Texas has hosted the majority of the finswimming competitions in the US for the past 6–8 years. Texas hosts the Texas Open Finswimming Invitational, the Gulf Coast International Finswimming Invitational, along with the Texas State Finswimming Championships every year.

In addition TFA also host 2–3 high school finswimming meets a year for those schools who have finswimming as part of their official athletic program.

Finswimmers from Texas have competed in numerous national and international competitions over the years, including the 1998 USA Fin Swimming National Championships, 2000 CMAS World Finswimming Championships, 2001 World Scholar-Athlete Games, 2006 World Scholar-Athlete Games, 1999 United States Scholar-Athlete Games, 2003 United States Scholar-Athlete Games, 2008 United States Scholar-Athlete Games and the Gulf Coast International Finswimming Invitational.

== Competitive/performance suits ==
It was decided by the Executive Committee on October 1, 2009, that competitive performance suits would be allowed in all competitions in Texas. There shall be no restrictions on the type of suit worn in any recognized or sanctioned finswimming competition.

== Records ==
=== Short course yards ===
==== Men ====
The records listed are correct as of July 1, 2022. Updates will be made when official results are confirmed and ratified by the Texas Finswimming Association and its board of directors.

Event	Time	Name	Year	Location
Surface				
25 yards	00:09.84	Derrick Mauk	1998	Pasadena, TX, USA
50 yards	00:18.31	Derrick Mauk	1999	Pasadena, TX, USA
100 yards	00:43.08	Derrick Mauk	1999	Pasadena, TX, USA
200 yards	01:39.46	Derrick Mauk	1999	Pasadena, TX, USA
500 yards	04:57.81	Derrick Mauk	1999	Pasadena, TX, USA
1000 yards	12:46.03	Michael Parsons	2001	Pasadena, TX, USA
1650 yards	22:06.72	Michael Parsons	2001	Pasadena, TX, USA
Apnea				
25 yards	00:07.71	Derrick Mauk	1998	Pasadena, TX, USA
50 yards	00:16.94	Derrick Mauk	1999	Pasadena, TX, USA
Immersion				
50 yards	00:19.49	Derrick Mauk	1999	Pasadena, TX, USA
100 yards	00:45.36	Derrick Mauk	2000	Pasadena, TX, USA
200 yards	01:47.27	Derrick Mauk	1999	Pasadena, TX, USA
500 yards				
Relays				
4×50 yards surface				
4×100 yard surface	03:10.61	Brian Mauk, Robert Oehrlein, Michael Parsons, Derrick Mauk	1998	Pasadena, TX, USA
4×50 yards apnea				
4×50 yards immersion	02:01.88	Jose Arroyo, Robert Kelly, Brandon Bass, Joshua Bass	2002	Pasadena, TX, USA

==== Women ====
The records listed are correct as of July 1, 2022. Updates will be made when official results are confirmed and ratified by the Texas Finswimming Association and its board of directors.

Event	Time	Name	Year	Location
Surface				
25 yards	00:10:21	Kristine Kelly	2006	Pasadena, TX, USA
50 yards	00:20.59	Noora Kuusivouri	1998	Pasadena, TX, USA
100 yards	00:45.33	Noora Kuusivouri	1998	Pasadena, TX, USA
200 yards	01:42.01	Noora Kuusivouri	2000	Pasadena, TX, USA
500 yards	04:40.56	Noora Kuusivouri	2000	Pasadena, TX, USA
1000 yards	12:53.53	Kristine Kelly	1999	Pasadena, TX, USA
1650 yards	21:29.61	Kristine Kelly	1999	Pasadena, TX, USA
Apnea				
25 yards	00:09.52	Tiffany Davis	2000	Pasadena, TX, USA
50 yards	00:20.23	Kristine Kelly	2006	Kingston, RI, USA
Immersion				
50 yards	00:25.50	Kristine Kelly	1999	Pasadena, TX, USA
100 yards	00:47.94	Noora Kuusivouri	2000	Pasadena, TX, USA
200 yards	01:50.63	Noora Kuusivouri	2000	Pasadena, TX, USA
500 yards	06:47.96	Kristine Kelly	2000	Pasadena, TX, USA
Relays				
4×50 yards surface	01:37.07	Kristine Kelly, Clara Ho, Stacey Golden, Jeana Poteet	1999	Pasadena, TX, USA
4×100 yard surface	02:56.21	Kristine Kelly, Noora Kuusivouri, Stacey Golden, Jeana Poteet	1998	Pasadena, TX, USA
4×50 yards apnea				
4×50 yards immersion				

=== Long course meters ===
==== Men ====
The records listed are correct as of July 1, 2022. Updates will be made when official results are confirmed and ratified by the Texas Finswimming Association and its board of directors.

Event	Time	Name	Year	Location
Surface				
50 meters	00:21.65	Derrick Mauk	1998	Freemont, CA, USA
100 meters	00:51.70	Derrick Mauk	1998	Freemont, CA, USA
200 meters	02:03.18	Derrick Mauk	1998	Freemont, CA, USA
400 meters	04:47.53	Derrick Mauk	1998	Freemont, CA, USA
Apnea				
50 meters	00:19.71	Derrick Mauk	1998	Freemont, CA, USA
Immersion				
100 meters				
400 meters				
800 meters				

==== Women ====
The records listed are correct as of July 1, 2022. Updates will be made when official results are confirmed and ratified by the Texas Finswimming Association and its board of directors.

Event	Time	Name	Year	Location
Surface				
50 meters	00:24.20	Stacey Golden	1998	Freemont, CA, USA
100 meters	00:58.32	Kristine Kelly	2000	Palma de Majorca, Spain
200 meters	02:20.98	Stacey Golden	1998	Freemont, CA, USA
400 meters				
Apnea				
50 meters	00:22.03	Kristine Kelly	2000	Houston, TX, USA
Immersion				
100 meters	00:58.48	Kristine Kelly	2000	Palo Alto, CA, USA
400 meters	05:06.51	Kristine Kelly	2000	Palma de Majorca, Spain
800 meters	10:36.13	Kristine Kelly	2000	Palma de Majorca, Spain

== See also ==
- Monofin – Single blade swimfin attached to both feet
- List of United States records in finswimming
