= Texas Open Finswimming Invitational =

Open finswimming competition held in Texas since 1999

The Texas Open Finswimming Invitational is an open finswimming competition held in Texas since 1999. The event is sanctioned by the Texas Finswimming Association (TFA) and is open to all finswimmers who are registered competitors of the TFA and invited finswimmers from other states and countries. Events are contested for both males and females, with no distinction between the various age groups competing. The meet is conducted in an open format.

The meet has been hosted by the Finswimming Association of Southeast Texas, Sam Rayburn High School aquatics team and Pasadena High School aquatics team

The meet was first contested in 1999 and was not held from 2008 to 2010 due to weather and the lack of a suitable pool. The 2011 event was held at San Jacinto College and was contested with local high school finswimmers who had ties to local teams.

== Texas Open Finswimming Invitational Records ==
=== Short course yards ===
==== Men ====
The records listed are correct as of March 31, 2011.

Event	Time	Name	Team	Year
Surface				
25 yards	00:10.21	Robert Orehlein	Deer Park Finswimmers	1999
50 yards	00:18.86	Derrick Mauk	Finswimming Association of Southeast Texas	1999
100 yards	00:44.33	Derrick Mauk	Finswimming Association of Southeast Texas	1999
200 yards	01:45.72	Derrick Mauk	Finswimming Association of Southeast Texas	1999
Apnea				
25 yards	00:08.31	Nicholas Holloway	Texan Finswimming Club	2011
50 yards	00:19.75	Brian Mauk	Deer Park Finswimmers	1999

==== Women ====
Event	Time	Name	Team	Year
Surface				
25 yards	00:11.01	Stacey Golden	Finswimming Association of Southeast Texas	1999
50 yards	00:23.58	Tiffany Davis	Eagle Finswimming Club	2000
100 yards	00:50.31	Kristine Kelly	Finswimming Association of Southeast Texas	2006
200 yards	01:56.61	Kristine Kelly	Finswimming Association of Southeast Texas	2006
Apnea				
25 yards	00:09.52	Tiffany Davis	Eagle Finswimming Club	2000
50 yards	00:20.24	Kristine Kelly	Finswimming Association of Southeast Texas	2006

== See also ==
- Finswimming in the United States – Competitive watersport
- Monofin – Single blade swimfin attached to both feet
