= Joel Armas =

Cuban finswimmer (born 1973)

Personal information
- Born: September 24, 1973 (age 52) Santa Cruz del Norte, Cuba

Sport
- Sport: Swimming

Joel Armas y Hernandez (born September 24, 1973 in Santa Cruz del Norte, Cuba) is the U.S. record holder in finswimming.

Armas is the son of Ceren Armas and Maria Hernandez. His father, an athlete who once trained for the Cuban national basketball, successfully left Cuba on boat in 1979. A few months later, he and his mother (a teacher), unsuccessfully tried to leave Cuba. His mother lost her job and he was ostracized at school.

He later swam competitively at school meets. When he was 8 years old when he won the 25-meter backstroke at a regional competition. When he was 10 years old he was sent to train at the Cuban National Aquatic School in Havana. In 1990, he joined the national team to train for the 1992 Olympics in Barcelona, Spain. He later dropped out of the national team when he was told he would not be allowed to leave the country to compete. On August 21, 1994, he got on a raft and left Cuba. After 14 hours at sea he was picked up by the U.S. Coast Guard and taken to the U.S. Naval Base in Guantanamo. He remained there for 18 months.

In 1996, Armas worked as a lifeguard and played baseball for Miami-Dade Community College. He later studied at Florida Memorial College and at Florida International University. In 2002, he appeared on the TV show Sabado Gigante on Univision and won a Ford Focus. He then became a firefighter-paramedic for the Broward County Sheriff’s Department. He later met Cayetano Garcia (1958- ), the U.S. monofin champ, who gave him his first monofin and later coached him.

He placed 17th in his first world competition at the 2nd CMAS World Cup in Ravenna, Italy and broke Mr. Garcia’s U.S. finswimming record. In 2007, he placed 9th in Hungary at the Finswimming World Cup.

== See also ==
- List of United States records in finswimming
- List of Cubans
- Finswimming in the United States – Competitive watersport
