= List of British records in finswimming =

Below is the list of current British records in finswimming. The records are ratified by the British Finswimming Association.

This list echoes that found on the Monofin website. These records are correct as of 1 April 2018.

In December 2017 British Finswimming Association made a decision to maintain the National records separately for adults and juniors in line with CMAS regulations.

== Long course metres ==
=== Men ===
The records listed are correct as of 1 December 2019.

| Event | Time | Name | Team | Year | Location |
|---|---|---|---|---|---|
| Surface | | | | | |
| 50 m | 00:20.87 | Alaric Smith | Five Oak Green Hoppers SC | 2007 | (Belgium) Antwerp |
| 100 m | 00:45.04 | Dezso Laszlo | LondonFin | 2019 | (Italy) Ravenna |
| 200 m | 01:43.64 | Dezso Laszlo | LondonFin | 2019 | (Italy) Ravenna |
| 400 m | 03:45.45 | Dezso Laszlo | LondonFin | 2019 | (Italy) Ravenna |
| 800 m | 08:40.32 | Simon Kidd | Hampshire Spitfires FC | 2009 | (Netherlands) Eindhoven |
| 1500 m | 16:57.70 | Simon Kidd | Hampshire Spitfires FC | 2009 | (Netherlands) Eindhoven |
| Stereofins | | | | | |
| 50 m | 00:21.55 | George Hopkinson | Swansea University F&FC | 2007 | (Wales) Swansea |
| 100 m | 00:49.22 | Daniel Weightman | Northern Lights Finswimming Club | 2016 | (United Kingdom) Aldershot |
| 200 m | 01:57.83 | Daniel Weightman | Northern Lights Finswimming Club | 2016 | (United Kingdom) Aldershot |
| Apnea | | | | | |
| 50 m | 00:17.40 | Andrei Oleinik | Neptune Finswimming Club | 2013 | (United Kingdom) Bristol |
| Immersion | | | | | |
| 100 m | 00:40.89 | Alaric Smith | Five Oak Green Hoppers SC | 2007 | (Belgium) Antwerp |
| 400 m | 03:50.00 | Alaric Smith | Five Oak Green Hoppers SC | 2003 | (Sweden) Västerås |
| 800 m | 08:54.12 | Alaric Smith | Five Oak Green Hoppers SC | 2007 | (Wales) Swansea |
| Relays | | | | | |
| 4×50 m Surface | 01:48.53 | Hampshire Spitfires FC | | 2007 | (United Kingdom) Aldershot |
| 4 × 100 m Surface | 03:29.43 | Great Britain | GBR Team | 2009 | (Netherlands) Eindhoven |
| 4 × 200 m Surface | 07:57.32 | Great Britain | GBR Team | 2007 | (Belgium) Antwerp |
| 4 × 100 m Stereofins | 03:39.42 | Anton Oleinik, Alex Cox, Richard Turley, Conor Boden | Neptune Finswimming Club | 2019 | (United Kingdom) Bath |

=== Junior - Boys ===
The records listed are correct as of 1 December 2019

| Event | Time | Name | Team | Year | Location |
|---|---|---|---|---|---|
| Apnea | | | | | |
| 50 m | 00:19.09 | James Dring | ASKA | 2018 | (United Kingdom) Bath |
| Surface | | | | | |
| 50 m | 00:20.13 | Leo Vinogradov | Northern Lights Finswimming Club | 2019 | (Italy) Lignano Sabbiadoro |
| 100 m | 00:46.02 | Leo Vinogradov | Northern Lights Finswimming Club | 2019 | (Italy) Lignano Sabbiadoro |
| 200 m | 02:12.91 | Andrew Turner | Kent Juniors FC | 2009 | (Netherlands) Eindhoven |
| 400 m | 04:51.97 | Andrew Turner | Kent Juniors FC | 2009 | (Netherlands) Eindhoven |
| Stereofins | | | | | |
| 50 m | 00:22.53 | Anton Oleinik | Neptune Finswimming Club | 2019 | (United Kingdom) Bath |
| 100 m | 00:50.33 | Anton Oleinik | Neptune Finswimming Club | 2019 | (United Kingdom) Bath |
| 200 m | 01:53.35 | Anton Oleinik | Neptune Finswimming Club | 2019 | (United Kingdom) Bath |
| 400 m | 04:24.40 | Anton Oleinik | Neptune Finswimming Club | 2019 | (United Kingdom) Bath |
| Relays | | | | | |
| 4 × 100 m Stereofins | 07:03.44 | Oliver Laszlo, Ava Bjorkenstam, Jasper Cox, Samuel Cox | LondonFin | 2019 | (United Kingdom) Bath |

=== Women ===
The records listed are correct as of 19 June 2018

| Event | Time | Name | Team | Year | Location |
|---|---|---|---|---|---|
| Surface | | | | | |
| 50 m | 00:23.76 | Harriet Pierce | Hampshire Spitfires FC | 2008 | (Netherlands) Utrecht |
| 100 m | 00:53.70 | Harriet Pierce | Hampshire Spitfires FC | 2008 | (Netherlands) Utrecht |
| 200 m | 02:37.62 | Emma Fielding | FinWorld Finswimming Club | 2016 | (United Kingdom) Aldershot |
| 400 m | 05:50.38 | Kate Goodwin | NoTanx | 2016 | (United Kingdom) Aldershot |
| Stereofins | | | | | |
| 50 m | 00:25.36 | Lucy Hawley | Kingston Royals Swimming Club | 2018 | (Italy) Lignano Sabbiadoro |
| 100 m | 00:55.55 | Lucy Hawley | Kingston Royals Swimming Club | 2018 | (Italy) Lignano Sabbiadoro |
| 200 m | 02:01.39 | Lucy Hawley | Kingston Royals Swimming Club | 2018 | (Italy) Lignano Sabbiadoro |
| Apnea | | | | | |
| 50 m | 00:21.72 | Harriet Pierce | Hampshire Spitfires FC | 2006 | (United Kingdom) Aldershot |
| Immersion | | | | | |
| 100 m | 01:03.94 | Sian Clement | Swansea Dragons Finswimming Club | 2007 | (Wales) Swansea |
| Relays | | | | | |
| 4×50 m Surface | 01:57.13 | Kent Juniors FC | | 2007 | (United Kingdom) Aldershot |
| 4 × 100 m Surface | 03:59.22 | Great Britain | GBR Team | 2000 | (Spain) Palma de Majorca |
| 4 × 200 m Surface | 11:09.30 | Kent Junior FC | | 2008 | (Netherlands) Eindhoven |
| 4 × 100 m Stereofins | 04:01.65 | Martha Partridge, Jasmine Farrer, Grace O'Brien, Zena Yfimcev | Neptune Finswimming Club | 2018 | (United Kingdom) Bath |

=== Junior - Girls ===
The records listed are correct as of 1 April 2019.

| Event | Time | Name | Team | Year | Location |
|---|---|---|---|---|---|
| Surface | | | | | |
| 50 m | 00:20.94 | Grace O'Brien | Neptune Finswimming Club | 2019 | (Italy) Lignano Sabbiadoro |
| 100 m | 00:49.07 | Grace O'Brien | Neptune Finswimming Club | 2019 | (Italy) Lignano Sabbiadoro |
| 200 m | 01:53.88 | Cassandra Graikowski Hainsworth | Five Oak Green Hoppers SC | 2010 | (Spain) Barcelona |
| 400 m | 04:02.55 | Cassandra Graikowski Hainsworth | Five Oak Green Hoppers SC | 2010 | (Spain) Palma de Majorca |
| 800 m | 10:00.89 | Samantha Davies | Kent Juniors FC | 2007 | (Germany) Rostock |
| 1500 m | 17:37.14 | Cassandra Graikowski Hainsworth | Five Oak Green Hoppers SC | 2010 | (Spain) Puerto de Cruz |
| Stereofins | | | | | |
| 50 m | 00:25.03 | Grace O'Brien | Neptune Finswimming Club | 2018 | (United Kingdom) Bath |
| 100 m | 00:56.22 | Zena Yfimcev | Neptune Finswimming Club | 2019 | (Italy) Lignano Sabbiadoro |
| 200 m | 02:06.55 | Zena Yfimcev | Neptune Finswimming Club | 2019 | (Italy) Lignano Sabbiadoro |
| Apnea | | | | | |
| 50 m | 00:20.12 | Cassandra Graikowski Hainsworth | Five Oak Green Hoppers SC | 2010 | (Spain) Puerto de Cruz |
| Immersion | | | | | |
| 100 m | 00:57.30 | Harriet Pierce | Hampshire Spitfires FC | 2003 | (Czech Republic) Liberec |
| 400 m | 05:57.00 | Katie Darby | Kent Juniors FC | 2010 | (Belgium) Genk |
| 800 m | 13:44.70 | Katie Darby | Kent Juniors FC | 2010 | (Netherlands) Eindhoven |
| Relays | | | | | |
| 4 × 100 m Surface | 05:03.93 | Lucy Naylor, Alexandra Owen-Hatfield, Ffion Shepard, Sophie Aylott | ASKA | 2018 | (United Kingdom) Bath |
| 4 × 100 m Stereofins | 04:54.25 | Lucy Naylor, Alexandra Owen-Hatfield, Francesca Owen-Hatfield, Sophie Aylott | ASKA | 2018 | (United Kingdom) Bath |

== Short course metres ==
=== Men ===
The records listed are correct as of 1 April 2019.

| Event | Time | Name | Team | Year | Location |
|---|---|---|---|---|---|
| Surface | | | | | |
| 25 m | 00:08.58 | Alastair Smith | Swansea University F&FC | 2008 | (United Kingdom) Edenbridge |
| 50 m | 00:20.02 | Deszo Lazslo | LondonFin | 2019 | (United Kingdom) Chester |
| 100 m | 00:45.25 | Deszo Lazslo | LondonFin | 2019 | (United Kingdom) Chester |
| 200 m | 01:45.25 | Deszo Lazslo | LondonFin | 2019 | (United Kingdom) Chester |
| 400 m | 03:49.79 | Alaric Smith | Five Oak Green Hoppers SC | 2006 | (United Kingdom) Swansea |
| 800 m | 09:09.75 | Alaric Smith | Five Oak Green Hoppers SC | 2004 | (United Kingdom) Southampton |
| 1500 m | 17:38.46 | Alaric Smith | Five Oak Green Hoppers SC | 2004 | (United Kingdom) Southampton |
| Stereofins | | | | | |
| 25 m | 00:09.84 | Daniel Weightman | Northern Lights Finswimming Club | 2015 | (United Kingdom) London |
| 50 m | 00:21.65 | Daniel Weightman | Neptune Finswimming Club | 2017 | (United Kingdom) Bristol |
| 100 m | 00:50.16 | Daniel Weightman | Neptune Finswimming Club | 2016 | (United Kingdom) London |
| 200 m | 01:53.91 | Daniel Weightman | Neptune Finswimming Club | 2017 | (United Kingdom) London |
| Apnea | | | | | |
| 25 m | 00:06.57 | Alaric Smith | Five Oak Green Hoppers SC | 2010 | (United Kingdom) Tonbridge |
| 50 m | 00:17.98 | Alaric Smith | Five Oak Green Hoppers SC | 2002 | (United Kingdom) Swansea |
| Immersion | | | | | |
| 100 m | 00:45.43 | Alaric Smith | Five Oak Green Hoppers SC | 2007 | (United Kingdom) Edenbridge |
| 400 m | No Time | | | | |
| 800 m | 08:15.11 | Alaric Smith | Tonbridge FC | 2000 | (United Kingdom) Gillingham |
| Relays | | | | | |
| 4×50 m Surface | 01:31.07 | Swansea University F&FC | | 2008 | (United Kingdom) Edenbridge |
| 4 × 100 m Surface | 03:25.22 | England Team | | 2006 | (United Kingdom) Edenbridge |
| 4×50 m Stereofins | 01:42.37 | Garry Checksfield, William Harper, Andrei Oleinik, Anton Oleinik | Neptune Finswimming Club | 2019 | (United Kingdom) Chester |

=== Junior - Boys ===
The records listed are correct as of 15 December 2017.

| Event | Time | Name | Team | Year | Location |
|---|---|---|---|---|---|
| Surface | | | | | |
| 25 m | 00:10.53 | Leo Vinogradov | Northern Lights Finswimming Club | 2017 | (United Kingdom) London |
| 50 m | 00:21.74 | Leo Vinogradov | Northern Lights Finswimming Club | 2019 | (United Kingdom) Chester |
| 100 m | 00:49.01 | Leo Vinogradov | Northern Lights Finswimming Club | 2019 | (United Kingdom) Chester |
| 200 m | 02:03.88 | Leo Vinogradov | Northern Lights Finswimming Club | 2018 | (United Kingdom) London |
| 400 m | 06:06.19 | Andrew Turner | Kent Juniors FC | 2005 | (United Kingdom) Edenbridge |
| Stereofins | | | | | |
| 25 m | 00:10.44 | Anton Oleinik | Neptune Finswimming Club | 2019 | (United Kingdom) Chester |
| 50 m | 00:22.79 | Anton Oleinik | Neptune Finswimming Club | 2019 | (United Kingdom) Chester |
| 100 m | 00:50.60 | Anton Oleinik | Neptune Finswimming Club | 2019 | (United Kingdom) Chester |
| 200 m | 01:55.24 | Anton Oleinik | Neptune Finswimming Club | 2019 | (United Kingdom) Chester |
| Apnea | | | | | |
| 25 m | 00:09.82 | Leo Vinogradov | Northern Lights Finswimming Club | 2017 | (United Kingdom) London |
| 50 m | 00:21.14 | James Dring | ASKA | 2018 | (United Kingdom) London |
| Immersion | | | | | |
| 100 m | 01:15.44 | Theodore Anderson-Knight | Kent Juniors FC | 2009 | (United Kingdom) Edenbridge |
| Relays | | | | | |
| 4x50 m Stereofins | 01:49.92 | Victoria Symes, Lucy Naylor, Harrison Dring, James Dring | ASKA | 2018 | (United Kingdom) London |

=== Women ===
The records listed are correct as of 1 April 2019.

| Event | Time | Name | Team | Year | Location |
|---|---|---|---|---|---|
| Surface | | | | | |
| 25 m | 00:10.96 | Michelle Hadden | Tonbridge FC | 2001 | (Hungary) Eger |
| 50 m | 00:24.58 | Toni Stevens | Tonbridge FC | 2001 | (United Kingdom) Tonbridge |
| 100 m | 00:56.97 | Michelle Hadden | Tonbridge FC | 2002 | (United Kingdom) Edenbridge |
| 200 m | 02:14.78 | Peggy Osterman | Northern Lights Finswimming Club | 2018 | (United Kingdom) London |
| 400 m | 04:27.51 | Harriet Pierce | Hampshire Spitfires FC | 2005 | (United Kingdom) Southampton |
| 800 m | 09:35.22 | Harriet Pierce | Hampshire Spitfires FC | 2005 | (United Kingdom) Southampton |
| 1500 m | 18:59.61 | Harriet Pierce | Hampshire Spitfires FC | 2004 | (United Kingdom) Southampton |
| Stereofins | | | | | |
| 25 m | 00:11.91 | Martha Partridge | Neptune Finswimming Club | 2019 | (United Kingdom) Chester |
| 50 m | 00:26.55 | Martha Partridge | Neptune Finswimming Club | 2019 | (United Kingdom) Chester |
| 100 m | 00:57.73 | Martha Partridge | Neptune Finswimming Club | 2019 | (United Kingdom) Chester |
| 200 m | 02:07.19 | Martha Partridge | Neptune Finswimming Club | 2019 | (United Kingdom) Chester |
| Apnea | | | | | |
| 25 m | 00:09.85 | Michelle Hadden | Tonbridge FC | 2001 | (Hungary) Eger |
| 50 m | 00:26.11 | Jess Smith | Swansea University F&FC | 2009 | (United Kingdom) Edenbridge |
| Immersion | | | | | |
| 100 m | 01:16.75 | Christine Turner | Tonbridge FC | 2002 | (Wales) Swansea |
| 400 m | 06:07.49 | Katie Darby | Kent Juniors FC | 2011 | (United Kingdom) Edenbridge |
| 800 m | No Time | | | | |
| Relays | | | | | |
| 4×50 m Surface | 01:51.99 | Swansea University F&FC | | 2009 | (United Kingdom) Edenbridge |
| 4 × 100 m Surface | 04:10.70 | Swansea University F&FC | | 2009 | (United Kingdom) Edenbridge |
| 4×50 m Stereofins | 01:56.28 | Maddie Nicholson, Victoria Symes, Hannah Hutchinson, Sophie Axford | ASKA | 2017 | (United Kingdom) London |

=== Junior - Girls ===
The records listed are correct as of 1 April 2019.

| Event | Time | Name | Team | Year | Location |
|---|---|---|---|---|---|
| Surface | | | | | |
| 25 m | 00:10.84 | Jasmine Farrer | Neptune Finswimming Club | 2017 | (United Kingdom) London |
| 50 m | 00:21.65 | Grace O'Brien | Neptune Finswimming Club | 2019 | (Spain) Chester |
| 100 m | 00:48.67 | Cassandra Graikowski Hainsworth | Five Oak Green Hoppers SC | 2011 | (United Kingdom) Edenbridge |
| 200 m | 01:56.00 | Jasmine Farrer | Neptune Finswimming Club | 2018 | (United Kingdom) London |
| 400 m | 04:41.07 | Olivia Pierce | Hampshire Spitfires FC | 2004 | (United Kingdom) Southampton |
| 800 m | 09:40.99 | Harriet Pierce | Hampshire Spitfires FC | 2004 | (United Kingdom) Shirley |
| Stereofins | | | | | |
| 25 m | 00:11.09 | Lucy Hawley | Kingston Royals SC | 2017 | (United Kingdom) London |
| 50 m | 00:24.34 | Lucy Hawley | Kingston Royals SC | 2017 | (United Kingdom) London |
| 100 m | 00:52.81 | Lucy Hawley | Kingston Royals SC | 2017 | (United Kingdom) London |
| 200 m | 01:59.40 | Lucy Hawley | Kingston Royals SC | 2017 | (United Kingdom) London |
| Apnea | | | | | |
| 25 m | 00:08.65 | Grace O'Brien | Neptune Finswimming Club | 2018 | (United Kingdom) London |
| 50 m | 00:21.00 | Cassandra Graikowski Hainsworth | Five Oak Green Hoppers SC | 2010 | (Spain) Tenerife |
| Immersion | | | | | |
| 100 m | 01:11.99 | Beth Fraser | Kent Juniors FC | 2008 | (United Kingdom) Edenbridge |
| 400 m | 06:11.59 | Katie Darby | Kent Juniors FC | 2009 | (United Kingdom) Edenbridge |
| Relays | | | | | |
| 4x50 m Surface | 01:55.65 | Hannah Hutchinson, Victoria Symes, Kirsty Cowell, Lucy Naylor | ASKA | 2019 | (United Kingdom) Chester |
| 4x50 m Stereofins | 01:43.64 | Jasmine Farrer, Olivia West, Zena Yfimcev, Grace O'Brien | Neptune Finswimming Club | 2019 | (United Kingdom) Chester |
| 4 × 100 m Stereofins | 06:07.81 | Rada Grebenyuk, Alesya Stevens, Aurelia Mitchell, Anya Oleinik | Neptune Finswimming Club | 2018 | (United Kingdom) Bristol |

== Notes ==
Other notes on these records will be put here when they arise.

== References and external links ==
- British finswimming association
- Neptune Finswimming Club (Bristol)
- Monofin: Finswimming in the UK
- Age group records in Finswimming
