= Finswimming =

Competitive watersport using swimfins for propulsion

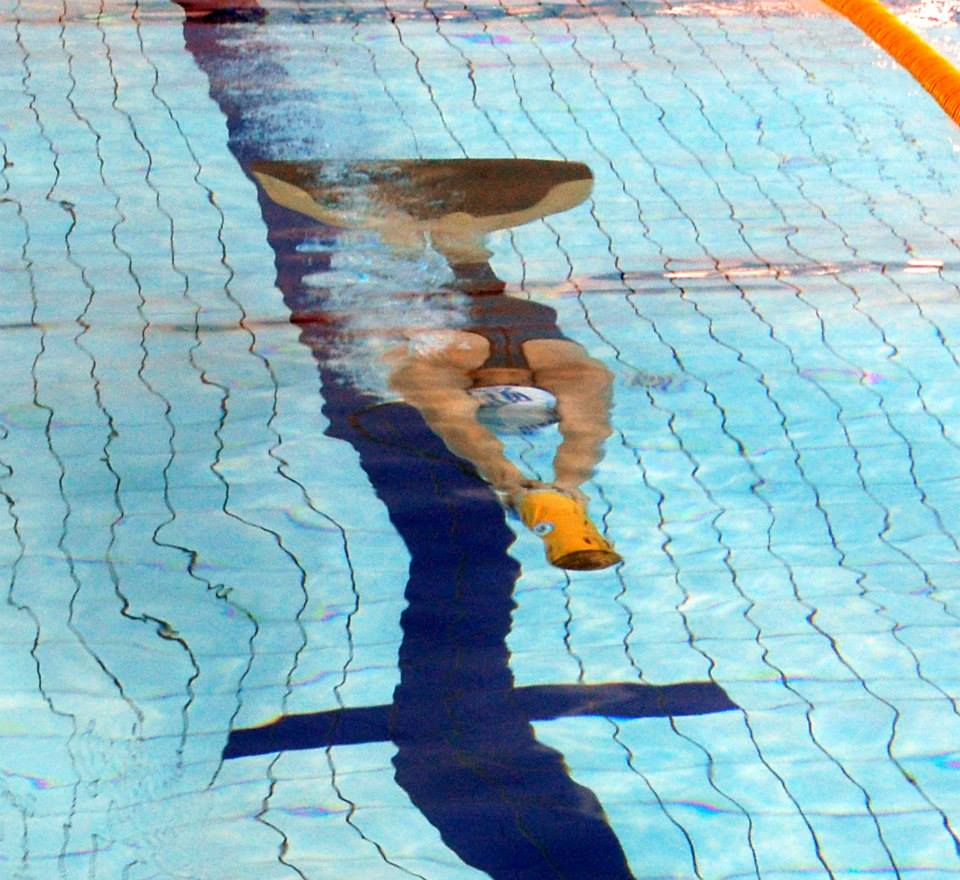
- Finswimming with monofin
- Highest governing body: CMAS

Characteristics
- Contact: no
- Mixed-sex: Yes, but usually in separate events
- Type: Aquatic, indoor, outdoor
- Equipment: diving mask, snorkel, fins, open circuit scuba set
- Venue: swimming pool, open water

Presence
- Country or region: International
- Olympic: No
- World Games: 1981 – present

Finswimming is an underwater sport consisting of four techniques involving swimming with the use of fins either on the water's surface using a snorkel with either monofins or bifins or underwater with monofin either by holding one's breath or using open circuit scuba diving equipment. Events exist over distances similar to swimming competitions for both swimming pool and open water venues. Competition at world and continental level is organised by the Confédération Mondiale des Activités Subaquatiques (CMAS, World Underwater Federation). The sport's first world championship was held in 1976. It also has been featured at the World Games as a trend sport since 1981 and was demonstrated at the 2015 European Games in June 2015.

== Rules and description of the sport ==
Competitors are described within the International Rules as 'swimmers' rather than as finswimmers or divers.

=== Classes of competition ===
Competition is divided into two classes: swimming pool and long distance (also called open water).

A swimming pool must be 50 m long by 21 m wide and 1.8 m deep, i.e. an Olympic-size swimming pool (also known as a long course pool) is suitable for the holding of swimming races for either the Olympic Games and a FINA world championships. The International Rules do not permit the use of 25m length pools (known as short course) although these are used in regional and national competition.

Long distance sites include both the sea and natural water bodies such as freshwater rivers and lakes. Site selection criteria include 'low current and tides' and water quality 'appropriate for swimming' as certified by a local authority. The site, when in use for competition, will be marked by buoys, patrolled by safety boats and will have observation points (or additional boats) for judges to oversee any turns present in the course.

=== Techniques ===
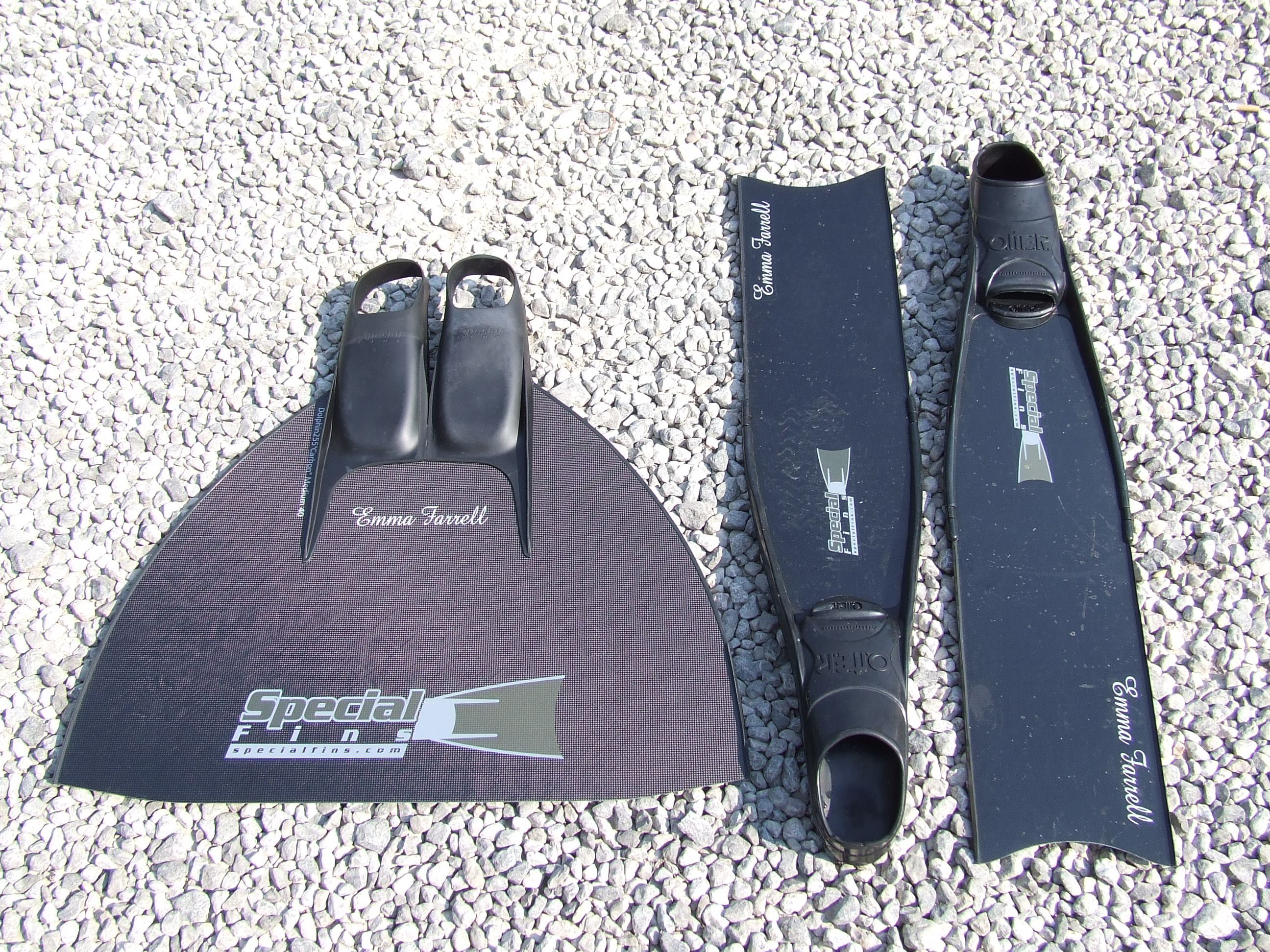
Monofin & Bi-fins

==== Surface finswimming ====
Surface finswimming (also known by its acronym, SF) is swimming on the surface of the water using mask, snorkel, and monofins. SF races are held for distances of 50, 100, 200, 400, 800, 1500, 4 × 50 mix relays (2 men's, 2 women's), 4 × 100 relays and 4 × 200 relays (meters) in swimming pools and over various long distances in the open water environment. Swimmers must remain on the surface of the water at all times for the duration of the race except when starting or make a turns at the end of a swimming pool where an immersion over a distance of 15m is permitted.

==== Apnoea finswimming ====
Apnoea finswimming (also known by its acronym, AP, and as apnoea or apnea) is underwater swimming in a swimming pool using a mask, monofin and holding one's breath. AP races are held for the distance of 50m. A swimmer's face must be immersed for the duration of the race otherwise he/she risks disqualification. AP races are not conducted in open water for 'safety and security reasons'.

==== Immersion finswimming with breathing apparatus ====
Immersion finswimming with breathing apparatus (also known by its acronym, IM, immersion, and scuba finswimming), is underwater swimming using mask, monofin and underwater breathing apparatus (open-circuit air scuba) conducted in a swimming pool. While there are no requirements on how a breathing apparatus is carried, it cannot be exchanged or abandoned during a race. IM races are held for distances of 100, 200 and 400 m. A swimmer's face must be immersed for the duration of the race or risk disqualification. IM races are not conducted in open water for 'safety and security reasons'. Historically, IM swims were conducted in open water up to distances of 1000m.

==== Bi-fins ====
Bi-fins (also known by its acronym, BF or as 'stereo-fins') is swimming on the surface of the water with mask, snorkel and a pair of fins using a crawl style. BF races are held for distances of 50, 100, 200, 400 and 4 × 100 mix relays (2 men's, 2 women's) in swimming pools and over various long distances in the open water environment such as 4 km and 6 km. It is reported that BF was introduced in 2006 to provide the opportunity for competition by swimmers who cannot afford to purchase a set of monofins. Swimmers must remain on the surface of the water at all times for the duration of the race except when starting or make a turns at the end of a swimming pool where an immersion of a distance of 15m is permitted.

=== Equipment ===
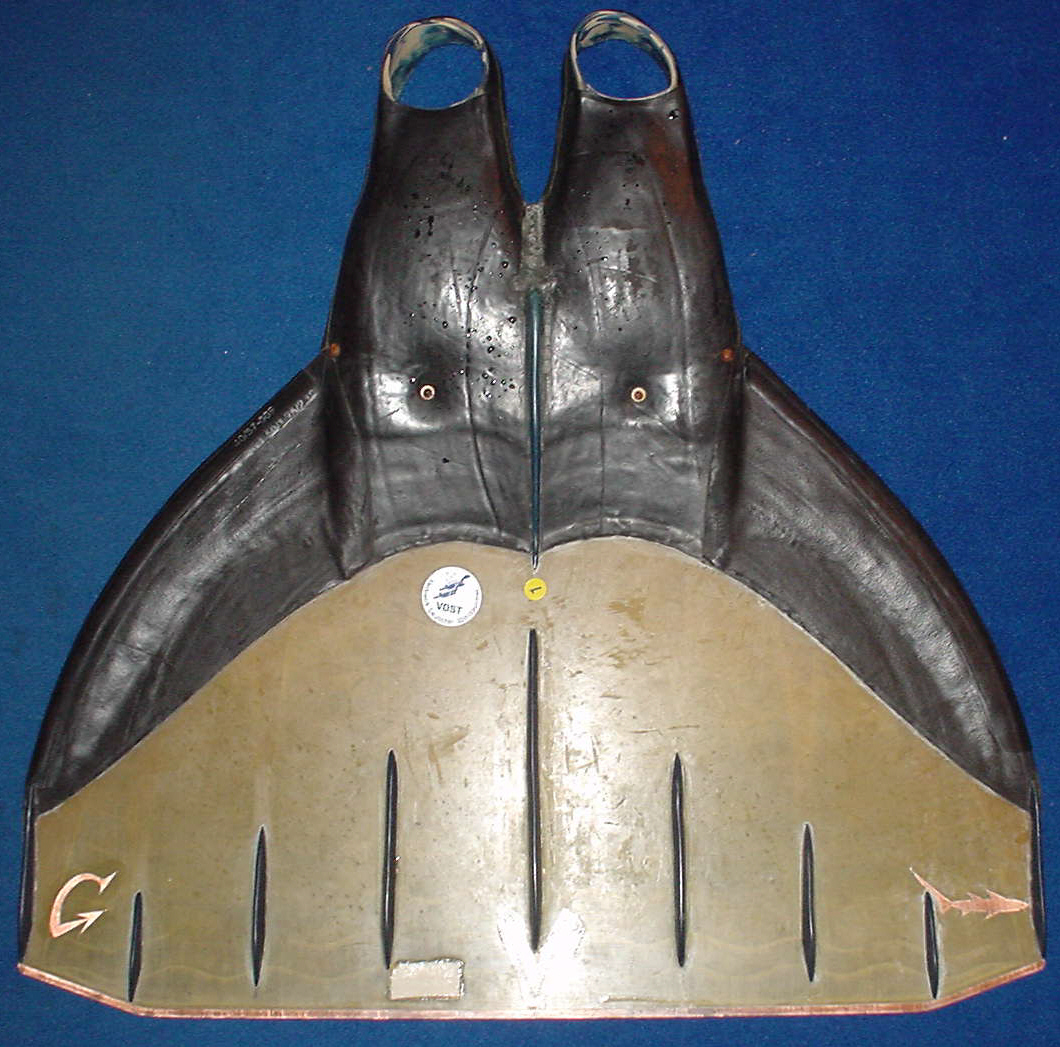
Monofin

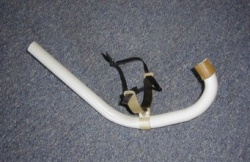
Finswimming snorkel

Finswimming which is often compared to sports swimming differs from that sport in the use of masks, fins, snorkels and underwater breathing apparatus. This reflects the sport's origins in the underwater diving techniques of snorkelling, breath-hold diving and open circuit scuba diving.

Apart from requiring the use of a mask for protection of the eyes and for the ability to see underwater, the international rules have no requirements regarding mask selection. Centre-mounted snorkels (also known as front snorkels) are the only type approved for use subject to meeting minimum and maximum requirements in tube length and internal diameter. Fins are also regulated by international rules. Monofins have a maximum size which can be checked by the use of a template while bi-fins must be one of the brands certified (i.e. homologated) by CMAS.

Underwater breathing apparatus is restricted to open circuit scuba using compressed atmospheric air as the breathing gas. The use of oxygen enriched mixtures is forbidden. Cylinders are limited by maximum cylinder pressure rating of 200 bar and a minimum cylinder capacity of 0.4 litres. While there are no requirements for regulators, swimmers appear to be free to modify these to remove any unnecessary parts.

Garments such as swimsuits, swim caps and wetsuits, and the use of logos printed on these garments and the equipment is also subject to the requirements of the international rules.

=== Age groupings and associated restrictions ===
The following age groupings and associated restrictions for both men and women are mandated by the International Rules.

Age group title	Age group code	Age range	Restrictions
Senior	A	18 years & over	No restrictions
Junior	B	16–18 years	No restrictions
Junior	C	14–16 years	Maximum openwater swim of 8 km
Junior	D	12–14 years	Maximum openwater swim of 6 km Maximum AP distance of 25m
Junior	E	less than 12 years	Known as the 'pre-competition group'; national rules apply for this age group as there is no international competition for this group.
Master	V0	25–35 years	No restrictions
Master	V1	35–45 years	No restrictions
Master	V2	45–55 years	No restrictions
Master	V3	55–65 years	No restrictions
Master	V4	65–75 years	No restrictions
Master	V5	+75 years	No restrictions

== Origins and history ==
The sport developed in Europe following the ready availability of the first rubber fins during the 1930s. Luigi Ferraro, Italian diving pioneer, is reported as organising the first fin-swimming competition in the sea during 1951 followed by a 100 kilometres (62 miles) ocean swim in 1955. The first competition in the Soviet Union was held during 1958.

The first European Championship which was a multi sport event involving both finswimming and underwater orienteering was held under the title of the First European Championship of Subaquatics Technical at Angera, Italy in August 1967. The specific finswimming events were races over the distances of 40m and 1000m which are reported as using either surface swimming techniques or respectively apnoea and immersion techniques. In 1969, the first European Finswimming Championship to be separate of underwater orienteering was held in Locarno, Switzerland.

The first World Championships were held in Hanover, Germany during 1976 followed by the inclusion of the sport in the inaugural World Games in Santa Clara, California, USA during 1981. In 1988, the first World Long Distance Championship was held in Paris, France followed in 1989 by the first World Junior Championship in Dunaújváros, Hungary.

The arrival of the monofin in the early 1970s led to the breaking of all world records by the end of the decade due to the improved performance possible when used in lieu of bi-fins.

In 2007, the first Bi Fin races using CMAS homologated fins were held.

== Sporting appeal and training ==
=== Appeal ===
The main appeal of finswimming is reported by some as being the speed that a swimmer can reach. The world record for the men's 50 m freestyle (long course) in sports swimming (see World records in swimming) is 20.88 seconds (by Cameron McEvoy of Australia). In finswimming, it is 13.70 seconds (for 50 m apnoea by Pavel Kabanov of Russia) (see World records in finswimming). This is a 50% increase in speed over sports swimming.

One of the great appeals of finswimming is that finswimmers do not need to be good sports swimmers. Indeed, there is some evidence that top flight sports swimmers may make poorer finswimmers than well-trained finswimmers (see below).

=== Training ===
Unlike most sports swimming training programmes, finswimming training tends to be far more specific and more like systems used for track running in athletics. In addition, finswimming training tends to have more dry-side work, including a huge amount of core stability (as core strength), plyometrics and weight training. Elite finswimmers emphasize mental preparation and technical precision over volume-based training, with competition schedules requiring peak performance maintenance across 4–6 month seasons.

It has been recorded that sports swimmers tend to approach finswimming with preconceptions on technique, which can limit their success.

== Governing body ==
The governing body is the CMAS Finswimming Commission.

Its role includes the upgrading of the rules of competition when required, keeping of records for CMAS championships, the World Games and these of national federations where these match or exceed records achieved at international level, and the maintenance of the CMAS World Ranking which is a listing of the best performing senior and junior men and women from both the most recent Finswimming World Championships and the rounds of the World Cup. It also assists the CMAS Board of Directors and others organising competitions organised under the auspices of CMAS.

As of June 2015, national federations in the following countries and territories have affiliated with the commission: Algeria, Argentina, Armenia, Austria, Australia, Belgium, Belarus, Canada, Cameroon, Cape Verde, Chile, Colombia, Cuba, China, Croatia, Cyprus, Czech Republic, Denmark, Ecuador, Egypt, Estonia, Finland, France, Germany, Great Britain, Greece, Hungary, Hong Kong, Indonesia, Italy, Japan, Jordan, Kazakhstan, Kenya, Korea, Kuwait, Kyrgyz Republic, Lebanon, Luxembourg, Libya, Mexico, Marianas, Montenegro, Netherlands, Palestine, Peru, Philippines, San Marino, Saudi Arabia, Serbia, Singapore, Slovakia, Slovenia, Spain, Switzerland, Syria, Russia, Tunisia, Turkey, Taiwan, Thailand, United Arab Emirates, United States of America, Venezuela and Vietnam.

== Competition at international level ==
=== CMAS competitions ===
As of 2007, CMAS directly oversees the following four competitions at international level: the World Championship, Continental Championships, the World Cup and the CMAS Junior Trophy.

==== World Championship ====
Since 1976

The World Championship is held every two years in odd-numbered years for senior swimmers starting with the year 2007 and in even-numbered years for junior swimmers starting with the year 2008. Pool competition held over five days while open water competition is held over a maximum of three days.

==== World Cup ====
This is an annual event which was first held in 2006 and consists of a minimum of three rounds including a final all known as meetings which are attended by swimmers from clubs affiliated to a CMAS national federation. Races are held in both swimming pool and open water sites for individuals and clubs in the age groupings of senior and junior for both male and female.

==== CMAS Junior Trophy ====
This is an annual swimming pool-based event for junior national teams for both male and female swimmers.

==== Continental championships ====
Continental championships which are conducted in an identical manner to the world championships require a minimum of five countries from a continental body such as Africa, America, Asia, Europe and Oceania as defined by the International Olympic Committee (IOC). The Continental championships are held every two years in odd-numbered years for senior swimmers starting with the year 2008 and in even-numbered years for junior swimmers starting with the year 2007. The European Championships have run since 1967 and have been held 21 times. Asian Finswimming Championships is reported to have been held 13 times with the first being held in 1989 and the most being held during 2012 in Da Nang, Vietnam.

1. CMAS Finswimming European Championship - 28th 1967–2023
2. CMAS Finswimming European Juniors Championship - 18th 2024
3. CMAS African and Arab Finswimming Championship - 1st 2023
4. CMAS Asian Finswimming Championship - 18th 1989–2023
5. CMAS Asian Juniors Finswimming Championship - 6th 2012–2023
6. CMAS Pan American Finswimming Championship - 8th 2023

Recent African and Arab zone development shows emerging finswimming infrastructure, with athletes competing in multiple continental championships during single seasons.

=== Other CMAS-aligned events ===
There have been three Pan-American Championships, starting in 1993, with the last being held in 2001 in Cali, Colombia. There have also been five "Arab Zone" Championships, the last was held in 2003 (in Beirut, Lebanon).

=== World Games ===
Finswimming has featured at the World Games as a trend sport since the inaugural games held during 1981. Participation is reserved for the best swimmers from the CMAS World Ranking and the best relay teams as selected by the CMAS Finswimming Commission.

=== Other multi-sport events ===
Finswimming has appeared at multi-sport events such as the following: Asian Indoor Games, Bolivarian Games, Southeast Asian Games, World Corporate Games from 1998 to 1992, and the World Scholar-Athlete Games. The sport was also demonstrated at the 27th Summer Universiade in July 2013 and at the 2015 European Games in June 2015.

=== Olympic Games ===
As of 2020, no finswimming competition or demonstration has been held at an Olympic Games. CMAS which is recognised by the IOC as the international sports federation for underwater sports was so recognised in 1986 solely on the basis of finswimming. In 1999, finswimming was reported as being considered for inclusion in the 2004 Summer Olympics in Athens, Greece. In 2002, the IOC considered underwater sports which includes finswimming as one of the sports to be added to the programme of the 2008 Summer Olympics in Beijing, China, but decided to decline admission to it and eight other sports on the basis of:

Statistics reviewed on federation affiliation, nations competing in major events and broadcast and press coverage of major events for most requested sports did not indicate a higher level of global participation and interest than sports currently in the Programme, and therefore could not be considered to bring additional value.

== See also ==
=== Competitions ===
- Finswimming World Championships – International event for the underwater sport of finswimming
- Finswimming at the World Games – Trend sport at the World Games
- Finswimming at the 2007 Asian Indoor Games – Competition in Macau Olympic Aqutic Centre, China
- Finswimming at the 2009 Asian Indoor Games – Competition held in Mỹ Đình National Aquatics Sports Complex, Hanoi, Vietnam
- Finswimming at the 2009 Southeast Asian Games
- Fin swimming at the 2011 Southeast Asian Games – Watersport competition in Palembang, Indonesia
- Texas Open Finswimming Invitational – Open finswimming competition held in Texas since 1999
- Underwater sports at the 2013 Bolivarian Games – Finswimming, free-diving and spearfishing events at San Lorenzo island

=== Finswimming by country ===
- Finswimming in Australia – Competitive watersport
- Finswimming in the United Kingdom – Competitive watersport
- Finswimming in the United States – Competitive watersport

=== Competitors and organisations ===
- Joel Armas – Cuban finswimmer (born 1973)
- Valentina Artemyeva – Russian swimmer
- Peppo Biscarini – Italian and American swimmer, freediver, and actor
- Misty Hyman – American swimmer (born 1979)
- Shavarsh Karapetyan – Armenian finswimmer (born 1953)
- Flori Lang – Swiss swimmer (born 1983)
- Vitalina Simonova – Russian swimmer (born 1992)
- Texas Finswimming Association – Official governing body for competitive and recreational finswimming in Texas

=== Records ===
- List of European records in finswimming
- List of British records in finswimming
- List of Commonwealth records in finswimming
- List of United States records in finswimming
- List of World records in finswimming
- List of Indonesian records in finswimming

=== Others ===
- Underwater sports
- Confédération Mondiale des Activités Subaquatiques
