= List of Commonwealth records in finswimming =

Below is the list of current Commonwealth Records for finswimming. The records are ratified by the Commonwealth Finswimming Committee, which is made up of the National Finswimming Governing Bodies of Commonwealth of Nations. The First Commonwealth Championships were held in Hobart, Tasmania, Australia in February 2007.

This page does not include the Commonwealth Finswimming Championship Records. This list echoes that found on the Swansea Finswimming Club Website and the British Finswimming Association documents website. These records are correct as of 4 December 2008. Times set before the First Commonwealth Championships have been allowed. All records have been accepted as a result of documentary evidence of the events or time-trials that they were set at.

Currently there are only four nations hold records: Australia (10), England (8), New Zealand (7) and Singapore (5). Finswimming is currently competed in eight Commonwealth Countries (including home nations); Australia, Canada, Cyprus, England, New Zealand, Scotland, Singapore, South Africa and Wales.

== Long course metres ==
=== Men ===
The records listed are correct as of 13 April 2008.

| Event | Time | Name | Team | Location |
|---|---|---|---|---|
| Surface | | | | |
| 50 m | 00:17.72 | (Singapore) lim Yao Xiang | 2003 | (Vietnam) Ho Chi Minh City |
| 100 m | 00:42.70 | (Singapore) Lam Zhi Loong | 2003 | (Vietnam) Ho Chi Minh City |
| 200 m | 01:37.44 | (New Zealand) Matt Saunders | 2000 | (Spain) Palma de Majorca |
| 400 m | 03:30.62 | (Australia) Jeremy Morse | 1994 | (China) Dong Guan |
| 800 m | 07:24.53 | (Australia) Jeremy Morse | 1994 | (China) Dong Guan |
| 1500 m | 14:20.69 | (Australia) Jeremy Morse | 1994 | (China) Dong Guan |
| Stereofins | | | | |
| 50 m | 00:21.55 | (England) George Hopkinson | 2007 | (Wales) Swansea |
| 100 m | 00:54.42 | (England) Alaric Smith | 2007 | (Wales) Swansea |
| 200 m | 02:08.62 | (England) Jason Smith | 2007 | (Belgium) Antwerp |
| Apnea | | | | |
| 50 m | 00:16.10 | (Singapore) Leslie Kwok Ying Wah | 2003 | (Vietnam) Ho Chi Minh City |
| Immersion | | | | |
| 100 m | 00:40.89 | (England) Alaric Smith | 2007 | (Belgium) Antwerp |
| 400 m | 03:39.75 | (Australia) Josef Kyskila | 1996 | (Australia) Canberra |
| 800 m | 08:54.12 | (England) Alaric Smith | 2007 | (Wales) Swansea |
| Relays | | | | |
| 4 × 100 m | 02:50.01 | Singapore | 2003 | (Vietnam) Ho Chi Minh City |
| 4 × 200 m | 07:03.41 | Australia | 1992 | (Australia) Athens |

=== Women ===
The records listed are correct as of 13 April 2008.

| Event | Time | Name | Year | Location |
|---|---|---|---|---|
| Surface | | | | |
| 50 m | 00:20.93 | (New Zealand) Juliet Tompkins | 2000 | (Spain) Palma de Majorca |
| 100 m | 00:46.54 | (New Zealand) Juliet Tompkins | 2000 | (Spain) Palma de Majorca |
| 200 m | 01:43.52 | (New Zealand) Juliet Tompkins | 2000 | (Spain) Palma de Majorca |
| 400 m | 03:44.70 | (New Zealand) Juliet Tompkins | 2000 | (Australia) Brisbane |
| 800 m | 08:17.06 | (Australia) Noemi Domonkos | 2001 | (Australia) Canberra |
| 1500 m | 16:17.08 | (Australia) Noemi Domonkos | 1996 | (Australia) Canberra |
| Stereofins | | | | |
| 50 m | 00:28.13 | (England) Aisling Crean | 2001 | (Sweden) Västerås |
| 100 m | 01:05.19 | (England) Aisling Crean | 2002 | (Germany) Berlin |
| 200 m | 02:24.88 | (England) Aisling Crean | 2002 | (Germany) Berlin |
| Apnea | | | | |
| 50 m | 00:19.42 | (New Zealand) Juliet Tompkins | 2000 | (Australia) Brisbane |
| Immersion | | | | |
| 100 m | 00:47.56 | (New Zealand) Brierly McNab | 1998 | (Colombia) Cali |
| 400 m | 03:50.99 | (Australia) Noemi Domonkos | 2000 | (Spain) Palma de Majorca |
| 800 m | 08:53.73 | (Australia) Sabina Lane | 1992 | (Greece) Athens |
| Relays | | | | |
| 4 × 100 m | 03:12.73 | Singapore | 2003 | (Vietnam) Ho Chi Minh City |
| 4 × 200 m | 08:00.47 | Australia | 1992 | (Greece) Athens |

== Short course metres ==
These have yet to be fully compiled. This may contain errors.

=== Men ===
The records listed are correct as of 13 April 2008.

| Event | Time | Name | Year | Location |
|---|---|---|---|---|
| Surface | | | | |
| 25 m | 00:08.58 | (England) Alastair Smith | 2008 | (England) Edenbridge |
| 50 m | 00:19.91 | (Australia) Brendan Rocha | 2008 | (China) Hong Kong |
| 100 m | 00:43.35 | (Australia) Brendan Rocha | 2008 | (China) Hong Kong |
| 200 m | 01:43.60 | (Australia) Brendan Rocha | 2005 | (Australia) Canberra |
| 400 m | 03:49.34 | (Australia) Adam Wind | 2000 | (Australia) Canberra |
| 800 m | 08:19.19 | (New Zealand) Danny Rogers | 1999 | (New Zealand) Rotorua |
| 1500 m | 16:22.66 | (Australia) Adam Wind | 2002 | (Australia) Canberra |
| Stereofins | | | | |
| 50 m | 00:25.17 | (England) Alan Barber | 2007 | (England) Edenbridge |
| 100 m | 01:13.09 | (England) Jon Bowring | 2007 | (England) Edenbridge |
| Apnea | | | | |
| 25 m | 00:07.42 | (England) Alaric Smith | 2000 | (Scotland) Glasgow |
| 50 m | 00:17.84 | (Australia) Brendan Rocha | 2002 | (Australia) Canberra |
| Immersion | | | | |
| 100 m | 00:45.43 | (England) Alaric Smith | 2007 | (England) Edenbridge |
| 400 m | No Time | | | |
| 800 m | 08:15.11 | (England) Alaric Smith | 2000 | (England) Gillingham |
| Relays | | | | |
| 4×50 m | 01:23.41 | (Australia) ACT Vikings | 2002 | (Australia) Canberra |
| 4 × 100 m | 03:16.22 | (Australia) ACT Vikings | 2002 | (Australia) Canberra |
| 4 × 200 m | No time | | | |

=== Women ===
The records listed are correct as of 13 April 2008.

| Event | Time | Name | Year | Location |
|---|---|---|---|---|
| Surface | | | | |
| 25 m | 00:10.49 | (New Zealand) Juliet Tompkins | 1999 | (New Zealand) Rotorua |
| 50 m | 00:21.86 | (New Zealand) Juliet Tompkins | 1999 | (New Zealand) Rotorua |
| 100 m | 00:49.17 | (New Zealand) Juliet Tompkins | 1999 | (New Zealand) Rotorua |
| 200 m | 01:47.92 | (New Zealand) Juliet Tompkins | 1999 | (New Zealand) Rotorua |
| 400 m | 03:52.65 | (New Zealand) Juliet Tompkins | 1999 | (New Zealand) Rotorua |
| 800 m | 08:34.71 | (New Zealand) Juliet Tompkins | 1999 | (New Zealand) Rotorua |
| 1500 m | 17:12.32 | (Australia) Rebekah Tunevitsch | 2001 | (Australia) Hobart |
| Stereofins | | | | |
| 50 m | 00:28.24 | (England) Aisling Crean | 2002 | (England) Edenbridge |
| 100 m | 01:06.42 | (England) Aisling Crean | 2002 | (England) Edenbridge |
| Apnea | | | | |
| 25 m | 00:09.84 | (Australia) Tamara Hosking | 2004 | (Australia) Canberra |
| 50 m | 00:21.82 | (New Zealand) Juliet Tompkins | 1999 | (New Zealand) Rotorua |
| Immersion | | | | |
| 100 m | 01:09.86 | (England) Claire Jacob | 2002 | (England) Edenbridge |
| 400 m | No Time | | | |
| 800 m | No Time | | | |
| Relays | | | | |
| 4×50 m | 01:52.06 | (England) Tonbridge F.C. | 2002 | (England) Edenbridge |
| 4 × 100 m | 04:13.61 | (Australia) ACT Vikings | 1999 | (Australia) Canberra |
| 4 × 200 m | No time | | | |

== Notes and references ==
=== Notes ===
Other notes on these records will be put here when they arise.

=== References ===
- Canadian Underwater Games Association
- British Finswimming Association
- Ozfin, Australian Finswimming Association
- Swansea Finswimming Club Commonwealth Records Page
- British Finswimming Association documents website
- Rotorua Geyser Dolphins
- Confederation Mondial des Activities Sub-aquatiques
- The East London Dispatch, 3 May 2003
