= List of United States records in finswimming =

Below is the list of current United States of America Fin Swimming National Records. The records are ratified by the Underwater Society of America and USA Fin Swimming.

== Long course meters (senior records) ==
=== Men ===
Event	Time	Name	Date	Meet	Location	Ref
Surface						
50 m	18.85	Joel Armas	2007	CMAS World Games	Bari, Italy	
100 m	41.69	Joel Armas	2007	CMAS World Games	Bari, Italy	
200 m	1:36.74	John Keppler	1996		Hayward, United States	
400 m	3:37.43	John Klepper	1996	Finswimming World Championships	Dunaujvaros, Hungary	
800 m	8:03.66	Kakwira Cook	1996		Hayward, United States	
1500 m	15:48.52	Kakwira Cook	2000	Finswimming World Championships	Palma de Mallorca, Spain	
Stereofins						
50 m	22.50	Santiago Mora	2018		Coral Springs, United States	
100 m	49.56	Santiago Mora	2018		Coral Springs, United States	
200 m	1:56.08	Santiago Mora	2018	Finswimming World Championships	Belgrade, Serbia	
400 m	4:26.31	Santiago Mora	2018		Coral Springs, United States	
Apnea						
50 m	16.01	Bryan Sullivan	12 July 2024	Finswimming World Championships	Belgrade, Serbia	
Immersion						
100 m	41.81	Chris Morgan	1996		Hobart, Australia	
400 m	3:33.08	John Keppler	1996	Finswimming World Championships	Dunaujvaros, Hungary	
800 m	9:31.76	Kakwira Cook	1997		Hobart, Australia	
Relays						
4 × 100 m	2:58.86	Chris Morgan; Rich Roll; Harry Laverde; John Keppler	1996	Finswimming World Championships	Dunaujvaros, Hungary	
4 × 200 m	6:42.63	Rick Roll; Harry Laverde; Derek Robinson; John Keppler	1996	Finswimming World Championships	Dunaujvaros, Hungary	

=== Women ===
Event	Time	Name	Date	Location	Ref
Surface					
50 m	21.01	Misty Hyman	1998	(United States) Fremont, CA, USA	
100 m	47.09	Misty Hyman	1996	Dunaujvaros, Hungary	
200 m	1:48.68	Misty Hyman	1998	(United States) Fremont, CA, USA	
400 m	4:09.71	Julieanne Fall	1998	(United States) Fremont, CA, USA	
800 m	8:45.99	Margo Diamond	1997	Hobart, Australia	
1500 m	16:49.41	Julieanne Fall	1998	(United States) Fremont, CA, USA	
Stereofins					
50 m	23.89	Kristine Kelly	2007	(United States) Houston, TX, USA	
100 m	53.84	Julia Golovina	2019	(United States) Coral Springs, FL, USA	
200 m	2:01.63	Julia Golovina	2021	(United States) Coral Springs, FL, USA	
400 m	4:18.51	Julia Golovina	2019	(United States) Coral Springs, FL, USA	
Apnea					
50 m	18.94	Misty Hyman	1996	(United States) Hayward, CA, USA	
Immersion					
100 m	49.88	Jenny Thompson	1996	Dunaujvaros, Hungary	
400 m	4:52.72	Margo Diamond	1997	Hobart, Australia	
800 m	10:27.50	Cynthia Coates	1996	Dunaujvaros, Hungary	
Relays					
4 × 100 m	3:38.39	Misty Hyman; Julieanne Fall; Jenny Thompson; Theresa Villa	1996	Dunaujvaros, Hungary	
4 × 200 m	7:49.22	Cynthia Coates; Theresa Villa; Jenny Thompson; Misty Hyman	1996	Dunaujvaros, Hungary	

== See also ==
- Finswimming in the United States
