= Peppo Biscarini =

Italian and American swimmer, freediver, and actor

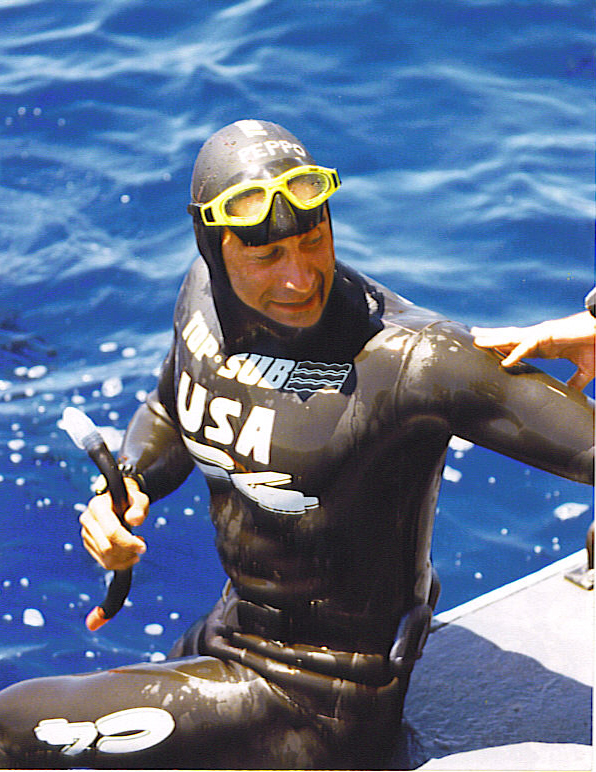
- Freediving World Cup 1998

Personal information
- Full name: Peppo Biscarini
- Nationality: Italian-American
- Born: November 4, 1960 (age 65) Milan, Italy
- Height: 1.86 m (6 ft 1 in)
- Weight: 95 kg (209 lb)
- Website: biscarini.com

Sport
- Sport: Swimming

Peppo Biscarini is an Italian-American swimmer, freediver, entrepreneur and evangelist. He represented both Italy and the United States in various international competitions and also won many titles. After retiring from his athletic career, he had a long stint as coach and entrepreneur. Later in life he responded to a higher calling and directed his life towards evangelism.

== Early life ==
Biscarini was born in Milan on November 4, 1960, to Sergio Biscarini, an opera singer, and Griffi Clotilde, an obstetrician. He moved to the United States in 1979 to train for the 1984 Olympics in swimming as well as to study. In 1999, he returned to Italy and opened the first Hedgefund marketing firm.

=== Personal life ===
In 1987, he married Jane in Santa Barbara, California and the couple have two children, Isabella and Marco.

== Career ==
=== Swimming ===
Biscarini started his swimming career at the age of 5 and participated at his first age group Nationals at the age of 10. In May 1976, at the age of 15 years, Peppo won the World Championship in finswimming marathon (24 hours), setting a new world record of 83.7 km by breaking the previous world record of 70.3 km. In 1980, he introduced for the first time in the US the monofin and the front-mounted snorkel starting a working relationship with coach Thornton at UC Berkeley and was credited as the person who introduced the sport of finswimming -the monofin and front-mounted snorkels- until then unknown, to North America. Biscarini was also the member of the Italian National Team at the European finswimming championship. In 1987, he was named US national technical director for the sport of finswimming by the Underwater Society of America, member of the USOC and controlling body for finswimming in the United States. He often writes for Pesca Sub, an Italian speciality magazine. In 1989, he founded Hyperfin, a high tech fin manufacturing company, and worked as a technical consultant with swimming programs at various top division 1 universities. In 1978, he became the Italian National champion in the open water swimming and represented Italy to the FINA World Open Water Swimming Championships Capri-Napoli in 1979. Biscarini is also a speaker at the World Clinic for swimming coaches, Chicago 1995. Integrated techniques of finswimming for the benefit of high-level swimming, CO_{2} tolerance training and swimming with front snorkels.

Biscarini also served as the technical consultant to Lockheed Martin underwater division to develop a human-powered submarine. From 1992 to 1996, he trained the US Navy Seals team for the International Military Sports Council (CISM) Military World Games in Coronado Island, CA. In 1998 he was best US athlete at the Freediving World Championship setting a US national record in constant weight (51 meters) after having set the US static breath hold record at 5:40.

=== Entrepreneur Evangelist and Life Coach ===
After 15 years of business as an entrepreneur and hedge fund marketer with the 1st Internet firm in this business, he was recruited by Campus Crusade for Christ. Biscarini pursued theological studies while living and ministering to influencers in Palm Beach, Florida from 2000 to 2004. He then returned to Italy and served as the National Director of GEM from 2004 to 2011. He also preached in different churches and nonprofit organizations. and wrote a manual for basic Christianity: "Quale via, verità, vita?". In 2012, he established ViaVeritas Inc as an international tool for evangelism and an instrument for cross-cultural student exchanges. He also created a sister city relationship between Chattanooga, Tennessee, and Manfredonia, Italy, with the approval of the respective mayors and the Sister City association in March 2014. He has an Italian podcast Equipaggiati discussing everyday occurrences in light of an eternal plan. The English channel is Equipped+. He appears on a Youtube channel in English PeppoCast English and in Italian PeppoCast

== Awards ==
Representative and best US athlete at the Freediving World Cup in 1998 (Sardinia-Italy) with national records of constant weight (51 mt), dynamic swim (125 mt) and static breath hold (5 min.39 sec). AIDA and PADI freediving instructor

Year	Title	Result	Distance	Ref
1976	World Championship finswimming	Gold medal	WR 83.7 km	
1977	National open water Championship, Italy	Gold medal	11.5 km - 2:14.10	
1978	World Championship finswimming	Gold medal	77.8 km	
1986-1989	National Championship finswimming, USA	Gold medal	100 and 200 mt	
1986-1989	National Championship finswimming, USA	Silver medal	50 mt	
1989	World corporate games - All-America title	Gold medal	NR 100 and 200 mt	
1989	World corporate games - All-America title	Silver medal	50 mt	
1998	World Cup Freediving - best US athlete		NR 51 mt C.W.	
1998	World Cup Freediving - best US athlete		NR 5:40 static BH	

== Television ==
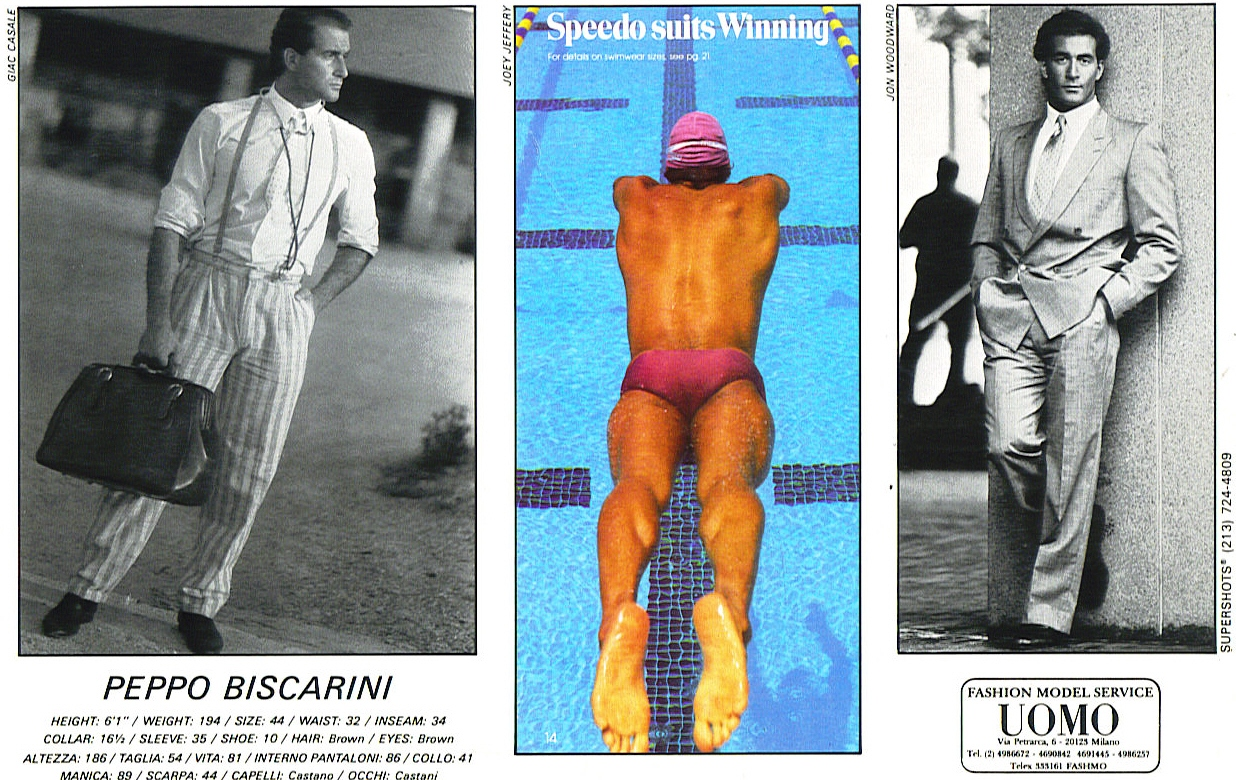

- Modeling career started in San Diego with Artist Management and in Italy with Fashion Model
- Between 1984 and 1989 appears in numerous national TV commercials like Honda, Ford, Coca-Cola, Hilton, Sprint, Anheuser-Busch, Unocal 76, Wheel of Fortune; in the TV soaps Capitol CBS, in the movie Dolphin Whales and Us, and in Italy in the movie Italian Fast Food.
