= World Scholar-Athlete Games =

The World Scholar-Athlete Games or WSAG was an event organized by the Institute for International Sport at the University of Rhode Island.

== Events ==
Bridge was added to the event in the 1997 WSAG.

== Controversy ==
In 2016, Dan Doyle, founder of the Games and the Institute for International Sport, was found guilty of embezzlement and forgery.

== The Games ==
Year	Host	Sports/Events	Number of Participants	Keynote Speakers
1993	University of Rhode Island		1200	Galway Kinnell, Ralph Nader, Jack Healy
1997	University of Rhode Island		2000	
2001	University of Rhode Island			
2006	University of Rhode Island			Bill O'Reilly, Bode Miller, Bill Clinton
2011	University of Hartford		1000	Linda McMahon, Colin Powell
