= Monofin =

Single blade swimfin attached to both feet

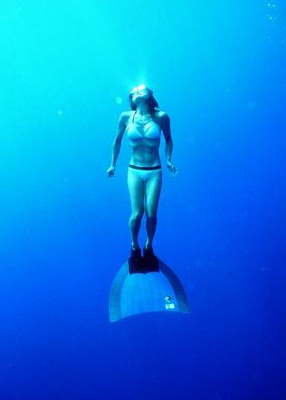
A freediver using a monofin

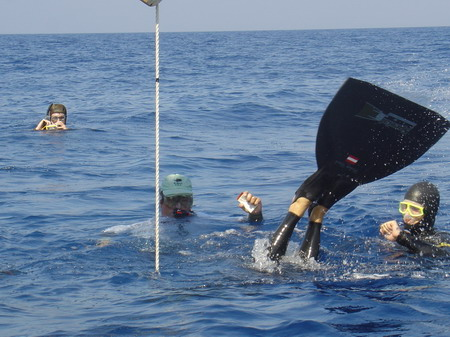
Herbert Nitsch wearing a monofin at the Cyprus BIOS 2004 Freediving Open Classic

A monofin is a type of swimfin typically used in underwater sports such as finswimming, free-diving and underwater orienteering. It consists of a single or linked surfaces attached to both of the diver's feet, emulating the fluke of Cetaceans like whales or porpoises. Even though the diver's appearance might be reminiscent of a mermaid or merman, monofin swimming is not the same as mermaiding.

The arrival of the monofin in the early 1970s led to the breaking of all finswimming world records by the end of the decade due to the improved performance possible when used instead of two ordinary swimfins.

== Use ==
To differentiate between the use of monofins and conventional fins, the latter are sometimes referred to as stereo fins or bi-fins.

The monofin swimmer extends arms forward, locking hands together, locking the head between the biceps, in a position known as streamline position. The undulating movement starts in the shoulders, with maximum amplitude towards the hips; the legs almost don't bend to transfer the movement to the monofin. This technique is called the dolphin kick.

By slowly oscillating the surface of the monofin when submerged, divers can generate large amounts of thrust even with small or slow movements. This preserves energy which helps when breathholding (apnea).

Monofin kick tempo doesn't have to be slow. In 100 m surface swimming, tempo is around 2 kicks per second.

Separate from its functional use in swimming or diving, monofins may be used ornamentally, as part of a mermaid costume.

== History ==
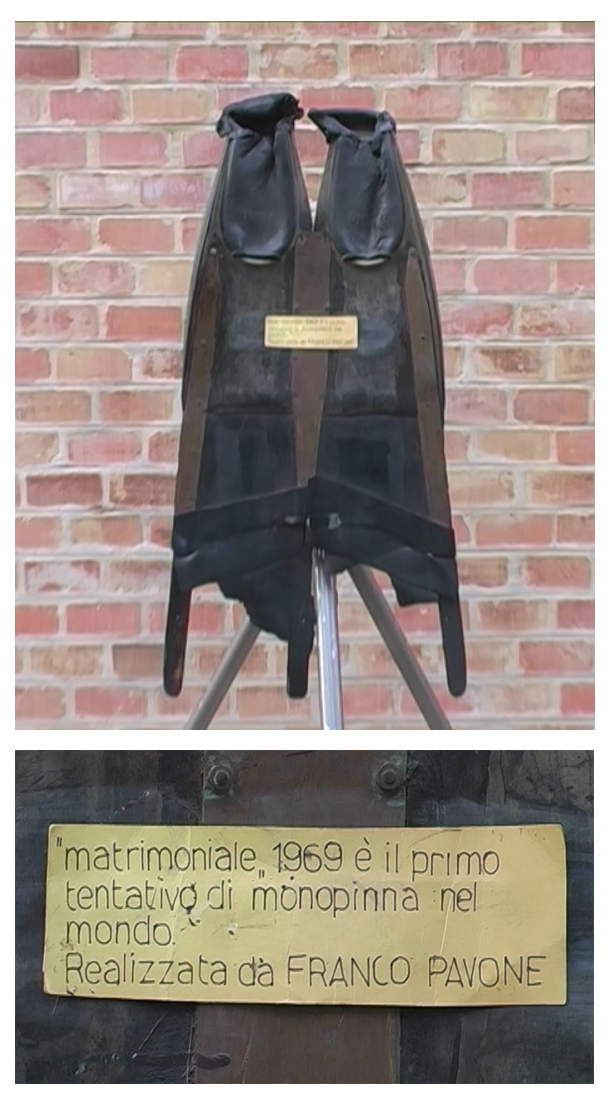
Monofin made in 1969 by Franco Pavone in Bologna

1949: Kurt Schaefer, who invented an underwater film camera during wartime military service in Italy, designs a pair of homemade swimming fins, which he proceeds to fasten together with straps and cords to create what is probably the world's first monofin. The artefact is on display in the Aquazoo-Löbbecke Museum in the German city of Düsseldorf.

1955: On 19 September 1955, Kurt Ristau and Hans Joachim Bergann, who founded the underwater diving equipment manufacturing company Barakuda in the early 1950s in the German city of Hamburg after serving as combat swimmers during World War II, file a patent for a monofin-like device for swimmers incorporating both feet. Although the invention receives German patent 1085798 on 12 January 1961, it never enters the production stage.

1962: On 15 October 1962, James S Christiansen files a patent for a device enabling a pair of swimming fins to be coupled together to reduce fatigue and cramping during prolonged swimming. Although the detachable coupling converting the separate swimming fins into a monofin-like design is granted US patent 3165764A on 19 January 1965, it does not appear to have entered the production stage.

1967: In his review of the range of fins available in France during that year, J. Larue mentions how unnamed experts are experimenting with the use of a single swim fin accommodating both feet of the swimmer, who deploys the butterfly stroke to progress in the water. Although the experiment yields relatively satisfactory results for swimmers, Larue concludes that this fin is unsuitable for divers.

1969: Franco Pavone constructs his "Matrimoniale" monofin in the Italian city of Bologna. After designing a high-speed monofin with a metal-reinforced rubber blade, Boris Porotov (Kazakh Soviet Socialist Republic) builds an entire blade out of fibreglass-reinforced plastic.

1970: On 10 December 1970, Spanish underwater diving equipment company Nemrod-Metzeler patents a monofin-like device for swimmers incorporating both feet, but it never enters production.

1971: Nadejda Turukalo (USSR) arrives at European Finswimming Championship (1970, Barcelona, Spain) with a monofin constructed from two titanium branches, joined by a "sail". She beats all comers. Monofins have been used ever since for finswimming competitions, allowing monofin swimmers to reach speeds of 12 km/h. Traditional monofin 50 m apnea world record is as fast as 13 km/h.

== Construction ==
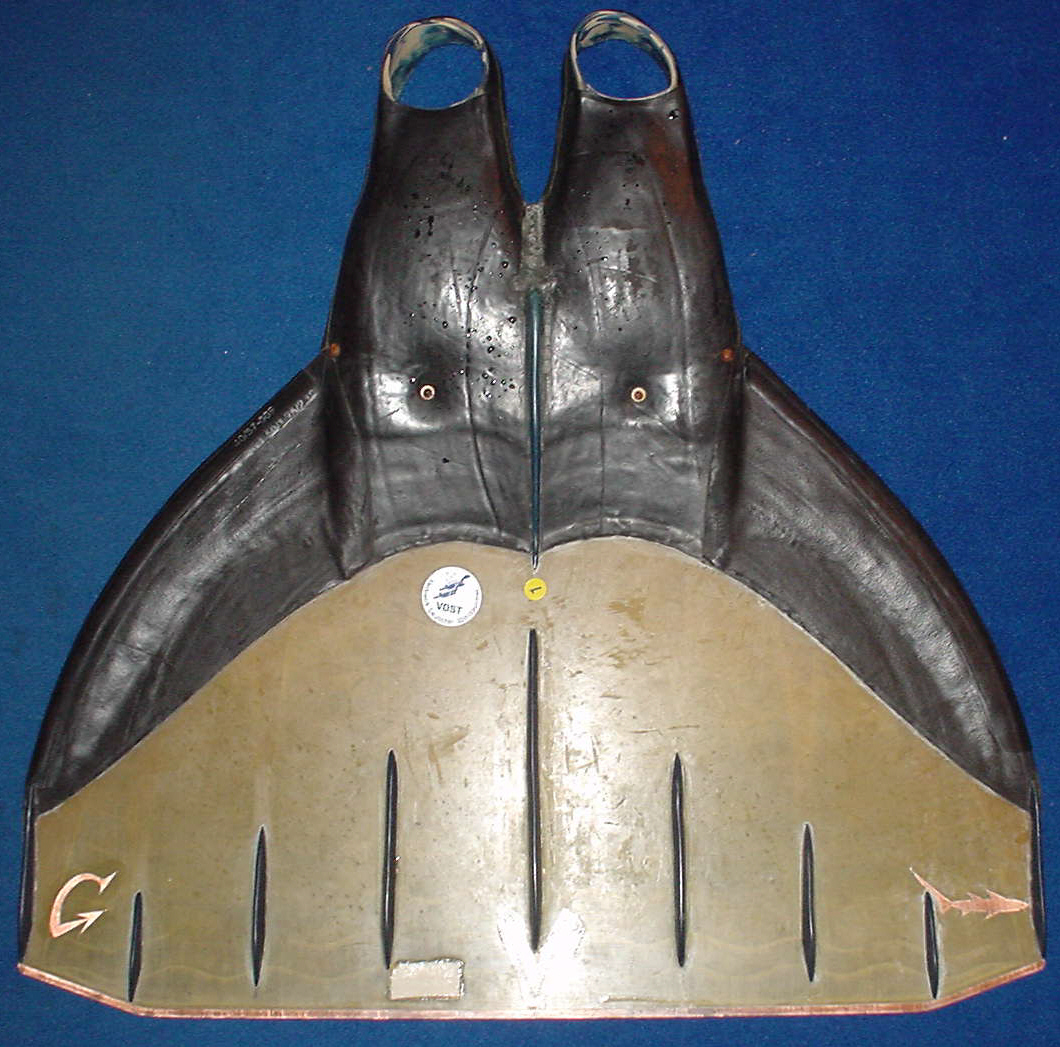
Monofin

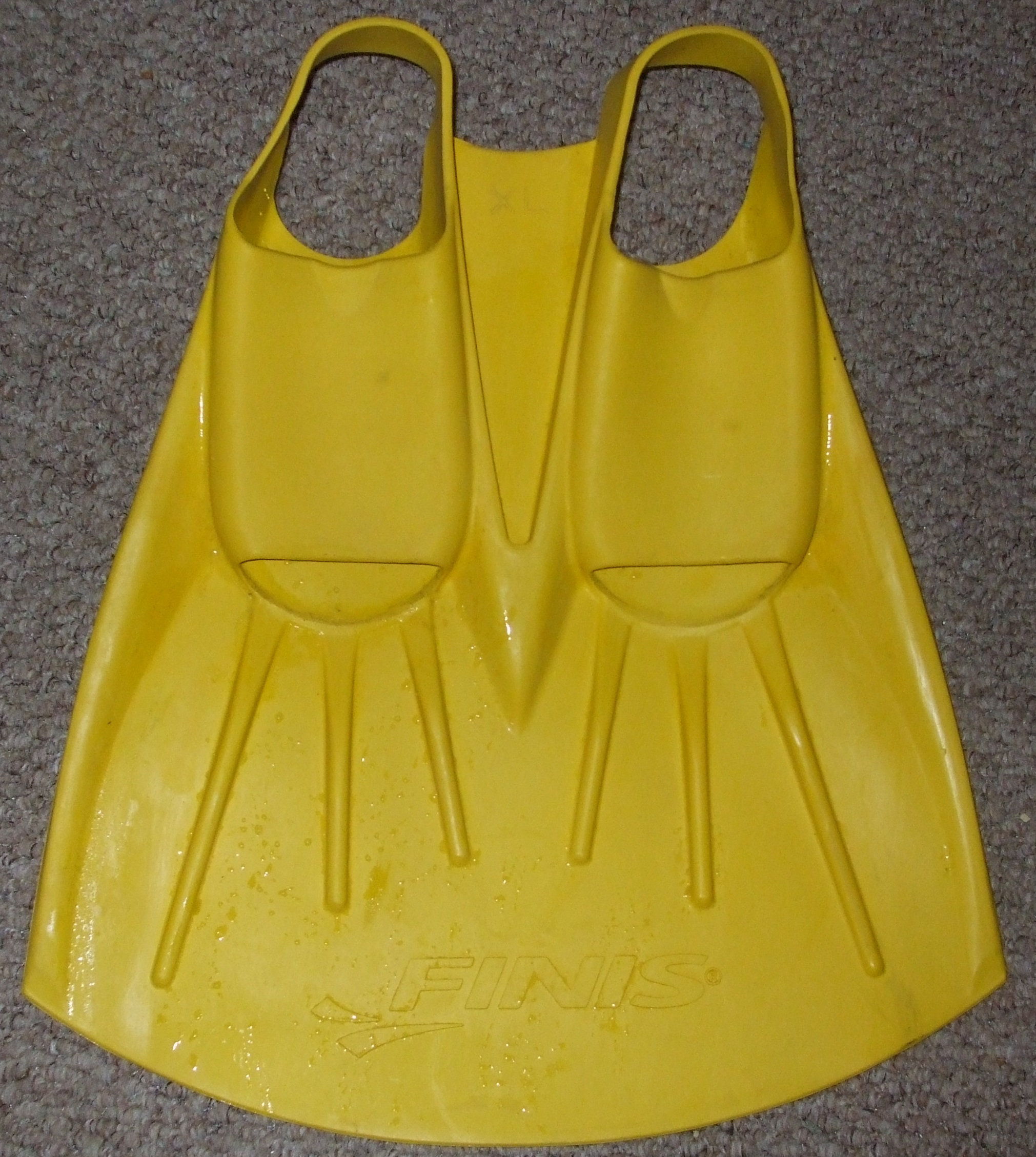
All-rubber monofin for pool workouts with other swimmers present and for younger swimmers with growing feet

Monofins can be made of glass fiber, carbon fiber, or aluminum, and rubber. The diver's muscle power, swimming style, and the type of aquatic activity the monofin is used for determine the choice of size, stiffness, and materials.

Most monofins consist of a single, wide, glass or carbon fiber reinforced composite blade with graded flexibility, attached to the diver by two rubber foot pockets. The leading edge may be thickened and faired. The blade flexibility is generally controlled by tapering the amount of fibre and thickness of the blade to make the trailing edge thinner and more flexible.

== See also ==
- Mermaiding – Swimming dressed in a mermaid costume
