= 2015 SEA Games opening ceremony =

2015 Southeast Asian Games Opening Ceremony
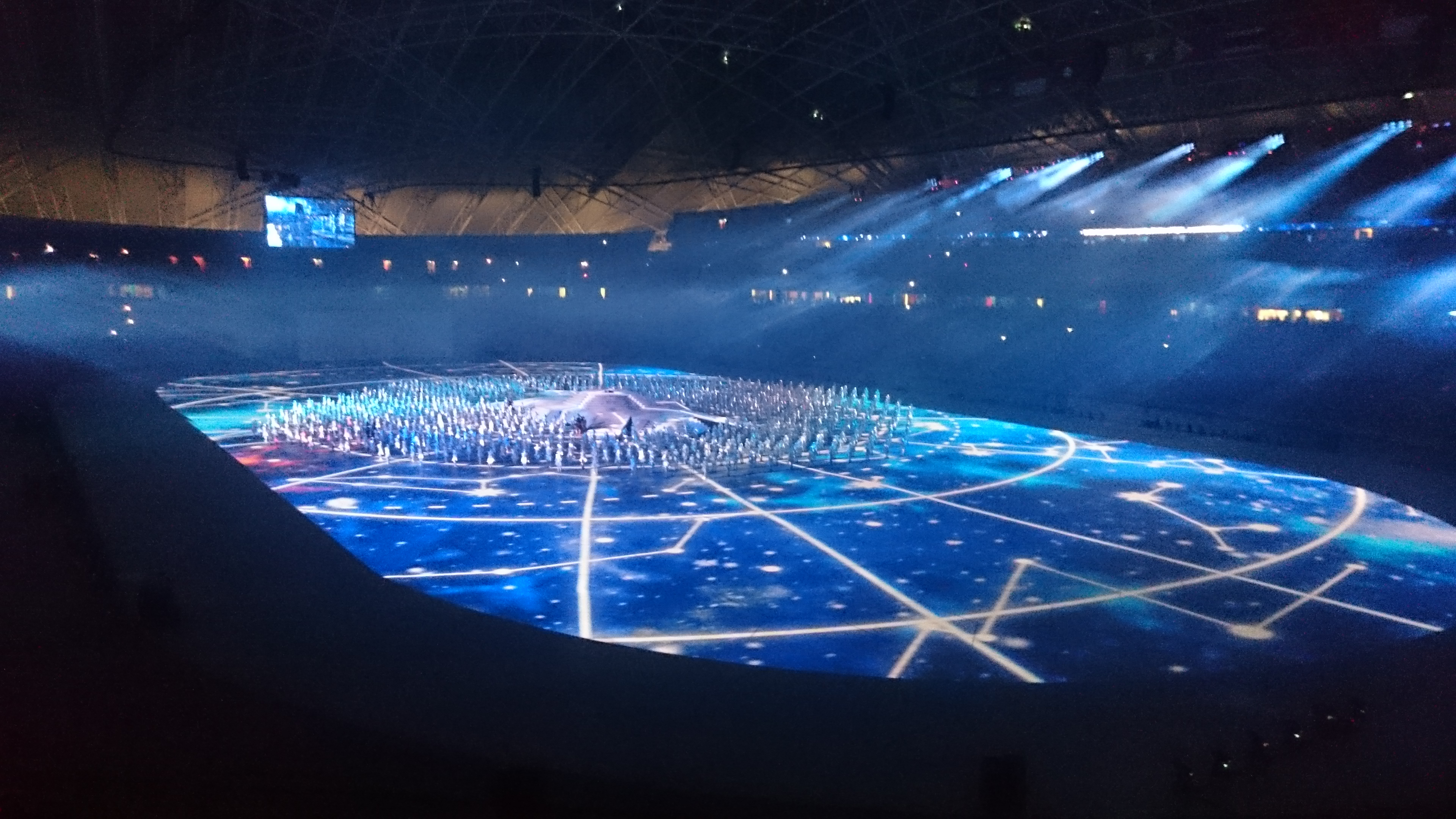
- Date: 5 June 2015
- Time: 20:00 - 22:00 SST (UTC+08:00) (2 hours)
- Location: Singapore Sports Hub, Kallang, Singapore
- Also known as: Celebrate the Extraordinary
- Filmed by: IGBS on behalf of Mediacorp
- Footage: The Opening Ceremony of the 28th Southeast Asian Games on YouTube

The opening ceremony of the 2015 Southeast Asian Games was held on Friday, 5 June 2015, beginning at 20:15 SST (UTC+8) at the National Stadium in Singapore, the first major opening ceremony for a sporting event in the new venue.

== Background ==
The Singapore Armed Forces organized the ceremony, which has also been responsible for the annual National Day Parade. They were supported by a creative team, with Beatrice Chia-Richmond serving as Creative Director. The ceremony was helmed by more than 5,000 performers and volunteers and supported by 3,500 soldiers. Given the enclosed nature of the stadium, extensive use of an aerial system to allow suspension and movement of performers and props are possible. Floor projection are accomplished using 160 multimedia high-definition projectors. The time 20:15 was chosen to start the opening ceremony to mark the year 2015, the year in which Singapore hosted the 28th Southeast Asian Games.

== Proceedings ==
=== Countdown ===
The ceremony begins with the band orchestra performance and historical lookout of previously hosted Singapore Southeast Asian Games and footage of people lineup distance countdown to Singapore National Stadium followed by the arrival of the VIPs, Singapore's President, Tony Tan, and Prime Minister, Lee Hsien Loong. The hosts of the ceremony are Nikki Muller, Chua En Lai and Sharon Au. The National Anthem of Singapore, Majulah Singapura was played as the national flag of Singapore was raised, followed by a countdown video projection.

=== Main event ===
==== Prelude - The Big Singapore Welcome ====
The 1,200 volunteers from Singapore Soka Association performance forming the map of Singapore with nature theme, showcasing Singapore as a Garden City with plants and animals. This is accompanied by the traditional dances of Singapore's main races: Malay, Indian, Chinese and Eurasian and fireworks erupted around the stadium. Nila, the mascot apparently leaped down in the stadium with a hanging parachute after the video footage of the mascot to the tune of I Got You (I Feel Good) by the late former American singer James Brown.

==== Parade of Nations ====
As per Southeast Asian Games Federation (SEAGF) protocol, parade of athletes from all 11 competing nations started with Brunei leading the field in English alphabetical order and ended with the host nation, Singapore entering the stadium last.

Order	Nation	Flag bearer	Sport
1	Brunei (BRU) (Brunei Darussalam)	Faustina Woo Wai Sii	Wushu
2	Cambodia (CAM)	San Sophorn	Sepak takraw
3	Indonesia (INA)	I Gusti Made Oka Sulaksana	Sailing
4	Laos (LAO)	Bouadeng Vongvone	Petanque
5	Malaysia (MAS)	Leong Mun Yee	Diving
6	Myanmar (MYA)	Ye Sithu	Fencing
7	Philippines (PHI)	Alyssa Valdez	Volleyball
8	Thailand (THA)	Chanathip Songkrasin	Football
9	Timor-Leste (TLS) (Timor-Leste)	Elio Jenoveva Edito	Boxing
10	Vietnam (VIE)	Hoang Quy Phuoc	Swimming
11	Singapore (SIN)	Quah Ting Wen	Swimming

==== Speeches and protocols ====
This was followed by parade of the Southeast Asian Games Federation flag and the games edition flag by former and current Singaporean sportsmen and sportswomen respectively, the late Lee Kuan Yew footage about the 2015 Southeast Asian Games, welcoming speech of Lawrence Wong, and declaration of games opening by Tony Tan Keng Yam, President of Singapore.

The former athletes that carry the federation flag are K. Jayamani of athletics, David Lim of swimming, Lee Wung Yew of shooting, Wong Liang Ming of taekwondo, Zainal Abidin of squash, Adelene Wee of bowling, Tao Yi Jun of wushu and Yip Ren Kai of water polo. Whereas the current athletes that carry the Games flag are Geraldine Lee of canoeing, Shayna Ng of bowling, Chelsea Ann Sim of taekwondo, Dipna Lim Prasad of athletics, Eugene Teo of water polo, Muhammad Nur Alfian of silat, Daniel Marc Chow of rugby and Ridhwan Ahmad of boxing. Flags of the games federation and edition were raised to the song "Reach" performed by local songwriter Dick Lee and the Methodist Girls’ School choir. Athlete's and judge's oath are taken by "Micky" Lin Qingyi, Singapore's netball player and Azhar Yusoff the rugby judge and referee respectively.

==== Main performances ====
These are followed by a 40-minute show of 5 acts or segments, which are mass performances performed by students all over Singapore, volunteers from Singapore Soka Association and notable Singapore celebrities such as rapper Shigga Shay, HubbaBubbas band, violinists Joey Lau and Siow Lee Chin, guitarist Bani Hidir, vocal group Vocaluptuous, singer Daphne Khoo and The Sam Willows. The acts are Act One - DNA, Act Two - Imagination which includes the video footage of children of Southeast Asian nations speak of their ambitions and dreams in their national or native language, Act Three - Youth Expression, Act Four - Sports And The City which includes appearance of Singapore top athlete Joseph Schooling and several former athletes such as Ang Peng Siong of swimming, Ben Tan of sailing, C Kunalan of athletics, Glory Barnabas of athletics, Grace Young of bowling, Joscelin Yeo of swimming, Melanie Martens of hockey and Sheik Alau’ddin of silat, and video footage of gratitude from coaches all over Southeast Asia and Act 5 - Singapore in the Stadium where a gigantic model of DNA emerge slowly from the center of the stage, performers once again form the map of Singapore but with the model of Singapore's iconic buildings in it.

Act One told the story of DNA as a thing that makes human different and understand each other, Act two told the story of how children use their dream to imagine, Act three told the story of how Youths use dream to express themselves, Act four told the story of how family support become an inspiration for athletes and coaches to achieve success in sports. While Act 5, the conclusion told the story of how Singaporean athletes welcome, make friends and unite with the athletes other country of Southeast Asia regardless of language, race and belief.

==== Torch relay ====
Soon after the last act, the torch of the Games was carried into the stadium from a dragon boat across the Kallang basin by several Singapore's former and current generation of sportsmen and sportswomen. The current sportspeople are Clement Teo of Dragon Boat, Liang Xiaoyu of Badminton, Muhammad Naqib Asmin of Athletics, Gabriel Yang of Judo, Dinah Chan of Cycling, Enrico Marican of Hockey, Shanti Pereira of Athletics, Derek Wong Zi Liang of Badminton, while the former sportspeople are Annabel Pennefather of Hockey, Prema Govindran of Athletics and Wong Shoon Keat of Badminton. The cauldron was lit by former footballer, Fandi Ahmad and his son and current footballer, Irfan Fandi. The cauldron's design was inspired by the DNA which represents the unity of nations, communities and individuals of Southeast Asia. It is made of stainless steel, 19.2-metre-high and has a LED screen on it that displays information such as the time and weather during the Games. It also has a burner that able to project a 1.5m- to 4m-high flame and 11 bars within the structure that represent the different countries participating at the Games. A colourful fireworks display then erupted over the skyline surrounding the National Stadium, signalling the official commencement of the Games. The ceremony concludes with the President leaving the stadium.

== Performers ==
- Dick Lee and Methodist Girls’ School choir (performing "Reach")
- Vocaluptuous (performing "Ordinary" and "You Raise Me Up")
- Daphne Khoo (performing "Greatest")

== Dignitaries in attendance ==
=== Host nation ===
- Tony Tan Keng Yam, President of Singapore
- Mary Chee Bee Kiang, First lady of Singapore
- Lee Hsien Loong, Prime Minister of Singapore
- Ho Ching, Spouse of the Prime Minister of Singapore
- Tan Chuan Jin, President of Singapore National Olympic Council and Minister of Social and Family Development
- Lawrence Wong, Minister for Culture, Community and Youth

=== Foreign leaders and representatives ===
- Hassanal Bolkiah, Sultan of Brunei Darussalam
- Queen Saleha of Brunei, Raja Isteri of Brunei Darussalam
- Prince Mateen of Brunei Darussalam
- Dr. Hang Chuon Naron, Minister of Education, Youth and Sport of Cambodia (representing King Norodom Sihamoni)
- Megawati Sukarnoputri, former President of Indonesia (representing President Joko Widodo)
- Nyan Tun, Vice President of Myanmar (representing President Thein Sein)
