= Athletics at the 2015 SEA Games – Men's 3000 metres steeplechase =

The men's 3000 metres steeplechase at the 2015 SEA Games was held in National Stadium, Singapore. The track and field events took place on June 12.

== Schedule ==
All times are (UTC+08:00)

Date	Time	Event
Friday, 12 June 2015	17:30	Final

== Records ==
Prior to this competition, the existing world, Asian, and Southeast Asian Games records were as follows.

World Record	Saif Saaeed Shaheen (QAT)	7:53.63	Brussels, Belgium	3 September 2004
Asian Record	Saif Saaeed Shaheen (QAT)	7:53.63	Brussels, Belgium	3 September 2004
Games Record	Eduardo Buenavista (PHI)	8:40.77	Kuala Lumpur, Malaysia	12 December 2001

== Results ==
Legend

- PB — Personal Best

Rank	Athlete	Time	Note
1st place, gold medalist(s)	Christopher Ulboc, Jr. (PHI)	8:59.07	
2nd place, silver medalist(s)	Pham Tien San (VIE)	8:59.90	PB
3rd place, bronze medalist(s)	Atjong Tio Purwanto (INA)	9:06.41	PB
4	Ahmad Luth Hamizan (MAS)	9:18.42	PB
5	Mar Kaut (MYA)	9:20.85	PB
6	Le Trong Giang (VIE)	9:25.08	
7	Ribeiro Pinto de Carvalho (TLS)	9:34.42	PB
8	Sysavath Thammavongchith (LAO)	9:37.41	PB
9	Mohamed Shah Feroz Moheden (SIN)	9:42.78	PB
10	Rene Herrera (PHI)	9:52.38	
11	Colin Tung Zhi Shing (SIN)	9:54.76	PB
