= Badminton at the 2015 SEA Games – Men's doubles =

Men's doubles at the 2015 SEA Games
- Venue: Singapore Indoor Stadium
- Dates: 13–16 June 2015
- Competitors: 34 from 9 nations

Medalists
gold medal	Angga Pratama; Ricky Karanda Suwardi	Indonesia
silver medal	Marcus Fernaldi Gideon; Kevin Sanjaya Sukamuljo	Indonesia
bronze medal	Danny Bawa Chrisnanta; Chayut Triyachart	Singapore
bronze medal	Ronel Estanislao; Philip Joper Escueta	Philippines

The men's doubles competition in badminton at the 2015 SEA Games is being held from 13 to 16 June 2015 at the Singapore Indoor Stadium in Kallang, Singapore.

== Schedule ==
All times are Singapore Standard Time (UTC+08:00)

Date	Time	Event
Saturday, 13 June 2015	14:00	Round of 32
Saturday, 13 June 2015	16:00	Round of 16
Sunday, 14 June 2015	17:00	Quarterfinals
Monday, 15 June 2015	15:40	Semifinals
Tuesday, 16 June 2015	11:30	Gold medal match

== Results ==
Source: Results Summary

Round of 32; 13 June 14:00
Meksavang Phommaly (LAO)} Phanthalang Outhaithani (LAO)}	13	13
Ngoun Kanora (CAM); Teav Yongvannak (CAM)	21	21

Round of 16; 13 June 16:00
Ngoun Kanora (CAM); Teav Yongvannak (CAM)	22	22
Htoo Aung Myo (MYA); Oo Chan Win (MYA)	13	13

Round of 16; 13 June 16:00
1	Angga Pratama (INA); Ricky Karanda Suwardi (INA)	21	21
Mak Hee Chun (MAS); Teo Kok Siang (MAS)	17	17
Peter Gabriel Magnaye (PHI); Paul Jefferson Vivas (PHI)	21	21
Yan Kosal (CAM); Ein Phirom (CAM)	2	9
Danny Bawa Chrisnanta (SIN); Chayut Triyachart (SIN)	21	21
Aniloud Keophithoun (LAO); Phakornkham Fongmalayseng (LAO)	12	15
Wannawat Ampunsuwan (THA); Pakkawat Vilailak (THA)	21	21
Lê Hà Anh (VIE); Đào Mạnh Thắng (VIE)	18	19
Ngoun Kanora (CAM); Teav Yongvannak (CAM)	22	22
Htoo Aung Myo (MYA); Oo Chan Win (MYA)	20	20
Ronel Estanislao (PHI); Philip Joper Escueta (PHI)	21	21
Terry Hee (SIN); Hendra Wijaya (SIN)	18	15
Đỗ Tuấn Đức (VIE); Phạm Hồng Nam (VIE)	8	15
Bodin Isara (THA); Nipitphon Phuangphuapet (THA)	21	21
Marcus Fernaldi Gideon (INA); Kevin Sanjaya Sukamuljo (INA)	12	21	21
2	Goh V Shem (MAS); Tan Wee Kiong (MAS)	21	10	17

Quarterfinal; 14 June 17:00
1	Pratama (INA); Suwardi (INA)	21	21
Magnaye (PHI); Vivas (PHI)	16	8
Chrisnanta (SIN); Triyachart (SIN)	21	17	21
Ampunsuwan (THA); Vilailak (THA)	19	21	18
Ngoun (CAM); Teav (CAM)	8	10
Estanislao (PHI); Escueta (PHI)	21	21
Isara (THA); Phuangphuapet (THA)	21	15	11
Gideon (INA); Sukamuljo (INA)	14	21	21

Semifinal; 15 June 15:40
1	Pratama (INA); Suwardi (INA)	21	21
Chrisnanta (SIN); Triyachart (SIN)	12	18
Estanislao (PHI); Escueta (PHI)	14	12
Gideon (INA); Sukamuljo (INA)	21	21

Gold medal match 16 June 11:30
1	Pratama (INA); Suwardi (INA)	21	24
Gideon (INA); Sukamuljo (INA)	12	22
