= Badminton at the 2015 SEA Games =

- Venue: Singapore Indoor Stadium
- Dates: 10–16 June 2015
- Competitors: 110 from 9 nations

Badminton at the 2015 SEA Games is held in Singapore Indoor Stadium, in Kallang, Singapore from 10 to 16 June 2015. Seven competitions were held in men and women's singles and in men, women and mixed's doubles and in men and women's team.

== Participating nations ==
A total of 110 athletes from nine nations is competing in badminton at the 2015 SEA Games:

- Cambodia (6)
- Indonesia (20)
- Laos (4)
- Malaysia (20)
- Myanmar (4)
- Philippines (4)
- Singapore (20)
- Thailand (20)
- Vietnam (12)

== Competition schedule ==
The following is the competition schedule for the badminton competitions:

P	Preliminaries	¼	Quarterfinals	½	Semifinals	F	Final

Event↓/Date →	Wed 10	Thu 11	Fri 12	Sat 13	Sun 14	Mon 15	Tue 16
Men's singles				P	¼	½	F
Men's doubles				P	¼	½	F
Men's team	¼	½	F				
Women's singles				P	¼	½	F
Women's doubles				P	¼	½	F
Women's team	¼	½	F				
Mixed doubles				P	¼	½	F

== Medalists ==
Event	Gold	Silver	Bronze
Men's singles	Malaysia; Chong Wei Feng	Malaysia; Mohamad Arif Abdul Latif	Singapore; Loh Kean Yew
Men's singles	Malaysia; Chong Wei Feng	Malaysia; Mohamad Arif Abdul Latif	Thailand; Tanongsak Saensomboonsuk
Women's singles	Thailand; Busanan Ongbamrungphan	Indonesia; Hanna Ramadini	Malaysia; Goh Jin Wei
Women's singles	Thailand; Busanan Ongbamrungphan	Indonesia; Hanna Ramadini	Vietnam; Vũ Thị Trang
Men's doubles	Indonesia (INA); Angga Pratama; Ricky Karanda Suwardi	Indonesia (INA); Marcus Fernaldi Gideon; Kevin Sanjaya Sukamuljo	Philippines (PHI); Ronel Estanislao; Philip Joper Escueta
Men's doubles	Indonesia (INA); Angga Pratama; Ricky Karanda Suwardi	Indonesia (INA); Marcus Fernaldi Gideon; Kevin Sanjaya Sukamuljo	Singapore (SIN); Danny Bawa Chrisnanta; Chayut Triyachart
Women's doubles	Malaysia (MAS); Amelia Alicia Anscelly; Soong Fie Cho	Malaysia (MAS); Vivian Hoo; Woon Khe Wei	Indonesia (INA); Anggia Shitta Awanda; Ni Ketut Mahadewi Istarani
Women's doubles	Malaysia (MAS); Amelia Alicia Anscelly; Soong Fie Cho	Malaysia (MAS); Vivian Hoo; Woon Khe Wei	Indonesia (INA); Maretha Dea Giovani; Suci Rizky Andini
Mixed doubles	Indonesia (INA); Praveen Jordan; Debby Susanto	Malaysia (MAS); Chan Peng Soon; Goh Liu Ying	Indonesia (INA); Riky Widianto; Richi Puspita Dili
Mixed doubles	Indonesia (INA); Praveen Jordan; Debby Susanto	Malaysia (MAS); Chan Peng Soon; Goh Liu Ying	Thailand (THA); Sudket Prapakamol; Sapsiree Taerattanachai
Men's team	Indonesia (INA); Angga Pratama; Anthony Sinisuka Ginting; Firman Abdul Kholik; Jonatan Christie; Ihsan Maulana Mustofa; Kevin Sanjaya Sukamuljo; Marcus Fernaldi Gideon; Praveen Jordan; Ricky Karanda Suwardi; Riky Widianto	Thailand (THA); Bodin Isara; Boonsak Ponsana; Khosit Phetpradab; Maneepong Jongjit; Nipitphon Phuangphuapet; Pakkawat Vilailak; Sudket Prapakamol; Suppanyu Avihingsanon; Tanongsak Saensomboonsuk; Wannawat Ampunsuwan	Malaysia (MAS); Chan Peng Soon; Chong Wei Feng; Goh V Shem; Iskandar Zulkarnain Zainuddin; Lee Chong Wei; Mak Hee Chun; Mohamad Arif Abdul Latif; Tan Aik Quan; Tan Wee Kiong; Teo Kok Siang
Men's team	Indonesia (INA); Angga Pratama; Anthony Sinisuka Ginting; Firman Abdul Kholik; Jonatan Christie; Ihsan Maulana Mustofa; Kevin Sanjaya Sukamuljo; Marcus Fernaldi Gideon; Praveen Jordan; Ricky Karanda Suwardi; Riky Widianto	Thailand (THA); Bodin Isara; Boonsak Ponsana; Khosit Phetpradab; Maneepong Jongjit; Nipitphon Phuangphuapet; Pakkawat Vilailak; Sudket Prapakamol; Suppanyu Avihingsanon; Tanongsak Saensomboonsuk; Wannawat Ampunsuwan	Singapore (SIN); Chayut Triyachart; Danny Bawa Chrisnanta; Terry Hee; Hendra Wijaya; Sean Lee; Loh Kean Hean; Loh Kean Yew; Ryan Ng; Jason Wong; Derek Wong
Women's team	Thailand (THA); Busanan Ongbamrungphan; Duanganong Aroonkesorn; Jongkolphan Kititharakul; Kunchala Voravichitchaikul; Nitchaon Jindapol; Porntip Buranaprasertsuk; Puttita Supajirakul; Ratchanok Intanon; Rawinda Prajongjai; Sapsiree Taerattanachai	Malaysia (MAS); Amelia Alicia Anscelly; Goh Jin Wei; Goh Liu Ying; Ho Yen Mei; Lai Pei Jing; Lim Yin Fun; Soong Fie Cho; Tee Jing Yi; Vivian Hoo; Woon Khe Wei	Indonesia (INA); Anggia Shitta Awanda; Debby Susanto; Dinar Dyah Ayustine; Gregoria Mariska Tunjung; Hanna Ramadini; Lindaweni Fanetri; Maretha Dea Giovani; Ni Ketut Mahadewi Istarani; Richi Puspita Dili; Suci Rizky Andini
Women's team	Thailand (THA); Busanan Ongbamrungphan; Duanganong Aroonkesorn; Jongkolphan Kititharakul; Kunchala Voravichitchaikul; Nitchaon Jindapol; Porntip Buranaprasertsuk; Puttita Supajirakul; Ratchanok Intanon; Rawinda Prajongjai; Sapsiree Taerattanachai	Malaysia (MAS); Amelia Alicia Anscelly; Goh Jin Wei; Goh Liu Ying; Ho Yen Mei; Lai Pei Jing; Lim Yin Fun; Soong Fie Cho; Tee Jing Yi; Vivian Hoo; Woon Khe Wei	Singapore (SIN); Chen Jiayuan; Elaine Chua; Grace Chua; Liang Xiaoyu; Vanessa Neo; Ren-ne Ong; Shinta Mulia Sari; Tan Wei Han; Crystal Wong; Yeo Jia Min

== Medal standings ==
* Host nation (Singapore)

Rank	Nation	Gold	Silver	Bronze	Total
1	Indonesia	3	2	4	9
2	Malaysia	2	4	2	8
3	Thailand	2	1	2	5
4	Singapore*	0	0	4	4
5	Philippines	0	0	1	1
5	Vietnam	0	0	1	1
Totals (6 entries)		7	7	14	28
