= Badminton at the 2015 SEA Games – Men's team =

Badminton – Men's team at the 2015 SEA Games
- Venue: Singapore Indoor Stadium
- Dates: 10–12 June 2015
- Competitors: 57 from 7 nations

Medalists
gold medal	Indonesia (INA)
silver medal	Thailand (THA)
bronze medal	Malaysia (MAS)
bronze medal	Singapore (SIN)

The badminton men's team tournament at the 2015 SEA Games in Singapore was held from 10 June to 12 June at the Singapore Indoor Stadium, Kallang, Singapore.

== Schedule ==
All times are Singapore Standard Time (UTC+08:00)

Date	Time	Event
Wednesday, 10 June	17:00	Quarter-final
Thursday, 11 June	17:00	Semi-final
Friday, 12 June	17:00	Gold medal match

== Results ==
Quarter-final
Malaysia (MAS)	3
Cambodia (CAM)	0
Laos (LAO)	0
Singapore (SIN)	3
Vietnam (VIE)	2
Thailand (THA)	3

Semi-Final
Indonesia (INA)	3
Malaysia (MAS)	2
Singapore (SIN)	2
Thailand (THA)	3

Final
Indonesia (INA)	3
Thailand (THA)	2

=== Quarter-final ===
10 June	Malaysia (MAS)	3–0	Cambodia (CAM)

Chong Wei Feng	2–0	Tep Chanmara	21–7, 21–11
Lee Chong Wei	2–0	Phorrom Cheng	21–10, 21–5
Tan Wee Kiong / Goh V Shem	2–0	Teav Yongvannak / Ngoun Kanora	21–8, 21–11

10 June	Laos (LAO)	0–3	Singapore (SIN)

Phanthalang Outhaithani	0–2	Derek Wong	4–21, 10–21
Meksavang Phommaly	0–2	Loh Kean Yew	5–21, 5–21
Phakornkham Fongmalayseng	0–2	Sean Lee	11–21, 10–21

10 June	Vietnam (VIE)	2–3	Thailand (THA)

Nguyễn Tiến Minh	2–1	Tanongsak Saensomboonsuk	12–21, 21–19, 23–21
Lê Hà Anh / Đào Mạnh Thắng	2–1	Pakkawat Vilailak / Wannawat Ampunsuwan	15–21, 21–17, 21–14
Phạm Cao Cường	0–2	Boonsak Ponsana	10–21, 9–21
Đỗ Tuấn Đức / Phạm Hồng Nam	0–2	Bodin Isara / Nipitphon Phuangphuapet	13–21, 12–21
Lê Hà Anh	0–2	Suppanyu Avihingsanon	10–21, 16–21

=== Semi-final ===
11 June	Indonesia (INA)	3–2	Malaysia (MAS)

Jonatan Christie	1–2	Chong Wei Feng	18–21, 21–13, 15–21
Ricky Karanda Suwardi / Angga Pratama	2–1	Tan Wee Kiong / Goh V Shem	21–17, 15–21, 21–17
Firman Abdul Kholik	0–2	Lee Chong Wei	19–21, 10–21
Kevin Sanjaya Sukamuljo / Marcus Fernaldi Gideon	2–0	Mak Hee Chun / Teo Kok Siang	21–10, 21–13
Ihsan Maulana Mustofa	2–0	Mohamad Arif Abdul Latif	21–12, 22–20

11 June	Singapore (SIN)	2–3	Thailand (THA)

Derek Wong	2–0	Tanongsak Saensomboonsuk	21–18, 21–19
Danny Bawa Chrisnanta / Chayut Triyachart	0–2	Bodin Isara / Nipitphon Phuangphuapet	11–21, 20–22
Loh Kean Yew	1–2	Boonsak Ponsana	21–17, 18–21, 10–21
Terry Hee / Hendra Wijaya	2–0	Sudket Prapakamol / Pakkawat Vilailak	21–19, 21–16
Ryan Ng	0–2	Suppanyu Avihingsanon	14–21, 11–21

=== Final ===
12 June	Indonesia (INA)	3–2	Thailand (THA)

Jonatan Christie	0–2	Tanongsak Saensomboonsuk	17–21, 19–21
Ricky Karanda Suwardi / Angga Pratama	2–0	Bodin Isara / Nipitphon Phuangphuapet	21–15, 21–13
Firman Abdul Kholik	0–2	Boonsak Ponsana	7–21, 14–21
Kevin Sanjaya Sukamuljo / Marcus Fernaldi Gideon	2–1	Pakkawat Vilailak / Wannawat Ampunsuwan	21–19, 18–21, 21–14
Ihsan Maulana Mustofa	2–1	Suppanyu Avihingsanon	20–22, 21–16, 21–9
