= Basketball at the 2015 SEA Games =

20th SEA Games Basketball Tournament
- 2015

Tournament details
- SEA Games: 2015 SEA Games
- Host nation: Singapore
- Venue: OCBC Arena Hall 1
- Duration: 9–15 June 2015

Men's tournament
- Teams: 9
Medals
Gold medalists	Philippines
Silver medalists	Indonesia
Bronze medalists	Singapore

Women's tournament
- Teams: 6
Medals
Gold medalists	Malaysia
Silver medalists	Indonesia
Bronze medalists	Thailand

Official website
- www.seagames2015.com

Tournaments
← Naypyidaw 2013	Kuala Lumpur 2017 →

Basketball at the 2015 SEA Games was held from 9 to 15 June 2015 in Kallang, Singapore. This edition featured both tournaments for men's and women's team. All matches were held in OCBC Arena Hall 1.

== Participating nations ==
A total of 178 athletes from nine nations competed in basketball at the 2015 SEA Games:

- Cambodia (12)
- Indonesia (24)
- Malaysia (24)
- Myanmar (10)
- Philippines (24)
- Singapore (24)
- Thailand (24)
- Timor-Leste (12)
- Vietnam (24)

This is based on the assumption that every team has 12 players on their roster.

== Competition schedule ==
The following is the competition schedule for the basketball competitions:

P	Preliminaries	R	Round robin	½	Semifinals	B	3rd place play-off	F	Final

Event↓/Date →	Tue 9	Wed 10	Thu 11	Fri 12	Sat 13	Sun 14	Mon 15	
Men	P	P	P	P	P	½	B	F
Women	R	R	R	R	R	R	R	

== Medalists ==
Event	Gold	Silver	Bronze
Men's tournament	Philippines Kiefer Ravena; Troy Rosario; Scottie Thompson; Baser Amer; Glenn Khobuntin; Almond Vosotros; Norbert Torres; Marcus Douthit; Mac Belo; Jio Jalalon; Kevin Ferrer; Prince Rivero	Indonesia Arki Dikania Wisnu; Mario Wuysang; Galank Gunawan; Rony Gunawan; Andrie Ekayana Santosa; Sandy Febrianysah Kurniawan; Oki Wira Sanjaya; Andakara Prastawa Dhyaksa; Ponsianus Nyoman Indrawan; Ebrahim Enguio Lopez; Adhipratama Prasetyo Putra; Christian Ronald Sitepu	Singapore Desmond Oh; Wong Wei Long; Wu Qingde; Toh Qing Huang; Leon Kwek; Liew Larry; Shengyu Lim; Khaw Yeong Wooi; Low Russel; Ng Han Bin; Delvin Goh; Chase Tan
Women's tournament	Malaysia Pang Hui Pin; Chong Yin Yin; Saw Wei Yin; Rajintiran Kalaimathi; Yaakob Nur Izzati; Lee Jo Rynn; Ng Shi Yeng; Low Magdelene Phey Chyi; Yap Fook Yee; Ting Eugene Chiau Teng; Wong Mei Chyn; Choo Sook Ping	Indonesia Agustin Elya Gradita Retong; Yosiana Rosemary Ibrahim; Hanum Fasya; Natasha Debby Christaline; Rohtriastari; Marlina Herawan; Jacklien Ibo; Yuni Anggraini; Wulan Ayu Ningrum; Yuliana Soemaryono; Gabriel Sophia; Mega Nanda Perdana Putri	Thailand Rudrodkij Supranee; Jantakan Juthamas; Chirdpetcharat Chonticha; Mathuros Juthathip; Janthabut Pattrawadee; Sangtad Suwimon; Kruatiwa Naphat; Maihom Thidaporn; Yothanan Penphan; Kunchuan Supavadee; Kaichaiyapoom Atchara; Phromrat Suree

== Medal table ==
* Host nation (Singapore)

Rank	Nation	Gold	Silver	Bronze	Total
1	Malaysia	1	0	0	1
1	Philippines	1	0	0	1
3	Indonesia	0	2	0	2
4	Singapore*	0	0	1	1
4	Thailand	0	0	1	1
Totals (5 entries)		2	2	2	6

== Results ==
=== Men ===
==== Teams ====
Group A	Group B
Philippines (holders); Malaysia; Indonesia; Timor-Leste	Thailand; Singapore (hosts); Cambodia; Myanmar; Vietnam

==== Final standing ====
Rank	Team
1st place, gold medalist(s)	Philippines
2nd place, silver medalist(s)	Indonesia
3rd place, bronze medalist(s)	Singapore
4	Thailand
5	Malaysia
6	Cambodia
7	Vietnam
8	Myanmar
9	Timor-Leste

=== Women ===
==== Teams ====
Seeded to final round

Philippines
Thailand (holders)
Malaysia
Indonesia
Vietnam
Singapore (hosts)

==== Final standing ====
Rank	Team
1st place, gold medalist(s)	Malaysia
2nd place, silver medalist(s)	Indonesia
3rd place, bronze medalist(s)	Thailand
4	Philippines
5	Singapore
6	Vietnam
