= Judo at the 2015 SEA Games =

Judo competition

- Venue: Expo Hall 2
- Dates: 6–8 June 2015
- Competitors: 82 from 9 nations

Judo at the 2015 SEA Games was held in EXPO Hall 2, Singapore from 6 to 8 June 2015.

== Participating nations ==
A total of 82 athletes from nine nations competed in judo at the 2015 Southeast Asian Games:

- Cambodia (4)
- Indonesia (10)
- Laos (10)
- Malaysia (10)
- Myanmar (10)
- Philippines (8)
- Singapore (10)
- Thailand (10)
- Vietnam (10)

== Competition schedule ==
The following is the competition schedule for the judo competitions:

E	Eliminations	F	Final

Event↓/Date →	Sat 6		Sun 7		Mon 8	
Men's 66 kg	E	F				
Men's 73 kg	E	F				
Men's 81 kg	E	F				
Men's 90 kg			E	F		
Men's 100 kg			E	F		
Men's +100 kg					E	F
Women's 52 kg	E	F				
Women's 57 kg	E	F				
Women's 63 kg			E	F		
Women's 70 kg			E	F		
Women's 78 kg			E	F		
Women's +78 kg					E	F

== Medalists ==
=== Men ===
Event	Gold	Silver	Bronze
66 kg	Mochammad Syaiful Raharjo; Indonesia	Sarawut Petsing; Thailand	Soukphaxay Sithisane; Laos
66 kg	Mochammad Syaiful Raharjo; Indonesia	Sarawut Petsing; Thailand	Mohd Farhan Uzair Mohd Fikri; Malaysia
73 kg	Masayuki Terada; Thailand	Iksan Apriyadi; Indonesia	Gilbert Ramirez; Philippines
73 kg	Masayuki Terada; Thailand	Iksan Apriyadi; Indonesia	Chong Wei Fu; Malaysia
81 kg	Gerard Christopher George; Indonesia	Nopachai Kocharat; Thailand	Bùi Minh Quân; Vietnam
81 kg	Gerard Christopher George; Indonesia	Nopachai Kocharat; Thailand	Gary Chow; Singapore
90 kg	Horas Manurung; Indonesia	Gabriel Yang; Singapore	Trần Thương; Vietnam
90 kg	Horas Manurung; Indonesia	Gabriel Yang; Singapore	Zaw Myo Oo; Myanmar
100 kg	Yan Naing Soe; Myanmar	Sitthipong Niemkunchon; Thailand	Timothy Loh; Singapore
100 kg	Yan Naing Soe; Myanmar	Sitthipong Niemkunchon; Thailand	Đặng Hào; Vietnam
+100 kg	Kunathip Yea-on; Thailand	Zin Linn Aung; Myanmar	Wee Pui Seng; Singapore
+100 kg	Kunathip Yea-on; Thailand	Zin Linn Aung; Myanmar	Khemkham Kommanivong; Laos

=== Women ===
Event	Gold	Silver	Bronze
52 kg	Nguyễn Thị Thanh Thủy; Vietnam	Phonenaly; Laos	Helen Dawa; Philippines
52 kg	Nguyễn Thị Thanh Thủy; Vietnam	Phonenaly; Laos	Kachakorn Warasiha; Thailand
57 kg	Ni Kadek Anny Pandini; Indonesia	Ang Xuan Yi; Singapore	Nguyễn Thị Thanh Trâm; Vietnam
57 kg	Ni Kadek Anny Pandini; Indonesia	Ang Xuan Yi; Singapore	Khin Khin Su; Myanmar
63 kg	Kiyomi Watanabe; Philippines	Orapin Senatham; Thailand	Tania Forichon; Singapore
63 kg	Kiyomi Watanabe; Philippines	Orapin Senatham; Thailand	Nguyễn Thị Hường; Vietnam
70 kg	Surattana Thongsri; Thailand	Phyo Swe Zin; Myanmar	Nor Izzatul Fazlia Mohamad Tahir; Malaysia
70 kg	Surattana Thongsri; Thailand	Phyo Swe Zin; Myanmar	Szalsza Maulida; Indonesia
78 kg	Nguyễn Thị Như Ý Vietnam	Aye Aye Aung; Myanmar	Sarifah Fazila Syed Salim; Malaysia
78 kg	Nguyễn Thị Như Ý Vietnam	Aye Aye Aung; Myanmar	Tiara Arta Garthia; Indonesia
+78 kg	Khin Myo Thu; Myanmar	Thonthan Satjadet; Thailand	Noor Asnida Abd Razak; Malaysia
+78 kg	Khin Myo Thu; Myanmar	Thonthan Satjadet; Thailand	Trần Thuý Duy; Vietnam

== Medal table ==
* Host nation (Singapore)

Rank	Nation	Gold	Silver	Bronze	Total
1	Indonesia	4	1	2	7
2	Thailand	3	5	1	9
3	Myanmar	2	3	2	7
4	Vietnam	2	0	6	8
5	Philippines	1	0	2	3
6	Singapore*	0	2	4	6
7	Laos	0	1	2	3
8	Malaysia	0	0	5	5
Totals (8 entries)		12	12	24	48
