= Philip Joper Escueta =

Filipino badminton player (born 1993)

Personal information
- Born: August 23, 1993 (age 32) Pila, Laguna, Philippines
- Height: 1.72 m (5 ft 8 in)

Sport
- Country: Philippines
- Sport: Badminton
- Handedness: Right

Men's doubles
- Highest ranking: 56 (23 September 2015)
- Current ranking: 209 (6 September 2022)
- BWF profile
Medal record
Men's badminton
Representing Philippines
Southeast Asian Games
Bronze medal – third place	2015 Singapore	Men's doubles

Philip Joper Escueta (born August 23, 1993) is a Filipino badminton player. Escueta and his partner in men's doubles, Ronel Estanislao, won a bronze medal in the 2015 Southeast Asian Games. Escueta currently coaches the Philippines national badminton team.

== Career ==
In his junior days, he played in the men's singles discipline and competed in a few BWF Superseries tournaments. In 2011, he competed in the 2011 BWF World Junior Championships.

Philip made his transition to playing men's doubles fully in 2012. He also represented the Philippines in the world mixed team tournament, also known as the Sudirman Cup.

In 2015, he competed in the 2015 Southeast Asian Games in Singapore. He and his partner Ronel Estanislao unexpectedly beat home favourites Terry Hee and Hendra Wijaya in the first round. They would go onto beating Ngoun Kanora and Teav Yongvannak in the quarterfinals and guaranteed themselves a bronze medal. They lost the semifinal to world number 1 pair of Marcus Fernaldi Gideon and Kevin Sanjaya Sukamuljo. This is his biggest career achievement to date.

== Achievements ==
=== Southeast Asian Games ===
Men's doubles

Year	Venue	Partner	Opponent	Score	Result
2015	Singapore Indoor Stadium, Singapore	(Philippines) Ronel Estanislao	(Indonesia) Marcus Fernaldi Gideon (Indonesia) Kevin Sanjaya Sukamuljo	14–21, 12–21	Bronze
