= Equestrian at the 2015 SEA Games =

- Venue: Singapore Turf Club Riding Centre
- Dates: 6–10 June 2015
- Competitors: 38 from 8 nations

Equestrian at the 2015 Southeast Asian Games was held in Singapore Turf Club Riding Centre, Singapore from 6 to 10 June 2015. Medals were awarded in second disciplines for both individual and team competitions.

== Participating nations ==
A total of 38 athletes from eight nations competed in equestrian at the 2015 Southeast Asian Games:

- Brunei (1)
- Cambodia (4)
- Indonesia (6)
- Malaysia (7)
- Myanmar (4)
- Philippines (4)
- Singapore (8)
- Thailand (4)

== Competition schedule ==
The following is the competition schedule for the equestrian competitions:

| Q | Qualification | F | Final |

| Event↓/Date → | Sat 6 | Sun 7 | Mon 8 | Tue 9 | Wed 10 |
|---|---|---|---|---|---|
| Individual dressage | | Q | | F | |
| Team dressage | F | | | | |
| Individual jumping | | | | | F |
| Team jumping | | | F | | |

== Medalists ==
| Event | Gold | Silver | Bronze |
|---|---|---|---|
| Individual dressage | Larasati Iris Richka Gading on Wallenstein 145 (INA) | Caroline Chew Pei-Jia on Tribiani (SIN) | Alfaro Menayang on Desperado 172 (INA) |
| Team dressage | Indonesia (INA); Larasati Iris Richka Gading on Wallenstein 145; Ferry Wahyu Hadiyanto on Douceur 3 Dewi Kunti Njoto on Don Alvarito; Alfaro Menayang on Desperado 172 | Singapore (SIN); Caroline Chew Pei-Jia on Tribiani; Catherine Oh Yung-Wen on Vlicka; Soh Wei Chi on Mirabel Hojris; Natalie Pinruo Tan on Romaniero | Malaysia (MAS); Shaiful Azwan Mohamad Din on Thor de Martinpre; Mohd Izry Razali on Cookie 'n Cream; Natalya Aira Wah Idris on Tallong Coral |
| Individual jumping | Sharmini Christina Ratnasingham on Arcado L (MAS) | Catherine Chew Yen-Tu on Coquira (SIN) | Sailub Lertratanachai on Cagena Z (THA) |
| Team jumping | Singapore (SIN); Cheong Su-Yen on Claim Collin; Catherine Chew Yen-Tu on Coquira; Janine Khoo Su Pheng on Snoopnose; Predrag Marjanovic on Calypso 419 | Malaysia (MAS); Ahmad Imtaz Amir Hamzah on PRTC Gin Fizz van de Gasthoeve; Mohammad Nabil Fikri Ismail on Urgola; Sharmini Christina Ratnasingham on Arcado L Natasha Ines Wah Idris on Wachintha | Thailand (THA); Sailub Lertratanachai on Cagena Z Siengsaw Lertratanachai on Dakota; Korntawat Samran on Amadeus 882 |

== Medal table ==
* Host nation (Singapore)

| Rank | Nation | Gold | Silver | Bronze | Total |
|---|---|---|---|---|---|
| 1 | Indonesia (INA) | 2 | 0 | 1 | 3 |
| 2 | Singapore (SIN)* | 1 | 3 | 0 | 4 |
| 3 | Malaysia (MAS) | 1 | 1 | 1 | 3 |
| 4 | Thailand (THA) | 0 | 0 | 2 | 2 |
| Totals (4 entries) | | 4 | 4 | 4 | 12 |
