= Pencak silat at the 2015 SEA Games =

- Venue: Expo Hall 2
- Dates: 10 June 2015 to 14 June 2015
- Competitors: 107 from 9 nations

Pencak silat at the 2015 SEA Games was held at the Singapore Expo Hall 2, Singapore from 10 to 14 June 2015.

== Participating nations ==
A total of 107 athletes from nine nations will be competing in pencak silat at the 2015 SEA Games:

- Brunei (7)
- Indonesia (16)
- Laos (9)
- Malaysia (16)
- Philippines (5)
- Singapore (14)
- Thailand (16)
- Timor-Leste (8)
- Vietnam (16)

== Medalists ==
=== Seni ===
Event	Gold	Silver	Bronze
Men's singles	Hoàng Quang Trung; Vietnam	Sugianto; Indonesia	Muhammad Iqbal Abdul Rahman; Singapore
Men's doubles	Indonesia; Hendy; Yolla Primadona Jampil	Vietnam; Đặng Quốc Bảo; Nguyễn Danh Phương	Singapore; Muhammad Shakir Juanda; Sheik Ferdous Sheik Alau'ddin
Women's team	Indonesia; Ni Kadek Ratna Dewi; Ida Ayu Putu Chandra Martiadi; Luh Putu Eka Pratiwi	Singapore; Nurul Khairunnisa Azlani; Nur Fazlin Juma'en; Nur Shafiqa Sheik Alau'ddin	Vietnam; Dương Thị Ánh Nguyệt; Nguyễn Thị Thu Hà; Nguyễn Thị Thúy

=== Tanding ===
==== Men ====
Event	Gold	Silver	Bronze
Class A 50 kg	Diệp Ngọc Vũ Minh; Vietnam	Awaluddin Nur; Indonesia	Alshamier Ibnohisham; Philippines
Class A 50 kg	Diệp Ngọc Vũ Minh; Vietnam	Awaluddin Nur; Indonesia	Arieffudin Ridzuan; Malaysia
Class B 55 kg	Muhammad Faizul M Nasir; Malaysia	Nanthachai Khansakhon; Thailand	Aprin Ardianto; Indonesia
Class B 55 kg	Muhammad Faizul M Nasir; Malaysia	Nanthachai Khansakhon; Thailand	Võ Duy Phương; Vietnam
Class C 60 kg	Adilan Chemaeng; Thailand	Nguyễn Thái Linh; Vietnam	Toto Thammavong; Laos
Class C 60 kg	Adilan Chemaeng; Thailand	Nguyễn Thái Linh; Vietnam	Ahmad Shahrozli Zailudin; Malaysia
Class D 65 kg	Pornteb Poolkaew; Thailand	Muhammad Fahmi Romli; Malaysia	Noukhith Latsaphao; Laos
Class D 65 kg	Pornteb Poolkaew; Thailand	Muhammad Fahmi Romli; Malaysia	Sapto Purnomo; Indonesia
Class E 70 kg	Mohd Al Jufferi Jamari; Malaysia	Vũ Văn Hoàng; Vietnam	Mohamad Kifli Hamzah; Brunei
Class E 70 kg	Mohd Al Jufferi Jamari; Malaysia	Vũ Văn Hoàng; Vietnam	Sheik Ferdous Sheik Alau'ddin; Singapore
Class F 75 kg	Muhammad Nur Alfian Juma'en; Singapore	Trần Đình Nam; Vietnam	Mohd Fauzi Khalid; Malaysia
Class F 75 kg	Muhammad Nur Alfian Juma'en; Singapore	Trần Đình Nam; Vietnam	Ryan Sazali; Indonesia
Class H 85 kg	Tri Juanda Samsul Bahar; Indonesia	Muhammad Robial Sobri; Malaysia	Juanilio Ballesta II; Philippines
Class H 85 kg	Tri Juanda Samsul Bahar; Indonesia	Muhammad Robial Sobri; Malaysia	Sheik Farhan Sheik Alau'ddin; Singapore

==== Women ====
Event	Gold	Silver	Bronze
Class B 55 kg	Suda Lueangaphichat; Thailand	Olathay Sounthavong; Laos	Nur Shafiqa Sheik Alau'ddin; Singapore
Class B 55 kg	Suda Lueangaphichat; Thailand	Olathay Sounthavong; Laos	Nirmalasari Octaviani; Indonesia
Class C 60 kg	Hoàng Thị Loan; Vietnam	Wewey Wita; Indonesia	Nong Oy Vongphakdy; Laos
Class C 60 kg	Hoàng Thị Loan; Vietnam	Wewey Wita; Indonesia	Clyde Joy Baria; Philippines
Class D 65 kg	Siti Rahmah Mohamed Nasir; Malaysia	Nguyễn Thị Yến; Vietnam	Selly Andriani; Indonesia
Class D 65 kg	Siti Rahmah Mohamed Nasir; Malaysia	Nguyễn Thị Yến; Vietnam	Nurul Suhaila; Singapore

== Medal table ==
* Host nation (Singapore)

Rank	Nation	Gold	Silver	Bronze	Total
1	Vietnam (VIE)	3	5	2	10
2	Indonesia (INA)	3	3	5	11
3	Malaysia (MAS)	3	2	3	8
4	Thailand (THA)	3	1	0	4
5	Singapore (SIN)*	1	1	6	8
6	Laos (LAO)	0	1	3	4
7	Philippines (PHI)	0	0	3	3
8	Brunei (BRU)	0	0	1	1
Totals (8 entries)		13	13	23	49
