= Caroline Chew (equestrian) =

Singaporean equestrian

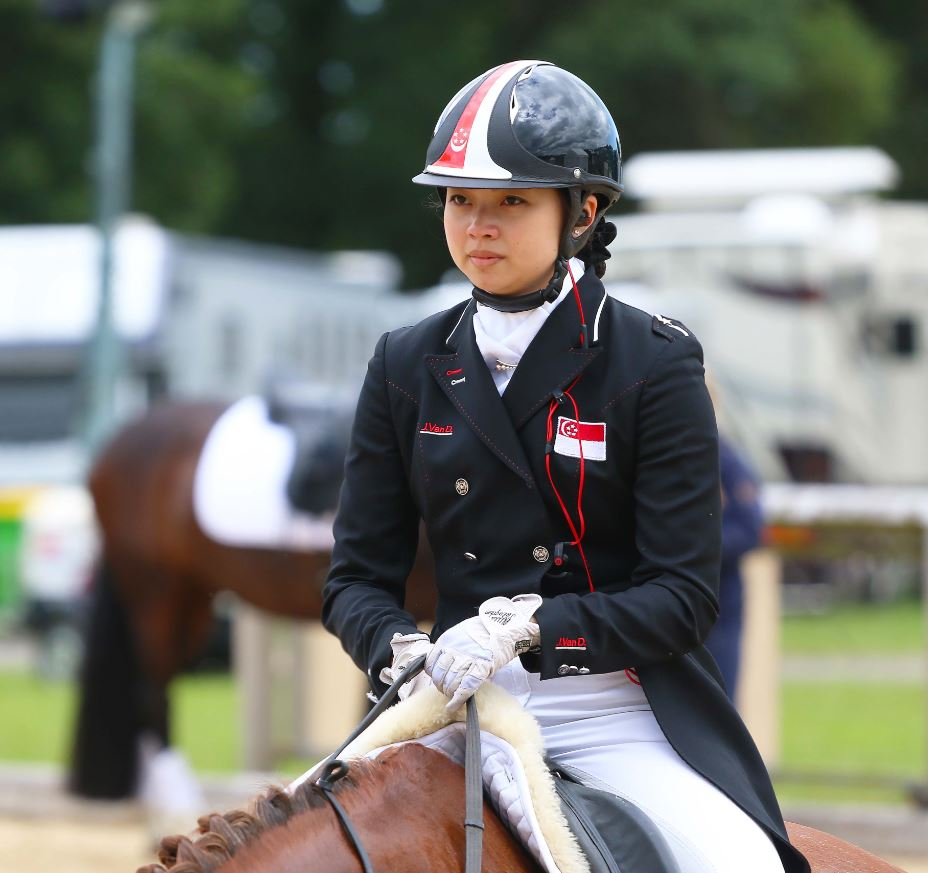
- Chew in 2018

Personal information
- Full name: Caroline Rosanna Pei Jia Chew
- Born: 18 April 1992 (age 34); Singapore
Medal record
Equestrian
Representing Singapore
Southeast Asian Games
Silver medal – second place	2015 Singapore	Team dressage
Silver medal – second place	2015 Singapore	Individual dressage
Bronze medal – third place	2013 Naypiydaw	Team dressage
Bronze medal – third place	2017 Kuang Rawang	Team dressage
Bronze medal – third place	2017 Kuang Rawang	Individual dressage

Caroline Rosanna Pei Jia Chew (born 18 April 1992) is a Singaporean equestrian athlete and solicitor. She competed at the 2018 World Equestrian Games and the 2014 Asian Games in dressage, and at the 2010 Youth Olympic Games in show jumping. She won several medals during the Southeast Asian Games (from 2013 through 2017), and competed at the 2020 Summer Olympics.

== Biography ==
Chew started riding at the age of six. At the Singapore 2010 Youth Olympic Games, she competed in show jumping and placed 17th. Chew was selected to be the first athlete to present the Olympic oath at the Youth Olympic Games.

Chew later switched from show jumping to dressage, and became the most successful dressage rider for Singapore and the first Singaporean to compete at Grand Prix level, which is the highest in dressage. She competed as the first Singaporean dressage rider at the 2018 World Equestrian Games in Tryon, where she ranked 56th.

Following the withdrawal of New Zealand's rider from the 2020 Tokyo Olympic Games, a replacement rider was to be chosen from the Dressage Grand Prix held in Le Mans, France. Chew went to the Grand Prix and posted a personal best score of 69.674 and qualified for the Olympics. She is the first Singaporean equestrian athlete to participate at the Olympic Games. However, Chew was eliminated from the Games as her horse Tribiani was found to be bleeding from the mouth, caused by a stumble before the competition.

== Personal life ==
Caroline Chew studied law at the Bristol University in England. Currently she lives in London and works full-time as a lawyer at Freshfields Bruckhaus Deringer, which she combines with horse riding.

Her mother, Melanie, also served as the president of the Equestrian Federation of Singapore from 2007 to 2017. Her older sister Catherine Chew is a successful show-jumper, who won individual silver and team gold during the 2015 Southeast Asian Games held in Singapore.
