= Golf at the 2015 SEA Games =

- Venue: Sentosa Golf Club
- Dates: 9–12 June 2015
- Competitors: 56 from 10 nations

Golf at the 2015 SEA Games were held in Sentosa Golf Club, Singapore from 9 to 12 June 2015. Four competitions were held: both men and women's individual and team.

== Participating nations ==
A total of 56 athletes from 10 nations competed in golf at the 2015 Southeast Asian Games:

- Brunei (1)
- Cambodia (4)
- Indonesia (7)
- Laos (4)
- Malaysia (7)
- Myanmar (7)
- Philippines (7)
- Singapore (7)
- Thailand (7)
- Vietnam (5)

== Competition schedule ==
The following is the competition schedule for the golf competitions:

R1	Round 1	R2	Round 2	R3	Round 3	R4	Round 4/Final

Event↓/Date →	Tue 9	Wed 10	Thu 11	Fri 12
Men's individual	R1	R2	R3	R4
Men's team	R1	R2	R3	R4
Women's individual		R1	R2	R3
Women's team		R1	R2	R3

== Medalists ==
Event	Gold	Silver	Bronze
Men's individual	Natipong Srithong; Thailand	Johnson Poh Swee Kiat; Singapore	Tawan Phongphun; Thailand
Men's team	Thailand (THA); Kasidit Lepkurte; Tawan Phongphun; Natipong Srithong; Sarit Suwannarut	Singapore (SIN); Marc Chong Ching Ong; Johnson Poh Swee Kiat; Abdul Hadi Uda Thith; Jonathan Ke-Jun Woo	Indonesia (INA); Kevin Cesario Akbar; Rizchy Subakti Pramana Putra; Fadhli Rahman Soetarso; Tirto Tamardi
Women's individual	Suthavee Chanachai; Thailand	Rivani Adelia Sihotang; Indonesia	Koh Sock Hwee; Singapore
Women's team	Thailand (THA); Pajaree Anannarukarn; Suthavee Chanachai; Benyapa Niphatsophon	Indonesia (INA); Ida Ayu Indira Melati Putri; Rivani Adelia Sihotang; Tatiana J. Wijaya	Singapore (SIN); Goh Jen; Koh Sock Hwee; Amanda Tan

== Medal table ==
* Host nation (Singapore)

Rank	Nation	Gold	Silver	Bronze	Total
1	Thailand (THA)	4	0	1	5
2	Singapore (SIN)*	0	2	2	4
3	Indonesia (INA)	0	2	1	3
Totals (3 entries)		4	4	4	12
