= Brunei at the 2015 SEA Games =

Brunei at the 2015 Southeast Asian Games
- IOC code: BRU
- NOC: Brunei Darussalam National Olympic Council
- Website: www.bruneiolympic.org

in Singapore
- Flag bearer: Faustina Woo Wai Sii
- Officials: 82
- Medals Ranked 10th: Gold 0 Silver 1 Bronze 6 Total 7

Southeast Asian Games appearances (overview)
- 1977; 1979; 1981; 1983; 1985; 1987; 1989; 1991; 1993; 1995; 1997; 1999; 2001; 2003; 2005; 2007; 2009; 2011; 2013; 2015; 2017; 2019; 2021; 2023; 2025; 2027; 2029

Brunei competed in the 2015 Southeast Asian Games from 5 to 16 June 2015.

== Competitors ==
Sport	Men	Women	Total
Athletics	6	0	6
Billiards and snooker	2	0	2
Equestrian	1	0	1
Fencing	4	0	4
Football	29	0	29
Golf	1	0	1
Netball	0	12	12
Pencak silat	4	3	7
Pétanque	4	0	4
Sailing	2	0	2
Sepak takraw	8	0	8
Taekwondo	0	1	1
Wushu	2	3	5
Total	63	19	82

== Medal summary ==
=== Medal by sport ===
Medals by sport
Sport	1st place, gold medalist(s)	2nd place, silver medalist(s)	3rd place, bronze medalist(s)	Total
Netball	0	0	1	1
Pencak silat	0	0	1	1
Sepak takraw	0	0	2	2
Taekwondo	0	1	0	1
Wushu	0	0	2	2
Total	0	1	6	7

=== Medal by date ===
Medals by date
Day	Date	1st place, gold medalist(s)	2nd place, silver medalist(s)	3rd place, bronze medalist(s)	Total
–3	2 June	0	0	0	0
–2	3 June	0	0	0	0
–1	4 June	0	0	0	0
0	5 June	0	0	0	0
1	6 June	0	0	2	2
2	7 June	0	0	3	3
3	8 June	0	0	0	0
4	9 June	0	0	0	0
5	10 June	0	0	0	0
6	11 June	0	0	0	0
7	12 June	0	0	0	0
8	13 June	0	0	1	1
9	14 June	0	1	0	1
10	15 June	0	0	0	0
11	16 June	0	0	0	0
Total		0	1	6	7

=== Medalists ===
Medal	Name	Sport	Event	Date
Silver	Nurulain Md Ja'afar	Taekwando	Women's under 62kg	14 June
Bronze	Nurrafiqah Afifi Abdullah; Siti Marhayati Ahmad; Syafiqah Niqmatullah Amraan; Nur Hafizah Haji Abdul Sidek; Hajah Siti Shamsiah Haji Sajali; Nur Syuhaidah Fahriyana Hj Sukri; Siti Norsaihah Mohammad Adi Najmi; Athiyyah As'ad Mohd Jafar; Dk Khalisha Pg Abd Rahman; Dk Nur Amal Nadhirah Pg Md Ali; Siti Nur Syaahidah Rashid; Nursazwilla Rosdie	Netball	Women	7 June
Bronze	Mohamad Kifli Hamzah	Pencak Silat	Men's tanding class E	13 June
Bronze	Ismail Ang; Mohammad Hafizzudin Jamaludin; Jamaludin Awang Haji Marzi; Nur Alimin Sungoh; Mohammad Sukri Jaineh; Zatie Hidayat Saidi; Humaidi Brahim; Muhammad Basyiruddin Haji Kamis	Sepak takraw	Non-repetition primary	7 June
Bronze	Ismail Ang; Mohammad Hafizzudin Jamaludin; Jamaludin Awang Haji Marzi; Nur Alimin Sungoh; Mohammad Sukri Jaineh; Zatie Hidayat Saidi; Humaidi Brahim; Muhammad Basyiruddin Haji Kamis	Sepak takraw	Same stroke	7 June
Bronze	Md Sufi Shayiran Roslan; Mohammad Adi Sya'Rani Roslan	Wushu	Men's taolu	6 June
Bronze	Faustina Woo Wai Sii; Lee Ying Shi	Wushu	Women's taolu	6 June
