= Rowing at the 2015 SEA Games =

Rowing regatta

- Venue: Marina Channel
- Dates: 11–14 June 2015
- Competitors: 173 from 7 nations

Rowing at the 2015 SEA Games was held in Marina Channel, Singapore from 11 to 14 June 2015.

== Participating nations ==
A total of 173 athletes from seven nations will be competing in rowing at the 2015 Southeast Asian Games:

- Indonesia (32)
- Malaysia (12)
- Myanmar (40)
- Philippines (7)
- Singapore (24)
- Thailand (37)
- Vietnam (21)

== Competition schedule ==
The following is the competition schedule for the rowing competitions:

| H | Heats | R | Repechage | F | Final |

| Event↓/Date → | Thu 11 | Fri 12 | Sat 13 | Sun 14 |
|---|---|---|---|---|
| Men's single sculls 500 m | F | | | |
| Men's single sculls 1,000 m | | H | R | F |
| Men's lightweight single sculls 500 m | F | | | |
| Men's lightweight single sculls 1,000 m | | H | R | F |
| Men's lightweight doubles sculls 500 m | F | | | |
| Men's lightweight doubles sculls 1,000 m | | H | R | F |
| Men's lightweight four 500 m | F | | | |
| Men's lightweight four 1,000 m | | H | R | F |
| Men's pair 500 m | F | | | |
| Men's pair 1,000 m | | H | R | F |
| Men's eight 1,000 m | | H | R | F |
| Women's lightweight single sculls 500 m | F | | | |
| Women's lightweight single sculls 1,000 m | | H | R | F |
| Women's lightweight doubles sculls 500 m | F | | | |
| Women's lightweight doubles sculls 1,000 m | | H | R | F |
| Women's lightweight four 1,000 m | | H | R | F |
| Women's pair 500 m | F | | | |
| Women's pair 1,000 m | | H | R | F |

== Medalists ==
=== Men ===
| Event | Gold | Silver | Bronze |
|---|---|---|---|
| Single sculls 500 m | Memo; Indonesia | Min Aung Ko; Myanmar | Prem Nampratueng; Thailand |
| Single sculls 1000 m | Memo; Indonesia | Nestor Cordova; Philippines | Min Aung Ko; Myanmar |
| Lightweight single sculls 500 m | Nguyễn Văn Linh; Vietnam | Ardi Isadi; Indonesia | Jaruwat Saensuk; Thailand |
| Lightweight single sculls 1000 m | Nguyễn Văn Linh; Vietnam | Jaruwat Saensuk; Thailand | Ardi Isadi; Indonesia |
| Lightweight doubles sculls 500 m | Thailand; Porntawat Inlee; Ruthtanapol Theppibal | Vietnam; Nguyễn Văn Đức; Nguyễn Văn Tuấn | Indonesia; Arief; Ihram |
| Lightweight doubles sculls 1000 m | Indonesia; Arief; Ihram | Vietnam; Nguyễn Văn Đức; Nguyễn Văn Tuấn | Philippines; Benjamin Tolentino, Jr. Edgar Ilas |
| Lightweight four 500 m | Indonesia; Denri Maulidzar Al Ghiffari; Muhad Yakin; Rendi Syuhada Anugrah; Mochamad Ali Darta Lakiki | Vietnam; Trần Đăng Dung; Pham Minh Chính; Tràn Quang Tùng; Trần Ngọc Đức | Myanmar; Soe Thet Naing; Thu Zaw Myo; Soe Wai Yen Htet; Myo Nyein Zaw |
| Lightweight four 1000 m | Indonesia; Denri Maulidzar Al Ghiffari; Muhad Yakin; Rendi Syuhada Anugrah; Mochamad Ali Darta Lakiki | Singapore; Syahir Ezekiel Rafa'ee; Pek Hong Kiat; Lee Zong Han; Nadzrie Hyckell Hamzah | Vietnam; Trần Đăng Dung; Pham Minh Chính; Tràn Quang Tùng; Trần Ngọc Đức |
| Pair 500 m | Vietnam; Nguyễn Đình Huy; Đàm Văn Hiếu | Indonesia; Budi Santoso; Tanzil Hadid | Myanmar; Sam Myint; Hlam Saw Wai |
| Pair 1000 m | Indonesia; Budi Santoso; Tanzil Hadid | Vietnam; Nguyễn Đình Huy; Đàm Văn Hiếu | Malaysia; Mazlie Daham; Mohd Zulfadli Rozali |
| Eight 1000 m | Indonesia; Mahendra Yanto; Muhammad Rais Mahu; Agus Budy Aji; Wiko; Adi Ardiansyah; Arfin; Edwin Ginanjar Rudiana; Ferdiansyah; Jarudin | Thailand; Nuttapong Sampromcharee; Pichakorn Puangpet; Poonlap Maigerd; Sitthakarn Painsawan; Chaichana Thakum; Somporn Mueangkhot; Sakon Somwat; Nawamin Deenoi; Weerawat Srichai | Myanmar; Soe Htay Hlaing; Oo Aung Naing; Aung Zaw; Say Saw Htoo; Thu Ye Kyaw; Thu Aung Myat; Naing Kyi; Min Kyaw; Oo Tin Maung |

=== Women ===
| Event | Gold | Silver | Bronze |
|---|---|---|---|
| Lightweight single sculls 500 m | Maryam Makdalena Daimoi; Indonesia | Phuttaraksa Neegree; Thailand | Saiyidah Aisyah; Singapore |
| Lightweight single sculls 1000 m | Phuttaraksa Neegree; Thailand | Maryam Makdalena Daimoi; Indonesia | Saiyidah Aisyah; Singapore |
| Lightweight doubles sculls 500 m | Vietnam; Tạ Thanh Huyền; Phạm Thị Thảo | Myanmar; Win Nilar; Latt Shwe Zin | Indonesia; Yuniarty; Wahyuni |
| Lightweight doubles sculls 1000 m | Vietnam; Tạ Thanh Huyền; Phạm Thị Thảo | Thailand; Tippaporn Pitukpaothai; Rojjana Raklao | Indonesia; Natalia Latupeirissa; Susanti |
| Lightweight four 1000 m | Vietnam; Cao Thị Hảo; Phạm Thị Huệ; Trần Thị An; Nguyễn Thị Trinh | Indonesia; Chelsea Corputty; Wahyuni; Yayah Rokayah; Yuniarty | Thailand; Kritiyya Harirak; Patchareeya Jardsakul; Sawittree Laksoongnoen; Matinee Raruen |
| Pair 500 m | Vietnam; Lê Thị An; Phạm Thị Huệ | Indonesia; Syiva Lisdiana; Wa Ode Fitri Rahmanjani | Myanmar; Thuzar Aye; Win Yi Yi |
| Pair 1000 m | Vietnam; Lê Thị An; Phạm Thị Huệ | Indonesia; Syiva Lisdiana; Wa Ode Fitri Rahmanjani | Singapore; Chan Lai Cheng; Joan Poh Xue Hua |

== Medal table ==
* Host nation (Singapore)

| Rank | Nation | Gold | Silver | Bronze | Total |
|---|---|---|---|---|---|
| 1 | Indonesia (INA) | 8 | 6 | 4 | 18 |
| 2 | Vietnam (VIE) | 8 | 4 | 1 | 13 |
| 3 | Thailand (THA) | 2 | 4 | 3 | 9 |
| 4 | Myanmar (MYA) | 0 | 2 | 5 | 7 |
| 5 | Singapore (SIN)* | 0 | 1 | 3 | 4 |
| 6 | Philippines (PHI) | 0 | 1 | 1 | 2 |
| 7 | Malaysia (MAS) | 0 | 0 | 1 | 1 |
| Totals (7 entries) | | 18 | 18 | 18 | 54 |
