= Daniel Parantac =

Filipino wushu practitioner

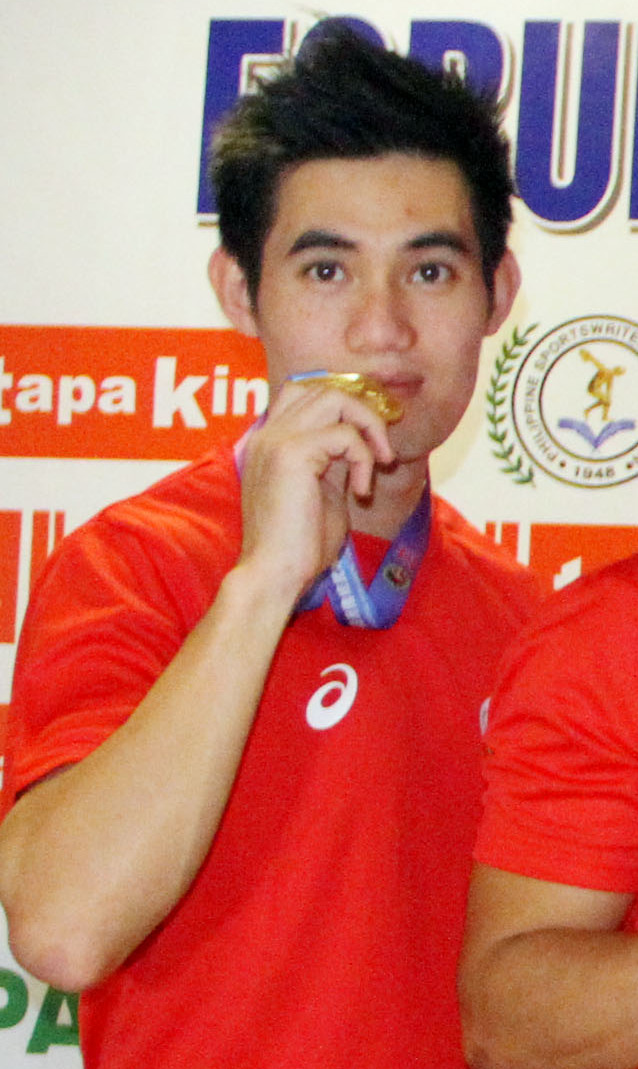
- Parantac in 2018

Personal information
- Nationality: Filipino
- Born: November 4, 1990 (age 35)
- Education: University of the Cordilleras

Sport
- Country: Philippines
- Sport: Wushu
- Event(s): Taijiquan, Taijijian, Duilian
Medal record
Wushu
Representing Philippines
| Event | 1st | 2nd | 3rd |
|---|---|---|---|
| Asian Games | 0 | 1 | 0 |
| World Wushu Championships | 0 | 1 | 2 |
| Southeast Asian Games | 2 | 4 | 1 |
| Total | 2 | 6 | 3 |
Asian Games
| Silver medal – second place | 2014 Incheon | Taijiquan |
World Wushu Championships
| Silver medal – second place | 2013 Kuala Lumpur | Duilian |
| Bronze medal – third place | 2011 Ankara | Taijijian |
| Bronze medal – third place | 2013 Kuala Lumpur | Taijiquan |
Southeast Asian Games
| Gold medal – first place | 2013 Naypyidaw | Taijiquan & Taijijian All-Round |
| Gold medal – first place | 2015 Singapore | Taijijian |
| Silver medal – second place | 2011 Jakarta | Taijiquan & Taijijian All-Round |
| Silver medal – second place | 2013 Naypyidaw | Duilian with Weapon |
| Silver medal – second place | 2015 Singapore | Weapons |
| Silver medal – second place | 2015 Singapore | Taijiquan |
| Bronze medal – third place | 2019 Manila | Taijiquan |
- Updated on December 2, 2019

Daniel Parantac (born November 4, 1990) is a Filipino wushu practitioner. He has represented the Philippines in various wushu international competitions and won several medals. He was named Athlete of the Year at the 2013 Kafagway Sports Achievers Awards. He was the silver medalist in the men's taijiquan and taijijian all-round competition at the 2014 Asian Games in Incheon, South Korea. He studied at the University of the Cordilleras for his higher education.
