= Taekwondo at the 2015 SEA Games =

Taekwondo competition

- Venue: Expo Hall 2
- Dates: 12 June 2015 to 14 June 2015
- Competitors: 104 from 11 nations

Taekwondo at the 2015 SEA Games was held in Singapore EXPO Hall 2, Singapore from 12 to 14 June 2015.

== Participating nations ==
A total of 104 athletes from 11 nations will be competing in taekwondo at the 2015 Southeast Asian Games:

- Brunei (1)
- Cambodia (10)
- Indonesia (10)
- Laos (12)
- Malaysia (10)
- Myanmar (9)
- Philippines (12)
- Singapore (8)
- Thailand (14)
- Timor-Leste (4)
- Vietnam (14)

== Medalists ==
=== Poomsae ===
==== Men ====
Event	Gold	Silver	Bronze
Men's singles	Kang Rui Jie; Singapore	Maulana Haidir; Indonesia	Yong Jin Kun; Malaysia
Men's singles	Kang Rui Jie; Singapore	Maulana Haidir; Indonesia	Phal Sovannat; Cambodia
Women's singles	Chelsea Sim; Singapore	Rinna Babanto; Philippines	Mutiara Habiba; Indonesia
Women's singles	Chelsea Sim; Singapore	Rinna Babanto; Philippines	Kidavone Philavong; Laos
Men's team	Philippines; Dustin Jacob Mella; Rodolfo Reyes Jr. Raphael Enrico Mella	Vietnam; Lê Hiếu Nghĩa; Lê Thanh Trung; Nguyễn Thiên Phụng	Indonesia; Muhammad Fazza Fitracahyanto; Maulana Haidir; Muhammad Abdurrahman Wahyu
Men's team	Philippines; Dustin Jacob Mella; Rodolfo Reyes Jr. Raphael Enrico Mella	Vietnam; Lê Hiếu Nghĩa; Lê Thanh Trung; Nguyễn Thiên Phụng	Malaysia; Chew Wei Yan; Kok Jun Ee; Yong Jin Kun
Women's team	Vietnam; Châu Tuyết Vân; Nguyễn Thị Lệ Kim; Nguyễn Thụy Xuân Linh	Thailand; Katesara Kiatatchawachai; Wanida Raksasri; Pich-Chapha Tanakitcharoenpat	not awarded
Mixed pair	Vietnam; Nguyễn Minh Văn; Nguyễn Minh Tú	Malaysia; Kok Jun Ee; Yap Khim Wen	Singapore; Kang Rui Jie; Chelsea Sim
Mixed pair	Vietnam; Nguyễn Minh Văn; Nguyễn Minh Tú	Malaysia; Kok Jun Ee; Yap Khim Wen	Thailand; Sattawath Chomchuen; Tasana Manso

=== Kyorugi ===
==== Men ====
Event	Gold	Silver	Bronze
54 kg	Reinaldy Atmanegara; Indonesia	Muhammad Danial Mohd Azri; Malaysia	Ng Ming Wei; Singapore
54 kg	Reinaldy Atmanegara; Indonesia	Muhammad Danial Mohd Azri; Malaysia	Jenar Torillos; Philippines
58 kg	Nguyễn Văn Duy; Vietnam	Francis Aaron Agojo; Philippines	Nutthawee Klompong; Thailand
58 kg	Nguyễn Văn Duy; Vietnam	Francis Aaron Agojo; Philippines	Junwei Tan Jason; Singapore
63 kg	Akkarin Kitwijarn; Thailand	Zaw; Myanmar	Phouthasone Thammavong; Laos
63 kg	Akkarin Kitwijarn; Thailand	Zaw; Myanmar	Vincent Hong Bin Lim; Singapore
68 kg	Samuel Morrison; Philippines	Phan Trung Đức; Vietnam	Somsanouk Phommavanh; Laos
68 kg	Samuel Morrison; Philippines	Phan Trung Đức; Vietnam	Thinagaran Naidu Papunaidu; Malaysia
74 kg	Peerathep Sila-On; Thailand	Khir Amir Salam Mohd Sulaiman; Malaysia	not awarded

==== Women ====
Event	Gold	Silver	Bronze
46 kg	Trương Thị Kim Tuyến; Vietnam	Irene Therese Bermejo; Philippines	Wilasinee Khamsribusa; Thailand
46 kg	Trương Thị Kim Tuyến; Vietnam	Irene Therese Bermejo; Philippines	Chew Xin Wei; Singapore
49 kg	Chanatip Sonkham; Thailand	Luisa Dos Santos Rosa; Timor-Leste	Levita Ronna Ilao; Philippines
49 kg	Chanatip Sonkham; Thailand	Luisa Dos Santos Rosa; Timor-Leste	Nur Fadzlyn Mohd Zahruddin; Singapore
53 kg	Mariska Halinda; Indonesia	Phannapa Harnsujin; Thailand	Chhoeung Puthearim; Cambodia
53 kg	Mariska Halinda; Indonesia	Phannapa Harnsujin; Thailand	Wai Mar Soe; Myanmar
57 kg	Pauline Lopez; Philippines	Phạm Thị Thu Hiền; Vietnam	Sonesavanh Sirimanotham; Laos
57 kg	Pauline Lopez; Philippines	Phạm Thị Thu Hiền; Vietnam	Annisa Cinthya Medina; Indonesia
62 kg	Hà Thị Nguyên; Vietnam	Nurulain Md Ja'afar; Brunei	not awarded

== Results ==
=== Women ===
==== Under 57 kg ====
Quarterfinal
Phạm Thị Thu Hiền (VIE)	14
Oo December (MYA)	2

Semifinals
Annisa Cinthya Medina (INA)	1
Phạm Thị Thu Hiền (VIE)	14
Pauline Louise Lopez (PHI)	21
Sirimanotham Sonesavanh (LAO)	2

Final
Phạm Thị Thu Hiền (VIE)	12
Pauline Louise Lopez (PHI)	20

==== Under 62 kg ====
Semifinals		Final
		Md Ja’afar Nurulain (BRU)	0
Sotthachit Thidasavanh (LAO)	2	Hà Thị Nguyên (VIE)	22
Hà Thị Nguyên (VIE)	15

==== Individual Poomsae ====
Rank	Athlete	Score
1st place, gold medalist(s)	Chelsea Sim (SIN)	8.000
2nd place, silver medalist(s)	Rinna Babanto (PHI)	7.480
3rd place, bronze medalist(s)	Mutiara Habiba (INA)	7.365
3rd place, bronze medalist(s)	Kidavone Philavong (LAO)	7.350
5	Thet Myat Noe Wai (MYA)	7.250

== Medal table ==
* Host nation (Singapore)

Rank	Nation	Gold	Silver	Bronze	Total
1	Vietnam (VIE)	5	3	0	8
2	Philippines (PHI)	3	3	2	8
3	Thailand (THA)	3	2	3	8
4	Indonesia (INA)	2	1	3	6
5	Singapore (SIN)*	2	0	6	8
6	Malaysia (MAS)	0	3	3	6
7	Myanmar (MYA)	0	1	1	2
8	Brunei (BRU)	0	1	0	1
8	Timor-Leste (TLS)	0	1	0	1
10	Laos (LAO)	0	0	4	4
11	Cambodia (CAM)	0	0	2	2
Totals (11 entries)		15	15	24	54
