= Pétanque at the 2015 SEA Games =

- Venue: Padang
- Dates: 6 June 2015 to 15 June 2015
- Competitors: 91 from 10 nations

Pétanque at the 2015 SEA Games was held in The Padang, Singapore from 6 to 15 June 2015.

== Participating nations ==
A total of 91 athletes from 10 nations will be competing in pétanque at the 2015 Southeast Asian Games:

- Brunei (4)
- Cambodia (16)
- Indonesia (2)
- Laos (12)
- Malaysia (13)
- Myanmar (12)
- Philippines (3)
- Singapore (9)
- Thailand (12)
- Vietnam (8)

== Competition schedule ==
The following is the competition schedule for the pétanque competitions:

P	Preliminaries	¼	Quarterfinals	½	Semifinals	F	Final

Event↓/Date →	Sat 6				Sun 7	Mon 8		Tue 9			Wed 10	Thu 11		Fri 12	Sat 13		Sun 14	Mon 15	
Men's singles					P	½	F												
Men's doubles											P	½	F						
Men's triples																	P	½	F
Men's shooting	P	¼	½	F															
Women's singles					P	½	F												
Women's doubles											P	½	F						
Women's triples																	P	½	F
Women's shooting	P	¼	½	F															
Mixed doubles						P		P	½	F									
Mixed triples														P	½	F			

== Medalists ==
=== Men ===
Event	Gold	Silver	Bronze
Singles	Muhd Hafizuddin Mat Daud; Malaysia	Thong Chhoeun; Cambodia	Ngo Ron; Vietnam
Singles	Muhd Hafizuddin Mat Daud; Malaysia	Thong Chhoeun; Cambodia	Phoudthala Keokannika; Laos
Doubles	Thailand (THA); Thaloengkoat Phusa-At; Sarawut Sriboonpeng	Malaysia (MAS); Mohamad Nurul Azwan Temizi; Saiful Bahri Musmin	Cambodia (CAM); Dy Sopanha; Yim Sophorn
Doubles	Thailand (THA); Thaloengkoat Phusa-At; Sarawut Sriboonpeng	Malaysia (MAS); Mohamad Nurul Azwan Temizi; Saiful Bahri Musmin	Vietnam (VIE); Ngo Ron; Tran Thach Lam
Triples	Thailand (THA); Suranath Phadungsap; Thaloengkiat Phusa-At; Suksan Piachan; Thanakorn Sangkaew	Malaysia (MAS); Mohammad Hakem Mahmad Saberi; Muhd Hafizuddin Mat Daud; Saiful Bahri Musmin; Syed Akmal Fikri Syed Ali	Cambodia (CAM); Heng Tha; Sieng Vanna; Tep Nora; Ya Chandararith
Triples	Thailand (THA); Suranath Phadungsap; Thaloengkiat Phusa-At; Suksan Piachan; Thanakorn Sangkaew	Malaysia (MAS); Mohammad Hakem Mahmad Saberi; Muhd Hafizuddin Mat Daud; Saiful Bahri Musmin; Syed Akmal Fikri Syed Ali	Laos (LAO); Phonexay Douangmisy; Phoudthala Keokannika; Siphandone Sisouphone; Phonepasert Soukkhaphon
Shooting	Thanakorn Sangkaew; Thailand	Sok Chanmean; Cambodia	Mohamad Nuzul Azwan Temizi; Malaysia
Shooting	Thanakorn Sangkaew; Thailand	Sok Chanmean; Cambodia	Bouadeng Vongvone; Laos

=== Women ===
Event	Gold	Silver	Bronze
Singles	Nantawan Fueangsanit; Thailand	Un Sreya; Cambodia	Khin Cherry Thet; Myanmar
Singles	Nantawan Fueangsanit; Thailand	Un Sreya; Cambodia	Bovilak Thepphakan; Laos
Doubles	Thailand (THA); Thongsri Thamakord; Phantipha Wongchuvej	Vietnam (VIE); Ngo Thi Huyen Tran; Nguyen Thi Thi	Cambodia (CAM); Ke Leng; Ouk Sreymom
Doubles	Thailand (THA); Thongsri Thamakord; Phantipha Wongchuvej	Vietnam (VIE); Ngo Thi Huyen Tran; Nguyen Thi Thi	Laos (LAO); Siphachanh Keovongsoth; Chindavone Sisavath
Triples	Thailand (THA); Nantawan Fueangsanit; Aumpawan Suwannaphruk; Thongsri Thamakord; Phantipha Wongchuvej	Malaysia (MAS); Nur Thahira Tasnim Abdul Aziz; Siti Zubaidah Abu Talib; Jasnina Jasmine Johan Johnson; Suhartisera Zamri	Laos (LAO); Siphachanh Keovongsoth; Chindavone Sisavath; Bovilak Thepphakan; Chansamone Vongsavath
Triples	Thailand (THA); Nantawan Fueangsanit; Aumpawan Suwannaphruk; Thongsri Thamakord; Phantipha Wongchuvej	Malaysia (MAS); Nur Thahira Tasnim Abdul Aziz; Siti Zubaidah Abu Talib; Jasnina Jasmine Johan Johnson; Suhartisera Zamri	Vietnam (VIE); Le Thi Thu Mai; Ngo Thi Huyen Tran; Nguyen Thi Thi; Tran Thi Diem Trang
Shooting	Nguyen Thi Thi; Vietnam	Annisa Alfath; Indonesia	Ke Leng; Cambodia
Shooting	Nguyen Thi Thi; Vietnam	Annisa Alfath; Indonesia	Khoun Souksavat; Laos

=== Mixed ===
Event	Gold	Silver	Bronze
Doubles	Thailand (THA); Sarawut Sriboonpeng; Nattaya Yoothong	Vietnam (VIE); Ngo Thi Huyen Tran; Tran Thach Lam	Laos (LAO); Xokananh Fongsanouvong; Chansamone Vongsavath
Doubles	Thailand (THA); Sarawut Sriboonpeng; Nattaya Yoothong	Vietnam (VIE); Ngo Thi Huyen Tran; Tran Thach Lam	Cambodia (CAM); Duch Sophorn; Thong Chhoeun
Triples	Thailand (THA); Suksan Piachan; Thanakorn Sangkaew; Aumpawan Suwannaphruk	Cambodia (CAM); Ouk Leakhena; Sok Chanmean; Tep Nora	Myanmar (MYA); Htwe Ko Ko; Pan Ei Phyo; Kyaw Yin
Triples	Thailand (THA); Suksan Piachan; Thanakorn Sangkaew; Aumpawan Suwannaphruk	Cambodia (CAM); Ouk Leakhena; Sok Chanmean; Tep Nora	Vietnam (VIE); Le Thi Thu Mai; Mai Huu Phuoc; Tran Thach Lam

== Medal table ==
Rank	Nation	Gold	Silver	Bronze	Total
1	Thailand (THA)	8	0	0	8
2	Malaysia (MAS)	1	3	1	5
3	Vietnam (VIE)	1	2	4	7
4	Cambodia (CAM)	0	4	5	9
5	Indonesia (INA)	0	1	0	1
6	Laos (LAO)	0	0	8	8
7	Myanmar (MYA)	0	0	2	2
Totals (7 entries)		10	10	20	40
