= Ricky Karanda Suwardi =

Indonesian badminton player (born 1992)

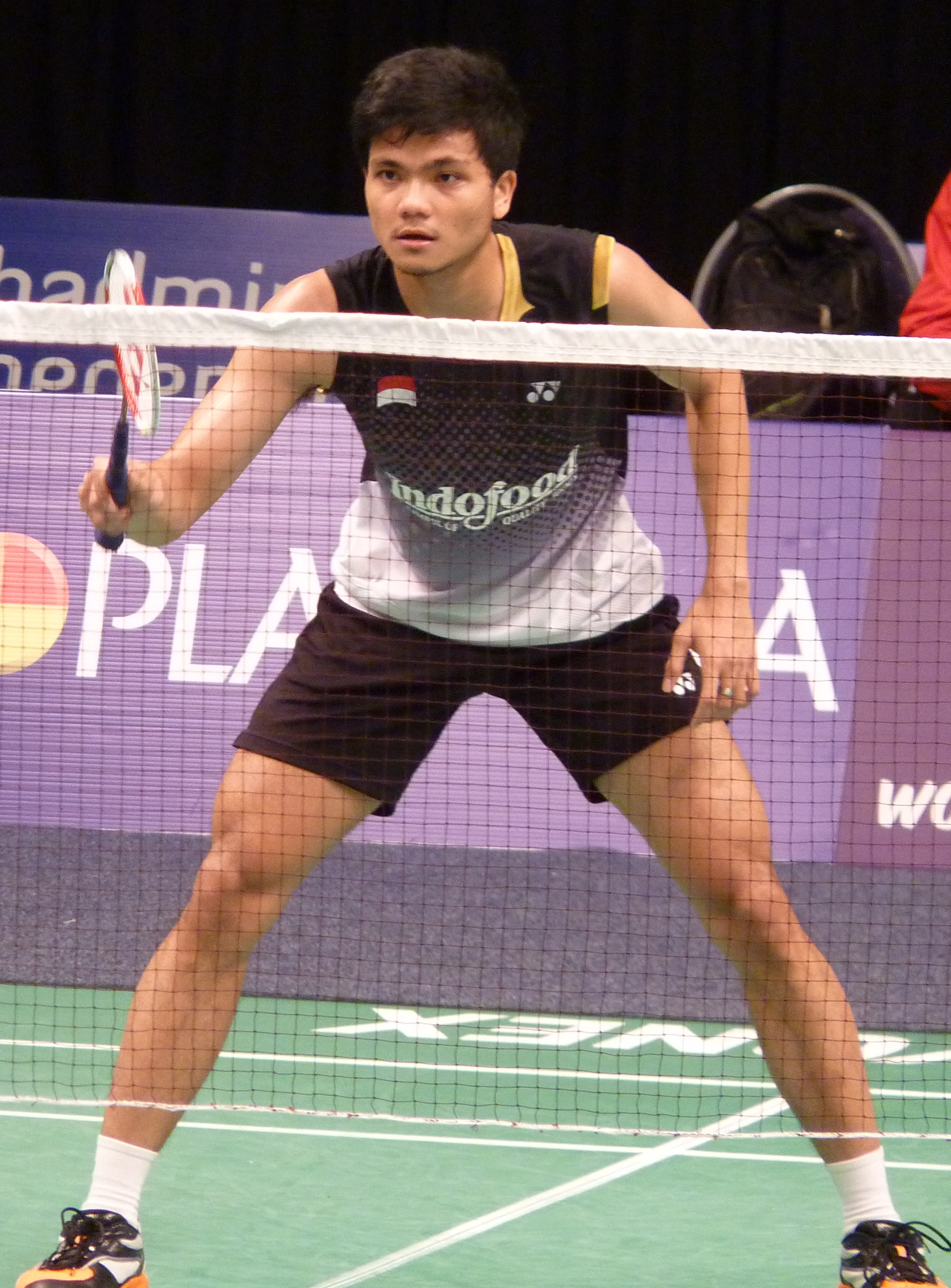

Personal information
- Born: 21 January 1992 (age 34) Cirebon, West Java, Indonesia
- Height: 1.80 m (5 ft 11 in)
- Weight: 72 kg (159 lb)

Sport
- Country: Indonesia
- Sport: Badminton
- Handedness: Right
- Coached by: Aryono Miranat; Herry Iman Pierngadi

Men's & mixed doubles
- Highest ranking: 7 (MD with Angga Pratama 22 December 2016); 17 (XD with Debby Susanto 22 November 2018)
- BWF profile
Medal record
Men's badminton
Representing Indonesia
Sudirman Cup
Bronze medal – third place	2015 Dongguan	Mixed team
Thomas Cup
Silver medal – second place	2016 Kunshan	Men's team
Bronze medal – third place	2014 New Delhi	Men's team
Asian Games
Silver medal – second place	2018 Jakarta–Palembang	Men's team
Asia Team Championships
Gold medal – first place	2016 Hyderabad	Men's team
SEA Games
Gold medal – first place	2015 Singapore	Men's doubles
Gold medal – first place	2015 Singapore	Men's team
Silver medal – second place	2013 Naypyidaw	Men's doubles
Asian Junior Championships
Bronze medal – third place	2010 Kuala Lumpur	Mixed doubles
Bronze medal – third place	2010 Kuala Lumpur	Mixed team

Ricky Karanda Suwardi (born 21 January 1992) is an Indonesian badminton player specializing in doubles. He is from Mutiara Cardinal Bandung club. Paired with Angga Pratama started end of 2014, the 2015 Singapore Open became the first BWF World Superseries title for him in the men's doubles after beating Chinese pair Fu Haifeng and Zhang Nan in the final by 21–15, 11–21, 21–14.

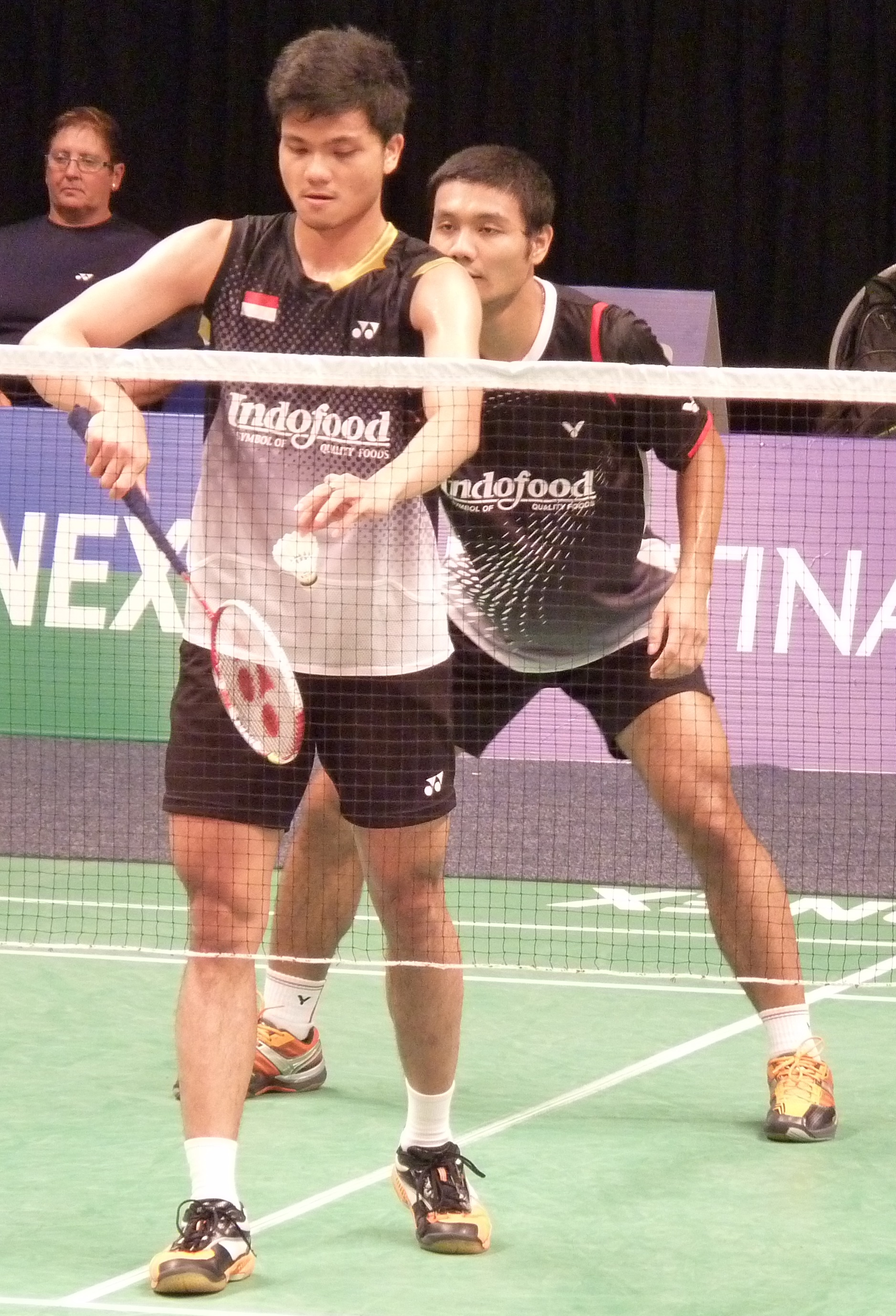
Suwardi and Berry Angriawan at 2013 Dutch Open Grand Prix

== Awards and nominations ==
Award	Year	Category	Result	Ref.
Golden Award SIWO PWI	2019	Favorite Team with 2018 Asian Games men's badminton team	Nominated	

== Achievements ==
=== SEA Games ===
Men's doubles
Year	Venue	Partner	Opponent	Score	Result	Ref.
2013	Wunna Theikdi Indoor Stadium; Naypyidaw, Myanmar	(Indonesia) Berry Angriawan	(Indonesia) Angga Pratama (Indonesia) Rian Agung Saputro	13–21, 21–17, 11–21	Silver	
2015	Singapore Indoor Stadium; Singapore	(Indonesia) Angga Pratama	(Indonesia) Marcus Fernaldi Gideon (Indonesia) Kevin Sanjaya Sukamuljo	21–12, 24–22	Gold	

=== Asian Junior Championships ===
Mixed doubles
Year	Venue	Partner	Opponent	Score	Result	Ref.
2010	Stadium Juara; Kuala Lumpur, Malaysia	(Indonesia) Della Destiara Haris	(Malaysia) Ow Yao Han (Malaysia) Lai Pei Jing	19–21, 19–21	Bronze	

=== BWF World Tour (1 runner-up) ===
The BWF World Tour, which was announced on 19 March 2017 and implemented in 2018, is a series of elite badminton tournaments sanctioned by the Badminton World Federation (BWF). The BWF World Tour is divided into levels of World Tour Finals, Super 1000, Super 750, Super 500, Super 300, and the BWF Tour Super 100.

Men's doubles
Year	Tournament	Level	Partner	Opponent	Score	Result	Ref.
2019	India Open	Super 500	(Indonesia) Angga Pratama	(Chinese Taipei) Lee Yang (Chinese Taipei) Wang Chi-lin	14–21, 14–21	(silver) Runner-up	

=== BWF Superseries (1 title, 3 runners-up) ===
The BWF Superseries, which was launched on 14 December 2006 and implemented in 2007, was a series of elite badminton tournaments, sanctioned by the Badminton World Federation (BWF). BWF Superseries levels were Superseries and Superseries Premier. A season of Superseries consisted of twelve tournaments around the world that had been introduced since 2011. Successful players were invited to the Superseries Finals, which were held at the end of each year.

Men's doubles
Year	Tournament	Partner	Opponent	Score	Result	Ref.
2015	Singapore Open	(Indonesia) Angga Pratama	(China) Fu Haifeng (China) Zhang Nan	21–15, 11–21, 21–14	(gold) Winner	
2016	India Open	(Indonesia) Angga Pratama	(Indonesia) Marcus Fernaldi Gideon (Indonesia) Kevin Sanjaya Sukamuljo	17–21, 13–21	(silver) Runner-up	
2016	Australian Open	(Indonesia) Angga Pratama	(Indonesia) Marcus Fernaldi Gideon (Indonesia) Kevin Sanjaya Sukamuljo	14–21, 15–21	(silver) Runner-up	
2017	India Open	(Indonesia) Angga Pratama	(Indonesia) Marcus Fernaldi Gideon (Indonesia) Kevin Sanjaya Sukamuljo	11–21, 15–21	(silver) Runner-up	

BWF Super Series Finals tournament
BWF Super Series Premier tournament
BWF Super Series tournament

=== BWF Grand Prix (4 runners-up) ===
The BWF Grand Prix had two levels, the Grand Prix and Grand Prix Gold. It was a series of badminton tournaments sanctioned by the Badminton World Federation (BWF) and played between 2007 and 2017.

Men's doubles
Year	Tournament	Partner	Opponent	Score	Result	Ref.
2013	London Grand Prix Gold	(Indonesia) Berry Angriawan	(Denmark) Mathias Boe (Denmark) Carsten Mogensen	13–21, 16–21	(silver) Runner-up	
2013	Dutch Open	(Indonesia) Berry Angriawan	(Indonesia) Wahyu Nayaka (Indonesia) Ade Yusuf	21–14, 18–21, 17–21	(silver) Runner-up	
2014	Macau Open	(Indonesia) Angga Pratama	(Singapore) Danny Bawa Chrisnanta (Singapore) Chayut Triyachart	19–21, 20–22	(silver) Runner-up	
2016	New Zealand Open	(Indonesia) Angga Pratama	(South Korea) Ko Sung-hyun (South Korea) Shin Baek-cheol	18–21, 14–21	(silver) Runner-up	

BWF Grand Prix Gold tournament
BWF Grand Prix tournament

=== BWF International Challenge/Series (2 titles, 2 runners-up) ===
Men's doubles
Year	Tournament	Partner	Opponent	Score	Result	Ref.
2010	Singapore International	(Indonesia) Agripina Prima Rahmanto Putra	(Indonesia) Albert Saputra (Indonesia) Rizki Yanu Kresnayandi	21–19, 12–21, 15–21	(silver) Runner-up	
2012	Vietnam International	(Indonesia) Muhammad Ulinnuha	(Indonesia) Marcus Fernaldi Gideon (Indonesia) Agripinna Prima Rahmanto Putra	21–12, 21–19	(gold) Winner	
2012	Indonesia International	(Indonesia) Muhammad Ulinnuha	(Indonesia) Yonathan Suryatama Dasuki (Indonesia) Hendra Aprida Gunawan	21–12, 12–21, 21–16	(gold) Winner	
2015	Thailand International	(Indonesia) Angga Pratama	(South Korea) Jun Bong-chan (South Korea) Kim Duck-young	14–21, 21–13, 14–21	(silver) Runner-up	

BWF International Challenge tournament
BWF International Series tournament

=== BWF Junior International (1 title) ===
Boys' doubles
Year	Tournament	Partner	Opponent	Score	Result	Ref.
2009	Indonesia Junior International	(Indonesia) Budi Hartono	(Indonesia) Dandi Prabudita (Indonesia) Jones Ralfy Jansen	21–15, 21–17	(gold) Winner	

BWF Junior International Grand Prix tournament
BWF Junior International Challenge tournament
BWF Junior International Series tournament
BWF Junior Future Series tournament

== Performance timeline ==
Key

W	Won	F	Finalist	SF	Semi-finalist
QF	Quarter-finalist	#R	Rounds 4, 3, 2, 1	RR	Round-robin stage
Q#	Qualification round	A	Absent	w/d	Withdrew
G	Gold	S	Silver	B	Bronze
NH	Not held	N/A	Not applicable	DNQ	Did not qualify

=== National team ===
- Junior level

Team event	2010
Asian Junior Championships	B

- Senior level

Team events	2014	2015	2016	2017	2018
SEA Games	NH	G	NH	A	NH
Asian Championships	NH		G	NH	A
Asia Mixed Team Championships	NH			QF	NH
Asian Games	A	NH			S
Thomas Cup	B	NH	S	NH	A
Sudirman Cup	NH	B	NH	A	NH

=== Individual competitions ===
==== Junior level ====
- Mixed doubles

Event	2010
Asian Junior Championships	B

==== Senior level ====
===== Men's doubles =====
Event	2013	2014	2015	2016	2017
SEA Games	S	NH	G	NH	A
Asian Championships	A			2R	2R
World Championships	DNQ	2R	QF	NH	3R

Tournament	BWF Superseries / Grand Prix								BWF World Tour					Best
Tournament	2010	2011	2012	2013	2014	2015	2016	2017	2018	2019	2020	2021	2022	Best
India Open	A			2R	1R	A	F	F	A	F	NH		A	F ('16, '17, '19)
Syed Modi International	SF	QF	QF	NH	A		2R	A			NH		A	SF ('10)
German Open	A			1R	A						NH		A	1R ('13)
All England Open	A			2R	1R	2R	2R	2R	A					2R ('13, '15, '16, '17)
Swiss Open	A				QF	2R	A				NH	A		QF ('14)
Korea Open	A				2R	2R	A				NH		A	2R ('14, '15)
Korea Masters	A	QF	A								NH		A	QF ('11)
Thailand Open	NH	2R	QF	A	NH	SF	A			1R	A	NH	A	SF ('15)
Indonesia Masters	QF	1R	2R	SF	QF	QF	SF	NH	A		Q1	A	Q2	SF ('13, '16)
Indonesia Open	A	Q2	2R	2R	2R	1R	1R	2R	2R	2R	NH	A		2R ('12, '13, '14, '17, '18, '19)
Malaysia Open	A				1R	QF	2R	1R	A	1R	NH		A	QF ('15)
Malaysia Masters	A		1R	A		SF	w/d	A				NH	A	SF ('15)
Singapore Open	A			1R	QF	W	QF	QF	A	1R	NH		A	W ('15)
Chinese Taipei Open	A	2R	QF	A	1R	QF	A				NH		A	QF ('12, '15)
Akita Masters	NA								A	2R	NH			2R ('19)
Japan Open	A					SF	A	w/d	1R	A	NH		A	SF ('15)
Vietnam Open	A		SF	A						2R	NH		A	SF ('12)
Indonesia Masters Super 100	NA								A	1R	NH		1R	1R ('19, '22)
Denmark Open	A					2R	SF	SF	A					SF ('16, '17)
French Open	A				2R	2R	SF	A			NH	A		SF ('16)
Bitburger Open	A				QF	A								QF ('14)
Macau Open	A		2R	A	F	A					NH			F ('14)
Hong Kong Open	A			2R	1R	QF	2R	2R	A	1R	NH			QF ('15)
Australian Open	A			QF	A		F	1R	A		NH			F ('16)
New Zealand Open	NH	NA	NH	2R	A		F	A			NH			F ('16)
China Open	A			1R	A	1R	1R	1R	QF	A	NH			QF ('18)
China Masters	A					1R	A				NH			1R ('15)
Dutch Open	A			F	A			2R	A		NH	NA		F ('13)
London Grand Prix	NA			F	NA									F ('13)
BWF Super Series Finals	DNQ						RR	DNQ						RR ('16)
Year-end ranking	87	63	29	51	27	10	7	12	92	47	44	58		7
Tournament	2010	2011	2012	2013	2014	2015	2016	2017	2018	2019	2020	2021	2022	Best

===== Mixed doubles =====
Event	2018
Asian Championships	QF
Asian Games	2R

Tournament	BWF World Tour					Best
Tournament	2018	2019	2020	2021	2022	Best
India Open	2R	2R	NH		A	2R ('18, '19)
Thailand Open	2R	A		NH	A	2R ('18)
Indonesia Masters	2R	A	1R	A		2R ('18)
Indonesia Open	QF	A	NH	A		QF ('18)
Malaysia Open	A	2R	NH		A	2R ('19)
Malaysia Masters	1R	A	2R	NH	A	2R ('20)
Singapore Open	A	QF	NH		A	QF ('19)
Japan Open	1R	A	NH		A	1R ('18)
Chinese Taipei Open	A	2R	NH		A	2R ('19)
Vietnam Open	A	QF	NH		A	QF ('19)
Indonesia Masters Super 100	A		NH		2R	2R ('22)
Denmark Open	2R	A				2R ('18)
French Open	1R	A	NH	A		1R ('18)
Australian Open	2R	A	NH			2R ('18)
New Zealand Open	2R	A	NH			2R ('18)
China Open	QF	A	NH			QF ('18)
Year-end ranking	18	72	54	68		17
Tournament	2018	2019	2020	2021	2022	Best

== Record against selected opponents ==
Men's doubles results against World Superseries finalists, World Superseries Finals semifinalists, World Championships semifinalists, and Olympic quarterfinalists paired with:

=== Angga Pratama ===
- (China) Cai Yun & Lu Kai 1–1
- (China) Chai Biao & Hong Wei 0–1
- (China) Fu Haifeng & Zhang Nan 1–1
- (China) Li Junhui & Liu Yuchen 1–2
- (China) Liu Xiaolong & Qiu Zihan 1–2
- (Chinese Taipei) Lee Sheng-mu & Tsai Chia-hsin 1–0
- (Denmark) Mads Pieler Kolding & Mads Conrad-Petersen 1–1
- (Denmark) Mathias Boe & Carsten Mogensen 0–5
- (Indonesia) Marcus Fernaldi Gideon & Kevin Sanjaya Sukamuljo 0–4
- (Japan) Hiroyuki Endo & Kenichi Hayakawa 2–2
- (Japan) Takeshi Kamura & Keigo Sonoda 5–1
- (South Korea) Kim Gi-jung & Kim Sa-rang 3–1
- (South Korea) Ko Sung-hyun & Shin Baek-cheol 1–1
- (South Korea) Lee Yong-dae & Yoo Yeon-seong 1–5
- (Malaysia) Goh V Shem & Tan Wee Kiong 2–0
- (Malaysia) Koo Kien Keat & Tan Boon Heong 0–1

=== Berry Angriawan ===
- (China) Cai Yun & Lu Kai 0–1
- (China) Liu Xiaolong & Qiu Zihan 0–1
- (Chinese Taipei) Lee Sheng-mu & Tsai Chia-hsin 0–2
- (Denmark) Mads Pieler Kolding & Mads Conrad-Petersen 1–0
- (Denmark) Mathias Boe & Carsten Mogensen 0–1
- (Indonesia) Angga Pratama & Rian Agung Saputro 1–0
- (Japan) Hirokatsu Hashimoto & Noriyasu Hirata 1–0
- (Japan) Hiroyuki Endo & Kenichi Hayakawa 2–1
- (South Korea) Ko Sung-hyun & Shin Baek-cheol 0–1
