= Indonesia at the 2015 SEA Games =

- IOC code: INA
- NOC: Indonesian Olympic Committee
- Website: www.nocindonesia.or.id

in Singapore 5 - 16 June 2015
- Flag bearer: I Gusti Made Oka Sulaksana (sailing)
- Officials: 525
- Medals Ranked 5th: Gold 47 Silver 61 Bronze 74 Total 182

SEA Games appearances (overview)
- 1977; 1979; 1981; 1983; 1985; 1987; 1989; 1991; 1993; 1995; 1997; 1999; 2001; 2003; 2005; 2007; 2009; 2011; 2013; 2015; 2017; 2019; 2021; 2023; 2025; 2027; 2029

Indonesia participated at the 2015 SEA Games from 5 to 16 June 2015.

Indonesian contingent collected a medal count of 47 gold, 61 silver and 74 bronze medals as the multi-sport events concluded on 16 June 2015.

== Competitors ==
Sport	Men	Women	Total
Diving	5	3	8
Swimming	12	10	22
Synchronised swimming	0	11	11
Water polo	13	13	26
Archery	6	7	13
Athletics	14	9	23
Badminton	10	10	20
Basketball	12	12	24
Billiards and snooker	8	2	10
Bowling	6	6	12
Boxing	6	4	10
Canoeing	12	7	19
Cycling	6	2	8
Equestrian	4	2	6
Fencing	12	12	24
Field hockey	0	18	18
Football	23	0	23
Golf	4	3	7
Gymnastics–Artistic	5	2	7
Gymnastics–Rhythmic	0	2	2
Judo	5	5	10
Pencak silat	10	6	16
Pétanque	1	1	2
Rowing	21	11	32
Sailing	2	1	3
Sepak takraw	12	7	19
Shooting	1	2	3
Softball	17	17	34
Squash	4	3	7
Table tennis	4	4	8
Taekwondo	6	4	10
Tennis	4	4	8
Traditional boat race	14	14	28
Volleyball	12	12	24
Waterskiing	7	4	11
Wushu	11	6	17
Others	1	3	4
Total	289	236	529

== Medal summary ==
=== Medal by sport ===
Medals by sport
Sport	1st place, gold medalist(s)	2nd place, silver medalist(s)	3rd place, bronze medalist(s)	Total
Rowing	8	6	4	18
Athletics	7	4	4	15
Waterskiing	4	7	2	13
Wushu	4	3	6	13
Judo	4	1	2	7
Canoeing	3	4	6	13
Pencak Silat	3	3	5	11
Badminton	3	2	4	9
Archery	2	3	1	6
Taekwondo	2	1	3	6
Equestrian	2	0	1	3
Traditional Boat Race	2	0	0	2
Swimming	1	8	7	16
Boxing	1	1	2	4
Cycling	1	0	0	1
Bowling	0	3	2	5
Tennis	0	2	4	6
Diving	0	2	1	3
Golf	0	2	1	3
Squash	0	2	1	3
Basketball	0	2	0	2
Fencing	0	1	5	6
Water Polo	0	1	1	2
Gymnastics Artistic	0	1	0	1
Pétanque	0	1	0	1
Softball	0	1	0	1
Sailing	0	0	3	3
Synchronised Swimming	0	0	3	3
Sepaktakraw	0	0	2	2
Volleyball	0	0	2	2
Billiards and Snooker	0	0	1	1
Table Tennis	0	0	1	1
Total	47	61	74	182

=== Medal by date ===
Medals by date
Day	Date	1st place, gold medalist(s)	2nd place, silver medalist(s)	3rd place, bronze medalist(s)	Total
–3	2 June	0	0	0	0
–2	3 June	0	0	1	1
–1	4 June	0	0	2	2
0	5 June	0	0	0	0
1	6 June	8	8	4	20
2	7 June	4	3	9	16
3	8 June	1	2	11	14
4	9 June	4	7	11	22
5	10 June	5	8	4	17
6	11 June	0	0	0	0
7	12 June	0	0	0	0
8	13 June	0	0	0	0
9	14 June	0	0	0	0
10	15 June	0	0	0	0
11	16 June	0	0	0	0
Total		47	61	74	182

=== Medalists ===
Medal	Name	Sport	Event	Date
Gold	Hendro	Athletics	Men's 20km Walk	6 June
Gold	Marjuki	Canoeing	Men's C1 1000m	6 June
Gold	Larasati Gading; Ferry Hadiyanto; Dewi Kunti Njoto; Alfaro Menayang	Equestrian	Dressage team	6 June
Gold	Mochammad Raharjo	Judo	Men's -66 kg	6 June
Gold	Gerard George	Judo	Men's -81 kg	6 June
Gold	Ni Kadek Anny Pandini	Judo	Women's -57 kg	6 June
Gold	Silo; Dedy Bwefer; Andri Mulyana; Agunawan; Syahrul Sahputra; Arpan; Rusman Sina; Achmad Fajrurrochman; Sofianto; Muhammad Faturohman; Jefklin Mehue; Muhammad Ramdhan; Syarifuddin; Azwir Aboni	Traditional Boat Race	Men's TBR 12-Crew 200m	6 June
Gold	Astri Dwijayanti; Wina Apriani; Ayuning Vihari; Septivina; Riana Yulistrian; Ririn Nurparidah; Cristina Kafolakari; Ririn Anggraini; Fazriah Nurbayan; Marnia; Shifa Nurkarim; Itsnah Tsaniah; Aswiati	Traditional Boat Race	Women's TBR 12-Crew 200m	6 June
Gold	Horas Manurung	Judo	Men's -90 kg	7 June
Gold	Achmad Hulaefi	Wushu	Men's Optional Cudget	7 June
Gold	Harris Horatius	Wushu	Men's Optional Nan Quan + Nan Gun	7 June
Gold	Lindswell Kwok	Wushu	Women's Optional Taijiquan	7 June
Gold	Lindswell Kwok	Wushu	Women's Optional Taijijian	8 June
Gold	Triyaningsih	Athletics	Women's 5000m	9 June
Gold	Spens Stuber Mehue	Canoeing	Men's C1 200m	9 June
Gold	Gandie; Mugi Harjito	Canoeing	Men's K2 200m	9 June
Gold	Larasati Gading	Equestrian	Dressage Individual	9 June
Gold	Agus Prayogo	Athletics	Men's 10000m	10 June
Gold	Maria Londa	Athletics	Women's Long Jump	10 June
Gold	Kornelis Kwangu Langu	Boxing	Men's light flyweight	10 June
Gold	Hendy; Yolla Jampil	Pencak Silat	Men's doubles	10 June
Gold	Ni Kadek Dewi; Ida Ayu Martiadi; Luh Putu Pratiwi	Pencak Silat	Women's team	10 June
Gold	Triyaningsih	Athletics	Women's 10000m	11 June
Gold	Maria Londa	Athletics	Women's triple jump	11 June
Gold	Robin Manullang	Cycling	Men's individual Time Trial	11 June
Gold	Deni Al Ghiffari; Muhad Yakin; Rendi Anugrah; Mochamad Lakiki	Rowing	Men's Lightweight Four - 500m	11 June
Gold	Memo	Rowing	Men's single sculls - 500m	11 June
Gold	Maryam Daimoi	Rowing	Women's Lightweight Single - 500m	11 June
Gold	Indra Gunawan	Swimming	Men's 50m breaststroke	11 June
Gold	Rini Budiarti	Athletics	Women's 3000m Steeplechase	12 June
Gold	Angga Pratama; Anthony Sinisuka Ginting; Firman Abdul Kholik; Jonatan Christie; Ihsan M. Mustofa; Kevin Sanjaya Sukamuljo; Marcus Fernaldi Gideon; Praveen Jordan; Ricky Karanda Suwardi; Riky Widianto	Badminton	Men's team	12 June
Gold	Reinaldy Atmanegara	Taekwondo	Men's -54kg	12 June
Gold	Febrianto	Waterskiing	Men's tricks	12 June
Gold	Ika Yuliana Rochmawati; Riau Ega Agatha	Archery	Mixed team recurve	13 June
Gold	Titik Kusumawardani	Archery	Women's individual recurve	13 June
Gold	Mariska Halinda	Taekwondo	Women's -53kg	13 June
Gold	Ade Hermana	Waterskiing	Men's jump	13 June
Gold	Rossi Amir	Waterskiing	Women's jump	13 June
Gold	Tri Juanda Bahar	Pencak Silat	Men's tanding class H	14 June
Gold	M.Rais Mahu; Agus Budy Aji; Wiko; Adi Adriansyah; Arfin; Edwin Rudiana; Jarudin; Mahendra Yanto; Ferdiansyah	Rowing	Men's Eights - 1000m	14 June
Gold	Arief; Ihram	Rowing	Men's Lightweight Double - 1000m	14 June
Gold	Deni Al Ghiffari; Muhad Yakin; Rendi Anugrah; Mochamad Lakiki	Rowing	Men's Lightweight Four - 1000m	14 June
Gold	Budi Santoso; Tanzil Hadid	Rowing	Men's pair - 1000m	14 June
Gold	Memo	Rowing	Men's single sculls - 1000m	14 June
Gold	Febrianto	Waterskiing	Men's overall	14 June
Gold	Ricky Karanda Suwardi; Angga Pratama	Badminton	Men's doubles	16 June
Gold	Praveen Jordan; Debby Susanto	Badminton	Mixed doubles	16 June
Silver	Anwar Tarra; Muhammad Yunus	Canoeing	Men's C2 1000m	6 June
Silver	Maizir Riyondra; Sutrisno; Asep Hidayat; Dedi Suyatno	Canoeing	Men's K4 1000m	6 June
Silver	Adityo Putra; Andriyan	Diving	Men's 10m synchronised platform	6 June
Silver	Ade Ansyori; Ricky Dhisulumah; Ruli Maulidadhani; Idon Wiguna	Fencing	Men's team sabre	6 June
Silver	Iksan Apriyadi	Judo	Men's -73 kg	6 June
Silver	Annisa Alfath	Pétanque	Women's Shooting	6 June
Silver	I Gede Siman Sudartawa	Swimming	Men's 100m backstroke	6 June
Silver	Aldy Lukman	Wushu	Men's Optional Changquan	6 June
Silver	Akhmad Syukran Jamjami	Diving	Men's 3m springboard	7 June
Silver	Yessy Yosaputra	Swimming	Women's 200m backstroke	7 June
Silver	Juwita Niza Wasni	Wushu	Women's Optional Nan Quan + Nan Dao	7 June
Silver	Erni Sokoy	Canoeing	Women's K1-500m	8 June
Silver	Achmad Hulaefi	Wushu	Men's Optional Broadsword	8 June
Silver	Yaspi Boby	Athletics	Men's 100m	9 June
Silver	Agus Prayogo	Athletics	Men's 5000m	9 June
Silver	Rini Budiarti	Athletics	Women's 5000m	9 June
Silver	Erni Sokoy	Canoeing	Women's K1-200m	9 June
Silver	Glenn Victor Sutanto	Swimming	Men's 100m butterfly	9 June
Silver	Anak Agung Ratih	Swimming	Women's 100m backstroke	9 June
Silver	Christopher Rungkat; Aditya Sasongko; David Susanto; Sunu Wahyu Trijati	Tennis	Men's team	9 June
Silver	Ryan Leonard Lalisang; Billy Islam	Bowling	Men's doubles	10 June
Silver	Sharon Santoso; Tannya Roumimper	Bowling	Women's doubles	10 June
Silver	Christina Jembay	Boxing	Women's Featherweight	10 June
Silver	Rifda Irfanaluthfi	Gymnastics Artistic	Women's floor	10 June
Silver	Sugianto	Pencak Silat	Men's singles	10 June
Silver	Men's team	Softball	Men	10 June
Silver	Glenn Victor Sutanto	Swimming	Men's 50m butterfly	10 June
Silver	Aflah Prawira	Swimming	Men's 1500m freestyle	10 June
Silver	Dedeh Erawati	Athletics	Men's 100m hurdles	11 June
Silver	Ardi Isadi	Rowing	Men's Lightweight Single - 500m	11 June
Silver	Budi Santoso; Tanzil Hadid	Rowing	Men's pair - 500m	11 June
Silver	Syiva Lisdiana; Fitri R. Wa Ode	Rowing	Women's pair - 500m	11 June
Silver	I Gede Siman Sudartawa	Swimming	Men's 50m backstroke	11 June
Silver	I Gede Siman Sudartawa; Indra Gunawan; Glenn Victor Sutanto; Triady Fauzi Sidiq	Swimming	Men's 4 × 100 m medley relay	11 June
Silver	Ryan Lalisang; Billy Islam; Yeri Ramadona; Hardy Rachmadian; Adhiguna Widiantoro; Diwan Syahril	Bowling	Men's team of Five	12 June
Silver	Rivani Sihotang	Golf	Women's individual	12 June
Silver	Ida Ayu Putri; Rivani Sihotang; Tatiana Wijaya	Golf	Women's team	12 June
Silver	Maulana Haidir	Taekwondo	Men's individual poomsae	12 June
Silver	Dimas Suprihono	Waterskiing	Men's tricks	12 June
Silver	Nur Alimah Prambodo	Waterskiing	Women's tricks	12 June
Silver	Galuh Maulidina	Waterskiing	Women's Wakeboard	12 June
Silver	Hendra Purnama; Riau Ega Salsabila; Muhammad Hanif Wijaya	Archery	Men's team recurve	13 June
Silver	Titik Kusumawardani; Ika Yuliana Rochmawati; Diananda Choirunisa	Archery	Women's team recurve	13 June
Silver	Yeni Rohmah; Catur Yuliana; Irma Maryani	Squash	Women's team	13 June
Silver	Febrianto	Waterskiing	Men's jump	13 June
Silver	Indra Hardnata	Waterskiing	Men's slalom	13 June
Silver	Ummu Sholikah	Waterskiing	Women's slalom	13 June
Silver	I Gusti Nyoman Puruhito; Sapriatno; Yoke Rizaldi Akbar	Archery	Men's team compound	14 June
Silver	Awaluddin Nur	Pencak Silat	Men's tanding class A	14 June
Silver	Wewey Wita	Pencak Silat	Women's tanding class C	14 June
Silver	Yayah Rokayah; Wahyuni; Yuniarty; Chelsea Corputty	Rowing	Women's Lightweight Four - 1000m	14 June
Silver	Maryam Daimoi	Rowing	Women's Lightweight Single - 1000m	14 June
Silver	Syiva Lisdiana; Fitri R. Wa Ode	Rowing	Women's pair - 1000m	14 June
Silver	David Susanto	Tennis	Men's singles	14 June
Silver	Nur Alimah Prambodo	Waterskiing	Women's overall	14 June
Silver	Men's team	Basketball	Men's team	15 June
Silver	Women's team	Basketball	Women's team	15 June
Silver	Ade Furkon; Sandi Perdana	Squash	Men's Jumbo Doubles	15 June
Silver	Hanna Ramadhini	Badminton	Women's singles	16 June
Silver	Marcus Fernaldi Gideon; Kevin Sanjaya Sukamuljo	Badminton	Men's doubles	16 June
Silver	Zuliansyah; Beby Tarigan; Delvin Feliciano; Muhammad Rizki; Andi Uwayzulqarni; Benny Respati; Yusuf Budiman; Rezza Putra; Brandley Legawa; Ridjkie Mulia; Muhamad Firdaus; Zaenal Arifin; Novian Dwi Putra	Water Polo	Men's team	16 June
Bronze	Adela Nirmala; Amara Gebby; Andriani Ardhana; Anisa Feritrianti; Claudia Suyanto; Rosa Palmastuti; Livia Lukito; Putri Yanin Sari; Sabihisma Arsyi; Sherly Haryono; Tri Eka Sandiri	Synchronised Swimming	Team Technical and Free Routine	3 June
Bronze	Anisa Feritrianti; Claudia Suyanto; (s) Adela Nirmala	Synchronised Swimming	Duet Technical and Free Routine	4 June
Bronze	Adela Nirmala; Amara Gebby; Andriani Ardhana; Anisa Feritrianti; Claudia Suyanto; Rosa Palmastuti; Livia Lukito; Putri Yanin Sari; Sabihisma Arsyi; Sherly Haryono; Tri Eka Sandiri	Synchronised Swimming	Team Free Combination	4 June
Bronze	Andri Sugiarto; Chandra Nugraha	Canoeing	Men's K2 1000m	6 June
Bronze	Joneska Anggera; Muhammad Haerullah; Ryan Pratama; Yudi Setiawan	Fencing	Men's team Épée	6 June
Bronze	Flodesa; Chintya Pua; Herlin Purnamawati; Verdiana Rihandini	Fencing	Women's team Foil	6 June
Bronze	Patricia Hapsari; Kathriana Gustianji; Sagita Krisdewanti; Ressa Kania Dewi	Swimming	Women's 4 × 100 m freestyle relay	6 June
Bronze	Ricky Gunarto; Tauhid Ramadhan; Aryanto Agus Salim; Dennis Satriana	Fencing	Men's team Foil	7 June
Bronze	Isnawaty Idar; Megawati; Jean Nurhidayati; Dian Pertiwi	Fencing	Women's team Épée	7 June
Bronze	Reni Anggraini; Diah Permatasari; Ima Sapitri; Novi Susanti	Fencing	Women's team sabre	7 June
Bronze	Szalsza Maulida	Judo	Women's -70 kg	7 June
Bronze	Tiara Arta Garthia	Judo	Women's -78 kg	7 June
Bronze	Triady Fauzi Sidiq; Satria Bagaskara Putra; Alfah Prawira; Ricky Anggawidjaja	Swimming	Men's 4 × 200 m freestyle relay	7 June
Bronze	Julius Kurniawan	Wushu	Men's optional taijijian	7 June
Bronze	Hendrik Tarigan	Wushu	Men's Sanda -60 kg	7 June
Bronze	Ivana Irmanto	Wushu	Men's Optional Nan Quan + Nan Dao	7 June
Bronze	Farrand Papendang	Boxing	Men's Lightweight	8 June
Bronze	Ester Kalayukin	Boxing	Women's Bantam Weight	8 June
Bronze	Erni Sokoy; Masripah	Canoeing	Women's K2-500m	8 June
Bronze	Triady Fauzi Sidiq	Swimming	Men's 50m freestyle	8 June
Bronze	Ricky Anggawidjaja	Swimming	Men's 200m backstroke	8 June
Bronze	Sagita Krisdewanti; Ressa Kania Dewi; Kathriana Gustianji; Patricia Hapsari	Swimming	Women's 4 × 200 m freestyle relay	8 June
Bronze	Akhmad Haruri; Gilang Maulana; Gilang Ramadhan; Ficky Santoso	Table Tennis	Men's team	8 June
Bronze	Ayu Fani Damayanti; Jessy Rompies; Lavinia Tananta; Aldila Sutjiadi	Tennis	Women's team	8 June
Bronze	Julius Kurniawan	Wushu	Men's compulsory taijiquan	8 June
Bronze	Harris Horatius; Aldy Lukman	Wushu	Men's Duel Event	8 June
Bronze	Fredy	Wushu	Men's Optional Taijiquan	8 June
Bronze	Iswandi	Athletics	Men's 100m	9 June
Bronze	Adityo Putra; Akhmad Sukran Jamjami	Diving	Men's 3m synchronised springboard	9 June
Bronze	Gandie	Canoeing	Men's K1 200m	9 June
Bronze	Asep Hidayat; Maizir Riyondra; Andri Sugiarto; Sutrisno	Canoeing	Men's K4 200m	9 June
Bronze	Riska Andriyani	Canoeing	Women's C1 200m	9 June
Bronze	Yunita Kadop; Masripah; Riska Ramadani; Erni Sokoy	Canoeing	Women's K4 200m	9 June
Bronze	Alfaro Menayang	Equestrian	Dressage Individual	9 June
Bronze	Achmad Zainudin	Sailing	Men's Youth Laser Radial	9 June
Bronze	Saiful Rizal; Herson Muhammad; Dedi Setyawan; Hendra Pago; Darmawan; Victoria Prasetyo; Muhammad Wajib; Nofrisal; Andi Try Sandi; Risky Pago; Syamsul Akmal; Syafiudin	Sepaktakraw	Men's team	9 June
Bronze	Triady Fauzi Sidiq	Swimming	Men's 100m butterfly	9 June
Bronze	Triady Fauzi Sidiq; Glenn Victor Sutanto; Alexis Wijaya Ohmar; Ricky Anggawidjaja	Swimming	Men's 4 × 100 m freestyle relay	9 June
Bronze	Andrian	Athletics	Men's 400m hurdles	10 June
Bronze	Jaka Kurniawan; Sahroni; Marlando Sihombing	Billiards and snooker	Men's English Billiard Team	10 June
Bronze	I Gusti Made Oka Sulaksana	Sailing	Men's windsurfing RSX	10 June
Bronze	Hoiriyah	Sailing	Women's Windsuring RSX	10 June
Bronze	Anggia S. Awanda; Debby Susanto; Dinar Dyah Ayustine; Gregoria Mariska; Hanna Ramadini; Lindaweni Fanetri; Maretha D. Giovani; Ni Ketut Mahadewi; Richi P. Dili; Suci R. Andini	Badminton	Women's team	11 June
Bronze	Ryan Lalisang; Billy Islam; Hardy Rachmadian	Bowling	Men's trios	11 June
Bronze	Arief; Ihram	Rowing	Men's Lightweight Doubles - 500m	11 June
Bronze	Yuniarty; Wahyuni	Rowing	Women's Lightweight Doubles - 500m	11 June
Bronze	Saiful Rizal; Herson Muhammad; Dedi Setyawan; Hendra Pago; Darmawan; Victoria Prasetyo; Muhammad Wajib; Nofrisal; Andi Try Sandi; Risky Pago; Syamsul Akmal; Syafiudin	Sepaktakraw	Men's team Doubles	11 June
Bronze	Atjong Purwanto	Athletics	Men's 3000m Steeplechase	12 June
Bronze	Fadlin; Iswandi; Yudi Dwi Nugroho; Yaspi Bobi	Athletics	Men's 4 × 100 m Relay	12 June
Bronze	Kevin C. Akbar; Rizchy S. Putra; Fadhli R. Soetarso; Tirto Tamardi	Golf	Men's team	12 June
Bronze	Ade Furkon; Sandi Perdana; Eris Setiawan; Syauma Siswa	Squash	Men's team	12 June
Bronze	Muhamad Fitricahyanto; Maulana Haidir; Muhammad Wahyu	Taekwondo	Men's team poomsae	12 June
Bronze	Mutiara Habiba	Taekwondo	Women's individual poomsae	12 June
Bronze	Lavinia Tananta	Tennis	Women's singles	12 June
Bronze	Anggia Shitta Awanda; Ni Ketut Mahadewi Istarani	Badminton	Women's doubles	15 June
Bronze	Maretha Dea Giovani; Suci Rizky Andini	Badminton	Women's doubles	15 June
Bronze	Riky Widianto; Richi Puspita Dili	Badminton	Mixed doubles	15 June

=== Multiple Gold Medalists ===
Name	Sport	Gold	Silver	Bronze	Total
Lindswell Kwok	Wushu	2	0	0	2
