= Timor-Leste at the 2015 SEA Games =

Timor-Leste at the 2015 Southeast Asian Games
- IOC code: TLS
- NOC: National Olympic Committee of Timor Leste

in Singapore
- Competitors: 66 in 7 sports
- Flag bearer: Elio Jenoveva Edito
- Medals Ranked 11th: Gold 0 Silver 1 Bronze 1 Total 2

Southeast Asian Games appearances (overview)
- 2003; 2005; 2007; 2009; 2011; 2013; 2015; 2017; 2019; 2021; 2023; 2025; 2027; 2029

Timor-Leste competed in the 2015 Southeast Asian Games from 5 to 16 June 2015.

== Competitors ==
Sport	Men	Women	Total
Athletics	2	3	5
Basketball	12	0	12
Boxing	6	0	6
Cycling	4	0	4
Football	27	0	27
Pencak silat	5	3	8
Taekwondo	3	1	4
Total	59	7	66

== Medal summary ==
=== Medal by sport ===
Medals by sport
Sport	1st place, gold medalist(s)	2nd place, silver medalist(s)	3rd place, bronze medalist(s)	Total
Boxing	0	0	1	1
Taekwondo	0	1	0	1
Total	0	0	1	2

=== Medal by date ===
Medals by date
Day	Date	1st place, gold medalist(s)	2nd place, silver medalist(s)	3rd place, bronze medalist(s)	Total
–3	2 June	0	0	0	0
–2	3 June	0	0	0	0
–1	4 June	0	0	0	0
0	5 June	0	0	0	0
1	6 June	0	0	0	0
2	7 June	0	0	0	0
3	8 June	0	0	1	1
4	9 June	0	0	0	0
5	10 June	0	0	0	0
6	11 June	0	0	0	0
7	12 June	0	0	0	0
8	13 June	0	1	0	1
9	14 June	0	0	0	0
10	15 June	0	0	0	0
11	16 June	0	0	0	0
Total		0	1	1	2

=== Medalists ===
Medal	Name	Sport	Event	Date
Silver	Rosa Luisa Dos Santos	Taekwondo	Women's 46 kg	13 June
Bronze	Henrique Martins Borges Pereira	Boxing	Welterweight (69 kg)	8 June
