= Wushu at the 2015 SEA Games =

- Venue: Expo Hall 2
- Dates: 6–8 June 2015
- Competitors: 113 from 10 nations

Wushu at the 2015 SEA Games was held at the Singapore Expo Hall 2 in Tampines, Singapore from 6 to 8 June 2015.

== Participating nations ==
A total of 113 athletes from 10 nations competed in wushu at the 2015 Southeast Asian Games:

- Brunei (5)
- Cambodia (5)
- Indonesia (17)
- Laos (8)
- Malaysia (17)
- Myanmar (13)
- Philippines (12)
- Singapore (17)
- Thailand (5)
- Vietnam (14)

== Medal table ==
* Host nation (Singapore)

Rank	Nation	Gold	Silver	Bronze	Total
1	Singapore (SIN)*	6	3	3	12
2	Vietnam (VIE)	4	4	3	11
3	Indonesia (INA)	4	3	6	13
4	Myanmar (MYA)	3	3	1	7
5	Malaysia (MAS)	2	3	4	9
6	Philippines (PHI)	1	4	1	6
7	Brunei (BRU)	0	0	2	2
7	Laos (LAO)	0	0	2	2
Totals (8 entries)		20	20	22	62

== Medalists ==
=== Men's taolu ===
Event	Gold	Silver	Bronze
Changquan	Yong Yi Xiang; Singapore	Aldy Lukman; Indonesia	Trần Xuân Hiệp; Vietnam
Daoshu	Trần Xuân Hiệp; Vietnam	Achmad Hulaefi; Indonesia	Nguyễn Mạnh Quyền; Vietnam
Gunshu	Achmad Hulaefi; Indonesia	Trần Xuân Hiệp; Vietnam	Yong Yi Xiang; Singapore
Nanquan / Nangun	Harris Horatius; Indonesia	Phạm Quốc Khánh; Vietnam	Aung Wai Phyo; Myanmar
Taijiquan	Lee Tze Yuan; Singapore	Daniel Parantac; Philippines	Fredy Fredy; Indonesia
Compulsory Taijiquan	Loh Jack Chang; Malaysia	Tan Wei Han Samuel; Singapore	Julius Yoga Kurniawan; Indonesia
Taijijian	Daniel Parantac; Philippines	Loh Jack Chang; Malaysia	Julius Yoga Kurniawan; Indonesia
Barehand Duilian	Singapore (SIN); Fung Jin Jie; Tan Xiang Tian; Tay Wei Sheng	Philippines (PHI); Spencer Bahod; Alieson Ken Omengan; Thornton Quieney Lou Sayan	Indonesia (INA); Harris Horatius; Aldy Lukman
Weapons Duilian	Singapore (SIN); Jesse Colin Adalia; Lee Zhe Xuan; Lim Si Wei	Philippines (PHI); Norlence Ardee Catolico; John Keithley Chan; Daniel Parantac	Brunei (BRU); Sufi Shayiran Roslan Md; Mohammad Adi Sya'Rani Roslan

=== Men's sanda ===
Event	Gold	Silver	Bronze
60 kg	Hoàng Văn Cao; Vietnam	Francisco Solis; Philippines	Khamla Soukaphone; Laos
60 kg	Hoàng Văn Cao; Vietnam	Francisco Solis; Philippines	Hendrik Tarigan; Indonesia
65 kg	Nguyễn Văn Tài; Vietnam	Tun Kyaw Lin; Myanmar	Clemente Jr. Tabugara; Philippines
65 kg	Nguyễn Văn Tài; Vietnam	Tun Kyaw Lin; Myanmar	Lin Yiqiang; Singapore

=== Women's taolu ===
Event	Gold	Silver	Bronze
Changquan	Mui Wei Ting Zoe; Singapore	Oo Sandy; Myanmar	Dương Thúy Vi; Vietnam
Jianshu	Dương Thúy Vi; Vietnam	Phoon Eyin; Malaysia	Aggie Cheah Ruey Shin; Malaysia
Qiangshu	Oo Sandy; Myanmar	Dương Thúy Vi; Vietnam	Phoon Eyin; Malaysia
Nanquan / Nandao	Myint Aye Thit Sar; Myanmar	Juwita Niza Wasni; Indonesia	Ivana Ardelia Irmanto; Indonesia
Taijiquan	Lindswell; Indonesia	Trần Thị Minh Huyền; Vietnam	Chan Lu Yi; Malaysia
Compulsory Taijiquan	Tan Yan Ning Vera; Singapore	Chan Lu Yi; Malaysia	Ho Lin Ying; Singapore
Taijijian	Lindswell; Indonesia	Wee Ling En Valerie; Singapore	Ng Shin Yii; Malaysia
Barehand Duilian	Malaysia (MAS); Chan Audrey Yee Jo; Chan Lu Yi; Cheah Aggie Ruey Shin	Myanmar (MYA); Mi Aint Mi; Sandy Oo	Laos (LAO); Payai Her; Chuevue Naotuevue
Weapons Duilian	Myanmar (MYA); Myint Aye Thit Sar; Phyo Myat Thet Su Wai	Singapore (SIN); Mui Zoe Wei Ting Zoe; Sin Min Li	Brunei (BRU); Faustina Woo Wai Sii; Lee Ying Shi
