= Boxing at the 2015 SEA Games =

Boxing competitions

- Venue: Expo Hall 1
- Dates: 6–10 June 2015
- Competitors: 85 from 10 nations

Boxing at the 2015 SEA Games will be held in Singapore Expo Hall 1 from 6 to 10 June 2015.

== Participating nations ==
A total of 85 athletes from 10 nations will be competing in boxing at the 2015 Southeast Asian Games:

- Cambodia (6)
- Indonesia (10)
- Laos (6)
- Malaysia (7)
- Myanmar (10)
- Philippines (10)
- Singapore (10)
- Thailand (10)
- Timor-Leste (6)
- Vietnam (10)

== Competition schedule ==
The following is the competition schedule for the boxing competitions:

P	Preliminaries	½	Semifinals	F	Final

Event↓/Date →	Sat 6	Sun 7	Mon 8	Tue 9	Wed 10
Men's 46 kg	P	P	½		F
Men's 49 kg	P	P	½		F
Men's 52 kg	P	P	½		F
Men's 56 kg	P	P	½		F
Men's 60 kg	P	P	½		F
Men's 64 kg	P	P	½		F
Men's 69 kg	P	P	½		F
Women's 45 kg	P		½		F
Women's 48 kg	P		½		F
Women's 51 kg	P		½		F
Women's 54 kg	P		½		F

== Medalists ==
=== Men ===
Event	Gold	Silver	Bronze
Light Flyweight (46–49 kg)	Kornelis Kwangu Langu; Indonesia	Rogen Ladon; Philippines	Ngoc Tan Huynh; Vietnam
Light Flyweight (46–49 kg)	Kornelis Kwangu Langu; Indonesia	Rogen Ladon; Philippines	Bounpone Lasavanesy; Laos
Flyweight (52 kg)	Ian Clark Bautista; Philippines	Mohamed Hanurdeen Hamid; Singapore	Thongbang Seuaphom; Laos
Flyweight (52 kg)	Ian Clark Bautista; Philippines	Mohamed Hanurdeen Hamid; Singapore	Maung Nge; Myanmar
Bantamweight (56 kg)	Mario Fernandez; Philippines	Tanes Ongjunta; Thailand	Muhamad Ridhwan Ahmad; Singapore
Bantamweight (56 kg)	Mario Fernandez; Philippines	Tanes Ongjunta; Thailand	Naing Latt; Myanmar
Lightweight (60 kg)	Junel Cantancio; Philippines	Van Hai Nguyen; Vietnam	Farrand Papendang; Indonesia
Lightweight (60 kg)	Junel Cantancio; Philippines	Van Hai Nguyen; Vietnam	Saylom Ardee; Thailand
Light Welterweight (64 kg)	Wuttichai Masuk; Thailand	Ratha Ven; Cambodia	Jun Hao Leong; Singapore
Light Welterweight (64 kg)	Wuttichai Masuk; Thailand	Ratha Ven; Cambodia	Oudone Khanxay; Laos
Welterweight (69 kg)	Eumir Felix Marcial; Philippines	Jia Wei Tay; Singapore	Apichet Saensit; Thailand
Welterweight (69 kg)	Eumir Felix Marcial; Philippines	Jia Wei Tay; Singapore	Henrique Martins Borges Pereira; Timor-Leste
Middleweight (75 kg)	Dinh Hoang Truong; Vietnam	Aphisit Khankhokkhruea; Thailand	Aung Ko Ko; Myanmar
Middleweight (75 kg)	Dinh Hoang Truong; Vietnam	Aphisit Khankhokkhruea; Thailand	Wilfredo Lopez; Philippines

=== Women ===
Event	Gold	Silver	Bronze
Light flyweight (48 kg)	Josie Gabuco; Philippines	Chuthamat Raksat; Thailand	Leona Hui; Singapore
Light flyweight (48 kg)	Josie Gabuco; Philippines	Chuthamat Raksat; Thailand	Lê Thị Ngọc Anh; Vietnam
Flyweight (51 kg)	Nguyễn Thị Yến; Vietnam	Irish Magno; Philippines	Fen Ni Ang; Singapore
Flyweight (51 kg)	Nguyễn Thị Yến; Vietnam	Irish Magno; Philippines	Sopida Satumrum; Thailand
Bantamweight (54 kg)	Lê Thị Bằng; Vietnam	Nesthy Petecio; Philippines	Nwe Ni Oo; Myanmar
Bantamweight (54 kg)	Lê Thị Bằng; Vietnam	Nesthy Petecio; Philippines	Ester Kalayukin; Indonesia
Featherweight (57 kg)	Tassamalee Thongjan; Thailand	Christina Marwan Jembay; Indonesia	Ve Ro Ni Ka; Myanmar
Featherweight (57 kg)	Tassamalee Thongjan; Thailand	Christina Marwan Jembay; Indonesia	Riza Pasuit; Philippines

== Medal table ==
* Host nation (Singapore)

Rank	Nation	Gold	Silver	Bronze	Total
1	Philippines	5	3	2	10
2	Vietnam	3	1	2	6
3	Thailand	2	3	3	8
4	Indonesia	1	1	2	4
5	Singapore*	0	2	4	6
6	Cambodia	0	1	0	1
7	Myanmar	0	0	5	5
8	Laos	0	0	3	3
9	Timor-Leste	0	0	1	1
Totals (9 entries)		11	11	22	44
