= Myanmar at the 2015 SEA Games =

Myanmar at the 2015 Southeast Asian Games
- IOC code: MYA
- NOC: Myanmar Olympic Committee

in Singapore
- Competitors: 382 in 31 sports
- Flag bearer: Ye Sithu
- Officials: 405
- Medals Ranked 7th: Gold 12 Silver 25 Bronze 31 Total 68

Southeast Asian Games appearances (overview)
- 1959; 1961; 1965; 1967; 1969; 1971; 1973; 1975; 1977; 1979; 1981; 1983; 1985; 1987; 1989; 1991; 1993; 1995; 1997; 1999; 2001; 2003; 2005; 2007; 2009; 2011; 2013; 2015; 2017; 2019; 2021; 2023; 2025; 2027; 2029

Myanmar participated in the 2015 Southeast Asian Games from 5th to 16th June 2015. The highlight of the event was Myanmar performing as dark horses in the U-23 football tournament. The team stayed undefeated with three wins and one draw. They topped Group A and remained undefeated till the finals. They lost to the defending champions, Thailand, in the finals.

== Competitors ==
Sport	Men	Women	Total
Diving	2	2	4
Swimming	1	2	3
Archery	8	8	16
Athletics	10	11	21
Badminton	2	2	4
Basketball	10	0	10
Billiards and snooker	10	2	12
Bowling	6	0	6
Boxing	6	4	10
Canoeing	12	7	19
Cycling	2	1	3
Equestrian	4	0	4
Fencing	7	7	14
Field hockey	18	0	18
Football	30	0	30
Golf	4	3	7
Gymnastics–Artistic	5	0	5
Judo	5	5	10
Netball	0	10	10
Pétanque	4	8	12
Rowing	25	15	40
Sailing	6	4	10
Sepak takraw	17	8	25
Shooting	8	7	15
Squash	3	3	6
Table tennis	3	2	5
Taekwondo	5	4	9
Tennis	4	4	8
Traditional boat race	14	14	28
Triathlon	2	2	4
Volleyball	12	12	24
Wushu	8	5	13
Others	-10	1	-9
Total	243	153	396

== Medal summary ==
=== Medal by sport ===
Medals by sport
Sport	1st place, gold medalist(s)	2nd place, silver medalist(s)	3rd place, bronze medalist(s)	Total
Athletics	0	2	4	6
Billiards and snooker	1	4	3	8
Boxing	0	0	5	5
Canoeing	2	2	2	6
Judo	2	3	5	10
Pétanque	0	0	1	1
Rowing	0	2	3	5
Sepak takraw	2	1	0	3
Shooting	0	0	2	2
Traditional boat race	1	5	2	8
Wushu	3	3	1	7
Total	11	22	25	58
