= Cambodia at the 2015 SEA Games =

Cambodia at the 2015 Southeast Asian Games
- IOC code: CAM
- NOC: National Olympic Committee of Cambodia
- Website: www.noccambodia.org

in Singapore
- Competitors: 275 in 23 sports
- Officials: 178
- Medals Ranked 8th: Gold 1 Silver 5 Bronze 9 Total 15

Southeast Asian Games appearances (overview)
- 1961; 1965; 1967–1981; 1983; 1985; 1987; 1989–1993; 1995; 1997; 1999; 2001; 2003; 2005; 2007; 2009; 2011; 2013; 2015; 2017; 2019; 2021; 2023; 2025; 2027; 2029

Cambodia competed in the 2015 SEA Games from 5 to 16 June 2015.

== Competitors ==
Sport	Men	Women	Total
Swimming	5	2	7
Athletics	5	0	5
Badminton	6	0	6
Basketball	12	0	12
Boxing	5	1	6
Canoeing	2	0	2
Cycling	5	2	7
Equestrian	4	0	4
Fencing	4	0	4
Football	20	0	20
Golf	3	1	4
Gymnastics–Artistic	1	0	1
Judo	3	1	4
Pétanque	8	8	16
Rugby sevens	10	0	10
Sepak takraw	8	8	16
Table tennis	5	0	5
Taekwondo	7	3	10
Tennis	4	2	6
Traditional boat race	14	0	14
Triathlon	2	0	2
Volleyball	12	0	12
Wushu	5	0	5
Others	23	1	24
Total	163	29	192

== Medal summary ==
=== Medal by sport ===
Medals by sport
Sport	1st place, gold medalist(s)	2nd place, silver medalist(s)	3rd place, bronze medalist(s)	Total
Boxing	0	1	0	1
Pétanque	0	4	5	9
Sepak takraw	1	0	1	2
Taekwondo	0	0	2	2
Tennis	0	0	1	1
Total	1	5	9	15

=== Medal by Date ===
Medals by date
Day	Date	1st place, gold medalist(s)	2nd place, silver medalist(s)	3rd place, bronze medalist(s)	Total
–3	2 June	0	0	0	0
–2	3 June	0	0	0	0
–1	4 June	0	0	0	0
0	5 June	0	0	0	0
1	6 June	1	1	2	4
2	7 June	0	0	0	0
3	8 June	0	2	0	2
4	9 June	0	0	1	1
5	10 June	0	1	0	1
6	11 June	0	0	2	2
7	12 June	0	0	2	2
8	13 June	0	1	1	2
9	14 June	0	0	0	0
10	15 June	0	0	1	1
11	16 June	0	0	0	0
Total		1	5	9	15

=== Medalists ===
Medal	Name	Sport	Event	Date
Gold	Cambodia (Chin Sovannarith, Cheat Khemrin, Ream Sokphearom, Heng Rawut, Treung Ly, Ung Narin, Nang Sopheap & Sopheak Johny)	Sepak takraw	Chinlone-Linking	6 June
Silver	Ven Ratha	Boxing	Men's Light Welter Wt. (64 kg)	10 June
Silver	Sok Chanmean	Pétanque	Men's Shooting	6 June
Silver	Thong Chhoeun	Pétanque	Men's Singles	8 June
Silver	Un Sreya	Pétanque	Women's Singles	8 June
Silver	Cambodia (Ouk Leakhena, Sok Chanmean & Tep Nora)	Pétanque	Mixed Triples	13 June
Bronze	Cambodia (Dy Sopanha & Yim Sophorn)	Pétanque	Men's Doubles	11 June
Bronze	Cambodia (Heng Tha, Sieng Vanna, Tep Nora & Ya Chandararith)	Pétanque	Men's Triples	15 June
Bronze	Cambodia (Ke Leng & Ouk Sreymom)	Pétanque	Women's Doubles	11 June
Bronze	Ke Leng	Pétanque	Women's Shooting	6 June
Bronze	Cambodia (Duch Sophorn & Thong Chhoeun)	Pétanque	Mixed Doubles	9 June
Bronze	Cambodia (Chin Sovannarith, Cheat Khemrin, Ream Sokphearom, Heng Rawut, Treung Ly, Ung Narin, Nang Sopheap & Sopheak Johny)	Sepak takraw	Chinlone-Non-repetition Secondary	6 June
Bronze	Phal Sovannat	Taekwondo	Men's Individual Poomsae	12 June
Bronze	Chhoeung Puthearim	Taekwondo	Women's Under 53 kg	13 June
Bronze	Bun Kenny	Tennis	Men's Singles	12 June

=== Multiple Gold Medalists ===
Name	Sport	Gold	Silver	Bronze	Total
		0	0	0	0
