= Laos at the 2015 SEA Games =

Laos at the 2015 Southeast Asian Games
- IOC code: LAO
- NOC: National Olympic Committee of Lao

in Singapore
- Competitors: 290 in 20 sports
- Officials: 193
- Medals Ranked 9th: Gold 0 Silver 4 Bronze 25 Total 29

Southeast Asian Games appearances
- 1959; 1961; 1965; 1967; 1969; 1971; 1973; 1975–1987; 1989; 1991; 1993; 1995; 1997; 1999; 2001; 2003; 2005; 2007; 2009; 2011; 2013; 2015; 2017; 2019; 2021; 2023; 2025; 2027; 2029

Laos competed in the 2015 Southeast Asian Games from 5 to 16 June 2015.

== Competitors ==
Sport	Men	Women	Total
Swimming	2	2	4
Archery	4	4	8
Athletics	8	5	13
Badminton	4	0	4
Billiards and snooker	4	0	4
Boxing	4	2	6
Cycling	3	0	3
Fencing	3	3	6
Football	20	0	30
Golf	4	0	4
Judo	5	5	10
Pencak silat	7	2	9
Pétanque	7	5	12
Rugby sevens	12	12	24
Sepak takraw	13	5	18
Shooting	3	4	7
Table tennis	3	3	6
Taekwondo	7	5	12
Tennis	3	2	5
Wushu	3	5	8
Others	11	-1	10
Total	130	63	193

== Medal summary ==
=== Medal by sport ===
Medals by sport
Sport	1st place, gold medalist(s)	2nd place, silver medalist(s)	3rd place, bronze medalist(s)	Total
	0	0	0	0
Total	0	0	0	0

=== Medal by Date ===
Medals by date
Day	Date	1st place, gold medalist(s)	2nd place, silver medalist(s)	3rd place, bronze medalist(s)	Total
–3	2 June	0	0	0	0
–2	3 June	0	0	0	0
–1	4 June	0	0	0	0
0	5 June	0	0	0	0
1	6 June	0	0	0	0
2	7 June	0	0	0	0
3	8 June	0	0	0	0
4	9 June	0	0	0	0
5	10 June	0	0	0	0
6	11 June	0	0	0	0
7	12 June	0	0	0	0
8	13 June	0	0	0	0
9	14 June	0	0	0	0
10	15 June	0	0	0	0
11	16 June	0	0	0	0
Total		0	0	0	0

=== Medalists ===
Medal	Name	Sport	Event	Date
Gold				
Silver				
Bronze				

=== Multiple Gold Medalists ===
Name	Sport	Gold	Silver	Bronze	Total
		0	0	0	0
