= 2015 SEA Games =

Multi-sport event in Singapore

XXVIII Southeast Asian Games
- Host city: Singapore
- Motto: Celebrate the Extraordinary
- Nations: 11
- Athletes: 4,370
- Events: 402 in 36 sports
- Opening: 5 June 2015
- Closing: 16 June 2015
- Opened by: Tony Tan; President of Singapore
- Closed by: Tony Tan; President of Singapore
- Athlete's Oath: Lin Qingyi
- Judge's Oath: Mohammad Azhar Yusoff
- Torch lighter: Fandi Ahmad and Irfan Fandi Ahmad
- Main venue: Singapore National Stadium
- Website: 2015 Southeast Asian Games

The 2015 Southeast Asian Games, (Note: Malay: Sukan Asia Tenggara 2015; Chinese: 2015年东南亚运动会; pinyin: 2015 Nián dōngnányà yùndònghuì; Tamil: 2015 தென்கிழக்கு ஆசிய விளையாட்டுப் போட்டிகள்) officially known as the 28th Southeast Asian Games, or the 28th SEA Games, and commonly known as Singapore 2015, were a Southeast Asian multi-sport event held by the city-state of Singapore from 5 to 16 June 2015, It was the fourth time the country hosted the games. Singapore had also hosted the games previously in 1973, 1983 and the 1993 editions.

Singapore was awarded the rights to host the Southeast Asian Games in 2011. The games were held from 5 to 16 June 2015, although several events had commenced from 29 May 2015. Around 4,370 athletes participated at the event, which featured 402 events in 36 sports. It was opened by Tony Tan Keng Yam, the president of Singapore at the aforementioned stadium.

The final medal tally was led by Thailand, which won the most gold medals, followed by host Singapore which won the most medals overall. Several Games and national records were broken during the games. The games were deemed as one of the most successful Southeast Asian games ever hosted with its effective management of cost spent to host the games and well-organised arrangement of public transport by Singapore, as well as the huge effort to promote the games which helped raise the standards of competition amongst the Southeast Asian nations.

== Host city ==
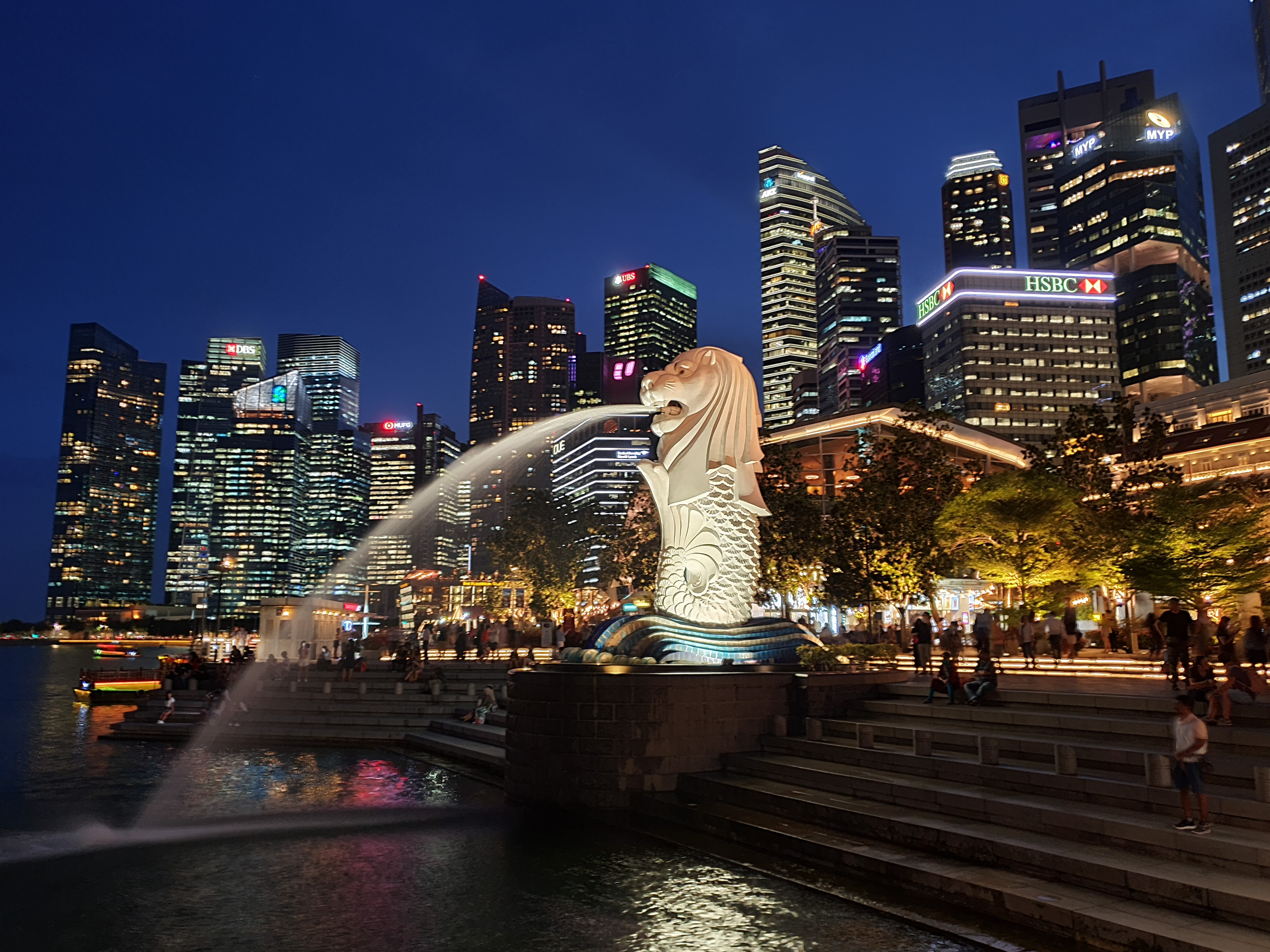
Singapore as the host city of SEA Games 2015.

Singapore's selection as the host of the 28th Southeast Asian Games of 2015 was announced in 2011 during the 26th Southeast Asian Games, held in Indonesian cities Palembang and Jakarta. Singapore had previously been nominated to host the event in 2007 and 2013, but turned down both opportunities citing costs associated with the construction of the new Singapore Sports Hub that was exacerbated by the 2008 financial crisis.

== Development and preparation ==
The Singapore SEA Games Organising Committee (SINGSOC) was formed on 28 June 2012 to oversee the staging of the event.

Steering Committee members of the Games
Position	Name	Designation
Chairman	Mr Lawrence Wong	Acting Minister, Ministry of Culture, Community and Youth. Senior Minister of State, Ministry of Communications and Information
Members	Mr Chan Chun Sing	Minister, Prime Minister's Office
Members	Ms Indranee Rajah	Senior Minister of State, Ministry of Education and Ministry of Law
Members	Mrs Carmee Lim	Founder and President of Aoede Music Enterprise
Members	Mr Low Teo Ping	Vice-President, Singapore National Olympic Council
Members	Mr Masagos Zulkifli	Senior Minister of State, Ministry of Home Affairs and Ministry of Foreign Affairs
Members	Mr Mohamed Abdul Jaleel	Founder and chief executive officer, Mini Environment Service Group
Members	Mr Valerio Nannini	Managing director, Nestle Singapore Pte Ltd
Members	Ms Annabel Pennefather	Vice-President, Singapore National Olympic Council
Members	Mr Brian Richmond	Radio Personality, MediaCorp Pte Ltd
Members	Mr Saktiandi Supaat	Head, FX Research Team, Global Markets, Global Banking, Maybank
Members	Mr Manu Sawhney	Director, Manchester United Limited
Members	Mr Seah Moon Ming	Executive Director and Group CEO of Pavilion Energy Pte Ltd and Pavilion Gas Pte Ltd
Members	Mr Richard Seow Yung Liang	Chairman, Singapore Sports Council
Members	Dr Tan Eng Liang	Vice-President, Singapore National Olympic Council
Members	Ms Jessica Tan Soon Neo	Managing director, Microsoft Singapore
Members	Mr Tan Kian Chew	Group chief executive officer, NTUC FairPrice Co-operative Ltd
Members	Mr Leonard Tan	Founder and chief executive officer, PurpleClick Media Pte Ltd
Members	Mr Stanley Tan	Chairman, National Volunteer & Philanthropy Centre
Members	Mrs Josephine Teo	Senior Minister of State, Ministry of Finance and Ministry of Transport
Members	Mr Teo Ser Luck	Minister of State, Ministry of Trade and Industry and Mayor, North East District

=== Venues ===
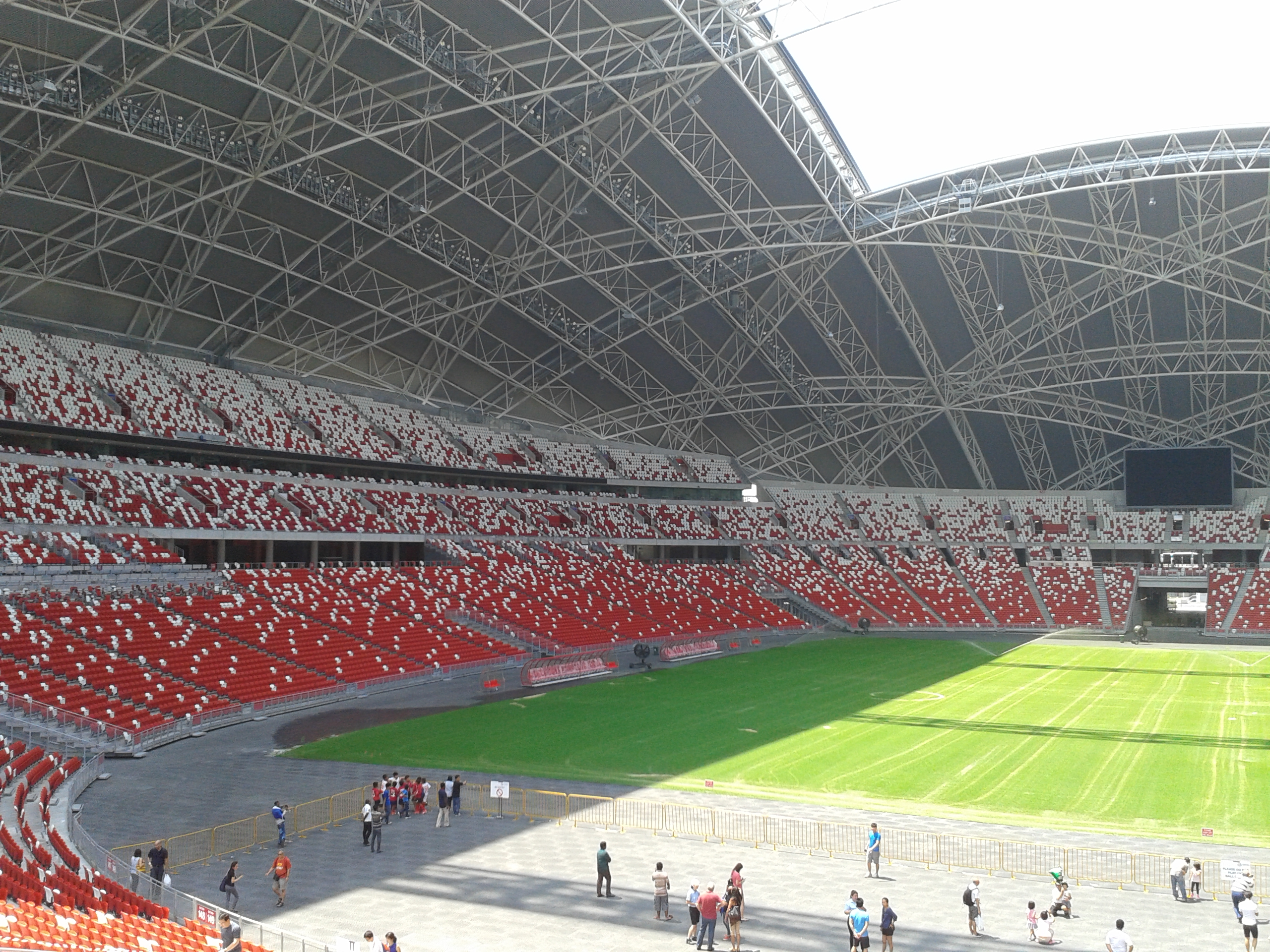
The National Stadium in Singapore, venue of the athletics and football events, and the opening and closing ceremonies for the 28th SEA Games

The 2015 Southeast Asian Games used a mix of new, existing and temporary venues. Given the city-state's compact size, most venues were pre-existing public-sporting facilities located in the suburban heartlands which were reverted to public use after the games. No major retrofitting work were done in most venues as most had been used to host major multi-disciplinary events such as the 2010 Youth Olympic Games.

At the centrepiece of the activities was the Singapore Sports Hub which was completed in mid-2014. Incorporating the new 55,000-seat national stadium, it hosted most of the events.

A games village was not built. Instead, a "village in the city" concept saw athletes and officials housed in 20 hotels in downtown Singapore. Besides being physically near to the Singapore Sports Hub, it was hoped that it will add vibe to the city and reduce post-games costs in converting a dedicated games village to other uses.

The 28th Southeast Asian Games had 30 venues for the games.

Cluster	Competition Venue	Sports
Kallang Cluster	Singapore Sports Hub
Kallang Cluster	Singapore National Stadium	Opening and closing ceremonies, Athletics (track and field), Football (finals)
Kallang Cluster	OCBC Arena Hall 1	Netball, Basketball
Kallang Cluster	OCBC Arena Hall 2	Fencing, Volleyball
Kallang Cluster	OCBC Arena Hall 4	Billiards & snooker
Kallang Cluster	Singapore Indoor Stadium	Table tennis, Badminton
Kallang Cluster	OCBC Aquatic Centre	Aquatics (diving, swimming, synchronised swimming, water polo)
Kallang Cluster	Other
Kallang Cluster	Kallang Squash Centre	Squash (singles, team)
Kallang Cluster	Kallang Tennis Centre	Tennis
Kallang Cluster	Kallang Cricket Field	Archery
Kallang Cluster	Kallang Softball Field	Softball
Kallang Cluster	Kallang Practice Track	Athletics (marathon)
Singapore Expo	Expo Hall 1	Boxing, Sepak takraw
Singapore Expo	Expo Hall 2	Judo, Pencak silat, Taekwondo, Wushu
Marina Cluster	Marina Bay	Traditional Boat Race, Sailing (keelboat)
Marina Cluster	Marina Bay South	Cycling
Marina Cluster	Marina Channel	Canoeing, Rowing
Other
Other	Bedok Reservoir	Water Ski
Other	Bishan Sports Hall	Gymnastics
Other	Bishan Stadium	Football
Other	Jalan Besar Stadium	Football
Other	Choa Chu Kang Stadium	Rugby sevens
Other	East Coast Park	Athletics (20 km walk), Triathlon
Other	ITE Central	Floorball
Other	National Sailing Centre	Sailing
Other	National Shooting Centre	Shooting (outdoors)
Other	Orchid Country Club	Bowling
Other	Padang	Pétanque
Other	Sengkang Hockey Stadium	Field hockey
Other	Sentosa Golf Club	Golf
Other	Turf Club Riding Centre	Equestrian
Other	Tanglin Club	Squash (jumbo doubles)
Other	SAFRA Yishun	Shooting (indoors)

=== Public transport ===
Given the existing extensive public transport network already in place, there is no games-specific major infrastructural development to support it. The clustering of venues is aimed at easing the traffic flow, charted bus and MRT services for athletes and officials were provided.

=== Volunteers ===
The organisers estimated that about 15,000 volunteers are needed to successfully host the games. Volunteer recruitment began in late 2013, and by February 2014, about 5,000 volunteers have already signed up. This number swelled to over 17,000 by February 2015, and a volunteers night event was held at Universal Studios Singapore to launch the sports volunteers brand name as "Team Nila" and to thank the volunteers who have signed up with free shows at the venue. Amongst the pool of 17,000 volunteers, 35% came from the community, while 65% were from corporations in support of the games.

=== Ticketing ===
A total of about 790,000 tickets were put on online sale from February 2015, at the Singapore Indoor Stadium and at SingPost outlets. To encourage public participation in the games, it was announced on 28 January 2015 that 18 of the sports will be free for spectators, while the other 18 are kept at relatively affordable levels of between S$5 to S$20. By 15 April 2015 some sports such as swimming and fencing were selling fast, while silat and sepak takraw were much less popular. Organisers reported that ticket sales were pass 70% for most sports by 27 April, with fencing and swimming being the most popular at 85 and 70% tickets sold respectively, while rhythmic gymnastics, silat and wushu have also sold over 70%. Billiards and snooker, equestrian, sepak takraw, taekwondo, and artistic gymnastics have sold about half their tickets. Rugby and judo have sold 30%, while table tennis has sold only 20%.

Priced between S$5 to S$20, priority sales for the opening and closing ceremonies tickets for those who registered theirs interests in 2014 began on 15 January 2015, while sales for the general public began on 22 January 2015. In February 2015, tickets to the opening ceremony were going at over seven times their original value on unauthorised websites, despite 40% of the tickets still available at that time. By March 2015, tickets to the opening ceremony were sold out.

=== Countdown ===
During the closing ceremony of the 2013 Southeast Asian Games, the SEAG Flag was formally handed over from Myanmar to Singapore. This was followed by a song and dance section highlighting Singapore as the next venue.

On 27 June 2014, a series of festivities were held at the Singapore Sports Hub, including a fireworks display, to mark the one-year countdown to the games. The Sports Hub Community Open House was held in conjunction with the launch to introduce the new sports facilities to the general public.

The countdown to the games began on 15 February 2014 with a launch party at the Gardens by the Bay, where the logo, theme and mascot were also introduced.

800 Nanyang Polytechnic students organised a major countdown event on 11 April 2015 to mark the final 50 days in a few days, where about 4,000 people turned up to attend a concert and a sports carnival.

On 16 April 2015, the 50-day countdown began with various organisations stacking a number each through a video tribute. This included: Nanyang Polytechnic and Ang Mo Kio residents and Changkat Primary School (50), London School of Business and Finance Singapore (49), Compassvale Primary School (48), Development Bank of Singapore (47), National Kidney Foundation (46), CWT Limited (45), SportCares (44), Park View Primary School (43), Sport Singapore (42) and 41st Battalion Singapore Armoured Regiment (41).

Other organisations were:

- Corporation Primary School (40)
- Wengsworld Jigsaw Puzzles (39)
- Henry Park Primary School (38)
- Woodlands Ring Primary School (37)
- Yio Chu Kang Community Sports Club (36)
- Temasek Primary School (35)
- East Coast Primary School (34)
- Yayasan Mendaki and Woodlands Secondary School (33)
- Team Singapore (32)
- Fuchun Secondary School (31)
- Jiemin Primary School (30)
- Tampines Primary School (29)
- Punggol Green Primary School (28)
- Northland Primary School (27)
- Telok Kurau Primary School (26)
- Temasek Polytechnic (25)
- AXA Singapore (24)
- Nanyang Polytechnic (23)
- Shelton College International (22)
- Tampines North Primary School (21)
- Ministry of Social and Family (20)
- Dunman Secondary School (19)
- NTUC FairPrice and Seng Kang Primary School (18)
- Canberra Primary School (17)
- Ferrari Owners' Club (16)
- Compassvale Secondary School (15)
- Pasir Ris West (14)
- Republic Polytechnic and Teck Ghee Primary School (13)
- LionsXII (12)
- Deli Hub Catering (11)
- Sembawang Primary School (10)
- Rajah & Tann and St Joseph's Institution Junior (9)
- Qihua Primary School (8)
- Singapore Polytechnic and Fernvale Primary School (7)
- Singtel (6)
- Dazhong Primary School and One KM (5)
- Scuderia FSG (4)
- United Square (3)
- Deloitte (2)
- Montfort Junior School and Team Nila Volunteers (1)

=== Security ===
2015 Southeast Asian Games medals

The principal agency to ensure the security of the games is the Singapore Police Force, supplemented by the Auxiliary Police Forces. The organisers singled out security as one of their major concerns ahead of the games, with concerns over unforeseen security breaches which may occur across any of the venues, some of which are easily accessible by the public.

=== Medals ===
The designs of the medals were unveiled on 27 April 2015. Designed by Joys Tan from Sport Singapore, they featured the Games' logo on one side, and the Singapore Sports Hub on the reverse. Each medal measured 80mm in diameter and weighed 183 grams. It was also announced during the media brief that smaller versions of the medal, in the form of medallions, would be given to all spectators of the closing ceremony.

=== Costs ===
The games were budgeted to cost SG$325 million (US$287 million) but the eventual cost came to SG$264 million. There were concerns the cost would exceed budget, as had happened when Singapore hosted the Youth Olympics in 2010. In contrast, the cost of organising the 2013 games, which was hosted by Myanmar, was estimated to be SGD400 million.

=== Torch relay ===
The torch relay took place on 4 June 2015, the eve of the games' opening ceremony began with the torch lit at the Marina Bay Promontory, and went past Clifford Square, Merlion Park, Esplanade Plaza, the Art Science Museum and end at Marina Bay Sands, where the flame handover ceremony to the Games officials took place.

== Marketing ==
Nila, the lion, official mascot of the games.

Nila wears either his signature tracksuit (left) or blue sporting attire (right), depending on the occasion.

=== Motto ===
The motto of the 2015 Southeast Asian Games and ASEAN Para Games is "Celebrate the Extraordinary". It was chosen to represent the connection of individuals, communities and countries to their own dreams beyond competing, winning or overcoming defeat and the inspiration of the soul and spirit inside each people of Southeast Asia.

=== Logo ===
The logo of the 2015 Southeast Asian Games is an image depicts a winning athlete crossing the finishing line with his/her arms raised in victory represents the potential that exists in every participating athletes. The five figure of the sport events competed represent the diversity of sports featured in the Games, the strength and the skills of the athletes. The palette of colours represents the exciting moments of the games and Sport as a tool of uniting people of the region regardless of their language, belief and colours. Overall, it represents the unity of Southeast Asian people in the spirit of the games. The logo also depicts the Southeast Asian Games Federation logo and the word "28th SEA Games". The word "Singapore 2015" on the finishing tape represents Singapore as the host of the 2015 Southeast Asian Games.

=== Mascot ===
The mascot of the 2015 Southeast Asian Games and ASEAN Para Games is a lion named Nila. The name comes from Sang Nila Utama, the founder of Singapura. Nila has a red mane and heart-shaped face and is described as courage, passionate and friendly. He wears either his signature tracksuit or blue sporting attire, depending on the occasion.

=== Songs ===
A special compilation album titled Songs of the Games was produced by veteran music director Sydney Tan and released on 3 March 2015. It features the three official theme songs: "Unbreakable" written by Amir Masoh and performed by Tabitha Nauser, "Greatest" by Daphne Khoo and "Ordinary" written by Amir Masoh and performed by The Sam Willows. The other songs included: "You're Wonderful" written by Amir Masoh and performed by Tay Kewei, Gayle Nerva and Tabitha Nauser, "Flags Up" written and performed by The Sam Willows, "Champion" written by Charlie Lim and performed by The Sam Willows, "Still" written and performed by Charlie Lim, "A Love Song-Unbreakable" written by Don Richmond and performed by Benjamin Kheng, "Forever" written by Joshua Wan and performed by The Steve McQueens, "You're almost There" written and performed by Joel and co-written by Ruth Ling, "Dancing on the world" written and performed by HubbaBubbas, "Colours" written and performed by Jean Tan and "Reach" written by Dick Lee and performed by the MGS Choir featuring Dick Lee.

=== Sponsors ===
A total of 100 sponsors, comprising 4 main sponsors, 10 official sponsors, 27 official partners and 59 official supporters contributed to the 2015 Southeast Asian Games.

Sponsors of the 2015 SEA Games
Main Sponsors
- Deloitte
- Mediacorp
- NTUC FairPrice
- Singtel
Official Sponsors
- Anderco
- Atos
- Daikin
- DBS Bank
- FBT
- Kingsmen Creatives
- Kubota
- Samsung Electronics
- UnionPay
- Volvo Cars
Official Partners
- 100plus
- Arina International Holding
- Cosmoprof Academy
- Changi Airport
- Eng Leong Medallic Industries
- Esri
- Focus Media
- Gold Peak
- Hexogon Solution
- JK Technology
- Kerry Meridian
- McDonald's
- Nestlé (Milo)
- Mount Elizabeth
- OCBC Bank
- Pilot Pen
- Positive Intentions
- Rajah & Tann
- Resorts World Sentosa
- SAFRA Radio
- Sentosa Golf Club
- Singapore Airlines
- Singapore Sports Hub
- Suntec Singapore International Convention and Exhibition Centre
- The Show Company
- Weber Shandwick
- Yonex
Official Supporters
- Aggreko
- Aleoca Pro
- APACTix
- Averasia
- Bert Lighting House
- Big3 Productions
- Big Ass Fans
- Block Up!
- ComfortDelGro
- ConSurf
- CWT
- Donic
- DP Architects
- Elsie's Kitchen
- EVS Broadcast Equipment SA
- Freeflow Productions
- Gardens by the Bay
- Global Healthcare
- Haw Par Corporation (Tiger Balm)
- iFly Singapore
- Instant Replay Productions
- Kryolan
- Kai Guan
- KK Women's and Children's Hospital
- La France Boule
- Leeden Nox
- Little Red Ants
- Marathon
- Marketing Institute of Singapore
- MGG Software
- Mikasa Sports
- Molten Corporation
- Monstrou Studio
- Multiheight Scaffolding
- Nexter Systems
- Ninebot
- Old Chang Kee
- Osim International
- Radius
- Repucom
- SAFRA National Service Association
- SATS
- Seven Seas-Sportflex
- Shimano
- Showtech Group
- Sin Chew
- Singapore Grand Prix
- SingHealth
- SportPsych Consulting
- Stamford Catering Services
- Starcom MediaVest Group
- Tai Sun
- Tanglin Club
- Trishaw Uncle
- TTG Publishing
- Tube Gallery
- UE Power & Resources
- Wiraka
- Yoguru

== The Games ==
=== Opening ceremony ===
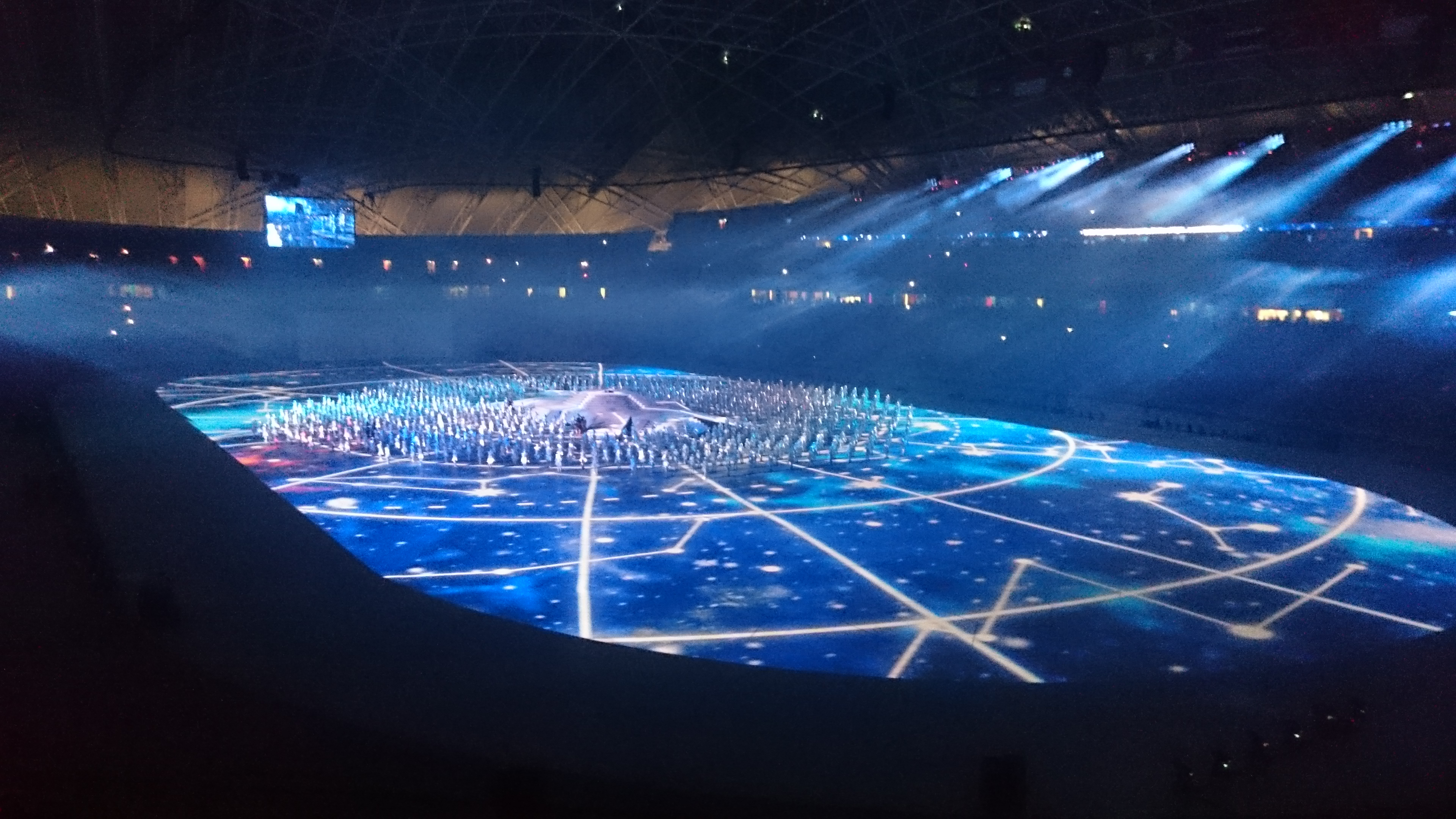
Opening ceremony

The opening ceremony was held on Friday, 5 June 2015, beginning at 20:15 SST (UTC+8) at the National Stadium in Singapore, the first major opening ceremony for a sporting event in the new venue. Organised by the Singapore Armed Forces, which has also been responsible for the annual National Day Parade, they were supported by a creative team with Beatrice Chia-Richmond serving as Creative Director. The ceremony was helmed by more than 5,000 performers and volunteers and supported by 3,500 soldiers. Given the enclosed nature of the stadium, extensive use of an aerial system to allow suspension and movement of performers and props were possible. Floor projections was accomplished using 160 multimedia high-definition projectors. The time 20:15 was chosen to start the opening ceremony to mark the year 2015, the year which Singapore hosted the 28th Southeast Asian Games.

Tony Tan Keng Yam, President of Singapore declared the games open, while former footballer, Fandi Ahmad and his son and current footballer, Irfan Fandi lit the cauldron.

=== Closing ceremony ===
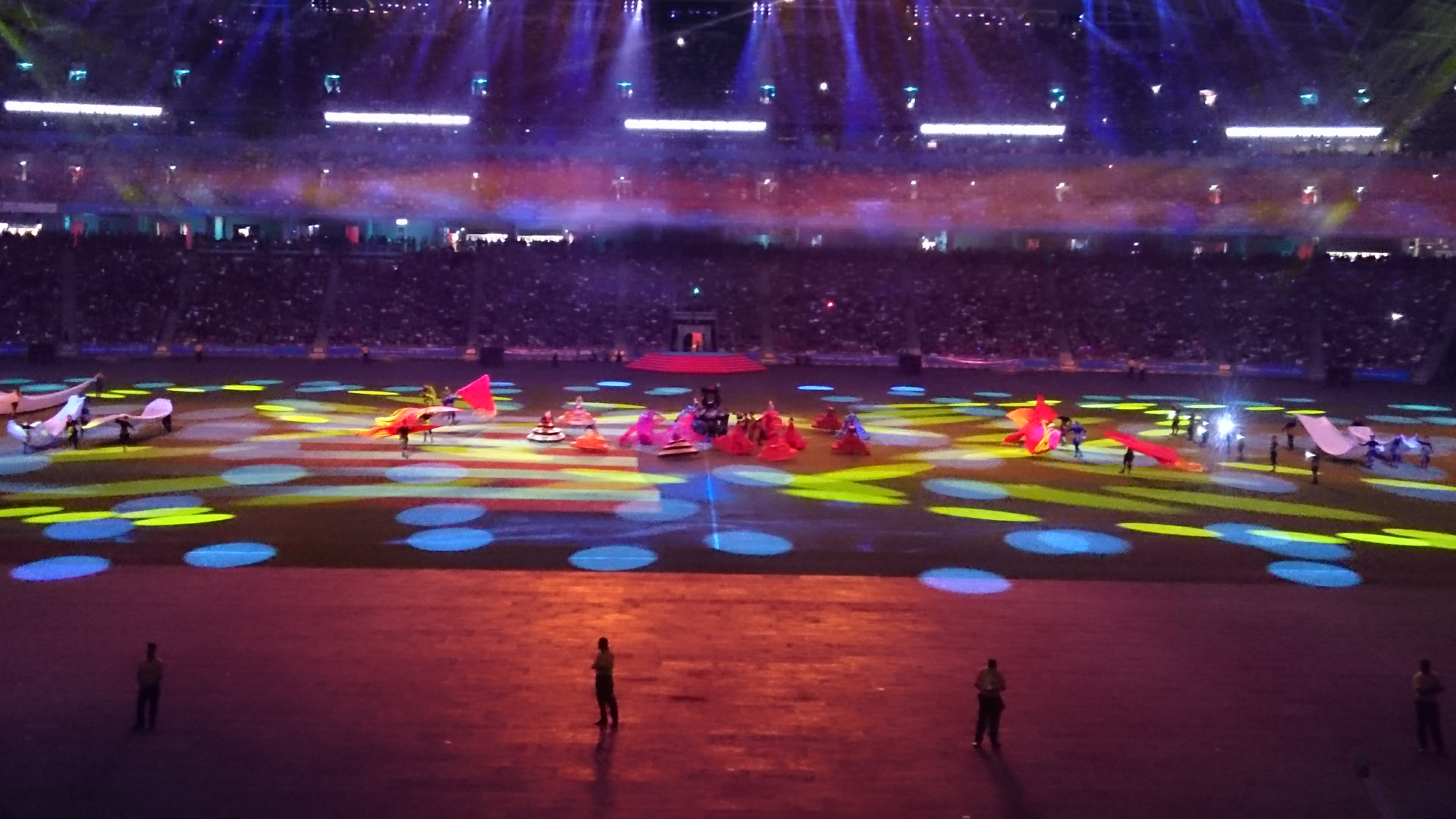
Cultural presentation of Malaysia, host of the 2017 edition

The Games had its closing ceremony held on Tuesday, 16 June 2015, from 20:00 SST (UTC+8) at the National Stadium in Singapore. The ceremony begins with a countdown footage video followed by hosts of the ceremony enter the stadium in a buggy car who are also hosts of the games opening ceremony. Singapore president and the other VIPs including Lawrence Wong, Minister for Culture, Community and Youth and SEA Games Organising Committee chairman and Tan Chuan Jin, the Singapore Olympic Council and Southeast Asian Games Federation president then enter the stadium and after that a video about the games' wonderful moments is played. Athletes of every participating nations along with their respective head of mission paraded into the stadium onto the stadium floor to the beat of music – Remix of the Songs of the Games played through the stadium, followed by the video tribute of the games volunteers, Team Nila.

Team Nila then entered the stadium and danced to the music played. Ng Ser Miang, IOC member and IOC Finance Commission Chairman awarded Lawrence Wong and Singaporean SEA Games President, Tan Chuan-Jin the IOC President trophy of the Olympics spirit on behalf of Thomas Bach, president of the International Olympic Committee. Tan Chuan-Jin then delivered a closing speech, in which he includes an emotional quote, paying tribute to all victims of the 2015 Sabah earthquake in which many Singaporean primary school students from Tanjong Katong Primary School died and all the national flags of the participating nations and the games flags been flown at half-mast on 8 June 2015 during the games. The Singapore president declared the games closed with Charlie Lim later performed the song, "Still" as the games flag and the SEA Games Federation flag were lowered and the flame of the cauldron extinguished. A group of torch bearer surrounded the cauldron lighter which sends off the firework after they had extinguished the flame of their torch. A bunch of fireworks then erupted over the National Stadium, signalling the official conclusion of the Games.

The SEA Games responsibilities was officially handed over to Malaysia, host of the 2017 Southeast Asian Games in which Khairy Jamaluddin, Minister of Youth and Sports of Malaysia receive the flag of the Southeast Asian Games Federation from Lawrence Wong and Tunku Imran, the Olympic Council of Malaysia president and in-coming Southeast Asian Games Federation president as its symbol during a flag handover ceremony. The national anthem of Malaysia was played as the National Flag of Malaysia was raised. A 10-minute Malaysian segment performance: "Diversity in Motion" (Malay: Majmuk dalam Gerak), was performed by Malaysian dancers with Monoloque and Najwa Mahiaddin sang "The Birth of a Legend" (Malay: Lahirnya Lagenda) on the stage. The performance was divided into three parts: "Birth", "Rooted", and "United". Birth told the story of the beginning of life and creativity, Rooted told the story about building the foundation, desire for unity, understanding one's origin, living in the moment while remembering yesterday and to celebrate the aesthetics of athleticism today, while the conclusion United told the story of desire for unity in diversity.

A Singapore farewell segment performance is later performed with a parade of colonial era, people, symbols, uniform groups, landmarks, government policy and 1993 Southeast Asian Games stamps and objects such as Chinese Junk and Sail boat and the Singapore Airlines Airbus A380 aircraft, brought back the nation's historical memory in the past 60 years. For a brief moment, performers some dressed as Nila and others wearing the Nila suit dance to the music played. The ceremony concludes with a party with music spun by Dutch DJ Ferry Corsten, a performance by local fusion Jazz group The Steve McQueens and a bunch of fireworks erupted over the stadium again and for the last time.

=== Participating nations ===
An estimated total of 4,490 athletes (about 2,610 men, 1,880 women) from 11 nations competed at the 2015 Southeast Asian Games.

- Brunei (82)
- Cambodia (192)
- Timor-Leste (66)
- Indonesia (529)
- Laos (193)
- Malaysia (659)
- Myanmar (396)
- Philippines (466)
- Singapore (771) (host)
- Thailand (765)
- Vietnam (391)

=== Sports ===
The first 30 sports were announced by the Singapore National Olympic Council on 10 December 2013 on the sidelines of the 27th SEA Games in Myanmar. It announced then that there was room for as many as eight more sports. On 29 April 2014, the final six sports, namely boxing, equestrian, floorball, petanque, rowing, and volleyball were added to the programme. Floorball will feature in the event for the first time after being a demonstration sport in the 2013 edition.

In its selection of events, the organising committee indicated their desire to set a model for subsequent games in trimming the number of "traditional" sports to refocus on the SEAG's initial intent to increase the level of sporting excellence in key sports. Hence, despite room for up to eight traditional sports, only two, floorball and netball, were included in the programme. Amongst the other 34 sports, 24 are Olympic sports and all remaining sports are featured in the Asian Games.

The 2015 Southeast Asian Games programme was featured 402 events in 36 sports and disciplines. The number of events in each discipline is noted in parentheses.

- Aquatics
  - Diving (8)
  - Swimming (38)
  - Synchronised swimming (3)
  - Water polo (2)
- Archery (10)
- Athletics (46)
- Badminton (7)
- Basketball (2)
- Billiards and snooker (10)¹
- Bowling (10)
- Boxing (11)
- Canoeing (17)
- Cycling (6)
- Equestrian (4)
- Fencing (12)
- Floorball (2)³
- Football (1)
- Golf (4)
- Gymnastics (16)
- Field hockey (2)
- Judo (12)
- Netball (1)
- Pencak silat (13) ²
- Pétanque (10) ²
- Rowing (18)
- Rugby sevens (2)
- Sailing (20)
- Sepak takraw (10) ¹
- Shooting (26)
- Softball (2)
- Squash (5)
- Table tennis (7)
- Taekwondo (15)
- Tennis (7)
- Traditional boat race (8)²
- Triathlon (2)
- Volleyball (2)
- Waterskiing (11)
- Wushu (20) ¹

¹ – not an official Olympic Sport.
² – sport played only in the SEAGF.
³ – not a traditional Olympic nor SEAGF Sport and introduced only by the host country.

=== Calendar ===
OC	Opening ceremony	●	Event competitions	1	Gold medal events	CC	Closing ceremony

May / June	29 Fri	30 Sat	31 Sun	1 Mon	2 Tue	3 Wed	4 Thu	5 Fri	6 Sat	7 Sun	8 Mon	9 Tue	10 Wed	11 Thu	12 Fri	13 Sat	14 Sun	15 Mon	16 Tue	Events
Ceremonies								OC											CC	—N/a
Archery													●	●	●	5	5			10
Athletics									2	2		8	12	12	10					46
Badminton													●	●	2	●	●	●	5	7
Basketball												●	●	●	●	●	●	2		2
Billiards & snooker									●	2	2	3	3							10
Bowling												2	2	2	2	●	2			10
Boxing									●	●	●		11							11
Canoeing									5		3	9								17
Cycling														2	2	1	1			6
Diving									2	2	2	2								8
Equestrian								●	1	●	1	1	1							4
Fencing						3	3		3	3										12
Field hockey									●	●	●	●	●		●	1	1			2
Floorball												●	●	●	●	●	2			2
Football	●	●	●	●	●	●	●		●	●	●	●	●	●		●		1		1
Golf												●	●	●	4					4
Gymnastics									1	1	2	5	5				2			16
Judo									5	5	2									12
Netball			●	●	●	●	●		●	1										1
Pencak silat													●	●	●	3	10			13
Pétanque									2	●	2	1	●	2	●	1	●	2		10
Rowing														8	●	●	10			18
Rugby sevens									●	2										2
Sailing									●	1	4	●	●	4	●	4	7			20
Sepaktakraw									2	2	●	1	●	●	1	2	●	2		10
Shooting									4	6	2	2	4	2	4	2				26
Softball									●	●	●	●	2							2
Squash												●	2	●	●	2	●	1		5
Swimming									6	6	7	6	6	7						38
Synchronised swimming					●	1	2													3
Table tennis				●	2	1	2		●	●	2									7
Taekwondo															7	4	4			15
Tennis									●	●	●	2	●	●	●	2	3			7
Traditional boat race									4	4										8
Triathlon									1	1										2
Volleyball													●	●	●	●	●	1	1	2
Water polo													●	●	●	●	●	1	1	2
Waterskiing														●	4	4	3			11
Wushu									4	7	9									20
Daily medal events	0	0	0	0	2	5	7	0	42	45	38	42	48	39	36	31	50	10	7	402
Cumulative total	0	0	0	0	2	7	14	14	56	101	149	181	229	268	304	335	385	395	402	402
May / June	29 Fri	30 Sat	31 Sun	1 Mon	2 Tue	3 Wed	4 Thu	5 Fri	6 Sat	7 Sun	8 Mon	9 Tue	10 Wed	11 Thu	12 Fri	13 Sat	14 Sun	15 Mon	16 Tue	Total events

== Medal table ==
The 2015 Southeast Asian Games featured 402 events, resulting in 402 medal sets to be distributed.

An additional gold medal was awarded as there was first-place tie in the Rhythmic Gymnastics individual all-around event. As a consequence, no silver medal was awarded in that event.

Two bronze medals were awarded in some events: most events in martial arts (2 in Wushu, 12 in Taekwondo, 10 in Pencak silat, 12 in Judo, 11 in Boxing and 12 in Fencing) and All events in racket sports (10 in Billiards and snooker, 5 in Squash, 7 in Badminton, 7 in Table tennis, 7 in Tennis, 10 in Petanque, 10 in Sepak takraw, 1 in netball and 2 in volleyball), giving a total of 118 additional bronze medals. On the other hand, No bronze medal was awarded at the Rhythmic Gymnastics group all-around event, Women's Floorball, Taekwondo Poomsae Women's team, Kyorugi Men's 74 kg and Women's 62 kg event and Sailing Men's Match Racing Keelboat, Team Racing Laser Standard and Women's 470, Skiff 49er FX, Laser Radial (U19) and Team Racing Laser Radial event.

As a result, total of 1,313 medals comprising 403 gold medals, 401 silver medals and 509 bronze medals were awarded to athletes.

* Host nation (Singapore)

2015 Southeast Asian Games medal table
Rank	NOC	Gold	Silver	Bronze	Total
1	Thailand	95	83	69	247
2	Singapore*	84	73	102	259
3	Vietnam	73	53	60	186
4	Malaysia	62	58	66	186
5	Indonesia	47	61	74	182
6	Philippines	29	36	66	131
7	Myanmar	12	26	31	69
8	Cambodia	1	5	9	15
9	Laos	0	4	25	29
10	Brunei	0	1	6	7
11	Timor-Leste	0	1	1	2
Totals (11 entries)		403	401	509	1,313

Source: 2015 SEA Games Medal Standings

== Broadcasting ==
The games also available internationally via Sports Singapore's YouTube channel whose broadcast was done by International Games Broadcast Services (IGBS) as production partner of MediaCorp – the host broadcaster of the games. The International Broadcast Centre was located within the sports city area.

Key

* Host nation (Singapore)

2015 SEA Games Broadcasters rights in Southeast Asia
IOC Code	Country	Broadcast network
BRU	Brunei	Radio Televisyen Brunei; Kristal-Astro
CAM	Cambodia	National Television of Kampuchea
INA	Indonesia	Emtek; TVRI
LAO	Laos	Lao National Television
MAS	Malaysia	Media Prima Berhad; Astro
MYA	Myanmar	Myanmar Radio and Television
PHI	Philippines	Sports5
SIN	Singapore*	MediaCorp TV
THA	Thailand	Television Pool of Thailand (TPT)
TLS	Timor-Leste	Radio-Televisão Timor Leste
VIE	Vietnam	VTC; VTV

== See also ==
- 2015 ASEAN Para Games

== Notes ==
Preceded by Naypyidaw	Southeast Asian Games; Singapore; XXVIII Southeast Asian Games (2015)	Succeeded by Kuala Lumpur
