= Cambodian Federation of Rugby =

Sports governing body in Cambodia

- Sport: Rugby union
- Founded: 2002
- Asia Rugby affiliation: 2004

The Cambodian Federation of Rugby (CFR) is the governing body of rugby in Cambodia.

== History ==
The federation was founded in 2002 and was re-admitted to Asia Rugby in 2020 after having been expelled in 2016 following internal conflict.

== See also ==
- Rugby union in Cambodia
- Cambodia national rugby union team
- Cambodia national rugby sevens team
