= Squash at the 2015 SEA Games =

- Venue: Kallang Squash Centre; Tanglin Club (Jumbo Doubles)
- Dates: 9 to 15 June 2015
- Competitors: 41 from 6 nations

Squash at the 2015 Southeast Asian Games was held in Kallang Squash Centre, in Kallang, Singapore from 9 to 15 June 2015.

== Participating nations ==
A total of 41 athletes from six nations will be competing in squash at the 2015 Southeast Asian Games:

- Indonesia (7)
- Malaysia (8)
- Myanmar (6)
- Philippines (4)
- Singapore (8)
- Thailand (8)

== Medalists ==
Event	Gold	Silver	Bronze
Men's singles	Sanjay Singh Chal; Malaysia	Addeen Idrakie; Malaysia	Bryan Koh; Singapore
Men's singles	Sanjay Singh Chal; Malaysia	Addeen Idrakie; Malaysia	Samuel Kang; Singapore
Men's team	Malaysia (MAS); Addeen Idrakie; Valentino Bong; Mohd Syafiq Kamal; Sanjay Singh Chal	Singapore (SIN); Samuel Kang; Bryan Koh; Phua Jia Hui Marcus; Vivian Rhamanan	Indonesia (INA); Ade Furkon; Sandi Arisma Perdana; Eris Setiawan; Syauma Siswa
Men's team	Malaysia (MAS); Addeen Idrakie; Valentino Bong; Mohd Syafiq Kamal; Sanjay Singh Chal	Singapore (SIN); Samuel Kang; Bryan Koh; Phua Jia Hui Marcus; Vivian Rhamanan	Philippines (PHI); Ricky Espinola; Robert Andrew Garcia; David William Pelino
Men's jumbo doubles	Singapore (SIN); Phua Jia Hui Marcus; Vivian Rhamanan	Indonesia (INA); Ade Furkon; Sandi Arisma Perdana	Philippines (PHI); Ricky Espinola; David William Pelino
Men's jumbo doubles	Singapore (SIN); Phua Jia Hui Marcus; Vivian Rhamanan	Indonesia (INA); Ade Furkon; Sandi Arisma Perdana	Thailand (THA); Phuwis Poonsiri; Chatchnwin Tangjaitrong
Women's singles	Rachel Arnold; Malaysia	Vanessa Raj Gnanasigamani; Malaysia	Jemyca Aribado; Philippines
Women's singles	Rachel Arnold; Malaysia	Vanessa Raj Gnanasigamani; Malaysia	Mao Shi Yuan; Singapore
Women's team	Malaysia (MAS); Rachel Arnold; Zulhijjah Binti Azan; Teh Min Jie; Vanessa Raj Gnanasigamani	Indonesia (INA); Yeni Siti Rohmah; Catur Yuliana; Irma Maryani	Singapore (SIN); Nur Adawiyah Abdul Aziz; Shi Yuan Mao; Hui Zhong J. Teo; Joannah L.W. Yue
Women's team	Malaysia (MAS); Rachel Arnold; Zulhijjah Binti Azan; Teh Min Jie; Vanessa Raj Gnanasigamani	Indonesia (INA); Yeni Siti Rohmah; Catur Yuliana; Irma Maryani	Thailand (THA); Anantana Prasertratanakul; Panisa Suwanarat; Tuddaw Thamronglarb

== Medal table ==
* Host nation (Singapore)

Rank	Nation	Gold	Silver	Bronze	Total
1	Malaysia (MAS)	4	2	0	6
2	Singapore (SIN)*	1	1	4	6
3	Indonesia (INA)	0	2	1	3
4	Philippines (PHI)	0	0	3	3
5	Thailand (THA)	0	0	2	2
Totals (5 entries)		5	5	10	20
