= Rugby sevens at the 2015 SEA Games – Men's tournament =

2015 rugby tournament

Rugby sevens at the 2015 Southeast Asian Games – Men's tournament
Tournament details
- Host: Singapore
- Venue: Choa Chu Kang Stadium
- Date: 6–7 June 2015
- Countries: Cambodia; Laos; Malaysia; Philippines; Singapore; Thailand
- Teams: 6

Final positions
- Champions: Philippines
- Runner-up: Malaysia
- Third place: Singapore
- Fourth place: Thailand

Tournament statistics
- Matches played: 18

The 2015 Men's Southeast Asian Games Rugby sevens Tournament was held in Choa Chu Kang Stadium, Singapore from 6 to 7 June 2015.

In the final, the Philippines beat Malaysia to win the gold medal.

== Results ==
Pos	Team	Pld	W	D	L	PF	PA	PD	Pts	Final Result
1	Philippines	5	5	0	0	153	20	+133	20	Advanced to Final
2	Malaysia	5	3	0	2	136	35	+101	14	Advanced to Final
3	Thailand	5	3	0	2	164	63	+101	14	Advanced to Bronze medal match
4	Singapore (H)	5	3	0	2	126	36	+90	14	Advanced to Bronze medal match
5	Laos	5	0	1	4	14	220	−206	6	Advanced to 5th–6th place playoff
6	Cambodia	5	0	1	4	14	233	−219	6	Advanced to 5th–6th place playoff

Source: Seagames 2015
(H) Hosts

=== Preliminary round ===
6 June 2015
10:00

Laos	0 – 40	Malaysia
	Report

Choa Chu Kang Stadium

6 June 2015
10:25

Cambodia	0 – 36	Singapore
	Report

Choa Chu Kang Stadium

6 June 2015
10:50

Thailand	10 – 24	Philippines
	Report

Choa Chu Kang Stadium

6 June 2015
12:30

Cambodia	14 – 14	Laos
	Report

Choa Chu Kang Stadium

6 June 2015
12:55

Malaysia	29 – 7	Thailand
	Report

Choa Chu Kang Stadium

6 June 2015
13:20

Singapore	0 – 17	Philippines
	Report

Choa Chu Kang Stadium

6 June 2015
15:00

Laos	0 – 57	Thailand
	Report

Choa Chu Kang Stadium

6 June 2015
15:25

Cambodia	0 – 55	Philippines
	Report

Choa Chu Kang Stadium

6 June 2015
15:50

Singapore	14 – 5	Malaysia
	Report

Choa Chu Kang Stadium

7 June 2015
10:00

Laos	0 – 43	Philippines
	Report

Choa Chu Kang Stadium

7 June 2015
10:25

Cambodia	0 – 52	Malaysia
	Report

Choa Chu Kang Stadium

7 June 2015
10:50

Thailand	14 – 10	Singapore
	Report

Choa Chu Kang Stadium

7 June 2015
12:30

Laos	0 – 66	Singapore
	Report

Choa Chu Kang Stadium

7 June 2015
12:55

Cambodia	0 – 76	Thailand
	Report

Choa Chu Kang Stadium

7 June 2015
13:20

Malaysia	10 – 14	Philippines
	Report

Choa Chu Kang Stadium

=== 5th–6th place playoff ===
7 June 2015
15:00

Laos	26 – 10	Cambodia
	Report

Choa Chu Kang Stadium

=== Third place match ===
7 June 2015
15:50

Thailand	0 – 21	Singapore
	Report

Choa Chu Kang Stadium

=== Final ===
7 June 2015
16:45

Philippines	24 – 7	Malaysia
	Report

Choa Chu Kang Stadium

== Final standing ==
Rank	Team
1st place, gold medalist(s)	Philippines
2nd place, silver medalist(s)	Malaysia
3rd place, bronze medalist(s)	Singapore
4	Thailand
5	Laos
6	Cambodia

Rugby Sevens at the 2015 Southeast Asian Games champions

Philippines
1st title
