= Bowling at the 2015 SEA Games =

2015 SEA Games event

- Venue: Orchid Country Club
- Dates: 9–14 June 2015
- Competitors: 75 from 7 nations

Bowling at the 2015 SEA Games were held in Orchid Country Club, Singapore from 9 to 14 June 2015. Ten competitions were held in men's and women's singles, men's and women's doubles, men's and women's trios, men's and women's teams of five, and men's and women's masters.

== Participating nations ==
A total of 75 athletes from seven nations are competing in bowling at the 2015 Southeast Asian Games:

- Indonesia (12)
- Malaysia (12)
- Myanmar (6)
- Philippines (12)
- Singapore (12)
- Thailand (12)
- Vietnam (9)

== Competition schedule ==
The following is the competition schedule for the bowling competitions:

P	Preliminaries	F	Final

Event↓/Date →	Tue 9	Wed 10	Thu 11	Fri 12	Sat 13	Sun 14
Men's singles	F					
Women's singles	F					
Men's doubles		F				
Women's doubles		F				
Men's trios			F			
Women's trios			F			
Men's team of 5				F		
Women's team of 5				F		
Men's masters					P	F
Women's masters					P	F

== Medal table ==
* Host nation (Singapore)

Rank	Nation	Gold	Silver	Bronze	Total
1	Malaysia	5	1	4	10
2	Singapore*	4	5	1	10
3	Thailand	1	1	1	3
4	Indonesia	0	3	2	5
5	Philippines	0	0	2	2
Totals (5 entries)		10	10	10	30

== Medalists ==
=== Men ===
Event	Gold		Silver		Bronze	
Singles	Muhamad Rafiq Ismail; Malaysia	1308	Annop Arromsaranon; Thailand	1305	Javier Tan; Singapore	1284
Doubles	Singapore; Howard Saw; Keith Saw	2653	Indonesia; Ryan Leonard Lalisang; Billy Muhammad Islam	2628	Malaysia; Johnathan Chan; Timmy Tan	2574
Trios	Malaysia; Muhamad Rafiq Ismail; Ahmad Muaz Fishol; Timmy Tan	3701	Singapore; Javier Tan; Howard Saw; Keith Saw	3656	Indonesia; Ryan Leonard Lalisang; Billy Muhammad Islam; Hardy Rachmadian	3653
Team of 5	Malaysia; Muhamad Rafiq Ismail; Adrian Ang; Alex Liew; Timmy Tan; Ahmad Muaz Fishol; Johnathan Chan	6238	Indonesia; Billy Muhammad Islam; Diwan Syahril; Adhiguna Widiantoro; Ryan Leonard Lalisang; Hardy Rachmadian; Ramadona Yeri	6066	Thailand; Phumin Klanbida; Annop Arromsaranon; Surasak Manuwong; Atchariya Cheng; Yannaphon Larpapharat; Kim Bolleby	5852
Masters	Yannaphon Larpapharat; Thailand	414	Muhamad Rafiq Ismail; Malaysia	381	Adrian Ang; Malaysia	245 ^{[a]}

Note:
^{a} Score for 2nd/3rd place.

=== Women ===
Event	Gold		Silver		Bronze	
Singles	Daphne Tan; Singapore	1368	Jazreel Tan; Singapore	1313	Esther Cheah ^{[b]} Malaysia	1291
Doubles	Malaysia; Jane Sin; Esther Cheah	3963	Indonesia; Sharon Limansantoso; Tannya Roumimper	2545	Malaysia; Syaidatul Afifah; Shalin Zulkifli	2524
Trios	Singapore; Cherie Tan; Bernice Lim; Shayna Ng	3963	Singapore; Daphne Tan; New Hui Fen; Jazreel Tan	3707	Philippines; Marie Alexis Sy; Maria Arles; Lara Posadas	3608
Team of 5	Malaysia; Shalin Zulkifli; Natasha Roslan; Syaidatul Afifah; Esther Cheah; Jane Sin; Siti Safiyah Amirah	6067	Singapore; Cherie Tan; Daphne Tan; Jazreel Tan; New Hui Fen; Shayna Ng; Bernice Lim	6012	Philippines; Liza Del Rosario; Marie Alexis Sy; Krizziah Tabora; Lara Posadas; Liza Clutario; Maria Arles	5776
Masters	Jazreel Tan; Singapore	516	Daphne Tan; Singapore	353	Tannya Roumimper ^{[c]} Indonesia	-

Note:
^{b} Cherie Tan of Singapore finished in third place, however, the bronze medal was awarded to Esther Cheah of Malaysia as no country is allowed to win all three medals on offer.
^{c} Shayna Ng of Singapore was ranked 2nd in qualification and qualified for stepladder finals, but was defeated by countrywoman Daphne Tan in the 2nd/3rd Place match. With Singapore bowlers finishing in top five positions in qualification, Tannya Roumimper of Indonesia, ranked 6th in qualification, was eventually awarded the bronze medal as no country is allowed to win all three medals on offer.
