= Waterskiing at the 2015 SEA Games =

- Venue: Bedok Reservoir
- Dates: 11 June 2015 to 14 June 2015
- Competitors: 39 from 5 nations

Waterskiing at the 2015 Southeast Asian Games will be held in Bedok Reservoir, Singapore from 11 to 14 June 2015.

== Participating nations ==
A total of 39 athletes from five nations competed in waterskiing at the 2015 Southeast Asian Games:

- Indonesia (11)
- Malaysia (8)
- Philippines (3)
- Singapore (9)
- Thailand (8)

== Medalists ==
=== Men ===
Event	Gold	Silver	Bronze
Tricks	Febrianto; Indonesia	Dimas Ridho Suprihono; Indonesia	Aiden Young Hanifah; Malaysia
Jump	Ade Hermana; Indonesia	Febrianto; Indonesia	Alex Yoong; Malaysia
Slalom	Mark Leong Kok Loong; Singapore	Indra Hardinata; Indonesia	Alex Yoong; Malaysia
WakeBoard	Padiwat Jaemjan; Thailand	Tatsanai Kuakoonrat; Thailand	Mark Howard Griffin; Philippines
Overall	Febrianto; Indonesia	Alex Yoong; Malaysia	Ade Hermana; Indonesia

=== Women ===
Event	Gold	Silver	Bronze
Tricks	Aaliyah Yoong Hanifah; Malaysia	Nur Alimah Priambodo; Indonesia	Sabelle Ashley Jen Kee; Singapore
Jump	Rossi Amir; Indonesia	Aaliyah Yoong Hanifah; Malaysia	Nur Alimah Priambodo; Indonesia
Slalom	Sasha Siew Hoon Christian; Singapore	Ummu Thoyibhatus Sholikah; Indonesia	Kalya Marisa Kee Lin; Singapore
WakeBoard	Sasha Siew Hoon Christian; Singapore	Galuh Mutiara Maulidina; Indonesia	Maiquel Jawn Selga; Philippines
Overall	Aaliyah Yoong Hanifah; Malaysia	Nur Alimah Priambodo; Indonesia	Kalya Marisa Kee Lin; Singapore

=== Mixed ===
Event	Gold	Silver	Bronze
WakeBoard Team	Thailand; Padiwat Jaemjan; Tatsanai Kuakoonrat; Pattanan Pamonpol; Saitip Lara Rotrakarn; Panyapa Tangsirirat	Singapore; Sasha Siew Hoon Christian; Samuel Min You Chua; Jia Yi Gooi; Sim Hwee Ng; Melanie Jane Bee Yen Tan; Joshua Li Min Tay	Philippines; Mark Howard Griffin; Angelo Louise Linao; Maiquel Jawn Selga

== Medal table ==
* Host nation (Singapore)

Rank	Nation	Gold	Silver	Bronze	Total
1	Indonesia	4	7	2	13
2	Singapore*	3	1	3	7
3	Malaysia	2	2	3	7
4	Thailand	2	1	0	3
5	Philippines	0	0	3	3
Totals (5 entries)		11	11	11	33
