= Cambodia national rugby sevens team =

Cambodia
- Union: Cambodian Federation of Rugby
- Nickname: Koupreys

The Cambodia national rugby sevens team is a minor national sevens side.

== 2007 Singer Sri Lankan Airlines Rugby 7s ==
=== First round ===
Key to colours in group tables
Teams advanced to the Cup quarter-final
Teams advanced to the Plate semi-final
Teams advanced to the Bowl final

=== Pool A ===
- South Korea 33–10 Sri Lanka
- Kazakhstan 45–19 Cambodia
- South Korea 36–5 Thailand
- Thailand 45–0 Cambodia
- South Korea 47–12 Kazakhstan
- Sri Lanka 28–12 Kazakhstan
- South Korea 55–0 Cambodia
- Thailand 17–17 Kazakhstan
- Sri Lanka 47–0 Cambodia
- Sri Lanka Won–Lost Thailand

Teams	Pld	W	D	L	PF	PA	+/−	Pts
South Korea	4	4	0	0	171	27	+144	12
Sri Lanka	4	3	0	1	?	?	?	10
Thailand	4	1	1	2	?	?	?	7
Kazakhstan	4	1	1	2	86	111	−25	7
Cambodia	4	0	0	4	19	192	−173	4

=== Bowl ===
Final
India	36
Cambodia	5

== See also ==
- Rugby union in Cambodia
