= Field hockey at the 2015 SEA Games =

- Venue: Sengkang Hockey Stadium
- Dates: 6–13 June 2015
- Competitors: 144 from 5 nations

Field hockey at the 2015 SEA Games was held in Sengkang Hockey Stadium, Singapore from 6 to 13 June 2015. Medals were awarded in one discipline for both men and women competitions.

== Participating nations ==
A total of 144 athletes from five nations will be competing in field hockey at the 2015 SEA Games:

- Indonesia (18)
- Malaysia (36)
- Myanmar (18)
- Singapore (36)
- Thailand (36)

== Competition schedule ==
The following is the competition schedule for the field hockey competitions:

P	Preliminaries	B	3rd place play-off	F	Final

Event↓/Date →	Sat 6	Sun 7	Mon 8	Tue 9	Wed 10	Thu 11	Fri 12		Sat 13	
Men	P		P		P				B	F
Women	P	P		P			B	F		

== Medalists ==
Event	Gold	Silver	Bronze
Men's tournament	Malaysia (MAS); Adi Fazri Ab Rahim; Ashran Hamsani; Husaini Mohd Husin; Omar Firdaus; Nor Azrul Abdul Rahman; Najib Abu Hassan; Airman Nik Rozemi; Azwar Abdul Rahman; Sufi Ismat Rohul; Abdul Khaliq Hamirin; Norsyafiq Sumantri; Amirol Aideed; Rafizul Ezry Mustafa; Syafiq Syed; Mazhans Christi; Aminudin Mohd Zain; Najmi Farizal Jazlan; Ridzwan Azmi	Singapore (SIN); Suresh A. Nur Iszuan Adon; Haseef Salim; Farhan Kamsani; Enrico Marican; Jaspal Singh; Karleef Abdullah; Mohd Saifulnizam; Nur Ashriq Zulkepli; Silas Noor; Timothy Goh; Ishwarpal Singh; Johnson Sivalingam; Baqir Asali; Tan Yi Ru; Sabri Yuhari; Muhd Faris; Abdul Hafiz	Myanmar (MYA); Kyaw Soe Hling; Soe Lin Aung; Thura Kyaw; Zar Ni; Thant Zin Oo; Hein Min Zaw; Than Htut Win; Thein Htike Oo; Thet Htwe; Thein Htike Aung; Tun Tun Win; Ko Wai; Nyein Chan Aung; Thet Paing Tun; Aye Myint Ko; Kyaw Kyaw Khing; Sit Nyein Aye; Aung Myo Thu
Women's tournament	Malaysia (MAS); Farah A. Yahya; Nurul N. Mansur; Noor H. Md Ali; Raja Shabuddin; Siti Noor Ruhani; Juliani Mohamad Din; Norbaini Hashim; Siti Shahida Saad; Hanis N. Onn; Noorain Mohd Arshad; Nurul Mat Isa; Siti Rahmah Othman; Fazilla Sylvester; Siti Noor Zainordin; Wan N. Md Saiuti; Rabiatul A. Mohamed; Surizan Awang Noh; Fatin Mahd Sukri	Thailand (THA); Jesdaporn Tongsun; Prapassorn Khuiklang; Salocha Losakul; Kanyanut Nakpolkrung; Sirikwan Wongkaew; Benjamas Bureewan; Tikhamporn Sakunpithak; Kanya Jantapet; Chantree Yungyuen; Yanisa Pimsan; Sukanya Ritngam; Boonta Duang-Urai; Supansa Samanso; Panadda Krumram; Anongnat Piresram; Kornkanok Sanpoung; Siraya Yimkrajang; Praphatsorn Khamsaeng	Singapore (SIN); Lam Xin Ni; Luo Ying Ying; Tam Wan Ting; Chen Yixin; Nursabrina Banuh; Tiffany Ong; Emily Chan; Ivy Chan; Chua Xinni; Rhys Wong; Ho Puay Ling; Joan Anne Lim; Syasya Rifqah Sanip; Toh Limin; Nur Syaheeza Jefri; Laura Tan; Eunice Teng; Felissa Lai

== Medal table ==
* Host nation (Singapore)

Rank	Nation	Gold	Silver	Bronze	Total
1	Malaysia (MAS)	2	0	0	2
2	Singapore (SIN)*	0	1	1	2
3	Thailand (THA)	0	1	0	1
4	Myanmar (MYA)	0	0	1	1
Totals (4 entries)		2	2	2	6

== Men's tournament ==
=== Preliminary round ===
Pos	Team	Pld	W	D	L	GF	GA	GD	Pts	Qualification
1	Malaysia	3	3	0	0	9	1	+8	9	Gold medal match
2	Singapore (H)	3	1	1	1	6	5	+1	4	Gold medal match
3	Myanmar	3	1	1	1	4	4	0	4	Bronze medal match
4	Thailand	3	0	0	3	1	10	−9	0	Bronze medal match

Source: FIH
(H) Hosts

6 June 2015
15:00

Malaysia	3–0	Thailand
	Report

6 June 2015
19:30

Singapore	1–1	Myanmar
	Report

8 June 2015
17:00

Thailand	1–3	Myanmar
	Report

8 June 2015
19:15

Singapore	1–4	Malaysia
	Report

10 June 2015
17:00

Malaysia	2–0	Myanmar
	Report

10 June 2015
19:15

Thailand	0–1	Singapore
	Report

=== Medal round ===
==== Bronze medal match ====
13 June 2015
16:00

Myanmar	5–1	Thailand
	Report

==== Gold medal match ====
12 June 2015
18:30

Malaysia	2–2	Singapore
	Report
Penalties
	4–3

=== Final standings ===
1. Malaysia
2. Singapore
3. Myanmar
4. Thailand

== Women's tournament ==
=== Preliminary round ===
Pos	Team	Pld	W	D	L	GF	GA	GD	Pts	Qualification
1	Malaysia	3	3	0	0	16	1	+15	9	Gold medal match
2	Thailand	3	2	0	1	10	4	+6	6	Gold medal match
3	Singapore (H)	3	1	0	2	1	8	−7	3	Bronze medal match
4	Indonesia	3	0	0	3	1	15	−14	0	Bronze medal match

Source: FIH
(H) Hosts

6 June 2015
15:30

Thailand	9–0	Indonesia
	Report

6 June 2015
17:15

Malaysia	7–0	Singapore
	Report

7 June 2015
17:00

Thailand	0–4	Malaysia
	Report

7 June 2015
19:15

Singapore	1–0	Indonesia
	Report

9 June 2015
17:00

Malaysia	5–1	Indonesia
	Report

9 June 2015
19:15

Singapore	0–1	Thailand
	Report

=== Medal round ===
==== Bronze medal match ====
12 June 2015
16:00

Singapore	1–0	Indonesia
	Report

==== Gold medal match ====
12 June 2015
18:30

Malaysia	3–1	Thailand
	Report

=== Final standings ===
1. Malaysia
2. Thailand
3. Singapore
4. Indonesia
