= Diving at the 2015 SEA Games =

- Venue: OCBC Aquatic Centre
- Dates: 6–9 June 2015
- Competitors: 46 from 7 nations

Diving at the 2015 SEA Games was held in OCBC Aquatic Centre, in Kallang, Singapore from 6 to 9 June 2015.

== Participating nations ==
A total of 46 athletes from seven nations competed in diving at the 2015 Southeast Asian Games:

Indonesia (8)
Malaysia (11)
Myanmar (4)
Philippines (4)
Singapore (8)
Thailand (4)
Vietnam (7)

== Competition schedule ==
The following is the competition schedule for the diving competitions:

P	Preliminaries	F	Final

Event↓/Date →	Sat 6		Sun 7		Mon 8		Tue 9	
Men's 3 metre springboard			P	F				
Men's 10 metre platform					P	F		
Men's synchronized 3 metre springboard							P	F
Men's synchronized 10 metre platform	P	F						
Women's 3 metre springboard	P	F						
Women's 10 metre platform							P	F
Women's synchronized 3 metre springboard					P	F		
Women's synchronized 10 metre platform			P	F				

== Medalists ==
=== Men ===
Event	Gold	Silver	Bronze
3 metre springboard	Ooi Tze Liang; Malaysia	Akhmad Sukran Jamjami; Indonesia	Mark Lee Han Ming; Singapore
10 metre platform	Ooi Tze Liang; Malaysia	Chew Yiwei; Malaysia	Jonathan Chan Fan Keng; Singapore
Synchronized 3 metre springboard	Malaysia (MAS); Ooi Tze Liang; Ahmad Amsyar Azman	Singapore (SIN); Timothy Lee Han Kuan; Mark Lee Han Ming	Indonesia (INA); Akhmad Sukran Jamjami; Adityo Restu Putra
Synchronized 10 metre platform	Malaysia (MAS); Ooi Tze Liang; Chew Yiwei	Indonesia (INA); Andriyan Andriyan; Adityo Restu Putra	Thailand (THA); Theerapat Siriboon; Yotsawat Juntaphadawon

=== Women ===
Event	Gold	Silver	Bronze
3 metre springboard	Cheong Jun Hoong; Malaysia	Ng Yan Yee; Malaysia	Fong Kay Yian; Singapore
10 metre platform	Pandelela Rinong Pamg; Malaysia	Loh Zhiayi; Malaysia	Freida Lim Shen-Yan; Singapore
Synchronized 3 metre springboard	Malaysia (MAS); Ng Yan Yee; Nur Dhabitah Sabri	Singapore (SIN); Fong Kay Yian; Ashlee Tan Yi Xuan	Vietnam (VIE); Hoàng Lê Thanh Thúy; Ngô Phương Mai
Synchronized 10 metre platform	Malaysia (MAS); Traisy Vivien Tukiet; Leong Mun Yee	Singapore (SIN); Myra Lee Jia Wen; Freida Lim Shen-Yan	Thailand (THA); Jiratchaya Yothongyos; Surincha Booranapol

== Medal table ==
* Host nation (Singapore)

Rank	Nation	Gold	Silver	Bronze	Total
1	Malaysia (MAS)	8	3	0	11
2	Singapore (SIN)*	0	3	4	7
3	Indonesia (INA)	0	2	1	3
4	Thailand (THA)	0	0	2	2
5	Vietnam (VIE)	0	0	1	1
Totals (5 entries)		8	8	8	24

== Events ==
=== Men's 3 metre springboard ===
Men's 3 metre springboard at the 2015 SEA Games
- Dates: 7 June 2015
- Competitors: 10 from 5 nations

Medalists
gold medal	Ooi Tze Liang	Malaysia
silver medal	Ahmad Sukran Jamjami	Indonesia
bronze medal	Lee Han Ming	Singapore

The men's 3 metre springboard competition was held on 7 June.

Date	Time	Round
7 June 2015	14:00	Finals

==== Final results ====
Rank	Athlete	Dive						Total
Rank	Athlete	1	2	3	4	5	6	Total
1st place, gold medalist(s)	Ooi Tze Liang (MAS)	71.30	79.20	75.25	81.60	84.60	81.60	473.55
2nd place, silver medalist(s)	Ahmad Sukran Jamjami (INA)	65.10	66.00	63.00	57.00	58.50	71.40	381.00
3rd place, bronze medalist(s)	Lee Han Ming (SIN)	58.50	34.50	60.00	63.55	63.00	69.70	349.25
4	Lee Han Kuan (SIN)	67.50	62.00	64.50	67.50	27.00	58.80	347.30
5	Adityo Restu Putra (INA)	49.60	68.00	51.00	48.00	67.50	54.40	338.50
6	Muhammad Syafiq Puteh (MAS)	63.00	54.60	60.90	64.50	42.00	51.15	336.15
7	John Elmerson Fabriga (PHI)	43.20	52.70	48.00	0.00	57.60	36.00	236.90
8	John David Pahoyo (PHI)	33.60	35.60	54.00	0.00	43.50	49.50	216.25

=== Men's 10 metre platform ===
The men's 10 metre platform competition was held on 8 June.

Date	Time	Round
8 June 2015	15:30	Preliminaries
8 June 2015	15:30	Finals

=== Men's synchronized 3 metre springboard ===
The men's synchronized 3 metre springboard competition was held on 9 June.

Date	Time	Round
9 June 2015	14:00	Preliminaries
9 June 2015	14:00	Finals

=== Men's synchronized 10 metre platform ===
Men's synchronized 10 metre platform at the 2015 SEA Games
- Dates: 6 June 2015
- Competitors: 8 from 4 nations

Medalists
gold medal	Ooi Tze Liang; Chew Yi Wei	Malaysia
silver medal	Andriyan Andriyan; Adityo Restu Putra	Indonesia
bronze medal	Theerapat Siriboon; Yotsawat Juntaphadawon	Thailand

The men's synchronized 10 metre platform competition was held on 6 June.

Date	Time	Round
6 June 2015	15:30	Finals

==== Results ====
Rank	Team	Dive						Total
Rank	Team	1	2	3	4	5	6	Total
1st place, gold medalist(s)	Malaysia (MAS); Ooi Tze Liang; Chew Yiwei	52.20	50.40	73.80	72.96	78.21	76.80	404.37
2nd place, silver medalist(s)	Indonesia (INA); Andriyan Andriyan; Adityo Restu Putra	46.20	42.60	67.50	64.32	68.16	66.33	355.11
3rd place, bronze medalist(s)	Thailand (THA); Theerapat Siriboon; Yotsawat Juntaphadawon	43.80	46.20	54.72	50.40	58.29	63.36	316.77
4	Myanmar (MYA); Oo Zwe Thet; Htet Zaw Myo	42.00	43.80	57.96	46.80	47.85	56.02	284.43

=== Women's 3 metre springboard ===
Women's 3 metre springboard at the 2015 SEA Games
- Dates: 6 June 2015
- Competitors: 10 from 5 nations

Medalists
gold medal	Cheong Jun Hoong	Malaysia
silver medal	Ng Yan Yee	Malaysia
bronze medal	Fong Kay Yian	Singapore

The women's 3 metre springboard competition was held on 6 June.

Date	Time	Round
6 June 2015	14:00	Final

==== Results ====
Rank	Athlete	Dive					Total
Rank	Athlete	1	2	3	4	5	Total
1st place, gold medalist(s)	Cheong Jun Hoong (MAS)	72.00	67.50	69.00	67.20	73.95	349.65
2nd place, silver medalist(s)	Ng Yan Yee (MAS)	63.00	52.70	66.00	63.00	64.50	309.20
3rd place, bronze medalist(s)	Fong Kay Yian (SIN)	46.80	57.40	47.60	56.70	50.40	258.90
4	Linadini Yasmin (INA)	36.00	44.40	52.65	44.80	44.80	222.65
5	Myra Lee Jia Wen (SIN)	46.80	32.40	40.60	50.40	40.80	211.00
6	Eka Purnama Indah (INA)	54.00	37.20	63.00	0.00	36.00	190.20
7	Hoang Le Thanh Thuy (VIE)	43.20	46.20	29.40	24.30	44.40	187.50

=== Women's 10 metre platform ===
Women's 10 metre platform at the 2015 SEA Games
- Dates: 9 June 2015
- Competitors: 11 from 6 nations

The women's 10 metre platform competition was held on 9 June.

Date	Time	Round
9 June 2015	15:30	Preliminaries
9 June 2015	15:30	Finals

==== Results ====
Rank	Diver	Nationality	Preliminary		Final	
Rank	Diver	Nationality	Points	Rank	Points	Rank
1st place, gold medalist(s)	PAMG Pandelela Rinong	Malaysia			353.00	1
2nd place, silver medalist(s)	LOH Zhiayi	Malaysia			305.25	2
3rd place, bronze medalist(s)	LIM Shen-Yan Freida	Singapore			251.70	3
4	CHAN Wan Lin Kimberly	Singapore			241.35	4
5	LATT Nay Chi Su Su	Myanmar			196.35	5
6	NGUYEN Vu Thao Quynh	Vietnam			189.90	6
7	YASMIN Linadini	Indonesia			183.60	7
8	NGUYEN Phuong Anh	Vietnam			173.20	8
9	NANDAR Saw Hla	Myanmar			169.10	9
10	ABIERA Hazel Bernadette	Philippines			160.05	10
11	DOMENIOS Riza Jane	Philippines			159.75	11

=== Women's synchronized 3 metre springboard ===
The women's synchronized 3 metre springboard was held on 8 June.

Date	Time	Round
8 June 2015	14:00	Preliminaries
8 June 2015	14:00	Finals

=== Women's synchronized 10 metre platform ===
The women's synchronized 10 metre platform competition was held on 7 June.

Date	Time	Round
7 June 2015	15:30	Preliminaries
7 June 2015	15:30	Finals
