= Rugby sevens at the 2015 SEA Games =

Rugby Sevens at the 2015 SEA Games
- Venue: Choa Chu Kang Stadium
- Dates: 6–7 June 2015
- Competitors: 131 from 6 nations

Rugby sevens at the 2015 Southeast Asian Games was held in Choa Chu Kang Stadium, Singapore from 6 to 7 June 2015. It marked the first time the sport have been part of the SEA Games due to the sport making its debut at the 2016 Rio de Janeiro Olympics.

== Participating nations ==
A total of 131 athletes from six nations competed in rugby sevens at the 2015 Southeast Asian Games:

- Cambodia (12)
- Laos (23)
- Malaysia (24)
- Philippines (24)
- Singapore (24)
- Thailand (24)

== Competition schedule ==
The following is the competition schedule for the rugby sevens competitions:

P	Preliminaries	B	3rd place play-off	F	Final

Event↓/Date →	Sat 6	Sun 7		
Men	P	P	B	F
Women	P	P	B	F

== Medalists ==
Event	Gold	Silver	Bronze
Men's tournament	Philippines (PHI); Andrew Wolff; Benjamin Joshua Saunders; Gareth Holgate; Jake Gerald Letts; Alexander Vincent Aronson; Christopher Hitch; Matthew Donato Saunders; Vincent Francis Young; Harry Morris; Justin Coveney; Andrew Everingham; Patrice David Louis Olivier	Malaysia (MAS); Wan Izzudin Ismail; Mohamad Safwan Abdullah; Muhammad Hakim Abu Hasan; Muhammad Faridzal Ismail; Muhammad Ameer Zulkeffli; Badrul Muktee; Zulkiflee Azmi; Mohd Azmir Zanul Abdin; Anwarul Hafiz Ahmad; Mohd Fairuz Ab Rahman; Muhammad Zainudin; Mohamad Nur Azri Azmi	Singapore (SIN); Wei Liang Blandon Tan; Junhao Jonathan Lee; Yi Shu Ho; Kwok-Ho Daniel Marc Chow; Muhammad Zaki Mahmood; Hua Jie Derek Chan; Chung Jin Bryan Ng; Marah Moeham. Max Gerard Ducourneau; He Teng Samuel Teo; Naresh Kunasegaran; Yu Hong Nicholas Yau
Women's tournament	Thailand (THA); Naritsara Worakitsirikun; Jutamas Butket; Thanachporn Wandee; Jeeraporn Peerabunanon; Rattanaporn Wittayaronnayut; Piyamat Chomphumee; Chitchanok Yusri; Rasamee Sisongkham; Uthumporn Liamrat; Butsaya Bunrak; Tidarat Sawatnam; Nuengruethai Jaemit	Singapore (SIN); Yu Xiu Alvinia Ow Yong; Yini Chua; Samantha Ming Li Teo; Jialing Derelyn Chua; Angelina Huiyun Liu; Jia Yu Chan; Siok Feng Jeslyn Lim; Christabelle Mee Lim; Chloe Jacelyne Besanger; Yilin Wong; Yi Tian Lee; Li Yan Lim	Philippines (PHI); Angella Camille San Juan; Helena Roxanne Indigne; Gelanie Gamba; Kaye Llanie Honoras; Madille Salinas; Rassiel Sales; Ada Milby; Dixie Star Yu; Sylvia Tudoc; Aiumi Ono; Anna Beatrix Pacis; Rosemarie Dela Cruz

== Medal table ==
* Host nation (Singapore)

Rank	Nation	Gold	Silver	Bronze	Total
1	Philippines (PHI)	1	0	1	2
2	Thailand (THA)	1	0	0	1
3	Singapore (SIN)*	0	1	1	2
4	Malaysia (MAS)	0	1	0	1
Totals (4 entries)		2	2	2	6
