= Singapore at the 2015 SEA Games =

Singapore at the 2015 Southeast Asian Games
- IOC code: SIN
- NOC: Singapore National Olympic Council
- Website: www.singaporeolympics.com (in English)

in Singapore
- Competitors: 771 in 36 sports
- Flag bearer: Quah Ting Wen (Swimming)
- Officials: 342
- Medals Ranked 2nd: Gold 84 Silver 73 Bronze 102 Total 259

Southeast Asian Games appearances (overview)
- 1959; 1961; 1965; 1967; 1969; 1971; 1973; 1975; 1977; 1979; 1981; 1983; 1985; 1987; 1989; 1991; 1993; 1995; 1997; 1999; 2001; 2003; 2005; 2007; 2009; 2011; 2013; 2015; 2017; 2019; 2021; 2023; 2025; 2027; 2029

Singapore hosted the 2015 Southeast Asian Games from 5 to 16 June 2015.

== Competitors ==
A total of 749 athletes competed in all 36 sports during the games.

Source: Summary of breakdown of athletes by sport

Sport	Men	Women	Total
Diving	3	5	8
Swimming	13	16	29
Synchronised swimming	0	12	12
Water polo	13	13	26
Archery	8	8	16
Athletics	41	32	73
Badminton	10	10	20
Basketball	12	12	24
Billiards and snooker	9	2	11
Bowling	6	6	12
Boxing	6	4	10
Canoeing	12	7	19
Cycling	6	2	8
Equestrian	1	7	8
Fencing	12	12	24
Field hockey	18	18	36
Floorball	20	20	40
Football	20	0	20
Golf	4	3	7
Gymnastics–Artistic	6	6	12
Gymnastics–Rhythmic	0	8	8
Judo	6	4	10
Netball	0	12	12
Pencak silat	9	5	14
Pétanque	4	5	9
Rowing	18	8	26
Rugby sevens	12	12	24
Sailing	16	16	32
Sepak takraw	19	0	19
Shooting	18	11	29
Softball	17	17	34
Squash	4	4	8
Table tennis	5	5	10
Taekwondo	4	4	8
Tennis	5	4	9
Traditional boat race	14	14	28
Triathlon	2	2	4
Volleyball	12	12	24
Waterskiing	4	5	9
Wushu	11	6	17
Others	-2	1	-1
Total	398	350	771

== Medal summary ==
=== Medal by sport ===
Medals by sport
Sport	1st place, gold medalist(s)	2nd place, silver medalist(s)	3rd place, bronze medalist(s)	Total
Diving	0	3	4	7
Swimming	23	12	7	42
Synchronised swimming	2	1	0	3
Water polo	1	1	0	2
Archery	0	0	2	2
Athletics	3	3	3	9
Badminton	0	0	4	4
Basketball	0	0	1	1
Billiards and snooker	2	1	3	6
Bowling	4	5	1	10
Boxing	0	2	4	6
Canoeing	7	5	0	12
Cycling	0	0	2	2
Equestrian	1	3	0	4
Fencing	3	3	7	13
Floorball	2	0	0	2
Golf	0	2	2	4
Gymnastics	1	3	4	8
Field hockey	0	1	1	2
Judo	0	2	4	6
Netball	1	0	0	1
Pencak silat	1	1	6	8
Rowing	0	1	3	4
Rugby sevens	0	1	1	2
Sailing	10	7	1	18
Sepak takraw	0	1	7	8
Shooting	5	9	7	21
Softball	0	0	2	2
Squash	1	1	4	6
Table tennis	6	1	3	10
Taekwondo	2	0	6	8
Traditional boat race	0	0	5	5
Triathlon	0	0	1	1
Volleyball	0	0	1	1
Waterskiing	3	1	3	7
Wushu	6	3	3	12
Total	84	73	102	259

=== Medal by date ===
Medals by date
Day	Date	1st place, gold medalist(s)	2nd place, silver medalist(s)	3rd place, bronze medalist(s)	Total
–3	2 June	2	1	1	4
–2	3 June	3	2	2	7
–1	4 June	2	1	4	7
0	5 June	0	0	0	0
1	6 June	10	7	10	27
2	7 June	9	9	20	38
3	8 June	15	7	10	32
4	9 June	11	17	6	34
5	10 June	8	7	10	25
6	11 June	6	7	7	20
7	12 June	4	5	13	22
8	13 June	4	2	11	17
9	14 June	8	7	4	19
10	15 June	1	1	4	6
11	16 June	1	0	0	1
Total		84	73	102	259

=== Multiple medalists ===
Multiple medalists with more than one gold medal:

Source: Multi Medalists

Name	Sport	Gold medal	Silver medal	Bronze medal	Total
Joseph Isaac Schooling	Swimming	9	0	0	9
Quah Zheng Wen	Swimming	7	4	1	12
Tao Li	Swimming	5	0	0	5
Quah Ting Wen	Swimming	4	4	0	8
Lim Xiang Qi	Swimming	4	0	0	4
Gao Ning	Table tennis	3	0	0	3
Stephenie Chen Jiexien	Canoeing	2	1	0	3
Chen Mei Qi Stephanie	Synchronised swimming	2	1	0	3
Sarah Chen Jiemei	Canoeing	2	1	0	3
Sasha Christian Siew Hoon	Waterskiing	2	1	0	3
Peter Edward Gilchrist	Billiards and snooker	2	1	0	3
Roanne Ho Ru'En	Swimming	2	1	0	3
Lee Mei Shuang	Synchronised swimming	2	1	0	3
Yap Yu Hui Crystal	Synchronised swimming	2	1	0	3
Yu Mengyu	Table tennis	2	1	0	3
Li Hu	Table tennis	2	0	1	3
Zhou Yihan	Table tennis	2	0	1	3
Chen Mei Qing Natalie	Synchronised swimming	2	0	0	2
Chew Wei Ling Geraldine	Synchronised swimming	2	0	0	2
Jovina Choo Bei Fen	Sailing	2	0	0	2
Gwyneth Goh Xiao Hui	Synchronised swimming	2	0	0	2
Terena Lam Peiyi	Sailing	2	0	0	2
Clement Lim Yong'En	Swimming	2	0	0	2
Lim Li Yi Shona	Synchronised swimming	2	0	0	2
Lin Ye	Table tennis	2	0	0	2
Dawn Liu Xiaodan	Sailing	2	0	0	2
Tessa Neo	Shooting	2	0	0	2
Daniella Ng Hui Min	Sailing	2	0	0	2
Soh Li Fei Debbie	Synchronised swimming	2	0	0	2
Tay Aik Fen	Synchronised swimming	2	0	0	2
Wang Wenying	Fencing	2	0	0	2
Yang Zi	Table tennis	2	0	0	2
Yeo Kai Quan	Swimming	2	0	0	2
Miya Yong Hsing	Synchronised swimming	2	0	0	2
Daphne Tan	Bowling	1	3	0	4
Jazreel Tan	Bowling	1	3	0	4
Ser Xiang Wei, Jasmine	Shooting	1	1	3	5
Pang Sheng Jun	Swimming	1	1	1	3
Teo Shun Xie	Shooting	1	1	1	3
Stanley Chan Hian Gee	Sailing	1	1	0	2
Colin Cheng Xinru	Sailing	1	1	0	2
Catherine Chew Yen Tu	Equestrian	1	1	0	2
Feng Tianwei	Table tennis	1	1	0	2
Lionel Khoo Chien Yin	Swimming	1	1	0	2
Anthony Kiong Lye Ming	Sailing	1	1	0	2
Jodie Lai Xuan Yi	Sailing	1	1	0	2
Lee Wei Liang Bill	Canoeing	1	1	0	2
Lee Wei Ling Geraldine	Canoeing	1	1	0	2
Bernice Lim	Bowling	1	1	0	2
Mui Wei Ting Zoe	Wushu	1	1	0	2
Annabelle Ng Xiang Ru	Canoeing	1	1	0	2
Coling Ng Wee Tai	Sailing	1	1	0	2
Shayna Ng	Bowling	1	1	0	2
Brandon Ooi Wei Cheng	Canoeing	1	1	0	2
Marcus Phua Jia Hui	Squash	1	1	0	2
Vivian Rhamanan	Squash	1	1	0	2
Howard Saw	Bowling	1	1	0	2
Keith Saw	Bowling	1	1	0	2
Suzanne Seah	Canoeing	1	1	0	2
Soh Sze Ying	Canoeing	1	1	0	2
Cherie Tan	Bowling	1	1	0	2
Mervyn Toh Yingjie	Canoeing	1	1	0	2
Chew Zhe Yu Clarence	Table tennis	1	0	2	3
Mohd Zain Amat	Shooting	1	0	1	2
Kevin Jerrold Chan	Fencing	1	0	1	2
Chelsea Sim	Taekwondo	1	0	1	2
Chen Feng	Table tennis	1	0	1	2
Gai Bin	Shooting	1	0	1	2
Kang Rui Jie	Taekwondo	1	0	1	2
Lim Swee Hon	Shooting	1	0	1	2
Veronica Shanti Pereira	Athletics	1	0	1	2
Poh Lip Meng	Shooting	1	0	1	2
Yong Yi Xiang	Wushu	1	0	1	2
