= Malaysia at the 2015 SEA Games =

Malaysia at the 2015 Southeast Asian Games
- IOC code: MAS
- NOC: Olympic Council of Malaysia
- Website: www.olympic.org.my (in English)

in Singapore
- Competitors: 641 in 35 sports
- Flag bearer: Leong Mun Yee (diving)
- Officials: 268
- Medals Ranked 4th: Gold 62 Silver 58 Bronze 66 Total 186

Southeast Asian Games appearances (overview)
- 1959; 1961; 1965; 1967; 1969; 1971; 1973; 1975; 1977; 1979; 1981; 1983; 1985; 1987; 1989; 1991; 1993; 1995; 1997; 1999; 2001; 2003; 2005; 2007; 2009; 2011; 2013; 2015; 2017; 2019; 2021; 2023; 2025; 2027; 2029

Malaysia participated in the 2015 Southeast Asian Games in Singapore from 5 to 16 June 2015.

== Competitors ==
The Malaysian contingent was represented by 659 athletes consisting of 356 men and 303 women. The contingent's feat of collecting 62 gold medals has exceeded the 48 gold medal targets set by the National Sports Council.

Sport	Men	Women	Total
Diving	4	7	11
Swimming	9	8	17
Synchronised swimming	-	9	9
Water polo	13	13	26
Archery	8	8	16
Athletics	28	20	48
Badminton	10	10	20
Basketball	12	12	24
Billiards and snooker	6	2	8
Bowling	6	6	12
Boxing	6	1	7
Canoeing	10	7	17
Cycling	6	2	8
Equestrian	4	3	7
Fencing	12	5	17
Field hockey	18	18	36
Floorball	20	18	38
Football	30	-	30
Golf	4	3	7
Gymnastics–Artistic	4	6	10
Gymnastics–Rhythmic	-	8	8
Judo	5	5	10
Netball	-	12	12
Pencak silat	10	6	16
Pétanque	7	6	13
Rowing	10	2	12
Rugby sevens	12	12	24
Sailing	15	16	31
Sepak takraw	18	5	23
Shooting	18	11	29
Softball	17	17	34
Squash	4	4	8
Table tennis	4	4	8
Taekwondo	6	4	10
Tennis	4	4	8
Triathlon	2	2	4
Volleyball	12	12	24
Waterskiing	5	3	8
Wushu	9	8	17
Others	-12	4	-8
Total	356	303	659

== Medal summary ==
=== Medal by sport ===
Medals by sport
Sport	1st place, gold medalist(s)	2nd place, silver medalist(s)	3rd place, bronze medalist(s)	Total	Rank
Diving	8	3	-	11	(1)
Swimming	3	4	4	11	3
Synchronised swimming	1	2	-	3	2
Water polo	-	-	-	-	4
Archery	5	3	2	10	(1)
Athletics	3	2	9	14	6
Badminton	2	4	2	8	2
Basketball	1	-	-	1	(1)
Billiards and snooker	2	-	-	2	3
Bowling	5	1	4	10	(1)
Boxing	-	-	-	-	10
Canoeing	-	-	-	-	7
Cycling	2	-	3	5	(1)
Equestrian	1	1	1	3	3
Fencing	-	-	2	2	6
Field hockey	2	-	-	2	(1)
Floorball	-	-	1	1	3
Football	-	-	-	-	4
Golf	-	-	-	-	4
Gymnastics–Artistic	3	3	3	9	2
Gymnastics–Rhythmic	2	1	-	3	(1)
Judo	-	-	5	5	8
Netball	-	1	-	1	2
Pencak silat	3	2	3	8	3
Petanque	1	3	1	5	2
Rowing	-	-	1	1	7
Rugby sevens	-	1	-	1	4
Sailing	7	5	2	14	2
Sepak takraw	1	2	2	5	3
Shooting	2	8	6	16	4
Softball	-	-	-	-	5
Squash	4	2	-	6	(1)
Table tennis	-	1	3	4	3
Taekwondo	-	3	3	6	5
Tennis	-	-	2	2	4
Triathlon	-	1	-	1	2
Volleyball	-	-	-	-	6
Waterskiing	2	2	3	7	3
Wushu	2	3	4	9	5
Total	62	58	66	186	8

=== Medal by date ===
Medals by date
Day	Date	1st place, gold medalist(s)	2nd place, silver medalist(s)	3rd place, bronze medalist(s)	Total
–3	2 June	-	-	1	1
–2	3 June	-	1	1	2
–1	4 June	1	2	-	3
0	5 June	-	-	-	-
1	6 June	2	4	9	15
2	7 June	5	9	4	18
3	8 June	7	3	8	18
4	9 June	6	7	8	21
5	10 June	6	5	7	18
6	11 June	5	2	5	12
7	12 June	6	7	7	20
8	13 June	7	3	9	19
9	14 June	14	10	6	30
10	15 June	1	2	1	4
11	16 June	2	3	-	5
Total		62	58	66	186

== Medallists ==
Medal	Name	Sport	Event	Date
Gold	Abdul Hadi Katrina Ann; Lee Yhing Huey	Synchronised swimming	Women's duet	4 June
Gold	Cheong Jun Hoong	Diving	Women's 3m springboard	6 June
Gold	Ooi Tze Liang; Chew Yiwei	Diving	Men's 10m synchronised platform	6 June
Gold	Ooi Tze Liang	Diving	Men's 3m springboard	7 June
Gold	Gymnasts: Ang Tracie Ang; Abdul Hadi Farah Ann; Tan Ing Yueh; Azmi Nur Eli Ellina; Ahmad Siti Nur Bahirah; Jayadev Lavinia Michelle	Gymnastics-Artistic	Women's team	7 June
Gold	Leong Mun Yee; Tukiet Traisy Vivien	Diving	Women's 10m synchronised platform	7 June
Gold	Sailers: Kaman Shah Muhammad Fauzi; Mansor Abdul Latif; Mohd Nazri Nor Nabila Natasha; Rose Ramlee Nur Aisah; Rozaini Muhammad Dhiauddin	Sailing	Team racing optimist (U16)	7 June
Gold	Wong Fu Kang	Swimming	Men's 100m breaststroke	7 June
Gold	Mat Daud Muhd Hafizuddin	Pétanque	Men's singles	8 June
Gold	Ng Yan Yee; Nur Dhabitah Sabri	Diving	Women's 3m synchronised springboard	8 June
Gold	Ooi Tze Liang	Diving	Men's 10m platform	8 June
Gold	Loh Jack Chang	Wushu	Men's taijiquan	8 June
Gold	Chan Audrey Yee Jo; Chan Lu Yi; Cheah Aggie Ruey Shin	Wushu	Women's barehand	8 June
Gold	Phee Jinq En	Swimming	Women's 100m breaststroke	8 June
Gold	Thor Chuan Leong	Billiards and snooker	Men's snooker singles	8 June
Gold	Ismail M. Rafiq	Bowling	Men's singles	9 June
Gold	Azman Ahmad Amsyar; Ooi Tze Liang	Diving	Men's 3m synchronised springboard	9 June
Gold	Tan Ing Yueh	Gymnastics-Artistic	Women's uneven bars	9 June
Gold	Pandelela Rinong	Diving	Women's 10m platform	9 June
Gold	Mohamad Latif Nur Shazrin	Sailing	Female youth Laser Radial (U19)	9 June
Gold	Ismail Muhammad Hakimi	Athletics	Men's triple jump	9 June
Gold	C. Ratnasingham Sharmini	Equestrian	Jumping individual	10 June
Gold	Cheah Esther; Sin Li Jane	Bowling	Women's doubles	10 June
Gold	Thor Chuan Leong	Billiards and snooker	Men's snooker doubles	10 June
Gold	Abdul Hadi Farah Ann	Gymnastics-Artistic	Women's floor	10 June
Gold	S. Chal Sanjay	Squash	Men's singles	10 June
Gold	M. Arnold Rachel	Squash	Women's singles	10 June
Gold	Azahari Alia Sazana	Shooting	Women's 25m pistol	11 June
Gold	Bowlers: Muaz Ahmad; Ismail M. Rafiq; Tan Timmy	Bowling	Men's trios	11 June
Gold	Shamshuddin Muhammad Irfan	Athletics	Men's discus throw	11 June
Gold	Randhawa Nauraj Singh	Athletics	Men's high jump	11 June
Gold	Sim Welson Wee Sheng	Swimming	Men's 400m freestyle	11 June
Gold	Abdul Halim Nur Ayuni Farhana	Shooting	Women's 50m rifle 3 positions	12 June
Gold	Saleh Mohd Harrif	Cycling	Men's criterium	12 June
Gold	Hanifah Yoong Aaliyah	Waterskiing	Women's tricks	12 June
Gold	Bowlers: Muaz Ahmad; Chan Johnathan; Liew Alex; Ismail M. Rafiq; Adrian Ang; Tan Timmy	Bowling	Men's teams of five	12 June
Gold	Players: A. Yahya Farah; N. Mansur Nurul; H. Md Ali Noor; Raja Shabuddin Raja; Ruhani Siti Noor; Mohamad Din Juliani; Hashim Norbaini; Saad Siti Shahida; N. Onn Hanis; Mohd Arshad Noorain; Mat Isa Nurul; Othman Siti Rahmah; Sylvester S. Fazilla; H. Zainordin Siti Noor; N. Md Saiuti Wan; A. Mohamed Rabiatul; Awang Noh Surizan; Mahd Sukri Fatin	Field hockey	Women	12 June
Gold	Bowlers: Cheah Esther; Sin Li Jane; Shalin Zulkifi; Amirah Siti Safiyah; Afifah Syaidatul; Roslan Natasha	Bowling	Women's teams of five	12 June
Gold	Archers: Joni Muhammad Ikram; Mohamad Khairul Anuar; Kamaruddin Haziq	Archery	Men's team recurve	13 June
Gold	Kaman Shah Muhammad Fauzi	Sailing	Male optimist (U16)	13 June
Gold	Jamil Nuraisyah; Mohamad Sayed Norashikin	Sailing	Female 470	13 June
Gold	Players: M. Arnold Rachel; Azan Zulhijjah; V. R. Gnanasigamani; Teh Min Jie	Squash	Women's team	13 June
Gold	Players: Mohd Nor Azmi Ahmad Aizat; Hamir Akhbar Mohd Khairol Zaman; Dolah Mohd Hanafiah; Adam Farhan; Mohd Rosdi Mohammad Syahir	Sepak takraw	Men's regu	13 June
Gold	Players: A. Bahtiar Muhd; B. J. Bong Valentino; Mohd Mudh Kamal; S. Chal Sanjay	Squash	Men's team	13 June
Gold	Players: Ab Rahim Adi Fazri; Hamsani Ashran; Mohd Husin Husaini; Firdaus Omar; Abdul Rahman Nor Azrul; Abu Hassan Najib; Nik Rozemi Aiman; Abdul Rahman Azwar; Rohul Sufi Ismat; Hamirin Abdul Khaliq; Sumantri Norsyafiq; Aideed Amirol; Mustafa Rafizul Ezry; Syed Syafiq; Christi Mazhans; Mohd Zain Aminudin; Jazlan Najmi Farizal; Azmi Ridzwan	Field hockey	Men	13 June
Gold	Archers: Ishak Nor Rizah; Mat Salleh Fatin Nurfatehah; Cham Nong Saritha	Archery	Women's team compound	14 June
Gold	M Nasir Muhammad Faizul	Pencak silat	Men's tanding class B (50-55kg)	14 June
Gold	Archers: Lee Kin Lip; Mazuki Mohd Juwaidi; Ruslan Zulfadhli	Archery	Men's team compound	14 June
Gold	Saleh Mohd Harrif	Cycling	Men's mass start road race	14 June
Gold	Mohd Yusof Muhamad Uzair Amin; Shahrin Naquib Eiman	Sailing	Male Youth 420 (U19)	14 June
Gold	Koi Sie Yan	Gymnastics-Rhythmic	Individual all-around	14 June
Gold	S. Nagarajan Shasangari	Gymnastics-Rhythmic	Individual all-around	14 June
Gold	Mat Salleh Fatin Nurfatehah; Mazuki Mohd Juwaidi	Archery	Mixed team compound	14 June
Gold	Mat Salleh Fatin Nurfatehah	Archery	Women's individual compound	14 June
Gold	Sailers: Ali Sabri Khan Ahmad Latif Khan; Hamid Muhammad Farhan; Mohd Afendy Kharulnizam	Sailing	Male team racing Laser standard	14 June
Gold	Hanifah Yoong Aaliyah	Waterskiing	Women's overall	14 June
Gold	Mohamed Nasir Siti Rahmah	Pencak silat	Women's tanding class D (60-65kg)	14 June
Gold	Jamari Mohd Al Jufferi	Pencak silat	Men's tanding class E (65-70kg)	14 June
Gold	Sailers: Mohamad Latif Nur Shazrin; Mohamad Latif Nurliyana; Mohd Afendy Khairunneeta	Sailing	Female Team Racing Laser Radial	14 June
Gold	Players: Pang Hui Pin; Chong Yin Yin; Saw Wei Yin; Rajintiran Kalaimathi; Yaakob Nur Izzati; Lee Jo Rynn; Ng Shi Yeng; Low Magdelene Phey Chyi; Yap Fook Yee; Ting Eugene Chiau Teng; Wong Mei Chyn; Choo Sook Ping	Basketball	Women	15 June
Gold	Anscelly Amelia Alicia; Soong Fie Cho	Badminton	Women's doubles	16 June
Gold	Chong Wei Feng	Badminton	Men's singles	16 June
Silver	Synchronised swimmers: Abdul Hadi Katrina Ann; Foong Yan Nie; Gan Hua Wei; Gan Zhen Yu; Kwong Zhi Kei; Lee Yhing Huey; Lee Yiat Lum; Taher Ali Tasha Jane; Lee Yiat Xin	Synchronised swimming	Women's team	3 June
Silver	Ng Sock Khim	Table tennis	Women's singles	4 June
Silver	Synchronised swimmers: Abdul Hadi Katrina Ann; Foong Yan Nie; Gan Hua Wei; Gan Zhen Yu; Kwong Zhi Kei; Lee Yhing Huey; Lee Yiat Lum; Taher Ali Tasha Jane; Lee Yiat Xin	Synchronised swimming	Women's free combination	4 June
Silver	Shooters: Abdul Halim Nur Ayuni Farhana; Mohamed Taibi Nur Suryani; Zulkifli Muslifah	Shooting	Women's 10m air rifle team	6 June
Silver	Shooters: Mohammad Muhammad Zubair; Jaafar Mohd Hadafi; Nasir Khan Muhammad Ezuan	Shooting	Men's 10m air rifle team	6 June
Silver	Ng Yan Yee	Diving	Women's 3m springboard	6 June
Silver	Chan Lu Yi	Wushu	Women's compulsory taijiquan	6 June
Silver	Shooters: Cheah Joseline Lee Yean; Ng Bibiana Pei Chin; Ismail Wahidah	Shooting	Women's 10m air pistol team	7 June
Silver	Shinozuka Rikigoro	Triathlon	Men's individual	7 June
Silver	Players: Abdul Razak Nurfariha; Abu Bakar Nurul Adha; Aziz Noor Azilah; Azizan An Najwa; Kamalzaman Norashikin; Mesnan Fazira; Mohd Ali Nur Syafazlyana; Mohd Wazir Izyan Syazana; Mustafa Siti Nor Farhana; Pow Mei Foong; Yap Suo Kuen; Noor Azhar Noramirah Dayana	Netball	Women	7 June
Silver	Loh Jack Chang	Wushu	Men's taijijian	7 June
Silver	Wong Johnathan Guanjie	Shooting	Men's 10m air pistol	7 June
Silver	Phoon Eyin	Wushu	Women's sword	7 June
Silver	Players: Ismail Wan Izzuddin; Abdullah Mohamad Safwan; Abu Hasan Muhammad Hakim; Ismail Muhammad Faridzal; Zulkeffli Muhammad Ameer; Muktee Badrul; Azmi Zulkiflee; Zainul Abdin Mohd Azmir; Ahmad Anwarul Hafiz; Ab Rahman Mohd Fairuz; Muhamad Zainudin Muhammad; Azmi Mohamad Nur Azri	Rugby sevens	Men	7 June
Silver	Players: Azmi Mohammad Kamal; Mohammad Arif; Mohd Nadzi Mohd Nazuha; Alias Mohamad Azlan; Amir Amirul Zazwan; Che Bongsu Ab Muhaimi; Mohd Asri Mohamad Fazil Mohd Asri; Razali Muhammad Zaim	Sepak takraw	Chinlone – non-repetition primary	7 June
Silver	Swimmers: Henry Bego Daniel William; Sim Welson Wee Sheng; Yeap Kevin Soon Choy; Lim Ching Hwang	Swimming	Men's 4 × 200 m freestyle relay	7 June
Silver	Equines: Amir Hamzah Ahmad Imtaz; Ismail Mohammad Nabil Fikri; C. Ratnasingham Sharmini; Wah Idris Natasha Ines	Equestrian	Jumping team	8 June
Silver	Chew Yiwei	Diving	Men's 10m platform	8 June
Silver	Abdul Hadi Farah Ann	Gymnastics-Artistic	Women's individual all-around	8 June
Silver	Shooters: Abdul Halim Nur Ayuni Farhana; Mohamed Taibi Nur Suryani; Zulkifli Muslifah	Shooting	Women's 50m rifle prone Team	9 June
Silver	Tan Ing Yueh	Gymnastics-Artistic	Women's vault	9 June
Silver	Loh Zhiayi	Diving	Women's 10m platform	9 June
Silver	Mohd Afendy Khairulnizam	Sailing	Male Laser standard	9 June
Silver	Sailers: Anuar Nurul Elia; Geh Cheow Lin; Hamid Nur Amirah; Sallahuddin Umi Norwahida	Sailing	Female Fleet Racing Keelboat	9 June
Silver	Players: Mohd Nor Azmi Ahmad Aizat; Abu Bakar Mohd Safarudin; Alias Mohamad Azlan; Hamir Akhbar Mohd Khairol Zaman; Mohd Dahan Mohd Zamree; Mohd Najib Muhamad Nazmi Mohd Najib; Dolah Mohd Hanafiah; Adam Farhan; Haidzir Muhammad Hairul Hazizi; Sumari Zuleffendi; Mohd Rosdi Mohammad Syahir; Razali Muhammad Zaim	Sepak takraw	Men's team	9 June
Silver	Swimmers: Tan Yean Yang Alwyn; Sim Welson Wee Sheng; Lim Ching Hwang; Henry Bego Daniel William	Swimming	Men's 4 × 100 m freestyle relay	9 June
Silver	Loo Jeremiah Phay Xing	Gymnastics-Artistic	Men's Horizontal Bar	10 June
Silver	A. Bahtiar Muhd	Squash	Men's singles	10 June
Silver	V. R. Gnanasigamani	Squash	Women's singles	10 June
Silver	Phee Jinq En	Swimming	Women's 50m breaststroke	10 June
Silver	Khoo Cai Lin	Swimming	Women's 400m freestyle	10 June
Silver	Musmin Saiful Bahri; Temizi Mohamad Nuzul Azwan	Pétanque	Men's doubles	11 June
Silver	Wan Sofian Rayzam Shah	Athletics	Men's 110m hurdles	11 June
Silver	Shooters: Abdul Halim Nur Ayuni Farhana; Mohamed Taibi Nur Suryani; Zulkifli Muslifah	Shooting	Women's 50m rifle 3 positions Team	12 June
Silver	Kok Jun Ee; Yap Khim Wen	Taekwondo	Mixed Pair Poomsae	12 June
Silver	Shooters: Ng Beng Chong; Chen Seong Fook; Yeoh Bernard Cheng Han	Shooting	Men's trap team	12 June
Silver	Players: Anscelly Amelia Alicia; Goh Jin Wei; Goh Liu Ying; Ho Yen Mei; Hoo Vivian Kah Mun; Lai Pei Jing; Lim Yin Fun; Soong Fie Cho; Tee Jing Yi; Woon Khe Wei	Badminton	Women's team	12 June
Silver	Chen Seong Fook	Shooting	Men's trap	12 June
Silver	Yap Jeng Tzan	Athletics	Women's discus throw	12 June
Silver	Azri Salman	Taekwondo	Men's under 54kg	12 June
Silver	Hanifah Yoong Aaliyah	Waterskiing	Women's jump	13 June
Silver	Mohamad Khairul Anuar; Loke Shin Hui	Archery	Mixed team recurve	13 June
Silver	Kamaruddin Haziq	Archery	Men's individual recurve	13 June
Silver	Tan Rufina Hong Mui; Tsen Connie Riverra	Sailing	Female Skiff 49erFX	14 June
Silver	Mohd Nazri Nor Adriana Adlyna; Norulakhairi Siti Nur Fatihah	Sailing	Female youth 420 (U19)	14 June
Silver	Romli Muhammad Fahmi	Pencak silat	Men's tanding class D (60-65kg)	14 June
Silver	Ruslan Zulfadhli	Archery	Men's individual compound	14 June
Silver	Gymnasts: Chai Xin Nong; Chan Mei Thung; Loo Shiow Yng; Thew Yue Jia; Yap Qian Ling; Yap Sin Lu	Gymnastics-Rhythmic	Group All-Around	14 June
Silver	Ismail M. Rafiq	Bowling	Men's masters	14 June
Silver	Sailers: Anuar Nurul Elia; Geh Cheow Lin; Hamid Nur Amirah; Sallahuddin Umi Norwahida	Sailing	Female Match Racing Keelboat	14 June
Silver	Yoong Loong Alexander Charles	Waterskiing	Men's overall	14 June
Silver	Mohd Sulaiman Khir Amir	Taekwondo	Men's under 74kg	14 June
Silver	Sobri Muhammad Robial	Pencak silat	Men's tanding class H (80-85kg)	14 June
Silver	Lawn Bowlers: Mahmad Saberi Mohammad Hakem; Mat Daud Muhd Hafizuddin; Musmin Saiful Bahri; Syed Ali Syed Akmal Fikri	Pétanque	Men's triples	15 June
Silver	Lawn Bowlers: Abdul Aziz Nur Thahira Tasnim; Abu talib Siti Zubaidah; Johan Johnson Jasnina Jasmine; Zamri Suhartisera	Pétanque	Women's triples	15 June
Silver	Hoo Vivian Kah Mun; Woon Khe Wei	Badminton	Women's doubles	16 June
Silver	Ab Latif Mohamad Arif	Badminton	Men's singles	16 June
Silver	Chan Peng Soon; Goh Liu Ying	Badminton	Mixed doubles	16 June
Bronze	Ho Ying; Lee Rou You	Table tennis	Women's doubles	2 June
Bronze	Yu Peng Kean	Fencing	Men's individual Sabre	3 June
Bronze	Equines: Mohamad Din Shaiful Azwan; Razali Mohd Izry; Wah Idris Natalya Aira	Equestrian	Dressage team	6 June
Bronze	Abdul Halim Nur Ayuni Farhana	Shooting	Women's 10m air rifle	6 June
Bronze	Players: Azmi Mohammad Kamal; Mohammad Arif; Mohd Nadzi Mohd Nazuha; Alias Mohamad Azlan; Amir Amirul Zazwan; Che Bongsu Ab Muhaimi; Mohd Asri Mohamad Fazil Mohd Asri; Razali Muhammad Zaim	Sepak takraw	Chinlone-Linking	6 June
Bronze	Temizi Mohamad Nuzul Azwan	Pétanque	Men's shooting	6 June
Bronze	Mohd Fikri Mohd Farhan Uzair	Judo	Men's -66kg	6 June
Bronze	Sim Welson Wee Sheng	Swimming	Men's 200m freestyle	6 June
Bronze	Chong Wei Fu	Judo	Men's 66-73kg	6 June
Bronze	Harun Muhammad Kharil Harith	Athletics	Men's 20 km Walk	6 June
Bronze	Fenciers: Lindbichler Adam Nicholas; Rizal Mohamad Shafiq; Wong Tzer Chyuan; Yu Peng Kean	Fencing	Men's team Sabre	6 June
Bronze	Chan Lu Yi	Wushu	Women's taijiquan	7 June
Bronze	Syed Salim Sarifah Fazila	Judo	Women's 70-78kg	7 June
Bronze	Cheah Aggie Ruey Shin	Wushu	Women's sword	7 June
Bronze	Mohamad Tahir Nor Izzatul Fazlia	Judo	Women's 63-70kg	7 June
Bronze	Ng Shin Yii	Wushu	Women's taijijian	8 June
Bronze	Players: Tang Angeline An Qi; Ho Ying; Lee Rou You; Ng Sock Khim	Table tennis	Women's team	8 June
Bronze	Shooters: Mohamed Siti Zawiyah; Mohd Fuad Norhidayah; Khoo Nee Hoe	Shooting	Women's precision pistol team	8 June
Bronze	Abd Razak Noor Asnida	Judo	Women's +78kg	8 June
Bronze	Players: Muhammad R. Muhammad A. H.; Ibrahim Muhd Shakirin; Wong Chun Cheun; Leong Chee Feng	Table tennis	Men's team	8 June
Bronze	Players: Deen Heshaam Ariez; Merzuki Mohd; Syed Naguib Syed; Zainal Abidin Muhammad	Tennis	Men's team	8 June
Bronze	Players: Noordin Jawairiah; Selva Rajoo Theiviya; Yusri Yus Syazlin	Tennis	Women's team	8 June
Bronze	Phoon Eyin	Wushu	Women's spear	8 June
Bronze	Wong Jackie Siew Cheer	Athletics	Men's hammer throw	9 June
Bronze	Wong Grace Xiu Mei	Athletics	Women's hammer throw	9 June
Bronze	Shooters: Risman Amran; Teh Chee Fei; Gan Kong Leong	Shooting	Men's skeet Team	9 June
Bronze	Abdul Hadi Farah Ann	Gymnastics-Artistic	Women's vault	9 June
Bronze	Abdul Hadi Farah Ann	Gymnastics-Artistic	Women's uneven bars	9 June
Bronze	Mohd Afendy Khairunneeta	Sailing	Female Laser Radial	9 June
Bronze	Alwi Iskandar	Athletics	Men's pole vault	9 June
Bronze	Cheah Esther	Bowling	Women's singles	9 June
Bronze	Jaafar Mohd Hadafi	Shooting	Men's 50m rifle prone	10 June
Bronze	Zulkifli Shalin; Afifah Syaidatul	Bowling	Women's doubles	10 June
Bronze	Abdul Hadi Farah Ann	Gymnastics-Artistic	Women's balance beam	10 June
Bronze	Chan Johnathan; Tan Timmy	Bowling	Men's doubles	10 June
Bronze	Yeap Kevin Soon Choy	Swimming	Men's 1500m freestyle	10 June
Bronze	Kong Erika Chia Chia	Swimming	Women's 50m breaststroke	10 June
Bronze	Hussin Adi Aliffudin	Athletics	Men's shot put	10 June
Bronze	Wong Johnathan Guanjie	Shooting	Men's 50m pistol	11 June
Bronze	Saipu Rahman Muhammed Ashraf	Athletics	Men's high jump	11 June
Bronze	Athletes: Mazlan Nurul Faizah Asma; Mohd Yusuf Fathin Faqihah; Vallabouy Shereen Samson; Zainuddin Zaimah Atifah	Athletics	Women's 4x400m relay	11 June
Bronze	Wong Fu Kang	Swimming	Men's 50m breaststroke	11 June
Bronze	Players: Ab Latif Mohamad Arif; Chan Peng Soon; Chong Wei Feng; Goh W Shem; Lee Chong Wei; Mak Hee Chun; Tan Aik Quan; Tan Wee Kiong; Teo Kok Siang; Z. Zainuddin Iskandar	Badminton	Men's team	11 June
Bronze	Yong Jin Kun	Taekwondo	Men's individual poomsae	12 June
Bronze	Mohamed Taibi Nur Suryani	Shooting	Women's 50m rifle 3 positions	12 June
Bronze	Players: Chew Wei Yan; Kok Jun Ee; Yong Jin Kun	Taekwondo	Men's team poomsae	12 June
Bronze	Som Net Ju Pha	Cycling	Women's criterium	12 June
Bronze	Yoong Hanifah Aiden	Waterskiing	Men's tricks	12 June
Bronze	Vallabouy Shereen Samson	Athletics	Women's 400m	12 June
Bronze	Athletes: Mohamad Nafiah Noor Amira; Mohamad Siti Fatima; Selvaretnam Komalam Shally; Zulkifli Zaidatul Husniah	Athletics	Women's 4x100 relay	12 June
Bronze	Zainal Nurul Shuhada	Cycling	Women's mass start road race	13 June
Bronze	Yoong Loong Alexander Charles	Waterskiing	Men's slalom	13 June
Bronze	Archers: Azhar Farah Amalina; Loke Shin Hui; Abdul Halil Nur Afisa	Archery	Women's team recurve	13 June
Bronze	Ridzuan Arieffudin	Pencak silat	Men's tanding class A (45-50kg)	13 June
Bronze	Yoong Loong Alexander Charles	Waterskiing	Men's jump	13 June
Bronze	Mohd Nazri Nor Nabila Natasha	Sailing	Female optimist (U16)	13 June
Bronze	Zailudin Ahmad Shahrozli	Pencak silat	Men's tanding class C (55-60kg)	13 June
Bronze	Khalid Mohd Fauzi	Pencak silat	Men's tanding class F (70-75kg)	13 June
Bronze	Players: Che Ab Wahab Siti Norzubaidah; Rosli Elly Syahira; Md Zulkifli Nurul Izzatul Hikmah; Ismail Nor Farhana; Jafri Siti Nor Suhaida	Sepak takraw	Women's regu	13 June
Bronze	Rozali Mohd Zulfadli; Daham Mazli	Rowing	Men's pair (1000m)	14 June
Bronze	Manan Anuar	Cycling	Men's mass start road race	14 June
Bronze	Players: Kao Lin Ken; Koay Adrian Hun Yi; Toh Indy Benjamin Ji Min; Chong Zephaniah En Wei; Marcus Joerel Jarrow Jr; Gopalan Sasitheran; Desmond Dass Tristan; Chiam Ter Min; Lee Gary Kah Yoon; Vijaya Kumar Ravi Kumar; Khor Kuan Yang; Lim Kai Sheng; Yeoh Jun Wooi; Abdul Rahim Khalid; Chong Chao Sheng; Anuar Adzhar Sjaiful; Low Kien Teck; Md Zin Taqiuddin Izzat; Razman Rizal; Ahmad Hadzim Azmill	Floorball	Men	14 June
Bronze	Papunaidu Thinagaran Naidu	Taekwondo	Men's under 68kg	14 June
Bronze	Mazuki Mohd Juwaidi	Archery	Men's individual compound	14 June
Bronze	Ang Adrian	Bowling	Men's masters	14 June
Bronze	Goh Jin Wei	Badminton	Women's singles	15 June

== Multiple medalists ==
Multiple medalists
Name	Sport	1st place, gold medalist(s)	2nd place, silver medalist(s)	3rd place, bronze medalist(s)	Total
Ooi Tze Liang	Diving	4	-	-	4
Ismail M. Rafiq	Bowling	3	1	-	4
Mat Salleh Fatin Nurfatehah	Archery	3	-	-	3
Abdul Hadi Farah Ann	Gymnastics-Artistic	2	1	3	6
Tan Ing Yueh	Gymnastics-Artistic	2	1	-	3
Hanifah Yoong Aaliyah	Waterskiing	2	1	-	3
Cheah Esther	Bowling	2	-	1	3
Tan Timmy	Bowling	2	-	1	3
Mazuki Mohd Juwaidi	Archery	2	-	1	3
Thor Chuan Leong	Billiards and snooker	2	-	-	2
Muaz Ahmad	Bowling	2	-	-	2
Sin Li Jane	Bowling	2	-	-	2
Kaman Shah Muhammad Fauzi	Sailing	2	-	-	2
M. Arnold Rachel	Squash	2	-	-	2
S. Chal Sanjay	Squash	2	-	-	2
Saleh Mohd Harrif	Cycling	2	-	-	2
Mohamad Latif Nur Shazrin	Sailing	2	-	-	2
