= Triathlon at the 2015 SEA Games =

2015 SEA Games

- Venue: East Coast Park
- Dates: 6 June 2015 to 7 June 2015
- Competitors: 21 from 6 nations

Triathlon at the 2015 SEA Games was held in East Coast Park, Singapore from 6 to 7 June 2015.

== Participating nations ==
A total of 21 athletes from six nations competed in triathlon at the 2015 Southeast Asian Games:

- Cambodia (2)
- Malaysia (4)
- Myanmar (4)
- Philippines (4)
- Singapore (4)
- Thailand (3)

== Medalists ==
Event	Gold	Silver	Bronze
Men's individual	Nikko Bryan Huelgas; Philippines	Rikigoro Shinozuka; Malaysia	Loo Chuan Rong; Singapore
Women's individual	Ma. Claire Adorna; Philippines	Kim Mangrobang; Philippines	Sarunthai Arunsiri; Thailand

== Medal table ==
* Host nation (Singapore)

Rank	Nation	Gold	Silver	Bronze	Total
1	Philippines (PHI)	2	1	0	3
2	Malaysia (MAS)	0	1	0	1
3	Singapore (SIN)*	0	0	1	1
3	Thailand (THA)	0	0	1	1
Totals (4 entries)		2	2	2	6
