= Synchronised swimming at the 2015 SEA Games =

- Venue: OCBC Aquatic Centre
- Dates: 2–4 June 2015
- Competitors: 45 from 6 nations

Synchronised swimming at the 2015 Southeast Asian Games was held in the OCBC Aquatic Centre, in Kallang, Singapore from 2 to 4 June 2015.

== Participating nations ==
A total of 45 athletes from six nations competed in synchronised swimming at the 2015 Southeast Asian Games:

- Indonesia (11)
- Malaysia (9)
- Philippines (2)
- Singapore (12)
- Thailand (7)
- Vietnam (4)

== Competition schedule ==
The following was the competition schedule for the synchronised swimming competitions:

T	Technical routine	F	Free routine

Event↓/Date →	Tue 2	Wed 3	Thu 4
Duet	T	F	F
Team	T	F	
Free combination			F

== Medalists ==
Event	Gold	Silver	Bronze
Duet	Malaysia (MAS); Katrina Ann Abdul Hadi; Lee Yhing Huey	Singapore (SIN); Stephanie Chen Mei Qi; Lee Mei Shuang; Crystal Yap Yu Hui	Indonesia (INA); Anisa Feritrianti; Adela Amanda Nirmala; Claudia Megawati Suyanto
Team	Singapore (SIN); Chen Mei Qi Stephanie; Chen Mei Qing Natalie; Chew Wei Ling Geraldine; Goh Gwyneth Xiao Hui; Lee Mei Shuang; Lim Li Yi Shona; Soh Li Fei Debbie; Tay Aik Fen; Yap Yu Hui Crystal; Yong Miya Hsing	Malaysia (MAS); Abdul Hadi Katrina Ann; Foong Yan Nie; Gan Hua Wei; Gan Zhen Yu; Kwong Zhi Kei; Lee Yhing Huey; Lee Yiat Lum; Lee Yiat Xin; Taher Ali Tasha Jane	Indonesia (INA); Claudia Megawati Suyanto; Anisa Feritrianti; Adela Amanda Nirmala; Sabihisma Arsyi; Tri Eka Sandiri; Amara Cinthia Gebby; Livia Lukito; Sherly Haryono; Andriani Shintya Ardhana; Putri Yanindha Sari
Free combination	Singapore (SIN); Chen Mei Qi Stephanie; Chen Mei Qing Natalie; Chew Wei Ling Geraldine; Goh Gwyneth Xiao Hui; Lee Mei Shuang; Lim Li Yi Shona; Soh Li Fei Debbie; Tay Aik Fen; Yap Yu Hui Crystal; Yong Miya Hsing	Malaysia (MAS); Abdul Hadi Katrina Ann; Foong Yan Nie; Gan Hua Wei; Gan Zhen Yu; Kwong Zhi Kei; Lee Yhing Huey; Lee Yiat Lum; Lee Yiat Xin; Taher Ali Tasha Jane	Indonesia (INA); Andriani Shintya Ardhana; Sabihisma Arsyi; Anisa Feritrianti; Amara Cinthia Gebby; Sherly Haryono; Livia Lukito; Adela Amanda Nirmala; Tri Eka Sandiri; Putri Yanindha Sari; Claudia Megawati Suyanto

== Medal table ==
* Host nation (Singapore)

Rank	Nation	Gold	Silver	Bronze	Total
1	Singapore (SIN)*	2	1	0	3
2	Malaysia (MAS)	1	2	0	3
3	Indonesia (INA)	0	0	3	3
Totals (3 entries)		3	3	3	9

== Events ==
=== Women's duet ===
Synchronised swimming – Women's duet at the 2015 SEA Games
- Venue: OCBC Aquatic Centre
- Dates: 2–4 June 2015
- Competitors: 19 from 6 nations
- Winning points: 150.9103

Medalists
gold medal	Abdul Hadi Katrina Ann; Lee Yhing Huey	Malaysia
silver medal	Chen Mei Qi Stephanie; Lee Mei Shuang; Yap Yu Hui Crystal	Singapore
bronze medal	Feritrianti Anisa; Nirmala Adela Amanda; Suyanto Claudia Megawati	Indonesia

The women's duet competition of the synchronised swimming event at the 2015 Southeast Asian Games was held from 2–4 June 2015 at the OCBC Aquatics Centre in Singapore. The defending Southeast Asian Champion is the duet from Malaysia.

==== Schedule ====
All times are Singapore Standard Time (UTC+8).

Date	Start	Round
Tuesday, 2 June	13:00	Technical Routine
Wednesday, 3 June	13:00	Free Routine Preliminary
Thursday, 4 June	13:00	Free Routine Final

==== Results (Preliminary) ====
Source: Final Results - Duet Technical and Free Routine - Free Routine Preliminary

Rank	Country	Athlete	Technical	Preliminary	Total
1	Malaysia	Abdul Hadi Katrina Ann; Lee Yhing Huey	75.3436	76.3333	151.6769
2	Singapore	Chen Mei Qi Stephanie; Yap Yu Hui Crystal; Lee Mei Shuang	73.9705	75.2333	149.2038
3	Singapore	Chen Mei Qing Natalie; Soh Li Fei Debbie; Goh Gwyneth Xiao Hui	70.4160	72.7333	143.1493
4	Indonesia	Nirmala Adela Amanda; Suyanto Claudia Megawati; Feritrianti Anisa	68.6547	70.3000	138.9547
5	Vietnam	Huỳnh Minh Trang; Phan Mãnh Nhi	65.8011	67.5000	133.3011
6	Thailand	Polsen Nantaya; Puttisiriroj Thanyaluck	64.3425	67.1000	131.4425
7	Vietnam	Nguyễn Thị Minh Xuân; Phan Tăng Bảo Trân	61.5772	63.0667	124.6439
8	Philippines	Salvador Allyssa Marey; Tiambeng Jemimah Nissi	43.7238	54.2667	97.9905

==== Results (Final) ====
Source: Final Results - Duet Technical and Free Routine - Free Routine Finals

Rank	Country	Athlete	Technical	Final	Total
1st place, gold medalist(s)	Malaysia	Abdul Hadi Katrina Ann; Lee Yhing Huey	75.3436	75.5667	150.9103
2nd place, silver medalist(s)	Singapore	Chen Mei Qi Stephanie; Yap Yu Hui Crystal; Lee Mei Shuang	73.9705	75.8667	149.8372
3rd place, bronze medalist(s)	Indonesia	Nirmala Adela Amanda; Suyanto Claudia Megawati; Feritrianti Anisa	68.6547	70.4333	139.0880
4	Vietnam	Huỳnh Minh Trang; Phan Mãnh Nhi	65.8011	67.3000	133.1011
5	Thailand	Polsen Nantaya; Puttisiriroj Thanyaluck	64.3425	66.7000	131.0425
6	Philippines	Salvador Allyssa Marey; Tiambeng Jemimah Nissi	43.7238	53.0333	96.7571

=== Women's team ===
Synchronised swimming – Women's team at the 2015 SEA Games
- Venue: OCBC Aquatic Centre
- Dates: 2–3 June 2015
- Competitors: 34 from 4 nations
- Winning score: 150.8445

Medalists
gold medal	Chen Mei Qi Stephanie; Chen Mei Qing Natalie; Chew Wei Ling Geraldine; Goh Gwyneth Xiao Hui; Lee Mei Shuang; Soh Li Fei Debbie; Yap Yu Hui Crystal; Yong Miya Hsing; Lim Li Yi Shona; Tay Aik Fen	Singapore
silver medal	Abdul Hadi Katrina Ann; Foong Yan Nie; Gan Hua Wei; Gan Zhen Yu; Kwong Zhi Kei; Lee Yhing Huey; Lee Yiat Lum; Taher Ali Tasha Jane; Lee Yiat Xin	Malaysia
bronze medal	Ardhana Andriani Shintya; Arsyi Sabihisma; Feritrianti Anisa; Gebby Amara Cinthia; Lukito Livia; Nirmala Adela Amanda; Sandiri Tri Eka; Suyanto Claudia Megawati; Haryono Sherly; Sari Putri Yanindha	Indonesia

The women's team competition of the synchronised swimming event at the 2015 Southeast Asian Games was held from 2–3 June 2015 at the OCBC Aquatics Centre in Singapore. The defending Southeast Asian Champion is the team from Malaysia.

==== Schedule ====
All times are Singapore Standard Time (UTC+8).

Date	Start	Round
Tuesday, 2 June 2015	20:00	Preliminary Technical Routine
Wednesday, 3 June 2015	20:00	Final Free Routine

==== Results ====
Source: Final Results - Team Technical and Free Routine

Rank	Country	Technical	Free	Total
1	Singapore; Chen Mei Qi Stephanie; Chen Mei Qing Natalie; Chew Wei Ling Geraldine; Goh Gwyneth Xiao Hui; Lee Mei Shuang; Soh Li Fei Debbie; Yap Yu Hui Crystal; Yong Miya Hsing; Lim Li Yi Shona; Tay Aik Fen	74.3445	76.5000	150.8445
2	Malaysia; Abdul Hadi Katrina Ann; Foong Yan Nie; Gan Hua Wei; Gan Zhen Yu; Kwong Zhi Kei; Lee Yhing Huey; Lee Yiat Lum; Taher Ali Tasha Jane; Lee Yiat Xin	72.3537	74.1667	146.5204
3	Indonesia; Ardhana Andriani Shintya; Arsyi Sabihisma; Feritrianti Anisa; Gebby Amara Cinthia; Lukito Livia; Nirmala Adela Amanda; Sandiri Tri Eka; Suyanto Claudia Megawati; Haryono Sherly; Sari Putri Yanindha	68.1463	70.0333	138.1796
4	Thailand; Jaroenmaksuwan Lapus; Phlisorn Panramon; Poolprasat Kairika; Poolprasat Karima; Boonrod Thitirat	46.6419	50.5000	97.1419

=== Women's free combination ===
Women's free combination at the 2015 SEA Games
- Venue: OCBC Aquatic Centre
- Dates: 4 June 2015
- Competitors: 36 from 4 nations
- Winning score: 77.0667

Medalists
gold medal	Chen Mei Qi Stephanie; Chen Mei Qing Natalie; Chew Wei Ling Geraldine; Goh Gwyneth Xiao Hui; Lee Mei Shuang; Lim Li Yi Shona; Soh Li Fei Debbie; Tay Aik Fen; Yap Yu Hui Crystal; Yong Miya Hsing	Singapore
silver medal	Abdul Hadi Katrina Ann; Foong Yan Nie; Gan Hua Wei; Gan Zhen Yu; Kwong Zhi Kei; Lee Yhing Huey; Lee Yiat Lum; Lee Yiat Xin; Taher Ali Tasha Jane	Malaysia
bronze medal	Ardhana Andriani Shintya; Arsyi Sabihisma; Feritrianti Anisa; Gebby Amara Cinthia; Haryono Sherly; Lukito Livia; Nirmala Adela Amanda; Sandiri Tri Eka; Sari Putri Yanindha; Suyanto Claudia Megawati	Indonesia

The women's free combination competition of the synchronised swimming event at the 2015 Southeast Asian Games was held on 4 June 2015 at the OCBC Aquatics Centre in Singapore. The defending Southeast Asian Champion is the free combination from Malaysia.

==== Schedule ====
All times are Singapore Standard Time (UTC+8).

Date	Start	Round
Thursday, 4 June 2015	20:00	Free combination

==== Results ====
Source: Results - Team Free Combination

Rank	Team	Score
1st place, gold medalist(s)	Singapore (SIN); Chen Mei Qi Stephanie; Chen Mei Qing Natalie; Chew Wei Ling Geraldine; Goh Gwyneth Xiao Hui; Lee Mei Shuang; Lim Li Yi Shona; Soh Li Fei Debbie; Tay Aik Fen; Yap Yu Hui Crystal; Yong Miya Hsing	77.0667
2nd place, silver medalist(s)	Malaysia (MAS); Abdul Hadi Katrina Ann; Foong Yan Nie; Gan Hua Wei; Gan Zhen Yu; Kwong Zhi Kei; Lee Yhing Huey; Lee Yiat Lum; Lee Yiat Xin; Taher Ali Tasha Jane	73.7333
3rd place, bronze medalist(s)	Indonesia (INA); Ardhana Andriani Shintya; Arsyi Sabihisma; Feritrianti Anisa; Gebby Amara Cinthia; Haryono Sherly; Lukito Livia; Nirmala Adela Amanda; Sandiri Tri Eka; Sari Putri Yanindha; Suyanto Claudia Megawati	71.6667
4	Vietnam (VIE); Huỳnh Minh Trang; Nguyễn Thị Minh Xuân; Phan Mãnh Nhi; Phan Tăng Bảo Trân	62.7333
