= Archery at the 2015 SEA Games =

- Venue: Kallang Cricket Field
- Dates: 10–14 June 2015
- Competitors: 117 from 8 nations

Archery at the 2015 SEA Games was held at the Kallang Cricket Field, in Kallang, Singapore from 10 to 14 June 2015. Five competitions will be held in men, women and mixed's recurve and in men, women and mixed's compound.

== Participating nations ==
A total of 117 athletes from eight nations will be competing in archery at the 2015 Southeast Asian Games:

- Indonesia (13)
- Laos (8)
- Malaysia (16)
- Myanmar (16)
- Philippines (16)
- Singapore (16)
- Thailand (16)
- Vietnam (16)

== Competition schedule ==
The following is the competition schedule for the archery competitions:

Q	Qualifications	R16	Round of 16	¼	Quarterfinals	½	Semifinals	B	Bronze medal match	F	Final

Event↓/Date →	Wed 10	Thu 11			Fri 12			Sat 13		Sun 14	
Men's individual recurve	Q	R16	¼	½				B	F		
Men's team recurve	Q		¼	½				B	F		
Women's individual recurve	Q	R16	¼	½				B	F		
Women's team recurve	Q		¼	½				B	F		
Mixed team recurve	Q		¼	½				B	F		
Men's individual compound	Q				R16	¼	½			B	F
Men's team compound	Q					¼	½			B	F
Women's individual compound	Q				R16	¼	½			B	F
Women's team compound	Q					¼	½			B	F
Mixed team compound	Q					¼	½			B	F

== Medal table ==
* Host nation (Singapore)

Rank	Nation	Gold	Silver	Bronze	Total
1	Malaysia	5	3	2	10
2	Indonesia	2	3	1	6
3	Vietnam	2	1	2	5
4	Thailand	1	2	0	3
5	Philippines	0	1	3	4
6	Singapore*	0	0	2	2
Totals (6 entries)		10	10	10	30

== Medalists ==
=== Recurve ===
Event	Gold	Silver	Bronze
Men's individual	Witthaya Thamwong; Thailand	Haziq Kamaruddin; Malaysia	Tan Si Lie; Singapore
Women's individual	Titik Kusumawardani; Indonesia	Lộc Thị Đào; Vietnam	Lê Thị Thu Hiền; Vietnam
Men's team	Malaysia; Khairul Anuar Mohamad; Muhamad Ikram Joni; Haziq Kamaruddin	Indonesia; Hendra Purnama; Riau Ega Agatha; Muhammad Hanif Wijaya	Singapore; Tan Si Lie; Zhang Jingkang; Keith Teo Kee Hui
Women's team	Vietnam; Lê Thị Thu Hiền; Lộc Thị Đào; Nguyễn Thị Quyền Trang	Indonesia; Titik Kusumawardani; Ika Yuliana Rochmawati; Diananda Choirunisa	Malaysia; Loke Shin Hui; Nur Afisa Abdul Halil; Farah Amalina Azhar
Mixed team	Indonesia; Riau Ega Agatha; Ika Yuliana Rochmawati	Malaysia; Khairul Anuar Mohamad; Loke Shin Hui	Vietnam; Đào Trọng Kiên; Lộc Thị Đào

=== Compound ===
Event	Gold	Silver	Bronze
Men's individual	Nguyễn Tiến Cương; Vietnam	Zulfadhli Ruslan; Malaysia	Mohd Juwaidi Mazuki; Malaysia
Women's individual	Fatin Nurfatehah Mat Salleh; Malaysia	Amaya Cojuangco; Philippines	Rona Siska Sari; Indonesia
Men's team	Malaysia; Lee Kin Lip; Mohd Juwaidi Mazuki; Zulfadhli Ruslan	Indonesia; I Gusti Nyoman Puruhito; Sapriatno; Yoke Rizaldi Akbar	Philippines; Paul Marton Dela Cruz; Delfin Anthony Adriano; Earl Benjamin Yap
Women's team	Malaysia; Saritha Cham Nong; Fatin Nurfatehah Mat Salleh; Nor Rizah Ishak	Thailand; Kanyavee Maneesombatkul; Sunee Detchokul; Nareumon Junsook	Philippines; Joann Tabanag; Jennifer Dy Chan; Amaya Cojuangco
Mixed team	Malaysia; Mohd Juwaidi Mazuki; Fatin Nurfatehah Mat Salleh	Thailand; Chanchai Pratheepwatanawong; Kanyavee Maneesombatkul	Philippines; Earl Benjamin Yap; Amaya Cojuangco

== Results ==
=== Recurve ===
==== Men's Ranking Round ====
Rank	Athlete	Score	10s	Xs
1	Witthaya Thamwong (THA)	663	31	8
2	Khairul Anuar Mohamad (MAS)	662	24	4
3	Riau Ega Agatha (INA)	655	18	6
4	Muhammad Hanif Wijaya (INA)	650	21	8
5	Luis Gabriel Moreno (PHI)	645	24	6
6	Haziq Kamaruddin (MAS)	640	19	4
7	Tan Si Lie (SIN)	638	23	6
8	Muhamad Ikram Joni (MAS)	637	21	9
9	Aung Myo Thu (MYA)	635	22	4
10	Nay Myo Aung (MYA)	634	19	6
11	Atiq Bazil Bakri (MAS)	634	18	4
12	Zhang Jingkang (SIN)	631	21	8
13	Dao Trong Kien (VIE)	631	19	8
14	Natthapoom Phusawat (THA)	631	15	4
15	Hendra Purnama (INA)	628	19	7
16	Keith Teo Kee Hui (SIN)	627	18	5
17	Florante Matan (PHI)	626	17	7
18	Itsarin Thai-Uea (THA)	623	15	6
19	Khomkrit Duangsuwan (THA)	623	10	2
20	Chu Duc Anh (VIE)	620	13	5
21	Nguyen Van Duy (VIE)	617	16	5
22	Nyein Si Thu (MYA)	617	11	3
23	Mark Javier (PHI)	616	18	2
24	Nguyen Thanh Binh (VIE)	613	10	2
25	Saw Lu Kar (MYA)	612	12	4
26	Justin Ng Wei Qing (SIN)	603	11	4
27	Zander Lee Reyes (PHI)	588	9	2
28	Thongxay Sivilay (LAO)	524	4	0

==== Women's Ranking Round ====
Rank	Athlete	Score	10s	Xs
1	Loc Thi Dao (VIE)	652	20	8
2	Ika Yuliana Rochmawati (INA)	638	22	9
3	Titik Kusumawardani (INA)	637	16	3
4	Quah Kai Zhi (SIN)	635	19	3
5	Diananda Choirunisa (INA)	635	15	3
6	Le Thi Thu Hian (VIE)	633	20	4
7	Dillian Teo Zhi Ning (SIN)	632	18	4
8	Nguyen Phuong Linh (VIE)	619	13	5
9	Nguyen Thi Quyen Trang (VIE)	618	14	8
10	Rachelle Anne Dela Cruz (PHI)	618	14	2
11	Loke Shin Hui (MAS)	616	12	3
12	Kareel Meer Hongitan (PHI)	612	12	1
13	Erwina Safitri (INA)	604	17	7
14	San Yu Htwe (MYA)	600	12	5
15	Sukanye Buayen (THA)	600	12	5
