= Tanglin Club =

Social club in Singapore

- Established: October 1865; 161 years ago
- Location: 5 Stevens Road Singapore 257814
- President: Chong Zhi Cheng
- General Manager: Christopher Spencer
- Website: www.tanglinclub.org

The Tanglin Club is a private members' club in Singapore. The club has 4,000 principal members and reciprocal partnerships with over 130 private clubs. Its memberships begins at $100,000.

== History ==
The Tanglin Club was founded in 1865. That year, an interim committee was formed, and it comprised Thomas Dunman (president), Herbert Buchanan (vice-president), Lancelot C. Masfen, Jos. M. Webster, William Mulholland, Walter Oldham, Edwin A. G. C. Cooke and John R. Forrester. Only Europeans were admitted, and club members were mainly British. While the exact foundation date of the Tanglin Club is uncertain, it has been suspected that the date that had been determined by the Tanglin Club Centenary Celebrations Committee in 1865 was the most convenient day to hold the celebrations. Two letters, which appeared in the Singapore Daily Times on 11 and 13 November 1865, allude to the formation of the club. In October 1865, legal documents showed this club to be the Tanglin Club.

On 26 June 1866, a property was purchased in the District of Claymore from Arthur Hughes de Wind for 600 dollars. In December 1866, the trustees of the club borrowed 5,000 Spanish dollars to build a clubhouse with bowling alleys, billiards rooms and stables. The club was possibly named after a Tanglin tree where one might have been growing on the spot where the clubhouse stood. About two years after its founding, the club's management committee was unable to repay the first installment of 2,000 Spanish dollars, which was due on 30 November 1868. The second installment of the principal mortgage sum was due on 30 November 1871; the club was unable to pay both. Ten years after the loan of 5,000 dollars was drawn, the club could not repay any of the principal sum borrowed.

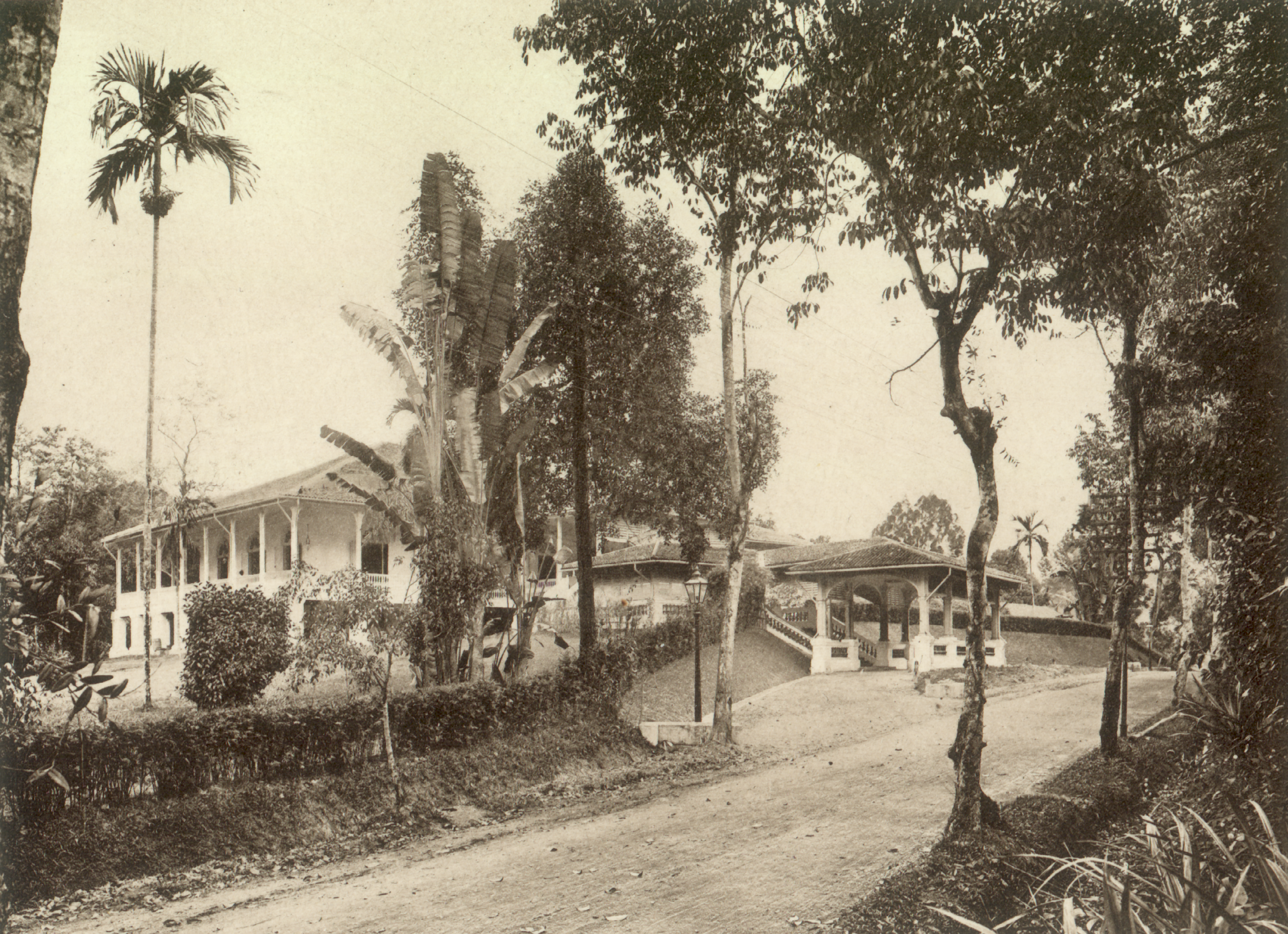
Tanglin Club in Singapore, c. 1910

During the construction of the German Teutonia Club (present-day Goodwood Park Hotel), the Tanglin Club accommodated the Teutonia members. When World War I started in 1914, Teutonia Club was declared an enemy property. In the early 1920s, the Tanglin Club purchased additional blocks of land. During the Great Depression, the finances of the club were strained. During the Japanese occupation, the Tanglin Club was used by the Japanese army as a club for their officers. The club was also used as a base for their propaganda unit as well as their storage area. After the Japanese surrender, the Tanglin Club came under the management of the Navy, Army and Air Force Institutes (NAAFI) until March 1946. It was not until 1 September 1946 that the club was informally reopened.

In the dining room of the Singapore Club on 21 May 1946, to reinstate the Tanglin Club, an institution founded seventy-five years earlier as a premier establishment. The club reopened on 1 September 1946, with 182 Ordinary Members, including 127 pre-war registered members, 23 lady members and provision for up to 300 service members. In 1971, the pullout of the British forces stationed in Singapore was completed. At a special meeting on 3 May 1973, the category of Service membership was deleted from the club rules.

The construction of a new four-storey clubhouse was carried out in phases since September 1977 and was completed in March 1981. On 25 April 1998, the clubhouse was officially opened by the then Minister for Law, Edmund W. Barker.

Committee members planted a Tanglin tree at the poolside area on 14 December 2015. A charity drive raised a total of nearly $450,000. During the club's Charity Black Tie Gala Dinner in November 2015, a cheque of $195,975 was presented to Singapore President Tony Tan for the President's Challenge. By December 2015, the final donation to the President's Challenge amounted to $220,625.

== Facilities ==
The club's recreation facilities include a saltwater pool, indoor and outdoor tennis courts, squash courts, billiards room, lawn bowls green, a gymnasium, library, jackpot room, hair salon, and children’s playroom. The club features overnight guest rooms, six restaurants, and meeting and conference facilities.
