= Rugby union in Cambodia =

Rugby union in Cambodia is a minor but growing sport. Its governing body is the Cambodian Federation of Rugby.

== History ==
Rugby was originally introduced when Cambodia was part of French Indochina, mainly by French expatriates. After independence, there was a long hiatus due to financial and political forces (including famine and the Khmer Rouge regime) that meant it was effectively impossible for the game to be played.

The game became re-established in the 1990s, partly through the presence of British, Singaporean and Australian expatriates. The Rugby Club du Cambodge was set up in 1996, with its senior team known as Les Piliers d’Angkor. The Indochinese Cup was established in 1999, as a four sided tournament between Vietnamese teams from Saïgon and Hanoi, Vientiane (Laos) and Phnom Penh in Cambodia.

In January 2000, the NGO, "Pour un Sourire d'Enfant", which looks after poverty stricken children, taught children the sport, and from there it has spread into some Cambodian schools.

In 2000, and 2001, the first tournament was set up, and a National Competition.

In 2001, the Angkor 10s was set up, and is still held annually.

Cambodia sent a team to compete in the Bangkok Sevens in 2004.

Cambodia takes part in the South East Asia region of the Asian Five Nations.

== See also ==
- Cambodia national rugby union team
