= Billiards and snooker at the 2015 SEA Games =

- Venue: OCBC Arena Hall 4
- Dates: 6–10 June 2015
- Competitors: 82 from 9 nations

Billiards and snooker at the 2015 SEA Games was held in OCBC Arena Hall 4, in Kallang, Singapore from 6 to 10 June 2015. Ten competitions was held in men's snooker singles, snooker doubles, English billiards singles, English billiards singles (500 points), English billiards doubles, English billiards team, 9-ball pool doubles and in men's 1 cushion carom and in men, women's 9-ball pool singles.

== Participating nations ==
A total of 82 athletes from nine nations competed in billiards and snooker at the 2015 SEA Games:

- Brunei (2)
- Indonesia (10)
- Laos (4)
- Malaysia (8)
- Myanmar (12)
- Philippines (12)
- Singapore (11)
- Thailand (11)
- Vietnam (12)

== Medalists ==
=== Snooker ===
Event	Gold	Silver	Bronze
Men's singles	Thor Chuan Leong; Malaysia	Htet Ko; Myanmar	Michael Angelo Mengorio; Philippines
Men's singles	Thor Chuan Leong; Malaysia	Htet Ko; Myanmar	Ang Boon Chin; Singapore
Men's doubles	Malaysia; Moh Keen Hoo; Thor Chuan Leong	Thailand; Kritsanut Lertsattayathorn; Ratchayothin Yotharuck	Philippines; Alvin Barbero; Michael Angelo Mengorio
Men's doubles	Malaysia; Moh Keen Hoo; Thor Chuan Leong	Thailand; Kritsanut Lertsattayathorn; Ratchayothin Yotharuck	Singapore; Lim Chun Kiat; Tey Choon Kiat

=== English billiards ===
Event	Gold	Silver	Bronze
Men's singles	Peter Gilchrist; Singapore	Htay Aung; Myanmar	Oo Kyaw; Myanmar
Men's singles	Peter Gilchrist; Singapore	Htay Aung; Myanmar	Praprut Chaithanasakun; Thailand
Men's singles (500 points)	Peter Gilchrist; Singapore	Nguyễn Thanh Bình; Vietnam	Praprut Chaithanasakun; Thailand
Men's singles (500 points)	Peter Gilchrist; Singapore	Nguyễn Thanh Bình; Vietnam	Thawat Sujaritthurakarn; Thailand
Men's doubles	Myanmar; Htay Aung; Tun Min Si Thu	Singapore; Chan Keng Kwang; Peter Gilchrist	Thailand; Praprut Chaithanasakun; Thawat Sujaritthurakarn
Men's doubles	Myanmar; Htay Aung; Tun Min Si Thu	Singapore; Chan Keng Kwang; Peter Gilchrist	Vietnam; Nguyễn Thanh Bình; Nguyen Trung Kien
Men's team	Thailand; Praprut Chaithanasakun; Thawat Sujaritthurakarn; Suriya Suwannasingh	Myanmar; Aung Htay; Kyaw Oo; Min Si Thu Tun	Indonesia; Jaka Kurniawan; Sahroni; Marlando Sihombing
Men's team	Thailand; Praprut Chaithanasakun; Thawat Sujaritthurakarn; Suriya Suwannasingh	Myanmar; Aung Htay; Kyaw Oo; Min Si Thu Tun	Vietnam; Nguyễn Thanh Bình; Nguyễn Trung Kiên; Phạm Hoài Nam

=== 9-ball pool ===
Event	Gold	Silver	Bronze
Men's singles	Dennis Orcollo; Philippines	Maung Maung; Myanmar	Carlo Biado; Philippines
Men's singles	Dennis Orcollo; Philippines	Maung Maung; Myanmar	Đỗ Hoàng Quân; Vietnam
Women's singles	Chezka Centeno; Philippines	Rubilen Amit; Philippines	Aung Aye Mi; Myanmar
Women's singles	Chezka Centeno; Philippines	Rubilen Amit; Philippines	Siraphat Chitchomnart; Thailand
Men's doubles	Philippines; Carlo Biado; Warren Kiamco	Vietnam; Đỗ Hoàng Quân; Nguyễn Anh Tuấn	Myanmar; Maung Maung; Thu Aung Moe
Men's doubles	Philippines; Carlo Biado; Warren Kiamco	Vietnam; Đỗ Hoàng Quân; Nguyễn Anh Tuấn	Singapore; Toh Lian Han; Aloysius Yapp

=== 1 cushion carom ===
Event	Gold	Silver	Bronze
Men's singles	Trần Phi Hùng; Vietnam	Mã Minh Cẩm; Vietnam	Efren Reyes; Philippines
Men's singles	Trần Phi Hùng; Vietnam	Mã Minh Cẩm; Vietnam	Francisco Dela Cruz; Philippines

== Results ==
=== Men ===
==== Snooker singles ====
Preliminary; 6–7 June
KRITSANUT L. (THA)	4
RACHMANTO Yoni (INA)	0
HTET Ko (MYA)	4
PHAM Thanh Thuy (VIE)	2
MENGORIO Michael Angelo (PHI)	4
SAKBIENG Sithideth (LAO)	0
CHAN Keng Kwang (SIN)	4
MOH Keen Hoo (MAS)	3
THOR Chuan Leong (MAS)	4
DOAPHACHAN P. (LAO)	0
THANAWAT T. (THA)	4
PUTRA Gebby Adi Wibawa (INA)	0
ANG Boon Chin (SIN)	4
NGUYEN Nhat Thanh (VIE)	0
BARBERO Alvin (PHI)	1
KO Win Ko (MYA)	4

Quarterfinal; 7 June
KRITSANUT L. (THA)	3
HTET Ko (MYA)	4
MENGORIO Michael Angelo (PHI)	4
CHAN Keng Kwang (SIN)	3
THOR Chuan Leong (MAS)	4
THANAWAT T. (THA)	3
ANG Boon Chin (SIN)	4
KO Win Ko (MYA)	0

Semifinal; 8 June
HTET Ko (MYA)	4
MENGORIO Michael Angelo (PHI)	0
THOR Chuan Leong (MAS)	4
ANG Boon Chin (SIN)	1

Final; 8 June
HTET Ko (MYA)	2
THOR Chuan Leong (MAS)	4

==== Snooker doubles ====
Quarterfinal; 9 June		Semifinal; 9 June		Final; 10 June
KRITSANUT L. (THA); YOTHARUCK Ratchayothin (THA)	3
PUTRA Gebby Adi Wibawa (INA); RACHMANTO Yoni (INA)	0	KRITSANUT L. (THA); YOTHARUCK Ratchayothin (THA)	3
SURIYA M. (LAO); SAKBIENG Sithideth (LAO)	1	LIM Chun Kiat (SIN); TEY Choon Kiat (SIN)	1
LIM Chun Kiat (SIN); TEY Choon Kiat (SIN)	3			KRITSANUT L. (THA); YOTHARUCK Ratchayothin (THA)	0
MOH Keen Hoo (MAS); THOR Chuan Leong (MAS)	3			MOH Keen Hoo (MAS); THOR Chuan Leong (MAS)	3
NGUYEN Nhat Thanh (VIE); PHAM Thanh Thuy (VIE)	0	MOH Keen Hoo (MAS); THOR Chuan Leong (MAS)	3
BARBERO Alvin (PHI); MENGORIO Michael Angelo (PHI)	3	BARBERO Alvin (PHI); MENGORIO Michael Angelo (PHI)	0
HTET Ko (MYA); KO Win Ko (MYA)	0

==== English billiards singles ====
Preliminary; 7 June
CHOOI Yew Wah (MAS)	0
KURNIAWAN Jaka (INA)	3
NGUYEN Thanh Binh (VIE)	3
SUJARITTHURAKARN Thawat (THA)	0
RODA Jefrey (PHI)	1
OO Kyaw (MYA)	3
CHAITHANASAKUN Praprut (THA)	3
HASSAN Mohd Reza (MAS)	0
GRANDEA Reynaldo (PHI)	1
PHAM Hoai Nam (VIE)	3
SIHOMBING Marlando (INA)	3
YEO Teck Shin (SIN)	1

Quarterfinals; 8 June
GILCHRIST Peter Edward (SIN)	3
KURNIAWAN Jaka (INA)	1
NGUYEN Thanh Binh (VIE)	2
OO Kyaw (MYA)	3
CHAITHANASAKUN Praprut (THA)	3
PHAM Hoai Nam (VIE)	0
SIHOMBING Marlando (INA)	0
HTAY Aung (MYA)	3

Semifinals; 8 June
GILCHRIST Peter Edward (SIN)	3
OO Kyaw (MYA)	1
CHAITHANASAKUN Praprut (THA)	1
HTAY Aung (MYA)	3

Final; 8 June
GILCHRIST Peter Edward (SIN)	3
HTAY Aung (MYA)	0

==== English billiards singles (500) ====
Preliminary; 6 June
KO Chit Ko (MYA)	500
Jaka Kurniawan (INA)	160
Jefrey Roda (PHI)	228
Yeo Teck Shin (SIN)	501
Chooi Yew Wah (MAS)	162
Thawat Sujaritthurakarn (THA)	501
Reynaldo Grandea (PHI)	62
Praprut Chaithanasakun (THA)	500
OO Kyaw (MYA)	387
Marlando Sihombing (INA)	501
PHAM Hoai Nam (VIE)	359
Peter Gilchrist (SIN)	501

Quarterfinals; 6 June
Nguyễn Thanh Bình (VIE)	501
KO Chit Ko (MYA)	365
Yeo Teck Shin (SIN)	273
Thawat Sujaritthurakarn (THA)	363
Praprut Chaithanasakun (THA)	501
Marlando Sihombing (INA)	284
Peter Gilchrist (SIN)	502
Mohd Reza Hassan (MAS)	82

Semifinals; 7 June
Nguyễn Thanh Bình (VIE)	500
Thawat Sujaritthurakarn (THA)	355
Praprut Chaithanasakun (THA)	432
Peter Gilchrist (SIN)	502

Final; 7 June
Nguyễn Thanh Bình (VIE)	291
Peter Gilchrist (SIN)	501

==== English billiards doubles ====
Quarterfinal; 9 June		Semifinal; 9 June		Final; 9 June
		Praprut C. (THA); SUJARITTHURAKARN T. (THA)	2
GRANDEA Reynaldo (PHI); RODA Jefrey (PHI)	1	CHAN Keng Kwang (SIN); GILCHRIST Peter Edward (SIN)	3
CHAN Keng Kwang (SIN); GILCHRIST Peter Edward (SIN)	3			CHAN Keng Kwang (SIN); GILCHRIST Peter Edward (SIN)	2
NGUYEN Thanh Binh (VIE); NGUYEN Trung Kien (VIE)	3			HTAY Aung (MYA); TUN Min Si Thu (MYA)	3
CHOOI Yew Wah (MAS); HASSAN Mohd Reza (MAS)	0	NGUYEN Thanh Binh (VIE); NGUYEN Trung Kien (VIE)	1
KURNIAWAN Jaka (INA); SIHOMBING Marlando (INA)	0	HTAY Aung (MYA); TUN Min Si Thu (MYA)	3
HTAY Aung (MYA); TUN Min Si Thu (MYA)	3

==== English billiard team ====
Quarterfinals; 10 June		Semifinals; 10 June		Final; 10 June
		Myanmar	3
Philippines	0	Indonesia	1
Indonesia	3			Myanmar	1
Singapore	2			Thailand	3
Vietnam	3	Vietnam	0
Malaysia	0	Thailand	3
Thailand	3

==== 9-ball pool men's singles ====
Preliminary; 7 June
NG Jason Keat Siang (MAS)	3
Ahmad TAUFIQ (BRU)	9

Pre-Quarterfinal; 8 June
YANG Ricky (INA)	5
BIADO Carlo (PHI)	9
LE Quang Trung (VIE)	9
HONGSAVADY V. (LAO)	3
Ahmad TAUFIQ (BRU)	4
YAPP Aloysius (SIN)	9
TANUT M. (THA)	5
MAUNG Maung (MYA)	9
NITIWAT K (THA)	5
NASUTION Irsal Afrinneza (INA)	9
THU Aung Moe (MYA)	5
ORCOLLO Dennis (PHI)	9
DO Hoang Quan (VIE)	9
LIM Wei Kok (BRU)	3
GOH Chin Teck (SIN)	5
AMIR Ibrahim (MAS)	9

Quarterfinal; 9 June
BIADO Carlo (PHI)	9
LE Quang Trung (VIE)	6
YAPP Aloysius (SIN)	4
MAUNG Maung (MYA)	9
NASUTION Irsal Afrinneza (INA)	7
ORCOLLO Dennis (PHI)	9
DO Hoang Quan (VIE)	9
AMIR Ibrahim (MAS)	6

Semifinal; 9 June
BIADO Carlo (PHI)	6
MAUNG Maung (MYA)	9
ORCOLLO Dennis (PHI)	9
DO Hoang Quan (VIE)	5

Final; 10 June
MAUNG Maung (MYA)	4
ORCOLLO Dennis (PHI)	9

==== 9-ball pool women's singles ====
Pre-Quarterfinal; 6 June
DJAJALIE Klaudia (MAS)	5
CHITCHOMNART Siraphat (THA)	7
TAN Hui Ming Jessica (SIN)	7
HLAING Nwye Nwye (MYA)	4
CENTENO Chezka (PHI)	7
DOAN Thi Ngoc Le (VIE)	4
AUNG Aye Mi (MYA)	7
CHAI Zeet Huey Charlene (SIN)	6
SABTU Suhana Dewi (MAS)	7
HUYNH Thi Ngoc Huyen (VIE)	5
MASUM Fathrah (INA)	7
Waratthanun Sukritthanes (THA)	5

Quarterfinal; 7 June
TICOALU Angeline Magdalena (INA)	3
CHITCHOMNART Siraphat (THA)	7
TAN Hui Ming Jessica (SIN)	3
CENTENO Chezka (PHI)	7
AUNG Aye Mi (MYA)	7
SABTU Suhana Dewi (MAS)	5
MASUM Fathrah (INA)	2
AMIT Rubilen (PHI)	7

Semifinal; 8 June
CHITCHOMNART Siraphat (THA)	5
CENTENO Chezka (PHI)	7
AUNG Aye Mi (MYA)	2
AMIT Rubilen (PHI)	7

Final; 9 June
CENTENO Chezka (PHI)	7
AMIT Rubilen (PHI)	5

==== 9-ball pool men's doubles ====
Preliminary; 6 June
BIADO Carlo (PHI); KIAMCO Warren (PHI)	9
NITIWAT K. (THA); TANUT M. (THA)	6

Quarterfinal; 6 June
LIM Wei Kok (BRU); Ahmad TAUFIQ (BRU)	4
TOH Lian Han (SIN); YAPP Aloysius (SIN)	9
BIADO Carlo (PHI); KIAMCO Warren (PHI)	9
SURIYA M. (LAO); HONGSAVADY V. (LAO)	1
MAUNG Maung (MYA); THU Aung Moe (MYA)	9
NASUTION Irsal Afrinneza (INA); YANG Ricky (INA)	7
DO Hoang Quan (VIE); NGUYEN Anh Tuan (VIE)	9
AMIR Ibrahim (MAS); NG Jason Keat Siang (MAS)	2

Semifinal; 7 June
TOH Lian Han (SIN); YAPP Aloysius (SIN)	5
BIADO Carlo (PHI); KIAMCO Warren (PHI)	9
MAUNG Maung (MYA); THU Aung Moe (MYA)	8
DO Hoang Quan (VIE); NGUYEN Anh Tuan (VIE)	9

Final; 7 June
BIADO Carlo (PHI); KIAMCO Warren (PHI)	9
DO Hoang Quan (VIE); NGUYEN Anh Tuan (VIE)	6

==== 1 cushion carom ====
Preliminary; 6 June
Hasan Rudy (INA)	100
Oo Aung San (MYA)	59

Quarterfinal; 6 - 7 June
Ma Minh Cam (VIE)	100
Suwannasingh Suriya (THA)	27
Hasan Rudy (INA)	91
Reyes Efren (PHI)	100
Dela Cruz Francisco (PHI)	100
Naing Ko Ko (MYA)	39
Punyawee Thongchai (THA)	34
Tran Phi Hung (VIE)	100

Semifinal; 8 June
Ma Minh Cam (VIE)	100
Reyes Efren (PHI)	84
Dela Cruz Francisco (PHI)	87
Tran Phi Hung (VIE)	100

Final; 9 June
Ma Minh Cam (VIE)	92
Tran Phi Hung (VIE)	100

== Medal table ==
* Host nation (Singapore)

Rank	Nation	Gold	Silver	Bronze	Total
1	Philippines (PHI)	3	1	5	9
2	Singapore (SIN)*	2	1	3	6
3	Malaysia (MAS)	2	0	0	2
4	Myanmar (MYA)	1	4	3	8
5	Vietnam (VIE)	1	3	3	7
6	Thailand (THA)	1	1	5	7
7	Indonesia (INA)	0	0	1	1
Totals (7 entries)		10	10	20	40
