= Philippines at the 2015 SEA Games =

Philippines at the 2015 Southeast Asian Games
- IOC code: PHI
- NOC: Philippine Olympic Committee
- Website: www.olympic.ph (in English)

in Singapore
- Competitors: 466 in 35 sports
- Flag bearer: Alyssa Valdez (volleyball)
- Officials: 136
- Medals Ranked 6th: Gold 29 Silver 36 Bronze 66 Total 131

Southeast Asian Games appearances (overview)
- 1977; 1979; 1981; 1983; 1985; 1987; 1989; 1991; 1993; 1995; 1997; 1999; 2001; 2003; 2005; 2007; 2009; 2011; 2013; 2015; 2017; 2019; 2021; 2023; 2025; 2027; 2029

The Philippines competed at the 28th Southeast Asian Games from 5 to 16 June 2015. The Philippines contingent was composed of 472 athletes and 136 sporting officials participating in 35 out of the 36 sports.

== Preparation ==
Singapore National Olympic Committee trimmed the number of "Traditional" sports and prioritized sports that are staged in the Olympics to increase the level of competition among nations in key sports. 24 of the 36 sports played in this edition will be Olympic Sports.

The Philippines were eyeing for a decent finish in this edition of the Southeast Asian Games after a finish of 7th place in 2013, its worst finish since joining the biennial event. After fielding 210 athletes in 2013, Philippines Sports Commission and Philippines Olympic Committee chose "Quantity over Quality" to give the athletes the opportunity to not only bring home medals but also gain their needed experience in competing against the best of the best in Southeast Asia.

According to Chef-de-mission Julian Camacho, while the PSC goes for quantity they will still prioritize quality as well as young and upcoming athletes. Some National Sports Association must shoulder their expenses, should they win a medal their expenses will be reimbursed. PSC is confident that the Philippines will surpass their 2013 showing. Camacho predicted around 40 to 50 Gold medals. "The goal is to improve our finish in 2013 in Myanmar - whether it's sixth, fifth, fourth or higher," Camacho said.

POC chose Alyssa Valdez from the women's Volleyball to carry the flag. POC also considered 2014 Asian Games Silver Medalist and wushu specialist Daniel Parantac; however, he had an event that was held on the same day as the opening ceremony. Valdez becomes the first non medalist, as well as the first athlete from Volleyball, to lift the flag in the opening ceremonies of the biennial event.

POC is also considered to send the men's floorball Team. Singapore National Olympic Committee offered to shoulder all the expenses should the POC agree to send the Floorball Team. The POC sent the men's and women's national team to compete at the games but the latter were withdrew. Currently, there are only 3 NOC to play in women's floorball, SEA Games rule is that there should be at least 4 participating nations in a sport to make the sport competitive.

== Medalists ==
=== Gold ===
No.	Medal	Name	Sport	Event	Date
1	Gold	Maria Claire Adorna	Triathlon	Women's Triathlon	6 June
2	Gold	Nikko Bryan Huelgas	Triathlon	Men's Triathlon	7 June
3	Gold	Alexander Vincent Aronson; Justin Coveney; Andrew Stephen Everingham; Christopher Hitch; Gareth Leslie Holgate; Jake Gerald Letts; Patrice Davide Louis Olivier; Benjamin Joshua Saunders; Matthew Donato Saunders; Oliver Joseph Saunders; Andrei Tiffboards|Andrei Fitz Tiffboards; Andrew James Wolff; Vincent Francis Young	Rugby 7's	Men's team	7 June
4	Gold	Daniel Parantac	Wushu	Men's taijijian	7 June
5	Gold	Carlo Biado; Warren Kiamco	Billiards	Men's 9 Ball Doubles	7 June
6	Gold	Kiyomi Watanabe	Judo	Women's 63kg	7 June
7	Gold	Elvie Baldivino	Shooting	Women's Precision Pistol Individual	8 June
8	Gold	Caleb John Stuart	Athletics	Men's hammer throw	9 June
9	Gold	Chezka Centeno	Billiards	Women's 9-Ball Singles	9 June
10	Gold	Reyland Capellan	Gymnastics	Men's floor Exercise	9 June
11	Gold	Eric Shauwn Cray	Athletics	Men's 100m	9 June
12	Gold	Kaya Anise Richardson	Athletics	Women's 100m	9 June
13	Gold	Josie Gabuco	Boxing	Women's 48kg	10 June
14	Gold	Dennis Orcollo	Billiards	Men's 9 ball pool singles	10 June
15	Gold	Ian Clark Bautista	Boxing	Men's 52kg	10 June
16	Gold	Mario Fernandez	Boxing	Men's 56kg	10 June
17	Gold	Junel Catancio	Boxing	Men's 60kg	10 June
18	Gold	Eumir Felix Marcial	Boxing	Men's 69kg	10 June
19	Gold	Eric Shauwn Cray	Athletics	Men's 400m hurdles	10 June
20	Gold	Isidro Abello; Sonny Boy Acuna; Emerson Atilano; Denmark Bathan; Orlando Binarao; Oscar Bradshaw IV; Jasper Cabrera; Edmer Del Socorro; Vermon Diaz; Jeffry Hardillo; Ben Maravilles; Gregorio Marquez; William Jess Mendoza; Anthony Olaez; Saxon Omandac; Joseph Orillana; Apolonio Rosales	Softball	Men's team	10 June
21	Gold	Lorna Adorable; Francesca Altomonte; Veronica Belleza; Annalie Benjamen; Rizza Bernardino; Garnet Agnes Blando; Shaira Damasing; Luzviminda Embudo; Marlyn Francisco; Florabele Pabiania; Maria Celestine Palma; Elma Parohinog; Kriska Piad; Cristy Joy Roa; Queeny Sabobo; Angelie Ursabia; Arianne Vallestero	Softball	Women's team	10 June
22	Gold	Marella Salamat	Cycling	Individual Time Trial	11 June
23	Gold	Dustin Jacob Mella; Raphael Enrico Mella; Rodolfo Reyes Jr.	Taekwondo	Men's team poomsae	12 June
24	Gold	Christopher Ulboc Jr.	Athletics	Men's 3000m Steeplechase	12 June
25	Gold	Ridgely Balladares; Rommel Chavez; Richly Magsanay	Sailing	Men's Keelboat Match Racing	14 June
26	Gold	Samuel Thomas Harper Morrison	Taekwondo	Men's 68kg	14 June
27	Gold	Pauline Louise Lopez	Taekwondo	Women's 57kg	14 June
28	Gold	Treat Conrad Huey; Denise Dy	Tennis	Mixed doubles	14 June
29	Gold	Kiefer Ravena; Troy Rosario; Scottie Thompson; Baser Amer; Glenn Khobuntin; Almond Vosotros; Norbert Torres; Marcus Douthit; Mac Belo; Jio Jalalon; Kevin Ferrer; Prince Rivero	Basketball	Men's team	15 June

=== Silver ===
No.	Medal	Name	Sport	Event	Date
1	Silver	Justine Gail Tinio	Fencing	Women's individual Foil	3 June
2	Silver	Harlene Raguin	Fencing	Women's individual Epée	4 June
3	Silver	Richard Gonzales	Table Tennis	Men's singles	4 June
4	Silver	Kim Mangrobang	Triathlon	Women's Triathlon	6 June
5	Silver	Norlence Ardee Catolico; John Keithly Chan; Daniel Parantac	Wushu	Men's Duel Event - Weapons	6 June
6	Silver	Mary Joy Tabal	Athletics	Women's Marathon	7 June
7	Silver	Harlene Raguin; Hanniel Abella; Anna Gabriella Estimada; Keren Pangilinan	Fencing	Women's team Épée	7 June
8	Silver	Nathaniel Perez; Wilfred Richard Curioso; Brenan Wayne Louie; Emerson Segui	Fencing	Men's team Foil	7 June
9	Silver	Daniel Parantac	Wushu	Men's taijiquan	8 June
10	Silver	Elvie Baldivino; Carmelita Guillermo; Franchette Shayne Quiroz	Shooting	Women's precision pistol team	8 June
11	Silver	Francisco Solis	Wushu	Men's sanda 60 kg	8 June
12	Silver	Thornton Quieney Lou Sayan; Alieson Ken Omengan; Spencer Bahod	Wushu	Men's Duel – Barehand	8 June
13	Silver	Rubilen Amit	Billiards	Women's 9 Ball Singles	9 June
14	Silver	Ernest John Obiena	Athletics	Men's pole vault	9 June
15	Silver	Ava Lorein Verdeflor	Gymnastics	Women's uneven bars	9 June
16	Silver	Anna Clarice Patrimonio; Katharina Lehnert; Khim Iglupas; Denise Dy	Tennis	Women's team	9 June
17	Silver	Ridgely Balladares; Rommel Chavez; Richly Magsanay	Sailing	Men's Fleetracing Keelboat	9 June
18	Silver	Irish Magno	Boxing	Women's 51kg	10 June
19	Silver	Nesthy Petecio	Boxing	Women's 54kg	10 June
20	Silver	Rogen Ladon	Boxing	Women's 49kg	10 June
21	Silver	Jesson Ramil Cid	Athletics	Men's Decathlon	10 June
22	Silver	Kayla Anise Richardson	Athletics	Women's 200m	10 June
23	Silver	Jesson Ramil Cid	Athletics	Men's Decathlon	10 June
24	Silver	Mervin Guarte	Athletics	Athletics	11 June
25	Silver	Edgardo Alejan Jr. Archland Christian Bangsit; Ryan Bigyan; Joan Caido	Athletics	Men's 4×400m Relay	11 June
26	Silver	Joshua Hall	Athletics	Men's 50m breaststroke	11 June
27	Silver	Jessie Lacuna	Athletics	Men's 400m freestyle	11 June
28	Silver	Rinna Babanto	Taekwondo	Women's individual poomsae	12 June
29	Silver	Irene Therese Bermejo	Taekwondo	Women's 46kg	12 June 2015
30	Silver	Francis Aaron Agojo	Taekwondo	Men's 58kg	13 June 2015
31	Silver	Lester Troy Tayong; Emerson Villena	Sailing	Men's 470	13 June
32	Silver	Jeson Patrombon; Ruben Gonzales Jr.	Tennis	Men's doubles	13 June
33	Silver	Amaya Amparo Cojuangco	Archery	Women's individual compound	14 June
34	Silver	Nestor Cordova	Rowing	Men's singles Sculls (1000 m)	14 June
35	Silver	Denise Dy; Katharina Lehnert	Tennis	Women's doubles	14 June
36	Silver	Jason Huerte; Emmanuel Escote; Rheyjey Ortouste	Sepak Takraw	Men's doubles	15 June

=== Bronze ===
No.	Medal	Name	Sport	Event	Date
1	Bronze	Nathaniel Perez	Fencing	Men's individual foil	4 June
2	Bronze	Hermie Macaranas	Canoeing	Men's C1 1000m	6 June
3	Bronze	Hermie Macaranas; Ojay Fuentes	Canoeing	Men's C2 1000m	6 June
4	Bronze	Raquel Almencion; Patricia Ann Bustamante; Maribeth Caranto; Rosalyn Esguerra; Rea Glore; Glaiza Liwag; Maria Eucelia Manatad; Ella Fe Niuda	Traditional Boat Race	Women's 200m (6 crew)	6 June
5	Bronze	Jayson Valdez	Shooting	Men's 10m Air Rifle	6 June
6	Bronze	Helen Dawa	Judo	Women's 52kg	6 June
7	Bronze	Gilbert Ramirez	Judo	Men's 73kg	6 June
8	Bronze	Wilhelmina Lozada; Keren Pangilinan; Justine Gail Tinio; Anna Gabriella Estimada	Fencing	Women's team Foil	6 June
9	Bronze	Lamberto Espiritu; Jerome Jovanne Morales; Mar Udan	Shooting	Men's precision pistol team	7 June
10	Bronze	Rosemarie Dela Cruz; Kaye Llanie Honoras; Helena Roxanne Indigne; Eloisa Jasmine Jordan; Ada Milby; Aiumi Ono; Anna Beatrix Pacis; Rassiel Sales; Madille Salinas; Angella Camille San Juan; Sylvia Tudoc; Dixie Star Yu	Rugby Sevens	Women's team	7 June
11	Bronze	Rachelle Arellano; Sofia Isabel Gonzalez; Elizabeth Leduc; Maria Cristina Onofre; Ava Lorein Verdeflor	Gymnastics	Women's team	7 June
12	Bronze	Jasmine Alkhaldi	Swimming	Women's 50m butterfly	7 June
13	Bronze	Roxanne Ashley Yu	Swimming	Women's 200m backstroke	7 June
14	Bronze	Joshua Hall	Swimming	Men's 100m backstroke	7 June
15	Bronze	Clement Tabugara Jr.	Wushu	Men's sanda 65kg	7 June
16	Bronze	Efren Reyes	Billiards	Men's 1 Cushion Carom	8 June
17	Bronze	Michael Angelo Mengorio	Billiards	Men's snooker singles	8 June
18	Bronze	Riza Pasuit	Boxing	Women's 57kg	8 June
19	Bronze	Francisco dela Cruz	Billiards	Men's 1 Cushion Carom	8 June
20	Bronze	Jeson Patrombon; Treat Conrad Huey; Francis Casey Alcantara; Ruben Gonzales Jr.	Tennis	Men's team	8 June
21	Bronze	Jasmine Alkhaldi	Swimming	Women's 100m freestyle	8 June
22	Bronze	Wilfredo Lopez	Boxing	Men's 75kg	8 June
23	Bronze	Jessie Lacuna	Swimming	Men's 200m butterfly	8 June
24	Bronze	Hermie Macaranas	Canoeing	Men's C1 200m	9 June
25	Bronze	Hermie Macaranas; Ojay Fuentes	Canoeing	Men's C2 200m	9 June
26	Bronze	Carlo Biado	Billiards	Men's 9 Ball Singles	9 June
27	Bronze	Alvin Barbero; Michael Angelo Mengorio	Billiards	Men's snooker doubles	9 June
28	Bronze	Jasmine Alkhaldi	Swimming	Women's 200m freestyle	9 June
29	Bronze	Roxanne Ashley Yu	Swimming	Women's 100m backstroke	9 June
30	Bronze	Reyland Capellan	Gymnastics	Men's vault	10 June
31	Bronze	Marestella Torres	Athletics	Women's long jump	10 June
32	Bronze	Janry Ubas	Athletics	Men's Decathlon	10 June
33	Bronze	Rosie Villarito	Athletics	Women's javelin throw	10 June
34	Bronze	Jemyca Aribado	Squash	Women's singles	10 June
35	Bronze	Jasmine Alkhaldi; Hannah Dato; Roxanne Ashley Yu; Imelda Corazon Wistey	Swimming	Women's 4 × 100 m Medley	10 June 2015
36	Bronze	Jessie Lacuna	Swimming	Men's 200 m Medley	10 June
37	Bronze	Lara Posadas; Alexis Marie Sy; Maria Arles	Bowling	Women's team Trios	11 June
38	Bronze	Riezelle Buenaventura	Squash	Women's pole vault	11 June
39	Bronze	Patrick Unso	Athletics	Men's 100m hurdles	11 June
40	Bronze	Jasmine Alkhaldi	Swimming	Women's 50m freestyle	11 June
41	Bronze	Jasmine Alkhaldi	Swimming	Women's 100m butterfly	11 June
42	Bronze	Lara Posadas; Alexis Marie Sy; Maria Arles; Liza Clutario; Liza Del Rosario; Krizziah Tabora	Bowling	Women's teams of five	12 June
43	Bronze	Eric Ang; Hagen Alexander Topacio; Miguel David Laperal	Shooting	Men's Trap Team	12 June
44	Bronze	Ricky Espinola; Robert Garcia; David Pelino	Squash	Men's team	12 June
45	Bronze	Jenar Torillos	Taekwondo	Men's 54kg	12 June
46	Bronze	Mark Howard Griffin	Waterski	Men's Wakeboard	12 June
47	Bronze	Maiquel Jawn Selga	Waterski	Women's Wakeboard	12 June
48	Bronze	Jeson Patrombon	Tennis	Men's singles	12 June
49	Bronze	Katharina Lehnert	Tennis	Women's singles	12 June
50	Bronze	Regie Reznan Pabriga; Rhemwil Catana; John John Bobier; Ronsited Gabayeron; John Jeffrey Morcillos	Sepak Takraw	Men's regu	12 June
51	Bronze	Edgardo Alejan Jr.	Athletics	Men's 400m	12 June
52	Bronze	Donovant Arriola Jr.	Athletics	Men's Loong Jump	12 June
53	Bronze	Jessica Lynn Barnard	Athletics	Women's 3000m Steeplechase	12 June
54	Bronze	Narcisa Atienza	Athletics	Women's Heptathlon	12 June
55	Bronze	Francis Casey Alcantara; Treat Conrad Huey	Tennis	Men's doubles	13 June
56	Bronze	Alshamier Ibnohasim	Pencak Silat	Men's Tanding 50 kg	13 June
57	Bronze	Clyde Joy Baria	Pencak Silat	Women's Tanding 60kg	13 June
58	Bronze	Juanillio Ballesta II	Pencak Silat	Men's Tanding 85kg	13 June
59	Bronze	Levita Ronna Ilao	Taekwondo	Women's 49kg	13 June
60	Bronze	Paul Marton dela Cruz; Delfin Anthony Adriano; Earl Benjamin Yap	Archery	Men's team compound	14 June
61	Bronze	Amaya Amparo Cojuangco; Earl Benjamin Yap	Archery	Mixed team compound	14 June
62	Bronze	Amaya Amparo Cojuangco; Joann Tabanag; Jennifer Chan	Archery	Women's team compound	14 June
63	Bronze	Edgar Ilas; Benjamin Tolentino	Rowing	Men's lightweight double sculls (1000m)	14 June
64	Bronze	Maiquel Jawn Selga; Mark Howard Griffin; Angelo Louise Linao	Water skiing	Mixed Team	14 June
65	Bronze	Ricky Espinola; David Pelino	Squash	Men's Jumbo Doubles	15 June
66	Bronze	Ronel Estanislao; Philip Joper Escueta	Badminton	Men's doubles	15 June

=== Multiple ===
Name	Sport	Gold	Silver	Bronze	Total
Eric Shauwn Cray	Athletics	2	0	0	2
Daniel Parantac	Wushu	1	2	0	3
Denise Dy	Tennis	1	2	0	3
Kayla Richardson	Athletics	1	1	0	2
Ridgely Balladares	Sailing	1	1	0	2
Rommel Chavez	Sailing	1	1	0	2
Richly Magsanay	Sailing	1	1	0	2
Elvie Baldivino	Shooting	1	1	0	2
Treat Conrad Huey	Tennis	1	0	2	3
Carlo Biado	Billiards and Snooker	1	0	1	2
Reyland Capellan	Gymnastics	1	0	1	2
Katharina Lehnert	Tennis	0	2	1	3
Mervin Guarte	Athletics	0	2	0	2
Harlene Raguin	Fencing	0	2	0	2
Amaya Amparo Cojuangco	Archery	0	1	2	3
Jessie Lacuna	Swimming	0	1	2	3
Jeson Patrombon	Tennis	0	1	2	3
Justine Gail Tinio	Fencing	0	1	1	2
Anna Gabriella Estimada	Fencing	0	1	1	2
Keren Pangilinan	Fencing	0	1	1	2
Nathaniel Perez	Fencing	0	1	1	2
Ava Lorein Verdeflor	Gymnastics	0	1	1	2
Edgardo Alejan Jr.	Athletics	0	1	1	2
Ruben Gonzales Jr.	Tennis	0	1	1	2
Joshua Hall	Swimming	0	1	1	2
Jasmine Alkhaldi	Swimming	0	0	6	6
Hermie Macaranas	Canoeing	0	0	4	4
Roxanne Ashley Yu	Swimming	0	0	3	3
Ojay Fuentes	Canoeing	0	0	2	2
Michael Angelo Mengorio	Billiards and Snooker	0	0	2	2
Francis Casey Alcantara	Tennis	0	0	2	2
Earl Benjamin Yap	Archery	0	0	2	2
Maria Arles	Bowling	0	0	2	2
Lara Posadas	Bowling	0	0	2	2
Maria Alexis Sy	Bowling	0	0	2	2
Ricky Espinola	Squash	0	0	2	2
David Pelino	Squash	0	0	2	2
Mark Howard Griffin	Waterskiing	0	0	2	2
Maiquel Jawn Selga	Waterskiing	0	0	2	2

== Competitors ==
Sport	Men	Women	Total
Diving	2	2	4
Swimming	5	7	12
Synchronized swimming	0	2	2
Water polo	13	13	26
Archery	8	8	16
Athletics	24	12	36
Badminton	4	0	4
Basketball	12	12	24
Billiards and snooker	10	2	12
Bowling	6	6	12
Boxing	6	4	10
Canoeing	3	0	3
Cycling	6	2	8
Equestrian	0	4	4
Fencing	10	9	19
Floorball	18	0	18
Football	20	0	20
Golf	4	3	7
Gymnastics–Artistic	4	5	9
Judo	4	4	8
Netball	0	10	10
Pencak silat	3	2	5
Pétanque	1	2	3
Rowing	6	1	7
Rugby sevens	12	12	24
Sailing	8	5	13
Sepak takraw	8	0	8
Shooting	10	5	15
Softball	17	17	34
Squash	3	1	4
Table tennis	3	2	5
Taekwondo	6	6	12
Tennis	4	4	8
Traditional boat race	14	8	22
Triathlon	2	2	4
Volleyball	12	12	24
Waterskiing	2	1	3
Wushu	9	3	12
Others	10	-5	5
Total	289	183	472

== Medal summary ==
=== By sports ===
Sport	1st place, gold medalist(s)	2nd place, silver medalist(s)	3rd place, bronze medalist(s)	Total
Athletics	5	7	9	21
Boxing	5	3	2	10
Taekwondo	3	3	2	8
Billiards and Snooker	3	1	5	9
Triathlon	2	1	0	3
Softball	2	0	0	2
Wushu	1	4	1	6
Tennis	1	3	4	8
Sailing	1	2	0	3
Shooting	1	1	3	5
Gymnastics	1	1	2	4
Judo	1	0	2	3
Rugby Sevens	1	0	1	2
Basketball	1	0	0	1
Cycling	1	0	0	1
Fencing	0	4	2	6
Swimming	0	2	11	13
Archery	0	1	3	4
Rowing	0	1	1	2
Sepak Takraw	0	1	1	2
Table Tennis	0	1	0	1
Canoeing	0	0	4	4
Pencak Silat	0	0	3	3
Squash	0	0	3	3
Waterski	0	0	3	3
Bowling	0	0	2	2
Badminton	0	0	1	1
Traditional Boat Race	0	0	1	1
Total	29	36	66	131

=== By date ===
Medals by date
Day	Date	1st place, gold medalist(s)	2nd place, silver medalist(s)	3rd place, bronze medalist(s)	Total
–3	2 June	0	0	0	0
–2	3 June	0	1	0	1
–1	4 June	0	2	1	3
0	5 June	0	0	0	0
1	6 June	1	2	7	10
2	7 June	5	3	7	15
3	8 June	1	4	8	13
4	9 June	5	5	6	16
5	10 June	9	6	7	22
6	11 June	1	4	5	10
7	12 June	2	2	13	16
8	13 June	0	3	5	8
9	14 June	4	3	5	12
10	15 June	1	1	2	4
11	16 June	0	0	0	0
Total		29	36	66	131

== Archery ==
=== Men's compound ===
Athlete	Event	Ranking Round		Round of 16	Quarterfinals	Semifinals	Final/BM	Rank
Athlete	Event	Score	Seed	Opposition Score	Opposition Score	Opposition Score	Opposition Score	Rank
Paul Marton dela Cruz	Individual	680	12	Did Not Advance				
Earl Benjamin Yap	Individual	696	3 Q	Pyae Sone (MYA); W 143 – 134	Sapriatno Sapriatno (INA); L 136 – 141	Did Not Advance		
Delfin Anthony Adriano	Individual	678	15	Did Not Advance				
Jose Ferdinand Adriano	Individual	689	5 Q	Shein Htet Kyaw (MYA); W 143 – 142	Zulfadhli Ruslan (MAS); L 133 – 137	Did Not Advance		
Paul Marton dela Cruz; Earl Benjamin Yap; Delfin Anthony Adriano; Jose Ferdinand Adriano	Team	2065	2	—N/a	Myanmar; W 224 – 214	Indonesia; L 230 – 235	Singapore; W 230 – 223	3rd place, bronze medalist(s)

=== Men's recurve ===
Athlete	Event	Ranking Round		Round of 16	Quarterfinals	Semifinals	Final/BM	Rank
Athlete	Event	Score	Seed	Opposition Score	Opposition Score	Opposition Score	Opposition Score	Rank
Luis Gabriel Moreno	Individual	645	5 Q	Natthapoom Phusawat (THA); L 2 – 6	Did Not Advance			
Florante Matan	Individual	626	17 Q	Muhammad Hanif Wijaya (INA); W 6 – 2	Natthapoom Phusawat (THA); L 1 – 7	Did Not Advance		
Mark Javier	Individual	616	23	Did Not Advance				
Zander Lee Reyes	Individual	588	27	Did Not Advance				
Luis Gabriel Moreno; Mark Javier; Florante Matan; Zander Lee Reyes	Team	1887	5	—N/a	Singapore; L 2 – 6	Did Not Advance		
Luis Gabriel Moreno; Rachelle Anne Dela Cruz	Mixed Team	1263	6	—N/a	Malaysia; L 2 – 6	Did Not Advance		

=== Women's compound ===
Athlete	Event	Ranking Round		Round of 16	Quarterfinals	Semifinals	Final/BM	Rank
Athlete	Event	Score	Seed	Opposition Score	Opposition Score	Opposition Score	Opposition Score	Rank
Amaya Paz-Cojuangco	Individual	682	2 Q	Yaw Sein Yah (MYA); W 143 – 132	Joan Chan-Tabanag (PHI); W 137 – 131	Nareumon Junsook (THA); W 141 – 135	Fatin Nurfatehah Mat Salleh (MAS); L 136 – 138	2nd place, silver medalist(s)
Joan Chan-Tabanag	Individual	668	9 Q	Sunee Detchokul (THA); W 139 – 137	Amaya Paz-Cojuangco (PHI); L 131 – 137	Did Not Advance		
Jennifer Chan	Individual	668	10	Did Not Advance				
Abigail Tindugan	Individual	661	15	Did Not Advance				
Amaya Paz-Cojuangco; Joan Chan-Tabanag; Jennifer Chan; Abigail Tindugan	Team	2018	2	—N/a	Laos; W 217 – 211	Thailand; L 224 – 225	Singapore; W 210 – 208	3rd place, bronze medalist(s)
Amaya Paz-Cojuangco; Earl Benjamin Yap	Mixed Team	1378	2	—N/a	Myanmar; W 154 – 145	Thailand; L 145 – 148	Indonesia; W 152 – 149	3rd place, bronze medalist(s)

=== Women's recurve ===
Athlete	Event	Ranking Round		Round of 16	Quarterfinals	Semifinals	Final/BM	Rank
Athlete	Event	Score	Seed	Opposition Score	Opposition Score	Opposition Score	Opposition Score	Rank
Rachelle Anne de la Cruz	Individual	618	10 Q	San Yu Htwe (MYA); W 7 – 1	Ika Yuliana Rochmawati (INA); W 6 – 5	Titik Kusumawardani (INA); L 5 – 6	Thi Thu Hien Le (VIE); L 4 – 6	4
Karylle Hongitan	Individual	612	12 Q	Shin Hui Loke (MAS); L 0 – 6	Did Not Advance			
Bianca Gotuaco	Individual	599	17	Did Not Advance				
Rachelle Anne de la Cruz; Karylle Honguitan; Bianca Gotuaco	Team	1829	4	—N/a	Malaysia; L 4 – 5	Did Not Advance		

== Athletics ==
=== Men's ===
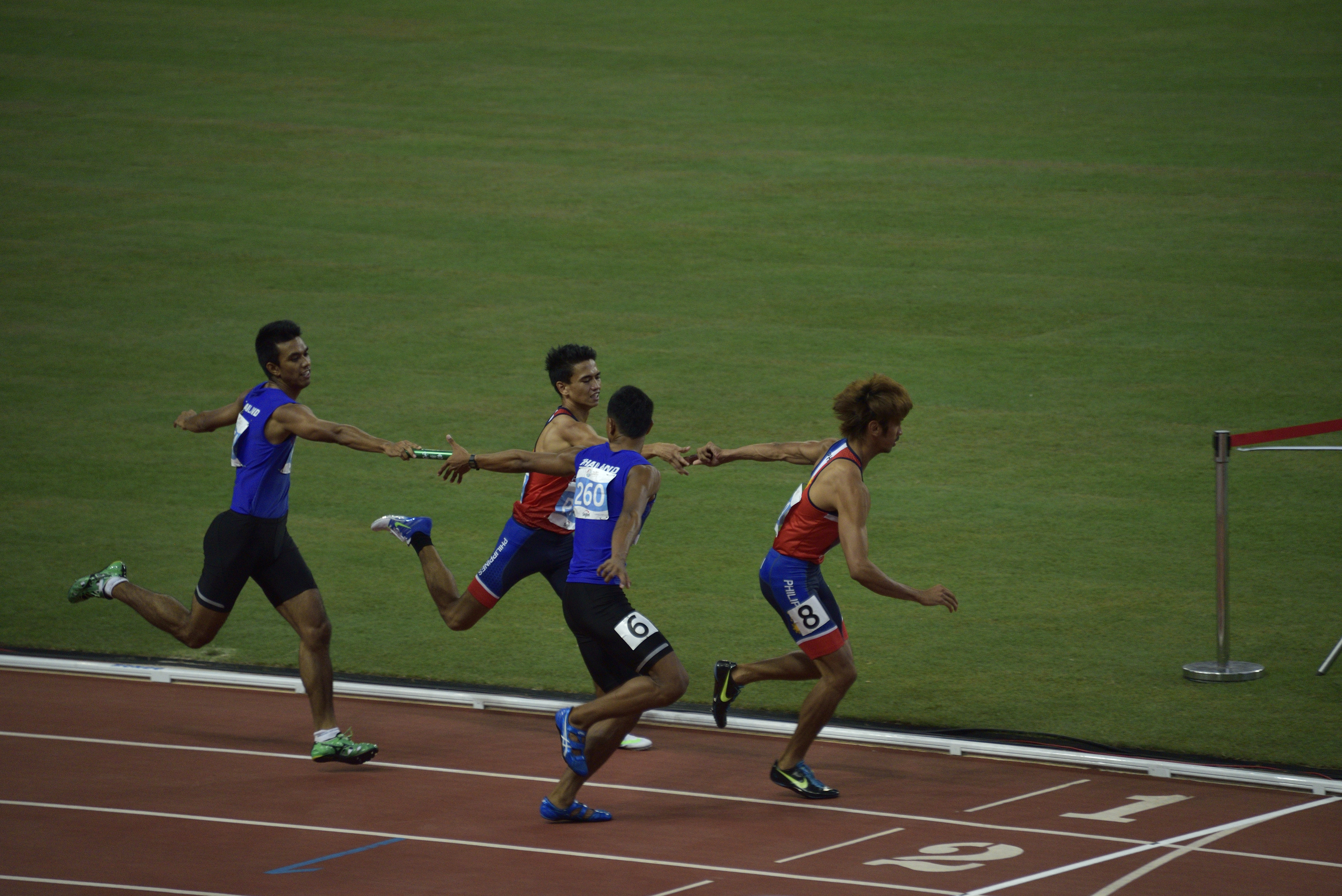
Filipino athletes (in blue) competing at the 4 × 400 m relay event

Athlete	Event	Heats			Final	
Athlete	Event	Heat	Time	Rank	Time	Rank
Eric Shauwn Cray	100 m	1	10.28	1 Q	10.25	1st place, gold medalist(s)
Eric Shauwn Cray	400 m hurdles	—N/a			49.40	1st place, gold medalist(s)
Junrey Bano	400 m hurdles	—N/a			53.07	6
Rene Herrera	3000 m Steeplechase	—N/a			9:52.38	10
Christopher Ulboc Jr.	3000 m Steeplechase	—N/a			8:59.07	1st place, gold medalist(s)
Mervin Guarte	1500 m	—N/a			3:48.06	2nd place, silver medalist(s)
Mervin Guarte	800 m	—N/a			1:51.47	2nd place, silver medalist(s)
Wenlie Maulas	800 m	—N/a			1:54.38	7
Archand Christian Bagsit	400 m	1	48.78	4	Did Not Advance	
Edgardo Alejan Jr.	400 m	2	47.62	1 Q	47.08	3rd place, bronze medalist(s)
Patrick Ma. Unso	110 m hurdles	1	14.30	4 Q	14.12	3rd place, bronze medalist(s)
Clinton Kingsley Bautista	110 m hurdles	2	14.35	4 Q	15.01	7
Eduardo Buenavista	Marathon	—N/a			2:39:26	5
Rafael Poliquit Jr.	Marathon	—N/a			Did Not Finish	
Edgardo Alejan Jr. Archand Christian Bagsit; Joan Caido; Ryan Bigyan	4 × 400 m Relay	—N/a			3:06.84	2nd place, silver medalist(s)

Athlete	Event	Final	
Athlete	Event	Result	Rank
Arniel Ferrera	Hammer Throw	60.08	4
Caleb John Christian Stuart	Hammer Throw	65.63	1st place, gold medalist(s)
Caleb John Christian Stuart	Shot put	15.75	4
Caleb John Christian Stuart	Discus Throw	49.37	4
Henry Dagmil	Long Jump	7.28	6
Donovant Arriola Jr.	Long Jump	7.51	3rd place, bronze medalist(s)
Ernest John Obiena	Pole Vault	5.25	2nd place, silver medalist(s)
Janry Ubas	Pole Vault	No Mark	
Tyler Christian Ruiz	High Jump	2.08	5
Mark Harry Diones	Triple Jump	15.87	4

Athlete	Event	100m	LJ	SP	HJ	400 m	110m H	DT	PV	JV	1500m	Total	Rank
Janry Ubas	Decathlon	11.10; 838	7.45; 922	10.65; 525	2.01; 813	52.39; 708	16.01; 732	27.63; 418	4.70; 819	49.81; 586	5:22.88; 435	6796	3rd place, bronze medalist(s)
Jesson Ramil Cid	Decathlon	10.82; 901	7.02; 818	11.77; 592	1.83; 653	49.07; 858	15.08; 840	33.98; 543	4.30; 702	45.60; 524	4:47.40; 634	7065	2nd place, silver medalist(s)

=== Women's ===
Athlete	Event	Heats			Final	
Athlete	Event	Heat	Time	Rank	Time	Rank
Kayla Anise Richardson	100 m	1	11.70	2 Q	11.76	1st place, gold medalist(s)
Kayla Anise Richardson	200 m	1	23.67	1 Q	23.71	2nd place, silver medalist(s)
Princess Joy Griffey	100 m	2	11.83	2 Q	12.00	5
Princess Joy Griffey	200 m	Did Not Start				
Mary Grace Delos Santos	10000 m	—N/a			38:40.26	7
Mary Joy Tabal	Marathon	—N/a			3:04:39	2nd place, silver medalist(s)
Jessica Lynn Barnard	3000 m Steeplechase	—N/a			10:36.90	3rd place, bronze medalist(s)
Kayla Anise Richardson; Princess Joy Griffey; Kyla Ashley Richardson; Katherine Khay Santos	4 × 100 m Relay	—N/a			45.64	6

Athlete	Event	Final	
Athlete	Event	Result	Rank
Riezel Buenaventura	Pole Vault	3.60	3rd place, bronze medalist(s)
Marestella Torres	Long Jump	6.41	3rd place, bronze medalist(s)
Katherine Khay Santos	Long Jump	6.40	4
Narcisa Atienza	Shot Put	11.61	5
Evalyn Palabrica	Javelin Throw	47.49	4
Rosie Villarito	Javelin Throw	48.44	3rd place, bronze medalist(s)

Athlete	Event	100m H	HJ	SP	200 m	LJ	JT	800m	Total	Rank
Narcisa Atienza	Heptathlon	15.23; 811	1.69; 842	11.72; 643	27.06; 707	4.78; 500	39.29; 654	2:34.18; 641	4798	3rd place, bronze medalist(s)

== Badminton ==
Athlete	Event	Round of 16	Quarter Final	Semi Final	Final	Rank
Athlete	Event	Opposition Result	Opposition Result	Opposition Result	Opposition Result	Rank
Philip Joper Escueta; Ronel Estanislao	Doubles	Hendra Wijaya (SIN); Hee Yong Kai Terry (SIN); W 2 – 0	Kanora Nguon (CAM); Yong Vannak Teav (CAM); W 2 – 0	Marcus Fernaldi (INA); Kevin Sanjaya (INA); L 0 – 2	Did Not Advance	3rd place, bronze medalist(s)
Peter Gabriel Magnaye; Paul Jefferson Vivas	Doubles	Kosal Yan (CAM); Phirom Ein (CAM); W 2 – 0	Ricky Karandasuwardi (INA); Angga Pratama (INA); L 0 – 2	Did Not Advance		

== Basketball ==
=== Men ===
Team

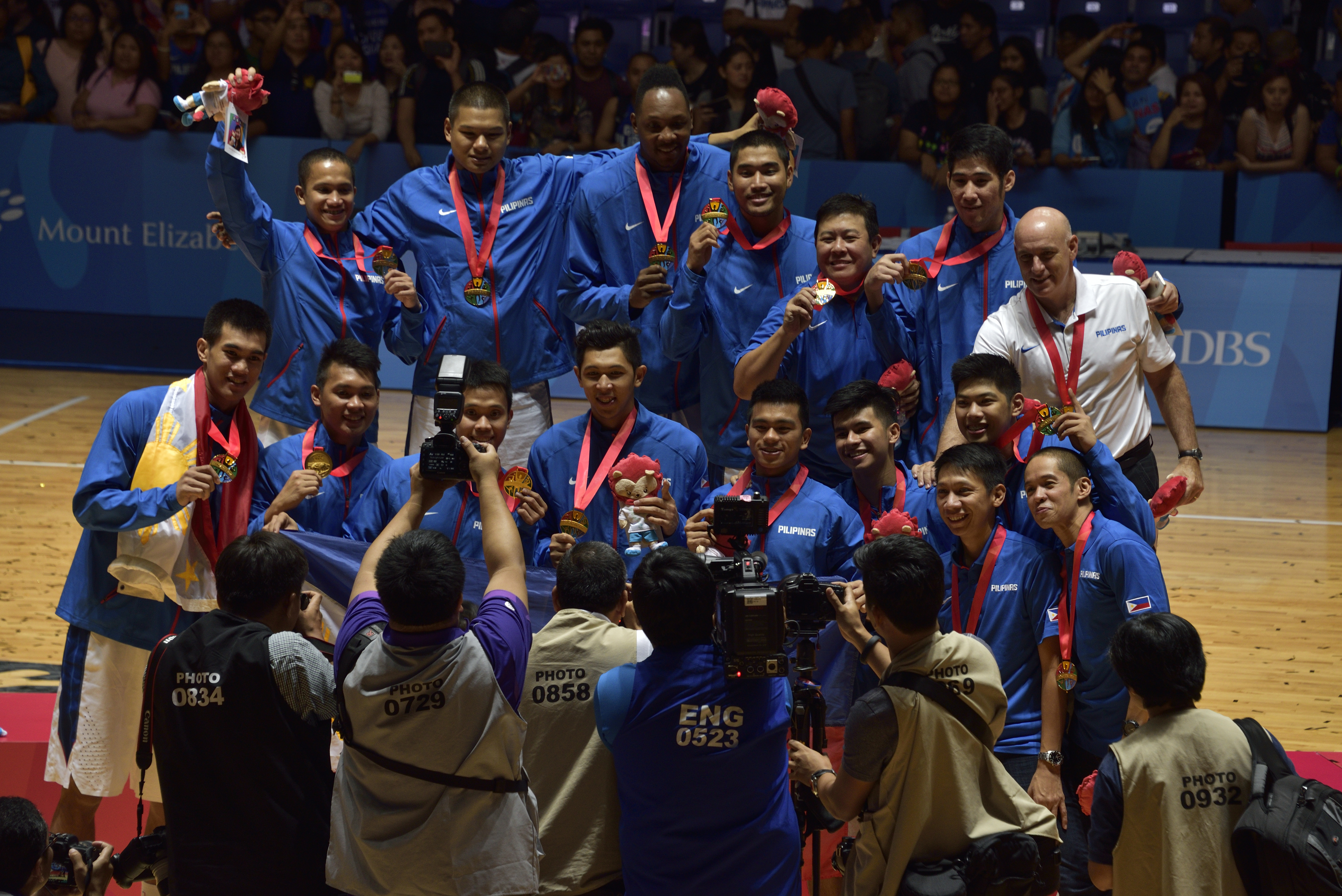
The Philippine men's national basketball team

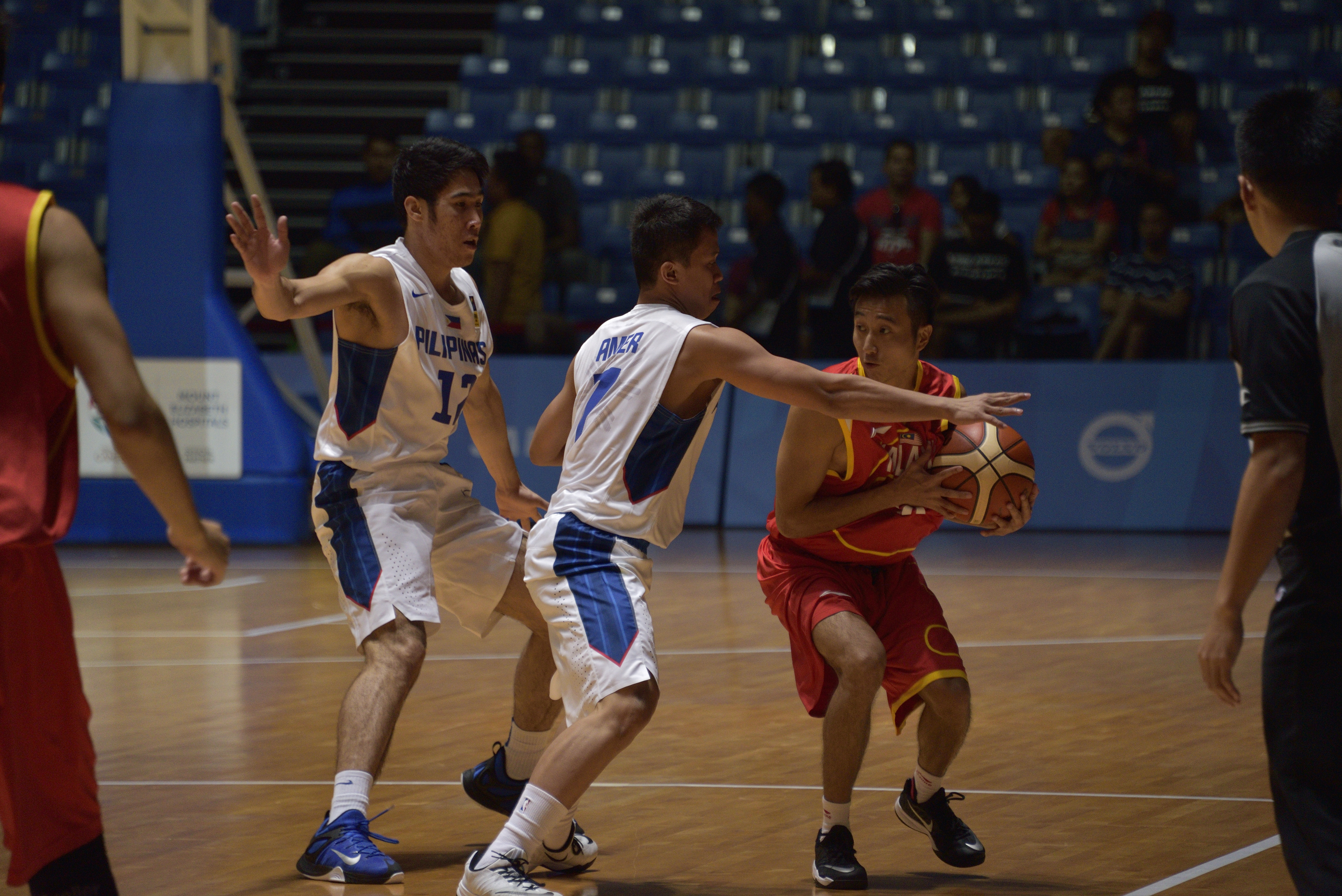
Philippines v. Malaysia; June 11, 2015

Philippines men's national basketball team - 2015 SEA Games Roster roster
Players
Coaches

Pos.	No.	Name	Age – Date of birth	Height	Club	Ctr.
G	4	Kiefer Ravena (C)	21 – 27 October 1993	1.83 m (6 ft 0 in)	Ateneo Blue Eagles	(Philippines)
F/C	5	Troy Rosario	23 – 20 January 1992	2.01 m (6 ft 7 in)	Hapee Fresh Fighters	(Philippines)
G	6	Scottie Thompson	21 – 12 July 1993	1.86 m (6 ft 1 in)	Hapee Fresh Fighters	(Philippines)
G	7	Baser Amer	22 – 29 September 1992	1.77 m (5 ft 10 in)	San Beda Red Lions	(Philippines)
F	8	Glenn Khobuntin	22 – 19 February 1993	1.93 m (6 ft 4 in)	Jumbo Plastic Linoleum Giants	(Philippines)
G	9	Almond Vosotros	25 – 26 January 1990	1.77 m (5 ft 10 in)	Cebuana Lhuillier Gems	(Philippines)
C	10	Norbert Torres	25 – 20 January 1990	1.98 m (6 ft 6 in)	Cebuana Lhuillier Gems	(Philippines)
C	11	Marcus Douthit	35 – 15 April 1980	2.10 m (6 ft 11 in)	Blackwater Elite	(Philippines)
F	12	Mac Belo	20 – 30 December 1994	1.91 m (6 ft 3 in)	Hapee Fresh Fighters	(Philippines)
G	13	Jio Jalalon	22 – 2 August 1992	1.77 m (5 ft 10 in)	Arellano Chiefs	(Philippines)
F	14	Kevin Ferrer	22 – 26 March 1993	1.93 m (6 ft 4 in)	Cebuana Lhuillier Gems	(Philippines)
F	15	Prince Rivero	20 – 19 February 1995	1.90 m (6 ft 3 in)	De La Salle Green Archers	(Philippines)

Head coach

- (United States) Tab Baldwin

Assistant coach(es)

- (Philippines) Nash Racela
- (Philippines) Jimmy Alapag

Legend

- (C) Team captain
- Club – describes last
  club before the tournament

Team	Preliminary round		Semifinal	Final	Rank
Team	Group A	Rank	Semifinal	Final	Rank
Philippines	Indonesia; W 81 – 52	1 Q	Thailand; W 80 – 75	Indonesia; W 72 – 64	1st place, gold medalist(s)
Philippines	Malaysia; W 100 – 48	1 Q	Thailand; W 80 – 75	Indonesia; W 72 – 64	1st place, gold medalist(s)
Philippines	Timor-Leste; W 126 – 21	1 Q	Thailand; W 80 – 75	Indonesia; W 72 – 64	1st place, gold medalist(s)

=== Women ===
Team

Philippines women's national basketball team - 2015 SEA Games roster
Players
Coaches

Pos.	No.	Name	Age – Date of birth	Height	Club
F	6	Shelley Anne Gupilan	23 – 14 July 1991	1.75 m (5 ft 9 in)	NU Lady Bulldogs	(Philippines)
F	14	Raiza Rose Palmera	24 – 21 November 1990	1.67 m (5 ft 6 in)	FEU Lady Tamaraws	(Philippines)
F	12	Merenciana Arayi	29 – 5 November 1985	1.93 m (6 ft 4 in)	Adamson Lady Falcons	(Philippines)
F	13	Cindy Resultay	24 – 31 December 1990	1.67 m (5 ft 6 in)	UE Lady Warriors	(Philippines)
F	9	Sofia Isabella Roman	21 – 24 May 1994	1.70 m (5 ft 7 in)	Dartmouth College Big Green	(Philippines)
G	7	Fria Bernardo	24 – 22 February 1991	1.65 m (5 ft 5 in)	Adamson Lady Falcons	(Philippines)
SG	8	Afril Bernardino	19 – 3 April 1996	1.72 m (5 ft 8 in)	NU Lady Bulldogs	(Philippines)
C	11	Danica Therese Jose	21 – 18 March 1994	1.82 m (6 ft 0 in)	Ateneo Lady Eagles	(Philippines)
C	4	Analyn Almazan	26 – 7 October 1988	1.78 m (5 ft 10 in)	Adamson Lady Falcons	(Philippines)
C	15	Clare Castro	18 – 13 January 1997	1.93 m (6 ft 4 in)	FEU Lady Tamaraws	(Philippines)
C	5	Allana May Lim	26 – 12 September 1988	1.67 m (5 ft 6 in)	FEU Lady Tamaraws	(Philippines)
C	10	Camille Sambile	23 – 24 April 1992	1.77 m (5 ft 10 in)	FEU Lady Tamaraws	(Philippines)

Head coach

- (Philippines) Patrick Aquino

Assistant coach(es)

- (Philippines) Julie Amos
- (Philippines) Paul Du
- (Philippines) Aries Dimaunahan

Team Manager

- (Philippines) Wilbert Loa

Legend

- (C) Team captain
- Club – describes last
  club before the tournament

Team	Game 1	Game 2	Game 3	Game 4	Game 5	Rank
Philippines	Thailand; L 57 – 62	Vietnam; W 100 – 55	Malaysia; W 74 – 63	Indonesia; L 56 – 61	Singapore; W 82 - 72	4

== Billiards and snooker ==
=== Men's ===
Athlete	Event	Round of 16	Quarterfinals	Semifinals	Final	
Athlete	Event	Opposition Result	Opposition Result	Opposition Result	Opposition Result	Rank
Efren Reyes	Men's 1 Cushion Carom	Bye	Rudy Hasan (INA); W 100 – 91	Minh Cam Ma (VIE); L 84 – 100	Did Not Advance	3rd place, bronze medalist(s)
Francisco Dela Cruz	Men's 1 Cushion Carom	Bye	Ko Ko Naing (MYA); W 100 – 39	Phi Hung Tran (VIE); L 87 – 100	Did Not Advance	3rd place, bronze medalist(s)
Alvin Barbero	Men's snooker singles	Ko Win Ko (MYA); L 1 – 4	Did Not Advance			
Michael Angelo Mengorio	Men's snooker singles	Sithideth Sakbieng (LAO); W 4 – 0	Chan Keng Kwang (SIN); W 4 – 3	Ko Htet (MYA); L 0 – 4	Did Not Advance	3rd place, bronze medalist(s)
Reynaldo Grandea	Men's English billiards singles	Hoai Nam Pham (VIE); L 1 – 3	Did Not Advance			
Jefrey Roda	Men's English billiards singles	Kyaw Oo (MYA); L 1 – 3	Did Not Advance			
Reynaldo Grandea	Men's English billiards singles (500)	Praprut Chaithanasakun (THA); L 32 – 500	Did Not Advance			
Jefrey Roda	Men's English billiards singles (500)	Yeo Teck Shin (SIN); L 228 – 501	Did Not Advance			
Reynaldo Grandea; Jefrey Roda	Men's English billiards doubles	—N/a	Singapore; L 0 – 3	Did Not Advance		
Michael Angelo Mengorio; Alvin Barbero	Men's snooker doubles	—N/a	Myanmar; W 3 – 0	Malaysia; L 0 – 3	Did Not Advance	3rd place, bronze medalist(s)
Dennis Orcollo	Men's 9-Ball Pool Singles	Aung Moe Thu (MYA); W 9 – 5	Irsal Afrinneza Nasution (INA); W 9 – 7	Do Huang Quan (VIE); W 9 – 5	Maung Maung (MYA); W 9 – 4	1st place, gold medalist(s)
Carlo Biado	Men's 9-Ball Pool Singles	Ricky Yang (INA); W 9 – 5	Le Quang Trung (VIE); W 9 – 6	Maung Maung (MYA); L 6 – 9	Did Not Advance	3rd place, bronze medalist(s)
Reynaldo Grandea; John Drahcir Mauricio; Jefrey Roda	Men's English Billiard Team	—N/a	Indonesia; L 0 – 3	Did Not Advance		
Carlo Biado; Warren Kiamco	Men's 9 Ball Doubles	Tanut Makkamontee (THA); Nitiwat Kanjanasri (THA); W 9 – 6	M. Suriya (LAO); V. Hongsavady (LAO); W 9 – 1	Aloysius Yapp (SIN); Toh Lian Han (SIN); W 9 – 5	Do Hoang Quan (VIE); Anh Tuan Nguyen (VIE); W 9 – 6	1st place, gold medalist(s)

=== Women's ===
Athlete	Event	Round of 16	Quarterfinals	Semifinals	Final	
Athlete	Event	Opposition Result	Opposition Result	Opposition Result	Opposition Result	Rank
Rubilen Amit	Women's 9-Ball Pool Singles	Bye	Fathrah Masum (INA); W 7 – 2	Aung Aye Mi (MYA); W 7 – 2	Chezka Centeno (PHI); L 5 – 7	2nd place, silver medalist(s)
Chezka Centeno	Women's 9-Ball Pool Singles	Thi Ngoc Le Doan (VIE); W 7 – 4	Jessica Tan Hui Ming (SIN); W 7 – 3	Siraphat Chitchomnart (THA); W 7 – 5	Rubilen Amit (PHI); W 7 – 5	1st place, gold medalist(s)

== Bowling ==
=== Men ===
Athlete	Event	Games 1–6						Total	Average	Grand Total	Rank
Athlete	Event	1	2	3	4	5	6	Total	Average	Grand Total	Rank
Jonas Jason Baltasar	Men's singles	178	184	167	227	183	165	1104	184.0		31
Kenneth Chua	Men's singles	196	170	180	181	200	207	1134	189		23
Kevin Cu	Men's singles	176	192	167	157	181	185	1058	176.3		37
Enrico Lorenzo Hernandez	Men's singles	201	211	161	193	170	206	1142	190.3		18
Jo-Mar Roland Jumapao	Men's singles	198	196	211	174	160	197	1136	189.3		22
Frederick Ong	Men's singles	235	156	193	159	201	188	1132	188.7		24
Frederick Ong; Kenneth Chua	Men's doubles	148	200	183	202	143	0	876	146.0	2068	20
Frederick Ong; Kenneth Chua	Men's doubles	203	157	203	201	209	219	1192	198.7	2068	20
Jo-Mar Jumapao; Enrico Hernandez	Men's doubles	229	146	179	224	166	156	1099	183.2	2251	17
Jo-Mar Jumapao; Enrico Hernandez	Men's doubles	216	206	185	193	172	180	1152	192.0	2251	17
Jonas Baltasar; Kevin Cu	Men's doubles	205	165	208	148	168	185	1079	179.8	2212	18
Jonas Baltasar; Kevin Cu	Men's doubles	198	178	150	188	183	236	1133	188.8	2212	18
Kenneth Chua; Jo-Mar Jumapao; Enrico Hernandez	Men's Trio	160	165	169	216	213	186	1109	184.8	3456	10
Kenneth Chua; Jo-Mar Jumapao; Enrico Hernandez	Men's Trio	158	220	164	179	160	224	1105	184.2	3456	10
Kenneth Chua; Jo-Mar Jumapao; Enrico Hernandez	Men's Trio	194	198	185	245	208	212	1242	207.0	3456	10
Jonas Baltasar; Kevin Cu; Frederick Ong	Men's Trio	147	161	172	134	184	192	990	165.0	2199	13
Jonas Baltasar; Kevin Cu; Frederick Ong	Men's Trio	196	215	192	161	222	223	1209	201.5	2199	13
Jonas Baltasar; Kevin Cu; Frederick Ong	Men's Trio	0	0	0	0	0	0	0	0	2199	13
Kenneth Chua; Jonas Baltasar; Jo-Mar Jumapao; Kevin Cu; Enrico Hernandez	Men's teams of five	226	189	178	153	212	146	1104	184.0	5629	5
Kenneth Chua; Jonas Baltasar; Jo-Mar Jumapao; Kevin Cu; Enrico Hernandez	Men's teams of five	150	178	164	194	204	200	1090	181.7	5629	5
Kenneth Chua; Jonas Baltasar; Jo-Mar Jumapao; Kevin Cu; Enrico Hernandez	Men's teams of five	212	192	195	161	182	225	1167	194.5	5629	5
Kenneth Chua; Jonas Baltasar; Jo-Mar Jumapao; Kevin Cu; Enrico Hernandez	Men's teams of five	224	180	204	169	174	165	1116	186.0	5629	5
Kenneth Chua; Jonas Baltasar; Jo-Mar Jumapao; Kevin Cu; Enrico Hernandez	Men's teams of five	174	200	214	188	173	203	1152	192.0	5629	5

=== Women ===
Athlete	Event	Games 1–6						Total	Average	Grand Total	Rank
Athlete	Event	1	2	3	4	5	6	Total	Average	Grand Total	Rank
Maria Lourdes Arles	Women's singles	177	213	207	175	199	183	1154	192.3		23
Liza Clutario	Women's singles	172	161	182	191	233	181	1120	186.7		27
Maria Liza Del Rosario	Women's singles	165	203	177	220	203	198	1166	194.3		20
Marian Lara Posadas	Women's singles	162	226	172	195	233	187	1175	195.8		18
Marie Alexis Sy	Women's singles	176	199	175	188	223	168	1129	188.2		25
Krizziah Lyn Tabora	Women's singles	223	202	220	199	192	231	1267	211.2		8
Liza del Rosario; Liza Clutario	Women's doubles	175	211	196	156	213	195	1146	191.0	2298	9
Liza del Rosario; Liza Clutario	Women's doubles	180	177	205	201	182	207	1152	192.0	2298	9
Krizziah Tabora; Lara Posadas	Women's doubles	167	177	199	188	196	183	1110	185.0	2233	12
Krizziah Tabora; Lara Posadas	Women's doubles	210	160	172	192	165	224	1123	187.2	2233	12
Marie Alexis Sy; Maria Arles	Women's doubles	150	215	220	228	183	212	1208	201.3	2421	6
Marie Alexis Sy; Maria Arles	Women's doubles	248	198	186	201	168	212	1213	202.2	2421	6
Marie Alexis Sy; Maria Lourdes Arles; Marian Lara Posadas	Women's Trio	202	215	213	180	201	184	1195	199.2	3608	3rd place, bronze medalist(s)
Marie Alexis Sy; Maria Lourdes Arles; Marian Lara Posadas	Women's Trio	188	210	223	179	176	211	1187	197.8	3608	3rd place, bronze medalist(s)
Marie Alexis Sy; Maria Lourdes Arles; Marian Lara Posadas	Women's Trio	201	234	245	178	198	170	1226	204.3	3608	3rd place, bronze medalist(s)
Liza Del Rosario; Krizziah Tabora; Liza Clutario	Women's Trio	195	205	231	214	205	207	1257	209.5	3579	5
Liza Del Rosario; Krizziah Tabora; Liza Clutario	Women's Trio	180	191	190	193	195	192	1141	190.2	3579	5
Liza Del Rosario; Krizziah Tabora; Liza Clutario	Women's Trio	174	191	227	182	201	206	1181	196.8	3579	5
Liza Del Rosario; Marie Alexis Sy; Krizzah Tabora; Marian Lara Posadas; Liza Clutario; Maria Lourdes Arles	Women's teams of five	212	183	225	200	213	226	1259	209.8	5776	3rd place, bronze medalist(s)
Liza Del Rosario; Marie Alexis Sy; Krizzah Tabora; Marian Lara Posadas; Liza Clutario; Maria Lourdes Arles	Women's teams of five	236	177	207	181	215	182	1198	199.7	5776	3rd place, bronze medalist(s)
Liza Del Rosario; Marie Alexis Sy; Krizzah Tabora; Marian Lara Posadas; Liza Clutario; Maria Lourdes Arles	Women's teams of five	193	203	214	235	255	233	1333/1333	203.3/222.3	5776	3rd place, bronze medalist(s)
Liza Del Rosario; Marie Alexis Sy; Krizzah Tabora; Marian Lara Posadas; Liza Clutario; Maria Lourdes Arles	Women's teams of five	175	207	160	172	168	146	1028	171.3	5776	3rd place, bronze medalist(s)
Liza Del Rosario; Marie Alexis Sy; Krizzah Tabora; Marian Lara Posadas; Liza Clutario; Maria Lourdes Arles	Women's teams of five	195	179	140	181	181	196	1072/1072	186.0/178.7	5776	3rd place, bronze medalist(s)

=== Women's masters ===
Athlete	Games 1–8								Subtotal	Games 9–16								Subtotal	Grand Total	Average	Rank	Finals	
Athlete	1	2	3	4	5	6	7	8	Subtotal	9	10	11	12	13	14	15	16	Subtotal	Grand Total	Average	Rank	Gold/Bronze	Rank
Liza Del Rosario	167	154	189	224	225	246	223	180	1608	215	234	231	202	280	200	181	227	1770	3378	206.1	7	Did Not Advance	
Krizziah Tabora	179	198	224	179	244	232	243	245	1744	189	167	193	203	182	201	233	241	1609	3353	204.6	8	Did Not Advance	
Marie Alexis Sy	254	165	166	202	155	191	201	189	1523	229	149	227	199	215	244	201	175	1639	3162	192.0	15	Did Not Advance	

== Boxing ==
=== Men's ===
Athlete	Event	Round of 16	Quarterfinal	Semifinal	Final	Rank
Rogen Ladon	49 kg	—N/a	Muhamad Fuad Mohd Redzuan (MAS); W 2 – 0	Bounphone Lavongsy (LAO); W 3 – 0	Kornelis Kwangu Langu (INA) L 1 – 2	2nd place, silver medalist(s)
Ian Clark Bautista	52 kg	Muhammad Azuwan Mohd Nor (MAS); W 3 – 0	Chatchai Butdee (THA); W 2 – 1	Thongbang Seuaphom (LAO); W KO R2 1:13	Mohammed Hanurdeen Hamid (SIN); W 2 – 1	1st place, gold medalist(s)
Mario Fernandez	56 kg	Bye	Tran Phu Cuong (VIE); W 3 – 0	Naing Latt (MYA); W TKO R1 0:02	Tanes Ongjunta (THA); W TKO R2 2:15	1st place, gold medalist(s)
Junel Cantancio	60 kg	—N/a	Graciano Joao Florindo de Jesus (TLS); W TKO R2 1:23	Saylom Ardee (THA); W 2 – 0	Nguyen Van Hai (VIE); W 2 – 0	1st place, gold medalist(s)
Eumir Felix Marcial	69 kg	—N/a	Bye	Apichet Saensit (THA); W 2 – 1	Tay Jia Wei (SIN); W KO R2 0:48	1st place, gold medalist(s)
Wilfredo Lopez	75 kg	—N/a	Kristianus Nong Sedo (INA); W 3 – 0	Dinh Hoang Truong (VIE); L 0 – 3	Did Not Advance	3rd place, bronze medalist(s)

=== Women's ===
Athlete	Event	Quarterfinal	Semifinal	Final	Rank
Josie Gabuco	48 kg	Aldriani Beatrichx Sugoro (INA); W 3 – 0	Hui Leona (SIN); W 3 – 0	Chuthamat Raksat (THA); W 3 – 0	1st place, gold medalist(s)
Irish Magno	51 kg	Novita Sinadia (INA); W 3 – 0	Sopida Satumrum (THA); W 2 – 0	Thi Yen Nguyen (VIE); L 1 – 2	2nd place, silver medalist(s)
Nesthy Petecio	54 kg	Bye	Ester Kalayukin (INA); W 3 – 0	Le Thi Bang (VIE); L 1 – 2	2nd place, silver medalist(s)
Riza Pasuit	57 kg	Bye	Christina Marwan Jembay (INA); L 0 – 3	Did Not Advance	3rd place, bronze medalist(s)

== Canoeing ==
=== Canoe-Kayak Flatwater ===
Men

Athlete	Event	Final	
Athlete	Event	Time	Rank
Ojay Fuentes; Hermie Macaranas	C-2 1000 m	3:58.377	3rd place, bronze medalist(s)
Ojay Fuentes; Hermie Macaranas	C-2 200 m	41.827	3rd place, bronze medalist(s)
Hermie Macaranas	C-1 1000 m	4:08.294	3rd place, bronze medalist(s)
Hermie Macaranas	C-1 200 m	43.577	3rd place, bronze medalist(s)
Marvin Amposta	C-2 1000 m	3:54.801	4
Marvin Amposta	K-1 200 m	41.415	5

== Cycling ==
Men

Athlete	Event	Time	Rank
Jerry Aquino Jr.	Road Race	3:19:47	31
Mark Galedo	Road Race	3:19:44	30
Rustom Lim	Road Race	3:19:33	18
Jan Paul Morales	Road Race	3:19:41	28
George Oconer	Road Race	3:19:33	15
Ronald Oranza	Road Race	3:19:33	21
Jerry Aquino Jr.	Criterium	53:46	12
Mark Galedo	Criterium	54:02	30
Rustom Lim	Criterium	53:46	24
Jan Paul Morales	Criterium	53:46	7
George Oconer	Criterium	53:46	20
Ronald Oranza	Criterium	54:00	27
Mark Galedo	Time Trial	56:21.59	6
Ronald Oranza	Time Trial	56:00.34	4

Women

Athlete	Event	Time	Rank
Avegail Rombaon	Road Race	2:49:43	6
Marella Vania Salamat	Road Race	2:49:47	8
Avegail Rombaon	Criterium	44:22	7
Marella Vania Salamat	Criterium	44:22	6
Marella Vania Salamat	Time Trial	44:46.38	1st place, gold medalist(s)

== Diving ==
Men

Athlete	Event	Final	
Athlete	Event	Points	Rank
John Elmer Fabriga	3 m springboard	236.90	7
John David Pahoyo	3 m springboard	216.25	8
John Elmer Fabriga; John David Pahoyo	Synchronized 3 m springboard	309.39	5

Women

Athlete	Event	Final	
Athlete	Event	Points	Rank
Hazel Bernadette Abiera	10 m platform	160.05	10
Riza Jane Domenios	10 m platform	159.75	11
Hazel Bernadette Abiera; Riza Jane Domenios	Synchronized 10 m platform	184.98	6

== Equestrian ==
=== Dressage ===
Athlete	Horse	Event	Qualifying		Individual				Final	
Athlete	Horse	Event	Score	Rank	Part1		Part2		Final	
Athlete	Horse	Event	Score	Rank	Score	Rank	Score	Rank	Total	Rank
Maria Angelica Ayala	Lazzaro 9	Individual	63.184	9	63.079	6 Q	60.600	6	123.679	6

=== Jumping ===
Athlete	Horse	Event	Round 1					Round 2					Final	
Athlete	Horse	Event	Jump	Time	Total	Overall	Rank	Jump	Time	Total	Overall	Rank	Total	Rank
Chiara Sophia Amor	Yalambi's Cantana	Team	4	0	4	80	6	16	0	16	24	4	104	6
Celina Gabrielle Gavieta	Rafale des Buttes	Team	0	0	38 (EL)	80	6	0	0	0	24	4	104	6
Danielle Andrea Santos	Kalandro	Team	0	0	38 (EL)	80	6	8	0	8	24	4	104	6

Individual

Athlete	Horse	Event	Final A				Final B				Jump Off			
Athlete	Horse	Event	Jump	Time	Total	Rank	Jump	Time	Total	Rank	Jump	Time	Total	Rank
Chiara Sophia Amor	Yalambi's Cantana	Individual	20	0	20	13 Q	24	0	24	10	Did Not Advance			

== Fencing ==
=== Men's ===
Athlete	Event	Seeding		Round of 16	Quarterfinals	Semifinals	Final	
Athlete	Event	Pool Record	Ranking	Opposition Score	Opposition Score	Opposition Score	Opposition Score	Rank
Noelito Jose Jr.	Individual épée	2 – 3	4 Q	Muhammad Haerullah (INA); L 11-13	Did Not Advance			
Gian Franco Rodriguez	Individual épée	3 – 2	3 Q	Samson Mun Hou Lee (SIN); L 6-15	Did Not Advance			
Nathaniel Perez	Individual foil	4 – 1	1 Q	Bye	Dennis Ariadinata Satriana (INA); W 15 – 13	Minh Quang Nguyen (VIE); L 14 – 15	Did Not Advance	3rd place, bronze medalist(s)
Emerson Segui	Individual foil	3 – 1	1 Q	Dennis Ariadinata Satriana (INA); L 13-15	Did Not Advance			
Eric Brando II	Individual sabre	4 – 2	2 Q	Bye	Peng Kean Yu (MAS); L 11 – 15	Did Not Advance		
Gian Carlo Nocom	Individual sabre	2 – 4	6	Did Not Advance				
Noelito Jose Jr. Gian Franco Rodriguez; Alamario Vizcayno	Team épée	—N/a			Thailand; L 40 – 45	Did Not Advance		
Eric Brando II; Donnie Arth Navarro; Gian Carlo Nocom	Team sabre	—N/a			Malaysia; L 30 – 45	Did Not Advance		
Wilfred Richard Curioso; Brennan Wayne Louie; Nathaniel Perez; Emerson Segui	Team foil	—N/a			Malaysia; W 45 – 18	Thailand; W 45 – 33	Singapore; L 40 – 45	2nd place, silver medalist(s)

=== Women's ===
Athlete	Event	Seeding		Round of 16	Quarterfinals	Semifinals	Final	
Athlete	Event	Pool Record	Ranking	Opposition Score	Opposition Score	Opposition Score	Opposition Score	Rank
Harlene Raguin	Individual épée	4 – 2	2 Q	Bye	Hanniel Abella (PHI); W 15 – 12	Rania Herlina Rahardja (SIN); W 15 – 10	Thi Len Tran (VIE); L 7 – 11	2nd place, silver medalist(s)
Hanniel Abella	Individual épée	3 – 2	3 Q	Bye	Harlene Raguin (PHI); L 12 – 15	Did Not Advance		
Justine Gail Tinio	Individual foil	2 – 2	3 Q	May Tinzar Kyaw (MYA); W 15 – 13	Đỗ Thị Ánh (VIE); W 15 – 11	Nguyen Thi Hoai Thu (VIE); W 15 – 6	Wang Wenying (SIN); L 7 – 15	2nd place, silver medalist(s)
Wilhelmina Lozada	Individual foil	1 – 4	4	Did Not Advance				
Clichelleyn Del Rosario	Individual sabre	0 – 4	5	Did Not Advance				
Jylyn Nicanor	Individual sabre	2 – 2	3 Q	Pornsawan Ngernrungruangroj (THA); L 11 – 15	Did Not Advance			
Harlene Raguin; Hanniel Abella; Anna Gabriella Estimada	Team épée	—N/a			Myanmar; W 45 – 25	Singapore; W 29 – 28	Vietnam; L 28 – 45	2nd place, silver medalist(s)
Wilhelmina Lozada; Justine Gail Tinio; Keren Pangilinan	Team foil	—N/a			Malaysia; W 45 – 322	Singapore; L 28 – 36	Did Not Advance	3rd place, bronze medalist(s)
Jylyn Nicanor; Clichelleyn Del Rosario; Geisha De Leon	Team sabre	—N/a			Indonesia; L 44 – 45	Did Not Advance		

== Floorball ==
=== Men's ===
Squad list	Preliminary round		Bronze medal	Rank
Squad list	Round Robin	Rank	Bronze medal	Rank
Jeremiah Vincent Beltran; Massada Dem Cabillas; Ronald Rozz Santos Carbonell; Mark Jello Argarin Cerdon; Jame Kevin De Jesus; Ian Galman; Luis Manila III; Joseph Monico Navarro; Henielee Ojano Pastor; Joshua Jerahmeel Paunil; Jose Maria Peteza Jr. Mark Anthony Polo; Ralph Andrew Ramos; Justin Jerome Santiago; Hazzer Talingdan; Lionel Nico Velez; Michael Villanueva; Jan Claude Vitaliano	Malaysia; L 0 – 10	4 Q	Malaysia; L 3 – 11	4
Jeremiah Vincent Beltran; Massada Dem Cabillas; Ronald Rozz Santos Carbonell; Mark Jello Argarin Cerdon; Jame Kevin De Jesus; Ian Galman; Luis Manila III; Joseph Monico Navarro; Henielee Ojano Pastor; Joshua Jerahmeel Paunil; Jose Maria Peteza Jr. Mark Anthony Polo; Ralph Andrew Ramos; Justin Jerome Santiago; Hazzer Talingdan; Lionel Nico Velez; Michael Villanueva; Jan Claude Vitaliano	Singapore; L 2 – 10	4 Q	Malaysia; L 3 – 11	4
Jeremiah Vincent Beltran; Massada Dem Cabillas; Ronald Rozz Santos Carbonell; Mark Jello Argarin Cerdon; Jame Kevin De Jesus; Ian Galman; Luis Manila III; Joseph Monico Navarro; Henielee Ojano Pastor; Joshua Jerahmeel Paunil; Jose Maria Peteza Jr. Mark Anthony Polo; Ralph Andrew Ramos; Justin Jerome Santiago; Hazzer Talingdan; Lionel Nico Velez; Michael Villanueva; Jan Claude Vitaliano	Thailand; L 2 – 11	4 Q	Malaysia; L 3 – 11	4

== Football ==
Squad

Head Coach: Marlon Maro

No.	Pos.	Player	Date of birth (age)	Club
1	GK	Florencio Badelic Jr.	22 May 1994 (age 32)	(Philippine Football Federation) Global
25	GK	Nathanael Villanueva	25 October 1995 (age 30)	(Philippine Football Federation) Pachanga Diliman
2	DF	Mark Besana	14 March 1995 (age 31)	(Philippine Football Federation) UP Fighting Maroons
3	DF	Neil Dorimon	3 January 1992 (age 34)	(Philippine Football Federation) Mendiola
4	DF	Fitch Arboleda	4 January 1993 (age 33)	(Philippine Football Federation) Stallions
5	DF	Julian Clarino	15 August 1995 (age 31)	(Philippine Football Federation) UP Fighting Maroons
14	DF	Dominic Del Rosario	14 November 1996 (age 29)	(Philippine Football Federation) JP Voltes
15	DF	Richard Talaroc Jr.	23 April 1995 (age 31)	(Philippine Football Federation) Global
22	DF	Francisco Santos	8 January 1994 (age 32)	
27	DF	Shirmar Felongco	27 April 1993 (age 33)	(Philippine Football Federation) Stallion
28	DF	Ronnie Aguisanda	21 January 1992 (age 34)	(Philippine Football Federation) Green Archers United
7	MF	Arnel Amita	10 January 1995 (age 31)	(Philippine Football Federation) Manila Jeepney
8	MF	Daniel Gadia	3 July 1995 (age 31)	(Philippine Football Federation) UP Fighting Maroons
9	MF	Paolo Bugas	22 October 1994 (age 31)	(Philippine Football Federation) Global
17	MF	Jaime Cheng	28 August 1995 (age 31)	
20	MF	Kennedy Uzoka	8 August 1993 (age 33)	(Philippine Football Federation) Green Archers United
6	FW	Nathanael Alquiros	27 July 1992 (age 34)	(Philippine Football Federation) Stallion
11	FW	Connor Tacagni	27 September 1993 (age 33)	(Philippine Football Federation) Mendiola
19	FW	Paolo Salenga	17 December 1994 (age 31)	(Philippine Football Federation) Global
29	FW	Gerardo Valmayor III (c)	8 June 1992 (age 34)	(Philippine Football Federation) Pachanga Diliman

== Golf ==
=== Men's ===
Athlete	Event	Round 1	Round 2	Round 3	Round 4	Total	Par	Rank
Dan Emilio Cruz	Individual	72 (E)	72 (E)	78 (+6)	76 (+4)	298	+10	16
Weiwei Gao	Individual	75 (+3)	76 (+4)	72 (E)	73 (+1)	296	+8	10
Aniceto Hermenegildo Mandanas	Individual	80 (+8)	81 (+9)	75 (+3)	78 (+6)	314	+26	24
Ruperto Zaragoza III	Individual	75 (+3)	74 (+2)	75 (+3)	71 (-1)	295	+7	8
Ruperto Zaragoza III; Aniceto Hermenegildo Mandanas; Weiwei Gao; Dan Emilio Cruz	Team	75; ~~80~~; 75; 72	74; ~~81~~; 76; 72	75; 75; 72; ~~78~~	71; ~~78~~; 73; 76	886	—N/a	4

=== Women's ===
Athlete	Event	Round 1	Round 2	Round 3	Total	Par	Rank
Harmie Nicole Constantino	Individual	74 (+2)	71 (-1)	76 (+4)	221	+5	5
Bianca Isabel Pagdanganan	Individual	81 (+9)	76 (+4)	76 (+4)	233	+17	11
Lou Daniella Uy	Individual	87 (+15)	82 (+10)	78 (+6)	247	+31	20
Harmie Nicole Constantino; Bianca Isabel Pagdanganan; Lou Daniella Uy	Individual	74; 81; ~~87~~	71; 76; ~~82~~	76; 76; ~~78~~	454	—N/a	5

== Gymnastics ==
=== Artistic Gymnastics ===
Men's

Athlete	Apparatus						Individual All-around		Team	
Athlete	Floor	Pommel horse	Rings	Vault	Parallel bars	Horizontal bar	Total	Rank	Total	Rank
Rafael Ablaza III	13.850 Q	10.300	11.800 R	13.700 R	12.700 R	11.500 R	73.850 Q	16		
Reyland Capellan	14.400 Q	5.850	10.800	14.650 Q	10.750	10.400	66.850	20		
Macker-Brandon Judulang	12.400	6.800	11.300	13.550	11.900	10.200	66.150	21		
Jan Gwynn Timbang	13.450	11.000 R	11.500 R	13.700	11.000	11.000	71.650 Q	18		
Team Total	54.100	33.950	45.400	55.600	46.350	43.100			278.500	5

Individual

Athlete	Event	Final							
Athlete	Event	Floor	Pommel Horse	Rings	Vault	Parallel Bars	Horizontal Bar	Total	Rank
Rafael Ablaza III	Individual all-around	13.150	10.250	11.450	13.700	12.000	11.050	71.600	8
Rafael Ablaza III	Floor	13.400						13.400	8
Jan Gwynn Timbang	Individual all-around	13.950	8.900	9.700	13.750	12.050	10.650	69.000	10
Reyland Capellan	Floor	14.733						14.733	1st place, gold medalist(s)
Reyland Capellan	Vault				14.616			14.616	3rd place, bronze medalist(s)

Women's

Athlete	Apparatus				Individual All-around		Team	
Athlete	Floor	Balance Beam	Uneven Bars	Vault	Total	Rank	Total	Rank
Rachelle Arellano	12.050	10.600	8.950	12.350	43.950	18		
Sofia Isabel Gonzalez	12.200	12.350	8.450	12.850 R	45.850	16		
Elizabeth LeDuc	12.800 Q	13.050 Q	10.800 R	13.250	49.900 Q	9		
Ma. Cristina Onofre	12.400	9.000	4.450	12.950 R	38.800	22		
Ava Lorein Verdeflor	12.450 Q	12.600 R	12.650 Q	13.050	50.750 Q	7		
Team Total	49.850	48.600	40.850	52.100			191.400	3rd place, bronze medalist(s)

Individual

Athlete	Event	Final					
Athlete	Event	Floor	Balance Beam	Uneven Bars	Vault	Total	Rank
Elizabeth LeDuc	Individual all-around	12.950	11.650	10.700	13.250	48.550	6
Elizabeth LeDuc	Floor	12.566				12.566	8
Elizabeth LeDuc	Balance Beam		12.700			12.700	5
Ava Lorein Verdeflor	Individual all-around	12.750	12.200	12.450	13.000	50.400	4
Ava Lorein Verdeflor	Floor	12.900				12.900	7
Ava Lorein Verdeflor	Uneven Bars			12.366		12.366	2nd place, silver medalist(s)

== Judo ==
=== Men's ===
Athlete	Event	Elimination round of 16	Quarterfinal	Semifinal	Final	Rank
Dennis Lloyd Catipon	66 kg	—N/a	Soukphaxay Sithisane (LAO); L 0 – 100S1	Repechage; Lee You Ren (SIN); W 101 – 010	Repechage; Mohd Farhan Uzair Mohd Fikri (MAS); L 000S1 – 101	5
Gilbert Ramirez	73 kg	Bye	Masayuki Terada (THA); L 000 – 100	Repechage; Palitha Phrommala (LAO); W 100 – 000	Repechage; Danh Ut Kien (VIE); W 103 – 000	3rd place, bronze medalist(s)
Kodo Nakano	81 kg	Bye	Chittakano Xayasan (THA); W 000 – 000S1	Nopachai Kocharat (THA); L 000 – 100S1	Repechage; Gary Weng Luen Chow (SIN); L 000 – 100	5
Kenji Yahata	90 kg	—N/a	Gabriel Yang (SIN); L 000S1 – 000	Repechage; Tran Thuong (VIE); L 000 – 100	Did Not Advance	

=== Women's ===
Athlete	Event	Quarterfinal	Semifinal	Final	Rank
Helen Dawa	52 kg	Intan Nur Hayati Mahathir (LAO); W 100 – 000	Phonenaly Phonenaly (LAO); L 000S1 – 100	Repechage; Ni Putu Prapti Virgynia (INA); W 101S1 – 000	3rd place, bronze medalist(s)
Jenielou Mosqueda	57 kg	Manivang Baiyan (LAO); W 100S1 – 000	Ang Xuan Yi (SIN); L 010 – 100	Repechage; Su Khin Khin (MYA); L 000S1 – 001	5
Kiyomi Watanabe	63 kg	Tania Su Wen Forichon (SIN); W 101 – 000	Thi Huong Nguyen (VIE); W 100 – 000	Orapin Senatham (THA); W 101S1 – 000	1st place, gold medalist(s)
Bianca Mae Estrella	70 kg	Szalsza Maulida (VIE); L 000 – 001	Somsoudalath Venevankham (LAO); L 000 – 000	Did Not Advance	

== Netball ==
Philippines national netball team
Players	Coaching staff
Teresa Angeline Aquino; Remia Buenacosa; Danielle Michiko Castaneda; Ana Thea Cenarosa; Maricar Convencido; Michelle Datuin; Leanne Espina (c); Loraine Angela Lim; Kristine Marie Teo; Mary Anne Jenelle Yabut	Head coach: (England) Fransien Howarth; Assistant coaches: (Philippines) Angelina Fedillaga; (Singapore) Loo Yi Lin Jolynn

Team	Preliminary round		Semifinal	Final	Rank
Team	Round Robin	Rank	Semifinal	Final	Rank
Philippines	Thailand; L 22 – 62	5	Did Not Advance		
Philippines	Malaysia; L 11 – 112	5	Did Not Advance		
Philippines	Myanmar; L 31 – 56	5	Did Not Advance		
Philippines	Singapore; L 12 – 84	5	Did Not Advance		
Philippines	Brunei; L 32 – 56	5	Did Not Advance		

== Pencak Silat ==
Athlete	Event	Quarterfinal	Semifinal	Final	Rank
Alshamier Ibnohasim	Men's 50 kg	Pedro Alves Faria (TLS); W WO – WDR	Awaluddin Nur (INA); L 0 – 5	Did Not Advance	3rd place, bronze medalist(s)
Michael Tesoro	Men's 60 kg	Toto Thammavong (LAO); L 0 – 5	Did Not Advance		
Juanillo Ballesta II	Men's 85 kg	—N/a	Tri Juanda Samsul Bahar (INA); L 0 – 5	Did Not Advance	3rd place, bronze medalist(s)
Clyde Joy Baria	Women's 60 kg	Siti Zubaidah Che Omar (MAS); W 4 – 1	Wewey Wita (INA); L 0 – 5	Did Not Advance	3rd place, bronze medalist(s)
Renzel Alam	Women's 65 kg	Selly Andriani (INA); L 0 – 5	Did Not Advance		

== Pétanque ==
=== Men's ===
Athlete	Event	Preliminary		Barrage			Semifinal	Final	Rank
Athlete	Event	Points/Standing	Rank	Points	Total	Rank	Semifinal	Final	Rank
Arvin Baking	Shooting	28	3	15	43	5	Did Not Advance		
Arvin Baking	Singles	0W – 8L	8	—N/a			Did Not Advance		
Arvin Baking; Violeta Dela Cruz	Mixed doubles	2W – 7L	8	—N/a			Did Not Advance		

=== Women's ===
Athlete	Event	Preliminary		Barrage			Semifinal	Final	Rank
Athlete	Event	Points	Rank	Points	Total	Rank	Semifinal	Final	Rank
Violeta Dela Cruz	Shooting	9	9	11	20	9	Did Not Advance		
Violeta Dela Cruz	Singles	2W – 6L	8	—N/a			Did Not Advance		
Violeta Dela Cruz; Ara Joana Benito	Doubles	1W – 6L	6	—N/a			Did Not Advance		

== Rowing ==
=== Men's ===
Athlete	Event	Heat			Repechage			Final	
Athlete	Event	Heat	Time	Rank	Heat	Time	Rank	Time	Rank
Justine Karyle Vinas	Lightweight Single 500 m	—N/a						1:45.00	6
Justine Karyle Vinas	Lightweight Single 1000 m	2	3:40.55	3	2	3:41.65	3	3:46.68	4
Nestor Cordova	Single Sculls 500 m	—N/a						1:36.39	4
Nestor Cordova	Single Sculls 1000 m	1	3:38.64	3	2	3:35.40	3	3:30.47	2nd place, silver medalist(s)
Benjamin Tolentino; Edgar Ilas	Lightweight Double 500 m	—N/a						1:27.86	4
Benjamin Tolentino; Edgar Ilas	Lightweight Double 1000 m	2	3:23.82	1	—N/a			3:15.04	3rd place, bronze medalist(s)
Roque Abala Jr. Alvin Amposta	Pair 500 m	—N/a						1:32.48	6
Roque Abala Jr. Alvin Amposta	Pair 1000 m	2	3:37.73	1	—N/a			3:25.85	5

=== Women's ===
Athlete	Event	Heat			Repechage			Final	
Athlete	Event	Heat	Time	Rank	Heat	Time	Rank	Time	Rank
Melcah Jen Caballero	Lightweight Single 500 m	—N/a						1:51.51	4
Melcah Jen Caballero	Lightweight Single 1000 m	1	3:57.76	4	—N/a			4:14.21	5

== Rugby Sevens ==
=== Men's ===
Squad list	Preliminary round		Gold Medal	Rank
Squad list	Round Robin	Rank	Gold Medal	Rank
Alexander Vincent Aronson; Justin Coveney; Andrew Stephen Everingham; Christopher Hitch; Gareth Leslie Holgate; Jake Gerald Letts; Patrice Davide Louis Olivier; Benjamin Joshua Saunders; Matthew Donato Saunders; Oliver Joseph Saunders; Andrew James Wolff; Vincent Francis Young; Coach: (New Zealand) Geoffrey Alley	Thailand; W 24 – 10	1 Q	Malaysia; W 24 – 7	1st place, gold medalist(s)
Alexander Vincent Aronson; Justin Coveney; Andrew Stephen Everingham; Christopher Hitch; Gareth Leslie Holgate; Jake Gerald Letts; Patrice Davide Louis Olivier; Benjamin Joshua Saunders; Matthew Donato Saunders; Oliver Joseph Saunders; Andrew James Wolff; Vincent Francis Young; Coach: (New Zealand) Geoffrey Alley	Singapore; W 17 – 0	1 Q	Malaysia; W 24 – 7	1st place, gold medalist(s)
Alexander Vincent Aronson; Justin Coveney; Andrew Stephen Everingham; Christopher Hitch; Gareth Leslie Holgate; Jake Gerald Letts; Patrice Davide Louis Olivier; Benjamin Joshua Saunders; Matthew Donato Saunders; Oliver Joseph Saunders; Andrew James Wolff; Vincent Francis Young; Coach: (New Zealand) Geoffrey Alley	Cambodia; W 55 – 0	1 Q	Malaysia; W 24 – 7	1st place, gold medalist(s)
Alexander Vincent Aronson; Justin Coveney; Andrew Stephen Everingham; Christopher Hitch; Gareth Leslie Holgate; Jake Gerald Letts; Patrice Davide Louis Olivier; Benjamin Joshua Saunders; Matthew Donato Saunders; Oliver Joseph Saunders; Andrew James Wolff; Vincent Francis Young; Coach: (New Zealand) Geoffrey Alley	Laos; W 43 – 0	1 Q	Malaysia; W 24 – 7	1st place, gold medalist(s)
Alexander Vincent Aronson; Justin Coveney; Andrew Stephen Everingham; Christopher Hitch; Gareth Leslie Holgate; Jake Gerald Letts; Patrice Davide Louis Olivier; Benjamin Joshua Saunders; Matthew Donato Saunders; Oliver Joseph Saunders; Andrew James Wolff; Vincent Francis Young; Coach: (New Zealand) Geoffrey Alley	Malaysia; W 24 – 10	1 Q	Malaysia; W 24 – 7	1st place, gold medalist(s)

=== Women's ===
Squad list	Preliminary round		Bronze Medal	Rank
Squad list	Round Robin	Rank	Bronze Medal	Rank
Rosemarie Dela Cruz; Kaye Llanie Honoras; Helena Roxanne Indigne; Eloisa Jasmine Jordan; Ada Milby; Aiumi Ono; Anna Beatrix Pacis; Rassiel Sales; Madille Salinas; Angella Camille San Juan; Sylvia Tudoc; Dixie Star Yu; Coach: (Australia) Shirley Russell	Laos; W 17 – 0	3 Q	Malaysia; W 22 – 0	3rd place, bronze medalist(s)
Rosemarie Dela Cruz; Kaye Llanie Honoras; Helena Roxanne Indigne; Eloisa Jasmine Jordan; Ada Milby; Aiumi Ono; Anna Beatrix Pacis; Rassiel Sales; Madille Salinas; Angella Camille San Juan; Sylvia Tudoc; Dixie Star Yu; Coach: (Australia) Shirley Russell	Thailand; L 0 - 36	3 Q	Malaysia; W 22 – 0	3rd place, bronze medalist(s)
Rosemarie Dela Cruz; Kaye Llanie Honoras; Helena Roxanne Indigne; Eloisa Jasmine Jordan; Ada Milby; Aiumi Ono; Anna Beatrix Pacis; Rassiel Sales; Madille Salinas; Angella Camille San Juan; Sylvia Tudoc; Dixie Star Yu; Coach: (Australia) Shirley Russell	Singapore; L 7 – 12	3 Q	Malaysia; W 22 – 0	3rd place, bronze medalist(s)
Rosemarie Dela Cruz; Kaye Llanie Honoras; Helena Roxanne Indigne; Eloisa Jasmine Jordan; Ada Milby; Aiumi Ono; Anna Beatrix Pacis; Rassiel Sales; Madille Salinas; Angella Camille San Juan; Sylvia Tudoc; Dixie Star Yu; Coach: (Australia) Shirley Russell	Malaysia; W 27 – 0	3 Q	Malaysia; W 22 – 0	3rd place, bronze medalist(s)

== Sailing ==
=== Men's ===
Athlete	Event	Race									Medal Race	Net Points	Total Points	Final Rank
Athlete	Event	1	2	3	4	5	6	7	8	9	Medal Race	Net Points	Total Points	Final Rank
Rubin Cruz Jr.	Laser standard	(4)	4	4	4	3	2	4	4	4	8	37	41	4
Lester Troy Tayong; Emerson Villena	470	(3)	1	2	2	2	2	1	3	3	8	24	27	2nd place, silver medalist(s)
Yancy Kaibigan	RS:X	4	3	(5)	3	5	3	3	2	4	6	33	38	4
Dazer Balangue	Optimist (U16)	5	4	4	4	4	5	4	—N/a	—N/a	8	38	38	4
Ridgely Balladares; Rommel Chavez; Richly Magsanay	Match Racing	Round Robin 1 Thailand; W							Round Robin 2 Singapore; L			Final Round; Singapore; W		1st place, gold medalist(s)
Ridgely Balladares; Rommel Chavez; Richly Magsanay	Fleet Racing	1	2	2	2	1	1	3	—N/a	—N/a	6	18	18	2nd place, silver medalist(s)

=== Women's ===
Athlete	Event	Race										Total Points	Net Points	Final Rank
Athlete	Event	1	2	3	4	5	6	7	8	9	10	Total Points	Net Points	Final Rank
Alaiza Mae Belmonte	Laser Radial	(4)	4	4	4	2	4	4	4	2	8	36	40	4
Rye Lee Caasi; Jerene Durana; Cyrin Ann Guingona; Rheycilla Manaog	Match Racing	—N/a												4
Rye Lee Caasi; Jerene Durana; Cyrin Ann Guingona; Rheycilla Manaog	Fleet Racing	4	3	4	3	4	3	4	—N/a	—N/a	8	33	33	4

== Sepak Takraw ==
Athlete	Event	Preliminary round		Semifinal	Final	Rank
Athlete	Event	Round Robin	Rank	Semifinal	Final	Rank
John John Bobier; Rhemwil Catana; Ronsited Gabayeron; John Jeffrey Morcillos; Regie Reznan Pabriga	Regu	Laos; L 1– 2	4	Did Not Advance		3rd place, bronze medalist(s)
John John Bobier; Rhemwil Catana; Ronsited Gabayeron; John Jeffrey Morcillos; Regie Reznan Pabriga	Regu	Malaysia; L 0 – 2	4	Did Not Advance		3rd place, bronze medalist(s)
John John Bobier; Rhemwil Catana; Ronsited Gabayeron; John Jeffrey Morcillos; Regie Reznan Pabriga	Regu	Singapore; L 0 – 2	4	Did Not Advance		3rd place, bronze medalist(s)
Emmanuel Escote; Jason Huerte; Rheyjey Ortouste	Doubles	Laos; W 2 – 0	1 Q	Singapore; W 2 – 1	Myanmar; L 1 – 2	2nd place, silver medalist(s)
Emmanuel Escote; Jason Huerte; Rheyjey Ortouste	Doubles	Brunei; W 2 – 0	1 Q	Singapore; W 2 – 1	Myanmar; L 1 – 2	2nd place, silver medalist(s)

== Shooting ==
=== Men's ===
Athlete	Event	Qualification		Semifinal		Final	
Athlete	Event	Points	Rank	Points	Rank	Points	Rank
Jayson Valdez	10 m Air Rifle	611.7	3 Q	—N/a		181.0	3rd place, bronze medalist(s)
Jayson Valdez	50 m Rifle Prone	607.7	10	Did Not Advance			
Eric Ang	Trap	115	3 Q	13	3 QB	Mohd Zain Amat (SIN); L 10 – 13	4
Miguel David Laperal	Trap	112	7	Did Not Advance			
Hagen Alexander Topacio	Trap	97	14	Did Not Advance			
Eric Ang; Miguel David Laperal; Hagen Alexander Topacio	Trap Team	—N/a				324	3rd place, bronze medalist(s)
Joaquin Miguel Ancheta	Skeet	100	11	Did Not Advance			
Paul Brian Rosario	Skeet	110	6 Q	8	5	Did Not Advance	
Gabriel Tong	Skeet	90	12	Did Not Advance			
Joaquin Miguel Ancheta; Paul Brian Rosario; Gabriel Tong	Skeet Team	—N/a				300	4
Lamberto Espiritu	Precision Pistol	1442–053x	9	Did Not Advance			
Jerome Jovanne Morales	Precision Pistol	1446–065x	8	Did Not Advance			
Mar Udan	Precision Pistol	1467–079x	6 QB	Teh Kah Hoon (SIN); L 209 – 221	4	Did Not Advance	
Lamberto Espiritu; Jerome Jovanne Morales; Mar Udan	Precision Pistol Team	—N/a				1742–74x	3rd place, bronze medalist(s)

=== Women's ===
Athlete	Event	Qualification		Semifinal		Final	
Athlete	Event	Points	Rank	Points	Rank	Points	Rank
Amparo Teresa Acuna	50 m rifle 3 positions						
Amparo Teresa Acuna	50 m Rifle Prone	612.7	8 Q	—N/a		615.3	8
Amparo Teresa Acuna	10 m Air Rifle	406.3	8 Q	—N/a		139.1	5
Inna Therese Gutierrez	50 m rifle 3 positions						
Inna Therese Gutierrez	50 m Rifle Prone	609.6	3 Q	—N/a		592.9	12
Elvie Baldivino	Precision Pistol	1460 – 072x	2 Q	230 – 8x	2 QG	Norizan Mustafa (SIN); W 230 – 9x – 228 – 6x	1st place, gold medalist(s)
Carmelita Guillermo	Precision Pistol	1414 – 037x	9	Did Not Advance			
Franchette Shayne Quiroz	Precision Pistol	1372 – 041x	10	Did Not Advance			
Elvie Baldivino; Carmelita Guillermo; Franchette Shayne Quiroz	Precision Pistol Team	—N/a				1700 – 60x	2nd place, silver medalist(s)

== Softball ==
=== Men's ===
Squad list	Preliminary round		Semifinal	Final	Rank
Squad list	Round Robin	Rank	Semifinal	Final	Rank
Isidro Abello; Sonny Boy Acuna; Emerson Atilano; Denmark Bathan; Orlando Binarao; Oscar Bradshaw IV; Jasper Cabrera; Edmer Del Socorro; Vermon Diaz; Jeffry Hardillo; Ben Maravilles; Gregorio Marquez; William Jess Mendoza; Anthony Olaez; Saxon Omandac; Joseph Orillana; Apolonio Rosales	Thailand; W 8 – 1	1 Q	Singapore; W 8 – 0	Indonesia; W 6 – 4	1st place, gold medalist(s)
Isidro Abello; Sonny Boy Acuna; Emerson Atilano; Denmark Bathan; Orlando Binarao; Oscar Bradshaw IV; Jasper Cabrera; Edmer Del Socorro; Vermon Diaz; Jeffry Hardillo; Ben Maravilles; Gregorio Marquez; William Jess Mendoza; Anthony Olaez; Saxon Omandac; Joseph Orillana; Apolonio Rosales	Malaysia; W 8 – 1	1 Q	Singapore; W 8 – 0	Indonesia; W 6 – 4	1st place, gold medalist(s)
Isidro Abello; Sonny Boy Acuna; Emerson Atilano; Denmark Bathan; Orlando Binarao; Oscar Bradshaw IV; Jasper Cabrera; Edmer Del Socorro; Vermon Diaz; Jeffry Hardillo; Ben Maravilles; Gregorio Marquez; William Jess Mendoza; Anthony Olaez; Saxon Omandac; Joseph Orillana; Apolonio Rosales	Indonesia; W 10 – 8	1 Q	Singapore; W 8 – 0	Indonesia; W 6 – 4	1st place, gold medalist(s)
Isidro Abello; Sonny Boy Acuna; Emerson Atilano; Denmark Bathan; Orlando Binarao; Oscar Bradshaw IV; Jasper Cabrera; Edmer Del Socorro; Vermon Diaz; Jeffry Hardillo; Ben Maravilles; Gregorio Marquez; William Jess Mendoza; Anthony Olaez; Saxon Omandac; Joseph Orillana; Apolonio Rosales	Singapore; W 11 – 5	1 Q	Singapore; W 8 – 0	Indonesia; W 6 – 4	1st place, gold medalist(s)

=== Women's ===
Squad list	Preliminary round		Semifinal	Final	Rank
Squad list	Round Robin	Rank	Semifinal	Final	Rank
Lorna Adorable; Francesca Altomonte; Veronica Belleza; Annalie Benjamen; Rizza Bernardino; Garnet Agnes Blando; Shaira Damasing; Luzviminda Embudo; Marlyn Francisco; Florabele Pabiania; Ma. Celestine Palma; Elma Parohinog; Kriska Piad; Cristy Joy Roa; Queeny Sabobo; Angelie Ursabia; Arianne Vallestero	Indonesia; W 6 – 0	1 Q	Singapore; W 10 – 0	Thailand; W 3 – 0	1st place, gold medalist(s)
Lorna Adorable; Francesca Altomonte; Veronica Belleza; Annalie Benjamen; Rizza Bernardino; Garnet Agnes Blando; Shaira Damasing; Luzviminda Embudo; Marlyn Francisco; Florabele Pabiania; Ma. Celestine Palma; Elma Parohinog; Kriska Piad; Cristy Joy Roa; Queeny Sabobo; Angelie Ursabia; Arianne Vallestero	Singapore; W 8 – 1	1 Q	Singapore; W 10 – 0	Thailand; W 3 – 0	1st place, gold medalist(s)
Lorna Adorable; Francesca Altomonte; Veronica Belleza; Annalie Benjamen; Rizza Bernardino; Garnet Agnes Blando; Shaira Damasing; Luzviminda Embudo; Marlyn Francisco; Florabele Pabiania; Ma. Celestine Palma; Elma Parohinog; Kriska Piad; Cristy Joy Roa; Queeny Sabobo; Angelie Ursabia; Arianne Vallestero	Thailand; W 9 – 2	1 Q	Singapore; W 10 – 0	Thailand; W 3 – 0	1st place, gold medalist(s)
Lorna Adorable; Francesca Altomonte; Veronica Belleza; Annalie Benjamen; Rizza Bernardino; Garnet Agnes Blando; Shaira Damasing; Luzviminda Embudo; Marlyn Francisco; Florabele Pabiania; Ma. Celestine Palma; Elma Parohinog; Kriska Piad; Cristy Joy Roa; Queeny Sabobo; Angelie Ursabia; Arianne Vallestero	Malaysia; W 12 – 0	1 Q	Singapore; W 10 – 0	Thailand; W 3 – 0	1st place, gold medalist(s)

== Squash ==
=== Individual ===
Athlete	Events	Preliminary	Quarterfinal	Semifinal	Final	
Athlete	Opposition Score	Opposition Score	Opposition Score	Opposition Score	Opposition Score	Rank
Robert Andrew Garcia	Men's	Paing Thet (MYA); W 3 – 0	Muhd A Bahtiar (MAS); L 0 – 3	Did Not Advance		
David William Pelino	Men's	Arnold Phatraprasit (THA); W 3 – 2	Samuel Kang (SIN); L 0 – 3	Did Not Advance		
Jamyca Aribado	Women's	Yuliana Catur (INA); W 3 – 1	Nur A. Abdul Aziz (SIN); W 3 – 0	V. R. Gnanasigamani (MAS); L 0 – 3	Did Not Advance	3rd place, bronze medalist(s)

=== Team ===
Squad list	Preliminary round		Semifinal	Final	Rank
Squad list	Round Robin	Rank	Semifinal	Final	Rank
Ricky Espinola; Robert Andrew Garcia; David William Pelino	Singapore; L 0 – 2	2 Q	Did Not Advance		3rd place, bronze medalist(s)
Ricky Espinola; Robert Andrew Garcia; David William Pelino	Malaysia; L 0 – 3	2 Q	Did Not Advance		3rd place, bronze medalist(s)
Ricky Espinola; Robert Andrew Garcia; David William Pelino	Thailand; W 3 – 0	2 Q	Did Not Advance		3rd place, bronze medalist(s)
Ricky Espinola; David William Pelino	Indonesia; L 0 – 2	2 Q	Did Not Advance		3rd place, bronze medalist(s)
Ricky Espinola; David William Pelino	Singapore; L 0 – 2	2 Q	Did Not Advance		3rd place, bronze medalist(s)
Ricky Espinola; David William Pelino	Myanmar; W 2 – 0	2 Q	Did Not Advance		3rd place, bronze medalist(s)

== Swimming ==
=== Men's ===
Athlete	Event	Heats		Final	
Athlete	Event	Time	Rank	Time	Rank
Jose Joaquin Gonzales	400 m freestyle	4:09.07	4	Did Not Advance	
Jose Joaquin Gonzales	100 m backstroke	59.45	5 Q	59.83	8
Jose Joaquin Gonzales	200 m backstroke	—N/a		2:06.74	5
Jose Joaquin Gonzales	200 m individual medley	2:10.86	2 Q	2:06.63	6
Jose Joaquin Gonzales	400 m individual medley	—N/a		4:31.37	5
Joshua Hall	50 m breaststroke	28.39	1 Q	28.32	2nd place, silver medalist(s)
Joshua Hall	100 m breaststroke	1:03.34	2 Q	1:02.87	3rd place, bronze medalist(s)
Jessie Lacuna	100 m freestyle	51.51	3 Q	51.28	5
Jessie Lacuna	200 m freestyle	1:52.78	1 Q	1:50.82	4
Jessie Lacuna	400 m freestyle	4:03.13	2 Q	3:55.34	2nd place, silver medalist(s)
Jessie Lacuna	100 m butterfly	55.50	3 Q	55.34	7
Jessie Lacuna	200 m butterfly	2:08.37	3 Q	2:00.89	3rd place, bronze medalist(s)
Jessie Lacuna	200 m individual medley	2:09.63	2 Q	2:02.24	3rd place, bronze medalist(s)
Axel Toni Steven Ngui	50 m backstroke	27.61	5	Did Not Advance	
Axel Toni Steven Ngui	50 m freestyle	24.27	5	Did Not Advance	
Axel Toni Steven Ngui	100 m freestyle	52.37	5	Did Not Advance	
Axel Toni Steven Ngui	200 m freestyle	1:55.65	6	Did Not Advance	
Aldrich McKirdy	100 m butterfly	59.29	5	Did Not Advance	
Aldrich McKirdy	200 m butterfly	2:09.69	3 Q	2:09.74	8
Axel Toni Steven Ngui; Aldrich McKirdy; Jessie Lacuna; Jose Joaquin Gonzales	4 × 200 m freestyle	—N/a		7:41.78	5
Jose Joaquin Gonzales; Joshua Hall; Jessie Lacuna; Axel Toni Steven Ngui	4 × 100 m medley	—N/a		3:48.09	5

=== Women's ===
Athlete	Event	Heats		Final	
Athlete	Event	Time	Rank	Time	Rank
Jasmine Alkhaldi	50 m freestyle	26.07	2 Q	25.79	3rd place, bronze medalist(s)
Jasmine Alkhaldi	100 m freestyle	56.92	1 Q	56.10	3rd place, bronze medalist(s)
Jasmine Alkhaldi	200 m freestyle	2:06.18	1 Q	2:00.84	3rd place, bronze medalist(s)
Jasmine Alkhaldi	50 m butterfly	27.56	2 Q	27.47	3rd place, bronze medalist(s)
Jasmine Alkhaldi	100 m butterfly	1:02.76	2 Q	1:01.00	3rd place, bronze medalist(s)
Hannah Dato	50 m butterfly	28.46	3 Q	27.91	7
Hannah Dato	100 m butterfly	1:03.19	5 Q	1:01.94	7
Hannah Dato	200 m butterfly	2:19.92	5 Q	2:18.47	7
Hannah Dato	200 m individual medley	2:23.30	3 Q	2:21.65	5
Hannah Dato	400 m individual medley	5:06.20	3 Q	5:00.96	4
Raissa Regatta Gavino	50 m breaststroke	34.30	5	Did Not Advance	
Raissa Regatta Gavino	100 m breaststroke	1:15.08	4	Did Not Advance	
Raissa Regatta Gavino	200 m breaststroke	2:40.18	2 Q	2:43.12	8
Elizabeth Jordana	50 m backstroke	30.67	5	30.29	7
Elizabeth Jordana	100 m backstroke	1:05.66	4 Q	1:05.94	8
Elizabeth Jordana	200 m backstroke	—N/a		2:19.35	4
Rosalee Santa Ana	200 m freestyle	2:08.06	1 Q	2:10.87	8
Rosalee Santa Ana	400 m freestyle	4:33.19	5	Did Not Advance	
Rosalee Santa Ana	800 m freestyle	—N/a		9:21:81	7
Imelda Corazon Wistey	50 m breaststroke	33.46	3 Q	33.99	7
Imelda Corazon Wistey	200 m breaststroke	2:46.42	5	Did Not Advance	
Imelda Corazon Wistey	100 m breaststroke	1:13.06	2 Q	1:13.69	8
Roxanne Ashley Yu	50 m backstroke	31.04	4	Did Not Advance	
Roxanne Ashley Yu	100 m backstroke	1:05.03	1 Q	1:04.80	3rd place, bronze medalist(s)
Roxanne Ashley Yu	200 m backstroke	—N/a		2:18.45	3rd place, bronze medalist(s)
Hannah Dato; Elizabeth Jordana; Roxanne Ashley Yu; Jasmine Alkhaldi	4 × 100 m freestyle	—N/a		3:53.57	4
Hannah Dato; Roxanne Ashley Yu; Imelda Corazon Wistey; Jasmine Alkhaldi	4 × 100 m medley	—N/a		4:16.19	3rd place, bronze medalist(s)

== Synchronized swimming ==
Athlete	Event	Technical Routine		Free Routine (Preliminary)			Free Routine (Final)	
Athlete	Event	Points	Rank	Points	Subtotal (Preliminary)	Rank	Points	Rank
Allyssa Marey Salvador; Jemimah Nissi Tiambeng	Duet	43.7238	8	54.2667	97.9905	8	53.0333	8

== Table tennis ==
=== Singles and team ===
Athlete	Event	Preliminary round		Semifinal	Final	Rank
Athlete	Event	Round Robin	Rank	Semifinal	Final	Rank
Richard Gonzales	Men's singles	Thavisack Phathaphone (LAO); W 3 – 0	1 Q	Chew Zhe Yu Clarence (SIN); W 4 – 3	Gao Ning (SIN); L 1 – 4	2nd place, silver medalist(s)
Richard Gonzales	Men's singles	Ficky Supit Santoso (INA); W 3 – 2	1 Q	Chew Zhe Yu Clarence (SIN); W 4 – 3	Gao Ning (SIN); L 1 – 4	2nd place, silver medalist(s)
Richard Gonzales	Men's singles	Tran Tuan Quynh (VIE); W 3 - 0	1 Q	Chew Zhe Yu Clarence (SIN); W 4 – 3	Gao Ning (SIN); L 1 – 4	2nd place, silver medalist(s)
Richard Gonzales	Men's singles	R. Muhamad A. H. Muhamad (MAS); W 3 - 0	1 Q	Chew Zhe Yu Clarence (SIN); W 4 – 3	Gao Ning (SIN); L 1 – 4	2nd place, silver medalist(s)
Rodney Jacolo	Men's singles	Padasak Tanviriyavechakul (THA); L 0 – 3	4	Did Not Advance		
Rodney Jacolo	Men's singles	Le Tien Dat (VIE); L 0 – 3	4	Did Not Advance		
Rodney Jacolo	Men's singles	Lat Thet Ko Ko (MYA); L 3 – 4	4	Did Not Advance		
Sendrina Andrea Balatbat	Women's singles	Hoang My Trang Mai (VIE); L 0 – 3	3	Did Not Advance		
Sendrina Andrea Balatbat	Women's singles	Lee Rou You (MAS); L 1 – 3	3	Did Not Advance		
Sendrina Andrea Balatbat	Women's singles	Thipphalak Sannivad (LAO); W 3 – 0	3	Did Not Advance		
Ian Lariba	Women's singles	Feng Tianwei (SIN); L 0 – 3	3	Did Not Advance		
Ian Lariba	Women's singles	Suthasini Sawettabut (THA); L 1 – 3	3	Did Not Advance		
Ian Lariba	Women's singles	Novita Oktariyani (INA); W 3 – 0	3	Did Not Advance		
Richard Gonzales; Rodney Jacolo; Rodel Irineo Valle	Men's team	Cambodia; W 3 – 1	4	Did Not Advance		
Richard Gonzales; Rodney Jacolo; Rodel Irineo Valle	Men's team	Indonesia; L 1 – 3	4	Did Not Advance		
Richard Gonzales; Rodney Jacolo; Rodel Irineo Valle	Men's team	Thailand; L 1 – 3	4	Did Not Advance		
Richard Gonzales; Rodney Jacolo; Rodel Irineo Valle	Men's team	Vietnam	4	Did Not Advance		

=== Doubles ===
Athlete	Event	1/16 round	1/8 final	Quarterfinal	Semifinal	Final	Rank
Richard Gonzales; Rodel Irineo Valle	Men's	Wong Chun Cheun (MAS); Leong Chee Feng (MAS); W 3 – 1	Zhe Yu Clarence Chew (SIN); Chen Feng (SIN); L 1 – 3	Did Not Advance			
Ian Lariba; Sendrina Andrea Balatbat	Women's	Gustin Dwijayanti (INA); Kharisma Nur Hawwa (INA); L 2 – 3	Did Not Advance				
Ian Lariba; Rodel Irineo Valle	Mixed	Suthasini Sawettabut (THA); Padasak Tanviriyavechakul (THA); L 0 – 3	Did Not Advance				
Sendrina Andrea Balatbat; Richard Gonzales	Mixed	Thavisack Phathaphone (LAO); Seangdavieng Douangpanya (LAO); W 3 – 2	Yang Zi (SIN); Yu Mengyu (SIN); L 0 – 3	Did Not Advance			

== Taekwondo ==
=== Men's ===
Athlete	Event	1/8 final	Quarterfinal	Semifinal	Final	Rank
Jenar Torillos	54 kg	—N/a	Dinh Cuong Nguyen (VIE); W 19 – 3	Muhammad Mohd Azri (MAS); L 13 – 14	Did Not Advance	3rd place, bronze medalist(s)
Francis Aaron Agojo	54 kg	—N/a	Heng Chan Ty (CAM); W 35 – 6	Junwei Tan Jason (SIN); W 20 – 13	Van Duy Nguyen (VIE); L 9 – 23	2nd place, silver medalist(s)
Samuel Thomas Harper Morrison	68 kg	—N/a	Argya Virangga (INA); W 25 – 11	Somsanouk Phommavanh (LAO); W 19 – 7	Trung Duc Phan (VIE); W 19 – 12	1st place, gold medalist(s)

=== Women's ===
Athlete	Event	1/8 final	Quarterfinal	Semifinal	Final	Rank
Irene Therese Bermejo	46 kg	—N/a	Nway Nway (MYA); W 16 – 7	Chew Xin Wei (SIN); W 29 – 5	Thi Kim Tuyen Truong (VIE); L 7 – 19	2nd place, silver medalist(s)
Levita Rona Ilao	49 kg	—N/a	Alisa Panyasyu (LAO); W 12 – 0	Chanatip Sonkham (THA); L 4 – 11	Did Not Advance	3rd place, bronze medalist(s)
Pauline Louise Lopez	57 kg	—N/a	—N/a	Sonesavanh Sirimanotham (LAO); W 21 – 2	Thi Thu Hien Pham (VIE); W 20 – 12	1st place, gold medalist(s)

=== Poomsae ===
Athlete	Event	Score	Rank
Rinna Babanto	Women's individual	7.480	2nd place, silver medalist(s)
Rinna Babanto; Juvenile Faye Crisostomo; Jocel Lyn Ninobla	Women's team	7.630	3rd place, bronze medalist(s)
Dustin Jacob Mella; Raphael Enrico Mella; Rodolfo Reyes Jr.	Men's team	7.850	1st place, gold medalist(s)

== Tennis ==
Athlete	Event	Round 1	Round 2	Quarter Final	Semi Final	Final	Rank
Athlete	Event	Opposition Result	Opposition Result	Opposition Result	Opposition Result	Opposition Result	Rank
Ruben Gonzales Jr.	Men's singles	Trinh Linh Giang (VIE); W 2 – 0	Kittiphong Wachiramanowong (THA); L 2 – 0	Did Not Advance			
Jeson Patrombon	Men's singles	Bye	Muhammad Zainal Abidin (MAS); W 2 – 0	Christopher Rungkat (INA); W 2 – 0	Warit Sornbutnark (THA); L 0 – 2	Did Not Advance	3rd place, bronze medalist(s)
Ruben Gonzales Jr. Jeson Patrombon	Men's doubles	—N/a	Hoang Nguyen (VIE); Minh Tuan Pham (VIE); W 2 – 0	Aditya Sasongko (INA); David Susanto (INA); W 2 – 0	Warit Sornbutnark (THA); Kittiphong Wachiramanowong (THA); W 2 – 1	Sanchai Ratiwatana (THA); Sonchat Ratiwatana (THA); L 0 – 2	2nd place, silver medalist(s)
Treat Conrad Huey; Francis Casey Alcantara	Men's doubles	—N/a	Sherwin Shi Yun Foo (SIN); Muhammad Meqsud Alam (SIN); W 2 – 0	Christopher Rungkat (INA); Sunu Wahyu Trijati (INA); W 2 – 1	Sanchai Ratiwatana (THA); Sonchat Ratiwatana (THA); L 1 – 2	Did Not Advance	3rd place, bronze medalist(s)
Anna Clarice Patrimonio	Women's singles	Bye	Nilar Win (MYA); W 2 – 0	Noppawan Lertcheewakarn (THA); L 0 – 2	Did Not Advance		
Katharina Melissa Lehnert	Women's singles	Bye	Li Yun Stefanie Tan (SIN); W 2 – 0	Phonephathep Philavong (LAO); W 2 – 0	Varatchaya Wongteanchai (THA); L 0 – 2	Did Not Advance	3rd place, bronze medalist(s)
Denise Dy; Katharina Melissa Lehnert	Women's doubles	—N/a	Li Yun Stefanie (SIN); Yen Wee Khee (SIN); W 2 – 0	Ayu Damayanti (INA); Lavinia Tananta (INA); W 2 – 0	Tamarine Tanasugarn (THA); Peangtarn Plipuech (THA); W 2 – 1	Noppawan Lertcheewakarn (THA); Varatchaya Wongteanchai (THA); L 0 – 2	2nd place, silver medalist(s)
Khim Iglupas; Anna Clarice Patrimonio	Women's doubles	—N/a	Theivija Selva Rajoo (MAS); Yus Syazlin Yusri (MAS); L 1 – 2	Did Not Advance			
Khim Iglupas; Francis Casey Alcantara	Mixed doubles	Amy Tun (MYA); Aung Naing (MYA); W 2 – 0	Peangtarn Plipuech (THA); Sonchat Ratiwatana (THA); L 2 – 0	Did Not Advance			
Denise Dy; Treat Conrad Huey	Mixed doubles	Bye	Yin Thuzar Lwin (MYA); Paing Soe Oo (MYA); W 2 – 0	Aditya Sasongko (INA); Ayu Damayanti (INA); W 2 – 0	Tamarine Tanasugarn (THA); Sanchai Ratiwatana (THA); W 2 – 0	Peangtarn Plipuech (THA); Sonchat Ratiwatana (THA); W 2 – 0	1st place, gold medalist(s)
Treat Conrad Huey; Francis Casey Alcantara; Ruben Gonzales Jr. Jeson Patrombon	Men's team	—N/a	Bye	Cambodia; W 3 – 0	Indonesia; L 1 – 2	Did Not Advance	3rd place, bronze medalist(s)
Katharina Melissa Lehnert; Khim Iglupas; Anna Clarice Patrimonio; Denise Dy	Women's team	—N/a		Vietnam; W 2 – 1	Indonesia; W 2 – 1	Thailand; L 1 – 2	2nd place, silver medalist(s)

== Traditional Boat Race ==
Team	Event	Preliminary		Final	
Team	Event	Time	Rank	Time	Rank
Leo Bumagat; Ojay Fuentes; Dany Funelas; Alex Generalo; Alvin Generalo; Hermie Macaranas; Daniel Ortega; John Paul Selencio	6-man 200 m	1:04.570	3 Q	1:03.025	5
Leo Bumagat; Ojay Fuentes; Dany Funelas; Alex Generalo; Alvin Generalo; Hermie Macaranas; Daniel Ortega; John Paul Selencio	6-man 500 m	2:41.260	5 Q	2:46.917	4
Leo Bumagat; Fernan Dungan; Ojay Fuentes; Dany Funelas; Alex Generalo; Alvin Generalo; Hermie Macaranas; Oliver Manaig; Kevin Mendoza; Daniel Ortega; Jonathan Ruz; John Paul Selencio; Michael Selencio; Christian Urso	12-man 200 m	57.404	2 Q	55.144	5
Leo Bumagat; Fernan Dungan; Ojay Fuentes; Dany Funelas; Alex Generalo; Alvin Generalo; Hermie Macaranas; Oliver Manaig; Kevin Mendoza; Daniel Ortega; Jonathan Ruz; John Paul Selencio; Michael Selencio; Christian Urso	12-man 500 m	2:24.054	2 Q	2:25.223	5
Raquel Almencion; Patricia Ann Bustamante; Maribeth Caranto; Rosalyn Esguerra; Rea Glore; Glaiza Liwag; Maria Eucelia Manatad; Ella Fe Niuda	6-woman 200 m	1:09.357	1 Q	1:07.992	3rd place, bronze medalist(s)
Raquel Almencion; Patricia Ann Bustamante; Maribeth Caranto; Rosalyn Esguerra; Rea Glore; Glaiza Liwag; Maria Eucelia Manatad; Ella Fe Niuda	6-woman 500 m	2:58.878	4 Q	3:02.798	5

== Triathlon ==
=== Men's ===
Athlete	Event	Swim (1.5 km)	Trans 1	Bike (40 km)	Trans 2	Run (10 km)	Total Time	Rank
Nikko Huelgas	Men's	20:27	0:28	1:04:31	0:22	38:43	2:04:32	1st place, gold medalist(s)
Jonard Saim	Men's	20:38	0:34	1:04:15	0:22	44:28	2:10:18	6

=== Women's ===
Athlete	Event	Swim (1.5 km)	Trans 1	Bike (40 km)	Trans 2	Run (10 km)	Total Time	Rank
Ma. Claire Adorna	Women's	18:45	0:34	1:05:14	0:28	48:05	2:13:08	1st place, gold medalist(s)
Kim Mangrobang	Women's	20:19	0:31	1:07:35	0:23	45:36	2:14:26	2nd place, silver medalist(s)

== Volleyball ==
=== Men's ===
Squad list	Preliminary round		Semis	Final	Rank
Squad list	Round Robin	Rank	Semis	Final	Rank
Edward Camposano (OH); Marck Espejo (OH/OPP); Kheeno Franco (MB); John Vic de Guzman (MB); Rex Intal (MB); Ysrael Marasigan (OPP); Sandy Montero (L); Andre Joseph Pareja (OH) (Captain); Ish Polvoroza (S); Timmy Santo Tomas (S); Peter Den Mar Torres (MB); Joshua Alexis Miguel Villanueva (MB)	Malaysia; W 3 – 1; 20 – 25, 25 – 23, 25 – 18, 25 – 19	3	Did Not Advance		6
Edward Camposano (OH); Marck Espejo (OH/OPP); Kheeno Franco (MB); John Vic de Guzman (MB); Rex Intal (MB); Ysrael Marasigan (OPP); Sandy Montero (L); Andre Joseph Pareja (OH) (Captain); Ish Polvoroza (S); Timmy Santo Tomas (S); Peter Den Mar Torres (MB); Joshua Alexis Miguel Villanueva (MB)	Myanmar; L 0 – 3; 16 – 25, 14 – 25, 31 – 33	3	Did Not Advance		6
Edward Camposano (OH); Marck Espejo (OH/OPP); Kheeno Franco (MB); John Vic de Guzman (MB); Rex Intal (MB); Ysrael Marasigan (OPP); Sandy Montero (L); Andre Joseph Pareja (OH) (Captain); Ish Polvoroza (S); Timmy Santo Tomas (S); Peter Den Mar Torres (MB); Joshua Alexis Miguel Villanueva (MB)	Thailand; L 0 – 3; 21 – 25, 16 – 25, 13 – 25	3	Did Not Advance		6

=== Women's ===
Squad list	Preliminary round		Semis	Final	Rank
Squad list	Round Robin	Rank	Semis	Final	Rank
Rhea Dimaculangan (S); Rachel Daquis (OH); Jovelyn Gonzaga (OPP) (Captain); Denden Lazaro (L); Dindin Santiago-Manabat (MB/OPP); Aby Maraño(MB); Jia Morado (S); Maika Angela Ortiz (MB); Aiza Maizo-Pontillas (OPP) (Reserve); Alyja Daphne Santiago (MB); Gretchel Soltones (OH); Alyssa Valdez (OH)	Indonesia; L 0 – 3; 22 – 25, 20 – 25, 14 – 25	3	Did Not Advance		5
Rhea Dimaculangan (S); Rachel Daquis (OH); Jovelyn Gonzaga (OPP) (Captain); Denden Lazaro (L); Dindin Santiago-Manabat (MB/OPP); Aby Maraño(MB); Jia Morado (S); Maika Angela Ortiz (MB); Aiza Maizo-Pontillas (OPP) (Reserve); Alyja Daphne Santiago (MB); Gretchel Soltones (OH); Alyssa Valdez (OH)	Malaysia; W 3 – 0; 25 – 15, 25 – 18, 25 – 16	3	Did Not Advance		5
Rhea Dimaculangan (S); Rachel Daquis (OH); Jovelyn Gonzaga (OPP) (Captain); Denden Lazaro (L); Dindin Santiago-Manabat (MB/OPP); Aby Maraño(MB); Jia Morado (S); Maika Angela Ortiz (MB); Aiza Maizo-Pontillas (OPP) (Reserve); Alyja Daphne Santiago (MB); Gretchel Soltones (OH); Alyssa Valdez (OH)	Vietnam; L 0 – 3; 16 – 25, 21 – 25, 23 – 25	3	Did Not Advance		5

== Water Polo ==
=== Men's ===
Squad list	Preliminary round		Final	Rank
Squad list	Round Robin	Rank	Final	Rank
Mummar Alamara; Norton Alamara; Abnel Amiladjid; Mico Anota; Romark Johnson Belo; Tani Gomez Jr. Adan Gonzales; Macgyver Reyes; Reynaldo Salonga Jr. Wilfredo Sunglao Jr. Mark Jerwin Valdez; Matthew Royce Yu	Indonesia; L 6 — 22	5	Did Not Advance	
Mummar Alamara; Norton Alamara; Abnel Amiladjid; Mico Anota; Romark Johnson Belo; Tani Gomez Jr. Adan Gonzales; Macgyver Reyes; Reynaldo Salonga Jr. Wilfredo Sunglao Jr. Mark Jerwin Valdez; Matthew Royce Yu	Malaysia; L 4 – 10	5	Did Not Advance	
Mummar Alamara; Norton Alamara; Abnel Amiladjid; Mico Anota; Romark Johnson Belo; Tani Gomez Jr. Adan Gonzales; Macgyver Reyes; Reynaldo Salonga Jr. Wilfredo Sunglao Jr. Mark Jerwin Valdez; Matthew Royce Yu	Thailand; L 6 – 10	5	Did Not Advance	
Mummar Alamara; Norton Alamara; Abnel Amiladjid; Mico Anota; Romark Johnson Belo; Tani Gomez Jr. Adan Gonzales; Macgyver Reyes; Reynaldo Salonga Jr. Wilfredo Sunglao Jr. Mark Jerwin Valdez; Matthew Royce Yu	Singapore; L 2 – 23	5	Did Not Advance	

=== Women's ===
Squad list	Preliminary round		Final	Rank
Squad list	Round Robin	Rank	Final	Rank
Lyllian Grace Banzon; Trixia Paulette Caguitla; Lia Trisha Co; Krystal Rae Dela Cruz; Daniella Camyl Evangelista; Danyca Kloie Evangelista; Dara Clariza Evangelista; Dea Felise Garrido; Carla Beatrice Grabador; Christine Grace Hipol; Jobelyn Ocampo; Kunti Dasi Tibby; Santi Dasi Tibby	Malaysia; L 6 – 7	5	Did Not Advance	
Lyllian Grace Banzon; Trixia Paulette Caguitla; Lia Trisha Co; Krystal Rae Dela Cruz; Daniella Camyl Evangelista; Danyca Kloie Evangelista; Dara Clariza Evangelista; Dea Felise Garrido; Carla Beatrice Grabador; Christine Grace Hipol; Jobelyn Ocampo; Kunti Dasi Tibby; Santi Dasi Tibby	Singapore; L 2 – 20	5	Did Not Advance	
Lyllian Grace Banzon; Trixia Paulette Caguitla; Lia Trisha Co; Krystal Rae Dela Cruz; Daniella Camyl Evangelista; Danyca Kloie Evangelista; Dara Clariza Evangelista; Dea Felise Garrido; Carla Beatrice Grabador; Christine Grace Hipol; Jobelyn Ocampo; Kunti Dasi Tibby; Santi Dasi Tibby	Thailand; L 1 – 10	5	Did Not Advance	
Lyllian Grace Banzon; Trixia Paulette Caguitla; Lia Trisha Co; Krystal Rae Dela Cruz; Daniella Camyl Evangelista; Danyca Kloie Evangelista; Dara Clariza Evangelista; Dea Felise Garrido; Carla Beatrice Grabador; Christine Grace Hipol; Jobelyn Ocampo; Kunti Dasi Tibby; Santi Dasi Tibby	Indonesia; L 6 – 20	5	Did Not Advance	

== Waterski ==
Athlete	Event	Preliminary		Last Chance		Finals	
Athlete	Event	Score	Rank	Score	Rank	Score	Rank
Angelo Louise Linao	Men's jump	—N/a				–	5
Angelo Louise Linao	Men's slalom	0.0/0/52/18.00	7	—N/a		Did Not Advance	
Angelo Louise Linao	Men's Wakeboard Team	41.67	5	LC; 52.78; 1 Q	Semifinals; 54.22; 4	Did Not Advance	
Angelo Louise Linao	Men's Wakeboard	51.67	4	47.00	4	Did Not Advance	
Mark Howard Griffin	Men's Wakeboard Team	63.56	2 Q	Semifinals; 65.11	2 Q	73.45	3rd place, bronze medalist(s)
Mark Howard Griffin	Men's Wakeboard	68.33	1 Q	—N/a		69.00	3rd place, bronze medalist(s)
Maiquel Jawn Selga	Women's Wakeboard Team	27.56	2	24.34	2 Q	30.00	5
Maiquel Jawn Selga	Women's Wakeboard	34.44	2 Q	—N/a		30.89	3rd place, bronze medalist(s)
Maiquel Jawn Selga; Mark Howard Griffin; Angelo Louise Linao	Mixed Wakeboard Team	—N/a				140	3rd place, bronze medalist(s)

== Wushu ==
=== Men's taolu ===
Athlete	Event	Score	Rank
Daniel Parantac	Taijiquan	9.70	2nd place, silver medalist(s)
Daniel Parantac	Taijijian	9.71	1st place, gold medalist(s)
Spencer Bahod	Compulsory Taijiquan	8.91	7
John Keithley Chan	Changquan	9.64	6
Norlence Ardee Catolico	Changquan	9.48	9
Norlence Ardee Catolico	Broadsword	9.29	10
Norlence Ardee Catolico	Cudgel	9.64	9
Dave Degala	Broadsword	Did Not Start	
Thornton Quieney Lou Sayan	Nanquan+Nangun	9.50 (8); 8.78 (10)	18.28 (10)
Thornton Quieney Lou Sayan; Alieson Ken Omengan; Spencer Bahod	Duel - Barehand	9.68	2nd place, silver medalist(s)
Daniel Parantac; John Keithley Chan; Norlence Ardee Catolico	Duel - Weapons	9.70	2nd place, silver medalist(s)

=== Men's sanda ===
Athlete	Event	Round of 16	Quarterfinal	Semifinal	Final	Rank
Francisco Solis	60 kg	Bye	Ko Chit Ko (MYA); W 2 – 0	Hendrick Tarigan (INA); W 2 – 0	Van Cao hoang (VIE); L 0 – 2	2nd place, silver medalist(s)
Clemente Tabugara Jr.	65 kg	Bye	Kalanh Khotsombath (LAO); W 2 – 0	Nguyen Van Tai (VIE); L 0 – 2	Did Not Advance	3rd place, bronze medalist(s)

=== Women's taolu ===
Athlete	Event	Score	Rank
Agatha Chrystenzen Wong	Compulsory Taijiquan	9.05	7
Kariza Kris Chan; Natasha Enriquez	Duel - Weapons	9.62	5
