= Francisco Dela Cruz =

Northern Mariana Islands politician

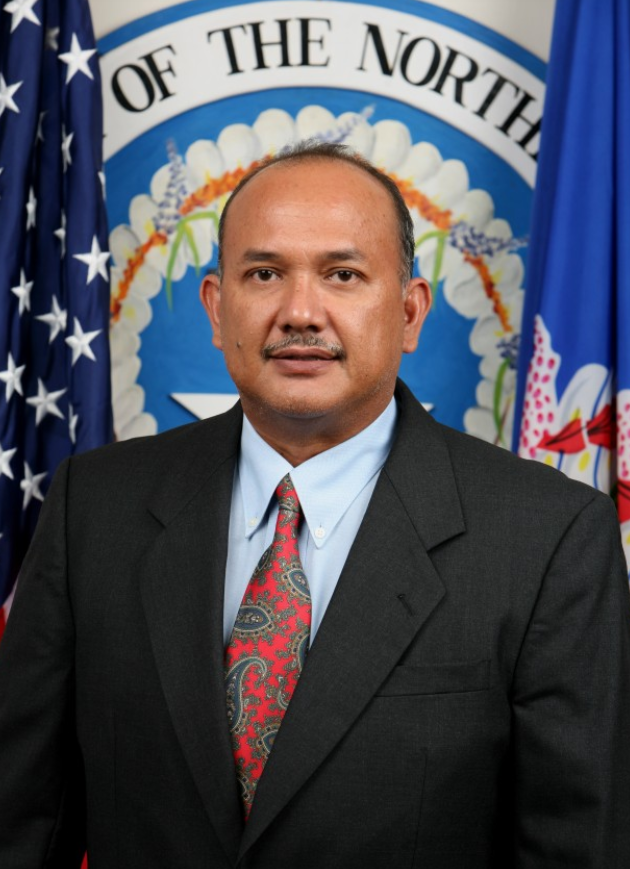
Headshot of Dela Cruz (2010)

Francisco "Frank" Santos Dela Cruz (March 29, 1962 – January 6, 2019) was a politician who served as a Republican member of the Northern Mariana Islands House of Representatives.

== Early life ==
Dela Cruz served in the Northern Mariana Islands House of Representatives from 2006 to 2014 and was a Republican. Dela Cruz died suddenly of a heart attack on the island of Tinian, Northern Mariana Islands, while visiting his family with his wife.
