= Canoeing at the 2015 SEA Games =

- Venue: Marina Channel
- Dates: 6–9 June 2015
- Competitors: 109 from 8 nations

Canoeing at the 2015 SEA Games was held at the Marina Channel, Singapore from 6 to 9 June 2015.

== Participating nations ==
A total of 109 athletes from eight nations is being competing in canoeing at the 2015 SEA Games:

- Cambodia (2)
- Indonesia (19)
- Malaysia (17)
- Myanmar (19)
- Philippines (3)
- Singapore (19)
- Thailand (19)
- Vietnam (11)

== Competition schedule ==
The following is the competition schedule for the canoeing competitions:

F	Final

Event↓/Date →	Sat 6	Sun 7	Mon 8	Tue 9
Men's C-1 200 metres				F
Men's C-1 1000 metres	F			
Men's C-2 200 metres				F
Men's C-2 1000 metres	F			
Men's K-1 200 metres				F
Men's K-1 1000 metres	F			
Men's K-2 200 metres				F
Men's K-2 1000 metres	F			
Men's K-4 200 metres				F
Men's K-4 1000 metres	F			
Women's C-1 200 metres				F
Women's K-1 200 metres				F
Women's K-1 500 metres			F	
Women's K-2 200 metres				F
Women's K-2 500 metres			F	
Women's K-4 200 metres				F
Women's K-4 500 metres			F	

== Medalists ==
=== Men ===
Event	Gold	Silver	Bronze
C-1 200 m	Spens Stuber Mehue; Indonesia	Maung Maung; Myanmar	Hermie Macaranas; Philippines
C-1 1000 m	Marjuki; Indonesia	Oo Thant Zin; Myanmar	Hermie Macaranas; Philippines
C-2 200 m	Myanmar; Maung Maung; Win Htike	Singapore; Chong Koi Kiat; Tan Chin Chuen	Philippines; Ojay Fuentes; Hermie Macaranas
C-2 1000 m	Myanmar; Win Htike; Wai Sai Min	Indonesia; Muhammad Yunus; Anwar Tarra	Philippines; Ojay Fuentes; Hermie Macaranas
K-1 200 m	Mervyn Toh; Singapore	Aditep Srichart; Thailand	Gandie; Indonesia
K-1 1000 m	Lucas Teo; Singapore	Wichan Jaitieng; Thailand	Thu Aung Myo; Myanmar
K-2 200 m	Indonesia; Gandie; Mugi Harjito	Singapore; Md Syaheenul Aiman Nasiman; Mervyn Toh	Thailand; Chatkamon Maneejak; Chanrit Chakkhian
K-2 1000 m	Singapore; Brandon Ooi; Bill Lee	Thailand; Chatkamon Maneejak; Chanrit Chakkhian	Indonesia; Andri Sugiarto; Chandra Destia Nugraha
K-4 200 m	Thailand; Anusorn Sommit; Aditep Srichart; Nathaworn Waenphrom; Kasemsit Borriboonwasin	Singapore; Md Syaheenul Aiman Nasiman; Bill Lee; Jori Lim; Brandon Ooi	Indonesia; Maizir Riyondra; Sutrisno; Asep Hidayat; Andri Sugiarto
K-4 1000 m	Thailand; Anusorn Sommit; Piyaphan Phaophat; Nathaworn Waenphrom; Kasemsit Borriboonwasin	Indonesia; Maizir Riyondra; Sutrisno; Asep Hidayat; Dedi Kurniawan Suyanto	Myanmar; Sha Saw Kay; Latt Zaw Wai; Tun Yazar; Ko Myint Ko

=== Women ===
Event	Gold	Silver	Bronze
C-1 200 m	Trương Thị Phương; Vietnam	Orasa Thiangkathok; Thailand	Riska Andriyani; Indonesia
K-1 200 m	Sarah Chen; Singapore	Erni Sokoy; Indonesia	Đỗ Thị Thanh Thảo; Vietnam
K-1 500 m	Stephenie Chen; Singapore	Erni Sokoy; Indonesia	Vũ Thị Linh; Vietnam
K-2 200 m	Thailand; Woraporn Boonyuhong; Kanokpan Suansan	Singapore; Stephenie Chen; Suzanne Seah	Vietnam; Đỗ Thị Thanh Thảo; Vũ Thị Linh
K-2 500 m	Singapore; Stephenie Chen; Suzanne Seah	Thailand; Woraporn Boonyuhong; Kanokpan Suansan	Indonesia; Masripah; Erni Sokoy
K-4 200 m	Thailand; Chayanin Sripadung; Porncharus Yamprasert; Kanokpan Suansan; Woraporn Boonyuhong	Singapore; Geraldine Lee; Soh Sze Ying; Annabelle Ng; Sarah Chen	Indonesia; Erni Sokoy; Masripah; Riska Elpia Ramadani; Yunita Kadop
K-4 500 m	Singapore; Geraldine Lee; Soh Sze Ying; Annabelle Ng; Sarah Chen	Thailand; Chayanin Sripadung; Porncharus Yamprasert; Thanyaluk Aoenthachai; Varipan Chocngamwong	Vietnam; Nguyễn Thị Hải Yến; Đỗ Thị Thanh Thảo; Ma Thị Tuyết; Dương Thị Bích Loan

== Medal table ==
* Host nation (Singapore)

Rank	Nation	Gold	Silver	Bronze	Total
1	Singapore (SIN)*	7	5	0	12
2	Thailand (THA)	4	6	1	11
3	Indonesia (INA)	3	4	6	13
4	Myanmar (MYA)	2	2	2	6
5	Vietnam (VIE)	1	0	4	5
6	Philippines (PHI)	0	0	4	4
Totals (6 entries)		17	17	17	51
