= Canoeing at the 2015 SEA Games – Men's C-2 1000 metres =

Canoeing – Men's C-2 1000 metres at the 2015 SEA Games
- Venue: Marina Channel
- Date: 6 June 2015
- Competitors: 8 from 4 nations

Medalists
gold medal	Htike Win; Wai Sai Min	Myanmar
silver medal	Tarra Anwar; Yunus Muhammad	Indonesia
bronze medal	Fuentes Ojay; Macaranas Hermie	Philippines

The men's C-2 1000 metres competition of the canoeing event at the 2015 SEA Games was held on 6 June 2015 at the Marina Channel in Singapore.

== Schedule ==
All times are Singapore Standard Time (UTC+08:00)

Date	Time	Event
Saturday, 6 June 2015	09:45	Final

== Results ==
Source: Results - Men's C2-1000m Final

Rank	Rowers	Country	Time
1st place, gold medalist(s)	Htike Win; Wai Sai Min	Myanmar (MYA)	3:43.814
2nd place, silver medalist(s)	Tarra Anwar; Yunus Muhammad	Indonesia (INA)	3:44.950
3rd place, bronze medalist(s)	Fuentes Ojay; Macaranas Hermie	Philippines (PHI)	3:58.377
4	Hongkaeo Wittaya; Porananon Yutthana	Thailand (THA)	3:59.337
