= Canoeing at the 2015 SEA Games – Men's C-1 1000 metres =

Canoeing – Men's C-1 1000 metres at the 2015 SEA Games
- Venue: Marina Channel
- Date: 6 June 2015
- Competitors: 7 from 7 nations

Medalists
| gold medal | Marjuki Marjuki | Indonesia |
| silver medal | Oo Thant Zin | Myanmar |
| bronze medal | Macaranas Hermie | Philippines |

The men's C-1 1000 metres competition of the canoeing event at the 2015 Southeast Asian Games was held on 6 June 2015 at the Marina Channel in Singapore.

== Schedule ==
All times are Singapore Standard Time (UTC+08:00)

| Date | Time | Event |
|---|---|---|
| Saturday, 6 June 2015 | 09:15 | Final |

== Results ==
=== Final ===
Source: Results - Men's C1-1000m Final

| Rank | Athletes | Time |
|---|---|---|
| 1st place, gold medalist(s) | Marjuki Marjuki (INA) | 4:02.349 |
| 2nd place, silver medalist(s) | Oo Thant Zin (MYA) | 4:06.707 |
| 3rd place, bronze medalist(s) | Macaranas Hermie (PHI) | 4:08.294 |
| 4 | Trần Xuân Đạt (VIE) | 4:15.427 |
| 5 | Chong Koi Kiat (SIN) | 4:25.439 |
| 6 | Charumkhruea Arthit (THA) | 4:31.833 |
| 7 | Horl Lyda (CAM) | 4:48.302 |
