= Swimming at the 2015 SEA Games – Men's 100 metre breaststroke =

Swimming – Men's 100 metre breaststroke at the 2015 SEA Games
- Venue: OCBC Aquatic Centre
- Date: 7 June 2015
- Competitors: 10 from 7 nations

Medalists
gold medal	Wong Fu Kang	Malaysia
silver medal	Radomyos Matjiur	Thailand
bronze medal	Joshua Hall	Philippines

The men's 100 metre breaststroke competition of the swimming event at the 2015 SEA Games was held on 7 June at the OCBC Aquatic Centre in Kallang, Singapore.

== Records ==
Prior to this competition, the existing Asian and Games records were as follows:

Asian record	Kitajima Kosuke (JPN)	58.90	Tokyo, Japan	3 April 2012
Games record	Nguyễn Hữu Việt (VIE)	1:01.60	Vientiane, Laos	11 December 2009

== Schedule ==
All times are Singapore Standard Time (UTC+08:00)

Date	Time	Event
Sunday, 7 June 2015	09:05	Heat 1
Sunday, 7 June 2015	09:06	Heat 2
Sunday, 7 June 2015	19:44	Final

== Results ==
KEY:	q	Fastest non-qualifiers	Q	Qualified	GR	Games record	NR	National record	PB	Personal best	SB	Seasonal best

=== Heats ===
Source: Heats results summary

The heats were held on 7 June.

==== Heat 1 ====
Source: Heat 1 results

Heat 1 was held on 7 June.

Rank	Lane	Athletes	Time	Notes
1	4	Wong Fu Kang (MAS)	1:03.32	Q
2	6	Dennis Josua Tiwa (INA)	1:04.28	Q
3	5	Indra Gunawan (INA)	1:04.74	Q
4	3	Christopher Cheong Ee Hong (SIN)	1:05.84	Q
5	2	Hem Thonponloeu (CAM)	1:13.27	

==== Heat 2 ====
Source: Heat 2 results

Heat 2 was held on 7 June.

Rank	Lane	Athletes	Time	Notes
1	3	Khoo Chien Yin Lionel (SIN)	1:02.87	Q
2	4	Joshua Hall (PHI)	1:03.34	Q
3	5	Radomyos Matjiur (THA)	1:04.08	Q
4	6	Shaun Yap Kah Choon (MAS)	1:04.60	Q
5	2	Phan Gia Mẫn (VIE)	1:09.28	

=== Final ===
Source: Final Results

The final was held on 7 June.

Rank	Lane	Athletes	Time	Notes
1st place, gold medalist(s)	5	Wong Fu Kang (MAS)	1:02.46	NR
2nd place, silver medalist(s)	6	Radomyos Matjiur (THA)	1:02.63	
3rd place, bronze medalist(s)	3	Joshua Hall (PHI)	1:02.87	
4	4	Khoo Chien Yin Lionel (SIN)	1:03.40	
5	1	Indra Gunawan (INA)	1:03.54	
6	2	Dennis Josua Tiwa (INA)	1:03.78	
7	8	Christopher Cheong Ee Hong (SIN)	1:04.44	
8	7	Shaun Yap Kah Choon (MAS)	1:04.97	
