= Shooting at the 2015 SEA Games =

- Venue: SAFRA Yishun; National Shooting Centre (Outdoors)
- Dates: 6 to 12 June 2015
- Competitors: 155 from 8 nations

Shooting at the 2015 SEA Games was held at the SAFRA Yishun Indoor Shooting Range and National Shooting Centre, Singapore from 6 to 12 June 2015.

== Participating nations ==
A total of 155 athletes from eight nations will be competing in shooting at the 2015 Southeast Asian Games:

- Indonesia (3)
- Laos (7)
- Malaysia (29)
- Myanmar (15)
- Philippines (15)
- Singapore (29)
- Thailand (32)
- Vietnam (25)

== Competition schedule ==
The following is the competition schedule for the shooting competitions:

== Medalists ==
=== Men ===
Event	Gold	Silver	Bronze
10 m air pistol	Trần Quốc Cường; Vietnam	Johnathan Wong; Malaysia	Hoàng Xuân Vinh; Vietnam
10 m air pistol team	Vietnam; Hoàng Xuân Vinh; Trần Quốc Cường; Nguyễn Hoàng Phương	Thailand; Natphanlert Auapinyakul; Kanitpong Gongkum; Noppadon Sutiviruch	Singapore; Gai Bin; Lim Swee Hon; Poh Lip Meng
50 m pistol	Hoàng Xuân Vinh; Vietnam	Natphanlert Auapinyakul; Thailand	Johnathan Wong; Malaysia
50 m pistol team	Singapore; Gai Bin; Lim Swee Hon; Poh Lip Meng	Vietnam; Hoàng Xuân Vinh; Nguyễn Hoàng Phương; Trần Quốc Cường	Myanmar; Ye Tun Naung; Kyaw Swar Win; Nay Htet Aung
10 m air rifle	Pongsaton Panyatong; Thailand	Napis Tortungpanich; Thailand	Jayson Valdez; Philippines
10 m air rifle team	Thailand; Pongsaton Panyatong; Napis Tortungpanich; Apichakli Ponglaokham	Malaysia; Mohd Zubair Mohammad; Muhammad Ezuan Nasir Khan; Mohd Hadafi Jaafar	Vietnam; Nguyễn Duy Hoàng; Nguyễn Văn Quân; Đào Minh Ngọc
50 m rifle prone	Supalerk Wijan; Thailand	Attapon Uea-aree; Thailand	Mohd Hadafi Jaafar; Malaysia
50 m rifle prone team	Thailand; Attapon Uea-aree; Supalerk Wijan; Tevarit Majchacheep	Singapore; Abel Lim; Ong Jun Hong; Lim Zhong Xian	Myanmar; Kaung Htike; Lin Aung; Wai Yan Min Thu
Skeet	Jiranunt Hathaichukiat; Thailand	Low Jiang Hao; Singapore	Pittipoom Phasee; Thailand
Skeet team	Thailand; Tanapat Jangpanich; Jiranunt Hathaichukiat; Pittipoom Phasee	Singapore; Low Jiang Hao; Eugene Chiew; David Chan	Malaysia; Gan Kong Leong; Amran Risman; Ricky Teh
Trap	Lê Nghĩa; Vietnam	Charles Chen; Malaysia	Zain Amat; Singapore
Trap team	Singapore; Zain Amat; Choo Choon Seng; Lin Hejun	Malaysia; Charles Chen; Ng Beng Chong; Bernard Yeoh	Philippines; Eric Ang; Hagen Alexander Topacio; Miguel David Laperal
Precision pistol	Thanawut Thammawai; Thailand	Anuar Abdullah; Singapore	Teh Kah Hoon; Singapore
Precision pistol team	Thailand; Boonthong Sowsa-nga; Thanawut Thammawai; Permphun Tapanya	Singapore; Anuar Abdullah; Sivakumar Velayudhan; Teh Kah Hoon	Philippines; Mar Udan; Jerome Jovanne Morales; Lamberto Espiritu

=== Women ===
Event	Gold	Silver	Bronze
10 m air pistol	Teo Shun Xie; Singapore	Pim-on Klaisuban; Thailand	Nguyễn Minh Châu; Vietnam
10 m air pistol team	Thailand; Phongpha Pholprajug; Tanyaporn Prucksakorn; Pim-on Klaisuban	Malaysia; Joseline Cheah; Bibiana Ng; Wahidah Ismail	Singapore; Teo Shun Xie; Nicole Tan; Teh Xiu Hong
25 m pistol	Alia Sazana Azahari; Malaysia	Teh Xiu Hong; Singapore	Lê Thị Hoàng Ngọc; Vietnam
25 m pistol team	Thailand; Kanyakorn Hirunphoem; Naphaswan Yangpaiboon; Tanyaporn Prucksakorn	Singapore; Teo Shun Xie; Nicole Tan; Teh Xiu Hong	Vietnam; Lê Thị Hoàng Ngọc; Phạm Thị Hà; Triệu Thị Hoa Hồng
10 m air rifle	Tessa Neo; Singapore	Jasmine Ser; Singapore	Nur Ayuni Farhana Abdul Halim; Malaysia
10 m air rifle team	Singapore; Jasmine Ser; Tessa Neo; Martina Veloso	Malaysia; Nur Suryani Taibi; Nur Ayuni Farhana Abdul Halim; Muslifah Zulkifli	Thailand; Sununta Majchacheep; Thanyalak Chotphibunsin; Supaluk Pimpan
50 m rifle 3 positions	Nur Ayuni Farhana Abdul Halim; Malaysia	Supamas Wankaew; Thailand	Nur Suryani Taibi; Malaysia
50 m rifle 3 positions team	Thailand; Sununta Majchacheep; Supamas Wankaew; Vitchuda Pichitkanjanakul	Malaysia; Nur Ayuni Farhana Abdul Halim; Nur Suryani Taibi; Muslifah Zulkifli	Singapore; Li Yafei; Jasmine Ser; Cheng Jian Huan
50 m rifle prone	Ratchadaporn Plengsaengthong; Thailand	Thanyalak Chotphibunsin; Thailand	Jasmine Ser; Singapore
50 m rifle prone team	Thailand; Thanyalak Chotphibunsin; Sununta Majchacheep; Ratchadaporn Plengsaengthong	Malaysia; Muslifah Zulkifli; Nur Ayuni Farhana Abdul Halim; Nur Suryani Taibi	Singapore; Li Yafei; Jasmine Ser; Cheng Jian Huan
Precision pistol	Elvie Baldivino; Philippines	Norizan Mustafa; Singapore	Pattarasuda Sowsa-nga; Thailand
Precision pistol team	Thailand; Pattarasuda Sowsa-nga; Angsana Niamrassamee; Rapassanan Tananamornpong	Philippines; Elvie Baldivino; Franchette Shayne Quiroz; Carmelita Guillermo	Malaysia; Norhidayah Mohd Fuad; Siti Zawiah Mohamed; Khoo Nee Hoe

== Medal table ==
* Host nation (Singapore)

Rank	Nation	Gold	Silver	Bronze	Total
1	Thailand (THA)	14	7	3	24
2	Singapore (SIN)*	5	9	7	21
3	Vietnam (VIE)	4	1	5	10
4	Malaysia (MAS)	2	8	6	16
5	Philippines (PHI)	1	1	3	5
6	Myanmar (MYA)	0	0	2	2
Totals (6 entries)		26	26	26	78
