= Canoeing at the 2015 SEA Games – Men's K-1 1000 metres =

Canoeing – Men's K-1 1000 metres at the 2015 SEA Games
- Venue: Marina Channel
- Date: 6 June 2015
- Competitors: 7 from 7 nations

Medalists
gold medal	Teo Guang Yi Lucas	Singapore
silver medal	Jaitieng Wichan	Thailand
bronze medal	Thu Aung Myo	Myanmar

The men's K-1 1000 metres competition of the canoeing event at the 2015 SEA Games was held on 6 June 2015 at the Marina Channel in Singapore.

== Schedule ==
All times are Singapore Standard Time (UTC+08:00)

Date	Time	Event
Saturday, 6 June 2015	09:30	Final

== Results ==
=== Final ===
Source: Results - Men's K1-1000m Final

Rank	Athletes	Time
1st place, gold medalist(s)	Teo Guang Yi Lucas (SIN)	3:43.036
2nd place, silver medalist(s)	Jaitieng Wichan (THA)	3:45.126
3rd place, bronze medalist(s)	Thu Aung Myo (MYA)	3:48.220
4	Amposta Marvin (PHI)	3:54.801
5	Riyondra Maizir (INA)	4:06.197
6	Abdul Jabar Ahmad Shafiee (MAS)	4:11.692
7	Ron Pherou (CAM)	4:34.988
