= Athletics at the 2015 SEA Games – Women's 10,000 metres =

The women's 10,000 metres at the 2015 SEA Games was held in National Stadium, Singapore. The track and field events took place on June 11.

== Schedule ==
All times are (UTC+08:00)

Date	Time	Event
Thursday, 11 June 2015	16:35	Final

== Records ==
Prior to this competition, the existing world, Asian, and Southeast Asian Games records were as follows.

World Record	Wang Junxia (CHN)	29:31.78	Beijing, China	8 September 1993
Asian Record	Wang Junxia (CHN)	29:31.78	Beijing, China	8 September 1993
Games Record	Triyaningsih (INA)	32:49.47	Vientiane, Laos	17 December 2009

== Results ==
Legend

- SB — Seasonal Best
- PB — Personal Best
- GR — Games Record

Rank	Athlete	Time	Note	
1st place, gold medalist(s)	Triyaningsih (INA)	33:44.53	SB	Video on YouTube Official Video
2nd place, silver medalist(s)	Pham Thi Hue (VIE)	35:02.70	PB	Video on YouTube Official Video
3rd place, bronze medalist(s)	Jane Vongvorachoti (THA)	35:20.46		Video on YouTube Official Video
4	Hoang Thi Thanh (VIE)	35:44.22	PB	Video on YouTube Official Video
5	Khin Mar Se (MYA)	36:22.76	PB	Video on YouTube Official Video
6	Pa Pa (MYA)	38:25.30		Video on YouTube Official Video
7	Mary Grace Delos Santos (PHI)	38:40.26		Video on YouTube Official Video
