= Swimming at the 2015 SEA Games – Men's 200 metre breaststroke =

Swimming – Men's 200 metre breaststroke at the 2015 SEA Games
- Venue: OCBC Aquatic Centre, Singapore Sports Hub
- Dates: 1–4 June 2015
- Competitors: 8 from 7 nations

Medalists
gold medal	Radomyos Matjiur	Thailand
silver medal	Lionel Khoo	Singapore
bronze medal	Christopher Cheong Ee Hong	Singapore

The men's 200 metre breaststroke competition of the swimming events at the 2015 SEA Games was held on 6 June at the OCBC Aquatic Centre in Singapore.

== Schedule ==
Date	Time	Event
Saturday, 6 June 2015	20:32	Final

== Records ==
Prior to this competition, the existing Asian and Games records were as follows:

Asian Record	Yamaguchi Akihiro (JPN)	2:07.01	Gifu, Japan	15 September 2012
Games Record	Nuttapong Ketin (THA)	2:12.99	Palembang, Indonesia	12 November 2011

== Results ==
KEY:	GR	Games record	NR	National record	PB	Personal best	SB	Seasonal best

=== Final ===
Source: Final Results

The final was held on 6 June.

Rank	Lane	Athletes	Time	Notes
1st place, gold medalist(s)	5	Radomyos Matjiur (THA)	2:14.83	
2nd place, silver medalist(s)	3	Khoo Chien Yin Lionel (SIN)	2:16.66	
3rd place, bronze medalist(s)	4	Christopher Cheong Ee Hong (SIN)	2:16.99	
4	1	Gagarin Nathaniel (INA)	2:18.35	
5	2	Wong Fu Kang (MAS)	2:18.51	
6	6	Dennis Josua Tiwa (INA)	2:19.25	
7	7	Phan Gia Man (VIE)	2:20.23	
8	8	Hem Thonponloeu (CAM)	2:40.14	
