= Canoeing at the 2015 SEA Games – Men's K-4 1000 metres =

Canoeing – Men's K-4 1000 metres at the 2015 SEA Games
- Venue: Marina Channel
- Date: 6 June 2015
- Competitors: 24 from 6 nations

Medalists
gold medal	Borriboonwasin Kasemsit; Phaophat Piyaphan; Sommit Anusorn; Waenphrom Nathaworn	Thailand
silver medal	Hidayat Asep; Riyondra Maizir; Sutrisno Sutrisno; Suyatno Dedi Kurniawan	Indonesia
bronze medal	Ko Myint Ko; Latt Zaw Wai; Sha Saw Kay; Tun Yazar	Myanmar

The men's K-4 1000 metres competition of the canoeing event at the 2015 SEA Games was held on 6 June 2015 at the Marina Channel in Singapore.

== Schedule ==
All times are Singapore Standard Time (UTC+08:00)

Date	Time	Event
Saturday, 6 June 2015	09:00	Final

== Results ==
Source: Results - Men's K4-1000m Final

Rank	Rowers	Country	Time
1st place, gold medalist(s)	Borriboonwasin Kasemsit; Phaophat Piyaphan; Sommit Anusorn; Waenphrom Nathaworn	Thailand (THA)	3:04.781
2nd place, silver medalist(s)	Hidayat Asep; Riyondra Maizir; Sutrisno Sutrisno; Suyatno Dedi Kurniawan	Indonesia (INA)	3:04.953
3rd place, bronze medalist(s)	Ko Myint Ko; Latt Zaw Wai; Sha Saw Kay; Tun Yazar	Myanmar (MYA)	3:07.415
4	Chong Jonathan; Low Benjamin; Tay Zi Qiang; Yap Keat Howe Luke	Singapore (SIN)	3:12.087
5	Lê Văn Dũng; Nguyễn Tường; Trần Văn Vũ; Trương Văn Hoài	Vietnam (VIE)	3:19.509
6	Ibrahim Mohd Azlan; Mohamed Jamalludin; Ramli Mohd Sukri; Satta Imam Sujadi	Malaysia (MAS)	3:35.208
