= Fencing at the 2015 SEA Games – Women's sabre =

Fencing – Women's sabre at the 2015 SEA Games
- Venue: OCBC Arena Hall 2
- Date: 4 June 2015
- Competitors: 10 from 5 nations

Medalists
gold medal	Lệ Dung	Vietnam
silver medal	Starrat	Thailand
bronze medal	Lau Ywen	Singapore
bronze medal	Pornsawan	Thailand

The women's sabre competition of the fencing event at the 2015 SEA Games was held on 4 June 2015 at the OCBC Arena Hall 2 in Singapore.

== Schedule ==
Date	Time	Round
Wednesday, 4 June 2015	12:00	Round of Pools
Wednesday, 4 June 2015	16:20	Quarterfinals
Wednesday, 4 June 2015	18:20	Semifinals
Wednesday, 4 June 2015	19:40	Final

== Results ==
=== Pool round ===
Source: Round of pools - Women's Individual Sabre

Rank	Athlete	W	L	W/M	TD	TF
1	Lau Ywen (SIN)	4	0	1.000	+9	20
2	Nguyễn Thị Lệ Dung (VIE)	4	0	1.000	+7	20
3	Pornsawan (THA)	3	1	0.750	+5	19
4	Starrat (THA)	2	2	0.500	0	15
5	Nguyễn Thị Thanh Loan (VIE)	2	2	0.500	–1	16
6	Nicanor Jylyn (PHI)	2	2	0.500	–2	15
7	Lee Huimin Ann (SIN)	1	3	0.250	–2	15
8	Anggraini Reni (INA)	1	3	0.250	–3	16
9	Permatasari Diah (INA)	1	3	0.250	–3	14
10	Del Rosario Clichelleyn (PHI)	0	4	0.000	–10	10

=== Knockout round ===
Source: Event Summary

Quarterfinal; 4 June 16:20
Lau Ywen (SIN)	15
Anggraini (INA)	8
Thanh Loan (VIE)	12
Starrat (THA)	15
Pornsawan (THA)	15
Jylyn (PHI)	11
Huimin Ann (SIN)	8
Lệ Dung (VIE)	15

Semifinal; 4 June 18:20
Lau Ywen (SIN)	13
Starrat (THA)	15
Pornsawan (THA)	9
Lệ Dung (VIE)	15

Gold medal match 4 June 19:40
Starrat (THA)	5
Lệ Dung (VIE)	15

== Final standing ==
Source: Final Standing

Rank	Athlete
1st place, gold medalist(s)	Nguyễn Thị Lệ Dung (VIE)
2nd place, silver medalist(s)	Starrat (THA)
3rd place, bronze medalist(s)	Lau Ywen (SIN)
3rd place, bronze medalist(s)	Pornsawan (THA)
5	Nguyễn Thị Thanh Loan (VIE)
6	Nicanor Jylyn (PHI)
7	Lee Huimin Ann (SIN)
8	Anggraini Reni (INA)
9	Permatasari Diah (INA)
10	Del Rosario Clichelleyn (PHI)
