= Canoeing at the 2015 SEA Games – Women's K-1 500 metres =

The Women's K-1 500 metres event at the 2015 SEA Games took place on 8 June 2015 in Singapore's Marina Channel.

Six competitors participated in this event, each representing either Malaysia, Singapore, Vietnam, Thailand, Indonesia, or Myanmar.

== Schedule ==
All times are Singapore Standard Time (UTC+08:00)

Date	Time	Event
Monday, 8 June 2015	09:00	Final

== Start list ==
Lane	Athlete
2	OLLEH Norfatinah (MAS)
3	YAMPRASERT Porncharus (THA)
4	TUN Myo Thandar (MYA)
5	SOKOY Erni (INA)
6	CHEN Jiexian Stephenie (SIN)
7	VU Thi Linh (VIE)

== Results ==
=== Final ===
Rank	Lane	Athlete	Time
1st place, gold medalist(s)	6	CHEN Jiexian Stephenie (SIN)	1:55.531
2nd place, silver medalist(s)	5	SOKOY Erni (INA)	1:59.986
3rd place, bronze medalist(s)	7	VU Thi Linh (VIE)	2:03.644
4	3	YAMPRASERT Porncharus (THA)	2:04.431
5	4	TUN Myo Thandar (MYA)	2:07.344
6	2	OLLEH Norfatinah (MAS)	2:19.904
