= Canoeing at the 2015 SEA Games – Men's C-2 200 metres =

The Men's C-2 200 metres event at the 2015 SEA Games took place on 9 June 2015 at Marina Channel.

== Schedule ==
All times are Singapore Standard Time (UTC+08:00)

Date	Time	Event
Tuesday, 9 June 2015	10:00	Final

== Start list ==
Lane	Nation	Athletes
3	Thailand (THA)	PORANANON Yutthana; CHARUMKHRUEA Arthit
4	Indonesia (INA)	YUNUS Muhammad; TARRA Anwar
5	Myanmar (MYA)	MAUNG Maung; HTIKE Win
6	Philippines (PHI)	FUENTES Ojay; MACARANAS Hermie
7	Singapore (SIN)	CHONG Koi Kiat; TAN Chin Chuen

== Results ==
Rank	Lane	Nation	Athletes	Time
