= Canoeing at the 2015 SEA Games – Men's K-2 1000 metres =

Canoeing – Men's K-2 1000 metres at the 2015 SEA Games
- Venue: Marina Channel
- Date: 6 June 2015
- Competitors: 12 from 6 nations

Medalists
gold medal	Lee Wei Liang Bill; Ooi Brandon Wei Cheng	Singapore
silver medal	Chakkhian Chanrit; Maneejak Chatkamon	Thailand
bronze medal	Nugraha Chandra Destia; Sugiarto Andri	Indonesia

The men's K-2 1000 metres competition of the canoeing event at the 2015 SEA Games was held on 6 June 2015 at the Marina Channel in Singapore.

== Schedule ==
All times are Singapore Standard Time (UTC+08:00)

Date	Time	Event
Saturday, 6 June 2015	10:00	Final

== Results ==
Source: Results - Men's K2-1000m Final

Rank	Rowers	Country	Time
1st place, gold medalist(s)	Lee Wei Liang Bill; Ooi Brandon Wei Cheng	Singapore (SIN)	3:26.002
2nd place, silver medalist(s)	Chakkhian Chanrit; Maneejak Chatkamon	Thailand (THA)	3:28.645
3rd place, bronze medalist(s)	Nugraha Chandra Destia; Sugiarto Andri	Indonesia (INA)	3:30.091
4	Nguyễn Tường; Trần Văn Vũ	Vietnam (VIE)	3:38.759
5	Thu Win Soe; Win Kyaw Soe	Myanmar (MYA)	3:39.611
6	Aris Adam; Salleh Mohd Khairulniza	Malaysia (MAS)	3:47.890
