= Swimming at the 2015 SEA Games – Women's 800 metre freestyle =

Sporting event

Swimming – Women's 800 metre freestyle at the 2015 SEA Games
- Venue: OCBC Aquatic Centre, Singapore Sports Hub
- Dates: 6 June 2015
- Competitors: 10 from 6 nations

Medalists
gold medal	Nguyễn Thị Ánh Viên	Vietnam
silver medal	Ammiga Himathongkom	Thailand
bronze medal	Benjaporn Sriphanomthorn	Thailand

The women's 800 metre freestyle competition of the swimming event at the 2015 SEA Games was held on 6 June at the OCBC Aquatic Centre in the Singapore Sports Hub in Kallang, Singapore.

== Schedule ==
Date	Time	Event
Saturday, 6 June 2015	09:05	Final 1
Saturday, 6 June 2015	19:05	Final 2

== Records ==
Prior to this competition, the existing world, Asian, and Southeast Asian Games records were as follows.

World Record				
Asian Record	Xin Xin (CHN)	8:19.43	Shenyang, China	10 September 2013
Games Record	Lim Lynette Shu-En (SIN)	8:35.41	Vientiane, Laos	12 December 2009

The following records were established during the competition:

Date	Event	Name	Nationality	Time	Record
6 June 2015	Women's 800 metre freestyle	Nguyễn Thị Ánh Viên	Vietnam	8:34.85	GR

== Results ==
=== Final 1 ===
Rank	Lane	Athlete	Time	Notes
1	5	Wang Wenyi Chloe (SIN)	9:11.32	
2	4	Rosalee Mira Santa Ana (PHI)	9:21.81	
3	3	Sagita Putri Krisdewanti (INA)	9:29:21	

=== Final 2 ===
Rank	Lane	Athlete	Time	Notes
1	4	Nguyễn Thị Ánh Viên (VIE)	8:34.85	GR
2	2	Ammiga Himathongkom (THA)	8:52.99	
3	7	Benjaporn Sriphanomthorn (THA)	8:56.39	
4	3	Tseng Wei Wen Rachel (SIN)	8:58.29	
5	8	Lê Thị Mỹ Thảo (VIE)	9:12.54	
6	6	Raina Saumi Graha Ramadhani (INA)	9:23.39	
7	1	Angela Chieng Chui Fei (MAS)	9:29.49	

=== Overall Final Ranking ===
Rank	Athlete	Time	Notes
1st place, gold medalist(s)	Nguyễn Thị Ánh Viên (VIE)	8:34.85	GR
2nd place, silver medalist(s)	Ammiga Himathongkom (THA)	8:52.99	
3rd place, bronze medalist(s)	Benjaporn Sriphanomthorn (THA)	8:56.39	
4	Tseng Wei Wen Rachel (SIN)	8:58.29	
5	Wang Wenyi Chloe (SIN)	9:11.32	
6	Lê Thị Mỹ Thảo (VIE)	9:12.54	
7	Rosalee Mira Santa Ana (PHI)	9:21.81	
8	Raina Saumi Graha Ramadhani (INA)	9:23.39	
9	Sagita Putri Krisdewanti (INA)	9:29:21	
10	Angela Chieng Chui Fei (MAS)	9:29.49	
