= Canoeing at the 2015 SEA Games – Men's C-1 200 metres =

The men's C-1 200 metres event at the 2015 SEA Games took place on 9 June 2015 at Marina Channel.

There will be 7 competitors representing 7 countries set to take part in this event.

== Schedule ==
All times are Singapore Standard Time (UTC+08:00)

Date	Time	Event
Tuesday, 9 June 2015	09:10	Final

== Start list ==
Lane	Athlete
2	TRAN Xuan Dat (VIE)
3	TAN Chin Chuen (SIN)
4	MEHUE Spens Stuber (INA)
5	MAUNG Maung (MYA)
6	MACARANAS Hermie (PHI)
7	CHAITHONG Piyawat (THA)
8	HORL Lyda (CAM)

== Results ==
=== Final ===
Rank	Lane	Athlete	Time
