= Swimming at the 2015 SEA Games – Women's 4 × 100 metre freestyle relay =

Swimming – Women's 4 × 100 metre freestyle relay at the 2015 SEA Games
- Venue: OCBC Aquatic Centre
- Date: 6 June 2015
- Competitors: 16 from 4 nations

Medalists
gold medal	Singapore (SIN)
silver medal	Thailand (THA)
bronze medal	Indonesia (INA)

The women's 4 × 100 metre freestyle relay competition of the swimming events at the 2015 SEA Games was held on 6 June at the OCBC Aquatic Centre in Singapore.

== Schedule ==
All times are Singapore Standard Time (UTC+08:00)

Date	Time	Event
Saturday, 6 June 2015	20:38	Final

== Records ==
Prior to this competition, the existing Asian and Games records were as follows:

Asian Record	China (CHN)	3:35.63	Rome, Italy	26 July 2009
Games Record	Singapore (SIN)	3:45.73	Vientiane, Laos	11 December 2009

== Results ==
KEY:	GR	Games record	NR	National record	PB	Personal best	SB	Seasonal best

=== Final ===
Source: Final Results

The final was held on 6 June.

Rank	Lane	Team	Time	Notes
1st place, gold medalist(s)	4	Singapore (SIN): Nur Marina Chan Alif Abdullah (58.07); Lim Xiang Qi (56.13); Hoong En Qi (56.41); Quah Ting Wen (55.99)	3:46.60	
2nd place, silver medalist(s)	5	Thailand (THA): Jenjira Srisa-ard (58.25); Kornkarnjana Sapianchai (56.92); Benjaporn Sriphanomthorn (57.97); Natthanan Junkrajang (56.48)	3:49.62	
3rd place, bronze medalist(s)	6	Indonesia (INA): Patricia Yosita Hapsari (57.99); Kathriana Mella Gustianji (58.79); Sagita Putri Krisdewanti (58.01); Ressa Kania Dewi (58.39)	3:53.18	
4	3	Philippines (PHI): Hannah Dato (58.51); Roxanne Ashley Yu (59.76); Elizabeth Ann Jordana (59.30); Jasmine Alkhaldi (56.00)	3:53.57	
