= Swimming at the 2015 SEA Games – Women's 200 metre breaststroke =

Swimming – Women's 200 metre breaststroke at the 2015 SEA Games
- Venue: OCBC Aquatic Centre
- Date: 11 June 2015
- Competitors: 10 from 6 nations

Medalists
gold medal	Nguyễn Thị Ánh Viên	Vietnam
silver medal	Phiangkhwan Pawapotako	Thailand
bronze medal	Samantha Louisa Ginn Yeo	Singapore

The women's 200 metre breaststroke competition of the swimming event at the 2015 SEA Games was held on 11 June at the OCBC Aquatic Centre in Kallang, Singapore.

== Records ==
Prior to this competition, the existing Asian and Games records were as follows:

Asian Record	Satomi Suzuki (JPN)	2:20.72	London, Great Britain	2 August 2012
Games Record	Siow Yi Ting (MAS)	2:30.35	Vientiane, Laos	13 December 2009

== Schedule ==
All times are Singapore Standard Time (UTC+08:00)

Date	Time	Event
Monday, 11 June 2015	09:06	Heat 1
Monday, 11 June 2015	09:09	Heat 2
Monday, 11 June 2015	19:42	Final

== Results ==
KEY:	Q	Qualified	GR	Games record	NR	National record	PB	Personal best	SB	Seasonal best	WD	Withdrew	DNF	Did not finish

=== Heats ===
Source: Heats Results Summary

The heats were held on 11 June.

==== Heat 1 ====
Source: Heat 1 Results

Heat 1 was held on 11 June.

Rank	Lane	Athletes	Time	Notes
1	4	Phiangkhwan Pawapotako (THA)	2:36.58	Q
2	5	Nguyễn Thị Ánh Viên (VIE)	2:37.26	Q
3	6	Chavunnooch Salubluek (THA)	2:38.86	Q
4	2	Ananda Treciel V. Evato (INA)	2:41.13	Q
5	3	Christie May Chue Mun Ee (SIN)	2:41.86	

==== Heat 2 ====
Source: Heat 2 Results

Heat 2 was held on 11 June.

Rank	Lane	Athletes	Time	Notes
1	5	Samantha Louisa Ginn Yeo (SIN)	2:37.18	Q
2	6	Raissa Regatta Gavino (PHI)	2:40.18	Q
3	3	Erika Kong Chia Chia (MAS)	2:40.69	Q
4	4	Christina Loh Yen Ling (MAS)	2:40.80	Q
5	2	Imelda Corazon Wistey (PHI)	2:46.42	

=== Final ===
Source: Final Results

The final was held on 11 June.

Rank	Lane	Athletes	Time	Notes
1st place, gold medalist(s)	3	Nguyễn Thị Ánh Viên (VIE)	2:31.16	
2nd place, silver medalist(s)	4	Phiangkhwan Pawapotako (THA)	2:31.51	
3rd place, bronze medalist(s)	5	Samantha Louisa Ginn Yeo (SIN)	2:35.60	
4	1	Christina Loh Yen Ling (MAS)	2:36.57	
5	6	Chavunnooch Salubluek (THA)	2:37.71	
6	8	Ananda Treciel V. Evato (INA)	2:40.34	
7	7	Erika Kong Chia Chia (MAS)	2:40.44	
8	2	Raissa Regatta Gavino (PHI)	2:43.12	
