= Squash at the 2015 SEA Games – Women's team =

Squash – Women's team at the 2015 SEA Games
- Venue: Kallang Squash Centre
- Dates: 11-13 June 2015
- Competitors: 17 from 5 nations

Medalists
gold medal	Malaysia (MAS)
silver medal	Indonesia (INA)
bronze medal	Singapore (SIN)
bronze medal	Thailand (THA)

The women's team competition of the squash event at the 2015 Southeast Asian Games was held from June 11–13, 2015 at the Kallang Squash Centre, Kallang, Singapore. The Gold Medal was won by Malaysia.

== Schedule ==
Date	Time	Round
Thursday, 11 June 2015	10:00	Preliminaries
Thursday, 11 June 2015	17:00	Preliminaries
Friday, 12 June 2015	10:00	Preliminaries
Friday, 12 June 2015	17:00	Semifinals
Saturday, 13 June 2015	13:00	Finals

== Results ==
Source: Results Summary

=== Preliminary round ===
==== Pool A ====
Player	Pld	W	L	GF	GA	PF	PA	Points
Malaysia (MAS)	2	2	0	18	0	198	53	2
Thailand (THA)	2	1	1	9	10	138	149	1
Myanmar (MYA)	2	0	2	1	18	72	206	0

11 June; 12:00	Malaysia (MAS)	3–0	Thailand (THA)	Kallang Squash Centre Court 1

11 June; 17:00	Thailand (THA)	3–0	Myanmar (MYA)	Kallang Squash Centre Court 7

12 June; 10:00	Malaysia (MAS)	3–0	Myanmar (MYA)	Kallang Squash Centre Court 1

==== Pool B ====
Player	Pld	W	L	GF	GA	PF	PA	Points
Indonesia (INA)	2	1	0	9	5	130	130	1
Singapore (SIN)	2	0	1	5	9	130	130	0

11 June; 12:00	Indonesia (INA)	3–0	Singapore (SIN)	Kallang Squash Centre Court 7

=== Knockout round ===
Semifinals; 12 June 17:00
Singapore (SIN)	0
Malaysia (MAS)	2
Thailand (THA)	0
Indonesia (INA)	2

Gold medal match 13 June 13:00
Malaysia (MAS)	2
Indonesia (INA)	0

==== Semifinals ====
12 June; 17:00	Report	Singapore (SIN)	0–2	Malaysia (MAS)	Kallang Squash Centre Court 1

12 June; 17:00	Report	Thailand (THA)	0–2	Indonesia (INA)	Kallang Squash Centre Court 7

==== Gold medal match ====
13 June; 13:00	Report	Malaysia (MAS)	2–0	Indonesia (INA)	Kallang Squash Centre Court 1
