= Canoeing at the 2015 SEA Games – Women's K-1 200 metres =

The Women's K-1 200 metres event at the 2015 SEA Games took place on 9 June 2015 at Marina Channel.

Six competitors representing six countries took part in this event.

== Schedule ==
All times are Singapore Standard Time (UTC+08:00)

Date	Time	Event
Tuesday, 9 June 2015	09:20	Final

== Start list ==
Lane	Athlete
2	OLLEH Norfatinah (MAS)
3	DO Thi Thanh Thao (VIE)
4	TUN Myo Thandar (MYA)
5	CHEN Sarah Jiemei (SIN)
6	SOKOY Erni (INA)
7	CHOCNGAMWONG Varipan (THA)
