= Athletics at the 2015 SEA Games – Men's marathon =

Athletics – Men's marathon at the 2015 SEA Games
- Venue: Kallang Practice Track
- Date: 7 June 2015
- Competitors: 12 from 7 nations

Medalists
gold medal	Soh Rui Yong	Singapore
silver medal	Boonthung Srisung	Thailand
bronze medal	Hoàng Nguyên Thanh	Vietnam

The men's marathon competition of the athletics event at the 2015 SEA Games was held on 7 June at the Kallang Practice Track in Singapore.

== Records ==
Prior to this competition, the existing Asian and Games records were as follows:

Asian record	Toshinari Takaoka (JPN)	2:06:16	Chicago, United States	13 October 2002
Games record	Eduardus Nabunome (INA)	2:20:27	Jakarta, Indonesia	19 October 1997

== Schedule ==
All times are Singapore Standard Time (UTC+08:00)

Date	Time	Event
Saturday, 7 June 2015	06:00	Final

== Results ==
KEY:	GR	Games record	NR	National record	PB	Personal best	SB	Seasonal best	DNF	Did not finish

Source: Final Results

Rank	Athletes	Time	Notes
1st place, gold medalist(s)	Soh Rui Yong Guillaume (SIN)	2:34:56	
2nd place, silver medalist(s)	Boonthung Srisung (THA)	2:35:09	
3rd place, bronze medalist(s)	Hoàng Nguyên Thanh (VIE)	2:37:10	
4	Hamdan Syafril Sayuti (INA)	2:38:50	
5	Eduardo Buenavista (PHI)	2:39:26	
6	Kuniaki Takizaki (CAM)	2:42:39	
7	Thu Soe Min (MYA)	2:43:26	
8	Ashley Liew Wei Yen (SIN)	2:44:02	
9	Ma Viro (CAM)	2:55:49	
10	Bùi Thế Anh (VIE)	2:59:39	
	Aye Thaung (MYA)	—	DNF
	Rafael Poliquit Jr. (PHI)	—	DNF
