= Canoeing at the 2015 SEA Games – Women's C-1 200 metres =

The Women's C-1 200 metres event at the 2015 SEA Games took place on 9 June 2015 at Marina Channel.

There were 5 competitors representing 5 countries that took part in this event.

== Schedule ==
All times are Singapore Standard Time (UTC+08:00)

Date	Time	Event
Tuesday, 9 June 2015	09:40	Final

== Start list ==
Lane	Athlete
3	CHIA Christine (SIN)
4	WIN Naw Cherry (MYA)
5	TRUONG Thi Phuong (VIE)
6	THIANGKATHOK Orasa (THA)
7	ANDRIYANI Riska (INA)
