= Canoeing at the 2015 SEA Games – Women's K-4 500 metres =

The Women's K-4 500 metres event at the 2015 SEA Games took place on 8 June 2015 at Marina Channel.

There are six teams took part in the event.

== Schedule ==
All times are Singapore Standard Time (UTC+08:00)

Date	Time	Event
Monday, 8 June 2015	09:30	Final

== Start list ==
Lane	Nation	Athletes
2	Indonesia (INA)	MASRIPAH Masripah; RAMADANI Riska Elpia; AIDAH Aidah; KADOP Yunita
3	Malaysia (MAS)	IBRAHIM Noor Azira; IBRAHIM Nor Azita; IBRAHIM Nusaibah Syahida; WAHAB Fatin Ajeerah
4	Vietnam (VIE)	NGUYEN Thi Hai Yen; DO Thi Thanh Thao; MA Thi Tuyet; DUONG Thi Bich Loan
5	Singapore (SIN)	LEE Wei Ling Geraldine; SOH Sze Ying; NG Annabelle Xiang Ru; CHEN Sarah Jiemei
6	Myanmar (MYA)	HTAY Htay; WIN Su Myat; LWIN Cho Mar; AYE Naw Htwe Htwe
7	Thailand (THA)	SRIPADUNG Chayanin; YAMPRASERT Porncharus; AOENTHACHAI Thanyaluk; CHOCNGAMWONG Varipan

== Results ==
Rank	Lane	Nation	Athletes	Time
