= Athletics at the 2015 SEA Games – Men's hammer throw =

The men's hammer throw at the 2015 SEA Games was held at National Stadium, Singapore. The track and field events took place on June 9.

== Schedule ==
All times are (UTC+08:00)

Date	Time	Event
Tuesday, 9 June 2015	09:30	Final

== Records ==
Prior to this competition, the existing world, Asian, and Southeast Asian Games records were as follows.

World Record	Yuriy Sedykh (URS)	86.74	Stuttgart, West Germany	30 August 1986
Asian Record	Koji Murofushi (JPN)	84.86	Prague, Czech Republic	29 June 2003
Games Record	Tantipong Phetchaiya (THA)	62.23	Naypyidaw, Myanmar	15 December 2013

The following new record were set during this competition.

Date	Event	Athlete	Time	Records
9 June	Final	Caleb John Stuart (PHI)	65.63 m	GR

== Results ==
Legend

- X — Failure
- SB — Seasonal Best
- PB — Personal Best
- GR — Games Record

Rank	Athlete	Attempts						Result	Notes
Rank	Athlete	1	2	3	4	5	6	Result	Notes
1st place, gold medalist(s)	Caleb John Stuart (PHI)	X	57.75	65.63	64.06	X	64.46	65.63	GR
2nd place, silver medalist(s)	Tantipong Phetchaiya (THA)	60.25	59.56	61.58	59.91	60.95	62.12	62.12	SB
3rd place, bronze medalist(s)	Jackie Wong Siew Cheer (MAS)	58.85	X	X	X	X	61.18	61.18	
4	Arniel Ferreira (PHI)	58.03	57.16	57.90	58.31	59.72	60.08	60.08	SB
5	Kittipong Boonmawan (THA)	58.30	56.96	X	X	58.00	57.81	58.30	PB
6	Ye Htet Aung (MYA)	X	46.50	50.31	50.12	X	X	50.31	PB
