= Swimming at the 2015 SEA Games – Women's 4 × 100 metre medley relay =

Swimming event in Southeast Asian games

Swimming – Women's 4 × 100 metre medley relay at the 2015 SEA Games
- Venue: OCBC Aquatic Centre
- Date: 10 June 2015
- Competitors: 20 from 5 nations

Medalists
gold medal	Singapore (SIN)
silver medal	Thailand (THA)
bronze medal	Philippines (PHI)

The women's 4 × 100 metre medley relay competition of the swimming events at the 2015 SEA Games was held on 10 June at the OCBC Aquatic Centre in Singapore.

== Schedule ==
All times are Singapore Standard Time (UTC+08:00)

Date	Time	Event
Wednesday, 10 June 2015	20:42	Final

== Records ==
Prior to this competition, the existing Asian and Games records were as follows:

Asian Record	China (CHN)	3:52.19	Rome, Italy	1 August 2009
Games Record	Singapore (SIN)	4:10.38	Vientiane, Laos	13 December 2009

The following records were established during the competition:

Date	Event	Team	Time	Record
10 June	Final	Singapore (SIN)	4:08.72	GR

== Results ==
KEY:	GR	Games record	NR	National record	PB	Personal best	SB	Seasonal best	DSQ	Disqualified

=== Final ===
Source: Final Results

The final was held on 10 June.

Rank	Lane	Team	Time	Notes
1st place, gold medalist(s)	5	Singapore (SIN): Tao Li (1:03.56); Ho Ru'En Roanne (1:09.66); Quah Ting Wen (59.18); Lim Xiang Qi (56.32)	4:08.72	GR
2nd place, silver medalist(s)	4	Thailand (THA): Araya Wongvat (1:04.61); Phiangkhwan Pawapotako (1:11.70); Patarawadee Kittiya (1:01.32); Natthanan Junkrajang (55.17)	4:12.80	NR
3rd place, bronze medalist(s)	3	Philippines (PHI): Roxanne Ashley Yu (1:05.32); Imelda Corazon Wistey (1:14.36); Hannah Dato (1:01.28); Jasmine Alkhaldi (55.23)	4:16.19	
	5	Indonesia (INA): Anak Agung Istri Kania Ratih; Anandia Treciel V. Evato; Monalisa Arieswaty Lorenza; Patricia Yosita Hapsari	—	DSQ
	2	Malaysia (MAS): Caroline Chan Zi Xin; Phee Jinq En; Yap Siew Hui; Chui Lai Kwan	—	DSQ
