= Athletics at the 2015 SEA Games – Women's hammer throw =

The women's hammer throw at the 2015 SEA Games was held at National Stadium, Singapore. The track and field events took place on June 9.

== Schedule ==
All times are (UTC+08:00)

Date	Time	Event
Tuesday, 9 June 2015	06:45	Final

== Records ==
Prior to this competition, the existing world, Asian, and Southeast Asian Games records were as follows.

World Record	Anita Włodarczyk (POL)	79.58	Berlin, Germany	31 August 2014
Asian Record	Wang Zheng (CHN)	77.68	Chengdu, China	29 March 2014
Games Record	Tan Song Hwa (MAS)	56.41	Vientiane, Laos	15 December 2009

The following new record were set during this competition.

Date	Event	Athlete	Time	Records
9 June	Final	Mingkamon Koomphon (THA)	56.57 m	GR

== Results ==
Legend

- X — Failure
- SB — Seasonal Best
- PB — Personal Best
- GR — Games Record

Rank	Athlete	Attempts						Result	Notes
Rank	Athlete	1	2	3	4	5	6	Result	Notes
1st place, gold medalist(s)	Mingkamon Koomphon (THA)	X	51.86	54.57	54.44	56.57	54.37	56.57	GR
2nd place, silver medalist(s)	Panwat Gimsrang (THA)	X	52.23	55.29	55.11	55.47	55.18	55.47	PB
3rd place, bronze medalist(s)	Grace Wong Xiu Mei (MAS)	53.80	43.19	51.26	52.54	53.26	49.75	53.80	
4	Casier Renee Kelly Lee (MAS)	X	50.78	50.18	X	X	48.62	50.78	
5	M Soe Zar (MYA)	43.99	41.26	X	X	39.09	41.72	43.99	
6	Phonexai Paosavad (LAO)	X	X	X	X	X	31.26	31.26	
