= Sepak takraw at the 2015 SEA Games =

Singapore 2015 Asian games

- Venue: Expo Hall 1
- Dates: 6 June 2015 to 15 June 2015
- Competitors: 173 from 10 nations

Sepak takraw at the 2015 SEA Games was held at EXPO Hall 1, Singapore from 6 to 15 June 2015.

Chinlone, which was previously introduced at the 2013 SEA Games in Myanmar, was subsumed under the sport of sepak takraw at the 2015 SEA Games. Only 4 Chinlone events competed by men were held.

== Participating nations ==
A total of 173 athletes from 10 nations will be competing in sepak takraw at the 2015 Southeast Asian Games:

- Brunei (8)
- Cambodia (16)
- Indonesia (19)
- Laos (18)
- Malaysia (23)
- Myanmar (25)
- Philippines (8)
- Singapore (17)
- Thailand (31)
- Vietnam (8)

== Competition schedule ==
The following is the competition schedule for the sepak takraw competitions:

P	Preliminaries	½	Semifinals	F	Final

Sepaktakraw
Event↓/Date →	Mon 8	Tue 9	Wed 10	Thu 11	Fri 12	Sat 13			Sun 14	Mon 15	
Men's regu					P	P	½	F			
Women's regu					P	P	½	F			
Men's doubles									P	½	F
Women's doubles									P	½	F
Men's team	P	P									
Men's team doubles			P	P	P						

Chinlone
Event↓/Date →	Sat 6		Sun 7	
Men's non-repetition primary			P	F
Men's same stroke			P	F
Men's linking	P	F		
Men's non-repetition secondary	P	F		

== Medalists ==
=== Men's ===
Event	Gold	Silver	Bronze
Regu	Malaysia (MAS); Farhan Adam; Mohd Hanafiah Dolah; Mohd K. Zaman Hamir Akhbar; Ahmad Aizat Mohd Nor Azmi; Mohammad Syahir Mohd Rosdi	Singapore (SIN); Mohamad Farhan Amran; Muhammad Asri Aron; Muhammad Hafiz Ja'afar; Muhammad A'fif Safiee; Muhammad Yassin Suhaimi	Laos (LAO); Kantana Nanthisen; Souktula Phouthavong; Lamphoun Sengsouvanh; Senganh Sengvanh; Noum Souvannalith
Regu	Malaysia (MAS); Farhan Adam; Mohd Hanafiah Dolah; Mohd K. Zaman Hamir Akhbar; Ahmad Aizat Mohd Nor Azmi; Mohammad Syahir Mohd Rosdi	Singapore (SIN); Mohamad Farhan Amran; Muhammad Asri Aron; Muhammad Hafiz Ja'afar; Muhammad A'fif Safiee; Muhammad Yassin Suhaimi	Philippines (PHI); John John Bobier; Rhemwll Catana; Ronsited Gabayeron; John Jeffrey Morcillos; Regle Reznan Pabriga
Team	Thailand (THA); Anuwat Chaichana; Siriwat Sakha; Thawisak Thongsai; Pornchai Kaokaew; Panupong Petlue; Yupadee Pattarapong; Thanawat Chumsena; Somporn Jaisinghol; Assadin Wongyota; Sittipong Khamchan; Kritsanapong Nontakote; Sahachat Sakhoncharoen	Malaysia (MAS); Ahmad Aizat Mohd Nor Azmi; Mohd Safarudin Abu Bakar; Mohamad Azlan Alias; Mohd K. Zaman Hamir Akhbar; Mohd Zamree Mohd Dahan; M. Nazmi Mohd Najib; Mohd Hanafiah Dolah; Farhan Adam; Muhammad Hairul Hazizi Haidzir; Zuleffendi Sumari; Mohammad Syahir Mohd Rosdi; Muhammad Zaim Razali	Indonesia (INA); Saiful Rizal; Muhammad Herson Saiful; Dedi Setyawan; Hendra Pago; Darmawan; Victoria Eka Prasetyo; Muhammad Ruswan Wajib; Nofrisal; Andi Try Sandi; Risky Abdul Rahman Pago; Syamsul Akmal; Syafiudin
Team	Thailand (THA); Anuwat Chaichana; Siriwat Sakha; Thawisak Thongsai; Pornchai Kaokaew; Panupong Petlue; Yupadee Pattarapong; Thanawat Chumsena; Somporn Jaisinghol; Assadin Wongyota; Sittipong Khamchan; Kritsanapong Nontakote; Sahachat Sakhoncharoen	Malaysia (MAS); Ahmad Aizat Mohd Nor Azmi; Mohd Safarudin Abu Bakar; Mohamad Azlan Alias; Mohd K. Zaman Hamir Akhbar; Mohd Zamree Mohd Dahan; M. Nazmi Mohd Najib; Mohd Hanafiah Dolah; Farhan Adam; Muhammad Hairul Hazizi Haidzir; Zuleffendi Sumari; Mohammad Syahir Mohd Rosdi; Muhammad Zaim Razali	Singapore (SIN); Mohtar Umar Mohammad; Muhammad Danial Feriza Padzli; Mohamad Faizal Md Saad; Muhammad Magrib Ibrahim; Muhammad Farhan Aman; Asfandi Bin Ja'al; Muhammad A'fif Safiee; Muhammad Yassin Suhaimi; Muhammad Asri Aron; Muhammad Hafiz Ja'afar; Mohamad Farhan Amran; Muhammad Iqmal Khasbullah
Doubles	Myanmar (MYA); Zaw Zaw Aung; Zaw Latt; Aung Myo Swe	Philippines (PHI); Emmanuel Escote; Jason Huerte; Rheyjey Ortouste	Laos (LAO); Kantana Nanthisen; Lamphoun Sengsouvanh; Noum Souvannalith
Doubles	Myanmar (MYA); Zaw Zaw Aung; Zaw Latt; Aung Myo Swe	Philippines (PHI); Emmanuel Escote; Jason Huerte; Rheyjey Ortouste	Singapore (SIN); Mohamad Farhan Amran; Asfandi Bin Ja'al; Muhammad A'fif Safiee
Team doubles	Thailand (THA); Anuwat Chaichana; Suwicha Tala; Pornchai Kaokaew; Panupong Petlue; Yupadee Pattarapong; Assadin Wongyota; Seksan Tubtong; Pornthep Wapisiri; Sahachat Sakhoncharoen	Myanmar (MYA); Aung Ko Oo; Zaw Zaw Aung; Thant Zin Oo; Aung Myo Swe; Zaw Latt; Myo Myint Zaw; Wai Lin Aung; Aung Pyah Tun; Kyaw Soe Win	Indonesia (INA); Saiful Rizal; Herson Saiful Muhammad; Hendra Pago; Victoria Eka Prasetyo; Muhammad Ruswan Wajib; Nofrisal; Risky Abdul Rahman Pago; Syamsul Akmal; Syafiuddin
Team doubles	Thailand (THA); Anuwat Chaichana; Suwicha Tala; Pornchai Kaokaew; Panupong Petlue; Yupadee Pattarapong; Assadin Wongyota; Seksan Tubtong; Pornthep Wapisiri; Sahachat Sakhoncharoen	Myanmar (MYA); Aung Ko Oo; Zaw Zaw Aung; Thant Zin Oo; Aung Myo Swe; Zaw Latt; Myo Myint Zaw; Wai Lin Aung; Aung Pyah Tun; Kyaw Soe Win	Singapore (SIN); Mohamad Faizal Md Saad; Muhammad Magrib Ibrahim; Muhammad Farhan Aman; Asfandi Bin Ja'al; Muhammad A'fif Safiee; Muhammad Yassin Suhaimi; Muhammad Asri Aron; Muhammad Hafiz Ja'afar; Mohamad Farhan Amran
Non-Repetition Primary	Thailand (THA); Khanawut Rungrot; Witsarut Srisawat; Eekkawee Ruenphara; Thongchai Sombatkerd; Noppadon Kongthawthong; Komin Naonon; Kamol Prasert; Pongphan Obthom	Malaysia (MAS); Mohammad Kamal Azmi; Mohamad Azlan Alias; Mohammad Arif; Mohd Nazuha Mohd Nadzi; Muhammad Zaim Razali; Amirul Zazwan Amir; Ab Muhaimi Che Bongsu; M. Fazil Mohd Asri	Brunei (BRU); Ismail Ang; Mohammad Hafizzudin Jamaludin; Jamaludin Awang Haji Marzi; Nur Alimin Sungoh; Mohammad Sukri Jaineh; Zatie Hidayat Saidi; Humaidi Brahim; Muhammad Basyiruddin Haji Kamis
Non-Repetition Primary	Thailand (THA); Khanawut Rungrot; Witsarut Srisawat; Eekkawee Ruenphara; Thongchai Sombatkerd; Noppadon Kongthawthong; Komin Naonon; Kamol Prasert; Pongphan Obthom	Malaysia (MAS); Mohammad Kamal Azmi; Mohamad Azlan Alias; Mohammad Arif; Mohd Nazuha Mohd Nadzi; Muhammad Zaim Razali; Amirul Zazwan Amir; Ab Muhaimi Che Bongsu; M. Fazil Mohd Asri	Singapore (SIN); Eddy Nor Shafiq Sahari; Mohammad Abdul Kahar; M. Elhazeeq Mohmed Ulhaq; Raihan Alladin; Muhammad Izwandy Zamri; Nor Irsharuddin Ikhsan; Mohamad Faisal Md Saad; Muhammad Iqmal Khasbullah
Same Stroke	Myanmar (MYA); Kyaw Soe Moe; Kyaw Moe Tun; Aung Naing Phyo; Lwin Phyo Win; Aung Myo Myint; Myo Zaw Oo; San Lwin Oo; Myo Min Thu	Thailand (THA); Khanawut Rungrot; Witsarut Srisawat; Eekkawee Ruenphara; Thongchai Sombatkerd; Noppadon Kongthawthong; Komin Naonon; Kamol Prasert; Pongphan Obthom	Brunei (BRU); Ismail Ang; Mohammad Hafizzudin Jamaludin; Jamaludin Awang Haji Marzi; Nur Alimin Sungoh; Mohammad Sukri Jaineh; Zatie Hidayat Saidi; Humaidi Brahim; Muhammad Basyiruddin Haji Kamis
Same Stroke	Myanmar (MYA); Kyaw Soe Moe; Kyaw Moe Tun; Aung Naing Phyo; Lwin Phyo Win; Aung Myo Myint; Myo Zaw Oo; San Lwin Oo; Myo Min Thu	Thailand (THA); Khanawut Rungrot; Witsarut Srisawat; Eekkawee Ruenphara; Thongchai Sombatkerd; Noppadon Kongthawthong; Komin Naonon; Kamol Prasert; Pongphan Obthom	Singapore (SIN); Eddy Nor Shafiq Sahari; Mohammad Abdul Kahar; M. Elhazeeq Mohmed Ulhaq; Raihan Alladin; Muhammad Izwandy Zamri; Nor Irsharuddin Ikhsan; Mohamad Faisal Md Saad; Muhammad Iqmal Khasbullah
Linking	Cambodia (CAM); Ung Narith; Treung Ly; Ream Sokphearom; Cheat Khemrin; Heng Rawut; Chin Sovannarith; Nang Sopheap; Sopheak Johnny	Laos (LAO); Saikham; Viengnakhone Kitnaly; Chanthalak Chanthavong; Vixay Phommavongsa; Yothin Sombatphouthone; Phitthisanh Bounpaseuth; Viriyan Sombatphouthone; Thienphachanh Bounyong	Malaysia (MAS); Mohammad Kamal Azmi; Mohamad Azlan Alias; Mohammad Arif; Mohd Nazuha Mohd Nadzi; Muhammad Zaim Razali; Amirul Zazwan Amir; Ab Muhaimi Che Bongsu; M. Fazil Mohd Asri
Linking	Cambodia (CAM); Ung Narith; Treung Ly; Ream Sokphearom; Cheat Khemrin; Heng Rawut; Chin Sovannarith; Nang Sopheap; Sopheak Johnny	Laos (LAO); Saikham; Viengnakhone Kitnaly; Chanthalak Chanthavong; Vixay Phommavongsa; Yothin Sombatphouthone; Phitthisanh Bounpaseuth; Viriyan Sombatphouthone; Thienphachanh Bounyong	Singapore (SIN); Eddy Nor Shafiq Sahari; Mohammad Abdul Kahar; M. Elhazeeq Mohmed Ulhaq; Raihan Alladin; Muhammad Izwandy Zamri; Nor Irsharuddin Ikhsan; Mohamad Faisal Md Saad; Muhammad Iqmal Khasbullah
Non-Repetition Secondary	Myanmar (MYA); Kyaw Soe Moe; Kyaw Moe Tun; Aung Naing Phyo; Lwin Phyo Win; Aung Myo Myint; Myo Zaw Oo; San Lwin Oo; Myo Min Thu	Laos (LAO); Saikham; Viengnakhone Kitnaly; Chanthalak Chanthavong; Vixay Phommavongsa; Yothin Sombatphouthone; Phitthisanh Bounpaseuth; Viriyan Sombatphouthone; Thienphachanh Bounyong	Cambodia (CAM); Ung Narith; Treung Ly; Ream Sokphearom; Cheat Khemrin; Heng Rawut; Chin Sovannarith; Nang Sopheap; Sopheak Johnny
Non-Repetition Secondary	Myanmar (MYA); Kyaw Soe Moe; Kyaw Moe Tun; Aung Naing Phyo; Lwin Phyo Win; Aung Myo Myint; Myo Zaw Oo; San Lwin Oo; Myo Min Thu	Laos (LAO); Saikham; Viengnakhone Kitnaly; Chanthalak Chanthavong; Vixay Phommavongsa; Yothin Sombatphouthone; Phitthisanh Bounpaseuth; Viriyan Sombatphouthone; Thienphachanh Bounyong	Singapore (SIN); Eddy Nor Shafiq Sahari; Mohammad Abdul Kahar; M. Elhazeeq Mohmed Ulhaq; Raihan Alladin; Muhammad Izwandy Zamri; Nor Irsharuddin Ikhsan; Mohamad Faisal Md Saad; Muhammad Iqmal Khasbullah

=== Women's ===
Event	Gold	Silver	Bronze
Regu	Thailand (THA); Kaewjai Pumsawangkaew; Fueangfa Praphatsarang; Sasiwimol Janthasit; Wanwisa Jankaen; Wiphada Chitphuan	Myanmar (MYA); Zar Ei Thin; Myint Nant Yin Yin; Nyunt Thin Zar Soe; Htut Kay Zin; Htwe Nwe Nwe	Malaysia (MAS); Siti Norzubaidah Che Abdul Wahab; Elly Syahira Rosli; Nurul Izzatul Hikmah Md Zulkifli; Nor Farhana Ismail; Siti Nor Suhaida Jafri
Regu	Thailand (THA); Kaewjai Pumsawangkaew; Fueangfa Praphatsarang; Sasiwimol Janthasit; Wanwisa Jankaen; Wiphada Chitphuan	Myanmar (MYA); Zar Ei Thin; Myint Nant Yin Yin; Nyunt Thin Zar Soe; Htut Kay Zin; Htwe Nwe Nwe	Vietnam (VIE); Le Thi Tham; Duong Thi Xuyen; Bui Thi Hai Yen; Giap Thi Hien; Tran Thi Thu Hoai
Doubles	Thailand (THA); Masaya Duangsri; Somruedee Pruepruk; Payom Srihongsa	Myanmar (MYA); Kyu Kyu Thin; Phyu Phyu Than; Khin Hnin Wai	Laos (LAO); Norkham Vongxay; Koy Xayavong; Nouandam Volabouth
Doubles	Thailand (THA); Masaya Duangsri; Somruedee Pruepruk; Payom Srihongsa	Myanmar (MYA); Kyu Kyu Thin; Phyu Phyu Than; Khin Hnin Wai	Vietnam (VIE); Nguyen Thi Quyen; Tran Thi Viet My; Hoang Thi Hoa

== Results ==
=== Men ===
==== Chinlone-Linking ====
Table-Preliminary Round

Key to colours in group table
Group winner and runner-up advanced to the final

Rank	Team	Score
1	Cambodia (CAM)	318
2	Laos (LAO)	289
3	Malaysia (MAS)	208
3	Singapore (SIN)	112

"Final"

Rank	Team	Score
1	Cambodia (CAM)	308
2	Laos (LAO)	299

Report

== Medal table ==
* Host nation (Singapore)

Rank	Nation	Gold	Silver	Bronze	Total
1	Thailand (THA)	5	1	0	6
2	Myanmar (MYA)	3	3	0	6
3	Malaysia (MAS)	1	2	2	5
4	Cambodia (CAM)	1	0	1	2
5	Laos (LAO)	0	2	3	5
6	Singapore (SIN)*	0	1	7	8
7	Philippines (PHI)	0	1	1	2
8	Brunei (BRU)	0	0	2	2
8	Indonesia (INA)	0	0	2	2
8	Vietnam (VIE)	0	0	2	2
Totals (10 entries)		10	10	20	40
