= Canoeing at the 2015 SEA Games – Men's K-4 200 metres =

The Men's K-4 200 metres event at the 2015 SEA Games took place on 9 June 2015 at Marina Channel.

There were 6 teams set to take part in this event.

== Schedule ==
All times are Singapore Standard Time (UTC+08:00)

Date	Time	Event
Tuesday, 9 June 2015	09:00	Final

== Start list ==
Lane	Nation	Athletes
2	Malaysia (MAS)	ZAINAL Muhammad Izzuddin; ABDUL JABAR Ahmad Shafiee; SATTA Imam Sujadi; HEESHAM Abdul Halim
3	Thailand (THA)	SOMMIT Anusorn; SRICHART Aditep; WAENPHROM Nathaworn; BORRIBOONWASIN Kasemsit
4	Myanmar (MYA)	LATT Zaw Wai; SHA Saw Kay; THU Aung Myo; TUN Yazar
5	Singapore (SIN)	NASIMAN Muhammad Syaheenul Aiman; LEE Wei Liang Bill; LIM Jia Li Jori; OOI Brandon Wei Cheng
6	Vietnam (VIE)	NGUYEN Tuong; TRUONG Van Hoai; TRAN Van Vu; LE Van Dung
7	Indonesia (INA)	RIYONDRA Maizir; SUTRISNO Sutrisno; HIDAYAT Asep; SUGIARTO Andri

== Results ==
Rank	Lane	Nation	Athletes	Time
