= Canoeing at the 2015 SEA Games – Men's K-1 200 metres =

The Men's K-1 200 metres event at the 2015 SEA Games took place on 9 June 2015 at Marina Channel.

Seven competitors representing seven countries took part in this event. It was won by Mervyn Toh Yingjie of Singapore.

== Schedule ==
All times are Singapore Standard Time (UTC+08:00)

Date	Time	Event
Tuesday, 9 June 2015	09:30	Final

== Start list ==
Lane	Athlete
2	MOHAMMAD Hamdan (MAS)
3	GANDIE Gandie (INA)
4	THU Aung Myo (MYA)
5	TOH Mervyn Yingjie (SIN)
6	SRICHART Aditep (THA)
7	AMPOSTA Marvin (PHI)
8	RON Pherou (CAM)

== Results ==
=== Final ===
Event	Gold	Silver	Bronze
K-2 1000	Singapore (SIN); Brandon Ooi Wei Cheng; Lee Wei Liang Bill	Thailand (THA); Chatkamon Maneejak; Chanrit Chakkhian	Indonesia (INA); Andri Sugiarto; Chandra Destia Nugraha
