= Traditional boat race at the 2015 SEA Games =

- Venue: Marina Bay
- Dates: 6 June 2015 to 7 June 2015
- Competitors: 148 from 6 nations

Traditional boat race at the 2015 SEA Games will be held in Marina Bay, Singapore from 6 to 7 June 2015.

== Participating nations ==
A total of 148 athletes from six nations will be competing in traditional boat race at the 2015 Southeast Asian Games:

- Cambodia (14)
- Indonesia (28)
- Myanmar (28)
- Philippines (22)
- Singapore (28)
- Thailand (28)

== Medalists ==
=== Men ===
| Event | Gold | Silver | Bronze |
|---|---|---|---|
| 200 m (6-crew) | Thailand (THA); Laor Iamluek; Tanawoot Waipinid; Thotsaporn Pholseth; Pornchai Tesdee; Vinya Seechomchuen; Pornprom Kramsuk; Boonsong Imtim; Wanchat Thani | Myanmar (MYA); Gay Saw Htoo; Min Zaw; Aye Kyaw Saw; Aung Saw Moe; Lwin Htet Wai; Naing Min; Aung Zaw Moe; Zaw Min Min | Singapore (SIN); Neo Aik Jin Clement; Tan Renyi Jerry; Gan Chea Hau; Kiang Jian Xiang; Hong Oz Titus Mong Zi; Loh Zhi Ying; Tan Jit Lun Shawn; Tan Chun Leng |
| 200 m (12-crew) | Indonesia (INA); Silo; Dedy Irianto Bwefer; Andri Agus Mulyana; Agunawan; Syahrul Sahputra; Arpan; Achmad Fajrurrochman; Sofianto; Muhammad Fajar Faturohman; Jefklin Mehue; Muhammad Syahtiri Ramdhan; Syarifuddin; Azwir Aboni; Rusmin Sina | Thailand (THA); Laor Iamluek; Nattagun Baengtid; Tanawoot Waipinid; Ekkapong Wongunjai; Chaiyakarn Choochuen; Pornchai Tesdee; Vinya Seechomchuen; Sutee Chimchai; Pornprom Kramsuk; Wanchat Thani; Boonsong Imtim; Asdawut Mitilee; Thotsaporn Pholseth; Phawonrat Roddee | Myanmar (MYA); Gay Saw Htoo; Min Zaw; Aye Kyaw Saw; Aung Saw Moe; Lwin Htet Wai; Aung Zaw Moe; Naing Min; Thu Thiha; Hein Sai San; Saw Lawkal; Zaw Min Min; Htet Zaw; AungSai Min; Oo Myo Thet |
| 500 m (6-crew) | Myanmar (MYA); Gay Saw Htoo; Min Zaw; Aye Kyaw Saw; Aung Saw Moe; Lwin Htet Wai; Naing Min; Aung Zaw Moe; Zaw Min Min | Thailand (THA); Thotsaporn Pholseth; Chaiyakarn Choochuen; Boonsong Imtim; Asdawut Mitilee; Vinya Seechomchuen; Pornchai Tesdee; Tanawoot Waipinid; Sutee Chimchai | Singapore (SIN); Neo Aik Jin Clement; Tan Renyi Jerry; Gan Chea Hau; Kiang Jian Xiang; Hong Oz Titus Mong Zi; Loh Zhi Ying; Tan Jit Lun Shawn; Tan Chun Leng |
| 500 m (12-crew) | Thailand (THA); Laor Iamluek; Nattagun Baengtid; Tanawoot Waipinid; Ekkapong Wongunjai; Chaiyakarn Choochuen; Pornchai Tesdee; Vinya Seechomchuen; Sutee Chimchai; Pornprom Kramsuk; Wanchat Thani; Boonsong Imtim; Asdawut Mitilee; Thotsaporn Pholseth; Phawonrat Roddee | Myanmar (MYA); Gay Saw Htoo; Min Zaw; Aye Kyaw Saw; Aung Saw Moe; Lwin Htet Wai; Aung Zaw Moe; Naing Min; Thu Thiha; Hein Sai San; Saw Lawkal; Zaw Min Min; Htet Zaw; AungSai Min; Oo Myo Theto | Singapore (SIN); Neo Aik Jin Clement; How Wei Min; Tan Renyi Jerry; Gan Chea Hau; KongPeng Hui; Barath Kumar; Kiang Jian Xiang; Tan Yong Zhi Esmonde; Hong Oz Titus Mong Zi; Loh Zhi Ying; Lam Yi He; Tan Jit Lun Shawn; Lim Wee Siang; Tan Chun Leng |

=== Women ===
| Event | Gold | Silver | Bronze |
|---|---|---|---|
| 200 m (6-crew) | Thailand (THA); Nutcharat Chimbanrai; Nattakant Boonruang; Pranchalee Moonkasem; Jaruwan Chaikan; Mintra Mannok; Patthama Nanthain; Arisara Pantulap; Wanida Thammarat | Myanmar (MYA); Moe Naw Arkar; Phyo Pyae Pyae; Win Pa Pa; The Cho; Phyo Su Wai; Naing Thet Phyo; Phaw Naw Sae Khu; Thu Saw Myat | Philippines (PHI); Maria Eucelia Manatad; Raquel Almencion; Ella Fe Niuda; Rosalyn Esguerra; Rea Glore; Glaiza Liwag; Patricia Ann Bustamante; Maribeth Caranto |
| 200 m (12-crew) | Indonesia (INA); Astri Dwijayanti; Wina Apriani; Ayuning Tika Vihari; Septivina; Riana Yulistrian; Ririn Nurparidah; Ririn Anggraini; Fazriah Nurbayan; Marnia; Alliyah Koesmarlina Sari; Shifa Garnika Nurkarim; Itsnah Tsaniah; Aswiati; Cristina Kafolakari | Thailand (THA); Nutcharat Chimbanrai; Nattakant Boonruang; Pranchalee Moonkasem; Wanida Thammarat; Prapaporn Pumkhunthod; Suphatthra Kheha; Jaruwan Chaikan; Arisara Pantulap; Saowanee Khamsaeng; Patthama Nanthain; Praewpan Kawsri; Mintra Mannok; Nipaporn Nopsri; Jariya Kankasikam | Myanmar (MYA); Hlaing Thin Yu; Soe Hay Mar; Thu Saw Myat; Aung War War; Phyo Su Wai; Phaw Naw Sae Khu; Win Pa Pa; Moe Naw Arkar; May Aye Chan; Soe Myint Myint; Thein Aye Aye; Phyo Pyae Pyae; The Cho; Naing Thet Phyo |
| 500 m (6-crew) | Thailand (THA); Nutcharat Chimbanrai; Nattakant Boonruang; Pranchalee Moonkasem; Nipaporn Nopsri; Mintra Mannok; Arisara Pantulap; Prapaporn Pumkhunthod; Patthama Nanthain | Myanmar (MYA); Moe Naw Arkar; Phyo Pyae Pyae; Win Pa Pa; The Cho; Phyo Su Wai; Naing Thet Phyo; Phaw Naw Sae Khu; Thu Saw Myat | Singapore (SIN); Loh Peixuan; Chan Shona Wai Kay; Chen Qiujun Jennifer; Ng Shanice Xuening; Wee Zheng Joyce; Kang Yu Jia; Nai Diana Min Zhen; Ng Ji Yan |
| 500 m (12-crew) | Thailand (THA); Nutcharat Chimbanrai; Nattakant Boonruang; Pranchalee Moonkasem; Wanida Thammarat; Prapaporn Pumkhunthod; Suphatthra Kheha; Jaruwan Chaikan; Arisara Pantulap; Saowanee Khamsaeng; Patthama Nanthain; Praewpan Kawsri; Mintra Mannok; Nipaporn Nopsri; Jariya Kankasikam | Myanmar (MYA); Hlaing Thin Yu; Soe Hay Mar; Thu Saw Myat; Aung War War; Phyo Su Wai; Phaw Naw Sae Khu; Win Pa Pa; Moe Naw Arkar; May Aye Chan; Soe Myint Myint; Thein Aye Aye; Phyo Pyae Pyae; The Cho; Naing Thet Phyo | Singapore (SIN); Loh Peixuan; Chan Shona Wai Kay; Chen Qiujun Jennifer; Ng Shanice Xuening; Wee Zheng Joyce; Kang Yu Jia; Nai Diana Min Zhen; Ng Ji Yan; Choong Pamela Peiling; Han Sze Yi Christie; Hu Qinmei; Leong Yin Xian Ellycia; Lim Xiaowei; Ong Hayden |

== Medal table ==
* Host nation (Singapore)

| Rank | Nation | Gold | Silver | Bronze | Total |
|---|---|---|---|---|---|
| 1 | Thailand (THA) | 5 | 3 | 0 | 8 |
| 2 | Indonesia (INA) | 2 | 0 | 0 | 2 |
| 3 | Myanmar (MYA) | 1 | 5 | 2 | 8 |
| 4 | Singapore (SIN)* | 0 | 0 | 5 | 5 |
| 5 | Philippines (PHI) | 0 | 0 | 1 | 1 |
| Totals (5 entries) | | 8 | 8 | 8 | 24 |
