= Canoeing at the 2015 SEA Games – Women's K-2 500 metres =

The Women's K-2 500 metres event at the 2015 SEA Games took place on 8 June 2015 at Marina Channel.

There will be six teams set to take part in this event.

== Schedule ==
All times are Singapore Standard Time (UTC+08:00)

Date	Time	Event
Monday, 8 June 2015	10:00	Final

== Start list ==
Lane	Nation	Athletes
2	Thailand (THA)	BOONYUHONG Woraporn; SUANSAN Kanokpan
3	Vietnam (VIE)	DO Thi Thanh Thao; VU Thi Linh
4	Indonesia (INA)	MASRIPAH Masripah; SOKOY Erni
5	Singapore (SIN)	CHEN Jiexian Stephenie; SEAH Suzanne
6	Myanmar (MYA)	TUN Myo Thandar; LWIN Cho Mar
7	Malaysia (MAS)	MAT RAZIK Akmal Idayu; NGAH Fatimah

== Results ==
Rank	Lane	Nation	Athletes	Time
