= Canoeing at the 2015 SEA Games – Men's K-2 200 metres =

The Men's K-2 200 metres event at the 2015 SEA Games took place on 9 June 2015 at Marina Channel. Six teams took part in the event.

== Schedule ==
All times are Singapore Standard Time (UTC+08:00)

Date	Time	Event
Tuesday, 9 June 2015	10:10	Final

== Start list ==
Lane	Nation	Athletes
2	Myanmar (MYA)	SHA Saw Kay; TUN Yazar
3	Vietnam (VIE)	TRUONG Van Hoai; LE Van Dung
4	Indonesia (INA)	YGANDIE Gandie; HARJITO Mugi
5	Singapore (SIN)	NASIMAN Muhammad Syaheenul Aiman; TOH Mervyn Yingjie
6	Thailand (THA)	MANEEJAK Chatkamon; CHAKKHIAN Chanrit
7	Malaysia (MAS)	ARIS Adam; SALLEH Mohd Khairulniza

== Results ==
Rank	Lane	Nation	Athletes	Time
