= Attapon Uea-aree =

Thai sport shooter (born 1989)

Personal information
- Nationality: Thai
- Born: 18 November 1989 (age 36)

Sport
- Sport: Shooting
Medal record
Men's shooting
Representing Thailand
Asian Championships
Gold medal – first place	2015 Kuwait City	50 m rifle prone

Attapon Uea-aree (born 18 November 1989) is a Thai sport shooter, Asian champion and Olympic participant in rifle shooting.

== Career ==
Uea-aree placed second in 50m rifle prone in the shooting at the 2015 SEA Games. He won a gold medal in 50m rifle prone at the 2015 Asian Shooting Championships.

He competed at the 2016 Summer Olympics in Rio de Janeiro, in the men's 50 metre rifle prone, where he qualified for the final and placed eighth.
