= Jane Vongvorachoti =

Thai long-distance runner

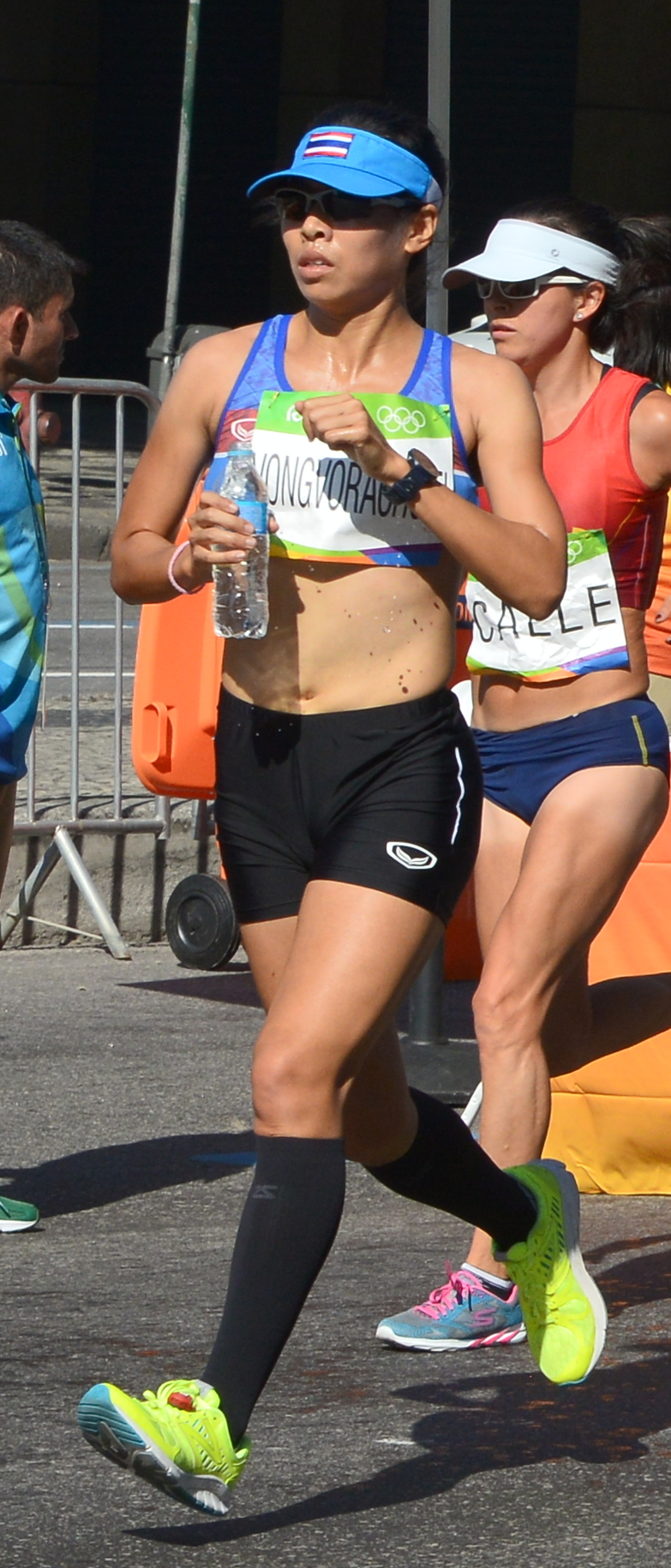
- Vongvorachoti at the 2016 Olympics

Personal information
- Nationality: Thai
- Born: 7 January 1984 (age 42) New York City, New York, USA
- Height: 166 cm (5 ft 5 in)
- Weight: 53 kg (117 lb)

Sport
- Sport: Athletics
- Event: Marathon
- Club: Henwood's Hounds Racing Team, NY, U.S.
- Coached by: John Henwood

Achievements and titles
- Personal best: 2:40:40 (2014)
Medal record
Representing Thailand
Southeast Asian Games
Bronze medal – third place	2015 Singapore	10,000 m

Jane Vongvorachoti (born 7 January 1984) is a Thai long-distance runner.

Vongvorachoti studied in the United States and has a degree in health administration from Columbia University. In 2014, she was named New York Road Runners' Runner of the Year for her age group. She won a bronze medal in the 10,000 metres at the 2015 Southeast Asian Games. She placed 91st in the 2016 Olympic marathon.
