= Lau Ywen =

Singaporean fencer (born 2000)

Ywen Lau
Personal information
- Born: 24 January 2000 (age 26) Singapore

Fencing career
- Sport: Fencing
- Country: Singapore
- Weapon: Sabre
- Hand: Right-handed
- Club: Asgard Fencing Club
- Head coach: David Chan
- FIE ranking: ranking

Ywen Lau (Chinese: 刘懿文; pinyin: Liú Yìwén; born 24 January 2000) is a Singaporean sabre fencer.

== Education ==
Lau studied at United World College of South East Asia. In 2017, Lau was accepted to study at Stanford University in California, United States in September 2018.

== Biography ==
Lau represented Singapore at the 2014 Asian Games as the youngest participant ever in the fencing competition. In 2014 she became the first female fencer representing Singapore to reach the quarter-finals of the 2014 Asian Fencing Championship. Lau is currently ranked number 1 on the senior level in Singapore for Women's Sabre, she also finished in the 25th spot at the 2015 Cadet & Junior World Fencing Championships.

Lau won a gold medal at the 2016 Cadet & Junior World Fencing Championships held in Bourges, France, as well as a silver medal at the 2016 Asian Fencing Cadet Championships.

In 2017, Lau won the gold medal in the 2017 Southeast Asian Games in Kuala Lumpur, Malaysia.

Her elder sister is reportedly her inspiration for taking up fencing.

She represents Asgard Fencing in Singapore.

== Awards ==
- 2017 SEA Games, Women's Sabre Individual - Gold
- 2016 Cadet & Junior World Fencing Championships, Women's Sabre - Gold
- 2016 Asian Fencing Cadet Championships, Women's Sabre - Gold
- 2015 SEA Games, Women's Sabre Team - Bronze
- 2015 SEA Games, Women's Sabre Individual - Bronze
- 2014 Korea Asian Fencing Championships – Quarter-finalist
- 2014 Singapore Fencing Singapore International – Gold
- 2014 Southeast Asia Fencing Cadet (U-17) Championships – Gold
- 2014 Singapore Cadet (U-17) World Cup – Gold
- 2014 Southeast Asia Fencing Championships (Senior) – 5th
