= Canoeing at the 2015 SEA Games – Women's K-4 200 metres =

The Women's K-4 200 metres canoeing event at the 2015 SEA Games took place June 9, 2015, at Marina Channel in Marina Bay, Singapore.

Thailand won the gold medal, while Singapore and Indonesia won the silver and bronze medal respectively.

== Schedule ==
All times are Singapore Standard Time (UTC+08:00)

Date	Time	Event
Tuesday, 9 June 2015	10:20	Final

== Start list ==
Lane	Nation	Athletes
2	Malaysia (MAS)	IBRAHIM Nor Azita; NGAH Fatimah; WAHAB Fatin Ajeerah; MAT RAZIK Akmal Idayu
3	Thailand (THA)	SRIPADUNG Chayanin; YAMPRASERT Porncharus; SUANSAN Kanokpan; BOONYUHONG Woraporn
4	Vietnam (VIE)	NGUYEN Thi Hai Yen; DO Thi Thanh Thao; MA Thi Tuyet; DUONG Thi Bich Loan
5	Singapore (SIN)	LEE Wei Ling Geraldine; SOH Sze Ying; NG Annabelle Xiang Ru; CHEN Sarah Jiemei
6	Indonesia (INA)	SOKOY Erni; MASRIPAH Masripah; RAMADANI Riska Elpia; KADOP Yunita
7	Myanmar (MYA)	HTAY Htay; LWIN Cho Mar; TUN Myo Thandar; WIN Su Myat

== Results ==
Rank	Lane	Nation	Athletes	Time
1st place, gold medalist(s)	3	Thailand (THA)	SRIPADUNG Chayanin; YAMPRASERT Porncharus; SUANSAN Kanokpan; BOONYUHONG Woraporn	38.391
2nd place, silver medalist(s)	5	Singapore (SIN)	LEE Wei Ling Geraldine; SOH Sze Ying; NG Annabelle Xiang Ru; CHEN Sarah Jiemei	38.443
3rd place, bronze medalist(s)	6	Indonesia (INA)	SOKOY Erni; MASRIPAH Masripah; RAMADANI Riska Elpia; KADOP Yunita	39.491
4	7	Myanmar (MYA)	HTAY Htay; LWIN Cho Mar; TUN Myo Thandar; WIN Su Myat	41.544
5	4	Vietnam (VIE)	NGUYEN Thi Hai Yen; DO Thi Thanh Thao; MA Thi Tuyet; DUONG Thi Bich Loan	41.568
6	2	Malaysia (MAS)	IBRAHIM Nor Azita; NGAH Fatimah; WAHAB Fatin Ajeerah; MAT RAZIK Akmal Idayu	46.028
