= Pim-on Klaisuban =

Thai sports shooter (born 1992)

Personal information
- Born: 7 July 1992 (age 32)

Sport
- Sport: Sports shooting

Pim-on Klaisuban (born 7 July 1992) is a Thai sports shooter. She competed in the women's 10 metre air pistol event at the 2016 Summer Olympics.
