= Thailand at the 2015 SEA Games =

Thailand at the 2015 Southeast Asian Games
- IOC code: THA
- NOC: National Olympic Committee of Thailand
- Website: www.olympicthai.or.th/eng (in English and Thai)

in Singapore
- Competitors: 744 in 36 sports
- Flag bearer: Chanathip Songkrasin (football)
- Medals Ranked 1st: Gold 95 Silver 83 Bronze 69 Total 247

Southeast Asian Games appearances (overview)
- 1961; 1965; 1967; 1969; 1971; 1973; 1975; 1977; 1979; 1981; 1983; 1985; 1987; 1989; 1991; 1993; 1995; 1997; 1999; 2001; 2003; 2005; 2007; 2009; 2011; 2013; 2015; 2017; 2019; 2021; 2023; 2025; 2027; 2029

Thailand participated in the 2015 Southeast Asian Games from 5 to 16 June 2015.

== Competitors ==
Sport	Men	Women	Total
Diving	2	2	4
Swimming	14	13	27
Synchronised swimming	0	7	7
Water polo	13	13	26
Archery	8	8	16
Athletics	41	36	77
Badminton	10	10	20
Basketball	12	12	24
Billiards and snooker	9	2	11
Bowling	6	6	12
Boxing	6	4	10
Canoeing	12	7	19
Cycling	6	2	8
Equestrian	1	3	4
Fencing	12	12	24
Field hockey	18	18	36
Floorball	20	20	40
Football	30	0	30
Golf	4	3	7
Gymnastics–Artistic	6	6	12
Gymnastics–Rhythmic	0	8	8
Judo	5	5	10
Netball	0	12	12
Pencak silat	10	6	16
Pétanque	6	6	12
Rowing	25	12	37
Rugby sevens	12	12	24
Sailing	17	18	35
Sepak takraw	23	8	31
Shooting	18	14	32
Softball	17	17	34
Squash	5	3	8
Table tennis	5	5	10
Taekwondo	7	7	14
Tennis	5	5	10
Traditional boat race	14	14	28
Triathlon	2	1	3
Volleyball	12	12	24
Waterskiing	3	5	8
Wushu	5	0	5
Others	-10	0	-10
Total	411	354	765

== Medal summary ==
=== Medal by sport ===
Medals by sport
Sport	Rank	1st place, gold medalist(s)	2nd place, silver medalist(s)	3rd place, bronze medalist(s)	Total
Archery	4	1	2	–	3
Athletics	1	17	13	9	39
Basketball	4	–	–	1	1
Badminton	3	2	1	2	5
Billiards and Snooker	6	1	1	5	7
Bowling	3	1	1	1	3
Boxing	3	2	3	3	8
Canoeing	2	4	6	1	11
Cycling	3	1	3	–	4
Diving	4	–	–	2	2
Equestrian	4	–	–	2	2
Fencing	3	1	2	7	10
Field hockey	3	–	1	–	1
Floorball	2	–	2	–	2
Football	1	1	–	–	1
Golf	1	4	–	1	5
Gymnastics	4	1	2	2	5
Judo	2	3	5	1	9
Netball	3	–	–	1	1
Pencak silat	4	3	1	–	4
Pétanque	1	8	–	–	8
Rowing	3	2	4	3	9
Rugby sevens	2	1	–	–	1
Sailing	3	2	6	8	16
Sepak takraw	1	5	1	–	1
Shooting	1	14	7	3	24
Softball	2	–	1	–	1
Squash	5	–	–	2	2
Swimming	4	1	10	5	16
Table Tennis	2	1	3	2	6
Taekwondo	3	3	2	3	8
Tennis	1	6	2	3	11
Traditional Boat Race	1	5	3	–	8
Triathlon	3	–	–	1	1
Volleyball	1	2	–	–	2
Water polo	2	1	–	1	2
Waterskiing	4	2	1	–	3
Wushu	8	-	-	–	3
Total	1	95	83	69	247

=== Medal by date ===
Medals by date
Day	Date	1st place, gold medalist(s)	2nd place, silver medalist(s)	3rd place, bronze medalist(s)	Total
–3	2 June	0	1	1	2
–2	3 June	0	1	3	4
–1	4 June	2	1	3	6
0	5 June	–	–	–	–
1	6 June	8	11	7	26
2	7 June	10	10	5	25
3	8 June	4	6	7	17
4	9 June	14	10	9	33
5	10 June	8	14	6	28
6	11 June	9	8	8	25
7	12 June	16	6	5	27
8	13 June	7	6	5	18
9	14 June	9	9	5	23
10	15 June	6	0	4	10
11	16 June	2	0	1	3
Total		95	83	69	247

=== Medalists ===
Medal	Name	Sport	Event	Date
Gold	Nontapat Panchan	Fencing	Men's individual foil	4 June 2015
Gold	Suthasini Sawettabut	Table tennis	Women's singles	4 June 2015
Gold	Radomyos Matjiur	Swimming	Men's 200 metre breaststroke	6 June 2015
Gold	Team: Kasemsit Borriboonwasin; Piyaphan Phaophat; Anusorn Sommit; Nathaworn Waenphrom	Canoeing	Men's K-4 1000 metres	6 June 2015
Gold	Masayuki Terada	Judo	Men's 66 kg	6 June 2015
Gold	Thanakorn Sangkaew	Pétanque	Men's shooting	6 June 2015
Gold	Pongsaton Panyatong	Shooting	Men's 10m air rifle team	6 June 2015
Gold	Team: Pongsaton Panyatong; Napis Tortungpanich; Apichakli Ponglaokham	Shooting	Men's 10m air rifle	6 June 2015
Gold	Team: Laor Iamluek; Tanawoot Waipinid; Thotsaporn Pholseth; Pornchai Tesdee; Vinya Seechomchuen; Pornprom Kramsuk; Boonsong Imtim; Wanchat Thani	Traditional Boat Race	Men's TBR 6-Crew, 200m	6 June 2015
Gold	Team: Nutcharat Chimbanrai; Nattakant Boonruang; Pranchalee Moonkasem; Jaruwan Chaikan; Mintra Mannok; Patthama Nanthain; Arisara Pantulap; Wanida Thammarat	Traditional Boat Race	Women's TBR 6-Crew, 200m	6 June 2015
Gold	Natthaya Thanaronnawat	Athletics	Women's Marathon	7 June 2015
Gold	Surattana Thongsri	Judo	Women's 63-70 kg	7 June 2015
Gold	Team: Chitchanok Yusri; Jutamas Butket; Butsaya Bunrak; Tidarat Sawatnam; Thanachporn Wandee; Piyamat Chomphumee; Uthumporn Liamrat; Rasamee Sisongkham; Naritsara Worakitsirikun; Rattanaporn Wittayaronnayut; Jeeraporn Peerabunanon; Nuengruethai Jaemit	Rugby sevens	Women's tournament	7 June 2015
Gold	Team: Eekkawee Ruenphara; Kamol Prasert; Khanawut Rungrot; Witsarut Srisawat; Komin Naonon; Noppadon Kongthawthong; Thongchai Sombatkerd; Pongphan Obthom	Sepak takraw	Chinlone-Non-repetition Primary	7 June 2015
Gold	Team: Boonthong Sowsa-nga; Thanawut Thammawai; Permphun Tapanya	Shooting	Men's precision pistol team	7 June 2015
Gold	Team: Phongpha Pholprajug; Tanyaporn Prucksakorn; Pim-On Klaisuban	Shooting	Women's 10m air pistol team	7 June 2015
Gold	Thanawut Thammawai	Shooting	Men's precision pistol	7 June 2015
Gold	Team: Laor Iamluek; Nattagun Baengtid; Tanawoot Waipinid; Ekkapong Wongunjai; Chaiyakarn Choochuen; Pornchai Tesdee; Vinya Seechomchuen; Sutee Chimchai; Pornprom Kramsuk; Wanchat Thani; Boonsong Imtim; Asdawut Mitilee; Thotsaporn Pholseth; Phawonrat Roddee	Traditional boat race	Men's TBR 12-Crew, 500m	7 June 2015
Gold	Team: Nutcharat Chimbanrai; Nattakant Boonruang; Pranchalee Moonkasem; Wanida Thammarat; Prapaporn Pumkhunthod; Suphatthra Kheha; Jaruwan Chaikan; Arisara Pantulap; Saowanee Khamsaeng; Patthama Nanthain; Praewpan Kawsri; Mintra Mannok; Nipaporn Nopsri; Jariya Kankasikam	Traditional boat race	Women's TBR 12-Crew, 500m	7 June 2015
Gold	Team: Nutcharat Chimbanrai; Nattakant Boonruang; Pranchalee Moonkasem; Nipaporn Nopsri; Mintra Mannok; Arisara Pantulap; Prapaporn Pumkhunthod; Patthama Nanthain	Traditional boat race	Women's TBR 6-Crew, 500m	7 June 2015
Gold	Kunathip Yea-on	Judo	Men's +100 kg	8 June 2015
Gold	Nantawan Fueangsanit	Pétanque	Women's singles	8 June 2015
Gold	Team: Anuwat Chaichana; Siriwat Sakha; Thawisak Thongsai; Pornchai Kaokaew; Panupong Petlue; Pattarapong Yupadee; Thanawat Chumsena; Somporn Jaisinghol; Assadin Wongyota; Sittipong Khamchan; Kritsanapong Nontakote; Sahachat Sakhoncharoen	Sepak takraw	Men's team	8 June 2015
Gold	Team: Pattarasuda Sowsa-nga; Angsana Niamrassamee; Rapassanan Tananamornpong	Shooting	Women's precision pistol team	8 June 2015
Gold	Porranot Purahong	Athletics	Men's pole vault	9 June 2015
Gold	Mingkamon Koomphon	Athletics	Women's hammer throw	9 June 2015
Gold	Team: Anusorn Sommit; Aditep Srirchart; Nathaworn Waenphroom; Kasemsit Borriboonwasin	Canoeing	Men's K-4 200 metres	9 June 2015
Gold	Team: Woraporn Boonyuhong; Kanokpan Suansan	Canoeing	Women's K-2 200 metres	9 June 2015
Gold	Team: Chayanin Sripadung; Porncharus Yamprasert; Kanokpan Suansan; Woraporn Boonyuhong	Canoeing	Women's K-4 200 metres	9 June 2015
Gold	Rartchawat Kaewpanya	Gymnastics	Men's pommel horse	9 June 2015
Gold	Team: Sarawut Sriboonpeng; Nattaya Yoothong	Pétanque	Mixed doubles	9 June 2015
Gold	Kamolwan Chanyim	Sailing	Female Laser Radial	9 June 2015
Gold	Team: Attapon Uea-Aree; Supalerk Wijan; Tavarit Majcharcheep	Shooting	50 m rifle prone team	9 June 2015
Gold	Jiranunt Hathaichukiat	Shooting	Men's skeet	9 June 2015
Gold	Team: Tanapat Jangpanich; Jiranunt Hathaichukiat; Pittipoom Phasee	Shooting	Men's skeet team	9 June 2015
Gold	Team: Pattarasuda Sowsa-nga; Angsana Niamrassamee; Rapassanan Tananamornpong	Shooting	Women's Precision pistol team	9 June 2015
Gold	Team: Sanchai Ratiwatana; Sonchat Ratiwatana; Danai Udomchoke; Kittipong Wachiramanowong	Tennis	Men's team	9 June 2015
Gold	Team: Luksika Kumkhum; Noppawan Lertcheewakarn; Tamarine Tanasugarn; Varatchaya Wongteanchai	Tennis	Women's team	9 June 2015
Gold	Promrob Juntima	Athletics	Men's shot put	10 June 2015
Gold	Natta Nachan	Athletics	Women's javelin throw	10 June 2015
Gold	Praprut Chaithanasakun; Thawat Sujaritthurakarn; Suriya Suwannasingh	Billiards and snooker	Men's English Billiard Team	10 June 2015
Gold	Wuttichai Masuk	Boxing	Men's Light Welter Wt. (64kg)	10 June 2015
Gold	Tassamalee Thongjan	Boxing	Women's Featherweight (57kg)	10 June 2015
Gold	Natthaphong Phonoppharat	Sailing	Male Windsurfing RSX	10 June 2015
Gold	Supalerk Wijan	Shooting	Men's 50m rifle prone	10 June 2015
Gold	Ratchadaporn Plengsaengthong	Shooting	Women's 50m rifle prone	10 June 2015
Gold	Jamras Rittidet	Athletics	Men's 110m hurdles	11 June 2015
Gold	Team: Pooriphat Kaijun; Srikharin Wannasa; Saharat Sammayan; Kunanon Sukkaew	Athletics	Men's 4x400m Relay	11 June 2015
Gold	Peerachet Jantra	Athletics	Men's javelin throw	11 June 2015
Gold	Wallapa Punsoongneun	Athletics	Women's 100m hurdles	11 June 2015
Gold	Chayanisa Chomchuendee	Athletics	Women's pole vault	11 June 2015
Gold	Team: Thaloengkoat Phusa-At; Sarawut Sriboonpeng	Pétanque	Men's doubles	11 June 2015
Gold	Team: Thongsri Thamakord; Phantipha Wongchuvej	Pétanque	Women's doubles	11 June 2015
Gold	Team: Porntawat Inlee; Ruthtanapol Theppibal	Rowing	Men's Lightweight doubles sculls 500 m	11 June 2015
Gold	Team: Kanyakorn Hirunphoem; Naphaswan Yangpaiboon; Tanyaporn Prucksakorn	Shooting	Women's 25m pistol Team	11 June 2015
Gold	Kunanon Sukkaew	Athletics	Men's 400m	12 June 2015
Gold	Team: Ruttanapon Sowan; Aphisit Promkaew; Jirapong Meenapra; Jaran Sathoengram	Athletics	Men's 4x100m Relay	12 June 2015
Gold	Supanara Sukhasvasti	Athletics	Men's long jump	12 June 2015
Gold	Team: Thipat Supawan; Khanrutai Pakdee; Phatsorn Jaksuninkorn; Tassaporn Wannakit	Athletics	Women's 4x100m Relay	12 June 2015
Gold	Subenrat Insaeng	Athletics	Women's discus throw	12 June 2015
Gold	Sunisa Khotseemueang	Athletics	Women's Heptathlon	12 June 2015
Gold	Wanida Boonwan	Athletics	Women's high jump	12 June 2015
Gold	Team: Busanan Ongbamrungphan; Duanganong Aroonkesorn; Jongkolphan Kititharakul; Kunchala Voravichitchaikul; Nitchaon Jindapol; Porntip Buranaprasertsuk; Puttita Supajirakul; Ratchanok Intanon; Rawinda Prajongjai; Sapsiree Taerattanachai	Badminton	Women's team	12 June 2015
Gold	Jutatip Maneephan	Cycling	Women's criterium	12 June 2015
Gold	Natipong Srithong	Golf	Men's individual	12 June 2015
Gold	Team: Kasidit Lepkurte; Tawan Phongphun; Natipong Srithong; Sarit Suwannarut	Golf	Men's team	12 June 2015
Gold	Suthavee Chanachai	Golf	Women's individual	12 June 2015
Gold	Team: Pajaree Anannarukarn; Suthavee Chanachai; Benyapa Niphatsophon	Golf	Women's team	12 June 2015
Gold	Team: Anuwat Chaichana; Suwicha Tala; Pornchai Kaokaew; Panupong Petlue; Pattarapong Yupadee; Assadin Wongyota; Seksan Tubtong; Pornthep Wapisiri; Sahachat Sakhoncharoen	Sepak takraw	Men's team doubles	12 June 2015
Gold	Team: Sununta Majchacheep; Supamas Wankaew; Vitchuda Pichitkanjanakul	Shooting	Women's 50m rifle 3 positions Team	12 June 2015
Gold	Padiwat Jaemjan	Waterskiing	Men's WakeBoard	12 June 2015
Gold	Witthaya Thamwong	Archery	Men's individual recurve	13 June 2015
Gold	Team: Suksan Piachan; Thanakorn Sangkaew; Aumpawan Suwannaphruk	Pétanque	Mixed triples	13 June 2015
Gold	Team: Kaewjai Pumsawangkaew; Fueangfa Praphatsarang; Sasiwimol Janthasit; Wanwisa Jankaen; Wiphada Chitphuan	Sepak takraw	Women's regu	13 June 2015
Gold	Chanatip Sonkham	Taekwondo	Women's under 49kg	13 June 2015
Gold	Akkarin Kitwijarn	Taekwondo	Men's under 63kg	13 June 2015
Gold	Team: Sanchai Ratiwatana; Sonchat Ratiwatana	Tennis	Men's doubles	13 June 2015
Gold	Noppawan Lertcheewakarn	Tennis	Women's singles	13 June 2015
Gold	Yannaphon Larpapharat	Bowling	Men's masters	14 June 2015
Gold	Adilan Chemaeng	Pencak silat	Men's 60 kg	14 June 2015
Gold	Pornteb Poolkaew	Pencak silat	Men's 65 kg	14 June 2015
Gold	Suda Lueangaphichat	Pencak silat	Women's 55 kg	14 June 2015
Gold	Phuttaraksa Neegree	Rowing	Women's Lightweight Single (1000m)	14 June 2015
Gold	Peerathep Sila-On	Taekwondo	Men's under 74kg	14 June 2015
Gold	Warit Sornbutnark	Tennis	Men's singles	14 June 2015
Gold	Team: Noppawan Lertcheewakarn; Varatchaya Wongteanchai	Tennis	Women's doubles	14 June 2015
Gold	Team: Padiwat Jaemjan; Tatsanai Kuakoonrat; Pattanan Pamonpol; Saitip Lara Rotrakarn; Panyapa Tangsirirat	Waterskiing	Mixed WakeBoard Team	14 June 2015
Gold	Team: Pranisa Nilklad; Yuwadee Seenoon; Soracha Sangkaman; Wataniya Nilklad; Alwani Sathitanon; Sarocha Rewrujirek; Papimol Munchawanont; Varistha Saraikarn; Satakamol Wongpairoj; Kornkarn Puengpongsakul; Varisa Wangvongcharoen; Sineenart Sonthipakdee; Paveenuch Phandphoung	Water polo	Women's tournament	15 June 2015
Gold	Team: Pinyo Inpinit; Tristan Do; Chanin Sae-Eae; Somporn Yos; Adisorn Promrak; Sarach Yooyen; Pakorn Prempak; Artit Daosawang; Suriya Singmui; Nurul Sriyankem; Chaowat Veerachat; Thitipan Puangchan; Tanaboon Kesarat; Chenrop Samphaodi; Peerapat Notechaiya; Chananan Pombuppha; Chanathip Songkrasin; Narubadin Weerawatnodom; Siwakorn Jakkuprasat; Rungrath Poomchantuek	Football	Men	15 June 2015
Gold	Team: Suranath Phadungsap; Thaloengkiat Phusa-At; Suksan Piachan; Thanakorn Sangkaew	Pétanque	Men's triples	15 June 2015
Gold	Team: Nantawan Fueangsanit; Aumpawan Suwannaphruk; Thongsri Thamakord; Phantipha Wongchuvej	Pétanque	Women's triples	15 June 2015
Gold	Team: Masaya Duangsri; Somruedee Pruepruk; Payom Srihongsa	Sepak takraw	Women's doubles	15 June 2015
Gold	Team: Wanna Buakaew; Piyanut Pannoy; Pleumjit Thinkaow; Onuma Sittirak; Hattaya Bamrungsuk; Pimpichaya Kokram; Chatchu-on Moksri; Wilavan Apinyapong; Pornpun Guedpard; Nootsara Tomkom; Ajcharaporn Kongyot	Volleyball	Women	15 June 2015
Gold	Team: Jirayu Raksakaew; Montri Vaenpradab; Kissada Nilsawai; Yossapol Wattana; Khanit Silapasorn; Kittikun Sriutthawong; Montri Phuanglib; Kitsada Somkane; Teerasak Nakprasok; Saranchit Charoensuk; Kittinon Namkhunthod; Kitsada Chanchai	Volleyball	Men	16 June 2015
Gold	Busanan Ongbumrungpan	Badminton	Women's singles	16 June 2015
Silver	Team: Chanakarn Udomsilp; Padasak Tanviriyavechakul	Table tennis	Men's doubles	2 June 2015
Silver	Team: Suthasini Sawettabut; Padasak Tanviriyavechakul	Table tennis	Mixed doubles	3 June 2015
Silver	Sirawalai Starrat	Fencing	Women's individual sabre	4 June 2015
Silver	Phiangkhwan Pawapotako	Swimming	Women's 400 metre individual medley	6 June 2015
Silver	Team: Jenjira Srisa-ard; Kornkarnjana Sapianchai; Benjaporn Sriphanomthorn; Natthanan Junkrajang	Swimming	Women's 4×100 metre freestyle relay	6 June 2015
Silver	Ammiga Himathonghom	Swimming	Women's 800 metre freestyle	6 June 2015
Silver	Wichan Jaitieng	Canoeing	Men's K-1 1000 metres	6 June 2015
Silver	Team: Chatkamon Maneejak; Chanrit Chakkhian	Canoeing	Men's K-2 1000 metres	6 June 2015
Silver	Team: Tissanupan Wichianpradit; Robert Tee Kriangkum; Ratthasat Kanboon; Jamorn Rommanee; Weena Chokpaoumpai; Rartchawat Kaewpanya	Gymnastics	Men's artistic team	6 June 2015
Silver	Sarawut Petsing	Judo	Men's -66 kg	6 June 2015
Silver	Nopachai Kocharat	Judo	Men's 73-81 kg	6 June 2015
Silver	Napis Tortungpanich	Shooting	Men's 10m air rifle	6 June 2015
Silver	Team: Laor Iamluek; Tanawoot Waipinid; Thotsaporn Pholseth; Pornchai Tesdee; Vinya Seechomchuen; Pornprom Kramsuk; Boonsong Imtim; Wanchat Thani; Nattagun Baengtid; Ekkapong Wongunjai; Chaiyakarn Choochuen; Sutee Chimchai; Asdawut Mitilee; Phawonrat Roddee	Traditional Boat Race	Men's TBR 12-Crew, 200m	6 June 2015
Silver	Team: Nutcharat Chimbanrai; Nattakant Boonruang; Pranchalee Moonkasem; Jaruwan Chaikan; Mintra Mannok; Patthama Nanthain; Arisara Pantulap; Wanida Thammarat; Prapaporn Pumkhunthod; Suphatthra Kheha; Saowanee Khamsaeng; Praewpan Kawsri; Nipaporn Nopsri; Jariya Kankasikam	Traditional Boat Race	Women's TBR 12-Crew, 200m	6 June 2015
Silver	Radomyos Matjiur	Swimming	Men's 100 metre breaststroke	7 June 2015
Silver	Phiangkhwan Pawapotako	Swimming	Women's 200 metre individual medley	7 June 2015
Silver	Team: Patsara Manunya; Pornsawan Ngernrungruangroj; Tonpan Pokeaw; Sirawalai Starrat	Fencing	Women's team sabre	7 June 2015
Silver	Boonthung Srisung	Athletics	Men's Marathon	7 June 2015
Silver	Sitthipong Niemkunchon	Judo	Men's 90-100 kg	7 June 2015
Silver	Orapin Senatham	Judo	Women's 57-63 kg	7 June 2015
Silver	Team: Khanawut Rungrot; Witsarut Srisawat; Pongphan Obthom; Komin Naonon; Kamol Prasert; Thongchai Sombatkerd; Noppadon Kongthawthong; Eekkawee Ruenphara	Sepak takraw	Chinlone-Same stroke	7 June 2015
Silver	Team: Pongsaton Panyatong; Napis Tortungpanich; Apichakli Ponglaokham	Shooting	Men's 10m air pistol Team	7 June 2015
Silver	Pim-On Klaisuban	Shooting	Women's 10m air pistol	7 June 2015
Silver	Team: Nutcharat Chimbanrai; Nattakant Boonruang; Pranchalee Moonkasem; Nipaporn Nopsri; Mintra Mannok; Arisara Pantulap; Prapaporn Pumkhunthod; Patthama Nanthain	Traditional Boat Race	Men's TBR 6-Crew, 500m	7 June 2015
Silver	Napat Wesshasartar	Swimming	Men's 50 metre freestyle	8 June 2015
Silver	Team: Kornkarnjana Sapianchai; Patarawadee Kittiya; Benjaporn Sriphanomthorn; Natthanan Junkrajang	Swimming	Women's 4 × 200 metre freestyle relay	8 June 2015
Silver	Team: Kornkarnjana Sapianchai; Patarawadee Kittiya	Canoeing	Women's K-2 500 metres	8 June 2015
Silver	Team: Chayanin Sripadung; Porncharus Yamprasert; Thanyaluk Aoenthachai; Varipan Chocngamwong	Canoeing	Women's K-4 500 metres	8 June 2015
Silver	Thonthan Satjadet	Judo	Women's +78 kg	8 June 2015
Silver	Team: Tamolwan Khetkhuan; Nanthana Komwong; Piyaporn Pannak; Orawan Paranang; Suthasini Sawettabut	Table tennis	Women's team	8 June 2015
Silver	Natthanan Junkrajang	Swimming	Women's 200 metre freestyle	9 June 2015
Silver	Tantipong Phetchaiya	Athletics	Men's hammer throw	9 June 2015
Silver	Varunyoo Kongnil	Athletics	Men's triple jump	9 June 2015
Silver	Tassaporn Wannakit	Athletics	Women's 100m	9 June 2015
Silver	Panwat Gimsrang	Athletics	Women's hammer throw	9 June 2015
Silver	Annop Arromsaranon	Bowling	Men's singles	9 June 2015
Silver	Aditep Srichart	Canoeing	Men's K-1 200 metres	9 June 2015
Silver	Orasa Thiangkathok	Canoeing	Women's C-1 200 metres	9 June 2015
Silver	Apiwat Sringam	Sailing	Male Youth Laser Radial (U19)	9 June 2015
Silver	Kanapan Pachatikapanya	Sailing	Female youth Laser Radial (U19)	9 June 2015
Silver	Team: Araya Wongvat; Phiangkhwan Pawapotako; Patarawadee Kittiya; Natthanan Junkrajang	Swimming	Women's 4 × 100 metre medley relay	10 June 2015
Silver	Jaran Sathoengram	Athletics	Men's 200m	10 June 2015
Silver	Chatchawal Polyiam	Athletics	Men's shot put	10 June 2015
Silver	Sawitri Thongchao	Athletics	Women's shot put	10 June 2015
Silver	Team: Kritsanut Lertsattayatthorn; Ratchayothin Yotharuck	Billiards and snooker	Men's snooker doubles	10 June 2015
Silver	Team: Kritsanut Lertsattayatthorn; Ratchayothin Yotharuck	Billiards and snooker	Men's snooker doubles	10 June 2015
Silver	Tanes Ongjunta	Boxing	Men's Bantam Weight (56kg)	10 June 2015
Silver	Aphisit Khankhokkhruea	Boxing	Men's Middle Weight (75kg)	10 June 2015
Silver	Chuthamat Raksat	Boxing	Women's light flyweight (45kg-48kg)	10 June 2015
Silver	Rartchawat Kaewpanya	Gymnastics	Men's parallel bars	10 June 2015
Silver	Siripon Kaewduang-Ngam	Sailing	Female Windsurfing RSX	10 June 2015
Silver	Attapon Uea-Aree	Shooting	Men's 50m rifle prone	10 June 2015
Silver	Thanyalak Chotphibunsin	Shooting	Women's 50m rifle prone	10 June 2015
Silver	Team: Waranya Buaphan; Vasana Teewavech; Nareerat Sutta; Thanapan Saisud; Waraporn Konyuen; Pinit Lee-udom; Ancheera Sirimaha; Paweena Sangkong; Natthaya Paengma; Parima Phandakiri; Wannaporn Punjaroen; Chompoonut Klongseema; Sasithorn Neangjumnong; Suwanan Singhaampon; Tassaneewan Kwaopanya; Kanjanaporn Klomklom; Kantrakorn Jittsaree	Softball	Women	10 June 2015
Silver	Phiangkhwan Pawapotako	Swimming	Women's 200 metre breaststroke	11 June 2015
Silver	Narong Benjaroon	Athletics	Men's discus throw	11 June 2015
Silver	Hussadin Rodmanee	Athletics	Men's javelin throw	11 June 2015
Silver	Team: Supanich Poolkerd; Atchima Eng-Chuan; Pornpan Hoemhuk; Treewadee Yongphan	Athletics	Women's 4x400m Relay	11 June 2015
Silver	Thurakit Boonratanathanakorn	Cycling	Men's individual Time Trial	11 June 2015
Silver	Chanpeng Nontasin	Cycling	Women's individual Time Trial	11 June 2015
Silver	Phuttaraksa Neegree	Rowing	Women's Lightweight Single (500m)	11 June 2015
Silver	Natphanlert Auapinyakul	Shooting	Men's 50m pistol	11 June 2015
Silver	Kotchakorn Khamrueangsri	Athletics	Women's Heptathlon	12 June 2015
Silver	Team: Bodin Isara; Boonsak Ponsana; Khosit Phetpradab; Maneepong Jongjit; Nipitphon Phuangphuapet; Pakkawat Vilailak; Sudket Prapakamol; Suppanyu Avihingsanon; Tanongsak Saensomboonsuk; Wannawat Ampunsuwan	Badminton	Men's team	12 June 2015
Silver	Team: Jesdaporn Tongsun; Yanisa Pimsan; Salocha Losakul; Kanya Jantapet; Sukanya Ritngam; Panadda Krumram; Supansa Samanso; Benjamas Bureewan; Chantree Yungyuen; Anongnat Piresram; Sirikwan Wongkaew; Boonta Duang-Urai; Tikhamporn Sakunpithak; Kanyanut Nakpolkrung; Prapassorn Khuiklang; Kornkanok Sanpoung; Siraya Yimkrajang; Praphatsorn Khamsaeng	Field hockey	Women	12 June 2015
Silver	Supamas Wankaew	Shooting	Women's 50m rifle 3 positions	12 June 2015
Silver	Team: Katesara Kiatatchawachai; Wanida Raksasri; Pich-Chapha Tanakitcharoenpat	Taekwondo	Women's team poomsae	12 June 2015
Silver	Tatsanai Kuakoonrat	Waterskiing	Men's WakeBoard	12 June 2015
Silver	Jutatip Maneephant	Cycling	Women's mass start road race	13 June 2015
Silver	Suthon Yampinid	Sailing	Male optimist (U16)	13 June 2015
Silver	Team: Panida Suksomporn; Narisara Yu-Sawat	Sailing	Female 470	13 June 2015
Silver	Kamonchanok Klahan	Sailing	Female optimist (U16)	13 June 2015
Silver	Phannapa Harnsujin	Taekwondo	Women's under 53kg	13 June 2015
Silver	Varatchaya Wongteanchai	Tennis	Women's singles	13 June 2015
Silver	Team: Kanyavee Maneesombatkul; Sunee Detchokul; Nareumon Junsook	Archery	Women's team compound	14 June 2015
Silver	Team: Chanchai Pratheepwatanawong; Kanyavee Maneesombatkul	Archery	Mixed team compound	14 June 2015
Silver	Team: Trasama Promyart; Wiros Yosiri; Gorawee Srikaew; Veerasak Pimpa; Norrawich Intani; Pisit Samanmit; Pitsanu Kannala; Tanakit Juntakian; Sattaya Phoosinoi; Watcharapon Onsuk; Alexander Rinefalk; Thanakrit Boon-art; Narawidch Songngam; Chonnakan Kruarod; Autthachai Sohtree; Monthon Prakotchue; Teerawat Pongchawee; Surapong Sangmongkhol; Aphichet Ratanaprathum; Pornphon Phuttharakkhit	Floorball	Men's tournament	14 June 2015
Silver	Team: Onuma Doungsuda; Nattida Chanted; Sunisa Utta; Pichavee Yoolai; Mutmee Maneepura; Supasuta Thiptha; Somlak Suttiprapa; Nasha Jutawijittam; Thararat Duangporn; Khwanchanok Suksin; Nina Marianne Suppa; Ornpanee Watcharoen; Thanaporn Tongkham; Vilaiporn Jornburom; Aunchleeporn Hinmalai; Sunaree Thoengkhunthod; Wibunsiri Phetpraphai; Nattawan Ounmuangthong; Pornsuree Toemsombatbowon; Sornsawan Bungnasaeng	Floorball	Women's tournament	14 June 2015
Silver	Nanthachai Khansakhon	Pencak silat |Men's 55 kg	14 June 2015	
Silver	Team: Nuttapong Sampromcharee; Pichakorn Puangpet; Sitthakarn Painsawan; Poonlap Maigerd; Chaichana Thakum; Somporn Mueangkhot; Sakon Somwat; Nawamin Deenoi; Weerawat Srichai	Rowing	Men's Eights (1000m)	14 June 2015
Silver	Jaruwat Saensuk	Rowing	Men's Lightweight Single (1000m)	14 June 2015
Silver	Team: Tippaporn Pitukpaothai; Rojjana Raklao	Rowing	Women's Lightweight Double (1000m)	14 June 2015
Silver	Team: Peangtarn Plipuech; Sonchat Ratiwatana	Tennis	Mixed doubles	14 June 2015
Bronze	Team: Komwong Nanthana; Suthasini Sawettabut	Table tennis	Women's doubles	2 June 2015
Bronze	Panthawit Chamcharern	Fencing	Men's individual épée	3 June 2015
Bronze	Wiradech Kothny	Fencing	Men's sabre	3 June 2015
Bronze	Nunta Chantasuvannasin	Fencing	Women's individual foil	3 June 2015
Bronze	Wijitta Takhamwong	Fencing	Women's individual Épée	4 June 2015
Bronze	Pornsawan Ngernrungruangroj	Fencing	Women's individual Sabre	4 June 2015
Bronze	Padasak Tanviriyavechakul	Table tennis	Men's singles	4 June 2015
Bronze	Team: Theerapat Siriboon; Yotsawat Juntaphadawon	Diving	Men's synchronized 10 metre platform	6 June 2015
Bronze	Benjaporn Sriphanomthorn	Swimming	Women's 800 metre freestyle	6 June 2015
Bronze	Team: Panthawit Chamcharern; Supoj Chavalanarumit; Naphat Klueanphet; Wongsathon Songpraphai	Fencing	Men's team épée	6 June 2015
Bronze	Kachakorn Warasiha	Judo	Women's -52 kg	6 June 2015
Bronze	Team: Yada Boonkong; Rattiyakorn Buathong; Paweena Kamwan; Wirawan Khorwanna; Pimchanok Kongsub; Kliawked Panchutturud; Sirima Samnaree; Pacharee Sangjan; Viyada Sankam; Siriwan Seenongsaeng; Rungnapa Seetongbon; Jitraphon Siriwong	Netball	Women	6 June 2015
Bronze	Team: Sununta Majchacheep; Thanyalak Chotphibunsin; Supaluk Pimpan	Shooting	Women's 10m air rifle Team	6 June 2015
Bronze	Sanruthai Arunsiri	Triathlon	Women's individual	6 June 2015
Bronze	Team: Jiratchaya Yothongyos; Surincha Booranapol	Diving	Women's synchronized 10 metre platform	7 June 2015
Bronze	Thawat Sujaritthurakarn	Billiards and snooker	Men's Eng. Billiards Singles (500)	7 June 2015
Bronze	Praprut Chaithanasakun	Billiards and snooker	Men's Eng. Billiards Singles (500)	7 June 2015
Bronze	Team: Mayakarn Sopanut; Panchan Nontapat; Phakungkoon Thapanun; Sritang-Orn Suppakorn	Fencing	Men's team foil	7 June 2015
Bronze	Team: Kamonchanok Klahan; Saranwong Poonpat; Voravong rachrattanaruk; Chanokchon Wangsuk; Suthon Yampinid	Sailing	Team racing optimist (U16)	7 June 2015
Bronze	Praprut Chaithanasakun	Billiards and snooker	Men's English billiards singles	8 June 2015
Bronze	Siraphat Chitchomnart	Billiards and snooker	Women's 9-Ball Pool Singles	8 June 2015
Bronze	Saylom Ardee	Boxing	Men's Lightweight (60kg)	8 June 2015
Bronze	Apichet Saensit	Boxing	Men's welterweight (69kg)	8 June 2015
Bronze	Sopida Satumrum	Boxing	Women's Flyweight (51kg)	8 June 2015
Bronze	Team: Sailub Lertratanachai; Siengsaw Lertratanachai; Korntawat Samran	Equestrian	Jumping team	8 June 2015
Bronze	Pattarasuda Sowsa-nga	Shooting	Women's precision pistol	8 June 2015
Bronze	Sutasinee Pankaew	Swimming	Women's 200 metre butterfly	9 June 2015
Bronze	Sanchai Namkhet	Athletics	Men's 5000m	9 June 2015
Bronze	Team: Praprut Chaithanasakun; Thawat Sujaritthurakarn	Billiards and snooker	Men's English billiards doubles	9 June 2015
Bronze	Team: Chatkamon Maneejak; Chanrit Chakkhian	Canoeing	Men's K-2 200 metres	9 June 2015
Bronze	Weena Chokpaoumpai	Gymnastics	Men's rings	9 June 2015
Bronze	Team: Wiwat Poonpat; Anun Daochanterk; Tossaphon Jonjaitrong	Sailing	Male Fleet Racing Keelboat	9 June 2015
Bronze	Keerati Bualong	Sailing	Male Laser standard	9 June 2015
Bronze	Team: Jongkol Channart; Sai Chimsawat; Benjamas Poonpat; Yupa Tananong	Sailing	Female Fleet Racing Keelboat	9 June 2015
Bronze	Pittipoom Phasee	Shooting	Men's skeet	9 June 2015
Bronze	Ammiga Himathongkom	Swimming	Women's 400 metre freestyle	10 June 2015
Bronze	Jirapong Meenapra	Athletics	Men's 200m	10 June 2015
Bronze	Yothin Yaprajan	Athletics	Men's 800m	10 June 2015
Bronze	Wassana Winatho	Athletics	Women's 400m hurdles	10 June 2015
Bronze	Areerat Intadis	Athletics	Women's shot put	10 June 2015
Bronze	Sailub Lertratanachai	Equestrian	Jumping individual	10 June 2015
Bronze	Team: Kasipat Chograthin; Radomyos Matjiur; Navaphat Wongcharoen; Napat Wesshasartar	Swimming	Women's 4 × 100 metre medley relay	11 June 2015
Bronze	Kasipat Chograthin	Swimming	Men's 50 metre breaststroke	11 June 2015
Bronze	Yothin Yaprajan	Athletics	Men's 1500m	11 June 2015
Bronze	Kwanchai Numsomboon	Athletics	Men's discus throw	11 June 2015
Bronze	Jane Vongvorachoti	Athletics	Women's 10000m	11 June 2015
Bronze	Thitima Muangjan	Athletics	Women's triple jump	11 June 2015
Bronze	Jaruwat Saensuk	Rowing	Men's Lightweight Single (500m)	11 June 2015
Bronze	Prem Nampratueng	Rowing	Men's single sculls (500m)	11 June 2015
Bronze	Team: Kim Bolleby; Atchariya Cheng; Phumin Klanbida; Annop Arromsaranon; Surasak Manuwong; Yannaphon Larpapharat	Bowling	Men's team of 5	12 June 2015
Bronze	Tawan Phongphun	Golf	Men's individual	12 June 2015
Bronze	Anantana Prasertratanakul; Panisa Suwanarat; Tuddaw Thamronglarb	Squash	Women's team	12 June 2015
Bronze	Wilasinee Khamsribusa	Taekwondo	Women's under 46kg	12 June 2015
Bronze	Team: Sattawath Chomchuen; Tasana Manso	Taekwondo	Mixed Pair Poomsae	12 June 2015
Bronze	Team: Thanapong Kamonvat; Navee Thamsoontorn	Sailing	Male 470	13 June 2015
Bronze	Nutthawee Klompong	Taekwondo	Men's under 58kg	13 June 2015
Bronze	Team: Warit Sornbutnark; Kittipong Wachiramanowong	Tennis	Men's doubles	13 June 2015
Bronze	Team: Peangtarn Plipuech; Tamarine Tanasugarn	Tennis	Women's doubles	13 June 2015
Bronze	Team: Tamarine Tanasugarn; Sanchai Ratiwatana	Tennis	Mixed doubles	13 June 2015
Bronze	Panjarat Prawatyotin	Gymnastics	Women's rhythmic individual all-around	14 June 2015
Bronze	Team: Kritiyya Harirak; Patchareeya Jardsakul; Sawittree Laksoongnoen; Matinee Raruen	Rowing	Women's Lightweight Four (1000m)	14 June 2015
Bronze	Team: Puvich Chanyim; Sarawut Phetsiri	Sailing	Male Youth 420 (U19)	14 June 2015
Bronze	Team: Jongkol Channart; Sai Chimsawat; Benjamas Poonpat; Yupa Tananong	Sailing	Female Match Racing Keelboat	14 June 2015
Bronze	Team: Piriyaporn Kangkla; Chaninat Poolsirikot	Sailing	Female youth 420 (U19)	14 June 2015
Bronze	Tanongsak Saensomboonsuk	Badminton	Men's singles	15 June 2015
Bronze	Team: Sudket Prapakamol; Sapsiree Taerattanachai	Badminton	Mixed doubles	15 June 2015
Bronze	Team: Phromrat Suree; Jantakan Juthamas; Kunchuan Supavadee; Mathuros Juthathip; Sangtad Suwimon; Yothanan Penphan; Kruatiwa Naphat; Maihom Thidaporn; Chirdpetcharat Chonticha; Janthabut Pattrawadee; Kaichaiyapoom Atchara; Rudrodkij Supranee	Basketball	Women's tournament	15 June 2015
Bronze	Team: Phuwis Poonsiri; Chatchawin Tangjaitrong	Squash	Men's jumbo doubles	15 June 2015
Bronze	Team: Meathus Chetamee; Terdtong Klinubol; Wanjak Suwanchart; Pinit Chaisombat; Patipol Phandphoung; Julanut Jintanugool; Naruedon Niwasakul; Sornthum Wongpairoj; Ronnakrit Jarananon; Pruetthikorn Khunprathum; Pattanit Chompoosang; Ekkaphan Jaengprajak; Pitipong Ruchisereekul	Water polo	Men's tournament	16 June 2015

=== Multiple medalists ===
Multiple medalists with at least 2 gold medal

Name	Sport	Gold	Silver	Bronze	Total
Nattakant Boonruang	Traditional boat race	3	1	0	4
Nutcharat Chimbanrai	Traditional boat race	3	1	0	4
Pranchalee Moonkasem	Traditional boat race	3	1	0	4
Arisara Pantulap	Traditional boat race	3	1	0	4
Noppawan Lertcheewakarn	Tennis	3	0	0	3
Thanakorn Sangkaew	Pétanque	3	0	0	3
Woraporn Boonyuhong	Canoeing	2	1	0	3
Jaruwan Chaikan	Traditional boat race	2	1	0	3
Mintra Mannok	Traditional boat race	2	1	0	3
Patthama Nanthain	Traditional boat race	2	1	0	3
Nipaporn Nopsri	Traditional boat race	2	1	0	3
Sonchat Ratiwatana	Tennis	2	1	0	3
Kanokpan Suansan	Canoeing	2	1	0	3
Pornchai Tesdee	Traditional boat race	2	1	0	3
Varatchaya Wongteanchai	Tennis	2	1	0	3
Boonsong Imtim	Traditional boat race	2	0	2	4
Thotsaporn Pholseth	Traditional boat race	2	0	2	4
Vinya Seechomchuen	Traditional boat race	2	0	2	4
Tanawoot Waipinid	Traditional boat race	2	0	2	4
Sununta Majchacheep	Shooting	2	0	1	3
Sanchai Ratiwatana	Tennis	2	0	1	3
Kasemsit Borriboonwasin	Canoeing	2	0	0	2
Anuwat Chaichana	Sepak takraw	2	0	0	2
Suthavee Chanachai	Golf	2	0	0	2
Nantawan Fueangsanit	Pétanque	2	0	0	2
Jiranunt Hathaichukiat	Shooting	2	0	0	2
Padiwat Jaemjan	Waterskiing	2	0	0	2
Pornchai Kaokaew	Sepak takraw	2	0	0	2
Pornprom Kramsuk	Traditional boat race	2	0	0	2
Busanan Ongbumrungpan	Badminton	2	0	0	2
Pongsaton Panyatong	Shooting	2	0	0	2
Panupong Petlue	Sepak takraw	2	0	0	2
Thaloengkoat Phusa-at	Pétanque	2	0	0	2
Suksan Piachan	Pétanque	2	0	0	2
Ratchadaporn Plengsaengthong	Shooting	2	0	0	2
Tanyaporn Prucksakorn	Shooting	2	0	0	2
Sahachat Sakhoncharoen	Sepak takraw	2	0	0	2
Anusorn Sommit	Canoeing	2	0	0	2
Sarawut Sriboonpeng	Pétanque	2	0	0	2
Natipong Srithong	Golf	2	0	0	2
Kunanon Sukkaew	Athletics	2	0	0	2
Aumpawan Suwannaphruk	Pétanque	2	0	0	2
Thongsri Thamakord	Pétanque	2	0	0	2
Thanawut Thammawai	Shooting	2	0	0	2
Nathaworn Waenphrom	Canoeing	2	0	0	2
Supalerk Wijan	Shooting	2	0	0	2
Phantipha Wongchuvej	Pétanque	2	0	0	2
Assadin Wongyota	Sepak takraw	2	0	0	2
Pattarapong Yupadee	Sepak takraw	2	0	0	2
