= Radomyos Matjiur =

Thai swimmer (born 1988)

Personal information
- Born: April 2, 1988 (age 38) Bangkok, Thailand

Sport
- Sport: Swimming
- Strokes: Breaststroke
Medal record
Representing Thailand
SEA Games
Gold medal – first place	2015 Singapore	200m breaststroke
Gold medal – first place	2013 Naypyidaw	100m breaststroke
Silver medal – second place	2005 Laguna	200m individual medley
Silver medal – second place	2007 Nakhon Ratchasima	200m individual medley
Silver medal – second place	2007 Nakhon Ratchasima	4x200m freestyle relay
Silver medal – second place	2011 Palembang	100m breaststroke
Silver medal – second place	2013 Naypyidaw	200m breaststroke
Silver medal – second place	2013 Naypyidaw	4x100m medley relay
Silver medal – second place	2015 Singapore	100m breaststroke
Silver medal – second place	2017 Kuala Lumpur	200m breaststroke
Bronze medal – third place	2005 Laguna	4x100m freestyle relay
Bronze medal – third place	2007 Nakhon Ratchasima	100m breaststroke
Bronze medal – third place	2007 Nakhon Ratchasima	4x100m freestyle relay
Bronze medal – third place	2017 Kuala Lumpur	100m breaststroke

Radomyos Matjiur (born April 2, 1988) is a Thai breaststroke swimmer who won a gold medal at the 2013 Southeast Asian Games in the 100 m breaststroke. He currently holds the Thai records in swimming in the 100 m breaststroke, 100 m individual medley, 200 m individual medley and 4×50 m freestyle relay. Matjiur also won the 200 m breaststroke final at the Southeast Asian Games in Singapore. He competed in the 100 m breaststroke at the 2016 Summer Olympics in Rio de Janeiro.
