= Marina Channel =

Waterway in Singapore

Coordinates: 1°17′08.16″N 103°52′10.42″E

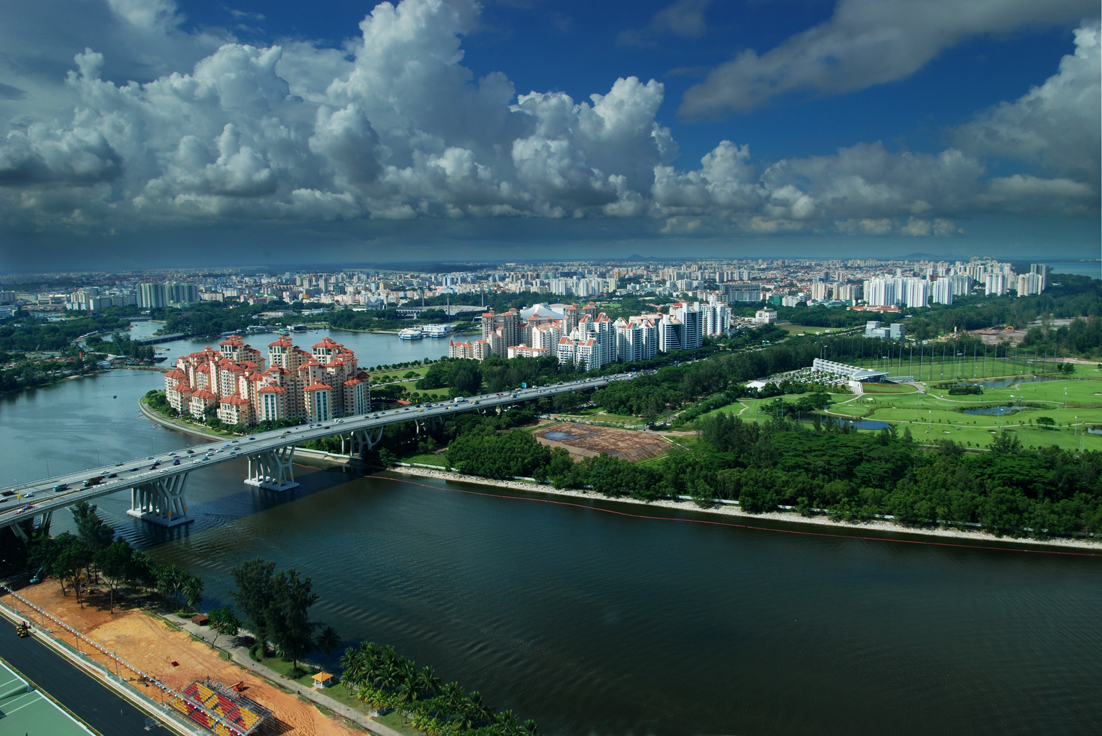
A view of the Marina Channel (foreground) and Kallang River (background) from atop the Singapore Flyer

Marina Channel is a waterway in southern Singapore that connects the Kallang Basin in the north and Marina Bay in the west to the Singapore Straits in the south. Formed as a result of land reclamation in the 1980s, the Marina Channel effectively shifted Singapore's southern coastline further southwards from the Kallang Basin area. Marina Channel serves to separate Marina East and Kallang in the east from Marina South in the west. Both sides are connected by Singapore's tallest bridge, the Benjamin Sheares Bridge.

The Marina Barrage that opened on 1 November 2008 dams up the Marina Channel as well as various other rivers and canals to form the Marina Reservoir, Singapore's first and only reservoir in the downtown.
