= Swimming at the 2025 SEA Games – Women's 4 × 100 metre freestyle relay =

Women's 4x100 metre freestyle relay at the 2025 SEA Games
- Venue: SAT Swimming Pool
- Date: 10 December
- Competitors: 7 from 7 nations
- Winning time: 3:44.26

Medalists
gold medal	Heather White, Chloe Isleta, Xiandi Chua, Kayla Sanchez	Philippines
silver medal	Gan Ching Hwee, Ashley Lim Yi-Xuan, Quah Jing Wen, Quah Ting Wen	Singapore
bronze medal	Nguyễn Kha Nhi, Võ Thị Mỹ Tiên, Nguyễn Thúy Hiền, Phạm Thị Vân	Vietnam

The women's 4 × 100 metre freestyle relay event at the 2025 SEA Games took place on 10 December 2025 at the SAT Swimming Pool in Bangkok, Thailand.

== Schedule ==
All times are Indochina Standard Time (UTC+07:00)

Date	Time	Event
Wednesday, 10 December 2025	19:42	Final

== Records ==
Prior to this competition, the existing world, Asian, and Southeast Asian Games records were as follows.

World Record	Australia; Mollie O'Callaghan (52.08); Shayna Jack (51.69); Meg Harris (52.29); Emma McKeon (51.90)	3:27.96	Fukuoka, Japan	23 July 2023
Asian Record	China; Yang Junxuan (52.48); Cheng Yujie (52.76); Zhang Yufei (52.75); Wu Qingfeng (52.31)	3:30.30	Paris, France	27 July 2024
Games Record	Singapore; Quah Ting Wen (54.80); Quah Jing Wen (56.01); Cherlyn Yeoh (54.96); Amanda Lim (55.15)	3:16.82	Capas, Philippines	6 December 2019

== Results ==
=== Final ===
Rank	Lane	Swimmer	Nationality	Time	Notes
1st place, gold medalist(s)	4	Heather White (56.08); Chloe Isleta (58.02); Xiandi Chua (56.37); Kayla Sanchez (53.79)	Philippines	3:44.26	NR
2nd place, silver medalist(s)	5	Gan Ching Hwee (56.33); Ashley Lim Yi-Xuan (57.41); Quah Jing Wen (56.92); Quah Ting Wen (55.87)	Singapore	3:46.53	
3rd place, bronze medalist(s)	1	Nguyễn Kha Nhi (57.47); Phạm Thị Vân (56.76); Võ Thị Mỹ Tiên (56.87); Nguyễn Thúy Hiền (56.37)	Vietnam	3:47.47	NR
4	3	Ploy Leelayana (57.88); Mia Millar (56.80); Kamonchanok Kwanmuang (57.72); Maria Nedelko (56.77)	Thailand	3:49.17	
5	2	Nadia Aisha Nurazmi (57.56); Serenna Karmelita Muslim (58.24); Niputa Pande Lisa Doimasari (58.64); Adelia Chantika Aulia (56.12)	Indonesia	3:50.56	NR
6	6	Wong Shi Qi (59.59); Lynna Yeow Yi Jing (59.00); Tan Rui Nee (1:00.24); Lim Shun Qi (58.29)	Malaysia	3:57.12	
7	7	Angelina Bella Messina (59.40); Ariana Dirkzwager (59.07); Astrid Malee Dirkzwager (1:01.10); Kaylonie Amphonesuh (1:04.29)	Laos	4:03.86	
