= Swimming at the 2025 SEA Games – Women's 4 × 200 metre freestyle relay =

Women's 4x200 metre freestyle relay at the 2025 SEA Games
- Venue: SAT Swimming Pool
- Date: 14 December
- Competitors: 6 from 6 nations
- Winning time: 8:10.10

Medalists
gold medal	Jinjutha Pholjamjumrus, Maria Nedelko, Kamonchanok Kwanmuang, Napatsawan Jaritkla	Thailand
silver medal	Heather White, Chloe Isleta, Xiandi Chua, Kayla Sanchez	Philippines
bronze medal	Nguyễn Kha Nhi, Võ Thị Mỹ Tiên, Nguyễn Thúy Hiền, Phạm Thị Vân	Vietnam

The women's 4 × 200 metre freestyle relay event at the 2025 SEA Games took place on 14 December 2025 at the SAT Swimming Pool in Bangkok, Thailand.

== Schedule ==
All times are Indochina Standard Time (UTC+07:00)

Date	Time	Event
Wednesday, 14 December 2025	19:42	Final

== Records ==
Prior to this competition, the existing world, Asian, and Southeast Asian Games records were as follows.

World Record	Australia; Mollie O'Callaghan (1:53.66); Shayna Jack (1:55.63); Brianna Throssell (1:55.80); Ariarne Titmus (1:52.41)	7:37.50	Fukuoka, Japan	27 July 2023
Asian Record	China; Yang Junxuan (1:54.37); Tang Muhan (1:55.00); Zhang Yufei (1:55.66); Li Bingjie (1:55.30)	7:40.33	Tokyo, Japan	29 July 2021
Games Record	Singapore; Gan Ching Hwee (2:02.30); Quah Ting Wen (2:00.69); Quah Jing Wen (2:02.15); Christie Chue (2:01.86)	8:07.00	Capas, Philippines	5 December 2019

== Results ==
=== Final ===
Rank	Lane	Swimmer	Nationality	Time	Notes
1st place, gold medalist(s)	3	Jinjutha Pholjamjumrus (2:02.43); Maria Nedelko (2:01.92); Kamonchanok Kwanmuang (2:01.46); Napatsawan Jaritkla (2:04.29)	Thailand	8:10.10	NR
2nd place, silver medalist(s)	5	Heather White (2:02.95); Chloe Isleta (2:04.61); Kayla Sanchez (1:59.86); Xiandi Chua (2:04.13)	Philippines	8:11.55	NR
3rd place, bronze medalist(s)	6	Nguyễn Kha Nhi (2:04.79); Võ Thị Mỹ Tiên (2:02.79); Phạm Thị Vân (2:03.47); Nguyễn Thúy Hiền (2:03.17)	Vietnam	8:14.22	NR
4	4	Gan Ching Hwee (1:59.10) NR; Victoria Carrie Lim Yiyan (2:05.35); Ashley Lim Yi-Xuan (2:06.77); Quah Jing Wen (2:03.54)	Singapore	8:14.76	
5	2	Serenna Karmelita Muslim (2:07.24); Adelia Chantika Aulia (2:07.24); Nadia Aisha Nurazmi (2:10.51); Niputa Pande Lisa Doimasari (2:10.71)	Indonesia	8:35.23	
6	7	Kelly Teo Yao (2:11.63); Tan Rui Nee (2:10.42); Lynna Yeow Yi Jing (2:11.10); Shannon Tan Yan Qing (2:11.03)	Malaysia	8:44.18	
