= Xiandi Chua =

Filipino swimmer

Personal information
- National team: Philippines; Suspended Member Federation (2023)
- Born: September 26, 2001 (age 25)
- Height: 170 cm (5 ft 7 in)

Sport
- Sport: Swimming
- Strokes: Backstroke, freestyle, individual medley
- College team: De La Salle University
- Coach: Carlos Brosas
Medal record
Women's swimming
Representing the Philippines
Event	1st	2nd	3rd
Southeast Asian Games	2	5	3
Total	2	5	3
Southeast Asian Games
Gold medal – first place	2023 Cambodia	200 m backstroke
Gold medal – first place	2025 Thailand	4×100 m freestyle relay
Silver medal – second place	2019 Philippines	4×100 m freestyle relay
Silver medal – second place	2023 Cambodia	4×100 m freestyle relay
Silver medal – second place	2025 Thailand	200 m backstroke
Silver medal – second place	2025 Thailand	4×200 m freestyle relay
Silver medal – second place	2025 Thailand	4×100 m medley relay
Bronze medal – third place	2019 Philippines	4×200 m freestyle relay
Bronze medal – third place	2023 Cambodia	400 m individual medley
Bronze medal – third place	2023 Cambodia	4×200 m freestyle relay

Xiandi Chua (born September 26, 2001) is a swimmer who has represented the Philippines internationally.

She is the holder of multiple national records for the Philippines. She has participated in the Southeast Asian (SEA) Games since 2019 and has earned a total of two gold, five silver, and three bronze medals. She also holds the meet record for the 200 m backstroke, which she won in the 2023 SEA Games.

She has also competed in the Asian Games and the long course and short course World Championships.

== Early life and education ==
Chua was born on September 26, 2001, and hails from San Juan, Metro Manila. Chua attended the Immaculate Conception Academy for her high school education.

== Career ==
=== Junior career ===
Chua competed in the 2013 Palarong Pambansa (transl. National Games) as a participant in the elementary division, earning one gold and one silver medal in relay events. She also competed in the 2019 Palarong Pambansa for the National Capital Region, this time in the secondary division, winning six gold medals.

Internationally, she competed in the Southeast Asia (SEA) Age Group Swimming Championships in 2014 and won medals for the Philippines at the 2015–2018 editions under the tutelage of coach Carlos Brosas. She also represented the Philippines in the 2015 FINA World Junior Swimming Championships in Singapore.

=== College career ===
Chua competed for the De La Salle Green Tankers in the University Athletic Association of the Philippines (UAAP). La Salle was the overall champions for the women's division of the swimming championship of Season 85 with Chua named Most Valuable Player. She earned six gold, one silver, and one bronze medal and broke four UAAP records. She was also named the UAAP Athlete of the Year for individual sports. That proved to be her final appearance with the then-ongoing COVID-19 pandemic and commitment to the national team preventing her appearance in Season 86.

=== Professional career ===
Chua participated in the 2019 Southeast Asian (SEA) Games held in the Philippines, earning one silver and one bronze medal. She won three medals at the 2021 Philippine Swimming, Inc. National Selection. She also competed for the Philippines in the 2021 SEA Games in Vietnam in May 2022.

In 2023, Chua participated in multiple events in Australia, including both the short and long course Australian Swimming Championships, setting multiple national records. Chua took part in the 2023 SEA Games in Cambodia where she won a gold medal in the 200 m backstroke event and set a new national and meet record at 2:13.20. She also won one silver and two bronze medals. She competed at the 2023 World Aquatics Championships in Fukuoka, Japan under the "Suspended Member Federation" team due to Philippine Swimming's suspension. Chua participated in the 2022 Asian Games held in 2023 in Hangzhou, China, reaching the finals stage and setting was then a new national record for the 200 m individual medley.

Chua participated at the long course 2024 World Aquatics Championships in Doha, Qatar. She also swam in the South Korea and Singapore legs of the 2024 World Aquatics Swimming World Cup. At the 2024 World Aquatics Swimming Championships (25 m) in Budapest, Hungary, Chua, Chloe Isleta, Jason Mahmutoglu, and Adrian Philip Eichler set a new Philippine national record by clocking 1:46.56 in the mixed 4 × 50 m medley relay.

At the 2025 short course Australian Swimming Championships, Chua broke additional national records for the 400 m individual medley and 200 m breaststroke events. She earned two gold medals and one bronze medal at the 20th Singapore National Swimming Championships. She competed in the 2025 SEA Games in Thailand, where she and Kayla Sanchez, Heather White, and Chloe Isleta won the Philippines' first gold medal in the women's 4 × 100 m freestyle relay, ending Singapore's streak of five consecutive gold-medal finishes in the event. She also earned three silver medals: one in an individual event and two in relay events. The results of all three relay events set new national records.

She competed in the 2026 Asian Games. In the 4 × 100 m freestyle relay event, the team was disqualified after a teammate dove too early. She set a new record for the Philippines in the 200 m individual medley event, completing the swim in 2:16.02.

== Awards ==
- UAAP Most Valuable Player (Women's swimming): Season 85 (2022–23)
- UAAP Athlete of the Year (Individual sports): Season 85 (2022–23)

== Competitive results ==
This section details Chua's results in major events as recorded in the World Aquatics website.

Year	Meet	100 m FR	200 m FR	100 m BK	200 m BK	200 m IM	400 m IM	4 × 100 m FR	4 × 200 m FR	4 × 100 m MR	4 × 100 m MxFR	4×50 m MxMR
Junior level
2015	FINA World Junior Swimming Championships	59	59	–	–	42	34	–	–	18	17	–
Senior level
2019	Southeast Asian Games	–	–	–	–	6	–	2nd place, silver medalist(s)	3rd place, bronze medalist(s)	–	–	–
2022	Southeast Asian Games	–	7	–	–	10	6	4	5	–	–	–
2023	Southeast Asian Games	–	–	–	1st place, gold medalist(s)	4	3rd place, bronze medalist(s)	2nd place, silver medalist(s)	3rd place, bronze medalist(s)	–	–	–
2023	World Aquatics Championships	–	–	–	23	–	25	–	–	–	–	–
2023	Asian Games	–	–	–	7	8	7	5	5	–	–	–
2024	World Aquatics Championships	–	–	–	21	–	18	12	–	–	–	–
2024	World Aquatics Swimming Championships (25 m)	–	–	–	26	26	23	–	–	–	–	27
2025	Southeast Asian Games	–	–	6	2nd place, silver medalist(s)	5	4	1st place, gold medalist(s)	2nd place, silver medalist(s)	2nd place, silver medalist(s)	–	–
2026	Asian Games	–	–	–	8	7	9	DSQ	DNS	DNS	–	–

== Swimming World Cup results ==
Year	Leg	50 m BK	200 m BK	100 m BR	50 m FL	200 m FL
2024	Shanghai, China	–	–	–	–	–
2024	Incheon, South Korea	15	9	19	21	–
2024	Singapore	–	9	13	–	7

== Collegiate competitions ==
Medal summary
Year	Competition	1st	2nd	3rd	Total
2022	University Athletic Association of the Philippines	6	1	0	7

Detailed results
Year	Competition	100 m FR	200 m FR	400 m FR	800 m FR	200 m BR	200 m IM	400 m IM
2022	University Athletic Association of the Philippines	1st place, gold medalist(s)	1st place, gold medalist(s)	1st place, gold medalist(s)	1st place, gold medalist(s)	2nd place, silver medalist(s)	1st place, gold medalist(s)	1st place, gold medalist(s)

== National records ==
=== Long course (50 m) ===
Event	Time	Meet	Country	Date	Notes	Ref
200 m backstroke	2:13.20	2023 SEA Games	Cambodia	May 8, 2023	also meet record	
200 m individual medley	2:16.02	2026 Asian Games	Japan	September 21, 2026		
400 m individual medley	4:46.81	2023 Australian Swimming Championships (50 m)	Australia	April 18, 2023		
4 × 100 m freestyle relay	3:44.26	2025 Southeast Asian Games	Thailand	December 10, 2025	with Heather White, Chloe Isleta, and Kayla Sanchez	
4 × 200 m freestyle relay	8:11.55	2025 Southeast Asian Games	Thailand	December 14, 2025	with Heather White, Chloe Isleta, and Kayla Sanchez	
4 × 100 m medley relay	4:09.33	2025 Southeast Asian Games	Thailand	December 15, 2025	with Miranda Renner, Heather White, and Kayla Sanchez	

=== Short course (25 m) ===
Event	Time	Meet	Country	Date	Notes	Ref
200 m backstroke	2:08.19	2023 Australian Swimming Championships (25 m)	Australia	September 14, 2023		
200 m breaststroke	2:34.58	2025 Australian Swimming Championships (25 m)	Australia	October 1, 2025		
400 m individual medley	4:43.19	2025 Australian Swimming Championships (25 m)	Australia	October 2, 2025		
4×50 m mixed medley relay	1:46.56	2024 World Aquatics Swimming Championships (25 m)	Hungary	December 11, 2024	with Jason Mahmutiglu, Chloe Isleta, and Adrian Eichler	

== Personal best results ==
=== Long course (50 m) ===
Event	Time	Meet	Country	Date	Notes	Ref
50 m freestyle	27.77	20th Singapore National Swimming Championships 2025	Singapore	May 31, 2025		
100 m freestyle	57.50	20th Singapore National Swimming Championships 2025	Singapore	May 31, 2025		
200 m freestyle	2:03.96	20th Singapore National Swimming Championships 2025	Singapore	June 1, 2025		
50 m backstroke	30.30	20th Singapore National Swimming Championships 2025	Singapore	May 31, 2025		
100 m backstroke	1:02.65	20th Singapore National Swimming Championships 2025	Singapore	May 31, 2025		
200 m backstroke	2:13.20	2023 Southeast Asian Games	Cambodia	May 8, 2023		
50 m breaststroke	37.11	2025 Australian Open Championships	Australia	April 23, 2025		
100 m breaststroke	1:17.47	2025 Australian Open Championships	Australia	April 23, 2025		
200 m breaststroke	2:40.06	2025 Australian Open Championships	Australia	April 23, 2025		
50 m butterfly	29.38	2025 Australian Open Championships	Australia	April 21, 2025		
100 m butterfly	1:05.54	2025 Southeast Asian Games	Thailand	December 13, 2025		
200 m butterfly	2:17.48	20th Singapore National Swimming Championships 2025	Singapore	June 3, 2025		
200 m individual medley	2:16.02	2026 Asian Games	Japan	September 21, 2026		
400 m individual medley	4:46.81	2023 Australian Swimming Championships (50 m)	Australia	April 18, 2023		
4 × 100 m freestyle relay	3:44.26	2025 Southeast Asian Games	Thailand	December 10, 2025	with Heather White, Chloe Isleta, and Kayla Sanchez	
4 × 200 m freestyle relay	8:11.55	2025 Southeast Asian Games	Thailand	December 14, 2025	with Heather White, Chloe Isleta, and Kayla Sanchez	
4 × 100 m medley relay	4:09.33	2025 Southeast Asian Games	Thailand	December 15, 2025	with Miranda Renner, Heather White, and Kayla Sanchez	
4 × 100 m freestyle relay (mixed)	3:52.37	2015 FINA World Junior Swimming Championships	Singapore	August 27, 2015	with Maurice Sacho Ilustre, Timothy Yen, and Chloe Daos	

=== Short course (25 m) ===
Event	Time	Meet	Country	Date	Notes	Ref
50 m backstroke	28.48	2024 World Aquatics Swimming World Cup	South Korea	October 24, 2024		
100 m backstroke	1:00.09	2023 Australian Swimming Championships (25 m)	Australia	September 13, 2023		
200 m backstroke	2:08.19	2023 Australian Swimming Championships (25 m)	Australia	September 14, 2023		
50 m breaststroke	33.49	2024 World Aquatics Swimming World Cup	Singapore	November 1, 2024		
100 m breaststroke	1:11.43	2024 World Aquatics Swimming World Cup	Singapore	November 1, 2024		
200 m breaststroke	2:34.58	2025 Australian Swimming Championships (25 m)	Australia	October 1, 2025		
50 m butterfly	28.16	2024 World Aquatics Swimming World Cup	South Korea	October 25, 2024		
100 m butterfly	1:03.16	2024 World Aquatics Swimming World Cup	Singapore	October 31, 2024		
200 m butterfly	2:14.10	2024 World Aquatics Swimming World Cup	Singapore	October 31, 2024		
200 m individual medley	2:13.37	2023 Australian Swimming Championships (25 m)	Australia	September 15, 2023		
400 m individual medley	4:43.19	2025 Australian Swimming Championships (25 m)	Australia	October 2, 2025		
4×50 m medley relay (mixed)	1:46.56	2024 World Aquatics Swimming Championships (25 m)	Hungary	December 11, 2024	with Jason Mahmutiglu, Chloe Isleta, and Adrian Eichler	

== See also ==
List of Philippine records in swimming
