= Swimming at the 2025 SEA Games – Women's 400 metre individual medley =

Women's 400 metre individual medley at the 2025 SEA Games
- Venue: SAT Swimming Pool
- Date: 13 December
- Competitors: 10 from 6 nations
- Winning time: 4:46.30

Medalists
gold medal	Kamonchanok Kwanmuang	Thailand
silver medal	Võ Thị Mỹ Tiên	Vietnam
bronze medal	Jinjutha Pholjamjumrus	Thailand

The women's 400 metre individual medley event at the 2025 SEA Games took place on 13 December 2025 at the SAT Swimming Pool in Bangkok, Thailand.

== Schedule ==
All times are Indochina Standard Time (UTC+07:00)

Date	Time	Event
Saturday, 13 December 2025	9:38	Heats
Saturday, 13 December 2025	19:25	Final

== Records ==
Prior to this competition, the existing world, Asian, and Southeast Asian Games records were as follows.

World Record	Summer McIntosh (CAN)	4:23.65	Victoria, Canada	11 June 2025
Asian Record	Ye Shiwen (CHN)	4:28.43	London, United Kingdom	28 July 2012
Games Record	Nguyễn Thị Ánh Viên (SGP)	4:42.88	Singapore, Singapore	6 June 2015

== Results ==
=== Heats ===
Rank	Heat	Lane	Swimmer	Nationality	Time	Notes
1	2	4	Kamonchanok Kwanmuang	Thailand	4:55.37	Q
2	1	5	Victoria Carrie Lim Yiyan	Singapore	5:00.38	Q
3	2	3	Jinjutha Pholjamjumrus	Thailand	5:00.50	Q
4	2	5	Võ Thị Mỹ Tiên	Vietnam	5:04.50	Q
5	1	4	Xiandi Chua	Philippines	5:05.09	Q
6	1	3	Nguyễn Ngọc Tuyết Hân	Vietnam	5:07.93	Q
7	2	2	Kyla Louise Bulaga	Philippines	5:11.84	Q
8	2	6	Michelle Surjadi Fang	Indonesia	5:12.55	Q
9	1	2	Jia Jia Yoong	Malaysia	5:20.43	R
10	1	6	Shannon Tan Yan Qing	Malaysia	5:20.52	R

=== Final ===
Rank	Lane	Swimmer	Nationality	Time	Notes
1st place, gold medalist(s)	4	Kamonchanok Kwanmuang	Thailand	4:46.30	
2nd place, silver medalist(s)	6	Võ Thị Mỹ Tiên	Vietnam	4:47.39	
3rd place, bronze medalist(s)	3	Jinjutha Pholjamjumrus	Thailand	4:47.62	
4	2	Xiandi Chua	Philippines	4:56.11	
5	5	Victoria Carrie Lim Yiyan	Singapore	4:56.51	
6	7	Nguyễn Ngọc Tuyết Hân	Vietnam	5:07.09	
7	1	Kyla Louise Bulaga	Philippines	5:08.52	
8	8	Jia Jia Yoong	Malaysia	5:20.84	
