= Swimming at the 2025 SEA Games – Men's 50 metre freestyle =

Men's 50 metre freestyle at the 2025 SEA Games
- Venue: SAT Swimming Pool
- Date: 11 December
- Competitors: 14 from 9 nations
- Winning time: 21.92

Medalists
gold medal	Mikkel Lee	Singapore
silver medal	Teong Tzen Wei	Singapore
bronze medal	Yu Jing Tong	Malaysia

The men's 50 metre freestyle event at the 2025 SEA Games took place on 11 December 2025 at the SAT Swimming Pool in Bangkok, Thailand.

== Schedule ==
All times are Indochina Standard Time (UTC+07:00)

Date	Time	Event
Wednesday, 11 December 2025	9:13	Heats
Wednesday, 11 December 2025	18:23	Final

== Records ==
Prior to this competition, the existing world, Asian and Games records were as follows.

World Record	César Cielo (BRA)	20.91	São Paulo, Brazil	18 December 2009
Asian Record	Ji Yu-chan (KOR)	21.66	Singapore	7 April 2019
Games Record	Jonathan Tan (SGP)	21.91	Phnom Penh, Cambodia	7 May 2023

== Results ==
=== Heats ===
Rank	Heat	Lane	Swimmer	Nationality	Time	Notes
1	2	4	Mikkel Lee	Singapore	22.23	Q
2	1	4	Teong Tzen Wei	Singapore	22.91	Q
3	2	6	Yu Jing Tong	Malaysia	22.92	Q
4	1	5	Luong Jérémie Loïc Nino	Vietnam	23.01	Q
4	2	5	Logan Noguchi	Philippines	23.01	Q
6	1	2	Pongpanod Trithan	Thailand	23.08	Q
7	1	3	Samuel Septionus	Indonesia	23.18	Q
8	2	2	Tonnam Kanteemool	Thailand	23.28	Q
9	1	6	Lim Yin Chuen	Malaysia	23.39	R
10	2	3	Jason Yusuf	Indonesia	23.54	R
11	1	1	Khant Phone Min	Myanmar	25.62	
12	2	1	Jirasak Khammavongkeo	Laos	26.87	
13	2	7	Ryuto Saysanavongphet	Laos	27.11	
14	2	8	Jolanio Guterres	Timor-Leste	30.52	

=== Final ===
Rank	Lane	Swimmer	Nationality	Time	Notes
1st place, gold medalist(s)	4	Mikkel Lee	Singapore	21.92	
2nd place, silver medalist(s)	5	Teong Tzen Wei	Singapore	22.42	
3rd place, bronze medalist(s)	3	Yu Jing Tong	Malaysia	22.48	NR
4	2	Logan Noguchi	Philippines	22.55	NR
5	6	Luong Jérémie Loïc Nino	Vietnam	22.86	
6	7	Pongpanod Trithan	Thailand	22.89	
7	1	Samuel Septionus	Indonesia	22.98	
8	8	Tonnam Kanteemool	Thailand	23.24	
