= 2024 World Aquatics Swimming Championships (25 m) – Mixed 4 × 50 metre medley relay =

Swimming competition

Mixed 4 × 50 metre medley relay at the 2024 World Aquatics Swimming Championships (25 m)
- Venue: Duna Arena
- Location: Budapest, Hungary
- Dates: 11 December (heats and final)
- Competitors: 178 from 41 nations
- Teams: 41
- Winning time: 1:35.36

Medalists
gold medal	Miron Lifintsev; Kirill Prigoda; Arina Surkova; Daria Trofimova; Pavel Samusenko; Oleg Kostin; Daria Klepikova
silver medal	Kylie Masse; Finlay Knox; Ilya Kharun; Ingrid Wilm	Canada
bronze medal	Shaine Casas; Michael Andrew; Regan Smith; Katharine Berkoff; AJ Pouch; Alex Shackell; Alex Walsh	United States

The mixed 4 × 50 metre medley relay event at the 2024 World Aquatics Swimming Championships (25 m) was held on 11 December 2024 at the Duna Arena in Budapest, Hungary.

== Records ==
Prior to the competition, the existing world and championship records were as follows.

World record	United States (USA)	1:35.15	Melbourne, Australia	14 December 2022
Competition record	United States (USA)	1:35.15	Melbourne, Australia	14 December 2022

== Background ==
The United States entered without three members of their 2022 world record-setting team, relying on Michael Andrew for breaststroke and Regan Smith and Katherine Berkoff to fill other legs. Italy also fielded a changed lineup, with Lorenzo Mora and Silvia Di Pietro returning, and Simone Cerasuolo joining. Canada returned with key names including Kylie Masse and Ilya Kharun. Great Britain fielded an entirely new team, and China and Australia were led by Qin Haiyang and Isaac Cooper respectively. The Netherlands returned most of their relay, and the Neutral Athletes B team featured Russian athletes Miron Lifintsev, Kirill Prigoda, and Arina Surkova.

SwimSwam wrote that predicting the winners of the mixed relays was "nigh impossible" due to the amount of variables. They predicted the Neutral Athletes B team would win, the USA would come second and Italy would come third.

== Results ==
=== Heats ===
The heats were started at 11:07.

Rank	Heat	Lane	Nation	Swimmers	Time	Notes
1	6	7	Canada	Kylie Masse (26.06); Finlay Knox (26.26); Ilya Kharun (21.06); Ingrid Wilm (23.88)	1:37.26	Q
2	5	5	Sweden	Louise Hansson (26.12); Daniel Kertes (25.67); Sara Junevik (24.55); Elias Persson (20.94)	1:37.28	Q, NR
3	5	8	United States	Shaine Casas (22.87); AJ Pouch (26.33); Alex Shackell (25.04); Alex Walsh (23.26)	1:37.50	Q
4	3	2	Australia	Iona Anderson (26.06); Joshua Yong (26.08); Matthew Temple (22.06); Meg Harris (23.57)	1:37.77	Q, OC
5	4	3	Japan	Kaiya Seki (23.5); Taku Taniguchi (25.32); Mizuki Hirai (25.26); Yume Jinno (24.1)	1:38.18	Q
6	5	7	Neutral Athletes B	Pavel Samusenko (23.13); Oleg Kostin (25.94); Daria Klepikova (25.61); Daria Trofimova (23.62)	1:38.30	Q
7	6	4	Italy	Lorenzo Mora (23.28); Ludovico Blu Art Viberti (25.9); Silvia Di Pietro (24.91); Chiara Tarantino (24.23)	1:38.32	Q
8	5	4	Netherlands	Kira Toussaint (26.48); Koen de Groot (25.97); Thomas Verhoeven (22.18); Milou van Wijk (23.84)	1:38.47	Q
9	4	4	Great Britain	Oliver Morgan (23.63); Angharad Evans (29.41); Joshua Gammon (22.58); Eva Okaro (23.42)	1:39.04	R
10	1	4	Neutral Athletes A	Anastasiya Shkurdai (26.73); Ilya Shymanovich (25.42); Grigori Pekarski (21.87); Anastasiya Kuliashova (25.05)	1:39.07	R
11	3	5	Spain	Carmen Weiler (26.80); Carles Coll (25.70); Mario Mollá (22.37); María Daza (24.24)	1:39.11	NR
12	6	3	Norway	Markus Lie (23.65); Nicholas Lia (25.98); Hedda Øritsland (25.6); Mari Moen (23.91)	1:39.14	
13	2	2	Croatia	Nikola Miljenić (23.37); Meri Mataja (29.69); Jana Pavalić (25.74); Jere Hribar (20.36)	1:39.16	NR
14	2	4	China	Wang Gukailai (23.53); Qin Haiyang (25.91); Lu Xingchen (26.04); Liu Shuhan (23.89)	1:39.37	
15	6	5	Estonia	Ralf Tribuntsov (23.11); Eneli Jefimova (28.93); Daniel Zaitsev (21.9); Maria Romanjuk (25.77)	1:39.71	
16	4	1	Poland	Ksawery Masiuk (24.11); Jan Kałusowski (26.21); Paulina Peda (25.69); Katarzyna Wasick (23.72)	1:39.73	
17	2	1	South Korea	Kim Seung-won (27.400); Choi Dong-yeol (26.03); Jeong So-eun (26.31); Ji Yu-chan (20.38)	1:40.12	NR
18	4	5	Finland	Ronny Brannkarr (24.09); Davin Elias Lindholm (26.37); Laura Lahtinen (25.48); Fanny Teijonsalo (24.21)	1:40.15	
19	5	3	Hungary	Ádám Jászó (23.91); Olivér Gál (27.12); Lora Komoróczy (25.32); Petra Senánszky (24.04)	1:40.39	
20	4	7	South Africa	Jessica Thompson (27.16); Michael Houlie (25.67); Caitlin de Lange (26.40); Kris Mihaylov (22.09)	1:41.32	AF
21	3	8	Hong Kong	Hayden Kwan (24.00); Man Wui Kiu (31.25); Tam Hoi Lam (25.73); Ian Yentou Ho (20.52)	1:41.50	NR
22	5	6	Slovakia	Martin Perečinský (24.97); Andrea Podmaníková (30.59); Tamara Potocká (25.09); Matej Duša (21.15)	1:41.80	NR
23	6	8	Kazakhstan	Xeniya Ignatova (27.84); Adelaida Pchelintseva (30.22); Adilbek Mussin (22.56); Gleb Kovalenya (21.58)	1:42.20	
24	4	8	Iceland	Guðmundur Leó Rafnsson (24.90); Snorri Dagur Einarsson (27.11); Jóhanna Elín Guðmundsdóttir (27.03); Vala Dís Cicero (25.02)	1:44.06	
25	2	3	Thailand	Saovanee Boonamphai (28.37); Jenjira Srisa-Ard (30.03); Surasit Thongdeang (24.16); Pongpanod Trithan (22.61)	1:45.17	NR
26	5	2	Dominican Republic	Elizabeth Jiménez (28.41); Josué Domínguez (26.79); Javier Núñez (23.85); Darielys Ortiz (26.53)	1:45.58	
27	2	8	Philippines	Metin Junior Jason Mahmutoglu (24.56); Xiandi Chua (32.92); Chloe Isleta (26.48); Adrian Eichler (22.6)	1:46.56	NR
28	2	6	Namibia	Jessica Humphrey (28.5); Ronan Wantenaar (26.27); Oliver Durand (24.77); Molina Smalley (27.09)	1:46.63	NR
29	5	1	Kenya	Imara Bella Patricia Thorpe (28.96) NR; Haniel Kudwoli (28.77); Stephen Nyoike (24.94); Sara Mose (24.96)	1:47.63	NR
30	6	6	Uganda	Tendo Kaumi (27.4); Tendo Mukalazi (28.48); Kirabo Namutebi (28.94); Gloria Anna Muzito (24.41)	1:49.23	NR
31	1	5	Kyrgyzstan	Elizaveta Pecherskikh (28.59) NR; Denis Petrashov (26.8); Daniil Mistriukov (26.71); Aiymkyz Aidaralieva (27.54)	1:49.64	
32	6	2	Albania	Grisi Koxhaku (25.95); Stella Gjoka (32.86); Kaltra Meca (28.81); Reidi Resuli (22.47)	1:50.09	
33	1	2	Jamaica	Leanna Wainwright (29.05); Sidrell Williams (30.69); Jessica Calderbank (27.4); Nathaniel Thomas (23.03)	1:50.17	
34	2	7	Moldova	Chirill Chirsanov (26.05); Constantin Malachi (27.60); Anastasia Basisto (28.75); Natalia Zaiteva (28.31)	1:50.71	
35	3	4	Samoa	Kaiya Brown (31.89); Kokoro Frost (30.50); Paige Schendelaar-Kemp (27.35); Hector Langkilde (22.38)	1:52.12	
36	3	1	North Korea	Kim Sol-song (31.55); Kim Won-ju (29.83); Kim Ryong-hyon (25.48); Pak Mi-song (25.49)	1:52.35	
37	3	3	Madagascar	Idealy Tendrinavalona (30.28); Jonathan Raharvel (28.01); Baritiana Andriampenomanana (28.16); Antsa Rabejaona (26.23)	1:52.68	NR
38	6	1	Jordan	Adnan Al-Abdallat (28.52); Amro Al-Wir (27.58); Tara Al-Oul (28.96); Karin Belbeisi (28.37)	1:53.43	NR
39	1	3	Northern Mariana Islands	Piper Raho (31.06); Kouki Cerezo Watanabe (30.08); Taiyo Akimaru (26.07); Maria Corazon Ayson Batallones (28.05)	1:55.26	
	1	6	Maldives	Mohamed Rihan Shiham (29.02); Hamna Ahmed; Meral Ayn Latheef; Mohamed Aan Hussain	Disqualified	
	4	2	Peru	Joaquín Vargas (25.64); Anthony Puertas (28.96); Alexia Sotomayor (27.14); Rafaela Fernandini	Disqualified	
	2	5	Cape Verde		Did not start	
	3	7	Bahamas		Did not start	
	4	6	Mongolia		Did not start	

=== Final ===
The final was held at 19:06.

Rank	Lane	Nation	Swimmers	Time	Notes
1st place, gold medalist(s)	7	Neutral Athletes B	Miron Lifintsev (22.39); Kirill Prigoda (24.94); Arina Surkova (24.43); Daria Trofimova (23.60)	1:35.36	ER
2nd place, silver medalist(s)	4	Canada	Kylie Masse (25.87); Finlay Knox (25.53); Ilya Kharun (20.73); Ingrid Wilm (23.81)	1:35.94	
3rd place, bronze medalist(s)	3	United States	Shaine Casas (22.85); Michael Andrew (25.29); Regan Smith (24.90); Katharine Berkoff (23.16)	1:36.20	
4	6	Australia	Isaac Cooper (22.68); Joshua Yong (25.87); Alexandria Perkins (24.61); Meg Harris (23.62)	1:36.78	OC
5	1	Italy	Lorenzo Mora (22.85); Simone Cerasuolo (25.75); Silvia Di Pietro (25.04); Sara Curtis (23.16)	1:36.80	
6	5	Sweden	Louise Hansson (26.07); Daniel Kertes (25.48); Sara Junevik (24.49); Elias Persson (21.01)	1:37.05	NR
7	2	Japan	Kaiya Seki (23.04); Taku Taniguchi (25.21); Mizuki Hirai (25.07); Yume Jinno (23.97)	1:37.29	AS
8	8	Netherlands	Maaike de Waard (26.38); Caspar Corbeau (25.51); Tessa Giele (25.13); Nyls Korstanje (20.45)	1:37.47	
