= Swimming at the 2025 SEA Games =

- Venue: Aquatic Center, Huamark Sports Complex
- Location: Bangkok, Thailand
- Date: 10–15 December 2025
- Competitors: 150 from 11 nations

The swimming competitions at the 2025 SEA Games took place in Bangkok, Thailand from 10 to 15 December 2025.

== Summary ==
Despite stronger competition, Singapore continued its record run as Southeast Asia's leading swimming nation. The team won a total of 34 medals, comprising 19 gold, 8 silver and 7 bronze, with its gold tally exceeding that of the nearest country by more than threefold.

== Participating nations ==
10 nations competed in swimming.

- Brunei (4)
- Indonesia (22)
- Laos (10)
- Malaysia (23)
- Myanmar (8)
- Philippines (11)
- Singapore (21)
- Thailand (26)
- Timor-Leste (2)
- Vietnam (16)

== Medal table ==
* Host nation (Thailand)

| Rank | Nation | Gold | Silver | Bronze | Total |
|---|---|---|---|---|---|
| 1 | Singapore | 19 | 8 | 7 | 34 |
| 2 | Vietnam | 6 | 9 | 10 | 25 |
| 3 | Thailand* | 5 | 7 | 9 | 21 |
| 4 | Philippines | 3 | 9 | 2 | 14 |
| 5 | Indonesia | 3 | 3 | 5 | 11 |
| 6 | Malaysia | 2 | 3 | 5 | 10 |
| Totals (6 entries) | | 38 | 39 | 38 | 115 |

== Medalists ==
Key
| AS | Asian record | GR | SEA Games record | NR | National record |

=== Men ===
| Event | Gold | | Silver | | Bronze | |
|---|---|---|---|---|---|---|
| 50 m freestyle | Mikkel Lee; Singapore | 21.92 | Teong Tzen Wei; Singapore | 22.42 | Yu Jing Tong; Malaysia | 22.48 NR |
| 100 m freestyle | Mikkel Lee; Singapore | 48.65 | Quah Zheng Wen; Singapore | 49.45 | Trần Văn Nguyễn Quốc; Vietnam | 50.02 |
| 200 m freestyle | Khiew Hoe Yean; Malaysia | 1:48.64 | Trần Văn Nguyễn Quốc; Vietnam | 1:48.70 | Arvin Shaun Singh Chahal; Malaysia | 1:50.43 |
| 400 m freestyle | Khiew Hoe Yean; Malaysia | 3:50.63 | Trần Văn Nguyễn Quốc; Vietnam | 3:53.18 | Nguyễn Huy Hoàng; Vietnam | 3:53.50 |
| 1500 m freestyle | Nguyễn Huy Hoàng; Vietnam | 15:19.58 | Mai Trần Tuấn Anh; Vietnam | 15:22.59 | Russell Pang; Singapore | 15:28.46 NR |
| 50 m backstroke | Jason Donovan Yusuf; Indonesia | 25.36 | Quah Zheng Wen; Singapore | 25.43 | I Gede Siman Sudartawa; Indonesia | 25.49 |
| 100 m backstroke | Jason Donovan Yusuf; Indonesia | 55.08 | Farrel Armandio Tangkas; Indonesia | 55.89 | Quah Zheng Wen; Singapore | 56.04 |
| 200 m backstroke | Quah Zheng Wen; Singapore | 2:00.62 | Farrel Armandio Tangkas; Indonesia | 2:01.63 | Tonnam Kanteemool; Thailand | 2:02.89 |
| 50 m breaststroke | Chan Chun Ho; Singapore | 27.68 NR | Andrew Zheng Yen Goh; Malaysia | 27.96 | Felix Viktor Iberle; Indonesia | 28.02 |
| 100 m breaststroke | Phạm Thanh Bảo; Vietnam | 1:01.43 | Chan Chun Ho; Singapore | 1:01.72 | Maximillian Ang Wei; Singapore | 1:02.35 |
| 200 m breaststroke | Phạm Thanh Bảo; Vietnam | 2:12.81 | Chan Chun Ho; Singapore | 2:14.82 | Maximillian Ang Wei; Singapore | 2:15.56 |
| 50 m butterfly | Teong Tzen Wei; Singapore | 23.24 | Quah Zheng Wen; Singapore | 23.57 | Logan Wataru Noguchi; Philippines | 23.97 |
| 100 m butterfly | Quah Zheng Wen; Singapore | 52.25 | Joe Aditya Wijaya Kurniawan; Indonesia | 53.14 | Surasit Thongdeang; Thailand | 53.32 |
| 200 m butterfly | Surasit Thongdeang; Thailand | 1:59.64 | Duong Van Hoang Quy; Vietnam | 2:01.57 | Nguyễn Quang Thuấn; Vietnam | 2:02.60 |
| 200 m individual medley | Trần Hưng Nguyên; Vietnam | 2:02.11 | Gian Christoper Santos; Philippines | 2:03.88 | Nguyễn Quang Thuấn; Vietnam | 2:04.19 |
| 400 m individual medley | Nguyễn Quang Thuấn; Vietnam | 4:19.98 | Trần Hưng Nguyên; Vietnam | 4:25.45 | Tan Khai Xin; Malaysia | 4:25.98 |
| 4 × 100 m freestyle relay | Singapore; Quah Zheng Wen; Mikkel Lee; Jonathan Tan Eu Jin; Zulhilmi Mohd Azman | 3:16.65 GR | Vietnam; Trần Văn Nguyễn Quốc; Luong Jérémie Loïc Nino; Trần Hưng Nguyên; Nguyễn Viết Tường | 3:20.01 NR | Malaysia; Yin Chuen Lim; Khiew Hoe Yean; Arvin Shaun Singh Chahal; Terence Ng Shin Jian | 3:20.87 |
| 4 × 200 m freestyle relay | Vietnam; Trần Văn Nguyễn Quốc; Nguyễn Huy Hoàng; Nguyễn Viết Tường; Trần Hưng Nguyên | 7:18.67 | Malaysia; Khiew Hoe Yean; Arvin Shaun Singh Chahal; Terence Ng Shin Jian; Mohd Dhuha Zulfikry | 7:19.50 NR | Singapore; Quah Zheng Wen; Glen Lim Jun Wei; Jonathan Tan Eu Jin; Zulhilmi Mohd Azman | 7:21.13 |
| 4 × 100 m medley relay | Singapore; Chan Chun Ho; Quah Zheng Wen; Mikkel Lee; Jonathan Tan Eu Jin | 3:38.47 | Thailand; Surasit Thongdeang; Thanonchai Janruksa; Pongpanod Trithan; Tonnam Kamteemool | 3:40.28 NR | Vietnam; Luong Jérémie Loïc Nino; Nguyễn Viết Tường; Trần Hưng Nguyên; Phạm Thanh Bảo | 3:41.34 |

=== Women ===
| Event | Gold | | Silver | | Bronze | |
|---|---|---|---|---|---|---|
| 50 m freestyle | Amanda Lim; Singapore | 25.03 GR | Kayla Sanchez; Philippines | 25.15 NR | Heather White; Philippines | 25.38 |
| 100 m freestyle | Kayla Sanchez; Philippines | 54.82 | Heather White; Philippines | 55.36 | Quah Ting Wen; Singapore | 55.60 |
| 200 m freestyle | Gan Ching Hwee; Singapore | 2:00.02 | Kayla Sanchez; Philippines | 2:02.19 | Maria Nedelko; Thailand | 2:02.71 |
| 400 m freestyle | Gan Ching Hwee; Singapore | 4:11.88 | Kamonchanok Kwanmuang; Thailand | 4:13.56 | Võ Thị Mỹ Tiên; Vietnam | 4:17.39 |
| 800 m freestyle | Gan Ching Hwee; Singapore | 8:33.13 GR | Võ Thị Mỹ Tiên; Vietnam | 8:42.09 | Kamonchanok Kwanmuang; Thailand | 8:52.17 |
| 50 m backstroke | Masniari Wolf; Indonesia | 28.80 NR | Kayla Sanchez; Philippines | 28.84 | | |
| 50 m backstroke | Masniari Wolf; Indonesia | 28.80 NR | Saovanne Boonamphai; Thailand | 28.84 NR | | |
| 100 m backstroke | Kayla Sanchez; Philippines | 1:02.35 | Mia Millar; Thailand | 1:02.52 NR | Flairene Candrea; Indonesia | 1:02.60 |
| 200 m backstroke | Mia Millar; Thailand | 2:13.95 NR | Xiandi Chua; Philippines | 2:15.73 | Adelia Chantika Aulia; Indonesia | 2:16.39 |
| 50 m breaststroke | Letitia Sim; Singapore | 31.03 GR | Jenjira Srisa-ard; Thailand | 31.52 | Phee Jinq En; Malaysia | 31.71 |
| 50 m breaststroke | Letitia Sim; Singapore | 31.03 GR | Jenjira Srisa-ard; Thailand | 31.52 | Saovanee Boonamphai; Thailand | 31.71 |
| 100 m breaststroke | Letitia Sim; Singapore | 1:06.79 GR | Phee Jinq En; Malaysia | 1:10.09 | Nguyễn Thúy Hiền; Vietnam | 1:10.40 NR |
| 200 m breaststroke | Letitia Sim; Singapore | 2:27.37 GR | Pimchanok Chinverraphan; Thailand | 2:31.50 | Adellia; Indonesia | 2:32.50 |
| 50 m butterfly | Quah Ting Wen; Singapore | 26.42 GR | Miranda Cristina Renner; Philippines | 26.93 NR | Jenjira Srisa-ard; Thailand | 26.96 |
| 100 m butterfly | Quah Ting Wen; Singapore | 59.76 | Quah Jing Wen; Singapore | 59.77 | Napatsawan Jaritkla; Thailand | 1:01.57 |
| 200 m butterfly | Kamonchanok Kwanmuang; Thailand | 2:11.78 | Võ Thị Mỹ Tiên; Vietnam | 2:12.10 | Quah Jing Wen; Singapore | 2:13.88 |
| 200 m individual medley | Letitia Sim; Singapore | 2:13.42 GR, NR | Kamonchanok Kwanmuang; Thailand | 2:16.14 | Võ Thị Mỹ Tiên; Vietnam | 2:16.66 |
| 400 m individual medley | Kamonchanok Kwanmuang; Thailand | 4:46.30 | Võ Thị Mỹ Tiên; Vietnam | 4:47.39 | Jinjutha Pholjamjumrus; Thailand | 4:47.62 |
| 4 × 100 m freestyle relay | Philippines; Heather White; Chloe Isleta; Xiandi Chua; Kayla Sanchez | 3:44.26 NR | Singapore; Quah Jing Wen; Ashley Lim Yi Xuan; Quah Ting Wen; Gan Ching Hwee | 3:46.53 | Vietnam; Nguyễn Kha Nhi; Võ Thị Mỹ Tiên; Nguyễn Thúy Hiền; Phạm Thị Vân | 3:47.47 NR |
| 4 × 200 m freestyle relay | Thailand; Maria Nedelko; Jinjutha Pholjamjumrus; Napatsawan Jaritkla; Kamonchanok Kwanmuang | 8:10.10 NR | Philippines; Heather White; Chloe Isleta; Kayla Sanchez; Xiandi Chua | 8:11.55 NR | Vietnam; Nguyễn Kha Nhi; Võ Thị Mỹ Tiên; Nguyễn Thúy Hiền; Phạm Thị Vân | 8:14.22 NR |
| 4 × 100 m medley relay | Singapore; Julia Yeo; Letitia Sim; Quah Jing Wen; Quah Ting Wen | 4:05.79 GR | Philippines; Xiandi Chua; Miranda Cristina Renner; Heather White; Kayla Sanchez | 4:09.33 NR | Thailand; Mia Millar; Napatsawan Jaritkla; Thitirat Inchai; Kamonchanok Kwanmuang | 4:11.55 NR |
