= Swimming at the 2025 SEA Games – Women's 4 × 100 metre medley relay =

Women's 4x100 metre medley relay at the 2025 SEA Games
- Venue: SAT Swimming Pool
- Date: 15 December
- Competitors: 6 from 6 nations
- Winning time: 4:05.79

Medalists
gold medal	Julia Yeo Shu Ning, Letitia Sim, Quah Jing Wen, Quah Ting Wen	Singapore
silver medal	Xiandi Chua, Miranda Cristina Renner, Heather White, Kayla Sanchez	Philippines
bronze medal	Mia Millar, Thitirat Inchai, Napatsawan Jaritkla, Maria Nedelko	Thailand

The women's 4 × 100 metre medley relay event at the 2025 SEA Games took place on 15 December 2025 at the SAT Swimming Pool in Bangkok, Thailand.

== Schedule ==
All times are Indochina Standard Time (UTC+07:00)

Date	Time	Event
Wednesday, 15 December 2025	19:39	Final

== Records ==
Prior to this competition, the existing world, Asian, and Southeast Asian Games records were as follows.

World Record	United States; Regan Smith (57.57); Kate Douglass (1:04.27); Gretchen Walsh (54.98); Torri Huske (52.52)	3:49.34	Singapore, Singapore	3 August 2025
Asian Record	China; Zhao Jing (58.98); Chen Huijia (1:04.12); Jiao Liuyang (56.28); Li Zhesi (52.81)	3:52.19	Rome, Italy	1 August 2009
Games Record	Singapore; Faith Khoo (1:04.23); Letitia Sim (1:07.32); Quah Jing Wen (59.10); Quah Ting Wen (56.32)	4:06.97	Phnom Penh, Cambodia	11 May 2023

== Results ==
=== Final ===
Rank	Lane	Swimmer	Nationality	Time	Notes
1st place, gold medalist(s)	4	Julia Yeo Shu Ning (1:04.79); Letitia Sim (1:05.92); Quah Jing Wen (56.92); Quah Ting Wen (55.15)	Singapore	4:05.79	GR
2nd place, silver medalist(s)	3	Xiandi Chua (1:03.69); Miranda Cristina Renner (1:11.37); Heather White (1:00.46); Kayla Sanchez (53.81)	Philippines	4:09.33	NR
3rd place, bronze medalist(s)	5	Mia Millar (1:02.74); Thitirat Inchai (1:10.41); Napatsawan Jaritkla (1:01.08); Maria Nedelko (57.32)	Thailand	4:11.55	NR
4	6	Chong Xin Lin (1:03.62) NR; Phee Jinq En (1:09.36); Lim Shun Qi (1:00.97); Wong Shi Qi (58.86)	Malaysia	4:12.81	NR
5	2	Flairene Candrea (1:03.20); Adellia (1:11.31); Michelle Surjadi Fang (1:01.79); Adelia Chantika Aulia (56.72)	Indonesia	4:13.02	
6	7	Phạm Thị Vân (1:07.11); Nguyễn Thúy Hiền (1:11.91); Võ Thị Mỹ Tiên (1:02.17); Nguyễn Kha Nhi (58.45)	Vietnam	4:19.64	
