= List of Philippine records in swimming =

The Filipino records in swimming are the fastest ever performances of swimmers from Philippines, which are recognised and ratified by the Philippine Swimming.

All records were set in finals unless noted otherwise.

== Long Course (50 m) ==
=== Men ===
Event	Time		Name	Club	Date	Meet	Location	Ref
50 m freestyle	22.55		Logan Noguchi	Philippines	11 December 2025	Southeast Asian Games	Bangkok, Thailand	
100 m freestyle	49.64	h	Luke Gebbie	Philippines	27 July 2021	Olympic Games	Tokyo, Japan	
200 m freestyle	1:49.34	h	Gian Santos	Philippines	23 September 2026	Asian Games	Tokyo, Japan	
400 m freestyle	3:55.34		Jessie Lacuna	Philippines	11 June 2015	Southeast Asian Games	Singapore, Singapore	
800 m freestyle	8:17.49	†, h	Ryan Arabejo	Philippines	15 August 2008	Olympic Games	Beijing, China	
1500 m freestyle	15:37.75		Ryan Arabejo	Philippines	13 December 2009	Southeast Asian Games	Vientiane, Laos	
50 m backstroke	25.56		Jerard Jacinto	Philippines	7 May 2023	Southeast Asian Games	Phnom Penh, Cambodia	
100 m backstroke	55.83	r	Jerard Jacinto	Philippines	8 May 2023	Southeast Asian Games	Phnom Penh, Cambodia	
200 m backstroke	2:00.96		Raymond Papa	Philippines	14 October 1997	Southeast Asian Games	Jakarta, Indonesia	
50 m breaststroke	27.91	h	James Deiparine	Philippines	23 July 2019	World Championships	Gwangju, South Korea	
100 m breaststroke	1:01.46		James Deiparine	Philippines	4 December 2019	Southeast Asian Games	Capas, Philippines	
200 m breaststroke	2:14.21	h	Miguel Molina	Philippines	16 April 2009	Japan Championships	Hamamatsu, Japan	
50 m butterfly	23.89		Jarod Hatch	Philippines	10 May 2023	Southeast Asian Games	Phnom Penh, Cambodia	
100 m butterfly	52.87	h	Jarod Hatch	Suspended Member Federation	28 July 2023	World Championships	Fukuoka, Japan	
200 m butterfly	1:59.39	h	James Walsh	Philippines	11 August 2008	Olympic Games	Beijing, China	
200m individual medley	2:00.54	h	Miguel Molina	Philippines	18 April 2009	Japan Championships	Hamamatsu, Japan	
400m individual medley	4:19.75	h	Miguel Molina	Philippines	17 April 2009	Japan Championships	Hamamatsu, Japan	
4×100m freestyle relay	3:22.32		Luke Gebbie (50.32); Maurice Ilustre (51.12); Jean-pierre Khouzam (50.39); Jarod Hatch (50.49)	Philippines	6 December 2019	Southeast Asian Games	Capas, Philippines	
4×200m freestyle relay	7:30.76		Jessie Lacuna (1:52.21); Charles Walker (1:51.78); Ryan Arabejo (1:55.07); Miguel Molina (1:51.70)	Philippines	15 November 2010	Asian Games	Guangzhou, China	
4×100m medley relay	3:43.85		Jerard Jacinto (55.83); Jonathan Cook (1:03.36); Jarod Hatch (52.66); Rafael Barreto (52.00)	Philippines	8 May 2023	Southeast Asian Games	Phnom Penh, Cambodia	

Legend: # – Record awaiting ratification by Philippine Swimming; WR – World record; AS – Asian record; e – equalled existing record;
Records not set in finals: h – heat; sf – semifinal; r – relay 1st leg; rh – relay heat 1st leg; b – B final; † – en route to final mark; so – swim-off; tt – time trial

=== Women ===
Event	Time		Name	Club	Date	Meet	Location	Ref
50 m freestyle	24.86		Kayla Sanchez	Philippines	15 August 2026	Pan Pacific Championships	Irvine, United States	
100 m freestyle	53.46		Kayla Sanchez	Philippines	13 August 2026	Pan Pacific Championships	Irvine, United States	
200 m freestyle	2:00.35	b	Remedy Rule	Longhorn Aquatic Club	6 March 2020	TYR Pro Swim Series	Des Moines, United States	
400 m freestyle	4:16.32	b	Nicole Oliva	Philippines	11 August 2018	Pan Pacific Championships	Tokyo, Japan	
800 m freestyle	8:48.62		Nicole Oliva	Santa Clara Swimming Club	9 June 2018	TYR Pro Swim Series	Santa Clara, United States	
1500 m freestyle	17:04.66		Nicole Oliva	Santa Clara Swimming Club	12 August 2017	Speedo Junior National Championships	East Meadow, United States	
50 m backstroke	28.19	h	Kayla Sanchez	Philippines	21 September 2026	Asian Games	Tokyo, Japan	
100 m backstroke	1:01.64		Teia Salvino	Philippines	9 May 2023	Southeast Asian Games	Phnom Penh, Cambodia	
200 m backstroke	2:13.20		Xiandi Chua	Philippines	8 May 2023	Southeast Asian Games	Phnom Penh, Cambodia	
50m breaststroke	31.11		Thanya Dela Cruz	Ateneo de Manila University	25 November 2022	UAAP Championships	Manila, Philippines	
100m breaststroke	1:08.64		Thanya Dela Cruz	Ateneo de Manila University	26 November 2022	UAAP Championships	Manila, Philippines	
200m breaststroke	2:30.42		Thanya Dela Cruz	Ateneo de Manila University	27 November 2022	UAAP Championships	Manila, Philippines	
50m butterfly	26.93		Miranda Renner	Philippines	15 December 2025	Southeast Asian Games	Bangkok, Thailand	
100m butterfly	59.55		Remedy Rule	Longhorn Aquatic Club	20 May 2021	Longhorn Elite Invite	Austin, United States	
200m butterfly	2:09.58		Remedy Rule	Longhorn Aquatic Club	5 March 2020	TYR Pro Swim Series	Des Moines, United States	
200m individual medley	2:16.02		Xiandi Chua	Philippines	21 September 2026	Asian Games	Tokyo, Japan	
400m individual medley	4:46.81		Xiandi Chua	Philippines	18 April 2023	Australian Championships	Gold Coast, Australia	
4×100m freestyle relay	3:44.26		Heather White (56.08); Chloe Isleta (58.02); Xiandi Chua (56.37); Kayla Sanchez (53.79)	Philippines	10 December 2025	Southeast Asian Games	Bangkok, Thailand	
4×200m freestyle relay	8:11.55		Heather White (2:02.95); Chloe Isleta (2:04.61); Kayla Sanchez (1:59.86); Xiandi Chua (2:04.13)	Philippines	14 December 2025	Southeast Asian Games	Bangkok, Thailand	
4×100m medley relay	4:09.33		Xiandi Chua (1:03.69); Miranda Renner (1:11.37); Heather White (1:00.46); Kayla Sanchez (53.81)	Philippines	15 December 2025	Southeast Asian Games	Bangkok, Thailand	

Legend: # – Record awaiting ratification by Philippine Swimming; WR – World record; AS – Asian record; e – equalled existing record;
Records not set in finals: h – heat; sf – semifinal; r – relay 1st leg; rh – relay heat 1st leg; b – B final; † – en route to final mark; so – swim-off; tt – time trial

=== Mixed relay ===
Event	Time		Name	Club	Date	Meet	Location	Ref
4×100 m freestyle relay	3:36.53	h	Jarod Hatch (51.65); Kayla Sanchez (55.08); Teia Salvino (57.21); Jerard Jacinto (52.59)	Philippines	17 February 2024	World Championships	Doha, Qatar	
4×100 m medley relay	3:53.91	h	Jerard Jacinto (57.38); Thanya Dela Cruz (1:08.87); Jarod Hatch (53.35); Kayla Sanchez (54.31)	Philippines	14 February 2024	World Championships	Doha, Qatar	

Legend: # – Record awaiting ratification by Philippine Swimming; WR – World record; AS – Asian record; e – equalled existing record;
Records not set in finals: h – heat; so – swim-off

== Short Course (25 m) ==
=== Men ===
Event	Time		Name	Club	Date	Meet	Location	Ref
50 m freestyle	22.19		Jason Mahmutoglu	Chelsea & Westminster	23 October 2023	Chelsea & Westminster + Millfield International Open	Glastonbury, United Kingdom	
100 m freestyle	48.84		Luke Gebbie	Melbourne Vicentre	24 October 2019	Australian Championships	Melbourne, Australia	
200 m freestyle	1:48.02		Miguel Molina	-	25 March 2004	NCAA Championships	East Meadow, United States	
400 m freestyle	3:51.62	h	Adrian Eichler	Philippines	12 December 2024	World Championships	Budapest, Hungary	
800 m freestyle	8:22.86	†	Fahad Alkhaldi	Philippines	7 December 2014	World Championships	Doha, Qatar	
1500 m freestyle	16:03.72		Fahad Alkhaldi	Philippines	7 December 2014	World Championships	Doha, Qatar	
50 m backstroke	24.29	h	Jason Mahmutoglu	Philippines	12 December 2024	World Championships	Budapest, Hungary	
100 m backstroke	53.69	h	Jerard Jacinto	Philippines	16 December 2021	World Championships	Abu Dhabi, United Arab Emirates	
200 m backstroke								
50 m breaststroke	27.56	h	Rian Tirol	Philippines	1 November 2024	World Cup	Singapore, Singapore	
100 m breaststroke	1:00.68	h	Joshua Hall	Philippines	3 December 2014	World Championships	Doha, Qatar	
200 m breaststroke	2:09.40	h	Jonathan Cook	Philippines	18 December 2021	World Championships	Abu Dhabi, United Arab Emirates	
50 m butterfly	23.84	h	Jason Mahmutoglu	Philippines	10 December 2024	World Championships	Budapest, Hungary	
100 m butterfly	53.44		Joshua Ang	Golden Sea Eagles	21 August 2024	Philippine National Trials	New Clark City, Philippines	
200 m butterfly	1:58.22	b	Robin Domingo	McGill University	14 March 2026	U SPORTS Championships	Markham, Canada	
100 m individual medley	55.05	h	Miguel Molina	Philippines	21 February 2009	Japan Open	Tokyo, Japan	
200 m individual medley	1:57.29		Miguel Molina	Philippines	22 February 2009	Japan Open	Tokyo, Japan	
400 m individual medley	4:11.64	h	Miguel Molina	Philippines	21 February 2009	Japan Open	Tokyo, Japan	
4×50 m freestyle relay	1:33.12		Jeremy Bryan Lim (23.75); Dhill Anderson Lee (23.28); Fahad Alkhaldi (23.07); Jessie Khing Lacuna (23.02)	Philippines	6 December 2014	World Championships	Doha, Qatar	
4×100 m freestyle relay	3:25.76	h	Axel Toni Steven Ngui (51.57); Jethro Roberts Chua (50.99); Fahad Alkhaldi (52.19); Jessie Khing Lacuna (51.01)	Philippines	3 December 2014	World Championships	Doha, Qatar	
4×200 m freestyle relay	7:25.46	h	Fahad Alkhaldi (1:48.86); Axel Toni Steven Ngui (1:52.90); Jethro Roberts Chua (1:53.31); Jessie Lacuna (1:50.39)	Philippines	4 December 2014	World Championships	Doha, Qatar	
4×50 m medley relay	1:42.64	h	Fahad Alkhaldi (27.32); Joshua Hall (27.75); Dhill Anderson Lee (23.90); Axel Toni Steven Ngui (23.67)	Philippines	4 December 2014	World Championships	Doha, Qatar	
4×100 m medley relay	3:45.90	h	Axel Toni Steven Ngui (58.53); Joshua Hall (1:00.98); Dhill Anderson Lee (53.74); Jeremy Bryan Lim (52.65)	Philippines	7 December 2014	World Championships	Doha, Qatar	

Legend: # – Record awaiting ratification by Philippine Swimming; WR – World record; AS – Asian record; e – equalled existing record;
Records not set in finals: h – heat; sf – semifinal; r – relay 1st leg; rh – relay heat 1st leg; b – B final; † – en route to final mark; so – swim-off; tt – time trial

=== Women ===
Event	Time		Name	Club	Date	Meet	Location	Ref
50 m freestyle	23.90		Kayla Sanchez	Ubc Thunderbirds	29 November 2025	Canada West Championships	Lethbridge, Canada	
100 m freestyle	51.74		Kayla Sanchez	Ubc Thunderbirds	24 November 2024	Canada West Championships	Vancouver, Canada	
200 m freestyle	1:53.63		Kayla Sanchez	University of British Columbia	12 March 2026	U SPORTS Championships	Markham, Canada	
400 m freestyle	4:13.27		Kayla Sanchez	Ubc Thunderbirds	26 October 2024	UofC Dino Invitational	Calgary, Canada	
800 m freestyle	9:01.90	h	Rosalee Santa Ana	Philippines	12 December 2018	World Championships	Hangzhou, China	
1500 m freestyle								
50m backstroke	25.98		Kayla Sanchez	Ubc Thunderbirds	28 November 2025	Canada West Championships	Lethbridge, Canada	
100m backstroke	58.31		Kayla Sanchez	Ubc Thunderbirds	8 February 2025	West Coast Collegiate	Victoria, Canada	
200m backstroke	2:08.19		Xiandi Chua	Philippines	14 September 2023	Australian Championships	Sydney, Australia	
50m breaststroke	31.19	h	Thanya Dela Cruz	Philippines	17 December 2022	World Championships	Melbourne, Australia	
100m breaststroke	1:07.17	h	Thanya Dela Cruz	Philippines	14 December 2022	World Championships	Melbourne, Australia	
200m breaststroke	2:34.58	b	Xiandi Chua	Philippines	1 October 2025	Australian Championships	Adelaide, Australia	
50m butterfly	25.85		Kayla Sanchez	Ubc Thunderbirds	7 March 2025	U Sports Championships	Toronto, Canada	
100m butterfly	57.95		Remedy Rule	DC Trident	16 November 2019	International Swimming League	College Park, United States	
200m butterfly	2:05.38		Remedy Rule	DC Trident	17 November 2019	International Swimming League	College Park, United States	
100m individual medley	58.67	h	Kayla Sanchez	University Of British Columbia	7 November 2026	National Bank University Cup Pacific	Vancouver, Canada	
200m individual medley	2:09.75		Kayla Sanchez	Ubc Thunderbirds	24 November 2024	Canada West Championships	Vancouver, Canada	
400m individual medley	4:43.19		Xiandi Chua	Philippines	2 October 2025	Australian Championships	Adelaide, Australia	
4×50m freestyle relay								
4×100m freestyle relay								
4×200m freestyle relay								
4×50m medley relay								
4×100m medley relay								

Legend: # – Record awaiting ratification by Philippine Swimming; WR – World record; AS – Asian record; e – equalled existing record;
Records not set in finals: h – heat; sf – semifinal; r – relay 1st leg; rh – relay heat 1st leg; b – B final; † – en route to final mark; so – swim-off; tt – time trial

=== Mixed relay ===
Event	Time		Name	Club	Date	Meet	Location	Ref
4×50 m freestyle relay	1:41.46	h	Jessie Lacuna (23.64); Anna Celina Gonzalez (26.99); Hanna Dato (26.04); Jethro Robert Chua (24.79)	Philippines	6 November 2013	World Cup	Singapore, Singapore	
4×50 m medley relay	1:46.56	h	Jason Mahmutoglu (24.56); Xiandi Chua (32.92); Chloe Isleta (26.48); Adrian Eichler (22.60)	Philippines	11 December 2024	World Championships	Budapest, Hungary	

Legend: # – Record awaiting ratification by Philippine Swimming; WR – World record; AS – Asian record; e – equalled existing record;
Records not set in finals: h – heat; so – swim-off
