= Mikkel Lee =

Singaporean swimmer (born 2002)

Personal information
- Full name: Mikkel Lee Jun Jie
- Born: 12 December 2002 (age 23) Singapore

Sport
- Sport: Swimming
- Strokes: Freestyle, Butterfly
- College team: Indiana University Bloomington
Medal record
Men's swimming
Event	1st	2nd	3rd
Southeast Asian Games	6	1	0
Total	6	1	0
Southeast Asian Games
Gold medal – first place	2023 Cambodia	50 m butterfly
Gold medal – first place	2023 Cambodia	4×100 m freestyle
Gold medal – first place	2025 Thailand	50 m freestyle
Gold medal – first place	2025 Thailand	100 m freestyle
Gold medal – first place	2025 Thailand	4×100 m freestyle
Gold medal – first place	2025 Thailand	4×100 m medley
Silver medal – second place	2021 Vietnam	50 m butterfly

Mikkel Lee Jun Jie (born 12 December 2002) is a Singaporean swimmer who specialises in freestyle and butterfly events. He is also the national record holder in the men's 100m freestyle for the short course event.

== Education ==
Mikkel is currently studying at the Indiana University Bloomington. Lee was a former student of Anglo-Chinese School (Independent), winning numerous medals for the school, where he also obtained his International Baccalaureate Diploma.

== Career ==
Mikkel made his competitive debut at the 2021 SEA Games in Vietnam, clinching a silver medal behind Teong Tzen Wei. Mikkel won his first gold medal at the 2023 SEA Games in Cambodia after beating Tzen Wei at the 50m butterfly. He also won the 4 × 100 m freestyle relay.

On 18 October 2025, Mikkel set the national record for the fastest 100m freestyle in the short course (25m) at the 2025 World Aquatics Swimming World Cup held in Westmont, United States.

At the 2025 SEA Games, Mikkel obtained four gold medals at the 50m and 100m freestyle, 4 × 100 m freestyle and medley relays.
