= UAAP Season 85 =

University athletics in the Philippines

- "Rise as One"
- Host school: Adamson University

Overall
- Seniors: University of Santo Tomas
- Juniors: University of Santo Tomas

Collegiate champions
Sport		Men	Women
Basketball		Ateneo	NU
Volleyball		NU	La Salle
Beach volleyball		UST	UST
Football		FEU	FEU
Baseball		La Salle	NT
Softball		NT	Adamson
Fencing		UE	UE
Swimming		Ateneo	La Salle
Badminton		NU	Ateneo
Chess		UST	NU
Judo		UST	UE
Table tennis		UST	La Salle
Tennis		UST	NU
Athletics		UP	UST
Taekwondo		NU	UST
3x3 basketball		La Salle	UST
- Poomsae: NU (Coed)
- Cheerdance: NU (Ex - Coed)
- Street dance: UST (Ex - Coed)
- Ballroom: UP (Ex - Coed)

High School champions
Sport		Boys	Girls
Basketball		FEU	NT
Volleyball		FEU	NU
Beach volleyball		FEU	UST
Football		FEU	NT
Fencing		UE	UE
Swimming		UST	UST
Chess		FEU	FEU
Judo		UST	UST
Table tennis		La Salle	UST
Athletics		Adamson	UST
Taekwondo		UST	NT
3x3 basketball		FEU	NU
- (NT) = No tournament; (DS) = Demonstration Sport; (Ex) = Exhibition;

UAAP Season 85 was the 2022–23 athletic year of the University Athletic Association of the Philippines (UAAP). Season 85 theme is "Rise as One", and the season host was the Adamson University. With just seven events in Season 84, the collegiate league will be bringing back the full athletic calendar of events for Season 85.

The year 2022 will thus hold two UAAP seasons. UAAP Season 84 was held starting March 26, 2022, and Season 85 started on October 1, 2022. Opening ceremony was a pre-recorded one that commenced at 1:00 pm (PHT) on UAAP Varsity Channel.

== Sports calendar ==
This is the calendar of sports events of UAAP Season 85. The list includes the tournament host schools and the venues.

=== First Semester ===
Sport (Division)	Event Host	Duration	Venue/s
Basketball (Collegiate)	Adamson University	Oct 1 – Dec 19, 2022	SM Mall of Asia Arena; PhilSports Arena; Smart Araneta Coliseum; UST Quadricentennial Pavilion; Ynares Center
Badminton (Collegiate)	National University	Oct 29 – Nov 13, 2022	Centro Atletico Badminton Center
Chess (Collegiate & High School)	Far Eastern University	Nov 12 – Dec 17, 2022	FEU Diliman Sports Complex; FEU Institute of Technology Gym
Beach Volleyball (Collegiate)	University of the East	Nov 19–29, 2022	Sands at SM by the Bay
Table Tennis (Collegiate & High School)	De La Salle University	Nov 20–26, 2022	Makati Coliseum
Swimming (Collegiate & High School)	University of the Philippines	Nov 24–27, 2022	Teofilo Yldefonso Swimming Pool
Athletics (Collegiate & High School)	University of the Philippines	Nov 30 – Dec 4, 2022	PhilSports Football and Athletics Stadium
Cheerdance (Coed)	Special Events Committee	December 10, 2022	SM Mall of Asia Arena
Taekwondo (Poomsae) (Coed)	Ateneo de Manila University	December 13, 2022	Ateneo Blue Eagle Gym
Taekwondo (Kyorugi) (Collegiate & High School)	Ateneo de Manila University	Dec 13–15, 2022	Ateneo Blue Eagle Gym
Judo (Collegiate & High School)	Ateneo de Manila University	Dec 17–18, 2022	Ateneo Blue Eagle Gym

=== Second Semester ===
Sport	Event host	Duration	Venue(s)
Basketball (High School)	De La Salle University	Jan 15 – March 17, 2023	Filoil EcoOil Centre; San Andres Sports Complex; Paco Arena
Football (Collegiate & High School)	Far Eastern University	Jan 22 – May 21, 2023	UP Diliman Football Pitch
Volleyball (High School)	University of the East	Feb 13 – Mar 21, 2023	Paco Arena
Softball (Collegiate)	University of the Philippines	Feb 18 – March 18, 2023	UP Diliman Baseball/Softball Field
Fencing (Collegiate & High School)	University of Santo Tomas	Feb 23–26, 2023	UST Quadricentennial Pavilion
Volleyball (Collegiate)	Adamson University	Feb 25 –May 14,2023	SM Mall of Asia Arena; PhilSports Arena; Smart Araneta Coliseum; Filoil EcoOil Centre
Lawn Tennis (Collegiate)	National University	March 11 – April 29	Felicisimo Ampon Tennis Court
Baseball (Collegiate)	University of the Philippines	March 12 – April 21, 2023	UP Diliman Baseball/Softball Field
3x3 Basketball (High School)		April 29–30, 2023	Ateneo Blue Eagle Gym
Beach Volleyball (High School)		April 29 – May 7, 2023	Sands at SM by the Bay

== Basketball ==
The tournament started on October 1, 2022, at the SM Mall of Asia Arena and games are scheduled three times a week (every Wednesdays, Saturdays and Sundays). Four basketball games are scheduled every Wednesdays, and two games every Saturdays and Sundays. All teams play in the Wednesday play dates. The reason behind the quick tournament is to give way for the fifth window of the FIBA World Cup 2023 Asian Qualifiers in November. The men's and women's basketball tournaments still follows the same format: A double-round elimination stage, semi-finals (final four), and best-of-three finals.

The Coach's Challenge system implemented in both men's and women's basketball tournaments as part of the innovation this Season 85. This is in accordance with one of the new rules of the world basketball governing body FIBA.

The playing venue of the basketball games were not only held at the SM Mall of Asia Arena in Season 85. Basketball games were played in various venues unlike in Season 84 where the entirety of the basketball tournament was held only in the SM Mall of Asia Arena in a bubble set-up due to the COVID-19 pandemic. The UAAP were expand out of the Mall of Asia Arena and back to other venues for the Season 85 basketball tournament. Apart from SM Mall of Asia Arena, the league returned for games at the Araneta Coliseum in Quezon City, the PhilSports Arena (formerly ULTRA) in Pasig City, and the Ynares Center in Antipolo.

Further pre-pandemic features of this season's basketball tournament also included the return of weekend double-header afternoon schedules, the return of the women's collegiate and boys' high school tournaments, and patron/VIP arena seating for fans.

Kicking off the tournament at MOA on opening day (Saturday, October 1) were the matches between host Adamson and UST at 2 pm (PHT), and La Salle versus defending champion UP at 4 pm (PHT).

Second day (Sunday, October 2) hostilities were the games between UE and NU, which started at 2 pm (PHT) and still at the MOA Arena, followed by the match between Ateneo and FEU at 4 pm (PHT).

=== Men's tournament ===
==== Elimination round ====
Pos	Team	W	L	PCT	GB	Qualification
1	Ateneo Blue Eagles	11	3	.786 (Note: Head to head record: Ateneo 1–1 UP (Ateneo +3))	—	Twice-to-beat in the semifinals
2	UP Fighting Maroons	11	3	.786	—	Twice-to-beat in the semifinals
3	NU Bulldogs	9	5	.643	2	Twice-to-win in the semifinals
4	Adamson Soaring Falcons (H)	7	7	.500 (Note: Fourth seed playoff: Adamson 80–76 La Salle)	4	Twice-to-win in the semifinals
5	De La Salle Green Archers	7	7	.500	4	
6	UE Red Warriors	5	9	.357 (Note: Head to head record: UE 1–1 FEU (UE +3))	6	
7	FEU Tamaraws	5	9	.357	6	
8	UST Growling Tigers	1	13	.071	10	

Source: UAAP on Livestats
Rules for classification: 1) winning percentage; 2) if tied for No. 2 or 4, one-game playoff; 3) head-to-head record; 4) head-to-head point differential; 5) overall point differential
(H) Hosts

==== Playoffs ====
Semifinals (Top 2 twice-to-beat)
1	Ateneo	81
4	Adamson	60
2	UP	69
3	NU	61

Finals (Best-of-three playoff)
1	Ateneo	66	65	75
2	UP	72	55	68

==== Awards ====
- Most Valuable Player: Malick Diouf (UP Fighting Maroons)
- Rookie of the Year: Kevin Quiambao (De La Salle Green Archers)

=== Women's tournament ===
==== Elimination round ====
Pos	Team	W	L	PCT	GB	Qualification
1	NU Lady Bulldogs	13	1	.929	—	Twice-to-beat in the semifinals
2	De La Salle Lady Archers	12	2	.857	1	Twice-to-beat in the semifinals
3	UST Growling Tigresses	11	3	.786	2	Twice-to-win in the semifinals
4	Ateneo Blue Eagles	7	7	.500	6	Twice-to-win in the semifinals
5	UP Fighting Maroons	6	8	.429	7	
6	Adamson Lady Falcons (H)	5	9	.357	8	
7	FEU Lady Tamaraws	2	12	.143	11	
8	UE Lady Warriors	0	14	.000	13	

Source: UAAP on Livestats
Rules for classification: 1) winning percentage; 2) if tied for No. 2 or 4, one-game playoff; 3) head-to-head record; 4) head-to-head point differential; 5) overall point differential
(H) Hosts

==== Playoffs ====
Semifinals (Top 2 twice-to-beat)
1	NU	83
4	Ateneo	64
2	La Salle	57	74
3	UST	68	69

Finals (Best-of-three playoff)
1	NU	93	76
2	La Salle	61	64

==== Awards ====
- Most Valuable Player: Eka Soriano (UST Growling Tigresses)
- Rookie of the Year: Kacey Dela Rosa (Ateneo Blue Eagles)

=== Boys' tournament ===
==== Elimination round ====
Pos	Team	W	L	PCT	GB	Qualification
1	Adamson Baby Falcons	12	2	.857 (Note: Head to head record: Adamson 2–0 FEU Diliman)	—	Twice-to-beat in the semifinals
2	FEU–D Baby Tamaraws	12	2	.857	—	Twice-to-beat in the semifinals
3	NUNS Bullpups	11	3	.786	1	Twice-to-win in the semifinals
4	UST Tiger Cubs	7	7	.500	5	Twice-to-win in the semifinals
5	Ateneo Blue Eagles	5	9	.357	7	
6	Zobel Junior Archers (H)	5	9	.357	7	
7	UE Junior Red Warriors	3	11	.214	9	
8	UPIS Junior Fighting Maroons	1	13	.071	11	

Source: UAAP on Livestats
Rules for classification: 1) winning percentage; 2) if tied for No. 2 or 4, one-game playoff; 3) head-to-head record; 4) head-to-head point differential; 5) overall point differential
(H) Hosts

==== Playoffs ====
Semifinals (Top 2 twice-to-beat)
1	Adamson	62
4	UST	55
2	FEU–D	82	71
3	NSNU	93	65

Finals (Best-of-three playoff)
1	Adamson	74	76
2	FEU–D	85	77

==== Awards ====
- Most Valuable Player: Reinhard Jumamoy (NUNS Bullpups)
- Rookie of the Year: Daryl Valdeavilla (UPIS Junior Fighting Maroons)

== Volleyball ==
The tournament started on February 25, 2023, at the SM Mall of Asia Arena and games are scheduled three times a week (every Wednesdays, Saturdays and Sundays). Four volleyball games are scheduled every Wednesdays, and two games every Saturdays and Sundays. All teams play in the Wednesday play dates. Both collegiate and high school volleyball tournaments still follows the same format: A double-round elimination stage, semi-finals (final four), and best-of-three finals.

The Video Challenge system implemented in both men's and women's volleyball tournaments as part of the innovation this Season 85. This is in accordance with one of the new rules of the world volleyball governing body FIVB. The first time the UAAP implemented the Video Challenge rule was back in 2020, but it did not last as the season got canceled at the onset of the COVID-19 pandemic. And will only be ready to use from second round of the tournament.

The playing venue of the volleyball games were not only held at the SM Mall of Asia Arena in Season 85. Volleyball games were played in various venues unlike in Season 84 where the entirety of the volleyball tournament was held only in the SM Mall of Asia Arena in a closed-circuit set-up due to the COVID-19 pandemic. The UAAP were expand out of the Mall of Asia Arena and back to other venues for the Season 85 basketball tournament. Apart from SM Mall of Asia Arena, the league returned for games at the Araneta Coliseum in Quezon City, the Filoil EcoOil Centre in San Juan City and the PhilSports Arena (formerly ULTRA) in Pasig City.

Further pre-pandemic features of this season's volleyball tournament also included the return of weekend double-header afternoon schedules, the return of the men's collegiate, boys' and girls' high school tournaments, and patron/VIP arena seating for fans.

Kicking off the tournament at MOA on opening day (Saturday, February 25) were the matches between host Adamson and UE at 10 am and 12 pm (PHT), and Ateneo versus defending champion NU at 2 and 4 pm (PHT).

Second day (Sunday, February 26) hostilities were the games between UP and FEU, which started at 10 am and 12 pm (PHT) and still at the MOA Arena, followed by the match between La Salle and UST at 2 and 4 pm (PHT).

=== Men's tournament ===
==== Elimination round ====
Pos	Team	Pld	W	L	Pts	SW	SL	SR	SPW	SPL	SPR	Qualification
1	NU Bulldogs	14	14	0	40	42	9	4.667	1234	1012	1.219	Advance to the finals (Note: As NU won all of their elimination round games, the stepladder format will be used instead of the regular Final Four format.)
2	UST Golden Spikers	14	11	3	32	37	18	2.056	1294	1189	1.088	Proceed to stepladder round 2
3	FEU Tamaraws	14	8	6	27	33	24	1.375	1293	1258	1.028	Proceed to stepladder round 1
4	De La Salle Green Spikers	14	8	6	24	29	22	1.318	1173	1126	1.042	Proceed to stepladder round 1
5	Ateneo Blue Eagles	14	7	7	18	26	30	0.867	1259	1250	1.007	
6	UE Red Warriors	14	5	9	15	24	32	0.750	1207	1253	0.963	
7	Adamson Soaring Falcons (H)	14	2	12	8	13	38	0.342	1026	1213	0.846	
8	UP Fighting Maroons	14	1	13	4	10	41	0.244	1058	1243	0.851	

Source: UAAP on Twitter
Rules for classification: 1) number of wins; 2) if tied for No. 2 or 4, one-game playoff; 3) match points; 4) sets ratio; 5) points ratio; 6) head-to-head record
(H) Host

==== Playoffs ====
Stepladder round 1 (Single elimination)
3	FEU	3
4	La Salle	1

Stepladder round 2 (Single elimination)
2	UST	3
3	FEU	0

Finals (Best-of-three series)
1	NU	3	3
2	UST	2	0

==== Awards ====
- Most Valuable Player: Josh Ybañez (UST Golden Spikers)
- Rookie of the Year: Josh Ybañez (UST Golden Spikers)

=== Women's tournament ===
==== Elimination round ====
Pos	Team	Pld	W	L	Pts	SW	SL	SR	SPW	SPL	SPR	Qualification
1	De La Salle Lady Spikers	14	13	1	37	40	8	5.000	1141	899	1.269	Twice-to-beat in the semifinals
2	NU Lady Bulldogs	14	11	3	32	35	15	2.333	1158	958	1.209	Twice-to-beat in the semifinals
3	Adamson Lady Falcons (H)	14	10	4	32	35	17	2.059	1199	1079	1.111	Twice-to-win in the semifinals
4	UST Golden Tigresses	14	10	4	29	34	20	1.700	1209	1119	1.080	Twice-to-win in the semifinals
5	FEU Lady Tamaraws	14	6	8	16	21	31	0.677	1113	1164	0.956	
6	Ateneo Blue Eagles	14	4	10	14	18	32	0.563	1043	1142	0.913	
7	UP Fighting Maroons	14	1	13	5	10	40	0.250	989	1183	0.836	
8	UE Lady Red Warriors	14	1	13	3	11	41	0.268	942	1250	0.754	

Source: UAAP on Twitter
Rules for classification: 1) number of wins; 2) if tied for No. 2 or 4, one-game playoff; 3) match points; 4) sets ratio; 5) points ratio; 6) head-to-head record
(H) Host

==== Playoffs ====
Semifinals (Nos. 1 & 2 have twice-to-beat advantage)
1	La Salle	3
4	UST	1
2	NU	3
3	Adamson	1

Finals (Best-of-three series)
1	La Salle	3	3
2	NU	2	2

==== Awards ====
- Most Valuable Player: Angel Anne Canino (De La Salle Lady Spikers)
- Rookie of the Year: Angel Anne Canino (De La Salle Lady Spikers)

=== Boys' tournament ===
==== Elimination round ====
Pos	Team	Pld	W	L	Pts	SW	SL	SR	SPW	SPL	SPR	Qualification
1	NUNS Bullpups	12	10	2	30	32	9	3.556	913	664	1.375	Twice-to-beat in the semifinals
2	FEU–D Baby Tamaraws	12	10	2	28	33	16	2.063	1007	816	1.234	Twice-to-beat in the semifinals
3	UE Junior Red Warriors (H)	12	8	4	25	28	15	1.867	911	807	1.129	Twice-to-win in the semifinals
4	UST Tiger Cubs	12	8	4	23	26	15	1.733	899	713	1.261	Twice-to-win in the semifinals
5	Adamson Baby Falcons	12	4	8	14	19	24	0.792	823	730	1.127	
6	Ateneo Blue Eagles	12	2	10	6	6	30	0.200	494	860	0.574	
7	Zobel Junior Archers	12	0	12	0	0	36	0.000	406	900	0.451	

Rules for classification: 1) number of wins; 2) if tied for No. 2 or 4, one-game playoff; 3) match points; 4) sets ratio; 5) points ratio; 6) head-to-head record
(H) Host

==== Playoffs ====
Semifinals (Nos. 1 & 2 have twice-to-beat advantage)
1	NSNU	3
4	UST	1
2	FEU–D	3
3	UE	1

Final (Best-of-three series)
1	NSNU	3	2	0
2	FEU–D	2	3	3

==== Awards ====
- Most Valuable Player: Eugenio Gloria (NUNS Bullpups)
- Rookie of the Year: Herbert Egger (NUNS Bullpups)

=== Girls' tournament ===
==== Elimination round ====
Pos	Team	Pld	W	L	Pts	SW	SL	SR	SPW	SPL	SPR	Qualification
1	NUNS Lady Bullpups	10	10	0	29	30	5	6.000	818	587	1.394	Qualified to the Finals
2	Adamson Lady Baby Falcons	10	7	3	21	25	11	2.273	646	555	1.164	Qualified to the Finals
3	FEU–D Lady Baby Tamaraws	10	6	4	17	19	15	1.267	703	635	1.107	
4	UST Junior Tigresses	10	5	5	17	20	16	1.250	804	699	1.150	
5	UPIS Junior Fighting Maroons	10	1	9	3	4	27	0.148	621	835	0.744	
6	Zobel Junior Lady Archers	10	1	9	3	3	28	0.107	406	759	0.535	

Rules for classification: 1) number of wins; 2) if tied for No. 2, one-game playoff; 3) match points; 4) sets ratio; 5) points ratio; 6) head-to-head record

==== Finals ====
Final (Best-of-three series)
1	NSNU	3	2	3
2	Adamson	2	3	0

==== Awards ====
- Most valuable player: Kianne Olango (NUNS Lady Bullpups)
- Rookie of the Year: Janessa Buhay (NUNS Lady Bullpups)

== Beach volleyball ==
The UAAP Season 85 beach volleyball tournament began on November 19, 2022. The tournament venue is at the Sands SM by the Bay, SM Mall of Asia in Pasay, Metro Manila. University of the East is the tournament host. The format is a single round-robin in the elimination round, a single-elimination in the battle for third and a best-of-three series in the finals.

=== Men's tournament ===
==== Elimination round ====
===== Team standings =====
Pos	Team	Pld	W	L	Pts	SW	SL	SR	SPW	SPL	SPR	Qualification
1	UST Tiger Sands	7	7	0	14	14	1	14.000	327	200	1.635	Twice-to-beat in the semifinals
2	NU Bulldogs	7	6	1	13	13	3	4.333	328	243	1.350	Twice-to-beat in the semifinals
3	FEU Tamaraws	7	5	2	12	11	5	2.200	316	275	1.149	Twice-to-win in the semifinals
4	Ateneo Blue Eagles	7	4	3	11	8	6	1.333	264	249	1.060	Twice-to-win in the semifinals
5	UP Fighting Maroons	7	2 (Note: Head to head record: UP 1–1, La Salle 1–1, ADU 1–1)	5	9	7	10	0.700	287	306	0.938	
6	De La Salle Green Spikers	7	2	5	9	5	11	0.455	259	298	0.869	
7	Adamson Soaring Falcons	7	2	5	9	4	11	0.364	234	281	0.833	
8	UE Red Warriors (H)	7	0	7	7	0	14	0.000	138	294	0.469	

Rules for classification: 1) winning percentage; 2) if tied for #2 or #4, one-game playoff; 3) head-to-head record; 4) match points; 5) sets ratio; 6) points ratio
(H) Host

===== Match-up results =====
Team ╲ Game	1	2	3	4	5	6	7
Adamson	Ateneo school colors	La Salle school colors	FEU school colors	NU school colors	UST school colors	UP school colors	UE school colors
Ateneo	Adamson school colors	UST school colors	UE school colors	UP school colors	La Salle school colors	NU school colors	FEU school colors
La Salle	UST school colors	Adamson school colors	NU school colors	UE school colors	Ateneo school colors	FEU school colors	UP school colors
FEU	UE school colors	NU school colors	Adamson school colors	UST school colors	UP school colors	La Salle school colors	Ateneo school colors
NU	UP school colors	FEU school colors	La Salle school colors	Adamson school colors	UE school colors	Ateneo school colors	UST school colors
UE	FEU school colors	UP school colors	Ateneo school colors	La Salle school colors	NU school colors	UST school colors	Adamson school colors
UP	NU school colors	UE school colors	UST school colors	Ateneo school colors	FEU school colors	Adamson school colors	La Salle school colors
UST	La Salle school colors	Ateneo school colors	UP school colors	FEU school colors	Adamson school colors	UE school colors	NU school colors

= Win; = Loss

=== Playoffs ===
Semifinals (Nos. 1 & 2 have twice-to-beat advantage)
November 27
1	UST	2
4	Ateneo	0
November 27
2	NU	2
3	FEU	0

Finals (Knockout)
November 29
1	UST	2
2	NU	0
3rd place (Knockout)
November 29
4	Ateneo	2
3	FEU	0

==== Awards ====
- Most Valuable Player: Jaron Requinton (UST Growling Tigers)
- Rookie of the Year: Jian Matthew Salarzon (Ateneo Blue Eagles)

=== Women's tournament ===
==== Elimination round ====
===== Team standings =====
Pos	Team	Pld	W	L	Pts	SW	SL	SR	SPW	SPL	SPR	Qualification
1	UST Lady Spikers	7	7	0	14	14	0	MAX	298	178	1.674	Twice-to-beat in the semifinals
2	NU Lady Bulldogs	7	6	1	13	12	3	4.000	295	214	1.379	Twice-to-beat in the semifinals
3	De La Salle Lady Spikers	7	5	2	12	10	5	2.000	287	252	1.139	Twice-to-win in the semifinals
4	UP Fighting Maroons	7	4	3	11	10	7	1.429	305	269	1.134	Twice-to-win in the semifinals
5	FEU Lady Tamaraws	7	3	4	10	7	8	0.875	289	257	1.125	
6	Adamson Lady Falcons	7	2	5	9	4	11	0.364	203	277	0.733	
7	Ateneo Blue Eagles	7	1	6	8	3	12	0.250	202	306	0.660	
8	UE Lady Warriors (H)	7	0	7	7	0	14	0.000	169	297	0.569	

Rules for classification: 1) winning percentage; 2) if tied for #2 or #4, one-game playoff; 3) head-to-head record; 4) match points; 5) sets ratio; 6) points ratio
(H) Host

===== Match-up results =====
Team ╲ Game	1	2	3	4	5	6	7
Adamson	NU school colors	La Salle school colors	UE school colors	UST school colors	Ateneo school colors	FEU school colors	UP school colors
Ateneo	La Salle school colors	NU school colors	UST school colors	UP school colors	Adamson school colors	UE school colors	FEU school colors
La Salle	Ateneo school colors	Adamson school colors	FEU school colors	UE school colors	NU school colors	UP school colors	UST school colors
FEU	UST school colors	UE school colors	La Salle school colors	NU school colors	UP school colors	Adamson school colors	Ateneo school colors
NU	Adamson school colors	Ateneo school colors	UP school colors	FEU school colors	La Salle school colors	UST school colors	UE school colors
UE	UP school colors	FEU school colors	Adamson school colors	La Salle school colors	UST school colors	Ateneo school colors	NU school colors
UP	UE school colors	UST school colors	NU school colors	Ateneo school colors	FEU school colors	La Salle school colors	Adamson school colors
UST	FEU school colors	UP school colors	Ateneo school colors	Adamson school colors	UE school colors	NU school colors	La Salle school colors

= Win; = Loss

=== Playoffs ===
Semifinals (Nos. 1 & 2 have twice-to-beat advantage)
November 27
1	UST	2
4	UP	0
November 27
2	NU	2
3	La Salle	0

Finals (Knockout)
November 29
1	UST	2
2	NU	0
3rd place (Knockout)
November 29
4	UP	2
3	La Salle	1

==== Awards ====
- Most Valuable Player: Baby Love Barbon (UST Growling Tigresses)
- Rookie of the Year: Honey Grace Cordero (NU Lady Bulldogs)

== Football ==
=== Men's tournament ===
==== Elimination round ====
Pos	Team	Pld	W	D	L	GF	GA	GD	Pts	Qualification
1	Ateneo Blue Eagles	12	6	3	3	11	9	+2	21	Qualification for semifinals
2	De La Salle Green Booters	12	6	3	3	18	17	+1	21	Qualification for semifinals
3	FEU Tamaraws	12	5	5	2	26	9	+17	20	Qualification for semifinals
4	UST Golden Booters	12	5	2	5	14	12	+2	17	Qualification for semifinals
5	UP Fighting Maroons	12	3	7	2	12	9	+3	16	
6	UE Red Warriors	12	4	4	4	18	22	−4	16	
7	Adamson Soaring Falcons	12	0	2	10	5	26	−21	2	

Source: The UAAP

==== Playoffs ====
Semifinals (Knockout)
May 11
1	Ateneo	2
4	UST	0
May 11
2	La Salle	0
3	FEU	2

Finals (Knockout)
May 18
1	Ateneo	1
3	FEU	4

==== Semifinals ====
May 11, 2023
16:30

De La Salle Green Booters	0–2	FEU Tamaraws
		Gio Pabualan 27'; Sherwin Basindanan 86'

Rizal Memorial Stadium, Manila
May 11, 2023
18:30

Ateneo Blue Eagles	2–0	UST Golden Booters
Kofi Agyei 45+1'; Galen Fernandez 53'

Rizal Memorial Stadium, Manila

==== Final ====
May 18, 2023
17:00

Ateneo Blue Eagles	1–4	FEU Tamaraws
Galen Fernandez 53'		Karl Absalon 12'; Gerald Estores 30'; Gio Pabualan 30'; Bernardo Closa 90+4' (o.g.)

Rizal Memorial Stadium, Manila

==== Awards ====
UAAP Season 85 men's football champions
FEU Tamaraws
11th title

- Most Valuable Player: Viejay Frigillano (FEU Tamaraws)
- Rookie of the Year: Karl Absalon (FEU Tamaraws)
- Best Striker: Gio Pabualan (FEU Tamaraws)
- Best Midfielder: Gio Pabualan (FEU Tamaraws)
- Best Defender: Ildefonso Escobin (Ateneo Blue Eagles)
- Best Goalkeeper: Artuz Cezar (Ateneo Blue Eagles)
- Fair Play Award: UE Red Warriors

=== Women's tournament ===
==== Elimination round ====
Pos	Team	Pld	W	D	L	GF	GA	GD	Pts	Qualification
1	FEU Lady Tamaraws	8	6	1	1	17	5	+12	19	Qualification for finals
2	De La Salle Lady Archers	8	4	2	2	19	6	+13	14 (Note: Second-seed playoff: La Salle 1–0 UP)	Qualification for finals
3	UP Fighting Maroons	8	4	2	2	8	4	+4	14	
4	UST Growling Tigresses	8	3	1	4	8	18	−10	10	
5	Ateneo Blue Eagles	8	0	0	8	1	20	−19	0	

Source: The UAAP

=== Playoff ===
May 13, 2023
17:00

De La Salle Lady Archers	1–0	UP Fighting Maroons
Angelica Teves 25' (pen.)

UP Diliman Football Stadium

=== Final ===
May 21, 2023
17:00

FEU Lady Tamaraws	2–1 (a.e.t.)	De La Salle Lady Archers
Regine Rebosura 46', 118'		Shai del Campo 90+10'

Rizal Memorial Stadium, Manila

==== Awards ====
UAAP Season 85 women's football champions
FEU Lady Tamaraws
11th title

- Most Valuable Player: Katrina Magbitang (FEU Lady Tamaraws)
- Rookie of the Year: Regine Rebosura (FEU Lady Tamaraws)
- Best Striker: Angelica Teves (De La Salle Lady Archers)
- Best Midfielder: Regine Rebosura (FEU Lady Tamaraws)
- Best Defender: Jennifer Baroin (UP Lady Maroons)
- Best Goalkeeper: Frances Acelo (UP Lady Maroons)
- Fair Play Award: Ateneo Blue Eagles

=== Boys' tournament ===
==== Elimination round ====
Pos	Team	Pld	W	D	L	GF	GA	GD	Pts	Qualification
1	FEU Tamaraws	6	5	1	0	19	3	+16	16	Qualification for finals
2	De La Salle Green Archers	6	4	1	1	13	7	+6	13	Qualification for finals
3	UST Growling Tigers	6	1	1	4	8	9	−1	4	
4	Ateneo Blue Eagles	6	0	1	5	3	24	−21	1	

Source: The UAAP

=== Final ===
March 2, 2023
15:30

FEU–D Baby Tamaraws	2–1 (a.e.t.)	Zobel Junior Archers
Ronmer Paciente 90+8', 128'		Umi Abelarde 8'

UP Diliman Football Stadium

==== Awards ====
UAAP Season 85 boys' football champions
FEU–D Baby Tamaraws
11th title, 11th consecutive title

- Most Valuable Player: Edgar Aban, Jr. (FEU–D Baby Tamaraws)
- Rookie of the Year: Justin Concepcion (Zobel Junior Archers)
- Best Striker: Selwyn Mamon (FEU–D Baby Tamaraws)
- Best Midfielder: Jian Caraig (Zobel Junior Archers)
- Best Defender: Bryan Villanueva (FEU–D Baby Tamaraws)
- Best Goalkeeper: Borg Conopio (FEU–D Baby Tamaraws)
- Fair Play Award: Ateneo Blue Eagles

== Baseball ==
=== Elimination round ===
Pos	Team	Pld	W	L	PCT	GB	Qualification
1	UP Fighting Maroons	10	7	3	.700	—	Qualified to the Finals
2	De La Salle Green Batters	10	7	3	.700	—	Qualified to the Finals
3	Adamson Soaring Falcons	10	6	4	.600	1	
4	NU Bulldogs	10	4	6	.400	3	
5	UST Golden Sox	10	4	6	.400	3	
6	Ateneo Blue Eagles	10	2	8	.200	5	

Rules for classification: 1) winning percentage; 2) if tied for #2 or #4, one-game playoff; 3) head-to-head record; 4) head-to-head point differential; 5) overall point differential

=== Finals ===
Finals (Best-of-three series)
1	UP	8	4
2	La Salle	9	8

April 18, 2023 3:30 PM at UP Diliman Baseball/Softball Field
Team	1	2	3	4	5	6	7	8	9	R	H	E
DLSU Green Batters	4	1	0	0	5	0	0	1	0	9	10	1
UP Fighting Maroons	0	5	1	2	0	0	0	0	0	8	8	2
WP: Joshua Pineda LP: Kennedy Torres

April 21, 2023 3:30 PM at UP Diliman Baseball/Softball Field
Team	1	2	3	4	5	6	7	8	9	R	H	E
UP Fighting Maroons	1	0	1	0	5	0	2	0	0	4	9	4
DLSU Green Batters	2	0	0	5	0	0	1	0	X	8	12	3
WP: Joshua Pineda LP: Kennedy Torres

== Softball ==
=== Elimination round ===
Pos	Team	Pld	W	L	PCT	GB	Qualification
1	Adamson Lady Falcons	8	7	1	.875	—	Qualified to the Finals
2	UP Fighting Maroons	8	7	1	.875	—	Qualified to the Finals
3	UST Tiger Softbelles	8	4	4	.500	3	
4	Ateneo Blue Eagles	8	1	7	.125	6	
5	De La Salle Lady Batters	8	1	7	.125	6	

Rules for classification: 1) winning percentage; 2) if tied for #2 or #4, one-game playoff; 3) head-to-head record; 4) head-to-head point differential; 5) overall point differential

=== Finals ===
Finals (Best-of-three series)
1	Adamson	2	2
2	UP	1	0

March 14, 2023 2:30 PM at UP Diliman Baseball/Softball Field
Team	1	2	3	4	5	6	7	R	H	E
UP	0	0	0	0	1	0	0	1	5	1
Adamson	0	0	1	0	0	0	1	2	3	1
WP: Glory Alonzo LP: Kacelyn Valino

March 18, 2023 2:30 PM at UP Diliman Baseball/Softball Field
Team	1	2	3	4	5	6	7	R	H	E
Adamson	0	2	0	0	0	0	0	2	2	0
UP	0	0	0	0	0	0	0	0	3	0
WP: Glory Alonzo LP: Kacelyn Valino

== Badminton ==
The UAAP Season 85 Badminton tournament began on October 29, 2022. The tournament venue is the Centro Atletico Badminton Center in Camp Crame. The format is a round-robin. National University is the tournament host.

The Finals matchups of the men's and women's tournaments were broadcast live for the first time on November 13 on the UAAP Varsity Channel.

=== Men's tournament ===
==== Elimination round ====
===== Team standings =====
Pos	Team	Pld	W	L	PCT	GB	Qualification
1	NU Bulldogs (H)	5	5	0	1.000	—	Advance to the Finals
2	Ateneo Blue Eagles	5	4	1	.800	1	Advance to the Finals
3	UP Fighting Maroons	5	3	2	.600	2	Advance to the 3rd place match
4	UST Male Golden Shuttlers	5	2	3	.400	3	Advance to the 3rd place match
5	De La Salle Green Shuttlers	5	1	4	.200	4	
6	Adamson Soaring Falcons	5	0	5	.000	5	

Rules for classification: 1) winning percentage; 2) if tied for #2 or #4, one-game playoff; 3) head-to-head record; 4) head-to-head point differential; 5) overall point differential
(H) Hosts

===== Match-up results =====
Team ╲ Game	1	2	3	4	5
Adamson	NU school colors	UP school colors	Ateneo school colors	UST school colors	La Salle school colors
Ateneo	UST school colors	La Salle school colors	Adamson school colors	UP school colors	NU school colors
La Salle	UP school colors	Ateneo school colors	UST school colors	NU school colors	Adamson school colors
NU	Adamson school colors	UST school colors	UP school colors	La Salle school colors	Ateneo school colors
UP	La Salle school colors	Adamson school colors	NU school colors	Ateneo school colors	UST school colors
UST	Ateneo school colors	NU school colors	La Salle school colors	Adamson school colors	UP school colors

= Win; = Loss

==== Playoffs ====
Finals (Knockout)
November 13
1	NU	3
2	Ateneo	0
3rd place match (Knockout)
November 13
3	UP	3
4	UST	1

==== Awards ====
- Most Valuable Players:
  - Solomon Padiz Jr. (NU Bulldogs)
  - Lanz Zafra (NU Bulldogs)
- Rookie of the Year: Jewel Angelo Albo (UP Fighting Maroons)

=== Women's tournament ===
==== Elimination round ====
===== Team standings =====
Pos	Team	Pld	W	L	PCT	GB	Qualification
1	Ateneo Blue Eagles	5	5	0	1.000	—	Advance to the Finals
2	UP Fighting Maroons	5	4	1	.800	1	Advance to the Finals
3	NU Lady Bulldogs (H)	5	3	2	.600	2	Advance to the 3rd place match
4	De La Salle Lady Shuttlers	5	2	3	.400	3	Advance to the 3rd place match
5	UST Female Golden Shuttlers	5	1	4	.200	4	
6	Adamson Lady Falcons	5	0	5	.000	5	

Rules for classification: 1) winning percentage; 2) if tied for #2 or #4, one-game playoff; 3) head-to-head record; 4) head-to-head point differential; 5) overall point differential
(H) Hosts

===== Match-up results =====
Team ╲ Game	1	2	3	4	5
Adamson	Ateneo school colors	La Salle school colors	UST school colors	NU school colors	UP school colors
Ateneo	Adamson school colors	UP school colors	NU school colors	La Salle school colors	UST school colors
La Salle	UST school colors	Adamson school colors	UP school colors	Ateneo school colors	NU school colors
NU	UP school colors	UST school colors	Ateneo school colors	Adamson school colors	La Salle school colors
UP	NU school colors	Ateneo school colors	La Salle school colors	UST school colors	Adamson school colors
UST	La Salle school colors	NU school colors	Adamson school colors	UP school colors	Ateneo school colors

= Win; = Loss

==== Playoffs ====
Finals (Knockout)
November 13
1	Ateneo	3
2	UP	2
3rd place match (Knockout)
November 13
3	NU	3
4	La Salle	1

==== Awards ====
- Most Valuable Player: Chanelle Lunod (Ateneo Blue Eagles)
- Rookie of the Year: Anthea Marie Gonzales (UP Fighting Maroons)

== Table tennis ==
The UAAP Season 85 table tennis tournament began on November 20, 2022. The tournament venue is the Makati Coliseum. De La Salle University is the tournament host.

=== Men's tournament ===
==== Elimination round ====
===== Team standings =====
Pos	Team	Pld	W	L	PCT	GB	Qualification
1	UST Tiger Paddlers	12	12	0	1.000	—	Advance to the Finals
2	Ateneo Blue Eagles	12	9	3	.750	3	Advance to Stepladder round 2
3	De La Salle Green Paddlers (H)	12	7	5	.583	5	Proceed to Stepladder round 1
4	Adamson Soaring Falcons	12	7	5	.583	5	Proceed to Stepladder round 1
5	UP Fighting Maroons	12	5	7	.417	7	
6	UE Red Warriors	12	1	11	.083	11	
7	FEU Tamaraw Paddlers	12	1	11	.083	11	

Source: UAAP on Livestats
Rules for classification: 1) winning percentage; 2) if tied for #2 or #4, one-game playoff; 3) head-to-head record; 4) match points; 5) matches ratio; 6) games ratio
(H) Hosts

===== Match-up results =====
	Round 1						Round 2					
Team ╲ Game	1	2	3	4	5	6	7	8	9	10	11	12
Adamson	Ateneo school colors	UP school colors	La Salle school colors	FEU school colors	UST school colors	UE school colors	FEU school colors	UST school colors	La Salle school colors	UE school colors	Ateneo school colors	UP school colors
Ateneo	Adamson school colors	FEU school colors	UST school colors	UE school colors	UP school colors	La Salle school colors	UE school colors	UP school colors	FEU school colors	UST school colors	Adamson school colors	La Salle school colors
La Salle	UP school colors	Adamson school colors	FEU school colors	UST school colors	UE school colors	Ateneo school colors	UP school colors	FEU school colors	UST school colors	Adamson school colors	UE school colors	Ateneo school colors
FEU	UE school colors	Ateneo school colors	UP school colors	La Salle school colors	Adamson school colors	UST school colors	Adamson school colors	La Salle school colors	UE school colors	Ateneo school colors	UP school colors	UST school colors
UE	FEU school colors	UST school colors	Ateneo school colors	UP school colors	La Salle school colors	Adamson school colors	Ateneo school colors	UP school colors	FEU school colors	UST school colors	Adamson school colors	La Salle school colors
UP	La Salle school colors	Adamson school colors	FEU school colors	UST school colors	UE school colors	Ateneo school colors	La Salle school colors	UE school colors	Ateneo school colors	FEU school colors	UST school colors	Adamson school colors
UST	UE school colors	Ateneo school colors	UP school colors	La Salle school colors	Adamson school colors	FEU school colors	Adamson school colors	La Salle school colors	UE school colors	Ateneo school colors	UP school colors	FEU school colors

= Win; = Loss

==== Playoffs ====
Stepladder round 1 (Knockout)
November 25
3	La Salle	2
4	Adamson	3

Stepladder round 2 (Knockout)
November 25
2	Ateneo	3
4	Adamson	0

Finals (Best-of-three series)
November 26
1	UST	3	3
2	Ateneo	0	0

==== Awards ====
- Most Valuable Player: Alvin Sevilla (UST Growling Tigers)
- Rookie of the Year: Eljey Dan Tormis (UST Growling Tigers)

=== Women's tournament ===
==== Elimination round ====
===== Team standings =====
Pos	Team	Pld	W	L	PCT	GB	Qualification
1	De La Salle Lady Paddlers (H)	12	12	0	1.000	—	Advance to the Finals
2	Ateneo Blue Eagles	12	9	3	.750	3	Advance to Stepladder round 2
3	UST Lady Paddlers	12	8	4	.667	4	Proceed to Stepladder round 1
4	FEU Lady Paddlers	12	7	5	.583	5	Proceed to Stepladder round 1
5	UP Fighting Maroons	12	3	9	.250	9	
6	UE Lady Warriors	12	2	10	.167	10	
7	Adamson Lady Falcons	12	1	11	.083	11	

Source: UAAP on Livestats
Rules for classification: 1) winning percentage; 2) if tied for #2 or #4, one-game playoff; 3) head-to-head record; 4) match points; 5) matches ratio; 6) games ratio
(H) Hosts

===== Match-up results =====
	Round 1						Round 2					
Team ╲ Game	1	2	3	4	5	6	7	8	9	10	11	12
Adamson	Ateneo school colors	FEU school colors	UP school colors	UST school colors	La Salle school colors	UE school colors	Ateneo school colors	UP school colors	UE school colors	UST school colors	FEU school colors	La Salle school colors
Ateneo	Adamson school colors	FEU school colors	UP school colors	UST school colors	La Salle school colors	UE school colors	Adamson school colors	La Salle school colors	UP school colors	UE school colors	UST school colors	FEU school colors
La Salle	UP school colors	UST school colors	UE school colors	Adamson school colors	Ateneo school colors	FEU school colors	Ateneo school colors	UP school colors	UE school colors	UST school colors	FEU school colors	Adamson school colors
FEU	UE school colors	Adamson school colors	Ateneo school colors	UP school colors	UST school colors	La Salle school colors	UP school colors	UE school colors	UST school colors	Adamson school colors	La Salle school colors	Ateneo school colors
UE	FEU school colors	UP school colors	UST school colors	La Salle school colors	Adamson school colors	Ateneo school colors	UST school colors	FEU school colors	Adamson school colors	La Salle school colors	Ateneo school colors	UP school colors
UP	La Salle school colors	UE school colors	Adamson school colors	Ateneo school colors	FEU school colors	UST school colors	FEU school colors	Adamson school colors	La Salle school colors	Ateneo school colors	UE school colors	UST school colors
UST	La Salle school colors	UE school colors	Adamson school colors	Ateneo school colors	FEU school colors	UP school colors	UE school colors	FEU school colors	Adamson school colors	La Salle school colors	Ateneo school colors	UP school colors

= Win; = Loss

==== Playoffs ====
Stepladder round 1 (Knockout)
November 25
3	UST	3
4	FEU	1

Stepladder round 2 (Knockout)
November 25
2	Ateneo	2
3	UST	3

Finals (Best-of-three series)
November 26
1	La Salle	3	3
3	UST	1	0

==== Awards ====
- Most Valuable Player: Jannah Romero (De La Salle Lady Archers)
- Rookie of the Year: Aizel Mae Rom (FEU Lady Tamaraws)

=== Boys' tournament ===
==== Elimination round ====
===== Team standings =====
Pos	Team	Pld	W	L	PCT	GB	Qualification
1	De La Salle Junior Green Paddlers (H)	8	8	0	1.000	—	Advance to the Finals
2	UST Junior Tiger Paddlers	7	6	1	.857	1.5	Advance to the Finals
3	UE Junior Red Warriors	8	4	4	.500	4	Advance to the 3rd place match
4	Adamson Baby Falcons	8	4	4	.500	4	Advance to the 3rd place match
5	UPIS Junior Fighting Maroons	8	1	7	.125	7	
6	Ateneo Blue Eagles	7	0	7	.000	7.5	

Source: UAAP on Livestats
Rules for classification: 1) winning percentage; 2) if tied for #2 or #4, one-game playoff; 3) head-to-head record; 4) match points; 5) matches ratio; 6) games ratio
(H) Hosts

===== Match-up results =====
	Round 1					Round 2				
Team ╲ Game	1	2	3	4	5	6	7	8	9	10
Adamson	UE school colors	UP school colors	La Salle school colors	UST school colors	Ateneo school colors	UE school colors	Ateneo school colors	La Salle school colors	UST school colors	UP school colors
Ateneo	UST school colors	La Salle school colors	UE school colors	UST school colors	Adamson school colors	La Salle school colors	Adamson school colors	UST school colors	UP school colors	UE school colors
La Salle	UP school colors	Ateneo school colors	Adamson school colors	UE school colors	UST school colors	Ateneo school colors	UP school colors	Adamson school colors	UE school colors	UST school colors
UE	Adamson school colors	UST school colors	Ateneo school colors	La Salle school colors	UP school colors	Adamson school colors	UST school colors	UP school colors	La Salle school colors	Ateneo school colors
UP	La Salle school colors	Adamson school colors	UST school colors	Ateneo school colors	UE school colors	UST school colors	La Salle school colors	UE school colors	Ateneo school colors	Adamson school colors
UST	Ateneo school colors	UE school colors	UP school colors	Adamson school colors	La Salle school colors	UP school colors	UE school colors	Ateneo school colors	Adamson school colors	La Salle school colors

= Win; = Loss

==== Playoffs ====
Finals (Best-of-three series)
November 27
1	La Salle	3	3
2	UST	1	1
3rd place match (Knockout)
November 26
3	UE	3
4	Adamson	2

==== Awards ====
- Most Valuable Player: Troy Docto (De La Salle Green Archers)
- Rookie of the Year: Jhiven Clamucha (UST Growling Tigers)

=== Girls' tournament ===
==== Elimination round ====
===== Team standings =====
Pos	Team	Pld	W	L	PCT	GB	Qualification
1	UST Junior Tigresses Paddlers	10	9	1	.900	—	Advance to the Finals
2	De La Salle Junior Lady Paddlers (H)	10	9	1	.900	—	Advance to the Finals
3	Adamson Lady Baby Falcons	10	6	4	.600	3	
4	UE Junior Lady Warriors	10	4	6	.400	5	
5	Ateneo Blue Eagles	10	2	8	.200	7	
6	UPIS Junior Lady Maroons	10	0	10	.000	9	

Source: UAAP on Livestats
Rules for classification: 1) winning percentage; 2) if tied for #2 or #4, one-game playoff; 3) head-to-head record; 4) match points; 5) matches ratio; 6) games ratio
(H) Hosts

===== Match results =====
	Round 1					Round 2				
Team ╲ Game	1	2	3	4	5	6	7	8	9	10
Adamson	UE school colors	UST school colors	UP school colors	La Salle school colors	Ateneo school colors	UE school colors	La Salle school colors	Ateneo school colors	UST school colors	UP school colors
Ateneo	La Salle school colors	UE school colors	UST school colors	UP school colors	Adamson school colors	La Salle school colors	UST school colors	Adamson school colors	UP school colors	UE school colors
La Salle	Ateneo school colors	UP school colors	UE school colors	Adamson school colors	UST school colors	Ateneo school colors	Adamson school colors	UP school colors	UE school colors	UST school colors
UE	Adamson school colors	Ateneo school colors	UST school colors	UST school colors	UP school colors	Adamson school colors	UP school colors	UST school colors	La Salle school colors	Ateneo school colors
UP	UST school colors	La Salle school colors	Adamson school colors	Ateneo school colors	UE school colors	UST school colors	UE school colors	La Salle school colors	Ateneo school colors	Adamson school colors
UST	UP school colors	Adamson school colors	Ateneo school colors	UE school colors	La Salle school colors	UP school colors	Ateneo school colors	UE school colors	Adamson school colors	La Salle school colors

= Win; = Loss

==== Finals ====
Finals (Best-of-three series)
November 26
1	UST	3	3
2	La Salle	2	1

==== Awards ====
- Most Valuable Player: Althea Jade Gudes (UST Growling Tigresses)
- Rookie of the Year: Althea Jade Gudes (UST Growling Tigresses)

== Tennis ==
The UAAP Season 85 Tennis tournament began on March 11, 2023. The tournament venue is the Felicisimo Ampon Tennis Court at the Rizal Memorial Sports Complex.

=== Men's tournament ===
==== Elimination round ====
Pos	Team	Pld	W	L	Qualification
1	Ateneo Blue Eagles	12	9 (Note: Head-to-head record: Ateneo 3–3, NU 3–3, UE 3–3, UST 3–3; match points: UE 44, NU 43, UST 41, Ateneo 40; first-seed playoff: UE 2–3 Ateneo; second-seed playoff: NU 3–2 UST)	3	Twice-to-beat in the semifinals
2	NU Bulldogs (H)	12	9	3	Twice-to-beat in the semifinals
3	UST Male Tennisters	12	9	3	Twice-to-win in the semifinals
4	UE Red Warriors	12	9	3	Twice-to-win in the semifinals
5	UP Fighting Maroons	12	4	8	
6	Adamson Soaring Falcons	12	1 (Note: Head-to-head record: Adamson 1–1 La Salle; match points: Adamson 9, La Salle 7)	11	
7	De La Salle Green Tennisters	12	1	11	

Rules for classification: 1) number of wins; 2) head-to-head record; 3) match points; 4) matches ratio; 5) games ratio
(H) Hosts

==== Playoffs ====
Semifinals (Nos. 1 & 2 have twice-to-beat advantage)
1	Ateneo	4
4	UE	1
2	NU	1	0
3	UST	3	3

Final (Best-of-three series)
1	Ateneo	2	2
3	UST	3	3

==== Awards ====
- Most Valuable Player: Nilo Ledama (UST Growling Tigers)
- Rookie of the Year: Nilo Ledama (UST Growling Tigers)

=== Women's tournament ===
==== Elimination round ====
Pos	Team	Pld	W	L	Qualification
1	NU Bulldogs (H)	8	7	1	Advance to the Finals
2	UP Fighting Maroons	8	6	2	Advance to the Finals
3	UST Female Tennisters	8	4	4	
4	Ateneo Blue Eagles	8	3	5	
5	De La Salle Lady Tennisters	8	0	8	

Rules for classification: 1) number of wins; 2) head-to-head record; 3) match points; 4) matches ratio; 5) games ratio
(H) Hosts

==== Finals ====
Finals (Best-of-three series)
1	NU	3	3
2	UP	1	2

==== Awards ====
- Most Valuable Player: Alyssa Mae Bornia (NU Lady Bulldogs)
- Rookie of the Year: Joshea Malazarte (UP Fighting Maroons)

== Swimming ==
The UAAP swimming championships were held from November 24–27, 2022 at the Teofilo Yldefonso Swimming Pool in Manila.

Ranking is determined by a point system, similar to that of the overall championship. The points given are based on the swimmer's/team's finish in the finals of an event, which include only the top eight finishers from the preliminaries. The gold medalist(s) receive 15 points, silver gets 12, bronze has 10. The following points: 8, 6, 4, 2 and 1 are given to the rest of the participating swimmers/teams according to their order of finish.

=== Men's tournament ===
==== Team standings ====
Rank	Team	Medals				Points
Rank	Team	1st place, gold medalist(s)	2nd place, silver medalist(s)	3rd place, bronze medalist(s)	Total	Points
1st place, gold medalist(s)	Ateneo	11	8	7	26	411
2nd place, silver medalist(s)	La Salle					374
3rd place, bronze medalist(s)	UP					
4	UST					125

==== Awards ====
- Most Valuable Player: Philip Joaquin Santos (Ateneo Blue Eagles)
- Rookie of the Year: Joshua Del Rio (Ateneo Blue Eagles)

=== Women's tournament ===
==== Team standings ====
Rank	Team	Medals				Points
Rank	Team	1st place, gold medalist(s)	2nd place, silver medalist(s)	3rd place, bronze medalist(s)	Total	Points
1st place, gold medalist(s)	La Salle					418
2nd place, silver medalist(s)	UP					382
3rd place, bronze medalist(s)	Ateneo	3	7	2	12	240
4	UST					112

===== Awards =====
- Most Valuable Player: Xiandi Chua (De La Salle Lady Archers)
- Rookie of the Year: Camille Buico (UP Fighting Maroons)

=== Boys' tournament ===
==== Team standings ====
Rank	Team	Medals				Points
Rank	Team	1st place, gold medalist(s)	2nd place, silver medalist(s)	3rd place, bronze medalist(s)	Total	Points
1st place, gold medalist(s)	UST					658
2nd place, silver medalist(s)	Ateneo					374
3rd place, bronze medalist(s)	DLSZ					83
4	UPIS					41

==== Awards ====
- Most Valuable Player: Ivo Enot (Ateneo Blue Eagles)
- Rookie of the Year:

=== Girls' tournament ===
==== Team standings ====
Rank	Team	Medals				Points
Rank	Team	1st place, gold medalist(s)	2nd place, silver medalist(s)	3rd place, bronze medalist(s)	Total	Points
1st place, gold medalist(s)	UST					650
2nd place, silver medalist(s)	UPIS					191
3rd place, bronze medalist(s)	Ateneo					134
4	DLSZ					87

==== Awards ====
- Most Valuable Player:
- Rookie of the Year:

== Athletics ==
The UAAP Season 85 Athletics Championships were held on November 30, December 1, 2, and 3, 2022 at the Philsports Track and Field Oval in Pasig. The tournament host was the University of the Philippines.

=== Men's tournament ===
==== Team standings ====
Rank	Team	Points
1st place, gold medalist(s)	UP Fighting Maroons	309
2nd place, silver medalist(s)	NU Bulldogs	211
3rd place, bronze medalist(s)	FEU Tamaraws	202
4	UST Golden Tracksters	140
5	Adamson Soaring Falcons	114
6	UE Red Warriors	97
7	De La Salle Green Tracksters	23
8	Ateneo Blue Eagles	5

==== Awards ====
- Most Valuable Player: Alrhyan Labita (UP Fighting Maroons)
- Rookie of the Year: Allen Mationg (FEU Tamaraws)

=== Women's tournament ===
==== Team standings ====
Rank	Team	Points
1st place, gold medalist(s)	UST Lady Tracksters	258
2nd place, silver medalist(s)	De La Salle Lady Tracksters	246
3rd place, bronze medalist(s)	UP Fighting Maroons	149
4	NU Lady Bulldogs	132
5	UE Lady Warriors	120
6	FEU Lady Tamaraws	99
7	Adamson Lady Falcons	82
8	Ateneo Blue Eagles	16

==== Awards ====
- Most Valuable Player: Alexie Caimoso (NU Lady Bulldogs)
- Rookie of the Year: Abegail Manzano (UP Fighting Maroons)

=== Boys' tournament ===
==== Team standings ====
Rank	Team	Points
1st place, gold medalist(s)	Adamson Baby Falcons	387
2nd place, silver medalist(s)	UST Junior Tracksters	329
3rd place, bronze medalist(s)	UE Red Warriors	232
4	Ateneo Blue Eagles	24
5	De La Salle Junior Tracksters	16

=== Girls' tournament ===
==== Team standings ====
Rank	Team	Points
1st place, gold medalist(s)	UST Junior Lady Tracksters	421
2nd place, silver medalist(s)	UE Junior Lady Warriors	234
3rd place, bronze medalist(s)	Adamson Lady Baby Falcons	186
4	Ateneo Blue Eagles	0
5	De La Salle Junior Lady Tracksters	0

== Performance sports ==
=== Cheerdance ===
The UAAP Season 85 cheerdance competition was held on December 10, 2022, at 4 p.m., at the SM Mall of Asia Arena in Pasay. Cheerdance competition is an exhibition event. Points for the overall championship are not awarded to the participating schools.

This Season 85 brings back the maximum 25 performers on the floor and execute a six-minute routine.

==== Team standings ====
Rank	Team	Order	Tumbling	Stunts	Tosses	Pyramids	Dance	Penalties	Points	Percentage
1st place, gold medalist(s)	NU Pep Squad	7	86.5	92	90	95	373.5	14	723	90.38%
2nd place, silver medalist(s)	FEU Cheering Squad	6	88.5	88	90.5	92	366	6	719	89.88%
3rd place, bronze medalist(s)	UST Salinggawi Dance Troupe	3	82.5	75	64.5	74	348	4	640	80.00%
4	UE Pep Squad	2	74	74	57	76	326.5	1	606.5	75.81%
5	Adamson Pep Squad	1	82	74.5	63.5	84	303	12	595	74.38%
6	UP Pep Squad	8	72	60	50.5	68	331	6	575.5	71.94%
7	DLSU Animo Squad	4	65	54	46.5	56	313	6	528.5	66.06%
8	Ateneo Blue Eagles	5	65.5	56	49	51	290	9	502.5	62.81%

== General championship summary ==
The general champion is determined by a point system. The system gives 15 points to the champion team of a UAAP event, 12 to the runner-up, and 10 to the third placer. The following points: 8, 6, 4, 2 and 1 are given to the rest of the participating teams according to their order of finish.

=== Medal tables ===
==== Collegiate division ====
Rank	Team	Gold	Silver	Bronze	Total
1	University of Santo Tomas	9	7	3	19
2	National University	7	6	4	17
3	De La Salle University	5	5	4	14
4	Ateneo de Manila University	3	4	7	14
5	University of the East	3	0	0	3
6	Far Eastern University	2	0	3	5
7	University of the Philippines Diliman	1	8	7	16
8	Adamson University*	1	1	3	5
Totals (8 entries)		31	31	31	93

* Host nation (Season host); General champions
Notes: Results are final.

==== High school division ====
Rank	Team	Gold	Silver	Bronze	Total
1	University of Santo Tomas	8	3	5	16
2	Far Eastern University–Diliman	6	1	1	8
3	University of the East	2	1	4	7
4	De La Salle Zobel	1	4	3	8
5	Adamson University*	1	4	2	7
6	Nazareth School of National University	1	3	2	6
7	Ateneo de Manila University	0	2	2	4
8	UP Integrated School	0	1	0	1
Totals (8 entries)		19	19	19	57

* Host nation (Season host); General champions
Notes: Results are final.

=== General championship tally ===
==== Collegiate division ====
		Basketball		3x3 basketball		Volleyball (indoor)		Volleyball (beach)		Swimming		Chess		Tennis		Table tennis		Badminton		Taekwondo			Judo		Baseball	Softball	Football		Athletics		Fencing		Total			
Rank	Team	M	W	M	W	M	W	M	W	M	W	M	W	M	W	M	W	M	W	M	W	C	M	W	M	W	M	W	M	W	M	W	M	W	C	Overall
1	UST	1	10	8	15	12	8	15	15	8	8	15	6	15	10	15	12	8	6	12	15	12	15	12	6	10	8	8	8	15	12	12	158	162	12	332
2	La Salle	6	12	15	4	8	15	4	8	12	15	8	12	2	6	8	15	6	8	10	10	8	10	6	15	6	10	12	2	12	8	8	124	149	8	281
3	UP	12	6	4	6	1	2	6	10	10	12	12	4	6	12	6	6	10	12	6	8	6	12	10	12	12	6	10	15	10	6	10	124	130	6	260
4	Ateneo	15	8	1	10	6	4	10	2	15	10	6	10	12	8	12	10	12	15	4	4	10	8	8	4	8	12	6	1	1	10	6	128	110	10	248
5	NU	10	15	10	12	15	12	12	12	—	—	—	15	10	15	—	—	15	10	15	12	15	—	—	8	—	—	—	12	8	—	—	107	111	15	233
6	FEU	2	2	2	2	10	6	8	6	—	—	10	8	—	—	2	8	—	—	8	6	4	—	—	—	—	15	15	10	6	—	—	67	59	4	130
7	Adamson (H)	8	4	12	8	2	10	2	4	—	—	4	2	4	—	10	2	4	4	—	—	—	—	—	10	15	2	—	6	2	—	—	64	51	0	115
8	UE	4	1	6	1	4	1	1	1	—	—	—	—	8	—	4	4	—	—	—	—	—	—	15	—	—	4	—	4	4	15	15	50	42	0	92

(H) Season host; = Champion; = Runner-up; = Third place; — = No team.
Notes: Results are final.

==== High School division ====
		Basketball	Volleyball (indoor)		Volleyball (beach)		Swimming		Chess		Table tennis		Taekwondo	Judo		Football	Athletics		Fencing		Total		
Rank	Team	B	B	G	B	G	B	G	B	G	B	G	B	B	G	B	B	G	B	G	B	G	Overall
1	UST	8	8	8	10	15	15	15	10	10	12	15	15	15	15	10	12	15	10	12	125	105	230
2	DLSZ	4	2	4	2	10	10	8	6	—	15	12	6	12	12	12	6	8	6	10	81	64	145
3	FEU–D	15	15	10	15	8	—	—	15	15	—	—	12	—	—	15	—	—	8	8	95	41	136
4	Ateneo	6	4	—	4	4	12	10	8	—	4	6	8	10	8	8	8	8	12	6	84	42	126
5	Adamson (H)	12	6	12	8	12	—	—	12	8	8	10	—	—	—	—	15	10	—	—	61	52	113
6	UE	2	10	—	6	—	—	—	—	—	10	8	—	8	10	—	10	12	15	15	61	45	106
7	NSNU	10	12	15	12	6	—	—	—	12	—	—	10	—	—	—	—	—	—	—	44	33	77
8	UPIS	1	—	6	—	—	8	12	—	—	6	4	—	—	—	—	—	—	—	—	15	22	37

(H) Season host; = Champion; = Runner-up; = Third place; — = No team.
Notes: Results are final.

=== Overall awards ===
The following were awarded during the closing ceremonies on May 27, 2023, at the SM Mall of Asia Arena:

- Collegiate division athletes of the year:
  - Individual sports: Xiandi Chua (De La Salle Lady Archers), women's swimming
  - Team sports: Nickole dela Cruz (UP Fighting Maroons), softball
- High school division athletes of the year:
  - Individual sports: Kent Francis Jardin (Adamson Baby Falcons), boys' athletics
  - Team sports: John Rey Pasaol (FEU–D Baby Tamaraws), boys' basketball

== See also ==
- NCAA Season 98
