= Swimming at the 2025 SEA Games – Women's 100 metre butterfly =

Women's 100 metre butterfly at the 2025 SEA Games
- Venue: SAT Swimming Pool
- Date: 13 December
- Competitors: 10 from 6 nations
- Winning time: 59.76

Medalists
gold medal	Quah Ting Wen	Singapore
silver medal	Quah Jing Wen	Singapore
bronze medal	Napatsawan Jaritkla	Thailand

The women's 100 metre butterfly event at the 2025 SEA Games took place on 13 December 2025 at the SAT Swimming Pool in Bangkok, Thailand.

== Schedule ==
All times are Indochina Standard Time (UTC+07:00)

Date	Time	Event
Monday, 13 December 2025	9:00	Heats
Monday, 13 December 2025	18:00	Final

== Records ==
Prior to this competition, the existing world, Asian, and Southeast Asian Games records were as follows.

World Record	Gretchen Walsh (USA)	54.60	Fort Lauderdale, United States	3 May 2025
Asian Record	Zhang Yufei (CHN)	55.62	Qingdao, China	29 September 2020
Games Record	Tao Li (SGP)	58.84	Palembang, Indonesia	12 November 2011

== Results ==
=== Heats ===
Rank	Heat	Lane	Swimmer	Nationality	Time	Notes
1	2	4	Quah Jing Wen	Singapore	1:00.87	Q
2	2	5	Napatsawan Jaritkla	Thailand	1:01.76	Q
3	1	4	Quah Ting Wen	Singapore	1:01.98	Q
4	1	3	Lim Shun Qi	Malaysia	1:02.15	Q
5	2	2	Micaela Jasmine Mojdeh	Philippines	1:02.42	Q
6	2	3	Michelle Surjadi Fang	Indonesia	1:02.61	Q
7	2	6	Miranda Cristina Renner	Philippines	1:02.65	Q
8	1	2	Shannon Tan Yan Qing	Malaysia	1:03.46	Q
9	1	6	Nadia Aisha Nurazmi	Indonesia	1:03.97	R
10	2	7	Oo Nan Honey	Myanmar	1:05.28	R

=== Final ===
Rank	Lane	Swimmer	Nationality	Time	Notes
1st place, gold medalist(s)	3	Quah Ting Wen	Singapore	59.76	
2nd place, silver medalist(s)	4	Quah Jing Wen	Singapore	59.77	
3rd place, bronze medalist(s)	5	Napatsawan Jaritkla	Thailand	1:01.57	
4	2	Michelle Surjadi Fang	Indonesia	1:01.67	
5	6	Lim Shun Qi	Malaysia	1:01.89	
6	8	Nadia Aisha Nurazmi	Indonesia	1:02.17	
7	7	Miranda Cristina Renner	Philippines	1:02.61	
8	1	Shannon Tan Yan Qing	Malaysia	1:02.96	
