= Chloe Isleta =

Filipino-American swimmer (born 1998)

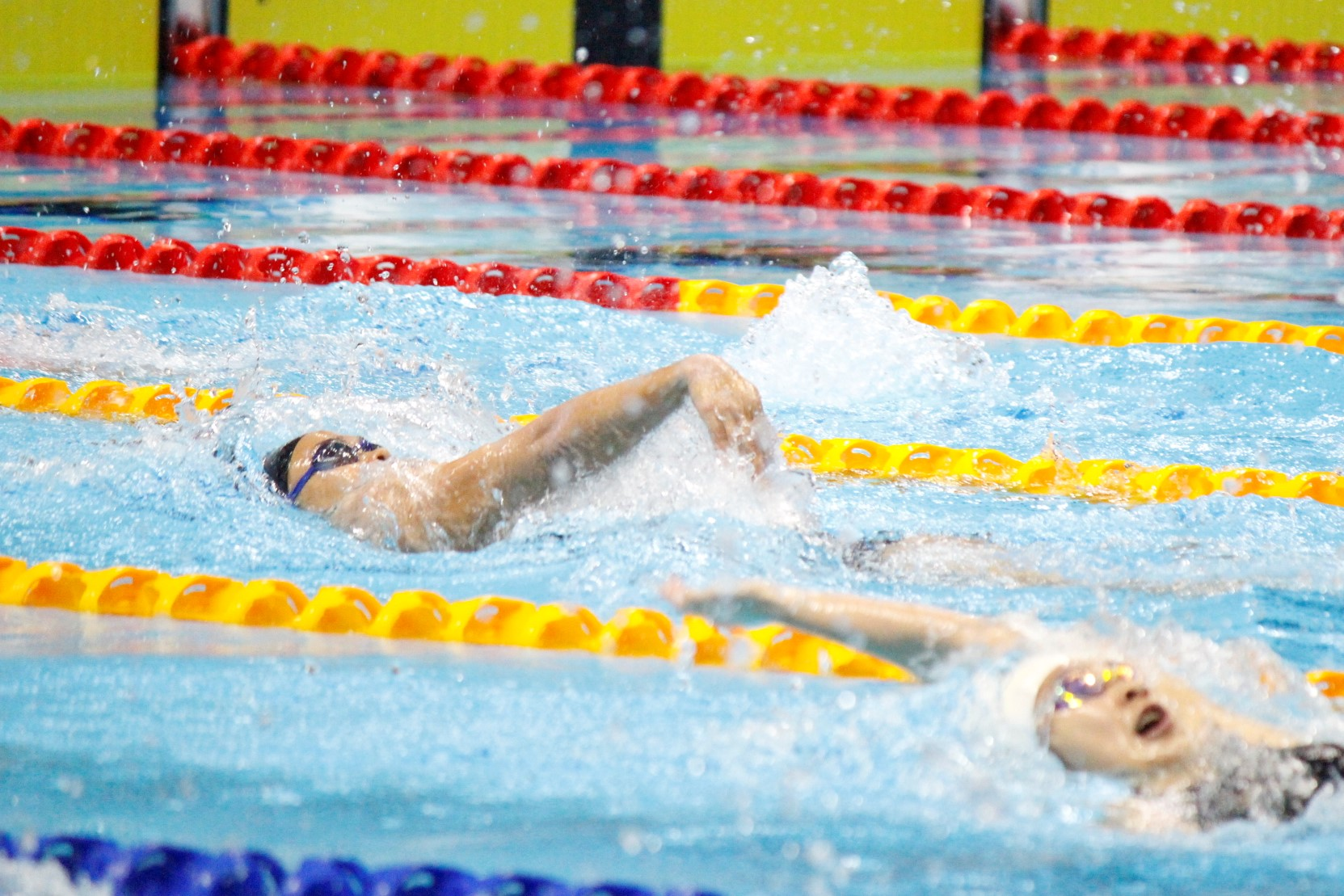
- Isleta (left) at the 2019 SEA Games

Personal information
- Full name: Chloe Kennedy Anne Doromal Isleta
- National team: Philippines
- Born: May 14, 1998 (age 28)
- Height: 5 ft 1 in (155 cm)

Sport
- Sport: Swimming
- Strokes: Backstroke
- College team: Arizona State University; De La Salle University (Manila)
Medal record
Women's swimming
Representing Philippines
| Event | 1st | 2nd | 3rd |
|---|---|---|---|
| Southeast Asian Games | 2 | 6 | 2 |
| Total | 2 | 6 | 2 |
Southeast Asian Games
| Gold medal – first place | 2021 Vietnam | 200 m backstroke |
| Gold medal – first place | 2025 Thailand | 4 × 100 m freestyle relay |
| Silver medal – second place | 2019 Philippines | 4 × 100 m medley relay |
| Silver medal – second place | 2019 Philippines | 100 m backstroke |
| Silver medal – second place | 2021 Vietnam | 100 m backstroke |
| Silver medal – second place | 2021 Vietnam | 4 × 100 m medley relay |
| Silver medal – second place | 2023 Cambodia | 200 m backstroke |
| Silver medal – second place | 2025 Thailand | 4 × 200 m freestyle relay |
| Bronze medal – third place | 2019 Philippines | 200 m backstroke |
| Bronze medal – third place | 2023 Cambodia | 4×200 m freestyle relay |

Chloe Kennedy Anne Doromal Isleta (born May 14, 1998) is a Filipino-American swimmer.

== Early life and education ==
Chloe Isleta is born on May 14, 1998 to Bill Walker and Cecile Doromal. She is a native of San Jose, California. Isleta studied at the Presentation High School in San Jose. She attended Arizona State University where she pursued a degree in journalism and mass communication. She would later study at the De La Salle University in Manila, Philippines.

== Swimming career ==
=== Early years ===
Isleta took up swimming as early as when she was six years old. She started her career in the United States. During her senior year at Presentation, she won the 200 individual medley at the California State Championship, She was also part of the Palo Alto Stanford Aquatics team.

=== Collegiate ===
Isleta was part of Arizona State's Sun Devils swimming team, where she was able to train under Bob Bowman. She competed for De La Salle swimming team at the University Athletic Association of the Philippines (UAAP) for just one year – in Season 85. She broke her school's championship drought in swimming since Season 66 in 2003 by winning five gold and two silver medals as well broke competition records in backstroke.

=== National team ===
Isleta competed for the Philippines in international swimming competitions. She took part in the 2019 SEA Games hosted at home, winning two silvers (4×100 meter medley relay and the 100-meter backstroke) and a bronze medal (200 meter backstroke).

Isleta debuted at the FINA World Swimming Championships (25 m) in the 2021 edition.

In May 2022, Isleta would win the Philippines' first SEA Games gold medal in swimming since 1993, at the 2021 SEA Games in Vietnam. She emerged as the best swimmer in the 200 meters backstroke event.

She would qualify for the 2022 World Aquatics Championships in Hungary via FINA points but due to the qualification procedures and withdrawals of other Filipino athletes she was not able to participate due to tournament regulations giving preference to athletes qualifying through standard entry times.

At the 2022 ASEAN University Games, Isleta won four out of five of the Philippine delegation's swimming gold medals. She also bagged a bronze.
