= Kayla Sanchez =

Filipino-Canadian swimmer (born 2001)

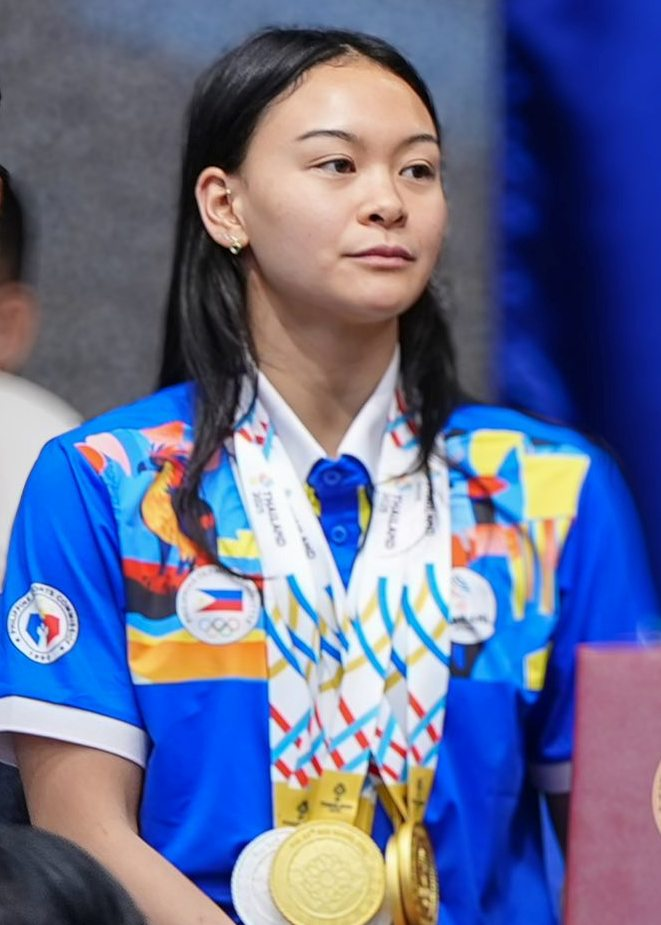
- Sanchez in 2025

Personal information
- Full name: Kayla Noelle Sanchez
- National team: Philippines (2023–present); Canada (2017–2022)
- Born: 7 April 2001 (age 25) Singapore
- Height: 170 cm (5 ft 7 in)

Sport
- Sport: Swimming
- Strokes: Freestyle, individual medley
- Club: Energy Standard; High Performance Centre - Ontario, Ajax Aquatic Club
- College team: University of British Columbia
- Coach: Derrick Schoof
Medal record
Women's swimming
Event	1st	2nd	3rd
Olympic Games	0	1	1
World Championships (LC)	0	2	4
World Championships (SC)	3	1	0
Southeast Asian Games	3	5	0
Total	6	9	5
Representing the Philippines
Southeast Asian Games
Gold medal – first place	2025 Thailand	4×100 m freestyle relay
Gold medal – first place	2025 Thailand	100 m freestyle
Gold medal – first place	2025 Thailand	100 m backstroke
Silver medal – second place	2025 Thailand	4×200 m freestyle relay
Silver medal – second place	2025 Thailand	4×100 m medley relay
Silver medal – second place	2025 Thailand	200 m freestyle
Silver medal – second place	2025 Thailand	50 m backstroke
Silver medal – second place	2025 Thailand	50 m freestyle
Representing Canada
Olympic Games
Silver medal – second place	2020 Tokyo	4×100 m freestyle
Bronze medal – third place	2020 Tokyo	4×100 m medley
World Championships (LC)
Silver medal – second place	2022 Budapest	4×100 m freestyle
Silver medal – second place	2022 Budapest	4×100 m mixed freestyle
Bronze medal – third place	2019 Gwangju	4×100 m freestyle
Bronze medal – third place	2019 Gwangju	4×200 m freestyle
Bronze medal – third place	2022 Budapest	4×200 m freestyle
Bronze medal – third place	2022 Budapest	4×100 m medley
World Championships (SC)
Gold medal – first place	2021 Abu Dhabi	4×100 m freestyle
Gold medal – first place	2021 Abu Dhabi	4×200 m freestyle
Gold medal – first place	2021 Abu Dhabi	4×50 m mixed freestyle
Silver medal – second place	2021 Abu Dhabi	4×100 m medley
Pan Pacific Championships
Bronze medal – third place	2018 Tokyo	4×100 m freestyle
Bronze medal – third place	2018 Tokyo	4×200 m freestyle
Commonwealth Games
Silver medal – second place	2018 Gold Coast	4×100 m freestyle
Silver medal – second place	2018 Gold Coast	4×200 m freestyle
World Junior Championships
Gold medal – first place	2017 Indianapolis	4×100 m freestyle
Gold medal – first place	2017 Indianapolis	4×200 m freestyle
Gold medal – first place	2017 Indianapolis	4×100 m medley
Silver medal – second place	2017 Indianapolis	200 m medley
Bronze medal – third place	2017 Indianapolis	100 m freestyle
Junior Pan Pacific Championships
Silver medal – second place	2016 Maui	4×100 m freestyle

Kayla Noelle Sanchez (born 7 April 2001) is a swimmer who has represented the Philippines internationally since 2023. Sanchez initially represented Canada until 2022 at the Olympic and World championship level, and is a two-time Olympic medalist in Tokyo.

== Early life ==
Kayla Sanchez was born on 7 April 2001 in Singapore, to Overseas Filipino Workers in the country. Her father is a native of Mabalacat, Pampanga, while her mother traces her roots to Baguio. She joined a swimming team at age 4.After a few years, her family eventually emigrated to Canada.

== Career ==
=== 2017 season ===
Sanchez made her debut in major international competition in 2017, as part of the Canadian team for the 2017 World Junior Swimming Championships team in Indianapolis. She won two individual medals, a silver in the 200 m individual medley and bronze in the 100 m freestyle, and was part of a Canadian sweep of the gold medals in the women's relay events, taking gold in the 4x100 m and 4x200 freestyle as well as in the 4x100 medley. In the process the team broke the junior world record and championship record.

Later that year she also competed at her senior championships, the 2017 World Aquatics Championships in Budapest. Sanchez was part of the Canadian team in the women's 4×100 m freestyle relay event, finishing fourth overall.

=== 2018 season ===
In September 2017, Sanchez was named to Canada's 2018 Commonwealth Games team. Individually, she finished sixth in the 50 m freestyle, seventh in the 100 m freestyle, and ninth in the heats of the 200 m medley. She won two silver medals as part of the Canadian relay teams in the 4x100 m and 4x200 m.

=== 2019 season ===
In the Autumn of 2019, Sanchez was member of the inaugural International Swimming League swimming for the Energy Standard International Swim Club, who won the team title in Las Vegas, Nevada, in December. At the London match in November she won the 200m Freestyle over teammate Femke Heemskerk in a time of 1:52.72. Competing as part of the Canadian team for the 2019 World Aquatics Championships in Gwangju, she won bronze medals in the 4x100 m and 4x200 m freestyle relays.

=== 2020 Summer Olympics ===
In 2021, Sanchez was part of the Canadian team for the 2020 Summer Olympics in Tokyo. She won a silver medal as part of the Canadian team in the 4x100 m freestyle relay, alongside Maggie Mac Neil, Rebecca Smith, and Penny Oleksiak. She also swam the freestyle leg in the heats of the 4x100 m medley relay, helping the Canadian team finish the heats in first place, and earned a bronze medal when the finals team finished third (having been replaced in the final by Oleksiak).

Sanchez competed individually in the heats of the 100 m freestyle, setting a new personal best and qualifying through to the semi-finals, but withdrew to conserve energy for the 4x200 m freestyle relay, where the Canadian team ultimately finished fourth.

=== 2021 season ===
Sanchez announced plans to study political science at the University of British Columbia beginning in January 2022, following the completion of the ISL's third season. As part of her studies she would compete as part of UBC's Thunderbirds swimming team.

The season concluded at the 2021 World Swimming Championships, where Sanchez won four medals (three gold and one silver) as part of Canadian relay teams.

=== 2022 season ===
At the Canadian swimming trials for upcoming championship events, Sanchez was fourth in the 200 m freestyle, before unexpectedly winning the 100 m event, finishing 0.02 ahead of Penny Oleksiak. She concluded the event with a decisive win in the 50 m freestyle.

Beginning the 2022 World Aquatics Championships in the 4x100 m freestyle relay, Sanchez was part of Canada's silver medal-winning team, a first for Canadian women at the World Championships. She won her second medal of the championships in the 4×200 m freestyle relay, where the Canadian team finished third. On the same day, Sanchez placed sixth in the semi-finals of the 100 m freestyle, qualifying to her first individual Worlds final. Sanchez qualified to the semi-finals of the 50 m freestyle, but scratched from the semi-finals in order to conserve energy for the 4×100 m mixed freestyle relay final in the same session. She recorded a personal best relay split time of 52.52 as part of the Canadian team's silver medal win. Sanchez then competed the freestyle leg for Team Canada in the heats of the 4×100 m medley relay, helping the team qualify to the final in fourth position. She was replaced in the final by Oleksiak, but shared in the team's bronze medal win. She, Oleksiak and Summer McIntosh jointly set a record at the championships for most medals by a Canadian swimmer at a single edition, with four each.

In July 2022, Philippine Swimming announced that Sanchez would start representing the Philippines.

=== 2023 season ===
World Aquatics would approve Sanchez's sporting nationality change, enabling her to compete for the Philippines from 6 July 2023 onwards. Her competitive debut as a swimmer for the Philippines occurred at the 2022 Asian Games.

By late 2023, the International Olympic Committee waived her residency requirement for her nationality change, making her eligible to qualify for the Philippines in the 2024 Summer Olympics.

=== 2024 Summer Olympics ===
At the games in Paris, Sanchez reached the semi-final stage of the 100m freestyle with a time of 54.21 having set a Philippines national record in the heats with a time of 53.67.

=== 2025 season ===
Sanchez swam in the 2025 SEA Games in Thailand winning three gold medals and five silver medals. She broke three Philippine national records in relay events.

== Personal bests ==
=== Long course (50 m pool) ===
Event	Time	Meet	Location	Date	Notes
50 m freestyle	24.68	2021 Canadian Olympic Swimming Trials	Toronto, Canada	21 June 2021	
100 m freestyle	53.12	2020 Summer Olympics	Tokyo, Japan	28 July 2021	
200 m freestyle	1:57.23	2018 Pan Pacific Swimming Championships	Tokyo, Japan	9 August 2018	
400 m freestyle	4:21.88	2016 Canadian Olympic Swimming Trials	Toronto, Canada	5 April 2016	
50 m backstroke	28.13	2019 TYR Pro Swim Series	Knoxville, United States	10 January 2019	
100 m backstroke	59.78	2021 Canadian Olympic Swimming Trials	Toronto, Canada	19 June 2021	
200 m backstroke	2:15.86	2016 Age Group International	Etobicoke, Canada	4 June 2016	
50 m butterfly	27.52	2023 Eindhoven Qualification Meet	Eindhoven, Netherlands	9 April 2023	
100 m butterfly	1:01.94	2016 Ontario Summer LC Championships	Etobicoke, Canada	1 July 2016	
200 m individual medley	2:12.64	2017 FINA World Junior Swimming Championships	Indianapolis, United States	26 August 2017	
400 m individual medley	4:57.46	2016 Speedo Eastern Canadian Open	Montreal, Canada	19 February 2016	

=== Short course (25 m pool) ===
Event	Time	Meet	Location	Date	Notes
50 m freestyle	23.71	2019 International Swimming League	London, United Kingdom	24 November 2019	
100 m freestyle	51.45	2018 Swim England Winter Championships (25m)	Sheffield, United Kingdom	14 December 2018	WJR, NR
200 m freestyle	1:52.59	2018 Lausanne Swim Cup	Lausanne, Switzerland	21 December 2018	
400 m freestyle	4:13.27	2024 University of Calgary Dino Invitational	Calgary, Canada	25 October 2024	NR
50 m backstroke	26.36	2019 Ontario Junior International	Toronto, Canada	13 December 2019	
100 m backstroke	58.12	2017 NYAC Cup	Toronto, Canada	4 November 2017	
50 m breaststroke	30.44	2018 Downtown Sprint Meet	Toronto, Canada	20 October 2018	
100 m breaststroke	1:05.93	2019 Ontario Junior International	Toronto, Canada	13 December 2019	
50 m butterfly	25.85	2025 U Sports Swimming Championships	Toronto, Canada	7 March 2025	NR
100 m individual medley	57.80	2018 Lausanne Swim Cup	Lausanne, Switzerland	21 December 2018	
200 m individual medley	2:04.64	2018 Swim England Winter Championships (25m)	Sheffield, United Kingdom	14 December 2018	
