= Concerns and controversies at the 2019 SEA Games =

There were numerous concerns and controversies about the 2019 SEA Games, which was hosted in the Philippines.

== Accommodations and transportation ==
- Similar cases of delays and inadequacies in transportation and accommodations occurred upon the arrivals of the Cambodia, Myanmar, Thailand, and Timor-Leste national football teams, who were among the first set of athletes to arrive in the country ahead of the tournament, during the weekend of 23–24 November 2019:
  - Pictures surfaced on social media of the Timor-Leste national football team waiting for their team bus to fetch them from Ninoy Aquino International Airport, upon their arrival on 23 November. Their bus reportedly fetched them two and a half hours later than scheduled, which then transported them to the wrong hotel.
  - The Myanmar national football team, who arrived in Manila a few hours after the Timorese team, reportedly also waited excessively for their bus to fetch them at the airport. In addition, they complained that their bus, a minibus, was "cramped" and uncomfortable. Myanmar-based media sources reported that the team was unable to hold their first training session due to the delays.
  - The Thailand national football team, through a Facebook post from the Football Association of Thailand, complained about the limited and repeated food and water rations provided to them at their hotel, as well as the disorganization of their hotel rooms, having to accommodate three players into rooms designed to accommodate a maximum of only two. In response, association president Somyot Poompanmoung was notified of their situation and ordered the association to provide the team more food. PHISGOC also responded by saying that they would provide more water bottles. Head coach Akira Nishino also revealed that the team was prompted to cancel their first training session due to heavy traffic and the distance between their hotel in Manila, Century Park Hotel, and the training grounds at the UP Diliman Football Field in Quezon City, forcing the team to train on the streets outside of their hotel.
  - Pictures circulated online of the Cambodia national football team sleeping on the carpeted floor of the private conference room at their hotel. Head coach Felix Darmas revealed that they waited for about eight to nine hours.
  - In response, PHISGOC sent an official statement issuing an apology to the four teams, following a direct complaint from the Timor-Leste football team. Century Park Hotel, the designated hotel for the Cambodian and Thai delegations, also responded by stating that there were no arrangements made with the PHISGOC regarding early check-ins for the teams, as some teams such as Timor-Leste's arrived a few hours before their check-in time. Century Park also addressed the limited and repeated food and water rations offered to the Thai delegation, by stating that a cycle menu for the SEA Games delegation as well as two bottles of water per day to be supplied per person based on hotel industry standards was prepared. On 26 November, Vallacar Transit CEO Leo Yanson, who also owns the local football club Ceres–Negros F.C., coordinated with the Philippine Football Federation (PFF) to lend 17 coaches intended for the transport of the national teams for the remainder of the tournament in lieu of the minibuses arranged by PHISGOC. PAREF Southridge School in Muntinlupa, Metro Manila offered its artificial turf to be used by the teams for training sessions.
- A number of local volunteers for the SEA Games complained about the lack of updates on the status of their deployment and expressed confusion regarding the transportation arrangement for their travel to the venues. The PHISGOC initially announced that they would provide Premium Point-to-Point Bus Services for the volunteers, although they clarified that they would be unable to provide accommodations and other modes of transportation for them. On 25 November 2019, SEA Games volunteer program head Chris Tiu responded that the lack of updates on the status of the volunteers' deployment was due to the numerous cases of missing requirements amongst volunteers. Tiu, however, reassured that they were finalizing their schedules. He added that the schedules would dictate the pickup points for the transportation of the volunteers.
- Indonesian news website Suara.com reported that the Indonesia national polo team waited for three hours at Ninoy Aquino International Airport for their transport to fetch them to their hotel.
- Logistics woes hounded the arrival of the women volleyball players of Thailand. They were stranded at the airport upon arrival at NAIA.

=== Provision of meals ===
- The National Commission on Muslim Filipinos claimed that the PHISGOC had disregarded its recommendation to assist in the service of halal-certified meals, as well as the provision of segregated prayer rooms equipped with a qibla, for Muslim delegates during the tournament. It followed complaints from the Singaporean delegation, who issued a letter to PHISGOC regarding the lack of halal food options in their accommodations. The South China Morning Post reports that Muslim athletes and officials from Singapore were served kikiam, which contains ground pork that Muslims are prohibited from consuming, only to rectify it after Singapore clarifies that their Muslim athletes were not served pork. The head chef at the Athletes Village at New Clark City Sports Hub has also assured that all the meals served in the village would be fully halal-certified after consultation with the nutritionists of some of the delegations.
- An Indonesian Muslim media officer in the delegation of the Indonesia national football team complained that he was accidentally served a pork dish, claiming that PHISGOC could not make the distinction between halal-certified and non-halal meals.
- The Malaysian contingent decided to prepare food from Malaysia after the host failed to guarantee that halal food would be served during the event. It was also reported that Malaysian journalists had difficulty in sourcing halal food and the Sportswriters Association of Malaysia has resorted to eating halal canned food.
- On November 26, a report from GMA News's 24 Oras stated that the Philippine women's football team coach complained over kikiam with rice and egg being served as a breakfast by the SEA Games organizers. The hotel later explained that the kikiam was actually chicken sausage, and that it was part of a buffet that included other food as well as an egg omelette station. The hotel claimed in a statement that the coach later apologized to the hotel for the error.
- Jacob Joseph and Mai Đức Chung, the head coaches of the Malaysian and Vietnamese women's football teams respectively, shared that the Malaysian team only had "bread and some egg" served to them for breakfast. Chung requested for additional food and police escorts for the Vietnamese team en route to a training session at the Biñan Football Stadium, claiming that traffic was affecting their training schedules.

== Financial concerns ==
- There were reports in March 2019 that the Philippines might lose hosting rights of the 2019 Southeast Asian Games due to budgetary concerns and an alleged leadership dispute within the Philippine Olympic Committee. The proposed budget allotted for the games has been cut down by Senate to ₱5 billion from ₱7.5 billion. The chairman of the organizing committee Alan Peter Cayetano, who is also the Speaker of the House of Representatives, has assured that the hosting will push through citing support from the private sector and continued efforts by the organizers to secure government funding for the games.
- There was allegation of corruption by the PHILSOC Foundation led by Alan Peter Cayetano particularly it entered in an allegedly overprice deal regarding athlete uniform and sporting equipment. The Philippine government said that there could not be any corruption since it is the Philippine Sports Commission and the Department of Budget and Management are responsible for disbursement of funds in the games.
- Netizens criticized the PHISGOC's choice of venue for the bowling events, Starmall EDSA Shaw in Mandaluyong. Many claimed that the choice favoured the Villar political family who own the Filipino real estate company Vista Land, the parent company of Starmall. PHISGOC chairman, House Speaker Alan Peter Cayetano, denied the claim by clarifying that the bowling alley to be used during the events is operated by a different firm. Cayetano justified the PHISGOC's choice of venue as having met World Bowling standards.
- Senate Minority Floor Leader Franklin Drilon questioned the ₱50 million (US$1 million) budget allotted for the construction of the 2019 SEA Games cauldron (Filipino: kaldero). During the plenary deliberations of the Bases Conversion and Development Authority's (BCDA) budget for the 2019 SEA Games at the Philippine Senate, Drilon lamented that the budget could have been used for other purposes of national importance, such as the construction of classrooms instead. Senator Sonny Angara, chairman of the Senate finance committee, defended the budget by saying that the cauldron is intended to showcase Filipino ingenuity. Senator Bong Go, chairman of the Senate sports committee, added that the government plans to lease out the cauldron after the event. President Rodrigo Duterte denied corruption allegations over its construction and reiterated Angara's claim, even adding that the PHISGOC commissioned Francisco Mañosa, a National Artist of the Philippines for Architecture, to design the cauldron. Alan Peter Cayetano denied that the budget for the cauldron was overpriced and said that it was cheaper than the cauldron constructed for the 2015 Southeast Asian Games in Singapore, which cost around ₱62 million ($1.2 million).
- In November 2019, the BCDA denied involvement in a funding scheme with the Malaysian investment holding firm MTD Capital Berhad for the construction of some facilities in the New Clark City Sports Hub. Local media sources reported that the firm would receive half of the shares earned from the usage of the facilities, estimated to be ₱2.5 billion in return. While the Philippine Competition Commission had approved the joint venture between the BCDA and MTD for the construction of the National Government Administrative Center in March, the BCDA claimed that none of the firm's sources of finance originated from the Philippine government. Instead, the Philippine government opted to pay MTD in full in order to avoid accrued interest, according to the BCDA's official statement. The BCDA admitted that they had yet to pay the firm.
- In December 2019, the Office of the Ombudsman said it had created a fact-finding panel to probe the possibility of corruption in the organization of the games.

== Health and safety ==
- A volunteer construction worker at the Rizal Memorial Stadium in Manila fell from a scaffolding he was dismantling, hours before the first football match at the stadium, due to heavy rains. The worker was admitted to the nearby Ospital ng Maynila Medical Center, where the attending physician declared that he had suffered a fractured skull and a blood clot in his head. The worker claimed that his team was "forced to work nearly 24 hours on a single stretch" as they were behind schedule.
- Faiq Bolkiah, team captain of the Brunei national football team and the nephew of Sultan Hassanal Bolkiah, was admitted to the Manila Doctors Hospital in Ermita, Manila on the evening of 24 November after suffering a peanut allergy. An official from the Brunei football team's medical staff stated that Faiq's allergic reaction originated from a curry dish served for dinner at his hotel, causing swelling of his lips. Following the incident, the medical official requested the organizers to list the ingredients of every meal served. Faiq has since fully recovered from the incident.
- Muhammad Faizul M. Nasir, a Malaysian athlete, was injured in the face after being kicked in the face which was an illegal move in Pencak silat by while sparring against host athlete Dines Dumaan in the second round of the Putra B class (50–55 kg) pencak silat event on Tuesday. He fell unconscious on the ground for three whole minutes. Faizul, who previously won two gold medals in 2017, was rushed to The Medical City Clark for further treatment. Dumaan was declared the winner with a score of 5–0.

== Infrastructure and logistical delays ==
- On 21 November 2019, nine days before the start of the 2019 SEA Games, House Speaker Alan Peter Cayetano confirmed that preparations at the Rizal Memorial Sports Complex in Manila and venues in Tagaytay remain incomplete. He cited delays in the passage of spending bills containing the SEA Games budget in the Congress of the Philippines, which in turn delayed the governmental procurement process. Cayetano reassured that the PHISGOC was prepared to activate contingent venues should the original venues not be completed in time.
  - On 25 November, hours before the first men's football match between Malaysia and Myanmar, the media center at the Rizal Memorial Stadium was reported to have remained unfurnished. Despite that, media personnel were accommodated. A Malaysian official reported that the dressing rooms were still under renovation. Scaffolding were also visible in the facade of the stadium during that time, although it was reportedly removed only minutes before the match. The match between Malaysia and Myanmar went on without any main score board in the stadium.
  - Squash doubles events including men's jumbo doubles, women's jumbo doubles and mixed doubles were axed from the Games as the host was unable to get the squash court at the Rizal Memorial Sports Complex ready on time, while there are no other doubles and jumbo doubles facilities in the country. The squash events will be held at the Manila Polo Club instead of the original venue, and will see the addition of team competitions for both men and women to replace the previously scrapped doubles events.
- On 5 December 2019, live broadcasting for a football match between Indonesia and Laos was canceled just one hour before the kick-off, citing logistical and cost constraints as the cause. RCTI, Indonesian broadcaster set to live stream the match, resorted to Facebook live stream service due to the incident. Later, due to unreliability of the live stream, they had to comment on the match without the live video.

== Organization ==
- Vietnam criticized the exclusion of athletics events namely women's long jump, high jump, heptathlon, the marathon, the men's and women's 10,000m race which they consider as traditional events as "unreasonable". The marathon in particular has featured in every iteration of the games since the first edition in 1896.
- The Vietnam Football Federation filed a complaint regarding the seeding of the Vietnam national team in Pot 4 for the men's football tournament draw along with Laos, Cambodia, Brunei and Timor-Leste. They questioned how could Vietnam which collected 10 points in the group stage of the 2017 edition of the games or higher than the two teams seeded Pot 3 (Myanmar with 9 points and Singapore with 6 points). Vietnam was later elevated to Pot 3 and Singapore relegated to Pot 4.
- Wrestling Association of the Philippines (WAP) President Alvin Aguilar alleged PHISGOC Executive Director Tom Carrasco of sabotage regarding the exclusion of wrestling from the games. Aguilar said that Carrasco trimmed the number of events in wrestling including grappling events which WAP concluded that the Philippines has strong chances of performing well before excluding it from the games altogether. Carrasco refuted saying that wrestling's international federation, United World of Wrestling (UWW) should have signed the sport's events handbook for the games. Aguilar said that UWW did indeed signed the document by its Vice President, but Carassco insists it should be the organization's president. Wrestling was reinstated after the game organizers received a letter from UWW Secretary General Michel Dusson regarding its consent to include the sport in the games.
- The late decision taken by host Philippines for changes of several tournament venues to the capital of Manila dissatisfied the Malaysian contingent as expressed by their Chef-de-Mission to the Games, Megat Zulkarnain Omardin as it would have an impact on their logistics since the capital was already crowded. The Chef-de-Mission added that the host also still did not distribute technical handbooks on the events that were supposed to be handed out earlier to every competing country for their preparation, which was causing problems for athletes and officials to manage their schedules ahead of the tournament.
- On 25 November, spectators attending the men's football match between the Philippines and Cambodia at the Rizal Memorial Stadium in Manila expressed difficulty in retrieving their belongings from security personnel after the match. Spectators were prohibited from bringing their bags into the stadium and were asked to deposit it at a single baggage counter outside the stadium, thus experiencing a large crowd for which many complained about. Spectators also complained about the lack of restrooms inside the stadium. The management had deployed several portable toilets outside the stadium in an attempt to recompense the lack of restrooms.
- Gymnastics judge Linzi Arellano-Co complained that she personally had to borrow chairs and tables from her mother to be used for the gymnastics competitions.
- Pamela Mejia, a Filipino social entrepreneur, revealed PHISGOC’s disadvantageous offer of purchasing 5,000 woven bags made by female weavers who are persons with disability. She claimed that when her company presented its price, PHISGOC replied asking if they will allow a price that is acceptable enough to help the country ("para sa bayan"), which is PHP50.00 per bag (or approximately USD1.00 in 2019 exchange rate). She decried what she perceived as an unfair amount when the cauldron at the New Clark City Athletics Stadium cost PHP50 million (USD1 million in 2019 exchange rate).

== Weather conditions ==
- On 28 November 2019, the Philippine Atmospheric, Geophysical and Astronomical Services Administration (PAGASA) announced that the storm internationally known as Kammuri had developed into a typhoon and entered the Philippine Area of Responsibility (PAR) on 30 November (when the Games' opening ceremony occurs), in which it would bear the local name Tisoy. Kammuri later made landfall in the province of Sorsogon on 2 December, which brought frequent heavy rains across Metro Manila and the regions of Central Luzon and Calabarzon, all of which are locales of the Games. PAGASA left the decision to cancel or postpone certain outdoor sports events of the Games to PHISGOC. Typhoon Kammuri exited the PAR by 5 December, according to PAGASA.
  - The mixed relay event in triathlon was rescheduled from December 4 to December 2.

== False news ==
Several reports on alleged mishaps in the days leading up to the official opening of the games were found to be misleading or false. The reports were slammed as "fake news" by critics of these reports, and the Congress of the Philippines vowed to summon the authors and propagators of these reports after the event. Some such news was critical of the Games, and some was in support of PHISGOC.

- According to a South China Morning Post article, the Muslim officials and athletes were reported to have been served non-halal food, prompting Juliana Seow, the Singaporean chef de mission, to write a formal complaint to the PHISGOC. This was later refuted by the Singapore National Olympic Council.
- The Philippine flag was claimed to be used as a table skirt in one of the venues by a retired journalist. The Philippine Sports Commission said they have looked into various venues of the games and concluded that the incident occurred at a different event. Two photos supposedly supporting the claim was posted on Facebook on November 25 with the poster making no reference to the Southeast Asian Games. The following day a former broadcast journalist posted the image with connecting the flag misuse to the games. The images were clarified by the original uploader to have been taken in 2015 with their friends in the United States.
- A picture showing the unfinished University of the Philippines Diliman Football Field was erroneously reported as the Biñan Football Stadium. The article was later corrected.
- A single cubicle in the Rizal Memorial Sports Complex' restroom was reported to have two toilets. It was first uploaded by ABS-CBN reporter Angel Movido on the Twitter. The photo was taken while the restroom was still being renovated.
- A viral post from a Facebook page claimed that the Rizal Memorial Stadium would not be part of the venues of the games, insinuating that since there were lapses in renovating the facility, it would not be used for the 2019 SEA Games. Parts of the stadium including a necessary scoreboard did remain unfinished during initial use (see Infrastructure and Logistics above), but the venue was in fact used throughout the Games.
- A viral post by the Philippine women's football team coach claimed that they were served kikiam, egg, and rice for breakfast. The hotel later clarified that it was part of a wider buffet and that the kikiam was actually chicken sausage. The hotel claimed in their statement that the coach has apologized to the hotel.
- According to PHISGOC chair and House Speaker Alan Peter Cayetano, they were awarded the "Best SEA Games Organizer" award from Sports Industry Asia (SPIA), a body that PHISGOC had endorsed as one of its sponsors. However, there is no such award and that the PHISGOC was actually awarded with the SPIA Asia Excellence Award. The Philippine News Agency's story on PHISGOC's winning of the award was based on press release sent by the PHISGOC.

== Judging ==
Malaysian gymnast Izzah Amzan scored identical score (15.200) with gold medalist Koi Sie Yan in the ribbon apparatus event on December 7, but Amzan was awarded a silver medal due to the judges deeming she performed a less difficult routine following tiebreaker rules set by the International Gymnastics Federation. The two gymnast were named joint gold medalists but this was revoked a day later which led to Malaysia filing a protest. The Philippines SEA Games Organising Committee (PHISGOC) has agreed to reinstate the ribbon event gold medal to Malaysian rhythmic gymnast Izzah Amzan after studying the technical regulations for the Games.
