= New Clark City Athletes Village =

Accommodation and support facility in the New Clark City Sports Hub

- The Government Residences (front) and the Athletes Village (left)
- Interactive map of the New Clark City Athletes Village area

General information
- Type: Accommodation
- Location: New Clark City, Capas, Tarlac, Philippines
- Coordinates: 15°20′35.5″N 120°32′05.6″E
- Completed: 2019
- Owner: Bases Conversion and Development Authority

Design and construction
- Architect: Budji + Royal Architecture + Design
- Main contractor: MTD Philippine

Website
- https://newclarkcity.ph/

The New Clark City Athletes' Village is an accommodation and support facility within the New Clark City Sports Hub located at the New Clark City in Capas, Tarlac, Philippines. It serves as the primary housing units for athletes, coaches, officials, and visiting organizations during trainings, sporting and entertainment events, and other major activities in the area. It is managed by the Bases Conversion and Development Authority (BCDA).

== History ==
The BCDA commissioned the local architecture firm Budji + Royal Architecture + Design for the design of the New Clark City Sports Hub, while construction was undertaken by MTD Philippines. The construction of the whole New Clark City Sports Hub, which also includes the Athletes Village, began on April 25, 2018, with a cement-pouring ceremony. By July 2019, the sports complex, including the Athletes Village was already available for use to Filipino athletes.

The Athletes Village served as the primary accommodation for athletes and officials during the athletics and aquatics events of the 2019 SEA Games. After the games, it continues to serve as the main accommodations for sporting and non-sporting events in New Clark City.

The Athletes Village served as one of the quarantine facilities in Central Luzon during the COVID-19 pandemic.

Since it started its operations, the students of the National Academy of Sports has used the Athletes' Village as their main quarters.

In December 2025, the BCDA and the Philippine Sports Commission (PSC) signed an agreement, allowing Filipino athletes access to the sports facilities, including the Athletes' Village.

== Facilities ==
The Athletes’ Village comprises 525 fully furnished housing units, each capable of accommodating up to three occupants. The complex includes a fitness center, computer room with an assembly area, outdoor swimming pool, outdoor basketball and volleyball courts, and laundry facilities, among others. The first- and second-floor rooms of the Athletes’ Village were designed to be accessible to persons with disabilities (PWDs), featuring elements such as sliding doors and wider bathrooms to accommodate wheelchair access.

A landscaped river park corridor is located adjacent to the Athletes’ Village, providing additional open space for leisure and recreation.

== Tenants ==
The Athletes’ Village is open to guests, especially for athletes, event organizers, and officials. It also serves as a temporary accommodation for the student athletes enrolled in the National Academy of Sports until its completion of its own dormitories. Following the partnership between BCDA and the PSC, Filipino national athletes have access to the accommodation in coordination with the former.

== See also ==
- New Clark City Athletics Stadium
- New Clark City Aquatics Center
- List of sporting events in New Clark City
