= Royal Pineda =

Filipino architect (born 1975)

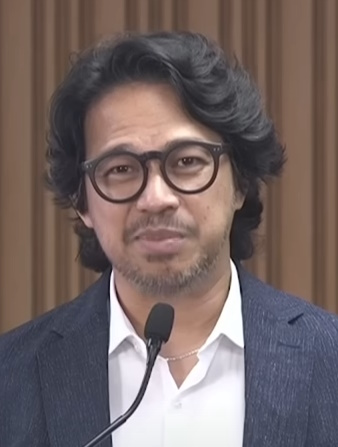
- Pineda in 2025
- Born: Royal Christopher Lopez Pineda; March 2, 1975 (age 51)
- Education: Polytechnic University of the Philippines
- Occupation: Architect
- Practice: Budji+Royal; RoyalPineda+
- Buildings: Clark International Airport Terminal 2
- Projects: New Clark City Sports Hub

Royal Christopher Lopez Pineda (born March 2, 1975) is a Filipino architect.

== Education ==
Royal Christopher Lopez Pineda obtained his bachelor's degree in architecture at the Polytechnic University of the Philippines. He was a beneficiary of the Japan–Philippines cooperation university program. Pineda has worked with Leandro Locsin who was recognized as a National Artist of the Philippines.

== Career ==
New Clark City Athletics Stadium

Pineda initially collaborated with Budji Layug to form the Budji + Royal Architecture + Design where he was a lead architect. Layug is an interior designer and landscaper known for incorporating Philippine indigenous materials in his design.

Pineda later went solo and formed Royal Pineda+ which advocated for "Filipino modern architecture" designs for its projects.

Among his notable projects are the Clark International Airport terminal 2 building, as well as the New Clark City Sports Hub, specifically its Athletics Stadium which was based on the Pinatubo volcano. He also made the Bangkota Philippines pavilion at the Expo 2020 in the United Arab Emirates from 2021 to 2022. He is also the consultant for the new Pasig City hall complex project launched during the administration of mayor Vico Sotto.

== Style and method ==
Royal Pineda is a proponent of Filipino modern architecture. He seeks to challenge the notion of Filipino architecture as being "temporary" as exhibited in the bahay kubo and the Spanish-influenced bahay na bato. He advocates for the usage of local materials along with non-Filipino elements which are most suitable in the Philippines' humid and tropical climate. Pineda coined the philosophy of "practical luxury" in 2010, which he surmise achieving "luxury by design at a reasonable cost" for a project in a developing country such as the Philippines using locally sourced materials.

== Personal life ==
Pineda's full name is Royal Christopher Pineda. The younger Pineda was given that name by his father Reynaldo (nicknamed Rey; meaning 'king') wanted his son to bare a royalty themed name. The elder Pineda decided against naming Royal as a "junior". He also hails from Pasig where he grew up.

== List of architectural works ==
Clark International Airport Terminal 2

- New Clark City Sports Hub (2018–19) in Capas, Tarlac
  - Athletics Stadium and Aquatic Center
- Clark International Airport Terminal 2 (2020) in Mabalacat, Pampanga
- Bangkota (2021–22) in Dubai, United Arab Emirates – for Expo 2020, Philippines pavilion
- Sacobia Bridge (2022) in Mabalacat, Pampanga
- SM City Laoag (2025) in Laoag, Ilocos Norte
