= New Clark City =

Central business district in Central Luzon, Philippines

- Planned community
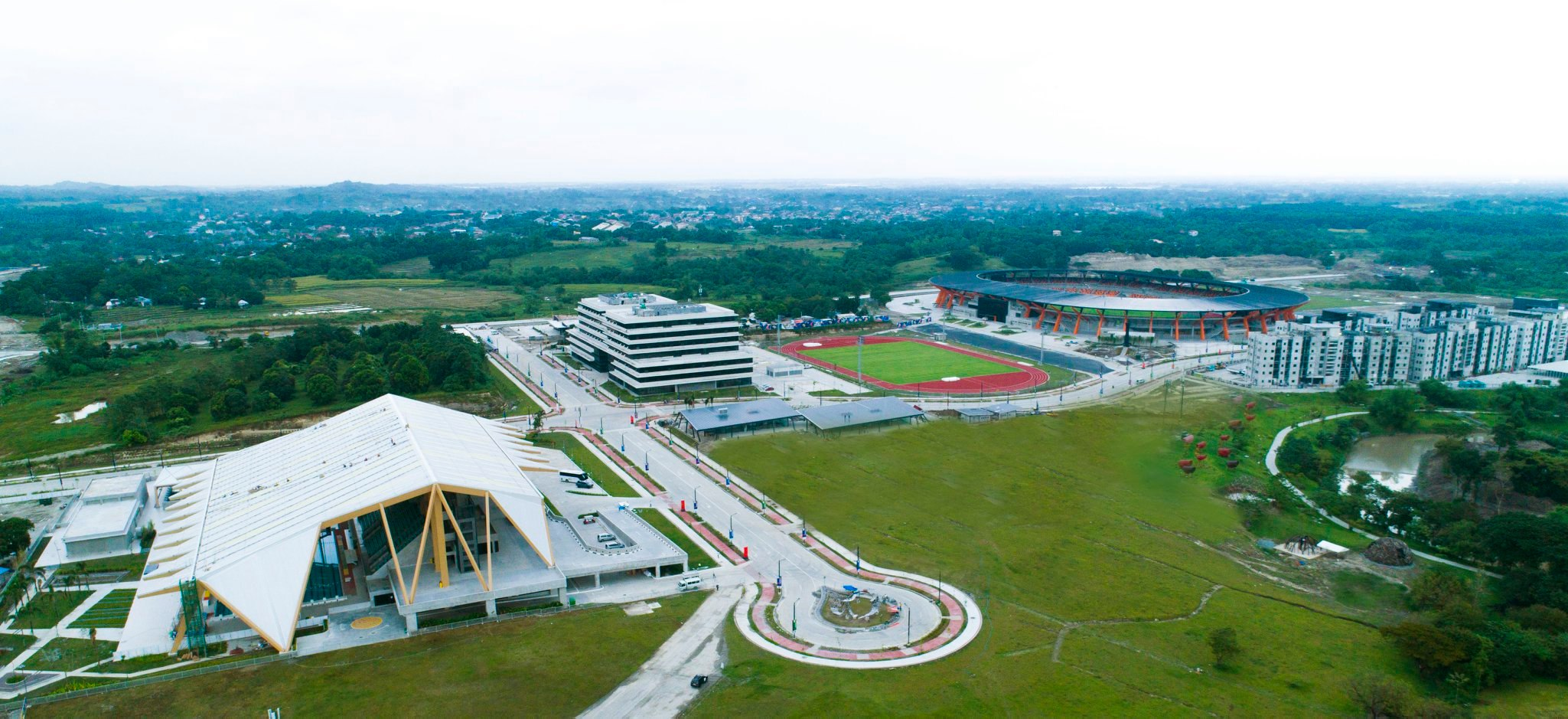
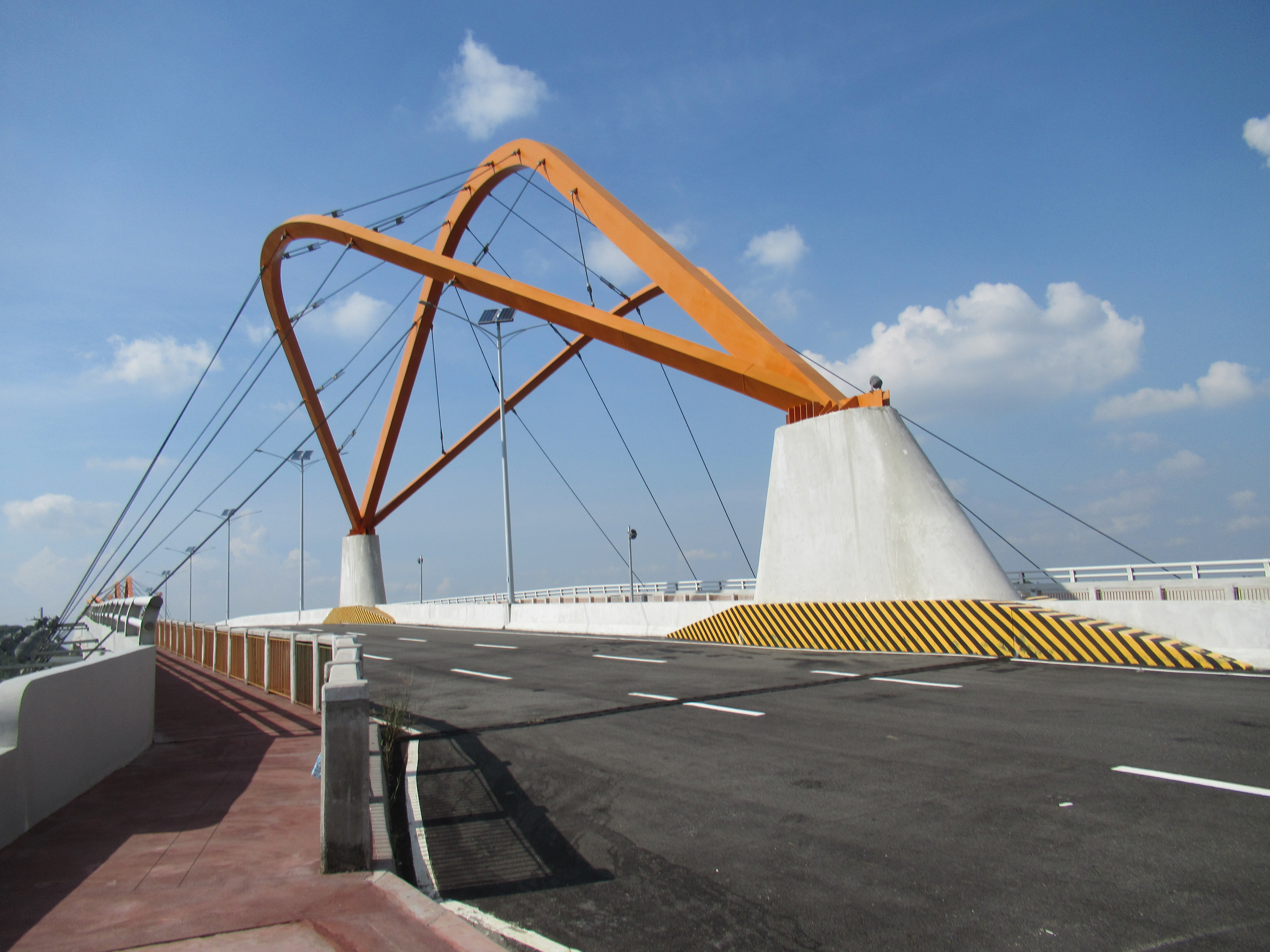
- Areal view of the National Government Administrative Center New Clark City Stadium Aquatic Center Athletes residence Sacobia Bridge

- Logo
- Interactive map of New Clark City
- Coordinates: 15°20′40″N 120°31′48″E
- Country: Philippines
- Region: Central Luzon
- Province: Tarlac
- Municipality: Bamban; Capas
- Economic zone: Clark Freeport and Special Economic Zone
- Managing entity: Bases Conversion and Development Authority
- Established: 11 April 2016; 10 years ago

Area
  - Total: 94.50 km^{2} (36.49 sq mi)
- Highest elevation: 800 m (2,600 ft)
- Lowest elevation: 54 m (177 ft)
- Time zone: UTC+8 (PST)
- Website: www.newclarkcity.ph

New Clark City is a planned community currently undergoing development. It is located within the Clark Freeport and Special Economic Zone in the municipalities of Bamban and Capas in Tarlac, Philippines, covering an area of approximately 9,450 hectares (23,400 acres) and is designed to accommodate up to 1.2 million people.

It is a planned city master planned by urban planning and engineering firms AECOM and Surbana Jurong, and is being developed by the Philippine state-enterprise Bases Conversion and Development Authority (BCDA). It was initiated in 2012 in a scheme to serve as an alternative to Metro Manila and establish a resilient, back-up administrative center for the national government. The city's master plan divides it into thirteen functional, sustainable neighborhoods, such as the National Government Administrative Center (the civic core of the city), an agro-industrial park, and academic districts, which are integrated closely with the surrounding natural landscape.

Although initially conceptualized as a new capital city for the Philippines, replacing Manila, the plan later evolved into the city being actively developed as a major hub for high technology and innovation in the region. A total area of 1,619 hectares (4,000 acres) was specifically allocated for artificial intelligence and advanced manufacturing since the accession of the Philippines to the Pax Silica initiative in 2026.

== History ==
=== Conceptualization and design ===
The idea of designing and building a new capital city for the Philippines has been around since the capital was reverted back to Manila in 1976. The most substantial plan, however, was proposed in 2012 by Arnel Paciano Casanova, who served as the president of BCDA, which manages former U.S. military installations in the country, until 2016. Casanova envisioned a new metropolis north of the current capital, within the former site of the U.S. military base of Camp O’Donnell, that would become the country’s first smart and green metropolis, as a substitute for Metro Manila, which faces challenges in congestion, lack of green spaces, and the effects of climate change. A notable aspect of the vision is the discouragement of gated communities, which are prevalent in Metro Manila.

The plan was met with skepticism from the public and some government officials, mostly due to its remote location and the displacement of indigenous people in the area. It was later highlighted by Typhoon Ketsana’s flooding of Metro Manila in 2009 and Typhoon Haiyan’s destruction of Tacloban City in 2013. This prompted the commissioning of the plan, with the national economic board chaired by President Benigno Aquino III approving the project in May 2014.

In 2015, proposals for the master conceptual development plan for the Clark Green City were submitted to the BCDA and screened by a committee composed of local and international urban planners, most notably Jezreel Apelar of Urban Land Institute, Julia Nebrija of World Bank, Grace Ramos of the University of the Philippines, Stephen Gray of Harvard University, Fadi Masoud of MIT, and Mary Anne Ocampo of international design firm Sasaki. AEDEA’s plan was selected.

In January 2016, the BCDA and Filinvest entered into a 50-year contract to develop the 288 hectares (710 acres) of allocated land in the city. During this time, the BCDA also secured partnerships with multinational firms such as the Japan Overseas Infrastructure Investment Corporation, which plans to connect the city to Metro Manila by rail, and the IVL Swedish Environmental Research Institute, which will assist the BCDA in the smart and disaster-resilient aspect of the plan. Philippine Congress approved House Resolution 116 in March 2016, in support of the Clark Green City, further strengthening the government's support for the project.

To build the human capital of the new city, the BCDA made a land grant of 70 hectares to the University of the Philippines, 40 to the Technological University of the Philippines, and 20 to the Philippine Science High School.

=== Ground breaking, 2019 SEA Games ===
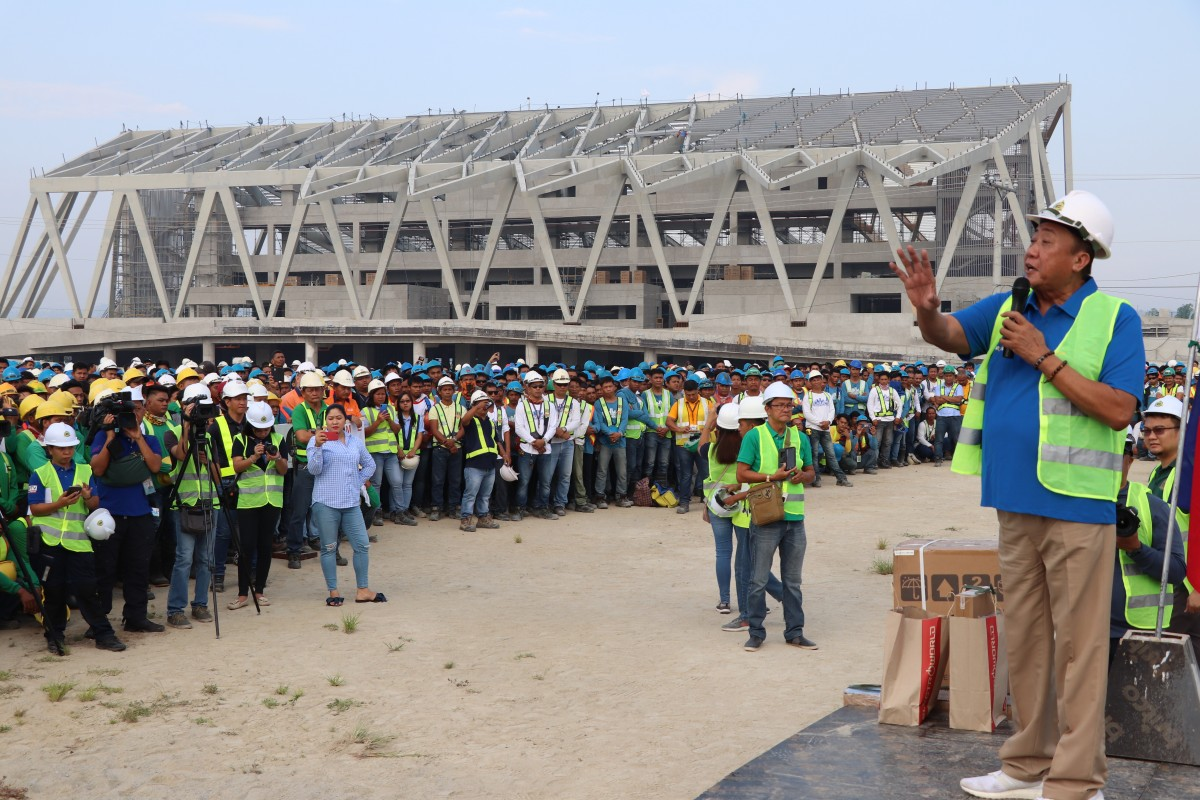
The Aquatic Center under construction, seen in the background in May 2019.

The groundbreaking of the city, supervised by President Aquino and Casanova, was held on April 11, 2016.

The development of the city was subsequently included in the flagship projects of the succeeding President Rodrigo Duterte, with Vince Dizon assuming the role of BCDA’s president. The project was renamed to its current name of New Clark City. The Phase 1-A construction began, which includes the government offices and accommodations of the National Government Administrative Center and its sports hub component. During the land acquisition in this phase, ahead of the 2019 SEA Games, the development faced opposition regarding the displacement of local indigenous Aeta communities. Organizations in Capas like Asosasyon ng Katutubong Mahawang argued that ancestral lands were affected, while the BCDA cited the lack of a Certificate of Ancestral Domain Title (CADT) and offered financial compensation of ₱30 per square meter, stating no forcible demolitions took place. In December 2019, Senator Risa Hontiveros filed a Senate resolution to investigate the eviction, stating "There is a need to ensure the protection of Aetas and other indigenous communities from unjust expulsion from a land that has served as their home and have tilled since time immemorial". The New Clark City Stadium and the Aquatic Center were completed in a record time of 18 months, just in time for the games.

In February 2020, as one of the preemptive measure implemented by the national government at the start of the COVID-19 pandemic, the city was designated as a quarantine zone for repatriated Filipinos returning from Hubei, China, with the athletes village used during SEA Games serving as the billeting quarters.

In July 2020, the Department of Agriculture unveiled plans to set up an agro-industrial hub in the city, aimed at supporting farming communities in the region and strengthening food security in Luzon.

The Global Future Cities Program of the British government noted issues in the city’s plan, including the absence of provision for affordable housing, the indefinite integration of the existing community of farmers in the area into the development, and the current urban design lacking appropriate streetscape design. In September 2020, the BCDA and the British government signed a memorandum of agreement to include the city in the program and tackle the issues raised. A ceremony for the foundation of the city’s central park, a notable output of the program, was held in July 2021.

=== High technology development ===
The Philippines is one of the major source and exporter of raw mineral exports like nickel and copper. 98% of China's imports are from the Philippines, according to a 2014 Financial Times report. The Philippine government initially proposed a ban on raw mineral exports in 2014 through 2030, but the plan was eventually scrapped.

In April 2026, 1,619 hectares (4,000 acres) of land in the city were allocated for a high technology hub aligned with the Pax Silica initiative. Designed for artificial intelligence infrastructure, semiconductor processing, and advanced manufacturing, the designated zone aims to expand domestic mineral processing into high-value electronics production, with Taiwanese manufacturer Foxconn, one of the manufacturers of iPhone, identified as a prospective anchor locator. To support the city's power and digital connectivity demands, the BCDA partnered with private firms in late 2026 to study the feasibility of a 40-megawatt liquefied natural gas (LNG) power plant and a common underground ICT passive infrastructure network.

== Geography ==
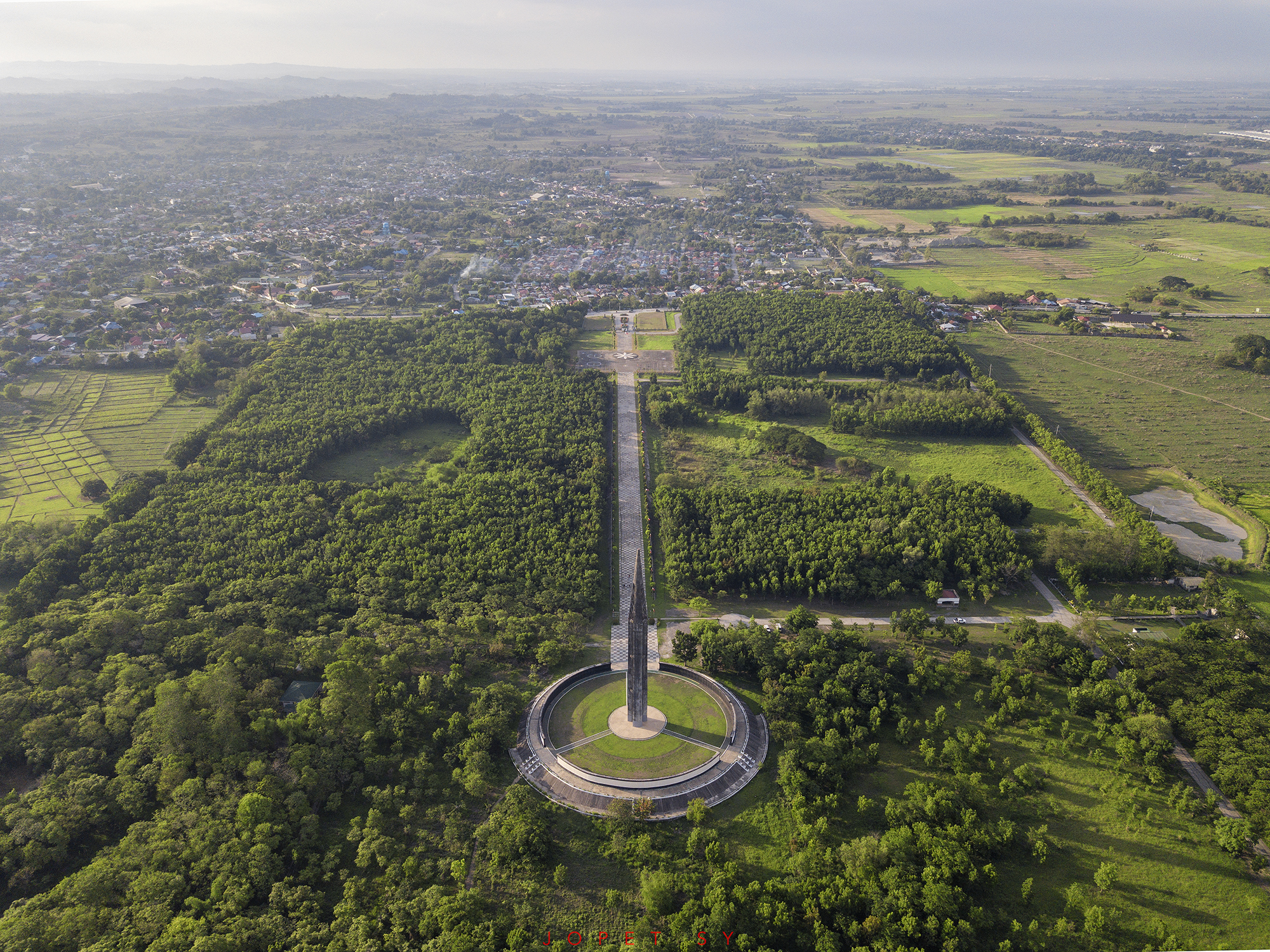
Capas National Shrine at the entrance to New Clark City

New Clark City spans an area of 9,450 hectares (23,400 acres) and is located within the former U.S. military base of Camp O'Donnell. Being part of the Clark Special Economic Zone, New Clark City is administered from Angeles City in the province of Pampanga, although the development encompasses parts of the municipalities of Capas and Bamban in the bordering province of Tarlac.

The area was specifically chosen for the development due to its lower risk of natural disasters. With a minimum elevation of 54 metres (177 ft) above sea level and a maximum of around 800 metres (2,600 ft), and complemented by a planned central park which will serve as a flood catchment basin, the site is considered not to be a flood-prone area. The development is also surrounded by the mountain ranges of Sierra Madre to the east and Zambales Mountains to the west, providing natural protection in times of typhoons. The Philippine Institute of Volcanology and Seismology has also assessed the area to be relatively less prone to earthquakes.

=== Zoning ===
About 6,000 hectares (15,000 acres) of the total 9,450 hectares (23,400 acres), or about 60% of the total land area of the city will be developed as green space. The river park system is currently under development, in addition to the World War II and Bataan Death March memorial, the Capas National Shrine, located at the entrance of the city, and the planned 44 hectares (110 acres) Central Park at the center of the city, which is set to become one of the largest public parks in the country.

Key development areas in New Clark City
Area	Allocation	Planned facilities	Status
National Government Administrative Center	200 ha (490 acres)	Mixed-use development for facilities and offices by the national government. It includes: Satellite office of the President of the Philippines; Integrated Operations and Disaster Recovery Center; National Sports Hub which includes: New Clark City Stadium; New Clark City Aquatic Center; An indoor arena	Completed
Filinvest Innovation Park	288 ha (710 acres)	Mixed-use and industrial district being developed under joint venture between BCDA and Filinvest Land.: Innovation Park for logistics, e-commerce, light manufacturing, and data center operations businesses. Includes: StB Giga Factory, the first Lithium iron phosphate battery manufacturing plant in the country; EDAC Southeast Asia hub	Under development
Hann Reserve	450 ha (1,100 acres)	A mountain resort being developed by Hann Development Corporation, Accor, and Marriott International. It will contain: A 18-hole championship golf course; PGA-affiliated player development center; Hotels by Banyan Tree, Angsana, Sofitel, Emblems, The Luxury Collection, and The Westin; Mixed-use commercial center; 10 hectares (25 acres) public park	Under development
Science Park	100 ha (250 acres)	Partnership between the BCDA and Science Park of the Philippines Inc.	Planned
Advanced manufacturing park	1,600 ha (4,000 acres)	Locators site for the Philippine government and the U.S. government-led Pax Silica initiative	Planned
Others	10 ha (25 acres)	PhilTA's Philippine Tennis Center	Planned

=== Climate ===
Under the Köppen-Geiger classification, New Clark City has a tropical monsoon climate (Am). In May, the warmest month, the average temperature reaches up to 28.2 °C (82.8 °F); in January, the coldest month, the average temperature is 24.1 °C (75.4 °F). January also sees precipitation level plunging to 31 mm, making the city arid during this month, in contrast to July, when precipitation reaches its peak at an average of 353 mm.

Climate data for New Clark City (1991–2021 temperature, precipitation/rainfall, humidity, rainy days; 1999–2019 sunshine hours)
Month	Jan	Feb	Mar	Apr	May	Jun	Jul	Aug	Sep	Oct	Nov	Dec	Year
Mean daily maximum °C (°F)	28.7 (83.7)	29.7 (85.5)	31.4 (88.5)	33.4 (92.1)	32.9 (91.2)	34.4 (93.9)	29.8 (85.6)	29.6 (85.3)	29.7 (85.5)	29.7 (85.5)	29.6 (85.3)	28.9 (84.0)	30.7 (87.2)
Daily mean °C (°F)	24.1 (75.4)	24.8 (76.6)	26.3 (79.3)	28.2 (82.8)	28.2 (82.8)	27.2 (81.0)	26.5 (79.7)	26.3 (79.3)	26.2 (79.2)	26 (79)	25.7 (78.3)	24.8 (76.6)	26.2 (79.2)
Mean daily minimum °C (°F)	20.2 (68.4)	20.7 (69.3)	22.1 (71.8)	24 (75)	24.9 (76.8)	24.4 (75.9)	24.1 (75.4)	24 (75)	23.7 (74.7)	23 (73)	22.3 (72.1)	21.3 (70.3)	22.9 (73.1)
Average precipitation mm (inches)	31 (1.2)	31 (1.2)	47 (1.9)	51 (2.0)	177 (7.0)	232 (9.1)	353 (13.9)	317 (12.5)	302 (11.9)	184 (7.2)	98 (3.9)	79 (3.1)	1,902 (74.9)
Average precipitation days	5	4	6	8	16	19	21	21	20	15	10	7	152
Average relative humidity (%)	75	73	70	68	74	82	85	86	86	83	80	78	78
Mean daily sunshine hours	7.4	7.5	8.3	9.1	9.0	8.5	8.0	7.4	7.6	8.1	8.2	7.7	8.1
Source: Climate-Data.org

== Education ==
The newly established National Academy of Sports is home to the top Filipino student-athletes training in different sports programs.

Education and research have been core aspects of the city's development since its conceptualization. The city is being developed to introduce the Philippine education sector and workforce in general to global standards, which will ultimately complement the technology companies locating in the city.

The zoning plan of New Clark City includes areas designated for institutional and educational purposes. The first locator in the education sector was approved in 2014, with the country's top state research university, the University of the Philippines, seeking to establish a new campus in the city to internationalize its curriculum and research program. Other universities set to open campuses in the city include the Technological University of the Philippines.

New Clark City also hosts two specialized basic education institutions: the National Academy of Sports was established in the city in 2020, while the Philippine Science High School is set to open a new campus and a large-scale fabrication laboratory in the city. Hann Philippines is also set to open an international school offering the International Baccalaureate program.

The city is also set to be home to various national research institutes, with the Virology and Vaccine Institute of the Philippines by the Department of Science and Technology, an agro-industrial hub and the National Seed Technology Park by the Department of Agriculture, and the Philippine Space Agency headquarters, all under construction, in addition to the Philippine General Hospital Polyclinic which is now operational under the University of the Philippines.

== Sports ==
The New Clark City Athletics Stadium.

New Clark City hosted the 2019 SEA Games in its sports hub, which was completed in a record time of 18 months, just in time for the games. The athletics events and the closing ceremony were held at the New Clark City Stadium, while the diving, swimming, and water polo events were held at the New Clark City Aquatic Center. Athletes with events located in the Clark cluster were billeted at the athletes' village in NGAC. The 2020 ASEAN Para Games and the 2020 Asian Swimming Championships were also slated to be held in the city before being cancelled because of the COVID-19 pandemic. Instead, the Aquatic Center hosted the 11th Asian Age Group Aquatics Championships in 2024. The sports hub serves as an official training center for national athletes, as well as for student-athletes of the National Academy of Sports, which was established in the location in 2020, having year-round access to the sports facilities.

The New Clark City Stadium is one of the home stadiums of the Philippine national football team, playing the Maldives on March 25, 2025, in their first home game in the stadium. Since 2021, Pampanga has been the home locality of United City F.C., which competes at the Philippines Football League, with the New Clark City Stadium as its home ground. Aside from football, the stadium also serves as a primary training and development hub for the Philippine national rugby teams, conducting regular training camps and community clinics at the stadium.

Two of the country's biggest collegiate leagues, the UAAP and the NCAA, hold their events in the New Clark City sports hub. The swimming and the track and field events of UAAP are held in the sports hub annually every October and November, while the track and field championships of NCAA are held at the stadium in May.

A pass through or stop in New Clark City has become a regular fixture of the historic Tour of Luzon since the opening of the city to the public in 2019. For the 2026 edition, New Clark City was the endpoint of stage two and the starting point of stage three, going to Palayan in Nueva Ecija. The 10-hectare Philippine Tennis Center will be constructed in the city by the Philippine Tennis Association. The Philippine Olympic Committee will also construct an Olympic museum at New Clark City.

== Infrastructure ==
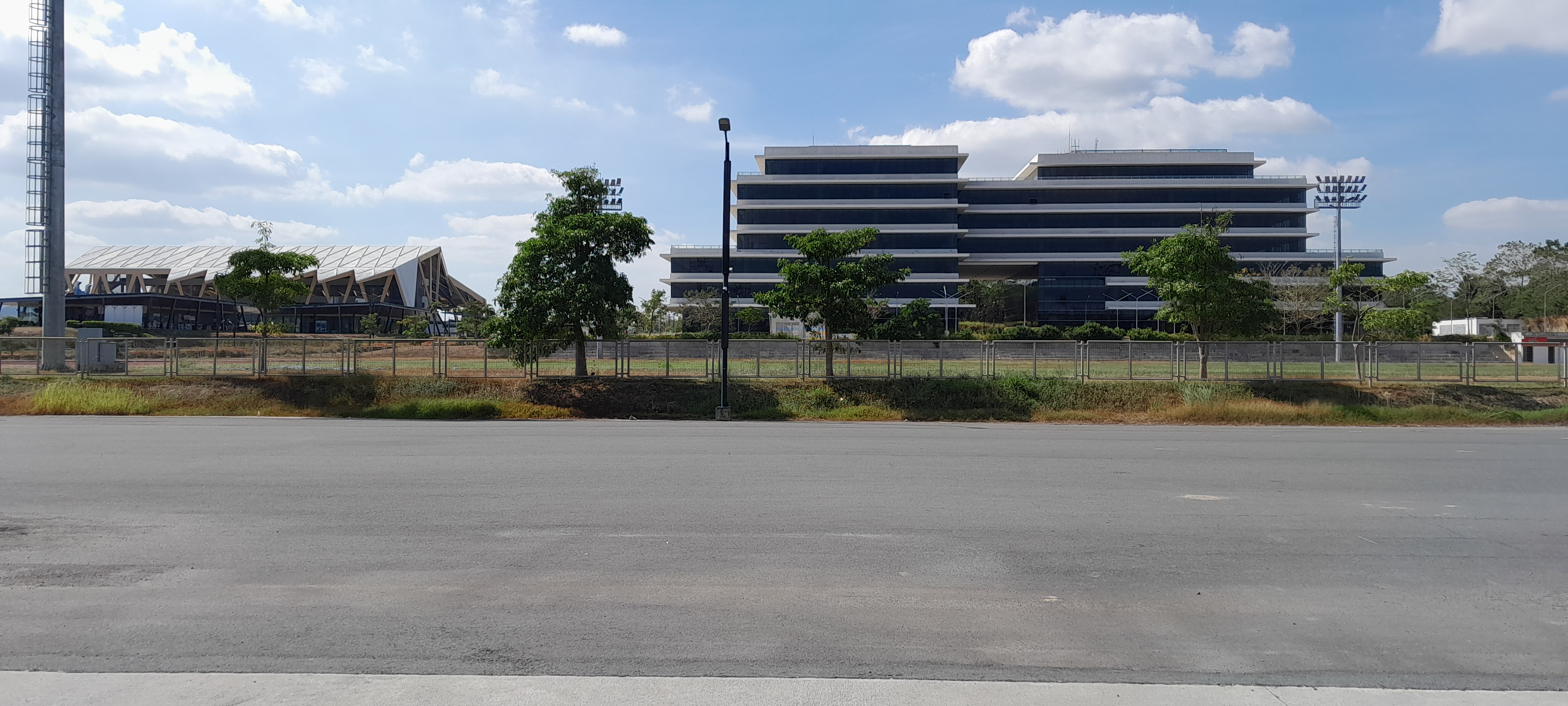
The National Government Administrative Center at New Clark City, with the New Clark City Aquatic Center at left

=== Government ===
Bangko Sentral ng Pilipinas is currently constructing a new campus in New Clark City which will contain a new currency production facility. The 31.1 ha (77 acres) campus is expected to open by 2028.

A regional office and judiciary center for the National Bureau of Investigation and the Supreme Court, respectively, will be constructed in the city.

The Philippine Air Force has also broken ground for a facility within the city.

=== Transportation ===
New Clark City is connected to other areas in the Clark Freeport and Special Economic Zone through the Clark Loop, a bus rapid transit system serving the city, the Clark International Airport, and other developments in the economic zone. It was opened in time for the 30th Southeast Asian Games.

The North–South Commuter Railway of the Philippine National Railways will connect the city to Metro Manila through the future New Clark City station.

New Clark will also be served by the Subic–Clark–Tarlac Expressway and Central Luzon Link Expressway specifically through the 6.98 km (4.34 mi) six-lane access road which will connect the city to the greater MacArthur Highway. One major access point to the city is the Sacobia Bridge in Mabalacat City, Pampanga. The structure crosses over the Sacobia River, and is part of the One Clark Boulevard which connects New Clark with the rest of the Clark Freeport Zone. The North Luzon Expressway has an access to this city via SCTEX.

In 2023, the BCDA signed a memorandum of agreement with Japan-based Zenmov, Inc. and Philippine-based MC Metro Transport Operation, Inc. for a demonstration of an energy-efficient and smart public transportation system that will run within New Clark City, Capas, Tarlac and the rest of Clark Special Economic Zone. In September, 2024, the country's first smart autonomous self-driving bus which uses Smart mobility Operation Cloud was launched in the city. It will run thereat, Clark Freeport Zone and Clark International Airport.

=== Utilities ===
One notable feature of New Clark City is its underground utility corridor, which, unlike most Philippine cities with overhead lines, utilizes a common underground service channel for power, water, and telecommunications. This design improves resilience against disasters, streamlines maintenance without road excavations, and preserves the city's aesthetic overall.

For the electricity, the power distribution is managed by a consortium comprising Meralco and the Japanese firm Marubeni Corporation. The city also operates on the Philippines' first fully "smart" power grid, a system that utilizes real-time energy consumption monitoring to improve reliability for locators. The National Grid Corporation of the Philippines is also constructing the Capas substation, providing a dedicated power connection to support the industrial hubs of the city. BCDA has also allocated 37 hectares for a large-scale solar farm, while a waste-to-energy plant capable of processing 600 metric tons of solid waste daily and generating 12 MW of power is currently under construction. Meanwhile, the water and wastewater services of the city are provided by a consortium led by PrimeWater and managed by K-Water.

New Clark City also employs an open-access fiber model for its internet infrastructure, meaning the BCDA builds and maintains the passive infrastructure and leases it to multiple internet service providers to get the most competitive retail for residents and businesses, as well as to avoid redundant construction.

== See also ==
- List of sporting events in New Clark City
- Clark Freeport and Special Economic Zone
  - Clark Global City
  - Clark International Airport
- Camp O'Donnell, Capas, Tarlac
- Bonifacio Global City – flagship project of BCDA
