= 2019 SEA Games cauldron =

Structure in Capas, Tarlac, Philippines

2019 Southeast Asian Games cauldron
- Location: New Clark City Sports Hub, Capas, Tarlac, Philippines
- Designer: Francisco Mañosa
- Height: 12.5 meters (41 ft)
- Completion date: 2019
- Dedicated to: 2019 Southeast Asian Games

The 2019 Southeast Asian Games cauldron is a structure at the New Clark City Athletic Stadium in Capas, Tarlac, Philippines and was made for the 30th Southeast Asian Games with National Artist Francisco Mañosa responsible for the design. It was lit for the Opening Ceremony of the regional games which was held at the Philippine Arena in Bocaue, Bulacan.

== Design ==
The cauldron.

The 2019 Southeast Asian Games cauldron including its backdrop and podium was designed by Mañosa & Co. Inc. (MCI) of Filipino architect and National Artist Francisco Mañosa. Mañosa himself was involved in the design process despite him already in poor health and in early stages of dementia when his family firm was approached by the Philippine Southeast Asian Games Organizing Committee (PHISGOC) in January 2019 to design a cauldron for the games. Despite unable to draw by that time, Mañosa was able to give direction regarding the design of the cauldron verbally. The architect viewed videos of Olympic cauldron on YouTube as part of the design process and concluded that the 2019 Southeast Asian Games cauldron "must be Filipino" and directed his firm to look into his original design for the unbuilt Centennial Tower which was inspired from the sulo, a traditional Filipino torch. MCI presented two other designs to the PHISGOC. PHISGOC selected the design which was made by Mañosa himself. MCI did not disclose which among the three proposals were made by Mañosa beforehand.

The cauldron's design consists of the following:

- Three main pillars which represents the Philippines' main island groupings; Luzon, Visayas, and Mindanao
- 17 sub-pillars for the 17 regions of the country
- 11 segments in the tower and 11 steps on the podium for the 11 countries participating at the 2019 Southeast Asian Games.

The cauldron was originally planned to be 32 meters (105 ft) high so that the flame would be visible from inside the Athletics Stadium but the planned height was reduced to 12.5 meters (41 ft). The cauldron was elevated by a podium. A foreign company was responsible for cauldron the flame mechanism.

== Construction ==
MCI supervised the construction of the cauldron ensuring that its design for the structure was followed. Different firms were contracted for the construction of the podium, the fabrication of the tower, and the cauldron itself.

== Cost ==
The Philippine Southeast Asian Games Organizing Committee (PHISGOC) requested a budget of ₱55.92 million for the cauldron from the Philippine Sports Commission, which handled the ₱6 billion fund provided by the national government for the organization of the 2019 Southeast Asian Games. The breakdown of the budget for the cauldron is as follows:

- ₱4.4 million – design
- ₱13.44 million – foundation construction
- ₱32 million – construction and installation of the cauldron itself
- ₱6 million – wrist tags

In the days leading to the 2019 Southeast Asian Games, the construction of the cauldron was met with criticism due to its cost. Senator Franklin Drilon pejoratively called the cauldron a kaldero (lit. 'cooking cauldron, in Filipino') questioning the cost of the structure saying the money spent for it could have been used to build 50 classrooms. House Speaker Alan Peter Cayetano, who is also the chairman of the organizing committee of the games, defended the cauldron as "priceless work of art" and pointed out that the cauldron used in the 2015 Southeast Asian Games in Singapore was more expensive at ₱63 million. President Rodrigo Duterte expressed belief that there was no corruption involved in building the cauldron. The Office of the Ombudsman said it had created a fact-finding panel to probe the possibility of corruption.

In September 2021, Cayetano said that the cauldron was wholly funded by the private sector adding that corruption allegations regarding the cauldron caused some sponsors of the games to withdraw.

== Use ==
The cauldron at night during the biennial games

The cauldron was lit up for the opening ceremony of the 2019 Southeast Asian Games at the Philippine Arena in Bocaue. A live video of the lighting was to be supposed to beamed at the indoor arena during the ceremony but a pre-recorded video of the act by boxers Manny Pacquiao and Nesthy Petecio was shown instead as a contingency against anticipated bad weather expected from the then-incoming onslaught of Typhoon Kammuri (Tisoy). The fire in the cauldron was extinguished after Salvador Medialdea declared the games closed during the closing ceremony of the games which was held at the New Clark City Sports Hub itself.
