= New Clark City Athletics Stadium =

Stadium in Capas, Tarlac, Philippines

- Aerial view
- Interactive map of New Clark City Athletics Stadium
- Location: New Clark City, Capas, Tarlac, Philippines
- Coordinates: 15°20′44″N 120°32′1″E
- Owner: Bases Conversion and Development Authority
- Capacity: 20,000 (seated)
- Surface: Grass
- Scoreboard: Yes
- Field size: 105 m × 68 m (344 ft × 223 ft)
- Acreage: 25,000 m^{2} (270,000 sq ft)

Construction
- Groundbreaking: 2018
- Built: 2019
- Cost: ₱4 billion
- Architect: Budji+Royal
- Main contractor: MTD Philippines

Tenants
- Philippines national football team (2025–present); United City (2021–2023)

The New Clark City Athletics Stadium, also referred to as the New Clark Stadium, is a multi-purpose stadium located at the New Clark City in Capas, Tarlac, Philippines. It is the primary venue of the New Clark City Sports Hub, which is part of the National Government Administrative Center. It hosted the athletics events and the closing ceremony of the 2019 Southeast Asian Games.

== Construction ==
The construction of the whole New Clark City Sports Hub, which also includes the Athletics Stadium, began on April 25, 2018, with a cement-pouring ceremony. The cost of the stadium including the nearby training track oval and a field for throwing sports costed around ₱4 billion. By early July 2019, the stadium is already 98 percent complete and the track oval was already available for use to Filipino athletes.

With the stadium almost complete by September 1, 2019, the first event held in the stadium was the final leg of the Philippine Athletics Track and Field Association weekly relay, a qualifier for athletes aspiring to represent the Philippines at the 2019 Southeast Asian Games, on that day. The construction of the stadium was finished on October 12, 2019, or 50 days ahead of the opening of the 2019 Southeast Asian Games.

== Architecture and design ==
Local architecture firm, Budji + Royal Architecture + Design, were commissioned by the Bases Conversion Development Authority to work on the New Clark City Sports Hub. This was the first time that Budji + Royal Architecture + Design has worked on a sports facility project. The team referred to the technical guidelines set by the International Association of Athletics Federations for the athletics stadium.

The Athletics Stadium itself had its design derived from Mount Pinatubo, with its posts and facade made from lahar or volcanic debris from the volcano. Its ringed roofline was made to resemble a crater and be defined by a series of curving canopies. The main facade or the main entrance was ornated with glass frames. and its pillars are painted orange to represent the local sunset. The shade of the anti-corrosive paint, provided by Norwegian firm Jotun, is patented and is branded as "B+R Active Orange". The pillars, inspired by the framework of the parol, support the seating structure of the stadium as well as its roofing.

The stadium has an open-shed architecture and a raised roofline as a remedy against the tropical and humid climate of its locale. The structure is further ventilated by wind tunnels and its insulated oval roof. There are no pillars obstructing the view towards the center of the stadium from its seating area; lights are hung on the catwalk of its canopy.

Lead architect Royal Pineda described his approach in designing the stadium and the rest of the sports complex as a "practical luxury", a deviation from relying on expensive materials to come up with an elegant result. The open ceiling allows the installation of additional utilities without dismantling the stadium's ceiling board or doing any repainting works. The structural frames and lahar concrete were deliberately left unpainted for easy maintenance. The stadium and surrounding facilities are also engineered to resist earthquakes of up to 8.9 magnitude. The concept of "practical luxury" is also described as maximizing the facility's usable space.

The Athletics Stadium was nominated for the Jury Award of Stadium of the Year 2019 of StadiumDB.com, an online database for stadiums. The New Clark City stadium was among the ten shortlisted stadiums being considered for the award. The stadium was also nominated for the Engineering Prize and the Sport Completed Building category award for the 2021 edition of the World Architecture Festival (WAF)

== Facilities ==
Interior of the stadium

The stadium, which has a footprint of 25,000 m^{2} (270,000 sq ft), has a seating capacity for 20,000 people and has 21 rows of seats.

It is graded as a Class 1A Athletics Facility certified by the International Association of Athletics Federations, the first athletics facility in the Philippines to be so. The stadium also hosts a 400 m (1,300 ft) nine-lane standard athletics oval The rubberized track was provided by Polytan. The stadium also has radio receivers installed that would allow the measuring of athletes performing in the venue through RFID timing. An outdoor track nearby the stadium used for warm-up is also equipped with the same technology.

It also has a football field of natural grass.

A warm-up area is also hosted in the stadium which has equipment provided by Technogym and an indoor rubber track also provided by Polytan.

== Use ==
The stadium can be used to host various sporting events, primarily athletics and association football, as well as entertainment events, such as concerts. It hosted the closing ceremony of the 2019 Southeast Asian Games, and also the home stadium of the United City Football Club.

=== Football ===
National team matches

Date	Team #1	Result	Team #2	Tournament	Round	Spectators
March 25, 2025	Philippines	4–1	Maldives	2027 AFC Asian Cup qualification	Third round	3,334
June 10, 2025	Philippines	2–2	Tajikistan	2027 AFC Asian Cup qualification	Third round	10,854
October 14, 2025	Philippines	3–1	Timor-Leste	2027 AFC Asian Cup qualification	Third round	10,034
July 24, 2026	Philippines	1–4	Myanmar	2026 ASEAN Championship	Group B	3,104
August 3, 2026	Philippines	0–1	Thailand	2026 ASEAN Championship	Group B	2,786

Club matches

Date	Team #1	Result	Team #2	Tournament	Round	Spectators
September 18, 2025	Kaya–Iloilo	0–3	Tampines Rovers	2025–26 AFC Champions League Two	Group H	120
October 23, 2025	Kaya–Iloilo	0–3	BG Pathum United	2025–26 AFC Champions League Two	Group H	422
December 11, 2025	Kaya–Iloilo	0–1	Pohang Steelers	2025–26 AFC Champions League Two	Group H	659

=== Concerts ===
The stadium hosted its first headline concert on February 3, 2024, with the South Korean boy group Enhypen's Fate Tour.

== Gallery ==
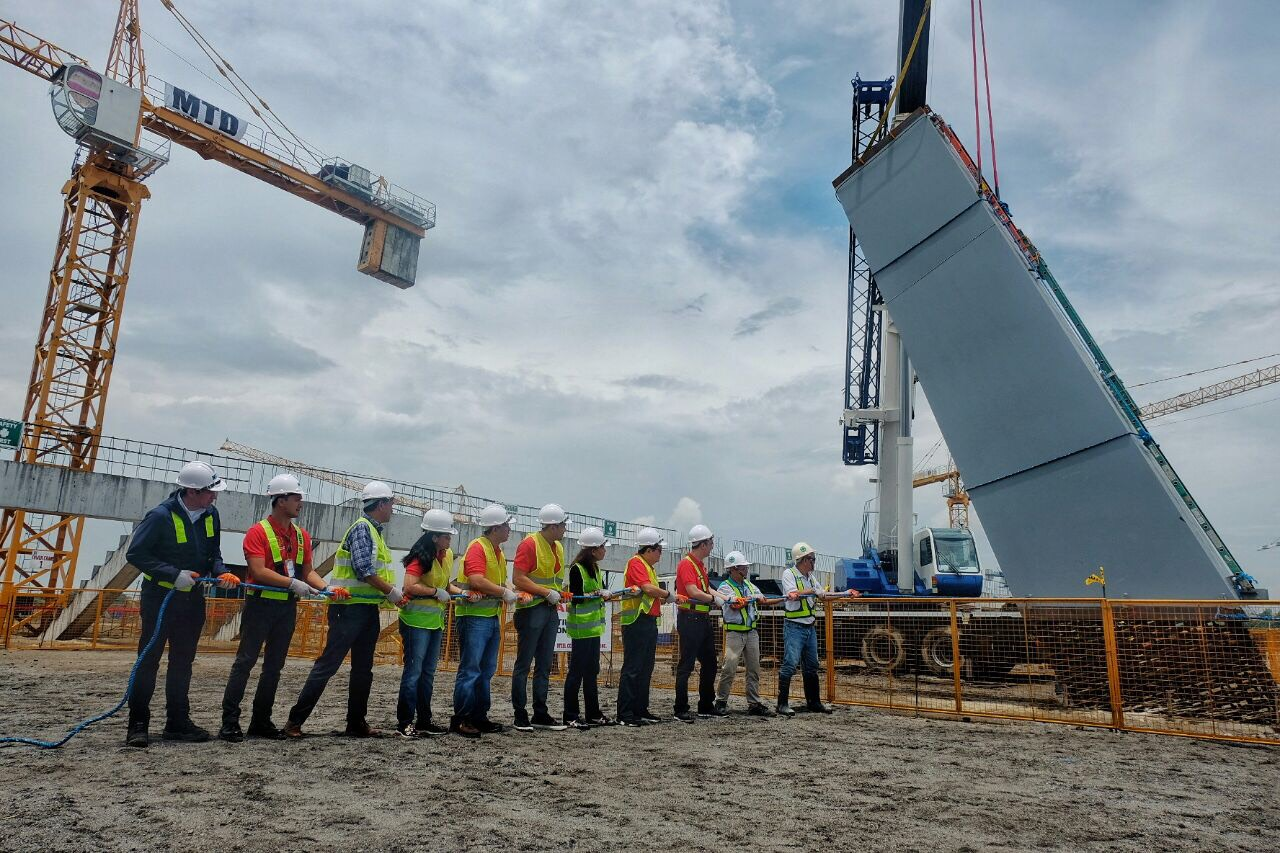
Installation of the composite columns of the athletics stadium (July 2018)

The stadium during its construction (March 2019)

The stadium during its construction (July 2019)

Aerial view of New Clark City Sports Hub

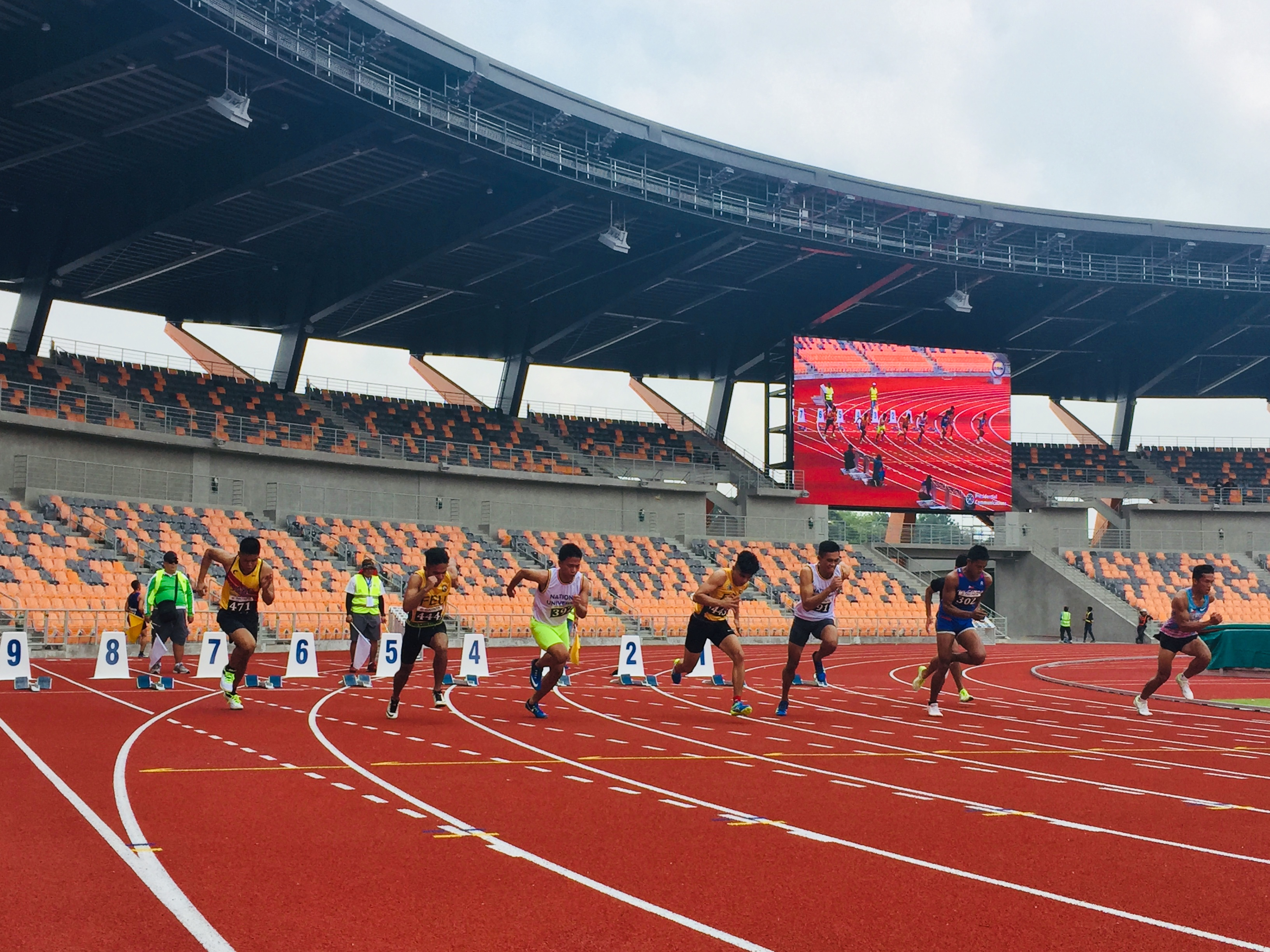
Final leg of the PATAFA weekly relay held at the athletics stadium (September 1, 2019)

The athletic stadium with the training track oval in the foreground.

Close-up of the south entrance

Back side view

VIP entrance

Athletics track

Grass field at the center of the stadium (with the Capas National Shrine seen on the background)

South side seats

Track and field

The 2019 Southeast Asian Games cauldron

The cauldron at night

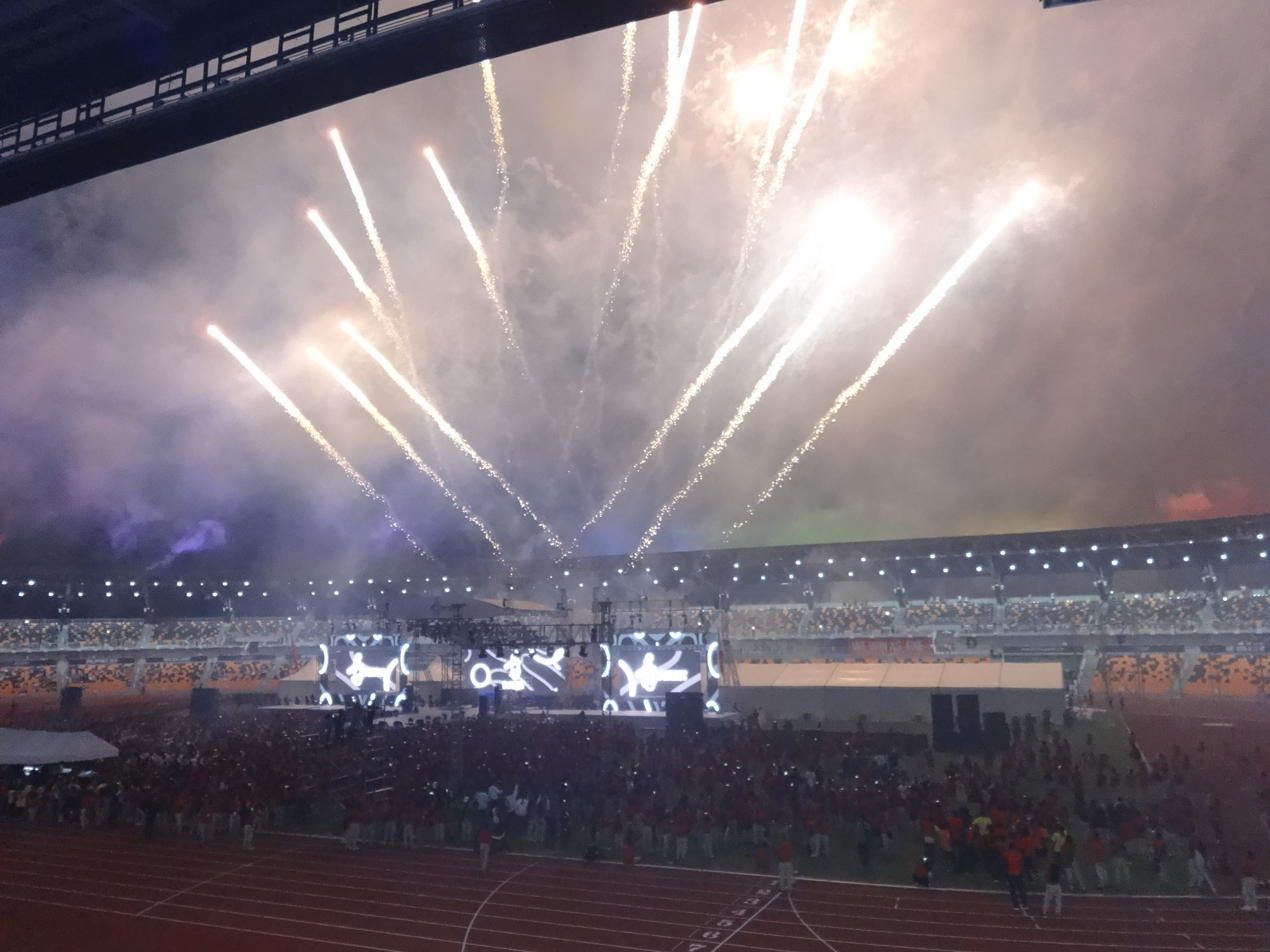
Fireworks display during the closing ceremony of the 2019 SEA Games

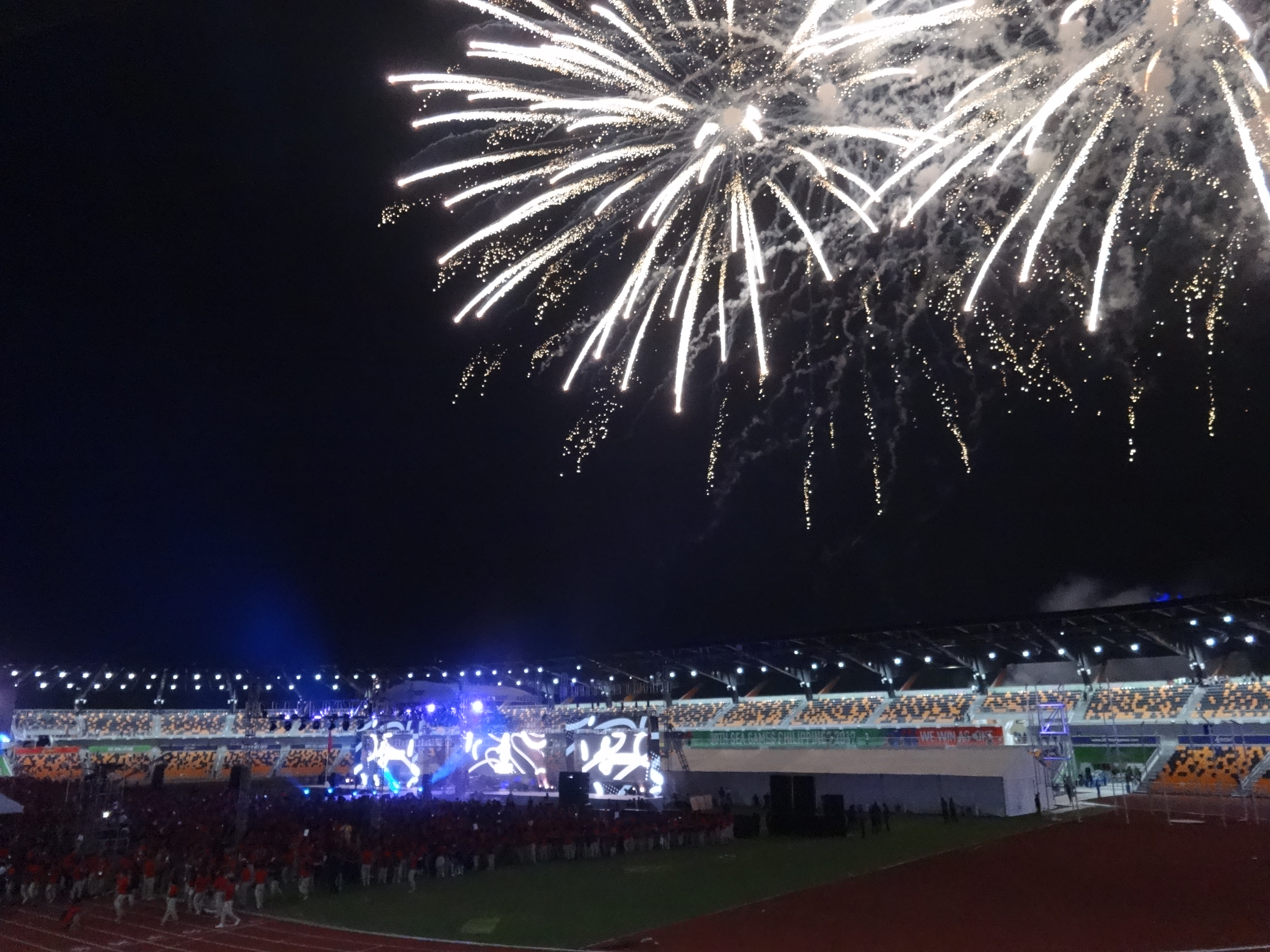
Fireworks after Black Eyed Peas' concert at the 2019 SEA Games closing ceremony

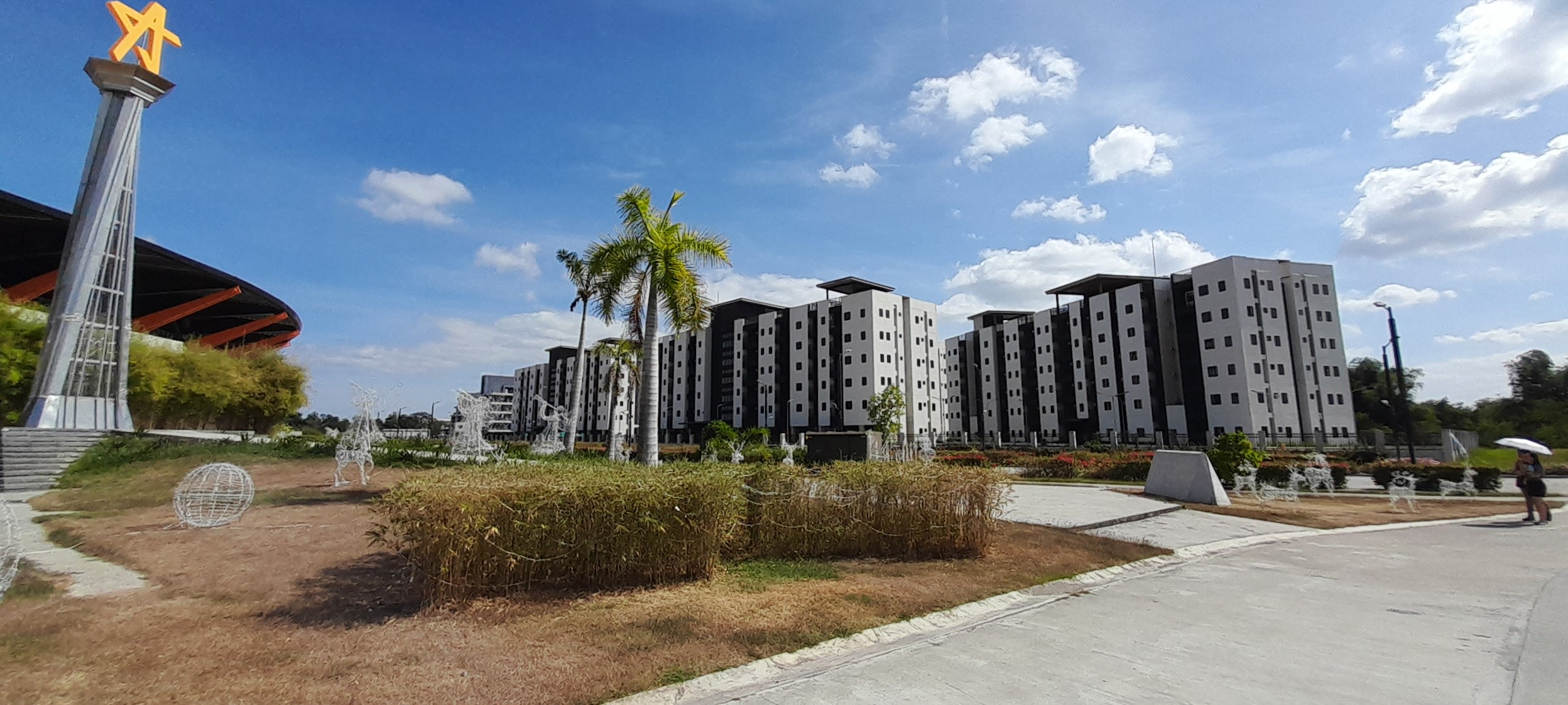
The Residences Condo, beside the stadium

== See also ==
- List of football stadiums in the Philippines
- New Clark City Aquatics Center
- Philippine Sports Stadium
- Rizal Memorial Stadium
- Panaad Stadium
- Biñan Football Stadium
- PFF National Training Center
