= New Clark City Aquatic Center =

Swimming and diving venue in Capas, Philippines

Coordinates: 15°20′44″N 120°32′1″E

- Interactive map of New Clark City Aquatic Center
- Location: New Clark City, Capas, Tarlac, Philippines
- Owner: Bases Conversion and Development Authority
- Capacity: 2,000 total 1,920 (Grandstand); 80(VIP)
- Acreage: 12,796 m^{2} (137,730 sq ft)

Construction
- Groundbreaking: 2019
- Built: August 2019
- Cost: ₱2 billion
- Architect: Budji + Royal Architecture + Design
- Main contractor: MTD Philippines

New Clark City Aquatic Center is a swimming and diving venue at the New Clark City in Capas, Tarlac, Philippines. It is one of the venues of the New Clark City Sports Hub, which is part of the National Government Administrative Center. It hosted the aquatics events of the 2019 Southeast Asian Games and is set to host the 2023 Asian Swimming Championships.

== History ==
The construction of the whole New Clark City Sports Hub, which also includes the Aquatics Center, began on April 25, 2018 with a cement-pouring ceremony. Construction of the facility costed around ₱2 billion. By early July 2019, the aquatics center was 85 percent complete. The venue was completed by August 2019 in time for the Philippine Swimming National Open as the first event hosted in the venue.

== Architecture ==
The Bases Conversion Development Authority commissioned local architecture firm, Budji + Royal Architecture + Design to work on the New Clark City Sports Hub. The Aquatics Center covers an area of 12,796 square meters (137,730 sq ft) on a 21,936 square meters (236,120 sq ft) plot of land.

The Aquatics Center's design was derived from the baklad a local fish trap, and the Filipino weaving and woodwork and exhibits a bamboo color theme. The design consist of a huge open shed with a prismatic roof similar to a parol made of capiz coating. The roofing will be made from polytetrafluoroethylene (PTFE), a fiberglass material used for its lightweight property, durability, and weather resistance. The architects intends to cover the facility but still let natural light into its interior. At daytime, the architects intended the roof to resemble capiz windows used by old Philippine houses and at night the roof will be illuminated to resemble a lit parol.

== Facilities ==
=== Pools and equipment ===
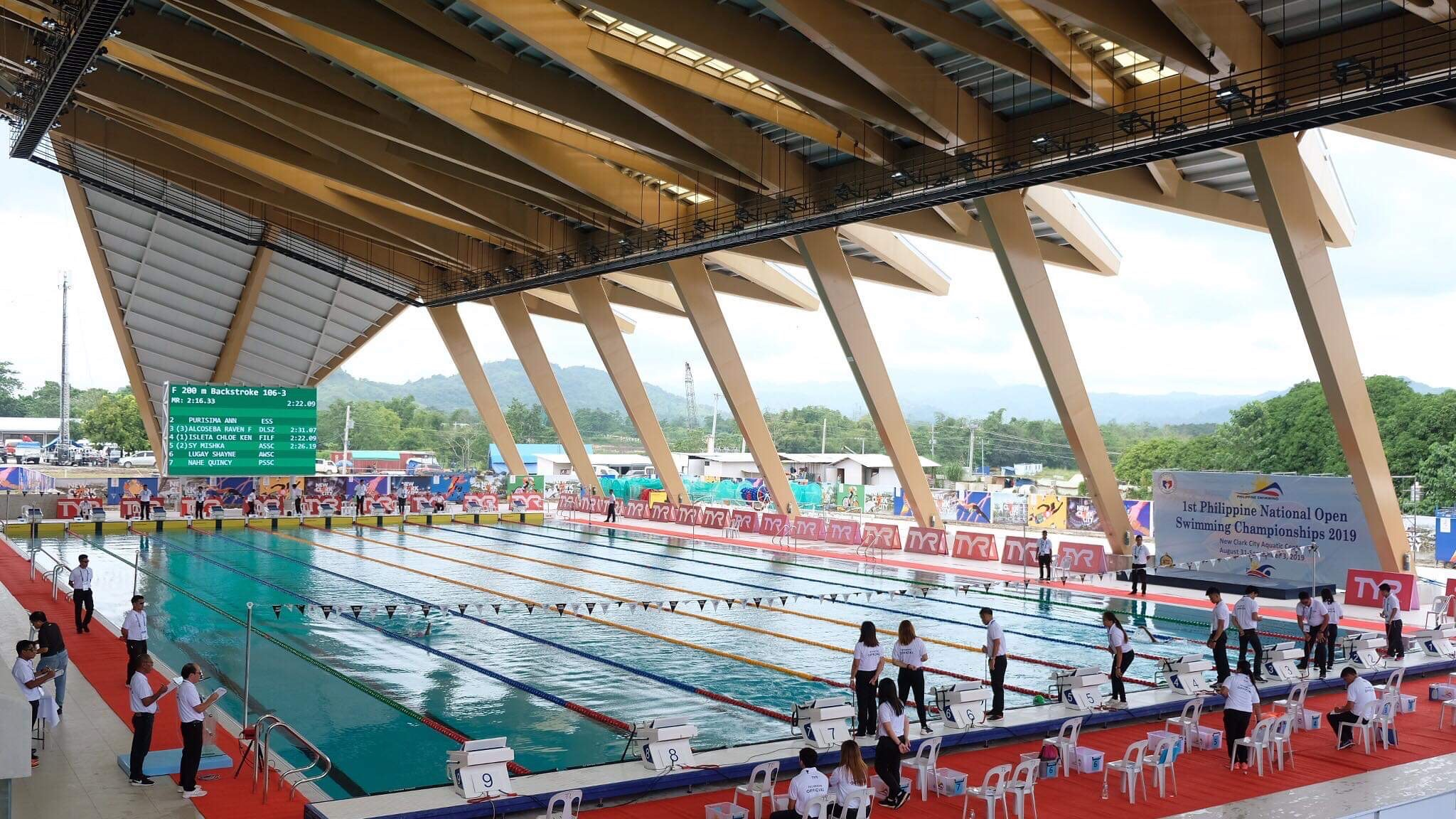
Interior of the aquatics center.

The Aquatics Center has a two-level bleachers with a seating capacity of 2,000. Above the bleachers is a furnished and air-conditioned VIP lounge.

It hosts three swimming pools, an Olympic pool, a training pool, and a diving pool. All pools have hot-steel siding and PVC linings installed. The aquatics venue also has an underwater sound system. Besides the bleachers on the ground floor. is a dryland training area

The main facility is the competition pool which has a dimension of 50 by 25 meters (164 ft × 82 ft) meters and has a depth of 3 meters (9.8 ft). Each of the pool's ten lanes are equipped with lap-timers in lieu of flip charts used traditionally in other aquatics venues. Adjacent to the competition pool is the diving pool has a dimension of 25 by 20 meters (82 ft × 66 ft) and a depth of 5 meters (16 ft). The diving pool is equipped with five diving platforms. Behind the diving pool is the 2 meters (6.6 ft) deep 8-lane training pool.

Adjacent to the bleachers is a dryland training area which hosts a foam diving area, trampolines, and stretch equipment for athletes.

The pools at the facility is accredited by the World Aquatics, an international sport governing body for water sports.

Pool	Lanes	Dimension	Depth
Competition pool	10	50 m × 25 m (164 ft × 82 ft)	3 m (9.8 ft)
Training pool	8	?	2 m (6.6 ft)
Diving pool	—N/a	25 m × 20 m (82 ft × 66 ft)	5 m (16 ft)

=== Other ===
The facility's entrance is connected to the main road by a vehicle ramp while pedestrians including persons with disabilities can access the stadium through its side entry points. The lower ground floor hosts parking spaces for 26 cars and ten buses.

== Use ==
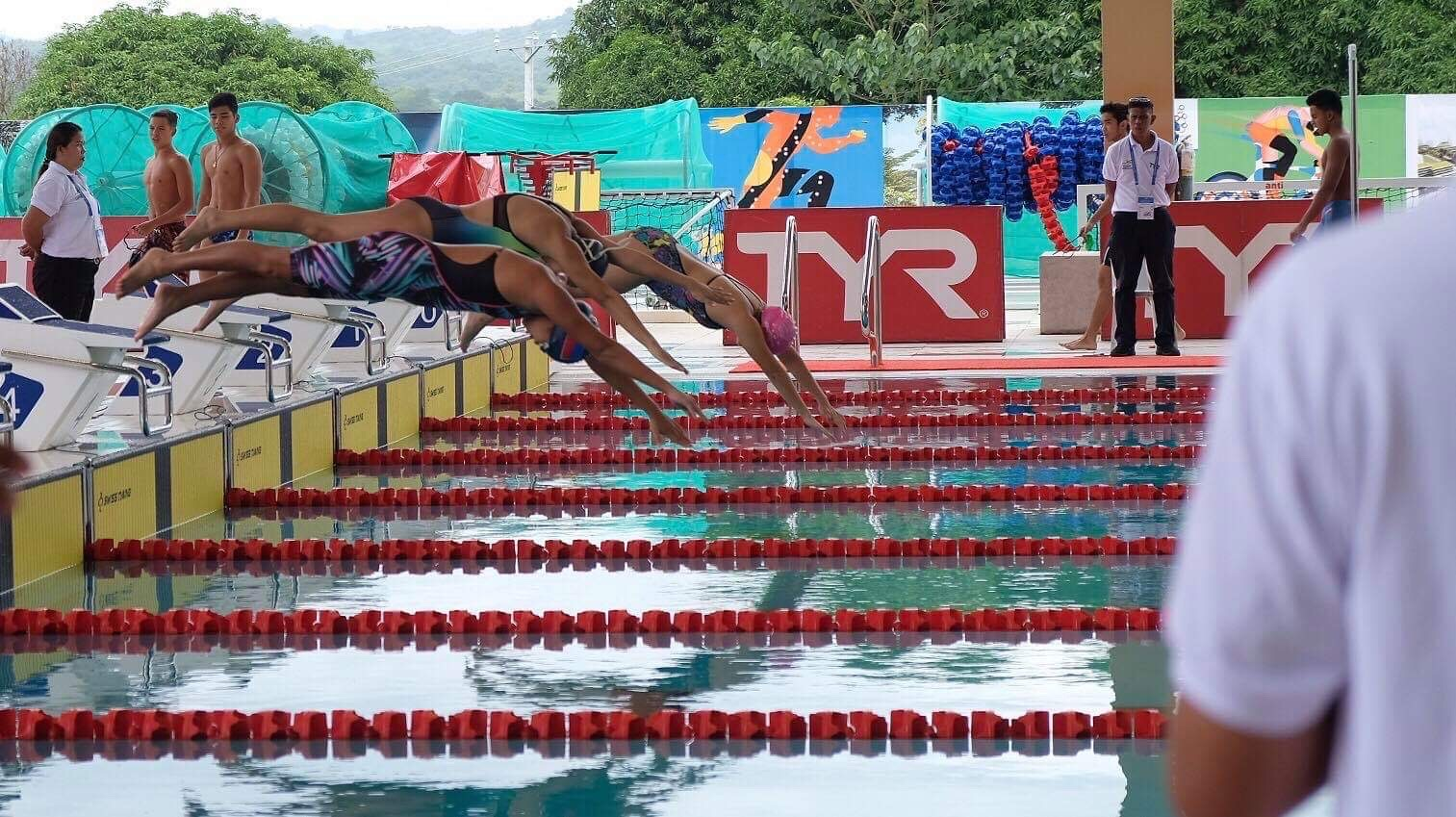
Swimmers competing at the 2019 Philippine Swimming National Open.

The aquatics center can be used for swimming and other water sports. The training pool while intended as a practice venue for athletes participating in international tournaments could also be used to hold local competitions. The Philippine Swimming National Open was held from August 31 to September 3, 2019, as the first event. The facility hosted the aquatics events, including water polo, as part of the 2019 Southeast Asian Games. It was set to host the 11th Asian Age Group Championships from February 26 to March, 9 2024.

== Gallery ==
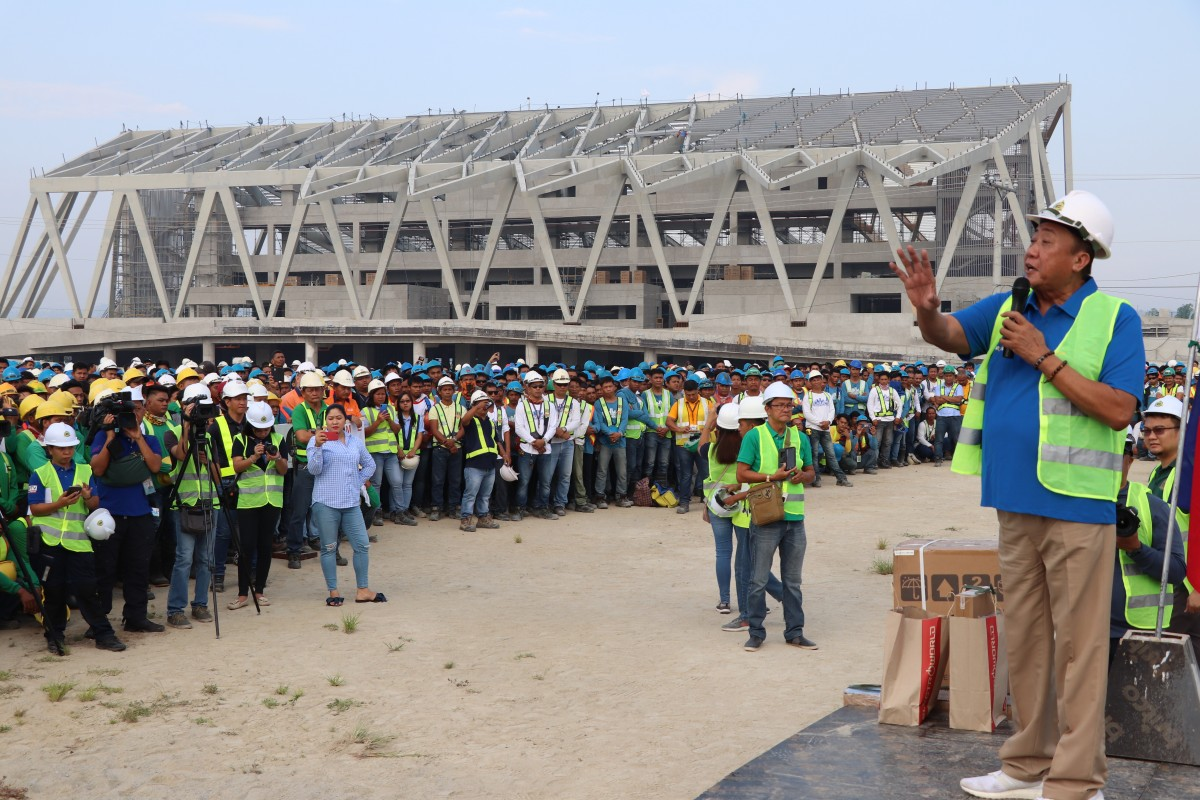

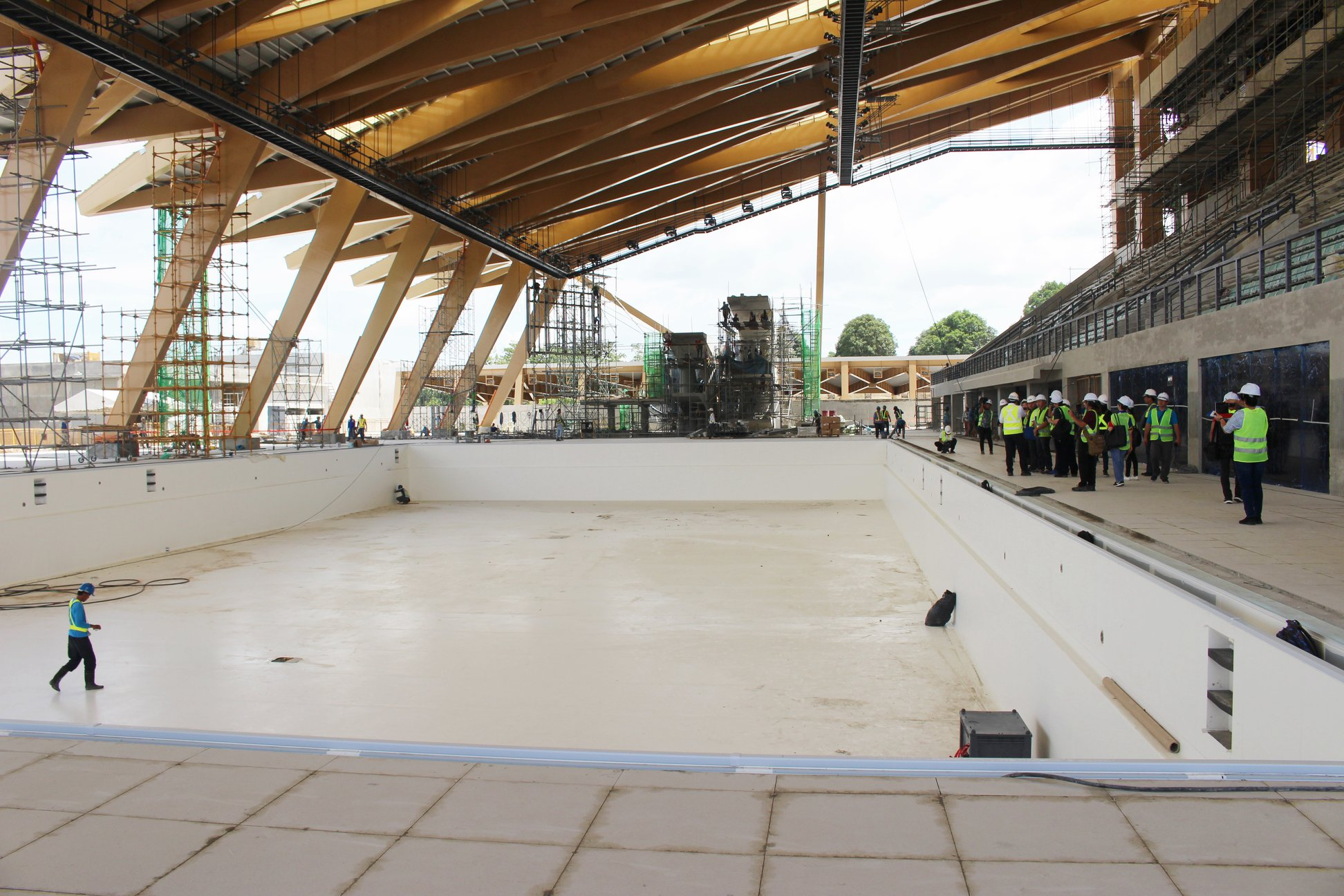

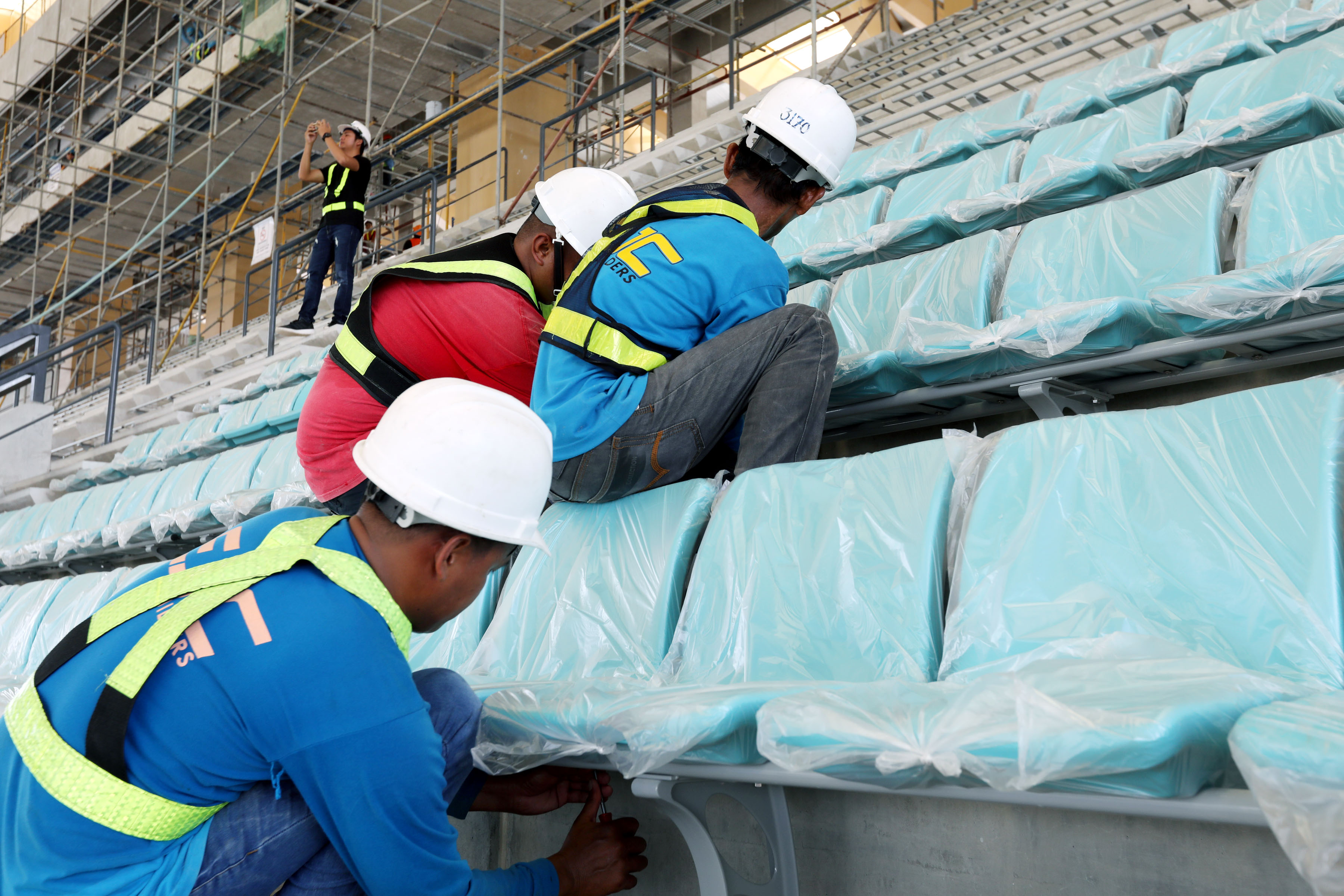

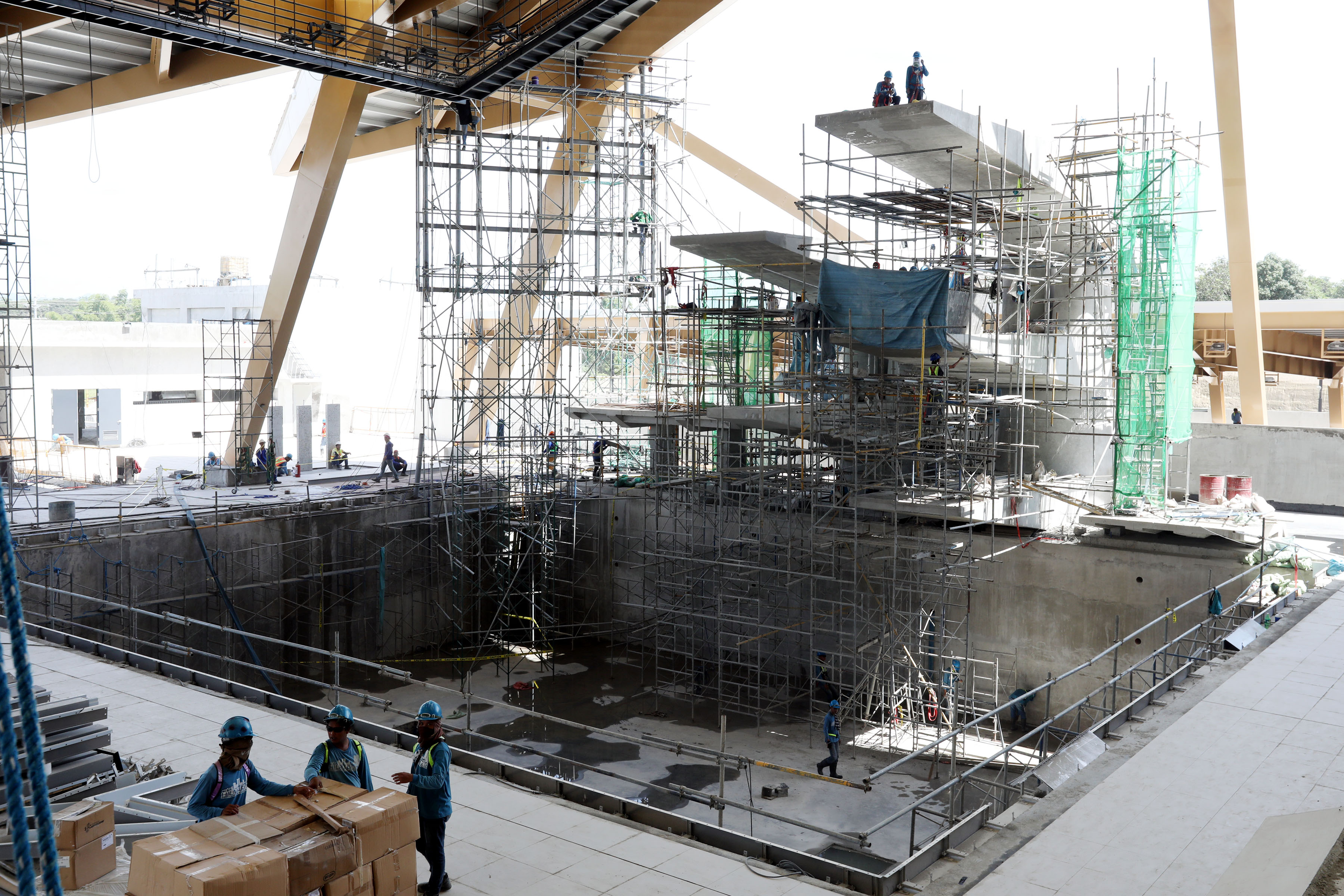

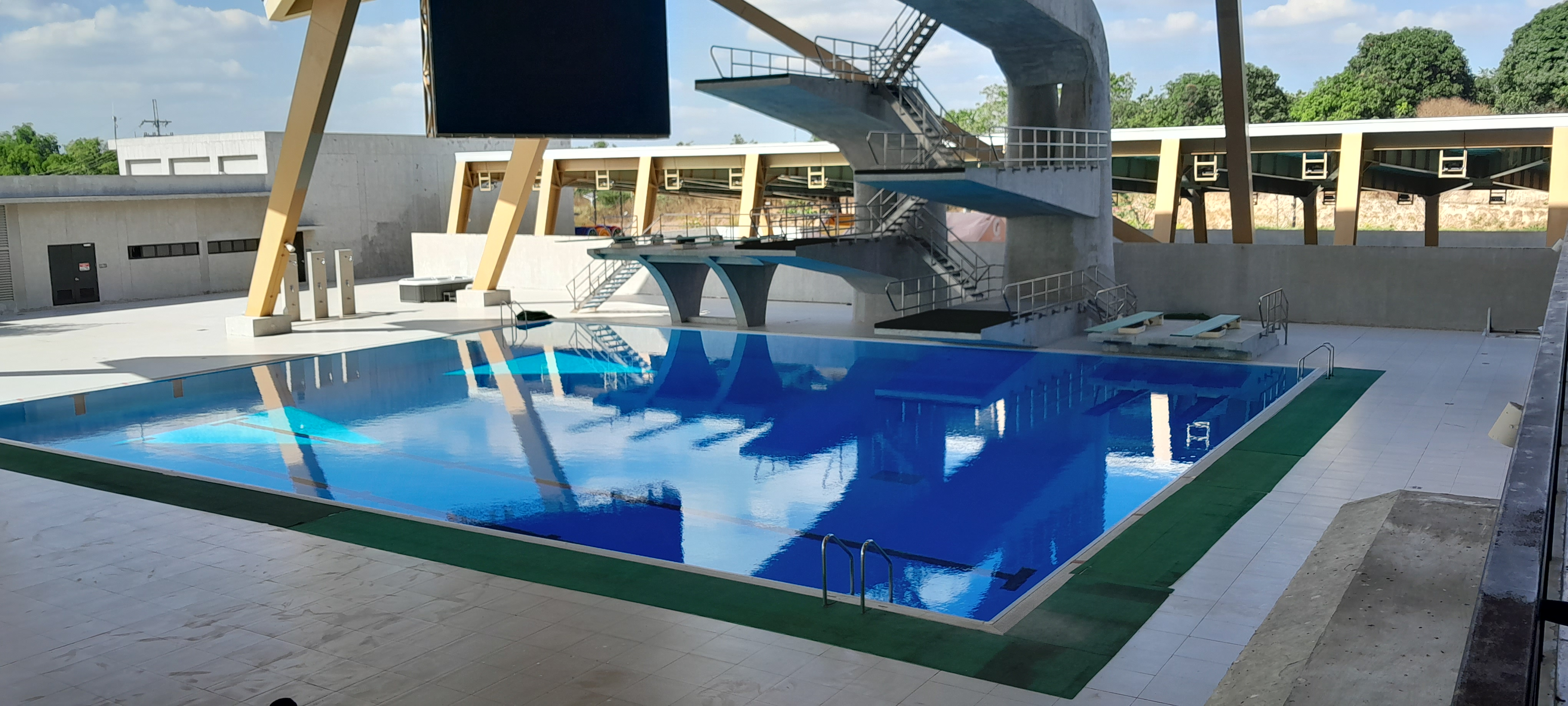
The center's diving pool

== See also ==
- New Clark City Athletics Stadium
