= Wrestling Association of the Philippines =

Wrestlingl governing body in the Philippines

- Sport: Wrestling
- Abbreviation: WAP
- Founded: August 8, 1973
- Headquarters: 3rd Floor Philippine Center for Sports Medicine Building, Rizal Memorial Sports Complex, P.Ocampo St., Malate, Manila, Philippines

Official website
- wrestlingphilippines.com
- (Philippines)

Wrestling Association of the Philippines (WAP) is the governing sports organization for wrestling in the Philippines, and maintains the Philippines National Wrestling Team.

== National team ==
The Philippines also competes against teams from Asia. They are promoting grassroots involvement with their national team and have signed Filipino's from around the globe as well as the homeland to compete in tournaments.** This is the current starting squad for the Philippines friendly vs. Malaysia as of December 5, 2009:

Note: Flags indicate national team as defined under FIFA eligibility rules; some limited exceptions apply. Players may hold more than one non-FIFA nationality.

No.	Pos.	Nation	Player
32		PHI	Christina Villanueva
2		PHI	Gemma Silverio
13		USA	Andrew Anies Fernandez Al-Sarayray Alcott
16		ENG	Jason Balabal
21		PHI	Esti Gay Liwanen
85		PHI	Razel Gutierrez
22		ITA	Mario Antelletti Gomes
14		PHI	Migeul Pinzhagi Montelivo Ricardo
10		ENG	Gareth Phillips
23		ENG	Jordan Brown
4		PHI	Jose Anton Castillo
45		PHI	Jared Hwalek

Flags denote Nation of Citizenship.

== Age-Groups ==
The Olympic sport of Greco-Roman and Freestyle wrestling is broken down into three age group levels: Cadets(16-17 yrs.old), Juniors (18-20 yrs.old), and Seniors (20 yrs.old and above). Each group follows different weight categories, as follows:

CADETS		JUNIORS		SENIORS	
Male	Female	Male	Female	Male	Female
		50 kg	44 kg	55 kg	48 kg
				60 kg	51 kg
				66 kg	55 kg
				74 kg	59 kg
				84 kg	63 kg
				96 kg	67 kg
				120 kg	72 kg
