= New Clark City Sports Hub =

Complex of sports facilities in Capas, Philippines

- Aerial view
- Interactive map of New Clark City Sports Hub
- Full name: National Government Administrative Center Sports Complex
- Former names: Philippine Sports City; Philippine Olympic City
- Location: National Government Administrative Center, New Clark City, Capas, Tarlac, Philippines
- Coordinates: 15°20′36.9″N 120°31′53.2″E
- Owner: Bases Conversion and Development Authority
- Main venue: Athletics Stadium; Capacity: 20,000
- Facilities: Aquatic Center, Athletes Village, National Sports Training Center

Construction
- Groundbreaking: April 25, 2018
- Cost: ₱3 billion–₱6 billion (estimate)
- Architect: Budji + Royal Architecture + Design
- Structural engineer: AECOM
- Main contractor: MTD Philippines

Website
- newclarkcity.ph (BCDA)

The New Clark City Sports Hub or the New Clark City Sports Complex (initially known as the Philippine Sports City or Philippine Olympic City) is a complex of sports facilities located inside the National Government Administrative Center of New Clark City in Capas, Tarlac.

== History ==
=== Development ===
Before the administration of President Rodrigo Duterte, the Philippine Olympic Committee had previous plans to put up a national training center outside Metro Manila but talks to establish such facility did not have any significant progress. Duterte personally directed Philippine Sports Commission head, William Ramirez in 2016 to "take the lead" leading to Ramirez having talks with Executive Secretary Salvador Medialdea about plans for a replacement of the old Rizal Memorial Sports Complex in Manila. There was also an earlier plan in the 2000s to build a sports complex called the Philippine Olympic City in the Clark area, which was intended to be used as a venue for the 2005 Southeast Asian Games.

After the silver medal finish by Filipino weightlifter Hidilyn Diaz at the 2016 Summer Olympics in Rio de Janeiro, Brazil, the PSC bared plans to build the "Philippine Olympic City" at New Clark City.

Ramirez said that the sports hub, which would house national athletes and sports facilities, would be one of the primary attractions at the New Clark City, then still known as Clark Green City, and could be a possible main venue of the 2019 Southeast Asian Games which would be hosted by the country. Ramirez at that time projected that the sports complex would be open by 2018. The sports complex would have the Bases Conversion Development Authority (BCDA) as the primary involved body in its construction following a meeting between the PSC Board and BCDA president Vince Dizon.

The Philippine Sports Commission estimated that the project would cost between ₱3 billion to ₱6 billion. A ₱1 billion savings from the PSC could be used to partly finance the construction by the BCDA, a GOCC that developed the Clark and Subic as well as Villamor Air Base and Fort Bonifacio.

=== Construction ===
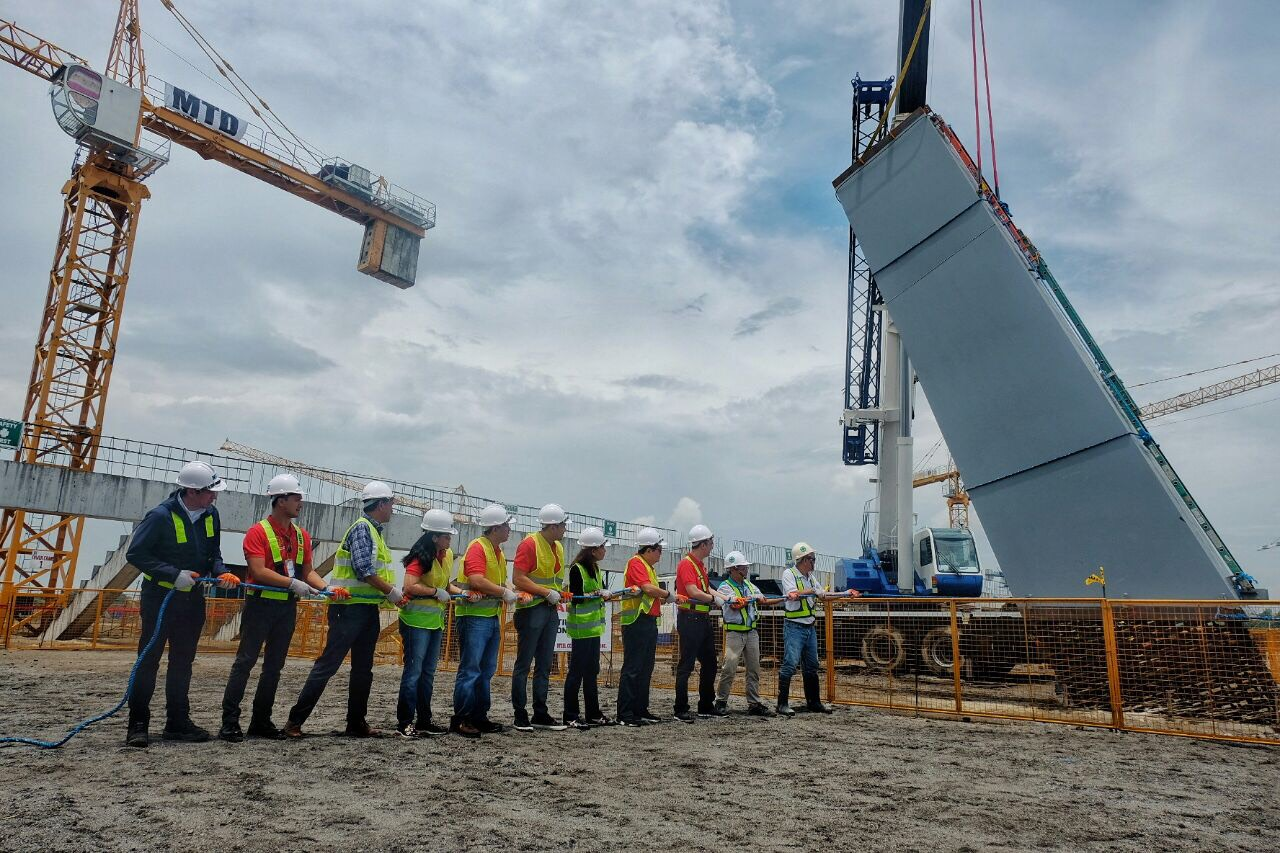
Installation of the composite columns of the Athletics Stadium. (July 2018)

Groundbreaking for the National Government Administrative Center (NGAC) as a whole was held on January 23, 2018 and actual construction started on March 15, 2018. The New Clark City Sports Hub forms a significant portion of the Phase 1A of the larger mixed-used government complex's development. Construction of the sports complex itself began on April 25, 2018, which was marked by a cement-pouring ceremony. Around 8,000 people were employed for the project with construction work done continuously or 24 hours a day, seven days a week.

The whole Phase 1A of the NGAC was targeted to be completed by October 2019. As of October 2018, the sports complex was already 30 percent complete. By November 2018, the projected completion of the sports complex was moved earlier to August 2019 with test events planned to be held at the venue from August to October 2019.

Following the 2019 Luzon earthquake, no damage was reported on the site of the sport's complex construction. By June 2019, the facility was 85 to 88 percent complete with most of the remaining work involved the area's landscaping.

The sports complex was 90 percent complete by July 2019 with the Athletics Stadium and Aquatic Center and was set to be completed by the end of August 2019.

=== Preparation ===
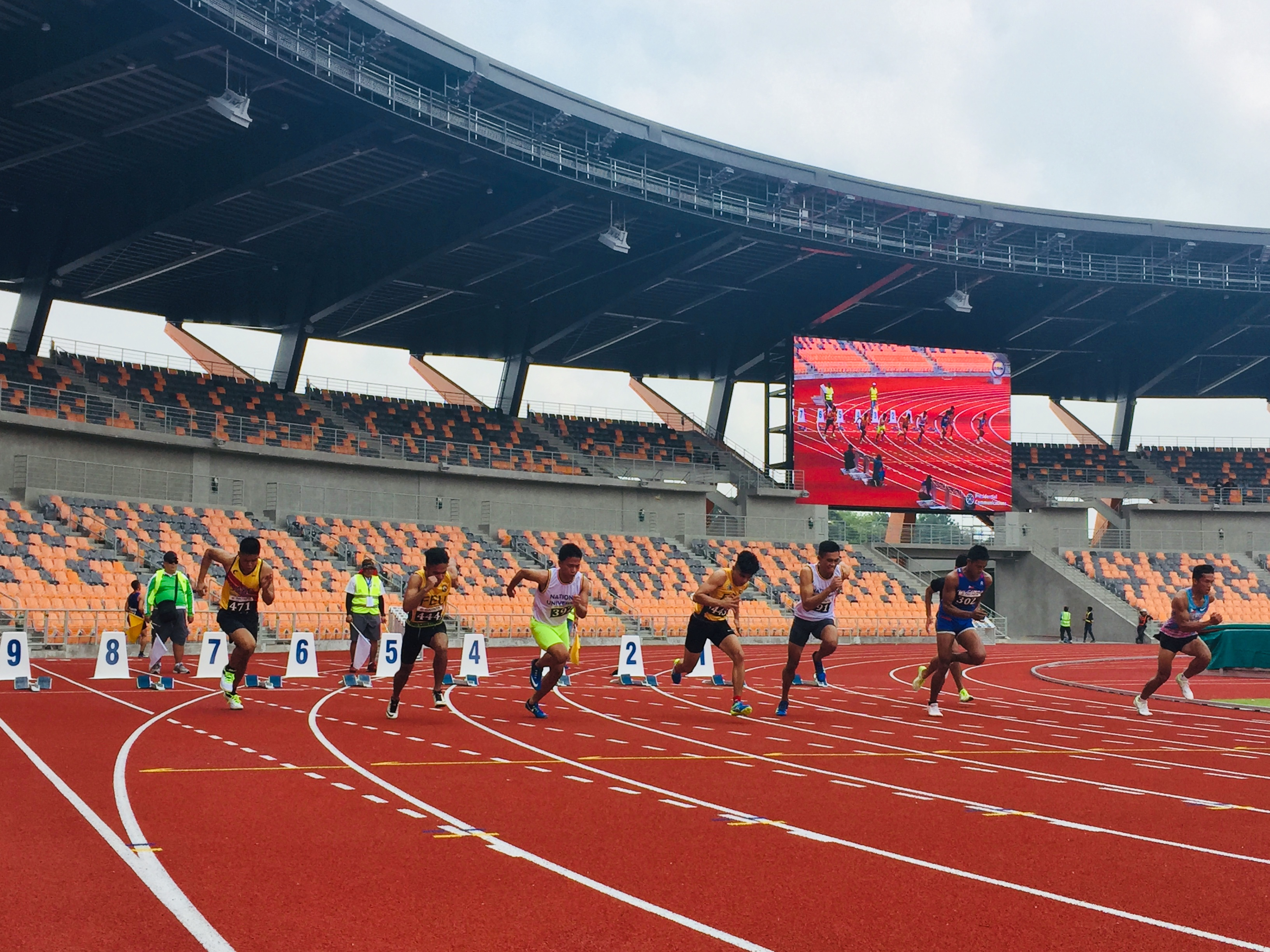
Final leg of the PATAFA weekly relay.

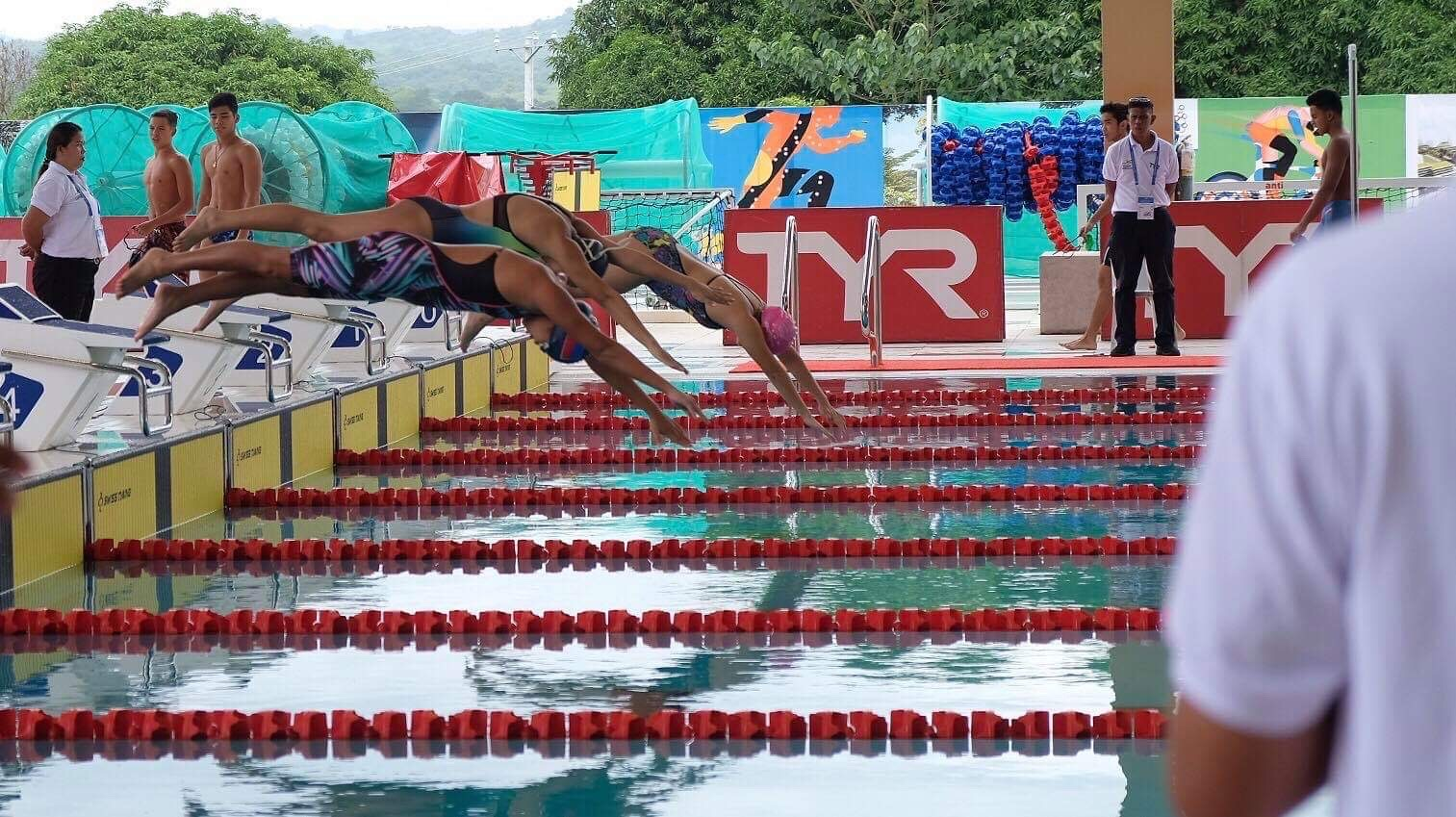
Swimmers competing at the 2019 Philippine Swimming National Open.

The stadium was first used to host the final leg of the Philippine Athletics Track and Field Association weekly relay which was held on September 1, 2019 and the aquatic center for the 2019 Philippine Swimming National Open which began on August 31, 2019. Both events were qualifiers for Filipino athletes aiming to compete for their country in the 2019 Southeast Asian Games.

In the weekend of October 19 and October 20, 2019, the triathlon race event was held for the first time at the sports complex.

On October 26 and 27, 2019, the sports complex also held the test event of the 2019 Southeast Asian Games.

=== Future ===
The BCDA announced its plans to construct additional sports facilities such as an indoor arena that can host indoor events such as basketball, as well as a lot reserved for outdoor sports such as shooting in a six-hectare area. It also announced plans to build other sports facilities for football, tennis, and cycling.

BCDA president Vince Dizon stated that the sports complex will privatize its maintenance and operations right after the SEA Games. Dizon explained that they wanted to privatize it to make the complex being well taken care of unlike being a government-run that became deteriorated. To avoid becoming a "white elephant", they follow the success stories of other world-class sports facilities (such as Singapore Sports Hub in Singapore, Queen Elizabeth Olympic Park in London and Sydney Olympic Park in Sydney). They also planned to turn the complex into a multi-purpose, similar to what London and Sydney did after their hosting of Summer Olympic Games respectively.

The sports complex will serve as the permanent home of the Filipino athletes and to be facilitated by the Philippine Sports Commission.

In September 2025, the BCDA and the Philippine Tennis Association announced plans to build a tennis center spanning 10-hectares.

== Architecture and design ==
Local architecture firm, Budji + Royal Architecture + Design, were commissioned by the Bases Conversion Development Authority to work on the New Clark City Sports Hub. The firm collaborated with American urban planner and engineering firm AECOM. Architect Royal Pineda and interior designer Budji Layug of Budji + Royal are involved in the sports complex project. The design of the complex was inspired by the parol, a Filipino Christmas lantern. Most structures within the complex have a dark gray lahar finish as a nod to the nearby Mount Pinatubo volcano.

Surbana Jurong, a Singaporean firm, also did consultation work regarding the design of the facilities. The sports complex was modeled by the firm after the Singapore Sports Hub.

=== Athletics Stadium ===
The athletics stadium.

The main stadium, whose design was derived from Mount Pinatubo, had its posts and facade made from lahar debris from the volcano. Its ringed roofline was made to resemble a crater and be defined by a series of curving canopies. The main entrance is covered by glass frames. The stadium's pillars are painted orange to represent the local sunset.

=== Aquatic Center ===
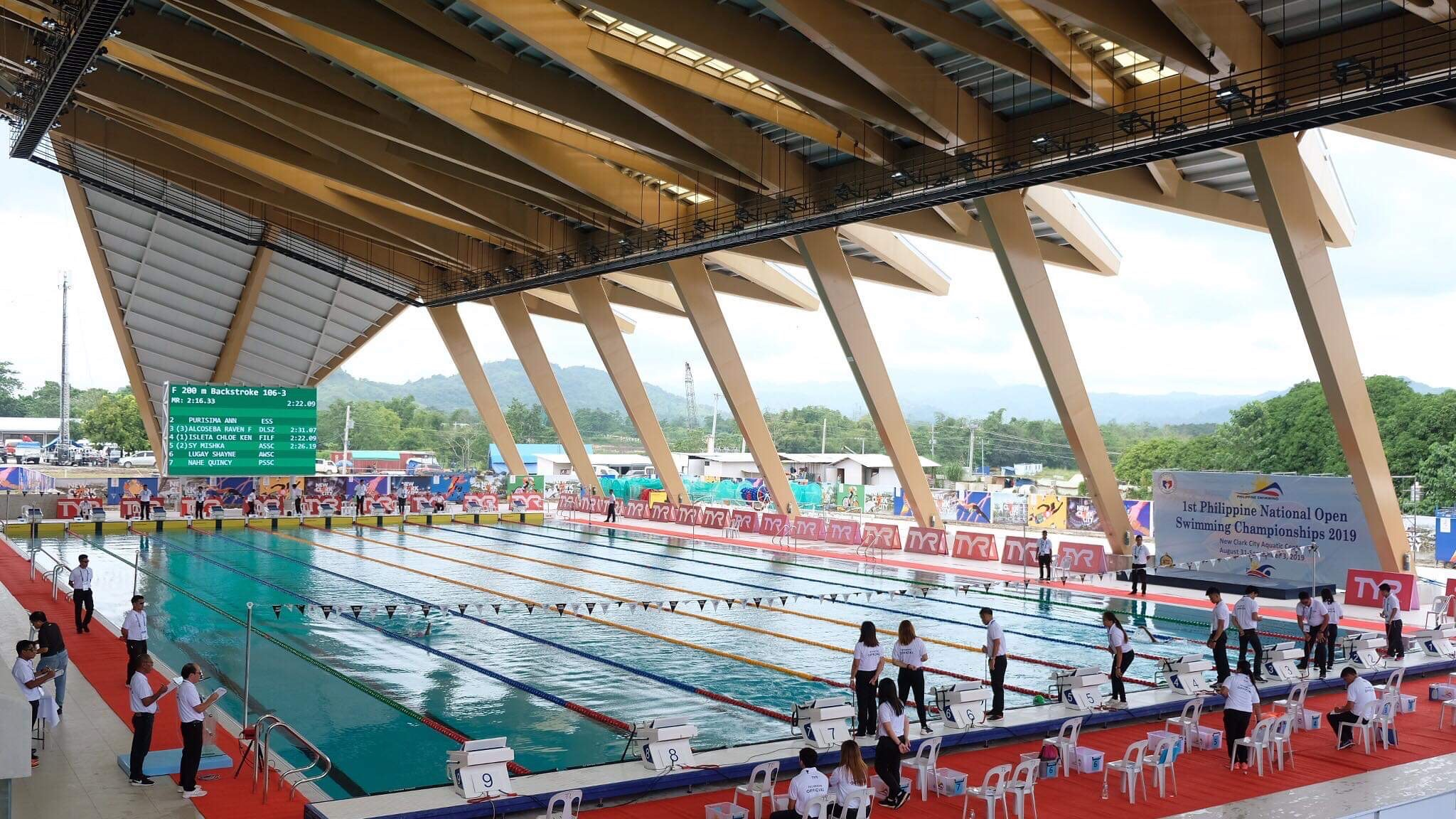
The aquatics center.

The Aquatic Center's design consist of a huge open shed with a prismatic roof similar to a parol made of capiz coating. The roofing is made from polytetrafluoroethylene (PTFE), a fiberglass material used for its lightweight property, durability, and weather resistance. The architects intends to cover the facility but still let natural light into its interior. At daytime, the architects intended the roof to resemble capiz windows used by old Philippine houses and has illumination designed to make the structure resemble a lit parol. The venue which hosts two swimming pools, a 10-lane Olympic pool and an 8-lane training pool. The 2,000-seater Aquatic Centre, which hosted the swimming, diving, and water polo competitions of the 2019 Southeast Asian Games, was built to be fully compliant with the global standards set by international aquatic governing body Fédération internationale de natation.

== Facilities ==
=== Sports venues ===
Venue	Purpose	Seating capacity	Year built
Athletics Stadium	Multi-use, primarily track and field (athletics) and football	20,000	2019
Aquatic Center	Aquatics sports venue	2,000	2019
Athletics Warm-up Track Oval	Track and field (athletics) training facility	N/A	2019

=== Other facilities ===
The Government Residences (front) and the Athletes Village (left)

Venue	Purpose	Year built	Notes
Athletes Village	Accommodation spaces for athletes and officials participating in competitions, conference venue	2019	525 rooms.
National River Park Corridor	Park and leisure space	2019	Covers 1.4 kilometres (0.87 mi) and consists of jogging paths, bikeways, open amphitheaters, and designated public areas for exercises such as yoga and zumba.

== Tenants ==
The New Clark City Sports Hub is located inside the National Government Administrative Center (NGAC) which also contains government buildings, government residences, a polyclinic and a commercial center. Located just across the NGAC, is the main campus of the National Academy of Sports which will complement the sporting facilities. It is expected to open in August 2021.

== Events ==
The New Clark City Sports Hub has hosted major sporting competition from sports organizations, private entities and government agencies.

Sporting events at the NGAC Sports Complex
Date	Event name	Facilities	Organizations	Ref
2019
August 31–September 3, 2019	1st Philippine National Open Swimming Championships	Aquatics Center	Philippine Swimming, Inc.	
September 1,22 and 29, 2019	PATAFA Weekly Relay Series	Athletics Stadium	Philippine Athletics Track and Field Association	
October 18–20, 2019	New Clark City Triathlon	Aquatics Center and Athletics Stadium	Go Clark and Bases Conversion and Development Authority	
November 30 - December 11, 2019	2019 Southeast Asian Games	Aquatics Center and Athletics Stadium	Southeast Asian Games Federation	
2020
February 3–8, 2020	State Colleges and Universities Athletics Association (SCUAA) III Olympics	Aquatics Center and Athletics Stadium	State Colleges and Universities Athletic Association	
2021
October 22–24, 2021	2021 Philippine Swimming Inc. National Selection Bubble	Aquatics Center	Philippine Swimming, Inc.	
2022
March 26–27, 2022	2022 FINIS Short Course Swim Competition Series – Luzon leg	Aquatics Center	FINIS Philippines	
March 27, 2022	FINIS Kids of Steel Triathlon	Aquatics Center	FINIS Philippines	
April 23, 2022	80th Central Northern Luzon-CAR Swimming Coaches Association (CNLCSCA) Swim Series	Aquatics Center	CNLCSCA and AC Dax Aquatics Swim Club	
June 6	New Clark City Spartan Stadion	Athletics Stadium	Spartan Race Philippines	
June 25–26	83rd CNLCSCA Swim Series	Aquatics Center	CNLCSCA	
July 17	New Clark City Duathlon	Athletics Stadium and Open Roads	GoClark Sports and Events	
August 6–7	85th CNLCSCA Invitational Friendship Meet	Aquatics Center	CNLCSCA	
August 20–21	FINIS Short Course National Finals	Aquatics Center	FINIS Philippines	
August 27–28	Clark Cycling Classics	Open Roads	GoClark	
August 27–29	PSI Long Course Grand Prix Qualifying Series CNL - CAR	Aquatics Center	PSI	
September 10–11	86th CNLCSCA Swim Series	Aquatics Center	CNLCSCA	
October 13–16	PSI Long Course Grand Prix National Championships	Aquatics Center	PSI	

== See also ==
- Rizal Memorial Sports Complex
- PhilSports Complex
