= Sacobia Bridge =

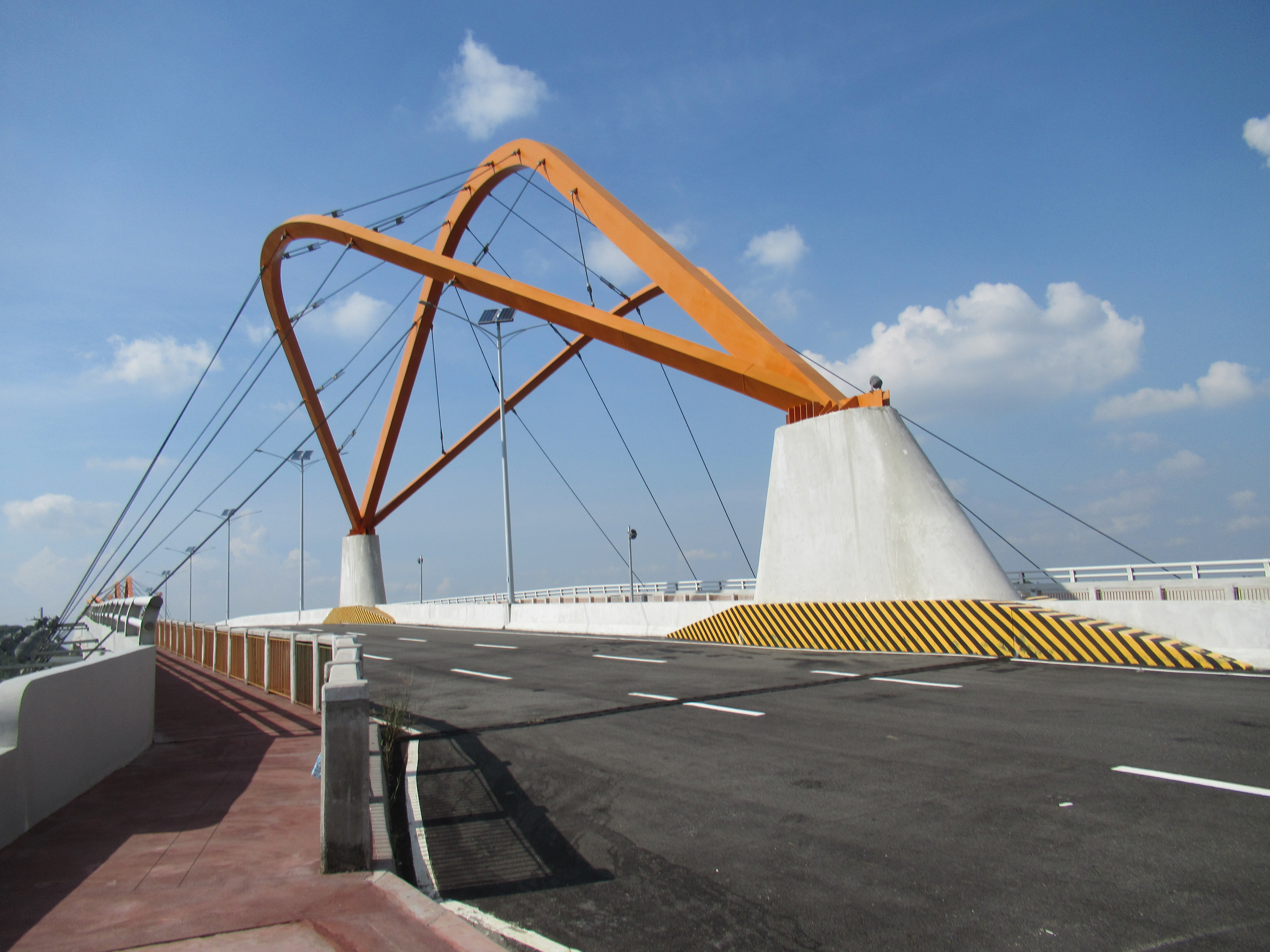
- Coordinates: 15°12′56″N 120°32′00″E
- Carries: 6 lanes of vehicular traffic
- Crosses: Sacobia River
- Locale: Mabalacat City, Pampanga

Characteristics
- Material: Steel
- Total length: 894 m (2,933 ft)

History
- Construction end: 2022

Location
- Interactive map of Sacobia Bridge

The Sacobia Bridge is a road bridge in Mabalacat City, Pampanga. The structure crosses over the Sacobia River. It is part of the One Clark Boulevard access road, which connects the Clark International Airport and Clark Freeport Zone to New Clark City. It is a six-lane 894 m (2,933 ft) steel bridge. The bridge was designed by Royal Pineda.

== History ==
On February 21, 2024, President Ferdinand R. Marcos Jr. led the inspection and the opening of the 19.81-kilometer, six-lane One Clark Boulevard (formerly Airport-New Clark City Access Road or ANAR).

The Sacobia Bridge is a prominent landmark and key highlight of various sporting events in Clark and New Clark City, particularly running, cycling, and marathon events.

== In popular culture ==
The Filipino pop group Bini featured the Sacobia Bridge in the music video for Golden Arrow and as the backdrop for the cover of its debut album, Born To Win.

== See also ==
- Bamban Bridge
