= National Government Administrative Center =

Mixed-used development in Tarlac, Philippines

- Clockwise from top: Government Center, Athletes Village, NCC Athletics Stadium, NCC Aquatics Center
- Interactive map of National Government Administrative Center
- Location: New Clark City, Capas, Tarlac
- Coordinates: 15°20′41″N 120°31′50″E
- Status: Under Construction (Phase 1A of the project completed)
- Groundbreaking: January 23, 2018
- Estimated completion: 2020
- Use: Mixed-use (Government)
- Website: newclark.ph (BCDA) and mtd-clark-ngac.com (Alloy-MTD)

Companies
- Developer: AlloyMTD
- Owner: Bases Conversion and Development Authority

Technical details
- Cost: ₱13.16 billion
- Size: 200 ha (490 acres)

The National Government Administrative Center (NGAC) is a 200-hectare (490-acre) mixed-use development in New Clark City, Capas, Tarlac. The district primarily host Philippine government facilities such as offices of various government agencies, government housing units, sports ammenities and other support services facilities. The area is owned and managed by the Bases Conversion and Development Authority.

== History ==
=== Development and construction ===
The area is part of New Clark City and is owned and managed by the Bases Conversion and Development Authority. The NGAC is being developed by AlloyMTD, the investment arm of Malaysian firm MTD Capital.

The planning for the NGAC began as early as September 2017 with the groundbreaking ceremony held on January 23, 2018. Actual construction work began on March 15, 2018. The Phase 1 of the development includes backup offices of various government agencies as contingency in case a national calamity and disaster affect the capital, Manila as well as a "one-stop-shop" for business enterprises in Central Luzon.

Phase 1A of the development includes the construction of a sports complex consisting of a stadium with 20,100 seating capacity and an aquatics center with 2,000 seating capacity which is meant to be one of the venues of the 2019 Southeast Asian Games to be hosted by the Philippines. It also includes two buildings which will host the Integrated Operations Center which includes a satellite office of the Office of the President of the Philippines and disaster and risk management agencies, a 500-unit condominium housing for government employees, and a river park. Phase 1B involves the construction of additional government facilities.

The Bases Conversion and Development Authority and the Supreme Court of the Philippines signed a memorandum of agreement in July 2019 regarding the construction of a building complex to host a regional office for the high court.

The Bangko Sentral ng Pilipinas will relocate its security plant complex from East Avenue, Quezon City to New Clark City after it signed a memorandum of agreement with the BCDA in September 2019. The new currency production facility will be located at the 29-hectare land near the access road connecting New Clark City to the Subic–Clark–Tarlac Expressway and it is expected to be completed within two years.

== See also ==
- List of sporting events in New Clark City
