= Philippines at the 2025 World Aquatics Championships =

- Flag of the Philippines
- World Aquatics code: PHI
- National federation: Philippine Aquatics
- Website: www.philippineaquatics.com

in Singapore
- Competitors: 3 in 2 sports
- Medals: Gold 0 Silver 0 Bronze 0 Total 0

World Aquatics Championships appearances
- 1973; 1975; 1978; 1982; 1986; 1991; 1994; 1998; 2001; 2003; 2005; 2007; 2009; 2011; 2013; 2015; 2017; 2019; 2022; 2023; 2024; 2025

The Philippines competed at the 2025 World Aquatics Championships in Singapore from July 11 to August 3, 2025.

== Competitors ==
The following is the list of competitors in the Championships.

Sport	Men	Women	Total
Diving	0	1	1
Swimming	2	0	2
Total	2	1	3

== Diving ==
Women

Athlete	Event	Preliminaries		Semifinals		Final	
Athlete	Event	Points	Rank	Points	Rank	Points	Rank
Ariana Drake	1 m springboard	182.00	46	—		Did not advance	
Ariana Drake	3 m springboard	223.95	37	Did not advance			

== Swimming ==
The Philippines entered 2 swimmers.

Men

Athlete	Event	Heat		Semi-final		Final	
Athlete	Event	Time	Rank	Time	Rank	Time	Rank
Adrian Eichler	100 m freestyle	51.52	60	Did not advance			
Adrian Eichler	200 m freestyle	1:51.39	42	Did not advance			
Gian Santos	400 m freestyle	3:57.86	34	—		Did not advance	
Gian Santos	200 m individual medley	2:05.07	37	Did not advance			
