= Water polo at the 2015 SEA Games =

- Venue: OCBC Aquatic Centre
- Dates: 10–16 June 2015
- Competitors: 130 from 5 nations

Medalists
gold medal	Singapore men
gold medal	Thailand women

Water polo at the 2015 SEA Games was held from 10 to 16 June 2015 at the OCBC Aquatic Centre in Kallang, Singapore. The competition was held in a round-robin format, where the top 3 teams at the end of the competition will win the gold, silver, and bronze medal respectively.

== Participating nations ==
A total of 130 athletes from five nations competed in water polo at the 2015 Southeast Asian Games:

- Indonesia (26)
- Malaysia (26)
- Philippines (26)
- Singapore (26)
- Thailand (26)

== Draw ==
The draw ceremony for the team sports was held on 15 April 2015 at Singapore. Both men's and women's competitions was played in the event's single round robin format.

Men

- Singapore (Host)
- Indonesia
- Thailand
- Philippines
- Malaysia

Women

- Indonesia
- Philippines
- Thailand
- Malaysia
- Singapore (Host)

== Competition schedule ==
The following was the competition schedule for the water polo competitions:

R	Round-robin matches

Event↓/Date →	Wed 10	Thu 11	Fri 12	Sat 13	Sun 14	Mon 15	Tue 16
Men		R	R	R	R	R	R
Women	R		R	R	R	R	

== Medalists ==
Event	Gold	Silver	Bronze
Men's tournament	Singapore (SIN); Tay Sin Chao Nigel; Lin Diyang; Loh Zhi Zhi; Teo Zhen Wei Eugene; Ong Wei Loong Bryan; Paul Louis Tan Jwee Ann; Chiam Kunyang; Ang An Jun; Goh Cheng Wei Marcus; Ang Wei Ming Sean; Yip Yang; Koh Jian Ying; Lee Kai Yang	Indonesia (INA); Zuliansyah; Beby Willy Eka Paksi Tarigan; Muhammad Rizki; Delvin Feliciano; Andi Muhammad Uwayzulqarni; Benny Respati; Yusuf Budiman; Rezza Auditya Putra; Brandley Ignatius Legawa; Ridjkie Mulia; Muhamad Hamid Firdaus; Zaenal Arifin; Novian Dwi Putra	Thailand (THA); Naruedon Niwasakul; Pattanit Chompoosang; Pitipong Ruchisereekul; Pinit Chaisombat; Patipol Phandphoung; Julanut Jintanugool; Meathus Chetamee; Terdtong Klinubol; Ronnakrit Jarananon; Pruetthikorn Khunprathum; Sornthum Wongpairoj; Ekkaphan Jaengprajak; Wanjak Suwanchart
Women's tournament	Thailand (THA); Satakamol Wongpairoj; Paveenuch Phandphoung; Pranisa Nilklad; Wataniya Nilklad; Alwani Sathitanon; Kornkarn Puengpongsakul; Sineenart Sonthipakdee; Varistha Saraikarn; Yuwadee Seenoon; Sarocha Rewrujirek; Varisa Wangvongcharoen; Papimol Munchawanont; Soracha Sangkaman	Singapore (SIN); Low Seet Teng; Gina Koh Ting Yi; Wu Zhekang; Shauna Christine Sim Hwei Sian; Adelyn Yew Yan Xiang; Angeline Teo Yi Ling; Lim Wen Xin; Lynnette Jane Tan Hui Ying; Ng Yi Wen; Chen Yi Wei Denise; Loke En Yuan; Tan Hui Ning Sheryl; Eunice Karina Fu Yumin	Indonesia (INA); Siti Balkis; Melviani Rayina Eka; Febrika Indirawati; Hudaidah Kadir; Andi Nurul Husnul Khatimah; Glindra Patricia Legawa; Sarah Manzilina; Ayudya Suidarwanty Pratiwi; Febby Familya Putri; Inez Febrianti Rasyid; Aldila Putri Santoso; Ariel Dyah Siwabessy; Annisa Nadhilah Utoro

== Medal table ==
* Host nation (Singapore)

Rank	Nation	Gold	Silver	Bronze	Total
1	Singapore (SIN)*	1	1	0	2
2	Thailand (THA)	1	0	1	2
3	Indonesia (INA)	0	1	1	2
Totals (3 entries)		2	2	2	6

== Final standing ==
=== Men ===
Pos	Team	Pld	W	D	L	GF	GA	GD	Pts	Final Result
1	Singapore (H)	4	4	0	0	74	18	+56	8	Gold medal
2	Indonesia	4	3	0	1	56	35	+21	6	Silver medal
3	Thailand	4	2	0	2	34	41	−7	4	Bronze medal
4	Malaysia	4	1	0	3	24	47	−23	2	
5	Philippines	4	0	0	4	18	65	−47	0	

Source: Seagames 2015
(H) Hosts

=== Women ===
Pos	Team	Pld	W	D	L	GF	GA	GD	Pts	Final Result
1	Thailand	4	4	0	0	40	16	+24	8	Gold medal
2	Singapore (H)	4	3	0	1	52	14	+38	6	Silver medal
3	Indonesia	4	2	0	2	39	31	+8	4	Bronze medal
4	Malaysia	4	1	0	3	21	49	−28	2	
5	Philippines	4	0	0	4	15	57	−42	0	

Source: Seagames 2015
(H) Hosts
