= Sherwin de la Paz =

Filipino water polo player and coach

Personal information
- Nationality: Filipino
Medal record
Men's water polo
Representing the Philippines
Southeast Asian Games
| Silver medal – second place | 2005 Philippines | Team |
| Silver medal – second place | 2007 Nakhon Ratchasima | Team |
| Silver medal – second place | 2009 Vientiane | Team |
| Silver medal – second place | 2011 Jakarta-Palembang | Team |
Women's water polo
Head Coach for Philippines
Southeast Asian Games
| Bronze medal – third place | 2019 Philippines | Team |

Sherwin Anatacio de la Paz is a retired Filipino water polo player and current head coach of the Philippines women's national water polo team. He was a member of the Philippines men's national water polo team from 2003 to 2011. He is a four-time Southeast Asian Games silver medalist (2005, 2007, 2009 and 2011). He later coached the women's team to a bronze medal at the 2019 Southeast Asian Games.
