= Mark Joseph (sports administrator) =

Filipino athlete and sports manager (1963-2019

Member of the Makati City Council from the 1st district
- In office June 30, 1998 – June 30, 2001

Personal details
- Born: 1962 or 1963
- Died: March 6, 2019 (aged 56) London, United Kingdom
- Party: Lakas (1998–2001)
- Occupation: swimmer, coach, sports administrator
- Known for: President of the Philippine Amateur Swimming Association

Mark Joseph (1962/1963 – March 6, 2019) was a Filipino swimmer, coach and later sports administrator who was president of the Philippine Amateur Swimming Association around 2005 to 2018.

== Competitive career ==
Joseph was a competitive swimmer and had qualified to compete in the 1980 Summer Olympics in Moscow. He however was unable to compete due to the Philippines joining the United States-led boycott. He retired from swimming in 1986.

== Coaching career ==
Joseph was coach of the Philippine swimming team at the 1996 Summer Olympics in Atlanta.

== Sports administration ==
In 2004, a leadership crisis arose within the Philippine Amateur Swimming Association (PASA) with Mark Joseph claiming the presidency in an election. He challenged the leadership of Monchito Ilagan. The Philippine Olympic Committee affirmed the installation of Joseph as PASA president in 2005 as a result of an alleged agreement between him and Ilagan. This includes the holding of an election within 90 days. Election was claimed to have occurred in March 2005 or 2006.

PASA achieved feats under Joseph, qualifying five swimmers for the 2008 Summer Olympics. In the 2007 Southeast Asian Games the country won eight gold medals. However Joseph's administration also had further controversies. The federation often came into conflict with the Philippine Swimming League (PSL) of Nikki Coseteng and Susan Papa and Joseph faced graft allegations involving the disbursement of government funds.

Joseph while attending a coaching course in the United States resigned from his position to allow for a transition. Lani Velasco took over Officer in Charge, before she herself was elected as president after an election sanctioned by the Philippine Olympic Committee in February 2018.

Joseph was also a member of the High Diving Commission in the FINA.

== Political career ==
Joseph was a city councilor of Makati's first district from 1998 to 2001.

== Death ==
Joseph died at age 56 on March 6, 2019 at his residence in London in the United Kingdom. He was pursuing to be a theologian at the time of his death.
