= List of sporting events in New Clark City =

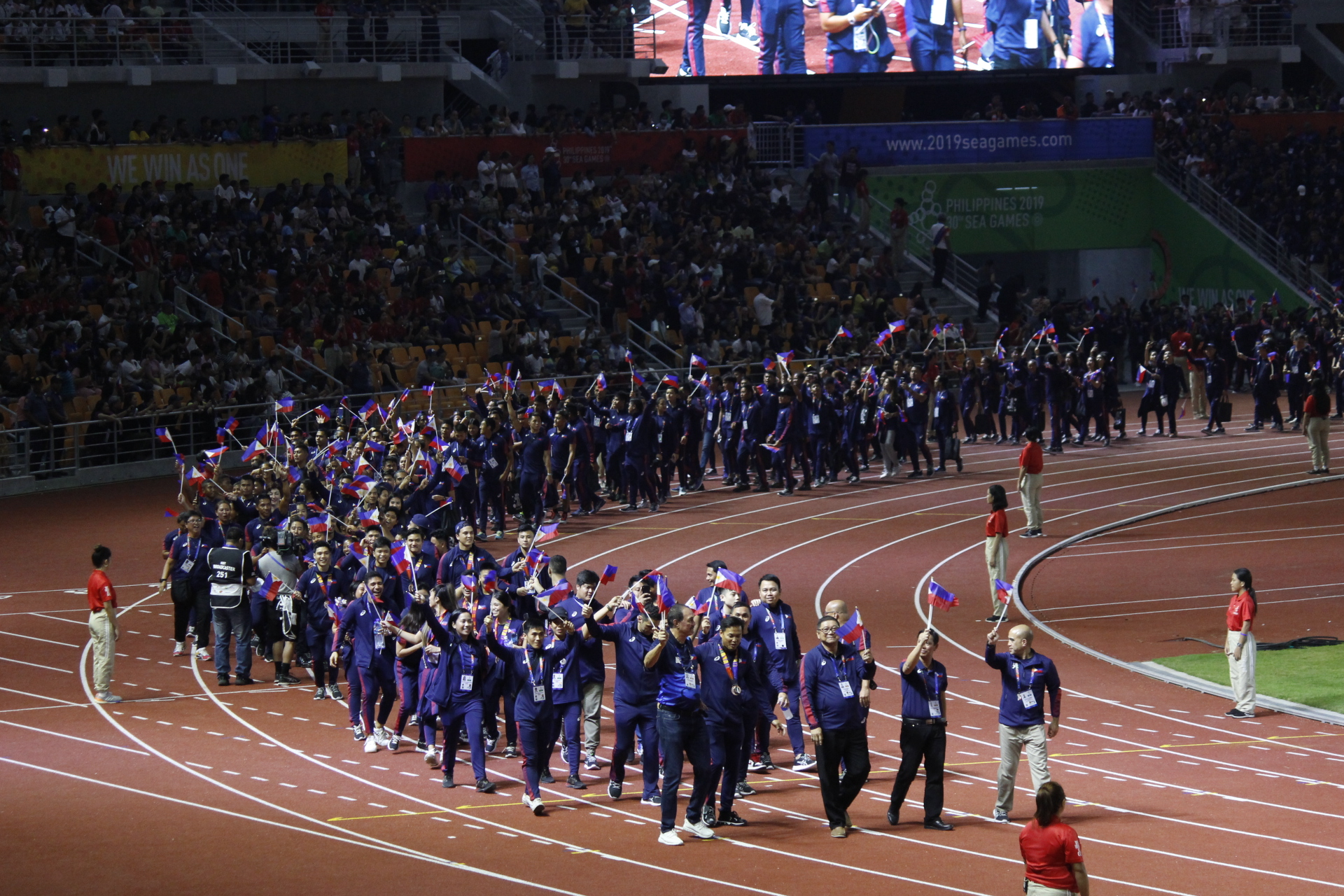
Closing Ceremony of the 2019 Southeast Asian Games

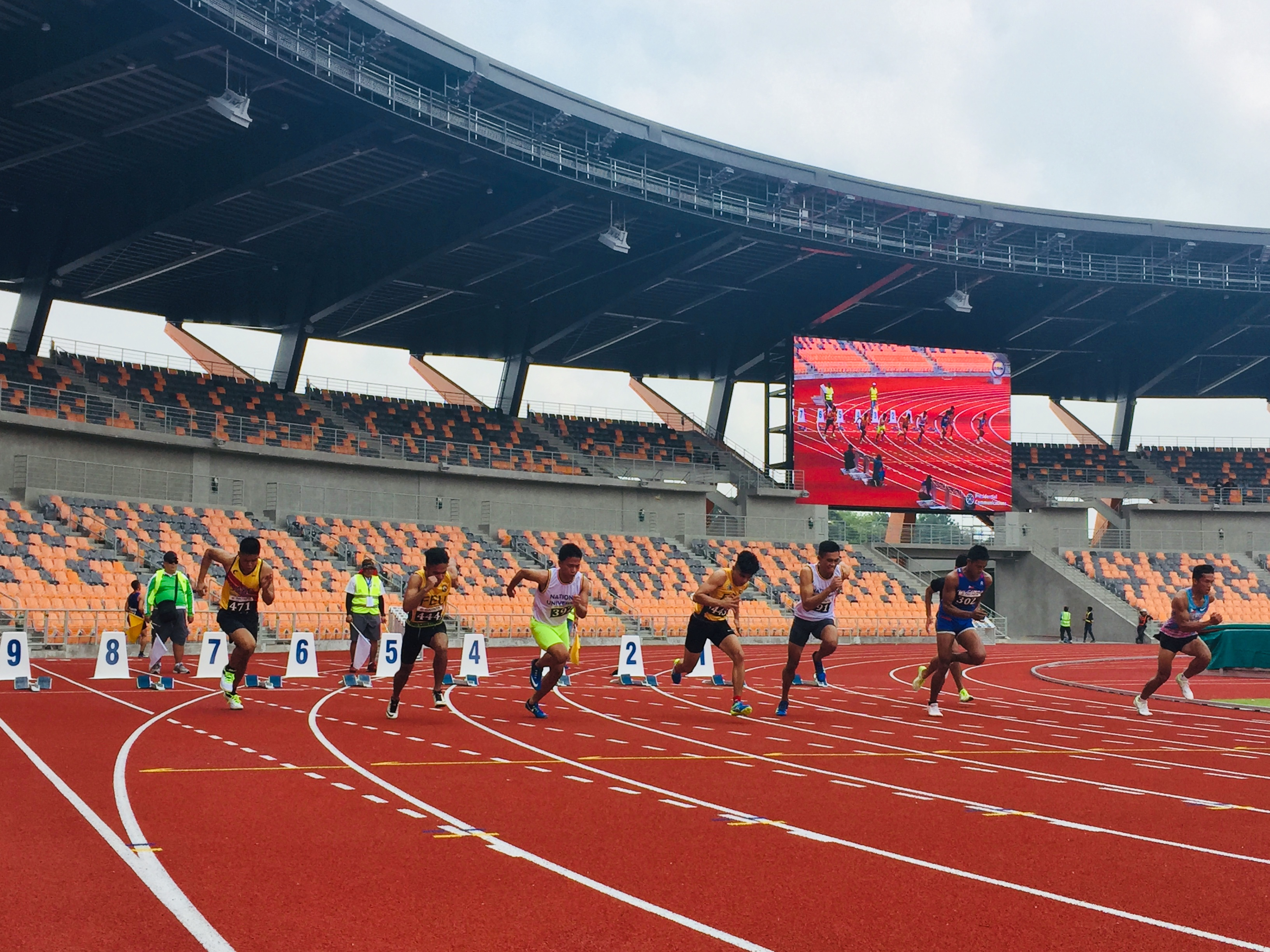
Final leg of the PATAFA weekly relay in 2019.

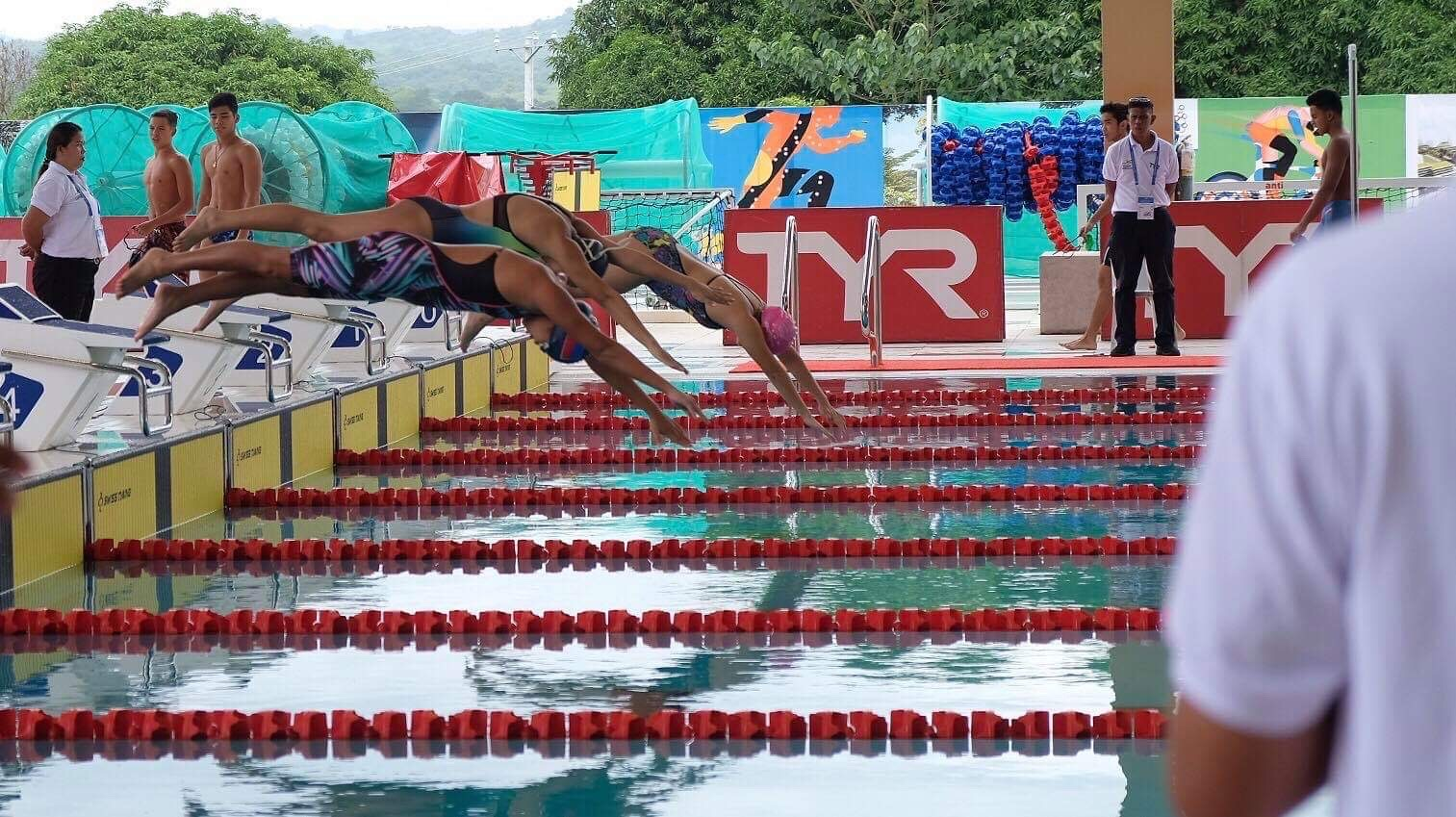
Swimmers competing at the 2019 Philippine Swimming National Open.

New Clark City is a planned community currently undergoing development, located within the Clark Special Economic Zone in the towns of Bamban and Capas in Tarlac province, Philippines. It is owned and managed by the Bases Conversion and Development Authority (BCDA).

The New Clark City Sports Hub located within the National Government Administrative Center contains an athletes' village, an aquatics center and a 20,000-seater athletics stadium. New Clark City was one of the host cities of the 2019 Southeast Asian Games, which took place all over Luzon. A list of major sporting events are given in the tables below in chronological order.

== List of sporting events held ==
=== 2019 ===
Date	Event name	Location	Organizations	Ref
August 31–September 3	1st Philippine National Open Swimming Championships	Aquatics Center	Philippine Swimming, Inc. (PSI)	
September 1, 22, and 29	Philippine Athletics Track and Field Association (PATAFA) Weekly Relay Series	Athletics Stadium	PATAFA	
October 18–20	New Clark City Triathlon	Aquatics Center, Athletics Stadium and Athletics Warm-up Track Oval	GoClark Sports and Events and BCDA	
November 30 – December 11	2019 SEA Games	Aquatics Center and Athletics Stadium	Southeast Asian Games Federation	

=== 2020–2021 ===
Date	Event name	Location	Organizations	Ref
2020
February 3–8	State Colleges and Universities Athletics Association (SCUAA) III Olympics	Aquatics Center and Athletics Stadium	SCUAA	
2021
October 22–24	2021 Philippine Swimming Inc. National Selection Bubble	Aquatics Center	PSI	

=== 2022 ===
Date	Event name	Location	Organizations	Ref
March 26–27	2022 FINIS Short Course Swim Competition Series – Luzon leg	Aquatics Center	FINIS Philippines	
March 27	FINIS Kids of Steel Triathlon	Aquatics Center and Open Roads	FINIS Philippines	
April 23	80th Central Northern Luzon-Cordillera Administrative Region Swimming Coaches Association (CNLCSCA) Swim Series	Aquatics Center	CNLCSCA and AC Dax Aquatics Swim Club	
May 29	1st New Clark City Cycling Race	New Clark City Open Roads	Twin Cycle Gear	
June 11	1st Spartan Stadion Philippines	Athletics Stadium	Spartan Race Philippines	
June 25–26	83rd CNLCSCA Swim Series	Aquatics Center	CNLCSCA	
July 17	New Clark City Duathlon	Athletics Stadium and Open Roads	GoClark Sports and Events	
August 6–7	85th CNLCSCA Invitational Friendship Meet	Aquatics Center	CNLCSCA	
August 20–21	FINIS Short Course National Finals	Aquatics Center	FINIS Philippines	
August 27–28	Clark Cycling Classics	Open Roads	GoClark Sports and Events	
August 27–29	PSI Long Course Grand Prix Qualifying Series CNL - CAR	Aquatics Center	PSI	
August 28	Ride for Valor	Open Roads	Philippine Veterans Bank	
September 10–11	86th CNLCSCA Swim Series	Aquatics Center	CNLCSCA	
September 24–25	RLC Residences New Clark City Triathlon	Aquatics Center, Athletics Stadium and Open Roads	GoClark Sports and Events	
October 13–16	PSI Long Course Grand Prix National Championships	Aquatics Center	PSI	
October 22	2022–23 Philippines Football League - UCFC vs ADT	Athletics Stadium	Philippines Football League	
October 23	4th Bangko Sentral ng Pilipinas (BSP) Triathlon	Aquatics Center and Athletics Stadium	BSP	
November 5	2022–23 Philippines Football League - UCFC vs Stallion Laguna	Athletics Stadium	Philippines Football League	
November 12–13	2022 PSI Short Course National Championship	Aquatics Center	PSI	
November 26–27	FINIS Long Course Swimming Competition (Luzon Leg)	Aquatics Center	FINIS Philippines	
November 27	Grabeng Gravel Challenge 2022	Open Roads	Rotary Club of Makati San Antonio	
December 4	2022 National Duathlon Championships	Athletics Stadium and Open Roads	Triathlon Association of the Philippines (TRAP)	
December 17–18	FINIS Long Course Swim Competition Series	Aquatics Center	FINIS Philippines	
December 18	Team Bro Events Duathlon Race	Athletics Stadium and Open Roads	Team Bro Events	

=== 2023 ===
Date	Event name	Location	Organizations	Ref
January 21–22	2023 Philippine Swimming League National Championships	Aquatics Center	Philippine Swimming League	
February 11–12	91st CNLCSCA Swim Series - Luzon Swim Series 1	Aquatics Center	CNLCSCA	
February 16–19	2023 SEA Games Swimming Qualifying Event	Aquatics Center	Philippine Olympic Committee	
February 19	1st Century Gravel Challenge	Open Grounds	Ultra Gravel PH	
February 24–26	17th BOSS Ironman Motorcycle Challenge	Open Grounds	BOSS Ironman	
March 11–12	Clark International Football Academy (CIFA) Cup 2023	Athletics Stadium	CIFA	
April 15	Sun Racing Cup	Open roads	Turbo Racing	
May 20	Pho3nix Kids Duathlon Race	Open roads	GoClark Sports and Events	
May 21	2023 New Clark City Duathlon	Athletics Stadium and Open roads	GoClark Sports and Events	
June 25	2023 Philippine Rally Cross	Open roads	Philippine Rallycross Series	
July 15	2nd Spartan Stadion Philippines	Athletics Stadium	Spartan Race Philippines	
August 19–21	CNL-CAR Grand Prix 2023 Invitational Meet	Aquatics Center	CNLCSCA	
September 2–3	Philippine Executive Road (PERC) Cycling Club	Open roads	PERC	
September 16	101st CNLCSCA Swim Series	Aquatics Center	CNLCSCA	
September 29 - October 1	AIDA Philippines National Freediving Pool Championship 2023	Aquatics Center	International Association for the Development of Apnea (AIDA)	
October 1–3	SCUAA Games 2023	Aquatics Center and Athletics Stadium	SCUAA	
October 8	5th BSP Triathlon 2023	Aquatics Center, Athletics Stadium, Open Roads	BSP	
October 14	2023 Pho3nix Kids Duathlon	Open Roads	Pho3nix Kids Philippines and GoClark Sports and Events	
October 15	2023 New Clark City Triathlon	Aquatics Center, Athletics Stadium, Open Roads	GoClark Sports and Events	
November 8–12	22nd Asia Masters Athletics Championships	Athletics Stadium	Asia Masters Athletics	
November 13	CLiQQ to 7-Eleven: Color Fun Run	Open roads	7-Eleven Philippines	
November 25–26	2023 Asia Triathlon Duathlon Championship	Athletics Stadium and Open roads	TRAP	
December 17	2023 New Clark City Half-Marathon	Open roads	Run Rio	

=== 2024 ===
Date	Event name	Location	Organizations	Ref
February 26 – March 9	2024 Asian Age Group Aquatics Championships	Aquatics Center	Asia Swimming Federation	
November 17–21	UAAP Season 87 Athletics Championships	Athletics Stadium	UAAP	
November 17–20	UAAP Season 87 Swimming Championships	Aquatics Center	UAAP	
