= Philippines at the 2015 World Aquatics Championships =

- Flag of the Philippines
- FINA code: PHI
- National federation: Philippine Swimming Federation
- Website: www.swimmingpinas.com

in Kazan, Russia
- Competitors: 4 in 1 sport
- Medals: Gold 0 Silver 0 Bronze 0 Total 0

World Aquatics Championships appearances
- 1973; 1975; 1978; 1982; 1986; 1991; 1994; 1998; 2001; 2003; 2005; 2007; 2009; 2011; 2013; 2015; 2017; 2019; 2022; 2023; 2024

Philippines competed at the 2015 World Aquatics Championships in Kazan, Russia from 24 July to 9 August 2015.

== Swimming ==
Philippine swimmers have achieved qualifying standards in the following events (up to a maximum of 2 swimmers in each event at the A-standard entry time, and 1 at the B-standard):

Men

Athlete	Event	Heat		Semifinal		Final	
Athlete	Event	Time	Rank	Time	Rank	Time	Rank
Joshua Hall	50 m breaststroke	DSQ		did not advance			
Joshua Hall	100 m breaststroke	1:02.40	41	did not advance			
Jessie Lacuna	200 m freestyle	1:51.85	54	did not advance			
Jessie Lacuna	400 m freestyle	4:01.61	57	—		did not advance	
Jessie Lacuna	200 m butterfly	2:03.84	32	did not advance			
Jessie Lacuna	200 m individual medley	2:07.51	40	did not advance			

Women

Athlete	Event	Heat		Semifinal		Final	
Athlete	Event	Time	Rank	Time	Rank	Time	Rank
Jasmine Alkhaldi	50 m freestyle	26.15	45	did not advance			
Jasmine Alkhaldi	100 m freestyle	56.40	=39	did not advance			
Jasmine Alkhaldi	200 m freestyle	2:01.81	=36	did not advance			
Jasmine Alkhaldi	50 m butterfly	28.16	40	did not advance			
Jasmine Alkhaldi	100 m butterfly	1:02.37	42	did not advance			
Roxanne Yu	100 m backstroke	1:06.10	51	did not advance			
Roxanne Yu	200 m backstroke	2:19.45	38	did not advance			
