= Philippines at the 2022 World Aquatics Championships =

- Flag of the Philippines
- FINA code: PHI
- National federation: Philippine Swimming
- Website: www.philippineswimming.org

in Budapest, Hungary
- Competitors: 3
- Medals: Gold 0 Silver 0 Bronze 0 Total 0

World Aquatics Championships appearances
- 1973; 1975; 1978; 1982; 1986; 1991; 1994; 1998; 2001; 2003; 2005; 2007; 2009; 2011; 2013; 2015; 2017; 2019; 2022; 2023; 2024

The Philippines competed at the 2022 World Aquatics Championships in Budapest, Hungary from 18 June to 3 July.

== Swimming ==
Philippines entered three swimmers.

The country initially qualified six swimmers. The three other swimmers were Jerard Jacinto, Luke Gebbie, and Chloe Isleta. Jacinto did not enter citing medical reason while Gebbie was rendered unavailable due to an injury and was replaced by Jonathan Cook. Isleta was rendered ineligible due to technicalities regarding the entry of swimmers based on the method of qualification (standard entry time or minimum FINA points).

The national federation has set an initial target for the three athletes to reach the top 16 in their respective events.

Men

Athlete	Event	Heat		Semifinal		Final	
Athlete	Event	Time	Rank	Time	Rank	Time	Rank
Jonathan Cook	100 m breaststroke	1:03.95	43	did not advance			
Jonathan Cook	200 m breaststroke	2:19.95	33	did not advance			

Women

Athlete	Event	Heat		Semifinal		Final	
Athlete	Event	Time	Rank	Time	Rank	Time	Rank
Jasmine Alkhaldi	50 m freestyle	26.20	32	did not advance			
Jasmine Alkhaldi	100 m butterfly	1:01.34	21	did not advance			
Miranda Renner	50 m butterfly	27.22	32	did not advance			
Miranda Renner	100 m freestyle	57.80	31	did not advance			
