= Philippines at the 2017 World Aquatics Championships =

- Flag of the Philippines
- FINA code: PHI
- National federation: Philippine Swimming Federation
- Website: www.swimmingpinas.com

in Budapest, Hungary
- Competitors: 7 in 2 sports
- Medals: Gold 0 Silver 0 Bronze 0 Total 0

World Aquatics Championships appearances
- 1973; 1975; 1978; 1982; 1986; 1991; 1994; 1998; 2001; 2003; 2005; 2007; 2009; 2011; 2013; 2015; 2017; 2019; 2022; 2023; 2024

The Philippines is scheduled to compete at the 2017 World Aquatics Championships in Budapest, Hungary from 14 July to 30 July.

== Swimming ==
The Philippines has received a Universality invitation from FINA to send a maximum of four swimmers (two men and two women) to the World Championships.

Athlete	Event	Heat		Semifinal		Final	
Athlete	Event	Time	Rank	Time	Rank	Time	Rank
James Deiparine	Men's 50 m breaststroke	28.13	=36	did not advance			
James Deiparine	Men's 100 m breaststroke	1:03.22	49	did not advance			
Jessie Lacuna	Men's 400 m freestyle	4:05.39	47	—		did not advance	
Jessie Lacuna	Men's 200 m individual medley	2:08.31	39	did not advance			
Jasmine Alkhaldi	Women's 100 m freestyle	56.70	36	did not advance			
Jasmine Alkhaldi	Women's 100 m butterfly	1:01.80	35	did not advance			
Nicole Oliva	Women's 200 m freestyle	2:05.55	36	did not advance			
Nicole Oliva	Women's 400 m freestyle	4:19.23	24	—		did not advance	
James Deiparine; Jessie Lacuna; Jasmine Alkhaldi; Nicole Oliva	Mixed 4×100 m medley relay	4:03.11	16	—		did not advance	

== Synchronized swimming ==
The Philippines' synchronized swimming team consisted of 3 athletes (3 female).

Women

Athlete	Event	Preliminaries		Final	
Athlete	Event	Points	Rank	Points	Rank
Ruth Abiera; Arnie Ladjai	Duet technical routine	55.5266	40	did not advance	
Allyssa Salvador; Jemimah Tiambeng	Duet free routine	57.5333	43	did not advance	
