= Philippines at the 2013 World Aquatics Championships =

- Flag of the Philippines
- FINA code: PHI
- National federation: Philippine Swimming Federation
- Website: www.swimmingpinas.com

in Barcelona, Spain
- Competitors: 3 in 1 sports
- Medals: Gold 0 Silver 0 Bronze 0 Total 0

World Aquatics Championships appearances
- 1973; 1975; 1978; 1982; 1986; 1991; 1994; 1998; 2001; 2003; 2005; 2007; 2009; 2011; 2013; 2015; 2017; 2019; 2022; 2023; 2024

The Philippines is competing at the 2013 World Aquatics Championships in Barcelona, Spain between 19 July and 4 August 2013.

== Swimming ==
Filipino swimmers achieved qualifying standards in the following events (up to a maximum of 2 swimmers in each event at the A-standard entry time, and 1 at the B-standard):

Men

Athlete	Event	Heat		Semifinal		Final	
Athlete	Event	Time	Rank	Time	Rank	Time	Rank
Joshua Hall	50 m breaststroke	28.48 NR	=45	did not advance			
Joshua Hall	100 m breaststroke	1:02.87 NR	45	did not advance			
Joshua Hall	200 m breaststroke	2:19.16	38	did not advance			
Jessie Lacuna	100 m freestyle	52.10	51	did not advance			
Jessie Lacuna	200 m freestyle	1:51.76	40	did not advance			
Jessie Lacuna	100 m butterfly	55.92	40	did not advance			

Women

Athlete	Event	Heat		Semifinal		Final	
Athlete	Event	Time	Rank	Time	Rank	Time	Rank
Jasmine Alkhaldi	100 m freestyle	56.37 NR	35	did not advance			
Jasmine Alkhaldi	100 m butterfly	1:01.71 NR	35	did not advance			
