= Philippines at the 2024 World Aquatics Championships =

- Flag of the Philippines
- FINA code: PHI
- National federation: Philippine Aquatics
- Website: www.philippineaquatics.com

in Doha, Qatar
- Competitors: 7 in 1 sport
- Medals: Gold 0 Silver 0 Bronze 0 Total 0

World Aquatics Championships appearances
- 1973; 1975; 1978; 1982; 1986; 1991; 1994; 1998; 2001; 2003; 2005; 2007; 2009; 2011; 2013; 2015; 2017; 2019; 2022; 2023; 2024

The Philippines competed at the 2024 World Aquatics Championships in Doha, Qatar from 2 to 18 February.

This marks the country's return to the World Aquatic Championships after its athletes along with Kenya's competed as neutral athletes under the banner of "Suspended Member Federation" in 2023 as a consequence for the suspension of Philippine Swimming, the FINA recognized national federation for the Philippines at the time. The 2024 edition also marked the first time the country would be competing under the auspices of the newly formed federation Philippine Aquatics.

== Swimming ==
Philippines entered seven swimmers. A new Philippine national record was set for the Mixed 4 × 100 metre medley relay event.

Men

Athlete	Event	Heat		Semifinal		Final	
Athlete	Event	Time	Rank	Time	Rank	Time	Rank
Jarod Hatch	50 m butterfly	24.13	30	did not advance			
Jarod Hatch	100 m butterfly	53.75	32	did not advance			
Jerard Jacinto	50 m backstroke	25.92	23	did not advance			
Jerard Jacinto	100 m backstroke	57.18	35	did not advance			

Women

Athlete	Event	Heat		Semifinal		Final	
Athlete	Event	Time	Rank	Time	Rank	Time	Rank
Jasmine Alkhaldi	50 m freestyle	26.14	41	did not advance			
Jasmine Alkhaldi	50 m butterfly	27.32	30	did not advance			
Xiandi Chua	400 m medley	4:51.01	18	did not advance			
Xiandi Chua	200 m backstroke	2:15.01	21	did not advance			
Thanya Dela Cruz	50 m breaststroke	31.27	17	did not advance			
Thanya Dela Cruz	100 m breaststroke	1:09.12	26	did not advance			
Teia Salvino	100 m backstroke	1:02.81	28	did not advance			
Teia Salvino	200 m freestyle	2:08.02	38	did not advance			
Kayla Sanchez	100 m freestyle	54.88	15 Q	55.07	15	did not advance	
Teia Salvino; Jasmine Alkhaldi; Thanya Dela Cruz; Kayla Sanchez	4 × 100 m medley relay	4:11.95	17	did not advance			
Kayla Sanchez; Jasmine Alkhaldi; Xiandi Chua; Teia Salvino	4 × 100 m freestyle relay	3:46.93	12	did not advance			
No listed swimmers	4 × 200 m freestyle relay	DNS	—	did not advance			

Mixed

Athlete	Event	Heat		Semifinal		Final	
Athlete	Event	Time	Rank	Time	Rank	Time	Rank
Jerard Jacinto; Thanya Dela Cruz; Jarod Hatch; Kayla Sanchez	4 × 100 m medley relay	3:53.91	16 NR	did not advance			
Jarod Hatch; Kayla Sanchez; Teia Salvino; Jerard Jacinto	4 × 100 m freestyle relay	3:36.53	9	did not advance			
