= 2023 Asian Water Polo Championship =

International water polo competition

- Host city: Singapore
- Dates: 22–27 March 2023
- Main venue: OCBC Aquatic Centre

The 2023 Asian Water Polo Championship was held from 22 to 27 March 2023 in Singapore. It was the Asian continental qualification for the 2023 FINA Men's Water Polo World Cup.

== Men's tournament ==
=== Preliminary round ===
==== Group A ====
Pos	Team	Pld	W	PW	PL	L	GF	GA	GD	Pts
1	China	3	3	0	0	0	68	14	+54	9
2	Thailand	3	1	1	0	1	40	47	−7	5
3	Singapore	3	1	0	1	1	28	51	−23	4
4	Uzbekistan	3	0	0	0	3	27	51	−24	0

Source: total-waterpolo.com

22 March; 16:30	Uzbekistan	9–17	Thailand	OCBC Aquatic Centre, Singapore

22 March; 19:30	Singapore	1–23	China	OCBC Aquatic Centre, Singapore

23 March; 16:30	Uzbekistan	8–23	China	OCBC Aquatic Centre, Singapore

23 March; 19:30	Singapore	16–18 (PSO) (PSO)	Thailand	OCBC Aquatic Centre, Singapore

24 March; 18:00	Thailand	5–22	China	OCBC Aquatic Centre, Singapore

24 March; 19:30	Uzbekistan	10–11	Singapore	OCBC Aquatic Centre, Singapore

==== Group B ====
Pos	Team	Pld	W	PW	PL	L	GF	GA	GD	Pts
1	Iran	3	2	1	0	0	55	21	+34	8
2	Kazakhstan	3	2	0	1	0	55	28	+27	7
3	Hong Kong	3	1	0	0	2	24	51	−27	3
4	Philippines	3	0	0	0	3	25	59	−34	0

Source: total-waterpolo.com

22 March; 15:00	Hong Kong	2–15	Iran	OCBC Aquatic Centre, Singapore

22 March; 18:00	Kazakhstan	19–6	Philippines	OCBC Aquatic Centre, Singapore

23 March; 15:00	Hong Kong	15–14	Philippines	OCBC Aquatic Centre, Singapore

23 March; 18:00	Kazakhstan	14–15 (PSO) (PSO)	Iran	OCBC Aquatic Centre, Singapore

24 March; 15:00	Hong Kong	7–22	Kazakhstan	OCBC Aquatic Centre, Singapore

24 March; 16:30	Iran	25–5	Philippines	OCBC Aquatic Centre, Singapore

=== Final round ===
Quarterfinals
25 March
Thailand	21
Hong Kong	9
25 March
Uzbekistan	8
Iran	18
25 March
Singapore	7
Kazakhstan	10
25 March
China	27
Philippines	4

Semifinals
26 March
Thailand	9
Iran	20
26 March
Kazakhstan	1
China	10

Final
27 March
Iran	8
China	11
Bronze medal match
27 March
Thailand	7
Kazakhstan	18

Classification 5th–8th
26 March
Hong Kong	11
Uzbekistan	12
26 March
Singapore	18
Philippines	6

5th place match
27 March
Uzbekistan	11
Singapore	12
7th place match
27 March
Hong Kong	10
Philippines	12

==== Quarterfinals ====
25 March; 15:00	Thailand	21–9	Hong Kong	OCBC Aquatic Centre, Singapore

25 March; 16:30	China	27–4	Philippines	OCBC Aquatic Centre, Singapore

25 March; 18:00	Singapore	7–10	Kazakhstan	OCBC Aquatic Centre, Singapore

25 March; 19:30	Uzbekistan	8–18	Iran	OCBC Aquatic Centre, Singapore

==== Classification 5th–8th ====
26 March; 15:00	Hong Kong	11–12	Uzbekistan	OCBC Aquatic Centre, Singapore

26 March; 16:30	Singapore	18–6	Philippines	OCBC Aquatic Centre, Singapore

==== Semifinals ====
26 March; 18:00	Thailand	9–20	Iran	OCBC Aquatic Centre, Singapore

26 March; 19:30	Kazakhstan	1–10	China	OCBC Aquatic Centre, Singapore

==== 7th place match ====
27 March; 12:30	Hong Kong	10–12	Philippines	OCBC Aquatic Centre, Singapore

==== 5th place match ====
27 March; 14:00	Uzbekistan	11–12	Singapore	OCBC Aquatic Centre, Singapore

==== Bronze medal match ====
27 March; 15:30	Thailand	7–18	Kazakhstan	OCBC Aquatic Centre, Singapore

==== Final ====
27 March; 17:00	Iran	8–11	China	OCBC Aquatic Centre, Singapore

== Women's tournament ==
Pos	Team	Pld	W	PW	PL	L	GF	GA	GD	Pts
1	Kazakhstan	6	6	0	0	0	77	42	+35	18
2	Thailand	6	3	0	0	3	58	64	−6	9
3	Uzbekistan	6	2	0	0	4	58	64	−6	6
4	Singapore	6	1	0	0	5	37	60	−23	3

Source: total-waterpolo.com

22 March; 9:30	Thailand	13–16	Uzbekistan	OCBC Aquatic Centre, Singapore

22 March; 11:00	Singapore	7–12	Kazakhstan	OCBC Aquatic Centre, Singapore

23 March; 9:30	Kazakhstan	16–10	Thailand	OCBC Aquatic Centre, Singapore

23 March; 11:00	Uzbekistan	11–10	Singapore	OCBC Aquatic Centre, Singapore

24 March; 9:30	Kazakhstan	11–9	Uzbekistan	OCBC Aquatic Centre, Singapore

24 March; 11:00	Thailand	8–6	Singapore	OCBC Aquatic Centre, Singapore

25 March; 9:30	Thailand	10–9	Uzbekistan	OCBC Aquatic Centre, Singapore

25 March; 11:00	Singapore	2–13	Kazakhstan	OCBC Aquatic Centre, Singapore

26 March; 9:30	Kazakhstan	13–8	Thailand	OCBC Aquatic Centre, Singapore

26 March; 11:00	Uzbekistan	7–8	Singapore	OCBC Aquatic Centre, Singapore

27 March; 8:30	Kazakhstan	12–6	Uzbekistan	OCBC Aquatic Centre, Singapore

27 March; 10:00	Thailand	9–4	Singapore	OCBC Aquatic Centre, Singapore
