= Water polo at the 2014 Asian Games – Women's tournament =

Women at the 2014 Asian Games
- Venue: Dream Park Aquatics Center
- Date: 20–24 September 2014
- Competitors: 77 from 6 nations

Medalists
gold medal	China
silver medal	Japan
bronze medal	Kazakhstan

The women's water polo at the 2014 Asian Games was held in Dream Park Aquatics Center, Incheon, Korea from 20 September to 24 September 2014. China won the round robin competition and the gold medal. Japan, which tied with Kazakhstan in both competition points and their head-to-head match, was awarded the silver medal based on having better head-to-head result against the highest ranked team China.

== Squads ==
China	Hong Kong	Japan	Kazakhstan
Yang Jun; Li Shujin; Liu Ping; Sun Yujun; Chen Huili; Sun Yating; Song Donglun; Zhang Cong; Zhao Zihan; Tian Jianing; Wang Xinyan; Lu Yiwen; Peng Lin	Cindy Ho; Chan Sze Ting; Wong Hei Ting; Kot Chung Ling; Ng Wai Yiu; Chung Sin Yu; Joanne Shum; Yeung Sze Wai; Mak Lee Sze; Sabrina Kwan; Amanda Yeung; Junie Chuang; Leung Siu Suet	Rikako Miura; Midori Sugiyama; Saki Ogawa; Shino Magariyama; Moe Nakata; Ayaka Takahashi; Yumi Nakano; Misa Shiga; Yumi Kojo; Tsubasa Mori; Erina Kakiichi; Mitsuki Hashiguchi; Yuko Umeda	Alexandra Zharkova; Natalya Shepelina; Aizhan Akilbayeva; Anna Turova; Kamila Zakirova; Anastassiya Mirshina; Zamira Myrzabekova; Oxana Saichuk; Assel Jakayeva; Marina Gritsenko; Natalya Alexandrova; Aruzhan Yegemberdiyeva; Kristina Krassikova
Singapore	Uzbekistan		
Low Seet Teng; Gina Koh; Tan Su Lynn; Mary Kan; Adelyn Yew; Angeline Teo; Neo Ser Han; Lynette Jane Tan; Ng Yi Wen; Denise Chen; Loke En Yuan; Ong Cheng Jing; Eunice Karina Fu	Elena Dukhanova; Diana Dadabaeva; Aleksandra Sarancha; Angelina Djumalieva; Eseniya Piftor; Liliya Umarova; Natalya Plyusova; Anna Shcheglova; Ramilya Khalikova; Adelina Zinurova; Nellya Dadabaeva; Kamila Abdeeva		

== Results ==
All times are Korea Standard Time (UTC+09:00)

Pos	Team	Pld	W	D	L	GF	GA	GD	Pts
1	China	5	5	0	0	86	25	+61	10
2	Japan	5	3	1	1	79	32	+47	7 (Note: Head-to-head result: JPN 7–7 KAZ. Goal difference against the highest placed team (CHN): JPN −5, KAZ −5. Goals scored against the highest placed team: JPN 10, KAZ 6.)
3	Kazakhstan	5	3	1	1	79	28	+51	7
4	Uzbekistan	5	2	0	3	45	45	0	4
5	Singapore	5	1	0	4	22	92	−70	2
6	Hong Kong	5	0	0	5	11	100	−89	0

Source: Results
Notes:

20 September; 15:00	Singapore	4–12	Uzbekistan	Dream Park Aquatics Center, Incheon; Referees: Stavridis (GRE), Wang (CHN)
20 September; 15:00	Score by quarters: 2–3, 1–4, 0–3, 1–2			Dream Park Aquatics Center, Incheon; Referees: Stavridis (GRE), Wang (CHN)
20 September; 15:00	four players 1	Goals	Plyusova 5	Dream Park Aquatics Center, Incheon; Referees: Stavridis (GRE), Wang (CHN)

20 September; 17:00	Hong Kong	1–25	Kazakhstan	Dream Park Aquatics Center, Incheon; Referees: Alexandrescu (ROU), Lee (KOR)
20 September; 17:00	Score by quarters: 0–8, 0–5, 1–7, 0–5			Dream Park Aquatics Center, Incheon; Referees: Alexandrescu (ROU), Lee (KOR)
20 September; 17:00	Yeung S. 1	Goals	Akilbayeva 5	Dream Park Aquatics Center, Incheon; Referees: Alexandrescu (ROU), Lee (KOR)

20 September; 19:00	China	15–10	Japan	Dream Park Aquatics Center, Incheon; Referees: Borrell (ESP), Periš (CRO)
20 September; 19:00	Score by quarters: 4–4, 3–1, 4–3, 4–2			Dream Park Aquatics Center, Incheon; Referees: Borrell (ESP), Periš (CRO)
20 September; 19:00	Sun Ya., Zhao 3	Goals	Nakano, Shiga 4	Dream Park Aquatics Center, Incheon; Referees: Borrell (ESP), Periš (CRO)

21 September; 15:00	Uzbekistan	7–14	Kazakhstan	Dream Park Aquatics Center, Incheon; Referees: Tan (SIN), Fukumoto (JPN)
21 September; 15:00	Score by quarters: 2–1, 3–7, 1–3, 1–3			Dream Park Aquatics Center, Incheon; Referees: Tan (SIN), Fukumoto (JPN)
21 September; 15:00	Sarancha, Plyusova 2	Goals	Shepelina, Myrzabekova, Jakayeva 3	Dream Park Aquatics Center, Incheon; Referees: Tan (SIN), Fukumoto (JPN)

21 September; 17:00	Japan	27–3	Hong Kong	Dream Park Aquatics Center, Incheon; Referees: Salnichenko (KAZ), Lee (KOR)
21 September; 17:00	Score by quarters: 5–1, 6–0, 6–1, 10–1			Dream Park Aquatics Center, Incheon; Referees: Salnichenko (KAZ), Lee (KOR)
21 September; 17:00	Mori 6	Goals	Chung 2	Dream Park Aquatics Center, Incheon; Referees: Salnichenko (KAZ), Lee (KOR)

21 September; 19:00	Singapore	3–26	China	Dream Park Aquatics Center, Incheon; Referees: Sadikov (UZB), Simonyan (HKG)
21 September; 19:00	Score by quarters: 0–5, 0–10, 1–5, 2–6			Dream Park Aquatics Center, Incheon; Referees: Sadikov (UZB), Simonyan (HKG)
21 September; 19:00	Teo, Tan, Loke 1	Goals	Tian 5	Dream Park Aquatics Center, Incheon; Referees: Sadikov (UZB), Simonyan (HKG)

22 September; 15:00	Kazakhstan	7–7	Japan	Dream Park Aquatics Center, Incheon; Referees: Borrell (ESP), Stavridis (GRE)
22 September; 15:00	Score by quarters: 3–2, 1–3, 2–2, 1–0			Dream Park Aquatics Center, Incheon; Referees: Borrell (ESP), Stavridis (GRE)
22 September; 15:00	Shepelina, Mirshina 2	Goals	Nakano 3	Dream Park Aquatics Center, Incheon; Referees: Borrell (ESP), Stavridis (GRE)

22 September; 17:00	China	14–4	Uzbekistan	Dream Park Aquatics Center, Incheon; Referees: Simonyan (HKG), Alexandrescu (ROU)
22 September; 17:00	Score by quarters: 5–2, 2–2, 5–0, 2–0			Dream Park Aquatics Center, Incheon; Referees: Simonyan (HKG), Alexandrescu (ROU)
22 September; 17:00	Zhao 5	Goals	Sarancha 2	Dream Park Aquatics Center, Incheon; Referees: Simonyan (HKG), Alexandrescu (ROU)

22 September; 19:00	Hong Kong	4–12	Singapore	Dream Park Aquatics Center, Incheon; Referees: Wang (CHN), Periš (CRO)
22 September; 19:00	Score by quarters: 1–2, 1–2, 2–4, 0–4			Dream Park Aquatics Center, Incheon; Referees: Wang (CHN), Periš (CRO)
22 September; 19:00	Chan 4	Goals	Chen 4	Dream Park Aquatics Center, Incheon; Referees: Wang (CHN), Periš (CRO)

23 September; 15:00	Uzbekistan	6–12	Japan	Dream Park Aquatics Center, Incheon; Referees: Alexandrescu (ROU), Borrell (ESP)
23 September; 15:00	Score by quarters: 0–3, 3–3, 1–2, 2–4			Dream Park Aquatics Center, Incheon; Referees: Alexandrescu (ROU), Borrell (ESP)
23 September; 15:00	Djumalieva, Khalikova 2	Goals	Nakano 4	Dream Park Aquatics Center, Incheon; Referees: Alexandrescu (ROU), Borrell (ESP)

23 September; 17:00	Singapore	2–27	Kazakhstan	Dream Park Aquatics Center, Incheon; Referees: Fukumoto (JPN), Periš (CRO)
23 September; 17:00	Score by quarters: 0–7, 2–8, 0–4, 0–8			Dream Park Aquatics Center, Incheon; Referees: Fukumoto (JPN), Periš (CRO)
23 September; 17:00	Tan, Loke 1	Goals	Akilbayeva 5	Dream Park Aquatics Center, Incheon; Referees: Fukumoto (JPN), Periš (CRO)

23 September; 19:00	China	20–2	Hong Kong	Dream Park Aquatics Center, Incheon; Referees: Sadikov (UZB), Salnichenko (KAZ)
23 September; 19:00	Score by quarters: 10–0, 5–1, 2–1, 3–0			Dream Park Aquatics Center, Incheon; Referees: Sadikov (UZB), Salnichenko (KAZ)
23 September; 19:00	Tian 6	Goals	Chan 2	Dream Park Aquatics Center, Incheon; Referees: Sadikov (UZB), Salnichenko (KAZ)

24 September; 14:00	Hong Kong	1–16	Uzbekistan	Dream Park Aquatics Center, Incheon; Referees: Lee (KOR), Tan (SIN)
24 September; 14:00	Score by quarters: 0–4, 0–4, 0–4, 1–4			Dream Park Aquatics Center, Incheon; Referees: Lee (KOR), Tan (SIN)
24 September; 14:00	Chan 1	Goals	Djumalieva, Umarova 3	Dream Park Aquatics Center, Incheon; Referees: Lee (KOR), Tan (SIN)

24 September; 16:00	Kazakhstan	6–11	China	Dream Park Aquatics Center, Incheon; Referees: Stavridis (GRE), Borrell (ESP)
24 September; 16:00	Score by quarters: 1–3, 3–5, 2–1, 0–2			Dream Park Aquatics Center, Incheon; Referees: Stavridis (GRE), Borrell (ESP)
24 September; 16:00	Turova, Gritsenko 2	Goals	Sun Yu. 3	Dream Park Aquatics Center, Incheon; Referees: Stavridis (GRE), Borrell (ESP)

24 September; 18:00	Singapore	1–23	Japan	Dream Park Aquatics Center, Incheon; Referees: Salnichenko (KAZ), Wang (CHN)
24 September; 18:00	Score by quarters: 0–7, 0–4, 1–7, 0–5			Dream Park Aquatics Center, Incheon; Referees: Salnichenko (KAZ), Wang (CHN)
24 September; 18:00	Loke 1	Goals	Nakano 4	Dream Park Aquatics Center, Incheon; Referees: Salnichenko (KAZ), Wang (CHN)

== Final standing ==
Rank	Team	Pld	W	D	L
1st place, gold medalist(s)	China	5	5	0	0
2nd place, silver medalist(s)	Japan	5	3	1	1
3rd place, bronze medalist(s)	Kazakhstan	5	3	1	1
4	Uzbekistan	5	2	0	3
5	Singapore	5	1	0	4
6	Hong Kong	5	0	0	5
