= Water polo at the 2017 SEA Games – Women's tournament =

Women's water polo tournament at the 2017 SEA Games
- Venue: National Aquatic Centre
- Dates: 15 – 19 August
- Competitors: 52 from 4 nations

Medalists
gold medal	Thailand (THA)
silver medal	Singapore (SIN)
bronze medal	Indonesia (INA)

The women's water polo tournament at the 2017 SEA Games were held at the National Aquatic Centre, Bukit Jalil, Kuala Lumpur from 15 to 20 August 2017. The competition will be held in a round-robin format, where the top 3 teams at the end of the competition will win the gold, silver, and bronze medal respectively.

== Competition schedule ==
The following was the competition schedule for the women's water polo competitions:

RR	Round robin

Tue 15	Wed 16	Thu 17	Fri 18	Sat 19
RR	RR			RR

== Squads ==
Indonesia (INA)	Malaysia (MAS)	Singapore (SIN)	Thailand (THA)
Ayudya Suidarwanty Pratiwi; Annisa Rachmawati; Alya Nadira Trifiansyah; Dewi Ratih; Ivy Nernie Priscilla; Hanna Firdaus; Upiet Sarimanah; Hudaidah Kadir; Inez Febrianti Rasyid; Nyoman Ayu Savitri Arsana; Rani Raida; Siti Balkis; Dinda Nur Asmarandana	Aileen Lim Zhixiang; Alicia Chin Tze Ling; Cheng Si Yeng; Fam Jia Shuan; Ili Gan Abdul Rahman Gan; Izyan Syaza Abdul Halim; Lim Jia Xin; Low Jia Yee; Low Yi Zhui; Mak Ai Sin; Mak Sin Sin; Sarah-Ann Thorp; Trisha Then Chiah Huey	Cleona Zhu Yinxuan; Gina Koh Ting Yi; Shauna Christine Sim Hwei Sian; Naomi Yap Xiao Fei; Koh Xiao Li; Loke En Yuan; Angeline Teo Yi Ling; Tan Hui Ying Lynnette Jane; Ng Yi Wen; Ooi Si Hui Melissa; Sheryl Tan Hui Ning; Wu Zhekang; Eunice Karina Fu Yumin	Alwani Sathitanon; Kaithip Saeteaw; Khemasiri Sirivejjabandh; Kornkarn Puengpongsakul; Nirawan Chompoopuen; Pranisa Nilklad; Pratchayaporn Nuch-Ong; Rojnaree Taweechai; Sarocha Rewrujirek; Sineenart Sonthipakdee; Thawanrat Wongpairoj; Thitirat Somyos; Varistha Saraikrarn

== Results ==
All times are Malaysia Standard Time (UTC+08:00)

=== Round-robin ===
Pos	Team	Pld	W	D	L	GF	GA	GD	Pts	Final Result
1	Thailand	3	3	0	0	39	7	+32	6	Gold medal
2	Singapore	3	2	0	1	20	17	+3	4	Silver medal
3	Indonesia	3	1	0	2	17	20	−3	2	Bronze medal
4	Malaysia (H)	3	0	0	3	9	41	−32	0	

Updated to match(es) played on 19 August 2017. Source: Schedule & Results
(H) Hosts

15 August; 15:00	Indonesia	6–7	Singapore	National Aquatic Centre, Bukit Jalil
15 August; 15:00	Score by quarters: 0–0, 1–2, 0–3, 5–2			National Aquatic Centre, Bukit Jalil

15 August; 17:00	Thailand	22–2	Malaysia	National Aquatic Centre, Bukit Jalil
15 August; 17:00	Score by quarters: 6–0, 5–1, 7–1, 4–0			National Aquatic Centre, Bukit Jalil

16 August; 15:00	Indonesia	4–12	Thailand	National Aquatic Centre, Bukit Jalil
16 August; 15:00	Score by quarters: 2–5, 0–2, 0–3, 2–2			National Aquatic Centre, Bukit Jalil

16 August; 17:00	Malaysia	6–12	Singapore	National Aquatic Centre, Bukit Jalil
16 August; 17:00	Score by quarters: 3–3, 0–2, 0–3, 3–4			National Aquatic Centre, Bukit Jalil

19 August; 09:00	Singapore	1–5	Thailand	National Aquatic Centre, Bukit Jalil
19 August; 09:00	Score by quarters: 0–1, 1–1, 0–2, 0–1			National Aquatic Centre, Bukit Jalil

19 August; 11:00	Indonesia	7–1	Malaysia	National Aquatic Centre, Bukit Jalil
19 August; 11:00	Score by quarters: 1–0, 3–0, 0–1, 3–0			National Aquatic Centre, Bukit Jalil

== Final standings ==
Rank	Team	Pld	W	D	L
1st place, gold medalist(s)	Thailand (THA)	3	3	0	0
2nd place, silver medalist(s)	Singapore (SIN)	3	2	0	1
3rd place, bronze medalist(s)	Indonesia (INA)	3	1	0	2
4	Malaysia (MAS)	3	0	0	3

== See also ==
- Men's tournament
