= Philippines at the 2019 World Aquatics Championships =

- Flag of the Philippines
- FINA code: PHI
- National federation: Philippine Swimming Federation
- Website: www.swimmingpinas.com

in Gwangju, South Korea
- Competitors: 4 in 1 sport

World Aquatics Championships appearances
- 1973; 1975; 1978; 1982; 1986; 1991; 1994; 1998; 2001; 2003; 2005; 2007; 2009; 2011; 2013; 2015; 2017; 2019; 2022; 2023; 2024

Philippines competed at the 2019 World Aquatics Championships in Gwangju, South Korea from 12 to 28 July. Four swimmers coached by Sherwin Santiago competed for the Philippines in the championships.

In this edition of the championships, Remedy Rule broke the Philippine national record for the women’s 100-meter butterfly set by Jasmine Alkhaldi (1:01.00) in the 2015 Southeast Asian Games.

== Swimming ==
Philippines entered four swimmers.

Men

Athlete	Event	Heat		Semifinal		Final	
Athlete	Event	Time	Rank	Time	Rank	Time	Rank
James Deiparine	50 m breaststroke	27.91	33	Did not advance			
James Deiparine	100 m breaststroke	1:02.84	51	Did not advance			
Luke Gebbie	50 m freestyle	23.26	58	Did not advance			
Luke Gebbie	100 m freestyle	49.94	42	Did not advance			

Women

Athlete	Event	Heat		Semifinal		Final	
Athlete	Event	Time	Rank	Time	Rank	Time	Rank
Nicole Oliva	200 m freestyle	2:04.26	34	Did not advance			
Nicole Oliva	400 m freestyle	4:20.03	31	Did not advance			
Nicole Oliva	800 m freestyle	8:55.50	32	Did not advance			
Remedy Rule	50 m freestyle	25.92	34	Did not advance			
Remedy Rule	100 m freestyle	56.13	36	Did not advance			
Remedy Rule	100 m butterfly	1:00.42	30	Did not advance			
Remedy Rule	200 m butterfly	2:11.38	19	Did not advance			

Mixed

Athlete	Event	Heat		Final	
Athlete	Event	Time	Rank	Time	Rank
Luke Gebbie; Nicole Oliva; James Deiparine; Remedy Rule	4×100 m freestyle relay	3:37.14	19	Did not start	
	4×100 m medley relay	DNS		Did not start	
