= Water polo at the 2019 SEA Games – Women's tournament =

Women's water polo tournament at the 2019 SEA Games
- Venue: New Clark City Aquatics Center
- Dates: 26 November – 1 December 2019
- Competitors: 36 from 3 nations

Medalists
gold medal	Thailand (THA)
silver medal	Singapore (SGP)
bronze medal	Philippines (PHI)

The women's water polo tournament at the 2019 SEA Games was held at the New Clark City Aquatics Center, Tarlac, Philippines from 26 November to 1 December 2019. The competition was held in a double round-robin format, where Thailand, winners of the previous two editions, dominated the three-team field en route to the gold medal.

== Competition schedule ==
The following was the competition schedule for the women's water polo competitions:

DRR	Double round robin

Event	Tue 26	Wed 27	Thu 28	Fri 29	Sat 30	Sun 1
Women	DRR	DRR	DRR	DRR		DRR

== Squads ==
Philippines (PHI)	Singapore (SGP)	Thailand (THA)
Christine Grace Hipol; Haden Skye Alysabeth Bates; Kieran Scout Noelle Bates; Monica Estelle Chernoff; Krystal Rae De la Cruz; Hannah Marie Fonacier; Carla Beatriz Grabador; Jobelyn Ocampo; Nadia Paquin; Gabriella Sicat	Koh Ting Ting; Melissa Chan Pei Tung; Chow Yan Teng; Ong Xuan Rong; Abielle Yeo Zhi Min; Pek Meng Yee; Michelle Tan Ting Yee; Koh Xiao Li; Gina Koh Ting Yi; Ong Cheng Jing; Mounisha Devi Manivannan; Nadyn Kei Thinagaran; Angeline Teo Yi Ling	Varistha Saraikarn; Chayanan Khramyoo; Kaithip Saeteaw; Alwani Sathitanon; Napasan Mouksung; Arisara Minsri; Thitirat Somyos; Issaree Turon; Panchita Rodwattanadisakul; Nirawan Chompoopuen; Janista Thinwilai; Khemasiri Sirivejjabandh; Poonnada Rotchanarut

== Results ==
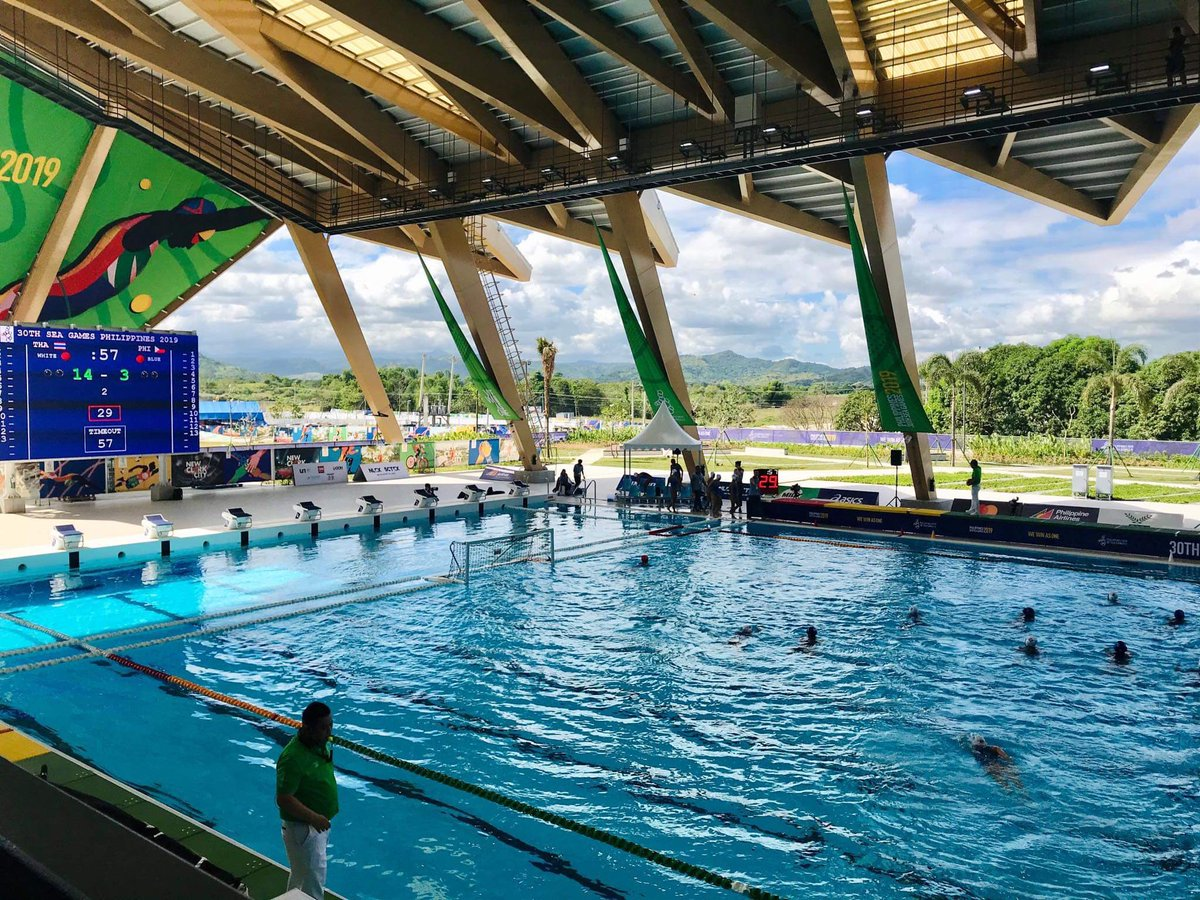
Thailand vs Philippines. November 28, 2019.

All times are Philippine Standard Time (UTC+08:00)

=== Double Round-robin ===
Pos	Team	Pld	W	D	L	GF	GA	GD	Pts	Final Result
1	Thailand	4	4	0	0	90	14	+76	8	Gold medal
2	Singapore	4	2	0	2	38	54	−16	4	Silver medal
3	Philippines (H)	4	0	0	4	22	82	−60	0	Bronze medal

Source: Schedule & Results
(H) Hosts

26 November; 10:00	Report	Singapore	5–19	Thailand	New Clark City Aquatics Center
26 November; 10:00	Report	Score by quarters: 1–6, 1–4, 0–6, 3–3			New Clark City Aquatics Center

27 November; 10:00	Report	Philippines	9–18	Singapore	New Clark City Aquatics Center
27 November; 10:00	Report	Score by quarters: 3–2, 2–6, 1–4, 3–6			New Clark City Aquatics Center

28 November; 10:00	Report	Thailand	32–5	Philippines	New Clark City Aquatics Center
28 November; 10:00	Report	Score by quarters: 7–2, 9–2, 6–1, 10–0			New Clark City Aquatics Center

29 November; 10:00	Report	Thailand	20–2	Singapore	New Clark City Aquatics Center
29 November; 10:00	Report	Score by quarters: 6–1, 5–0, 5–1, 4–0			New Clark City Aquatics Center

1 December; 09:00	Report	Singapore	13–6	Philippines	New Clark City Aquatics Center
1 December; 09:00	Report	Score by quarters: 2–3, 3–1, 3–1, 5–1			New Clark City Aquatics Center

1 December; 14:00	Report	Philippines	2–19	Thailand	New Clark City Aquatics Center
1 December; 14:00	Report	Score by quarters: 1–8, 1–6, 0–5, 0–0			New Clark City Aquatics Center

== See also ==
- Men's tournament
