= Aquatics at the 2009 SEA Games =

The aquatics events at the 2009 Southeast Asian Games included swimming, diving and water polo. The events were held at the Aquatic Center, Swimming Pool, National Sports Complex, Laos.

== Diving ==
The diving events at the 2009 Southeast Asian Games took place at the Swimming Pool, National Sports Complex. The Diving events were held from 11 December to 14 December, with 8 gold medals up for contention.

=== Medal table ===
Rank	Nation	Gold	Silver	Bronze	Total
1	Malaysia	6	1	2	9
2	Indonesia	1	3	1	5
3	Vietnam	1	0	1	2
4	Philippines	0	4	1	5
5	Thailand	0	0	3	3
Totals (5 entries)		8	8	8	24

=== Men's events ===
==== 3 meter springboard ====
December 12

Divers	NOC	Score
Yeoh Ken Nee	(Malaysia)	450.45
Nino Caro	(Philippines)	429.00
Muhammad Fakhrul	(Malaysia)	423.75
Jam Jami Akhmad	(Indonesia)	380.00
Zardo Domenios	(Philippines)	377.00
Anh Duy Vu	(Vietnam)	312.90
Philavanh C	(Laos)	257.85
Satit Tommaoros	(Thailand)	134.50
Somsouk L	(Laos)	325.50

==== 10 meter platform ====
December 11

Divers	NOC	Score
Bryan Nickson Lomas	(Malaysia)	476.15
Muhammad Nasrullah	(Indonesia)	421.65
Ryan Fabriga	(Philippines)	413.95
Jaime Asok	(Philippines)	371.50
Noor Husaini	(Indonesia)	315.05
Abd Rashid	(Malaysia)	308.15
Khaing Maung Kyi	(Myanmar)	248.05
Chantasead N.	(Thailand)	223.50
Satit Tommaoros	(Thailand)	219.70

==== 3 meter synchronized springboard ====
December 13

Divers	NOC	Score
Bryan Nickson Lomas/Yeoh Ken Nee	(Malaysia)	406.32
Nino Carog/Zardo Domenios	(Philippines)	366.96
Noor Husaini/Jam Jami Akhmad	(Indonesia)	336.69
Minh Sang Nguyen/Anh Duy Vu	(Vietnam)	321.75
Satit Tommaoros/Suchart Pichi	(Thailand)	293.25

==== 10 meter synchronised platform ====
December 14

Divers	NOC	Score
Noor Husaini/Muhammad Nasrullah	(Indonesia)	376.74
Jaime Asok/Ryan Fabriga	(Philippines)	374.22
Satit Tommaoros/Suchart Pichi	(Thailand)	275.25
Naung Kya/Nyi Nyi Tun	(Myanmar)	269.19

=== Women's events ===
==== 3 meter springboard ====
December 11

Divers	NOC	Score
Thanh Tra Hoang	(Vietnam)	290.20
Sheila Mae Perez	(Philippines)	286.85
Leong Mun Yee	(Malaysia)	279.30
Sari Ambarwati	(Indonesia)	261.60
Cheong Jun Hoong	(Malaysia)	258.25
Fasavang	(Laos)	163.55

==== 10 meter platform ====
December 12

Divers	NOC	Score
Pandelela Rinong	(Malaysia)	362.95
Traisy Vivien Tukiet	(Malaysia)	334.65
Sukruthai T	(Thailand)	281.90
Della Dinarsari	(Indonesia)	239.85
Sutteenuch P	(Thailand)	239.55

==== 3 meter synchronized springboard ====
December 14

Divers	NOC	Score
Leong Mun Yee/Ng Yan Yee	(Malaysia)	294.72
Maria Natalie Dind/Sari Ambarwati	(Indonesia)	258.45
Le T Thuy Hoang/Thanh Tra Hoang	(Vietnam)	249.90
Sukruthai T./Neeranuch C.	(Thailand)	236.61

==== 10 meter synchronized platform ====
December 13

Divers	NOC	Score
Leong Mun Yee/Pandelela Rinong	(Malaysia)	300.84
Della Dinarsari/Sari Ambarwati	(Indonesia)	252.21
Sukruthai T./Sutteenuch P.	(Thailand)	225.42

== Water polo ==
The Water polo events was held from 5 December to 7 December 2009. Four teams were in competition in a round-robin format, with defending champion Singapore retaining its title which it has won 23 times consecutively since Singapore gained independence in 1965, inclusive of the current games.

=== Medal table ===
Rank	Nation	Gold	Silver	Bronze	Total
1	Singapore	1	0	0	1
2	Philippines	0	1	0	1
3	Indonesia	0	0	1	1
4	Thailand	0	0	0	0
Totals (4 entries)		1	1	1	3

=== Round-robin ===
Standings

Team	Pld	W	D	L	GF	GA	GD	Pts
1 Singapore	3	3	0	0	30	11	19	6
2 Philippines	3	2	0	1	20	20	0	4
3 Indonesia	3	1	0	2	24	35	−11	2
4 Thailand	3	0	0	3	17	25	−8	0

Results

December 5, 2009; 13:00 UTC+7	Game 1	Indonesia	5–14	Singapore	Swimming Pool, National Sports Complex
December 5, 2009; 13:00 UTC+7	Game 1	Score by quarters: 2-5, 1-2, 0-5, 2-2			Swimming Pool, National Sports Complex

December 5, 2009; 14:30 UTC+7	Game 2	Thailand	4–6	Philippines	Swimming Pool, National Sports Complex
December 5, 2009; 14:30 UTC+7	Game 2	Score by quarters: 1-1, 0-0, 0-3, 3-2			Swimming Pool, National Sports Complex

December 6, 2009; 13:00 UTC+7	Game 3	Philippines	1–8	Singapore	Swimming Pool, National Sports Complex
December 6, 2009; 13:00 UTC+7	Game 3	Score by quarters: 1-3, 0-3, 0-1, 0-1			Swimming Pool, National Sports Complex

December 6, 2009; 14:30 UTC+7	Game 4	Indonesia	11–8	Thailand	Swimming Pool, National Sports Complex
December 6, 2009; 14:30 UTC+7	Game 4	Score by quarters: 3-1, 1-2, 4-3, 3-2			Swimming Pool, National Sports Complex

December 7, 2009; 13:00 UTC+7	Game 5	Indonesia	8–13	Philippines	Swimming Pool, National Sports Complex
December 7, 2009; 13:00 UTC+7	Game 5	Score by quarters: 2-2, 1-3, 4-3, 1-5			Swimming Pool, National Sports Complex

December 7, 2009; 14:30 UTC+7	Game 6	Thailand	5–8	Singapore	Swimming Pool, National Sports Complex
December 7, 2009; 14:30 UTC+7	Game 6	Score by quarters: 0-1, 3-1, 0-2, 2-4			Swimming Pool, National Sports Complex

Preceded by 2007	Aquatics at the Southeast Asian Games; 2009 Southeast Asian Games	Succeeded by 2011
