= Water polo at the 2015 SEA Games – Women's tournament =

Women's water polo tournament at the 2015 SEA Games
- Venue: OCBC Aquatic Centre
- Dates: 10–15 June
- Competitors: 65 from 5 nations

Medalists
gold medal	Thailand (THA)
silver medal	Singapore (SIN)
bronze medal	Indonesia (INA)

The women's water polo tournament at the 2015 SEA Games was held at the OCBC Aquatic Centre, Singapore from 10 to 15 June 2015. The competition was held in a round-robin format, where the top 3 teams at the end of the competition will win the gold, silver, and bronze medal respectively.

== Squads ==
Indonesia (INA)	Malaysia (MAS)	Philippines (PHI)
Siti Balkis; Melviani Rayina Eka; Febrika Indirawati; Hudaidah Kadir; Andi Nurul Husnul Khatimah; Glindra Patricia Legawa; Sarah Manzilina; Ayudya Suidarwanty Pratiwi; Febby Familya Putri; Inez Febrianti Rasyid; Aldila Putri Santoso; Ariel Dyah Siwabessy; Annisa Nadhilah Utoro	Yap Yee Chuin; Shirleen Khoo Mei Jee; Cheryl Khoo Minn Jee; Yap Hua Hui; Mak Sin Sin; Woo Yi Wen; Lim Yi Won; Izyan Syaza Abd Halim; Low Jia Yee; Peh Jia Min; Selene Chew Xiang Ling; Trisha Then Chiah Huey; Alicia Chin Tze Ling; Aileen Lim Zhi Xiang	Kunti Dasi Tibby; Lyllian Grace Banzon; Sachi Dasi Tibby; Danyca Kloie Evangelista; Christine Grace Hipol; Daniella Camyl Evangelista; Bea Felise Garrido; Krystal Rae De La Cruz; Lia Trisha Co; Carla Beatriz Grabador; Trixia Paulette Caguitla; Dara Clariza Evangelista; Jobelyn Ocampo
Singapore (SIN)	Thailand (THA)	
Low Seet Teng; Gina Koh Ting Yi; Wu Zhekang; Shauna Christine Sim Hwei Sian; Adelyn Yew Yan Xiang; Angeline Teo Yi Ling; Lim Wen Xin; Lynnette Jane Tan Hui Ying; Ng Yi Wen; Chen Yi Wei Denise; Loke En Yuan; Tan Hui Ning Sheryl; Eunice Karina Fu Yumin	Satakamol Wongpairoj; Paveenuch Phandphoung; Pranisa Nilklad; Wataniya Nilklad; Alwani Sathitanon; Kornkarn Puengpongsakul; Sineenart Sonthipakdee; Varistha Saraikarn; Yuwadee Seenoon; Sarocha Rewrujirek; Varisa Wangvongcharoen; Papimol Munchawanont; Soracha Sangkaman	

== Results ==
All times are Singapore Standard Time (UTC+08:00)

=== Round-robin ===
Pos	Team	Pld	W	D	L	GF	GA	GD	Pts	Final Result
1	Thailand	4	4	0	0	40	16	+24	8	Gold medal
2	Singapore (H)	4	3	0	1	52	14	+38	6	Silver medal
3	Indonesia	4	2	0	2	39	31	+8	4	Bronze medal
4	Malaysia	4	1	0	3	21	49	−28	2	
5	Philippines	4	0	0	4	15	57	−42	0	

Source: Seagames 2015
(H) Hosts

10 June; 13:30	Results	Indonesia	4–7	Singapore	OCBC Aquatic Centre, Singapore; Referees: Sato Kunihiro (JPN), Wang Yaqi (CHN)
10 June; 13:30	Results	Score by quarters: 1–1, 0–2, 0–2, 3–2			OCBC Aquatic Centre, Singapore; Referees: Sato Kunihiro (JPN), Wang Yaqi (CHN)

10 June; 15:00	Results	Philippines	6–7	Malaysia	OCBC Aquatic Centre, Singapore; Referees: Tan Chin Tiong Nicholas (SIN), Gandes Pranolo (INA)
10 June; 15:00	Results	Score by quarters: 2–1, 2–1, 2–2, 0–3			OCBC Aquatic Centre, Singapore; Referees: Tan Chin Tiong Nicholas (SIN), Gandes Pranolo (INA)

12 June; 14:30	Results	Indonesia	6–12	Thailand	OCBC Aquatic Centre, Singapore; Referees: Tan Chin Tiong Nicholas (SIN), Wang Yaqi (CHN)
12 June; 14:30	Results	Score by quarters: 0–2, 0–3, 4–2, 2–5			OCBC Aquatic Centre, Singapore; Referees: Tan Chin Tiong Nicholas (SIN), Wang Yaqi (CHN)

12 June; 16:00	Results	Singapore	21–3	Malaysia	OCBC Aquatic Centre, Singapore; Referees: Gandes Pranolo (INA), Ricardo Dilap Dilap (PHI)
12 June; 16:00	Results	Score by quarters: 5–1, 6–0, 4–1, 6–1			OCBC Aquatic Centre, Singapore; Referees: Gandes Pranolo (INA), Ricardo Dilap Dilap (PHI)

13 June; 14:30	Malaysia	5–13	Thailand	OCBC Aquatic Centre, Singapore; Referees: Sato Kunihiro (JPN), Ricardo Dilap Dilap (PHI)
13 June; 14:30	Score by quarters: 2–4, 2–4, 1–4, 0–1			OCBC Aquatic Centre, Singapore; Referees: Sato Kunihiro (JPN), Ricardo Dilap Dilap (PHI)

13 June; 16:00	Singapore	20–2	Philippines	OCBC Aquatic Centre, Singapore; Referees: Wee Chee Giap (MAS), Gandes Pranolo (INA)
13 June; 16:00	Score by quarters: 10–1, 2–0, 3–0, 5–1			OCBC Aquatic Centre, Singapore; Referees: Wee Chee Giap (MAS), Gandes Pranolo (INA)

14 June; 14:30	Thailand	10–1	Philippines	OCBC Aquatic Centre, Singapore; Referees: Tan Chin Tiong Nicholas (SIN), Gandes Pranolo (INA)
14 June; 14:30	Score by quarters: 1–0, 4–0, 0–1, 5–0			OCBC Aquatic Centre, Singapore; Referees: Tan Chin Tiong Nicholas (SIN), Gandes Pranolo (INA)

14 June; 16:00	Malaysia	6–9	Indonesia	OCBC Aquatic Centre, Singapore; Referees: Jirathorn Wattana Wallop (THA), Wang Yaqi (CHN)
14 June; 16:00	Score by quarters: 2–0, 0–2, 2–5, 2–2			OCBC Aquatic Centre, Singapore; Referees: Jirathorn Wattana Wallop (THA), Wang Yaqi (CHN)

15 June; 14:30	Philippines	6–20	Indonesia	OCBC Aquatic Centre, Singapore; Referees: Tan Chin Tiong Nicholas (SIN), Wang Yaqi (CHN)
15 June; 14:30	Score by quarters: 2–3, 0–7, 3–5, 1–5			OCBC Aquatic Centre, Singapore; Referees: Tan Chin Tiong Nicholas (SIN), Wang Yaqi (CHN)

15 June; 16:00	Thailand	5–4	Singapore	OCBC Aquatic Centre, Singapore
15 June; 16:00	Score by quarters: 2–2, 1–1, 2–1, 0–0			OCBC Aquatic Centre, Singapore

== Final standings ==
Rank	Team	Pld	W	D	L
1st place, gold medalist(s)	Thailand (THA)	4	4	0	0
2nd place, silver medalist(s)	Singapore (SIN)	4	3	0	1
3rd place, bronze medalist(s)	Indonesia (INA)	4	2	0	2
4	Malaysia (MAS)	4	1	0	3
5	Philippines (PHI)	4	0	0	4

== See also ==
- Men's tournament
