= Water polo at the 2010 Asian Games – Women's tournament =

Olympic Tournament

Women at the 2010 Asian Games
- Venue: Tianhe Natatorium
- Date: 15–17 November 2010
- Competitors: 51 from 4 nations

Medalists
gold medal	China
silver medal	Kazakhstan
bronze medal	Uzbekistan

Women's water polo at the 2010 Asian Games was held in Guangzhou, Guangdong, China from November 15 to 17, 2010. In this tournament, 4 teams played.

It also served as the Asian qualification for the 2011 World Aquatics Championships.

== Squads ==
China	India	Kazakhstan	Uzbekistan
Yang Jun; Teng Fei; Liu Ping; Sun Yujun; He Jin; Sun Yating; Song Donglun; Zhang Weiwei; Wang Yi; Ma Huanhuan; Sun Huizi; Zhang Lei; Wang Ying	Siddhi Prabhakar Dahe; Saranya Sasidharan Nair; Biji Varghese; Rema Nithya Madhusoodanan; Sayali Sanjay Gudhekar; Shubhangi Bhoite; Malavika Gubbi; Varshini Gubbi; Shruthi Sridhar; Eekshitha Prasad; Renu Tambat Ramesh; Archa Anil Kumar; Mini Madhavan	Galina Rytova; Natalya Shepelina; Kamila Zakirova; Anna Turova; Liliya Falaleyeva; Anna Zubkova; Zamira Myrzabekova; Yekaterina Gariyeva; Aizhan Akilbayeva; Marina Gritsenko; Yelena Chebotova; Assem Mussarova; Alexandra Turova	Anastasiya Skovpina; Diana Dadabaeva; Aleksandra Sarancha; Eseniya Piftor; Evgeniya Ivanova; Natalya Plyusova; Anna Shcheglova; Ramilya Khalikova; Adelina Zinurova; Olga Mayorova; Anna Plyusova; Elena Dukhanova

== Results ==
All times are China Standard Time (UTC+08:00)

Pos	Team	Pld	W	D	L	GF	GA	GD	Pts
1	China	3	3	0	0	76	8	+68	6
2	Kazakhstan	3	2	0	1	57	20	+37	4
3	Uzbekistan	3	1	0	2	26	41	−15	2
4	India	3	0	0	3	6	96	−90	0

Source: Results

15 November; 14:30	Kazakhstan	38–2	India	Tianhe Natatorium, Guangzhou; Referees: Tan (SIN), Chung (HKG)
15 November; 14:30	Score by quarters: 13–1, 14–0, 8–0, 3–1			Tianhe Natatorium, Guangzhou; Referees: Tan (SIN), Chung (HKG)
15 November; 14:30	Myrzabekova 5	Goals	Varghese, Bhoite 1	Tianhe Natatorium, Guangzhou; Referees: Tan (SIN), Chung (HKG)

15 November; 15:55	China	25–1	Uzbekistan	Tianhe Natatorium, Guangzhou; Referees: Bock (GER), Stavridis (GRE)
15 November; 15:55	Score by quarters: 7–0, 5–0, 5–0, 8–1			Tianhe Natatorium, Guangzhou; Referees: Bock (GER), Stavridis (GRE)
15 November; 15:55	Teng, Sun Yu. 6	Goals	Sarancha 1	Tianhe Natatorium, Guangzhou; Referees: Bock (GER), Stavridis (GRE)

16 November; 14:30	Uzbekistan	5–14	Kazakhstan	Tianhe Natatorium, Guangzhou; Referees: Margeta (SLO), Koganov (AZE)
16 November; 14:30	Score by quarters: 1–4, 1–2, 0–3, 3–5			Tianhe Natatorium, Guangzhou; Referees: Margeta (SLO), Koganov (AZE)
16 November; 14:30	Sarancha 2	Goals	Shepelina, An. Turova, Chebotova 3	Tianhe Natatorium, Guangzhou; Referees: Margeta (SLO), Koganov (AZE)

16 November; 15:55	China	38–2	India	Tianhe Natatorium, Guangzhou; Referees: Makihashi (JPN), Salnichenko (KAZ)
16 November; 15:55	Score by quarters: 10–0, 12–1, 8–1, 8–0			Tianhe Natatorium, Guangzhou; Referees: Makihashi (JPN), Salnichenko (KAZ)
16 November; 15:55	Song 12	Goals	Gudhekar, M. Gubbi 1	Tianhe Natatorium, Guangzhou; Referees: Makihashi (JPN), Salnichenko (KAZ)

17 November; 14:30	Uzbekistan	20–2	India	Tianhe Natatorium, Guangzhou; Referees: Ni (CHN), Shi (CHN)
17 November; 14:30	Score by quarters: 5–1, 5–0, 5–0, 5–1			Tianhe Natatorium, Guangzhou; Referees: Ni (CHN), Shi (CHN)
17 November; 14:30	Sarancha 5	Goals	Bhoite, V. Gubbi 1	Tianhe Natatorium, Guangzhou; Referees: Ni (CHN), Shi (CHN)

17 November; 15:55	China	13–5	Kazakhstan	Tianhe Natatorium, Guangzhou; Referees: Bock (GER), Margeta (SLO)
17 November; 15:55	Score by quarters: 4–1, 3–2, 1–1, 5–1			Tianhe Natatorium, Guangzhou; Referees: Bock (GER), Margeta (SLO)
17 November; 15:55	Teng 3	Goals	Shepelina, Chebotova 2	Tianhe Natatorium, Guangzhou; Referees: Bock (GER), Margeta (SLO)

== Final standing ==
Rank	Team	Pld	W	D	L
1st place, gold medalist(s)	China	3	3	0	0
2nd place, silver medalist(s)	Kazakhstan	3	2	0	1
3rd place, bronze medalist(s)	Uzbekistan	3	1	0	2
4	India	3	0	0	3
