= Uzbekistan women's national water polo team =

Uzbekistan
- FINA code: UZB
- Confederation: AASF (Asia)

Asian Games
- Appearances: 3 (first in 2010)
- Best result: 3rd (2010)
- Last updated: 22 March 2023

The Uzbekistan women's national water polo team represents Uzbekistan in international women's water polo.

The team withdrew from the 2020 Women's Water Polo Olympic Qualification Tournament in Trieste, Italy.

== Results ==
=== World Aquatics Championships ===
| Year | Host country | Rank | M | W | D | L | GF | GA | GD |
|---|---|---|---|---|---|---|---|---|---|
| 2005 | Canada | 15th | 5 | 1 | 0 | 4 | 14 | 56 | -42 |
| 2009 | Italy | 15th | 5 | 1 | 0 | 4 | 34 | 91 | -57 |
| 2011 | China | 16th | 5 | 0 | 0 | 5 | 32 | 88 | -56 |
| 2013 | Spain | 16th | 4 | 0 | 0 | 4 | 15 | 97 | -82 |
| Total | - | 4/16 | 19 | 2 | 0 | 17 | 95 | 332 | -237 |

=== Asian Games ===
| Year | Host country | Rank |
|---|---|---|
| 2010 | China | 3rd |
| 2014 | South Korea | 4th |
| 2022 | China | 5th |

=== Asian Water Polo Championship ===
| Year | Host country | Rank |
|---|---|---|
| 2009 | China | 3rd |
| 2012 | United Arab Emirates | 3rd |
| 2016 | Japan | 4th |
| 2023 | Singapore | 3rd |

=== World Cup ===
2023 FINA Women's Water Polo World Cup 1W,3L / 34,59 -25
