= Water polo at the 2019 SEA Games – Men's tournament =

Men's water polo tournament at the 2019 SEA Games
- Venue: New Clark City Aquatics Center
- Dates: 26 November – 1 December 2019
- Competitors: 64 from 5 nations

Medalists
gold medal	Indonesia (INA)
silver medal	Philippines (PHI)
bronze medal	Singapore (SGP)

The men's water polo tournament at the 2019 SEA Games was held at the New Clark City Aquatics Center, Tarlac, Philippines from 26 November to 1 December 2019. The competition was held in a round-robin format, where the top 3 teams at the end of the competition will win the gold, silver, and bronze medal respectively.

Indonesia won their very first gold medal in the competition by topping the round-robin eliminations, ending the defending champions Singapore's 54-year domination of the sport since 1965.

== Competition schedule ==
The following was the competition schedule for the men's water polo competitions:

RR	Round robin

Event	Tue 26	Wed 27	Thu 28	Fri 29	Sat 30	Sun 1
Men	RR	RR	RR	RR		RR

== Squads ==
Indonesia (INA)	Malaysia (MAS)	Philippines (PHI)	Singapore (SGP)	Thailand (THA)
Rezza Putra; Ridjkie Mulia; Beby Willy Paksi Tarigam; Delvin Felliciano; Silvester Manik; Zaenal Arifin; Yusuf Budiman; Rian Rinaldo; Andi Uwayzulqarni; Fakhri Mahmud; Novian Putra; Made Dwicahya Arsana; Mochammad Alfariz	Tan Yi Xun; Lai Wenheng; Abraham Jesaiah Chin; Joanah Boonchuay; Bryan Wong; Chee Huan Song; Khiew Tze Yean; Lee Xu Yiu; Mohd Irsyad Abd Halim; Toh Yi Hang; Toh Yi Xiang; Kay Chun Hong	Tani Gomez Jr; Abnel Amiladjid; Mico Anota; Romark Johnson Belo; Teodoro Roy Cañete Jr; Adan Gonzales; Macgyver Reyes; Reynaldo Salonga Jr; Juan Paolo Serrano; Vincent Sicat; Mark Jerwin Valdez; Matthew Royce Yu; Mummar Alamara	Koh Jian Ying; Goh Wen Zhe; Ang An Jun; Darren Lee Jit-An; Lee Chang-Kang; Lee Kai Yang; Tang Yee Heng; Chow Jing Lun; Ooi Yee Jia; Nathanael Wayne Chong; Jayden See Tein Ee; Yu Junjie; Chiam Kunyang	Jakkrit Nakniyom; Thornthn Niyormpatama; Watcharawong Ekchaona; Jiramate Paedpheenong; Pattanit Chompoosang; Chanoknan Kaewmanee; Nopavich Savetmalanond; Krisakorn Boondech; Phongsathon Chainiyom; Phatsakorn Maneejohn; Suteenan Kaewmanee; Kreerati Pimpapak; Pokpong Morksang

== Results ==
All times are Philippine Standard Time (UTC+08:00)

=== Round-robin ===
Pos	Team	Pld	W	D	L	GF	GA	GD	Pts	Final Result
1	Indonesia	4	3	1	0	44	30	+14	7	Gold medal
2	Philippines (H)	4	2	2	0	36	27	+9	6	Silver medal
3	Singapore	4	2	1	1	42	25	+17	5	Bronze medal
4	Thailand	4	1	0	3	42	43	−1	2	
5	Malaysia	4	0	0	4	28	67	−39	0	

Source: WATERPOLO MEN - GROUP B
(H) Hosts

26 November; 17:00	Report	Malaysia	5–19	Thailand	New Clark City Aquatics Center
26 November; 17:00	Report	Score by quarters: 0–6, 4–4, 0–5, 1–4			New Clark City Aquatics Center

26 November; 19:00	Report	Philippines	6–6	Indonesia	New Clark City Aquatics Center
26 November; 19:00	Report	Score by quarters: 1–1, 2–3, 2–1, 1–1			New Clark City Aquatics Center

27 November; 17:00	Report	Thailand	12–17	Indonesia	New Clark City Aquatics Center
27 November; 17:00	Report	Score by quarters: 1–7, 2–3, 5–3, 4–4			New Clark City Aquatics Center

27 November; 19:00	Report	Malaysia	5–17	Singapore	New Clark City Aquatics Center
27 November; 19:00	Report	Score by quarters: 0–3, 2–5, 2–5, 1–4			New Clark City Aquatics Center

28 November; 17:00	Report	Indonesia	7–5	Singapore	New Clark City Aquatics Center
28 November; 17:00	Report	Score by quarters: 1–1, 4–1, 1–1, 1–2			New Clark City Aquatics Center

28 November; 19:00	Report	Thailand	4–7	Philippines	New Clark City Aquatics Center
28 November; 19:00	Report	Score by quarters: 1–1, 1–3, 1–2, 1–1			New Clark City Aquatics Center

29 November; 17:00	Report	Indonesia	14–7	Malaysia	New Clark City Aquatics Center
29 November; 17:00	Report	Score by quarters: 4–0, 3–2, 2–3, 5–2			New Clark City Aquatics Center

29 November; 19:00	Report	Singapore	6–6	Philippines	New Clark City Aquatics Center
29 November; 19:00	Report	Score by quarters: 0–1, 2–3, 2–1, 2–1			New Clark City Aquatics Center

1 December; 17:00	Report	Singapore	14–7	Thailand	New Clark City Aquatics Center
1 December; 17:00	Report	Score by quarters: 3–1, 2–3, 7–0, 2–3			New Clark City Aquatics Center

1 December; 19:00	Report	Philippines	14–11	Malaysia	New Clark City Aquatics Center
1 December; 19:00	Report	Score by quarters: 2–2, 2–1, 6–3, 4–5			New Clark City Aquatics Center

== See also ==
- Women's tournament
