= Water polo at the 2017 SEA Games – Men's tournament =

Men's water polo tournament at the 2017 SEA Games
- Venue: National Aquatic Centre
- Dates: 15 – 20 August
- Competitors: 65 from 5 nations

Medalists
gold medal	Singapore (SGP)
silver medal	Indonesia (INA)
bronze medal	Malaysia (MAS)

The men's water polo tournament at the 2017 SEA Games was held at the National Aquatic Centre, Bukit Jalil, Kuala Lumpur from 15 to 20 August 2017. The competition was a round-robin format, where the top 3 teams at the end of the competition win the gold, silver, and bronze medal respectively.

== Competition schedule ==
The following was the competition schedule for the men's water polo competitions:

RR	Round robin

Tue 15	Wed 16	Thu 17	Fri 18	Sat 19	Sun 20
RR	RR	RR	RR		RR

== Squads ==
Indonesia (INA)	Malaysia (MAS)	Philippines (PHI)	Singapore (SGP)	Thailand (THA)
Muhammad Zaki; Beby Willy Eka; Muhammad Hamid Firdaus; Silvester Golberg Manik; Maulana Bayu Herfianto; Benny Respati; Yusuf Budiman; Rezza Auditya Putra; Delvin Felliciano; Ridjkie Mulia; Rian Rinaldo; Zaenal Arifin; Novian Dwi Putra	Chai Jie Lun; Tan Yi Xun; Chiew Chern Kwang; Toh Yi Xiang; Tan Tsien Hann; Toh Yi Hang; Mohd Irshad Syahir Abd Halim; Anderson Wong Yong Hui; Soh Yong Wee; Daryl Khoo Tiong Jinn; Leung Chee Liang; Fam Jia Yi; Hor Jia Yang	Tani Gomez Jr.; Matthew Royce Yu; Macgyver Reyes; Mark Jerwin Valdez; Mico Anota; Romark Johnson Belo; Reynaldo Salonga Jr.; Teodoro Roy Canete Jr.; Mummar Alamara; Frazier Alamara; Dave Avangelista; Juan Paolo Serrano; Abnel Amiladjid	Ang Wei Ming Sean; Ang An Jun; Chow Jing Lun; Darren Lee Jit An; Koh Jian Ying; Chiam Kun Yang; Lee Kai Yang; Loh Zhi Zhi; Ooi Yee Jia; Samuel Moses Yu Nan-Feng; Ong Wei Loong Bryan; Yip Yang; Yu Junjie	Jakkrit Nakniyom; Pattanit Chompoosang; Supakorn Klinhom; Pinit Chaisombat; Setthaphong Siripromma; Nopavich Savetmalanond; Meathus Chetamee; Pruetthikorn Khunprathum; Krittapas Sangthanapanich; Kirasit Patarathitinant; Sornthum Wongpairoj; Aussawin Wajangam; Wanjak Suwanchart

== Results ==
All times are Malaysia Standard Time (UTC+08:00)

=== Round-robin ===
Pos	Team	Pld	W	D	L	GF	GA	GD	Pts	Final Result
1	Singapore	4	3	1	0	41	15	+26	7	Gold medal
2	Indonesia	4	3	1	0	29	15	+14	7	Silver medal
3	Malaysia (H)	4	2	0	2	26	35	−9	4	Bronze medal
4	Philippines	4	1	0	3	26	34	−8	2	
5	Thailand	4	0	0	4	19	42	−23	0	

Updated to match(es) played on 20 August 2017. Source:
(H) Hosts

15 August; 09:00	Indonesia	4–3	Malaysia	National Aquatic Centre, Bukit Jalil
15 August; 09:00	Score by quarters: 1–1, 1–1, 2–1, 0–0			National Aquatic Centre, Bukit Jalil

15 August; 11:00	Philippines	9–7	Thailand	National Aquatic Centre, Bukit Jalil
15 August; 11:00	Score by quarters: 2–0, 2–1, 3–2, 2–4			National Aquatic Centre, Bukit Jalil

16 August; 09:00	Malaysia	8–7	Philippines	National Aquatic Centre, Bukit Jalil
16 August; 09:00	Score by quarters: 1–1, 3–0, 2–4, 2–2			National Aquatic Centre, Bukit Jalil

16 August; 11:00	Thailand	2–13	Singapore	National Aquatic Centre, Bukit Jalil
16 August; 11:00	Score by quarters: 0–4, 0–1, 1–4, 1–4			National Aquatic Centre, Bukit Jalil

17 August; 09:00	Thailand	3–9	Indonesia	National Aquatic Centre, Bukit Jalil
17 August; 09:00	Score by quarters: 2–0, 0–1, 0–5, 1–3			National Aquatic Centre, Bukit Jalil

17 August; 11:00	Philippines	5–7	Singapore	National Aquatic Centre, Bukit Jalil
17 August; 11:00	Score by quarters: 2–1, 1–4, 1–1, 1–1			National Aquatic Centre, Bukit Jalil

18 August; 09:00	Singapore	4–4	Indonesia	National Aquatic Centre, Bukit Jalil
18 August; 09:00	Score by quarters: 2–0, 1–1, 0–3, 1–0			National Aquatic Centre, Bukit Jalil

18 August; 11:00	Malaysia	11–7	Thailand	National Aquatic Centre, Bukit Jalil
18 August; 11:00	Score by quarters: 4–4, 3–1, 3–1, 1–1			National Aquatic Centre, Bukit Jalil

20 August; 09:00	Indonesia	12–5	Philippines	National Aquatic Centre, Bukit Jalil
20 August; 09:00	Score by quarters: 4–1, 2–0, 3–2, 3–2			National Aquatic Centre, Bukit Jalil

20 August; 11:00	Singapore	17–4	Malaysia	National Aquatic Centre, Bukit Jalil
20 August; 11:00	Score by quarters: 2–0, 4–1, 7–0, 4–3			National Aquatic Centre, Bukit Jalil

== Final standings ==
Rank	Team	Pld	W	D	L
1st place, gold medalist(s)	Singapore	4	3	1	0
2nd place, silver medalist(s)	Indonesia	4	3	1	0
3rd place, bronze medalist(s)	Malaysia	4	2	0	2
4	Philippines	4	1	0	3
5	Thailand	4	0	0	4

== See also ==
- Women's tournament
