= Susan Papa =

Filipino swimmer (1955–2019)

Personal information
- National team: Philippines
- Born: 1954/1955
- Died: May 19, 2019 (aged 64)

Sport
- Sport: Swimming
Medal record
Women's swimming
Representing Philippines
Asian Games
Bronze medal – third place	1974 Tehran	4 x 100 m medley relay

Susan Papa (1954/1955–May 19, 2019) was a Filipino swimmer and later sports executive.

== Swimming career ==
Papa was a national swimmer who competed for the Philippines in international swimming competitions including the 1974 Asian Games where she won the bronze medal in the women's 4x100 medley relay with three other swimmers. She started competing internationally at age 11.

Papa retired from competitive swimming in 1976

== Sports administration ==
After retirement Papa, founded and became a sports administrator of the Philippine Swimming League, a sports organization for swimmers and coaches which is a member of the Federation of School Sports Association of the Philippines (FESSAP), and affiliated with the International University Sports Federation (FISU).

Papa was a vocal critic of the Philippine Swimming, Inc. under Mark Joseph whose administration barred swimmers affiliated with Papa's organization from competing in events sanctioned by FINA such as the Southeast Asian Games, Asian Games, and the Olympics who insisted that only direct members of the national sports association be allowed to represent the Philippines in international competitions. Papa has expressed that many swimmers cannot afford membership fees imposed by PSI.

In May 2018, the PSL began its unification talks with the rival group, the FINA, POC and POC-recognized Philippine Swimming Inc. under the leadership of Olympic Swimmer Gerardo “Ral” Rosario, who claimed to be the President of the organization and now under a new head Ms. Lailani Velasco.

== Death ==
Papa died on May 19, 2019, at age 64 due to complications from cervical cancer after months of treatment. Alexandre Papa took over from Susan Papa as President of the PSL.

== Personal life ==
Susan is the sister of basketball player Jun Papa.
