= Thailand women's national water polo team =

Thailand
- FINA code: THA
- Confederation: AASF (Asia)

World Championship
- Appearances: 1 (first in 2022)
- Best result: 15th (2022)

Asian Games
- Appearances: 3 (first in 2018)
- Best result: 3rd (2026)
- Last updated: 12 November 2022

The Thailand women's national water polo team represents Thailand in international women's water polo. The team won the gold medal at the Southeast Asian Games in 2015, 2017, 2019 and 2023. The team competed in their first World Championship in 2022 where they finished bottom of their group. The team made their debut at the Asian Games in 2018.

== Results ==
=== World Aquatics Championships ===
Year	Host country	Rank
2022	Hungary	15th

=== Asian Games ===
Year	Host country	Rank
2018	Indonesia	4th
2022	China	5th
2026	Japan	3rd

=== Southeast Asian Games ===
Year	Host country	Rank
2015	Singapore	1st
2017	Malaysia	1st
2019	Philippines	1st
2023	Cambodia	1st
2025	Thailand	1st

=== Asian Water Polo Championship ===
Year	Host country	Rank
2022	Thailand	4th
2023	Singapore	2nd
