= Water polo at the 2015 SEA Games – Men's tournament =

Men's water polo tournament at the 2015 SEA Games
- Venue: OCBC Aquatic Centre
- Dates: 11–16 June
- Competitors: 65 from 5 nations

Medalists
| gold medal | Singapore (SIN) |
| silver medal | Indonesia (INA) |
| bronze medal | Thailand (THA) |

The men's water polo tournament at the 2015 SEA Games was held at the OCBC Aquatic Centre, Singapore from 11 to 16 June 2015. The competition was held in a round-robin format, where the top 3 teams at the end of the competition will win the gold, silver, and bronze medal respectively.

== Squads ==
| Indonesia (INA) | Malaysia (MAS) | Philippines (PHI) |
|---|---|---|
| Zuliansyah; Beby Willy Eka Paksi Tarigan; Muhammad Rizki; Delvin Feliciano; Andi Muhammad Uwayzulqarni; Benny Respati; Yusuf Budiman; Rezza Auditya Putra; Brandley Ignatius Legawa; Ridjkie Mulia; Muhamad Hamid Firdaus; Zaenal Arifin; Novian Dwi Putra | Leslie Low Yow Chung; Tan Yi Xun; Chiew Chern Kwang; Anderson Wong Yong Hui; Tan Tsien Hann; Sung Jun Hao; Chow Choon Yung; Alex Tan Ming Han; Soh Yong Wee; Chow Tie Cheng; Sharvin N Vivekanandan; Fam Jia Yi; Chee Huan Song | Tani Gomez Jr.; Matthew Royce Yu; Macgyver Reyes; Mark Jerwin Valdez; Mico Anota; Wilfredo Sunglao Jr.; Reynaldo Salonga Jr.; Romark Johnson Belo; Norton Alamara; Adan Gonzales; Mummar Alamara; Juan Paolo Serrano; Abnel Amiladjid |
| Singapore (SIN) | Thailand (THA) | |
| Tay Sin Chao Nigel; Lin Diyang; Loh Zhi Zhi; Teo Zhen Wei Eugene; Ong Wei Loong Bryan; Paul Louis Tan Jwee Ann; Chiam Kunyang; Ang An Jun; Goh Cheng Wei Marcus; Ang Wei Ming Sean; Yip Yang; Koh Jian Ying; Lee Kai Yang | Naruedon Niwasakul; Pattanit Chompoosang; Pitipong Ruchisereekul; Pinit Chaisombat; Patipol Phandphoung; Julanut Jintanugool; Meathus Chetamee; Terdtong Klinubol; Ronnakrit Jarananon; Pruetthikorn Khunprathum; Sornthum Wongpairoj; Ekkaphan Jaengprajak; Wanjak Suwanchart | |

== Results ==
All times are Singapore Standard Time (UTC+08:00)

=== Round-robin ===
| Pos | Team | Pld | W | D | L | GF | GA | GD | Pts | Final Result |
|---|---|---|---|---|---|---|---|---|---|---|
| 1 | Singapore (H) | 4 | 4 | 0 | 0 | 74 | 18 | +56 | 8 | Gold medal |
| 2 | Indonesia | 4 | 3 | 0 | 1 | 56 | 35 | +21 | 6 | Silver medal |
| 3 | Thailand | 4 | 2 | 0 | 2 | 34 | 41 | −7 | 4 | Bronze medal |
| 4 | Malaysia | 4 | 1 | 0 | 3 | 24 | 47 | −23 | 2 | |
| 5 | Philippines | 4 | 0 | 0 | 4 | 18 | 65 | −47 | 0 | |

Source: Seagames 2015
(H) Hosts

| 11 June; 13:30 | Results | Singapore | 19–4 | Malaysia | OCBC Aquatic Centre, Singapore; Referees: Ricardo Dilap Dilap (PHI), Wang Yaqi (CHN) |
| 11 June; 13:30 | Results | Score by quarters: 6–0, 1–1, 5–1, 7–2 | | | OCBC Aquatic Centre, Singapore; Referees: Ricardo Dilap Dilap (PHI), Wang Yaqi (CHN) |

| 11 June; 15:00 | Results | Indonesia | 22–6 | Philippines | OCBC Aquatic Centre, Singapore; Referees: Jirathorn Wattana Wallop (THA), Sato Kunihiro (JPN) |
| 11 June; 15:00 | Results | Score by quarters: 6–3, 6–1, 6–0, 4–2 | | | OCBC Aquatic Centre, Singapore; Referees: Jirathorn Wattana Wallop (THA), Sato Kunihiro (JPN) |

| 12 June; 18:30 | Results | Malaysia | 10–4 | Philippines | OCBC Aquatic Centre, Singapore; Referees: Jirathorn Wattana Wallop (THA), Tan Chin Tiong Nicholas (SIN) |
| 12 June; 18:30 | Results | Score by quarters: 2–0, 2–2, 5–2, 1–0 | | | OCBC Aquatic Centre, Singapore; Referees: Jirathorn Wattana Wallop (THA), Tan Chin Tiong Nicholas (SIN) |

| 12 June; 20:00 | Singapore | 17–2 | Thailand | OCBC Aquatic Centre, Singapore; Referees: Sato Kunihiro (JPN), Wang Yaqi (CHN) |
| 12 June; 20:00 | Score by quarters: 4–0, 6–0, 5–1, 2–1 | | | OCBC Aquatic Centre, Singapore; Referees: Sato Kunihiro (JPN), Wang Yaqi (CHN) |

| 13 June; 18:30 | Philippines | 6–10 | Thailand | OCBC Aquatic Centre, Singapore; Referees: Wang Yaqi (CHN), Tan Chin Tiong Nicholas (SIN) |
| 13 June; 18:30 | Score by quarters: 1–4, 2–3, 3–1, 0–2 | | | OCBC Aquatic Centre, Singapore; Referees: Wang Yaqi (CHN), Tan Chin Tiong Nicholas (SIN) |

| 13 June; 20:00 | Malaysia | 5–11 | Indonesia | OCBC Aquatic Centre, Singapore; Referees: Sato Kunihiro (JPN), Jirathorn Wattana Wallop (THA) |
| 13 June; 20:00 | Score by quarters: 1–3, 0–4, 1–2, 3–2 | | | OCBC Aquatic Centre, Singapore; Referees: Sato Kunihiro (JPN), Jirathorn Wattana Wallop (THA) |

| 14 June; 18:30 | Thailand | 9–13 | Indonesia | OCBC Aquatic Centre, Singapore; Referees: Sato Kunihiro (JPN), Wang Yaqi (CHN) |
| 14 June; 18:30 | Score by quarters: 2–1, 1–4, 4–4, 2–4 | | | OCBC Aquatic Centre, Singapore; Referees: Sato Kunihiro (JPN), Wang Yaqi (CHN) |

| 14 June; 20:00 | Philippines | 2–23 | Singapore | OCBC Aquatic Centre, Singapore; Referees: Gandes Pranolo (INA), Sato Kunihiro (JPN) |
| 14 June; 20:00 | Score by quarters: 0–7, 1–4, 1–6, 0–6 | | | OCBC Aquatic Centre, Singapore; Referees: Gandes Pranolo (INA), Sato Kunihiro (JPN) |

| 15 June; 18:30 | Thailand | 13–5 | Malaysia | OCBC Aquatic Centre, Singapore; Referees: Gandes Pranolo (INA), Ricardo Dilap Dilap (PHI) |
| 15 June; 18:30 | Score by quarters: 2–1, 3–0, 2–1, 6–3 | | | OCBC Aquatic Centre, Singapore; Referees: Gandes Pranolo (INA), Ricardo Dilap Dilap (PHI) |

| 16 June; 13:30 | Indonesia | 10–15 | Singapore | OCBC Aquatic Centre, Singapore; Referees: Sato Kunihiro (JPN); Wang Yaqi (CHN) |
| 16 June; 13:30 | Score by quarters: 1–3, 5–4, 4–5, 0–3 | | | OCBC Aquatic Centre, Singapore; Referees: Sato Kunihiro (JPN); Wang Yaqi (CHN) |

== Final standings ==
| Rank | Team | Pld | W | D | L |
|---|---|---|---|---|---|
| 1st place, gold medalist(s) | Singapore (SIN) | 4 | 4 | 0 | 0 |
| 2nd place, silver medalist(s) | Indonesia (INA) | 4 | 3 | 0 | 1 |
| 3rd place, bronze medalist(s) | Thailand (THA) | 4 | 2 | 0 | 2 |
| 4 | Malaysia (MAS) | 4 | 1 | 0 | 3 |
| 5 | Philippines (PHI) | 4 | 0 | 0 | 4 |

== See also ==
- Women's tournament
