= Singapore women's national water polo team =

Singapore
- FINA code: SGP
- Confederation: AASF (Asia)
- Head coach: Yu Lei
- Asst coach: Melissa Chan; Lynnette Tan
- Captain: Abielle Yeo

World Championship
- Appearances: 2 (first in 2024)
- Best result: 16th place (2024, 2025)

The Singapore women's national water polo team represents Singapore in international women's water polo. The team won the gold medal at the 2011 Southeast Asian Games in Indonesia and the silver medal in 2015, 2017 and 2019.

== Results ==
=== World Championships ===
Year	Host country	Rank
2024	Qatar	16th
2025	Singapore	16th

=== Asian Games ===
Year	Host country	Rank
2014	South Korea	5th
2022	China	4th
2026	Japan	

=== Southeast Asian Games ===
Year	Host country	Rank
2011	Indonesia	1st
2015	Singapore	2nd
2017	Malaysia	2nd
2019	Philippines	2nd
2023	Cambodia	2nd
2025	Thailand	2nd

=== Asian Water Polo Championship ===
Year	Host country	Rank
2022	Thailand	5th
2023	Singapore	4th
2025	China	4th
2025	India	5th

== Current squad ==
Roster for the 2025 World Championships.

Head coach: Yu Lei

- 1 Rochelle Ong GK
- 2 Charlene Tio FP
- 3 Loh Yu Xuan FP
- 4 Yap Jingxuan FP
- 5 Koh Ting Ting FP
- 6 Nicole Lim FP
- 7 Abielle Yeo FP
- 8 Heather Lee FP
- 9 Kayla Yeo FP
- 10 Ong Cheng Jing FP
- 11 Wan Celeste FP
- 12 Ariel Charis Lim FP
- 13 Mounisha Devi GK
- 14 Koh Xiao Li FP
