= Philippines men's national water polo team =

Philippines
- FINA code: PHI
- Association: Philippine Swimming, Inc.
- Confederation: AASF (Asia)
- Head coach: Reynaldo Galang
- Asst coach: Ricardo Dilapdilap; Dale Evangelista
- Captain: Tani Gomez Jr.
- Home venue: Rizal Memorial Sports Complex

Asian Games
- Appearances: 3 (first in 1954)
- Best result: 5th place (1958)

Southeast Asian Games
- Appearances: 7 (first in 2005)
- Best result: (silver) (2005, 2007, 2009, 2011, 2019)

The Philippines men's national water polo team represents the Philippines in international men's water polo competitions and friendly matches. It is currently under the management of Philippine Swimming, Inc. (PSI).

== Results ==
=== Major tournaments ===
==== Competitive record ====
Tournament	Appearances	Finishes				
Tournament	Appearances	Champions	Runners-up	Third place	Fourth place	Total
FINA Challengers' Cup	2	0	0	0	1	1
Asian Games	3	0	0	0	0	0
Asian Cup	1	0	0	0	0	0
Southeast Asian Games	7	0	5	0	1	6
Total	13	0	5	0	2	7

==== FINA Challengers' Cup ====
- 2009 - 4th place
- 2019 - 5th place

==== Asian Games ====
- 1954 - 6th place
- 1958 - 5th place
- 2006 - 6th place

==== Asian Swimming Championships ====
- 2014 - Withdrew

==== Asian Cup ====
- 2013 - 5th place

==== Southeast Asian Games ====
- 2005 - (silver) Silver medal
- 2007 - (silver) Silver medal
- 2009 - (silver) Silver medal
- 2011 - (silver) Silver medal
- 2013 - Did not participate
- 2015 - 5th place
- 2017 - 4th place
- 2019 - (silver) Silver medal

=== Minor tournaments ===
==== Arafura Sports Festival ====
- 1993 - (silver) Silver medal
- 1999 - (bronze) Bronze medal

== Team ==
=== Current squad (2023) ===
- Mummar Alamara
- Abnel Amiladjid
- Mico Anota
- Romark Johnson Belo
- Teodoro Roy Cañete Jr.
- Tani Gomez Jr.
- Adan Gonzales
- Macgyver Reyes
- Reynaldo Salonga Jr.
- Juan Paolo Serrano
- Mark Jerwin Valdez
- Matthew Royce Yu
- Jose Gabriel Laviña

== External Site ==
- Official Facebook page
