= Philippine Swimming League =

Sports league based in the Philippines

The Philippine Swimming League (PSL) is an organization for the sport of swimming based in the Philippines. It organizes swimming tournaments usually conducted by month. Its founder is Olympian and former Philippine national swimmer and sports journalist Susan Papa.

The Philippine Swimming League has a group of swimmers under the leadership of Joan Mojdeh whom Susan Papa entrusted the future management and operation of the organization. Recently however, Susan Papa's older brother Alexandre Papa, a retired US pensioner claimed the position left by his sister and took over as President of the Philippine Swimming League with the support of the only remaining PSL member of the Board of Incorporators, Quezon City, Philippines Fiscal Maria Theresa Arao Mahiwo.

In May 2018, the PSL began its unification talks with the rival group, the FINA, POC and POC-recognized Philippine Swimming, Inc. under the leadership of Olympic swimmer Gerardo "Ral" Rosario, who claimed to be the president of the organization. and now under a new head Ms. Lailani Velasco.
