= Philippine Aquatics =

National governing body of aquatic sports in the Philippines

Philippine Aquatics Inc.
- Sport: Aquatics
- Jurisdiction: National
- Founded: 2023
- Affiliation: World Aquatics
- President: Michael Vargas
- Secretary: Eric Buhain
- Replaced: Philippine Swimming Inc.

Official website
- www.philippineaquatics.com
- (Philippines)

Philippine Aquatics Incorporated is the national governing body of aquatic sports in the Philippines. It oversees swimming, diving, and water polo. The organization is accredited by the Philippine Olympic Committee (POC) since October 2023.

Previously Philippine Swimming Inc. (PSI) was the national governing body. PSI was formerly accredited by World Aquatics until December 22, 2022, when the international swimming body revoked its recognition.

== History ==
=== As Philippine Swimming Inc. ===
Philippine Swimming Incorporated (PSI) was formerly known as the Philippine Amateur Swimming Association (PASA).

Around the early 2000s, PASA was led by president Monchito Ilagan who was elected in 2002. In 2004, a leadership crisis arose after Mark Joseph claimed the presidency in an election.

==== Joseph era ====
The Philippine Olympic Committee affirmed the installation of Joseph as PASA president in 2005 as a result of an alleged agreement between him and Ilagan. This includes the holding of an election within 90 days. Election was claimed to have occurred in 2005 or 2006.

PASA achieved feats under Joseph, qualifying five swimmers for the 2008 Summer Olympics. In the 2007 Southeast Asian Games the country won eight gold medals. However Joseph's administration also had further controversies. The federation often came into conflict with the Philippine Swimming League (PSL) of Nikki Coseteng and Susan Papa and Joseph faced graft allegations involving the disbursement of government funds.

Joseph would head abroad over health concerns, with his secretary general Lani Velasco taking over as Officer in Charge. She would get elected as president after an election sanctioned by the Philippine Olympic Committee in February 2018.

==== Velasco era ====
Under Velasco, swimmers from rival group PSL, were able to take part in the PSI sanctioned 2019 PSI Grand Prix. The Philippines would end its gold medal drought at the Southeast Asian Games since 2009, with a medal by James Deiparine in the 2019 edition hosted at home. Velasco would win a new four-year term in April 2022.

==== Revocation of PSI's recognition ====
On December 3, 2022, the FINA revoked its recognition of the membership board of the PSI, and instituted a stabilization committee in its place after accruing several complaints over its governance. On December 15, FINA, now known as World Aquatics, withdrew recognition of the PSI itself. The stabilization committee is set to recommend a new federation to replace the PSI.

===== Transition team =====
On June 8, 2023, a new set of officials were elected for the PSI, with Michael Vargas as transitional president. The original officials would protest against the election which they view as a violation of the organization's amended by-laws. World Aquatics would recognize the results of the election.

=== Formation of Philippine Aquatics ===
Philippine Aquatics was formed PSI's place which was recognized as a member of the Philippine Olympic Committee in October 2023.

== Presidents ==
Presidents of PSI

- Monchito Ilagan (2002–2005 (Note: Disputed from 2004; Mark Joseph recognized as Ilagan's successor in 2005))
- Mark Joseph (2005–2018)
- Lani Velasco (2018–2023)
- Michael Vargas (2023)

Presidents of Philippine Aquatics

- Michael Vargas (2023–)

== See also ==
- List of Philippine records in swimming
- List of Olympic medalists for the Philippines
- Philippines men's national water polo team
- Philippines women's national water polo team
