= Jessie Lacuna =

Filipino swimmer (born 1993)

Jessie Lacuna OLY
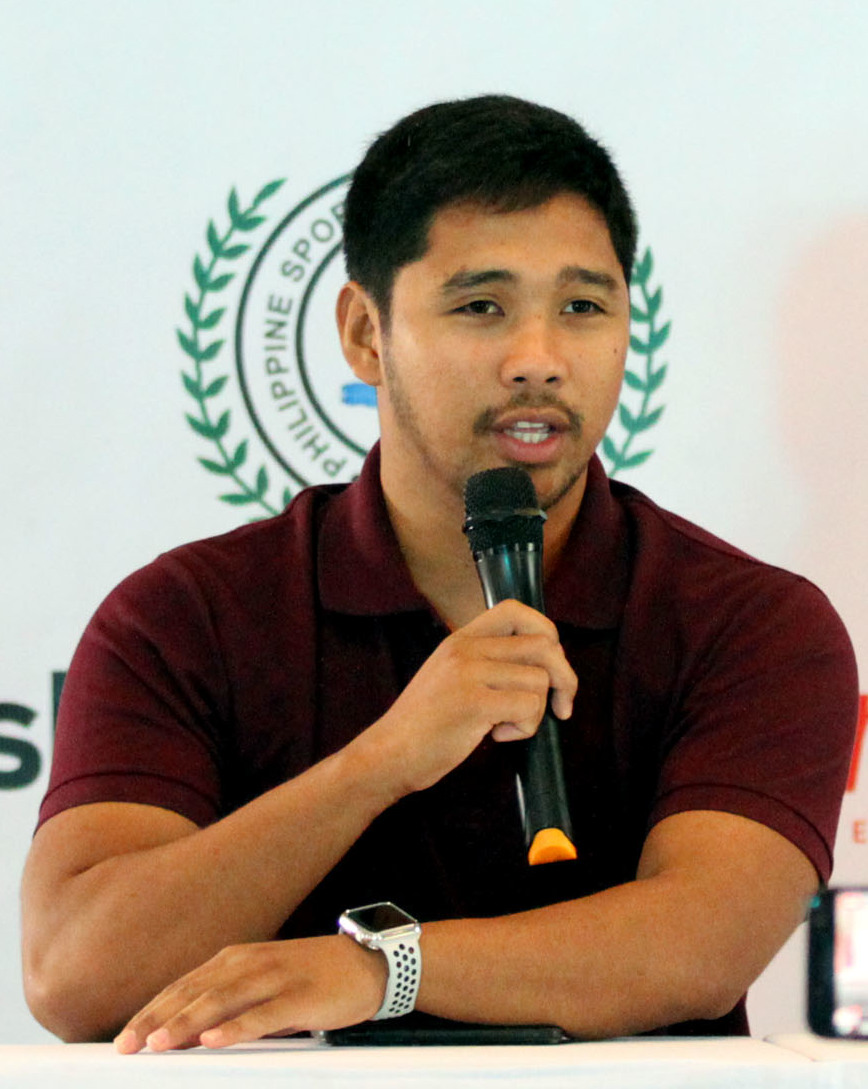
- Lacuna in 2020

Personal information
- Full name: Jessie Khing de Guzman Lacuna
- Nationality: (Philippines) Filipino
- Born: December 23, 1993 (age 32) Pulilan, Bulacan, Philippines
- Height: 5 ft 7 in (170 cm) (2012)
- Weight: 65 kg (143 lb) (2012)

Sport
- Sport: Swimming
- Strokes: Backstroke, butterfly, freestyle
- Club: Bulacan Bullsharks Swimming Club, Philippine Aquatic Sports Association Inc.
- College team: FAST Ateneo Varsity Swimming Team
- Coach: Carlos Brosas
Medal record
Men's swimming
Representing Philippines
Event	1st	2nd	3rd
Southeast Asian Games	0	3	4
Total	0	3	4
Southeast Asian Games
Silver medal – second place	2009 Vientiane	4 × 200 m freestyle
Silver medal – second place	2011 Jakarta	200 m freestyle
Silver medal – second place	2015 Singapore	400 m freestyle
Bronze medal – third place	2011 Jakarta	4 × 100 m freestyle
Bronze medal – third place	2011 Jakarta	4 × 200 m freestyle
Bronze medal – third place	2015 Singapore	200 m butterfly
Bronze medal – third place	2015 Singapore	200 m medley

Jessie Khing de Guzman Lacuna (/ləˈkjuːnə/ lə-KEW-nə; born December 23, 1993) is a Filipino former competitive swimmer who competed in the freestyle and butterfly events. He had, overall, won 26 Gold medals in Philippine Olympic Games and 7 in SEA Age Group Swimming Championship, he represented the country Philippines in Southeast Asian Games and Asian Games.

Lacuna had a total of 51 gold medals, consisting of 35 at national and 16 at international titles. He also qualified as universality in FINA in 200 meters Freestyle at the 1st SEA Swim Championships. He had timed at 1:53.84 in which he ranked first as of in the Philippines' federation.

== Early life ==
Lacuna was born and raised in Barangay Paltao, Pulilan, Bulacan. His potential in swimming was discovered when he was a child, through the neighboring resort where he often swims with his parents since he was months old. His parents made him wear inflatable armband that helps him paddle on water. This soon became his pastime. At the age of 6, he already started joining swimming competitions at school.

In 2001, Lacuna had his first national competition at the age of 8 that, winning a gold medal in the 100 meter freestyle event. His first win at a national event took him into various other national competitions, including the Philippine Olympic Festival. Bulacan BullSharks Swimming Club was Lacuna's first swimming club where he competed as a high school student at Bulacan State University Laboratory High School, division in 2005.

Until turning college, the Philippine Olympic Committee recognizes Lacuna's overall 32 gold medals in the Philippine Olympic Games and other local swimming competitions. He joined the national club in the Philippines which molds athletes into international prospects. This then leads him to entering the Asian Games.

== Career ==
Medal record

Batang Pinoy

Boys' Swimming
Gold medal – first place	100 m Butterfly	1:02.71 (2001)
Silver medal – second place	200 m Freestyle	2:05.35 (2001)
Silver medal – second place	200 m Freestyle	(UNK) (2002)
Silver medal – second place	100 m Freestyle	(UNK) (2003)
Bronze medal – third place	200 m Butterfly	(UNK) (2003)

Philippine Olympic Festival

Boys' Swimming
Gold medal – first place	400 Individual Medley	(UNK) (2007)
Gold medal – first place	400 m Freestyle	(UNK) (2007)
Silver medal – second place	200 m Backstroke	(UNK) (2007)
Bronze medal – third place	200 m Breaststroke	(UNK) (2007)
Gold medal – first place	200 m Butterfly	(UNK) (2007)
Gold medal – first place	100 m Freestyle	(UNK) (2007)
Gold medal – first place	400 Individual Medley	5:11.53 (2008)
Gold medal – first place	400 m Freestyle	4:36.69(2008)
Gold medal – first place	200 m Backstroke	2:26.39(2008)
Gold medal – first place	200 m Breaststroke	2:48.14(2008)
Gold medal – first place	200 m Butterfly	2:19.53(2008)
Gold medal – first place	100 m Freestyle	56.54(2008)

Philippine National Games

Men's Swimming
Gold medal – first place	200 m Freestyle	1:55.94
Gold medal – first place	100 m Breaststroke	1:11.21
Gold medal – first place	50 m Freestyle	25.02
Gold medal – first place	200 m Individual Medley	2:11.76
Gold medal – first place	50 m Breaststroke	31.89
Silver medal – second place	200 m Medley Relay	2:30.67

=== Batang Pinoy National Championship ===
The first nationals competition had lacuna raced is the 2nd event of Batang Pinoy National Championship held in Laguna. He set his record as one of a youngest gold grabber in the competition, composed of a gold at 1:02.71 time in the event 100 LC Meter Butterfly and silver with 2:05.35 in 200 LC Meter Freestyle. His winning meets grant of "Dangal ng Pulilan Awardee" in Pulilan, Bulacan.

Nevertheless, at the 3rd Batang Pinoy National Championship in Bacolod, lacuna upshots only one silver medal at the event. Consequently, he gains a silver and bronze at 4th Batang Pinoy in Puerto Princesa, Palawan competition.

=== Philippine Olympic Festivals ===
At Nationals, Lacuna was bestowed the Most Valuable Player award in the 2nd Philippine Olympic Festival. He earned manifold medals composed of 13 gold medals in the events 100m freestyle, 200m butterfly and 50m freestyle. Although, that time lacuna was expecting only 11 gold to bring home, however, the two breaststroke events was folded gold at 100m and 200m breaststroke. He joins as his first entry in Philippine Olympic Festival competitions represented in Bulacan which were held at Vigan, Ilocos Sur in 2007.

The Philippine Olympic Festival in 2008 held in Olongapo City, lacuna obtained 13 gold same in the former game event. He races the events of 400 Individual Medley, 400 m Freestyle, 200 Backstroke, 200 m Breaststroke, 200 m Butterfly and 100 m Freestyle.

=== Palarong Pambansa ===
At 49th Palarong Pambansa, lacuna adds two gold, two silvers and bronze in 2006 held in Naga City. He swims in 100 LC Meter Backstroke where he gains silver at 1:09.67, 50 LC Meter Butterfly with bronze at 00:30.15 times, in 100 Long Course Meter Freestyle he gains gold at 1:01.41 and 100 LC Meter Butterfly silvered at 1:05.62. In 400 LC Meter Medley Relay, Lacuna grouped Gerard Gelanga, Gene Ryan Ebue and Fritz Marnold Agapay who are at 4th where 5:12.43 in final time. Nevertheless, in final results lacuna have headed the golds.

In his second event to compete in Palarong Pambansa 2007 at Koronadal City, Cotabato, he picks up only 3 bronze. Hither, on the other hand lacuna bestowed "CLRAA Consistent Highest Pointer" as of Most Valuable Player in swimming where his points from 3rd Grade school to High school made him focal by region.

=== 2011 Philippine National Games ===
At the first country show of Philippine National Games competition in 2011, Lacuna got 6 gold medals and a silver. He started swimming at Bacolod, Panaad Swimming Pool where he competed in the 200 m Freestyles, 100 m breastroke, and 50 m Freestyle events.

On the first day of the event, Lacuna competed in the 200 LC Meter Freestyle at 1:55.94 that best a qualifying entry-time. Also, he includes gold in the event 100 LC Meter Breaststroke at the time of 1:11.21 and 50 LC Meter Freestyle event that clocked at 00:25.02.

At Nationals day two, in the event 200 LC Meter Individual Medley he has gold at 2:11.76 time with a straight winning of 50 LC Meter Breaststroke at 00:31.89 clocked. However, he chucked silver in position of 200 LC Meter Medley Relay at 2:30.67 which he grouped his brother Dexter John Lacuna also includes John Philip Castillo and Armand Joshua Reyes who are compete as a Bulucan competitors in the event.

=== SEA Games ===
At the 25th Southeast Asian Games, lacuna silvered the 4 × 200 m Freestyle Relay. His 7:31.10 times is a trial in his first joining SEA Games where held in Vientiane, Laos. Lacuna batched Ryan Arabejo, Charles Walker, and Miguel Molina in Philippine Team.

In 2011, the 26th SEA Games in Palembang, Indonesia are his second combat to excel medals. However, he represented the Philippines with silver as of 1:52.23 in the event 200m freestyle. Also, he adds two bronze at 4 × 100 m and 4 × 200 m Freestyle Relays.

Lacuna sets his new national(Philippine) record in 2013 Southeast Asian Games. He clocked 00:51.52 seconds in 100 meter freestyles but fall through finishes 5th in finals.

=== 2011 World Aquatics Championships ===
In 14th FINA World Championship in Shanghai, China in 2011, Lacuna however only hits heats qualifier wherein he did not advance at the competition. He had rank 40 in Men's 200m Freestyle at 1:52.27, rank 36 in the event 200m Butterfly at 2:04.23. Indeed, he represents as a Philippine competitor who buckle-up to raise its mark.

=== 2012 Summer Olympics ===
In the 2012 London Olympic Games, Lacuna was his Olympic debut participation in one swimming event, the 200-meter freestyle competition. The Philippine Olympic Committee sent him to London after he was given a wild-card slot. Lacuna then was currently holding the record as the fastest Filipino swimmer, wherein he added two gold medals to his national games haul, and will also the youngest Filipino contingent participating in the 2012 London Olympic Games.

On July 29, 2012, at the London Aquatics Centre, Lacuna raced in heat 2 where he opposed Matias Koski (Finland), Radovan Siljevski (Serbia), Mario Montoya (Costa Rica), Sebastian Jahnsen Madico (Peru) and Raúl Martínez Colomer (Puerto Rico). Nevertheless, at the heat's results, Lacuna made ranked 36 that clocked 1:54.23 with difference at +3.07 where he swim short course racing at lane 6.

On the event, at 50 meters, he contest smooth in rank 3 that clocked 26:03 seconds. At 100 meters, he climbs in rank 2 timed at 53:82 seconds on splitting of 27.79 seconds. Underway, he is flawless over rank 2 at 150 meters timed at 1 minute and 22.67 seconds with a split of 28.85 where he countered Peru in the chase. However, lacuna concludes time at 1:52.91 where he ranked 5 of the heat with splitting time of 30.24. Consequentially, he is at 36th in the results wherein he did not qualify for semi-finals. In contrast, lacuna's coach, Pinky Brosas stated that he was speedy at 100 meters but race inconsistent at the rest meters, coach Brosas adds through Lacuna's excitement and adrenaline-rush was his grounds to speed on the first half, although, he was in the mark of his presentation to learn the consequence.

=== 2013 Philippine National Games ===
In the 2013 Philippine National Games, Lacuna bags 9 gold medals that was includes 100-meter butterfly with 58.62 seconds, 200m individual medley in 2:13.39 minutes, 50m freestyle in 24.64 seconds and 100m breaststroke in 1:11.55 minutes.

=== UAAP ===
Lacuna was awarded as co-Athlete of the Year for the Individual Sports category in the UAAP Season 78.

=== Retirement ===
On December 12, 2019, after his final game in the 2019 Southeast Asian Games, Lacuna announced his retirement from the national team after swimming for 10 years

== Records ==
=== Personal Bests ===
Event	Time	Competition	Location	Date
200m Butterfly	2:00.89	2015 Southeast Asian Games Singapore	Singapore	2015
400m Freestyle	3:59.75	Asian Games	China	2010
200m Freestyle	1:50.73	2015 Southeast Asian Games Singapore (2015)	Singapore	2015
100m Freestyle	00:51.29	2015 Southeast Asian Games	Singapore	2015
50m Freestyle	00:24.44	Southeast Asian Age Group	Philippines	2010

=== International Achievements ===
Year	Competition	Venue	Position	Event	Notes
2013	2013 Southeast Asian Games	Naypyidaw, Myanmar	6th	100 m Freestyle	00:51.52
2012	11th FINA World Swimming Championships	Istanbul, Turkey	56th	200 m Freestyle	01:54.18
2012	11th FINA World Swimming Championships	Istanbul, Turkey	74th	100 m Freestyle	00:51.57
2012	2012 Summer Olympics	London, United Kingdom	36th	200 m Freestyle	01:52.91
2012	Southeast Asian Federation Championship	Singapore	9th	100 m Freestyle	00:52.10
2011	2011 Southeast Asian Games	Palembang, Indonesia	2nd	200m freestyle	01:52.23
2011	2011 Southeast Asian Games	Palembang, Indonesia	3rd	4 × 100 m Freestyle Relay	03:27.95
2011	2011 Southeast Asian Games	Palembang, Indonesia	3rd	4 × 100 m Freestyle Relay	07:36.93
2011	14th FINA World Championships	Shanghai, China	Finisher	200 m Butterfly	02:04.23
2011	14th FINA World Championships	Shanghai, China	Finisher	200 m Freestyle	01:52.27
2011	Southeast Asian Age Group	Vietnam	2nd	100 m Freestyle	00:53.12
2011	Southeast Asian Age Group	Vietnam	2nd	200 m Butterfly	02:08.37
2011	Southeast Asian Age Group	Vietnam	2nd	200 m Butterfly	02:08.37
2010	Asian Games	Guangzhou, China	6th	4 × 100 m Freestyle Relay	03:27.32
2010	Asian Games	Guangzhou, China	7th	4 × 100 m Freestyle Relay	03:26.90
2010	Youth Olympic Games	Singapore	8th	200 m Freestyle	01:50:90
2010	Southeast Asian Age Group	Manila, Philippines	1st	200 m Freestyle	01:54.57
2010	Southeast Asian Age Group	Manila, Philippines	1st	100 m Freestyle	00:52.81
2010	Southeast Asian Age Group	Manila, Philippines	1st	400 m Freestyle	04:04.13
2010	Southeast Asian Age Group	Manila, Philippines	1st	50 m Freestyle	00:24.44
2010	Southeast Asian Age Group	Manila, Philippines	2nd	100 m Butterfly	00:57.34
2010	Singapore National Age Group Swimming Championships	Singapore	1st	200 m Butterfly	02:03.01
2010	Singapore National Age Group Swimming Championships	Singapore	1st	100 m Freestyle	00:52.13
2010	Singapore National Age Group Swimming Championships	Singapore	1st	100 m Freestyle	00:52.39
2010	Singapore National Age Group Swimming Championships	Singapore	2nd	400 m Freestyle	04:03.00
2010	NSW state age championships	Sydney, Australia	1st	200 m Freestyle	01:52.55
2010	NSW state age championships	Sydney, Australia	2nd	100 m Butterfly	00:56.43
2010	NSW state age championships	Sydney, Australia	3rd	100 m Freestyle	00:52.51
2009	2009 Southeast Asian Games	Vientiane, Laos	2nd	4 × 100 m Freestyle Relay	07:31.10
2009	2009 Asian Youth Games	Singapore	7th	100 m Freestyle	00:53.07
2009	SEA Age Group Swimming Championship	Kuala Lumpur, Malaysia	2nd	200 m Freestyle	01:55.59
2009	SEA Age Group Swimming Championship	Kuala Lumpur, Malaysia	4th	400 m Freestyle	04:09.92
2008	SEA Age Group Swimming Championship	Bangkok, Thailand	3rd	100 m Freestyle	00:54.85
2008	SEA Age Group Swimming Championship	Bangkok, Thailand	2nd	200 m Butterfly	02:13.13
2008	SEA Age Group Swimming Championship	Bangkok, Thailand	2nd	100 m Butterfly	00:58.88
2008	SEA Age Group Swimming Championship	Bangkok, Thailand	1st	400 m Freestyle	04:13.84
2008	SEA Age Group Swimming Championship	Bangkok, Thailand	1st	200 m Freestyle	01:58.57

== Personal life ==
Growing up, Lacuna's two elder brothers, Billy and Dexte, were his inspiration to be determined in being successful in swimming. His objective to swim was because of his family's zealousness in swimming. His two brothers also compete in swimming events. Another contributor to Lacuna's motivation in swimming is his admiration to fellow Filipino swimmer Akiko Thomson and Eric Buhain, and legend Michael Phelps’ great achievements in local and international swimming.

== Physique ==
In swimming, Lacuna suits for a young Filipino athlete physical attribution. His 5 feet 6 inches (168 cm) height offers propulsive row reference to a long, thin torso. He has maximum thrust that enables him belt up into water. Weighing 65 kilograms (143 lb) provide smooth hydrofoil augmentation on speed.

== Carlos Brosas ==
Carlos Brosas became Lacuna's coach once he became a member of the national swimming team. Brosas was at Trace College coaching in Los Banos, Laguna in Trace Aquatic Sports Complex where Lacuna and Alkhaldi trains and studied. Lacuna stated that Brosas will be his coach at London Olympics.
