= Aquatics at the SEA Games =

Aquatics is one of the sports at the biennial Southeast Asian Games (SEA) competition. It has been one of the sports held at the Games since the inaugural edition of the South East Asian Peninsular Games (SEAP) in 1959.

== Editions ==
=== South East Asian Peninsular Games ===
Games	Year	Host city	Host country
I	1959	Bangkok	Thailand
II	1961	Rangoon	Burma
III	1965	Kuala Lumpur	Malaysia
IV	1967	Bangkok	Thailand
V	1969	Rangoon	Burma
VI	1971	Kuala Lumpur	Malaysia
VII	1973	Singapore	Singapore
VIII	1975	Bangkok	Thailand

=== Southeast Asian Games ===
Games	Year	Host city	Host country
IX	1977	Kuala Lumpur	Malaysia
X	1979	Jakarta	Indonesia
XI	1981	Manila	Philippines
XII	1983	Singapore	Singapore
XIII	1985	Bangkok	Thailand
XIV	1987	Jakarta	Indonesia
XV	1989	Kuala Lumpur	Malaysia
XVI	1991	Manila	Philippines
XVII	1993	Singapore	Singapore
XVIII	1995	Chiang Mai	Thailand
XIX	1997	Jakarta	Indonesia
XX	1999	Bandar Seri Begawan	Brunei
XXI	2001	Kuala Lumpur	Malaysia
XXII	2003	Hanoi & Ho Chi Minh City	Vietnam
XXIII	2005	Manila, Laguna, Cebu, Bacolod	Philippines
XXIV	2007	Nakhon Ratchasima	Thailand
XXV	2009	Vientiane	Laos
XXVI	2011	Palembang & Jakarta	Indonesia
XXVII	2013	Naypyidaw	Myanmar
XXVIII	2015	Singapore	Singapore
XXIX	2017	Kuala Lumpur	Malaysia
XXX	2019	New Clark City	Philippines
XXXI	2021	Hanoi	Vietnam
XXXII	2023	Phnom Penh	Cambodia

== See also ==
- List of Southeast Asian Games records in swimming
