= Philippines women's national water polo team =

Philippines
- FINA code: PHI
- Nickname(s): Philippine Sirens
- Confederation: AASF (Asia)

The Philippines women's national water polo team represents Philippines in international women's water polo competitions and friendly matches.

== Results ==
=== Asian Games ===
Asian Games
Year	Round	Position	Pld	W	L	-
(China) 2010	Did not participate					
(South Korea) 2014	Did not participate					
(China) 2022	Did not participate					
Total	0 Titles	-				

=== Asian Cup ===
Asian Cup
Year	Round	Position	Pld	W	L	Squad
2013	-	4th Place	-	-	-	Squad
Total	0 Titles	-				

=== Southeast Asian Games ===
Southeast Asian Games
Year	Round	Position	Pld	W	L	Squad
(Indonesia) 2011	-	Withdrew	-	-	-	-
(Singapore) 2015	-	5th Place	-	-	-	Squad
(Philippines) 2019	-	3rd Place	-	-	-	Squad
Total	0 Titles	-				

=== Betawi Cup International Water Polo Tournament ===
Betawi Cup International Water Polo Tournament
Year	Round	Position	Pld	W	L	Squad
2011	-	3rd place	-	-	-	Squad
Total	0 Titles	3rd place				
