= Philippines at the 2011 World Aquatics Championships =

Sporting event delegation

Flag of Philippines

Philippines competed at the 2011 World Aquatics Championships in Shanghai, China between July 16 and 31, 2011.

== Swimming ==
Philippines qualified 3 swimmers.

Men

Athlete	Event	Heats		Semifinals		Final	
Athlete	Event	Time	Rank	Time	Rank	Time	Rank
Charles William Walker	Men's 100m Freestyle	51.72	51	did not advance			
Charles William Walker	Men's 100m Backstroke	58.82	45	did not advance			
Jessie Lacuna	Men's 200m Freestyle	1:52.27	40	did not advance			
Jessie Lacuna	Men's 200m Butterfly	2:04.23	36	did not advance			

Women

Athlete	Event	Heats		Semifinals		Final	
Athlete	Event	Time	Rank	Time	Rank	Time	Rank
Jasmine Al-Khaldi	Women's 100m Freestyle	58.02	44	did not advance			
Jasmine Al-Khaldi	Women's 100m Butterfly	1:03.69	40	did not advance			
