= Swimming at the 2025 SEA Games – Men's 50 metre butterfly =

Men's 50 metre butterfly at the 2025 SEA Games
- Venue: SAT Swimming Pool
- Date: 14 December
- Competitors: 12 from 9 nations
- Winning time: 23.24

Medalists
gold medal	Teong Tzen Wei	Singapore
silver medal	Quah Zheng Wen	Singapore
bronze medal	Logan Wataru Noguchi	Philippines

The men's 50 metre butterfly event at the 2025 SEA Games will take place on 14 December 2025 at the SAT Swimming Pool in Bangkok, Thailand.

== Schedule ==
All times are Indochina Standard Time (UTC+07:00)

Date	Time	Event
Sunday, 14 December 2025	9:10	Heats
Sunday, 14 December 2025	18:10	Final

== Records ==
Prior to this competition, the existing world, Asian, and Southeast Asian Games records were as follows.

World Record	Andriy Govorov (UKR)	22.27	Rome, Italy	1 July 2018
Asian Record	Joseph Schooling (SGP)	22.93	Budapest, Budapest	23 July 2017
Games Record	Teong Tzen Wei (SGP)	23.04	Hanoi, Vietnam	15 May 2022

== Results ==
=== Heats ===
Rank	Heat	Lane	Swimmer	Nationality	Time	Notes
1	2	4	Teong Tzen Wei	Singapore	23.45	Q
2	2	3	Joe Aditya Wijaya Kurniawan	Indonesia	24.06	Q
3	1	4	Quah Zheng Wen	Singapore	24.14	Q
4	1	5	Luong Jérémie Loïc Nino	Vietnam	24.39	Q
5	1	3	Logan Wataru Noguchi	Philippines	24.45	Q
6	2	5	Bryan Leong Xin Ren	Malaysia	24.61	Q
7	1	6	Geargchai Rutnosot	Thailand	24.93	Q
8	2	2	Samuel Maxson Septionus	Indonesia	25.00	Q
9	2	6	Navaphat Wongcharoen	Thailand	25.21	R
10	1	2	Joran Paul Jamero Orogo	Philippines	25.21	R
11	2	1	Thu Lin Myat	Myanmar	26.89	
12	2	7	Jirasak Khammavongkeo	Laos	28.05	NR

=== Final ===
Rank	Lane	Swimmer	Nationality	Time	Notes
1st place, gold medalist(s)	4	Teong Tzen Wei	Singapore	23.24	
2nd place, silver medalist(s)	3	Quah Zheng Wen	Singapore	23.57	
3rd place, bronze medalist(s)	2	Logan Wataru Noguchi	Philippines	23.97	
4	5	Joe Aditya Wijaya Kurniawan	Indonesia	24.09	
5	6	Luong Jérémie Loïc Nino	Vietnam	24.16	
6	7	Bryan Leong Xin Ren	Malaysia	24.55	
7	1	Geargchai Rutnosot	Thailand	24.59	
8	8	Samuel Maxson Septionus	Indonesia	24.91	
