= Swimming at the 2025 SEA Games – Women's 100 metre breaststroke =

Women's 100 metre breaststroke at the 2025 SEA Games
- Venue: SAT Swimming Pool
- Date: 13 December
- Competitors: 11 from 7 nations
- Winning time: 1:06.79

Medalists
gold medal	Letitia Sim	Singapore
silver medal	Phee Jinq En	Malaysia
bronze medal	Thúy Hiền Nguyễn	Vietnam

The women's 100 metre breaststroke event at the 2025 SEA Games took place on 13 December 2025 at the SAT Swimming Pool in Bangkok, Thailand.

== Schedule ==
All times are Indochina Standard Time (UTC+07:00)

Date	Time	Event
Saturday, 13 December 2025	9:31	Heats
Saturday, 13 December 2025	19:05	Final

== Records ==
Prior to this competition, the existing world, Asian, and Southeast Asian Games records were as follows.

World Record	Lilly King (USA)	1:04.13	Budapest, Hungary	25 July 2017
Asian Record	Tang Qianting (CHN)	1:04.39	Shenzhen, China	21 April 2024
Games Record	Letitia Sim (SGP)	1:07.94	Phnom Penh, Cambodia	9 May 2023

== Results ==
=== Heats ===
Rank	Heat	Lane	Swimmer	Nationality	Time	Notes
1	2	4	Letitia Sim	Singapore	1:08.73	Q
2	2	5	Thitirat Inchai	Thailand	1:10.36	Q, NR
3	1	4	Phee Jinq En	Malaysia	1:10.99	Q
4	1	5	Phiangkhwan Pawapotako	Thailand	1:11.27	Q
5	2	6	Adellia	Indonesia	1:11.56	Q
6	2	3	Thúy Hiền Nguyễn	Vietnam	1:11.95	Q
7	1	2	Angelina Bella Messina	Laos	1:12.33	Q, NR
8	1	3	Elle Nicole Tay Jiaqi	Singapore	1:12.77	Q
9	1	6	Isabelle Chiyi Buckley	Malaysia	1:15.90	R
10	2	2	Kaylonie Amphonesuh	Laos	1:19.26	R
11	2	7	Poe Tharr Ngwe Chi	Myanmar	1:23.30	

=== Final ===
Rank	Lane	Swimmer	Nationality	Time	Notes
1st place, gold medalist(s)	4	Letitia Sim	Singapore	1:06.79	GR
2nd place, silver medalist(s)	3	Phee Jinq En	Malaysia	1:10.09	
3rd place, bronze medalist(s)	7	Thúy Hiền Nguyễn	Vietnam	1:10.40	NR
4	6	Phiangkhwan Pawapotako	Thailand	1:10.42	
5	5	Thitirat Inchai	Thailand	1:10.58	
6	2	Adellia	Indonesia	1:10.92	
7	8	Elle Nicole Tay Jiaqi	Singapore	1:12.16	
8	1	Angelina Bella Messina	Laos	1:12.29	NR
