= Swimming at the 2025 SEA Games – Women's 200 metre individual medley =

Women's 200 metre individual medley at the 2025 SEA Games
- Venue: SAT Swimming Pool
- Date: 11 December
- Competitors: 11 from 6 nations
- Winning time: 2:13.42

Medalists
gold medal	Letitia Sim	Singapore
silver medal	Kamonchanok Kwanmuang	Thailand
bronze medal	Võ Thị Mỹ Tiên	Vietnam

The women's 200 metre individual medley event at the 2025 SEA Games took place on 11 December 2025 at the SAT Swimming Pool in Bangkok, Thailand.

== Schedule ==
All times are Indochina Standard Time (UTC+07:00)

Date	Time	Event
Wednesday, 11 December 2025	9:35	Heats
Wednesday, 11 December 2025	19:21	Final

== Records ==
Prior to this competition, the existing world, Asian, and Southeast Asian Games records were as follows.

World Record	Summer McIntosh (CAN)	2:05.70	Victoria, Canada	9 June 2025
Asian Record	Ye Shiwen (CHN)	2:07.57	London, United Kingdom	31 July 2012
Games Record	Nguyễn Thị Ánh Viên (SGP)	2:13.53	Singapore, Singapore	7 June 2015

== Results ==
=== Heats ===
Rank	Heat	Lane	Swimmer	Nationality	Time	Notes
1	2	4	Letitia Sim	Singapore	2:17.43	Q
2	1	4	Kamonchanok Kwanmuang	Thailand	2:18.74	Q
3	1	4	Quah Jing Wen	Singapore	2:19.22	Q
4	2	4	Xiandi Chua	Philippines	2:19.78	Q
5	2	5	Phiangkhwan Pawapotako	Thailand	2:20.47	Q
6	1	5	Angelina Bella Messina	Laos	2:21.71	Q, NR
7	1	6	Chloe Isleta	Philippines	2:22.45	Q
8	2	3	Võ Thị Mỹ Tiên	Vietnam	2:23.64	Q
9	1	2	Nguyễn Ngọc Tuyết Hân	Vietnam	2:29.28	R
10	2	2	Lynna Yeow Yi Jing	Malaysia	2:32.65	R
11	1	2	Kaylonie Amphonesuh	Laos	2:39.07	

=== Final ===
Rank	Lane	Swimmer	Nationality	Time	Notes
1st place, gold medalist(s)	4	Letitia Sim	Singapore	2:13.42	GR, NR
2nd place, silver medalist(s)	5	Kamonchanok Kwanmuang	Thailand	2:16.14	
3rd place, bronze medalist(s)	1	Võ Thị Mỹ Tiên	Vietnam	2:16.66	
4	3	Quah Jing Wen	Singapore	2:17.42	
5	6	Xiandi Chua	Philippines	2:18.01	
6	7	Chloe Isleta	Philippines	2:22.09	
7	2	Angelina Bella Messina	Laos	2:23.23	
8	8	Nguyễn Ngọc Tuyết Hân	Vietnam	2:27.40	
