= Swimming at the 2025 SEA Games – Men's 4 × 100 metre freestyle relay =

Men's 4x100 metre freestyle relay at the 2025 SEA Games
- Venue: SAT Swimming Pool
- Date: 14 December
- Competitors: 6 from 6 nations
- Winning time: 3:16.65

Medalists
gold medal	Jonathan Tan, Mikkel Lee, Ardi Azman, Quah Zheng Wen	Singapore
silver medal	Trần Văn Nguyễn Quốc, Luong Jérémie Loïc Nino, Trần Hưng Nguyên, Nguyễn Viết Tường	Vietnam
bronze medal	Yin Chuen Lim, Khiew Hoe Yean, Arvin Shaun Singh Chahal, Terence Ng Shin Jian	Malaysia

The men's 4 × 100 metre freestyle relay event at the 2025 SEA Games took place on 14 December 2025 at the SAT Swimming Pool in Bangkok, Thailand.

== Schedule ==
All times are Indochina Standard Time (UTC+07:00)

Date	Time	Event
Sunday, 14 December 2025	19:16	Final

== Records ==
Prior to this competition, the existing world, Asian, and Southeast Asian Games records were as follows.

World Record	United States; Michael Phelps (47.51); Garrett Weber-Gale (47.02); Cullen Jones (47.65); Jason Lezak (46.06)	3:08.24	Beijing, China	11 August 2008
Asian Record	China; Pan Zhanle (47.06); Chen Juner (48.00); Hong Jinquan (48.27); Wang Haoyu (47.55)	3:10.88	Hangzhou, China	28 September 2023
Games Record	Singapore; Darren Chua (50.05); Jonathan Tan (49.10); Quah Zheng Wen (48.40); Joseph Schooling (49.27)	3:16.82	Capas, Philippines	6 December 2019

== Results ==
=== Final ===
Rank	Lane	Swimmer	Nationality	Time	Notes
1st place, gold medalist(s)	4	Jonathan Tan (49.67); Mikkel Lee (48.25); Ardi Azman (50.03); Quah Zheng Wen (48.70)	Singapore	3:16.65	GR
2nd place, silver medalist(s)	3	Trần Hưng Nguyên (50.60); Luong Jérémie Loïc Nino (49.42); Nguyễn Viết Tường (50.29); Trần Văn Nguyễn Quốc (49.70)	Vietnam	3:20.01	NR
3rd place, bronze medalist(s)	6	Khiew Hoe Yean (50.69); Yin Chuen Lim (49.76); Terence Ng Shin Jian (50.68); Arvin Shaun Singh Chahal (49.74)	Malaysia	3:20.87	
4	2	Jeremy Elyon Master Ganesha (51.25); Kevin Erlangga Prayitno (50.61); Joe Aditya Wijaya Kurniawan (50.46); Jason Donovan Yusuf (49.60)	Indonesia	3:21.92	NR
5	5	Pongpanod Trithan (50.26); Tonnam Kanteemool (50.46); Kittapart Kaewmart (51.36); Surasit Thongdeang (50.10)	Thailand	3:22.18	
6	7	Joel Ling Thai Yu (52.72); Zeke Chan (55.10); Muhammad Isa Ahmad (55.46); Nur Haziq bin Samil (56.32)	Brunei	3:39.60	
