= Swimming at the 2025 SEA Games – Women's 50 metre breaststroke =

Women's 50 metre breaststroke at the 2025 SEA Games
- Venue: SAT Swimming Pool
- Date: 10 December
- Competitors: 12 from 8 nations
- Winning time: 31.03

Medalists
gold medal	Letitia Sim	Thailand
silver medal	Jenjira Srisa-ard	Vietnam
bronze medal	Phee Jinq En	Malaysia
bronze medal	Saovanee Boonamphai	Thailand

The women's 50 metre breaststroke event at the 2025 SEA Games took place on 10 December 2025 at the SAT Swimming Pool in Bangkok, Thailand.

== Schedule ==
All times are Indochina Standard Time (UTC+07:00)

Date	Time	Event
Wednesday, 10 December 2025	9:26	Heats
Wednesday, 10 December 2025	18:44	Final

== Records ==
Prior to this competition, the existing world, Asian, and Southeast Asian Games records were as follows.

World Record	Rūta Meilutytė (LTU)	29.16	Fukuoka, Japan	30 July 2023
Asian Record	Tang Qianting (CHN)	29.51	Doha, Qatar	18 February 2024
Games Record	Jenjira Srisaard (THA)	31.22	Phnom Penh, Cambodia	6 May 2023

== Results ==
=== Heats ===
Rank	Heat	Lane	Swimmer	Nationality	Time	Notes
1	2	4	Letitia Sim	Singapore	31.47	Q
2	1	4	Phee Jinq En	Malaysia	31.87	Q
3	2	5	Jenjira Srisaard	Thailand	32.00	Q
4	2	3	Thúy Hiền Nguyễn	Vietnam	32.15	Q, NR
5	1	5	Saovanee Boonamphai	Thailand	32.32	Q
6	1	3	Adellia	Indonesia	32.51	Q
7	1	6	Miranda Cristina Renner	Philippines	33.08	Q
8	2	6	Isabelle Chiyi Buckley	Malaysia	33.39	Q
9	2	2	Elle Nicole Tay Jiaqi	Singapore	33.95	R
10	2	7	Poe Tharr Ngwe Chi	Myanmar	36.48	R
11	1	2	Tamsiri Christine Niyomxay	Laos	39.04	
12	1	7	Thipthida Chantha	Laos	44.31	

=== Final ===
Rank	Lane	Swimmer	Nationality	Time	Notes
1st place, gold medalist(s)	4	Letitia Sim	Singapore	31.03	GR
2nd place, silver medalist(s)	3	Jenjira Srisaard	Thailand	31.52	
3rd place, bronze medalist(s)	5	Phee Jinq En	Malaysia	31.71	
3rd place, bronze medalist(s)	2	Saovanee Boonamphai	Thailand	31.71	
5	6	Thúy Hiền Nguyễn	Vietnam	31.95	NR
6	1	Miranda Cristina Renner	Philippines	32.44	
7	7	Adellia	Indonesia	32.77	
8	8	Isabelle Chiyi Buckley	Malaysia	33.81	
