= Swimming at the 2025 SEA Games – Women's 200 metre freestyle =

Women's 200 metre freestyle at the 2025 SEA Games
- Venue: SAT Swimming Pool
- Date: 11 December
- Competitors: 11 from 7 nations
- Winning time: 2:00.02

Medalists
gold medal	Gan Ching Hwee	Singapore
silver medal	Kayla Sanchez	Philippines
bronze medal	Maria Nedelko	Thailand

The Women's 200 metre freestyle event at the 2025 SEA Games took place on 11 December 2025 at the SAT Swimming Pool in Bangkok, Thailand.

== Schedule ==
All times are Indochina Standard Time (UTC+07:00)

Date	Time	Event
Thursday, 11 December 2025	9:19	Heats
Thursday, 11 December 2025	18:41	Final

== Records ==
Prior to this competition, the existing world, Asian and Games records were as follows.

World Record	Ariarne Titmus (AUS)	1:52.23	Brisbane, Australia	12 June 2024
Asian Record	Siobhan Haughey (HKG)	1:53.92	Tokyo, Japan	28 July 2021
Games Record	Nguyễn Thị Ánh Viên (VIE)	1:59.24	Kuala Lumpur, Malaysia	26 August 2017

== Results ==
=== Heats ===
Rank	Heat	Lane	Swimmer	Nationality	Time	Notes
1	2	4	Gan Ching Hwee	Singapore	2:03.74	Q
2	1	3	Maria Nedelko	Thailand	2:05.62	Q
3	1	4	Kayla Sanchez	Philippines	2:05.89	Q
4	1	5	Quah Jing Wen	Singapore	2:06.09	Q
4	2	3	Heather White	Philippines	2:06.16	Q
6	1	7	Serenna Karmelita Muslim	Indonesia	2:07.36	Q
7	2	5	Kamonchanok Kwanmuang	Thailand	2:08.33	Q
8	2	6	Nguyễn Khả Nhi	Vietnam	2:08.70	Q
9	1	2	Ariana Dirkzwager	Laos	2:11.01	R
10	2	2	Kelly Teo Yao	Malaysia	2:11.92	R
11	1	6	Izzy Dwifaiva Hefrisyanthi	Indonesia	2:12.15	

=== Final ===
Rank	Lane	Swimmer	Nationality	Time	Notes
1st place, gold medalist(s)	4	Gan Ching Hwee	Singapore	2:00.02	
2nd place, silver medalist(s)	3	Kayla Sanchez	Philippines	2:02.19	
3rd place, bronze medalist(s)	5	Maria Nedelko	Thailand	2:02.71	
4	1	Kamonchanok Kwanmuang	Thailand	2:02.76	
5	2	Heather White	Philippines	2:03.51	
6	6	Quah Jing Wen	Singapore	2:04.29	
7	8	Nguyễn Khả Nhi	Vietnam	2:04.57	
8	7	Serenna Karmelita Muslim	Indonesia	2:07.96	
