= Swimming at the 2025 SEA Games – Women's 100 metre freestyle =

Women's 100 metre freestyle at the 2025 SEA Games
- Venue: SAT Swimming Pool
- Date: 12 December
- Competitors: 15 from 8 nations
- Winning time: 54.82

Medalists
gold medal	Kayla Sanchez	Philippines
silver medal	Heather White	Philippines
bronze medal	Quah Ting Wen	Singapore

The Women's 100 metre freestyle event at the 2025 SEA Games took place on 12 December 2025 at the SAT Swimming Pool in Bangkok, Thailand.

== Schedule ==
All times are Indochina Standard Time (UTC+07:00)

Date	Time	Event
Friday, 12 December 2025	9:00	Heats
Friday, 12 December 2025	18:00	Final

== Records ==
Prior to this competition, the existing world, Asian and Games records were as follows.

World Record	Sarah Sjöström (SWE)	51.71	Budapest, Hungary	23 July 2017
Asian Record	Siobhan Haughey (HKG)	52.02	Berlin, Germany	8 October 2023
Games Record	Quah Ting Wen (SGP)	54.74	Capas, Philippines	4 December 2019

== Results ==
=== Heats ===
Rank	Heat	Lane	Swimmer	Nationality	Time	Notes
1	1	4	Heather White	Philippines	55.89	Q
2	3	4	Kayla Sanchez	Philippines	56.00	Q
3	3	5	Nguyễn Thúy Hiền	Vietnam	57.40	Q
4	3	3	Phạm Thị Vân	Vietnam	57.45	Q
4	2	3	Nadia Aisha Nurazmi	Indonesia	57.53	Q
6	1	3	Maria Nedelko	Thailand	57.84	Q
7	1	5	Ashley Yi Xuan Lim	Singapore	58.53	Q
8	1	4	Quah Ting Wen	Singapore	58.59	Q
9	3	6	Serenna Karmelita Muslim	Indonesia	58.92	R
10	2	6	Wong Shi Qi	Malaysia	59.64	R
11	2	7	Ariana Dirkzwager	Laos	59.94	
12	1	6	Lynna Yi Jing Yeow	Malaysia	1:00.10	
13	2	2	Oo Nan Honey	Myanmar	1:02.69	
14	3	2	Thakhin Aung Phyo Thet	Myanmar	1:10.61	
15	1	2	Thipthida Chantha	Laos	1:11.96	

=== Final ===
Rank	Lane	Swimmer	Nationality	Time	Notes
1st place, gold medalist(s)	5	Kayla Sanchez	Philippines	54.82	
2nd place, silver medalist(s)	4	Heather White	Philippines	55.36	
3rd place, bronze medalist(s)	1	Quah Ting Wen	Singapore	55.60	
4	3	Nguyễn Thúy Hiền	Vietnam	56.06	
5	2	Nadia Aisha Nurazmi	Indonesia	56.50	
6	6	Phạm Thị Vân	Vietnam	57.25	
7	7	Ashley Yi Xuan Lim	Singapore	57.69	
8	8	Serenna Karmelita Muslim	Indonesia	58.30	
