= Swimming at the 2025 SEA Games – Women's 50 metre freestyle =

Women's 50 metre freestyle at the 2025 SEA Games
- Venue: SAT Swimming Pool
- Date: 14 December
- Competitors: 15 from 9 nations
- Winning time: 25.03

Medalists
gold medal	Amanda Lim	Singapore
silver medal	Kayla Sanchez	Philippines
bronze medal	Heather White	Philippines

The Women's 50 metre freestyle event at the 2025 SEA Games took place on 14 December 2025 at the SAT Swimming Pool in Bangkok, Thailand.

== Schedule ==
All times are Indochina Standard Time (UTC+07:00)

Date	Time	Event
Sunday, 14 December 2025	9:00	Heats
Sunday, 14 December 2025	18:00	Final

== Records ==
Prior to this competition, the existing world, Asian and Games records were as follows.

World Record	Sarah Sjöström (SWE)	23.61	Fukuoka, Japan	29 July 2023
Asian Record	Liu Xiang (CHN)	23.97	Xi'an, China	26 September 2021
Games Record	Quah Ting Wen (SGP)	25.04	Phnom Penh, Cambodia	10 May 2023

== Results ==
=== Heats ===
Rank	Heat	Lane	Swimmer	Nationality	Time	Notes
1	1	4	Kayla Sanchez	Philippines	25.51	Q
2	3	4	Amanda Lim	Singapore	25.72	Q
3	3	5	Heather White	Philippines	25.84	Q
4	2	4	Quah Ting Wen	Singapore	25.87	Q
4	1	3	Nadia Aisha Nurazmi	Indonesia	26.08	Q, NR
6	2	3	Adelia Chantika Aulia	Indonesia	26.18	Q
7	1	5	Nguyễn Thúy Hiền	Vietnam	26.35	Q
8	2	6	Ploy Leelayana	Thailand	26.58	Q
9	3	6	Wong Shi Qi	Malaysia	26.86	R
10	3	3	Phạm Thị Vân	Vietnam	27.36	R
11	1	6	Ariana Dirkzwager	Laos	27.97	
12	2	2	Yan Htet Wun	Myanmar	29.08	
13	3	2	Tamsiri Christine Niyomxay	Laos	30.12	
14	1	2	Thakhin Aung Phyo Thet	Myanmar	30.59	
15	3	7	Salena Marlin	Timor-Leste	40.51	

=== Final ===
Rank	Lane	Swimmer	Nationality	Time	Notes
1st place, gold medalist(s)	5	Amanda Lim	Singapore	25.03	GR
2nd place, silver medalist(s)	4	Kayla Sanchez	Philippines	25.15	NR
3rd place, bronze medalist(s)	3	Heather White	Philippines	25.38	
4	6	Quah Ting Wen	Singapore	25.42	
5	2	Nadia Aisha Nurazmi	Indonesia	25.68	NR
6	1	Nguyễn Thúy Hiền	Vietnam	25.70	NR
7	7	Adelia Chantika Aulia	Indonesia	26.44	
8	8	Ploy Leelayana	Thailand	26.56	
