= Swimming at the 2025 SEA Games – Women's 200 metre breaststroke =

Women's 200 metre breaststroke at the 2025 SEA Games
- Venue: SAT Swimming Pool
- Date: 14 December
- Competitors: 9 from 6 nations
- Winning time: 2:27.37

Medalists
gold medal	Letitia Sim	Singapore
silver medal	Pimchanok Chinveeraphan	Thailand
bronze medal	Adellia	Indonesia

The women's 200 metre breaststroke event at the 2025 SEA Games took place on 14 December 2025 at the SAT Swimming Pool in Bangkok, Thailand.

== Schedule ==
All times are Indochina Standard Time (UTC+07:00)

Date	Time	Event
Sunday, 14 December 2025	9:17	Heats
Sunday, 14 December 2025	18:23	Final

== Records ==
Prior to this competition, the existing world, Asian, and Southeast Asian Games records were as follows.

World Record	Evgeniia Chikunova (RUS)	2:17.55	Kazan, Russia	21 April 2023
Asian Record	Rie Kaneto (JPN)	2:19.65	Tokyo, Japan	9 April 2016
Games Record	Letitia Sim (SGP)	2:28.49	Phnom Penh, Cambodia	10 May 2023

== Results ==
=== Heats ===
Rank	Heat	Lane	Swimmer	Nationality	Time	Notes
1	2	4	Letitia Sim	Singapore	2:33.84	Q
2	1	6	Angelina Bella Messina	Laos	2:37.22	Q, NR
3	2	5	Phiangkhwan Pawapotako	Thailand	2:37.33	Q
4	1	5	Elle Nicole Tay Jiaqi	Singapore	2:37.77	Q
5	1	4	Pimchanok Chinveeraphan	Thailand	2:38.25	Q
6	2	3	Adellia	Indonesia	2:38.68	Q
7	1	3	Kyla Louise Bulaga	Philippines	2:43.30	Q
8	1	2	Kaylonie Amphonesuh	Laos	2:54.06	Q
9	2	2	Poe Tharr Ngwe Chi	Myanmar	3:13.52	R

=== Final ===
Rank	Lane	Swimmer	Nationality	Time	Notes
1st place, gold medalist(s)	4	Letitia Sim	Singapore	2:27.37	GR
2nd place, silver medalist(s)	2	Pimchanok Chinveeraphan	Thailand	2:31.50	
3rd place, bronze medalist(s)	7	Adellia	Indonesia	2:32.50	
4	3	Phiangkhwan Pawapotako	Thailand	2:33.48	
5	6	Elle Nicole Tay Jiaqi	Singapore	2:34.53	
6	5	Angelina Bella Messina	Laos	2:37.79	
7	1	Kyla Louise Bulaga	Philippines	2:42.40	
8	8	Kaylonie Amphonesuh	Laos	2:52.60	
