= List of Laotian records in swimming =

Laotian swimming records

The Laotian records in swimming are the fastest ever performances of swimmers from Laos, which are recognised and ratified by the Lao Swimming Federation.

All records were set in finals unless noted otherwise.

== Long Course (50 m) ==
=== Men ===
Event	Time		Name	Club	Date	Meet	Location	Ref
50 m freestyle	25.79	h	Santisouk Inthavong	Laos	26 July 2019	World Championships	Gwangju, South Korea	
100 m freestyle	58.54	h	Sayasone Phothivouth	Laos	6 May 2023	Southeast Asian Games	Phnom Penh, Cambodia	
200 m freestyle	2:20.64		Thirakul Phixaiyadeth	-		-		
400 m freestyle								
800 m freestyle								
1500 m freestyle								
50 m backstroke	30.78	h	Thirakul Phixaiyadeth	Laos	17 May 2022	Southeast Asian Games	Hanoi, Vietnam	
100 m backstroke	1:08.60	h	Thirakul Phixaiyadeth	Laos	6 May 2023	Southeast Asian Games	Phnom Penh, Cambodia	
200 m backstroke								
50 m breaststroke	28.39		Steven Insixiengmai	Laos	15 December 2025	Southeast Asian Games	Bangkok, Thailand	
100 m breaststroke	1:03.60		Steven Insixiengmai	-		-		
200 m breaststroke	2:21.76		Steven Insixiengmai	-		-		
50 m butterfly	28.05	h	Jirasak Khammavongkeo	Laos	14 December 2025	Southeast Asian Games	Bangkok, Thailand	
100 m butterfly	1:09.07	h	Ryuto Saysanavongphet	Laos	13 December 2025	Southeast Asian Games	Bangkok, Thailand	
200 m butterfly								
200 m individual medley	2:40.26	h	Ryuto Saysanavongphet	Laos	6 May 2023	Southeast Asian Games	Phnom Penh, Cambodia	
400 m individual medley								
4×100 m freestyle relay								
4×200 m freestyle relay								
4×100 m medley relay								

Legend: # – Record awaiting ratification by Lao Swimming Federation; WR – World record; AS – Asian record;
Records not set in finals: h – heat; sf – semifinal; r – relay 1st leg; rh – relay heat 1st leg; b – B final; † – en route to final mark; tt – time trial

=== Women ===
Event	Time		Name	Club	Date	Meet	Location	Ref
50 m freestyle	27.90	h	Ariana Dirkzwager	Laos	10 May 2023	Southeast Asian Games	Phnom Penh, Cambodia	
100 m freestyle	59.16	h	Ariana Dirkzwager	Laos	15 February 2024	World Championships	Doha, Qatar	
200 m freestyle	2:07.22	h	Ariana Dirkzwager	Laos	28 July 2024	Olympic Games	Paris, France	
400 m freestyle	5:10.48	h	Kaylonie Amphonesuh	Laos	12 December 2025	Southeast Asian Games	Bangkok, Thailand	
800 m freestyle	10:35.48		Kaylonie Amphonesuh	Laos	15 December 2025	Southeast Asian Games	Bangkok, Thailand	
1500 m freestyle								
50 m backstroke	30.96	h	Astrid Dirkzwager	Laos	7 May 2023	Southeast Asian Games	Phnom Penh, Cambodia	
100 m backstroke	1:08.76	h	Astrid Dirkzwager	Laos	13 December 2025	Southeast Asian Games	Bangkok, Thailand	
200 m backstroke	2:19.52		Astrid Dirkzwager	-		-		
50 m breaststroke	33.68	†	Angelina Messina	Laos	13 December 2025	Southeast Asian Games	Bangkok, Thailand	
100 m breaststroke	1:12.29		Angelina Messina	Laos	13 December 2025	Southeast Asian Games	Bangkok, Thailand	
200 m breaststroke	2:37.22	h	Angelina Messina	Laos	14 December 2025	Southeast Asian Games	Bangkok, Thailand	
50 m butterfly	32.63	h	Daviau Southada	Laos	11 May 2023	Southeast Asian Games	Phnom Penh, Cambodia	
100 m butterfly								
200 m butterfly								
200 m individual medley	2:21.71	h	Angelina Messina	Laos	11 December 2025	Southeast Asian Games	Bangkok, Thailand	
400 m individual medley								
4×100 m freestyle relay	4:01.88		Ariana Dirkzwager (59.62); Makelyta Singsombath (1:02.88); Angelina Messina (59.93); Astrid Dirkzwager (59.45)	Laos	6 May 2023	Southeast Asian Games	Phnom Penh, Cambodia	
4×200 m freestyle relay								
4×100 m medley relay								

Legend: # – Record awaiting ratification by Lao Swimming Federation; WR – World record; AS – Asian record;
Records not set in finals: h – heat; sf – semifinal; r – relay 1st leg; rh – relay heat 1st leg; b – B final; † – en route to final mark; tt – time trial

=== Mixed relay ===
Event	Time	Name	Club	Date	Meet	Location	Ref
4×100 m freestyle relay							
4×100 m medley relay	3:57.01	Ariana Dirkzwager (1:08.30); Steven Insixienmai (1:03.83); Angelina Messina (1:03.99); Sayasone Phothivouth (58.40)	Laos	9 May 2023	Southeast Asian Games	Phnom Penh, Cambodia	

Legend: # – Record awaiting ratification by Lao Swimming Federation; WR – World record; AS – Asian record;
Records not set in finals: h – heat

== Short Course (25 m) ==
=== Men ===
Event	Time		Name	Club	Date	Meet	Location	Ref
50 m freestyle	25.48	h	Santisouk Inthavong	Laos	13 December 2018	World Championships	Hangzhou, China	
100 m freestyle	1:01.66	h	Phathana Inthavong	Laos	6 December 2014	World Championships	Doha, Qatar	
200 m freestyle								
400 m freestyle								
800 m freestyle								
1500 m freestyle								
50 m backstroke	29.82	h	Santisouk Inthavong	Laos	13 December 2018	World Championships	Hangzhou, China	
100 m backstroke	1:10.52	h	Phathana Inthavong	Laos	3 December 2014	World Championships	Doha, Qatar	
200 m backstroke								
50 m breaststroke	28.45	h, †	Steven Insixiengmai	Laos	11 December 2024	World Championships	Budapest, Hungary	
100 m breaststroke	1:00.36	h	Steven Insixiengmai	Laos	11 December 2024	World Championships	Budapest, Hungary	
200 m breaststroke	2:14.37	h	Steven Insixiengmai	Laos	13 December 2024	World Championships	Budapest, Hungary	
50 m butterfly	28.84	h	Sergey Sihanouvong	Laos	9 December 2016	World Championships	Windsor, Canada	
100 m butterfly								
200 m butterfly								
100 m individual medley								
200 m individual medley								
400 m individual medley								
4×50 m freestyle relay								
4×100 m freestyle relay								
4×200 m freestyle relay								
4×50 m medley relay								
4×100 m medley relay								

Legend: # – Record awaiting ratification by Lao Swimming Federation; WR – World record; AS – Asian record;
Records not set in finals: h – heat; sf – semifinal; r – relay 1st leg; rh – relay heat 1st leg; b – B final; † – en route to final mark; tt – time trial

=== Women ===
Event	Time		Name	Club	Date	Meet	Location	Ref
50m freestyle	30.61	h, †	Eleonora Singsombath	Laos	11 December 2018	World Championships	Hangzhou, China	
100m freestyle	1:05.42	h, †	Eleonora Singsombath	Laos	11 December 2018	World Championships	Hangzhou, China	
200m freestyle	2:20.13	h	Eleonora Singsombath	Laos	11 December 2018	World Championships	Hangzhou, China	
400 m freestyle								
800 m freestyle								
1500 m freestyle								
50m backstroke	34.25	h, †	Eleonora Singsombath	Laos	13 December 2018	World Championships	Hangzhou, China	
100m backstroke	1:12.84	h, †	Eleonora Singsombath	Laos	13 December 2018	World Championships	Hangzhou, China	
200m backstroke	2:37.27	h	Eleonora Singsombath	Laos	13 December 2018	World Championships	Hangzhou, China	
50m breaststroke	32.96	h, †	Angelina Messina	Laos	11 December 2024	World Championships	Budapest, Hungary	
100 m breaststroke	1:09.95	h	Angelina Messina	Laos	11 December 2024	World Championships	Budapest, Hungary	
200 m breaststroke	2:32.55	h	Angelina Messina	Laos	13 December 2024	World Championships	Budapest, Hungary	
50m butterfly	33.98	h	Veomany Siriphone	Laos	4 December 2014	World Championships	Doha, Qatar	
100 m butterfly								
200 m butterfly								
100 m individual medley								
200 m individual medley								
400 m individual medley								
4×50 m freestyle relay								
4×100 m freestyle relay								
4×200 m freestyle relay								
4×50 m medley relay								
4×100 m medley relay								

Legend: # – Record awaiting ratification by Lao Swimming Federation; WR – World record; AS – Asian record;
Records not set in finals: h – heat; sf – semifinal; r – relay 1st leg; rh – relay heat 1st leg; b – B final; † – en route to final mark; tt – time trial
