= Swimming at the 2025 SEA Games – Women's 800 metre freestyle =

Women's 800 metre freestyle at the 2025 SEA Games
- Venue: SAT Swimming Pool
- Date: 15 December
- Competitors: 10 from 8 nations
- Winning time: 8:33.13

Medalists
gold medal	Gan Ching Hwee	Singapore
silver medal	Võ Thị Mỹ Tiên	Vietnam
bronze medal	Kamonchanok Kwanmuang	Vietnam

The Women's 800 metre freestyle event at the 2025 SEA Games took place on 15 December 2025 at the SAT Swimming Pool in Bangkok, Thailand.

== Schedule ==
All times are Indochina Standard Time (UTC+07:00)

Date	Time	Event
Monday, 15 December 2025	18:23	Final

== Records ==
Prior to this competition, the existing world, Asian and Games records were as follows.

World Record	Katie Ledecky (USA)	8:04.12	Victoria, Canada	3 May 2025
Asian Record	Li Bingjie (CHN)	8:13.31	Fukuoka, Japan	29 July 2023
Games Record	Nguyễn Thị Ánh Viên (VIE)	8:34.85	Singapore, Singapore	6 June 2015

== Results ==
=== Final ===
Rank	Heat	Lane	Swimmer	Nationality	Time	Notes
1st place, gold medalist(s)	2	4	Gan Ching Hwee	Singapore	8:33.13	GR
2nd place, silver medalist(s)	2	3	Võ Thị Mỹ Tiên	Vietnam	8:49.02	
3rd place, bronze medalist(s)	2	5	Kamonchanok Kwanmuang	Thailand	8:52.17	
4	2	6	Nguyễn Khả Nhi	Vietnam	8:54.51	
4	2	2	Thitirat Charoensup	Thailand	9:05.35	
6	2	1	Victoria Carrie Lim Yiyan	Singapore	9:08.73	
7	2	7	Izzy Dwifaiva Hefrisyanthi	Indonesia	9:11.26	
8	1	5	Kyla Louise Bulaga	Philippines	9:30.66	
9	1	4	Tan Rui Nee	Malaysia	9:35.39	
10	1	3	Kaylonie Amphonesuh	Laos	10:35.48	NR
