= Swimming at the 2025 SEA Games – Women's 100 metre backstroke =

Women's 100 metre backstroke at the 2025 SEA Games
- Venue: SAT Swimming Pool
- Date: 13 December
- Competitors: 13 from 7 nations
- Winning time: 1:02.35

Medalists
gold medal	Kayla Sanchez	Philippines
silver medal	Mia Millar	Thailand
bronze medal	Flairene Candrea	Indonesia

The women's 100 metre backstroke event at the 2025 SEA Games took place on 13 December 2025 at the SAT Swimming Pool in Bangkok, Thailand.

== Schedule ==
All times are Indochina Standard Time (UTC+07:00)

Date	Time	Event
Saturday, 13 December 2025	9:14	Heats
Saturday, 13 December 2025	18:25	Final

== Records ==
Prior to this competition, the existing world, Asian and Games records were as follows.

World Record	Regan Smith (USA)	57.13	Indianapolis, United States	18 June 2024
Asian Record	Aya Terakawa (JPN)	58.70	Barcelona, Spain	4 August 2013
Games Record	Teia Salvino (PHI)	1:01.64	Phnom Penh, Cambodia	9 May 2023

== Results ==
=== Heats ===
Rank	Heat	Lane	Swimmer	Nationality	Time	Notes
1	1	5	Levenia Sim	Singapore	1:03.44	Q
2	1	3	Adelia Chantika Aulia	Indonesia	1:03.50	Q
3	1	4	Flairene Candrea	Indonesia	1:03.50	Q
4	2	4	Kayla Sanchez	Philippines	1:03.64	Q
5	2	3	Mia Millar	Thailand	1:04.26	Q
6	2	5	Xiandi Chua	Philippines	1:04.58	Q
7	2	6	Chong Xin Lin	Malaysia	1:04.84	Q
8	1	2	Julia Yeo Shu Ning	Singapore	1:04.93	Q
9	2	2	Vivian Tee Xin Ling	Malaysia	1:06.53	R
10	1	6	Kanistha Tungnapakorn	Thailand	1:06.77	R
11	1	1	Astrid Dirkzwager	Laos	1:08.76	NR
12	2	7	Yan Htet Wun	Myanmar	1:13.87	
13	2	1	Anyalynn Phouleuanghong	Laos	1:31.92	

=== Final ===
Rank	Lane	Swimmer	Nationality	Time	Notes
1st place, gold medalist(s)	6	Kayla Sanchez	Philippines	1:02.35	
2nd place, silver medalist(s)	2	Mia Millar	Thailand	1:02.52	NR
3rd place, bronze medalist(s)	3	Flairene Candrea	Indonesia	1:02.60	
4	5	Adelia Chantika Aulia	Indonesia	1:02.94	
5	4	Levenia Sim	Singapore	1:02.97	
6	7	Chong Xin Lin	Malaysia	1:04.30	
7	1	Julia Yeo Shu Ning	Singapore	1:04.75	
8	8	Vivian Tee Xin Ling	Malaysia	1:05.35	
