= Swimming at the 2025 SEA Games – Men's 200 metre freestyle =

Men's 200 metre freestyle at the 2025 SEA Games
- Venue: SAT Swimming Pool
- Date: 13 December
- Competitors: 12 from 8 nations
- Winning time: 1:48.64

Medalists
gold medal	Khiew Hoe Yean	Malaysia
silver medal	Trần Văn Nguyễn Quốc	Vietnam
bronze medal	Arvin Shaun Singh Chahal	Malaysia

The men's 200 metre freestyle event at the 2025 SEA Games took place on 13 December 2025 at the SAT Swimming Pool in Bangkok, Thailand.

== Schedule ==
All times are Indochina Standard Time (UTC+07:00)

Date	Time	Event
Saturday, 13 December 2025	9:22	Heats
Saturday, 13 December 2025	18:45	Final

== Records ==
Prior to this competition, the existing world, Asian, and Southeast Asian Games records were as follows.

World Record	Paul Biedermann (GER)	1:42.00	Rome, Italy	28 July 2009
Asian Record	Sun Yang (CHN)	1:44.39	Budapest, Hungary	25 July 2017
Games Record	Welson Sim (MAS)	1:47.36	Kuala Lumpur, Malaysia	24 August 2017

== Results ==
=== Heats ===
Rank	Heat	Lane	Swimmer	Nationality	Time	Notes
1	2	5	Khiew Hoe Yean	Malaysia	1:50.33	Q
2	1	2	Made Aubrey Jaya	Indonesia	1:51.34	Q
3	1	5	Arvin Shaun Singh Chahal	Malaysia	1:51.68	Q
4	1	4	Nguyễn Huy Hoàng	Vietnam	1:51.69	Q
5	2	2	Nicholas Karel Subagyo	Indonesia	1:51.71	Q
6	2	6	Gian Christopher Santos	Philippines	1:52.13	Q
7	2	3	Ardi Zulhimi Bin Mohamed Azman	Singapore	1:52.17	Q
8	1	6	Trần Văn Nguyễn Quốc	Vietnam	1:52.23	Q
9	1	3	Pongpanod Trithan	Thailand	1:52.27	R
10	2	7	Wongsakorn Patsamarn	Thailand	1:53.14	R
11	2	1	Han Phone Pyae	Myanmar	2:01.06	
12	1	7	Jolanio Guterres	Timor-Leste	2:50.85	

=== Final ===
Rank	Lane	Swimmer	Nationality	Time	Notes
1st place, gold medalist(s)	4	Khiew Hoe Yean	Malaysia	1:48.64	
2nd place, silver medalist(s)	8	Trần Văn Nguyễn Quốc	Vietnam	1:48.70	
3rd place, bronze medalist(s)	3	Arvin Shaun Singh Chahal	Malaysia	1:50.43	
4	6	Nguyễn Huy Hoàng	Vietnam	1:50.68	
5	2	Nicholas Karel Subagyo	Indonesia	1:50.86	
6	5	Made Aubrey Jaya	Indonesia	1:50.97	
7	1	Ardi Zulhimi Bin Mohamed Azman	Singapore	1:51.32	
8	7	Gian Christopher Santos	Philippines	1:51.54	
