= Swimming at the 2025 SEA Games – Men's 50 metre breaststroke =

Men's 50 metre breaststroke at the 2025 SEA Games
- Venue: SAT Swimming Pool
- Date: 15 December
- Competitors: 10 from 6 nations
- Winning time: 27.68

Medalists
gold medal	Chan Chun Ho	Singapore
silver medal	Andrew Goh	Malaysia
bronze medal	Felix Viktor Iberle	Indonesia

The men's 50 metre breaststroke event at the 2025 SEA Games will take place on 15 December 2025 at the SAT Swimming Pool in Bangkok, Thailand.

== Schedule ==
All times are Indochina Standard Time (UTC+07:00)

Date	Time	Event
Monday, 15 December 2025	9:06	Heats
Monday, 15 December 2025	18:04	Final

== Records ==
Prior to this competition, the existing world, Asian, and Southeast Asian Games records were as follows.

World Record	Adam Peaty (GBR)	25.95	Budapest, Hungary	25 July 2017
Asian Record	Qin Haiyang (CHN)	26.20	Fukuoka, Japan	25 July 2023
Games Record	Felix Viktor Iberle (INA)	27.56	Phnom Penh, Cambodia	11 May 2023

== Results ==
=== Heats ===
Rank	Heat	Lane	Swimmer	Nationality	Time	Notes
1	2	4	Felix Viktor Iberle	Indonesia	28.00	Q
2	1	4	Andrew Goh	Malaysia	28.18	Q
3	2	3	Maximillian Ang	Singapore	28.26	Q
4	1	3	Phạm Thanh Bảo	Vietnam	28.38	Q
5	2	5	Chan Chun Ho	Singapore	28.49	Q
6	1	5	Muhammad Dwiky Raharjo	Indonesia	28.77	Q
7	2	7	Steven Insixiengmay	Laos	29.12	Q
8	2	6	Thanonchai Janruksa	Thailand	29.56	Q
9	1	6	Rachasil Mahamongkol	Thailand	29.67	R
10	1	2	Jirasak Khammavongkeo	Laos	33.54	R

=== Final ===
Rank	Lane	Swimmer	Nationality	Time	Notes
1st place, gold medalist(s)	2	Chan Chun Ho	Singapore	27.68	NR
2nd place, silver medalist(s)	5	Andrew Goh	Malaysia	27.96	
3rd place, bronze medalist(s)	4	Felix Viktor Iberle	Indonesia	28.02	
4	6	Phạm Thanh Bảo	Vietnam	28.28	
5	3	Maximillian Ang	Singapore	28.32	
6	1	Steven Insixiengmay	Laos	28.39	NR
7	7	Muhammad Dwiky Raharjo	Indonesia	28.55	
8	8	Thanonchai Janruksa	Thailand	28.97	
