= Swimming at the 2025 SEA Games – Men's 100 metre butterfly =

Men's 100 metre butterfly at the 2025 SEA Games
- Venue: SAT Swimming Pool
- Date: 13 December
- Competitors: 13 from 8 nations
- Winning time: 52.25

Medalists
gold medal	Quah Zheng Wen	Singapore
silver medal	Joe Aditya Wijaya Kurniawan	Indonesia
bronze medal	Surasit Thongdeang	Thailand

The men's 100 metre butterfly event at the 2025 SEA Games will take place on 13 December 2025 at the SAT Swimming Pool in Bangkok, Thailand.

== Schedule ==
All times are Indochina Standard Time (UTC+07:00)

Date	Time	Event
Saturday, 13 December 2025	9:07	Heats
Saturday, 13 December 2025	18:05	Final

== Records ==
Prior to this competition, the existing world, Asian, and Southeast Asian Games records were as follows.

World Record	Caeleb Dressel (USA)	49.45	Tokyo, Japan	31 July 2021
Asian Record	Joseph Schooling (SGP)	50.39	Rio de Janeiro, Brazil	12 August 2016
Games Record	Joseph Schooling (SGP)	51.38	Kuala Lumpur, Malaysia	23 August 2017

== Results ==
=== Heats ===
Rank	Heat	Lane	Swimmer	Nationality	Time	Notes
1	2	4	Quah Zheng Wen	Singapore	54.06	Q
2	2	3	Jonathan Tan	Singapore	54.18	Q
3	1	5	Surasit Thongdeang	Thailand	54.27	Q
4	1	3	Logan Wataru Noguchi	Philippines	54.62	Q
5	2	5	Joe Aditya Wijaya Kurniawan	Indonesia	54.68	Q
6	2	1	Jason Donovan Yusuf	Indonesia	54.87	Q
7	1	4	Bryan Leong Xin Ren	Malaysia	55.10	Q
8	2	2	Joran Paul Jamero Orogo	Philippines	57.08	Q
9	1	6	Dương Văn Hoàng Quy	Vietnam	57.16	R
10	2	6	Nguyễn Viết Tường	Vietnam	57.62	R
11	2	7	Thu Lin Myat	Myanmar	1:00.53	
12	1	2	Han Paing Htoo	Myanmar	1:05.48	
13	1	1	Ryuto Saysanavongphet	Laos	1:09.07	NR

=== Final ===
Rank	Lane	Swimmer	Nationality	Time	Notes
1st place, gold medalist(s)	4	Quah Zheng Wen	Singapore	52.25	
2nd place, silver medalist(s)	2	Joe Aditya Wijaya Kurniawan	Indonesia	53.14	
3rd place, bronze medalist(s)	3	Surasit Thongdeang	Thailand	53.32	
4	6	Logan Wataru Noguchi	Philippines	53.45	
5	1	Bryan Leong Xin Ren	Malaysia	53.86	
6	5	Jonathan Tan	Singapore	53.88	
7	7	Jason Donovan Yusuf	Indonesia	54.66	
8	8	Joran Paul Jamero Orogo	Philippines	56.21	
