= Swimming at the 2025 SEA Games – Women's 400 metre freestyle =

Women's 400 metre freestyle at the 2025 SEA Games
- Venue: SAT Swimming Pool
- Date: 12 December
- Competitors: 10 from 7 nations
- Winning time: 4:11.88

Medalists
gold medal	Gan Ching Hwee	Singapore
silver medal	Kamonchanok Kwanmuang	Thailand
bronze medal	Võ Thị Mỹ Tiên	Vietnam

The Women's 400 metre freestyle event at the 2025 SEA Games took place on 12 December 2025 at the SAT Swimming Pool in Bangkok, Thailand.

== Schedule ==
All times are Indochina Standard Time (UTC+07:00)

Date	Time	Event
Thursday, 12 December 2025	9:22	Heats
Thursday, 12 December 2025	19:22	Final

== Records ==
Prior to this competition, the existing world, Asian and Games records were as follows.

World Record	Summer McIntosh (CAN)	3:54.18	Victoria, Canada	7 June 2025
Asian Record	Li Bingjie (CHN)	3:58.21	Singapore, Singapore	27 July 2025
Games Record	Nguyễn Thị Ánh Viên (VIE)	4:08.66	Singapore, Singapore	10 June 2015

== Results ==
=== Heats ===
Rank	Heat	Lane	Swimmer	Nationality	Time	Notes
1	2	4	Gan Ching Hwee	Singapore	4:20.19	Q
2	2	5	Kamonchanok Kwanmuang	Thailand	4:25.31	Q
3	2	3	Maria Nedelko	Thailand	4:26.23	Q
4	1	4	Võ Thị Mỹ Tiên	Vietnam	4:28.03	Q
4	1	5	Nguyễn Khả Nhi	Vietnam	4:29.86	Q
6	1	3	Izzy Dwifaiva Hefrisyanthi	Indonesia	4:30.80	Q
7	2	2	Kyla Louise Bulaga	Philippines	4:38.93	Q
8	1	6	Tan Rui Nee	Malaysia	4:41.07	Q
9	2	6	Kelly Teo Yao	Malaysia	4:41.75	R
10	1	2	Kaylonie Amphonesuh	Laos	5:10.48	R, NR

=== Final ===
Rank	Lane	Swimmer	Nationality	Time	Notes
1st place, gold medalist(s)	4	Gan Ching Hwee	Singapore	4:11.88	
2nd place, silver medalist(s)	5	Kamonchanok Kwanmuang	Thailand	4:13.56	
3rd place, bronze medalist(s)	6	Võ Thị Mỹ Tiên	Vietnam	4:17.39	
4	2	Nguyễn Khả Nhi	Vietnam	4:19.89	
5	3	Maria Nedelko	Thailand	4:22.74	
6	7	Izzy Dwifaiva Hefrisyanthi	Indonesia	4:33.21	
7	8	Tan Rui Nee	Malaysia	4:34.26	
8	1	Kyla Louise Bulaga	Philippines	4:38.96	
