= List of Singaporean records in swimming =

The following lists the national swimming records for Singapore. They are the fastest times ever swum by a Singaporean in each long-course (50 m) event.

These records are kept/maintained by the country's national federation for swimming/aquatic sports: the Singapore Aquatics (SAQ).

== Long course (50 m) ==
=== Men ===
| Event | Time | | Name | Club | Date | Meet | Location | Ref |
|---|---|---|---|---|---|---|---|---|
| 50m freestyle | 21.91 | h | Jonathan Tan | Singapore | 7 May 2023 | Southeast Asian Games | Phnom Penh, Cambodia | |
| 100m freestyle | 48.27 | h | Joseph Schooling | Singapore | 9 August 2016 | Olympic Games | Rio de Janeiro, Brazil | |
| 200m freestyle | 1:47.79 | r | Joseph Schooling | Singapore | 7 June 2015 | Southeast Asian Games | Singapore, Singapore | |
| 400m freestyle | 3:52.64 | | Glen Lim | Swimfast Aquatic Club | 21 March 2019 | Singapore Age Group Championships | Singapore, Singapore | |
| 800m freestyle | 8:04.70 | | Russel Pang | Singapore | 14 April 2026 | Australian Age Championships | Gold Coast, Australia | |
| 1500m freestyle | 15:22.16 | | Russel Pang | Singapore | 22 September 2026 | Asian Games | Tokyo, Japan | |
| 50m backstroke | 24.97 | h | Tedd Chan | Singapore | 21 September 2026 | Asian Games | Tokyo, Japan | |
| 100m backstroke | 53.79 | | Quah Zheng Wen | Singapore | 4 December 2019 | Southeast Asian Games | New Clark City, Philippines | |
| 200m backstroke | 1:59.49 | h | Quah Zheng Wen | Singapore | 27 July 2017 | World Championships | Budapest, Hungary | |
| 50m breaststroke | 27.68 | | Chan Chun Ho | Singapore | 15 December 2025 | Southeast Asian Games | Bangkok, Thailand | |
| 100m breaststroke | 59.96 | | Nicholas Mahabir | Coronado Swim Association Team | 28 July 2023 (Note: by official result source; 29 July 2023 by SSA source) | TYR Pro Championships | Irvine, United States | |
| 200m breaststroke | 2:11.87 | h | Nicholas Mahabir | Coronado Swim Association Team | 29 July 2023 | TYR Pro Championships | Irvine, United States | |
| 50m butterfly | 22.93 | AS | Joseph Schooling | Singapore | 23 July 2017 | World Championships | Budapest, Hungary | |
| 100m butterfly | 50.39 | AS, CR | Joseph Schooling | Singapore | 12 August 2016 | Olympic Games | Rio de Janeiro, Brazil | |
| 200m butterfly | 1:55.73 | | Joseph Schooling | Singapore | 8 June 2015 | Southeast Asian Games | Singapore, Singapore | |
| 200m individual medley | 1:59.99 | h | Joseph Schooling | Singapore | 31 July 2013 | World Championships | Barcelona, Spain | |
| 400m individual medley | 4:21.70 | | Quah Zheng Wen | Swimfast Aquatic Club | 16 March 2012 | Singapore Age Group Championships | Singapore, Singapore | |
| 4×100m freestyle relay | 3:14.77 | | Jonathan Tan (49.13); Quah Zheng Wen (48.31); Ardi Azman (50.08); Mikkel Lee (47.25) | Singapore | 28 September 2023 | Asian Games | Hangzhou, China | |
| 4×200m freestyle relay | 7:14.15 | | Quah Zheng Wen (1:48.31); Joseph Schooling (1:46.66); Danny Yeo (1:49.23); Jonathan Tan (1:49.95) | Singapore | 20 August 2018 | Asian Games | Jakarta, Indonesia | |
| 4×100m medley relay | 3:37.45 | | Quah Zheng Wen (55.31); Nicholas Mahabir (1:00.68); Teong Tzen Wei (52.79); Jonathan Tan (48.67) | Singapore | 8 May 2023 | Southeast Asian Games | Phnom Penh, Cambodia | |

Legend: # – Record awaiting ratification by Singapore Swimming Association; WR – World record; AS – Asian record; CR – Commonwealth record; e – equalled existing record;
Records not set in finals: h – heat; sf – semifinal; r – relay 1st leg; rh – relay heat 1st leg; b – B final; † – en route to final mark; so – swim-off; tt – time trial

=== Women ===
| Event | Time | | Name | Club | Date | Meet | Location | Ref |
|---|---|---|---|---|---|---|---|---|
| 50m freestyle | 24.77 | | Amanda Lim | Tts Merlions | 30 May 2026 | Singapore Championships | Singapore, Singapore | |
| 100m freestyle | 54.62 | h | Quah Ting Wen | Swimfast Aquatic Club | 19 June 2019 | Singaporean Championships | Singapore, Singapore | |
| 200m freestyle | 1:59.10 | r | Gan Ching Hwee | Singapore | 14 December 2025 | Southeast Asian Games | Bangkok, Thailand | |
| 400m freestyle | 4:06.81 | | Gan Ching Hwee | Singapore | 22 September 2026 | Asian Games | Tokyo, Japan | |
| 800m freestyle | 8:29.56 (Note: by SAQ source; 8:26.25 by official result source) | | Gan Ching Hwee | Singapore | 25 September 2026 | Asian Games | Tokyo, Japan | |
| 1500m freestyle | 16:00.45 | | Gan Ching Hwee | Singapore | 20 September 2026 | Asian Games | Tokyo, Japan | |
| 50m backstroke | 28.58 | | Shana Lim | - | 18 March 2010 | Singapore Age Group Championships | Singapore, Singapore | |
| 100m backstroke | 1:01.60 | h | Tao Li | Singapore | 29 July 2012 | Olympic Games | London, United Kingdom | |
| 200m backstroke | 2:15.03 | | Julia Yeo | Swim Alliance | 19 March 2026 (Note: by official result source; 12 March 2026 by SAQ source, a typo) | Singapore Age Group Championships | Singapore, Singapore | |
| 50m breaststroke | 30.92 | h | Letitia Sim | Singapore | 1 December 2023 | Japan Open | Tokyo, Japan | |
| 100m breaststroke | 1:06.36 | | Letitia Sim | Singapore | 30 November 2023 | Japan Open | Tokyo, Japan | |
| 200m breaststroke | 2:24.15 (Note: by official result source; 2:24.00 by SSA source, a typo) | | Letitia Sim | Singapore | 6 October 2023 | World Cup | Berlin, Germany | |
| 50m butterfly | 26.10 | | Tao Li | Singapore | 18 Nov 2010 | Asian Games | Guangzhou, China | |
| 100m butterfly | 57.54 | sf | Tao Li | Singapore | 10 August 2008 | Olympic Games | Beijing, China | |
| 200m butterfly | 2:09.52 | | Quah Jing Wen | Singapore | 14 May 2022 | Southeast Asian Games | Hanoi, Vietnam | |
| 200m individual medley | 2:13.42 | | Letitia Sim | Singapore | 11 December 2025 | Southeast Asian Games | Bangkok, Thailand | |
| 400m individual medley | 4:46.06 | | Gan Ching Hwee | Singapore | 20 March 2026 | Singapore Age Group Championships | Singapore, Singapore | |
| 4×100m freestyle relay | 3:40.92 | | Quah Ting Wen (54.80); Quah Jing Wen (56.01); Cherlyn Yeoh (54.96); Amanda Lim (55.15) | Singapore | 7 December 2019 | Southeast Asian Games | New Clark City, Philippines | |
| 4×200m freestyle relay | 8:07.00 | | Gan Ching Hwee (2:02.30); Quah Ting Wen (2:00.69); Quah Jing Wen (2:02.15); Christie Chue (2:01.86) | Singapore | 5 December 2019 | Southeast Asian Games | New Clark City, Philippines | |
| 4×100m medley relay | 4:02.88 | h | Levenia Sim (1:02.58); Letitia Sim (1:06.41); Quah Jing Wen (58.89); Quah Ting Wen (55.00) | Singapore | 16 February 2024 | World Championships | Doha, Qatar | |

Legend: # – Record awaiting ratification by Singapore Swimming Association; WR – World record; AS – Asian record; e – equalled existing record;
Records not set in finals: h – heat; sf – semifinal; r – relay 1st leg; rh – relay heat 1st leg; b – B final; † – en route to final mark; so – swim-off; tt – time trial

=== Mixed relay ===
| Event | Time | Name | Club | Date | Meet | Location | Ref |
|---|---|---|---|---|---|---|---|
| 4×100m freestyle relay | 3:27.75 | Quah Zheng Wen (49.40); Darren Chua (49.32); Quah Ting Wen (54.52); Cherlyn Yeoh (54.51) | Singapore | 3 August 2019 | World Cup | Tokyo, Japan | |
| 4×100m medley relay | 3:49.73 | Quah Zheng Wen (55.26); Letitia Sim (1:06.47); Quah Jing Wen (59.60); Jonathan Tan (48.40) | Singapore | 27 September 2023 | Asian Games | Hangzhou, China | |

Legend: # – Record awaiting ratification by Singapore Swimming Association; WR – World record; AS – Asian record; e – equalled existing record;
Records not set in finals: h – heat; so – swim-off

== Short course (25 m) ==
=== Men ===
| Event | Time | | Name | Club | Date | Meet | Location | Ref |
|---|---|---|---|---|---|---|---|---|
| 50m freestyle | 21.09 | sf, = | Teong Tzen Wei | Singapore | 16 December 2022 | World Championships | Melbourne, Australia | |
| 50m freestyle | 21.09 | r, = | Teong Tzen Wei | Aqua Tech | 25 November 2023 | Singaporean Championships | Singapore, Singapore | |
| 100m freestyle | 46.90 | | Quah Zheng Wen | Swimfast Aquatic Club | 8 November 2025 | Singaporean Championships | Singapore, Singapore | |
| 200m freestyle | 1:45.49 | | Jerald Lium | Aquatic Masters Swimming Club | 22 November 2023 | Singaporean Championships | Singapore, Singapore | |
| 400m freestyle | 3:45.41 | | Glen Lim | AquaTech Swimming Club | 25 November 2021 | Singaporean Championships | Singapore, Singapore | |
| 800m freestyle | 7:54.40 | | Russel Pang | Singapore Swimming Club | 1 November 2026 | Singaporean Championships | Singapore, Singapore | |
| 1500m freestyle | 15:06.64 | | Glen Lim | AquaTech Swimming Club | 17 November 2019 | Singaporean Championships | Singapore, Singapore | |
| 50m backstroke | 23.45 | h | Quah Zheng Wen | Swimfast Aquatic Club | 24 November 2023 | Singaporean Championships | Singapore, Singapore | |
| 100m backstroke | 51.03 | | Quah Zheng Wen | Swimfast Aquatic Club | 8 November 2025 | Singaporean Championships | Singapore, Singapore | |
| 200m backstroke | 1:55.01 | | Julian Lee | Chinese Swimming Club | 30 August 2026 | Singapore National Invitational | Singapore, Singapore | |
| 50m breaststroke | 27.02 | h | Chan Chun Ho | Singapore | 18 October 2025 (Note: by official result source; 17 October by SAQ source, a typo) | World Cup | Westmont, United States | |
| 100m breaststroke | 58.10 | h | Maximillian Ang | Singapore | 14 December 2022 | World Championships | Melbourne, Australia | |
| 200m breaststroke | 2:07.92 | h | Chan Chun Ho | Singapore | 19 October 2025 | World Cup | Westmont, United States | |
| 50m butterfly | 21.93 | AS | Teong Tzen Wei | Singapore | 25 October 2025 | World Cup | Toronto, Canada | |
| 100m butterfly | 49.37 | | Teong Tzen Wei | Singapore | 31 October 2024 | World Cup | Singapore, Singapore | |
| 200m butterfly | 1:55.99 | h | Brandon Yap | Aquarian Aquatic School | 29 August 2026 | Singapore National Invitational | Singapore, Singapore | |
| 100m individual medley | 52.79 | | Quah Zheng Wen | Swimfast Aquatic Club | 25 November 2023 | Singaporean Championships | Singapore, Singapore | |
| 200m individual medley | 1:57.05 | | Reagan Cheng | Chinese Swimming Club | 1 November 2026 | Singaporean Championships | Singapore, Singapore | |
| 400m individual medley | 4:13.98 | h | Zackery Tay | Singapore | 14 December 2024 | World Championships | Budapest, Hungary | |
| 4×50m freestyle relay | 1:28.00 | | Teong Tzen Wei (21.09); Darren Lim (22.46); Jakob Gerber (22.41); Darren Chua (22.04) | Aqua Tech | 25 November 2023 | Singaporean Championships | Singapore, Singapore | |
| 4×100m freestyle relay | 3:19.62 | | Quah Zheng Wen; Mikkel Lee; Ardi Azman; Jonathan Tan | Singapore | 28 January 2023 | SEA Dual Meet Series | Jakarta, Indonesia | |
| 4×200m freestyle relay | 7:23.50 | h | Quah Zheng Wen (1:50.29); Pang Sheng Jun (1:51.24); Rainer Ng (1:51.54); Joseph Schooling (1:50.43) | Singapore | 13 December 2012 | World Championships | Istanbul, Turkey | |
| 4×50m medley relay | 1:39.29 | | Jakob Gerber (25.53); Taka Kin Rong Leong (28.79); Teong Tzen Wei (22.28); Darren Lim (22.69) | Aqua Tech | 23 November 2023 | Singaporean Championships | Singapore, Singapore | |
| 4×100m medley relay | 3:40.56 | h | Quah Zheng Wen (54.84); Lionel Khoo (1:01.46); Joseph Schooling (53.02); Rainer Ng (51.24) | Singapore | 16 December 2012 | World Championships | Istanbul, Turkey | |

Legend: # – Record awaiting ratification by Singapore Swimming Association; WR – World record; AS – Asian record; e – equalled existing record;
Records not set in finals: h – heat; sf – semifinal; r – relay 1st leg; rh – relay heat 1st leg; b – B final; † – en route to final mark; so – swim-off; tt – time trial

=== Women ===
| Event | Time | | Name | Club | Date | Meet | Location | Ref |
|---|---|---|---|---|---|---|---|---|
| 50m freestyle | 24.03 | | Quah Ting Wen | DC Trident | 5 November 2020 | International Swimming League | Budapest, Hungary | |
| 100m freestyle | 53.52 | | Quah Ting Wen | DC Trident | 17 November 2019 | International Swimming League | College Park, United States | |
| 200m freestyle | 1:56.85 | h | Gan Ching Hwee | Singapore | 15 December 2024 | World Championships | Budapest, Hungary | |
| 400m freestyle | 4:01.94 | | Gan Ching Hwee | Singapore | 1 October 2026 | World Cup | Baku, Azerbaijan | |
| 800m freestyle | 8:13.18 | | Gan Ching Hwee | Singapore | 17 October 2026 | World Cup | Astana, Kazakhstan | |
| 1500m freestyle | 15:38.41 | AS | Gan Ching Hwee | Singapore | 15 October 2026 | World Cup | Astana, Kazakhstan | |
| 50m backstroke | 26.89 | | Levenia Sim | Aqua Tech | 24 November 2023 | Singaporean Championships | Singapore, Singapore | |
| 100m backstroke | 58.80 | h | Levenia Sim | Aqua Tech | 22 November 2023 | Singaporean Championships | Singapore, Singapore | |
| 200m backstroke | 2:09.44 | | Levenia Sim | Aqua Tech | 23 November 2023 | Singaporean Championships | Singapore, Singapore | |
| 50m breaststroke | 30.38 | | Roanne Ho | Swimfast Aquatic Club | 2 December 2017 | Singaporean Championships | Singapore, Singapore | |
| 100m breaststroke | 1:05.44 | | Letitia Sim | Singapore | 4 November 2022 | World Cup | Indianapolis, United States | |
| 200m breaststroke | 2:21.60 | h | Letitia Sim | Singapore | 16 December 2022 | World Championships | Melbourne, Australia | |
| 50m butterfly | 25.35 | | Quah Ting Wen | DC Trident | 31 October 2020 | International Swimming League | Budapest, Hungary | |
| 100m butterfly | 56.28 | | Tao Li | Singapore | 15 November 2008 | World Cup | Berlin, Germany | |
| 200m butterfly | 2:07.32 | | Quah Jing Wen | Swimfast Aquatic Club | 28 November 2021 | Singaporean Championships | Singapore, Singapore | |
| 100m individual medley | 59.82 | h | Letitia Sim | Singapore | 10 October 2025 | World Cup | Carmel, United States | |
| 200m individual medley | 2:09.82 | h | Letitia Sim | Singapore | 13 December 2022 | World Championships | Melbourne, Australia | |
| 400m individual medley | 4:39.42 | | Gan Ching Hwee | Singapore | 2 October 2026 | World Cup | Baku, Azerbaijan | |
| 4×50m freestyle relay | 1:43.20 | h | Amanda Lim (25.66); Marina Chan (25.26); En Qi Hoong (26.14); Roanne Ho (26.14) | Singapore | 11 December 2016 | World Championships | Windsor, Canada | |
| 4×100m freestyle relay | 3:50.57 | h | Mylene Ong (56.16); Amanda Lim (57.72); Lynette Ng (58.27); Samantha Yeo (58.42) | Singapore | 15 December 2012 | World Championships | Istanbul, Turkey | |
| 4×200m freestyle relay | | | | | | | | |
| 4×50m medley relay | 1:55.25 | h | En Qi Hoong (30.00); Roanne Ho (32.07); Marina Chan (27.09); Amanda Lim (26.09) | Singapore | 7 December 2016 | World Championships | Windsor, Canada | |
| 4×100m medley relay | 4:12.35 | h | En Qi Hoong (1:05.22); Samantha Yeo (1:08.60); Marina Chan (1:02.05); Amanda Lim (56.48) | Singapore | 11 December 2016 | World Championships | Windsor, Canada | |

Legend: # – Record awaiting ratification by Singapore Swimming Association; WR – World record; AS – Asian record; e – equalled existing record;
Records not set in finals: h – heat; sf – semifinal; r – relay 1st leg; rh – relay heat 1st leg; b – B final; † – en route to final mark; so – swim-off; tt – time trial

=== Mixed relay ===
| Event | Time | Name | Club | Date | Meet | Location | Ref |
|---|---|---|---|---|---|---|---|
| 4×50 m freestyle relay | 1:33.14 | Teong Tzen Wei (21.56); Jonathan Tan (21.76); Amanda Lim (24.76); Marina Chan (25.06) | Singapore | 16 November 2018 | World Cup | Singapore, Singapore | |
| 4×50 m medley relay | 1:42.21 | Joseph Schooling (24.08); Roanne Ho (30.62); Teong Tzen Wei (22.73); Amanda Lim (24.78) | Singapore | 17 November 2018 | World Cup | Singapore, Singapore | |

Legend: # – Record awaiting ratification by Singapore Swimming Association; e – equalled existing record;
Records not set in finals: h – heat; so – swim-off
