= Swimming at the 2017 SEA Games – Men's 50 metre freestyle =

Swimming – Men's 50 metre freestyle at the 2017 SEA Games
- Venue: National Aquatic Centre
- Date: 25 August 2017
- Competitors: 14 from 8 nations
- Winning time: 22.55

Medalists
gold medal	Teong Tzen Wei	Singapore
silver medal	Triady Fauzi Sidiq	Indonesia
bronze medal	Lê Nguyễn Paul	Vietnam

The men's 50 metre freestyle competition of the swimming event at the 2017 SEA Games was held on 25 August at the National Aquatic Centre in Kuala Lumpur, Malaysia.

== Records ==
Prior to this competition, the existing Asian and Games records were as follows:

Asian Record	Shioura Shinri (JPN)	21.88	Tokyo, Japan	13 April 2014
Games Record	Joseph Schooling (SGP)	22.47	Singapore, Singapore	8 June 2015

== Schedule ==
All times are Malaysia Standard Time (UTC+08:00)

Date	Time	Event
Friday, 25 August 2017	09:20	Heat 1
Friday, 25 August 2017	09:20	Heat 2
Friday, 25 August 2017	19:15	Final

== Results ==
=== Heats ===
The heats were held on 25 August.

==== Heat 1 ====
Source: Heat 1 results

Rank	Lane	Athletes	Time	Notes
1	1	Lê Nguyễn Paul (VIE)	23.31	Q
2	3	Keith Lim (MAS)	23.34	Q
3	4	Darren Lim (SGP)	23.41	Q
4	6	Kitiphat Pipimnan (THA)	23.74	Q
5	5	Raymond Sumitra Lukman (INA)	23.78	
6	7	Slava Sihanouovong (LAO)	26.36	
7	2	Thiha Aung (MYA)	26.49	

==== Heat 2 ====
Source: Heat 2 results

Rank	Lane	Athletes	Time	Notes
1	5	Triady Fauzi Sidiq (INA)	22.73	Q
2	4	Teong Tzen Wei (SGP)	23.04	Q
3	1	Hoàng Quý Phước (VIE)	23.38	Q
4	3	Supakrid Pananuratana (THA)	23.41	Q
5	6	Chan Jie (MAS)	23.89	
6	2	Thol Thoeun (CAM)	25.81	
7	7	Cheng Pirort (CAM)	26.19	

=== Final ===
Source: Final Results

The final was held on 25 August.

Rank	Lane	Athletes	Time	Notes
1st place, gold medalist(s)	5	Teong Tzen Wei (SGP)	22.55	
2nd place, silver medalist(s)	4	Triady Fauzi Sidiq (INA)	22.66	NR
3rd place, bronze medalist(s)	3	Lê Nguyễn Paul (VIE)	22.90	NR
4	7	Darren Lim (SGP)	23.07	
5	1	Supakrid Pananuratana (THA)	23.16	
6	2	Hoàng Quý Phước (VIE)	23.26	
7	6	Keith Lim (MAS)	23.34	
8	8	Kitiphat Pipimnan (THA)	23.61	
