= Phee Jinq En =

Malaysian professional swimmer (born 1997)

Personal information
- Full name: Phee Jinq En (彭靖恩)
- National team: Malaysia
- Born: 29 November 1997 (age 28) Subang Jaya, Selangor, Malaysia

Sport
- Sport: Swimming
- Strokes: Breaststroke
- College team: Purdue University
Medal record
Representing Malaysia
Southeast Asian Games
Gold medal – first place	2015 Singapore	100 m breaststroke
Gold medal – first place	2017 Kuala Lumpur	100 m breaststroke
Gold medal – first place	2019 Philippines	50 m breaststroke
Gold medal – first place	2019 Philippines	100 m breaststroke
Silver medal – second place	2015 Singapore	50 m breaststroke
Silver medal – second place	2017 Kuala Lumpur	50 m breaststroke
Silver medal – second place	2025 Thailand	100 m breaststroke
Bronze medal – third place	2019 Philippines	200 m breaststroke
Bronze medal – third place	2023 Cambodia	50 m breaststroke
Bronze medal – third place	2025 Thailand	50 m breaststroke

Phee Jinq En

Chinese name
- Traditional Chinese: 彭靖恩
- Simplified Chinese: 彭靖恩
Transcriptions
Standard Mandarin
- Hanyu Pinyin: Péng Jìng'ēn
Yue: Cantonese
- Jyutping: Paang4 Zing6 Jan1
Southern Min
- Hokkien POJ: Phêⁿ Chēng-un

Phee Jinq En (born 29 November 1997) is a former Malaysian professional swimmer. She competed at the 2016 Summer Olympics in the women's 100 metre breaststroke; her time of 1:10.22 in the heats did not qualify her for the semifinals. She also completed at the 2020 Summer Olympics in the women's 100 metre breaststroke and women's 200 metre breaststroke, capture a time of 1:08.40 (rank: 29) and 2:32.57 (rank: 31) respectively. Phee is also a current Malaysian swimming national record holder in both women's 50m and 100m breaststroke. Phee currently swims under the DSA Swimming Club for Swim Meets and Championships. DSA Swimming Club is one of the top swimming clubs in Malaysia.
