= Tug of war at the 2025 SEA Games =

- Venue: Multipurpose Venue, Sports Authority of Thailand Bangkok
- Dates: 16 December 2025

The tug of war competition at the 2025 SEA Games took place in 16 December 2025 at the Multipurpose Venue, Sports Authority of Thailand in Bangkok, Thailand. It appeared for the first time as a demonstration sport.

== Participating nations ==
- Indonesia
- Laos
- Malaysia
- Myanmar
- Singapore
- Thailand
- Vietnam

== Medalists ==
The tug of war competition were consisted of five events.

Event	Gold	Silver	Bronze
Men's outdoor 300 kg	Thailand	Vietnam	Myanmar
Men's outdoor 600 kg	Thailand	Vietnam	Malaysia
Men's outdoor 600 kg	Thailand	Vietnam	Singapore
Women's outdoor 250 kg	Malaysia	Thailand	Vietnam
Women's outdoor 500 kg	Thailand	Vietnam	Laos
Women's outdoor 500 kg	Thailand	Vietnam	Malaysia
Mixed outdoor 560 kg	Vietnam	Thailand	Singapore
