= Swimming at the 2015 SEA Games – Women's 100 metre breaststroke =

Swimming – Women's 100 metre breaststroke at the 2015 SEA Games
- Venue: OCBC Aquatic Centre
- Date: 8 June 2015
- Competitors: 9 from 5 nations

Medalists
gold medal	Phee Jinq En	Malaysia
silver medal	Ho Ru'En Roanne	Singapore
bronze medal	Samantha Louisa Ginn Yeo	Singapore

The women's 100 metre breaststroke competition of the swimming event at the 2015 SEA Games was held on 8 June at the OCBC Aquatic Centre in Kallang, Singapore.

== Records ==
Prior to this competition, the existing Asian and Games records were as follows:

Asian Record	Ji Liping (CHN)	1:05.32	Beijing, China	29 August 2009
Games Record	Siow Yi Ting (MAS)	1:09.82	Vientiane, Laos	11 December 2009

== Schedule ==
All times are Singapore Standard Time (UTC+08:00)

Date	Time	Event
Monday, 8 June 2015	09:09	Heat 1
Monday, 8 June 2015	09:10	Heat 2
Monday, 8 June 2015	19:48	Final

== Results ==
KEY:	Q	Qualified	GR	Games record	NR	National record	PB	Personal best	SB	Seasonal best	WD	Withdrew	DNF	Did not finish

=== Heats ===
Source: Heats Results Summary

The heats were held on 8 June.

==== Heat 1 ====
Source: Heat 1 Results

Heat 1 was held on 8 June.

Rank	Lane	Athletes	Time	Notes
1	4	Phee Jinq En (MAS)	1:11.91	Q
2	5	Phiangkhwan Pawapotako (THA)	1:12.20	Q
3	3	Chavunnooch Salubluek (THA)	1:12.70	Q
4	6	Raissa Regatta Gavino (PHI)	1:15.08	

==== Heat 2 ====
Source: Heat 2 Results

Heat 2 was held on 8 June.

Rank	Lane	Athletes	Time	Notes
1	6	Ho Ru'En Roanne (SIN)	1:12.47	Q
2	5	Imelda Corazon Wistey (PHI)	1:13.06	Q
3	2	Ananda Treciel V. Evato (INA)	1:13.07	Q
4	4	Christina Loh Yen Ling (MAS)	1:13.32	Q
5	3	Samantha Louisa Ginn Yeo (SIN)	1:13.79	Q

=== Final ===
Source: Final Results

The final was held on 8 June.

Rank	Lane	Athletes	Time	Notes
1st place, gold medalist(s)	4	Phee Jinq En (MAS)	1:10.47	
2nd place, silver medalist(s)	3	Ho Ru'En Roanne (SIN)	1:11.78	
3rd place, bronze medalist(s)	8	Samantha Louisa Ginn Yeo (SIN)	1:11.87	
4	5	Phiangkhwan Pawapotako (THA)	1:11.93	
5	1	Christina Loh Yen Ling (MAS)	1:12.16	
6	7	Ananda Treciel V. Evato (INA)	1:12.70	
7	6	Chavunnooch Salubluek (THA)	1:13.33	
8	2	Imelda Corazon Wistey (PHI)	1:13.69	
