= Teong Tzen Wei =

Singaporean swimmer (born 1997)

Teong Tzen Wei 张正伟
Personal information
- National team: Singapore
- Born: 17 October 1997 (age 29) Singapore
- Height: 1.75 m (5 ft 9 in)
- Weight: 70 kg (154 lb)

Sport
- Sport: Swimming
- Strokes: Butterfly, freestyle, medley
- Coach: Gary Tan
Medal record
Men's swimming
Representing Singapore
Event	1st	2nd	3rd
Commonwealth Games	0	1	0
FINA Swimming World Cup	0	2	0
Southeast Asian Games	6	5	0
Total	6	8	0
Commonwealth Games
Silver medal – second place	2022 Birmingham	50 m butterfly
FINA Swimming World Cup
Silver medal – second place	2018 Singapore	Mixed 4 x 50 m freestyle
Silver medal – second place	2018 Singapore	Mixed 4 x 50 m medley
Asian Games
Silver medal – second place	2022 Hangzhou	50 m butterfly
Southeast Asian Games
Gold medal – first place	2017 Kuala Lumpur	50 m freestyle
Gold medal – first place	2019 Philippines	50 m butterfly
Gold medal – first place	2021 Vietnam	50 m freestyle
Gold medal – first place	2021 Vietnam	50 m butterfly
Gold medal – first place	2023 Cambodia	4×100 m medley
Gold medal – first place	2025 Thailand	50 m butterfly
Silver medal – second place	2019 Philippines	50 m freestyle
Silver medal – second place	2023 Cambodia	50 m butterfly
Silver medal – second place	2023 Cambodia	100 m butterfly
Silver medal – second place	2023 Cambodia	50 m freestyle
Silver medal – second place	2025 Thailand	50 m freestyle

Teong Tzen Wei (Chinese: 张正伟, born 17 October 1997) is a Singaporean swimmer. He won the silver medal at the 2022 Commonwealth Games in the 50 m butterfly, becoming the third Singaporean athlete to win a swimming medal at the Commonwealth Games.

== Career ==
=== 2017: First Southeast Asian gold ===
At the 2017 Southeast Asian Games, Teong clocked 22.55s in the final of the 50m freestyle, winning his first Southeast Asian Games gold.

=== 2018: FINA Swimming World Cup silver ===
Teong clinched 2 silvers in the mixed 4 x 50 medley and the mixed 4 x 50 freestyle relays at the last part of the FINA Swimming World Cup which was held in Singapore. In the mixed 4 x 50 freestyle, Singapore finished 2nd with a timing of 1.33.14, and in the mixed 4 x 50 medley, Singapore finished 2nd with a timing of 1.42.21.

=== 2019: 2nd Southeast Asian Games gold ===
Teong won his second gold at the 2019 SEA Games, winning in the 50 m butterfly, defeating compatriot Joseph Schooling in the final with a timing of 23.55s, by six one hundredths of a second. Teong then lost in the 50 m freestyle event, clinching silver with a time of 22.40s. He was defeated by his compatriot Jonathan Tan, who clinched the games record of 22.25s.

=== 2022: Two Southeast Asian Games golds and Commonwealth silver ===
In May 2022, Teong took part in the 2021 Southeast Asian Games, which had been pushed back 1 year due to the pandemic. In the 50 m freestyle, Teong clinched the gold medal in a time of 21.93s, setting a new Games Record and Singaporean record, breaking Jonathan Tan's records of 22.25s and 22.12s respectively. In doing so, he became the first Southeast Asian man to go under 22 seconds in the 50 m freestyle. In the 50 m butterfly final, Teong clocked a timing of 23.04s, setting a new Games Record, winning his 4th gold at the Southeast Asian Games.

At the 2022 World Championships, Teong made it to the final of the 50 m butterfly. He was the only Asian in the final. He clocked a timing of 23.29s, finishing 8th overall.

One month later, in late July, Teong made it to the finals of the 50 m butterfly at the 2022 Commonwealth Games. He clinched a silver in the final, clocking a time of 23.21s, losing to 2014 champion Ben Proud who won in a time of 22.81s.

In December, at the Short-Course World Championships, Teong made it to the final of the 50 m butterfly. He set the Asian record in the heats and repeated his time again in the finals, clocking 22.01s. He finished 4th in the final, missing out on a medal. Teong also swam the 50m freestyle, finishing 11th in the semi-final. He clocked 21.09s which is a national record & personal best.

== Personal life ==
In September 2022, Teong publicly admitted to consuming "controlled drugs" while he was overseas. He was given a one-month long suspension from Sports Singapore, and had his spexScholarship support withdrawn for one month, both starting from October 1.
