= Swimming at the 2021 SEA Games =

- Venue: Mỹ Đình Aquatics Center
- Location: Hanoi, Vietnam
- Date: 14–19 May 2022
- Nations: 11

The swimming competitions at the 2021 SEA Games took place at Mỹ Đình Aquatics Center in Hanoi, Vietnam from 14 to 19 May 2022. It is one of four aquatic sports at the Games, along with diving, finswimming and canoeing.

== Summary ==
Singapore dominated the swimming events again, winning just over half of the gold medals at 21 out of 40, in addition to 11 and 12 silver and bronze medals respectively. In total, Singapore won 44 medals.

Host Vietnam came in second with a total of 25 medals at 11 gold medals, 11 silver medals and three bronze medals.

During the 4 × 100 m men freestyle relay event, both Singapore and Malaysia teams were disqualified by officials on technicalities shortly after winning gold and silver respectively. The Philippines team was also disqualified. Malaysia team coach Chris Martin said one of the Malaysian swimmers had entered the pool 0.12 s early during a changeover at the block. A Singapore swimmer was also reportedly left his block early. As a result, Vietnam, Indonesia and Thailand were awarded the gold, silver and bronze medals respectively.

A total of 10 SEA games records and 13 national records were broken.

== Participating nations ==
- Cambodia
- Indonesia
- Laos
- Malaysia
- Myanmar
- Philippines
- Singapore
- Thailand
- Timor-Leste
- Vietnam

== Medal table ==
* Host nation (Vietnam)

Rank	Nation	Gold	Silver	Bronze	Total
1	Singapore	21	11	12	44
2	Vietnam*	11	11	3	25
3	Thailand	4	9	9	22
4	Indonesia	2	3	10	15
5	Malaysia	1	4	2	7
6	Philippines	1	3	3	7
Totals (6 entries)		40	41	39	120

== Medalists ==
Key
AS	Asian record	GR	SEA Games record	NR	National record

=== Men ===
Event	Gold		Silver		Bronze	
50 m freestyle	Teong Tzen Wei; Singapore	21.93; GR, NR	Jonathan Tan; Singapore	22.24	Luong Jérémie Loïc Nino; Vietnam	22.85; NR
100 m freestyle	Quah Zheng Wen; Singapore	49.57	Jonathan Tan; Singapore	50.14	shared silver	
100 m freestyle	Quah Zheng Wen; Singapore	49.57	Luong Jérémie Loïc Nino; Vietnam	50.14	shared silver	
200 m freestyle	Khiew Hoe Yean; Malaysia	1:47.81	Quah Zheng Wen; Singapore	1:47.85	Hoàng Quý Phước; Vietnam	1:49.35
400 m freestyle	Nguyễn Huy Hoàng; Vietnam	3:48.06; GR, NR	Khiew Hoe Yean; Malaysia	3:52.03	Glen Lim Jun Wei; Singapore	3:56.68
800 m freestyle	Nguyễn Huy Hoàng; Vietnam	7:57.65 GR	Nguyễn Hữu Kim Sơn; Vietnam	8:04.23	Khiew Hoe Yean; Malaysia	8:06.71
1500 m freestyle	Nguyễn Huy Hoàng; Vietnam	15:00.75	Nguyễn Hữu Kim Sơn; Vietnam	15:27.31	Tonnam Kanteemool; Thailand	15:33.54
50 m backstroke	Quah Zheng Wen; Singapore	25.83	Paul Lê Nguyễn; Vietnam	25.86	I Gede Siman Sudartawa; Indonesia	25.88
100 m backstroke	Quah Zheng Wen; Singapore	54.83	Paul Lê Nguyễn; Vietnam	56.08	Farrel Armandio Tangkas; Indonesia	56.21
200 m backstroke	Trần Hưng Nguyên; Vietnam	2:01.58 NR	Khiew Hoe Yean; Malaysia	2:01.67	Farrel Armandio Tangkas; Indonesia	2:01.80
50 m breaststroke	Phạm Thanh Bảo; Vietnam	28.28 NR	Gagarin Nathaniel Yus; Indonesia	28.31	Maximillian Ang Wei; Singapore	28.32
100 m breaststroke	Phạm Thanh Bảo; Vietnam	1:01.17; GR, NR	Maximillian Ang Wei; Singapore	1:01.58; NR	Gagarin Nathaniel Yus; Indonesia	1:02.74
200 m breaststroke	Maximillian Ang Wei; Singapore	2:11.93; GR, NR	Phạm Thanh Bảo; Vietnam	2:12.09	Job Xi Jay Tan; Malaysia	2:17.68
50 m butterfly	Teong Tzen Wei; Singapore	23.04; GR	Mikkel Lee; Singapore	23.67	Glenn Victor Sutanto; Indonesia	24.30
100 m butterfly	Joseph Schooling; Singapore	52.22	Quah Zheng Wen; Singapore	52.86	Navaphat Wongcharoen; Thailand	52.98 NR
200 m butterfly	Nguyễn Huy Hoàng; Vietnam	1:58.81 NR	Navaphat Wongcharoen; Thailand	1:58.93 NR	Ong Jung Yi; Singapore	1:59.33
200 m individual medley	Trần Hưng Nguyên; Vietnam	2:01.22 NR	Dulyawat Kaewsriyong; Thailand	2:02.89 NR	Maximillian Ang Wei; Singapore	2:03.73
400 m individual medley	Trần Hưng Nguyên; Vietnam	4:18.10 GR, NR	Nguyễn Quang Thuấn; Vietnam	4:22.46	Aflah Fadlan Prawira; Indonesia	4:23.43
4 × 100 m freestyle relay (Note: Singapore and Malaysia initially finished the race in first and second position, winning the gold and silver medals respectively. Both teams were disqualified due to technicalities after it had ended, resulting in Vietnam, Indonesia and Thailand being awarded gold, silver and bronze medals respectively.)	Vietnam: Luong Jérémie Loïc Nino; Paul Lê Nguyễn; Hoàng Quý Phước; Ngô Đình Chuyền	3:21.81 NR	Indonesia: Glenn Victor Sutanto; Erick Ahmad Fathoni; Aflah Fadlan Prawira; Joe Aditya Kurniawan	3:24.09	Thailand: Tonnam Kanteemool; Dulyawat Kaewsriyong; Supha Sangaworawong; Navaphat Wongcharoen	3:24.28 NR
4×200 m freestyle relay	Vietnam: Nguyễn Huy Hoàng; Trần Hưng Nguyên; Hoàng Quý Phước; Nguyễn Hữu Kim Sơn	7:16.31 GR	Malaysia: Yin Chuen Lim; Welson Sim Wee Sheng; Khiew Hoe Yean; Arvin Shaun Singh Chahal	7:19.75; NR	Singapore: Jonathan Tan; Glen Lim Jun Wei; Joseph Schooling; Quah Zheng Wen	7:21.49
4×100 m medley relay	Singapore: Quah Zheng Wen; Maximillian Ang Wei; Joseph Schooling; Jonathan Tan	3:37.69	Vietnam: Paul Lê Nguyễn; Phạm Thanh Bảo; Hoàng Quý Phước; Luong Jérémie Loïc Nino	3:39.76 NR	Thailand: Tonnam Kanteemool; Dulyawat Kaewsriyong; Prasobchai Kaewrungrueang; Navaphat Wongcharoen	3:43.67 NR

=== Women ===
Event	Gold		Silver		Bronze	
50 m freestyle	Jenjira Srisaard; Thailand	25.12 NR	Amanda Lim; Singapore	25.39	Quah Ting Wen; Singapore	25.49
100 m freestyle	Quah Ting Wen; Singapore	55.60	Jenjira Srisaard; Thailand	56.62	Miranda Cristina Renner; Philippines	56.95
200 m freestyle	Gan Ching Hwee; Singapore	2:02.06	Kamonchanok Kwanmuang; Thailand	2:02.63	Chan Zi Yi; Singapore	2:03.21
400 m freestyle	Gan Ching Hwee; Singapore	4:14.16	Kamonchanok Kwanmuang; Thailand	4:17.13	Võ Thị Mỹ Tiên; Vietnam	4:17.52
800 m freestyle	Gan Ching Hwee; Singapore	8:42.60	Võ Thị Mỹ Tiên; Vietnam	8:51.73	Ashley Yi Xuan Lim; Singapore	8:58.98
1500 m freestyle	Gan Ching Hwee; Singapore	16:36.73 GR	Võ Thị Mỹ Tiên; Vietnam	16:55.88	Yarinda Sunthornrangsri; Thailand	17:07.45
50 m backstroke	Masniari Wolf; Indonesia	29.21 NR	Jessica Joy Geriane; Philippines	29.35; NR	Anak Agung Istri Kania Ratih; Indonesia	29.59
100 m backstroke	Flairene Candrea; Indonesia	1:03.36 NR	Chloe Isleta; Philippines	1:03.78	Jessica Joy Geriane; Philippines	1:03.86
200 m backstroke	Chloe Isleta; Philippines	2:18.60	Nurul Fajar Fitriyati; Indonesia	2:19.79	Mia Millar; Thailand	2:19.90
50 m breaststroke	Letitia Sim; Singapore	31.43	Jenjira Srisaard; Thailand	31.63	Christie Chue; Singapore	32.10
100 m breaststroke	Letitia Sim; Singapore	1:08.79	Jinq En Phee; Malaysia	1:09.60	Christie Chue; Singapore	1:10.29
200 m breaststroke	Phiangkhwan Pawapotako; Thailand	2:30.24	Christie Chue; Singapore	2:31.89	Letitia Sim; Singapore	2:31.97
50 m butterfly	Jenjira Srisaard; Thailand	26.53	Quah Ting Wen; Singapore	26.88	Quah Jing Wen; Singapore	26.98
100 m butterfly	Quah Jing Wen; Singapore	59.15	Quah Ting Wen; Singapore	59.34	Jasmine Alkhaldi; Philippines	1:01.15
200 m butterfly	Quah Jing Wen; Singapore	2:09.52; GR NR	Lê Thị Mỹ Thảo; Vietnam	2:14.20	Kamonchanok Kwanmuang; Thailand	2:14.35
200 m individual medley	Quah Jing Wen; Singapore	2:15.98	Letitia Sim; Singapore	2:16.61	Jingutha Pholjamjumrus; Thailand	2:16.75
400 m individual medley	Kamonchanok Kwanmuang; Thailand	4:49.98	Jingutha Pholjamjumrus; Thailand	4:52.32	Azzahra Permatahani; Indonesia	4:56.42
4 × 100 m freestyle relay	Singapore: Amanda Lim; Christie Chue; Quah Jing Wen; Quah Ting Wen	3:45.71	Thailand: Jenjira Srisaard; Natthanan Junkrajang; Manita Sathianchokwisan; Jinjutha Pholjamjumrus	3:48.63	Indonesia: Patricia Yosita Hapsari; Angel Gabriella Yus; Nurul Fajar Fitriyati; Ressa Kania Dewi	3:51.57
4×200 m freestyle relay	Singapore: Gan Ching Hwee; Christie Chue; Quah Jing Wen; Quah Ting Wen	8:10.75	Thailand: Jinjutha Pholjamjumrus; Kamonchanok Kwanmuang; Natthanan Junkrajang; Kornkarnjana Sapianchai	8:18.67	Indonesia: Patricia Yosita Hapsari; Angel Gabriella Yus; Ressa Kania Dewi; Azzahra Permatahani	8:26.24
4 × 100 m medley relay	Singapore: Bonnie Yeo; Letitia Sim; Quah Jing Wen; Quah Ting Wen	4:07.62	Philippines: Miranda Cristina Renner; Jasmine Alkhaldi; Chloe Isleta; Desirae Aubrey Mangaoang	4:12.36	Thailand: Mia Millar; Jenjira Srisaard; Jingutha Pholjamjumrus; Phiangkhwan Pawapotako	4:15.33
