= List of Vietnamese records in swimming =

The Vietnamese records in swimming are the fastest ever performances of swimmers from Vietnam, which are recognised and ratified by the Vietnam Aquatic Sports Association (Vietnamese: Hiệp hội thể thao dưới nước Việt Nam), abbreviation VASA.

All records were set in finals unless noted otherwise.

== Long Course (50 m) ==
=== Men ===
Event	Time		Name	Club	Date	Meet	Location	Ref
50 m freestyle	22.68		Jérémie Loïc Nino Luong	Ho Chi Minh City	13 December 2022	9th National Games	Hanoi, Vietnam	
100 m freestyle	49.03	b	Hoàng Quý Phước	-	21 April 2017	Hungarian Championships	Debrecen, Hungary	
200 m freestyle	1:48.07		Hoàng Quý Phước	Vietnam	23 August 2017	Southeast Asian Games	Kuala Lumpur, Malaysia	
400 m freestyle	3:48.06		Nguyễn Huy Hoàng	Vietnam	16 May 2022	Southeast Asian Games	Hanoi, Vietnam	
800 m freestyle	7:50.20		Nguyễn Huy Hoàng	Vietnam	11 October 2018	Youth Olympic Games	Buenos Aires, Argentina	
1500 m freestyle	14:58.14		Nguyễn Huy Hoàng	Vietnam	5 December 2019	Southeast Asian Games	New Clark City, Philippines	
50 m backstroke	25.50	h, =	Paul Lê Nguyễn	Vietnam	19 November 2016	Asian Championships	Tokyo, Japan	
50 m backstroke	25.50	=	Paul Lê Nguyễn	Vietnam	19 November 2016	Asian Championships	Tokyo, Japan	
100 m backstroke	54.98		Paul Lê Nguyễn	Vietnam	4 December 2019	Southeast Asian Games	New Clark City, Philippines	
200 m backstroke	2:01.34		Trần Hưng Nguyên	Vietnam	10 May 2023	Southeast Asian Games	Phnom Penh, Cambodia	
50m breaststroke	27.70	h	Phạm Thanh Bảo	Ben Tre	10 October 2024	Vietnamese Championships	Da Nang, Vietnam	
100m breaststroke	1:00.85	h	Phạm Thanh Bảo	Vietnam	21 September 2026	Asian Games	Tokyo, Japan	
200m breaststroke	2:11.45		Phạm Thanh Bảo	Vietnam	10 May 2023	Southeast Asian Games	Phnom Penh, Cambodia	
50m butterfly	23.97		Nguyễn Hoàng Khang	Vinh Long	15 October 2023	Vietnamese Championships	Ho Chi Minh City, Vietnam	
100m butterfly	53.07		Hoàng Quý Phước	Vietnam	13 November 2011	Southeast Asian Games	Palembang, Indonesia	
200m butterfly	1:58.81		Nguyễn Huy Hoàng	Vietnam	19 May 2022	Southeast Asian Games	Hanoi, Vietnam	
200m individual medley	2:01.22		Trần Hưng Nguyên	Vietnam	18 May 2022	Southeast Asian Games	Hanoi, Vietnam	
400m individual medley	4:17.57		Trần Hưng Nguyên	Vietnam	22 September 2026	Asian Games	Tokyo, Japan	
4×100m freestyle relay	3:20.01		Hung Nguyen Tran (50.60); Jérémie Loïc Nino Luong (49.42); Viet Tuong Nguyen (50.29); Van Nguyen Quoc Tran (49.70)	Vietnam	14 December 2025	Southeast Asian Games	Bangkok, Thailand	
4×200m freestyle relay	7:16.31		Nguyễn Hữu Kim Sơn (1:50.19); Nguyễn Huy Hoàng (1:48.42); Hoàng Quý Phước (1:48.66); Trần Hưng Nguyên (1:49.04)	Vietnam	17 May 2022	Southeast Asian Games	Hanoi, Vietnam	
4×100m medley relay	3:39.76		Paul Lê Nguyễn (55.47); Phạm Thành Bảo (1:00.80); Hoàng Quý Phước (53.74); Luong Jérémie Loïc Nino (49.75)	Vietnam	16 May 2022	Southeast Asian Games	Hanoi, Vietnam	

Legend: # – Record awaiting ratification by Vietnam Aquatic Sports Association; WR – World record; AS – Asian record; e – equalled existing record;
Records not set in finals: h – heat; sf – semifinal; r – relay 1st leg; rh – relay heat 1st leg; b – B final; † – en route to final mark; so – swim-off; tt – time trial

=== Women ===
Event	Time		Name	Club	Date	Meet	Location	Ref
50 m freestyle	25.70		Nguyễn Thúy Hiền	Vietnam	14 December 2025	Southeast Asian Games	Bangkok, Thailand	
100 m freestyle	55.76		Nguyễn Thị Ánh Viên	Vietnam	23 August 2017	Southeast Asian Games	Kuala Lumpur, Malaysia	
200 m freestyle	1:58.82		Nguyễn Thị Ánh Viên	-	3 June 2016	Arena Pro Swim Series	Indianapolis, United States	
400 m freestyle	4:07.96		Nguyễn Thị Ánh Viên	-	4 June 2016	Arena Pro Swim Series	Indianapolis, United States	
800 m freestyle	8:34.85		Nguyễn Thị Ánh Viên	People's Army of Vietnam	6 June 2015	Southeast Asian Games	Singapore, Singapore	
1500 m freestyle	16:28.18		Nguyễn Thị Ánh Viên	St. Augustine	4 May 2017	Arena Pro Swim Series	Atlanta, United States	
50m backstroke	29.26	=	Nguyễn Thị Ánh Viên	People's Army of Vietnam	12 December 2013	Asian Youth Games	Nanjing, China	
50m backstroke	29.26	=	Nguyễn Thị Ánh Viên	Vietnam	25 August 2017	Southeast Asian Games	Kuala Lumpur, Malaysia	
100m backstroke	1:01.89		Nguyễn Thị Ánh Viên	Vietnam	21 August 2017	Southeast Asian Games	Kuala Lumpur, Malaysia	
200m backstroke	2:12.25		Nguyễn Thị Ánh Viên	People's Army of Vietnam	26 September 2014	Asian Games	Incheon, South Korea	
50m breaststroke	31.95		Nguyễn Thúy Hiền	Vietnam	10 December 2025	Southeast Asian Games	Bangkok, Thailand	
100m breaststroke	1:10.27		Nguyễn Thúy Hiền	Vietnam	20 July 2026	Asian Age Group Championships	Samutprakan, Thailand	
200m breaststroke	2:30.89		Nguyễn Thị Ánh Viên	Vietnam	25 August 2017	Southeast Asian Games	Kuala Lumpur, Malaysia	
50m butterfly	27.18		Nguyễn Thúy Hiền	Vietnam	15 December 2025	Southeast Asian Games	Bangkok, Thailand	
100m butterfly	1:00.65		Lê Thị Mỹ Thảo	Vietnam	9 December 2019	Southeast Asian Games	New Clark City, Philippines	
200m butterfly	2:10.92		Lê Thị Mỹ Thảo	Bình Phước	4 December 2018	8th National Games	An Giang, Vietnam	
200m individual medley	2:12.33		Nguyễn Thị Ánh Viên	People's Army of Vietnam	11 August 2015	World Cup	Moscow, Russia	
400m individual medley	4:36.85	h	Nguyễn Thị Ánh Viên	People's Army of Vietnam	6 August 2016	Olympic Games	Rio de Janeiro, Brazil	
4×100m freestyle relay	3:47.47		Nguyen Kha Nhi (57.47); Pham Thi Van (56.76); Vo Thi My Tien (56.87); Nguyễn Thúy Hiền (56.37)	Vietnam	10 December 2025	Southeast Asian Games	Bangkok, Thailand	
4×200m freestyle relay	8:14.22		Nguyen Kha Nhi (2:04.79); Vo Thi My Tien (2:02.79); Pham Thi Van (2:03.47); Nguyễn Thúy Hiền (2:03.17)	Vietnam	14 December 2025	Southeast Asian Games	Bangkok, Thailand	
4×100m medley relay	4:17.63		Nguyễn Ngoc Thuy Tien (1:04.95); Vũ Thị Phương Anh (1:12.96); Nguyễn Diệp Phương Trâm (1:01.86); Nguyễn Khả Nhi (57.86)	Ho Chi Minh City	13 October 2024	Vietnamese Championships	Da Nang, Vietnam	

Legend: # – Record awaiting ratification by Vietnam Aquatic Sports Association; WR – World record; AS – Asian record; e – equalled existing record;
Records not set in finals: h – heat; sf – semifinal; r – relay 1st leg; rh – relay heat 1st leg; b – B final; † – en route to final mark; so – swim-off; tt – time trial

=== Mixed relay ===
Event	Time	Name	Club	Date	Meet	Location	Ref
4×100 m freestyle relay	3:36.39	Bui Gia Hoang (52.01); Nguyễn Kha Nhi (57.53); Jérémie Loïc Nino Lương (50.15); Nguyễn Diệp Phương Trâm (56.70)	Ho Chi Minh City	11 October 2024	Vietnamese Championships	Da Nang, Vietnam	
4×200 m freestyle relay	7:59.90	Trần Hưng Nguyên (1:51.50); Lê Huỳnh Tú Uyên (2:10.34); Nguyễn Quang Thuấn (1:52.94); Nguyễn Thúy Hiền (2:05.12)	People's Army of Vietnam	10 October 2024	Vietnamese Championships	Da Nang, Vietnam	
4×100 m medley relay	3:55.97	Trần Hưng Nguyên (57.23); Phạm Thanh Bảo (1:00.87); Vo Thi My Tien (1:01.72); Nguyễn Thúy Hiền (56.15)	Vietnam	1 October 2025	Asian Championships	Ahmedabad, India	

Legend: # – Record awaiting ratification by Vietnam Aquatic Sports Association; WR – World record; AS – Asian record; e – equalled existing record;
Records not set in finals: h – heat; so – swim-off

== Short Course (25 m) ==
=== Men ===
Event	Time		Name	Club	Date	Meet	Location	Ref
50 m freestyle	21.88	r	Jérémie Loïc Nino Lương	C Paul-Bert Rennes	30 October 2026	French Championships	Angers, France	
100 m freestyle	47.70	h	Jérémie Loïc Nino Luong	C Paul-Bert Rennes	1 November 2026	French Championships	Angers, France	
200 m freestyle	1:45.15		Hoàng Quý Phước	Da Nang	23 March 2017	National Championships	Huế, Vietnam	
400 m freestyle	3:43.89	h	Nguyễn Huy Hoàng	Vietnam	16 December 2021	World Championships	Abu Dhabi, United Arab Emirates	
800 m freestyle	7:49.67	h, †	Nguyễn Huy Hoàng	Vietnam	20 December 2021	World Championships	Abu Dhabi, United Arab Emirates	
1500 m freestyle	14:41.00	h	Nguyễn Huy Hoàng	Vietnam	20 December 2021	World Championships	Abu Dhabi, United Arab Emirates	
50 m backstroke	23.96		Paul Lê Nguyễn	An Giang	3 March 2022	National Championships	Huế, Vietnam	
100 m backstroke	52.04		Trần Duy Khôi	Vietnam	24 September 2017	Asian Indoor and Martial Arts Games	Ashgabat, Turkmenistan	
200 m backstroke	1:54.55		Trần Hưng Nguyên	People's Army of Vietnam	4 April 2026	National Championships	Huế, Vietnam	
50m breaststroke	26.99		Phạm Thanh Bảo	Ben Tre	3 April 2026	National Championships	Huế, Vietnam	
100m breaststroke	59.01		Phạm Thanh Bảo	Ben Tre	23 March 2024	National Championships	Huế, Vietnam	
200m breaststroke	2:06.63		Phạm Thanh Bảo	Ben Tre	28 March 2024	National Championships	Huế, Vietnam	
50m butterfly	23.25	b	Jérémie Loïc Nino Luong	C Paul-Bert Rennes	25 October 2025	French Championships	Taverny, France	
100m butterfly	52.08		Hoàng Quý Phước	Da Nang	16 March 2010	National Games	Hanoi, Vietnam	
200m butterfly	1:56.60		Nguyễn Quang Thuan	People's Army of Vietnam	5 April 2026	National Championships	Huế, Vietnam	
100m individual medley	53.25		Jérémie Loïc Nino Luong	C Paul-Bert Rennes	29 October 2026	French Championships	Angers, France	
200m individual medley	1:57.59		Trần Hưng Nguyên	People's Army of Vietnam	2 April 2026	National Championships	Huế, Vietnam	
400m individual medley	4:08.80		Nguyễn Quang Thuấn	People's Army of Vietnam	1 April 2026	National Championships	Huế, Vietnam	
4×50m freestyle relay	1:33.72		Phạm Trường Giang (23.66); Nguyễn Văn Đạt (23.73); Châu Bá Anh Tư (23.80); Hoàng Quý Phước (22.53)	Da Nang	16 March 2010	National Games	Hanoi, Vietnam	
4×100m freestyle relay	3:18.65		Nguyễn Viết Tường; Hoàng Quý Phước; Nguyễn Quoc Khai Hoan; Tran Van Nguyễn Quoc	Da Nang	2 April 2026	National Championships	Huế, Vietnam	
4×200m freestyle relay	7:16.08		Nguyễn Hữu Kim Sơn; Tran Van Nguyễn Quoc; Nguyễn Viết Tường; Hoàng Quý Phước	Da Nang	12 March 2025	National Championships	Huế, Vietnam	
4×50m medley relay	1:39.27		Trần Duy Khôi; Bui Sy Nhat; Jérémie Loïc Nino Lương; Trinh Truong Vinh	Ho Chi Minh City	3 April 2026	National Championships	Huế, Vietnam	
4×100m medley relay	3:37.85		Đỗ Huy Long (55.21); Nguyễn Hữu Việt (58.61); Võ Thái Nguyên (53.96); Nguyễn Thanh Hải (50.07)	Vietnam	7 November 2009	Asian Indoor Games	Hanoi, Vietnam	

Legend: # – Record awaiting ratification by Vietnam Aquatic Sports Association; WR – World record; AS – Asian record; e – equalled existing record;
Records not set in finals: h – heat; sf – semifinal; r – relay 1st leg; rh – relay heat 1st leg; b – B final; † – en route to final mark; so – swim-off; tt – time trial

=== Women ===
Event	Time		Name	Club	Date	Meet	Location	Ref
50m freestyle	25.26		Nguyễn Thúy Hiền	People's Army of Vietnam	14 March 2025	National Championships	Huế, Vietnam	
100m freestyle	55.52		Nguyễn Thúy Hiền	People's Army of Vietnam	12 March 2025	National Championships	Huế, Vietnam	
200m freestyle	1:56.06		Nguyễn Thị Ánh Viên	Vietnam	24 September 2017	Asian Indoor and Martial Arts Games	Ashgabat, Turkmenistan	
400m freestyle	4:09.80	h	Nguyễn Thị Ánh Viên	People's Army of Vietnam	5 December 2014	World Championships	Doha, Qatar	
800m freestyle	8:27.36		Nguyễn Thị Ánh Viên	People's Army of Vietnam	4 December 2014	World Championships	Doha, Qatar	
1500m freestyle								
50m backstroke	28.61		Nguyễn Thị Kim Tuyến	Ho Chi Minh City	18 March 2010	National Games	Hanoi, Vietnam	
100m backstroke	59.42		Nguyễn Thị Ánh Viên	Vietnam	24 September 2017	Asian Indoor and Martial Arts Games	Ashgabat, Turkmenistan	
200m backstroke	2:08.07	h	Nguyễn Thị Ánh Viên	People's Army of Vietnam	25 October 2016	World Cup	Tokyo, Japan	
50m breaststroke	31.60		Nguyễn Thúy Hiền	People's Army of Vietnam	11 March 2025	National Championships	Huế, Vietnam	
100m breaststroke	1:08.66		Vo Thi My Tien	Long An	13 March 2025	National Championships	Huế, Vietnam	
200m breaststroke	2:26.44		Vo Thi My Tien	Long An	16 March 2025	National Championships	Huế, Vietnam	
50m butterfly	26.98		Nguyễn Thúy Hiền	People's Army of Vietnam	11 March 2025	National Championships	Huế, Vietnam	
100m butterfly	59.28		Nguyễn Diệp Phương Trâm	Ho Chi Minh City	14 March 2025	National Championships	Huế, Vietnam	
200m butterfly	2:09.77		Vo Thi My Tien	Tây Ninh	5 April 2026	National Championships	Huế, Vietnam	
100m individual medley	1:00.68		Nguyễn Thị Ánh Viên	Vietnam	25 September 2017	Asian Indoor and Martial Arts Games	Ashgabat, Turkmenistan	
200m individual medley	2:09.39		Nguyễn Thị Ánh Viên	People's Army of Vietnam	25 October 2016	World Cup	Tokyo, Japan	
400m individual medley	4:32.19	h	Nguyễn Thị Ánh Viên	People's Army of Vietnam	6 December 2016	World Championships	Windsor, Canada	
4×50m freestyle relay	1:49.82		Trần Tâm Nguyện (27.35); Hồ Nhật Song Vy (27.78); Võ Thị Thanh Vy (28.23); Nguyễn Thị Kim Tuyến (26.46)	Ho Chi Minh City	15 March 2010	National Games	Hanoi, Vietnam	
4×100m freestyle relay	3:51.48		Nguyễn Kha Nhi; Vũ Thị Phương Anh; Nguyễn Ngoc Thuy Tien; Nguyễn Diệp Phương Trâm	Ho Chi Minh City	31 March 2026	National Championships	Huế, Vietnam	
4×200m freestyle relay	8:17.89		Vũ Thị Phương Anh; Nguyễn Diệp Phương Trâm; Nguyễn Ngoc Thuy Tien; Nguyễn Khả Nhi	Ho Chi Minh City	2 April 2026	National Championships	Huế, Vietnam	
4×50m medley relay	1:54.27		Nguyễn Ngoc Thuy Tien; Vũ Thị Phương Anh; Nguyễn Diệp Phương Trâm; Nguyễn Kha Nhi	Ho Chi Minh City	14 March 2025	National Championships	Huế, Vietnam	
4×100m medley relay	4:09.95		Nguyễn Ngoc Thuy Tien; Vũ Thị Phương Anh; Nguyễn Diệp Phương Trâm; Nguyễn Kha Nhi	Ho Chi Minh City	1 April 2026	National Championships	Huế, Vietnam	

Legend: # – Record awaiting ratification by Vietnam Aquatic Sports Association; WR – World record; AS – Asian record; e – equalled existing record;
Records not set in finals: h – heat; sf – semifinal; r – relay 1st leg; rh – relay heat 1st leg; b – B final; † – en route to final mark; so – swim-off; tt – time trial
