= Christie Chue =

Singaporean swimmer (born 2000)

Personal information
- Nationality: Singaporean
- Born: 3 July 2000 (age 26)

Sport
- Sport: Swimming
Medal record
Women's swimming
Representing Singapore
Event	1st	2nd	3rd
Southeast Asian Games	7	2	3
Commonwealth Youth Games	1	0	0
Total	8	2	3
Southeast Asian Games
Gold medal – first place	2015 Singapore	4×200 m freestyle
Gold medal – first place	2017 Kuala Lumpur	4×200 m freestyle
Gold medal – first place	2019 Philippines	200 m breaststroke
Gold medal – first place	2019 Philippines	4×200 m freestyle
Gold medal – first place	2019 Philippines	4×100 m medley
Gold medal – first place	2021 Hanoi	4×100 m freestyle
Gold medal – first place	2021 Hanoi	4x200 m freestyle
Silver medal – second place	2019 Philippines	100 m breaststroke
Silver medal – second place	2021 Hanoi	200 m breaststroke
Bronze medal – third place	2019 Philippines	50 m breaststroke
Bronze medal – third place	2021 Hanoi	100 m breaststroke
Bronze medal – third place	2021 Hanoi	50 m breaststroke
Commonwealth Youth Games
Gold medal – first place	2017 Nassau	50 m breaststroke
Silver medal – second place	2017 Nassau	100 m breaststroke

Christie Chue May Mun Ee (born 3 July 2000) is a Singaporean swimmer. She competed in the women's 50 metre breaststroke at the 2019 World Aquatics Championships held in Gwangju, South Korea and she did not advance to compete in the semi-finals.
