= Singapore Aquatics =

Singaporean national governing body for competitive swimming

- Sport: Aquatics
- Jurisdiction: National
- Abbreviation: SAQ
- Founded: 1939
- Affiliation: FINA
- Affiliation date: 1993
- Regional affiliation: AASF
- Headquarters: 7 Stadium Drive #01-50, Singapore 397632
- President: Kenneth Goh

Official website
- www.swimming.org.sg
- (Singapore)

Singapore Aquatics (SAQ) is the national governing body for competitive swimming, diving, synchronised swimming, water polo and open water swimming in Singapore. SAQ is also charged with selecting the Singapore Olympic Swimming team and any other teams that officially represent Singapore, as well as the overall organisation and operation of the sport within the country.

Founded in 1939 as the Singapore Amateur Swimming Association (SASA); the body adopted a new name, Singapore Swimming Association (SSA), in 2002. It has been a member of FINA since its founding, and is one of the founding members of the Asia Swimming Federation. In July 2023, SSA was rebranded as Singapore Aquatics.

== History ==
=== Founding ===
In April 1939, three major swimming clubs (namely the Singapore Swimming Club, the Chinese Swimming Club, and the Young Men's Christian Association (YMCA)) formed the Singapore Amateur Swimming Association (SASA). Immediately after this formation, the Tiger Swimming Club, Singapore Cantonese Swimming Union, Overseas Chinese Swimming Union, and the land, sea, and air force units of the British Armed Forces joined SASA as affiliates.

=== Halt in activities ===
All SASA activities were halted from 1939 to 1945 due to World War II.

Participation in international competitions for swimming, diving and water polo resumed in 1948 after the war.

=== Renaming and growth ===
In 1951, Singapore won four gold medals at the inaugural Asian Games, half of the swimming gold medals at the Games and two silver medals. Neo Chwee Kok won the gold medals for the 400m, 800m and 1,500m and the 4x100m freestyle events. The men’s water polo team won the silver medal.

June 1986: Four training branches were established under the SPEX21 Development Programme: Bedok, Clementi, Queenstown, and Toa Payoh, with the full support and endorsement of the Singapore Sports Council (now Sport Singapore).

2002: SASA was renamed Singapore Swimming Association (SSA) to signify the movement towards professional management of swimming, water polo, diving, and synchronised swimming and its governance.

2004: Leadership transition and changes from SSA occurred due to a need to comply with the Code of Governance.

2007: SSA branches and the People's Association joined forces under the auspices of the Grassroots Aquatic Club (TGAC).

In March 2023, SSA announced that it will be rebranded as Singapore Aquatics (SAQ) in July. In July, SSA was rebranded as SAQ. In October, SAQ announced an Aquatics Hall of Fame to be launched in 2024 as part of Singapore Aquatics' (SAQ) 85th anniversary celebrations. The Hall of Fame is to pay tribute to athletes (swimmers, water polo players, artistic swimmers and divers) who contributed to swimming in Singapore.

== Swimming ==
Swimming is the country's strongest sport. It peaked when Singaporean swimmer Joseph Schooling won an Olympic gold medal in the Men's 100 metre butterfly, the first Asian swimmer ever to do so, having also broken the Olympic record in the process. Singapore is also a powerhouse in swimming at the regional Southeast Asian Games, having consistently been the best nation for most of its editions and winning the most medals by a wide margin.

2005: SSA introduced a new concept of competition focus (Target vs. Preparatory) at the different elite and developmental levels. Performance-based selection criteria, with stipulated qualifying windows, were introduced and published on the web for the public to access.

Following the new concept, SSA revamped the 1st Singapore National Swimming Championships 2005, held in June, which incorporated an international competition format. This meant heats were swam in the morning, evening finals sessions, dope testing, etc.

2006: Singapore hosted its first major regional swimming competition with the Milo 7th Asia Swimming Championships Singapore 2006 in March.

In the same year on the FINA front, SSA won the right to host the FINA Swimming World Cup Series 2007–2009 (April). SSA also hosted two FINA events: the FINA Marathon Swimming World Cup 2006 and the FINA 7th World Swimming Officials Seminar Singapore 2006 (October).

The latter event saw over 100 officials from nearly 50 countries in attendance.

2007: SSA successfully hosted the FINA/Arena Swimming World Cup 2007 Singapore at the Singapore Sports School Swimming Complex in October. It was the first highest-level aquatics competition to ever be run in Singapore. In a fitting tribute, Natalie Coughlin (USA) broke the 100m backstroke (SCM) world record, 'christening' this world-class competition venue.

In the same month, SSA also hosted the FINA Fuji Xerox 10 km Marathon Swimming World Cup 2007.

2009: Former National Swimmer and Olympian Ang Peng Siong was appointed as Singapore's first National Head Coach of Swimming.

2010: SSA organised the 1st Inter-School Synchronised Swimming Competition held at the Co-Curricular Activities Branch.

Singapore also hosted the first edition of the 2010 Summer Youth Olympic Games (YOG) at the Singapore Sports School Swimming Complex.

2012: International coach Ian Turner was appointed SSA's national swimming technical director and head coach.

2014: The opening of the Singapore Sports Hub began with the opening of its first facility, the OCBC Aquatic Center, which henceforth will serve as home to Singapore Aquatic Sports (namely, swimming, synchronised swimming, water polo, and diving).

2015: Former Olympian and competitive swimmer Sergio Lopez was appointed as the national head coach (swimming). He and national assistant head coach Gary Tan then established the National Training Center (NTC), where all national swimmers will train together.

SSA then launched its "Swim With Us" campaign, announcing a brand new identity for the national team. The campaign was an initiative to rally the public behind aquatic sports in Singapore.

The perfect opportunity for Coaches Sergio and Gary to put the effectiveness of the new system to the test arrived in the form of the 28th South-East Asian Games in June. All aquatic events of the 2015 SEA Games were held at the OCBC Aquatic Center, Singapore. A total of 29 swimmers represented Singapore, competing on home ground. They walked away at the end of the meet with a record-breaking 42 medals, the highest medal tally amongst all other sports in Singapore.

In the same year, SSA sent a total of 11 athletes to compete in the 16th FINA World Championships held in Kazan, Russia.

SSA also successfully hosted the 5th FINA World Junior Swimming Championships at the OCBC Aquatic Center.

== Water polo ==
2006: Water Polo began its rebuilding process with a leadership renewal.

2008: SSA hosted its first major international water polo tournament, The Road to Beijing Pre-Olympics Water Polo Invitation 2008. The event saw top water polo teams from Australia, China, Croatia, Germany, Greece, Italy, Montenegro, and Russia engage in a talented display of strategy and athleticism.

== Diving ==
2007: SSA restarted its diving programme after a lapse of 12 years.

2010: Despite SSA's efforts to make its mark on the diving scene, they saw little success with the National Diving Team. It was only at the 2010 Summer Youth Olympic Games (YOG) that Singapore Diving made its comeback after 7 years. All diving events of the 2010 YOG were held at the Toa Payoh Swimming Complex.

2016: In January, Shannon Roy was appointed National Head Coach (Diving), following the resignation of former National Head Coach Xiu Jie, who returned to Canada to be with his family.

== See also ==
- List of Singaporean records in swimming
- List of Southeast Asian Games records in swimming
- Sport in Singapore
- Singapore Sports Hub
