= Khiew Hoe Yean =

Malaysian swimmer

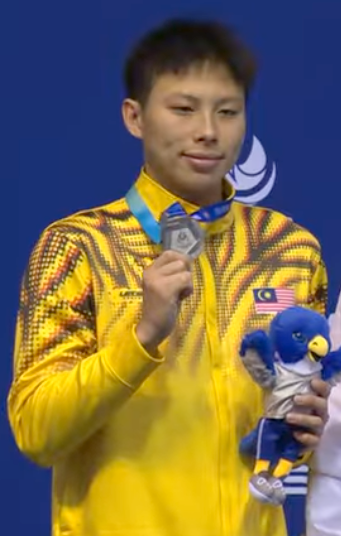
- At the 2025 Summer World University Games

Personal information
- Born: 2 September 2002 (age 24) Malaysia
- Height: 180 cm (5 ft 11 in)

Chinese name
- Chinese: 丘浩延
- Hanyu Pinyin: Qiū Hàoyán

Sport
- Country: Malaysia
- Sport: Swimming
- Strokes: Backstroke, Freestyle
Medal record
Men's swimming
Representing Malaysia
Asian Championships
Bronze medal – third place	2025 Ahmedabad	400 m freestyle
Bronze medal – third place	2025 Ahmedabad	4×200 m freestyle
World University Games
Silver medal – second place	2025 Rhine-Ruhr	400 m freestyle
Southeast Asian Games
Gold medal – first place	2021 Vietnam	200 m freestyle
Gold medal – first place	2023 Cambodia	200 m freestyle
Gold medal – first place	2025 Thailand	200 m freestyle
Gold medal – first place	2025 Thailand	400 m freestyle
Silver medal – second place	2021 Vietnam	400 m freestyle
Silver medal – second place	2021 Vietnam	200 m backstroke
Silver medal – second place	2021 Vietnam	4×200 m freestyle
Silver medal – second place	2023 Cambodia	4×100 m freestyle
Silver medal – second place	2023 Cambodia	400 m freestyle
Silver medal – second place	2025 Thailand	4×200 m freestyle
Bronze medal – third place	2019 Philippines	200 m backstroke
Bronze medal – third place	2019 Philippines	4×200 m freestyle
Bronze medal – third place	2021 Vietnam	800 m freestyle
Bronze medal – third place	2023 Cambodia	200 m backstroke
Bronze medal – third place	2023 Cambodia	4×200 m freestyle
Bronze medal – third place	2025 Thailand	4×100 m freestyle

Khiew Hoe Yean (born 2 September 2002) is a Malaysian swimmer. He got his first gold medal for Malaysia in swimming at the 2021 Southeast Asian Games in the 200 m freestyle event. At the 2022 World Aquatics Championships, he broke the national record in the 400 m freestyle event.
