= Luong Jérémie Loïc Nino =

Vietnamese swimmer (born 2000)

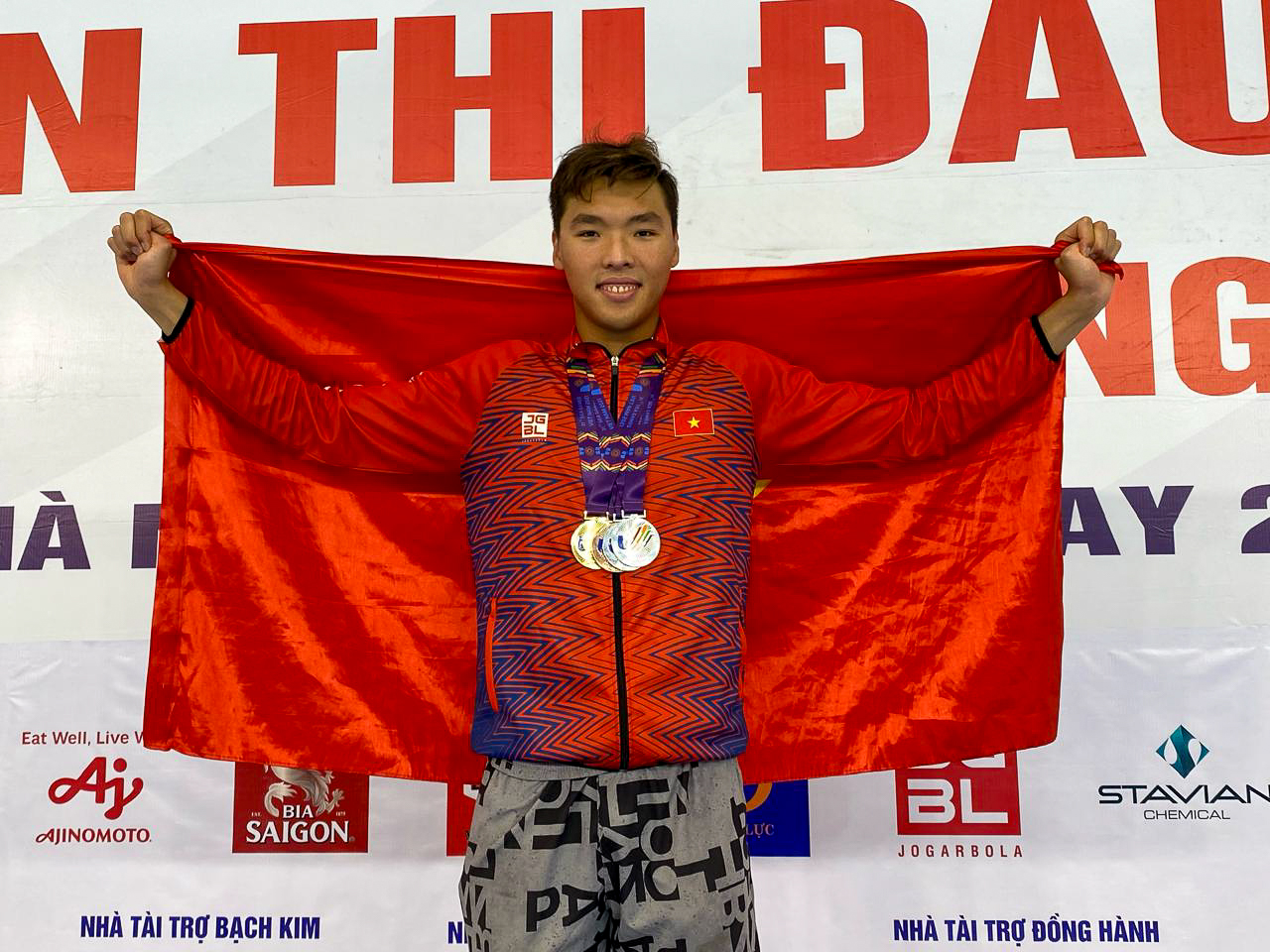
- Luong at 31st Southeast Asian Games

Personal information
- Full name: Luong Jérémie Loïc Nino
- National team: Vietnam
- Born: 25 July 2000 (age 26) Châtenay-Malabry, France
- Height: 1.94 m (6 ft 4 in)
- Weight: 83 kg (183 lb)

Sport
- Sport: Swimming
- Strokes: Butterfly, freestyle
- Club: Cercle Paul Bert Rennes, France
- College team: University of Michigan
- Coach: Mathieu Burban
Medal record
Men's swimming
Representing Vietnam
Southeast Asian Games
Gold medal – first place	2021 Vietnam	4×100 m freestyle
Silver medal – second place	2021 Vietnam	100 m freestyle
Silver medal – second place	2021 Vietnam	4×100 m medley
Silver medal – second place	2025 Thailand	4×100 m freestyle
Bronze medal – third place	2021 Vietnam	50 m freestyle
Bronze medal – third place	2023 Cambodia	4×100 m freestyle
Bronze medal – third place	2023 Cambodia	100 m freestyle
Bronze medal – third place	2023 Cambodia	50 m freestyle
Bronze medal – third place	2025 Thailand	4×100 m medley
ASEAN School Games
Silver medal – second place	2017 Vietnam	200 m medley
Silver medal – second place	2017 Vietnam	400 m medley
Bronze medal – third place	2017 Vietnam	50 m backstroke

Luong Jérémie Loïc Nino (born 25 July 2000) is a male athlete of the Vietnam national swimming team. Having won the gold medal for team Vietnam at the 31st Southeast Asian Games in the 4 × 100 m freestyle Relay and silver in the 100 m freestyle, Luong holds multiple national records.

== Career ==
=== Early life ===
Luong was born on July 25, 2000, in Châtenay-Malabry, France to a Vietnamese mother and a French father. Growing up in Ho Chi Minh City, Vietnam, he attended the British International School Ho Chi Minh City. Luong started swimming in 2009 at the Yết Kiêu Aquatics Center, and joined the Vietnamese national swimming team in 2018. He later committed to the University of Michigan, starting with the class of 2022 and swimming for the Michigan Wolverines swimming and diving.

=== Swimming career ===
In 2020, Luong transferred to Cercle Paul Bert in Rennes where he trains with his coach Mathieu Burban. In 2023, he qualified and participated in the 50 m freestyle, 100 m freestyle, and 50 m butterfly at the 2023 World Aquatics Championships in Fukuoka, Japan.

== Honors and awards ==
- Victorix Ludorum (Overall Player of the Year), awarded by British International school HCMC: 2018
- Bằng khen của Thủ tướng chính phủ nước Việt Nam (Certificate of Merite from the Prime Minister of Viet Nam): 2022

== Philanthropy ==
Luong organized a toothpaste collection drive at the British International school in Ho Chi Minh city, which resulted in over 3,000 toothpastes collected for a medical expedition to Quảng Nam province.
