= Letitia Sim =

Singaporean swimmer (born 2003)

Personal information
- Full name: Letitia Sim En Yi
- Born: 3 March 2003 (age 23) Singapore

Sport
- Sport: Swimming
- Strokes: Breaststroke, Butterfly, Individual Medley
- College team: University of Michigan
Medal record
Women's swimming
Representing Singapore
Event	1st	2nd	3rd
Southeast Asian Games	12	2	1
Total	12	2	1
Southeast Asian Games
Gold medal – first place	2025 Thailand	50 m breaststroke
Gold medal – first place	2025 Thailand	100 m breaststroke
Gold medal – first place	2025 Thailand	200 m breaststroke
Gold medal – first place	2025 Thailand	200 m medley
Gold medal – first place	2025 Thailand	4×100 m medley
Gold medal – first place	2023 Cambodia	100 m breaststroke
Gold medal – first place	2023 Cambodia	200 m breaststroke
Gold medal – first place	2023 Cambodia	200 m medley
Gold medal – first place	2023 Cambodia	4×100 m medley
Gold medal – first place	2021 Vietnam	50 m breaststroke
Gold medal – first place	2021 Vietnam	100 m breaststroke
Gold medal – first place	2021 Vietnam	4×100 m medley
Silver medal – second place	2023 Cambodia	50 m breaststroke
Silver medal – second place	2021 Vietnam	200 m medley
Bronze medal – third place	2021 Vietnam	200 m breaststroke

Letitia Sim En Yi (born 3 March 2003) is a Singaporean former swimmer who specialises in breaststroke, butterfly, and individual medley events. She is also the national record holder in the women's 50m, 100m, 200m breaststroke, and the 200m Individual Medley.

== Swimming career ==
She participated at the 2022 Asian Games where she registered two fourth-place finishes in the 100m and 200m breaststroke events and also set a new national record in the 50m breaststroke where she finished seventh. She also participated in the 2022 Commonwealth Games.

At the 2023 World Aquatics Swimming World Cup in Berlin, Letitia won bronze at the 200m breaststroke event with a timing of 02:24.15, setting a national record.

In 2023, at the Japan Open, Sim clocked a time of 1:06.36 at the women's 100m breaststroke event. She clinched silver behind Japan's Reona Aoki. This timing meant that she broke the national record she previously set, and also meeting the 2024 Summer Olympics "A" cut. She also won silver a few days later at the 200m individual medley.

On her Olympics debut at the 2024 Olympics, she participated in the 100m and 200m breaststroke and 4x100m medley relay events. She finished 25th and 22nd respectively for her individual events.

At the 2025 SEA Games, Letitia became the first swimmer to complete the SEA Games hat-trick in her stroke.

On May 22, 2026, Sim had announced her retirement from competitive swimming.

== Personal life ==
Letitia has a younger sister, Levenia Sim who is also a national swimmer of Singapore as well. Both of them competed at the 4x100m medley relay together.
