= Ariana Dirkzwager =

Laotian swimmer (born 2004)

Personal information
- Born: February 6, 2004 (age 22) Wichita, Kansas, U.S.
- Height: 5 ft 7 in (170 cm)

Sport
- Sport: Swimming
- College team: Georgia Tech Yellow Jackets

Ariana Southa Dirkzwager (born February 6, 2004) is an American-Laotian swimmer. Born in Kansas, she competes for Laos internationally. She qualified to represent Laos at the 2024 Summer Olympics.

== Biography ==
Dirkzwager was born on February 6, 2004, in Wichita, Kansas. She is of Laotian descent, with her mother being from there. Her sister, Astrid, also is a swimmer. She swam at an early age with the Wichita Swim Club and continued to swim competitively at Wichita East High School, spending four years on the varsity and being captain as a senior. She swam for a time with her sister at Wichita East and won seven state championships, including four individual gold medals. She set a city league record in the 100-yard freestyle event, which still stood as of 2024, and was named an All-American in the 200 freestyle.

As a junior at Wichita East, Dirkzwager announced her commitment to compete collegiately for the Georgia Tech Yellow Jackets, joining her sister. At Georgia Tech, she majored in business administration. She is coached by Olympic gold medalist Courtney Shealy with the Yellow Jackets.

In 2023, Dirkzwager began competing internationally while representing Laos. She participated at the 2023 SEA Games in four events and set a national record in the 200m freestyle event. Later, she competed for Laos at the 2024 World Aquatics Championships in the 100m freestyle and 200m backstroke. In July 2024, she was selected to compete for Laos at the 2024 Summer Olympics in Paris, receiving a universality spot.
