= Laos at the 2025 SEA Games =

- IOC code: LAO
- NOC: National Olympic Committee of Lao
- Website: www.olympiclao.org.la (in Lao and English)

in Bangkok, Thailand
- Competitors: 364
- Medals: Gold 2 Silver 3 Bronze 13 Total 18

SEA Games appearances
- 1959; 1961; 1965; 1967; 1969; 1971; 1973; 1975–1987; 1989; 1991; 1993; 1995; 1997; 1999; 2001; 2003; 2005; 2007; 2009; 2011; 2013; 2015; 2017; 2019; 2021; 2023; 2025; 2027; 2029

Laos participated at the 33rd SEA Games from 9 to 20 December 2025 in Bangkok, Thailand.

== Competitors ==
The following is the list of the number of competitors participating at the Games per sport/discipline.

Sport	Men	Women	Total
3x3 basketball	4	4	8
Air sports	3	0	3
Archery	2	2	4
Athletics	5	4	9
Badminton	6	0	6
Baseball	18	0	18
Beach volleyball	5	0	5
Billiards and snooker	4	3	7
Boxing	5	0	5
Chess	6	4	10
Cycling	4	1	5
Esports	19	10	29
Fencing	1	0	1
Floorball	16	0	16
Football	23	0	23
Golf	4	3	7
Gymnastics	0	1	1
Judo	6	5	11
Ju-jitsu	4	3	7
Karate	5	3	8
Kickboxing	5	3	8
Muaythai	8	2	10
Pencak silat	8	3	11
Pétanque	12	12	24
Practical shooting	8	4	12
Rugby sevens	13	0	13
Sepak takraw	12	11	23
Swimming	3	7	10
Table tennis	5	0	5
Taekwondo	4	5	10
Tennis	5	4	9
Teqball	4	4	8
Tug of war	9	8	17
Volleyball	14	0	14
Weightlifting	2	1	3
Wrestling	2	2	4
Wushu	2	2	4
Total	256	111	367

== 3x3 basketball ==
Summary

Team	Event	Preliminary Round				Semifinals	Final / BM	
Team	Event	Opposition Score	Opposition Score	Opposition Score	Rank	Opposition Score	Opposition Score	Rank
Laos men's	Men's 3x3	Malaysia; L 5–21	Vietnam; L 9–21	Philippines; L 10–21	4	Did not advance		
Laos women's	Women's 3x3	Singapore; L 0–21	Vietnam; L 7–21	Thailand; L 2–22	4	Did not advance		

=== Men's tournament ===
Preliminary Rounds – Group B

Pos	Team	Pld	W	L	PF	PA	PD	Qualification
1	Philippines	3	3	0	63	44	+19	Advance to Semifinals
2	Malaysia	3	2	1	61	38	+23	Advance to Semifinals
3	Vietnam	3	1	2	48	51	−3	
4	Laos	3	0	3	24	63	−39	

Updated to match(es) played on 10 December 2025. Source: 2025 SEA Games

10 December
11:15

Report

Malaysia	21–5	Laos

Nimibutr Stadium, Bangkok

10 December
15:55

Report

Laos	9–21	Vietnam

Nimibutr Stadium, Bangkok

11 December
11:00

Report

Philippines	21–10	Laos

Nimibutr Stadium, Bangkok

=== Women's tournament ===
Preliminary Rounds – Group B

Pos	Team	Pld	W	L	PF	PA	PD	Qualification
1	Thailand	3	3	0	58	30	+28	Advance to Semifinals
2	Vietnam	3	2	1	58	40	+18	Advance to Semifinals
3	Singapore	3	1	2	49	40	+9	
4	Laos	3	0	3	9	64	−55	

Source: 2025 SEA Games

10 December
12:50

Report

Singapore	21–0	Laos

Nimibutr Stadium, Bangkok

10 December
17:20

Report

Laos	7–21	Vietnam

Nimibutr Stadium, Bangkok

10 December
19:35

Report

Thailand	22–2	Laos

Nimibutr Stadium, Bangkok

== Badminton ==
Player	Event	Quarterfinals	Semifinals	Final	
Player	Event	Opposition Score	Opposition Score	Opposition Score	Rank
Namboun Luangamath; Phanthalang Outhaithani; Vixunnalath Phichith; Phonesack Sokthavy; Xayyalath Souksavath	Men's team	Singapore (SGP); L 0–3	Did not advance		

=== Team ===
Quarterfinals

Singapore
3
Thammasat University Rangsit Campus
7 December 2025 15:00 UTC+7

Laos
0

			1	2	3
1	(Singapore) (Laos)	Loh Kean Yew; Xayyalath Souksavat	21; 8	21; 11
2	(Singapore) (Laos)	Jason Teh; Phonesack Sokthavy	21; 12	21; 15
3	(Singapore) (Laos)	Joel Koh; Vixunnalath Phichith	21; 11	21; 7
4	(Singapore) (Laos)	Wesley Koh / Junsuke Kubo; Namboun Luangamath / Phonesack Sokhavy				not played
5	(Singapore) (Laos)	Kittisak Namdash / Jia Hao Howin Wong; Phanthalang Outhaithani / Vixunnalath Phichith				not played

== Baseball ==
Team	Event	Group Stage							Final / BM	
Team	Event	Opposition Score	Opposition Score	Opposition Score	Opposition Score	Opposition Score	Opposition Score	Rank	Opposition Score	Rank
Laos men's	Men's tournament	Singapore; L 1–13	Thailand; L 1–12	Vietnam; W 16–0	Indonesia; L 3–4	Malaysia; W 9–5	Philippines; L 0–12	5	Did not advance	

== Football ==
Summary

Key:

- A.E.T – After extra time.
- P – Match decided by penalty-shootout.

Team	Event	Group Stage				Semifinal	Final / BM
Team	Event	Opposition Score	Opposition Score	Rank	Opposition Score	Opposition Score	Rank
Laos men's	Men's tournament	Vietnam; L 1–2	Malaysia; L 1–4	3	Did not advance		

=== Men's tournament ===
Team roster

Laos announced their final squad on 1 December 2025.

Head coach: (South Korea) Ha Hyeok-jun

No.	Pos.	Player	Date of birth (age)	Club
1	GK	Kop Lokphathip	8 May 2006 (aged 19)	(Lao Football Federation) Ezra
2	DF	Phoutthavong Sangvilay	16 October 2004 (aged 21)	(Football Association of Thailand) BG Pathum United
3	MF	Sonevilay Phetviengsy	27 May 2004 (aged 21)	(Lao Football Federation) Master
4	MF	Sayfon Keohanam	11 July 2006 (aged 19)	(Football Association of Thailand) Suphanburi
5	DF	Phetdavanh Somsanith	24 April 2004 (aged 21)	(Lao Football Federation) Master
6	MF	Chanthavixay Khounthoumphone	17 February 2004 (aged 21)	(Lao Football Federation) Ezra
7	MF	Khonesavanh Keonuchanh	4 June 2004 (aged 21)	(Lao Football Federation) Mazda Laos GB
8	MF	Binly Donsanouphit	30 June 2008 (aged 17)	(Lao Football Federation) Ezra
9	FW	Souksavanh Hopchakkavan	8 September 2006 (aged 19)	(Lao Football Federation) Namtha United
10	FW	Peter Phanthavong	15 February 2006 (aged 19)	(Lao Football Federation) Ezra
11	FW	Somvang Choummaly	2 April 2006 (aged 19)	(Lao Football Federation) Mazda Laos GB
12	GK	Xaysomphong Thipphavong	2009 (aged 15–16)	(Lao Football Federation) Mazda Laos GB
13	DF	Xayasouk Keovisone	21 July 2006 (aged 19)	(Lao Football Federation) Ezra
14	DF	Phetvixay Phimmasen	8 January 2005 (aged 20)	(Lao Football Federation) Ezra
15	MF	Damoth Thongkhamsavath	3 April 2004 (aged 21)	(Vietnam Football Federation) Đông Á Thanh Hóa
16	DF	Saleumxay Phommavong	7 August 2003 (aged 22)	(Lao Football Federation) Ezra
17	FW	Khampane Douangvilay	5 February 2004 (aged 21)	(Lao Football Federation) Master
18	GK	Soulisak Souvankham	10 September 2007 (aged 18)	(Lao Football Federation) Chanthabouly
19	MF	Bounphaeng Xaysombath	5 February 2005 (aged 20)	(Lao Football Federation) Luang Prabang
20	DF	Okham Latsachack	22 July 2007 (aged 18)	(Lao Football Federation) Lao Army
21	DF	Vongsakda Chanthaleuxay	28 November 2004 (aged 21)	(Lao Football Federation) Mazda Laos GB
22	DF	Oun Phetvongsa	29 September 2003 (aged 22)	(Lao Football Federation) Namtha United
23	FW	Thanousack Nanthavongdouangsy	21 August 2006 (aged 19)	(Lao Football Federation) Ezra

Group play

Pos	Team	Pld	W	D	L	GF	GA	GD	Pts	Qualification
1	Vietnam	2	2	0	0	4	1	+3	6	Advance to knockout stage
2	Malaysia	2	1	0	1	4	3	+1	3	Advance to knockout stage
3	Laos	2	0	0	2	2	6	−4	0	

Source: Soccerway
Rules for classification: Group stage tiebreakers
3 December 2025
16:00

Laos	1–2	Vietnam
Khampane 33'	Report	Nguyễn Đình Bắc 28', 60'

Rajamangala Stadium, Bangkok (Note: Originally planned to be held in Tinsulanon Stadium, but moved to Rajamangala Stadium due to Cyclone Senyar hitting Songkhla province.)
Referee: Rustam Lutfullin (Uzbekistan)
6 December 2025
16:00

Malaysia	4–1	Laos
Haykal 33'; Haqimi 59'; Moses 62'; Muhammad 90'	Report	Bounphaeng 4'

Rajamangala Stadium, Bangkok
Referee: Payam Heydari (Iran)
