= Sports Authority of Thailand =

National sports governing body of Thailand

The Sports Authority of Thailand (SAT; Thai: การกีฬาแห่งประเทศไทย) is Thailand's national sports governing body. It operates as a state enterprise under the oversight of the Ministry of Tourism and Sports, and was established in 1985, replacing the Sports Promotion Organization of Thailand which had been operating since 1964. Its purpose, among other tasks, is to promote sports and serve as the national coordinator of sporting matters.

== T Sports 7 ==
T Sports 7
- Country: Thailand
- Broadcast area: Thailand; Southeast Asia (Satellites Only)
- Headquarters: No. 286 Ramkhamhaeng Road, Huamark Subdistrict, Bangkapi District, Bangkok

Programming
- Language(s): Thai
- Picture format: 576i SDTV

Ownership
- Owner: Sports Authority of Thailand; Ministry of Tourism and Sports
- Sister channels: Channel 9 MCOT HD

History
- Launched: Satellite system: 1 July 2008; 16 years ago Terrestrial digital: 23 July 2021; 3 years ago Satellite and digital: 24 December 2021; 3 years ago

Links
- Website: www.tsports7.com

Availability

Terrestrial
- Digital: Channel 7 (SDTV) (MCOT - MUX3) in Bangkok

T Sports (Thai: ทีสปอร์ต) is a Thai sports television channel operated by the Sports Authority of Thailand, Ministry of Tourism and Sports, broadcast via satellite and cable television and digital terrestrial television on channel number 7 under an operating license type of public services, sports programs, health and quality of life.

=== Presenters ===
- Chainon Hankhirirat
- Waruntorn Somkitrungroj
- Natcha Senabutr
- Phakjira Jirawattanaphan
- Kunlaya Krachangkul
- Chamaiporn Heanprasert
- Peeranat Champangern
- Wirawit Charoenchuea
- Manucha Jemoon
- Jitkon Srikhamkrua
- Kittikorn Udomphon
- Khajohnyot Chokthanaset
- Watcharin Chatuchai
- Worapat Arunphakdi

== See also ==
- National Olympic Committee of Thailand
