= Swimming at the 2015 SEA Games =

- Venue: OCBC Aquatic Centre, Kallang, Singapore
- Dates: 6–11 June 2015
- Competitors: 129 from 9 nations

Swimming competitions at the 2015 SEA Games was held at the OCBC Aquatic Centre in the Singapore Sports Hub in Kallang, Singapore from 6 to 11 June 2015. Built only a year earlier, the venue is hosting the SEA Games for the first time. It was used to host the second Southeast Asian Swimming Championships in 2014 as a test bed for the organisers, with the 2015 Southeast Asian Games volunteers hired to also volunteer in the 2014 Swimming Championships to help in the familiarisation of the new venue.

With swimming being a traditional gold mine for Singapore having been the country's strongest sport, there were high expectations for the squad to deliver another record haul of medals, especially given that Singapore is the host country. Two male athletes in particular, namely Joseph Schooling and Quah Zheng Wen were expected to shoulder the responsibility for the hosts, being entered in nine and 12 events respectively. Other athletes expected to shine include Quah Ting Wen, Tao Li and Danny Yeo.

This Aquatics discipline featured 38 long course events: 19 for males and 19 for females. This restores six events which were dropped by the previous host, Myanmar in the 2013 edition.

Indonesia, Thailand and Vietnam were expecting to present the most resistance to Singapore's ambitions. In particular, Nguyễn Thị Ánh Viên from Vietnam contested strongly especially in 12 events.

== Participating nations ==
A total of 129 athletes from nine nations competed in swimming at the 2015 SEA Games:

- Cambodia (7)
- Indonesia (22)
- Laos (4)
- Malaysia (17)
- Myanmar (3)
- Philippines (12)
- Singapore (29)
- Thailand (27)
- Vietnam (8)

== Events ==
In most editions of the games, the swimming programme follows closely with the Olympics swimming programme, offering 32 pool events except the two 10 km open-water marathons. However, in 2011, six more non-Olympic events, namely the shorter 50 metre events for backstroke, breaststroke and butterfly were included. Although these were again dropped in 2013, Singapore re-introduced the 38-event programme to capitalise on its strength in swimming.

The following events were contested (all pool events were long course, and distances are in metres unless stated):

- Freestyle: 50, 100, 200, 400, 800 (women), and 1,500 (men);
- Backstroke: 50, 100 and 200;
- Breaststroke: 50, 100 and 200;
- Butterfly: 50, 100 and 200;
- Individual medley: 200 and 400;
- Relays: 4×100 free, 4×200 free; 4×100 medley

=== Schedule ===
The following is the competition schedule for the swimming competitions. As with previous editions of the games, the swimming programme schedule occurs in two segments, with the heats, if any, being conducted in the morning, followed by the final events during the evening sessions:

Legend
Key	H	½	F	TF
Value	Heats	Semifinals	Final	Timed final

M = Morning session, E = Evening session

Men
Date →	Jun 6		Jun 7		Jun 8		Jun 9		Jun 10		Jun 11	
Event ↓	M	E	M	E	M	E	M	E	M	E	M	E
50 m freestyle					H	F						
100 m freestyle			H	F								
200 m freestyle	H	F										
400 m freestyle											H	F
1500 m freestyle									F	F		
50 m backstroke											H	F
100 m backstroke	H	F										
200 m backstroke					H	F						
50 m breaststroke											H	F
100 m breaststroke			H	F								
200 m breaststroke	H	F										
50 m butterfly									H	F		
100 m butterfly							H	F				
200 m butterfly					H	F						
200 m individual medley									H	F		
400 m individual medley							H	F				
4×100 m freestyle relay								F				
4×200 m freestyle relay				F								
4×100 m medley relay												F

Women
Date →	Jun 6		Jun 7		Jun 8		Jun 9		Jun 10		Jun 11	
Event ↓	M	E	M	E	M	E	M	E	M	E	M	E
50 m freestyle											H	F
100 m freestyle					H	F						
200 m freestyle							H	F				
400 m freestyle									H	F		
800 m freestyle	F	F										
50 m backstroke					H	F						
100 m backstroke							H	F				
200 m backstroke			H	F								
50 m breaststroke									H	F		
100 m breaststroke					H	F						
200 m breaststroke											H	F
50 m butterfly			H	F								
100 m butterfly											H	F
200 m butterfly							H	F				
200 m individual medley			H	F								
400 m individual medley	H	F										
4×100 m freestyle relay		F										
4×200 m freestyle relay						F						
4×100 m medley relay										F		

== Results ==
Singapore produced its best performance in swimming in the SEA Games, taking more than half of the total gold medals offered. Joseph Schooling and Quah Zheng Wen won ten of these medals and broke nine games records, with Schooling winning all of his events and Quah winning four. Quah and Schooling also combined with their relay teams to games record-breaking wins in all three relays. The women's individual events were dominated by Nguyễn Thị Ánh Viên of Vietnam, who won eight gold medals. The Singaporean women combined to win seven individual events as well as all three relays, breaking the games record in the 4x100 medley.

=== Medal summary ===
Key

* Host nation (Singapore)

Rank	Nation	Gold	Silver	Bronze	Total
1	Singapore (SIN)*	23	12	7	42
2	Vietnam (VIE)	10	2	4	16
3	Malaysia (MAS)	3	4	4	11
4	Thailand (THA)	1	10	5	16
5	Indonesia (INA)	1	8	7	16
6	Philippines (PHI)	0	2	11	13
Totals (6 entries)		38	38	38	114

=== Men ===
Event	Gold		Silver		Bronze	
50 m freestyle	Joseph Isaac Schooling; Singapore	22.47 GR	Napat Wesshasartar; Thailand	23.08	Triady Fauzi Sidiq; Indonesia	23.11
100 m freestyle	Joseph Isaac Schooling; Singapore	48.58 GR	Quah Zheng Wen; Singapore	49.91	Hoàng Quý Phước; Vietnam	50.60
200 m freestyle	Hoàng Quý Phước; Vietnam	1.48.96 GR	Quah Zheng Wen; Singapore	1.49.17 NR	Welson Sim Wee Sheng; Malaysia	1.50.73
400 m freestyle	Welson Sim Wee Sheng; Malaysia	3:53.97 GR	Jessie Khing Lacuna; Philippines	3:55.34	Pang Sheng Jun; Singapore	3:57.60
1500 m freestyle	Lâm Quang Nhật; Vietnam	15.31.03 GR	Aflah Fadlan Prawira; Indonesia	15:38.23 NR	Kevin Yeap Soon Choy; Malaysia	15:55.69
50 m backstroke	Quah Zheng Wen; Singapore	25.27 GR	I Gede Siman Sudartawa; Indonesia	25.34	Kasipat Chograthin; Thailand	25.78
100 m backstroke	Quah Zheng Wen; Singapore	54.51 GR	I Gede Siman Sudartawa; Indonesia	55.60	Trần Duy Khôi; Vietnam	56.31 NR
200 m backstroke	Quah Zheng Wen; Singapore	2:00.55 GR	Trần Duy Khôi; Vietnam	2:02.44 NR	Ricky Anggawidjaja; Indonesia	2:03.03
50 m breaststroke	Indra Gunawan; Indonesia	28.27	Joshua Hall; Philippines	28.32	Wong Fu Kang; Malaysia	28.67
100 m breaststroke	Wong Fu Kang; Malaysia	1:02.46 NR	Radomyos Matjiur; Thailand	1:02.63	Joshua Hall; Philippines	1:02.87
200 m breaststroke	Radomyos Matjiur; Thailand	2:14.83	Lionel Khoo; Singapore	2:16.66 NR	Cheong Ee Hong Christopher; Singapore	2:16.99
50 m butterfly	Joseph Isaac Schooling; Singapore	23.49 GR	Glenn Victor Sutanto; Indonesia	24.12	Quah Zheng Wen; Singapore	24.36
100 m butterfly	Joseph Isaac Schooling; Singapore	52.13 GR	Glenn Victor Sutanto; Indonesia	52.90 NR	Triady Fauzi Sidiq; Indonesia	53.98
200 m butterfly	Joseph Isaac Schooling; Singapore	1:55.73 GR	Quah Zheng Wen; Singapore	1:56.79	Jessie Khing Lacuna; Philippines	2:00.89
200 m individual medley	Joseph Isaac Schooling; Singapore	2:00.66 GR	Quah Zheng Wen; Singapore	2:02.22	Jessie Khing Lacuna; Philippines	2:02.24
400 m individual medley	Quah Zheng Wen; Singapore	4:23.50	Pang Sheng Jun; Singapore	4:24.81	Trần Duy Khôi; Vietnam	4:26.29
4×100 m freestyle relay	Singapore (SIN): Joseph Isaac Schooling (49.74); Danny Yeo Kai Quan (50.56); Clement Lim (49.81); Quah Zheng Wen (49.48)	3:19.59 GR	Malaysia (MAS): Tan Yean Yang Alwyn (51.63); Welson Sim Wee Sheng (51.26); Lim Ching Hwang (51.84); Daniel Bego (50.82)	3:25.55 NR	Indonesia (INA): Triady Fauzi Sidiq (51.28); Alexis Wijaya Ohmar (52.04); Ricky Anggawidjaja (51.58); Glenn Victor Sutanto (51.02)	3:25.92
4×200 m freestyle relay	Singapore (SIN): Joseph Isaac Schooling (1:47.79 GR); Danny Yeo Kai Quan (1:50.45); Pang Sheng Jun (1:51.33); Quah Zheng Wen (1:48.57)	7:18.14 GR	Malaysia (MAS): Daniel Bego (1:53.01); Welson Sim Wee Sheng (1:51.23); Lim Ching Hwang (1:52.04); Yeap Soon Choy Kevin (1:53.85)	7:30.13	Indonesia (INA): Triady Fauzi Sidiq (1:54.28); Ricky Anggawijaya (1:54.44); Aflah Fadlan Prawira (1:53.35); Satrio Bagaskara Gunadi Putra (1:53.56)	7:35.63
4×100 m medley relay	Singapore (SIN): Quah Zheng Wen (54.81); Lionel Khoo (1:02.33); Joseph Isaac Schooling (51.50); Clement Lim (49.61)	3:38.25 GR	Indonesia (INA): I Gede Siman Sudartawa (55.78); Indra Gunawan (1:02.18); Glenn Victor Sutanto (53.33); Triady Fauzi Sidiq (50.81)	3:42.10	Thailand (THA): Kasipat Chograthin (57.77); Radomyos Matjiur (1:01.95); Navaphat Wongcharoen (55.38); Napat Wesshasartar (50.57)	3:45.67
AS Asian record | GR Games record | WR World record NR National record (Any world record is necessarily also a games, Asian, and national record. Asian records are also games and national records.)

=== Women ===
Event	Gold		Silver		Bronze	
50 m freestyle	Lim Xiang Qi Amanda; Singapore	25.59 GR	Quah Ting Wen; Singapore	25.60	Jasmine Alkhaldi; Philippines	25.79
100 m freestyle	Quah Ting Wen; Singapore	55.93 GR	Nguyễn Thị Ánh Viên; Vietnam	56.05 NR	Jasmine Alkhaldi; Philippines	56.10
200 m freestyle	Nguyễn Thị Ánh Viên; Vietnam	1:59.27 GR	Natthanan Junkrajang; Thailand	2:00.54	Jasmine Alkhaldi; Philippines	2:00.84
400 m freestyle	Nguyễn Thị Ánh Viên; Vietnam	4:08.66 GR	Khoo Cai Lin; Malaysia	4:17.79	Ammiga Himathongkom; Thailand	4:20.20
800 m freestyle	Nguyễn Thị Ánh Viên; Vietnam	8:34.85 GR	Ammiga Himathongkom; Thailand	8:52.99	Benjaporn Sriphanomthorn; Thailand	8:56.39
50 m backstroke	Tao Li; Singapore	28.90 GR	Shana Lim Jia Yi; Singapore	29.36	Nguyễn Thị Ánh Viên; Vietnam	29.40
100 m backstroke	Tao Li; Singapore	1:02.67	Anak Agung Istri Kania Ratih Atmaja; Indonesia	1:04.38 NR	Roxanne Ashley Yu; Philippines	1:04.80
200 m backstroke	Nguyễn Thị Ánh Viên; Vietnam	2:14.12 GR	Yessy Venisia Yosaputra; Indonesia	2:17.17	Roxanne Ashley Yu; Philippines	2:18.45
50 m breaststroke	Roanne Ho; Singapore	31.45 GR	Phee Jinq En; Malaysia	32.46	Erika Kong Chia Chia; Malaysia	32.58
100 m breaststroke	Phee Jinq En; Malaysia	1:10.47	Roanne Ho; Singapore	1:11.78	Samantha Louisa Ginn Yeo; Singapore	1:11.87
200 m breaststroke	Nguyễn Thị Ánh Viên; Vietnam	2:31.16	Phiangkhwan Pawapotako; Thailand	2:31.51	Samantha Louisa Ginn Yeo; Singapore	2:35.60
50 m butterfly	Tao Li; Singapore	26.58 GR	Quah Ting Wen; Singapore	27.02	Jasmine Alkhaldi; Philippines	27.47
100 m butterfly	Tao Li; Singapore	59.79	Quah Ting Wen; Singapore	1:00.30	Jasmine Alkhaldi; Philippines	1:01.00
200 m butterfly	Nguyễn Thị Ánh Viên; Vietnam	2:11.12 GR	Quah Ting Wen; Singapore	2:14.50	Sutasinee Pankaew; Thailand	2:14.51
200 m individual medley	Nguyễn Thị Ánh Viên; Vietnam	2:13.53 GR	Phiangkhwan Pawapotako; Thailand	2:18.56	Yeo Ginn Samantha Louisa; Singapore	2:18.77
400 m individual medley	Nguyễn Thị Ánh Viên; Vietnam	4:42.88 GR	Phiangkhwan Pawapotako; Thailand	4:52.63	Quah Jing Wen; Singapore	4:59.52
4×100 m freestyle relay	Singapore (SIN): Nur Marina Chan Si Min (58.07); Lim Xiang Qi Amanda (56.13); Hoong En Qi (56.41); Quah Ting Wen (55.99)	3:46.60	Thailand (THA): Jenjira Srisa-Ard (58.25); Kornkarnjana Sapianchai (56.92); Benjaporn Sriphanomthorn (57.97); Natthanan Junkrajang (56.48)	3:49.62	Indonesia (INA): Patricia Yosita Hapsari (57.99); Kathriana Mella Gustianjani (58.79); Sagita Putri Krisdewanti (58.01); Ressa Kania Dewi (58.39)	3:53.18
4×200 m freestyle relay	Singapore (SIN): Chue Mun Ee Christie May (2:04.63); Lim Xiang Qi Amanda (2:04.40); Tseng Wei Wen Rachel (2:04.02); Quah Ting Wen (1:59.90)	8:12.95	Thailand (THA): Kornkarnjana Sapianchai (2:04.36); Patarawadee Kittiya (2:03.93); Benjaporn Sriphanomthorn (2:03.20); Natthanan Junkrajang (2:01.94)	8:13.43	Indonesia (INA): Sagita Putri Krisdewanti (2:05.95); Ressa Kania Dewi (2:06.79); Kathriana Mella Gustianjani (2:09.67); Patricia Yosita Hapsari (2:08.56)	8:30.97 NR
4×100 m medley relay	Singapore (SIN): Tao Li (1:03.56); Roanne Ho (1:09.66); Quah Ting Wen (59.18); Lim Xiang Qi Amanda (56.32)	4:08.72 GR	Thailand (THA): Araya Wongvat (1:04.61); Phiangkhwan Pawapotako (1:11.70); Patarawadee Kittiya (1:01.32); Natthanan Junkrajang (55.17)	4:12.80	Philippines (PHI): Roxanne Ashley Yu (1:05.32); Imelda Corazon Wistey (1:14.36); Hannah Dato (1:01.28); Jasmine Alkhaldi (55.23)	4:16.19
AS Asian record | GR Games record | WR World record NR National record (Any world record is necessarily also a games, Asian, and national record. Asian records are also games and national records.)

== Records broken ==
=== Men ===
Event	Date	Round	Name	Nationality	Time	Record	Day
Men's 100 m backstroke	6 June	Final	Quah Zheng Wen	Singapore	54.51	GR	1
Men's 100 m freestyle	7 June	Final	Joseph Isaac Schooling	Singapore	48.58	GR	2
Men's 200 m freestyle	6 June	Final	Hoàng Quý Phước	Vietnam	1.48.96	GR	1
Men's 200 m freestyle	7 June	Final^{1}	Joseph Isaac Schooling	Singapore	1:47.79	GR	2
Men's 4 × 200 m freestyle relay	7 June	Final	Joseph Isaac Schooling (1:47.79); Yeo Kai Quan Danny (1:50.45); Pang Sheng Jun (1:51.33); Quah Zheng Wen (1:48.57)	Singapore	7:18.14	GR	2
Men's 50 m freestyle	8 June	Final	Joseph Isaac Schooling	Singapore	22.47	GR	3
Men's 200 m backstroke	8 June	Final	Quah Zheng Wen	Singapore	2:00.55	GR	3
Men's 200 m butterfly	8 June	Final	Joseph Isaac Schooling	Singapore	1:55.73	GR	3
Men's 100 m butterfly	9 June	Final	Joseph Isaac Schooling	Singapore	52.13	GR	4
Men's 4 × 100 m freestyle relay	9 June	Final	Joseph Isaac Schooling (49.74); Yeo Kai Quan Danny (50.56); Lim Yong'En Clement (49.81); Quah Zheng Wen (49.48)	Singapore	3:19.59	GR	4
Men's 50 m butterfly	10 June	Final	Joseph Isaac Schooling	Singapore	23.49	GR	5
Men's 1500 m freestyle	10 June	Final	Lâm Quang Nhật	Vietnam	15.31.03	GR	5
Men's 200 m individual medley	10 June	Final	Joseph Isaac Schooling	Singapore	2:00.66	GR	5
Men's 50 m backstroke	11 June	Final	Quah Zheng Wen	Singapore	25.27	GR	6
Men's 400 m freestyle	11 June	Final	Welson Sim Wee Sheng	Malaysia	3:53.97	GR	6
Men's 4 × 100 m medley relay	11 June	Final	Quah Zheng Wen (54.81); Lionel Khoo (1:02.33); Joseph Isaac Schooling (51.50); Lim Yong'En Clement (49.61)	Singapore	3:38.25	GR	6

1. Record was set during the Men's 4 × 200 m freestyle relay

=== Women ===
Event	Date	Round	Name	Nationality	Time	Record	Day
Women's 400 m individual medley	6 June	Heats	Nguyễn Thị Ánh Viên	Vietnam	4:43.93	GR	1
Women's 800 m freestyle	6 June	Final	Nguyễn Thị Ánh Viên	Vietnam	8:34.85	GR	1
Women's 400 m individual medley	6 June	Final	Nguyễn Thị Ánh Viên	Vietnam	4:42.88	GR	1
Women's 50 m butterfly	7 June	Final	Tao Li	Singapore	26.58	GR	2
Women's 200 m backstroke	7 June	Final	Nguyễn Thị Ánh Viên	Vietnam	2:14.12	GR	2
Women's 200 m individual medley	7 June	Final	Nguyễn Thị Ánh Viên	Vietnam	2:13.53	GR	2
Women's 50 m backstroke	8 June	Final	Tao Li	Singapore	28.90	GR	3
Women's 100 m freestyle	8 June	Final	Quah Ting Wen	Singapore	55.93	GR	3
Women's 200 m butterfly	9 June	Final	Nguyễn Thị Ánh Viên	Vietnam	2:11.12	GR	4
Women's 200 m freestyle	9 June	Final	Nguyễn Thị Ánh Viên	Vietnam	1:59.27	GR	4
Women's 50 m breaststroke	10 June	Final	Ho Ru'En Roanne	Singapore	31.45	GR	5
Women's 400 m freestyle	10 June	Final	Nguyễn Thị Ánh Viên	Vietnam	4:08.66	GR	5
Women's 4 × 100 m medley relay	10 June	Final	Tao Li (1:03.56); Ho Ru'En Roanne (1:09.66); Quah Ting Wen (59.18); Lim Xiang Qi Amanda (56.32)	Singapore	4:08.72	GR	5
Women's 50 m freestyle	11 June	Final	Lim Xiang Qi Amanda	Singapore	25.59	GR	6

== See also ==
- Swimming at the 2015 ASEAN Para Games
