= Swimming at the 2015 SEA Games – Men's 50 metre backstroke =

Swimming – Men's 50 metre backstroke at the 2015 SEA Games
- Venue: OCBC Aquatic Centre
- Date: 11 June 2015
- Competitors: 12 from 8 nations

Medalists
| gold medal | Quah Zheng Wen | Singapore |
| silver medal | I Gede Siman Sudartawa | Indonesia |
| bronze medal | Kasipat Chograthin | Thailand |

The men's 50 metre backstroke competition of the swimming event at the 2015 SEA Games was held on 11 June at the OCBC Aquatic Centre in Kallang, Singapore.

== Records ==
Prior to this competition, the existing Asian and Games records were as follows:

| Asian record | Junya Koga (JPN) | 24.24 | Rome, Italy | 2 August 2009 |
| Games record | I Gede Siman Sudartawa (INA) | 25.62 | Palembang, Indonesia | 16 November 2011 |

The following records were established during the competition:

| Date | Event | Name | Nationality | Time | Record |
|---|---|---|---|---|---|
| 11 June | Final | Quah Zheng Wen | Singapore (SIN) | 25.27 | GR |

== Schedule ==
All times are Singapore Standard Time (UTC+08:00)

| Date | Time | Event |
|---|---|---|
| Thursday, 11 June 2015 | 09:04 | Heat 1 |
| Thursday, 11 June 2015 | 09:05 | Heat 2 |
| Thursday, 11 June 2015 | 19:38 | Final |

== Results ==
| KEY: | Q | Qualified | GR | Games record | NR | National record | PB | Personal best | SB | Seasonal best | WD | Withdrew | DNF | Did not finish |

=== Heats ===
Source: Heats results summary

The heats were held on 11 June.

==== Heat 1 ====
Source: Heat 1 results

Heat 1 was held on 11 June.

| Rank | Lane | Athletes | Time | Notes |
|---|---|---|---|---|
| 1 | 4 | Quah Zheng Wen (SIN) | 26.41 | Q |
| 2 | 3 | Zach Ong Wei Shien (SIN) | 26.59 | Q |
| 3 | 6 | Thanapoom Krueakhamkhao (THA) | 26.95 | Q |
| 4 | 5 | Tern Jian Han (MAS) | 27.11 | Q |
| 5 | 2 | Thoeun Thol (CAM) | 31.63 | |
| 6 | 7 | Cheng Pirort (CAM) | 32.58 | |

==== Heat 2 ====
Source: Heat 2 results

Heat 2 was held on 11 June.

| Rank | Lane | Athletes | Time | Notes |
|---|---|---|---|---|
| 1 | 4 | I Gede Siman Sudartawa (INA) | 25.86 | Q |
| 2 | 5 | Kasipat Chograthin (THA) | 26.17 | Q |
| 3 | 3 | Trần Duy Khôi (VIE) | 26.73 | Q |
| 4 | 6 | Ricky Anggawidjaja (INA) | 26.88 | Q |
| 5 | 2 | Axel Toni Steven Ngui (PHI) | 27.61 | |
| 6 | 7 | Myat Thint (MYA) | 31.38 | |

=== Final ===
Source: Final Results

The final was held on 11 June.

| Rank | Lane | Athletes | Time | Notes |
|---|---|---|---|---|
| 1st place, gold medalist(s) | 3 | Quah Zheng Wen (SIN) | 25.27 | GR |
| 2nd place, silver medalist(s) | 4 | I Gede Siman Sudartawa (INA) | 25.34 | NR |
| 3rd place, bronze medalist(s) | 5 | Kasipat Chograthin (THA) | 25.78 | |
| 4 | 2 | Trần Duy Khôi (VIE) | 26.13 | |
| 5 | 8 | Tern Jian Han (MAS) | 26.19 | |
| 6 | 6 | Zach Ong Wei Shien (SIN) | 26.26 | |
| 7 | 7 | Ricky Anggawidjaja (INA) | 26.49 | |
| 8 | 1 | Thanapoom Krueakhamkhao (THA) | 26.66 | |
