= Swimming at the 2015 SEA Games – Men's 400 metre freestyle =

Swimming – Men's 400 metre freestyle at the 2015 SEA Games
- Venue: OCBC Aquatic Centre
- Date: 11 June 2015
- Competitors: 13 from 7 nations

Medalists
gold medal	Welson Sim Wee Sheng	Malaysia
silver medal	Jessie Khing Lacuna	Philippines
bronze medal	Pang Sheng Jun	Singapore

The men's 400 metre freestyle competition of the swimming event at the 2015 SEA Games was held on 11 June at the OCBC Aquatic Centre in Kallang, Singapore.

== Records ==
Prior to this competition, the existing Asian and Games records were as follows:

Asian record	Sun Yang (CHN)	3:40.14	London, Great Britain	28 July 2012
Games record	Daniel William Henry Bego (MAS)	3:53.99	Vientiane, Laos	12 December 2009

The following records were established during the competition:

Date	Event	Name	Nationality	Time	Record
11 June	Final	Welson Sim Wee Sheng	Malaysia (MAS)	3:53.97	GR

== Schedule ==
All times are Singapore Standard Time (UTC+08:00)

Date	Time	Event
Thursday, 11 June 2015	09:12	Heat 1
Thursday, 11 June 2015	09:16	Heat 2
Thursday, 11 June 2015	19:48	Final

== Results ==
KEY:	Q	Qualified	GR	Games record	NR	National record	PB	Personal best	SB	Seasonal best	WD	Withdrew	DNF	Did not finish

=== Heats ===
Source: Heats results summary

The heats were held on 11 June.

==== Heat 1 ====
Source: Heat 1 results

Heat 1 was held on 11 June.

Rank	Lane	Athletes	Time	Notes
1	3	Pang Sheng Jun (SIN)	4:03.64	Q
2	4	Daniel William Henry Bego (MAS)	4:06.05	Q
3	5	Hoàng Quý Phước (VIE)	4:06.71	Q
4	7	Jose Joaquin Gonzalez (PHI)	4:09.07	
5	2	Satrio Bagaskara Gunadi Putra (INA)	4:09.27	
6	6	Sarit Tiewong (THA)	4:09.38	

==== Heat 2 ====
Source: Heat 2 results

Heat 2 was held on 11 June.

Rank	Lane	Athletes	Time	Notes
1	4	Welson Sim Wee Sheng (MAS)	4:02.46	Q
2	7	Jessie Khing Lacuna (PHI)	4:03.13	Q
3	6	Aflah Fadlan Prawira (INA)	4:03.60	Q
4	3	Tanakrit Kittiya (THA)	4:04.14	Q
5	5	Yeo Kai Quan (SIN)	4:04.84	Q
6	2	Lâm Quang Nhật (VIE)	4:15.63	
7	1	Pou Sovijja (CAM)	4:21.57	

=== Final ===
Source: Final Results

The final was held on 11 June.

Rank	Lane	Athletes	Time	Notes
1st place, gold medalist(s)	4	Welson Sim Wee Sheng (MAS)	3:53.97	GR
2nd place, silver medalist(s)	5	Jessie Khing Lacuna (PHI)	3:55.34	
3rd place, bronze medalist(s)	6	Pang Sheng Jun (SIN)	3:57.60	
4	1	Daniel William Henry Bego (MAS)	3:58.34	
5	8	Hoàng Quý Phước (VIE)	3:58.99	
6	2	Tanakrit Kittiya (THA)	3:59.13	
7	3	Aflah Fadlan Prawira (INA)	4:01.62	
8	7	Yeo Kai Quan (SIN)	4:04.64	
