= Swimming at the 2015 SEA Games – Women's 100 metre backstroke =

Swimming – Women's 100 metre backstroke at the 2015 SEA Games
- Venue: OCBC Aquatic Centre
- Date: 9 June 2015
- Competitors: 10 from 7 nations

Medalists
gold medal	Tao Li	Singapore
silver medal	Anak Agung Istri Kania Ratih	Indonesia
bronze medal	Roxanne Ashley Yu	Philippines

The women's 100 metre backstroke competition of the swimming event at the 2015 SEA Games was held on 9 June at the OCBC Aquatic Centre in Kallang, Singapore.

== Records ==
Prior to this competition, the existing Asian and Games records were as follows:

Asian record	Aya Terakawa (JPN)	58.70	Barcelona, Spain	4 August 2013
Games record	Tao Li (SIN)	1:02.11	Palembang, Indonesia	16 December 2011

== Schedule ==
All times are Singapore Standard Time (UTC+08:00)

Date	Time	Event
Tuesday, 9 June 2015	09:09	Heat 1
Tuesday, 9 June 2015	09:10	Heat 2
Tuesday, 9 June 2015	19:40	Final

== Results ==
KEY:	Q	Qualified	GR	Games record	NR	National record	PB	Personal best	SB	Seasonal best	WD	Withdrew	DNF	Did not finish

=== Heats ===
Source: Heats results summary

The heats were held on 9 June.

==== Heat 1 ====
Source: Heat 1 results

Heat 1 was held on 9 June.

Rank	Lane	Athletes	Time	Notes
1	6	Quek Jia Hui Hannah (SIN)	1:05.69	Q
2	4	Tao Li (SIN)	1:05.94	Q
3	5	Parita Damrongrat (THA)	1:06.41	Q
4	3	Anak Agung Istri Kania Ratih (INA)	1:06.76	Q
5	2	Caroline Chan Zi Xin (MAS)	1:08.14	

==== Heat 2 ====
Source: Heat 2 results

Heat 2 was held on 9 June.

Rank	Lane	Athletes	Time	Notes
1	6	Roxanne Ashley Yu (PHI)	1:05.03	Q
2	5	Araya Wongvat (THA)	1:05.38	Q
3	3	Yessy Venesia Yosaputra (INA)	1:05.65	Q
4	2	Elizabeth Ann Jordana (PHI)	1:05.66	Q
5	7	Seng Samphors (CAM)	1:18.43	

=== Final ===
Source: Final Results

The final was held on 9 June.

Rank	Lane	Athletes	Time	Notes
1st place, gold medalist(s)	7	Tao Li (SIN)	1:02.67	
2nd place, silver medalist(s)	8	Anak Agung Istri Kania Ratih (INA)	1:04.38	NR
3rd place, bronze medalist(s)	4	Roxanne Ashley Yu (PHI)	1:04.80	
4	3	Yessy Venesia Yosaputra (INA)	1:05.18	
5	5	Araya Wongvat (THA)	1:05.31	
6	2	Quek Jia Hui Hannah (SIN)	1:05.83	
7	1	Parita Damrongrat (THA)	1:05.85	
8	6	Elizabeth Ann Jordana (PHI)	1:05.94	
