= Swimming at the 2015 SEA Games – Men's 400 metre individual medley =

Swimming – Men's 400 metre individual medley at the 2015 SEA Games
- Venue: OCBC Aquatic Centre
- Date: 9 June 2015
- Competitors: 7 from 5 nations

Medalists
gold medal	Quah Zheng Wen	Singapore
silver medal	Pang Sheng Jun	Singapore
bronze medal	Trần Duy Khôi	Vietnam

The men's 400 metre individual medley competition of the swimming event at the 2015 SEA Games was held on 9 June at the OCBC Aquatic Centre in Kallang, Singapore.

== Records ==
Prior to this competition, the existing Asian and Games records were as follows:

Asian record	Kosuke Hagino (JPN)	4:07.61	Niigata, Japan	11 April 2013
Games record	Ratapong Sirisanont (THA)	4:23.20	Ho Chi Minh City, Vietnam	6 December 2003

== Schedule ==
Date	Time	Event
Tuesday, 9 June 2015	19:53	Final

== Results ==
KEY:	Q	Qualified	GR	Games record	NR	National record	PB	Personal best	SB	Seasonal best	WD	Withdrew	DNF	Did not finish

=== Final ===
Source: Results Final

The final was held on 9 June.

Rank	Lane	Athletes	Time	Notes
1st place, gold medalist(s)	5	Quah Zheng Wen (SIN)	4:23.50	
2nd place, silver medalist(s)	3	Pang Sheng Jun (SIN)	4:24.81	
3rd place, bronze medalist(s)	4	Trần Duy Khôi (VIE)	4:26.29	
4	2	Aflah Fadlan Prawira (INA)	4:29.79	
5	1	Jose Joaquin Gonzalez (PHI)	4:31.37	
6	6	Jiarapong Sangkhawat (THA)	4:36.57	
7	7	Muhammad Hamgari (INA)	4:39.02	
