= Swimming at the 2013 SEA Games =

27th SEA Games
- Host city: (Myanmar) Naypyidaw
- Date: 12–16 December 2013
- Venue: Wunna Theikdi Aquatics Centre
- Nations: 9
- Events: 32

Swimming at the 2013 SEA Games took place at the Wunna Theikdi Aquatics Centre, Naypyidaw, Myanmar from 12 to 16 December 2013. This Aquatics discipline had 32 long course events: 16 for males and 16 for females.

The winning team Singapore collected around a third of overall gold medals in 2013 SEA Games just from swimming competitions.

== Event schedule ==
The 2013 Southeast Asian Games featured a prelims/finals format in all events, save the women's 800 free, 200 backstroke, 400 m I.M., 4x100 Free Relay, 4x200 Free Relay, 4x100 Medley Relay and the men's 1500 free, 4x100 Free Relay, 4x200 Free Relay, 4x100 Medley Relay which were timed final (i.e. all swimmers only swum once). Prelim sessions begin at 9:00 a.m., final sessions begin at 6:00 p.m.

Type		Men	Women
Backstroke	100 m	14 Dec	
Backstroke	200 m	12 Dec	
Breaststroke	100 m	13 Dec	
Breaststroke	200 m	15 Dec	
Butterfly	100 m	14 Dec	
Butterfly	200 m	16 Dec	
Freestyle	50 m	15 Dec	16 Dec
Freestyle	100 m	13 Dec	12 Dec
Freestyle	200 m	16 Dec	15 Dec
Freestyle	400 m	14 Dec	13 Dec
Freestyle	800 m (W); 1500 m (M)	15 Dec	14 Dec
Individual Medley	200 m	13 Dec	12 Dec
Individual Medley	400 m	12 Dec	16 Dec
Freestyle Relay	4x100 m	14 Dec	13 Dec
Freestyle Relay	4x200 m	12 Dec	
Medley Relay	4x100 m	16 Dec	15 Dec

== Medalists ==
=== Men ===
Event	Gold		Silver		Bronze	
50 m freestyle	Triady Fauzi Sidiq; Indonesia	23.12	Russell Ong; Singapore	23.14	Gavin Alexander Lewis; Thailand	23.41
100 m freestyle	Triady Fauzi Sidiq; Indonesia	49.99 GR	Hoàng Quý Phước; Vietnam	50.52	Danny Yeo; Singapore	50.83
200 m freestyle	Hoàng Quý Phước; Vietnam	1:50.64	Daniel Bego; Malaysia	1:51.10	Quah Zheng Wen; Singapore	1:51.66
400 m freestyle	Daniel Bego; Malaysia	3:54.89	Hoàng Quý Phước; Vietnam	3:57.73	Tanakrit Kittaya; Thailand	3:59.00
1500 m freestyle	Lâm Quang Nhật; Vietnam	15:39.44	Kevin Yeap; Malaysia	15:45.89	Welson Sim; Malaysia	15:57.98
100 m backstroke	I Gede Siman Sudartawa; Indonesia	55.80	Quah Zheng Wen; Singapore	56.11	Ricky Anggawijaya; Indonesia	57.27
200 m backstroke	Ricky Anggawijaya; Indonesia	2:03.44	I Gede Siman Sudartawa; Indonesia	2:04.10	Zach Ong; Singapore	2:05.38
100 m breaststroke	Radomyos Matjiur; Thailand	1:03.06	Indra Gunawan; Indonesia	1:03.18	Joshua Hall; Philippines	1:03.32
200 m breaststroke	Nuttapong Ketin; Thailand	2:13.32	Radomyos Matjiur; Thailand	2:17.77	Yap See Tuan; Malaysia	2:18.57
100 m butterfly	Joseph Schooling; Singapore	52.67 GR	Triady Fauzi Sidiq; Indonesia	53.14	Glenn Victor Sutanto; Indonesia	53.93
200 m butterfly	Joseph Schooling; Singapore	1:59.46	Quah Zheng Wen; Singapore	2:01.65	Matt Louis Navata; Philippines	2:04.20
200 m individual medley	Joseph Schooling; Singapore	2:00.82 GR	Trần Duy Khôi; Vietnam	2:03.81	Nuttapong Ketin; Thailand	2:05.06
400 m individual medley	Quah Zheng Wen; Singapore	4:23.45	Nuttapong Ketin; Thailand	4:23.63	Trần Duy Khôi; Vietnam	4:25.34
4×100 m freestyle relay	Singapore; Clement Lim; Danny Yeo Kai Quan; Darren Lim; Joseph Schooling	3:21.74 GR	Malaysia; Lim Ching Hwang; Welson Sim; Vernon Lee; Daniel Bego	3:26.98	Thailand; Napat Wesshasartar; Papungkorn Ingkanont; Cholawat Phoduang; Sarit Tiewong	3:27.17
4×200 m freestyle relay	Singapore; Joseph Schooling; Danny Yeo Kai Quan; Pang Sheng Jun; Quah Zheng Wen	7:26.67 GR	Malaysia; Lim Ching Hwang; Kevin Yeap; Daniel Bego; Welson Sim	7:27.32	Indonesia; Triady Fauzi Sidiq; Putera Muhammad Randa; Alexis Wijaya Ohmar; Ricky Anggawijaya	7:35.13
4×100 m medley relay	Singapore; Quah Zheng Wen; Christopher Cheong; Joseph Schooling; Clement Lim	3:43.62	Thailand; Kasipat Chograthin; Radomyos Matjiur; Supakrid Pananuratana; Cholawat Phoduang	3:47.94	Malaysia; Tern Jian Han; Yap Kah Choon; Daniel Bego; Lim Ching Hwang	3:48.74

=== Women ===
Event	Gold		Silver		Bronze	
50 m freestyle	Amanda Lim; Singapore	25.69 GR	Natthanan Junkrajang; Thailand	25.80	Jenjira Srisaard; Thailand	25.90
100 m freestyle	Natthanan Junkrajang; Thailand	56.23	Quah Ting Wen; Singapore	56.54	Jasmine Alkhaldi; Philippines	56.63
200 m freestyle	Natthanan Junkrajang; Thailand	2:01.03	Quah Ting Wen; Singapore	2:01.74	Lynette Lim; Singapore	2:02.62
400 m freestyle	Benjaporn Sriphanomthorn; Thailand	4:14.23	Nguyễn Thị Ánh Viên; Vietnam	4:16.06	Lynette Lim; Singapore	4:21.24
800 m freestyle	Khoo Cai Lin; Malaysia	8:49.51	Benjaporn Sriphanomthorn; Thailand	8:49.61	Nguyễn Thị Ánh Viên; Vietnam	8:52.77
100 m backstroke	Tao Li; Singapore	1:02.47	Nguyen Thi Anh Vien; Vietnam	1:02.76	Natthanan Junkrajang; Thailand	1:04.03
200 m backstroke	Nguyen Thi Anh Vien; Vietnam	2:14.80 GR	Yessy Venisia Yosaputra; Indonesia	2:20.35	Meagan Lim; Singapore	2:21.19
100 m breaststroke	Christina Loh; Malaysia	1:10.55	Chavunnooch Salubluek; Thailand	1:11.35	Phiangkhwan Pawapotako; Thailand	1:12.68
200 m breaststroke	Christina Loh; Malaysia	2:32.56	Chavunnooch Salubluek; Thailand	2:34.21	Samantha Yeo; Singapore	2:34.27
100 m butterfly	Tao Li; Singapore	59.87	Quah Ting Wen; Singapore	1:00.34	Jasmine Alkhaldi; Philippines	1:01.76
200 m butterfly	Patarawadee Kittiya; Thailand	2:13.83	Quah Ting Wen; Singapore	2:14.42	Tao Li; Singapore	2:14.51
200 m individual medley	Nguyễn Thị Ánh Viên; Vietnam	2:16.20	Phiangkhwan Pawapotako; Thailand	2:17.59	Meagan Lim; Singapore	2:20.38
400 m individual medley	Nguyễn Thị Ánh Viên; Vietnam	4:46.16 GR	Ressa Kania Dewi; Indonesia	4:59.49	Meagan Lim; Singapore	5:01.74
4×100 m freestyle relay	Thailand; Jenjira Srisaard (57.73); Patarawadee Kittaya (57.77); Benjaporn Sriphanomthorn (56.36); Natthanan Junkrajang (55.80)	3:47.66	Singapore; Quah Ting Wen (56.91); Amanda Lim (57.40); Mylene Ong (57.13); Lynette Lim (57.56)	3:49.00	Indonesia; Ressa Kania Dewi (58.06); Kathriana Mella Gustianjani (59.02); Raina Saumi Grahana (58.95); Patricia Yosita Hapsari (59.25)	3:55.28
4×200 m freestyle relay	Singapore; Quah Ting Wen (2:02.51); Lynette Lim (2:02.79); Amanda Lim (2:04.28); Tao Li (2:04.41)	8:13.99	Indonesia; Raina Saumi Grahana (2:09.21); Kathriana Mella Gustianjani (2:13.10); Patricia Yosita Hapsari (2:14.66); Ressa Kania Dewi (2:06.83)	8:43.80	Myanmar; Khant Su San Khant (2:19.37); Moe Theint San Su (2:19.32); K Zin Win (2:21.91); Ei Thet Ei (2:22.94)	9:23.54
4×100 m medley relay	Singapore; Tao Li (1:03.56); Samantha Yeo (1:12.42); Quah Ting Wen (1:00.84); Amanda Lim (56.20)	4:13.02	Thailand; Natthanan Junkrajang (1:04.77); Chavunnooch Salubluek (1:11.98); Supasuta Sounthornchote (1:02.05); Benjaporn Sriphanomthorn (56.72)	4:15.52	Malaysia; Erika Kong (1:07.90); Christina Loh (1:09.94); Yap Siew Hui (1:00.84); Khoo Cai Lin (59.09)	4:17.77

== Medal table ==
* Host nation (Myanmar)

Rank	Nation	Gold	Silver	Bronze	Total
1	Singapore	12	8	10	30
2	Thailand	7	9	7	23
3	Vietnam	5	5	2	12
4	Indonesia	4	6	4	14
5	Malaysia	4	4	4	12
6	Philippines	0	0	4	4
7	Myanmar*	0	0	1	1
Totals (7 entries)		32	32	32	96

== Records broken ==
=== Men ===
Event	Date	Round	Name	Nationality	Time	Record	Day
Men's 4 × 200 m freestyle	12 December	Final	Joseph Schooling (1:50.86); Danny Yeo (1:50.72); Pang Sheng Jun (1:53.17); Quah Zheng Wen (1:51.92)	Singapore (SIN)	7:26.67	GR	1
Men's 100 m freestyle	13 December	Final	Triady Fauzi Sidiq	Indonesia (INA)	49.99	GR	2
Men's 200 m individual medley	13 December	Final	Joseph Schooling	Singapore (SIN)	2:00.82	GR	2
Men's 100 m butterfly	14 December	Final	Joseph Schooling	Singapore (SIN)	52.67	GR	3
Men's 4 × 100 m freestyle	14 December	Final	Clement Lim (50.68); Danny Yeo (50.57); Darren Lim (50.77); Joseph Schooling (49.72)	Singapore (SIN)	3:21.74	GR	3

=== Women ===
Event	Date	Round	Name	Nationality	Time	Record	Day
Women's 200 m backstroke	12 December	Final	Nguyen Thi Anh Vien	Vietnam (VIE)	2:14.80	GR	1
Women's 400 m individual medley	16 December	Final	Nguyen Thi Anh Vien	Vietnam (VIE)	4:46.16	GR	5
Women's 50 m freestyle	16 December	Final	Amanda Lim	Singapore (SIN)	25.69	GR	5
