= Swimming at the 2015 SEA Games – Men's 100 metre backstroke =

Swimming – Men's 100 metre backstroke at the 2015 SEA Games
- Venue: OCBC Aquatic Centre, Singapore Sports Hub
- Dates: 6 June 2015
- Competitors: 11 from 8 nations

Medalists
gold medal	Quah Zheng Wen	Singapore
silver medal	I Gede Siman Sudartawa	Indonesia
bronze medal	Trần Duy Khôi	Vietnam

The Men's 100 metre backstroke event at the 2015 SEA Games took place on 6 June 2015 at the OCBC Aquatic Centre in the Singapore Sports Hub.

There were 11 competitors from eight countries who took part in this event. Two heats were held. The heat in which a swimmer competed did not formally matter for advancement, as the swimmers with the top eight times from both field qualified for the finals.

== Schedule ==
All times are Singapore Standard Time (UTC+08:00)

Date	Time	Event
Saturday, 6 June 2015	09:16	Heats
Saturday, 6 June 2015	19:49	Final

== Records ==
Prior to this competition, the existing world, Asian, and Southeast Asian Games records were as follows.

World Record	Aaron Peirsol (USA)	51.94	Indianapolis, United States	8 July 2009
Asian Record	Ryosuke Irie (JPN)	52.24	Kumamoto, Japan	5 September 2009
Games Record	I Gede Siman Sudartawa (INA)	55.59	Palembang, Indonesia	15 November 2011

The following records were established during the competition:

Date	Event	Name	Nationality	Time	Record
6 June	Final	Quah Zheng Wen	Singapore	54.51	GR

== Results ==
=== Heats ===
Rank	Heat	Lane	Athlete	Time	Notes
1	2	4	I Gede Siman Sudartawa (INA)	58.11	Q
2	2	5	Trần Duy Khôi (VIE)	58.24	Q
3	2	3	Ricky Anggawijaya (INA)	58.25	Q
4	1	4	Quah Zheng Wen (SIN)	58.84	Q
5	1	5	Ong Wei Shien Zach (SIN)	58.95	Q
6	1	3	Tern Jian Han (MAS)	59.02	Q
7	2	2	Kasipat Chograthin (THA)	59.04	Q
8	2	6	Jose Joaquin Gonzalez (PHI)	59.45	Q
9	1	6	Supakrid Pananuratana (THA)	1:00.29	
10	1	2	Thint Myat (MYA)	1:09.86	
11	2	7	Pirort Cheng (CAM)	1:12.47	

=== Final ===
Rank	Lane	Athlete	Time	Notes
1st place, gold medalist(s)	6	Quah Zheng Wen (SIN)	54.51	GR
2nd place, silver medalist(s)	4	I Gede Siman Sudartawa (INA)	55.60	
3rd place, bronze medalist(s)	5	Trần Duy Khôi (VIE)	56.31	
4	3	Ricky Anggawijaya (INA)	57.28	
5	7	Tern Jian Han (MAS)	57.30	
6	1	Kasipat Chograthin (THA)	57.48	NR
7	2	Ong Wei Shien Zach (SIN)	57.71	
8	8	Jose Joaquin Gonzalez (PHI)	59.83	
