= Swimming at the 2015 SEA Games – Women's 50 metre backstroke =

Swimming – Women's 50 metre backstroke at the 2015 SEA Games
- Venue: OCBC Aquatic Centre
- Date: 8 June 2015
- Competitors: 10 from 7 nations

Medalists
gold medal	Tao Li	Singapore
silver medal	Shana Lim Jia Yi	Singapore
bronze medal	Nguyễn Thị Ánh Viên	Vietnam

The women's 50 metre backstroke competition of the swimming event at the 2015 SEA Games was held on 8 June at the OCBC Aquatic Centre in Kallang, Singapore.

== Records ==
Prior to this competition, the existing Asian and Games records were as follows:

Asian record	Zhao Jing (CHN)	27.06	Rome, Italy	30 July 2009
Games record	Shana Lim Jia Yi (SIN)	29.37	Palembang, Indonesia	14 November 2011

The following records were established during the competition:

Date	Event	Name	Nationality	Time	Record
8 June	Heat 2	Tao Li	Singapore (SIN)	29.14	GR
8 June	Final	Tao Li	Singapore (SIN)	28.90	GR

== Schedule ==
All times are Singapore Standard Time (UTC+08:00)

Date	Time	Event
Monday, 8 June 2015	09:00	Heat 1
Monday, 8 June 2015	09:02	Heat 2
Monday, 8 June 2015	19:00	Final

== Results ==
KEY:	q	Fastest non-qualifiers	Q	Qualified	GR	Games record	NR	National record	PB	Personal best	SB	Seasonal best

=== Heats ===
Source: Heats Results Summary

The heats were held on 8 June.

==== Heat 1 ====
Source: Heat 1 Results

Heat 1 was held on 8 June.

Rank	Lane	Athletes	Time	Notes
1	4	Shana Lim Jia Yi (SIN)	29.58	Q
2	3	Anak Agung Istri Kania Ratih (INA)	29.73	Q
3	5	Caroline Chan Zi Xin (MAS)	30.15	Q
4	6	Roxanne Ashley Yu (PHI)	31.04	
5	2	Seng Samphors (CAM)	35.97	

==== Heat 2 ====
Source: Heat 2 Results

Heat 2 was held on 8 June.

Rank	Lane	Athletes	Time	Notes
1	5	Tao Li (SIN)	29.14	Q, GR
2	4	Nguyễn Thị Ánh Viên (VIE)	29.92	Q
3	3	Araya Wongvat (THA)	30.42	Q
4	6	Nurul Fajar Fitriyati (INA)	30.57	Q
5	2	Elizabeth Ann Jordana (PHI)	30.67	Q

=== Final ===
Source: Final Results

The final was held on 8 June.

Rank	Lane	Athletes	Time	Notes
1st place, gold medalist(s)	4	Tao Li (SIN)	28.90	GR
2nd place, silver medalist(s)	5	Shana Lim Jia Yi (SIN)	29.36	
3rd place, bronze medalist(s)	6	Nguyễn Thị Ánh Viên (VIE)	29.40	
4	3	Anak Agung Istri Kania Ratih (INA)	29.48	NR
5	2	Caroline Chan Zi Xin (MAS)	29.85	
6	7	Araya Wongvat (THA)	30.26	
7	8	Elizabeth Ann Jordana (PHI)	30.29	
8	1	Nurul Fajar Fitriyati (INA)	30.59	
