= Swimming at the 2015 SEA Games – Men's 200 metre backstroke =

Swimming – Men's 200 metre backstroke at the 2015 SEA Games
- Venue: OCBC Aquatic Centre
- Date: 8 June 2015
- Competitors: 8 from 6 nations

Medalists
gold medal	Quah Zheng Wen	Singapore
silver medal	Trần Duy Khôi	Vietnam
bronze medal	Ricky Anggawidjaja	Indonesia

The men's 200 metre backstroke competition of the swimming event at the 2015 SEA Games was held on 8 June at the OCBC Aquatic Centre in Kallang, Singapore.

== Records ==
Prior to this competition, the existing Asian and Games records were as follows:

Asian Record	Irie Ryosuke (JPN)	1:52.51	Rome, Italy	31 July 2009
Games Record	Raymond Papa (PHI)	2:00.96	Jakarta, Indonesia	10 December 1997

The following records were established during the competition:

Date	Event	Name	Nationality	Time	Record
8 June	Final	Quah Zheng Wen	Singapore (SIN)	2:00.55	GR

== Schedule ==
All times are Singapore Standard Time (UTC+08:00)

Date	Time	Event
Monday, 8 June 2015	19:42	Final

== Results ==
KEY:	Q	Qualified	GR	Games record	NR	National record	PB	Personal best	SB	Seasonal best	WD	Withdrew	DNF	Did not finish

=== Final ===
Source: Final Results

The final was held on 8 June.

Rank	Lane	Athletes	Time	Notes
1st place, gold medalist(s)	4	Quah Zheng Wen (SIN)	2:00.55	GR
2nd place, silver medalist(s)	2	Trần Duy Khôi (VIE)	2:02.44	
3rd place, bronze medalist(s)	3	Ricky Anggawidjaja (INA)	2:03.03	
4	1	Tern Jian Han (MAS)	2:06.15	
5	7	Jose Joaquin Gonzalez (PHI)	2:06.74	
6	5	I Gede Siman Sudartawa (INA)	2:07.03	
7	6	Low Wei Yang Malcolm (SIN)	2:08.25	
8	8	Thanapoom Krueakhamkhao (THA)	2:16.70	
