= List of Indonesian records in swimming =

The Indonesian records in swimming are the fastest ever performances of swimmers from Indonesia, which are recognised and ratified by Indonesia's national swimming federation: Persatuan Renang Seluruh Indonesia (PRSI).

== Long Course (50 m) ==
=== Men ===
Event	Time		Name	Club	Date	Meet	Location	Ref
50 m freestyle	22.66		Triady Fauzi Sidiq	Indonesia	24 August 2017	Southeast Asian Games	Kuala Lumpur, Malaysia	
100 m freestyle	49.99		Triady Fauzi Sidiq	Indonesia	13 December 2013	Southeast Asian Games	Naypyidaw, Myanmar	
200 m freestyle	1:50.35		Joe Kurniawan	DKI Jakarta	17 September 2024	National Sports Week	Medan, Indonesia	
200 m freestyle	1:49.89	h, #	Harrison Andoko	Indonesia	23 September 2026	Asian Games	Tokyo, Japan	
400 m freestyle	3:52.16		Aflah Fadlan Prawira	Indonesia	21 March 2019	Singapore Age Group Championships	Singapore, Singapore	
800 m freestyle	8:03.87		Aflah Fadlan Prawira	Indonesia	20 August 2018	Asian Games	Jakarta, Indonesia	
1500 m freestyle	15:15.77		Aflah Fadlan Prawira	Indonesia	5 December 2019	Southeast Asian Games	New Clark City, Philippines	
50 m backstroke	25.01	h	I Gede Siman Sudartawa	Indonesia	20 August 2018	Asian Games	Jakarta, Indonesia	
100 m backstroke	54.77	r	Jason Yusuf	Indonesia	22 September 2026	Asian Games	Tokyo, Japan	
200 m backstroke	2:01.16		Farrel Armandio Tangkas	Kraken Aquatic	28 September 2019	Jakarta Open	Jakarta, Indonesia	
50 m breaststroke	26.98	h	Felix Viktor Iberle	Indonesia	8 September 2023	World Junior Championships	Netanya, Israel	
100 m breaststroke	1:00.88		Arya Adrean Putra Haryono	DI Yogyakarta	29 April 2026	Indonesian Age Group Championships	Jakarta, Indonesia	
200 m breaststroke	2:15.36		Gagarin Nathaniel Yus	DKI Jakarta	24 April 2017	Festival Akuatik Indonesia	Palembang, Indonesia	
50m butterfly	23.84		Glenn Victor Sutanto	Indonesia	5 December 2019	Southeast Asian Games	New Clark City, Philippines	
100m butterfly	52.75		Joe Kurniawan	Indonesia	15 December 2023	Indonesia Open Championships	Jakarta, Indonesia	
200m butterfly	1:59.66		Triady Fauzi Sidiq	Indonesia	26 September 2013	Islamic Solidarity Games	Palembang, Indonesia	
200m individual medley	2:01.72		Triady Fauzi Sidiq	Indonesia	24 August 2017	Southeast Asian Games	Kuala Lumpur, Malaysia	
400m individual medley	4:21.30		Aflah Fadlan Prawira	Indonesia	8 December 2019	Southeast Asian Games	New Clark City, Philippines	
4×100m freestyle relay	3:20.84		Kevin Prayitno (50.96); Jason Yusuf (49.97); Liquor Harrison Andoko (50.14); Samuel Septionus (49.77)	Indonesia	24 September 2026	Asian Games	Tokyo, Japan	
4×200m freestyle relay	7:27.17		Made Aubrey Jaya (1:51.09); Mochammad Akbar Putra Taufik (1:52.89); Liquor Harrison Andoko (1:53.18); Nicholas Karel Subagyo (1:50.01)	Indonesia	11 December 2025	Southeast Asian Games	Bangkok, Thailand	
4×100m medley relay	3:38.18		I Gede Siman Sudartawa (55.02); Gagarin Nathaniel Yus (1:01.40); Glenn Victor Sutanto (52.48); Triady Fauzi Sidiq (49.28)	Indonesia	24 August 2018	Asian Games	Jakarta, Indonesia	

Legend: # – Record awaiting ratification by Persatuan Renang Seluruh Indonesia; WR – World record; AS – Asian record; e – equalled existing record;
Records not set in finals: h – heat; sf – semifinal; r – relay 1st leg; rh – relay heat 1st leg; b – B final; † – en route to final mark; so – swim-off; tt – time trial

=== Women ===
Event	Time		Name	Club	Date	Meet	Location	Ref
50m freestyle	25.62	h	Nadia Aisha Nurazmi	Indonesia	24 September 2026	Asian Games	Tokyo, Japan	
100m freestyle	56.49		Adelia Chantika Aulia	Dki Jakarta	29 May 2025	Indonesian Championships	Jakarta, Indonesia	
200m freestyle	2:02.74		Ressa Kania Dewi	Indonesia	15 June 2017	Singapore Championships	Singapore, Singapore	
400m freestyle	4:16.84		Adinda Larasati Dewi	Jawa Timur	16 April 2018	Festival Akuatik Indonesia	Surabaya, Indonesia	
800m freestyle	8:52.80		Adinda Larasati Dewi	Jawa Timur	17 April 2018	Festival Akuatik Indonesia	Surabaya, Indonesia	
1500m freestyle	17:05.38		Magdalena Sutanto	Bolles School Sharks	1 April 2006	US Spring Championships	Federal Way, United States	
50m backstroke	28.80		Masniari Wolf	Indonesia	11 December 2025	Southeast Asian Games	Bangkok, Thailand	
100m backstroke	1:02.25		Flairene Candrea	Dki Jakarta	29 May 2025	Indonesian Championships	Jakarta, Indonesia	
200m backstroke	2:15.73		Yessy Yosaputra	Indonesia	13 November 2011	Southeast Asian Games	Palembang, Indonesia	
50m breaststroke	32.13		Anandia Evato	Indonesia	17 June 2017	Singapore Championships	Singapore, Singapore	
100m breaststroke	1:09.78	h	Anandia Evato	Indonesia	19 August 2018	Asian Games	Jakarta, Indonesia	
200m breaststroke	2:32.09		Adellia	Indonesia	19 March 2025 (Note: by official result source; 14 March 2025 by Persatuan Renang Seluruh Indonesia source, a typo)	Singapore Age Group Championships	Singapore, Singapore	
50m butterfly	27.40	h	Anak Agung Istri Kania Ratih Atmaja	DKI Jakarta	12 October 2021	National Sports Week	Jayapura, Indonesia	
100m butterfly	1:00.55		Adinda Larasati Dewi	Jawa Timur	25 April 2019	Festival Akuatik Indonesia	Jakarta, Indonesia	
200m butterfly	2:12.84		Adinda Larasati Dewi	Jawa Timur	28 April 2019	Festival Akuatik Indonesia	Jakarta, Indonesia	
200m individual medley	2:16.43		Azzahra Permatahani	Belibis Pekanbaru	27 September 2019	Jakarta Open	Jakarta, Indonesia	
400m individual medley	4:48.51		Azzahra Permatahani	Indonesia	21 March 2019	Singapore Age Group Championships	Singapore, Singapore	
4×100m freestyle relay	3:50.56		Ressa Kania Dewi (57.65); Sagita Putri Krisdewanti (57.17); Adinda Larasati Dewi (58.59); Patricia Yosita Hapsari (57.15)	Indonesia	21 August 2017	Southeast Asian Games	Kuala Lumpur, Malaysia	
4×200m freestyle relay	8:19.05		Sagita Putri Krisdewanti (2:05.43); Ressa Kania Dewi (2:04.09); Adinda Larasati Dewi (2:05.87); Patricia Yosita Hapsari (2:03.66)	Indonesia	23 August 2017	Southeast Asian Games	Kuala Lumpur, Malaysia	
4×100m medley relay	4:11.63		Nurul Fajar Fitriyati (1:03.42); Anandia Evato (1:09.75); Adinda Larasati Dewi (1:01.45); Patricia Yosita Hapsari (57.02)	Indonesia	23 August 2018	Asian Games	Jakarta, Indonesia	

Legend: # – Record awaiting ratification by Persatuan Renang Seluruh Indonesia; WR – World record; AS – Asian record; e – equalled existing record;
Records not set in finals: h – heat; sf – semifinal; r – relay 1st leg; rh – relay heat 1st leg; b – B final; † – en route to final mark; so – swim-off; tt – time trial

=== Mixed relay ===
Event	Time		Name	Club	Date	Meet	Location	Ref
4×100 m freestyle relay	3:39.13 (Note: by official result source: 3:39.11 by PRSI source, a typo)		Kevin Erlangga Prayitno (52.19); Adelia Aulia (57.79); Chelsea Alexandra (58.54); Samuel Septionus (50.61)	Indonesia	30 October 2025 (Note: by official result source: 23 October 2025 by PRSI source, a typo)	Asian Youth Games	Isa Town, Bahrain	
4×200 m freestyle relay	8:12.27	unofficial	Adelia Chantika Aulia (2:10.05); Moch. Akbar Putra Taufik (1:54.51); Sebastian Frederick Harsono (1:56.35); Patrice Eugenia Fauzi (2:11.36)	Indonesia	8 December 2024	46th Southeast Asian Age Group Championships	Samut Prakan, Thailand	
4×100 m medley relay	3:54.40	h	Flairene Candrea (1:02.56); Arya Haryono (1:01.69); Joe Kurniawan (53.46); Adelia Chantika Aulia (56.69)	Indonesia	23 September 2026	Asian Games	Tokyo, Japan	

Legend: # – Record awaiting ratification by Persatuan Renang Seluruh Indonesia; WR – World record; AS – Asian record; e – equalled existing record;
Records not set in finals: h – heat; sf – semifinal; r – relay 1st leg; rh – relay heat 1st leg; b – B final; † – en route to final mark; so – swim-off; tt – time trial

== Short Course (25 m) ==
=== Men ===
Event	Time		Name	Club	Date	Meet	Location	Ref
50m freestyle	22.03	h	Samuel Maxson Septionus	JAQ Aquatics	1 November 2026	Singaporean Championships	Singapore, Singapore	
100m freestyle	48.57		Joe Kurniawan	National Training Centre	21 September 2025	Big 10 Invitational Series	Jakarta, Indonesia	
200m freestyle	1:46.99		Made Aubrey Jaya	Southern Methodist	22 October 2026	Arizona State vs Southern Methodist	Tempe, United States	
400m freestyle	3:49.13	h	Aflah Fadlan Prawira	Indonesia	16 December 2021	World Championships	Abu Dhabi, United Arab Emirates	
800m freestyle	8:06.49		Aflah Fadlan Prawira	Indonesia	1 November 2019	Fall Invitational	Jakarta, Indonesia	
1500m freestyle	15:52.38		Nicholas Karel Subagyo	Indonesia	11 October 2025	World Cup	Carmel, United States	
50m backstroke	23.65		Jason Donovan Yusuf	Nautilus	4 June 2026	Indonesia Emerging Series	Jakarta, Indonesia	
100m backstroke	52.06		Jason Donovan Yusuf	Nautilus	6 June 2026	Indonesia Emerging Series	Jakarta, Indonesia	
200m backstroke	1:58.08		Jason Donovan Yusuf	Nautilus	5 June 2026	Indonesia Emerging Series	Jakarta, Indonesia	
50m breaststroke	26.99	h	Arya Adrean Putra Haryono	National Training Centre	1 November 2026	Singaporean Championships	Singapore, Singapore	
100m breaststroke	58.68		Arya Adrean Putra Haryono	Kaizen	4 June 2026	Indonesia Emerging Series	Jakarta, Indonesia	
200m breaststroke	2:12.39		Arya Adrean Putra Haryono	Kaizen	5 June 2026	Indonesia Emerging Series	Jakarta, Indonesia	
50m butterfly	23.10		Joe Kurniawan	National Training Centre	20 September 2025	Big 10 Invitational Series	Jakarta, Indonesia	
100m butterfly	51.42		Joe Kurniawan	National Training Centre	20 September 2025	Big 10 Invitational Series	Jakarta, Indonesia	
200m butterfly	1:59.77		Albert Christiadi Sutanto	Indonesia	12 February 2000	World Cup	Paris, France	
100m individual medley	55.04		Joe Kurniawan	Indonesia	13 December 2024	Big 10 Invitational Series	Jakarta, Indonesia	
200m individual medley	2:01.13		Aflah Fadlan Prawira	Indonesia	8 April 2022	KLIMSWIM Invitational Championships	Badung Regency, Indonesia	
400m individual medley	4:13.61	h	Aflah Fadlan Prawira	Indonesia	20 December 2021	World Championships	Abu Dhabi, United Arab Emirates	
4×50m freestyle relay	1:29.01 (Note: later disqualified after Guntur Pratama Putera tested positive for Methylhexanamine.)		Triady Fauzi Sidiq (22.15); Guntur Pratama Putera (21.91); Alexis Wijaya Ohmar (22.46); Glenn Victor Sutanto (22.49)	Indonesia	2 July 2013	Asian Indoor and Martial Arts Games	Incheon, South Korea	
4×100m freestyle relay	3:19.10		Triady Fauzi Sidiq (49.72); Alexis Wijaya Ohmar (49.92); Guntur Pratama Putera (50.06); Glenn Victor Sutanto (49.40)	Indonesia	1 July 2013	Asian Indoor and Martial Arts Games	Incheon, South Korea	
4×200m freestyle relay								
4×50m medley relay	1:36.60 (Note: later disqualified after Indra Gunawan tested positive for Methylhexanamine.)		I Gede Siman Sudartawa (24.60); Indra Gunawan (26.64); Glenn Victor Sutanto (23.42); Triady Fauzi Sidiq (21.94)	Indonesia	30 June 2013	Asian Indoor and Martial Arts Games	Incheon, South Korea	
4×100m medley relay	3:40.14	h	I Gede Siman Sudartawa (56.01); Indra Gunawan (1:00.62); Glenn Victor Sutanto (52.95); Triady Fauzi Sidiq (50.16)	Indonesia	3 July 2013	Asian Indoor and Martial Arts Games	Incheon, South Korea	

Legend: # – Record awaiting ratification by Persatuan Renang Seluruh Indonesia; WR – World record; AS – Asian record; e – equalled existing record;
Records not set in finals: h – heat; sf – semifinal; r – relay 1st leg; rh – relay heat 1st leg; b – B final; † – en route to final mark; so – swim-off; tt – time trial

=== Women ===
Event	Time		Name	Club	Date	Meet	Location	Ref
50 m freestyle	25.38		Adelia Chantika Aulia	National Training Centre	20 September 2025	Big 10 Invitational Series	Jakarta, Indonesia	
100 m freestyle	54.84		Adelia Chantika Aulia	National Training Centre	21 September 2025	Big 10 Invitational Series	Jakarta, Indonesia	
200 m freestyle	2:00.38		Adelia Chantika Aulia	Millenium Aquatic	5 June 2026	Indonesia Emerging Series	Jakarta, Indonesia	
400 m freestyle	4:22.20		Ressa Kania Dewi	Indonesia	17 October 2010	World Cup	Singapore, Singapore	
800 m freestyle	8:55.99		Magdalena Sutanto	Indonesia	3 February 2006	World Cup	New York City, United States	
1500 m freestyle								
50m backstroke	27.61	r	Masniari Wolf	SG Frankfurt	12 November 2026	German Championships	Wuppertal, Germany	
100m backstroke	59.52		Adelia Chantika Aulia	Indonesia	13 December 2024	Big 10 Invitational Series	Jakarta, Indonesia	
200m backstroke	2:13.89		Nurul Fajar Fitriyati	Indonesia	3 November 2019	Fall Invitational	Jakarta, Indonesia	
50m breaststroke	31.68	h	Adellia .	Indonesia	12 December 2024	Big 10 Invitational Series	Jakarta, Indonesia	
100m breaststroke	1:09.13	h	Adellia .	Indonesia	13 December 2024	Big 10 Invitational Series	Jakarta, Indonesia	
200m breaststroke	2:29.96		Ressa Kania Dewi	Indonesia	8 April 2022	KLIMSWIM Invitational Championships	Badung Regency, Indonesia	
50m butterfly	27.22		Angel Gabriella Yus	Indonesia	9 April 2022	KLIMSWIM Invitational Championships	Badung Regency, Indonesia	
100m butterfly	59.84		Michelle Surjadi Fang	National Training Centre	20 September 2025	Big 10 Invitational Series	Jakarta, Indonesia	
200m butterfly	2:11.53		Catherine Surya	Indonesia	17 April 1997	World Championships	Gothenburg, Sweden	
100m individual medley	1:03.72		Azzahra Permatahani	Indonesia	13 December 2024	Big 10 Invitational Series	Jakarta, Indonesia	
200m individual medley	2:14.95		Ressa Kania Dewi	Indonesia	9 April 2022	KLIMSWIM Invitational Championships	Badung Regency, Indonesia	
400m individual medley	4:50.62		Azzahra Permatahani	Indonesia	9 April 2022	KLIMSWIM Invitational Championships	Badung Regency, Indonesia	
4×50m freestyle relay	1:45.72		Patricia Yosita Hapsari (26.47); Kathriana Mella Gustianjani (26.83); Enny Susilawati Margono (26.48); Ressa Kania Dewi (25.94)	Indonesia	2 July 2013	Asian Indoor and Martial Arts Games	Incheon, South Korea	
4×100m freestyle relay	3:50.15		Kathriana Mella Gustianjani (58.45); Raina Ramdhani (57.97); Ressa Kania Dewi (57.17); Patricia Yosita Hapsari (56.56)	Indonesia	1 July 2013	Asian Indoor and Martial Arts Games	Incheon, South Korea	
4×200m freestyle relay								
4×50m medley relay	1:54.92		Ni Putu Pande Lisa Primasari; Adelia .; Gusti Ayu Made Nadya Saraswati; Serenna Karmelita Muslim	Indonesia	28 January 2023	SEA Dual Meet Series	Jakarta, Indonesia	
4×100m medley relay	4:18.26		Nurul Fajar Fitriyati (1:03.79); Margareta Kretapradani (1:12.72); Monalisa Arieswati Lorenza (1:02.42); Sagita Putri Krisdewanti (59.33)	Indonesia	3 July 2013	Asian Indoor and Martial Arts Games	Incheon, South Korea	

Legend: # – Record awaiting ratification by Persatuan Renang Seluruh Indonesia; WR – World record; AS – Asian record; e – equalled existing record;
Records not set in finals: h – heat; sf – semifinal; r – relay 1st leg; rh – relay heat 1st leg; b – B final; † – en route to final mark; so – swim-off; tt – time trial
