= Swimming at the 2015 SEA Games – Men's 1500 metre freestyle =

Swimming – Men's 1500 metre freestyle at the 2015 SEA Games
- Venue: OCBC Aquatic Centre
- Date: 10 June 2015
- Competitors: 9 from 5 nations

Medalists
gold medal	Lâm Quang Nhật	Vietnam
silver medal	Aflah Fadlan Prawira	Indonesia
bronze medal	Kevin Yeap Soon Choy	Malaysia

The men's 1500 metre freestyle competition of the swimming event at the 2015 SEA Games was held on 10 June at the OCBC Aquatic Centre in Kallang, Singapore.

== Records ==
Prior to this competition, the existing Asian and Games records were as follows:

Asian record	Sun Yang (CHN)	14:31.02	London, Great Britain	4 August 2012
Games record	Ryan Arabejo (PHI)	15:37.75	Vientiane, Laos	13 December 2009

The following records were established during the competition:

Date	Event	Name	Nationality	Time	Record
10 June	Final 2	Lâm Quang Nhật	Vietnam (VIE)	15:31.03	GR

== Schedule ==
All times are Singapore Standard Time (UTC+08:00)

Date	Time	Event
Wednesday 10 June 2015	09:04	Final 1
Wednesday 10 June 2015	19:38	Final 2

== Results ==
KEY:	GR	Games record	NR	National record	PB	Personal best	SB	Seasonal best	WD	Withdrew	DNF	Did not finish

=== Final ===
This event was held in 2 Final sessions, both on 10 June.

==== Final 1 ====
Source: Final 1 Results

Rank	Lane	Athletes	Time	Notes
1	4	Peerapat Lertsathapornsuk (THA)	15:58.34	
2	3	Teo Zhen Ren (SIN)	16:13.13	
3	5	Boon Ji Chao Benedict (SIN)	16:19.28	

==== Final 2 ====
Source: Final 2 Results

Rank	Lane	Athletes	Time	Notes
1	5	Lâm Quang Nhật (VIE)	15:31.03	GR
2	2	Aflah Fadlan Prawira (INA)	15:38.23	
3	4	Kevin Yeap Soon Choy (MAS)	15:55.69	
4	3	Tanakrit Kittiya (THA)	16:00.11	
5	7	Vernon Lee Jeau Zhi (MAS)	16:15.89	
6	6	Satrio Bagaskara Gunadi Putra (INA)	16:32.68	

==== Overall Finals Ranking ====
Source: Finals Results Summary

Rank	Athletes	Time	Notes
1st place, gold medalist(s)	Lâm Quang Nhật (VIE)	15:31.03	GR
2nd place, silver medalist(s)	Aflah Fadlan Prawira (INA)	15:38.23	
3rd place, bronze medalist(s)	Kevin Yeap Soon Choy (MAS)	15:55.69	
4	Peerapat Lertsathapornsuk (THA)	15:58.34	
5	Tanakrit Kittiya (THA)	16:00.11	
6	Teo Zhen Ren (SIN)	16:13.13	
7	Vernon Lee Jeau Zhi (MAS)	16:15.89	
8	Boon Ji Chao Benedict (SIN)	16:19.28	
9	Satrio Bagaskara Gunadi Putra (INA)	16:32.68	
