= Swimming at the 2015 SEA Games – Men's 100 metre butterfly =

Swimming – Men's 100 metre butterfly at the 2015 SEA Games
- Venue: OCBC Aquatic Centre
- Date: 9 June 2015
- Competitors: 13 from 7 nations

Medalists
gold medal	Joseph Isaac Schooling	Singapore
silver medal	Glenn Victor Sutanto	Indonesia
bronze medal	Triady Fauzi Sidiq	Indonesia

The men's 100 metre butterfly competition of the swimming event at the 2015 SEA Games was held on 9 June at the OCBC Aquatic Centre in Kallang, Singapore.

== Records ==
Prior to this competition, the existing Asian and Games records were as follows:

Asian Record	Kohei Kawamoto (JPN)	51.00	Niigata, Japan	11 September 2009
Games Record	Joseph Isaac Schooling (SIN)	52.67	Naypyidaw, Myanmar	14 December 2013

The following records were established during the competition:

Date	Event	Name	Nationality	Time	Record
9 June	Final	Joseph Isaac Schooling	Singapore (SIN)	52.13	GR

== Schedule ==
All times are Singapore Standard Time (UTC+08:00)

Date	Time	Event
Tuesday, 9 June 2015	09:06	Heat 1
Tuesday, 9 June 2015	09:07	Heat 2
Tuesday, 9 June 2015	19:06	Final

== Results ==
KEY:	Q	Qualified	GR	Games record	NR	National record	PB	Personal best	SB	Seasonal best	WD	Withdrew	DNF	Did not finish

=== Heats ===
Source: Heats Results Summary

The heats were held on 9 June.

==== Heat 1 ====
Source: Heat 1 Results

Heat 1 was held on 9 June.

Rank	Lane	Athletes	Time	Notes
1	6	Dylan Khoo Long Hai (SIN)	55.07	Q
2	4	Hoàng Quý Phước (VIE)	55.47	Q
3	3	Jessie Khing Lacuna (PHI)	55.50	Q
4	5	Glenn Victor Sutanto (INA)	55.82	Q
5	2	Aldrich McKirdy (PHI)	59.29	
6	7	Myat Thint (MYA)	1:02.63	

==== Heat 2 ====
Source: Heat 2 Results

Heat 2 was held on 9 June.

Rank	Lane	Athletes	Time	Notes
1	4	Joseph Isaac Schooling (SIN)	54.78	Q
2	5	Triady Fauzi Sidiq (INA)	54.95	Q
3	2	Navaphat Wongcharoen (THA)	55.26	Q
4	3	Supakrid Pananuratana (THA)	56.05	Q
5	6	Phan Gia Mẫn (VIE)	58.14	
6	7	Pou Sovijja (CAM)	58.46	
7	1	Lim Odam (CAM)	1:04.29	

=== Final ===
Source: Final Results

The final was held on 9 June.

Rank	Lane	Athletes	Time	Notes
1st place, gold medalist(s)	4	Joseph Isaac Schooling (SIN)	52.13	GR
2nd place, silver medalist(s)	1	Glenn Victor Sutanto (INA)	52.90	NR
3rd place, bronze medalist(s)	5	Triady Fauzi Sidiq (INA)	53.98	
4	2	Hoàng Quý Phước (VIE)	54.28	
5	3	Dylan Khoo Long Hai (SIN)	55.01	
6	6	Navaphat Wongcharoen (THA)	55.30	
7	7	Jessie Khing Lacuna (PHI)	55.34	
8	8	Supakrid Pananuratana (THA)	55.73	
