= Swimming at the 2015 SEA Games – Women's 200 metre individual medley =

Swimming – Women's 200 metre individual medley at the 2015 SEA Games
- Venue: OCBC Aquatic Centre
- Date: 7 June 2015
- Competitors: 12 from 7 nations

Medalists
gold medal	Nguyễn Thị Ánh Viên	Vietnam
silver medal	Phiangkhwan Pawapotako	Thailand
bronze medal	Samantha Louisa Ginn Yeo	Singapore

The women's 200 metre individual medley competition of the swimming event at the 2015 SEA Games was held on 7 June at the OCBC Aquatic Centre in Kallang, Singapore.

== Records ==
Prior to this competition, the existing Asian and Games records were as follows:

Asian record	Ye Shiwen (CHN)	2:07.57	London, England	31 July 2012
Games record	Siow Yi Ting (MAS)	2:14.57	Vientiane, Laos	10 December 2009

The following records were established during the competition:

Date	Event	Name	Nationality	Time	Record
7 June	Final	Nguyễn Thị Ánh Viên	Vietnam (VIE)	2:13.53	GR

== Schedule ==
All times are Singapore Standard Time (UTC+08:00)

Date	Time	Event
Sunday, 7 June 2015	09:08	Heat 1
Sunday, 7 June 2015	09:10	Heat 2
Sunday, 7 June 2015	20:19	Final

== Results ==
KEY:	q	Fastest non-qualifiers	Q	Qualified	GR	Games record	NR	National record	PB	Personal best	SB	Seasonal best

=== Heats ===
Source: Heats results summary

The heats were held on 7 June.

==== Heat 1 ====
Source: Heat 1 results

Heat 1 was held on 7 June.

Rank	Lane	Athletes	Time	Notes
1	2	Phiangkhwan Pawapotako (THA)	2:22.37	Q
2	3	Patricia Yosita Hapsari (INA)	2:22.82	Q
3	4	Hannah Dato (PHI)	2:23.30	Q
4	5	Erika Kong Chia Chia (MAS)	2:23.78	
5	6	Nguyễn Diệp Phương Trâm (VIE)	2:27.04	
6	7	San Su Moe Theint (MYA)	2:34.54	

==== Heat 2 ====
Source: Heat 2 results

Heat 2 was held on 7 June.

Rank	Lane	Athletes	Time	Notes
1	2	Nguyễn Thị Ánh Viên (VIE)	2:17.74	Q
2	3	Samantha Louisa Ginn Yeo (SIN)	2:20.75	Q
3	4	Meagan Lim Shen-Hui (SIN)	2:20.98	Q
4	5	Ressa Kania Dewi (INA)	2:21.77	Q
5	6	Kanitta Nimdam (THA)	2:23.60	Q
6	7	Oo Shun Lei Maw (MYA)	2:38.88	

=== Final ===
Source: Final Results

The final was held on 7 June.

Rank	Lane	Athletes	Time	Notes
1st place, gold medalist(s)	4	Nguyễn Thị Ánh Viên (VIE)	2:13.53	GR
2nd place, silver medalist(s)	2	Phiangkhwan Pawapotako (THA)	2:18.56	
3rd place, bronze medalist(s)	5	Samantha Louisa Ginn Yeo (SIN)	2:18.77	
4	6	Ressa Kania Dewi (INA)	2:20.72	
5	1	Hannah Dato (PHI)	2:21.65	
6	3	Meagan Lim Shen-Hui (SIN)	2:22.66	
7	8	Kanitta Nimdam (THA)	2:24.34	
8	7	Patricia Yosita Hapsari (INA)	2:25.49	
