= Swimming at the 2015 SEA Games – Women's 400 metre freestyle =

Swimming – Women's 400 metre freestyle at the 2015 SEA Games
- Venue: OCBC Aquatic Centre
- Date: 10 June 2015
- Competitors: 11 from 7 nations

Medalists
gold medal	Nguyễn Thị Ánh Viên	Vietnam
silver medal	Khoo Cai Lin	Malaysia
bronze medal	Ammiga Himathongkom	Thailand

The women's 400 metre freestyle competition of the swimming event at the 2015 SEA Games was held on 10 June at the OCBC Aquatic Centre in Kallang, Singapore.

== Records ==
Prior to this competition, the existing Asian and Games records were as follows:

Asian Record	Chen Qian (CHN)	4:02.35	Jinan, China	18 October 2009
Games Record	Khoo Cai Lin (MAS)	4:10.75	Vientiane, Laos	11 December 2009

The following records were established during the competition:

Date	Event	Name	Nationality	Time	Record
10 June	Final	Nguyễn Thị Ánh Viên	Vietnam (VIE)	4:08.66	GR

== Schedule ==
All times are Singapore Standard Time (UTC+08:00)

Date	Time	Event
Wednesday, 10 June 2015	09:22	Heat 1
Wednesday, 10 June 2015	09:26	Heat 2
Wednesday, 10 June 2015	19:58	Final

== Results ==
KEY:	Q	Qualified	GR	Games record	NR	National record	PB	Personal best	SB	Seasonal best	WD	Withdrew	DNF	Did not finish

=== Heats ===
Source: Heats Results Summary

The heats were held on 10 June.

==== Heat 1 ====
Source: Heat 1 Results

Heat 1 was held on 10 June.

Rank	Lane	Athletes	Time	Notes
1	3	Christie May Chue Mun Ee (SIN)	4:24.51	Q
2	4	Benjaporn Sriphanomthorn (THA)	4:24.85	Q
3	6	Ammiga Himathongkom (THA)	4:25.03	Q
4	5	Tseng Wei Wen Rachel (SIN)	4:25.06	Q
5	2	Angela Chieng Chui Fei (MAS)	4:30.91	Q
6	7	Oo Shun Lei Maw (MYA)	4:52.83	

==== Heat 2 ====
Source: Heat 2 Results

Heat 2 was held on 10 June.

Rank	Lane	Athletes	Time	Notes
1	4	Nguyễn Thị Ánh Viên (VIE)	4:24.83	Q
2	5	Khoo Cai Lin (MAS)	4:27.17	Q
2	3	Raina Saumi Graha Ramadhani (INA)	4:30.31	Q
4	7	Sagita Putri Krisdewanti (INA)	4:32.03	
5	6	Rosalee Mira Santa Ana (PHI)	4:33.19	

=== Final ===
Source: Final Results

The final was held on 10 June.

Rank	Lane	Athletes	Time	Notes
1st place, gold medalist(s)	5	Nguyễn Thị Ánh Viên (VIE)	4:08.66	GR
2nd place, silver medalist(s)	7	Khoo Cai Lin (MAS)	4:17.79	
3rd place, bronze medalist(s)	6	Ammiga Himathongkom (THA)	4:20.20	
4	4	Christie May Chue Mun Ee (SIN)	4:23.69	
5	2	Tseng Wei Wen Rachel (SIN)	4:24.99	
6	1	Raina Saumi Graha Ramadhani (INA)	4:27.12	
7	3	Benjaporn Sriphanomthorn (THA)	4:27.48	
8	8	Angela Chieng Chui Fei (MAS)	4:31.05	
