= Swimming at the 2015 SEA Games – Men's 50 metre breaststroke =

Swimming – Men's 50 metre breaststroke at the 2015 SEA Games
- Venue: OCBC Aquatic Centre
- Date: 11 June 2015
- Competitors: 13 from 8 nations

Medalists
gold medal	Indra Gunawan	Indonesia
silver medal	Joshua Hall	Philippines
bronze medal	Wong Fu Kang	Malaysia

The men's 50 metre breaststroke competition of the swimming event at the 2015 SEA Games was held on 11 June at the OCBC Aquatic Centre in Kallang, Singapore.

== Records ==
Prior to this competition, the existing Asian and Games records were as follows:

Asian record	Kosuke Kitajima (JPN)	27.30	Tokyo, Japan	13 April 2010
Games record	Indra Gunawan (INA)	28.25	Palembang, Indonesia	13 November 2011

== Schedule ==
All times are Singapore Standard Time (UTC+08:00)

Date	Time	Event
Thursday, 11 June 2015	09:00	Heat 1
Thursday, 11 June 2015	09:01	Heat 2
Thursday, 11 June 2015	19:00	Final

== Results ==
KEY:	Q	Qualified	GR	Games record	NR	National record	PB	Personal best	SB	Seasonal best	WD	Withdrew	DNF	Did not finish

=== Heats ===
Source: Heats results summary

The heats were held on 11 June.

==== Heat 1 ====
Source: Heat 1 results

Heat 1 was held on 11 June.

Rank	Lane	Athletes	Time	Notes
1	4	Indra Gunawan (INA)	28.90	Q
2	6	Radomyos Matjiur (THA)	29.30	Q
3	3	Shaun Yap Kah Choon (MAS)	29.38	Q
4	5	Dennis Josua Tiwa (INA)	29.47	Q
5	2	Kitiphat Pipimnan (THA)	30.45	
6	7	Soukanya Vongxay (LAO)	35.39	

==== Heat 2 ====
Source: Heat 2 results

Heat 2 was held on 11 June.

Rank	Lane	Athletes	Time	Notes
1	6	Joshua Hall (PHI)	28.39	Q
2	4	Clement Lim Yong'En (SIN)	28.64	Q
3	3	Wong Fu Kang (MAS)	28.78	Q
4	5	Khoo Chien Yin Lionel (SIN)	28.88	Q
5	2	Phan Gia Mẫn (VIE)	30.98	
6	7	Slava Sihanouvong (LAO)	33.06	
7	1	Hem Thonponloeu (CAM)	33.23	

=== Final ===
Source: Final Results

The final was held on 11 June.

Rank	Lane	Athletes	Time	Notes
1st place, gold medalist(s)	2	Indra Gunawan (INA)	28.27	
2nd place, silver medalist(s)	4	Joshua Hall (PHI)	28.32	
3rd place, bronze medalist(s)	3	Wong Fu Kang (MAS)	28.67	
4	5	Clement Lim Yong'En (SIN)	28.74	
5	7	Radomyos Matjiur (THA)	28.79	NR
6	6	Khoo Chien Yin Lionel (SIN)	28.92	
7	1	Shaun Yap Kah Choon (MAS)	28.94	
8	8	Dennis Josua Tiwa (INA)	29.03	
