= Welson Sim =

Malaysian swimmer

Personal information
- Full name: Welson Sim Wee Sheng
- Nationality: Malaysian
- Born: 29 March 1997 (age 29) Kuching, Sarawak, Malaysia
- Height: 1.81 m (5 ft 11 in)
- Weight: 70 kg (154 lb)

Sport
- Sport: Swimming
Medal record
Men's swimming
Representing Malaysia
Southeast Asian Games
Gold medal – first place	2015 Singapore	400 m freestyle
Gold medal – first place	2017 Kuala Lumpur	400 m freestyle
Gold medal – first place	2017 Kuala Lumpur	200 m freestyle
Silver medal – second place	2013 Naypyidaw	4×100 m freestyle
Silver medal – second place	2013 Naypyidaw	4×200 m freestyle
Silver medal – second place	2015 Singapore	4×100 m freestyle
Silver medal – second place	2015 Singapore	4×200 m freestyle
Silver medal – second place	2017 Kuala Lumpur	4×100 m freestyle
Silver medal – second place	2019 Philippines	400 m freestyle
Silver medal – second place	2021 Hanoi	4×200 m freestyle
Bronze medal – third place	2013 Naypyidaw	1500 m freestyle
Bronze medal – third place	2015 Singapore	200 m freestyle
Bronze medal – third place	2019 Philippines	4×200 m freestyle

Welson Sim
- Traditional Chinese: 沈威勝
- Simplified Chinese: 沈威胜
Transcriptions
Standard Mandarin
- Hanyu Pinyin: Shěn Wēishèng

Welson Sim Wee Sheng (born 29 March 1997) is a Malaysian professional swimmer. He was the first Malaysian male swimmer to qualify for the men's 400 metre freestyle event at the 2016 Summer Olympics.

== Early and personal life ==
Sim was born in Kuching, Sarawak to Lee Ngiat Kim and Sim Ah Tee. He started joining swimming classes at the age of 10 to overcome childhood asthma, and competed in Sarawak's President Cup a year later. By the time he turned 12, he was in the Sarawak state swimming team. Sim attended Batu Lintang National Secondary School, before transferring to Bukit Jalil Sports School during the mid-semester in Form Three.

In March 2021, Sim involved in a motorcycle accident, resulting in a broken arm and had two pins inserted into his left arm.
