= Swimming at the 2015 SEA Games – Men's 200 metre individual medley =

Swimming – Men's 200 metre individual medley at the 2015 SEA Games
- Venue: OCBC Aquatic Centre
- Date: 7 June 2015
- Competitors: 9 from 5 nations

Medalists
gold medal	Joseph Isaac Schooling	Singapore
silver medal	Quah Zheng Wen	Singapore
bronze medal	Jessie Khing Lacuna	Philippines

The men's 200 metre individual medley competition of the swimming event at the 2015 SEA Games was held on 10 June at the OCBC Aquatic Centre in Kallang, Singapore.

== Records ==
Prior to this competition, the existing Asian and Games records were as follows:

Asian record	Kosuke Hagino (JPN)	1:55.34	Incheon, South Korea	22 September 2014
Games record	Joseph Isaac Schooling (SIN)	2:00.82	Naypyidaw, Myanmar	13 December 2013

The following records were established during the competition:

Date	Event	Name	Nationality	Time	Record
10 June	Final	Joseph Isaac Schooling	Singapore (SIN)	2:00.66	

== Schedule ==
All times are Singapore Standard Time (UTC+08:00)

Date	Time	Event
Wednesday, 10 June 2015	09:32	Heat 1
Wednesday, 10 June 2015	09:34	Heat 2
Wednesday, 10 June 2015	20:36	Final

== Results ==
KEY:	Q	Qualified	GR	Games record	NR	National record	PB	Personal best	SB	Seasonal best	WD	Withdrew	DNF	Did not finish

=== Heats ===
Source: Heats results summary

The heats were held on 10 June.

==== Heat 1 ====
Source: Heat 1 results

Heat 1 was held on 10 June.

Rank	Lane	Athletes	Time	Notes
1	4	Joseph Isaac Schooling (SIN)	2:10.75	Q
2	2	Jose Joaquin Gonzalez (PHI)	2:10.86	Q
3	5	Quah Zheng Wen (SIN)	2:11.65	Q
4	3	Trần Duy Khôi (VIE)	2:11.66	Q
5	6	Phan Gia Mẫn (VIE)	2:12.30	

==== Heat 2 ====
Source: Heat 2 results

Heat 2 was held on 10 June.

Rank	Lane	Athletes	Time	Notes
1	4	Triady Fauzi Sidiq (INA)	2:09.07	Q
2	5	Jessie Khing Lacuna (PHI)	2:09.63	Q
3	3	Jiarapong Sangkhawat (THA)	2:09.93	Q
4	6	Muhammad Hamgari (INA)	2:10.43	Q

=== Final ===
Source: Final Results

The final was held on 10 June.

Rank	Lane	Athletes	Time	Notes
1st place, gold medalist(s)	2	Joseph Isaac Schooling (SIN)	2:00.66	GR
2nd place, silver medalist(s)	1	Quah Zheng Wen (SIN)	2:02.22	
3rd place, bronze medalist(s)	5	Jessie Khing Lacuna (PHI)	2:02.24	
4	4	Triady Fauzi Sidiq (INA)	2:02.61	
5	8	Trần Duy Khôi (VIE)	2:04.07	
6	7	Jose Joaquin Gonzalez (PHI)	2:06.63	
7	3	Jiarapong Sangkhawat (THA)	2:07.93	
8	6	Muhammad Hamgari (INA)	2:09.34	
