= Swimming at the 2015 SEA Games – Men's 50 metre freestyle =

Swimming – Men's 50 metre freestyle at the 2015 SEA Games
- Venue: OCBC Aquatic Centre
- Date: 8 June 2015
- Competitors: 12 from 9 nations
- Winning time: 22.47 GR

Medalists
gold medal	Joseph Isaac Schooling	Singapore
silver medal	Napat Wesshasartar	Thailand
bronze medal	Triady Fauzi Sidiq	Indonesia

The men's 50 metre freestyle competition of the swimming event at the 2015 SEA Games was held on 8 June at the OCBC Aquatic Centre in Kallang, Singapore.

== Records ==
Prior to this competition, the existing Asian and Games records were as follows:

Asian Record	Shioura Shinri (JPN)	21.88	Tokyo, Japan	13 April 2014
Games Record	Daniel Eugenio Coakley (PHI)	22.62	Vientiane, Laos	13 December 2009

The following records were established during the competition:

Date	Event	Name	Nationality	Time	Record
8 June	Final	Joseph Isaac Schooling	Singapore (SIN)	22.47	GR

== Schedule ==
All times are Singapore Standard Time (UTC+08:00)

Date	Time	Event
Monday, 8 June 2015	09:03	Heat 1
Monday, 8 June 2015	09:04	Heat 2
Monday, 8 June 2015	19:04	Final

== Results ==
KEY:	q	Fastest non-qualifiers	Q	Qualified	GR	Games record	NR	National record	PB	Personal best	SB	Seasonal best

=== Heats ===
Source: Heats Results Summary

The heats were held on 8 June.

==== Heat 1 ====
Source: Heat 1 Results

Heat 1 was held on 8 June.

Rank	Lane	Athletes	Time	Notes
1	4	Joseph Isaac Schooling (SIN)	23.27	Q
2	6	Glenn Victor Sutanto (INA)	23.36	Q
3	3	Clement Lim Yong'En (SIN)	23.57	Q
4	5	Gavin Alexander Lewis (THA)	23.72	Q
5	2	Thoeun Thol (CAM)	27.64	
6	7	Soukanya Vongxay (LAO)	28.58	

==== Heat 2 ====
Source: Heat 2 Results

Heat 2 was held on 8 June.

Rank	Lane	Athletes	Time	Notes
1	4	Triady Fauzi Sidiq (INA)	23.19	Q
2	6	Napat Wesshasartar (THA)	23.52	Q
3	5	Tan Yean Yang Alwyn (MAS)	23.67	Q
4	3	Hoàng Quý Phước (VIE)	24.03	Q
5	2	Axel Toni Steven Ngui (PHI)	24.27	
6	7	Myat Thint (MYA)	27.87	

=== Final ===
Source: Final Results

The final was held on 8 June.

Rank	Lane	Athletes	Time	Notes
1st place, gold medalist(s)	5	Joseph Isaac Schooling (SIN)	22.47	GR
2nd place, silver medalist(s)	6	Napat Wesshasartar (THA)	23.08	
3rd place, bronze medalist(s)	4	Triady Fauzi Sidiq (INA)	23.11	
4	7	Tan Yean Yang Alwyn (MAS)	23.31	
5	1	Gavin Alexander Lewis (THA)	23.46	
6	3	Glenn Victor Sutanto (INA)	23.51	
7	2	Clement Lim Yong'En (SIN)	23.59	
8	8	Hoàng Quý Phước (VIE)	23.71	
