= Swimming at the 2015 SEA Games – Men's 100 metre freestyle =

Swimming – Men's 100 metre freestyle at the 2015 SEA Games
- Venue: OCBC Aquatic Centre
- Date: 7 June 2015
- Competitors: 15 from 8 nations

Medalists
gold medal	Joseph Isaac Schooling	Singapore
silver medal	Quah Zheng Wen	Singapore
bronze medal	Hoàng Quý Phước	Vietnam

The men's 100 metre freestyle competition of the swimming event at the 2015 SEA Games was held on 7 June at the OCBC Aquatic Centre in Kallang, Singapore.

== Records ==
Prior to this competition, the existing Asian and Games records were as follows:

Asian record	Ning Zetao (CHN)	47.70	Incheon, South Korea	25 September 2014
Games record	Triady Fauzi Sidiq (INA)	49.99	Naypyidaw, Myanmar	13 December 2013

The following records were established during the competition:

Date	Event	Name	Nationality	Time	Record
7 June	Final	Joseph Isaac Schooling	Singapore (SIN)	48.58	GR

== Schedule ==
All times are Singapore Standard Time (UTC+08:00)

Date	Time	Event
Sunday, 7 June 2015	09:03	Heat 1
Sunday, 7 June 2015	09:04	Heat 2
Sunday, 7 June 2015	19:04	Final

== Results ==
KEY:	q	Fastest non-qualifiers	Q	Qualified	GR	Games record	NR	National record	PB	Personal best	SB	Seasonal best

=== Heat 1 ===
Source: Heat 1 results

Heat 1 was held on 7 June.

Rank	Lane	Athletes	Time	Notes
1	4	Hoàng Quý Phước (VIE)	51.19	Q
2	5	Quah Zheng Wen (SIN)	51.46	Q
3	2	Napat Wesshasartar (THA)	51.66	Q
4	3	Tan Yean Yang Alwyn (MAS)	52.19	Q
5	7	Axel Toni Steven Ngui (PHI)	52.37	
6	6	Alexis Wijaya Ohmar (INA)	52.42	
7	1	Thoeun Thol (CAM)	1:01.25	

=== Heat 2 ===
Source: Heat 2 results

Heat 2 was held on 7 June.

Rank	Lane	Athletes	Time	Notes
1	5	Joseph Isaac Schooling (SIN)	50.03	Q
2	4	Triady Fauzi Sidiq (INA)	50.83	Q
3	6	Jessie Khing Lacuna (PHI)	51.51	Q
4	2	Krittamet Kumlue (THA)	52.23	Q
5	1	Pou Sovijja (CAM)	53.87	
6	8	Myat Thint (MYA)	1:00.58	
7	7	Trần Duy Khôi (VIE)	1:01.51	

=== Final ===
Source: Final Results

The final was held on 7 June.

Rank	Lane	Athletes	Time	Notes
1st place, gold medalist(s)	4	Joseph Isaac Schooling (SIN)	48.58	GR
2nd place, silver medalist(s)	6	Quah Zheng Wen (SIN)	49.91	
3rd place, bronze medalist(s)	3	Hoàng Quý Phước (VIE)	50.60	
4	5	Triady Fauzi Sidiq (INA)	50.67	
5	2	Jessie Khing Lacuna (PHI)	51.29	
6	7	Napat Wesshasartar (THA)	51.76	
7	1	Tan Yean Yang Alwyn (MAS)	51.81	
8	8	Krittamet Kumlue (THA)	52.30	
