= Swimming at the 2015 SEA Games – Men's 4 × 200 metre freestyle relay =

Swimming – Men's 4 x 200 metre freestyle relay at the 2015 SEA Games
- Venue: OCBC Aquatic Centre
- Date: 7 June 2015
- Competitors: 20 from 5 nations

Medalists
gold medal	Singapore (SIN)
silver medal	Malaysia (MAS)
bronze medal	Indonesia (INA)

The men's 4 x 200 metre freestyle relay competition of the swimming events at the 2015 SEA Games was held on 7 June at the OCBC Aquatic Centre in Singapore.

== Schedule ==
All times are Singapore Standard Time (UTC+08:00)

Date	Time	Event
Sunday, 7 June 2015	20:25	Final

== Records ==
Prior to this competition, the existing Asian and Games records were as follows:

Asian Record	Japan (JPN)	7:02.26	Rome, Italy	31 July 2009
Games Record	Singapore (SIN)	7:26.67	Naypyidaw, Myanmar	12 December 2013

The following records were established during the competition:

Date	Event	Name	Nation	Time	Record
7 June	Men's 200 m freestyle	Joseph Isaac Schooling	Singapore (SIN)	1:47.79	GR
7 June	Men's 4 × 200 m freestyle relay	Singapore (SIN)		7:18.14	GR

== Results ==
KEY:	GR	Games record	NR	National record	PB	Personal best	SB	Seasonal best

=== Final ===
Source: Final Results

The final was held on 7 June.

Rank	Lane	Team	Time	Notes
1st place, gold medalist(s)	4	Singapore (SIN): Joseph Isaac Schooling (1:47.79 GR); Yeo Kai Quan (1:50.45); Pang Sheng Jun (1:51.33); Quah Zheng Wen (1:48.57)	7:18.14	GR
2nd place, silver medalist(s)	5	Malaysia (MAS): Daniel William Henry Bego (1:53.01); Welson Sim Wee Sheng (1:51.23); Kevin Yeap Soon Choy (1:52.04); Lim Ching Hwang (1:53.85)	7:30.13	
3rd place, bronze medalist(s)	3	Indonesia (INA): Triady Fauzi Sidiq (1:54.28); Ricky Anggawidjaja (1:54.44); Aflah Fadlan Prawira (1:53.35); Satrio Bagaskara Gunadi Putra (1:53.56)	7:35.63	
4	6	Thailand (THA): Tanakrit Kittiya (1:53.13); Sarit Tiewong (1:54.05); Krittamet Kumlue (1:55.86); Jiarapong Sangkhawat (1:55.65)	7:38.69	NR
5	2	Philippines (PHI): Axel Toni Steven Ngui (1:55.36); Jose Joaquin Gonzalez (1:54.32); Aldrich McKirdy (2:00.33); Jessie Khing Lacuna (1:51.77)	7:41.78	
