= Swimming at the 2015 SEA Games – Women's 200 metre backstroke =

Swimming – Women's 200 metre backstroke at the 2015 SEA Games
- Venue: OCBC Aquatic Centre
- Date: 7 June 2015
- Competitors: 8 from 5 nations

Medalists
gold medal	Nguyễn Thị Ánh Viên	Vietnam
silver medal	Yessy Venesia Yosaputra	Indonesia
bronze medal	Roxanne Ashley Yu	Philippines

The women's 200 metre backstroke competition of the swimming event at the 2015 SEA Games was held on 7 June at the OCBC Aquatic Centre in Kallang, Singapore.

== Records ==
Prior to this competition, the existing Asian and Games records were as follows:

Asian record	Zhao Jing (CHN)	2:06.46	Guangzhou, China	14 November 2010
Games record	Nguyễn Thị Ánh Viên (VIE)	2:14.80	Naypyidaw, Myanmar	12 December 2013

The following records were established during the competition:

Date	Event	Name	Nationality	Time	Record
7 June	Final	Nguyễn Thị Ánh Viên	Vietnam (VIE)	2:14.12	GR

== Schedule ==
All times are Singapore Standard Time (UTC+08:00)

Date	Time	Event
Sunday, 7 June 2015	19:38	Final

== Results ==
KEY:	GR	Games record	NR	National record	PB	Personal best	SB	Seasonal best

=== Final ===
Source: Results Final

The final was held on 7 June.

Rank	Lane	Athletes	Time	Notes
1st place, gold medalist(s)	4	Nguyễn Thị Ánh Viên (VIE)	2:14.12	GR
2nd place, silver medalist(s)	5	Yessy Venesia Yosaputra (INA)	2:17.17	
3rd place, bronze medalist(s)	3	Roxanne Ashley Yu (PHI)	2:18.45	
4	8	Elizabeth Ann Jordana (PHI)	2:19.35	
5	2	Quek Jia Hui Hannah (SIN)	2:21.14	
6	7	Araya Wongvat (THA)	2:21.45	
7	1	Nurul Fajar Fitriyati (INA)	2:22.93	
8	6	Chantal Liew (SIN)	2:23.96	
