= Swimming at the 2015 SEA Games – Women's 100 metre freestyle =

Swimming – Women's 100 metre freestyle at the 2015 SEA Games
- Venue: OCBC Aquatic Centre
- Date: 8 June 2015
- Competitors: 14 from 9 nations

Medalists
gold medal	Quah Ting Wen	Singapore
silver medal	Nguyễn Thị Ánh Viên	Vietnam
bronze medal	Jasmine Alkhaldi	Philippines

The women's 100 metre freestyle competition of the swimming event at the 2015 SEA Games was held on 8 June at the OCBC Aquatic Centre in Kallang, Singapore.

== Records ==
Prior to this competition, the existing Asian and Games records were as follows:

Asian Record	Pang Jiaying (CHN)	53.13	Jinan, China	22 October 2009
Games Record	Quah Ting Wen (SIN)	56.03	Vientiane, Laos	10 December 2009

The following records were established during the competition:

Date	Event	Name	Nationality	Time	Record
8 June	Final	Quah Ting Wen	Singapore (SIN)	55.93	GR

== Schedule ==
All times are Singapore Standard Time (UTC+08:00)

Date	Time	Event
Monday, 8 June 2015	09:05	Heat 1
Monday, 8 June 2015	09:07	Heat 2
Monday, 8 June 2015	19:38	Final

== Results ==
KEY:	Q	Qualified	GR	Games record	NR	National record	PB	Personal best	SB	Seasonal best	WD	Withdrew	DNF	Did not finish

=== Heats ===
Source: Heats Results Summary

The heats were held on 8 June.

==== Heat 1 ====
Source: Heat 1 Results

Heat 1 was held on 8 June.

Rank	Lane	Athletes	Time	Notes
1	5	Jasmine Alkhaldi (PHI)	56.92	Q
2	3	Nguyễn Thị Ánh Viên (VIE)	57.17	Q
3	4	Lim Xiang Qi (SIN)	57.23	Q
4	6	Chui Lai Kwan (MAS)	58.34	Q
5	2	Kathriana Mella Gustianji (INA)	59.20	Q, WD
6	7	Oo Shun Lei Maw (MYA)	1:06.56	
7	1	Veomany Siriphone (LAO)	1:13.63	

==== Heat 2 ====
Source: Heat 2 Results

Heat 2 was held on 8 June.

Rank	Lane	Athletes	Time	Notes
1	4	Quah Ting Wen (SIN)	58.75	Q
2	3	Patricia Yosita Hapsari (INA)	58.78	Q
2	5	Natthanan Junkrajang (THA)	58.78	Q
4	2	Nguyễn Thị Diệu Linh (VIE)	59.28	Q
5	7	San Su Moe Theint (MYA)	1:01.54	
6	6	Benjaporn Sriphanomthorn (THA)	1:05.11	
7	1	Vitiny Hemthon (CAM)	1:06.15	

=== Final ===
Source: Final Results

The final was held on 8 June.

Rank	Lane	Athletes	Time	Notes
1st place, gold medalist(s)	2	Quah Ting Wen (SIN)	55.93	GR
2nd place, silver medalist(s)	5	Nguyễn Thị Ánh Viên (VIE)	56.05	
3rd place, bronze medalist(s)	4	Jasmine Alkhaldi (PHI)	56.10	
4	1	Natthanan Junkrajang (THA)	56.42	
5	3	Lim Xiang Qi (SIN)	56.66	
6	6	Chui Lai Kwan (MAS)	57.67	
7	7	Patricia Yosita Hapsari (INA)	57.88	
8	8	Nguyễn Thị Diệu Linh (VIE)	59.46	
