= Swimming at the 2015 SEA Games – Women's 50 metre freestyle =

Swimming – Women's 50 metre freestyle at the 2015 SEA Games
- Venue: OCBC Aquatic Centre
- Date: 11 June 2015
- Competitors: 13 from 9 nations

Medalists
gold medal	Lim Xiang Qi	Singapore
silver medal	Quah Ting Wen	Singapore
bronze medal	Jasmine Alkhaldi	Philippines

The women's 50 metre freestyle competition of the swimming event at the 2015 SEA Games was held on 11 June at the OCBC Aquatic Centre in Kallang, Singapore.

== Records ==
Prior to this competition, the existing Asian and Games records were as follows:

Asian Record	Le Jingyi (CHN)	24.51	Rome, Italy	11 September 1994
Games Record	Lim Xiang Qi (SIN)	25.69	Naypyidaw, Myanmar	16 December 2013

The following records were established during the competition:

Date	Event	Name	Nationality	Time	Record
11 June	Final	Lim Xiang Qi	Singapore (SIN)	25.59	GR

== Schedule ==
All times are Singapore Standard Time (UTC+08:00)

Date	Time	Event
Thursday, 11 June 2015	09:02	Heat 1
Thursday, 11 June 2015	09:03	Heat 2
Thursday, 11 June 2015	19:04	Final

== Results ==
KEY:	Q	Qualified	GR	Games record	NR	National record	PB	Personal best	SB	Seasonal best	WD	Withdrew	DNF	Did not finish

=== Heats ===
Source: Heats Results Summary

The heats were held on 11 June.

==== Heat 1 ====
Source: Heat 1 Results

Heat 1 was held on 11 June.

Rank	Lane	Athletes	Time	Notes
1	4	Quah Ting Wen (SIN)	26.01	Q
2	3	Jasmine Alkhaldi (PHI)	26.07	Q
3	5	Jenjira Srisa-Ard (THA)	26.10	Q
4	6	Patricia Yosita Hapsari (INA)	27.13	
5	2	San Su Moe Theint (MYA)	27.69	
6	7	Seng Samphors (CAM)	31.02	

==== Heat 2 ====
Source: Heat 2 Results

Heat 2 was held on 11 June.

Rank	Lane	Athletes	Time	Notes
1	6	Natthanan Junkrajang (THA)	26.39	Q
2	5	Lim Xiang Qi (SIN)	26.41	Q
2	3	Chui Lai Kwan (MAS)	26.55	Q
4	4	Nguyễn Diệp Phương Trâm (VIE)	26.97	Q
5	2	Anak Agung Istri Kania Ratih (INA)	27.10	Q
6	7	Hemthon Vitiny (CAM)	30.60	
7	1	Siriarun Budcharern (LAO)	34.34	

=== Final ===
Source: Final Results

The final was held on 11 June.

Rank	Lane	Athletes	Time	Notes
1st place, gold medalist(s)	2	Lim Xiang Qi (SIN)	25.59	GR
2nd place, silver medalist(s)	4	Quah Ting Wen (SIN)	25.60	
3rd place, bronze medalist(s)	5	Jasmine Alkhaldi (PHI)	25.79	
4	7	Chui Lai Kwan (MAS)	25.82	
5	3	Jenjira Srisa-Ard (THA)	25.88	
6	6	Natthanan Junkrajang (THA)	26.29	
7	1	Nguyễn Diệp Phương Trâm (VIE)	26.89	
8	8	Anak Agung Istri Kania Ratih (INA)	27.13	
