= Swimming at the 2015 SEA Games – Women's 200 metre butterfly =

Swimming – Women's 200 metre butterfly at the 2015 SEA Games
- Venue: OCBC Aquatic Centre
- Date: 9 June 2015
- Competitors: 10 from 6 nations

Medalists
gold medal	Nguyễn Thị Ánh Viên	Vietnam
silver medal	Quah Ting Wen	Singapore
bronze medal	Sutasinee Pankaew	Thailand

The women's 200 metre butterfly competition of the swimming event at the 2015 SEA Games will be held on 9 June at the OCBC Aquatic Centre in Kallang, Singapore.

== Records ==
Prior to this competition, the existing Asian and Games records were as follows:

Asian record	Liu Zige (CHN)	2:01.81	Jinan, China	21 October 2009
Games record	Tao Li (SIN)	2:13.49	Vientiane, Laos	14 December 2009

The following records were established during the competition:

Date	Event	Name	Nationality	Time	Record
9 June	Final	Nguyễn Thị Ánh Viên	Vietnam (VIE)	2:11.12	GR

== Schedule ==
All times are Singapore Standard Time (UTC+08:00)

Date	Time	Event
Tuesday, 9 June 2015	09:00	Heat 1
Tuesday, 9 June 2015	09:03	Heat 2
Tuesday, 9 June 2015	19:00	Final

== Results ==
KEY:	Q	Qualified	GR	Games record	NR	National record	PB	Personal best	SB	Seasonal best	WD	Withdrew	DNF	Did not finish

=== Heats ===
Source: Heats Results Summary

The heats were held on 9 June.

==== Heat 1 ====
Source: Results heat 1

Heat 1 was held on 9 June.

Rank	Lane	Athletes	Time	Notes
1	4	Monalisa Arieswaty Lorenza (INA)	2:18.36	Q
2	5	Lê Thị Mỹ Thảo (VIE)	2:20.03	Q
3	2	Tan Jing-E (SIN)	2:21.22	Q
4	3	Raina Saumi Graha Ramadhani (INA)	2:23.48	

==== Heat 2 ====
Source: Results heat 2

Heat 2 was held on 9 June.

Rank	Lane	Athletes	Time	Notes
1	5	Sutasinee Pankaew (THA)	2:18.02	Q
2	6	Patarawadee Kittiya (THA)	2:18.98	Q
3	4	Nguyễn Thị Ánh Viên (VIE)	2:19.34	Q
4	3	Quah Ting Wen (SIN)	2:19.91	Q
5	2	Hannah Dato (PHI)	2:19.92	Q
6	7	Oo Shun Lei Maw (MYA)	2:35.10	

=== Final ===
Source: Final Results

The final was held on 9 June.

Rank	Lane	Athletes	Time	Notes
1st place, gold medalist(s)	6	Nguyễn Thị Ánh Viên (VIE)	2:11.12	GR
2nd place, silver medalist(s)	2	Quah Ting Wen (SIN)	2:14.50	
3rd place, bronze medalist(s)	4	Sutasinee Pankaew (THA)	2:14.51	
4	5	Monalisa Arieswaty Lorenza (INA)	2:15.16	
5	3	Patarawadee Kittiya (THA)	2:15.41	
6	1	Lê Thị Mỹ Thảo (VIE)	2:16.61	
7	7	Hannah Dato (PHI)	2:18.47	
8	8	Tan Jing-E (SIN)	2:18.95	
