= Swimming at the 2015 SEA Games – Men's 200 metre butterfly =

Swimming – Men's 200 metre butterfly at the 2015 SEA Games
- Venue: OCBC Aquatic Centre
- Date: 8 June 2015
- Competitors: 10 from 7 nations

Medalists
gold medal	Joseph Isaac Schooling	Singapore
silver medal	Quah Zheng Wen	Singapore
bronze medal	Jessie Khing Lacuna	Philippines

The men's 200 metre butterfly competition of the swimming event at the 2015 SEA Games was held on 8 June at the OCBC Aquatic Centre in Kallang, Singapore.

== Records ==
Prior to this competition, the existing Asian and Games records were as follows:

Asian Record	Takeshi Matsuda (JPN)	1:52.97	Beijing, China	13 August 2008
Games Record	Joseph Isaac Schooling (SIN)	1:56.67	Palembang, Indonesia	15 November 2011

The following records were established during the competition:

Date	Event	Name	Nationality	Time	Record
8 June	Final	Joseph Isaac Schooling	Singapore (SIN)	1:55.73	GR

== Schedule ==
All times are Singapore Standard Time (UTC+08:00)

Date	Time	Event
Monday, 8 June 2015	09:11	Heat 1
Monday, 8 June 2015	09:14	Heat 2
Monday, 8 June 2015	20:29	Final

== Results ==
KEY:	Q	Qualified	GR	Games record	NR	National record	PB	Personal best	SB	Seasonal best	WD	Withdrew	DNF	Did not finish

=== Heats ===
Source: Heats Results Summary

The heats were held on 8 June.

==== Heat 1 ====
Source: Heat 1 Results

Heat 1 was held on 8 June.

Rank	Lane	Athletes	Time	Notes
1	4	Quah Zheng Wen (SIN)	2:07.73	Q
2	5	Muhammad Hamgari (INA)	2:08.23	Q
3	3	Jessie Khing Lacuna (PHI)	2:08.37	Q
4	6	Phan Gia Mẫn (VIE)	2:08.43	Q
5	2	Pou Sovijja (CAM)	2:11.63	

==== Heat 2 ====
Source: Heat 2 Results

Heat 2 was held on 8 June.

Rank	Lane	Athletes	Time	Notes
1	4	Joseph Isaac Schooling (SIN)	2:05.55	Q
2	3	Navaphat Wongcharoen (THA)	2:05.85	Q
3	6	Aldrich McKirdy (PHI)	2:09.69	Q
4	2	Kitiphat Pipimnan (THA)	2:11.55	Q
5	7	Myat Thint (MYA)	2:32.51	

=== Final ===
Source: Final Results

The final was held on 8 June.

Rank	Lane	Athletes	Time	Notes
1st place, gold medalist(s)	4	Joseph Isaac Schooling (SIN)	1:55.73	GR
2nd place, silver medalist(s)	3	Quah Zheng Wen (SIN)	1:56.79	
3rd place, bronze medalist(s)	2	Jessie Khing Lacuna (PHI)	2:00.89	
4	5	Navaphat Wongcharoen (THA)	2:02.39	
5	6	Muhammad Hamgari (INA)	2:03.81	
5	7	Phan Gia Mẫn (VIE)	2:03.81	
7	8	Kitiphat Pipimnan (THA)	2:06.21	
8	1	Aldrich McKirdy (PHI)	2:09.74	
