= Swimming at the 2015 SEA Games – Women's 50 metre breaststroke =

Swimming – Women's 50 metre breaststroke at the 2015 SEA Games
- Venue: OCBC Aquatic Centre
- Date: 10 June 2015
- Competitors: 12 from 8 nations

Medalists
gold medal	Ho Ru'En Roanne	Singapore
silver medal	Phee Jinq En	Malaysia
bronze medal	Erika Kong Chia Chia	Malaysia

The women's 50 metre breaststroke competition of the swimming event at the 2015 SEA Games was held on 10 June at the OCBC Aquatic Centre in Kallang, Singapore.

== Records ==
Prior to this competition, the existing Asian and Games records were as follows:

Asian Record	Chen Huijia (CHN)	30.46	Hong Kong, China	6 December 2009
Games Record	Christina Loh Yen Ling (MAS)	32.49	Palembang, Indonesia	17 November 2011

The following records were established during the competition:

Date	Event	Name	Nationality	Time	Record
10 June	Heat 2	Ho Ru'En Roanne	Singapore (SIN)	32.00	GR
10 June	Final	Ho Ru'En Roanne	Singapore (SIN)	31.45	GR

== Schedule ==
All times are Singapore Standard Time (UTC+08:00)

Date	Time	Event
Wednesday, 10 June 2015	09:02	Heat 1
Wednesday, 10 June 2015	09:03	Heat 2
Wednesday, 10 June 2015	19:04	Final

== Results ==
KEY:	Q	Qualified	GR	Games record	NR	National record	PB	Personal best	SB	Seasonal best	WD	Withdrew	DNF	Did not finish

=== Heats ===
Source: Heats Results Summary

The heats were held on 10 June.

==== Heat 1 ====
Source: Heat 1 Results

Heat 1 was held on 10 June.

Rank	Lane	Athletes	Time	Notes
1	4	Erika Kong Chia Chia (MAS)	32.54	Q
2	5	Samantha Louisa Ginn Yeo (SIN)	33.00	Q
3	3	Imelda Corazon Wistey (PHI)	33.46	Q
4	6	Chavunnooch Salubluek (THA)	33.77	Q
5	2	San Su Moe Theint (MYA)	36.23	
6	7	Hemthon Vitiny (CAM)	38.88	

==== Heat 2 ====
Source: Heat 2 Results

Heat 2 was held on 10 June.

Rank	Lane	Athletes	Time	Notes
1	5	Ho Ru'En Roanne (SIN)	32.00	Q, GR
2	4	Phee Jinq En (MAS)	32.50	Q
3	3	Phiangkhwan Pawapotako (THA)	33.39	Q
4	2	Ananda Treciel V. Evato (INA)	33.73	Q
5	6	Raissa Regatta Gavino (PHI)	34.30	
6	7	Siriarun Budcharern (LAO)	43.19	

=== Final ===
Source: Final Results

The final was held on 10 June.

Rank	Lane	Athletes	Time	Notes
1st place, gold medalist(s)	4	Ho Ru'En Roanne (SIN)	31.45	GR
2nd place, silver medalist(s)	5	Phee Jinq En (MAS)	32.46	
3rd place, bronze medalist(s)	3	Erika Kong Chia Chia (MAS)	32.58	
4	6	Samantha Louisa Ginn Yeo (SIN)	33.01	
5	1	Ananda Treciel V. Evato (INA)	33.83	
6	2	Phiangkhwan Pawapotako (THA)	33.90	
7	7	Imelda Corazon Wistey (PHI)	33.99	
8	8	Chavunnooch Salubluek (THA)	34.08	
