= Swimming at the 2015 SEA Games – Men's 4 × 100 metre freestyle relay =

Swimming – Men's 4 x 100 metre freestyle relay at the 2015 SEA Games
- Venue: OCBC Aquatic Centre
- Date: 9 June 2015
- Competitors: 20 from 5 nations

Medalists
gold medal	Singapore (SIN)
silver medal	Malaysia (MAS)
bronze medal	Indonesia (INA)

The men's 4 x 100 metre freestyle relay competition of the swimming events at the 2015 SEA Games was held on 9 June at the OCBC Aquatic Centre in Singapore.

== Schedule ==
All times are Singapore Standard Time (UTC+08:00)

Date	Time	Event
Tuesday, 9 June 2015	20:30	Final

== Records ==
Prior to this competition, the existing Asian and Games records were as follows:

Asian Record	China (CHN)	3:13.47	Incheon, South Korea	24 September 2014
Games Record	Singapore (SIN)	3:21.74	Naypyidaw, Myanmar	14 December 2013

The following records were established during the competition:

Date	Event	Team	Time	Record
9 June	Final	Singapore (SIN)	3:19.59	GR

== Results ==
KEY:	GR	Games record	NR	National record	PB	Personal best	SB	Seasonal best

=== Final ===
Source: Final Results

The final was held on 9 June.

Rank	Lane	Team	Time	Notes
1st place, gold medalist(s)	4	Singapore (SIN): Joseph Isaac Schooling (49.74); Yeo Kai Quan (50.56); Clement Lim Yong'En (49.81); Quah Zheng Wen (49.48)	3:19.59	GR
2nd place, silver medalist(s)	6	Malaysia (MAS): Tan Yean Yang Alwyn (51.63); Welson Sim Wee Sheng (51.26); Lim Ching Hwang (51.84); Daniel William Henry Bego (50.82)	3:25.55	
3rd place, bronze medalist(s)	5	Indonesia (INA): Triady Fauzi Sidiq (51.28); Alexis Wijaya Ohmar (52.04); Ricky Anggawidjaja (51.58); Glenn Victor Sutanto (51.02)	3:25.92	
4	3	Thailand (THA): Napat Wesshasartar (51.45); Kitiphat Pipimnan (52.15); Krittamet Kumlue (50.96); Sarit Tiewong (52.08)	3:26.64	NR
5	1	Cambodia (CAM): Pou Sovijja (53.80); Cheng Pirort (59.91); Hem Thonponloeu (1:00.07); Thouen Thol (1:00.57)	3:54.35	
