= Swimming at the 2015 SEA Games – Men's 50 metre butterfly =

Swimming – Men's 50 metre butterfly at the 2015 SEA Games
- Venue: OCBC Aquatic Centre
- Date: 10 June 2015
- Competitors: 10 from 7 nations

Medalists
gold medal	Joseph Isaac Schooling	Singapore
silver medal	Glenn Victor Sutanto	Indonesia
bronze medal	Quah Zheng Wen	Singapore

The men's 50 metre butterfly competition of the swimming event at the 2015 SEA Games was held on 10 June at the OCBC Aquatic Centre in Kallang, Singapore.

== Records ==
Prior to this competition, the existing Asian and Games records were as follows:

Asian Record	Yu Hexin (CHN)	23.37	Baoji, China	10 April 2015
Games Record	Joseph Isaac Schooling (SIN)	24.06	Palembang, Indonesia	12 November 2011

The following records were established during the competition:

Date	Event	Name	Nationality	Time	Record
10 June	Final	Joseph Isaac Schooling	Singapore (SIN)	23.49	GR

== Schedule ==
All times are Singapore Standard Time (UTC+08:00)

Date	Time	Event
Wednesday, 10 June 2015	09:00	Heat 1
Wednesday, 10 June 2015	09:01	Heat 2
Wednesday, 10 June 2015	19:00	Final

== Results ==
KEY:	Q	Qualified	GR	Games record	NR	National record	PB	Personal best	SB	Seasonal best	WD	Withdrew	DNF	Did not finish

=== Heats ===
Source: Heats Results Summary

The heats were held on 10 June.

==== Heat 1 ====
Source: Heat 1 Results

Heat 1 was held on 10 June.

Rank	Lane	Athletes	Time	Notes
1	4	Glenn Victor Sutanto (INA)	24.43	Q
2	3	Supakrid Pananuratana (THA)	24.64	Q, NR
3	5	Hoàng Quý Phước (VIE)	25.25	Q
4	6	Lim Odam (CAM)	28.63	
5	2	Slava Sihanouvong (LAO)	30.57	

==== Heat 2 ====
Source: Heat 2 Results

Heat 2 was held on 10 June.

Rank	Lane	Athletes	Time	Notes
1	4	Joseph Isaac Schooling (SIN)	24.80	Q
2	5	Triady Fauzi Sidiq (INA)	24.98	Q
3	3	Quah Zheng Wen (SIN)	25.28	Q
4	6	Gavin Alexander Lewis (THA)	26.76	Q
5	2	Myat Thint (MYA)	28.51	Q

=== Final ===
Source: Final Results

The final was held on 10 June.

Rank	Lane	Athletes	Time	Notes
1st place, gold medalist(s)	3	Joseph Isaac Schooling (SIN)	23.49	GR
2nd place, silver medalist(s)	4	Glenn Victor Sutanto (INA)	24.12	
3rd place, bronze medalist(s)	7	Quah Zheng Wen (SIN)	24.36	
4	6	Triady Fauzi Sidiq (INA)	24.53	
5	5	Supakrid Pananuratana (THA)	24.69	
6	2	Hoàng Quý Phước (VIE)	25.01	
7	1	Gavin Alexander Lewis (THA)	26.16	
8	8	Myat Thint (MYA)	28.43	
