= Swimming at the 2015 SEA Games – Women's 400 metre individual medley =

Swimming – Women's 400 metre individual medley at the 2015 SEA Games
- Venue: OCBC Aquatic Centre
- Dates: 6 June 2015
- Competitors: 9 from 7 nations

Medalists
gold medal	Nguyễn Thị Ánh Viên	Vietnam
silver medal	Pawapotako Phiangkhwan	Thailand
bronze medal	Quah Jing Wen	Singapore

The women's 400 metre individual medley competition of the swimming event at the 2015 SEA Games was held on 6 June at the OCBC Aquatic Centre in Kallang, Singapore.

== Records ==
Prior to this competition, the existing Asian and Games records were as follows:

Asian record	Ye Shiwen (CHN)	4:28.43	London, England	28 July 2012
Games record	Nguyễn Thị Ánh Viên (VIE)	4:43.93	Singapore	6 June 2015

The following records were established during the competition:

Date	Event	Name	Nationality	Time	Record
6 June	Final	Nguyễn Thị Ánh Viên	Vietnam	4:42.88	GR

== Schedule ==
Date	Time	Event
Saturday, 6 June 2015	09:19	Heat 1
Saturday, 6 June 2015	09:24	Heat 2
Saturday, 6 June 2015	19:53	Final

== Results ==
KEY:	q	Fastest non-qualifiers	Q	Qualified	GR	Games record	NR	National record	PB	Personal best	SB	Seasonal best

=== Heat 1 ===
Source: Results heat 1

The first round was held on 6 June.

Rank	Lane	Athletes	Time	Notes
1	5	Dewi Ressa Kania (INA)	5:03.14	Q
2	6	Tan Jing-E (SIN)	5:04.70	Q
3	3	Dato Hannah (PHI)	5:06.20	Q
	4	Khoo Cai Lin (MAS)	DNF	

=== Heat 2 ===
Source: Results heat 2

The second round was held on 6 June.

Rank	Lane	Athletes	Time	Notes
1	4	Nguyễn Thị Ánh Viên (VIE)	4:43.93	Q, GR
2	5	Pawapotako Phiangkhwan (THA)	5:00.43	Q
3	6	Quah Jing Wen (SIN)	5:06.98	Q
4	3	Nimdam Kanitta (THA)	5:10.16	Q
5	2	Oo Shun Lei Maw (MYA)	5:35.56	Q

=== Final ===
Source: Results Final

The final was held on 6 June.

Rank	Lane	Athletes	Time	Notes
1st place, gold medalist(s)	4	Nguyễn Thị Ánh Viên (VIE)	4:42.88	GR
2nd place, silver medalist(s)	5	Pawapotako Phiangkhwan (THA)	4:52.63	
3rd place, bronze medalist(s)	7	Quah Jing Wen (SIN)	4:59.52	
4	2	Dato Hannah (PHI)	5:00.96	
5	6	Tan Jing-E (SIN)	5:02.68	
6	1	Nimdam Kanitta (THA)	5:03.89	
7	3	Dewi Ressa Kania (INA)	5:04.46	
8	8	Oo Shun Lei Maw (MYA)	5:34.00	
