= Swimming at the 2015 SEA Games – Women's 50 metre butterfly =

Swimming – Women's 50 metre butterfly at the 2015 SEA Games
- Venue: OCBC Aquatic Centre
- Date: 7 June 2015
- Competitors: 13 from 8 nations

Medalists
gold medal	Tao Li	Singapore
silver medal	Quah Ting Wen	Singapore
bronze medal	Jasmine Alkhaldi	Philippines

The women's 50 metre butterfly competition of the swimming event at the 2015 SEA Games was held on 7 June at the OCBC Aquatic Centre in Kallang, Singapore.

== Records ==
Prior to this competition, the existing Asian and Games records were as follows:

Asian record	Lu Ying (CHN)	25.42	Barcelona, Spain	3 August 2013
Games record	Tao Li (SIN)	26.59	Palembang, Indonesia	17 November 2011

The following records were established during the competition:

Date	Event	Name	Nationality	Time	Record
7 June	Final	Tao Li	Singapore (SIN)	26.58	GR

== Schedule ==
All times are Singapore Standard Time (UTC+08:00)

Date	Time	Event
Sunday, 7 June 2015	09:00	Heat 1
Sunday, 7 June 2015	09:02	Heat 2
Sunday, 7 June 2015	19:00	Final

== Results ==
KEY:	q	Fastest non-qualifiers	Q	Qualified	GR	Games record	NR	National record	PB	Personal best	SB	Seasonal best

=== Heats ===
Source: Heats Results Summary

The heats were held on 7 June.

==== Heat 1 ====
Source: Results heat 1

Heat 1 was held on 7 June.

Rank	Lane	Athletes	Time	Notes
1	3	Nguyễn Thị Ánh Viên (VIE)	27.95	Q
2	4	Quah Ting Wen (SIN)	28.01	Q
3	6	Hannah Dato (PHI)	28.46	Q
4	2	Nurul Fajar Fitriyati (INA)	28.83	
5	5	Yap Siew Hui (MAS)	28.86	
6	7	San Su Moe Theint (MYA)	29.38	

==== Heat 2 ====
Source: Results heat 2

Heat 2 was held on 7 June.

Rank	Lane	Athletes	Time	Notes
1	4	Tao Li (SIN)	27.15	Q
2	6	Jasmine Alkhaldi (PHI)	27.56	Q
3	5	Jenjira Srisa-Ard (THA)	27.97	Q
4	2	Kornkarnjana Sapianchai (THA)	28.22	Q
5	3	Nguyễn Diệp Phương Châm (VIE)	28.40	Q
6	7	Kathriana Mella Gustianji (INA)	29.64	
7	1	Veomany Siriphone (LAO)	35.80	

=== Final ===
Source: Final Results

The final was held on 7 June.

Rank	Lane	Athletes	Time	Notes
1st place, gold medalist(s)	4	Tao Li (SIN)	26.58	GR
2nd place, silver medalist(s)	2	Quah Ting Wen (SIN)	27.02	
3rd place, bronze medalist(s)	5	Jasmine Alkhaldi (PHI)	27.47	
4	3	Nguyễn Thị Ánh Viên (VIE)	27.67	
5	6	Jenjira Srisa-Ard (THA)	27.69	
6	7	Kornkarnjana Sapianchai (THA)	27.77	
7	8	Hannah Dato (PHI)	27.91	
8	1	Nguyễn Diệp Phương Châm (VIE)	28.01	
