= Swimming at the 2015 SEA Games – Men's 200 metre freestyle =

Swimming – Men's 200 metre freestyle at the 2015 SEA Games
- Venue: OCBC Aquatic Centre
- Date: 6 June 2015
- Competitors: 13 from 7 nations

Medalists
gold medal	Hoàng Quý Phước	Vietnam
silver medal	Quah Zheng Wen	Singapore
bronze medal	Sim Wee Sheng Welson	Malaysia

The men's 200 metre freestyle event at the 2015 SEA Games took place on 6 June 2015 at the OCBC Aquatic Centre in Singapore.

There were 13 competitors from seven countries who took part in this event. Two heats were held. The heat in which a swimmer competed did not formally matter for advancement, as the swimmers with the top eight times from both field qualified for the finals.

== Records ==
Prior to this competition, the existing Asian and Games records were as follows:

Asian record	Sun Yang (CHN)	1:44.47	Shenyang, China	6 September 2013
Games record	Daniel Bego (MAS)	1:49.22	Vientiane, Laos	14 December 2009

The following records were established during the competition:

Date	Event	Name	Nationality	Time	Record
6 June	Final	Hoàng Quý Phước	Vietnam	1.48.96	GR

== Schedule ==
All times are Singapore Standard Time (UTC+08:00)

Date	Time	Event
Saturday, 6 June 2015	09:00	Heats
Saturday, 6 June 2015	19:00	Final

== Results ==
KEY:	q	Fastest non-qualifiers	Q	Qualified	GR	Games record	NR	National record	PB	Personal best	SB	Seasonal best

=== Heats ===
Source: Results Summary

The first round was held on 6 June.

Rank	Heats	Lane	Athletes	Time	Notes
1	1	3	Jessie Khing Lacuna (PHI)	1:52.78	Q
2	1	4	Sim Wee Sheng Welson (MAS)	1:52.86	Q
3	1	5	Quah Zheng Wen (SIN)	1:52.90	Q
4	2	5	Hoàng Quý Phước (VIE)	1:53.56	Q
5	1	6	Satrio Bagaskara Gunadi Putra (INA)	1:54.02	Q
6	2	4	Yeo Kai Quan Danny (SIN)	1:54.03	Q
7	2	6	Thanakrit Kittiya (THA)	1:54.11	Q
8	2	3	Lim Ching Hwang (MAS)	1:54.47	Q
9	2	2	Alexis Wijaya Ohmar (INA)	1:54.72	
10	1	2	Sarit Tiewong (THA)	1:54.98	
11	1	7	Axel Toni Steven Ngui (PHI)	1:55.65	
12	2	7	Lâm Quang Nhật (VIE)	1:58.77	
13	2	1	Sovijja Pou (CAM)	1:59.83	

=== Final ===
Source: Results Final

The final was held on 6 June.

Rank	Lane	Athlete	Time	Notes
1st place, gold medalist(s)	6	Hoàng Quý Phước (VIE)	1:48.96	GR
2nd place, silver medalist(s)	3	Quah Zheng Wen (SIN)	1:49.17	NR
3rd place, bronze medalist(s)	5	Sim Wee Sheng Welson (MAS)	1:50.73	
4	4	Jessie Khing Lacuna (PHI)	1:50.82	NR
5	7	Yeo Kai Quan Danny (SIN)	1:51.10	
6	8	Lim Ching Hwang (MAS)	1:53.23	
7	1	Thanakrit Kittiya (THA)	1:53.23	
8	2	Satrio Bagaskara Gunadi Putra (INA)	1:54.38	
