= Roxanne Yu =

Filipino swimmer

Roxanne Ashley Yu
Personal information
- Full name: Roxanne Ashley L. Yu
- Nicknames: Rox, Roxy
- Nationality: (Philippines) Filipino
- Born: 14 May 1997 (age 29) Manila
- Height: 5 ft 3 in (160 cm)
- Weight: 121 lb (55 kg)

Sport
- Sport: Swimming
- Strokes: Backstroke
Medal record
Women's swimming
Representing Philippines
Event	1st	2nd	3rd
Southeast Asian Games	0	0	4
Total	0	0	4
Southeast Asian Games
Bronze medal – third place	2015 Singapore	100 m backstroke
Bronze medal – third place	2015 Singapore	200 m backstroke
Bronze medal – third place	2015 Singapore	4 x 100 m medley relay
Bronze medal – third place	2017 Kuala Lumpur	200 m backstroke

Roxanne Ashley Yu is a Filipino swimmer who represents the Philippines.

== Swimming career ==
Yu would win three bronze medals in the 2015 Southeast Asian Games in Singapore. Her three bronze medals came in the 100 m backstroke, the 200 m backstroke, and the 4 x 100 m medley relay, where she teamed up with Hannah Dato, Imelda Corazon Wistey, and 2012 Olympian Jasmine Alkhaldi to a medal finish with a new national record of 4:16.19. Yu would also compete in the 50 m backstroke and the 4 x 100 m freestyle relay, but failed to qualify for the final in the former and finishing 4th in the latter.
