= Ressa Kania Dewi =

Indonesian swimmer (born 1994)

Personal information
- Born: 15 September 1994 (age 31) Bandung, West Java, Indonesia

Sport
- Sport: Swimming
Medal record
Women's swimming
Islamic Solidarity Games
Silver medal – second place	2017 Baku	400 m freestyle
Silver medal – second place	2017 Baku	4x100 m freestyle
Silver medal – second place	2017 Baku	4x200 m freestyle
Bronze medal – third place	2013 Palembang	4x100 m freestyle
Bronze medal – third place	2013 Palembang	4x200 m freestyle
SEA Games
Silver medal – second place	2013 Naypyidaw	400 m medley
Silver medal – second place	2013 Naypyidaw	4x200 m freestyle
Bronze medal – third place	2011 Jakarta–Palembang	200 m medley
Bronze medal – third place	2011 Jakarta–Palembang	400 m medley
Bronze medal – third place	2011 Jakarta–Palembang	4x200 m freestyle
Bronze medal – third place	2013 Naypyidaw	4x100 m freestyle
Bronze medal – third place	2015 Singapore	4x200 m freestyle
Bronze medal – third place	2017 Kuala Lumpur	200 m medley
Bronze medal – third place	2021 Vietnam	4x100 m freestyle
Bronze medal – third place	2021 Vietnam	4x200 m freestyle
Southeast Asian Championships
Silver medal – second place	2012 Singapore	4x100 m freestyle
Silver medal – second place	2012 Singapore	4x200 m freestyle
Bronze medal – third place	2012 Singapore	400 m medley
ASEAN University Games
Gold medal – first place	2016 Singapore	200 m medley
Gold medal – first place	2018 Naypyidaw	200 m freestyle
Gold medal – first place	2018 Naypyidaw	400 m freestyle
Gold medal – first place	2018 Naypyidaw	100 m butterfly
Gold medal – first place	2018 Naypyidaw	200 m medley
Gold medal – first place	2018 Naypyidaw	400 m medley
Gold medal – first place	2018 Naypyidaw	4x100 m freestyle
Silver medal – second place	2014 Palembang	200 m freestyle
Silver medal – second place	2016 Singapore	200 m breaststroke
Silver medal – second place	2016 Singapore	400 m medley
Women's finswimming
World Cup Series
Gold medal – first place	2023 Lignano Sabbiadoro	4x100 m bi-fins
SEA Games
Gold medal – first place	2023 Cambodia	4x100 m bi-fins
Silver medal – second place	2023 Cambodia	100 m bi-fins
Bronze medal – third place	2023 Cambodia	50 m bi-fins

Ressa Kania Dewi (born 15 September 1994) is an Indonesian swimmer. She competed in the women's 200 metre freestyle event at the 2017 World Aquatics Championships held in Budapest, Hungary.

== Career ==
In 2018, she competed in the women's 200 metre freestyle, 800 metre freestyle and 1500 metre freestyle events at the 2018 Asian Games held in Jakarta, Indonesia. She also competed in the women's 200 metre individual medley and 400 metre individual medley events. She also represented Indonesia in two relay events: the women's 4 × 100 metre freestyle relay and 4 × 200 metre freestyle relay events.
