= Ammiga Himathongkom =

Thai swimmer (born 1996)

Personal information
- Nationality: Thai
- Born: 29 November 1996 (age 29)

Sport
- Sport: Swimming

Ammiga Himathongkom (born 29 November 1996) is a Thai swimmer.

In 2018, she represented Thailand at the 2018 Asian Games held in Jakarta, Indonesia.

In 2019, she represented Thailand at the 2019 World Aquatics Championships held in Gwangju, South Korea. She competed in the women's 800 metre freestyle event and she did not advance to compete in the final.
