= Indra Gunawan (swimmer) =

Indonesian swimmer

Personal information
- Born: 21 March 1988 (age 38) Pematangsiantar, North Sumatra, Indonesia

Sport
- Sport: Swimming
Medal record
Men's swimming
Representing Indonesia
Islamic Solidarity Games
Bronze medal – third place	2017 Baku	50 m breaststroke
SEA Games
Gold medal – first place	2009 Vientiane	4×100 m medley
Gold medal – first place	2011 Palembang	50 m breaststroke
Gold medal – first place	2011 Jakarta–Palembang	4×100 m medley
Gold medal – first place	2015 Singapore	50 m breaststroke
Gold medal – first place	2017 Kuala Lumpur	50 m breaststroke
Silver medal – second place	2009 Vientiane	100 m breaststroke
Silver medal – second place	2011 Jakarta–Palembang	200 m breaststroke
Silver medal – second place	2013 Naypyidaw	100 m breaststroke
Silver medal – second place	2015 Singapore	4×100 m medley
Bronze medal – third place	2009 Vientiane	200 m breaststroke
Bronze medal – third place	2011 Jakarta–Palembang	100 m breaststroke

Indra Gunawan (born 21 March 1988) is an Indonesian swimmer. He competed in the men's 50 metre breaststroke event at the 2017 World Aquatics Championships.
