= Glenn Victor Sutanto =

Indonesian swimmer

Glenn Sutanto
Personal information
- Full name: Glenn Victor Sutanto
- Born: 7 November 1989 (age 36) Bandung, West Java, Indonesia
- Height: 6 ft 0 in (183 cm)
- Weight: 163 lb (74 kg)
- Spouse: Adeline Makhmutova
- Children: 1

Sport
- Country: Indonesia
- Sport: Swimming
- Strokes: Backstroke, freestyle, butterfly
Medal record
Men's swimming
Representing Indonesia
Event	1st	2nd	3rd
Asian Indoor and Martial Arts Games	0	1	1
SEA Games	3	10	7
Southeast Asian Championships	4	1	0
ASEAN University Games	4	2	0
Asian Indoor and Martial Arts Games
Silver medal – second place	2013 Incheon	100 m butterfly
Bronze medal – third place	2013 Incheon	50 m butterfly
SEA Games
Gold medal – first place	2009 Vientiane	100 m backstroke
Gold medal – first place	2009 Vientiane	4×100 m medley
Gold medal – first place	2011 Jakarta–Palembang	4×100 m medley
Silver medal – second place	2007 Nakhon Ratchasima	100 m backstroke
Silver medal – second place	2007 Nakhon Ratchasima	4×100 m medley
Silver medal – second place	2011 Jakarta–Palembang	50 m backstroke
Silver medal – second place	2011 Jakarta–Palembang	100 m backstroke
Silver medal – second place	2011 Jakarta–Palembang	50 m butterfly
Silver medal – second place	2011 Jakarta–Palembang	100 m butterfly
Silver medal – second place	2015 Singapore	50 m butterfly
Silver medal – second place	2015 Singapore	100 m butterfly
Silver medal – second place	2015 Singapore	4×100 m medley
Silver medal – second place	2021 Vietnam	4×100 m freestyle
Bronze medal – third place	2009 Vientiane	4×100 m freestyle
Bronze medal – third place	2013 Naypyidaw	100 m butterfly
Bronze medal – third place	2015 Singapore	4×100 m freestyle
Bronze medal – third place	2017 Kuala Lumpur	100 m butterfly
Bronze medal – third place	2017 Kuala Lumpur	4×100 m medley
Bronze medal – third place	2019 Philippines	50 m butterfly
Bronze medal – third place	2021 Vietnam	50 m butterfly
Southeast Asian Championships
Gold medal – first place	2012 Singapore	50 m butterfly
Gold medal – first place	2012 Singapore	100 m butterfly
Gold medal – first place	2012 Singapore	4x100 m freestyle
Gold medal – first place	2012 Singapore	4x100 m medley
Silver medal – second place	2012 Singapore	50 m backstroke
ASEAN University Games
Gold medal – first place	2012 Vientiane	50 m butterfly
Gold medal – first place	2012 Vientiane	4x200 m freestyle
Gold medal – first place	2012 Vientiane	4x100 m medley
Gold medal – first place	2014 Palembang	4x100 m freestyle
Silver medal – second place	2014 Palembang	50 m butterfly
Silver medal – second place	2014 Palembang	100 m butterfly

Glenn Victor Sutanto (born 7 November 1989) is an Indonesian competition swimmer who competes in the Backstroke, freestyle and butterfly events. He competed in the 2016 Summer Olympics in the 100 metre butterfly category, where he ranked 35 in the heats.

== Filmography ==
=== Web shows ===
Year	Title	Role	Notes	Ref.
2025	Physical: Asia	Contestant	Netflix	
