= Lâm Quang Nhật =

Vietnamese swimmer

Medal record

Representing Vietnam

Men's swimming

Southeast Asian Games
Gold medal – first place	2015 Singapore	1500 m freestyle
Gold medal – first place	2013 Naypyidaw	1500 m freestyle
Silver medal – second place	2017 Kuala Lumpur	1500 m freestyle

Lâm Quang Nhật (born August 29, 1997, in Ho Chi Minh City, Vietnam) is a Vietnamese triathlete. He was a swimmer who won a gold medal at the 2013 Southeast Asian Games in 1500 m freestyle. He currently holds Vietnamese records in swimming in 800m freestyle, 1500m freestyle, 4 × 100 m freestyle relay and 4 × 200 m freestyle relay.
