= Kasipat Chograthin =

Thai swimmer (born 1994)

Personal information
- Nationality: Thai
- Born: 24 September 1994 (age 31)

Sport
- Sport: Swimming

Kasipat Chograthin (born 24 September 1994) is a Thai swimmer. He competed in the men's 50 metre backstroke event at the 2018 FINA World Swimming Championships (25 m), in Hangzhou, China. In 2019, he competed in two events at the 2019 World Aquatics Championships held in Gwangju, South Korea.
