= Aflah Fadlan Prawira =

Indonesian swimmer (born 1997)

Aflah Fadlan Prawira OLY
Personal information
- National team: Indonesia
- Born: 13 November 1997 (age 28) Cirebon, Indonesia

Sport
- Sport: Swimming
Medal record
Men's swimming
Representing Indonesia
Islamic Solidarity Games
| Silver medal – second place | 2017 Baku | 400 m freestyle |
| Silver medal – second place | 2017 Baku | 800 m freestyle |
| Silver medal – second place | 2017 Baku | 1500 m freestyle |
| Silver medal – second place | 2017 Baku | 4×100 m freestyle |
| Silver medal – second place | 2017 Baku | 4×200 m freestyle |
| Bronze medal – third place | 2017 Baku | 400 m ind. medley |
| Bronze medal – third place | 2021 Konya | 800 m freestyle |
| Bronze medal – third place | 2021 Konya | 1500 m freestyle |
| Bronze medal – third place | 2021 Konya | 4×200 m freestyle |
SEA Games
| Silver medal – second place | 2015 Singapore | 1500 m freestyle |
| Silver medal – second place | 2017 Kuala Lumpur | 400 m freestyle |
| Silver medal – second place | 2017 Kuala Lumpur | 400 m ind. medley |
| Silver medal – second place | 2019 Philippines | 1500 m freestyle |
| Silver medal – second place | 2019 Philippines | 400 m ind. medley |
| Silver medal – second place | 2021 Vietnam | 4×100 m freestyle relay |
| Bronze medal – third place | 2015 Singapore | 4×200 m freestyle |
| Bronze medal – third place | 2017 Kuala Lumpur | 1500 m freestyle |
| Bronze medal – third place | 2017 Kuala Lumpur | 10 km open water |
| Bronze medal – third place | 2019 Philippines | 400 m freestyle |
| Bronze medal – third place | 2021 Vietnam | 400 m ind. medley |
ASEAN University Games
| Gold medal – first place | 2018 Naypyidaw | 1500 m freestyle |
| Gold medal – first place | 2018 Naypyidaw | 200 m butterfly |

Aflah Fadlan Prawira (born 13 November 1997) is an Indonesian swimmer. He competed in the men's 400 metre freestyle event at the 2017 World Aquatics Championships. He also competed in the 2020 Summer Olympics competing in two events but got eliminated in both events.
