= Ricky Anggawijaya =

Indonesian swimmer

Personal information
- Nationality: Indonesia
- Born: May 23, 1996 (age 30) Bandung, West Java, Indonesia
- Height: 171 cm (5 ft 7 in)

Sport
- Sport: Swimming
- Strokes: Backstroke, Freestyle
Medal record
Men's swimming
Representing Indonesia
Islamic Solidarity Games
Silver medal – second place	2017 Baku	4x100 m freestyle
Silver medal – second place	2017 Baku	4x200 m freestyle
Bronze medal – third place	2017 Baku	200 m backstroke
SEA Games
Gold medal – first place	2013 Naypyidaw	200 m backstroke
Silver medal – second place	2011 Jakarta	Men's 5 km – Open water swimming
Silver medal – second place	2011 Jakarta	Men's 10 km – Open water swimming
Bronze medal – third place	2013 Naypyidaw	100 m backstroke
Bronze medal – third place	2013 Naypyidaw	4x200 m freestyle
Bronze medal – third place	2015 Singapore	200 m backstroke
Bronze medal – third place	2015 Singapore	4x100 m freestyle
Bronze medal – third place	2015 Singapore	4x200 m freestyle
Bronze medal – third place	2017 Kuala Lumpur	200 m backstroke
Bronze medal – third place	2017 Kuala Lumpur	4x100 m freestyle
Southeast Asian Championships
Gold medal – first place	2014 Singapore	200 m backstroke
Asian Age Group Championships
Gold medal – first place	2015 Bangkok	200 m backstroke
Silver medal – second place	2015 Bangkok	100 m backstroke
Silver medal – second place	2015 Bangkok	200 m freestyle
Silver medal – second place	2015 Bangkok	4x100 m freestyle
Bronze medal – third place	2015 Bangkok	Mixed 4x100 m freestyle
ASEAN University Games
Gold medal – first place	2016 Singapore	200 m backstroke
Gold medal – first place	2016 Singapore	4x100 m freestyle
Gold medal – first place	2016 Singapore	4x100 m medley
Gold medal – first place	2018 Naypyidaw	200 m backstroke
Gold medal – first place	2018 Naypyidaw	4x100 m medley
Silver medal – second place	2016 Singapore	50 m backstroke
Silver medal – second place	2016 Singapore	100 m backstroke
Silver medal – second place	2018 Naypyidaw	4x100 m freestyle
Silver medal – second place	2018 Naypyidaw	4x200 m freestyle
Bronze medal – third place	2016 Singapore	200 m freestyle
Bronze medal – third place	2018 Naypyidaw	100 m backstroke
Asian Youth Games
Gold medal – first place	2013 Nanjing	100 m backstroke
Silver medal – second place	2013 Nanjing	200 m backstroke
ASEAN School Games
Gold medal – first place	2014 Marikina	100 m backstroke

Ricky Anggawijaya (born May 23, 1996) is an Indonesian swimmer from Bandung, West Java. He specializes in backstroke. His first medal in a multi-sport event was a silver medal, which he won in the 5,000 meter open water swimming event, at the 2011 Southeast Asian Games. He also won another silver in the same discipline, this time in 10000 m distance.

He then competed at the 2013 Asian Youth Games, held in Nanjing, China. Competing in three events, he won gold in the 100 m backstroke and silver in the 200 m backstroke. In his second participation at the 2013 Southeast Asian Games, he won gold in the 200 m backstroke. He also won two bronze medals, one in the 100 m backstroke, and the other in the 4 × 200 m freestyle relay with fellow Indonesian swimmers.
