= Trần Duy Khôi =

Vietnamese swimmer

Personal information
- Full name: Trần Duy Khôi
- Nationality: Vietnamese
- Born: July 20, 1997 (age 29) District 1, Ho Chi Minh City
- Height: 1.80 m (5 ft 11 in)
- Weight: 68 kg (150 lb)

Sport
- Country: Vietnam
- Sport: Swimming
- Events: Freestyle, backstroke, individual medley
Medal record
Representing Vietnam
Men's swimming
Asian Youth Games
Bronze medal – third place	2013 Nanjing	200 m IM
Asian Indoor and Martial Arts Games
Silver medal – second place	2013 Incheon	200 m IM
Southeast Asian Championships
Silver medal – second place	2014 Singapore	100 m backstroke
Silver medal – second place	2014 Singapore	400 m IM
Bronze medal – third place	2014 Singapore	50 m backstroke
Bronze medal – third place	2014 Singapore	200 m backstroke
Bronze medal – third place	2014 Singapore	4x100 m medley relay
Southeast Asian Games
Silver medal – second place	2013 Myanmar	200 m IM
Silver medal – second place	2015 Singapore	200 m backstroke
Bronze medal – third place	2013 Myanmar	400 m IM
Bronze medal – third place	2015 Singapore	100 m backstroke

Trần Duy Khôi (born 20 July 1997, in District 1, Ho Chi Minh City) is a national-record holding swimmer from Vietnam. He swam for Vietnam at the 2014 Asian Games. At the 2014 Asian Games, he swam the Backstroke events and the Individual Medley events. He qualified prelim of 400m Individual Medley, completed this events with 7th position and broke himself national record with time 4 minutes 24.54 seconds.
