= Aquatics at the 2019 SEA Games =

- The NCC Aquatics Center, the main venue
- Venue: New Clark City Aquatics Center, New Clark City, Capas, Tarlac (for diving, swimming, and water polo); Hanjin Boat Terminal, Cubi Point, Morong, Bataan (for open water swimming)
- Dates: 26 November – 10 December
- Nations: 11

Aquatics at the 2019 Southeast Asian Games are being held from 26 November to 10 December 2019.

Diving, swimming, and water polo events take place at the New Clark City Aquatics Center within New Clark City in Capas, Tarlac. Water polo events were held from 26 November to 1 December 2019, while diving and swimming events were held from 4 to 9 December 2019. The open water (swimming) event will take place on 10 December 2019 at the Hanjin Boat Terminal, Cubi Point along Subic Bay in Morong, Bataan.

== Diving ==
=== Men ===
| Event | Gold | | Silver | | Bronze | |
|---|---|---|---|---|---|---|
| 3m Springboard | Ooi Tze Liang; Malaysia | 454.60 | Puteh Muhammad; Malaysia | 402.50 | Mark Lee Han Ming; Singapore | 325.50 |
| 3m Springboard (Sync) | Ooi Tze Liang - Chew Yi Wei; Malaysia | 398.16 | Chawanwat Juntaphadawon - Thitipoom Marksin; Thailand | 344.76 | Timothy Lee Han Kuan - Mark Lee Han Ming; Singapore | 340.53 |

=== Women ===
| Event | Gold | | Silver | | Bronze | |
|---|---|---|---|---|---|---|
| 3m Springboard | Ng Yan Yee; Malaysia | 235.90 | Jasmine Lai Pui Yee; Malaysia | 192.75 | Ngo Phuong Mai; Vietnam | 185.25 |
| 3m Springboard (Sync) | Ng Yan Yee - Nur Dhabitah Sabri; Malaysia | 270.00 | Fong Kay Yian - Tan Yi Xuan Ashlee; Singapore | 232.86 | Booranapol Surincha - Yanmongkon Ramanya; Thailand | 208.14 |

== Open water swimming ==
| Event | Gold | Silver | Bronze |
|---|---|---|---|
| Men's 10K | Trần Tấn Triệu; Vietnam | Nguyễn Huy Hoàng; Vietnam | Tanakrit Kittiya; Thailand |

== Swimming ==
=== Men ===
| Event | Gold | | Silver | | Bronze | |
|---|---|---|---|---|---|---|
| 50 m freestyle | Jonathan Tan; Singapore | 22.25 MR | Teong Tzen Wei; Singapore | 22.40 | Luke Michael Gebbie; Philippines | 22.62 |
| 100 m freestyle | Darren Chua; Singapore | 49.59 | Joseph Schooling; Singapore | 49.64 | Hoàng Quý Phước; Vietnam | 50.08 |
| 200 m freestyle | Darren Chua; Singapore | 1:48.26 | Welson Sim; Malaysia | 1:48.52 | Hoàng Quý Phước; Vietnam | 1:48.59 |
| 400 m freestyle | Nguyễn Huy Hoàng; Vietnam | 3:49.08; MR | Welson Sim; Malaysia | 3:49.55 | Aflah Fadlan Prawira; Indonesia | 3:52.65 |
| 1500 m freestyle | Nguyễn Huy Hoàng; Vietnam | 14:58.14; MR, NR | Aflah Fadlan Prawira; Indonesia | 15:15.77; NR | Nguyễn Hữu Kim Sơn; Vietnam | 15:18.87 |
| 50 m backstroke | I Gede Siman Sudartawa; Indonesia | 25.12; MR | Quah Zheng Wen; Singapore | 25.65 | Lê Nguyễn Paul; Vietnam | 25.73 |
| 100 m backstroke | Quah Zheng Wen; Singapore | 53.79; MR, NR | Lê Nguyễn Paul; Vietnam | 54.98; NR | I Gede Siman Sudartawa; Indonesia | 55.68 |
| 200 m backstroke | Quah Zheng Wen; Singapore | 2:00.06; MR | Farrel Armando Tangkas; Indonesia | 2:02.75 | Khiew Hoe Yean; Malaysia | 2:03.89 |
| 50 m breaststroke | Lionel Khoo; Singapore | 28.15 | James Deiparine; Philippines | 28.32 | Gagarin Nathaniel; Indonesia | 28.52 |
| 100 m breaststroke | James Deiparine; Philippines | 1:01.46; MR, NR | Phạm Thanh Bảo; Vietnam | 1:01.92 | Lionel Khoo; Singapore | 1:01.98 |
| 200 m breaststroke | Nuttapong Ketin; Thailand | 2:12.57; MR NR | Phạm Thanh Bảo; Vietnam | 2:12.84; NR | Maximillian Ang Wei; Singapore | 2:13.96; NR |
| 50 m butterfly | Teong Tzen Wei; Singapore | 23.55 | Joseph Schooling; Singapore | 23.61 | Glenn Victor Sutanto; Indonesia | 23.84; NR |
| 100 m butterfly | Joseph Schooling; Singapore | 51.84 | Quah Zheng Wen; Singapore | 51.87 | Lê Nguyễn Paul; Vietnam | 53.89 |
| 200 m butterfly | Quah Zheng Wen; Singapore | 1:56.61 | Navaphat Wongcharoen; Thailand | 2:00.31 | Ong Jung Yi; Singapore | 2:00.53 |
| 200 m individual medley | Trần Hưng Nguyên; Vietnam | 2:02.56; NR | Darren Chua; Singapore | 2:02.73 | Triady Fauzi Sidiq; Indonesia | 2:02.81 |
| 400 m individual medley | Trần Hưng Nguyên; Vietnam | 4:20.65; MR NR | Aflah Fadlan Prawira; Indonesia | 4:21.30; NR | Nguyễn Hữu Kim Sơn; Vietnam | 4:26.45 |
| 4×100 m freestyle relay | Singapore (SGP); Darren Chua (50.05); Jonathan Tan (49.10); Quah Zheng Wen (48.40); Joseph Schooling (49.27) | 3:16.82; MR | Philippines (PHI); Luke Miguel Gebbie; Maurice Sacho Ilustre; Jean Pierre Sameh Khouzam; Jarod Jason Hatch | 3:22.32; NR | Vietnam (VIE); Hoàng Quý Phước; Lê Nguyễn Paul; Ngô Đình Chuyền; Trần Hưng Nguyên | 3:22.45; NR |
| 4×200 m freestyle relay | Singapore (SGP); Quah Zheng Wen (1:48.50); Joseph Schooling (1:49.91); Jonathan Tan (1:51.15); Darren Chua (1:48.32) | 7:17.88; MR | Vietnam (VIE); Hoàng Quý Phước (1:49.61); Nguyễn Hữu Kim Sơn (1:50.68); Ngô Đình Chuyền (1:50.77); Nguyễn Huy Hoàng (1:50.45) | 7:21.51; NR | Malaysia (MAS); Khiew Hoe Yean (1:52.34); Welson Sim (1:48.93); Arvin Singh Chahal (1:51.46); Keith Lim (1:54.82) | 7:27.55 |
| 4×100 m medley relay | Singapore (SGP); Quah Zheng Wen; Lionel Khoo; Joseph Schooling; Darren Chua | 3:38.63 | Indonesia (INA); I Gede Siman Sudartawa; Triady Fauzi Sidiq; Gagarin Nathaniel; Glenn Victor Sutanto | 3:43.27 | Vietnam (VIE); Ngô Đình Chuyền; Hoàng Quý Phước; Phạm Thanh Bảo; Trần Hưng Nguyên | 3:44.36 |

=== Women ===
| Event | Gold | | Silver | | Bronze | |
|---|---|---|---|---|---|---|
| 50 m freestyle | Amanda Lim; Singapore | 25.06; MR | Jenjira Srisa-Ard; Thailand | 25.32; NR | Jasmine Alkhaldi; Philippines | 25.48; NR |
| 100 m freestyle | Quah Ting Wen; Singapore | 54.74; MR | Cherlyn Yeoh; Singapore | 55.55 | Jasmine Alkhaldi; Philippines | 55.76; NR |
| 200 m freestyle | Nguyễn Thị Ánh Viên; Vietnam | 2:00.75 | Natthanan Junkrajang; Thailand | 2:00.93 | Remedy Rule; Philippines | 2:01.64 |
| 400 m freestyle | Nguyễn Thị Ánh Viên; Vietnam | 4:13.20 | Gan Ching Hwee; Singapore | 4:14.56 | Natthanan Junkrajang; Thailand | 4:17.59 |
| 800 m freestyle | Gan Ching Hwee; Singapore | 8:41.48 | Nguyễn Thị Ánh Viên; Vietnam | 8:48.65 | Kamonchanok Kwanmuang; Thailand | 8:50.23 |
| 50 m backstroke | Elena Lee; Singapore | 29.40 | Nguyễn Thị Ánh Viên; Vietnam | 29.64 | Anak Agung Istri Kania Ratih; Indonesia | 29.77 |
| 100 m backstroke | Nguyễn Thị Ánh Viên; Vietnam | 1:02.97 | Chloe Isleta; Philippines | 1:03.87 | Jasmine Alkhaldi; Philippines | 1:04.08 |
| 200 m backstroke | Nguyễn Thị Ánh Viên; Vietnam | 2:15.32 | Nurul Fajar Fitriyati; Indonesia | 2:17.84 | Chloe Isleta; Philippines | 2:18.48 |
| 50 m breaststroke | Phee Jinq En; Malaysia | 31.40; NR | Jenjira Srisa-Ard; Thailand | 31.41; NR | Christie Chue; Singapore | 31.43 |
| 100 m breaststroke | Phee Jinq En; Malaysia | 1:08.50; MR NR | Christie Chue; Singapore | 1:09.06; NR | Nisha Kukanakorn; Thailand | 1:10.70 |
| 200 m breaststroke | Christie Chue; Singapore | 2:28.71; MR NR | Phiangkhwan Pawapotako; Thailand | 2:31.47 | Phee Jinq En; Malaysia | 2:32.38 |
| 50 m butterfly | Quah Ting Wen; Singapore | 26.50 | Jenjira Srisa-Ard; Thailand | 26.64; NR | Jasmine Alkhaldi; Philippines | 27.09; NR |
| 100 m butterfly | Quah Ting Wen; Singapore | 59.62 | Quah Jing Wen; Singapore | 59.73 | Jasmine Alkhaldi; Philippines | 1:00.39; NR |
| 200 m butterfly | Quah Jing Wen; Singapore | 2:10.97; MR | Remedy Rule; Philippines | 2:10.99; NR | Lê Thị Mỹ Thảo; Vietnam | 2:12.70 |
| 200 m individual medley | Nguyễn Thị Ánh Viên; Vietnam | 2:15.51 | Azzahra Permatahani; Indonesia | 2:16.84 | Jinjutha Pholjamjumrus; Thailand | 2:18.01 |
| 400 m individual medley | Nguyễn Thị Ánh Viên; Vietnam | 4:47.85 | Jinjutha Pholjamjumrus; Thailand | 4:48.43 | Azzahra Permatahani; Indonesia | 4:49.55 |
| 4×100 m freestyle relay | Singapore (SGP); Quah Ting Wen (54.80); Quah Jing Wen (56.01); Cherlyn Yeoh (54.96); Amanda Lim (55.15) | 3:40.92; MR NR | Philippines (PHI); Remedy Rule (56.39); Nicole Justine Oliva (57.10); Xiandi Chua (57.84); Jasmine Alkhaldi (55.72) | 3:47.05; NR | Thailand (THA); Kornkarnjana Sapianchai; Manita Sathianchokwisan; Jenjira Srisa-Ard; Natthanan Junkrajang | 3:48.30 |
| 4×200 m freestyle relay | Singapore (SGP); Gan Ching Hwee (2:02.30); Quah Ting Wen (2:00.69); Quah Jing Wen (2:02.15); Christie Chue (2:01.86) | 8:07.00; MR NR | Thailand (THA); Kornkarnjana Sapianchai (2:03.30); Kamonchanok Kwanmuang (2:05.18); Fonpray Yamsuan (2:03.90); Natthanan Junkrajang (1:59.50) | 8:11.88; NR | Philippines (PHI); Nicole Justine Marie Oliva (2:03.44); Jasmine Alkhaldi (2:04.28); Xiandi Chua (2:04.74); Remedy Rule (2:03.00) | 8:15.46; NR |
| 4×100 m medley relay | Singapore (SGP); Elena Lee (1:04.69); Christie Chue (1:08.05); Quah Jing Wen (59.35); Quah Ting Wen (54.96) | 4:07.05; MR NR | Philippines (PHI); Chloe Isleta (1:03.37); Desirae Mangaoang (1:10.77); Remedy Rule (1:00.75); Jasmine Alkhaldi (56.21) | 4:11.10; NR | Thailand (THA); Saovanee Boonamphai; Nisha Kijkanakorn; Supasuta Sounthornchote; Kornkarnjana Sapianchai | 4:14.35 |

== Water polo ==
=== Men ===
| Event | Gold | Silver | Bronze |
|---|---|---|---|
| Men's tournament details | Indonesia | Philippines | Singapore |

=== Women ===
| Event | Gold | Silver | Bronze |
|---|---|---|---|
| Women's tournament details | Thailand | Singapore | Philippines |

== Medal table ==
* Host nation (Philippines)

| Rank | Nation | Gold | Silver | Bronze | Total |
|---|---|---|---|---|---|
| 1 | Singapore (SGP) | 23 | 12 | 7 | 42 |
| 2 | Vietnam (VIE) | 11 | 7 | 10 | 28 |
| 3 | Malaysia (MAS) | 6 | 4 | 3 | 13 |
| 4 | Thailand (THA) | 2 | 9 | 8 | 19 |
| 5 | Indonesia (INA) | 2 | 6 | 7 | 15 |
| 6 | Philippines (PHI)* | 1 | 7 | 10 | 18 |
| 7 | Brunei (BRU) | 0 | 0 | 0 | 0 |
| 7 | Cambodia (CAM) | 0 | 0 | 0 | 0 |
| 7 | Laos (LAO) | 0 | 0 | 0 | 0 |
| 7 | Myanmar (MYA) | 0 | 0 | 0 | 0 |
| 7 | Timor-Leste (TLS) | 0 | 0 | 0 | 0 |
| Totals (11 entries) | | 45 | 45 | 45 | 135 |
