= Singapore at the 2019 World Aquatics Championships =

- Flag of Singapore
- FINA code: SGP
- National federation: Singapore Swimming Association
- Website: www.swimming.org.sg

World Aquatics Championships appearances
- 1973; 1975; 1978; 1982; 1986; 1991; 1994; 1998; 2001; 2003; 2005; 2007; 2009; 2011; 2013; 2015; 2017; 2019; 2022; 2023; 2024

Singapore competed at the 2019 World Aquatics Championships in Gwangju, South Korea from 12 to 28 July.

== Artistic swimming ==
Singapore's artistic swimming team consisted of 11 athletes (11 female).

Women

Athlete	Event	Preliminaries		Final	
Athlete	Event	Points	Rank	Points	Rank
Debbie Soh; Miya Yong	Duet technical routine	76.0941	27	did not advance	
Debbie Soh; Miya Yong	Duet free routine	77.2333	23	did not advance	
Carolyn Buckle; Hannah Chiang; Ariel Sng; Debbie Soh; Posh Soh; Teo Mou Wen; Rachael Thean; Miya Yong; Petra Chiang(r); Royce Soh(r)	Team technical routine	75.0587	19	did not advance	
Carolyn Buckle; Hannah Chiang; Ariel Sng; Debbie Soh; Posh Soh; Teo Mou Wen; Rachael Thean; Miya Yong; Petra Chiang(r); Sandra Tay(r)	Team free routine	76.3333	20	did not advance	

== Diving ==
Singapore entered 7 divers (3 male and 4 female).

Men

Athlete	Event	Preliminaries		Semifinals		Final	
Athlete	Event	Points	Rank	Points	Rank	Points	Rank
Mark Lee Han Ming	3 m springboard	339.85	40	did not advance			
Jonathan Chan Fan Keng	10 m platform	322.85	32	did not advance			
Mark Lee Han Ming; Timothy Lee Jan Kuan	3 m synchronized springboard	314.91	19	—		did not advance	

Women

Athlete	Event	Preliminaries		Semifinals		Final	
Athlete	Event	Points	Rank	Points	Rank	Points	Rank
Ashlee Tan Yi Xuan	3 m springboard	221.45	39	did not advance			
Myra Lee	10 m platform	205.20	33	did not advance			
Freida Lim Shen-Yan	10 m platform	270.30	20	did not advance			
Fong Kay Yian; Ashlee Tan Yi Xuan	3 m synchronized springboard	206.49	21	—		did not advance	

== Swimming ==
Singapore entered twelve swimmers (7 men and 5 women).

Men

Athlete	Event	Heat		Semifinal		Final	
Athlete	Event	Time	Rank	Time	Rank	Time	Rank
Jonathan Tan	50 m freestyle	22.56	=34	did not advance			
Darren Chua	100 m freestyle	49.89	40	did not advance			
Darren Chua	200 m freestyle	1:49.56	=35	did not advance			
Glen Lim Jun Wei	400 m freestyle	3:55.60	34	—		did not advance	
Glen Lim Jun Wei	800 m freestyle	8:13.02	30	—		did not advance	
Quah Zheng Wen	50 m backstroke	25.50	=24	did not advance			
Quah Zheng Wen	200 m butterfly	1:59.10	27	did not advance			
Lionel Khoo	50 m breaststroke	28.46	44	did not advance			
Lionel Khoo	100 m breaststroke	1:02.66	49	did not advance			
Joseph Schooling	50 m butterfly	23.73	20	did not advance			
Joseph Schooling	100 m butterfly	52.93	24	did not advance			
Phang Sheng Jun	200 m individual medley	2:03.96	35	did not advance			
Phang Sheng Jun	400 m individual medley	4:28.93	31	—		did not advance	
Joseph Schooling; Quah Zheng Wen; Jonathan Tan; Darren Chua	4×100 m freestyle relay	3:16.66	18	—		did not advance	
Quah Zheng Wen; Darren Chua; Jonathan Tan; Glen Lim Jun Wei	4×200 m freestyle relay	7:18.12	21	—		did not advance	
Quah Zheng Wen; Lionel Khoo; Jonathan Tan; Darren Chua	4×100 m medley relay	3:41.58	26	—		did not advance	

Women

Athlete	Event	Heat		Semifinal		Final	
Athlete	Event	Time	Rank	Time	Rank	Time	Rank
Quah Ting Wen	50 m freestyle	25.50	28	did not advance			
Quah Ting Wen	100 m freestyle	55.60	32	did not advance			
Quah Ting Wen	200 m freestyle	2:00.39	23	did not advance			
Quah Ting Wen	50 m butterfly	26.92	27	did not advance			
Gan Ching Hwee	400 m freestyle	4:17.89	28	—		did not advance	
Gan Ching Hwee	800 m freestyle	8:47.88	23	—		did not advance	
Gan Ching Hwee	1500 m freestyle	16:44.65	21	—		did not advance	
Christie Chue	50 m breaststroke	32.39	36	did not advance			
Quah Jing Wen	100 m butterfly	1:01.49	37	did not advance			
Quah Jing Wen	200 m butterfly	2:12.48	21	did not advance			
Quah Ting Wen; Cherlyn Yeoh; Christie Chue; Quah Jing Wen	4×100 m freestyle relay	3:43.11	17	—		did not advance	
Quah Ting Wen; Gan Ching Hwee; Christie Chue; Quah Jing Wen	4×200 m freestyle relay	8:08.44	13	—		did not advance	
Quah Jing Wen; Christie Chue; Quah Ting Wen; Cherlyn Yeoh	4×100 m medley relay	4:11.67	21	—		did not advance	

Mixed

Athlete	Event	Heat		Final	
Athlete	Event	Time	Rank	Time	Rank
Darren Chua; Jonathan Tan; Cherlyn Yeoh; Quah Jing Wen	4×100 m freestyle relay	3:30.26	12	did not advance	
Quah Zheng Wen; Christie Chue; Jonathan Tan; Cherlyn Yeoh	4×100 m medley relay	3:53.90	20	did not advance	
