= Swimming at the 2017 SEA Games – Women's 200 metre butterfly =

Women's butterfly swimming competition in 2017

Swimming – Women's 200 metre butterfly at the 2017 SEA Games
- Venue: National Aquatic Centre
- Date: 21 August 2017
- Competitors: 10 from 6 nations
- Winning time: 2:12.03 NR

Medalists
gold medal	Quah Jing Wen	Singapore
silver medal	Lê Thị Mỹ Thảo	Vietnam
bronze medal	Patarawadee Kittiya	Thailand

The women's 200 metre butterfly competition of the swimming event at the 2017 SEA Games was held on 21 August at the National Aquatic Centre in Kuala Lumpur, Malaysia.

== Records ==
Prior to this competition, the existing Asian and Games records were as follows:

Asian Record	Liu Zige (CHN)	2:01.81	Jinan, China	21 October 2009
Games Record	Nguyễn Thị Ánh Viên (VIE)	2:11.12	Singapore, Singapore	9 June 2015

== Schedule ==
All times are Malaysia Standard Time (UTC+08:00)

Date	Time	Event
Monday, 21 August 2017	09:05	Heat 1
Monday, 21 August 2017	09:05	Heat 2
Monday, 21 August 2017	19:05	Final

== Results ==
=== Heats ===
The heats were held on 21 August.

==== Heat 1 ====
Source: Heat 1 results

Rank	Lane	Athletes	Time	Notes
1	4	Quah Jing Wen (SGP)	02:14.30	Q
2	2	Nguyễn Thị Ánh Viên (VIE)	02:15.10	Q
3	3	Nicholle Toh (SGP)	02:19.37	Q
4	5	Kanitta Nimdam (THA)	02:22.71	Q
5	6	Nan Honey Oo (MYA)	02:29.37	

==== Heat 2 ====
Source: Heat 2 results

Rank	Lane	Athletes	Time	Notes
1	2	Lê Thị Mỹ Thảo (VIE)	02:15.42	Q
3	4	Patarawadee Kittiya (THA)	02:15.79	Q
2	3	Azzahra Permatahan (INA)	02:16.35	Q
4	5	Adinda Larasati De (INA)	02:17.04	Q
5	6	Rosalee Mira Santa (PHI)	02:24.32	

=== Final ===
Source: Final Results

The final was held on 21 August.

Rank	Lane	Athletes	Time	Notes
1st place, gold medalist(s)	4	Quah Jing Wen (SGP)	02:12.03	
2nd place, silver medalist(s)	3	Lê Thị Mỹ Thảo (VIE)	02:14.52	
3rd place, bronze medalist(s)	6	Patarawadee Kittiya (THA)	02:15.05	
4	5	Nguyễn Thị Ánh Viên (VIE)	02:16.61	
5	7	Azzahra Permatahan (INA)	02:17.22	
6	2	Adinda Larasati De (INA)	02:17.49	
7	1	Nicholle Toh (SGP)	02:18.69	
8	8	Kanitta Nimdam (THA)	02:22.76	
