= Swimming at the 2015 SEA Games – Women's 200 metre freestyle =

Swimming – Women's 200 metre freestyle at the 2015 SEA Games
- Venue: OCBC Aquatic Centre
- Date: 9 June 2015
- Competitors: 10 from 5 nations

Medalists
gold medal	Nguyễn Thị Ánh Viên	Vietnam
silver medal	Natthanan Junkrajang	Thailand
bronze medal	Jasmine Alkhaldi	Philippines

The women's 200 metre freestyle competition of the swimming event at the 2015 SEA Games was held on 9 June at the OCBC Aquatic Centre in Kallang, Singapore.

== Records ==
Prior to this competition, the existing Asian and Games records were as follows:

Asian Record	Pang Jiaying (CHN)	1:55.05	Beijing, China	13 August 2008
Games Record	Quah Ting Wen (SIN)	2:00.57	Vientiane, Laos	13 December 2009

The following records were established during the competition:

Date	Event	Name	Nationality	Time	Record
9 June	Final	Nguyễn Thị Ánh Viên	Vietnam (VIE)	1:59.27	GR

== Schedule ==
All times are Singapore Standard Time (UTC+08:00)

Date	Time	Event
Tuesday, 9 June 2015	09:12	Heat 1
Tuesday, 9 June 2015	09:15	Heat 2
Tuesday, 9 June 2015	20:24	Final

== Results ==
KEY:	Q	Qualified	GR	Games record	NR	National record	PB	Personal best	SB	Seasonal best	WD	Withdrew	DNF	Did not finish

=== Heats ===
Source: Heats Results Summary

The heats were held on 9 June.

==== Heat 1 ====
Source: Heat 1 Results

Heat 1 was held on 9 June.

Rank	Lane	Athletes	Time	Notes
1	5	Jasmine Alkhaldi (PHI)	2:06.18	Q
2	4	Natthanan Junkrajang (THA)	2:06.33	Q
3	6	Ressa Kania Dewi (INA)	2:07.55	Q
4	2	Nguyễn Thị Diệu Linh (VIE)	2:08.88	Q

==== Heat 2 ====
Source: Heat 2 Results

Heat 2 was held on 9 June.

Rank	Lane	Athletes	Time	Notes
1	7	Rosalee Mira Santa Ana (PHI)	2:08.06	Q
2	5	Nguyễn Thị Ánh Viên (VIE)	2:08.52	Q
2	6	Christie May Chue Mun Ee (SIN)	2:08.60	Q
4	3	Benjaporn Sriphanomthorn (THA)	2:08.90	Q
5	4	Quah Ting Wen (SIN)	2:09.35	
6	2	Raina Saumi Graha Ramadhani (INA)	2:10.41	

=== Final ===
Source: Final Results

The final was held on 9 June.

Rank	Lane	Athletes	Time	Notes
1st place, gold medalist(s)	2	Nguyễn Thị Ánh Viên (VIE)	1:59.27	GR
2nd place, silver medalist(s)	5	Natthanan Junkrajang (THA)	2:00.54	NR
3rd place, bronze medalist(s)	4	Jasmine Alkhaldi (PHI)	2:00.84	
4	8	Benjaporn Sriphanomthorn (THA)	2:03.83	
5	7	Christie May Chue Mun Ee (SIN)	2:04.30	
6	1	Nguyễn Thị Diệu Linh (VIE)	2:06.93	
7	3	Ressa Kania Dewi (INA)	2:08.02	
8	6	Rosalee Mira Santa Ana (PHI)	2:10.87	
