= Swimming at the 2015 SEA Games – Women's 100 metre butterfly =

Swimming – Women's 100 metre butterfly at the 2015 SEA Games
- Venue: OCBC Aquatic Centre
- Date: 11 June 2015
- Competitors: 13 from 7 nations

Medalists
gold medal	Tao Li	Singapore
silver medal	Quah Ting Wen	Singapore
bronze medal	Jasmine Alkhaldi	Philippines

The women's 100 metre butterfly competition of the swimming event at the 2015 SEA Games was held on 11 June at the OCBC Aquatic Centre in Kallang, Singapore.

== Records ==
Prior to this competition, the existing Asian and Games records were as follows:

Asian record	Liu Zige (CHN)	56.07	Jinan, China	18 October 2009
Games record	Tao Li (SIN)	58.84	Palembang, Indonesia	12 November 2011

== Schedule ==
All times are Singapore Standard Time (UTC+08:00)

Date	Time	Event
Thursday, 11 June 2015	09:21	Heat 1
Thursday, 11 June 2015	09:22	Heat 2
Thursday, 11 June 2015	20:33	Final

== Results ==
KEY:	Q	Qualified	GR	Games record	NR	National record	PB	Personal best	SB	Seasonal best	WD	Withdrew	DNF	Did not finish

=== Heats ===
Source: Heats Results Summary

The heats were held on 11 June.

==== Heat 1 ====
Source: Results heat 1

Heat 1 was held on 11 June.

Rank	Lane	Athletes	Time	Notes
1	4	Quah Ting Wen (SIN)	1:02.84	Q
2	2	Monalisa Arieswaty Lorenza (INA)	1:03.34	Q
3	6	Patarawadee Kittiya (THA)	1:03.51	Q
4	5	Lê Thị Mỹ Thảo (VIE)	1:03.63	
5	3	Yap Siew Hui (MAS)	1:04.79	
6	7	San Su Moe Theint (MYA)	1:07.88	

==== Heat 2 ====
Source: Results heat 2

Heat 2 was held on 11 June.

Rank	Lane	Athletes	Time	Notes
1	2	Supasuta Sounthornchote (THA)	1:02.28	Q
2	3	Jasmine Alkhaldi (PHI)	1:02.76	Q
3	5	Nguyễn Thị Ánh Viên (VIE)	1:02.83	Q
4	4	Tao Li (SIN)	1:03.13	Q
5	6	Hannah Dato (PHI)	1:03.19	Q
6	7	Nurul Fajar Fitriyati (INA)	1:04.06	
7	1	Oo Shun Lei Maw (MYA)	1:11.70	

=== Final ===
Source: Final Results

The final was held on 11 June.

Rank	Lane	Athletes	Time	Notes
1st place, gold medalist(s)	2	Tao Li (SIN)	59.79	
2nd place, silver medalist(s)	6	Quah Ting Wen (SIN)	1:00.30	
3rd place, bronze medalist(s)	5	Jasmine Alkhaldi (PHI)	1:01.00	
4	4	Supasuta Sounthornchote (THA)	1:01.36	
5	8	Patarawadee Kittiya (THA)	1:01.45	
6	3	Nguyễn Thị Ánh Viên (VIE)	1:01.53	
7	7	Hannah Dato (PHI)	1:01.94	
8	1	Monalisa Arieswaty Lorenza (INA)	1:04.07	
