= Swimming at the 2025 SEA Games – Men's 100 metre backstroke =

Men's 100 metre backstroke at the 2025 SEA Games
- Venue: SAT Swimming Pool
- Date: 10 December
- Competitors: 11 from 6 nations
- Winning time: 55.08

Medalists
gold medal	Jason Yusuf	Indonesia
silver medal	Farrel Tangkas	Indonesia
bronze medal	Quah Zheng Wen	Singapore

The men's 100 metre backstroke event at the 2025 SEA Games took place on 10 December 2025 at the SAT Swimming Pool in Bangkok, Thailand.

== Schedule ==
All times are Indochina Standard Time (UTC+07:00)

Date	Time	Event
Wednesday, 10 December 2025	9:00	Heats
Wednesday, 10 December 2025	18:00	Final

== Records ==
Prior to this competition, the existing world, Asian, and Southeast Asian Games records were as follows.

World Record	Thomas Ceccon (ITA)	51.60	Budapest, Hungary	20 June 2022
Asian Record	Xu Jiayu (CHN)	51.86	Qingdao, China	12 April 2017
Games Record	Quah Zheng Wen (SGP)	52.23	Capas, Philippines	12 December 2019

== Results ==
=== Heats ===
Rank	Heat	Lane	Swimmer	Nationality	Time	Notes
1	2	4	Quah Zheng Wen	Singapore	56.35	Q
2	2	5	Jason Yusuf	Indonesia	56.48	Q
3	2	6	Logan Noguchi	Philippines	57.27	Q
4	2	3	Tonnam Kanteemool	Thailand	57.37	Q
5	1	3	Joran Orongo	Philippines	57.38	Q
6	1	6	Daniel Scott Williams	Malaysia	57.62	Q
7	1	4	Farrel Tangkas	Indonesia	57.71	Q
8	2	2	Cao Văn Dũng	Vietnam	57.78	Q
9	1	5	Zackery Tay	Singapore	58.02	R
10	1	2	Trinh Trương Vĩnh	Vietnam	58.40	R
11	2	7	Khomchan Wichachai	Thailand	59.66	

=== Final ===
Rank	Lane	Swimmer	Nationality	Time	Notes
1st place, gold medalist(s)	5	Jason Yusuf	Indonesia	55.08	
2nd place, silver medalist(s)	1	Farrel Tangkas	Indonesia	55.89	
3rd place, bronze medalist(s)	4	Quah Zheng Wen	Singapore	56.04	
4	3	Logan Noguchi	Philippines	56.55	
5	7	Daniel Scott Williams	Malaysia	57.11	
6	6	Tonnam Kanteemool	Thailand	57.16	
7	2	Joran Orongo	Philippines	57.33	
8	8	Cao Văn Dũng	Vietnam	57.47	
