= Swimming at the 2025 SEA Games – Men's 1500 metre freestyle =

Men's 1500 metre freestyle at the 2025 SEA Games
- Venue: SAT Swimming Pool
- Date: 12 December
- Competitors: 8 from 5 nations
- Winning time: 15:19.58

Medalists
gold medal	Nguyễn Huy Hoàng	Vietnam
silver medal	Mai Trần Tuấn Anh	Vietnam
bronze medal	Russel Pang	Singapore

The men's 1500 metre freestyle event at the 2025 SEA Games took place on 12 December 2025 at the SAT Swimming Pool in Bangkok, Thailand.

== Schedule ==
All times are Indochina Standard Time (UTC+07:00)

Date	Time	Event
Monday, 15 December 2025	18:32	Final

== Records ==
Prior to this competition, the existing world, Asian, and Southeast Asian Games records were as follows.

World Record	Bobby Finke (USA)	14:30.67	Paris, France	4 August 2024
Asian Record	Sun Yang (CHN)	14:31.02	London, United Kingdom	4 August 2012
Games Record	Nguyễn Huy Hoàng (VIE)	14:58.14	Capas, Philippines	5 December 2019

== Results ==
=== Finals ===
Rank	Lane	Swimmer	Nationality	Time	Notes
1st place, gold medalist(s)	4	Nguyễn Huy Hoàng	Vietnam	15:19.58	
2nd place, silver medalist(s)	5	Mai Trần Tuấn Anh	Vietnam	15:22.59	
3rd place, bronze medalist(s)	3	Russel Pang	Singapore	15:28.46	NR
4	3	Ratthawit Thammananthachote	Thailand	15:45.07	
5	7	Mochammad Akbar Putra Taufik	Indonesia	15:56.57	
6	1	Nicholas Karel Subagyo	Indonesia	15:59.60	
7	8	Khomchan Wichachai	Thailand	16:02.02	
8	6	Muhammad Dhuha Zulfikry	Malaysia	16:12.55	
