= Swimming at the 2025 SEA Games – Women's 200 metre butterfly =

Women's 200 metre butterfly at the 2025 SEA Games
- Venue: SAT Swimming Pool
- Date: 10 December
- Competitors: 10 from 6 nations
- Winning time: 2:11.78

Medalists
gold medal	Kamonchanok Kwanmuang	Thailand
silver medal	Võ Thị Mỹ Tiên	Vietnam
bronze medal	Quah Jing Wen	Singapore

The women's 200 metre butterfly event at the 2025 SEA Games took place on 10 December 2025 at the SAT Swimming Pool in Bangkok, Thailand.

== Schedule ==
All times are Indochina Standard Time (UTC+07:00)

Date	Time	Event
Wednesday, 10 December 2025	9:09	Heats
Wednesday, 10 December 2025	18:05	Final

== Records ==
Prior to this competition, the existing world, Asian, and Southeast Asian Games records were as follows.

World Record	Liu Zige (CHN)	2:01.81	Jinan, China	21 October 2009
Asian Record	Liu Zige (CHN)	2:01.81	Jinan, China	21 October 2009
Games Record	Quah Jing Wen (SGP)	2:09.52	Hanoi, Vietnam	14 May 2022

== Results ==
=== Heats ===
Rank	Heat	Lane	Swimmer	Nationality	Time	Notes
1	2	4	Kamonchanok Kwanmuang	Thailand	2:14.94	Q
2	1	4	Quah Jing Wen	Singapore	2:15.63	Q
3	1	5	Võ Thị Mỹ Tiên	Vietnam	2:16.24	Q
4	2	5	Michelle Surjadi Fang	Indonesia	2:18.05	Q
5	1	3	Micaela Jasmine Mojdeh	Philippines	2:19.25	Q
6	1	6	Kyla Louise Bulaga	Philippines	2:21.54	Q
7	1	2	Izzy Dwifaiva Hefrisyanthi	Indonesia	2:22.35	Q
8	2	3	Napatsawan Jaritkla	Thailand	2:22.60	Q
9	2	2	Shun Qi Lim	Malaysia	2:23.52	R
10	2	6	Shannon Yan Qing Tan	Malaysia	2:27.78	R

=== Final ===
Rank	Lane	Swimmer	Nationality	Time	Notes
1st place, gold medalist(s)	4	Kamonchanok Kwanmuang	Thailand	2:11.78	
2nd place, silver medalist(s)	3	Võ Thị Mỹ Tiên	Vietnam	2:12.10	
3rd place, bronze medalist(s)	5	Quah Jing Wen	Singapore	2:13.88	
4	6	Michelle Surjadi Fang	Indonesia	2:15.10	
5	2	Micaela Jasmine Mojdeh	Philippines	2:18.01	
6	1	Napatsawan Jaritkla	Thailand	2:21.80	
7	7	Kyla Louise Bulaga	Philippines	2:23.05	
–	–	Izzy Dwifaiva Hefrisyanthi	Indonesia	–	
