= Remedy Rule =

Filipino swimmer (born 1996)

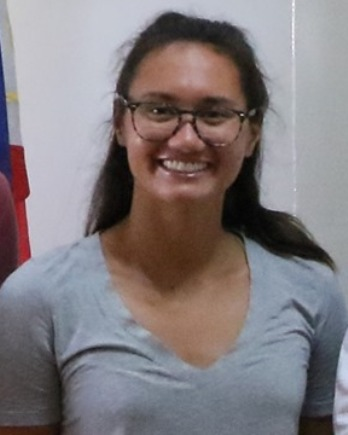
- Rule in 2019

Personal information
- Full name: Remedy Alexis Turla Rule
- National team: Philippines
- Born: Remedy Alexis Turla Rule; September 27, 1996 (age 29)
- Height: 5 ft 7 in (170 cm)

Sport
- Sport: Swimming
- College team: Texas Longhorns
Medal record
Women's swimming
Representing Philippines
| Event | 1st | 2nd | 3rd |
|---|---|---|---|
| Southeast Asian Games | 0 | 2 | 2 |
| Total | 0 | 2 | 2 |
Southeast Asian Games
| Silver medal – second place | 2019 Philippines | 200 m butterfly |
| Silver medal – second place | 2019 Philippines | 4×100 m freestyle relay |
| Silver medal – second place | 2019 Philippines | 4×100 m medley relay |
| Bronze medal – third place | 2019 Philippines | 200 m freestyle |
| Bronze medal – third place | 2019 Philippines | 4×200 m freestyle relay |

Remedy Alexis Turla Rule (born September 27, 1996) is a Filipino swimmer. She competed in the women's 50 metre freestyle at the 2019 World Aquatics Championships.

== Youth career ==
Rule started dedicating to swimming when she was 10 years old, aspiring to qualify for the Summer Olympics. Prior to that period, swimming was just one of the sports she played.

Rule swam for the Western Albemarle High School team and the Shenandoah Marlins Aquatic Club. She also had training with the Waynesboro YMCA.

== Collegiate career ==
In 2014, Rule committed to join the swimming team of the University of Texas which competes in the National Collegiate Athletic Association (NCAA) the following year. She did very well during her sophomore year by missing the top 16 by just 0.14 in the 100 fly but qualified for the A-final in the 200 fly event. She clocked 1:52.92 in the 200 fly event final which would have placed her third but was disqualified with officials insisting that her head broke the surface past 15 meters on her start. She was also named as part of two All-American teams.

== International career ==
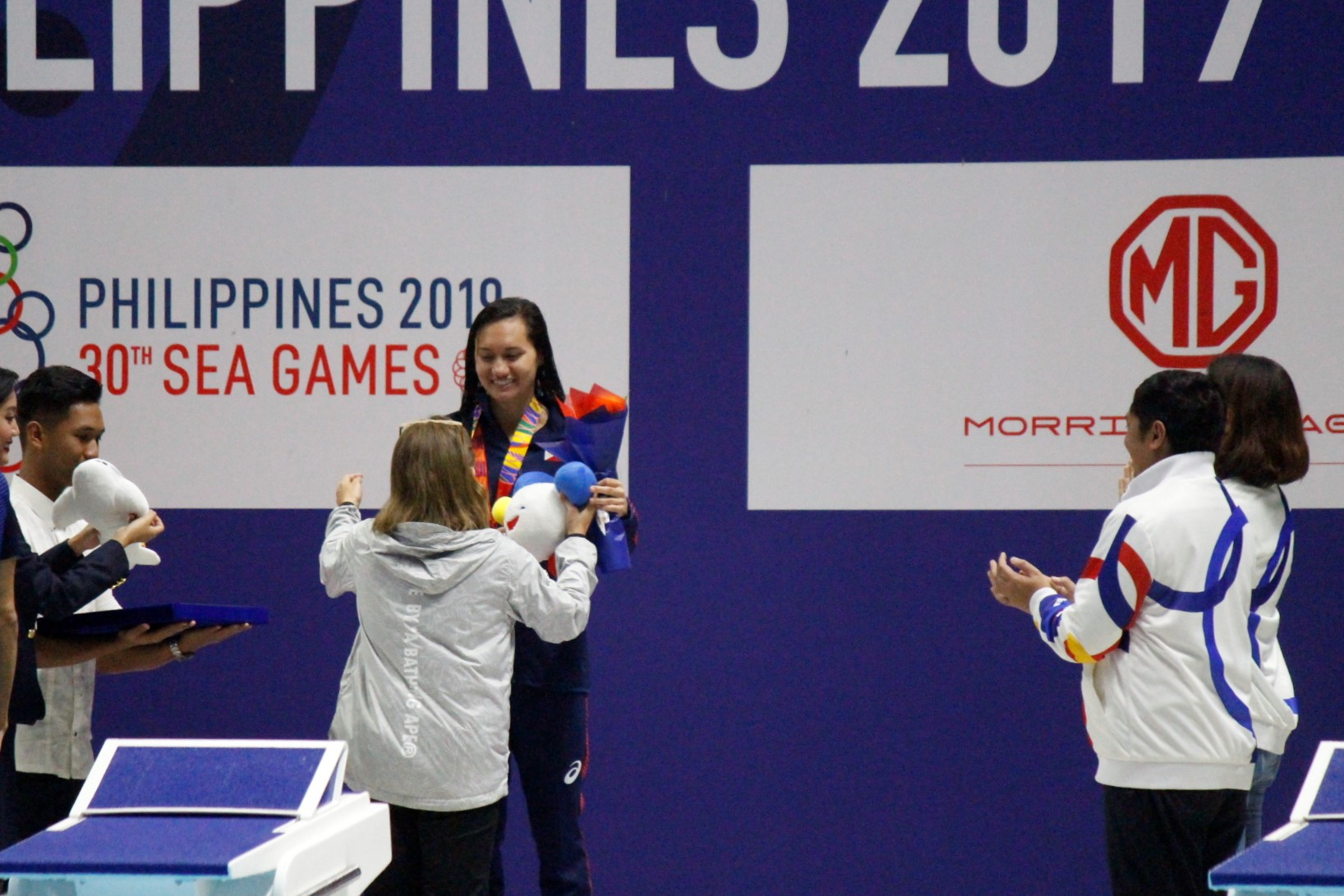
Remedy Rule receives her bronze medal after competing for the Philippines at the women's 200m freestyle at the 2019 Southeast Asian Games.

Rule participated in the 2012 United States Olympic trials. She qualified for three events for the trial; 200-meter backstroke, 100-meter butterfly, and 200-meter butterfly. She also made it to the United States' junior swimming team in 2014.

Rule started representing the Philippines in international competitions in 2019. She is qualified to compete for the Philippines through her mother who is a Filipino from Quezon City. Her first competition playing for the Philippines, was the 2019 World Aquatics Championships where she broke the Philippine national record set by Jasmine Alkhaldi (1:01.00) in the 2015 Southeast Asian Games in Singapore by clocking 1:00.42. She along with Luke Gebbie participated in the 2020 Tokyo Summer Olympics. Rule plans to retire after competing in the Olympics, to focus on her studies.
