= Lionel Khoo =

Singaporean swimmer (born 1995)

Personal information
- Full name: Khoo Chien Yin Lionel
- Nationality: Singapore
- Born: 27 March 1995 (age 31) Singapore
- Height: 1.80 m (5 ft 11 in)
- Weight: 77 kg (170 lb)

Sport
- Sport: Swimming
- Strokes: Breaststroke, medley
Medal record
Representing Singapore
Event	1st	2nd	3rd
Southeast Asian Games	4	1	2
ASEAN University Games	2	0	0
Total	6	1	2
Southeast Asian Games
Gold medal – first place	2015 Singapore	4x100 m medley
Gold medal – first place	2017 Kuala Lumpur	4×100 m medley
Gold medal – first place	2019 Philippines	50 m breaststroke
Gold medal – first place	2019 Philippines	4x100 m medley
Silver medal – second place	2015 Singapore	200 m breaststroke
Bronze medal – third place	2017 Kuala Lumpur	50 m breaststroke
Bronze medal – third place	2019 Philippines	100 m breaststroke

Lionel Khoo Chien Yin (born 27 March 1995) is a Singaporean swimmer. In 2015, Khoo won silver in the men's 200m breaststroke and gold in the 4 × 100 m medley relay at the SEA Games. In October 2016, he set a new national 200m breaststroke record at the Fina/airweave Swimming World Cup held at the OCBC Aquatic Centre, Singapore. Finishing fifth with a record of 2:11.80, he rewrote the previous record of 2:16.19 set at the 2016 ASEAN University Games in July.

== Personal life ==
Khoo's parents signed him up for swimming lessons after being pushed into the pool by a friend at the age of three. He started competitive swimming at the age of eight, and at 12, represented Singapore during the age groups.

A former student of Anglo-Chinese School (Independent), Khoo served national service in 2014 as a Special Constable Sergeant (SC/SGT) at the Tanglin Police Division.

A first-year student at the Singapore Management University's Lee Kong Chian School of Business, Khoo represented the university at the 2016 ASEAN University Games in July, where he set a new record of 2:16.19 for the 200m breaststroke.

== Career ==
While serving national service, Khoo started to train for the SEA Games 2015 where he won gold in the men's 4 × 100 m medley relay and silver in the men's 200m breaststroke. Together with Joseph Schooling, Quah Zheng Wen and Clement Lim, the team also broke the 4 × 100 m relay game and national record.

Khoo holds the record in the Short Course (25m) for the 50, 100 and 200 metres breaststroke and the 4 × 100 m relay with Joseph Schooling, Quah Zheng Wen and Rainer Ng. For Long Course (50m) events, he broke the two national records for the 100 and 200 metres breaststroke events in 2016. He also broke the national record for the Short Course mixed relay with Rainer Ng, Tao Li and Mylene Ong. As of December 2016, he holds 8 national records.

He competes in the 50, 100 and 200 metres breaststroke, and 4 × 100 m medley relay.

At the 2019 Southeast Asian Games, Lionel won a historic gold and broke the SEA Games record in the 50m breaststroke final with a time of 28.15. He became the first Singaporean male to clinch a breaststroke gold at the Games since Ng Yue Meng's victory in 1989. He also won Bronze in the 100m breaststroke event and another gold in the 4 × 100 m medley relay with Quah Zheng Wen, Joseph Schooling and Darren Chua.
