= Darren Chua =

Singaporean swimmer (born 2000)

Personal information
- Full name: Yi Shou Chua Darren
- Nationality: Singapore
- Born: 20 March 2000 (age 26) Singapore

Sport
- Sport: Swimming
- Strokes: Freestyle, medley
Medal record
Representing Singapore
Event	1st	2nd	3rd
Asian Games	0	0	1
Southeast Asian Games	5	1	0
Total	5	1	1
Asian Games
Bronze medal – third place	2018 Jakarta	4×100 m freestyle
Southeast Asian Games
Gold medal – first place	2019 Philippines	100 m freestyle
Gold medal – first place	2019 Philippines	200 m freestyle
Gold medal – first place	2019 Philippines	4x100 m freestyle
Gold medal – first place	2019 Philippines	4x200 m freestyle
Gold medal – first place	2019 Philippines	4x100 m medley
Silver medal – second place	2019 Philippines	200 m individual medley

Darren Chua Yi Shou (born 20 March 2000) is a Singaporean swimmer who competes internationally at the Southeast Asian Games and the Asian Games.

== Career ==
In 2017, Darren has participated in major swim meets such as the 6th FINA World Junior Swimming Championship, 6th Commonwealth Youth Games and the 2017 FINA Swimming World Cup.

Darren competed at the 2018 Asian Games. Along with Joseph Schooling, Quah Zheng Wen and Darren Lim combined to bag a bronze in the men's 4 × 100 m freestyle relay at the Games, setting a new national record.

Darren made his Southeast Asian Games debut in 2019 and bagged five golds - two in individual events and three in relays and a silver. Darren claimed his first individual title at the SEA Games, clinching the gold medal in the men's 200m freestyle on December 7 at the New Clark City Aquatics Center. He clocked a personal-best of 1min 48.26sec, just ahead of Malaysia's Welson Sim (1:48.52). Vietnam's Hoàng Quý Phước was third with his time of 1:48.59. It was Darren's third gold at the Games, after wins in the 4 × 100 m freestyle and 4 × 200 m freestyle relays.

Chua upset defending champion Welson Sim in the 200m freestyle, then stunned defending champion Joseph Schooling in the 100m freestyle.

Schooling's timing of 49.64 at the New Clark City Aquatic Complex meant that he was 0.05s behind Chua (49.59), who claimed gold.

== Personal life ==
Darren started as a mere water safety lesson, before taking up swimming as a career. Darren attended Temasek Polytechnic School of Applied Science in the Diploma in Veterinary Technology.
