= Swimming at the 2017 SEA Games =

- Venue: National Aquatic Centre
- Location: Kuala Lumpur, Malaysia
- Date: 18–26 August 2017

The swimming competitions at the 2017 SEA Games in Kuala Lumpur took place at National Aquatic Centre in Bukit Jalil. It was one of four aquatic sports at the games, along with diving, water polo, and synchronised swimming. Meanwhile, marathon swimming was held at the Putrajaya Lake.

The 2017 Games featured competitions in forty events (20 events for men and 20 events for women).

== Events ==
Similar to the program's format in 2015, swimming features a total of 40 events (20 each for men and women), including two 10 km open-water marathons. The following events will be contested (all pool events are long course, and distances are in metres unless stated):

- Freestyle: 50, 100, 200, 400, 800 (women), and 1,500 (men);
- Backstroke: 50,100 and 200;
- Breaststroke: 50,100 and 200;
- Butterfly: 50,100 and 200;
- Individual medley: 200 and 400;
- Relays: 4×100 free, 4×200 free; 4×100 medley
- Marathon: 10 kilometres

== Participation ==
=== Participating nations ===
- Cambodia (7)
- Indonesia (20)
- Laos (4)
- Malaysia (23)
- Myanmar (4)
- Philippines (8)
- Singapore (27)
- Thailand (23)
- Timor-Leste (1)
- Vietnam (17)

== Medal summary ==
=== Medal table ===
* Host nation (Malaysia)

Rank	Nation	Gold	Silver	Bronze	Total
1	Singapore	19	7	11	37
2	Vietnam	10	7	6	23
3	Malaysia*	5	3	3	11
4	Indonesia	4	11	10	25
5	Thailand	2	9	7	18
6	Philippines	0	3	4	7
Totals (6 entries)		40	40	41	121

=== Men's events ===
Event	Gold		Silver		Bronze	
50 m freestyle	Teong Tzen Wei; Singapore	22.55	Triady Fauzi Sidiq; Indonesia	22.66 NR	Paul Lê Nguyễn; Vietnam	22.90 NR
100 m freestyle	Joseph Schooling; Singapore	48.93	Hoàng Quý Phước; Vietnam	49.31	Darren Lim; Singapore	50.56
200 m freestyle	Welson Sim; Malaysia	1:47.79	Hoàng Quý Phước; Vietnam	1:48.07 NR	Danny Yeo; Singapore	1:48.49
400 m freestyle	Welson Sim; Malaysia	3:50.26 GR	Aflah Fadlan Prawira; Indonesia	3:54.15 NR	Nguyễn Hữu Kim Sơn; Vietnam	3:54.20 NR
1500 m freestyle	Nguyễn Huy Hoàng; Vietnam	15:20.10 GR, NR	Lâm Quang Nhật; Vietnam	15:23.94	Aflah Fadlan Prawira; Indonesia	15:28.69 NR
50 m backstroke	I Gede Siman Sudartawa; Indonesia	25.20 GR	Quah Zheng Wen; Singapore	25.39	Paul Lê Nguyễn; Vietnam	25.82
100 m backstroke	Quah Zheng Wen; Singapore	54.81	I Gede Siman Sudartawa; Indonesia	54.94 NR	Francis Fong; Singapore	55.92
200 m backstroke	Quah Zheng Wen; Singapore	2:00.09 GR	Francis Fong; Singapore	2:00.49	Ricky Anggawidjaja; Indonesia	2:02.76
50 m breaststroke	Indra Gunawan; Indonesia	28.07	James Deiparine; Philippines	28.60	Lionel Khoo; Singapore	28.63
100 m breaststroke	Gagarin Nathaniel; Indonesia	1:01.76 NR	James Deiparine; Philippines	1:02.11 NR	Radomyos Matjiur; Thailand	1:02.24
200 m breaststroke	Nuttapong Ketin; Thailand	2:14.35	Radomyos Matjiur; Thailand	2:14.96	Daniel Lim Jun Liang; Malaysia	2:15.77
50 m butterfly	Joseph Schooling; Singapore	23.06 GR	Triady Fauzi Sidiq; Indonesia	24.01 NR	Paul Lê Nguyễn; Vietnam	24.37
100 m butterfly	Joseph Schooling; Singapore	51.38 GR	Triady Fauzi Sidiq; Indonesia	53.03	Glenn Victor Sutanto; Indonesia	53.25
200 m butterfly	Quah Zheng Wen; Singapore	1:57.95	Tia'a Faang Der; Malaysia	2:01.04	Navaphat Wongcharoen; Thailand	2:01.06
200 m individual medley	Triady Fauzi Sidiq; Indonesia	2:01.72 NR	Pang Sheng Jun; Singapore	2:02.06	Paul Lê Nguyễn; Vietnam	2:03.39 NR
400 m individual medley	Nguyễn Hữu Kim Sơn; Vietnam	4:22.12 GR, NR	Aflah Fadlan Prawira; Indonesia	4:22.73 NR	Pang Sheng Jun; Singapore	4:23.54
4×100 m freestyle relay	Singapore; Joseph Schooling (49.25); Darren Lim (49.85); Danny Yeo (49.71); Quah Zheng Wen (49.04)	3:17.85 GR, NR	Malaysia; Keith Lim Kit Sern (51.10); Chan Jie (50.99); Ching Hwang Lim (50.34); Welson Sim (49.36)	3:21.79 NR	Indonesia; Triady Fauzi Sidiq (50.48); Raymond Sumitra Lukman (50.72); Ricky Anggawidjaja (51.33); I Gede Siman Sudartawa (51.12)	3:23.65 NR
4×200 m freestyle relay	Singapore; Danny Yeo (1:49.01); Quah Zheng Wen (1:48.90); Pang Sheng Jun (1:52.15); Joseph Schooling (1:48.88)	7:18.94	Vietnam; Hoàng Quý Phước (1:48.56); Nguyễn Huy Hoàng (1:50.80); Ngô Đình Chuyền (1:53.42); Trần Tấn Triệu (1:52.54)	7:25.32 NR	Malaysia; Welson Sim (1:47.36) GR, NR; Yeap Zheng Yang (1:52.05); Ching Hwang Lim (1:52.99); Keith Lim Kit Sern (1:54.51)	7:26.91
4×100 m medley relay	Singapore; Quah Zheng Wen (55.10); Lionel Khoo (1:01.75); Joseph Schooling (50.90); Darren Lim (49.71)	3:37.46 GR, NR	Indonesia; I Gede Siman Sudartawa (55.56); Gagarin Nathaniel (1:01.79); Glenn Victor Sutanto (52.87); Triady Fauzi Sidiq (50.12)	3:40.34 NR	Vietnam; Trần Duy Khôi (55.65); Phạm Thành Bảo (1:03.88); Hoàng Quý Phước (53.15); Ngô Đình Chuyền (50.41)	3:43.09 NR
10 km open water	Kevin Yeap; Malaysia	2:03:18	Peerapat Lertsathapornsuk; Thailand	2:05:41	Aflah Fadlan Prawira; Indonesia	2:08:40
AS Asian record | GR Games record | WR World record NR National record (Any world record is necessarily also a games, Asian, and national record. Asian records are also games and national records.)

=== Women's events ===
Event	Gold		Silver		Bronze	
50 m freestyle	Amanda Lim; Singapore	25.41 GR	Quah Ting Wen; Singapore	25.46	Jenjira Srisa-ard; Thailand	25.63 NR
100 m freestyle	Quah Ting Wen; Singapore	55.74 GR	Nguyễn Thị Ánh Viên; Vietnam	55.76 NR	Jasmine Alkhaldi; Philippines	55.90 NR
200 m freestyle	Nguyễn Thị Ánh Viên; Vietnam	1:59.24 GR	Natthanan Junkrajang; Thailand	2:01.34	Jasmine Alkhaldi; Philippines	2:02.02
400 m freestyle	Nguyễn Thị Ánh Viên; Vietnam	4:10.96	Ammiga Himathongkom; Thailand	4:15.54	Natthanan Junkrajang; Thailand	4:16.87
800 m freestyle	Nguyễn Thị Ánh Viên; Vietnam	8:35.55	Ammiga Himathongkom; Thailand	8:45.44	Natthanan Junkrajang; Thailand	8:51.09
50 m backstroke	Nguyễn Thị Ánh Viên; Vietnam	29.26 NR	Sofie Kemala Fatiha; Indonesia	29.81	Anak Agung Istri Kania Ratih; Indonesia	29.91
50 m backstroke	Nguyễn Thị Ánh Viên; Vietnam	29.26 NR	Sofie Kemala Fatiha; Indonesia	29.81	Caroline Chan; Malaysia	29.91
100 m backstroke	Nguyễn Thị Ánh Viên; Vietnam	1:01.89 GR, NR	Nurul Fajar Fitriyati; Indonesia	1:04.10 NR	Phiangkhwan Pawapotako; Thailand	1:04.59
200 m backstroke	Nguyễn Thị Ánh Viên; Vietnam	2:13.64 GR	Yessy Yosaputra; Indonesia	2:18.19	Roxanne Yu; Philippines	2:19.98
50 m breaststroke	Roanne Ho; Singapore	31.29 GR, NR	Phee Jinq En; Malaysia	31.54 NR	Samantha Yeo; Singapore	32.17
100 m breaststroke	Phee Jinq En; Malaysia	1:09.00 GR	Samantha Yeo; Singapore	1:09.44 NR	Anandia Evato; Indonesia	1:10.82
200 m breaststroke	Phiangkhwan Pawapotako; Thailand	2:29.58 GR, NR	Nguyễn Thị Ánh Viên; Vietnam	2:30.89 NR	Samantha Yeo; Singapore	2:32.41
50 m butterfly	Quah Ting Wen; Singapore	26.83	Jenjira Srisa-ard; Thailand	26.94 NR	Jasmine Alkhaldi; Philippines	27.27 NR
100 m butterfly	Quah Jing Wen; Singapore	59.38	Kornkarnjana Sapianchai; Thailand	1:00.45	Quah Ting Wen; Singapore	1:00.69
200 m butterfly	Quah Jing Wen; Singapore	2:12.03 NR	Lê Thị Mỹ Thảo; Vietnam	2:14.52	Patarawadee Kittiya; Thailand	2:15.05
200 m individual medley	Nguyễn Thị Ánh Viên; Vietnam	2:14.25	Samantha Yeo; Singapore	2:16.85 NR	Ressa Kania Dewi; Indonesia	2:17.46 NR
400 m individual medley	Nguyễn Thị Ánh Viên; Vietnam	4:45.82	Azzahra Permatahani; Indonesia	4:50.39 NR	Gan Ching Hwee; Singapore	4:54.51
4×100 m freestyle relay	Singapore; Quah Ting Wen (56.23); Amanda Lim (56.21); Natasha Ong (56.44); Quah Jing Wen (55.50)	3:44.38 GR, NR	Thailand; Kornkarnjana Sapianchai (56.75); Jenjira Srisa-ard (56.78); Patarawadee Kittiya (57.20); Natthanan Junkrajang (55.73)	3:46.46 NR	Indonesia; Ressa Kania Dewi (57.65); Sagita Putri Krisdewanti (57.17); Adinda Larasati Dewi (58.59); Patricia Yosita Hapsari (57.15)	3:50.56 NR
4×200 m freestyle relay	Singapore; Christie Chue (2:02.78); Quah Ting Wen (2:01.28); Rachel Tseng (2:03.61); Quah Jing Wen (2:02.74)	8:10.41 GR	Philippines; Nicole Oliva (2:04.21); Nicole Meah Pamintuan (2:07.28); Rosalee Mira Santa Ana (2:05.97); Jasmine Alkhaldi (2:01.12)	8:18.58 NR	None (Note: Benjaporn Sriphanomthorn of Thailand failed a "B sample" doping test and was stripped of her medals. She was stripped of her two silver medals which were won at the 10km open water swimming and 4x200m team relay event. The original bronze medalists were awarded silver. Sriphanomthorn clocked 2:16:37 in the open water swimming event while she and her teammates, Kornkarnjana Sapianchai, Patarawadee Kittiya, Natthanan Junkrajang registered a total time of 8:16.17 in the 4×200 m freestyle relay event.)	
4×100 m medley relay	Singapore; Hong En Qi (1:04.86); Samantha Yeo (1:10.06); Quah Jing Wen (58.69); Quah Ting Wen (55.71)	4:09.32	Thailand; Phiangkhwan Pawapotako (1:04.48); Chavunooch Salubluek (1:10.99); Patarawadee Kittiya (1:00.50); Natthanan Junkrajang (55.70)	4:11.67 NR	Indonesia; Nurul Fajar Fitriyati (1:04.13); Anandia Evato (1:10.17); Adinda Larasati Dewi (1:01.69); Patricia Yosita Hapsari (56.45)	4:12.44 NR
10 km open water	Heidi Gan; Malaysia	2:11:02	Chantal Liew; Singapore	2:21:30	None	
AS Asian record | GR Games record | WR World record NR National record (Any world record is necessarily also a games, Asian, and national record. Asian records are also games and national records.)

== See also ==
- Swimming at the 2017 ASEAN Para Games
