= Open water swimming at the 2019 SEA Games =

- Venue: Hanjin Boat Terminal, Cubi, Subic
- Date: 10 December

Medalists
gold medal	Trần Tấn Triệu	Vietnam
silver medal	Nguyễn Huy Hoàng	Vietnam
bronze medal	Tanakrit Kittiya	Thailand

The open water swimming at the 2019 Southeast Asian Games in the Philippines was held at the Hanjin Boat Terminal in Cubi, Subic on 10 December 2019. It was the first time such event was held in the SEA Games. Only one event was contested: the men's 10 km. It was one of four aquatic sports contested at the SEA Games, along with diving, swimming, and water polo.

== Medal summary ==
=== Medal table ===
* Host nation (Philippines)

Rank	Nation	Gold	Silver	Bronze	Total
1	Vietnam (VIE)	1	1	0	2
2	Thailand (THA)	0	0	1	1
3	Philippines (PHI)*	0	0	0	0
Totals (3 entries)		1	1	1	3

=== Medalists ===
Event	Gold	Silver	Bronze
Men's 10 km	Trần Tấn Triệu; Vietnam	Nguyễn Huy Hoàng; Vietnam	Tanakrit Kittiya; Thailand

== Results ==
The race was held on 10 December 2019.

Rank	Swimmer	Nationality	Time
1st place, gold medalist(s)	Trần Tấn Triệu	Vietnam	1:53:31
2nd place, silver medalist(s)	Nguyễn Huy Hoàng	Vietnam	1:55:37
3rd place, bronze medalist(s)	Tanakrit Kittiya	Thailand	2:00:15
4	Aflah Fadlan Prawira	Indonesia	2:03.55
5	Siwat Matangkapong	Thailand	2:05.22
6	Luke Tan	Singapore	2:05.33
7	Ritchie Oh	Singapore	2:06.24
8	Jose Joaquin Gonzalez	Philippines	2:13.10
9	Jairus Villamor	Philippines	2:15.20

- Source: 2019 SEA Games
