= Swimming at the 2019 SEA Games =

- Venue: New Clark City Aquatics Center
- Location: Capas, Tarlac, Philippines
- Date: 4–9 December
- Nations: 9

The swimming competitions at the 2019 SEA Games in Manila were held at the New Clark City Aquatics Center from 4 to 9 December 2019. It is one of four aquatic sports at the Games, along with diving, open water swimming, and water polo.

== Summary ==
Singapore improved on its last SEA Games result and won over half the available gold medals, 23 out of 38, to be the first in swimming events again with a total of 37 medals. Singapore won all the relay events and set 13 Games records and seven Singaporean national records. Vietnam finished in second with 10 gold medals and 25 medals in total.

A total of 20 Games records and 35 national records were broken.

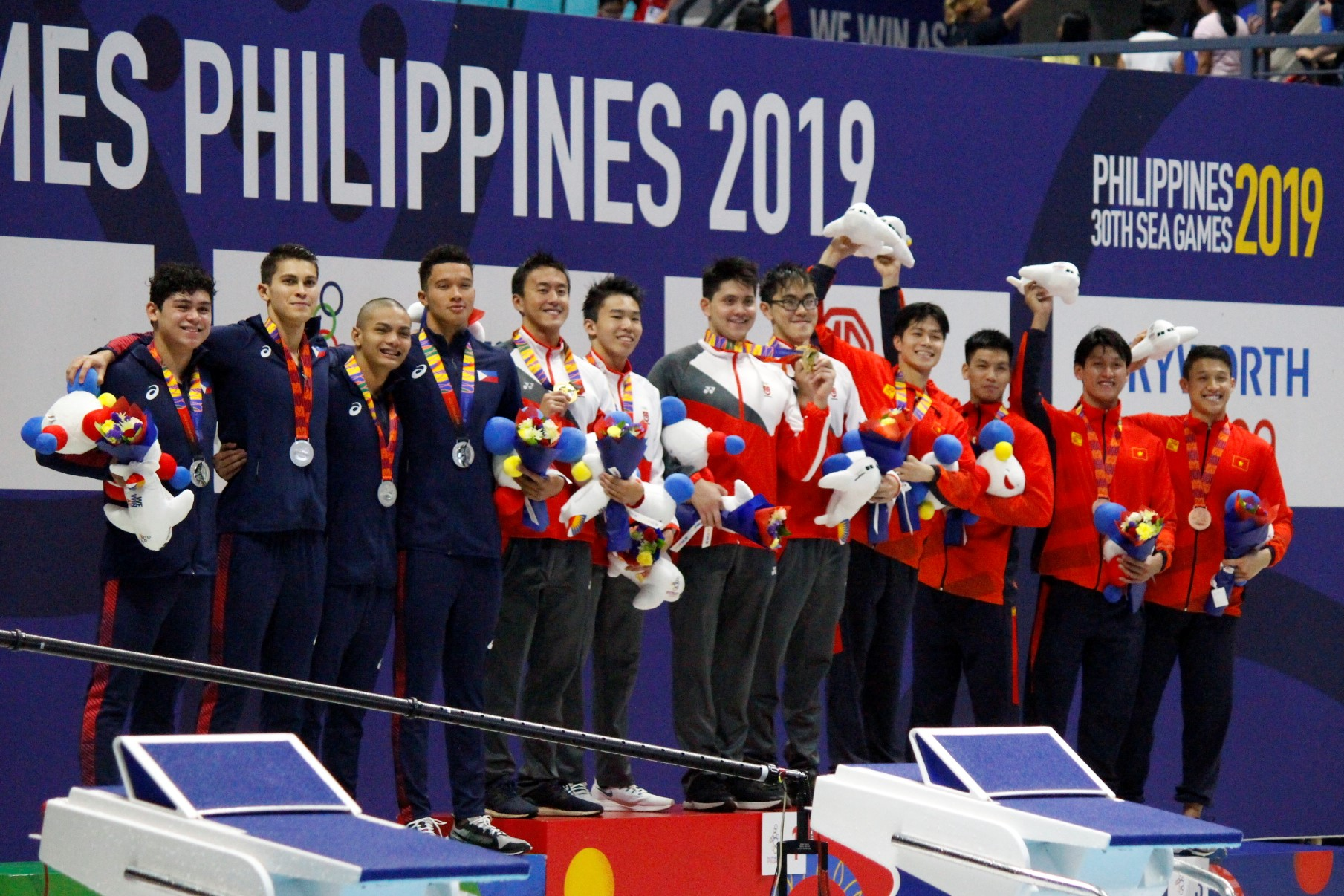
Medal ceremony for the men's 4×100 m freestyle relay.

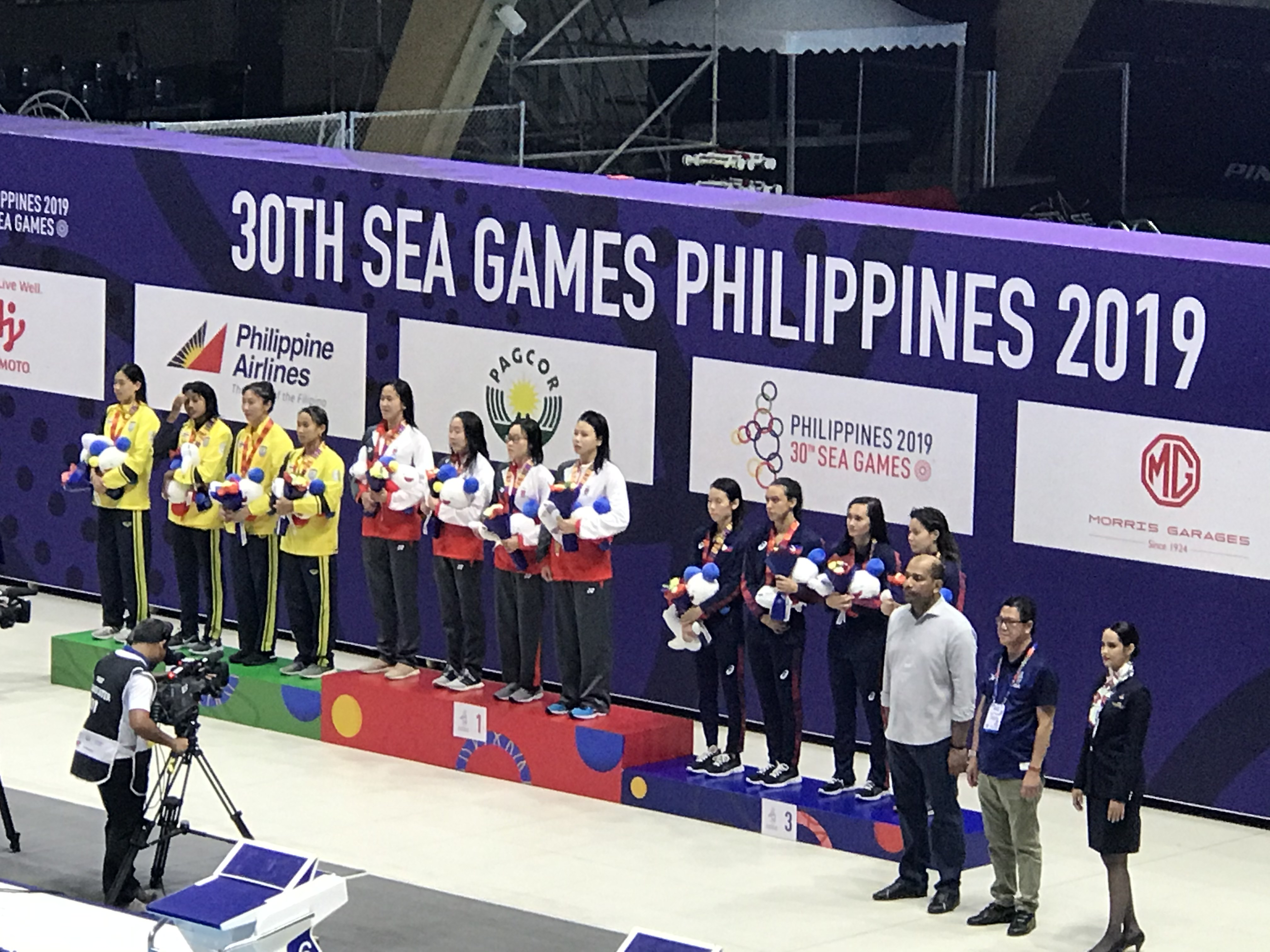
Medal ceremony for the women's 4×200 m freestyle relay.

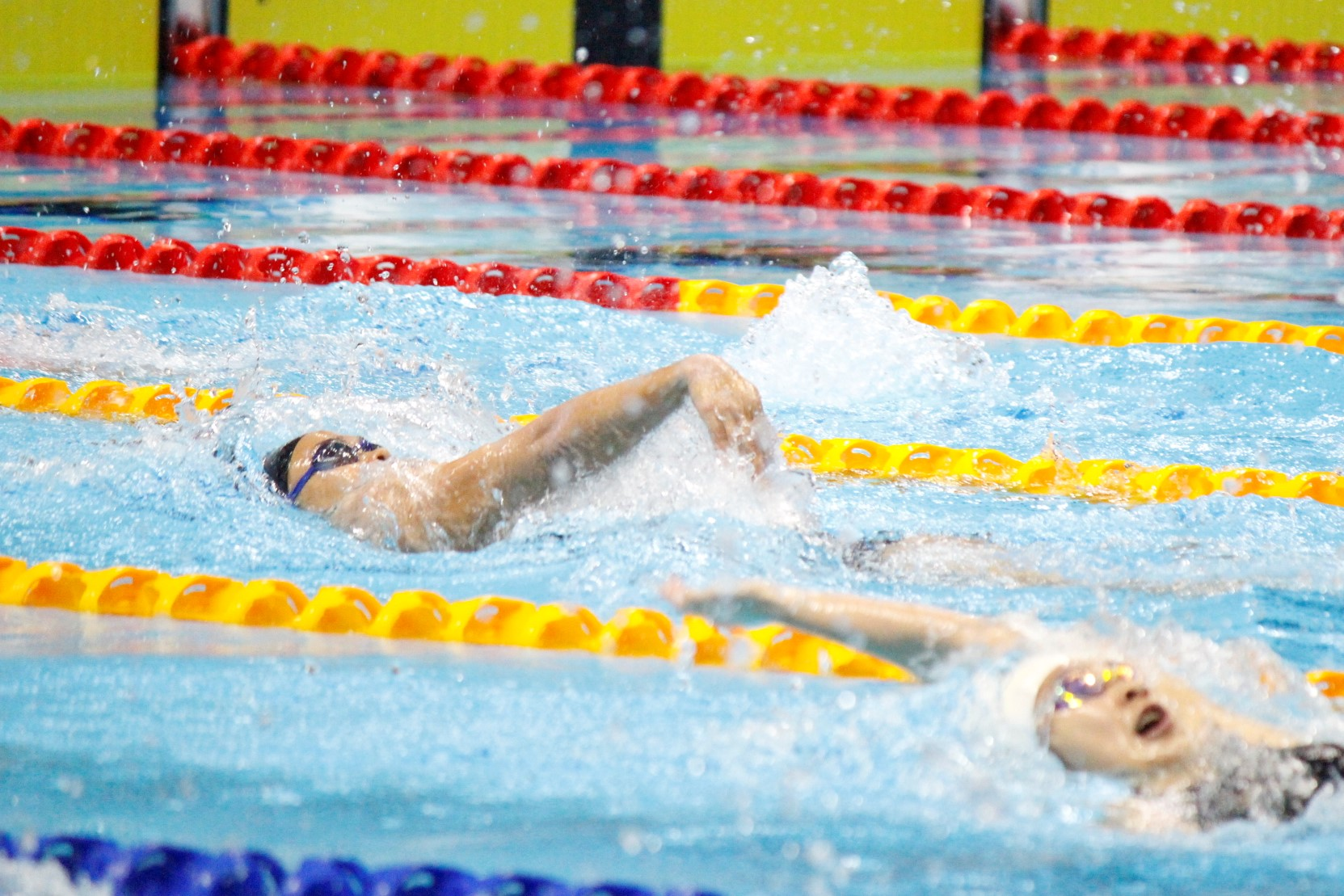
Filipino swimmer Chloe Isleta (left) competes in the women's 200m backstroke

== Participating nations ==
- Brunei
- Cambodia
- Indonesia
- Laos
- Malaysia
- Myanmar
- Philippines
- Singapore
- Thailand
- Timor-Leste
- Vietnam

== Medal table ==
* Host nation (Philippines)

Rank	Nation	Gold	Silver	Bronze	Total
1	Singapore	23	10	4	37
2	Vietnam	10	6	9	25
3	Malaysia	2	2	3	7
4	Thailand	1	8	6	15
5	Philippines*	1	6	9	16
6	Indonesia	1	6	7	14
Totals (6 entries)		38	38	38	114

== Medalists ==
Key
MR	SEA Games record	NR	National record

=== Men ===
Event	Gold		Silver		Bronze	
50 m freestyle	Jonathan Tan; Singapore	22.25 MR, NR	Teong Tzen Wei; Singapore	22.40	Luke Michael Gebbie; Philippines	22.62 =NR
100 m freestyle	Darren Chua; Singapore	49.59	Joseph Schooling; Singapore	49.64	Hoàng Quý Phước; Vietnam	50.08
200 m freestyle	Darren Chua; Singapore	1:48.26	Welson Sim; Malaysia	1:48.52	Hoàng Quý Phước; Vietnam	1:48.59
400 m freestyle	Nguyễn Huy Hoàng; Vietnam	3:49.08; MR	Welson Sim; Malaysia	3:49.55	Aflah Fadlan Prawira; Indonesia	3:52.65
1500 m freestyle	Nguyễn Huy Hoàng; Vietnam	14:58.14; MR, NR	Aflah Fadlan Prawira; Indonesia	15:15.77; NR	Nguyễn Hữu Kim Sơn; Vietnam	15:18.87
50 m backstroke	I Gede Siman Sudartawa; Indonesia	25.12; MR	Quah Zheng Wen; Singapore	25.65	Paul Lê Nguyễn; Vietnam	25.73
100 m backstroke	Quah Zheng Wen; Singapore	53.79; MR, NR	Paul Lê Nguyễn; Vietnam	54.98; NR	I Gede Siman Sudartawa; Indonesia	55.68
200 m backstroke	Quah Zheng Wen; Singapore	2:00.06; MR	Farrel Armandio Tangkas; Indonesia	2:02.75	Khiew Hoe Yean; Malaysia	2:03.89
50 m breaststroke	Lionel Khoo; Singapore	28.15 MR	James Deiparine; Philippines	28.32	Gagarin Nathaniel Yus; Indonesia	28.52
100 m breaststroke	James Deiparine; Philippines	1:01.46; MR, NR	Phạm Thanh Bảo; Vietnam	1:01.92	Lionel Khoo; Singapore	1:01.98
200 m breaststroke	Nuttapong Ketin; Thailand	2:12.57; MR NR	Phạm Thanh Bảo; Vietnam	2:12.84; NR	Maximillian Ang Wei; Singapore	2:13.96; NR
50 m butterfly	Teong Tzen Wei; Singapore	23.55	Joseph Schooling; Singapore	23.61	Glenn Victor Sutanto; Indonesia	23.84; NR
100 m butterfly	Joseph Schooling; Singapore	51.84	Quah Zheng Wen; Singapore	51.87	Paul Lê Nguyễn; Vietnam	53.89
200 m butterfly	Quah Zheng Wen; Singapore	1:56.61	Navaphat Wongcharoen; Thailand	2:00.31	Ong Jung Yi; Singapore	2:00.53
200 m individual medley	Trần Hưng Nguyên; Vietnam	2:02.56; NR	Darren Chua; Singapore	2:02.73	Triady Fauzi Sidiq; Indonesia	2:02.81
400 m individual medley	Trần Hưng Nguyên; Vietnam	4:20.65; MR NR	Aflah Fadlan Prawira; Indonesia	4:21.30; NR	Nguyễn Hữu Kim Sơn; Vietnam	4:26.45
4×100 m freestyle relay	Singapore; Darren Chua (50.05); Jonathan Tan (49.10); Quah Zheng Wen (48.40); Joseph Schooling (49.27)	3:16.82; MR	Philippines; Luke Michael Gebbie; Maurice Sacho Ilustre; Jean Pierre Sameh Khouzam; Jarod Jason Hatch	3:22.32; NR	Vietnam; Hoàng Quý Phước; Paul Lê Nguyễn; Ngô Đình Chuyền; Trần Hưng Nguyên	3:22.45; NR
4×200 m freestyle relay	Singapore; Quah Zheng Wen (1:48.50); Joseph Schooling (1:49.91); Jonathan Tan (1:51.15); Darren Chua (1:48.32)	7:17.88; MR	Vietnam; Hoàng Quý Phước (1:49.61); Nguyễn Hữu Kim Sơn (1:50.68); Ngô Đình Chuyền (1:50.77); Nguyễn Huy Hoàng (1:50.45)	7:21.51; NR	Malaysia; Khiew Hoe Yean (1:52.34); Welson Sim (1:48.93); Arvin Singh Chahal (1:51.46); Keith Lim (1:54.82)	7:27.55
4×100 m medley relay	Singapore; Quah Zheng Wen; Lionel Khoo; Joseph Schooling; Darren Chua	3:38.63	Indonesia; I Gede Siman Sudartawa; Triady Fauzi Sidiq; Gagarin Nathaniel Yus; Glenn Victor Sutanto	3:43.27	Vietnam; Ngô Đình Chuyền; Hoàng Quý Phước; Phạm Thanh Bảo; Trần Hưng Nguyên	3:44.36

=== Women ===
Event	Gold		Silver		Bronze	
50 m freestyle	Amanda Lim; Singapore	25.06; MR	Jenjira Srisaard; Thailand	25.32; NR	Jasmine Alkhaldi; Philippines	25.48; NR
100 m freestyle	Quah Ting Wen; Singapore	54.74; MR	Cherlyn Yeoh; Singapore	55.55	Jasmine Alkhaldi; Philippines	55.76; NR
200 m freestyle	Nguyễn Thị Ánh Viên; Vietnam	2:00.75	Natthanan Junkrajang; Thailand	2:00.93	Remedy Rule; Philippines	2:01.64
400 m freestyle	Nguyễn Thị Ánh Viên; Vietnam	4:13.20	Gan Ching Hwee; Singapore	4:14.56	Natthanan Junkrajang; Thailand	4:17.59
800 m freestyle	Gan Ching Hwee; Singapore	8:41.48	Nguyễn Thị Ánh Viên; Vietnam	8:48.65	Kamonchanok Kwanmuang; Thailand	8:50.23
50 m backstroke	Elena Lee; Singapore	29.40	Nguyễn Thị Ánh Viên; Vietnam	29.64	Anak Agung Istri Kania Ratih Atmaja; Indonesia	29.77
100 m backstroke	Nguyễn Thị Ánh Viên; Vietnam	1:02.97	Chloe Isleta; Philippines	1:03.87	Jasmine Alkhaldi; Philippines	1:04.08
200 m backstroke	Nguyễn Thị Ánh Viên; Vietnam	2:15.32	Nurul Fajar Fitriyati; Indonesia	2:17.84	Chloe Isleta; Philippines	2:18.48
50 m breaststroke	Phee Jinq En; Malaysia	31.40; NR	Jenjira Srisaard; Thailand	31.41; NR	Christie Chue; Singapore	31.43
100 m breaststroke	Phee Jinq En; Malaysia	1:08.50; MR NR	Christie Chue; Singapore	1:09.06; NR	Nisha Kukanakorn; Thailand	1:10.70
200 m breaststroke	Christie Chue; Singapore	2:28.71; MR NR	Phiangkhwan Pawapotako; Thailand	2:31.47	Phee Jinq En; Malaysia	2:32.38
50 m butterfly	Quah Ting Wen; Singapore	26.50	Jenjira Srisaard; Thailand	26.64; NR	Jasmine Alkhaldi; Philippines	27.09; NR
100 m butterfly	Quah Ting Wen; Singapore	59.62	Quah Jing Wen; Singapore	59.73	Jasmine Alkhaldi; Philippines	1:00.39; NR
200 m butterfly	Quah Jing Wen; Singapore	2:10.97; MR	Remedy Rule; Philippines	2:10.99; NR	Lê Thị Mỹ Thảo; Vietnam	2:12.70
200 m individual medley	Nguyễn Thị Ánh Viên; Vietnam	2:15.51	Azzahra Permatahani; Indonesia	2:16.84	Jinjutha Pholjamjumrus; Thailand	2:18.01
400 m individual medley	Nguyễn Thị Ánh Viên; Vietnam	4:47.85	Jinjutha Pholjamjumrus; Thailand	4:48.43	Azzahra Permatahani; Indonesia	4:49.55
4×100 m freestyle relay	Singapore; Quah Ting Wen (54.80); Quah Jing Wen (56.01); Cherlyn Yeoh (54.96); Amanda Lim (55.15)	3:40.92; MR NR	Philippines; Remedy Rule (56.39); Nicole Oliva (57.10); Xiandi Chua (57.84); Jasmine Alkhaldi (55.72)	3:47.05; NR	Thailand; Kornkarnjana Sapianchai; Manita Sathianchokwisan; Jenjira Srisaard; Natthanan Junkrajang	3:48.30
4×200 m freestyle relay	Singapore; Gan Ching Hwee (2:02.30); Quah Ting Wen (2:00.69); Quah Jing Wen (2:02.15); Christie Chue (2:01.86)	8:07.00; MR NR	Thailand; Kornkarnjana Sapianchai (2:03.30); Kamonchanok Kwanmuang (2:05.18); Fonpray Yamsuan (2:03.90); Natthanan Junkrajang (1:59.50)	8:11.88; NR	Philippines; Nicole Oliva (2:03.44); Jasmine Alkhaldi (2:04.28); Xiandi Chua (2:04.74); Remedy Rule (2:03.00)	8:15.46; NR
4×100 m medley relay	Singapore; Elena Lee (1:04.69); Christie Chue (1:08.05); Quah Jing Wen (59.35); Quah Ting Wen (54.96)	4:07.05; MR NR	Philippines; Chloe Isleta (1:03.37); Desirae Mangaoang (1:10.77); Remedy Rule (1:00.75); Jasmine Alkhaldi (56.21)	4:11.10; NR	Thailand; Saovanee Boonamphai; Nisha Kijkanakorn; Supasuta Sounthornchote; Kornkarnjana Sapianchai	4:14.35
