= Paul Lê Nguyễn =

Vietnamese swimmer (born 1992)

Personal information
- Nationality: Vietnamese
- Born: 27 November 1992 (age 33) Oklahoma, United States

Sport
- Sport: Swimming
Medal record
Men's swimming
Representing Vietnam
SEA Games
Gold medal – first place	2021 Hanoi	4×100 m freestyle
Silver medal – second place	2019 Manila	100 m backstroke
Silver medal – second place	2021 Hanoi	50 m backstroke
Silver medal – second place	2021 Hanoi	100 m backstroke
Silver medal – second place	2021 Hanoi	4×100 m medley
Bronze medal – third place	2017 Kuala Lumpur	50 m freestyle
Bronze medal – third place	2017 Kuala Lumpur	50 m backstroke
Bronze medal – third place	2017 Kuala Lumpur	50 m butterfly
Bronze medal – third place	2017 Kuala Lumpur	200 m medley
Bronze medal – third place	2019 Manila	50 m backstroke
Bronze medal – third place	2019 Manila	4×100 m freestyle

Paul Lê Nguyễn (born 27 November 1992) is a Vietnamese swimmer. He competed in the men's 100 metre backstroke event at the 2018 FINA World Swimming Championships (25 m), in Hangzhou, China. He was born in Oklahoma, United States.
