= Anak Agung Istri Kania Ratih Atmaja =

Indonesian swimmer (born 1998)

Personal information
- Nationality: Indonesia
- Born: 28 May 1998 (age 28) Kuta, Indonesia

Sport
- Sport: Swimming
- Club: Millenium Aquatic Swimming Club
Medal record
Women's swimming
Representing Indonesia
Southeast Asian Games
Bronze medal – third place	2017 Kuala Lumpur	50 m backstroke
Bronze medal – third place	2019 Manila	50 m backstroke
Bronze medal – third place	2021 Hanoi	50 m backstroke

Anak Agung Istri Ratih Kania Atmaja (born 28 May 1998) is an Indonesian swimmer and actress. She competed in numerous international events representing Indonesia and received bronze in the 2017 Southeast Asian Games. She also competed in domestic competitions representing Jakarta.

== Filmography ==
Year	Title	Role	Notes
2024	Grave Torture	Lala	
