= James Deiparine =

Filipino swimmer (born 1993)

Personal information
- Born: 4 January 1993 (age 33)

Sport
- Sport: Swimming
Medal record
Men's swimming
Representing Philippines
Event	1st	2nd	3rd
Southeast Asian Games	1	3	0
Total	1	3	0
Southeast Asian Games
Gold medal – first place	2019 Philippines	100 m breaststroke
Silver medal – second place	2019 Philippines	50 m breaststroke
Silver medal – second place	2017 Kuala Lumpur	50 m breaststroke
Silver medal – second place	2017 Kuala Lumpur	100 m breaststroke

James Deiparine (born 4 January 1993) is a Filipino swimmer. He competed in the men's 50 metre breaststroke event at the 2017 World Aquatics Championships.
