= Luke Gebbie =

Filipino Olympic swimmer

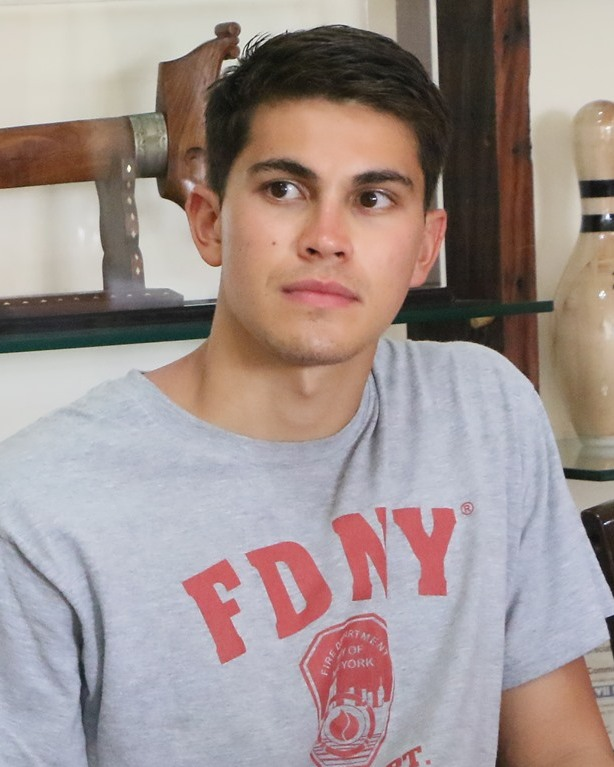
- Gebbie in 2019

Personal information
- National team: Philippines
- Born: Luke Michael Corpuz Gebbie; November 7, 1996 (age 29)
- Height: 187 cm (6 ft 2 in)

Sport
- Sport: Swimming
- College team: Melbourne Vicentre
Medal record
Men's swimming
Representing Philippines
Event	1st	2nd	3rd
Southeast Asian Games	0	1	1
Total	0	1	1
Southeast Asian Games
Bronze medal – third place	2019 Philippines	50 m freestyle
Silver medal – second place	2019 Philippines	4×100 m freestyle relay

Luke Michael Corpuz Gebbie (born November 7, 1996) is a Filipino Olympic swimmer. He holds a Southeast Asian Games bronze medal in 50 meter freestyle and a silver in 4x100 freestyle relay. He represented the Philippines at the Tokyo 2020 Summer Olympics.

== Early life and education ==
Luke Gebbie was born on November 7, 1996. His father is a New Zealander while his mother is a Filipino. He spent portion of his high school life in Bangkok before attending University of Melbourne.

== Career ==
Gebbie competed in the 2019 FINA World Championships in South Korea. In the tournament held in Gwangju, Gebbie established a new Philippine national record in the 100-meter freestyle by finishing with a time of 49.94 seconds. He is also the first Filipino to surpass the 50-seconds mark in the event.

He also participated in the 2019 Southeast Asian Games in the Philippines where he won a silver (men's 4x100 freestyle relay) and a bronze (men's 50 meter freestyle) for the host country. He also set new national records; In the men's 50 meter freestyle (22.57 seconds) and the men's 50m butterfly (24.34 seconds) events. The previous national men's 50m butterfly record was previously held by Daniel Coakley.

Based in Melbourne, Gebbie also participated in the 2021 Swimming Australia Olympic trials through a special exemption granted by Swimming Australia.

Gebbie qualified for the 2020 Summer Olympics in Tokyo after achieving Olympic QTB times in the 50 and 100m freestyle. He was subsequently awarded a universality placement.

He was due to compete at the 2021 Southeast Asian Games in Vietnam in May 2022 but was unable to after he tested positive for COVID-19.
