= Jasmine Alkhaldi =

Filipino swimmer (born 1993)

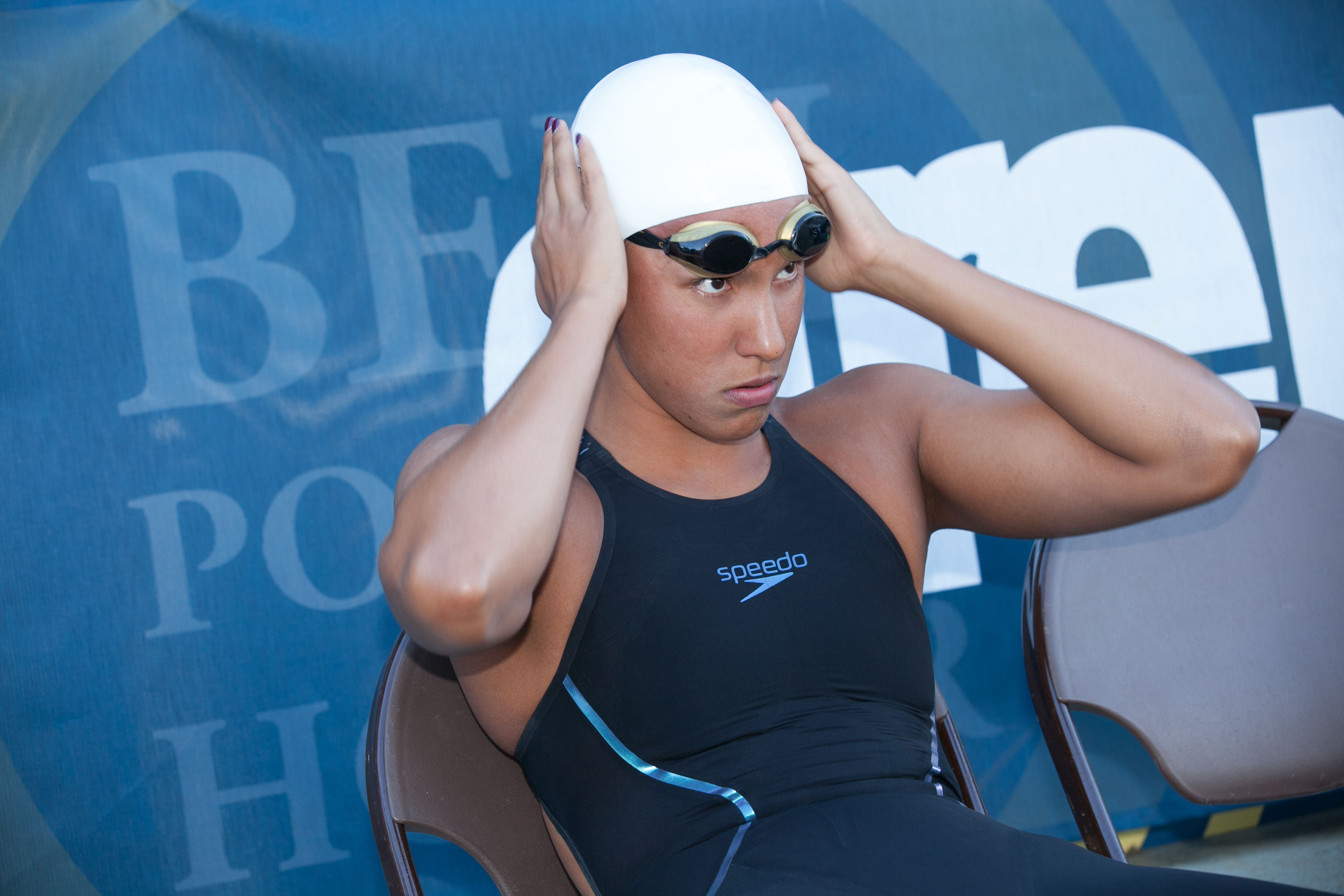
- Alkhaldi in 2016

Personal information
- Full name: Jasmine Alkhadi
- National team: Philippines; Suspended Member Federation (2023)
- Born: 20 June 1993 (age 33) Parañaque, Metro Manila, Philippines
- Height: 5 ft 8 in (173 cm)
- Weight: 64 kg (141 lb)

Sport
- Sport: Swimming
- Strokes: Butterfly, freestyle
- Club: Ayala Harpoons
- Coach: Archimedes Lim (2018)
Medal record
Women's swimming
Representing Philippines
Event	1st	2nd	3rd
Southeast Asian Games	0	7	21
Total	0	7	21
Southeast Asian Games
Silver medal – second place	2017 Kuala Lumpur	4 x 200 m freestyle relay
Silver medal – second place	2019 Philippines	4 x 100 m freestyle relay
Silver medal – second place	2019 Philippines	4 x 100 m medley relay
Silver medal – second place	2021 Vietnam	4 x 100 m medley relay
Silver medal – second place	2023 Cambodia	4 x 100 m freestyle relay
Silver medal – second place	2023 Cambodia	4 x 100 m medley relay
Silver medal – second place	2023 Cambodia	100 m freestyle
Bronze medal – third place	2013 Naypyidaw	100 m butterfly
Bronze medal – third place	2013 Naypyidaw	100 m freestyle
Bronze medal – third place	2015 Singapore	50 m butterfly
Bronze medal – third place	2015 Singapore	100 m butterfly
Bronze medal – third place	2015 Singapore	50 m freestyle
Bronze medal – third place	2015 Singapore	100 m freestyle
Bronze medal – third place	2015 Singapore	200 m freestyle
Bronze medal – third place	2015 Singapore	4 x 100 m medley relay
Bronze medal – third place	2017 Kuala Lumpur	50 m butterfly
Bronze medal – third place	2017 Kuala Lumpur	100 m freestyle
Bronze medal – third place	2017 Kuala Lumpur	200 m freestyle
Bronze medal – third place	2019 Philippines	4 x 200 m freestyle relay
Bronze medal – third place	2019 Philippines	50 m butterfly
Bronze medal – third place	2019 Philippines	100 m butterfly
Bronze medal – third place	2019 Philippines	100 m backstroke
Bronze medal – third place	2019 Philippines	50 m freestyle
Bronze medal – third place	2019 Philippines	100 m freestyle
Bronze medal – third place	2021 Vietnam	100 m butterfly
Bronze medal – third place	2023 Cambodia	4 x 200 m freestyle relay
Bronze medal – third place	2023 Cambodia	50 m butterfly
Bronze medal – third place	2023 Cambodia	100 m butterfly

Jasmine Alkhaldi (born 20 June 1993) is a Filipino swimmer who represented the Philippines in the 2012 and 2016 Summer Olympics. She holds the Philippine women's record in the 200, 100, and 50 metre freestyle and the 50 and 100 metre butterfly events. At the club level, Alkhaldi swims for the Ayala Harpoons.

== Early life and education ==
Alkhaldi was born in Parañaque to a Filipino mother from Cebu and a Saudi Arabian father. She has a brother and a sister. Alkhaldi attended the University of Hawaiʻi in the United States, where she graduated in 2016 with a business degree majoring in management and marketing.

== Swimming career ==
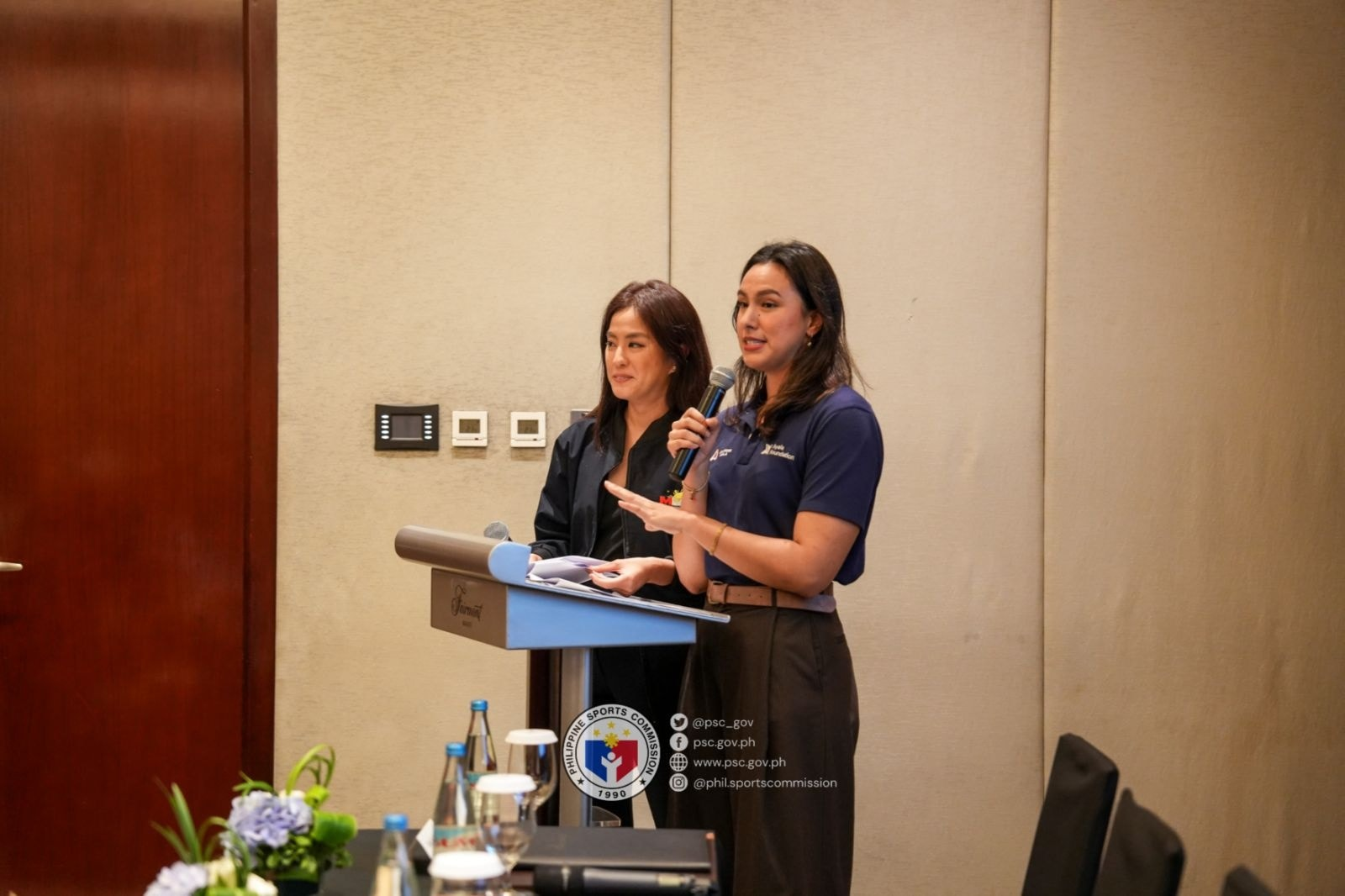
Alkhaldi (right) with Gretchen Ho in 2025

Prior to her participation in the 2012 Summer Olympics in London, Alkhaldi held the Philippines women's record in the 100 metre butterfly and 50 metre butterfly. Her personal best swimming times included the following. In the 2012 Summer Olympics, Alkhaldi swam the 100 metre freestyle in 57.13 seconds, placing 34th out of 50 competitors. She also participated in the 2016 Summer Olympics in Rio de Janeiro.

Alkhaldi has also participated in the Asian Games, particularly in the 2010, 2014, and 2018 editions.

In the 2013 Southeast Asian Games in Myanmar, Alkhaldi swam the 100 metre freestyle in a time of 56.65, winning the gold medal, however, the technical committee annulled the results because of a false start after a protest by the Thai swimmer who dived in too early. In the re-swim, Alkhaldi placed third and received only bronze with a time of 56.63. She also won the 100 metre butterfly receiving the bronze medal.

On the next edition of the regional games held in Singapore in 2015, she swam the 50 metre butterfly in 27.47, 100 metre freestyle in 56.10 and 200 metre freestyle in 2.00.84 where she beat the Philippine National Record also getting three bronze medals in these event. She ranked 4th in 4 × 100 metre freestyle with a time of 3.53.57 with Hannah Dato, Elizabeth Jordana and Roxanne Ashley Yu beating the previous Philippine national record of 3.56.20, clocked last in the 2009 SEA Games in Laos.

In October 2018, she was reportedly aiming to qualify for the 2020 Summer Olympics and preparing for the 2019 Southeast Asian Games. In 2018, she has secured support from private sponsors; from Cecilio Pedro of Hapee in early 2018 and Ever Bilena in 15 October. Alkhaldi as of this time is being trained by Archie Lim of the Ayala Harpoons club and former national coach.

Alkhaldi became the sole Filipino to qualify for the 2018 FINA World Swimming Championships in Hangzhou, China. She qualified by recording a time of 55.54 in the 100-m freestyle finals in the Singapore leg of the 2018 FINA Swimming World Cup in November surpassing the qualifying time of 55.66.

== Popularity ==
During the 2012 Summer Olympics, Alkhaldi became popular in online Saudi Arabian social networks, because she was a woman of Saudi Arabian origin who competed in the Olympic Games. Sarah Attar and Wojdan Shaherkani were the first women to compete in Olympic competition for Saudi Arabia.

== See also ==
- 2012 Summer Olympics
- List of Filipino athletes
