= Nguyễn Huy Hoàng (swimmer) =

Vietnamese swimmer (born 2000)

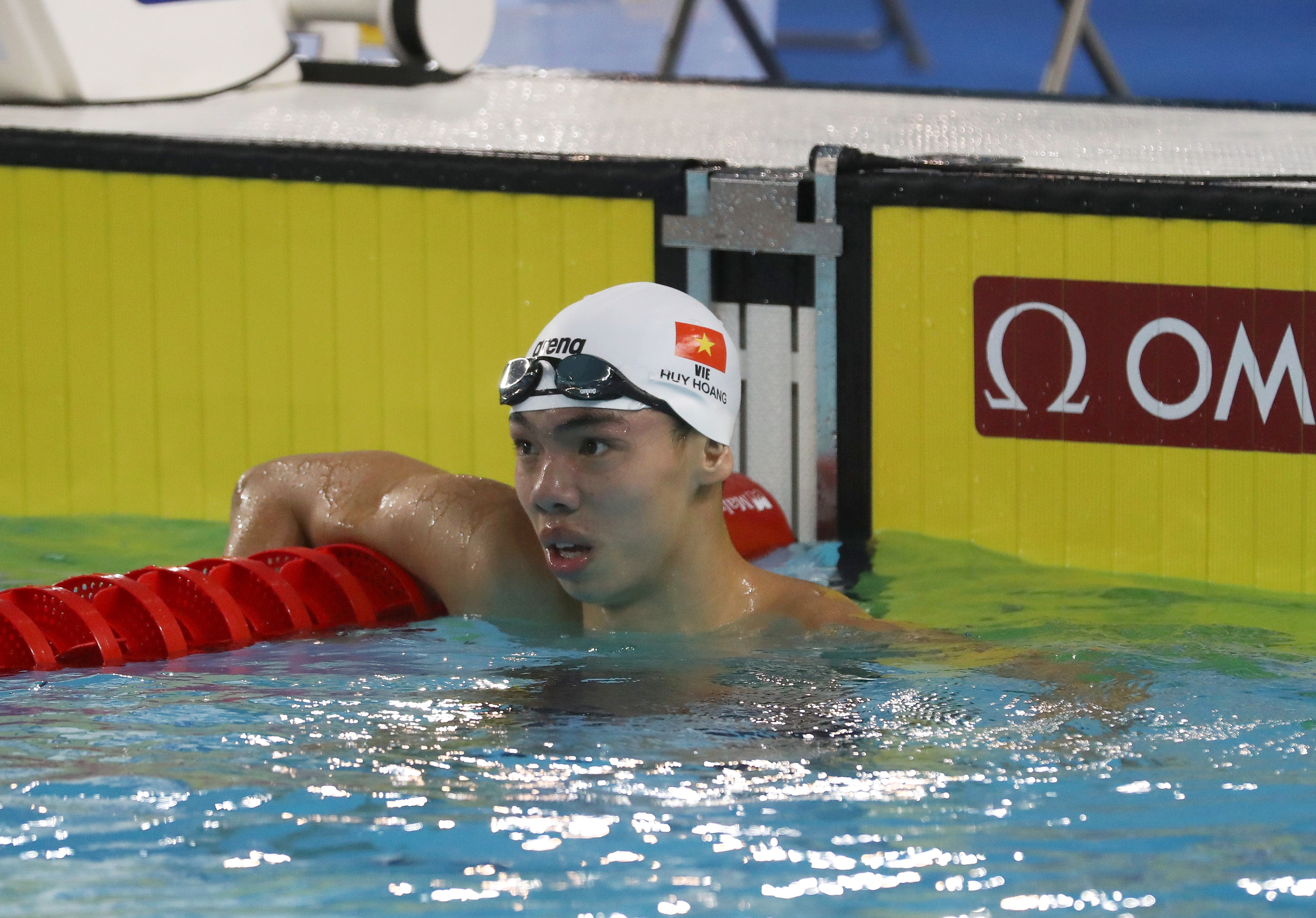
- Nguyễn Huy Hoàng in 2018

Personal information
- Nationality: Vietnamese
- Born: 10 July 2000 (age 26) Quảng Bình Province, Vietnam

Sport
- Sport: Swimming
- Strokes: Freestyle
Medal record
Men's swimming
Representing Vietnam
Event	1st	2nd	3rd
Asian Games	0	1	3
Asian Beach Games	0	2	0
Asian Championships	2	1	0
Southeast Asian Games	14	2	0
Youth Olympic Games	1	0	0
Total	17	6	3
Asian Games
Silver medal – second place	2018 Jakarta	1500 m freestyle
Bronze medal – third place	2018 Jakarta	800 m freestyle
Bronze medal – third place	2022 Hangzhou	800 m freestyle
Bronze medal – third place	2022 Hangzhou	400 m freestyle
Asian Beach Games
Silver medal – second place	2026 Sanya	5 km open water
Silver medal – second place	2026 Sanya	Team relay
Asian Championships
Gold medal – first place	2025 Ahmedabad	800 m freestyle
Gold medal – first place	2025 Ahmedabad	1500 m freestyle
Silver medal – second place	2025 Ahmedabad	400 m freestyle
Asian Open Water Championships
Silver medal – second place	2026 Bali	5 km open water
Bronze medal – third place	2026 Bali	10 km open water
Bronze medal – third place	2026 Bali	Mixed relay
Southeast Asian Games
Gold medal – first place	2017 Kuala Lumpur	1500 m freestyle
Gold medal – first place	2019 Philippines	400 m freestyle
Gold medal – first place	2019 Philippines	1500 m freestyle
Gold medal – first place	2021 Hanoi	400 m freestyle
Gold medal – first place	2021 Hanoi	1500 m freestyle
Gold medal – first place	2021 Hanoi	800 m freestyle
Gold medal – first place	2021 Hanoi	4×200 m freestyle
Gold medal – first place	2021 Hanoi	200 m butterfly
Gold medal – first place	2023 Phnom Penh	400 m freestyle
Gold medal – first place	2023 Phnom Penh	1500 m freestyle
Gold medal – first place	2023 Phnom Penh	4×200 m freestyle
Gold medal – first place	2025 Thailand	4×200 m freestyle
Gold medal – first place	2025 Thailand	1500 m freestyle
Gold medal – first place	2025 Thailand	mixed relay open water
Silver medal – second place	2019 Philippines	10 km open water
Silver medal – second place	2017 Kuala Lumpur	4×200 m freestyle
Silver medal – second place	2019 Philippines	4×200 m freestyle
Bronze medal – third place	2025 Thailand	400 m freestyle
Youth Olympic Games
Gold medal – first place	2018 Buenos Aires	800 m freestyle

Nguyễn Huy Hoàng (born 10 July 2000) is a Vietnamese swimmer. He competed at the 2018 Asian Games, winning silver in the men's 1500 metre freestyle and bronze in the men's 800 metre freestyle. He competed in the Men's 800 metre freestyle and Men's 1500 metre freestyle at the 2020 Summer Olympics. He competed at the 2026 Asian Beach Games, winning silver in the 5 kilometre open water and team rely. He was the first male Vietnamese swimmer to claim gold at the Youth Olympics.

== Personal best ==
Event	Time	Meet	Date
400 m freestyle	3:48.06, NR	Southeast Asian Games	16 May 2022
800 m freestyle	7:50:20, NR	Youth Olympic Games	11 October 2018
1500 m freestyle	14:58:14, NR	Southeast Asian Games	5 December 2019
5 km open water	17:32.3, NR	Asian Beach Games	26 April 2026
