= List of SEA Games records in swimming =

The fastest times in the swimming events at the Southeast Asian Games are designated as the Southeast Asian Games records in swimming. The events are held in a long course (50 m) pool. All records were set in finals unless noted otherwise.

Singapore has historically proven to be a powerhouse in swimming, especially in Southeast Asia. As a result, most records are held by Singaporeans.

== History ==
The 2009 Games were held in Vientiane, Laos where the records for 25 events were broken. Of these, 12 records were broken by Singapore, eight by Malaysia, two by the Philippines, and one each by Indonesia, Thailand and Vietnam. However, most of these records were broken while non-textile swimsuits were legal for use between February 2008 and December 2009. They have since been banned in January 2010. To date, 5 records set using the non-textile swimsuits remain in the record books.

== Men ==
Event	Time		Name	Nationality	Date	Meet	Location	Ref
50 m freestyle	21.91	h	Jonathan Tan	Singapore	7 May 2023	2023 Southeast Asian Games	Phnom Penh, Cambodia	
100 m freestyle	48.58		Joseph Schooling	Singapore	7 June 2015	2015 Southeast Asian Games	Singapore, Singapore	
200 m freestyle	1:47.36	r	Welson Sim	Malaysia	24 August 2017	2017 Southeast Asian Games	Kuala Lumpur, Malaysia	
400 m freestyle	3:48.06		Nguyễn Huy Hoàng	Vietnam	16 May 2022	2021 Southeast Asian Games	Hanoi, Vietnam	
800 m freestyle	7:57.65		Nguyễn Huy Hoàng	Vietnam	14 May 2022	2021 Southeast Asian Games	Hanoi, Vietnam	
1500 m freestyle	14:58.14		Nguyễn Huy Hoàng	Vietnam	5 December 2019	2019 Southeast Asian Games	New Clark City, Philippines	
50m backstroke	25.12		I Gede Siman Sudartawa	Indonesia	7 December 2019	2019 Southeast Asian Games	New Clark City, Philippines	
100m backstroke	53.79		Quah Zheng Wen	Singapore	4 December 2019	2019 Southeast Asian Games	New Clark City, Philippines	
200m backstroke	2:00.06		Quah Zheng Wen	Singapore	6 December 2019	2019 Southeast Asian Games	New Clark City, Philippines	
50m breaststroke	27.56	h	Felix Viktor Iberle	Indonesia	11 May 2023	2023 Southeast Asian Games	Phnom Penh, Cambodia	
100m breaststroke	1:00.97		Phạm Thanh Bảo	Vietnam	7 May 2023	2023 Southeast Asian Games	Phnom Penh, Cambodia	
200m breaststroke	2:11.45		Phạm Thanh Bảo	Vietnam	10 May 2023	2023 Southeast Asian Games	Phnom Penh, Cambodia	
50m butterfly	23.04		Teong Tzen Wei	Singapore	15 May 2022	2021 Southeast Asian Games	Hanoi, Vietnam	
100m butterfly	51.38		Joseph Schooling	Singapore	23 August 2017	2017 Southeast Asian Games	Kuala Lumpur, Malaysia	
200m butterfly	1:55.73		Joseph Schooling	Singapore	8 June 2015	2015 Southeast Asian Games	Singapore, Singapore	
200m individual medley	2:00.66		Joseph Schooling	Singapore	10 June 2015	2015 Southeast Asian Games	Singapore, Singapore	
400m individual medley	4:18.10		Trần Hưng Nguyên	Vietnam	15 May 2022	2021 Southeast Asian Games	Hanoi, Vietnam	
4×100m freestyle relay	3:16.65		Jonathan Tan (49.67); Mikkel Lee (48.25); Ardi Azman (50.03); Quah Zheng Wen (48.70)	Singapore	14 December 2025	2025 Southeast Asian Games	Bangkok, Thailand	
4×200m freestyle relay	7:16.31		Nguyễn Hữu Kim Sơn (1:50.19); Hoàng Quý Phước (1:48.42); Nguyễn Huy Hoàng (1:48.66); Trần Hưng Nguyễn (1:49.04)	Vietnam	17 May 2022	2021 Southeast Asian Games	Hanoi, Vietnam	
4×100m medley relay	3:37.45		Quah Zheng Wen (55.31); Nicholas Mahabir (1:00.68); Teong Tzen Wei (52.79); Jonathan Tan (48.67)	Singapore	8 May 2023	2023 Southeast Asian Games	Phnom Penh, Cambodia	

Legend: WR – World record; AS – Asian record;
Records not set in finals: h – heat; sf – semifinal; r – relay 1st leg; rh – relay heat 1st leg; so – swim-off

== Women ==
Event	Time		Name	Nationality	Date	Meet	Location	Ref
50m freestyle	25.03		Amanda Lim	Singapore	14 December 2025	2025 Southeast Asian Games	Bangkok, Thailand	
100m freestyle	54.74		Quah Ting Wen	Singapore	4 December 2019	2019 Southeast Asian Games	New Clark City, Philippines	
200m freestyle	1:59.10	r	Gan Ching Hwee	Singapore	14 December 2025	2025 Southeast Asian Games	Bangkok, Thailand	
400m freestyle	4:08.66		Nguyễn Thị Ánh Viên	Vietnam	10 June 2015	2015 Southeast Asian Games	Singapore, Singapore	
800m freestyle	8:33.13		Gan Ching Hwee	Singapore	15 December 2025	2025 Southeast Asian Games	Bangkok, Thailand	
1500m freestyle	16:36.73		Gan Ching Hwee	Singapore	18 May 2022	2021 Southeast Asian Games	Hanoi, Vietnam	
50m backstroke	28.47	h	Kayla Sanchez	Philippines	11 December 2025	2025 Southeast Asian Games	Bangkok, Thailand	
100m backstroke	1:01.64		Teia Salvino	Philippines	9 May 2023	2023 Southeast Asian Games	Phnom Penh, Cambodia	
200m backstroke	2:13.20		Xiandi Chua	Philippines	8 May 2023	2023 Southeast Asian Games	Phnom Penh, Cambodia	
50m breaststroke	31.03		Letitia Sim	Singapore	10 December 2025	2025 Southeast Asian Games	Bangkok, Thailand	
100m breaststroke	1:06.79		Letitia Sim	Singapore	13 December 2025	2025 Southeast Asian Games	Bangkok, Thailand	
200m breaststroke	2:27.37		Letitia Sim	Singapore	14 December 2025	2025 Southeast Asian Games	Bangkok, Thailand	
50m butterfly	26.42		Quah Ting Wen	Singapore	15 December 2025	2025 Southeast Asian Games	Bangkok, Thailand	
100m butterfly	58.84		Tao Li	Singapore	12 November 2011	2011 Southeast Asian Games	Palembang, Indonesia	
200m butterfly	2:09.52		Quah Jing Wen	Singapore	14 May 2022	2021 Southeast Asian Games	Hanoi, Vietnam	
200m individual medley	2:13.42		Letitia Sim	Singapore	11 December 2025	2025 Southeast Asian Games	Bangkok, Thailand	
400m individual medley	4:42.88		Nguyễn Thị Ánh Viên	Vietnam	6 June 2015	2015 Southeast Asian Games	Singapore, Singapore	
4×100m freestyle relay	3:40.92		Quah Ting Wen (54.80); Quah Jing Wen (56.01); Cherlyn Yeoh (54.96); Amanda Lim (55.15)	Singapore	7 December 2019	2019 Southeast Asian Games	New Clark City, Philippines	
4×200m freestyle relay	8:07.00		Gan Ching Hwee (2:02.30); Quah Ting Wen (2:00.69); Quah Jing Wen (2:02.15); Christie Chue (2:01.86)	Singapore	5 December 2019	2019 Southeast Asian Games	New Clark City, Philippines	
4×100m medley relay	4:05.79		Julia Yeo (1:04.79); Letitia Sim (1:05.92); Quah Jing Wen (59.93); Quah Ting Wen (55.15)	Singapore	15 December 2025	2025 Southeast Asian Games	Bangkok, Thailand	

Legend: WR – World record; AS – Asian record;
Records not set in finals: h – heat; sf – semifinal; r – relay 1st leg; rh – relay heat 1st leg; so – swim-off

== Mixed ==
Event	Time	Name	Nationality	Date	Meet	Location	Ref
4×100 m medley relay	3:51.72	Quah Zheng Wen (55.72); Nicholas Mahabir (1:00.80); Quah Jing Wen (58.88); Quah Ting Wen (56.32)	Singapore	9 May 2023	2023 Southeast Asian Games	Phnom Penh, Cambodia	

Legend: WR – World record; AS – Asian record;
Records not set in finals: h – heat; sf – semifinal; r – relay 1st leg; rh – relay heat 1st leg; so – swim-off

== Record holders' rankings ==
=== By nation ===
Nation	Record tally	Men	Women
Singapore	25	10	15
Vietnam	9	7	2
Philippines	3	0	3
Indonesia	2	2	0
Malaysia	1	1	0
Total	40	20	20

=== By individual (men) ===
The following lists athletes holding three or more records in Southeast Asian swimming.

Record count	Name	Nationality	Events
5	Joseph Isaac Schooling	Singapore	100 m freestyle 100 m butterfly 200 m butterfly 200 m individual medley 4×100 m freestyle relay
4	Quah Zheng Wen	Singapore	100 m backstroke 200 m backstroke 4×100 m freestyle relay 4×100 m medley relay
4	Nguyễn Huy Hoàng	Vietnam	400 m freestyle 800 m freestyle 1500 m freestyle 4×200 m freestyle relay

=== By individual (women) ===
The following lists athletes holding three or more records in Southeast Asian swimming.

Record count	Name	Nationality	Events
5	Quah Ting Wen	Singapore	100 m freestyle 50 m butterfly 4×100 m freestyle relay 4×200 m freestyle relay 4×100 m medley relay
5	Nguyễn Thị Ánh Viên	Vietnam	200 m freestyle 400 m freestyle 800 m freestyle 200 m individual medley 400 m individual medley
4	Quah Jing Wen	Singapore	200 m butterfly 4×100 m freestyle relay 4×200 m freestyle relay 4×100 m medley relay

== See also ==
- List of Southeast Asian Championships records in swimming
