= Hoàng Quý Phước =

Vietnamese swimmer (born 1993)

Hoang Quy Phuoc
Personal information
- Full name: Hoàng Quý Phước
- Nationality: Vietnam
- Born: March 24, 1993 (age 33) Đà Nẵng, Vietnam
- Height: 1.82 m (6 ft 0 in)
- Weight: 76 kg (168 lb)

Sport
- Sport: Swimming
- Strokes: Freestyle, Butterfly
- Coach: Nguyễn Tấn Quảng
Medal record
Representing Vietnam
Men's swimming
Southeast Asian Games
Gold medal – first place	2011 Palembang	100m butterfly
Gold medal – first place	2011 Palembang	100m freestyle
Gold medal – first place	2013 Naypyidaw	200m freestyle
Gold medal – first place	2015 Singapore	200m freestyle
Bronze medal – third place	2009 Vientiane	100m butterfly
Bronze medal – third place	2011 Palembang	50m butterfly
Bronze medal – third place	2019 Philippines	100m freestyle
Bronze medal – third place	2019 Philippines	200m freestyle
Bronze medal – third place	2021 Vietnam	200m freestyle
Southeast Asian Championships
Silver medal – second place	2012 Singapore	100m freestyle

Hoàng Quý Phước (born March 24, 1993; living in Đà Nẵng) is a male Vietnamese swimmer. He holds Vietnam's records, and became the first swimmer to reach Olympic Selection Time at the Malaysian Swimming Championship 2011. However, he failed to qualify for the Olympics.
