= Quah Jing Wen =

Singaporean swimmer (born 2000)

Personal information
- Born: 20 December 2000 (age 25) Singapore
- Height: 1.64 m (5 ft 5 in)
- Weight: 48 kg (106 lb)

Sport
- Sport: Swimming
- Strokes: Freestyle, Butterfly, Individual Medley
- College team: Texas A&M
Medal record
Women's swimming
Representing Singapore
| Event | 1st | 2nd | 3rd |
|---|---|---|---|
| Asian Games | 0 | 0 | 1 |
| Southeast Asian Games | 21 | 3 | 3 |
| Commonwealth Youth Games | 5 | 1 | 0 |
| Total | 26 | 4 | 4 |
Asian Games
| Bronze medal – third place | 2018 Jakarta | 4×100 m medley |
Southeast Asian Games
| Gold medal – first place | 2025 Thailand | 4×100 m medley |
| Gold medal – first place | 2023 Cambodia | 200 m butterfly |
| Gold medal – first place | 2023 Cambodia | 100 m butterfly |
| Gold medal – first place | 2023 Cambodia | 4×100 m freestyle |
| Gold medal – first place | 2023 Cambodia | 4×100 m mixed medley |
| Gold medal – first place | 2023 Cambodia | 4×100 m medley |
| Gold medal – first place | 2021 Vietnam | 200 m butterfly |
| Gold medal – first place | 2021 Vietnam | 100 m butterfly |
| Gold medal – first place | 2021 Vietnam | 200 m individual medley |
| Gold medal – first place | 2021 Vietnam | 4×100 m freestyle |
| Gold medal – first place | 2021 Vietnam | 4×100 m medley |
| Gold medal – first place | 2021 Vietnam | 4×200 m freestyle |
| Gold medal – first place | 2019 Philippines | 200 m butterfly |
| Gold medal – first place | 2019 Philippines | 4×200 m freestyle |
| Gold medal – first place | 2019 Philippines | 4×100 m freestyle |
| Gold medal – first place | 2019 Philippines | 4×100 m medley |
| Gold medal – first place | 2017 Kuala Lumpur | 200 m butterfly |
| Gold medal – first place | 2017 Kuala Lumpur | 4×100 m medley |
| Gold medal – first place | 2017 Kuala Lumpur | 4×100 m freestyle |
| Gold medal – first place | 2017 Kuala Lumpur | 4×200 m freestyle |
| Gold medal – first place | 2017 Kuala Lumpur | 100 m butterfly |
| Silver medal – second place | 2025 Thailand | 100 m butterfly |
| Silver medal – second place | 2025 Thailand | 4×100 m freestyle |
| Silver medal – second place | 2019 Philippines | 100m butterfly |
| Bronze medal – third place | 2025 Thailand | 200 m butterfly |
| Bronze medal – third place | 2015 Singapore | 400 m medley |
| Bronze medal – third place | 2021 Hanoi | 50 m butterfly |
Commonwealth Youth Games
| Gold medal – first place | Nassar 2017 | 100 m freestyle |
| Gold medal – first place | Nassar 2017 | 50 m butterfly |
| Gold medal – first place | Nassar 2017 | 100 m butterfly |
| Gold medal – first place | Nassar 2017 | 4×100 m freestyle |
| Gold medal – first place | Nassar 2017 | 4×100 m medley |
| Silver medal – second place | Nassar 2017 | 200 m butterfly |

Quah Jing Wen
- Simplified Chinese: 柯敬文
Transcriptions
Standard Mandarin
- Hanyu Pinyin: Kē Jìngwén
- Wade–Giles: Ke^{1} Jing^{4} wen^{2}

Quah Jing Wen (Chinese: 柯敬文; pinyin: Kē Jìngwén; born 20 December 2000) is a Singaporean professional swimmer who specialises in individual medley, butterfly and freestyle events.

== Education ==
Quah was educated at Methodist Girls' School and Anglo-Chinese School (Independent), before graduating from Texas A&M University in 2021 with a bachelor's degree in biomedical science.

== Swimming career ==
Quah Jing Wen clocked 2:12.95 and set an Under-17 200m butterfly Singaporean national record at the Neo Garden 13th Singapore National Swimming Championships, breaking Tao Li's record set in 2005.

Quah won the bronze in the 2015 SEA Games when making her debut in the 400m IM.

In 2017, Quah won 5 gold medals and a silver medal at the Commonwealth Youth Games, held in Nassau. In the same year, she also won 5 gold medals in the 2017 SEA Games.

== Personal life ==
Quah has an elder sister, Quah Ting Wen, and an elder brother, Quah Zheng Wen, who both are national swimmers of Singapore as well.

== See also ==
- Swimming at the Southeast Asian Games
