= Nguyễn Thị Ánh Viên =

Vietnamese swimmer (born 1996)

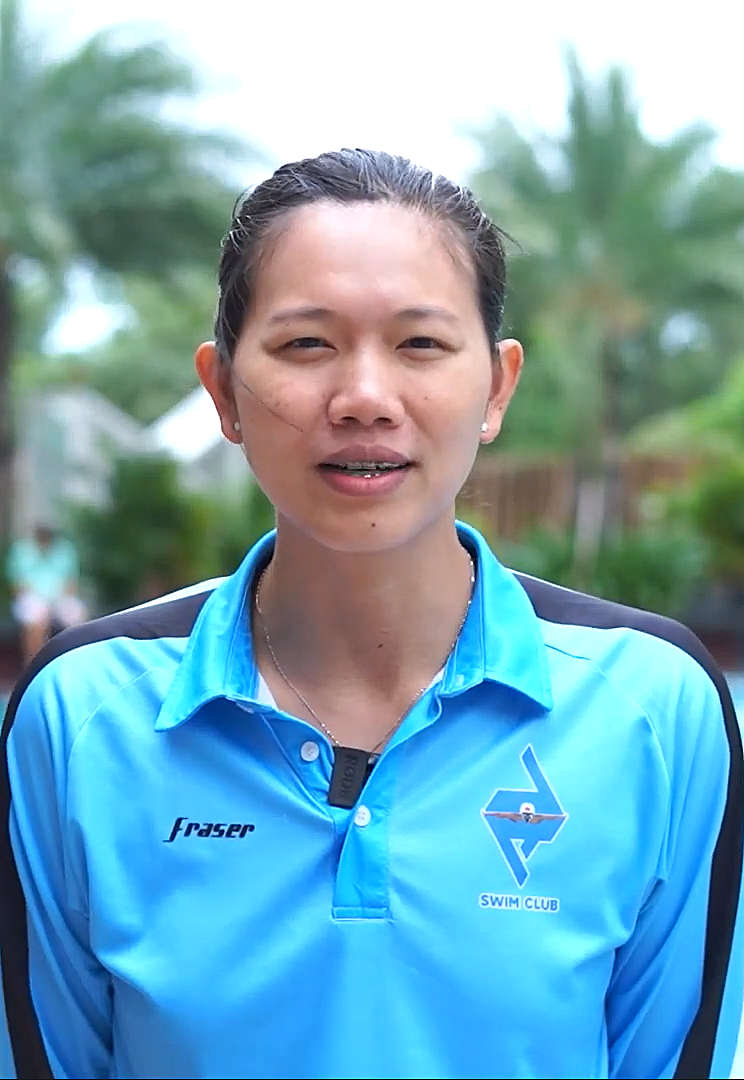

Personal information
- Full name: Nguyễn Thị Ánh Viên
- Nickname: "Tiểu tiên cá" (The little mermaid)
- National team: Vietnam
- Born: November 9, 1996 (age 30) Phong Điền, Cần Thơ, Vietnam
- Height: 1.72 m (5 ft 8 in)
- Weight: 60 kg (132 lb)

Sport
- Sport: Swimming
- Strokes: Backstroke, breaststroke, butterfly, freestyle, individual medley
- Coach: Đặng Anh Tuấn
Medal record
Women's swimming
Representing Vietnam
Event	1st	2nd	3rd
Asian Games	0	0	2
FINA World Cup	0	1	2
Asian Championships	1	1	4
Youth Olympic Games	1	0	0
Asian Youth Games	3	1	0
Southeast Asian Games	25	8	2
Southeast Asian Championships	12	0	0
Asian Indoor and Martial Arts Games	1	0	0
Military World Games	1	1	1
Total	44	11	11
Asian Games
Bronze medal – third place	2014 Incheon	200 m backstroke
Bronze medal – third place	2014 Incheon	400 m medley
FINA World Cup
Silver medal – second place	2015 Moscow	400 m medley
Bronze medal – third place	2015 Moscow	200 m medley
Bronze medal – third place	2015 Paris	400 m medley
Asian Championships
Gold medal – first place	2016 Tokyo	400 m medley
Silver medal – second place	2012 Dubai	200 m backstroke
Bronze medal – third place	2016 Tokyo	200 m medley
Bronze medal – third place	2016 Tokyo	200 m freestyle
Bronze medal – third place	2016 Tokyo	800 m freestyle
Bronze medal – third place	2012 Dubai	400 m medley
Youth Olympic Games
Gold medal – first place	2014 Nanjing	200 m medley
Asian Youth Games
Gold medal – first place	2013 Nanjing	50 m backstroke
Gold medal – first place	2013 Nanjing	200 m backstroke
Gold medal – first place	2013 Nanjing	200 m medley
Silver medal – second place	2013 Nanjing	100 m backstroke
Southeast Asian Games
Gold medal – first place	2013 Naypyidaw	200 m backstroke
Gold medal – first place	2013 Naypyidaw	200 m medley
Gold medal – first place	2013 Naypyidaw	400 m medley
Gold medal – first place	2015 Singapore	200 m freestyle
Gold medal – first place	2015 Singapore	400 m freestyle
Gold medal – first place	2015 Singapore	800 m freestyle
Gold medal – first place	2015 Singapore	200 m backstroke
Gold medal – first place	2015 Singapore	200 m breaststroke
Gold medal – first place	2015 Singapore	200 m butterfly
Gold medal – first place	2015 Singapore	200 m medley
Gold medal – first place	2015 Singapore	400 m medley
Gold medal – first place	2017 Kuala Lumpur	50 m backstroke
Gold medal – first place	2017 Kuala Lumpur	100 m backstroke
Gold medal – first place	2017 Kuala Lumpur	200 m backstroke
Gold medal – first place	2017 Kuala Lumpur	200 m freestyle
Gold medal – first place	2017 Kuala Lumpur	400 m freestyle
Gold medal – first place	2017 Kuala Lumpur	800 m freestyle
Gold medal – first place	2017 Kuala Lumpur	200 m medley
Gold medal – first place	2017 Kuala Lumpur	400 m medley
Gold medal – first place	2019 Philippines	200 m freestyle
Gold medal – first place	2019 Philippines	200 m backstroke
Gold medal – first place	2019 Philippines	200 m medley
Gold medal – first place	2019 Philippines	400 m medley
Gold medal – first place	2019 Philippines	400 m freestyle
Gold medal – first place	2019 Philippines	100 m backstroke
Silver medal – second place	2011 Palembang	100 m backstroke
Silver medal – second place	2011 Palembang	400 m medley
Silver medal – second place	2013 Naypyidaw	400 m freestyle
Silver medal – second place	2013 Naypyidaw	100 m backstroke
Silver medal – second place	2015 Singapore	100 m freestyle
Silver medal – second place	2017 Kuala Lumpur	200 m breaststroke
Silver medal – second place	2017 Kuala Lumpur	100 m freestyle
Silver medal – second place	2019 Philippines	50 m backstroke
Bronze medal – third place	2013 Naypyidaw	800 m freestyle
Bronze medal – third place	2015 Singapore	50 m backstroke
Southeast Asian Championships
Gold medal – first place	2012 Singapore	50 m backstroke
Gold medal – first place	2012 Singapore	100 m backstroke
Gold medal – first place	2012 Singapore	200 m backstroke
Gold medal – first place	2012 Singapore	200 m medley
Gold medal – first place	2012 Singapore	400 m medley
Gold medal – first place	2014 Singapore	400 m freestyle
Gold medal – first place	2014 Singapore	800 m freestyle
Gold medal – first place	2014 Singapore	50 m backstroke
Gold medal – first place	2014 Singapore	200 m backstroke
Gold medal – first place	2014 Singapore	200 m butterfly
Gold medal – first place	2014 Singapore	200 m medley
Gold medal – first place	2014 Singapore	400 m medley
Asian Indoor and Martial Arts Games
Gold medal – first place	2013 Incheon	200 m medley
Military World Games
Gold medal – first place	2015 Mungyeong	200m medley
Silver medal – second place	2015 Mungyeong	800 m freestyle
Bronze medal – third place	2015 Mungyeong	200m backstroke

Nguyễn Thị Ánh Viên (born November 9, 1996, in Cần Thơ) is a Vietnamese swimmer. She swam for Vietnam at the 2016 Olympics. At the 2014 Asian Games, she won Vietnam's first-ever medal in swimming. She has been named Vietnam's Athlete of the Year in both 2013 and 2014. By the end of 2014, she holds the Vietnamese records in 14 of the 17 long-course individual events. At the 2012 Olympics, she swam the 200 Backstroke and the 400 Individual Medley. In addition to her competitive swimming career, Ánh Viên also serves in the Vietnamese army in the rank of major.
