= Quah Ting Wen =

Singaporean swimmer (born 1992)

Personal information
- Born: 18 August 1992 (age 34) Singapore
- Height: 1.75 m (5 ft 9 in)

Sport
- Sport: Swimming
- Strokes: Butterfly, Freestyle, Individual Medley
- Club: DC Trident
- College team: University of California, Los Angeles
Medal record
Women's swimming
Event	1st	2nd	3rd
Asian Games	0	0	1
Southeast Asian Games	36	22	6
Asian Youth Games	4	0	1
Total	40	22	8
Asian Games
Bronze medal – third place	2018 Jakarta	4×100 m medley
Southeast Asian Games
Gold medal – first place	2007 Thailand	400 m medley
Gold medal – first place	2007 Thailand	4×100 m medley
Gold medal – first place	2009 Laos	100 m freestyle
Gold medal – first place	2009 Laos	200 m freestyle
Gold medal – first place	2009 Laos	4×100 m freestyle
Gold medal – first place	2009 Laos	4×200 m freestyle
Gold medal – first place	2009 Laos	4×100 m medley
Gold medal – first place	2013 Myanmar	4×200 m freestyle
Gold medal – first place	2013 Myanmar	4×100 m medley
Gold medal – first place	2015 Singapore	100 m freestyle
Gold medal – first place	2015 Singapore	4×100 m freestyle
Gold medal – first place	2015 Singapore	4×200 m freestyle
Gold medal – first place	2015 Singapore	4×100 m medley
Gold medal – first place	2017 Kuala Lumpur	100 m freestyle
Gold medal – first place	2017 Kuala Lumpur	50 m butterfly
Gold medal – first place	2017 Kuala Lumpur	4×100 m freestyle
Gold medal – first place	2017 Kuala Lumpur	4×200 m freestyle
Gold medal – first place	2019 Philippines	100 m freestyle
Gold medal – first place	2019 Philippines	50 m butterfly
Gold medal – first place	2019 Philippines	100 m butterfly
Gold medal – first place	2019 Philippines	4×100 m freestyle
Gold medal – first place	2019 Philippines	4×200 m freestyle
Gold medal – first place	2019 Philippines	4×100 m medley
Gold medal – first place	2021 Vietnam	100 m freestyle
Gold medal – first place	2021 Vietnam	4×100 m freestyle
Gold medal – first place	2021 Vietnam	4×100 m medley
Gold medal – first place	2021 Vietnam	4×200 m freestyle
Gold medal – first place	2023 Cambodia	50 m freestyle
Gold medal – first place	2023 Cambodia	100 m freestyle
Gold medal – first place	2023 Cambodia	4×100 m freestyle
Gold medal – first place	2023 Cambodia	4×200 m freestyle
Gold medal – first place	2023 Cambodia	4×100 m medley
Gold medal – first place	2023 Cambodia	4×100 m mixed medley
Gold medal – first place	2025 Thailand	50 m butterfly]]
Gold medal – first place	2025 Thailand	100 m butterfly
Gold medal – first place	2025 Thailand	4×100 m medley
Silver medal – second place	2005 Philippines	800 m freestyle
Silver medal – second place	2005 Philippines	4×200 m freestyle
Silver medal – second place	2007 Thailand	100 m freestyle
Silver medal – second place	2007 Thailand	200 m freestyle
Silver medal – second place	2007 Thailand	4×200 m freestyle
Silver medal – second place	2009 Laos	50 m freestyle
Silver medal – second place	2009 Laos	400 m medley
Silver medal – second place	2013 Myanmar	100 m freestyle
Silver medal – second place	2013 Myanmar	200 m freestyle
Silver medal – second place	2013 Myanmar	100 m butterfly
Silver medal – second place	2013 Myanmar	200 m butterfly
Silver medal – second place	2013 Myanmar	4×100 m freestyle
Silver medal – second place	2015 Singapore	50 m freestyle
Silver medal – second place	2015 Singapore	50 m butterfly
Silver medal – second place	2015 Singapore	100 m butterfly
Silver medal – second place	2015 Singapore	200 m butterfly
Silver medal – second place	2017 Kuala Lumpur	50 m freestyle
Silver medal – second place	2021 Hanoi	50 m butterfly
Silver medal – second place	2021 Hanoi	100 m butterfly
Silver medal – second place	2023 Phnom Penh	50 m butterfly
Silver medal – second place	2023 Phnom Penh	100 m butterfly
Silver medal – second place	2025 Thailand	4×100 m freestyle
Bronze medal – third place	2005 Philippines	400 m freestyle
Bronze medal – third place	2005 Philippines	400 m medley
Bronze medal – third place	2009 Laos	400 m freestyle
Bronze medal – third place	2017 Kuala Lumpur	100 m butterfly
Bronze medal – third place	2021 Vietnam	50 m freestyle
Bronze medal – third place	2025 Thailand	100 m freestyle
Asian Youth Games
Gold medal – first place	2009 Singapore	50 m freestyle
Gold medal – first place	2009 Singapore	100 m freestyle
Gold medal – first place	2009 Singapore	200 m freestyle
Gold medal – first place	2009 Singapore	4×100 m freestyle
Bronze medal – third place	2009 Singapore	4×100 m medley

Quah Ting Wen
- Simplified Chinese: 柯婷文
Transcriptions
Standard Mandarin
- Hanyu Pinyin: Kē Tíngwén
- Wade–Giles: Ke^{1}Ting^{2} wen^{2}

Quah Ting Wen (born 18 August 1992) is a Singaporean professional swimmer who specialises in butterfly, freestyle and individual medley events. She is currently representing DC Trident at the International Swimming League.

== Education ==
Quah was educated at Raffles Girls' School and Raffles Institution, before graduating from the University of California, Los Angeles in 2014.

== Swimming career ==
=== Collegiate level ===
Quah had represented the UCLA Bruins during her time at the University of California, Los Angeles.

=== International level ===
==== 2005 Southeast Asian Games ====
Quah first represented Singapore on the international level in the 2005 Southeast Asian Games.

==== 2008 Olympic Games ====
At the 2008 Olympic Games, Quah failed to qualify in the heats of the 400m Individual Medley event but set a new national record (4:51.25).

==== 2009 Asian Youth Games ====
Quah was Singapore's flag bearer for the 2009 Asian Youth Games. She won three individual gold medals in the 50 m, 100 m and 200 m freestyle events while setting national records for all three (25.43, 55.57 and 1:59.21). She won the team gold and bronze medals in the 4 × 100 m freestyle relay and 4 × 100 m medley relay events, respectively.

==== 2013 FINA Swimming World Cup ====
Quah set a new national record in the 200 m freestyle event in the second leg of the 2013 FINA Swimming World Cup, held in Berlin, Germany. Her new timing of 1:58.80 was 0.09 seconds faster than Lynette Lim's three-day-old record of 1:58.89.

==== Southeast Asian Games ====
Quah has represented Singapore and won, at the following games:

- 2005 Southeast Asian Games (2 silvers, 2 bronzes)
- 2007 Southeast Asian Games (2 golds, 3 silvers)
- 2009 Southeast Asian Games (5 golds, 2 silvers, 1 bronze)
- 2013 Southeast Asian Games (2 golds, 5 silvers)
- 2015 Southeast Asian Games(4 golds, 4 silvers)
- 2017 Southeast Asian Games (4 golds, 1 silver, 1 bronze)
- 2019 Southeast Asian Games (6 golds)
- 2021 Southeast Asian Games (4 golds, 2 silvers, 1 bronze)
- 2023 Southeast Asian Games (6 golds, 2 silvers)

== Personal life ==
Quah has a younger brother, Quah Zheng Wen, and a younger sister, Quah Jing Wen, who both are national swimmers of Singapore as well.
