= Quah Zheng Wen =

Singaporean swimmer (born 1996)

Personal information
- Full name: Quah Zheng Wen
- Born: 29 September 1996 (age 29) Singapore
- Height: 1.77 m (5 ft 10 in)

Sport
- Sport: Swimming
- Strokes: Backstroke, Butterfly, Freestyle, Individual Medley
- College team: University of California, Berkeley
- Coach: Gary Tan
Medal record
Men's swimming
Representing Singapore
Event	1st	2nd	3rd
Asian Games	0	0	2
Southeast Asian Games	36	15	7
Asian Youth Games	3	2	2
Total	39	17	11
Asian Games
Bronze medal – third place	2018 Jakarta	4×100 m freestyle
Bronze medal – third place	2018 Jakarta	4×200 m freestyle
Southeast Asian Games
Gold medal – first place	2011 Palembang	400 m medley
Gold medal – first place	2013 Naypyidaw	400 m medley
Gold medal – first place	2013 Naypyidaw	4×100 m medley
Gold medal – first place	2013 Naypyidaw	4×200 m freestyle
Gold medal – first place	2015 Singapore	50 m backstroke
Gold medal – first place	2015 Singapore	100 m backstroke
Gold medal – first place	2015 Singapore	200 m backstroke
Gold medal – first place	2015 Singapore	400 m medley
Gold medal – first place	2015 Singapore	4×100 m freestyle
Gold medal – first place	2015 Singapore	4×200 m freestyle
Gold medal – first place	2015 Singapore	4×100 m medley
Gold medal – first place	2017 Kuala Lumpur	200 m butterfly
Gold medal – first place	2017 Kuala Lumpur	4×100 m freestyle
Gold medal – first place	2017 Kuala Lumpur	100 m backstroke
Gold medal – first place	2017 Kuala Lumpur	200 m backstroke
Gold medal – first place	2017 Kuala Lumpur	4×200 m freestyle
Gold medal – first place	2017 Kuala Lumpur	4×100 m medley
Gold medal – first place	2019 Philippines	100 m backstroke
Gold medal – first place	2019 Philippines	200 m backstroke
Gold medal – first place	2019 Philippines	4×100 m freestyle
Gold medal – first place	2019 Philippines	4×200 m freestyle
Gold medal – first place	2019 Philippines	200 m butterfly
Gold medal – first place	2019 Philippines	4×100 m medley
Gold medal – first place	2021 Vietnam	100 m backstroke
Gold medal – first place	2021 Vietnam	100 m freestyle
Gold medal – first place	2021 Vietnam	4×100 m medley
Gold medal – first place	2021 Vietnam	50 m backstroke
Gold medal – first place	2023 Cambodia	100 m backstroke
Gold medal – first place	2023 Cambodia	100 m butterfly
Gold medal – first place	2023 Cambodia	4×100 m medley
Gold medal – first place	2023 Cambodia	4×100 m mixed medley
Gold medal – first place	2023 Cambodia	4×100 m freestyle
Gold medal – first place	2025 Thailand	100 m butterfly
Gold medal – first place	2025 Thailand	200 m backstroke
Gold medal – first place	2025 Thailand	4×100 m freestyle
Gold medal – first place	2025 Thailand	4×100 m medley
Silver medal – second place	2011 Palembang	200 m butterfly
Silver medal – second place	2013 Naypyidaw	100 m backstroke
Silver medal – second place	2013 Naypyidaw	200 m butterfly
Silver medal – second place	2015 Singapore	200 m medley
Silver medal – second place	2015 Singapore	200 m butterfly
Silver medal – second place	2015 Singapore	100 m freestyle
Silver medal – second place	2015 Singapore	200 m freestyle
Silver medal – second place	2017 Kuala Lumpur	50 m backstroke
Silver medal – second place	2019 Philippines	50 m backstroke
Silver medal – second place	2019 Philippines	100 m butterfly
Silver medal – second place	2021 Hanoi	100 m butterfly
Silver medal – second place	2021 Hanoi	200 m freestyle
Silver medal – second place	2025 Thailand	50 m backstroke
Silver medal – second place	2025 Thailand	50 m butterfly
Silver medal – second place	2025 Thailand	100 m freestyle
Bronze medal – third place	2011 Palembang	50 m backstroke
Bronze medal – third place	2013 Naypyidaw	200 m freestyle
Bronze medal – third place	2015 Singapore	50 m butterfly
Bronze medal – third place	2021 Vietnam	4×200 m freestyle
Bronze medal – third place	2023 Cambodia	50 m backstroke
Bronze medal – third place	2025 Thailand	100 m backstroke
Bronze medal – third place	2025 Thailand	4×200 m freestyle
Asian Youth Games
Gold medal – first place	2013 Nanjing	200 m backstroke
Gold medal – first place	2013 Nanjing	200 m butterfly
Gold medal – first place	2013 Nanjing	200 m medley
Silver medal – second place	2013 Nanjing	200 m freestyle
Silver medal – second place	2013 Nanjing	4×100 m freestyle
Bronze medal – third place	2013 Nanjing	4×100 m medley

Quah Zheng Wen
- Simplified Chinese: 柯正文
Transcriptions
Standard Mandarin
- Hanyu Pinyin: Kē Zhèngwén
- Wade–Giles: Ke^{1} Zheng^{4} wen^{2}

Quah Zheng Wen (Chinese: 柯正文; pinyin: Kē Zhèngwén; born 29 September 1996) is a Singaporean professional swimmer who specialises in individual medley, backstroke, butterfly and freestyle events.

== Education ==
Quah was educated at Anglo-Chinese School (Independent) and had achieved 43 points out of a possible 45 for his IB Diploma.

After completing his IB Diploma Programme, Quah was accepted into the Yong Loo Lin School of Medicine at the National University of Singapore, but chose to defer his studies. He subsequently went on to enroll at the University of California, Berkeley in 2017, before graduating in 2021 with a degree in Molecular Cell Biology (Neurobiology Subcategory).

== Swimming career ==
In June 2012, he set a national record in the 200 m individual medley. At the 2012 Summer Olympics he finished 33rd overall in the heats in the Men's 400 metre individual medley and failed to reach the final. Quah was Singapore's flag bearer for the 2013 Asian Youth Games. He won three individual gold medals and a silver medal at the 200 m backstroke, 200 m butterfly, 200 m individual medley and 200 m freestyle events respectively. He won the team silver and bronze medals at the 4 × 100 m freestyle relay and 4 × 100 m medley relay events.

At the 2015 Southeast Asian Games held in Singapore, Quah took part in 12 events, winning seven golds, four silvers and a bronze. He broke six Games records – three individual and three relays. In the men's 4 × 100 m medley relay which consisted of Quah, Joseph Schooling, Clement Lim and Lionel Khoo, the team finished the race in 3:38.25, erasing the old record of 3:41.35 set in 2011.

At the 2016 Rio Olympics, Quah achieved a personal best time in 200 meters butterfly in the heats. He was the first male Singaporean to qualify for a semifinal berth at an Olympics swim competition. He is one of two Singaporean male swimmers to have qualified for two semi-final berths at the Olympics.

Due to his potential at winning Olympic medals for Singapore, Quah was granted National Service (NS) deferment until the 2020 Olympic Games. Due to the COVID-19 pandemic, the 2020 Olympic Games was delayed to 2021 and his NS deferment was extended to 2021.

In the 2020 Olympic Games, Quah competed in the 100m butterfly, the 200m butterfly and the 100m backstroke. He failed to clock personal best times and did not make it to the semi-finals for the three events.

Quah returned to Singapore after a 5-year programme at the University of California, Berkeley, and is currently serving his National Service. However, Quah noted that he was "at a crossroads of some big life decisions" and desires to continue swimming.

== Personal life ==
Quah has an elder sister, Quah Ting Wen, and a younger sister, Quah Jing Wen, who both are national swimmers of Singapore as well.
