= UEFA Euro 2008 bids =

Bidding process for 2008 UEFA European Football Championship

The bidding process for UEFA Euro 2008 ended on 12 December 2002 when a joint bid from Austria and Switzerland was selected as the host.

== History ==
When the deadline for bids to be entered closed in June 2002, seven bids representing twelve countries had been submitted:

- Austria–Switzerland (joint bid)
- Bosnia and Herzegovina–Croatia (joint bid)
- Greece–Turkey (joint bid)
- Denmark–Finland–Norway–Sweden (joint bid titled Nordic 2008)
- Hungary
- Russia
- Scotland–Republic of Ireland (joint bid)

UEFA's National Teams Committee made a recommendation based on technical evaluation of the candidates on 12 December 2002, and concluded that only four bids had the capability of organising the tournament. These were ranked as follows:

1. Austria–Switzerland
2. Hungary
3. Greece–Turkey
4. Denmark–Finland–Norway–Sweden

Later that day, members of the UEFA Executive Committee voted on the bids and Austria–Switzerland was selected as the winner.

== Bids ==
=== Austria–Switzerland ===
Austria and Switzerland were selected to be the joint hosts of Euro 2008. The stadiums named in the bid process were:

- (Austria) Tivoli-Neu, Innsbruck
- (Austria) Wörthersee Stadion, Klagenfurt
- (Austria) Stadion Wals-Siezenheim, Salzburg
- (Austria) Ernst-Happel-Stadion, Vienna
- (Switzerland) St. Jakob-Park, Basel
- (Switzerland) Stadion Wankdorf, Bern
- (Switzerland) Stade de Genève, Geneva
- (Switzerland) Letzigrund, Zürich

== Bosnia and Herzegovina–Croatia ==
(Croatia) Zagreb	(Croatia) Split	(Croatia) Osijek	(Croatia) Rijeka
Maksimir Stadium	Poljud Stadium	Gradski Vrt Stadium	Kantrida Stadium
Capacity: 60,000 (expanded from 45,000)	Capacity: 40,000 (expanded from 34,374)	Capacity: 30,000 (expanded from 19,220)	Capacity: 30,000 (expanded from 12,000)
UEFA Euro 2008 bids is located in Croatia		UEFA Euro 2008 bids is located in Bosnia and Herzegovina	
(Bosnia and Herzegovina) Sarajevo	(Bosnia and Herzegovina) Mostar	(Bosnia and Herzegovina) Banja Luka	(Bosnia and Herzegovina) Zenica
Koševo Stadium	Bijeli Brijeg Stadium	Banja Luka Municipal Stadium	Bilino Polje Stadium
Capacity: 50,000 (expanded from 37,500)	Capacity: 30,000 (expanded from 15,000)	Capacity: 30,000 (expanded from 15,000)	Capacity: 30,000 (expanded from 20,000)

Eight venues in eight cities across Croatia and Bosnia and Herzegovina were proposed to host matches at Euro 2008. According to Croatian football executive Ivan Brleković, the stadiums could have been renovated, with a promised €50 million investment earmarked by both countries' governments, while more funding had been secured for upgrading road infrastructure linking host cities.

Croatia

- (Croatia) Zagreb – Maksimir Stadium (capacity 45,000; planned to be expanded to 60,000)
- (Croatia) Split – Poljud Stadium (capacity 34,374; planned to be expanded to 40,000)
- (Croatia) Osijek – Gradski Vrt Stadium (capacity 19,220; planned to be expanded to 30,000)
- (Croatia) Rijeka – Kantrida Stadium (capacity 12,000; planned to be expanded to 30,000)

Bosnia and Herzegovina

- (Bosnia and Herzegovina) Sarajevo – Koševo Stadium (capacity 37,500; planned to be expanded to 50,000)
- (Bosnia and Herzegovina) Mostar – Bijeli Brijeg Stadium (capacity 15,000; planned to be expanded to 30,000)
- (Bosnia and Herzegovina) Banja Luka – Banja Luka Municipal Stadium (capacity 15,000; planned to be expanded to 30,000)
- (Bosnia and Herzegovina) Zenica – Bilino Polje Stadium (capacity 20,000; planned to be expanded to 30,000)

== Greece–Turkey ==
Seven stadia in seven cities across Greece and Turkey were proposed to host matches at Euro 2008. Turkey set a budget of €50 million for the competition to construct a new stadium in Antalya, and €25 million to improve the Atatürk Stadium in İzmir. Greece had a budget of €50 million for stadium construction.

- (Greece) Olympic Stadium, Athens
- (Greece) Kaftanzoglio Stadium, Thessaloniki
- (Greece) Pankritio Stadium, Heraklion
- (Greece) Pampeloponnisiako Stadium, Patras
- (Turkey) Atatürk Olympic Stadium, Istanbul
- (Turkey) New Antalya Stadium, Antalya
- (Turkey) İzmir Atatürk Stadium, İzmir

== Nordic 2008 ==
Location of the proposed Nordic venues

Four Nordic countries (Denmark, Finland, Norway and Sweden) had submitted a joint bid titled Nordic 2008. Eight venues selected for the bid included capitals of all four nations: The bid was announced in October 2001.

- (Denmark) Copenhagen – Parken Stadium (38,065)
- (Denmark) Copenhagen – Brøndby Stadium (29,000)
- (Finland) Helsinki – Olympic Stadium (40,600)
- (Finland) Tampere – Ratina Stadium (17,000)
- (Norway) Oslo – Ullevaal Stadion (25,572)
- (Norway) Trondheim – Lerkendal Stadion (21,116)
- (Sweden) Gothenburg – Ullevi Stadium (43,000)
- (Sweden) Stockholm – Råsunda Stadium (36,608)

== Scotland–Republic of Ireland ==
In June 2000, the SFA refused to rule out a four-way bid consisting Scotland–Northern Ireland–Wales–Republic of Ireland. In July 2000, David Taylor announced the bid would enhance if England failed to secure the 2006 FIFA World Cup.

On 6 July 2000, England was eliminated from the second round of voting for the host of the 2006 FIFA World Cup. In February 2002, the Scottish Football Association (SFA), and the Football Association of Ireland (FAI), officially confirmed their joint bid to host the 2008 European Championship.

The chief executive of the SFA, David Taylor, said that the bid envisioned Scotland hosting the opening match, three group stages, three quarter-finals, one semi-final and the final, with the Republic of Ireland hosting one group stage, one quarter-final, and one semi-final.

The final bid saw changes to the initial plan with stadia in Scotland hosting both semi-finals, as well as the final. Murrayfield would be the final venue, with Hampden and Celtic Park each hosting a semi-final match.

The eight venues would have been:

- (Scotland) Hampden Park, Glasgow (52,063)
- (Scotland) Ibrox Stadium, Glasgow (51,082)
- (Scotland) Celtic Park, Glasgow (60,832)
- (Scotland) Murrayfield Stadium, Edinburgh (67,200)

Two of the following three:

- (Scotland) Easter Road, Edinburgh (20,421, expanded to 34,880)
- (Scotland) New Aberdeen Stadium, Aberdeen (31,400)
- (Scotland) New Dundee Stadium, Dundee (31,400)

Two of the following three:

- (Republic of Ireland) Croke Park, Dublin (82,300)
- (Republic of Ireland) Lansdowne Road, Dublin (36,000, expanded to 51,700)
- (Republic of Ireland) New Dublin Stadium (Stadium Ireland), Abbotstown, Castleknock (80,000)

(Scotland) Glasgow	(Scotland) Glasgow	(Scotland) Glasgow	(Scotland) Edinburgh
Hampden Park	Celtic Park	Ibrox Stadium	Murrayfield Stadium
Capacity: 52,063	Capacity: 60,832	Capacity: 51,082	Capacity: 67,200
(Scotland) Edinburgh	UEFA Euro 2008 bids is located in Scotland	UEFA Euro 2008 bids is located in Ireland	(Scotland) Aberdeen
Easter Road	UEFA Euro 2008 bids is located in Scotland	UEFA Euro 2008 bids is located in Ireland	New Aberdeen Stadium
Capacity: 34,880 (expanded from 20,421)	UEFA Euro 2008 bids is located in Scotland	UEFA Euro 2008 bids is located in Ireland	Capacity: 31,400 (new stadium)
(Scotland) Dundee	(Republic of Ireland) Dublin	(Republic of Ireland) Dublin	(Republic of Ireland) Abbotstown, Castleknock
New Dundee Stadium	Croke Park	Landsdown Road	New Dublin Stadium
Capacity: 31,400 (new stadium)	Capacity: 82,300	Capacity: 51,700 (expanded from 36,000)	Capacity: 80,000 (new stadium)

Had the bid been successful, the new stadium in Aberdeen would have been used by Aberdeen, replacing their current Pittodrie Stadium, while the new stadium in Dundee would have been shared by Dundee, Dundee United, and the Scottish Claymores American football team, replacing both Dens Park and Tannadice Park, following the competition.

It was envisioned that Stadium Ireland would become the home of the Irish national football and rugby union teams, as well as a national stadium for Gaelic games within Ireland.
