= National Sports Complex =

National Sports Complex may refer to:

- KL Sports City
- National Sports Complex, Purbachal
- Morodok Techo National Sports Complex
- Olimpiyskiy National Sports Complex
- Tenaga National Sports Complex
- World Games/National Sports Complex metro station, Kaohsiung, Taiwan

== See also ==
- National Sports Stadium (disambiguation)
