= Swimming at the 2017 SEA Games – Men's 400 metre freestyle =

Swimming – Men's 400 metre freestyle at the 2017 SEA Games
- Venue: National Aquatic Centre
- Date: 21 August 2017
- Competitors: 11 from 7 nations
- Winning time: 3:50.26 GR

Medalists
gold medal	Welson Sim Wee Sheng	Malaysia
silver medal	Aflah Fadlan Prawira	Indonesia
bronze medal	Nguyễn Hữu Kim Sơn	Vietnam

The men's 400 metre freestyle competition of the swimming event at the 2017 SEA Games was held on 21 August at the National Aquatic Centre in Kuala Lumpur, Malaysia.

== Records ==
Prior to this competition, the existing Asian and Games records were as follows:

Asian Record	Sun Yang (CHN)	3:40.14	London, Great Britain	28 July 2012
Games Record	Welson Sim Wee Sheng (MAS)	3:53.97	Singapore, Singapore	11 June 2015

== Schedule ==
All times are Malaysia Standard Time (UTC+08:00)

Date	Time	Event
Monday, 21 August 2017	09:20	Heat 1
Monday, 21 August 2017	09:20	Heat 2
Monday, 21 August 2017	19:15	Final

== Results ==
=== Heats ===
The heats were held on 21 August.

==== Heat 1 ====
Source: Heat 1 results

Rank	Lane	Athletes	Time	Notes
1	4	Aflah Fadlan Prawira (INA)	03:59.32	Q
2	5	Tanakrit Kittiya (THA)	04:01.21	Q
3	3	Jessie Khing Lacuna (PHI)	04:01.84	Q
4	6	Putera Muhammad Randa (INA)	04:02.30	Q
–	2	Hoàng Quý Phước (VIE)	DNS	

==== Heat 2 ====
Source: Heat 2 results

Rank	Lane	Athletes	Time	Notes
1	4	Welson Sim Wee Sheng (MAS)	03:56.20	Q
3	5	Pang Sheng Jun (SGP)	03:59.80	Q
2	7	Nguyễn Hữu Kim Sơn (VIE)	04:00.44	Q
4	3	Yeap Zheng Yang (MAS)	04:03.09	Q
5	6	Benedict Boon (SGP)	04:03.85	
6	2	Ahnt Khaung Htut (MYA)	04:31.80	

=== Final ===
Source: Final Results

The final was held on 21 August.

Rank	Lane	Athletes	Time	Notes
1st place, gold medalist(s)	4	Welson Sim Wee Sheng (MAS)	3:50.26	GR
2nd place, silver medalist(s)	5	Aflah Fadlan Prawira (INA)	3:54.15	
3rd place, bronze medalist(s)	6	Nguyễn Hữu Kim Sơn (VIE)	3:54.20	
4	3	Pang Sheng Jun (SGP)	3:54.64	
5	2	Tanakrit Kittiya (THA)	3:59.45	
6	7	Jessie Khing Lacuna (PHI)	4:00.82	
7	8	Yeap Zheng Yang (MAS)	4:00.98	
8	1	Putera Muhammad Randa (INA)	4:04.20	
