= National Aquatic Centre (disambiguation) =

National Aquatic Centre or National Aquatics Centre may refer to:

- Sport Ireland National Aquatic Centre, Blanchardstown, Dublin, Ireland
- Beijing National Aquatics Center, also known as the Water Cube, the site of the 2008 Summer Olympics
- National Aquatic Centre, National Sports Complex, Malaysia
- National Aquatic Centre, Couva, Trinidad and Tobago
