= Scotland–Ireland Euro 2008 bid =

Unsuccessful bid to host UEFA football championship

Scotland–Ireland '08 was an unsuccessful bid by the Scottish Football Association (SFA) and the Football Association of Ireland (FAI) to host the 2008 UEFA European Championships. In February 2002, the Scottish FA and the FA of Ireland officially confirmed a joint bid for Scotland and the Republic of Ireland to host the 2008 UEFA European Championships. Had the bid been successful, it would have been the first major competition hosted by both nations and the first held on the British Isles since UEFA Euro 1996, hosted by England.

By the conclusion of the bidding process, Scotland had hosted three major international tournaments at youth level, the 1970 UEFA European Under-18 Championship, the 1989 FIFA U-16 World Championship and the 1998 UEFA European Under-16 Championship, as well as three UEFA Champions League finals and a UEFA Cup Winners' Cup final. Ireland had no experience in hosting international football tournaments at any level, although they hosted matches in the Rugby World Cup in 1991 and 1999 along with Scotland and the other Five Nations countries.

== History ==
Prior to the official announcement of the bid between Scotland and the Republic of Ireland, the Scottish FA refused to rule-out a four-way Celtic bid consisting Scotland, Northern Ireland, Wales and the Republic of Ireland. This four-way proposal never came to fruition.

In the summer of 2000, the FAI chief executive Bernard O’Byrne held an exploratory meeting with his counterparts from the SFA, Irish Football Association and Football Association of Wales regarding the possibility of a four-way Celtic bid for Euro 2008.

I convened a meeting of the Scottish FA, the Welsh FA and the Northern Ireland FA. We were out in Geneva at the time. I put a proposal to them that we look at making a bid for the European championships. There were a few meetings about that but it went nowhere because Wales and Northern Ireland stepped back from it.

— Bernard O’Byrne

In July 2000, SFA chief executive David Taylor announced that Scotland would bid to host the European Championships in 2008, with the preference of the Scottish FA at the time being for Scotland to host the tournament of its own. However, Taylor noted "if we have to broaden it out and talk to other nations, we would." At the same time, Taylor announced the bid would enhance if England failed to the secure hosting rights for the 2006 FIFA World Cup. On 6 July 2000, England was eliminated from the second round of voting for the host of the 2006 FIFA World Cup, which was ultimately won by Germany.

In May 2001, the SFA and the Scottish Executive gave their support, in principle, to Scotland hosting the European Championships after a report said there were no "insurmountable" problems, with Scottish First Minister Henry McLeish pledging the full backing of the Executive to a bid by Scotland on its own. McLeish resigned from his position as First Minister in November 2001, amid a scandal involving allegations that he sublet part of his Westminster constituency office without declaring the income from the sublets when he claimed his office expenses.

The new First Minister Jack McConnell withdrew support for a solo Scottish bid, favouring a joint bid with Ireland following UEFA's decision to require eight stadia from the host country, rather than the previous six.

As a football fan and a Scot I understand the excitement and enthusiasm behind the argument of Scotland going it alone. However, when it became apparent that eight stadiums rather than six would be required to stage the event, a solo bid was not an option. In economic terms, Scotland simply could not sustain eight major stadiums of the size required. That’s why we joined forces with our friends in Ireland to put forward a bid that combined the best of both our nations.

— Jack McConnell

The proposal for a joint bid between Scotland and Ireland was approved by the FAI and, on 27 February 2002, a letter was sent to UEFA announcing the Irish and Scottish intention to bid for the tournament. On 29 May, the bidding team sent a document detailing their proposals for hosting the competition to UEFA.

On 15 May 2002, Hampden Park in Glasgow hosted the 2002 UEFA Champions League Final between Bayer Leverkusen and Real Madrid, with an estimated £15 million boost for the local economy. Organisers of the final believed that the showcase final could help the bid to host the 2008 European Championships.

Simon Lyons, marketing director for the bid, noted that Scotland and Ireland offered the most seats of any bid, 1.7 million, at the eight stadia which would be used, with the four-way Nordic bid being the closest to this with 1.2 million seats. Lyons also noted the friendly atmosphere from both Ireland and Scotland fans in recent tournaments and the passion for football in both nations as another reason for UEFA to support the bid.

On 16 September 2002, UEFA's inspectors began their five-day visit to the bidding countries. It was reported that Croke Park had been identified as a potential UEFA Champions League final venue as a result of the inspection, should the Gaelic Athletic Association (GAA) abolish Rule 42 of their constitution preventing competitor sports to Gaelic sports to be played at the stadium. The, then new, GAA president Sean Kelly appeared to favour softening the organisations regulations for the tournament. UEFA's technical report gave the Scotland–Ireland bid a score of 94%, a percentage point lower than the Austria–Switzerland bid which had the best technical report.

On 12 December 2002, UEFA awarded the Championships to Austria and Switzerland, with UEFA's national team committee putting forward Austria-Switzerland, Greece-Turkey, Hungary and the four-way Nordic bid as their recommendations of the four best bids ahead of the final vote. The Scotland–Ireland bid came fourth overall in the final vote.

== Venues ==
The proposed host cities in Scotland
The proposed host cities in Ireland

Bidding nations were required to provide eight stadia to be used for the tournament. The bid consisted of ten potential stadia within six locations, which would be reduced to eight for the final competition. Glasgow, Edinburgh and Dublin all had multiple stadia within their cities that could have been used for the tournament.

The bid included using the three major football stadia in Glasgow - each requiring little modification due to recent renovations. Ibrox, the home of Rangers, had been rebuilt in between 1978 and 1981 in response to the 1971 Ibrox disaster, replacing the historic ground with a state-of-the-art all-seater stadium. Further renovations took place in 90s to expand the stadium to over 50,000 seats. The Taylor Report, into the 1989 Hillsborough disaster, made redevelopment of Glasgow's two other major football stadia necessary to comply with new ground regulations. Celtic Park, owned by Celtic, was completely rebuilt over a four year period from 1994 to 1998, making it the largest club ground in the whole UK at the time of completion. Hampden Park was the national football stadium in Scotland and had been re-developed in a number of stages across the 90s. The final phase was completed in 1999, with the 1999 Scottish Cup Final being the first match at the ground since the completion of the project.

Two stadia in the Scottish capital, Edinburgh, were earmarked for the bid. Murrayfield, the national rugby union ground, had also gone through major re-development in the 1990s, becoming the largest stadium in Scotland in the process. Easter Road underwent work in the previous decade, but would have required expansion to comply with the requirements to host European Championship matches - UEFA sets the minimum capacity for venues at 30,000. The East Stand would have been replaced by a new three-tier stand to double the capacity of the stadium.

Aberdeen and Dundee would have potentially seen new stadia to replace the existing grounds in the two cities. Aberdeen's Pittodrie Stadium would have been replaced with a 31,400 seat stadium as part of a modern leisure park on the outskirts of the city, which would incorporate a football academy. The football club would move into the new stadium following the completion of the tournament. The new stadium in Dundee would replace two existing stadia in the city: Dens Park, owned by Dundee, and Tannadice Park, owned by Dundee United. Both football clubs would share the stadium, a rarity for professional football in the UK, with the Scottish Claymores American football team relocating from Hampden Park in order to play matches at the new stadium. The ground would feature a retractable roof.

Only two of the three of a renovated Easter Road and the new stadia in Aberdeen and Dundee would have been used as part of the bid, with the three Glasgow stadia and Murrayfield being confirmed stadia by the conclusion of the bidding process.

Three stadia were included as potential venues within the Republic of Ireland, while only two would be used. The Gaelic Athletic Association's (GAA) Croke Park, in Dublin, was the biggest stadium in Ireland and had been going through extensive renovation at the time of the bid, being completed in 2004. The stadium hosted the finals of the All-Ireland Senior Football Championship, in Gaelic football, and the All-Ireland Senior Hurling Championship. A major sticking point of using Croke Park was the GAA's rules on allowing 'foreign' sports to take place at the ground. The GAA constitution, up until 1971, had been stricter, however, stating a member of the organisation could be banned from competing in Gaelic sports if found to be also playing association football, rugby or cricket. The years following the conclusion of the bid, the GAA allowed both the Football Association of Ireland and the Irish Rugby Football Union to play their respective sports at the stadium during the redevelopment of Lansdowne Road.

Proposals to erect a new stadium in Abbotstown, Castleknock were also made, with most of the funding coming from the Irish Government. The stadium, called Stadium Ireland, was viewed to be central to the Irish part of the bid, but plans to construct the ground were aborted despite over €500 million (£315m) being spent on the project. The Fianna Fáil/Progressive Democrat centre-right coalition in Ireland had made major spending cuts in the country prior to UEFA's vote on hosting the Championships, which was considered the primary reason for the plug being pulled on the project. Had the stadium been built, it was envisioned that it would have become the home of the Irish national football and rugby union teams, as well as a national stadium for Gaelic games within Ireland.

Dublin's Lansdowne Road was also part of the proposals that would've seen the stadium redeveloped had the Stadium Ireland project collapsed. The stadium was owned by the Irish Rugby Football Union (IRFU), with an all-seated capacity of 36,000, requiring the use of temporary seating to reach this figure due to the presence of terracing within the stadium. There were 23,000 permanent seats in the stadium. In the years following the bid, the stadium was replaced by the 51,700 seat Aviva Stadium, partially built with money initially planned to go Stadium Ireland project. The IRFU and the FAI contributed money towards the project, as well. The new stadium opened in 2010.

SFA's chief executive David Taylor said that the bid envisioned Scotland hosting the opening match, three group stages, three quarter finals, one semi final and the final match, with the Republic of Ireland staging one group phase, one quarter final and one semi final. The final bid saw changes to the initial plan with stadia in Scotland hosting both semi-finals, as well as the final. Murrayfield would be the final venue, with Hampden and Celtic Park each hosting a semi-final match.

=== List of venues ===
The following venues would have been used for the finals:

Image	Stadium	City	Current capacity	Planned capacity	Owner	Use	Notes
	Murrayfield Stadium	Edinburgh, Scotland	67,200	67,200	Scottish Rugby Union	Scottish national rugby union team, Edinburgh Rugby	Proposed final venue
	Celtic Park	Glasgow, Scotland	60,832	60,832	Celtic Football Club	Celtic	Proposed semi-final venue
	Hampden Park	Glasgow, Scotland	52,063	52,063	Queen's Park Football Club	Queen's Park, Scotland national football team	Proposed semi-final venue
	Ibrox Stadium	Glasgow, Scotland	51,082	51,082	Rangers Football Club	Rangers	
	Easter Road	Edinburgh, Scotland	20,421	34,880	Hibernian Football Club	Hibernian	Two out of three stadia out of Easter Road and the new stadia in Aberdeen and Dundee would have been used.
	New Aberdeen Stadium	Aberdeen, Scotland	new	31,400	Aberdeen Football Club	Future home of Aberdeen	Two out of three stadia out of Easter Road and the new stadia in Aberdeen and Dundee would have been used.
	New Dundee Stadium	Dundee, Scotland	new	31,400	unknown	Future home of Dundee, Dundee United, Scottish Claymores	Two out of three stadia out of Easter Road and the new stadia in Aberdeen and Dundee would have been used.
	Croke Park	Dublin, Ireland	82,300	82,300	Gaelic Athletics Association	Various Gaelic sports matches	Two out of three stadia out of Croke Park, Lansdowne Road and Stadium Ireland would have been used.
	Stadium Ireland	Abbotstown, Castleknock, Ireland	new	80,000	unknown	Future home of Ireland national rugby union team, Republic of Ireland national football team	Two out of three stadia out of Croke Park, Lansdowne Road and Stadium Ireland would have been used.
	Lansdowne Road	Dublin, Ireland	36,000	51,700	Irish Rugby Football Union	Ireland national rugby union team, Republic of Ireland national football team, Leinster Rugby	Two out of three stadia out of Croke Park, Lansdowne Road and Stadium Ireland would have been used.

== Aftermath ==
Commentators and bid officials attempted to seek reasons for why the bid failed. Cited reasons included the issue of having three stadia within the city of Glasgow, the uncertainty over whether Ireland could provide two suitable stadia for the competition, the lack of time between Euro 2008 and the previous major competition hosted in the British Isles, political voting within UEFA, a persevered lack of unity within the Irish Government, the financial visibility of the bid and adverse media coverage within Scotland regarding the bid.

UEFA's President Lennart Johansson and chief executive Gerhard Aigner claimed that the presence of Ireland within the bid and the issue regarding which stadia would be used in Ireland were not factors in the rejection of the bid. Johansson, who wasn't able to vote until the Nordic bid was eliminated from voting, stated that he was shocked that the bid did not progress beyond the first round of voting, insisting that he would have voted for the bid had he been able to vote. He also suggested that FIFA president Sepp Blatter, who defeated Johansson in the 1998 FIFA presidential election, may have had an involvement in ensuring that the Austria–Switzerland bid won.

If that is right, and the Nordic countries and Scotland and Ireland lost because of Blatter, then all I can say is that the world of football is more rotten than I thought. I must look into this. It was a surprise, when I was allowed to come in to vote (after the elimination of the Nordic countries), to find Scotland and Ireland had already been eliminated.

— Lennart Johansson

It was reviled in documents realised by in 2018, that the Scottish Executive's Minister for Tourism, Culture and Sport Mike Watson claimed in a cabinet meeting that the bid was "as good as the winning bid", while suggesting that "the Republic of Ireland was unable to meet their end of the bargain". He told the cabinet that the £500,000 spent by the Executive on the bid was not wasted and useful lessons had been learned from the bid process.

Some of the Scottish media claimed that the Irish Government were being caught up in electoral issues ahead of the 2002 Irish general election held in the May prior to the UEFA vote, which negatively impacted on Ireland's ability to make firm commitments over stadia and funding.

=== UEFA Euro 2016 ===
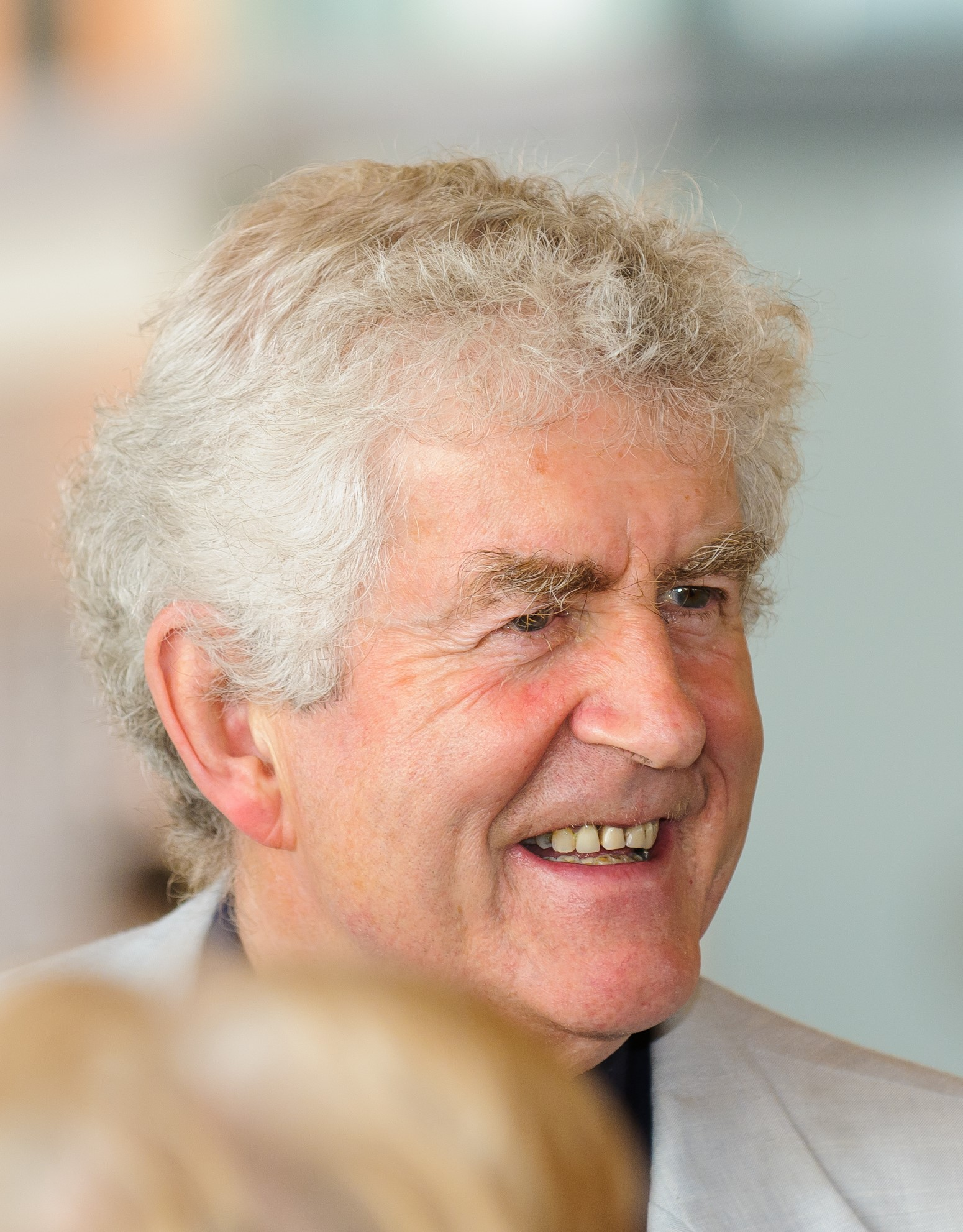
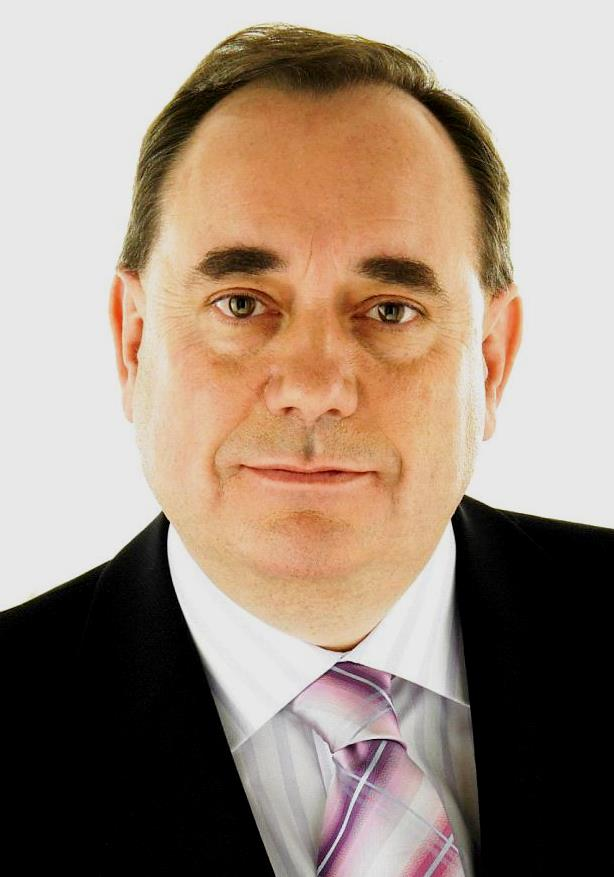
Rhodri Morgan and Alex Salmond were supportive of a joint Wales and Scotland bid to host Euro 2016 in 2008.

On 14 March 2006, UEFA's president Johannsen said that Ireland, Scotland and Wales should consider a three-way bid for UEFA Euro 2016. Later in the month, Scottish FA chief executive David Taylor said that they wouldn't proceed with a three-way bid, but didn't rule out a bid involving Scotland for the tournament. In December 2006, the Football Association of Wales (FAW) announced it was tentatively considering the possibility of jointly hosting the tournament, with the Scottish Football Association. There was discussion over whether Scotland should consider a solo bid for Euro 2016.

The election of a Scottish National Party government, in May 2007, enhanced the chances of a bid for Euro 2016. Comments by Scottish First Minister Alex Salmond suggested that a Scotland–Wales bid may be considered, but a solo Scotland bid would be preferential if logistically possible. In November 2007, Salmond announced that a feasibility study would take place.

In June 2008, both Salmond and Welsh First Minister Rhodri Morgan became supportive of a joint Scotland–Wales bid, particularly when the increase in size of the tournament, from sixteen countries to twenty-four, was announced. The FAW confirmed, that month, that it had held talks with the Scottish FA regarding a joint bid for Euro 2016. FAW secretary David Collins pointed to the new stadia being built in Wales at the time as a reason for Wales to be involved in a bid.

In December 2008, it was reported that Irish Football Association, from Northern Ireland, would be involved in talks, along with the Scottish and Welsh Football Associations over co-hosting the tournament in 2016.

On 1 March 2009, Scotland and Wales officially cancelled their plans to host the competition owing to the economic downturn.

The Scottish FA can confirm that we will not be pursuing a joint bid for the 2016 European Championships. The infrastructure required for the new expanded tournament makes it extremely difficult for us to even consider hosting. Quite apart from the stadia required, the pressure on transport, training camps and accommodation would be massive. We do want to host a major championships here in Scotland but, particularly in these tough economic times, we have to be realistic about the huge costs involved. Our focus for now is on qualifying for the big events in our own right.

— SFA Spokesman

The Welsh Deputy First Minister and Minister for the Economy and Transport Ieuan Wyn Jones stated that the money required to host the event was excessive. "The cost of bringing other venues up to this standard would run into tens of millions of pounds. In the current economic and financial climate, this is unaffordable."

The tournament was ultimately hosted in France, after their bid defeated competition from Italy and Turkey.

=== UEFA Euro 2020 ===
Scotland and Ireland were both involved in a short-lived bid, with Wales, for UEFA Euro 2020. On 15 May 2012, the three countries officially announced their declared an interest in bidding for the tournament. Football Association of Wales chief executive Jonathan Ford said that the declaration of interest doesn't commit the nations to a bid: "It is not a bid, it's a declaration of interest and that will allow us to obtain the information from Uefa so that we can fully assess and determine, independently and together, whether we should submit a bid."

In May 2012, UEFA announced that the competition would be held in multiple stadia across Europe, rather than in a single, or multiple, host countries, opening the possibility of Euro 2020 matches being hosted in the Celtic nations. Ireland proposed that the newly built Aviva Stadium, the replacement of Lansdowne Road, could host matches, while Scotland put forward Hampden Park as a potential venue.

On 19 September 2014, UEFA announced that Dublin, Ireland and Glasgow, Scotland would be host cities for the 2020 European Championships, with the two cities hosting three group games and a round of sixteen match each. Wales, who was initially involved in the Celtic bid for Euro 2020, failed in their bid to bring Euro 2020 matches to Cardiff. The tournament will take place in twelve cities in twelve different countries. However, the UEFA Executive Committee removed Dublin as a host city on 23 April 2021 due to a lack of guarantees regarding spectators caused by the COVID-19 pandemic (with their matches reallocated to Saint Petersburg for the group stage and London for the round of 16).

== See also ==
- UEFA Euro 2028 bids#England, Northern Ireland, Republic of Ireland, Scotland, and Wales
