= National Indoor Arena (disambiguation) =

The National Indoor Arena (previously Barclaycard Arena, currently Utilita Arena Birmingham) is in Birmingham, United Kingdom.

National Indoor Arena may also refer to:

- Scottish National Indoor Arena, later the Commonwealth Arena or Emirates Arena, in Glasgow, United Kingdom
- National Indoor Arena (Ireland)
- National Indoor Arena (Jamaica)
