= Brøndby Stadium =

Football stadium in Denmark

- Vilfort Park "Hell in the North"
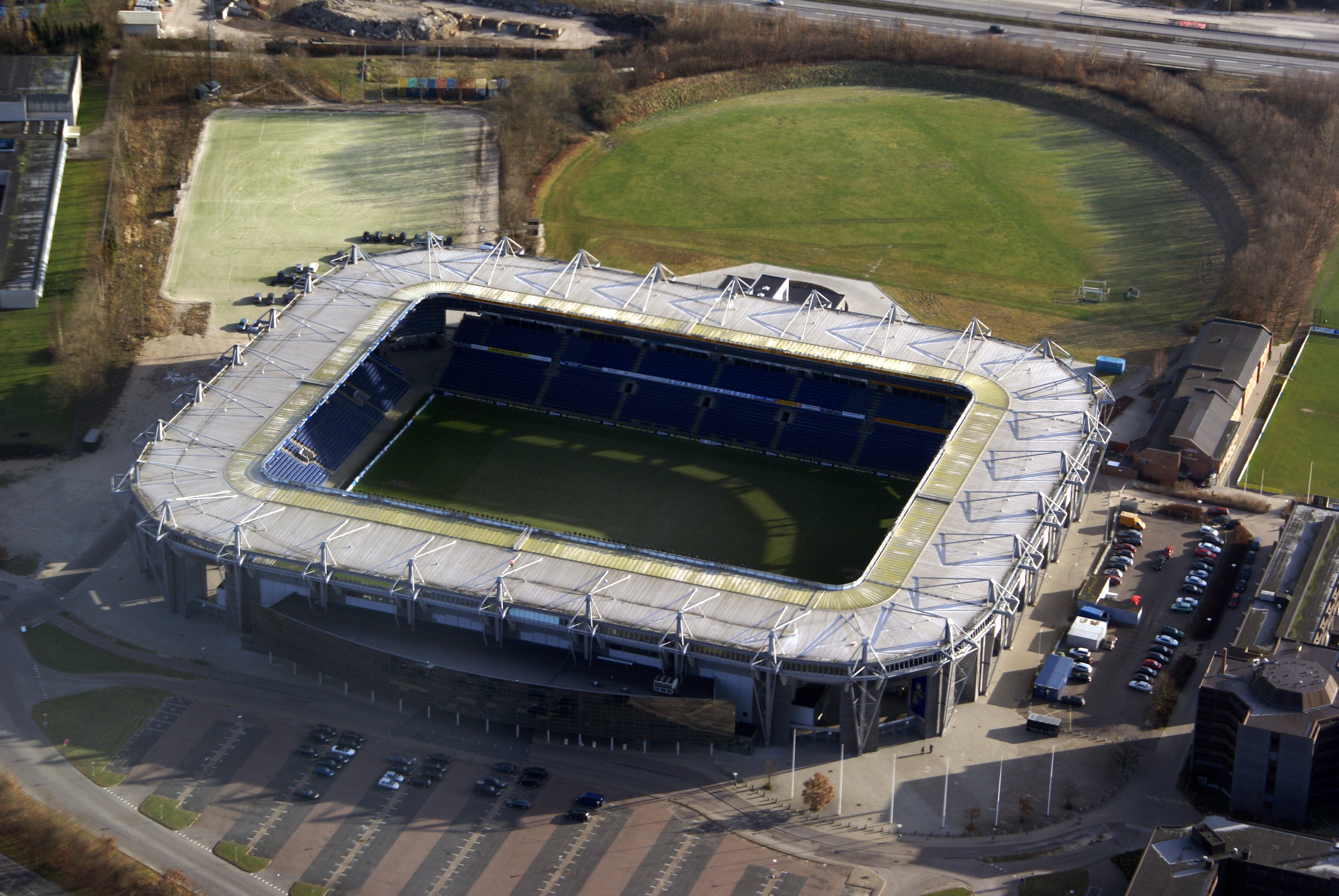
- UEFA
- Interactive map of Brøndby Stadium
- Location: 2605 Brøndbyvester, Brøndby Municipality, Denmark
- Coordinates: 55°38′56″N 12°25′07″E
- Owner: Brøndby IF A/S
- Operator: Brøndby IF
- Capacity: 28,000 (23,400 seats)
- Executive suites: 5
- Surface: GrassMaster hybrid grass
- Record attendance: 31,508 (v. FC Copenhagen; 18 June 2003)
- Field size: 105 m × 68 m (115 yd × 74 yd)
- Public transit: at Glostrup or at Brøndbyøster

Construction
- Built: 1965
- Opened: 31 July 1966
- Renovated: 1999–2000
- Expanded: 1978, 1982, 1989, 1992, 2007
- Architects: KSH Arkitekt & Ingeniør (1999–2000; renovation)

Tenants
- Brøndby IF (1965–); Brøndby Atletik (1965–1991); Denmark national football team (selected matches)

Brøndby Stadium (Danish: Brøndby Stadion, pronounced [ˈpʁɶnpy stɛˈtjʌn]) is a football stadium in Brøndbyvester, Denmark. It is the home ground of the Danish Superliga club Brøndby IF. The venue is the second-largest stadium in Denmark. Built in 1965 and inaugurated on 31 July 1966 where it had no stands, it saw a major redevelopment in 2000 which increased capacity to 31,500 spectators, of which 19,700 were seated. Continuous adjustments to the spectator facilities have since resulted in the stadium having a total capacity of 28,000 spectators, of which 23,400 are seated. Record attendance dates to 18 June 2003, where a crowd of 31,508 were present in a Copenhagen Derby against F.C. Copenhagen.

When hosting the UEFA competitions Champions League and Europa League, seats are installed on the South End terraces (Danish: Sydsiden) in accordance with UEFA regulations, which reduces the total capacity to 26,000.

The stadium has also hosted the Denmark national football team in five matches. Their first game at Brøndby Stadium was a friendly against Portugal on 1 September 2006 which ended in a 4–2 win.

== History ==
=== Turning idea into product ===
The idea of constructing a centrally located, municipal sports facility was presented by erstwhile mayor Jens Christian Jensen in 1945, but at the time the sports clubs of the municipality could not agree on a common stadium.

When a merger of the municipality's three largest sports clubs was considered in the 1950s, much suggests that these plans were fostered on a political as well as executive level. Having only one club in the municipality would enable a more rational use of a future Brøndby Stadium. The idea of a merger gained support in Brøndbyøster Idrætsforening, and at the general assembly in 1962 a majority of the board voted their approval of merging Brøndbyvester Idrætsforening and Brøndby Strands Idrætsforeninger. The latter, however, immediately disapproved of the idea, while a vote in Brøndbyvester ended up with the same result: a 'no' to merging into a municipal superstructure.

Only a few years would pass before plans of merging Brøndbyøster Idrætsforening and Brøndbyvester Idrætsforening would resurface. Financial benefit was one of the main arguments for uniting the two clubs in order to play at a future municipal stadium, and mayor of Brøndby in the period 1966–2005, as well as chairman of Brøndby IF board in 1971–71, Kjeld Rasmussen, has since stated that he and Brøndby's mayor at the time had decided to construct a stadium, provided that the two clubs would merge.

The closer we came to a completion of Brøndby Stadium, the stronger grew the support of forming one big club. Its proponents saw obvious advantages in a merger, which would mean that administrative personnel and athletes would have better physical surroundings to exercise and compete, and finally it would benefit both horizontally and vertically that all energy would become gathered in one club. Eventually, it was suggested that a merger would mean avoiding a reciprocal competitiveness especially in the area of municipal subsidies

— Kjeld Rasmussen, Mayor of Brøndby Municipality, 1966–2005.

On 3 December 1964 in Kirkebjerg Salen in Brøndbyvester, the boards of Brøndbyvester Idrætsforening and Brøndbyøster Idrætsforening adopted an agreement to merge into one club: Brøndbyernes Idrætsforening (Brøndby IF).

=== Construction and early years ===
When the stadium reached its completion in 1965, the ground consisted of nothing more than a grass pitch surrounded by an athletics track and a spectator rail circling the field of play, a training complex featuring four grass pitches, and a gravel pitch. Behind one of the goals various athletics facilities were established, as the club shared the stadium with Brøndby Atletik. In addition, a changing room with four separate compartments was constructed, featuring showers and toilet facilities.

The official inauguration of the pitch was officially planned for late summer 1965, but issues with making the grass grow postponed the launch to 31 July 1966.

In the following years, the area around Brøndby Stadium continuously developed and expanded; in 1969–70 the municipality constructed additional training pitches south of the ground, close to the Holbæk Motorway, and even more training complexes were built south of the motorway in 1972–74.

Conditions around the main playing pitch were also improved; in 1966 two turnstiles were set up at the stadium entrance, and in 1969 a clock was added, courtesy of local watchmaker Bent Henriksen from Brøndbyøster Torv. In 1973 the municipality allocated DKK 20,000 to set up a modern loudspeaker system consisting of four folded horn loudspeakers suspended on four-metre steel trusses.

=== Constructing the stands ===
As Brøndby IF moved up the ranks, a need arose for a more contemporary stadium. In 1975, the municipality allowed the club to improve spectator facilities by installing two-step terraces around the running track. This happened despite the club's wishes to install a covered grandstand.

Only in 1977, when the club reached promotion to the third highest football league in Denmark, the Danish 2nd Division, did the municipality decide that a covered grandstand should be erected. The DKK 4 million project broke ground during the summer of 1978, and in early 1979 the grandstand was ready for use. The stand, which could hold 1,335 seated spectators, and included a speaker booth, media facilities and a TV plateau, was placed facing West towards Gildhøjskolen. Beneath the stand were constructed four dressing rooms, a kiosk, an office, toilet facilities, a storage room as well as the club room of Brøndby Atletik. In the spring of 1980, the municipality installed the first floodlights with a brightness of 4 x 24 kW. With the new stand, spectator capacity increased to 5,000.

As Brøndby IF had reached promotion to the highest football league in Denmark in the fall of 1981, then known as the 1st Division, mayor Kjeld Rasmussen proclaimed that a covered stand would be constructed. Prior to the 1982 season – Brøndby's first on the highest level – concrete terraces were installed opposite the existing grandstand, consisting of 13 rows of terraces the length of the pitch in open air. This allowed a crowd of 5,000 additional people, bringing the total capacity to 10,000.

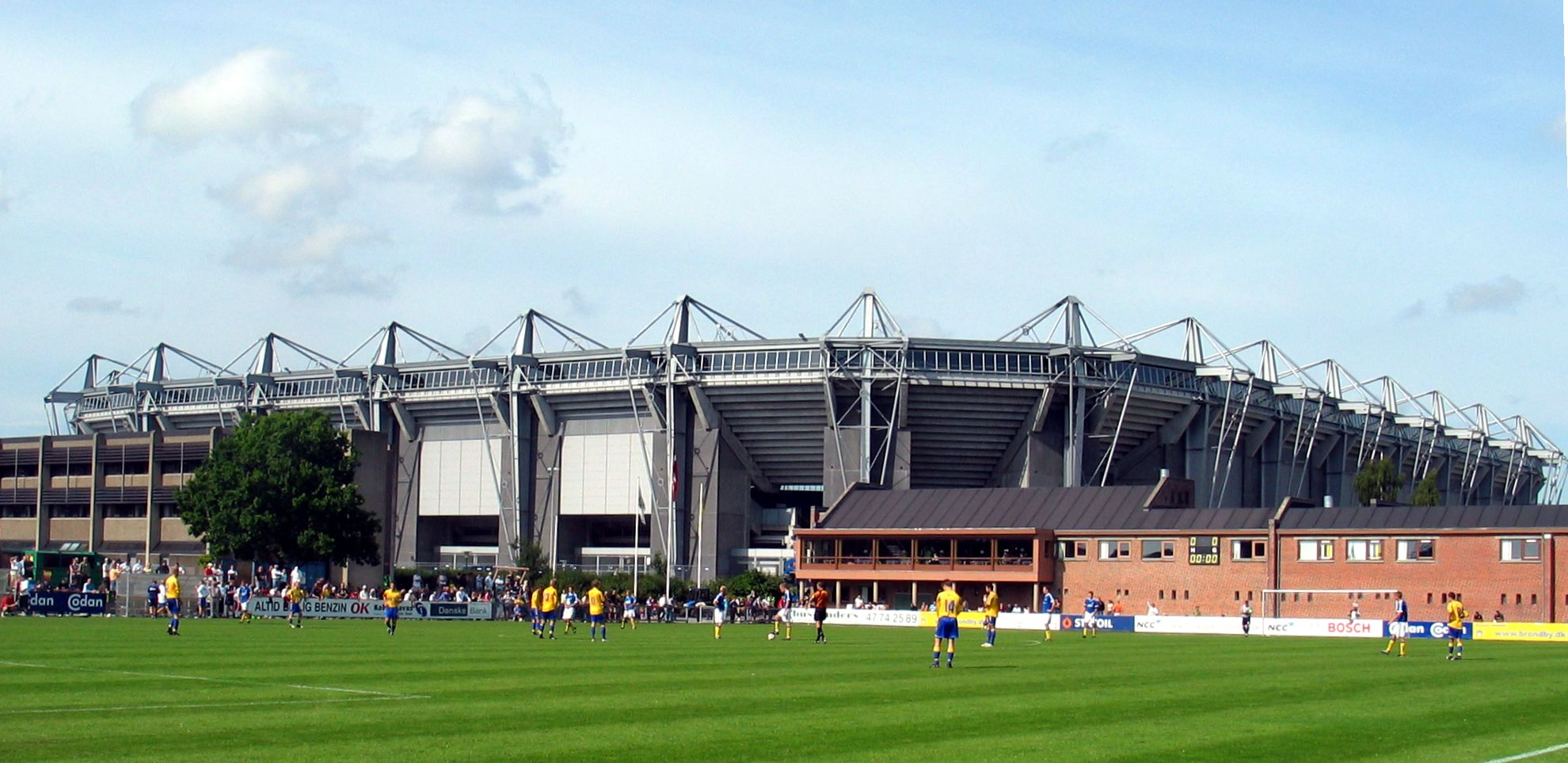
Brøndby Stadium as seen from the south in 2005.

After the club had established itself in the top of Danish football during the 1980s, Brøndby IF reached a hitherto zenith by reaching the quarter-finals of the 1990–91 UEFA Cup. At that time, Brøndby Stadium did not live up to international standards to host matches at that level. However, this was solved by installing temporary end stands of scaffolding, which allowed the club to receive an approval by the UEFA to organise the home leg against Torpedo Moscow. The changes raised the total capacity to 15,000 spectators, and the club even outdid themselves when they reached the semi-finals by increasing the capacity to 17,000–18,000. In the same period Brøndby IF submitted a bid to host the Denmark national football team at a new national stadium; a "Stadion Danmark", which would seat 60,000 spectators and border the Holbæk Motorway. These plans, however, never came to fruition as Parken Stadium won the bid and eventually became the national stadium.

As Brøndby IF gained domestic and European success, spectator interest had grown to such a degree, that it became necessary to move the biggest matches to Københavns Idrætspark. This solution was not deemed satisfactory for neither club, fans nor sponsors, who wanted to remain rooted in the local community. Therefore, the board under leadership of Per Bjerregaard, decided to plan an expansion of Brøndby Stadium. The first step was taken in 1990, when the stand opposite the grandstand was covered and expanded with eight rows, holding 3,500 seated spectators, as well as terracing holding 10,500 standing spectators in total. In the same year the grandstand was expanded with a lounge for sponsors in which a panoramic window allowed for a view of the entire pitch. While Brøndby Municipality had financed the new covered stand, Brøndby IF funded the construction of the sponsors lounge.

Despite improved spectator facilities, the stadium did still not live up to UEFA requirements, and the club wished to erect permanent terracing behind both goals. As this would mean that the running track around the pitch had to be demolished, and that Brøndby Atletik would have to be compensated with a new running track elsewhere, the municipality chose to turn down Brøndby IF's application to further expand the stadium. This made the club consider moving to another city where it would be able to host international games, prompting the municipality to offer Brøndby IF to acquire the stadium and thus raise money to construct an athletics stadium. The club board, spearheaded by Bjerregaard, was, however, only interested in purchasing the area behind the two goals. Brøndby IF had meanwhile offered to pay for construction costs of the end stands themselves, but in order to do so the pitch had to be expanded both in width and length.

In 1991, the municipal council decided that Brøndby IF should have the sole right to use the stadium. Thus, a green light was finally given to turn Brøndby Stadium into a football-specific stadium. In December 1991, the contractor began removing the running track, and in the spring of 1992, the expanded Brøndby Stadium has reached completion: four covered stands with a total capacity of almost 21,000 spectators. This included the infamous terraced "South Side"-end (Danish: Sydsiden) – then known as Faxe Tribunen for sponsorship reasons – which was inaugurated on 29 March 1992. With the 1,335 seats on the main grandstand and another 3,000 new seats on the lower side of the opposite stand, the stadium could hold more than 6,000 seated spectators.

=== 1999–2000 expansion ===
Despite several expansions and improvements over the years, Brøndby Stadium could still not achieve acceptable capacity for international matches, and the club was therefore forced to rent Parken Stadium in Indre Østerbro – home of the national team as well as archrivals FC Copenhagen – for major matches under UEFA. This resulted in losses; both on a financial level, but also in terms of prestige, and because of this the board continued to work on plans of further expanding the stadium.

The first step was commencing negotiations with Brøndby Municipality in order to secure the total acquisition of the stadium, and as a result of the proceedings, Brøndby IF A/S purchased Brøndby Stadium for DKK 23.5 million in May 1998. From this, DKK 16 million was to be deducted for the two end stands and the sponsors lounge, which the club itself had financed, resulting in a final amount of DKK 7.3 million.

The acquisition officially took place on 1 January 1999, after which the largest expansion of Brøndby Stadium could commence; a connected upper stand supported by a total of 32 concrete staircase towers, and a new roof carried by a total of 32 m tall iron structures, each 25 m apart. These would – together with the existing lower stands – ensure that the stadium could bring the total spectator capacity to more than 30,000 for European games and 33,000 to domestic matches. The total costs for the expansion were DKK 270 million, 40 million more than original estimates due to costs spiralling. In addition to the new upper stand section, the main grandstand was expanded with a superstructure. Not least, the sponsor and lounge areas were expanded considerably, and a new three-storey annex providing administrative offices, press facilities, commercial kitchen and lounge areas able to host more than 3,000 was erected facing the parking lot. On the ground floor additional facilities, including a lobby, a gym for the players and a fanshop, were constructed.

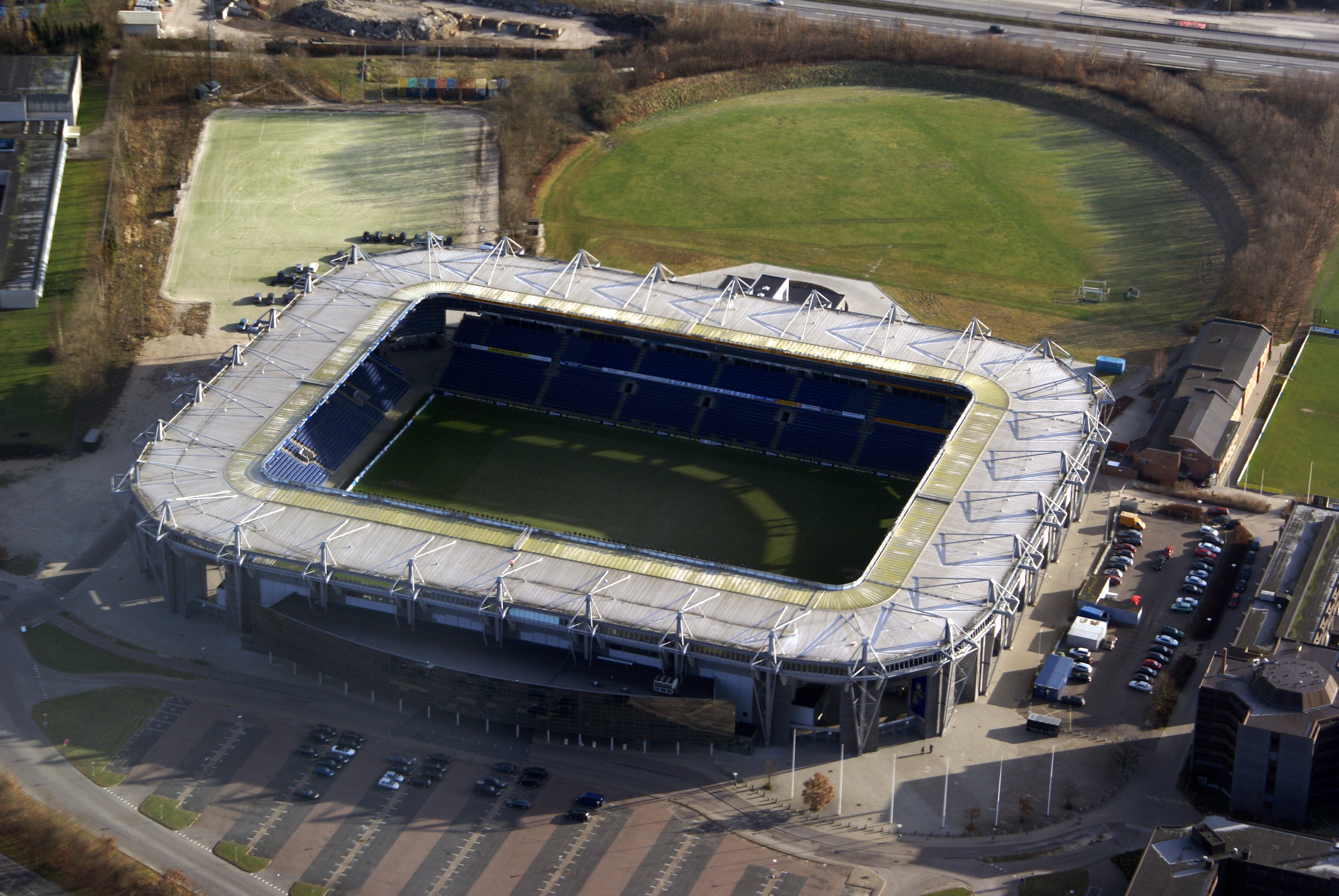
Aerial view of Brøndby Stadium.

The connected upper stands meant that the corners of the stadium became partly enclosed, and toilet stalls as well as food and drink outlets were placed in the spaces between the lower and upper stands. The new upper stands included 13,600 new seats, increasing the total capacity to 31,500 spectators. For international matches, capacity was limited to 26,500 spectators as they demand all-seated crowds. The entire redevelopment progressed while the club still played its home games at the stadium, and the original changing rooms under the main grandstand, originating from 1978, were retained.

The stadium officially reopened with a ceremony on 22 October 2000, followed by an exhibition game between the Brøndby IF team from 1989 and Skagen IK; a rematch mirroring a 1986–87 Danish Cup game, where Skagen from the Danish fifth tier knocked out Brøndby after a penalty-shootout, in what has been described as "the biggest sensation in Danish Cup history". The first competitive game after the rebuild occurred on 22 October 2000 with a 4–2 league win over Akademisk Boldklub in front of 28,416 spectators.

The stadium reached total completion in 2001. The redevelopment also made Brøndby Stadium a part of the Nordic countries' bid for hosting the UEFA Euro 2008, which was eventually awarded to Austria–Switzerland.

=== Additions and improvements ===
Because the total costs of the 1999–2000 expansion exceeded the originally planned budget by DKK 30–40 million, some major and minor additions and improvements to audience facilities were postponed and subsequently carried out over time. First of foremost, the club could not afford new turnstiles, and a planned, highly modern entrance system was only installed in 2003, just as the scoreboards initially did not meet the requirements of the Danish Football Union. The original substitutes' benches in the technical area likewise had to be utilised for some years before being permanently replaced by benches below pitch-level in 2005.

The new blue seats planned for the lower stands would initially have to wait; firstly, the old, worn-out seats were retained on the two original long-side stands, which in the first years following the rebuild appeared as gray, red, yellow and light blue seats. Secondly, seats were expected to be fitted to the extended section of the old grandstand and the lower section of the northern end stand. However, an extra "row 34" was added relatively quickly all the way around the top of the stands, in front of the glass partitions.

As new dark blue seats were installed on the aforementioned areas in 2003, a total seating capacity reached 23,400. This increased total stadium capacity to 29,000, while the stadium could hold crowds of 26,144 for international matches. This was due to the fact that for international fixtures, the South Side-end terracing could be converted into approximately 2,600 seats. Despite many delayed improvements to the stadium, the redevelopment in 2000 already had already secured improved facilities for wheelchair users, as a wheelchair lift had been installed at the southern end of the East Stand.

In 2006–2007, the East Stand (today known as GSV Stand (Danish: GSV-tribunen) for sponsorship reasons) was further expanded at the back with a lounge for sponsors, classrooms for Brøndby Gymnasium (general upper secondary education), a public gym, a production kitchen and the sports bar "1964". In addition, spectator conditions were improved upon with six new multi-stalls and three new staircases beneath the East Stand. Two large LED screens were also installed during this period. The total cost of the project ran up to DKK 90 million.

In 2008, major sponsor Jesper "Kasi-Jesper" Nielsen of KasiGroup financed a decoration of the Brøndby Stadium facade; yellow, illuminated letters with the stadium name affixed between the roof and the top row of seating at three of the stands. In addition, each gable was adorned with four large images that showed Brøndby IF players and fans in different situations.

During the winter break in of the 2017–18 season, the hole on the South Side-end was closed which meant that an additional 75 seats and extra capacity for 150 standing spectators on terracing were added to the stadium. The rebuild was financed by the club's fans, through the official fanclub Brøndby Support and various unofficial fan groups, and through a so-called "fan fund" which arose as a result of season tickets and merchandise sales, among other things. In total, the renovation costs amounted to DKK 450,000, of which the fan fund accounted for DKK 270,000. In the summer of 2018, new 256 LED floodlights were installed, produced in China.

== Structure and facilities ==
The Brøndby Stadium pitch is surrounded by four covered stands, officially known as Sydsiden (South), GSV-tribunen (East), J. Jensen-tribunen (North) and Carlsberg-tribunen (West). Three stands are all-seaters (except the away section on the North End) while the South End is terracing. Each stand has two tiers.

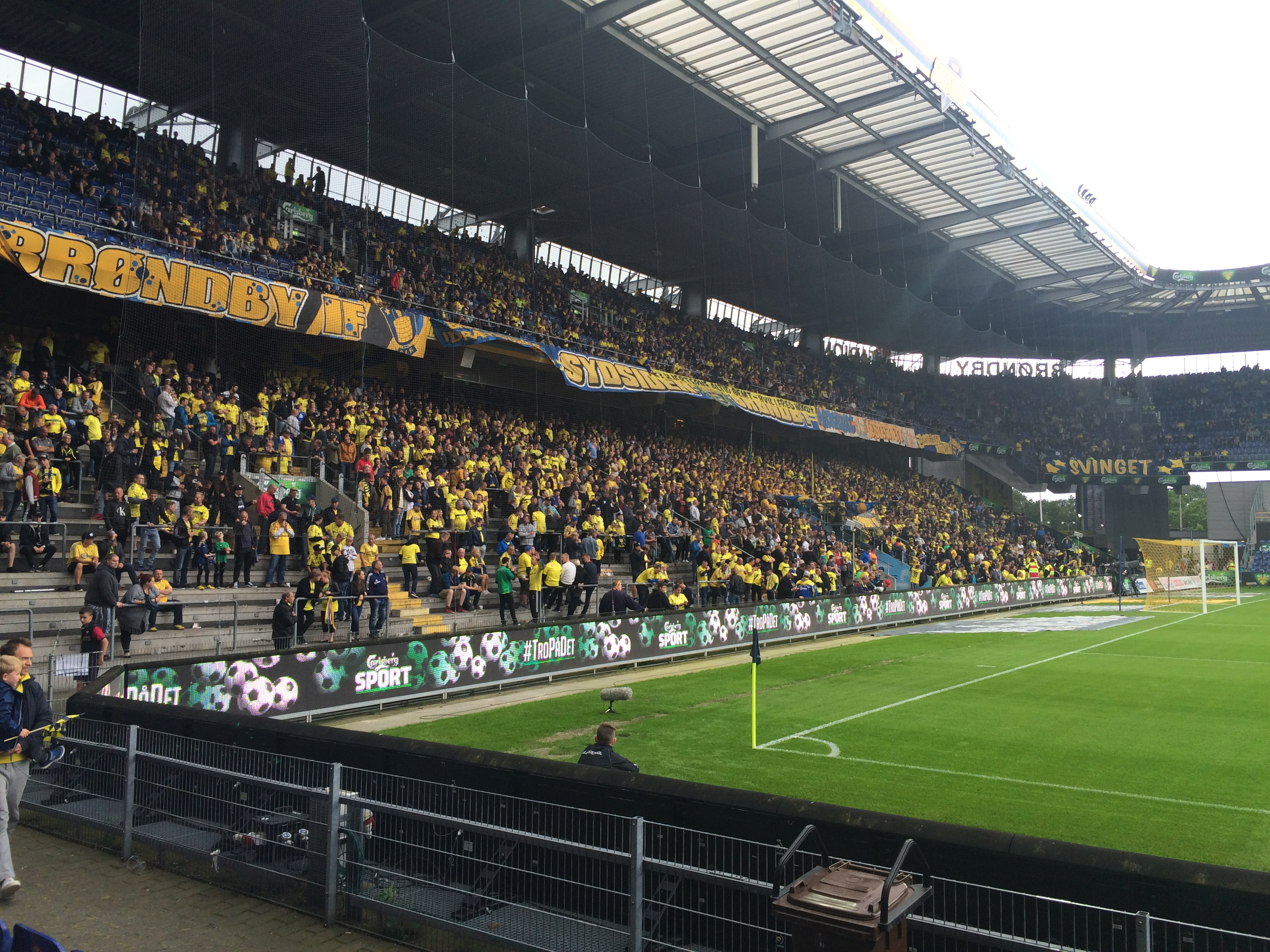
Sydsiden, the former "Faxe Tribunen" during a 4–0 win over Esbjerg fB in July 2016.

=== Sydsiden (South End) ===
Sydsiden, literally "South Side" in English, was inaugurated as the new South Stand on 29 March 1992 in a match against Lyngby Boldklub, due to a rise in interest for Brøndby IF. The lower part of the stand has a standing capacity of 5,600 spectators. Initially, spectators would sit on the terraces, but younger fans would begin encouraging all fans on Sydsiden to stand up, because they thought that it was easier to sing while standing, which would evolve into the mantra "sing or piss off" (Danish: syng eller skrid). This would mark the beginning of a hard-core fan-culture formation on Sydsiden, which has remained ever since, and it is known as the stand in Denmark with the most dedicated and loudest fans when Brøndby plays its home games.

Until 6 March 2011, Sydsiden was known by its sponsor name, "Faxe Tribunen", a subsidiary of Royal Unibrew. This had to change as there was a conflict of interest as Carlsberg moved in as new sponsors. Sydsiden was chosen by a panel representing a broad section of the active fan base at Brøndby Stadium, as fans had called the stand this before. Halfway through the 2017–18 season, the hole in the middle of the stand was partly closed, after continuous requests by fans.

A permanent fanzone was inaugurated outside Sydsiden in 2018 for spectators and fans before, during and after the games. The fanzone is the first of its kind in Scandinavia, and consists of stands for live concerts, bars, foodstands and toilet facilities.

Sydsiden popularised the "Fenerbahçe greeting" in Denmark, imported through the transfer of Brian Steen Nielsen to the Turkish club. A cooperation between goalkeeper Mogens Krogh and Brøndby Support effectually made the greeting get foothold in Denmark.

=== North End ===
The North Stand, now known as "J. Jensen-tribunen" for sponsorship reasons, was originally known as "OBS!-tribunen". The lower section of the stand was constructed in 1992 as terracing, and has among fans been known as "Pølseenden" (Danish: the sausage end) due to its former major sponsor, sausage producer Steff-Houlberg. Fans from the away team are assigned a section on this stand, usually in the eastern part of the North Stand, separated from Brøndby's home fans.

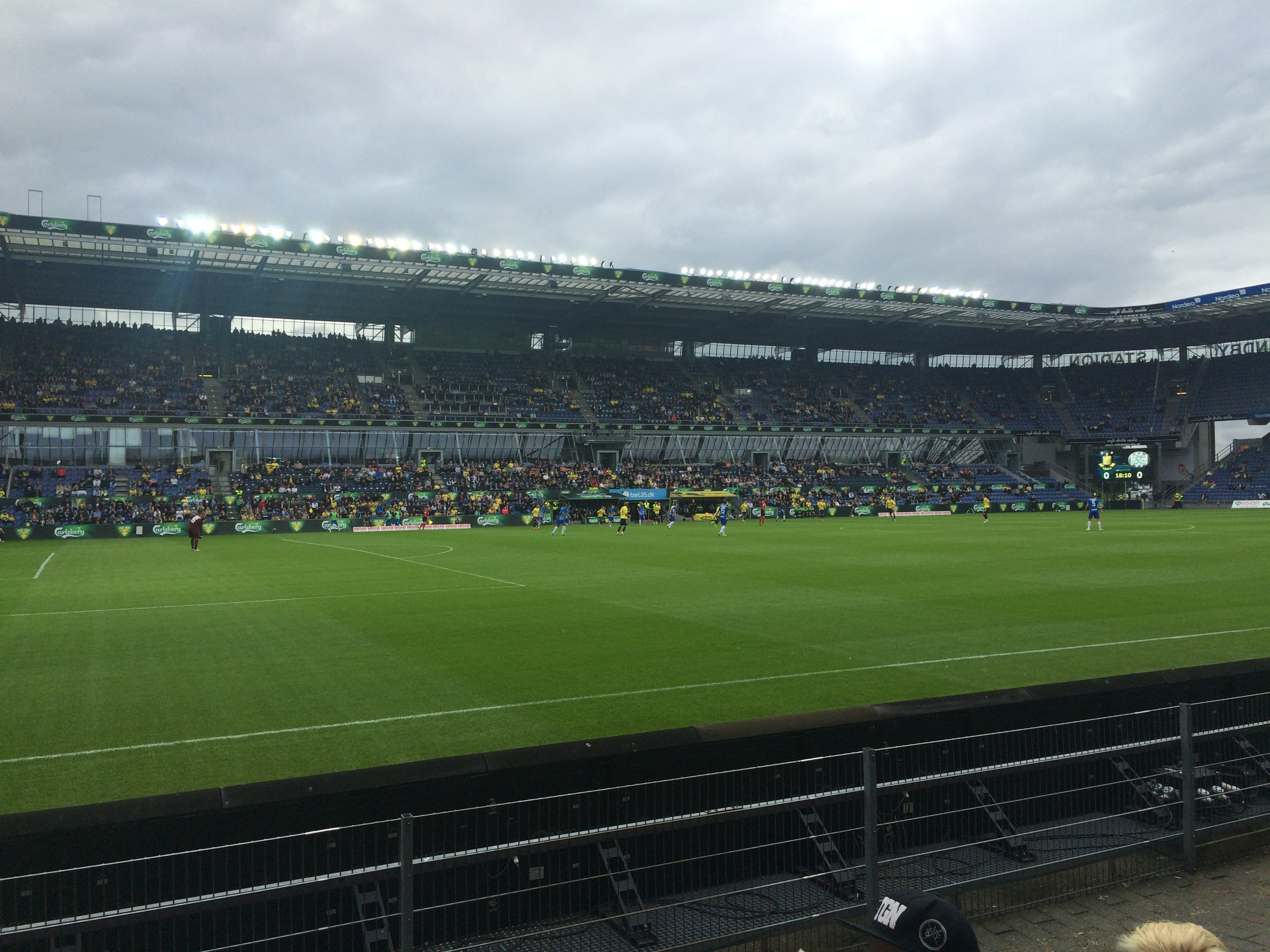
View over the West Stand during a 4–0 win over Esbjerg fB in July 2016.

=== West Stand ===
The West Stand, known as "Carlsberg-tribunen", was originally named "Frisko-tribunen" and later also "SAS-tribunen" and "Apollo-tribunen". The original part of the stand was completed in 1979 as the first stand of the stadium, and it has been preserved through the large expansion in 1999–2000. It can also accommodate some fans in executive boxes and hospitality suites, and is the ground's main grandstand.

=== East Stand ===
The East Stand, now known as "GSV-tribunen" for sponsorship reasons, was formerly called "LOXAM-tribunen", "Codan-tribunen, and "DNE-tribunen". The lower section of the stand was constructed in 1982 and 1990. The East Stand was originally without a roof, and consisted of terraces. Today, it is the largest stand of Brøndby Stadium with a total of 34 rows of seats. In 2006, a larger extension was established behind the stand from the facade, consisting of sponsor facilities, a sports bar and classrooms for Brøndby Gymnasium. The classrooms were inaugurated on 8 January 2007. In April 2018, a new family lounge was opened behind the East Stand with both physical and Esports facilities.

== Pitch and surroundings ==
=== 1964 Park ===
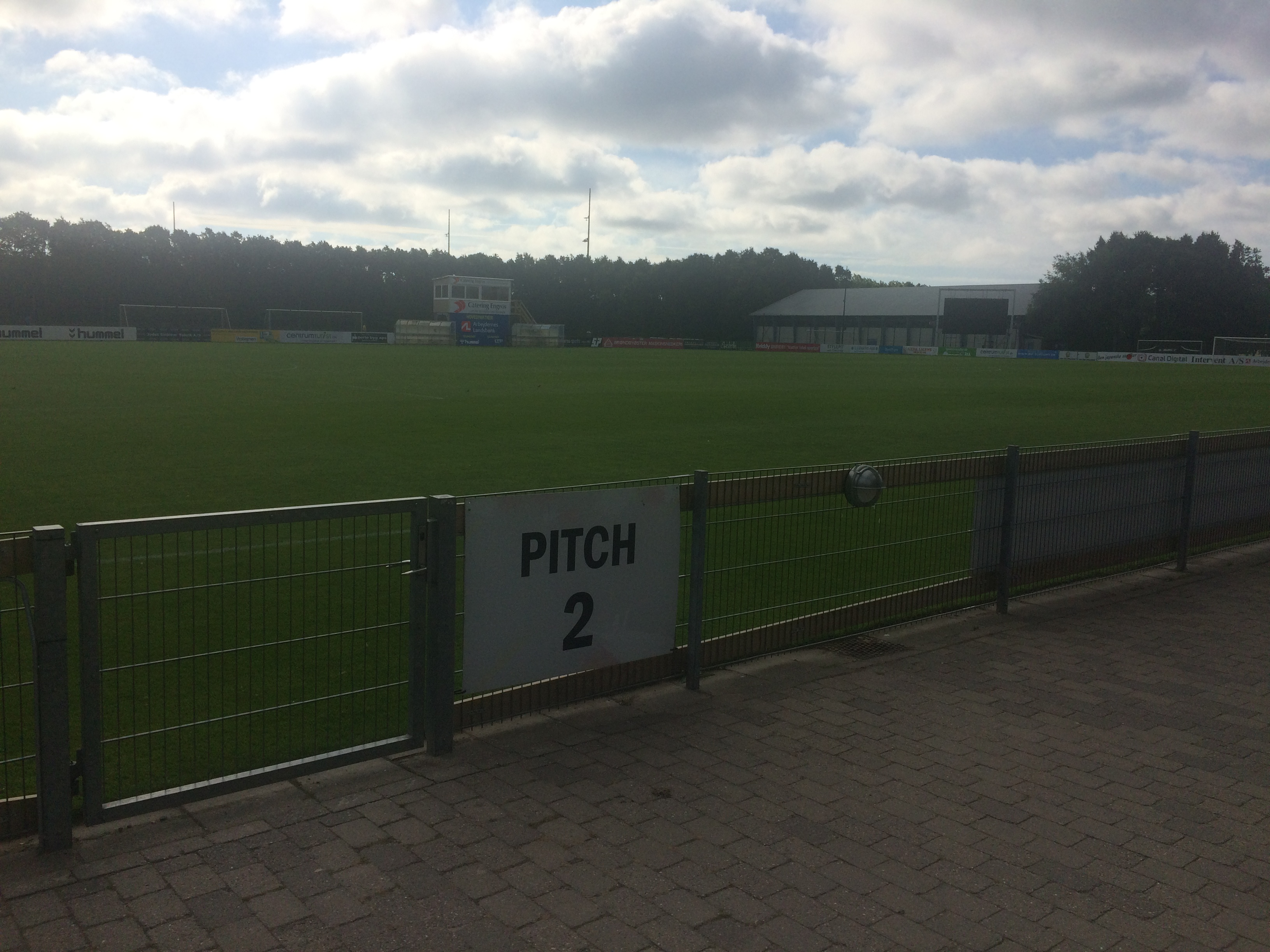
1964 Park pitch.

The east side of the stadium houses the 1964 Park pitch, which serves as the home grounds for the women's team matches in the A-Liga. The pitch is artificial. It is also used as the men's training facility as well as for occasional exhibition games and youth team matches. In 2025, the grounds were renamed from its previous moniker 'Bane 2' to 1964 Park in honour of the founding of the club.

=== The pitch ===
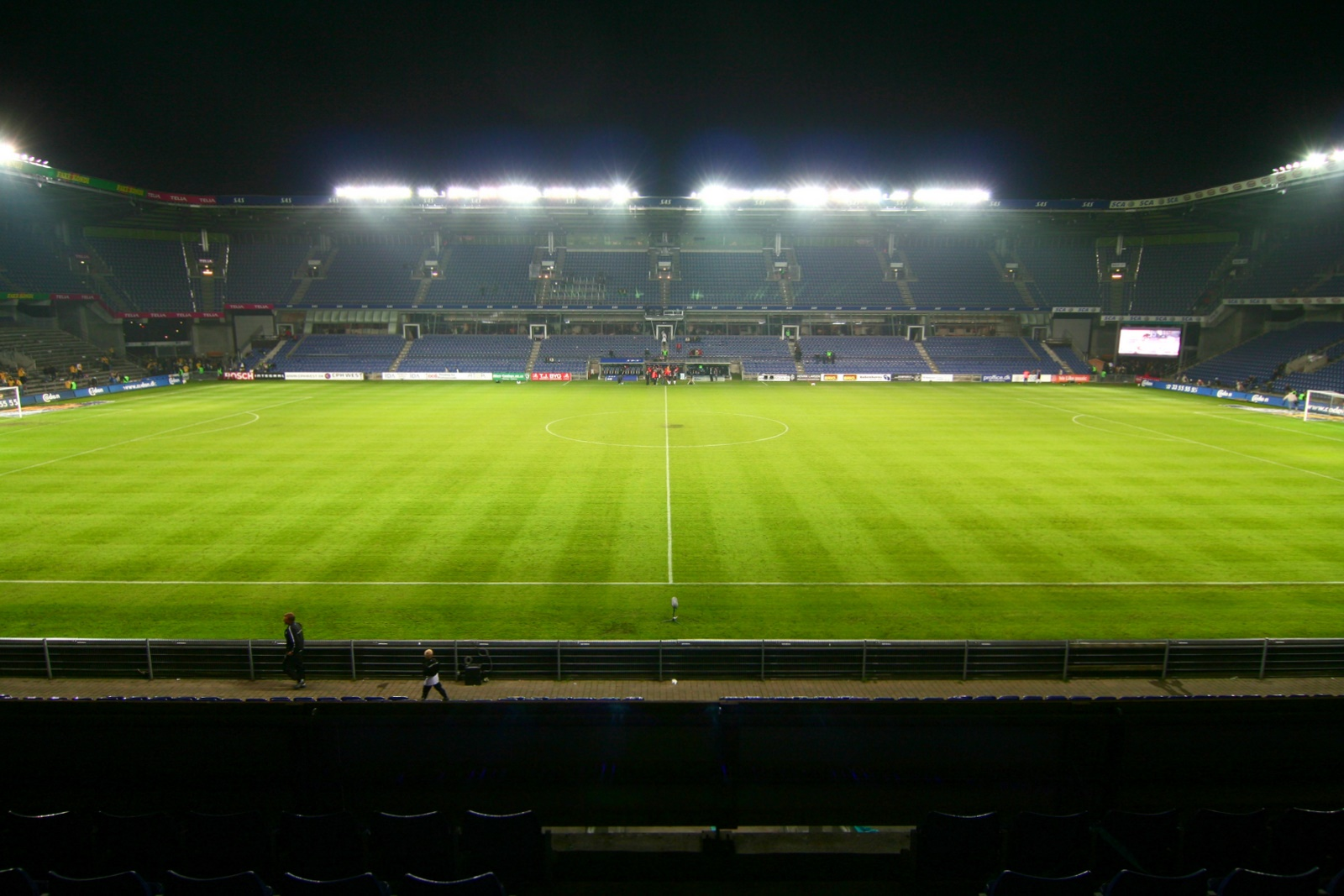
Brøndby Stadium at night-time.

The current pitch measures 105 metres (115 yd) long by 68 metres (74 yd) wide. In 2016, GrassMaster hybrid grass was installed which has become a permanent part of the pitch maintenance, after some issues throughout its tenure.

The original pitch was put into service in 1965. However, it had not been drained properly and as a result the municipality had to ban all use of the pitch until the summer. Due to a lack of proper training grounds in the early years of Brøndby IF, the pitch quickly deteriorated and in 1971 so many divots had appeared that it needed to be relaid.

In 1992, all four stadium stands were erected, which paved the way for an expansion of the pitch that was completed in 1996. On the same occasion, heat pipes and a new, specialised irrigation system were laid under the new grass playing surface. In addition to the improved pitch, new floodlights were installed on the roof of the west and east stands, in order for the lighting to meet the international requirements.

The stadium pitch has been an issue throughout the fall of 2014. That much is clear, and this has been a problem for our brand, image and style of play. Obviously.

— Sporting Director Per Rud in January 2015,

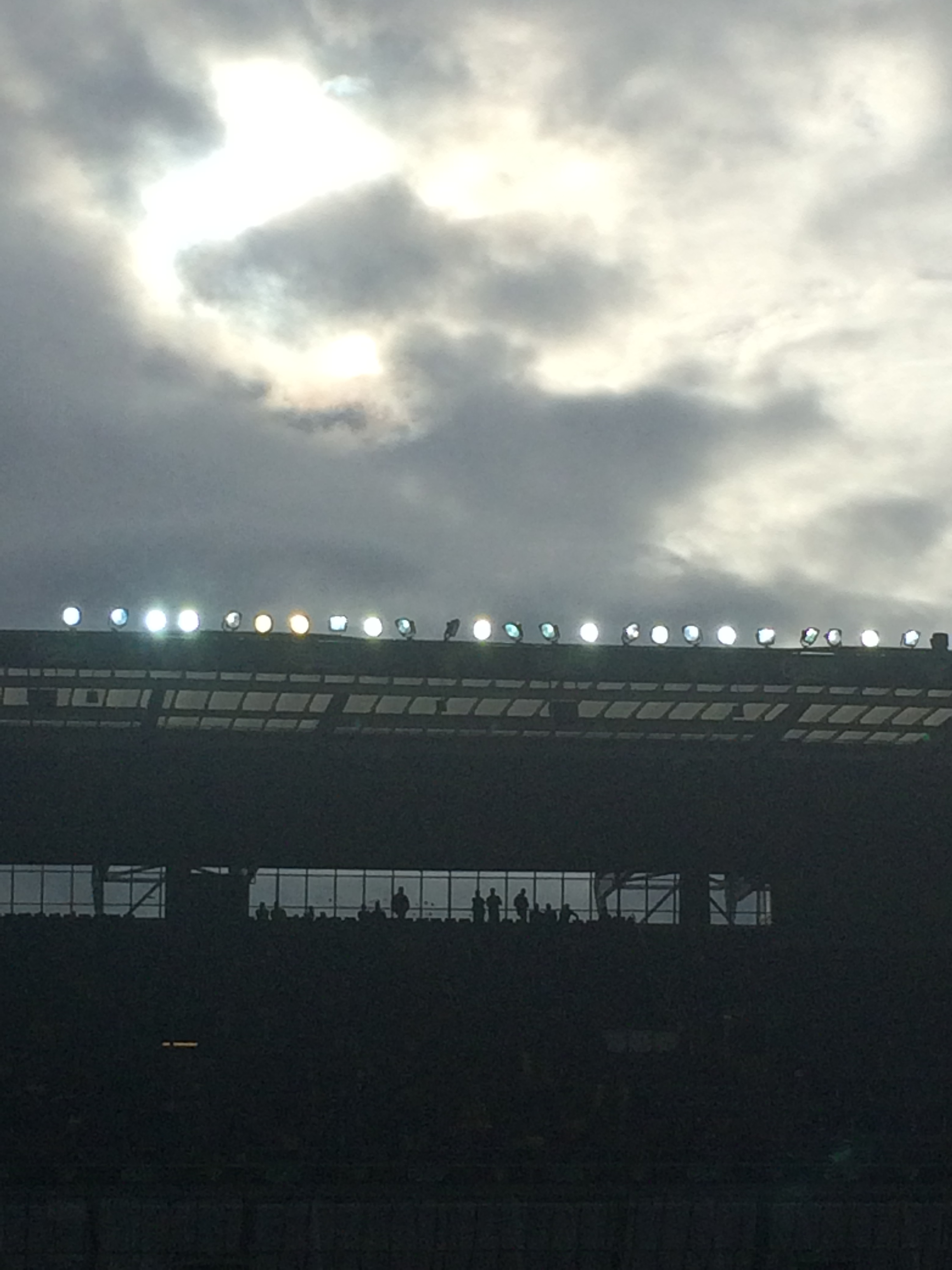
Floodlights at Brøndby Stadium.

There has been some controversy on the pitch throughout the years. In 2015, the grass playing surface had not been replaced since 1997, and was four times as old as the four-year-old green turf at Blue Water Arena in Esbjerg, which at that point made it the second oldest pitch in the Danish Superliga. During the fall of 2014, players and coaches began criticising the playing surface at Brøndby Stadium for its misarable state, which had meant that Brøndby's style of play had to be changed from a focus on technique to a more physical game.

The explanation for the pitch's poor condition was allegedly its age and that Brøndby Municipality had been responsible for maintaining the pitches in and surrounding Brøndby Stadium until the end of 2013. According to Per Rud, however, blame was not to be placed by the municipality, and he stated that there was a difference between operating pitches of regular amateur clubs and professional clubs. At the end of 2014, the club decided to improve the pitch in three phases, where the first phase was to fill the grass playing surface with volcanic ash and setting up carbon dioxide tents to improve growth. The second phase was improving the pitch drainage, in order to guide the water away. The third and final phase was a complete relaying of the pitch. However, the last phase would only happen in 2016, where both the grass surface and the soil under the pitch were changed.

In March 2015, it was revealed that the pitch would still be renovated in the summer of 2015, where access to the drainage and heating pipes were dug, in order for the pitch to drain properly in the future. According to then chairman, Jesper Jørgensen, a grass surface would be installed. On 13 April 2015, Brøndby IF announced that the coming home game would be played on a new grass pitch at Brøndby Stadium, and not as earlier planned after the 2014–15 season. A solution at the cost of DKK 1–2 million with turf from the Netherlands was chosen, which would constitute a temporary pitch before a major renovation was to be completed in October. The new pitch became popular, and the Superliga-captains voted the pitch as the best of the league on 30 May 2017.

== Transportation ==
Rail

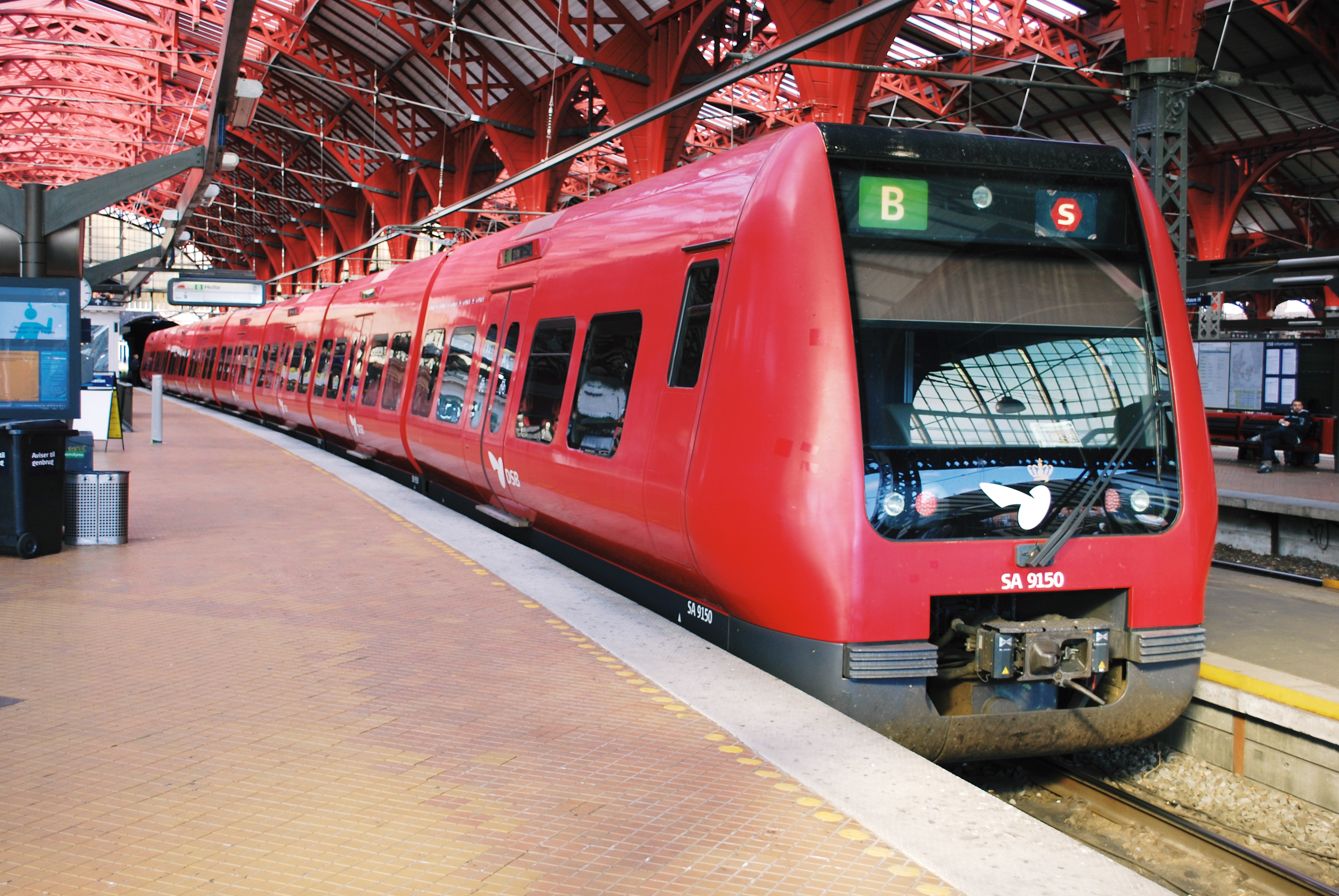
S-train line B

The stadium is accessible via a number of S-train stations. The nearest S-train stations, at around 2.5 and 2.7 km away, respectively, are Glostrup and Brøndbyøster, which are both on the B line (green) from Farum.

- Brøndbyøster. Distance: 2.7 km.
- Glostrup. Distance: 2.5 km.
- Brøndby Strand. Distance: 3.6 km.

Road

Patrons may park their cars in one of the largest free parking facilities of all Danish stadiums, holding 2,500 cars. In addition, 1,000 places are available south of the Holbæk motorway and an additional 700 places north of the Brøndby Rådhus.

Bus

The following bus routes service Brøndby Stadium:

From/to Glostrup:

- 22 Brøndby Rådhus
- 166 Gildhøj Centeret or Brøndbyhallen
- 500S Gildhøj Centeret or Brøndbyhallen

From/to Brøndby Strand:

- 13 Brøndbyhallen or Brøndby Rådhus
- 166 Brøndbyhallen
- 500S Brøndby Hallen

From/to Brøndbyøster:

- 13 Brøndby Rådhus, Gildhøj Centret or Brøndbyhallen
- 22 Brøndby Rådhus

From/to Ørestad:

- 500S Brøndbyhallen or Gildhøj Centret

== Matches ==
Brøndby Stadium has been used seven times as home ground for the Danish national team. Furthermore, it has been the venue of four youth national matches and a Denmark League XI match:

Date		Result		Competition
11 September 1982	Denmark U19	2–0	(West Germany) FRG U19	Friendly
5 May 1984	Denmark U19	0–1	(East Germany) GDR U19	Friendly
19 November 1986	Denmark U17	3–0	Cyprus U17	1987 U16 EUROS qualifying
6 March 2002	Denmark XI	0–1	Norway XI	Friendly
1 September 2006	Denmark	4–2	Portugal	Friendly
19 November 2008	Denmark	0–1	Wales	Friendly
12 August 2009	Denmark	1–2	Chile	Friendly
30 May 2013	Denmark U19	4–1	Germany U19	Friendly
6 June 2017	Denmark	1–1	Germany	Friendly
22 March 2018	Denmark	1–0	Panama	Friendly
9 June 2018	Denmark	2–0	Mexico	Friendly
11 November 2020	Denmark	2–0	Sweden	Friendly
