= Football Association of Ireland =

Governing body of association football in the Republic of Ireland

UEFA
- Founded: 2 September 1921; 105 years ago
- Headquarters: National Sports Campus
- FIFA affiliation: 1923
- UEFA affiliation: 15 June 1954; 72 years ago
- President: Paul Cooke
- Website: www.fai.ie

The Football Association of Ireland (FAI; Irish: Cumann Peile na hÉireann) is the governing body for association football in the Republic of Ireland. It is separate from the Irish Football Association, the governing body for association football in Northern Ireland. The FAI was founded in 1921 and admitted into FIFA in 1923 as the Football Association of the Irish Free State (FAIFS). It readopted the name FAI in 1936. The FAI men's international team has competed as "Irish Free State" (1923–36), "Ireland" (1936–53) and "Republic of Ireland" (since 1953).

== Organisation ==
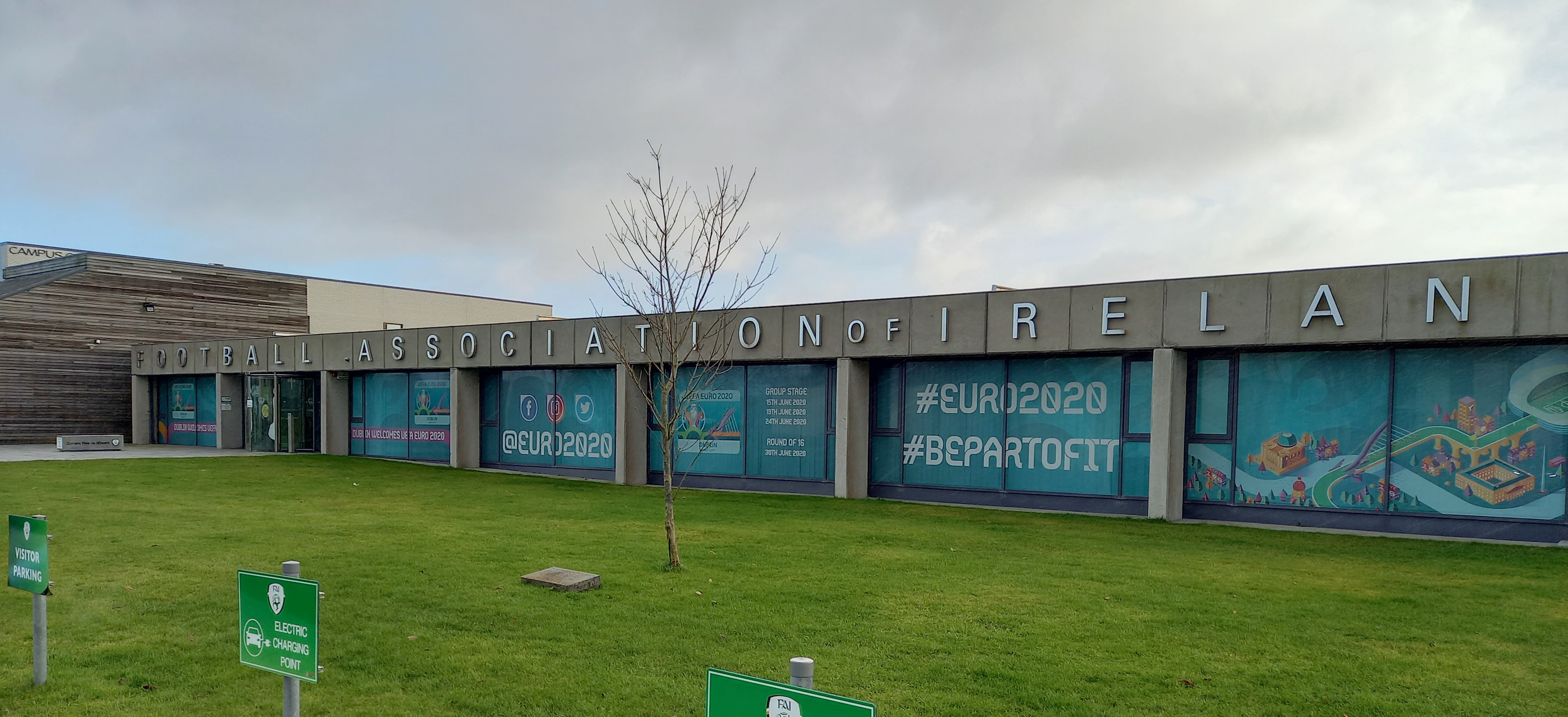
Headquarters of the FAI in the townland of Sheephill

The FAI has an executive committee of five members under the president, who receive expenses, as well as a paid administrative staff led by the general secretary Joe Murphy. There is also a General Council of delegates who vote at the AGM. As well as the senior clubs, the General Council includes delegates from a variety of affiliated organisations:

- Provincial football associations for Leinster, Munster, Connacht and Ulster (representing the three Ulster counties not part of Northern Ireland).
- Separate education associations for primary and secondary schools (FAI Schools), universities (IUFU), and other third-level institutes
- Junior (i.e. non-League) league football
- Women's FAI
- Football for All (amputee football, blind football, cerebral palsy (CP) football, deaf football, homeless street leagues and Powerchair football)
- Referees
- Defence Forces
- The governing body for underage football, up to and including the under-16 age group, the Schoolboys/girls Football Association of Ireland (SFAI)

Recent changes have been made to the organisational structure following the publication of the "Genesis II" report (a non-independent report produced by and for the FAI, following the publication of the independent and highly critical Genesis report) of 2005. This includes the reorganisation of the national football league system in line with the recommendations.

== Activity ==
The League of Ireland actually predated the FAI by three months. The FAI Cup was immediately established along the lines of the FA Cup and Scottish Cup competitions. A second cup competition was formed in 1974 called the League of Ireland Cup. The FAI Junior Cup and FAI Intermediate Cup are for non-League of Ireland teams. The Setanta Cup was inaugurated in 2005 as cross-border competition between FAI clubs from the League of Ireland and IFA clubs from the Irish League. There is also an Under 19 League of Ireland and an under-14 cup competition. The President of Ireland's Cup, a game between the previous season's League of Ireland and FAI Cup winners, was inaugurated in 2014.

The FAI also organises schools competitions, and international teams, including the senior team, underage teams, the amateur team, cerebral palsy (CP) teams and the Olympic team.

The SFAI organises underage competitions such as the Under-16 National Cup.

== History ==
=== Early years ===
In the 19th century, association football outside of Ulster was largely confined to Dublin and a few provincial towns. The British Army teams played a role in the spread of the game to these areas, especially in Munster, as local clubs were initially reliant on them to form opposition teams, leading to the nickname "the garrison game". Association football was played in relatively few Catholic schools; middle-class schools favoured rugby union while others favoured Gaelic games. The Irish Football Association (IFA) had been founded in 1880 in Belfast as the football governing body for the whole of Ireland, which was then a part of the United Kingdom and considered a Home Nation. The Leinster Football Association was an affiliate, founded in 1892 to foster the game in Leinster, outside of the Ulster heartlands. This was followed by the establishment of the Munster Football Association in 1901.

=== Growing tension ===
By 1913, the Leinster FA had become the largest divisional association within the IFA, displacing the North East Ulster FA, yet all but two clubs in the 1913–14 Irish League were based in Ulster. While this largely reflected the balance of footballing strength within Ireland, southern members felt the IFA was doing little to promote the game outside of the professional clubs in its northern province. In the other provinces, association football was also under pressure from the Gaelic Athletic Association (GAA), which had banned members from playing or watching the sport as it was considered a "foreign" game. Furthermore, there was a growing feeling in Dublin of alleged Belfast bias when it came to hosting matches and player selection for internationals. This view was not helped by the composition of the IFA's sub-committees, with over half of the membership consisting of delegates hailing from the North-East, and the International Committee, who chose the national team, containing just one member from Leinster. The Belfast members were mainly unionist, while the Dublin members were largely nationalist. The First World War increased the gulf between the northern teams and the clubs in the south as the Irish League was suspended and replaced by regional leagues, foreshadowing the ultimate split. Tensions were then exacerbated by the Irish War of Independence of 1919–21, which disrupted contact between northern and southern clubs further and prevented resumption of the Irish League. The security situation prompted the IFA to order the March 1920-21 Irish Cup semi-final replay between Glenavon and Shelbourne to be replayed in Belfast, rather than in Dublin as convention dictated. This proved to be the final straw and the Leinster FA confirmed their decision to disaffiliate from the IFA at a meeting on the 8th June 1921.

=== Foundation and split from the IFA ===
The Football Association of Ireland (FAI) was founded in Dublin on 2 September 1921 by the Leinster FA. The Free State League (originally the Football League of Ireland and now the League of Ireland) had been formed in June earlier that year when the Leinster FA withdrew from the IFA. This was the climax of a series of disputes about the alleged Belfast bias of the IFA. Both bodies initially claimed to represent the entire island. The split between Southern Ireland (which became the Irish Free State in December 1922) and Northern Ireland (which came into existence as a jurisdiction in 1921) did not produce a split in the governing bodies of other sports, such as the Irish Rugby Football Union (IRFU). The Munster Football Association, originally dominated by British Army regiments, had fallen into abeyance on the outbreak of the First World War, and was re-established in 1922 with the help of the FAI, to which it affiliated. The Falls League, based in the Falls Road of nationalist West Belfast, affiliated to the FAI, and from there Alton United won the FAI Cup in 1923. However, when the FAI applied to join FIFA in 1923, it was admitted as the FAIFS (Football Association of the Irish Free State) based on a 26-county jurisdiction. (This jurisdiction remains, although Derry City, from Northern Ireland, were given an exemption, by agreement of FIFA and the IFA, to join the League of Ireland in 1985). Attempts at reconciliation followed: at a 1923 meeting, the IFA rejected an FAIFS proposal for it to be an autonomous subsidiary of the FAIFS. A 1924 meeting in Liverpool, brokered by the English FA, almost reached agreement on a federated solution, but the IFA insisted on providing the chairman of the International team selection committee. A 1932 meeting agreed on sharing this role, but foundered when the FAIFS demanded one of the IFA's two places on the International Football Association Board (IFAB). Further efforts to reach agreement were made through a series of conferences between the IFA and FAI from 1973 to 1980 during the height of the Troubles in Northern Ireland.

The IFA did not feel obliged to refrain from selecting Free State players for its international team. The name Football Association of Ireland was readopted by the FAIFS in 1936, in anticipation of the change of the state's name in the pending Constitution of Ireland, and the FAI began to select players from Northern Ireland based on the Constitution's claim to sovereignty there. A number of players played for both the FAI "Ireland" (against FIFA members from mainland Europe) and the IFA "Ireland" (in the British Home Championship, whose members had withdrawn from FIFA in 1920). Shortly after the IFA rejoined FIFA in 1946, the FAI stopped selecting Northern players. The IFA stopped selecting southern players after the FAI complained to FIFA in 1950.

Summary
1880 – IFA founded in Belfast, representing all of Ireland ("Ireland")
1921 – FAI founded in Dublin, representing Southern Ireland ("Irish Free State")
1936 – FAI begins also selecting Northern players ("Ireland"/"Éire")
1946 – FAI stops selecting Northern players ("Republic of Ireland" as of 1954)
1950 – IFA stops selecting Southern players ("Northern Ireland" as of 1954)

Therefore,

IFA (today Northern Ireland) represents all of Ireland between 1880 and 1950
FAI (today Republic of Ireland) represents all of Ireland between 1936 and 1946

At the 1954 FIFA Congress in Lisbon, the IFA requested the international footballing authority to instruct the FAI to refrain from referring to themselves as Ireland in international competition. FIFA decreed that the FAI's teams would be referred to as the Republic of Ireland, while those selected by the IFA would be Northern Ireland.

=== Consolidation ===
From the late 1960s, association football began to achieve more widespread popularity. Donogh O'Malley, TD and then Minister for Education, began a new programme of state-funded schools in 1966, many with association football pitches and teams. The Gaelic Athletic Association's ban on members playing "foreign" games was lifted in 1971. RTÉ television, founded in 1962, and British television (available nearly everywhere on cable or microwave relay from the 1970s), broadcast association football regularly. Above all, the increasing success of the international side from the late 1980s gave increased television exposure, more fans, and more funds to the FAI.

=== Since 1988 ===
However, increased media exposure also highlighted some inadequacies of its hitherto largely amateur organisation.

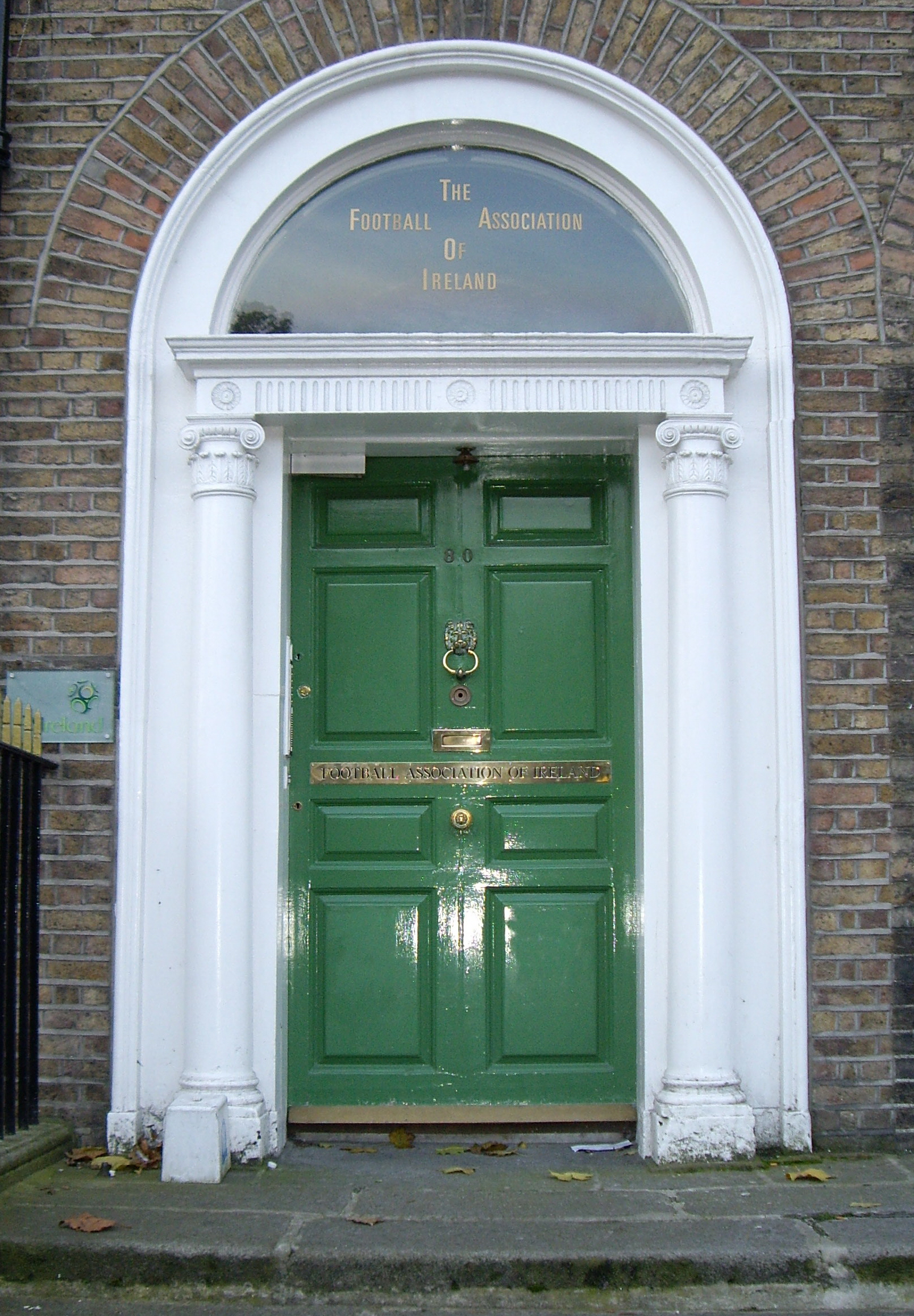
The door of the former FAI offices in Merrion Square, Dublin.

In January 1999, the FAI announced a planned national association football stadium, to be called Eircom Park after primary sponsors Eircom. This was to be a 45,000-seat stadium in City West, modelled on the Gelredome in Arnhem. It gradually became apparent that the initial forecasts of cost and revenue had been very optimistic. FAI and public support for project was also undermined by the announcement of the Stadium Ireland in Abbotstown, which would have 65,000 seats and be available free to the FAI, being funded by the state. The Eircom Park project was finally abandoned in March 2001, amid much rancour within the FAI.

During preparation for the 2002 World Cup, the captain of the senior football team, Roy Keane, left the training camp and returned to his home. He was critical of many aspects of the organisation and preparation of the team for the upcoming games, and public opinion in Ireland was divided. As a result of the incident, the FAI commissioned a report from consultants Genesis into its World Cup preparations. The "Genesis Report" made a number of damning criticisms regarding corruption and cronyism within the association, but was largely ignored. The complete report was never published for legal reasons. The FAI subsequently produced its own report of itself titled "Genesis II" and implemented a number of its recommendations.

In 2002, the FAI announced a deal with British Sky Broadcasting to sell broadcasting rights to Ireland's international matches, as well as domestic association football, to be televised on its satellite subscription service. The general public felt it should be on RTÉ, the free-to-air terrestrial service, in spite of their offering much lower rates. Faced with the prospect of the government legislating to prevent any deal, the FAI agreed to accept an improved, but still lower, offer from RTÉ.

In 2002, the FAI made an unsuccessful bid with the Scottish Football Association to host UEFA Euro 2008.

Following the respectable performance of the national team in the 2002 World Cup, the team's fortunes declined under the management of Mick McCarthy, Brian Kerr and Steve Staunton.

In September 2006, Lars-Christer Olsson, CEO of UEFA, was quoted as anticipating that Lansdowne Road in Dublin (actually owned by the Irish Rugby Football Union) would stage the UEFA Cup Final in 2010, and that the FAI and the IFA would co-host the 2011 UEFA European Under-21 Football Championship. The 2010 final was ultimately awarded to Hamburg, but in January 2009, UEFA named Lansdowne Road as the host stadium for the renamed 2011 UEFA Europa League Final. In August 2010, chief executive John Delaney said the FAI would have repaid all of their stadium debt of €46 million within 10 years despite the disastrous sale of 10-year tickets for premium seats at the Aviva Stadium.

In November 2007 the FAI moved to new headquarters at the Sports Campus Ireland in Abbotstown. Its headquarters since the 1930s had been a Georgian terraced house at 80 Merrion Square, which was sold for a sum variously reported as "in excess of €6m" and "almost €9m".

== Principals ==
The president of the FAI is the highest honorary position in Irish football. The position is nominated and elected by the General Assembly at the association's annual general meeting (AGM) and each term lasts two years. The maximum combined service for the role is eight years. The president chairs the General Assembly meetings, but cannot vote. An exception is made in the event of a tie, in which case the president casts the deciding vote.

The first president was Robert Richey, who was elected on 2 September 1921.

Presidents
| Name | Tenure |
|---|---|
| Oscar Traynor | 1948–1963 |
| Frank Davis | 1976–1978 |
| Charlie Cahill | 1978–1980 |
| Des Casey | 1984–1986 |
| Pat O'Brien | 1986– |
| Michael Hyland | –1994 |
| Louis Kilcoyne | 1994–1996 |
| Pat Quigley | 1996–2000 |
| Milo Corcoran | 2001–2005 |
| David Blood | 2005–2010 |
| Paddy McCaul | 2010–2014 |
| Tony Fitzgerald | 2014–2018 |
| Donal Conway | 2018–2020 |
| Gerry McAnaney | 2020–2023 |
| Paul Cooke | 2023–present |

Sport Ireland and the FAI established a governance review of the organisation on 26 April 2019 to reform the FAI's existing arrangements. One of the recommendations arising from the review was to appoint independent directors to the FAI board led by an independent chairperson. Independent directors are nominated by the FAI's Nominations Committee and ratified by the General Assembly at the association's AGM. Independent directors serve a term of two years.

The first independent chair was Roy Barrett, who was appointed on 8 January 2020.

Independent Chair
| Name | Tenure |
|---|---|
| Roy Barrett | 2020–2023 |
| Tony Keohane | 2023–present |

=== Executive ===
The Executive is the operational and administrative body of the football association and is led by the chief executive. The chief executive of the association is hired by the Board.

Office-holders
| Office | Name | Tenure |
|---|---|---|
| General secretary | Jack Ryder | 1921–1935* |
| General secretary | Joe Wickham | 1936–1968 |
| General secretary | Peadar O'Driscoll | 1968–1988 |
| General secretary | Dr. Tony O'Neill | 1988–1990 |
| General secretary | Sean Connolly | 1990–1996 |
| Chief Executive | Bernard O'Byrne | 1996–2001 |
| Chief Executive | Brendan Menton | 2001–2003 |
| Chief Executive | Fran Rooney | 2003–2004 |
| Chief Executive | John Delaney | 2004–2019 (Note: Delaney was interim CEO from November 2004 to March 2005.) |
| Chief Executive | Multiple acting CEOs (Note: COO Rea Walshe replaced Delaney as CEO on an interim basis, John Foley was due to be appointed CEO but withdrew, vice-president Paul Cooke then became interim CEO before he was succeeded by Gary Owens who held the role until Hill's appointment.) | 2019–2020 |
| Chief Executive | Jonathan Hill | 2020–2024 |
| Chief Executive | David Courell | 2024–present |

*First full-time secretary since 1928, Ryder died in November 1935

== Management structure ==
The association's governance structure is divided into three sections: the General Assembly (previously known as the FAI Council), the Board of Management and Committees, and the FAI Administration Staff.

The FAI's administration staff are based in the association's headquarters in Abbotstown, Dublin and handle the day-to-day running of the association.

The FAI Council is made up of 60 members from across Irish football. The Council elects the FAI's president, a number of committee members and also pass major decisions. The Board of Management has ten members: the president, vice-president, honorary secretary, honorary treasurer, chief executive, and the six chairpersons of the Development (International, Domestic, League of Ireland, Legal/Corporate & Underage committees). The Finance committee is represented by the Honorary Treasurer rather than selecting a chairperson. A number of committee members elected by Council and a further number selected by the CEO, President and Council Representative (other than an officer). For balance within the committees, the person selected cannot be from the same affiliate as the person elected by council, while no one person can sit on more than two committees. The Chief Executive also sits as a voting member on the Finance and Legal and Corporate Affairs Committees.

Board of Management
| Office | Name |
|---|---|
| President | Tony Fitzgerald |
| Vice President | Donal Conway |
| Honorary Secretary | Michael Cody |
| Honorary Treasurer | Eddie Murray |
| Chief Executive | Vacant |
| Chair of International Development | Milo Corcoran |
| Chair of Domestic Development | Jim McConnell |
| Chair of League of Ireland | Eamon Naughton |
| Chair of Legal/Corporate | Paraic Treanor |
| Chair of Underage committees | |

== Controversies ==
The FAI has been involved in a number of scandals and controversies during its existence.

=== 1990s (Merriongate) ===
For the 1990 and 1994 World Cups, the FAI had sought to acquire additional tickets for the national team's matches by exchanging them for tickets it had been allocated for other games. These exchanges were not only conducted with other football associations, but also exchanged with ticket touts. It later emerged that the FAI's honorary treasurer Joe Delaney, father of John Delaney, had engaged in the deals without the knowledge of the FAI executive. As a result, the FAI was left with many unsold tickets and incurred heavy losses from these transactions. The "Merriongate" controversy, so called after the FAI's then-headquarters in Merrion Square, broke in 1996 when the media reported on the events.

==== Night of the Long Knives ====
The fallout of the Merriongate scandal led to a meeting of the FAI Council, later known as the FAI General Assembly, on 8 March 1996 to determine responsibility. Treasurer Joe Delaney was removed from his position after losing a vote of no confidence and was joined by President Louis Kilcoyne and General Secretary Sean Connolly. Due to the removal of multiple senior FAI officials at once, the event was compared to the Night of the Long Knives by the media.

=== 2000s ===
The 2007 season saw the FAI start a five-year term of running the League of Ireland after merging with the League. There was controversy over the manner in which clubs were allocated between the two divisions of the new League, as simple promotion and relegation from the previous season's leagues was not used, but rather a weighting of results, infrastructure and finances.

==== Vantage Club ====
While the Aviva Stadium was being built, the FAI issued a debenture ticket scheme for stadium seats, called the Vantage Club, to help fund the association's €74M share of the renovation costs. At the scheme's launch in September 2008, the FAI's CEO John Delaney estimated that the association needed to sell 60 per cent of the 10,400 premium seats — roughly 6,300 – to break even. The 10-year tickets would cover all international football games over the following decade and were initially priced between €12,000 and €32,000.

After the country's recession, price reductions were rejected in favour of monthly direct debits that totalled €1,200 to €3,200 per year and, by September 2010, a report in the Irish Independent newspaper found that just over 4,000 seats had been 'allocated'. The figure of allocated seats included tickets which were not being paid for. The FAI claimed the actual allocated ticket figure was 6,300 but did not confirm the number of tickets sold.

Reports emerged of the FAI lobbying football clubs to purchase tickets, with the clubs under the impression that if they didn't buy a premium ticket they wouldn't get FAI funding. By 2015, the 10-year ticket prices had dropped to €5,000. Conversely, the FAI's funding partners in the stadium rebuild – the Irish Rugby Football Union (IRFU) – sold all of their 10-year premium seats before the 2007 Rugby World Cup at a set price of €15,000. The FAI's failure to recoup the cost of their borrowings for the stadium left the association with large debts to manage and a shortage of cash.

==== Barcelona friendly ====
In 2010 the FAI refused to sanction a high-profile friendly between Limerick F.C. and FC Barcelona in Thomond Park, at first citing a clash of fixtures, despite none of the games involving Limerick. It was later revealed that the reason for the refusal to sanction was due to an agreement the Association had in place whereby any game with a capacity of more than 20,000 had to be agreed with by a third-party, and that the FAI was in discussions about organising their own friendly with Barcelona (which the Catalan giants later refuted). When asked if Limerick could hold the friendly if they agreed to cap the attendance at 19,990, the FAI then informed the press that the limit in the contract was in fact 15,000. This apparent back-tracking, combined with abject media performances by John Delaney and Fran Gavin when attempting to justify the FAI decision, was seen as a further slap in the face for the League of Ireland, many of whose clubs were in serious financial danger.

Shortly before this scandal, the FAI announced the first association football game to take place in the Aviva Stadium was to be between Manchester United and a League of Ireland XI. When the announcement was made, it was mentioned that this game would potentially clash with a Bohemians Champions League qualifier, should the club progress. The FAI responded by announcing negotiations with UEFA about a fixture change, which contradicted its decision not to grant the Limerick game due to a fixture clash with other Irish clubs. It was also noted that the game was set up directly by the FAI and not the supposed third-party, despite the attendance being over 15,000. The game itself was seen as a humiliation for the League of Ireland, as the FAI looked to have turned their back once again on Irish clubs in order to accommodate Premier League fans.

After the Aviva Stadium curtain-raiser, the FAI announced that they had debts of €38 million, and had only sold 6,300 Vantage Club tickets from a projected 10,000. This was at a time when the Chief Executive, John Delaney, earned €430,000, double what 2010 League of Ireland Champions received in prize money. The figure of 6,300 was later questioned by an Irish Independent report which suggested in fact only 4,077 tickets had been sold, with as many as 1,000 of those 4,077 have been allocated to 10-year ticket holders, mainly taken by financial institutions who have not paid for the tickets since the project began.

=== Finances 2016 - 2020 ===
==== Bridging loan ====
FAI Chief Executive John Delaney confirmed he gave the association a €100,000 loan to help it through what he said was a short-term cash flow problem. In a statement on behalf of Mr Delaney, the FAI said the "bridging loan" was given in April 2017 and repaid in full to Mr Delaney in June of that year. In a second statement issued by the FAI, Mr Delaney expanded on his comments. He said he acted in the best interests of the Association, at a time, he said, when immediate funding was needed. He described the loan as "a matter of timing," adding the loan had no impact on the full financial position or performance of the FAI for the year. In April 2019, John Delaney appeared before the Oireachtas Committee on Tourism, Transport and Sport, stating he was precluded from making any further comments at this hearing in relation to the finances of the Association or his former role as CEO or the €100,000 loan. The chairman of the Leinster Senior League then called for a change in how Irish football was run, revealing that a large number of the leading amateur league's clubs were "not confident in the direction the FAI board is taking". David Moran told RTÉ Sport that the LSL committee had written to its 138 member clubs asking whether the Association's board should resign in the wake of revelations over a €100,000 loan from former FAI chief executive John Delaney to his employers.

==== Hidden losses ====
Accounts for 2016 and 2017 were amended in December 2019, replacing reported profits with losses.

With liquidation of the association a possibility, the men's national team's participation in the Euro 2020 play-offs was under threat due to the funding crisis.

The FAI's CEO changed four times between 2019 and January 2020. Delaney resigned from the post in September 2019, with Gary Owens, former CEO of IFG Group, appointed to replace him the following January and former International and former chairman of Sunderland F.C., Niall Quinn, appointed as interim deputy CEO, choosing to go without salary until the financial future of the organisation could be secured. In January 2020, former board member Gerry McAnaney replaced Donal Conway as president.

== See also ==
- FAI International Football Awards
