= Eircom Park =

Proposed football stadium in Saggart, Dublin

Eircom Park was a proposed association football stadium in Saggart, Dublin, intended to be the home of the Republic of Ireland national football team. The planned 45,000-seater stadium was to be named after the national team's sponsor, Eircom. Plans for Eircom Park were first announced in January 1999, when the Republic of Ireland were playing home games at Lansdowne Road, owned by the IRFU at the time. The plans were criticised for being unrealistic, not least the FAI's intention to host 57 non-sporting events at the stadium each year.

By January 2001, the projected costs of the project had doubled, and all plans for Eircom Park were subsequently abandoned. The FAI instead gave its support to the government-backed Stadium Ireland project. However, as plans for Stadium Ireland fell through by September 2002, it was instead decided to redevelop Lansdowne Road into the Aviva Stadium, which opened in 2010.
