= National Sports Centre =

National Sports Centre may refer to:

- National Sports Centres, multiple centres in England
- National Sports Centre, in Kamëz, Tiranë, Albania
- National Sports Centre, in Devonshire Parish, Bermuda
- National Sports Centre, in Douglas, Isle of Man

== See also ==
- Crystal Palace National Sports Centre
- National Olympic Sports Centre
- National Sports Campus
- National Sports Centre Papendal
- National Sports Center, United States
- National Sports Stadium (disambiguation)
