= National Sports Stadium =

National Sports Stadium can refer to:

- National Sports Stadium (Mongolia)
- National Sports Stadium (Zimbabwe)

== See also ==
- National sport
- National Sports Center, United States
- National Sports Centre (disambiguation)
- National Sports Complex, Malaysia
- Olimpiyskiy National Sports Complex, Ukraine
- List of national stadiums
