= Stadium Ireland =

Proposed stadium in Dublin, Ireland

Stadium Ireland (commonly referred as the "Bertie Bowl") was a proposed sports stadium in Abbotstown, Dublin, Ireland. Its nickname was due to its close association with the then Taoiseach, Bertie Ahern. If it had been built as proposed, the stadium would have served as Ireland's national stadium and hosted home games for both the national football team and national rugby union team.

The government-built stadium was planned to hold 75,000, and was central to Ireland's joint (and ultimately unsuccessful) bid with the Scottish Football Association to host UEFA Euro 2008. The Stadium Ireland project was abandoned by September 2002 because of spiraling costs and waning support. Government backing was instead given to the redevelopment of Lansdowne Road into the Aviva Stadium, which officially opened in May 2010.

Ahern remarked in April 2020 that the "Bertie Bowl" could still be built if someone had the "political guts".

== See also ==
- Eircom Park
- National Sports Campus
