= National Aquatic Centre (Ireland) =

Indoor aquatics facility, Dublin, Ireland

Sport Ireland National Aquatic Centre
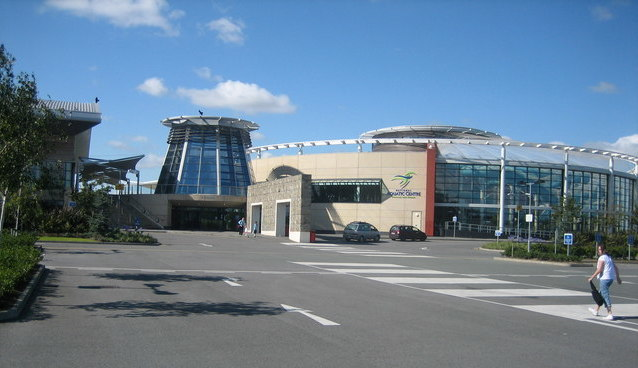
- Entrance to the National Aquatic Centre

- Location within Dublin
- Location: Sport Ireland Campus, Blanchardstown, Dublin
- Coordinates: 53.397°N 6.37°W
- Operator: Sport Ireland
- Capacity: 2,500

Construction
- Groundbreaking: 2002
- Built: 2002–2003
- Opened: 10 March 2003; 23 years ago
- Cost: €70 million
- Architects: S & P Architects
- General contractor: Rohcon

Tenants
- 2003 Special Olympics World Summer Games; 2003 European Short Course Swimming Championships

The Sport Ireland National Aquatic Centre (NAC) (Irish: Ionad Náisiúnta Uisce) is an indoor aquatics facility in Blanchardstown, County Dublin, Ireland. The State-owned complex houses a 50-metre swimming pool with an associated diving pool, an aquapark and leisure pool, and a fitness centre.

Since opening in March 2003, the centre has hosted the swimming events of the 2003 Special Olympics World Summer Games, the 2003 European Short Course Swimming Championships and a number of international water polo events. It also hosts the Irish Open Swimming Championships, Irish Senior Water Polo Cup, and Irish Open Diving Championships, as well as a number of other national and regional aquatic events.

== History ==
In 2001, a "Design, Build and Operate" contract for the centre was awarded to a consortium of companies – S & P Architects (for the design part), Rohcon (construction) and Dublin Waterworld (operation). The capital cost of the centre was originally budgeted at €62.5 million. The project was certified as complete in September 2010. The actual cost of the project is still unclear but, as of 2013, €119m had been spent on the campus.

The centre sustained roof damage during a period of stormy weather in January 2005 and had to be closed for five months so that repairs could be carried out. This closure, after only 18 months of operation, damaged the business of the operating company, Dublin Waterworld. Campus & Stadium Ireland Development (CSID), the State company which owns the centre, commissioned an engineer to assess the roof damage and they concluded that the roof was not designed and constructed in accordance with building regulations, despite the fact that CSID's experts had certified it. During the period of closure, the National Sports Campus Development Authority (NSCDA) commenced legal proceedings to remove the operators. The case was settled in December 2006 with Dublin Waterworld agreeing to leave the centre and each party covering their own costs.

NSCDA stated that the former Operator Dublin Waterworld Limited had failed to pay VAT of some €10m. A High Court-appointed arbitrator upheld the VAT charge as did the High Court. However, in 2010 the Supreme Court ruled that there was no basis for the VAT charge and set aside both the earlier awards. The Public Accounts Committee investigated the background of the case and issued a report in May 2012, which was highly critical of NSCDA and the Department of Sport. In December 2012, Dublin Waterworld acquired documents that demonstrated that NSCDA had been advised in 2002 that the VAT charge was contrary to legislation. These documents were forwarded to the Public Accounts Committee, and an explanation from NSCDA was sought.

From the time when the NSCDA took back the running of the centre in 2007 until 2013, the centre saw visitor numbers multiply, and membership triple, but it still required a multi-million euro annual subsidy. The centre's operators stated that the centre had over six hundred thousand visitors in 2011, with admission income of €1.4m and ticket costs of up to €14. In 2012 over 815,000 people used the facilities of the centre, making it Ireland's third most popular fee-paying attraction.

Swim Ireland launched a High Performance Unit in April 2010 and conducts training camps for elite swimmers at the centre. In 2012, the NAC hosted pre-Olympic training camps for teams from 16 different countries, including the then Water Polo Champions Hungary, the new Olympic Water Polo Champions Croatia, the Korean National Swimming team and the Synchronised Swimming team from the US, among others.

The NAC has come to house Ireland's biggest one-site programme of swimming lessons (over 2,500 participants weekly) and has over 4,500 members.

== Facilities ==
The National Aquatic Centre is one of the world's largest indoor water centres. It comprises:

- a 10-lane 50-metre x 25-metre international-standard swimming pool with two moveable floors which allow it to be reconfigured for other uses;
- a 25-metre international standard diving and warm-up pool;
- seating for 2,500 spectators;
- a leisure area (AquaZone) including adventure water rides, with a children's play pool and wave pool, and a "lazy river" feature;
- a fitness centre (ToneZone);
- a café.

The centre is fully accessible and was commended in 6 O2 Kanchi Award categories as well as winning ILAM Gold Standard awards twice.

=== Olympic-standard swimming pool ===
The National Aquatic Centre houses Ireland's first Olympic standard pool. Known as the International Competition Pool, in 2003 it was used for the 2003 Special Olympics and later in the same year hosted the Ligue européenne de natation. In 2012, this pool hosted nations from across the globe, including teams from the USA, Great Britain, South Korea, Canada, Croatia and more for pre-London Olympic Games training camps.

=== Aquazone Waterpark ===
Aquazone is the name of a water park which operates in the National Aquatic Centre. The water park features three water slides (The Dark Hole, The Green Giant and the Master Blaster), a surfing machine, a lazy river and a large pool that generates waves.

== See also ==
- List of long course swimming pools in the Republic of Ireland
