= National Sports Campus =

Sports complex in Dublin, Ireland

Sport Ireland Campus
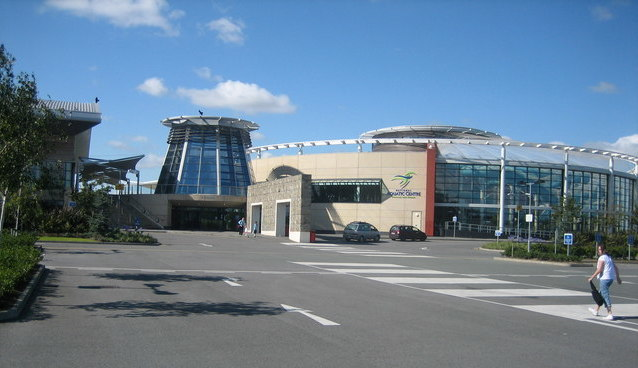
- The National Aquatic Centre is one of several facilities within the campus

- Location within Ireland
- Address: Abbotstown, Blanchardstown, Dublin; Ireland
- Coordinates: 53.3965°N 6.368°W
- Operator: National Sports Campus Development Authority
- Type: Multi-sport campus
- Acreage: 477
- Current use: National Aquatic Centre; National Dryland Diving Centre; National Gymnastics Training Centre; National Horse Sport Arena; National Indoor Arena; National Modern Pentathlon Centre

Website
- sportirelandcampus.ie

The Sport Ireland Campus (Irish: Spórt Éireann Campas), formerly known as National Sports Campus, is a large recreational site in Abbotstown, a northwestern suburb of Dublin in Ireland. It contains a number of sporting facilities, is operated by the National Sports Campus Development Authority, and is home to a number of sports venues, including the National Indoor Arena, National Aquatic Centre, and National Horse Sport Arena. Several national sports governing bodies, including the Gaelic Athletic Association, have sports facilities on the campus. Other Irish sports governing bodies, such as the Football Association of Ireland and Sport Ireland, have their headquarters on the site.

== Operations ==
The National Sports Campus Development Authority (NSCDA) was formally established on 1 January 2007 under the National Sports Campus Development Authority Act 2006. It was formed as a public body in Ireland, responsible for the creation, development, operation and promotion of a National Sports Campus.

The authority also has responsibility for the operation of the National Aquatic Centre on the Blanchardstown site. It discharges these responsibilities through its wholly-owned subsidiary Sport Ireland Facilities DAC (formerly NSCDA Operations Ltd).

== Site ==
The National Sports Campus is in the Abbotstown area of Blanchardstown, a northwestern suburb of Dublin. The 477-acre site is in the townland of Sheephill near Abbotstown House. This area was formerly mainly open farmland and previously accommodated the Marine Institute, State Laboratory and a farm operated by the Department of Agriculture.

== Development ==
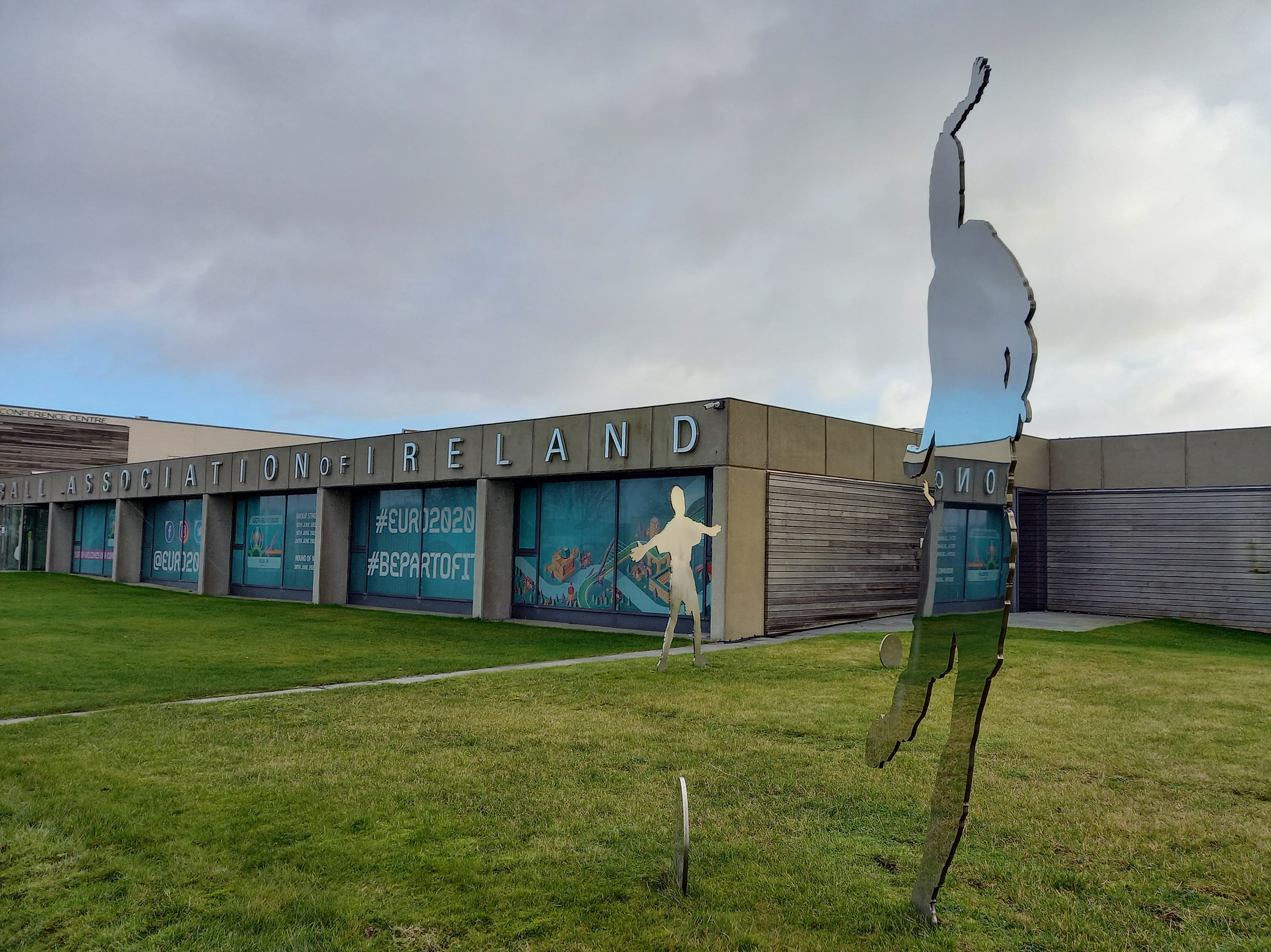
Football Association of Ireland headquarters

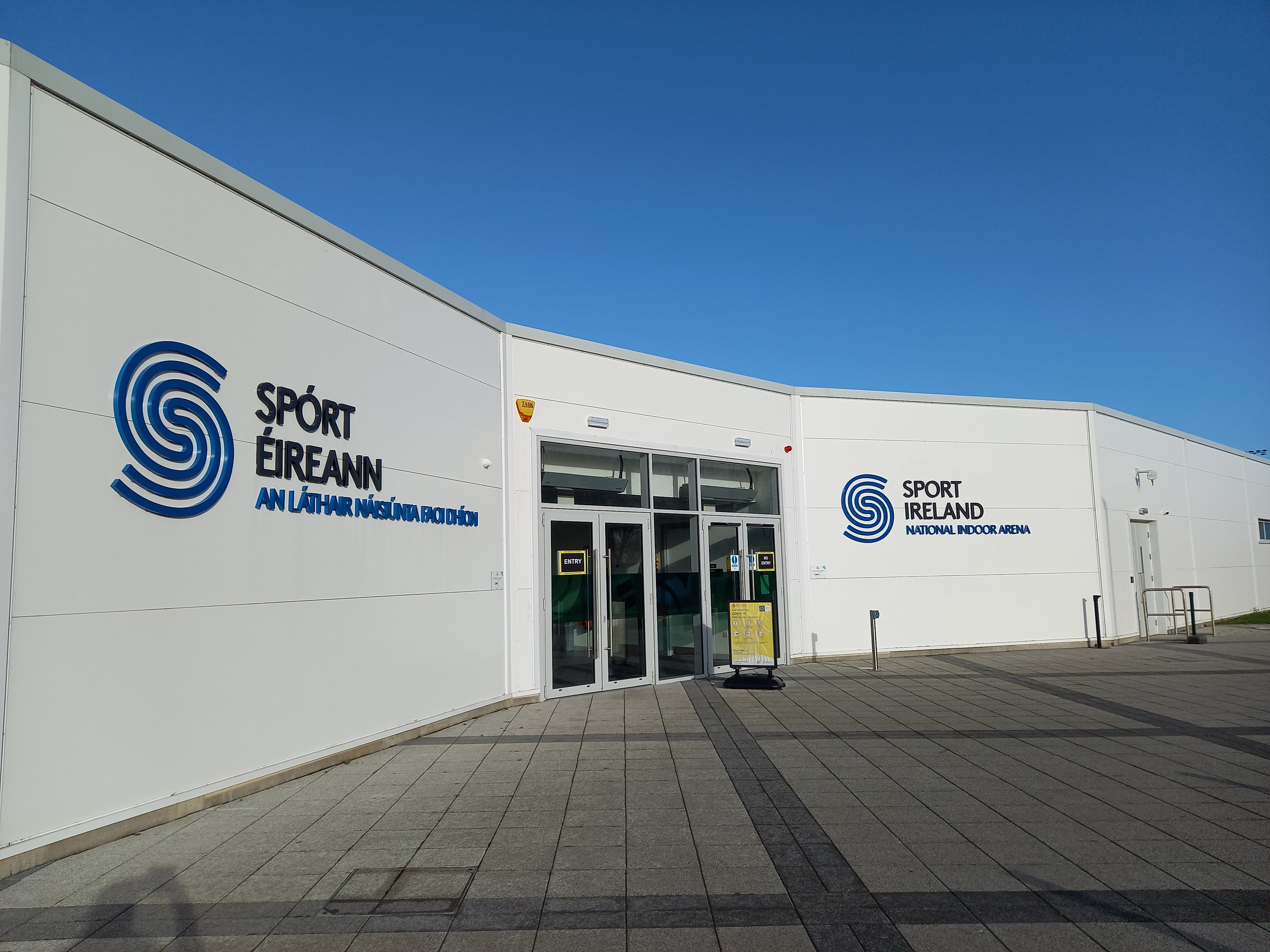
Sport Ireland's National Indoor Arena reception

The National Sports Campus Development Authority (NSCDA) allocated a number of plots on the site to accommodate the headquarters of the Football Association of Ireland (FAI), the Irish Institute of Sport (IIS) and the Irish Sport headquarters. The latter is home to the administrative headquarters of 19 national governing bodies of sport. The FAI moved from its former headquarters in Dublin city to new offices on the Campus in 2007.

In October 2013, the NSCDA completed the development of high performance training facilities for athletes in a variety of disciplines including modern pentathlon, fencing, pistol-shooting, and gymnastics. An equestrian centre, the National Horse Sport Arena, was also developed.

In 2016, the Gaelic Athletic Association opened a National Games Development Centre within the Campus. This facility includes several grass and artificial pitches, a pavilion with dressing rooms, a gym, and conference and dining facilities.

The NSCDA has also allocated sites for potential future development in partnership with the governing organisations responsible for cycling, rugby and hockey. For example, in March 2015, Fingal County Council gave planning permission for an indoor velodrome to be constructed as part of the National Sports Campus. While the track was originally projected to be completed before the 2020 Summer Olympics, construction was delayed. In September 2020, it was reported that representatives of Cycling Ireland were "hopeful" that the velodrome would be ready "in time for preparations for the 2024 Paris Olympics".

Sport Ireland announced development plans in November 2022, with a velodrome and cricket venues included. Construction of an international cricket stadium began in 2026, and was expected to be complete in time to stage matches in the Men's T20 World Cup in 2030.

In 2023, the FAI announced their intent to develop the training centre. In 2025, the campus broke ground on the construction of the velodrome.

== See also ==
- National Sports Centre (disambiguation)
