= List of Southeast Asian Championships records in swimming =

The fastest times in the swimming events at the Southeast Asian Swimming Championships are designated as the Southeast Asian Swimming Championships records in swimming in seniors. The events are held in a long course (50 m) pool.

== Championships records ==
All records were set in finals unless noted otherwise. All times are swum in a long-course (50m) pool.

=== Men ===
Event	Time	Name	Nationality	Date	Meet	Location	Ref
50m freestyle	23.17	Triady Fauzi	Indonesia	16 June 2012	2012 Championships	Singapore, Singapore	
100m freestyle	50.06	Hoàng Quý Phước	Vietnam	21 June 2014	2014 Championships	Singapore, Singapore	
200m freestyle	1:49.69	Hoàng Quý Phước	Vietnam	17 June 2014	2014 Championships	Singapore, Singapore	
400m freestyle	3:54.19	Kevin Yeap	Malaysia	15 June 2012	2012 Championships	Singapore, Singapore	
1500m freestyle	15:35.02	Kevin Yeap	Malaysia	16 June 2012	2012 Championships	Singapore, Singapore	
50m backstroke	25.52	I Gede Siman Sudartawa	Indonesia	18 June 2014	2014 Championships	Singapore, Singapore	
100m backstroke	55.32	I Gede Siman Sudartawa	Indonesia	15 June 2012	2012 Championships	Singapore, Singapore	
200m backstroke	2:02.94	Ricky Anggawijaya	Indonesia	21 June 2014	2014 Championships	Singapore, Singapore	
50m breaststroke	28.75	Lionel Khoo	Singapore	13 June 2012	2012 Championships	Singapore, Singapore	
100m breaststroke	1:02.79	Lionel Khoo	Singapore	14 June 2012	2012 Championships	Singapore, Singapore	
200m breaststroke	2:15.96	Yap See Tuan	Malaysia	16 June 2012	2012 Championships	Singapore, Singapore	
50m butterfly	24.38	Glenn Victor Sutanto	Indonesia	21 June 2014	2014 Championships	Singapore, Singapore	
100m butterfly	53.19	Glenn Victor Sutanto	Indonesia	15 June 2012	2012 Championships	Singapore, Singapore	
200m butterfly	1:59.22	Quah Zheng Wen	Singapore	17 June 2012	2012 Championships	Singapore, Singapore	
200m individual medley	2:02.05	Triady Fauzi	Indonesia	18 June 2014	2014 Championships	Singapore, Singapore	
400m individual medley	4:27.62	Quah Zheng Wen	Singapore	13 June 2012	2012 Championships	Singapore, Singapore	
4×100m freestyle relay	3:24.46	Clement Lim (50.96); Darren Lim (50.95); Benedict Boon (51.58); Danny Yeo (50.97)	Singapore	20 June 2014	2014 Championships	Singapore, Singapore	
4×200m freestyle relay	7:30.79	Danny Yeo (1:50.54); Teo Zhen Ren (1:53.19); Pang Sheng Jun (1:53.98); Jeremy Kevin Mathews (1:53.08)	Singapore	13 June 2012	2012 Championships	Singapore, Singapore	
4×100m medley relay	3:44.45	I Gede Siman Sudartawa (55.92); Dennis J. Tiwa (1:04.72); Glenn Victor Sutanto (53.13); Triady Fauzi (50.68)	Indonesia	22 June 2014	2014 Championships	Singapore, Singapore	

Legend: # – Record awaiting ratification by [[|]]; WR – World record; AS – Asian record;
Records not set in finals: h – heat; sf – semifinal; r – relay 1st leg; rh – relay heat 1st leg; b – B final; † – en route to final mark; tt – time trial

=== Women ===
Event	Time	Name	Nationality	Date	Meet	Location	Ref
50m freestyle	25.71	Amanda Lim	Singapore	17 Jun 2012	2012 Championships	Singapore, Singapore	
100m freestyle	56.02	Mylene Ong	Singapore	13 June 2012	2012 Championships	Singapore, Singapore	
200m freestyle	2:02.76	Amanda Lim	Singapore	16 June 2012	2012 Championships	Singapore, Singapore	
400m freestyle	4:12.94	Nguyễn Thị Ánh Viên	Vietnam	17 June 2014	2014 Championships	Singapore, Singapore	
800m freestyle	8:40.75	Nguyễn Thị Ánh Viên	Vietnam	21 June 2014	2014 Championships	Singapore, Singapore	
50m backstroke	29.51	Nguyễn Thị Ánh Viên	Vietnam	19 June 2014	2014 Championships	Singapore, Singapore	
100m backstroke	1:02.70	Nguyễn Thị Ánh Viên	Vietnam	15 June 2012	2012 Championships	Singapore, Singapore	
200m backstroke	2:12.74	Nguyễn Thị Ánh Viên	Vietnam	22 June 2014	2014 Championships	Singapore, Singapore	
50m breaststroke	33.16	Christina Loh	Malaysia	17 June 2012	2012 Championships	Singapore, Singapore	
100m breaststroke	1:10.66	Siow Yi Ting	Malaysia	14 June 2012	2012 Championships	Singapore, Singapore	
200m breaststroke	2:31.75	Siow Yi Ting	Malaysia	16 June 2012	2012 Championships	Singapore, Singapore	
50m butterfly	27.49	Marina Chan	Singapore	18 June 2014	2014 Championships	Singapore, Singapore	
100m butterfly	59.23	Tao Li	Singapore	15 June 2012	2012 Championships	Singapore, Singapore	
200m butterfly	2:12.46	Nguyễn Thị Ánh Viên	Vietnam	20 June 2014	2014 Championships	Singapore, Singapore	
200m individual medley	2:14.58	Nguyễn Thị Ánh Viên	Vietnam	22 June 2014	2014 Championships	Singapore, Singapore	
400m individual medley	4:49.03	Nguyễn Thị Ánh Viên	Vietnam	19 June 2014	2014 Championships	Singapore, Singapore	
4×100m freestyle relay	3:49.25	Mylene Ong (57.29); Koh Hui Yu (56.87); Amanda Lim (56.83); Teo Jing Wen (58.26)	Singapore	14 June 2012	2012 Championships	Singapore, Singapore	
4×200m freestyle relay	8:21.61	Junkrajang Natthanan (2:03.19); Sriphanomthorn Benjaporn (2:07.53); Hodgson Jessica Leela (2:08.15); Sarisa Suwannachet (2:02.74)	Thailand	19 June 2014	2014 Championships	Singapore, Singapore	
4×100m medley relay	4:15.27	Pawapotako Phiangkhwan; Salubluek Chavunnooch; Sarisa Suwannachet; Junkrajang Natthanan	Thailand	21 June 2014	2014 Championships	Singapore, Singapore	

Legend: # – Record awaiting ratification by [[|]]; WR – World record; AS – Asian record;
Records not set in finals: h – heat; sf – semifinal; r – relay 1st leg; rh – relay heat 1st leg; b – B final; † – en route to final mark; tt – time trial

== See also ==
- List of Southeast Asian Games records in swimming
