= Swimming at the 2018 Asian Games – Women's 50 metre breaststroke =

Asian Games swimming competition

Women's 50 metre breaststroke at the 2018 Asian Games
- Venue: Gelora Bung Karno Aquatic Stadium
- Date: 23 August 2018
- Competitors: 30 from 22 nations

Medalists
gold medal	Satomi Suzuki	Japan
silver medal	Roanne Ho	Singapore
bronze medal	Feng Junyang	China

The women's 50 metre breaststroke event at the 2018 Asian Games took place on 23 August at the Gelora Bung Karno Aquatic Stadium.

== Schedule ==
All times are Western Indonesia Time (UTC+07:00)

Date	Time	Event
Thursday, 23 August 2018	09:12	Heats
Thursday, 23 August 2018	18:06	Final

== Records ==
Prior to this competition, the existing world, Asian and Games records were as follows.

World Record	Lilly King (USA)	29.40	Budapest, Hungary	30 July 2017
Asian Record	Chen Huijia (CHN)	30.46	Hong Kong	6 December 2009
Games Record	Satomi Suzuki (JPN)	30.96	Jakarta, Indonesia	19 August 2018

== Results ==
Legend

- DSQ — Disqualified

=== Heats ===
Rank	Heat	Athlete	Time	Notes
1	4	Satomi Suzuki (JPN)	31.02	
2	4	Feng Junyang (CHN)	31.16	
3	3	Miho Teramura (JPN)	31.26	
4	2	Suo Ran (CHN)	31.38	
5	3	Phee Jinq En (MAS)	31.46	
6	2	Roanne Ho (SGP)	31.59	
7	3	Lin Pei-wun (TPE)	31.77	
8	2	Adelaida Pchelintseva (KAZ)	31.94	
9	4	Yvette Kong (HKG)	31.98	
10	2	Back Su-yeon (KOR)	32.34	
11	4	Kim Hye-jin (KOR)	32.44	
12	4	Anandia Evato (INA)	32.61	
13	2	Jenjira Srisa-ard (THA)	32.62	
14	3	Samantha Yeo (SGP)	32.74	
15	3	Rainbow Ip (HKG)	32.84	
16	4	Lei On Kei (MAC)	33.24	
17	3	Ngô Thị Ngọc Quỳnh (VIE)	33.89	
18	2	Cheang Weng Lam (MAC)	33.93	
19	4	Jang Myong-gyong (PRK)	34.95	
20	1	Anak Agung Istri Kania Ratih (INA)	35.15	
21	3	Sok Voleak (CAM)	36.00	
22	3	Mera Abushammaleh (PLE)	37.10	
23	4	Mishael Aisha Ayub (PAK)	37.15	
24	2	Temüüjingiin Amingoo (MGL)	38.60	
25	1	Karina Klimyk (TJK)	39.26	
26	1	Tisa Shakya (NEP)	39.46	
27	2	Khadiza Akter (BAN)	39.57	
28	1	Siri Arun Budcharern (LAO)	39.85	
29	1	Aishath Sajina (MDV)	41.34	
30	1	Aishath Hulva Khulail (MDV)	42.08	

=== Final ===
Rank	Athlete	Time	Notes
1st place, gold medalist(s)	Satomi Suzuki (JPN)	30.83	GR
2nd place, silver medalist(s)	Roanne Ho (SGP)	31.23	
3rd place, bronze medalist(s)	Feng Junyang (CHN)	31.24	
4	Suo Ran (CHN)	31.42	
5	Phee Jinq En (MAS)	31.64	
6	Lin Pei-wun (TPE)	31.72	
7	Adelaida Pchelintseva (KAZ)	31.94	
—	Miho Teramura (JPN)	DSQ	
