= Samantha Yeo =

Singaporean swimmer

Personal information
- Full name: Samantha Louisa Ginn Yeo
- National team: Singapore
- Born: 24 January 1997 (age 29) Singapore
- Height: 1.67 m (5 ft 6 in)
- Weight: 56 kg (123 lb)

Sport
- Sport: Swimming
- Strokes: Breaststroke, medley
- Club: Ace Swim Club (2010–11); Swimfast Aquatic Club (2012–14)
- College team: University of Michigan
- Coach: David Lim
Medal record
Women's swimming
Representing Singapore
Event	1st	2nd	3rd
Asian Games	0	0	1
Asian Championships	0	0	1
Southeast Asian Games	3	1	4
Asian Youth Games	1	4	0
Southeast Asian Championships	2	3	2
Total	6	8	8
Asian Games
Bronze medal – third place	2018 Jakarta	4×100 m medley
Asian Championships
Bronze medal – third place	2012 Dubai	50 m breaststroke
Southeast Asian Games
Gold medal – first place	2011 Palembang	4×100 m medley
Gold medal – first place	2013 Naypyidaw	4×100 m medley
Gold medal – first place	2017 Kuala Lumpur	4×100 m medley
Silver medal – second place	2017 Kuala Lumpur	100 m breaststroke
Bronze medal – third place	2011 Palembang	200 m breaststroke
Bronze medal – third place	2013 Palembang	200 m breaststroke
Bronze medal – third place	2017 Kuala Lumpur	50 m breaststroke
Bronze medal – third place	2017 Kuala Lumpur	200 m breaststroke
Southeast Asian Championships
Gold medal – first place	2012 Singapore	4×100 m medley
Gold medal – first place	2014 Singapore	100 m breaststroke
Silver medal – second place	2014 Singapore	50 m breaststroke
Silver medal – second place	2014 Singapore	200 m breaststroke
Silver medal – second place	2014 Singapore	4×100 m medley
Bronze medal – third place	2012 Singapore	50 m breaststroke
Bronze medal – third place	2012 Singapore	200 m medley
Asian Youth Games
Gold medal – first place	2013 Nanjing	50 m breaststroke
Silver medal – second place	2013 Nanjing	100 m breaststroke
Silver medal – second place	2013 Nanjing	200 m breaststroke
Silver medal – second place	2013 Nanjing	4×100 m freestyle
Silver medal – second place	2013 Nanjing	4×100 m medley

Samantha Louisa Ginn Yeo (born 24 January 1997) is a Singaporean breaststroke and medley swimmer. Competing in her first of three Southeast Asian Games at just 12 years of age, Yeo has represented her country at the long course and short course World Championships, the FINA World Cup, Asian Games, Asian Swimming Championships, Commonwealth Games, Youth Olympic Games and Asian Youth Games. In June 2014, Yeo was recruited to the Michigan Wolverines on a partial, performance-based, sports scholarship.

== Early life and education ==
Yeo was born on 24 January 1997, the eldest daughter of Steven and Javine Yeo. She completed her Primary School Leaving Examination at CHIJ Saint Nicholas Girls' School in Ang Mo Kio. She was offered a place at Singapore Sports School but chose Raffles Girls' School for her secondary education. In June 2014, Yeo was recruited to the University of Michigan, where she now swims for the Michigan Wolverines swimming and diving team on a partial, performance-based athletic scholarship.

== Career ==
=== Schools competition ===
Yeo took part in the 2008 Pacific School Games in Canberra, Australia where she won five medals, including gold in the 50-metre backstroke and in the 4 × 50-metre freestyle relay.

In the 51st National Schools Swimming Championships, 2010, Yeo lowered the under-14's 100-metre breaststroke national record a further three times.

Yeo won another four medals at the 52nd National Schools Swimming Championships in 2011. Taking out the 50 and 100-metre breaststroke events in new meet record times, Yeo also lowered her personal best in the 100-metre event twice.

Yeo continued her record-breaking success at the 2011 ASEAN School Games in Singapore. Bagging two golds, a silver and a bronze medal, Yeo set two new national under-17's relay records.

Yeo started 2012 with a solid performance at the 53rd National Schools Swimming Championships, by winning three gold medals.

Another successful ASEAN School Games meet in Surabaya, Indonesia followed with Yeo picking six medals including two gold and another national under-17's record in the 4 × 100-metre freestyle relay.

Yeo began the year by defending her title in the 100-metre breaststroke at the 54th National Schools Swimming Championships. Claiming victory with a time of 1:11.90, this broke her own meet record and came within 0.03 seconds of her personal best time. She also swam her quickest-ever first 50-metre split in 33.55 seconds. In the 200-metre breaststroke, Yeo won silver in a new national under-17's record time of 2:34.07, shaving 0.22 seconds off Nicolette Teo's 11-year-old mark.

Yeo commenced 2014 by competing in her fifth National Schools Swimming Championships. Swimming in the 16–19 age group, the 17-year-old won gold in the 200-metre breaststroke in 2:34.17. Finishing 14 seconds ahead of Singapore Sports School's Amanda Tam, Yeo smashed Cheryl Lim's 2011 meet record by three seconds. In the heats of the 100-metre breaststroke, Yeo was the fastest qualifier in a meet record time of 1:12.58, eclipsing Cheryl Lim's 1:14.06 set in 2011. In the final, Yeo clocked a time of 1:11.65 but was disqualified for executing alternating kicks. The time would have been a new meet record and gold medal. Devastated by the result, she told The Straits Times that it was the third time this year that she been disqualified for her kicks. However, she later teamed up with Jing Wen Shan, Madeline Quek and Song Ai Vee to win gold in the 4 × 50-metre medley relay with 2:02.88, shaving 0.03 seconds off Raffles's 2012 meet record and the same quartet won gold in the 4 × 50-metre freestyle relay in 1:50.44, narrowly missing the meet record of 1:49.24.

=== Age-Group Competition ===
Yeo first competed for Singapore at the age of 11 at the 32nd Southeast Asian Age Group Swimming Championships in Bangkok, Thailand in June 2008. In April 2009, now aged 12, Yeo, representing the Ace Swim Club at the 7th ASEAN Inter-Club Age Group Swimming Championships in Singapore, won eight medals – six gold and two silver – and set two meet records. Following a successful meet at the 33rd Southeast Asian Age Group Swimming Championships in Kuala Lumpur, Malaysia, where she picked up five medals.

This was followed by another highly successful meet at the 34th Southeast Asian Age Group Swimming Championships in Manila, Philippines, where she won nine medals from nine events and broke a further two meet records.

She then lowered her personal best time in the 50-metre breaststroke to 33.35 at the 35th Southeast Asian Age Group Swimming Championships in Da Nang, Vietnam, where she won four medals.

After missing the inaugural Asian Youth Games in 2009 due to age restrictions, Yeo won five medals at the 2013 Asian Youth Games in Nanjing including gold in the 50-metre breaststroke in a new personal best of 32.56. Yeo collected silver in the 100-metre breaststroke, 200-metre breaststroke, 4 × 100-metre medley relay with Marina Chan, Stacy Tan, Meagan Lim and 4 × 100-metre freestyle relay alongside Chan, Hoong En Qi, Rachel Tseng in a new national under-17's record time of 3:54.67, slashing 1.88 seconds from the previous mark.

Missing the 2010 Singapore Games due to age restrictions, Yeo made her Youth Olympics debut in Nanjing where she reached the semi-finals in the 50-metre breaststroke and the 100-metre breaststroke.

=== Open competition ===
Yeo completed in her first Hong Kong International Open in September 2009, picking up a silver in the 200-metre breaststroke in a new personal best time and with Amanda Lim, Mylene Ong and Koh Ting Ting also won silver in the 4 × 100-metre freestyle relay.

In November, at the final leg of the 2009 FINA Swimming World Cup in Singapore, Yeo reached the final of the three breaststroke events then closed out the year by finishing fourth in the 200-metre breaststroke at the 2009 Southeast Asian Games in Vientiane, Laos in a new national under-14's record time of 2:36.04, improving on Nicolette Teo's previous mark of 2:36.27 set at the 1999 Southeast Asian Games. This feat added to the national under-14's 100-metre breaststroke record she broke at the 2009 National Schools Swimming Championships six months earlier. Stopping the clock at 1:14.05, this shaved 0.02 seconds off Joscelin Yeo's time set at the Asia Pacific Swimming Meet in September 1991.

Three months later, she won gold in the 4 × 100-metre medley relay with Lynette Ng, Tao Li and Mylene Ong at the 2010 Hong Kong International Open, where she also won bronze in the 100-metre breaststroke. Qualifying third fastest in the heats in 1:13.13, she broke her own national under-14's record by 0.07 seconds. In the final, she lowered it again to 1:12.77, the sixth time she had done so in 14 months.

At her home leg of the 2010 FINA Swimming World Cup, Yeo set her first national open record when she finished 5th in the 200-metre breaststroke in 2:34.27 and finished the year by setting a new national under-14's record time of 33.53 in the 50-metre breaststroke at the 2010 Asian Games in Guangzhou, China.

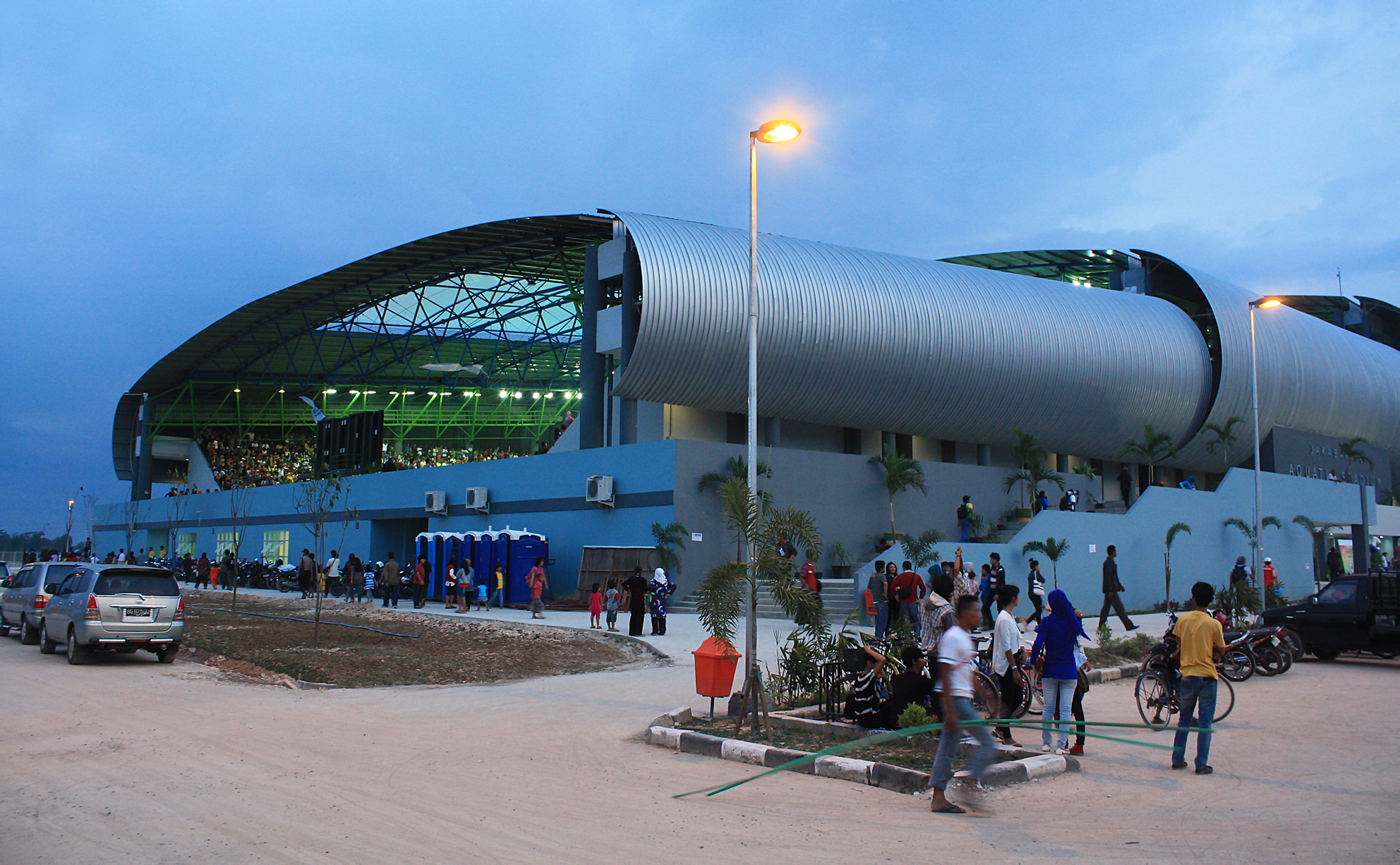
The Jakabaring Aquatic Center where Yeo won two medals at the 2011 Southeast Asian Games

Yeo began 2011 by equalling her national under-14's record in the 200-metre breaststroke at the 2011 Victorian Open Championships in Melbourne. In June 2011, Yeo won her first national title in the 50-metre breaststroke at the Singapore Championships, finishing 0.20 seconds shy of Nicolette Teo's 2006 meet record of 33.49.

In November, Yeo set a new national short course record of 32.90 in the 50-metre breaststroke at the Singaporean leg of the 2011 FINA Swimming World Cup and finished the season with two medals at the 2011 Southeast Asian Games in Palembang, Indonesia. She won bronze in the 200-metre breaststroke and with Amanda Lim, Tao Li and Shana Lim won gold in the 4 × 100-metre medley relay. She also achieved a new personal best time of 1:12.13 in the final of 100-metre breaststroke, where she finished in 4th place.

She then backed this up with a three-medal haul at the inaugural Southeast Asian Swimming Championships in Singapore. With Shana Lim, Tao Li and Mylene Ong, Yeo set the first championship record in the 4 × 100-metre medley relay with a time of 4:17.99 and individually won bronze in the 50-metre breaststroke, bronze in the 200-metre individual medley and finished 4th in the 200-metre breaststroke in 2:34.93, smashing her personal best by over a second.

At the National Championships in August, Yeo claimed the national title in the 100-metre breaststroke in a new personal best time of 1:11.87, breaking the 1:12.00 barrier for the first time. This time also broke Joscelin Yeo's seven-year-old meet record of 1:12.36, and was achieved a mere 30 minutes after her silver medal in the 400-metre individual medley. The following week at the SSA Grand Prix short course event, Yeo set a further two national open records. In the 200-metre breaststroke, she slashed four seconds from her 2010 record to lower it to 2:30.14 and in the 100-metre breaststroke Yeo swam 1:10.04 to break Cheryl Lim's 2009 mark of 1:10.68.

In November, Yeo lowered her own national mark in the 50-metre breaststroke to 32.75 at the Tokyo leg of the 2012 FINA Swimming World Cup. Seven days later at the eighth and final leg in Singapore, Yeo set two more national records. In the 200-metre breaststroke, the time was lowered to 2:29.74 and in the 50-metre breaststroke she stopped the clock at 32.72, wiping 0.03 seconds from her record set in Tokyo. After finishing equal third in the 50-metre breaststroke in a new personal best time of 33.09 at the Dubai Asian Swimming Championships, Yeo set a further two national records at the 2012 FINA World Swimming Championships (25 m) in Istanbul. Although she did not advance to the semi-finals, Yeo clocked 1:09.28 in the 100-metre breaststroke to wipe 0.76 seconds from her previous mark and clocked 32.63 in the 50-metre breaststroke, improving on her previous record by 0.09 seconds.

June 2013 saw Yeo clinch four titles at the 2013 Singapore Championships, her best results at the Nationals to date. In the heats of 100-metre breaststroke, Yeo set a new personal best time of 1:11.57, lowering it by 0.33 seconds. In the final, Yeo defended her title in a new national under-17's record time of 1:10.49, erasing the mark of 1:11.37 set 18 years prior by Joscelin Yeo at the 1995 Southeast Asian Games. The time slashed a further 1.08 seconds from her personal best and came within 0.34 seconds of Nicolette Teo's national open record of 1:10.15. In the 200-metre breaststroke, Yeo won gold in a 2:32.34, lowering her own national under-17's record and set a new meet record. She completed the set by taking out the 50-metre breaststroke in 33.01, in another new meet record and personal best time. Her final gold medal was won in the 200-metre individual medley in a new personal best and meet record time of 2:19.11. Yeo also won silver in the 400-metre individual medley.

In August, Yeo set another personal best time in the 50-metre breaststroke event at the 2013 World Aquatics Championships in Barcelona. Clocking 32.69, this came within a quarter of a second of Roanne Ho's national open and under-17's record of 32.44.

"But I'm really grateful to be back and competing at my third SEA Games. A lot of credit has to go to my family and coach for these two medals. All things considered, I couldn't have asked for a better end to my campaign."

— Samantha Yeo, 15 December 2013

Yeo closed out the year by winning two medals at her third Southeast Asian Games in Naypyidaw, Burma. In the 4 × 100-metre medley relay, Yeo with Tao Li, Amanda Lim and Quah Ting Wen won gold in 4:13.02, extending Singapore's winning streak in the event to six. In her individual events, Yeo won bronze in the 200-metre breaststroke in 2:34.27, 4th in the 100-metre breaststroke in 1:12.79 and 6th in the 200-metre individual medley in 2:22.51. Yeo was delighted with her results, considering the injury sustained to her leg only eight weeks prior. She said "I was devastated because when I got injured, we were on the verge of giving up these SEA Games for the good of my long-term competitive future. We had just two weeks of training and it took a toll on me not just physically but also mentally, because there was also the fear of a recurrence of the injury." Her coach, David Lim revealed that Yeo's training regime was increased to three times a day in the last week to make up for lost time in terms of fitness.

At the 2014 Southeast Asian Swimming Championships in Singapore, Yeo won four medals including gold in the 100-metre breaststroke in 1:12.26. Though she finished 0.3 seconds ahead of the field, she was still disappointed, stating that "there are many areas that I have to work on, my time wasn't my personal best and I was definitely looking for a better time". She also won silver in the 50-metre breaststroke in 33.39, silver in the 200-metre breaststroke in 2:35.95 and in the 4 × 100-metre medley relay Yeo with Marina Chan, Amanda Lim and Tan Jing-E won silver in 4:15.54. Finishing just 0.27 seconds behind Thailand, both teams swam under the meet record of 4:17.99. In her final event of the meet, Yeo finished 6th in the 200-metre individual medley in 2:22.16.

One month later at the 2014 Commonwealth Games in Glasgow, Yeo reached the semi-finals of the 50-metre breaststroke before heading to the 2014 Summer Youth Olympics in Nanjing in August. In September, Yeo competed at the 2014 Asian Games in Incheon, South Korea, where she just missed the final of the 50-metre breaststroke, finishing 9th in the semi-final in 33.26.

== National records ==
Yeo has set nine national open short course records, and currently holds records in two events (as shown in the table below in bold).

No.	Distance	Event	Time	Meet	Location	Date	Ref
1	200 m	Breaststroke	2:34.27	World Cup	Singapore	17 October 2010	
2	50 m	Breaststroke	32.90	World Cup	Singapore	5 November 2011	
3	100 m	Breaststroke	1:10.04	SSA Grand Prix	Singapore	18 August 2012	
4	200 m	Breaststroke (2)	2:30.14	SSA Grand Prix	Singapore	19 August 2012	
5	50 m	Breaststroke (2)	32.75	World Cup	Tokyo	7 November 2012	
6	50 m	Breaststroke (3)	32.72	World Cup	Singapore	11 November 2012	
7	200 m	Breaststroke (3)	2:29.74	World Cup	Singapore	11 November 2012	
8	50 m	Breaststroke (4)	32.63	World Championships	Istanbul	12 December 2012	
9	100 m	Breaststroke (2)	1:09.28	World Championships	Istanbul	14 December 2012	

== Awards ==
Yeo was named the Best School Girl in swimming at the Singapore Schools Sports Council's 43rd Colours Award Presentation in September 2013 and received a team meritorious award at the Singapore National Olympic Council's 2012 Singapore Sports Awards.
