= Swimming at the 2013 SEA Games – Men's 200 metre individual medley =

The Men's 200 metre individual medley event at the 2013 SEA Games took place on 13 December 2013 at Wunna Theikdi Aquatics Centre.

There were 14 competitors from 7 countries who took part in this event. Two heats were held. The heat in which a swimmer competed did not formally matter for advancement, as the swimmers with the top eight times from both field qualified for the finals.

== Schedule ==
All times are Myanmar Standard Time (UTC+06:30)

| Date | Time | Event |
|---|---|---|
| Thursday, 13 December 2013 | 09:21 | Heats |
| Thursday, 13 December 2013 | 18:49 | Final |

== Records ==
Prior to this competition, the existing world, Asian, and Southeast Asian Games records were as follows.

| World Record | Ryan Lochte (USA) | 1:54.00 | Shanghai, China | 28 July 2011 |
| Asian Record | Kosuke Hagino (JPN) | 1:55.74 | Niigata, Japan | 13 April 2013 |
| Games Record | Nuttapong Ketin (THA) | 2:02.90 | Palembang, Indonesia | 17 November 2011 |

== Results ==
=== Heats ===
| Rank | Heat | Lane | Athlete | Time | Notes |
|---|---|---|---|---|---|
| 1 | 2 | 4 | Joseph Schooling (SIN) | 2:05.10 | Q |
| 2 | 2 | 6 | Nisit Chandrakoolphong (THA) | 2:08.26 | Q |
| 3 | 2 | 5 | Matt Louis Navata (PHI) | 2:08.29 | Q |
| 4 | 1 | 3 | Nuttapong Ketin (THA) | 2:09.68 | Q |
| 5 | 1 | 4 | Tran Duy Khoi (VIE) | 2:10.28 | Q |
| 6 | 1 | 2 | Rodrick Luhur (INA) | 2:10.49 | Q |
| 7 | 1 | 6 | Phan Gia Man (VIE) | 2:11.37 | Q |
| 8 | 2 | 2 | Jeau Zhi Vernon Lee (MAS) | 2:11.41 | Q |
| 9 | 2 | 3 | Pang Sheng Jun (SIN) | 2:12.48 | |
| 10 | 2 | 7 | Satrio Bagaskara Gunadi Putra (INA) | 2:14.37 | |
| 11 | 1 | 7 | Wong Fu Kang (MAS) | 2:15.22 | |
| 12 | 2 | 1 | Ye Myint Hein (MYA) | 2:17.24 | |
| 13 | 1 | 1 | Min Thu Htet (MYA) | 2:37.36 | |
| - | 1 | 5 | Banjo Borja (PHI) | DNS | |

=== Final ===
| Rank | Lane | Athlete | Time | Notes |
|---|---|---|---|---|
| 1st place, gold medalist(s) | 4 | Joseph Schooling (SIN) | 2:00.82 | GR |
| 2nd place, silver medalist(s) | 2 | Tran Duy Khoi (VIE) | 2:03.81 | NR |
| 3rd place, bronze medalist(s) | 6 | Nuttapong Ketin (THA) | 2:05.06 | |
| 4 | 3 | Matt Louis Navata (PHI) | 2:05.44 | |
| 5 | 5 | Nisit Chandrakoolphong (THA) | 2:05.69 | |
| 6 | 8 | Jeau Zhi Vernon Lee (MAS) | 2:08.78 | |
| 7 | 7 | Rodrick Luhur (INA) | 2:09.26 | |
| 8 | 1 | Phan Gia Man (VIE) | 2:09.48 | |
