= Yessy Yosaputra =

Indonesian swimmer (born 1994)

Yessy Venisia Yosaputra
Personal information
- Nationality: Indonesia
- Born: 27 August 1994 (age 31) Bandung, Indonesia
- Height: 1.68 m (5 ft 6 in)
- Weight: 62 kg (137 lb)

Sport
- Sport: Swimming
- Strokes: Backstroke
Medal record
Women's swimming
Representing Indonesia
Asian Beach Games
Silver medal – second place	2010 Muscat	Open water 10 km
Islamic Solidarity Games
Silver medal – second place	2013 Palembang	100 m backstroke
Silver medal – second place	2013 Palembang	200 m backstroke
SEA Games
Gold medal – first place	2011 Jakarta–Palembang	200 m backstroke
Silver medal – second place	2013 Naypyidaw	200 m backstroke
Silver medal – second place	2015 Singapore	200 m backstroke
Southeast Asian Championships
Silver medal – second place	2012 Singapore	200 m backstroke
Bronze medal – third place	2012 Singapore	100 m backstroke
ASEAN University Games
Gold medal – first place	2016 Singapore	200 m backstroke
Silver medal – second place	2016 Singapore	50 m backstroke
Silver medal – second place	2016 Singapore	100 m backstroke

Yessy Venisia Yosaputra (born 27 August 1994) is an Indonesian swimmer. She specializes in backstroke. She competed in numerous international events representing Indonesia and received gold in the 2011 SEA Games. She represented her country at the 2016 Summer Olympics.
