= Swimming at the 2014 Asian Games – Women's 50 metre breaststroke =

Women's 50 metre breaststroke at the 2014 Asian Games
- Venue: Munhak Park Tae-hwan Aquatics Center
- Date: 25 September 2014
- Competitors: 22 from 16 nations

Medalists
gold medal	Satomi Suzuki	Japan
silver medal	Suo Ran	China
bronze medal	He Yuzhe	China

The women's 50 metre breaststroke event at the 2014 Asian Games took place on 25 September 2014 at Munhak Park Tae-hwan Aquatics Center.

== Schedule ==
All times are Korea Standard Time (UTC+09:00)

Date	Time	Event
Thursday, 25 September 2014	09:00	Heats
Thursday, 25 September 2014	19:06	Final

== Records ==
Prior to this competition, the existing world, Asian and Games records were as follows.

World Record	Rūta Meilutytė (LTU)	29.48	Barcelona, Spain	3 August 2013
Asian Record	Chen Huijia (CHN)	30.46	Hong Kong	6 December 2009
Games Record	Wang Randi (CHN)	31.04	Guangzhou, China	13 November 2010

== Results ==
Legend

- DNS — Did not start

=== Heats ===
Rank	Heat	Athlete	Time	Notes
1	1	Suo Ran (CHN)	31.59	
2	2	Kanako Watanabe (JPN)	31.81	
3	3	He Yuzhe (CHN)	31.83	
4	3	Satomi Suzuki (JPN)	31.98	
5	2	Yang Ji-won (KOR)	32.47	
5	3	Yvette Kong (HKG)	32.47	
7	2	Lei On Kei (MAC)	32.83	
8	1	Roanne Ho (SIN)	33.21	
9	2	Samantha Yeo (SIN)	33.26	
10	3	Huang Wen-chi (TPE)	33.28	
11	1	Jamie Yeung (HKG)	33.35	
12	1	Dariya Talanova (KGZ)	33.68	
13	1	Jenjira Srisa-ard (THA)	34.09	
14	3	Fotimakhon Amilova (UZB)	36.58	
15	2	Anushe Dinyar Engineer (PAK)	38.79	
16	2	Keýik Weliýewa (TKM)	39.32	
17	1	Saintöriin Nomun (MGL)	39.58	
18	3	Hem Thon Vitiny (CAM)	39.59	
19	2	Sonira Bista (NEP)	40.71	
20	3	Aishath Sajina (MDV)	41.91	
21	3	Enkhmandakhyn Nandinzayaa (MGL)	45.24	
—	1	Simrah Nasir (PAK)	DNS	

=== Final ===
Rank	Athlete	Time	Notes
1st place, gold medalist(s)	Satomi Suzuki (JPN)	31.34	
2nd place, silver medalist(s)	Suo Ran (CHN)	31.52	
3rd place, bronze medalist(s)	He Yuzhe (CHN)	31.62	
4	Kanako Watanabe (JPN)	31.64	
5	Yvette Kong (HKG)	32.33	
6	Yang Ji-won (KOR)	32.35	
7	Roanne Ho (SIN)	32.70	
8	Lei On Kei (MAC)	32.71	
