= Swimming at the 2017 SEA Games – Women's 100 metre backstroke =

Swimming – Women's 100 metre backstroke at the 2017 SEA Games
- Venue: National Aquatic Centre
- Date: 21 August 2017
- Competitors: 9 from 5 nations
- Winning time: 1:01.89 GR, NR

Medalists
gold medal	Nguyễn Thị Ánh Viên	Vietnam
silver medal	Nurul Fajar Fitriyati	Indonesia
bronze medal	Phiangkhwan Pawapotako	Thailand

The women's 100 metre backstroke competition of the swimming event at the 2017 SEA Games was held on 21 August at the National Aquatic Centre in Kuala Lumpur, Malaysia.

== Records ==
Prior to this competition, the existing Asian and Games records were as follows:

Asian Record	Aya Terakawa (JPN)	58.70	Barcelona, Spain	4 August 2013
Games Record	Tao Li (SIN)	1:02.11	Palembang, Indonesia	16 December 2011

The following records were established during the competition:

Date	Event	Name	Nationality	Time	Record
21 August	Final	Nguyễn Thị Ánh Viên	Vietnam (VIE)	1:01.89	GR

== Schedule ==
All times are Malaysia Standard Time (UTC+08:00)

Date	Time	Event
Monday, 21 August 2017	09:40	Heat 1
Monday, 21 August 2017	09:40	Heat 2
Monday, 21 August 2017	20:00	Final

== Results ==
=== Heats ===
The heats were held on 21 August.

==== Heat 1 ====
Source: Heat 1 results

Rank	Lane	Athletes	Time	Notes
1	5	Hoong En Qi (SGP)	01:05.20	Q
2	3	Yessy Venisia Yosaputra (INA)	01:05.25	Q
3	6	Caroline Chan (MAS)	01:05.89	Q
4	2	Nguyễn Diệp Phương (VIE)	01:06.54	
5	4	Nicole Oliva (PHI)	01:07.06	

==== Heat 2 ====
Source: Heat 2 results

Rank	Lane	Athletes	Time	Notes
1	7	Nguyễn Thị Ánh Viên (VIE)	01:03.84	Q
3	3	Roxanne Ashley Yu (PHI)	01:05.40	Q
2	5	Nurul Fajar Fitriyati (INA)	01:05.41	Q
4	6	Araya Wongvat (THA)	01:05.43	Q
5	4	Phiangkhwan Pawapotako (THA)	01:05.58	Q
6	2	Nan Honey Oo (MYA)	01:15.46	

=== Final ===
Source: Final Results

The final was held on 21 August.

Rank	Lane	Athletes	Time	Notes
1st place, gold medalist(s)	4	Nguyễn Thị Ánh Viên (VIE)	1:01.89	GR, NR
2nd place, silver medalist(s)	2	Nurul Fajar Fitriyati (INA)	1:04.10	NR
3rd place, bronze medalist(s)	1	Phiangkhwan Pawapotako (THA)	1:04.59	
4	5	Hoong En Qi (SGP)	1:05.03	
5	3	Yessy Venisia Yosaputra (INA)	1:05.10	
6	7	Araya Wongvat (THA)	1:06.15	
7	8	Caroline Chan (MAS)	1:05.90	
8	6	Roxanne Ashley Yu (PHI)	1:06.10	
