= 2018 FINA World Swimming Championships (25 m) – Women's 50 metre breaststroke =

Women's swimming competition

Women's 50 metre breaststroke at the 2018 FINA World Swimming Championships (25 m)
- Venue: Hangzhou Sports Park Stadium
- Dates: 11 December (heats and semifinals); 12 December (final)
- Competitors: 56 from 51 nations
- Winning time: 29.05

Medalists
gold medal	Alia Atkinson	Jamaica
silver medal	Rūta Meilutytė	Lithuania
bronze medal	Martina Carraro	Italy

The women's 50 metre breaststroke competition of the 2018 FINA World Swimming Championships (25 m) was held on 11 and 12 December 2018.

== Records ==
Prior to the competition, the existing world and championship records were as follows.

	Name	Nation	Time	Location	Date
World record	Alia Atkinson	Jamaica	28.56	Budapest	6 October 2018
Championship record	Rūta Meilutytė	Lithuania	28.81	Doha	3 December 2014

== Results ==
=== Heats ===
The heats were started on 11 December at 10:38.

Rank	Heat	Lane	Name	Nationality	Time	Notes
1	5	4	Rūta Meilutytė	Lithuania	29.56	Q
2	4	1	Katie Meili	United States	29.94	Q
3	6	2	Martina Carraro	Italy	30.00	Q, NR
3	6	4	Alia Atkinson	Jamaica	30.00	Q
5	5	5	Ida Hulkko	Finland	30.13	Q
6	6	5	Jenna Laukkanen	Finland	30.19	Q
7	4	2	Miho Teramura	Japan	30.20	Q, NR
7	4	6	Jessica Hansen	Australia	30.20	Q
9	5	3	Arianna Castiglioni	Italy	30.21	Q
10	6	6	Fanny Lecluyse	Belgium	30.34	Q
11	5	7	Suo Ran	China	30.42	Q
12	4	5	Emily Seebohm	Australia	30.46	Q
13	5	2	Petra Chocová	Czech Republic	30.48	Q
14	5	6	Maria Temnikova	Russia	30.49	Q
15	4	3	Kim Busch	Netherlands	30.58	Q
16	6	7	Feng Junyang	China	30.69	Q
17	6	8	Jessica Steiger	Germany	30.72	
18	5	1	Anna Sztankovics	Hungary	30.76	
19	6	3	Susann Bjørnsen	Norway	30.83	
20	4	7	Jessica Vall	Spain	30.88	
21	3	6	Adelaida Pchelintseva	Kazakhstan	30.96	NR
22	5	0	Cornelia Pammer	Austria	31.00	
22	6	9	Maria Romanjuk	Estonia	31.00	
24	4	9	Lisa Mamie	Switzerland	31.04	NR
24	5	9	Tatiana Chișca	Moldova	31.04	
26	3	4	Jenjira Srisaard	Thailand	31.15	
27	5	8	Julia Sebastián	Argentina	31.16	
28	3	3	Mercedes Toledo	Venezuela	31.19	NR
29	6	1	Vitalina Simonova	Russia	31.20	
30	4	8	Andrea Podmaníková	Slovakia	31.34	
31	4	0	Niamh Coyne	Ireland	31.42	
32	6	0	Lin Pei-wun	Chinese Taipei	31.56	
33	3	5	Tilka Paljk	Zambia	31.84	
34	3	7	Victoria Russell	Bahamas	32.94	
35	3	8	Tilali Scanlan	American Samoa	33.19	
36	1	5	Jang Myong-gyong	North Korea	33.35	
37	2	8	María José Ribera	Bolivia	33.55	
37	3	1	Cheang Weng Lam	Macau	33.55	
39	3	2	Anahi Schreuders	Aruba	33.90	
40	3	0	Kirsten Fisher-Marsters	Cook Islands	34.45	
41	1	6	Vorleak Sok	Cambodia	34.52	
42	2	1	Darya Semyonova	Turkmenistan	35.33	
43	1	1	Abiola Ogunbanwo	Nigeria	35.36	
44	3	9	Rehema Kalate	Papua New Guinea	36.59	
45	2	4	Taeyanna Adams	Federated States of Micronesia	37.00	
46	1	2	Angelika Ouedraogo	Burkina Faso	37.73	
47	1	8	Ayushma Tuladhar	Nepal	37.91	
48	1	4	Karina Klimyk	Tajikistan	39.48	
49	2	5	Siri Arun Budcharern	Laos	40.40	
50	2	3	Lungelo Nxumalo	Eswatini	41.02	
51	1	3	Nafissath Radji	Benin	41.13	
52	2	2	Wendy Charles	Solomon Islands	43.12	
53	1	0	Roukaya Mahamane	Niger	44.55	
54	2	6	Mariama Touré	Guinea	44.67	
55	1	7	Kanu Isha	Sierra Leone	47.89	
	2	0	Fatoumata Konate	Mali		DNS
	2	7	Safia Houssein Barkat	Djibouti		DNS
	4	4	Molly Hannis	United States		DNS
	2	9	Ida Cham	Gambia		DSQ

=== Semifinals ===
The semifinals were started on 11 December at 19:26.

==== Semifinal 1 ====
Rank	Lane	Name	Nationality	Time	Notes
1	5	Alia Atkinson	Jamaica	29.54	Q
2	3	Jenna Laukkanen	Finland	29.83	Q
3	4	Katie Meili	United States	30.09	Q
4	2	Fanny Lecluyse	Belgium	30.15	Q
5	6	Jessica Hansen	Australia	30.20	QSO
6	8	Feng Junyang	China	30.44	
7	7	Emily Seebohm	Australia	30.45	
8	1	Maria Temnikova	Russia	30.51	

==== Semifinal 2 ====
Rank	Lane	Name	Nationality	Time	Notes
1	5	Martina Carraro	Italy	29.79	Q, NR
2	4	Rūta Meilutytė	Lithuania	29.80	Q
3	3	Ida Hulkko	Finland	30.18	Q
4	6	Miho Teramura	Japan	30.20	QSO, = NR
5	7	Suo Ran	China	30.29	
6	2	Arianna Castiglioni	Italy	30.36	
7	1	Petra Chocová	Czech Republic	30.42	
8	8	Kim Busch	Netherlands	30.79	

==== Swim-off ====
The swim-off was held on 11 December at 21:20.

Rank	Lane	Name	Nationality	Time	Notes
1	4	Jessica Hansen	Australia	29.96	Q
2	5	Miho Teramura	Japan	30.14	NR

=== Final ===
The final was held on 12 December at 19:41.

Rank	Lane	Name	Nationality	Time	Notes
1st place, gold medalist(s)	4	Alia Atkinson	Jamaica	29.05	
2nd place, silver medalist(s)	3	Rūta Meilutytė	Lithuania	29.38	
3rd place, bronze medalist(s)	5	Martina Carraro	Italy	29.59	NR
4	6	Jenna Laukkanen	Finland	29.68	
5	2	Katie Meili	United States	29.89	
6	8	Jessica Hansen	Australia	30.20	
7	7	Fanny Lecluyse	Belgium	30.41	
8	1	Ida Hulkko	Finland	30.45	
