= Swimming at the 2013 SEA Games – Men's 400 metre individual medley =

The men's 400 metre individual medley event at the 2013 SEA Games took place on 12 December 2013 at Wunna Theikdi Aquatics Centre.

There were 12 competitors from 7 countries who took part in this event. Two heats were held. The heat in which a swimmer competed did not formally matter for advancement, as the swimmers with the top eight times from both field qualified for the finals.

== Schedule ==
All times are Myanmar Standard Time (UTC+06:30)

Date	Time	Event
Thursday, 12 December 2013	09:07	Heats
Thursday, 12 December 2013	18:07	Final

== Records ==
Prior to this competition, the existing world, Asian, and Southeast Asian Games records were as follows.

World Record	Michael Phelps (USA)	4:03.84	Beijing, China	10 August 2008
Asian Record	Kosuke Hagino (JPN)	4:07.61	Niigata, Japan	11 April 2013
Games Record	Ratapong Sirisanont (THA)	4:23.20	Hanoi, Vietnam	6 December 2003

== Results ==
=== Heats ===
Rank	Heat	Lane	Athlete	Time	Notes
1	2	3	Nuttapong Ketin (THA)	4:32.26	Q
2	2	4	Quah Zheng Wen (SIN)	4:32.82	Q
3	2	5	Matt Louis Navata (PHI)	4:34.04	Q
4	1	4	Tran Duy Khoi (VIE)	4:34.21	Q
5	1	5	Pang Sheng Jun (SIN)	4:35.56	Q
6	1	6	Lam Quang Nhat (VIE)	4:35.61	Q
7	1	3	Rodrick Luhur (INA)	4:41.06	Q
8	2	2	Satrio Bagaskara Gunadi Putra (INA)	4:43.04	Q
9	1	2	Lee Jeau Zhi Vernon (MAS)	4:44.04	
10	2	6	Jiarapong Sangkhawat (THA)	4:52.04	
11	2	7	Wong Fu Kang (MAS)	5:02.15	
12	1	7	Aung Myo Oo (MYA)	5:09.14	

=== Final ===
Rank	Lane	Athlete	Time	Notes
1st place, gold medalist(s)	5	Quah Zheng Wen (SIN)	4:23.45	
2nd place, silver medalist(s)	4	Nuttapong Ketin (THA)	4:23.63	
3rd place, bronze medalist(s)	6	Tran Duy Khoi (VIE)	4:25.34	NR
4	3	Matt Louis Navata (PHI)	4:30.75	
5	7	Lam Quang Nhat (VIE)	4:34.80	
6	1	Rodrick Luhur (INA)	4:36.22	
6	2	Pang Sheng Jun (SIN)	4:36.22	
8	8	Satrio Bagaskara Gunadi Putra (INA)	4:44.28	
