= I Gede Siman Sudartawa =

Indonesian swimmer (born 1994)

Personal information
- National team: Indonesia
- Born: 8 September 1994 (age 32) Klungkung, Bali, Indonesia
- Height: 175 cm (5 ft 9 in)
- Weight: 65 kg (143 lb)

Sport
- Sport: Swimming
- Strokes: Backstroke
- Club: Millenium Aquatic Swimming Club
- Coach: Albert Sutanto
Medal record
Men's swimming
Representing Indonesia
| Event | 1st | 2nd | 3rd |
|---|---|---|---|
| Asian Championships | 0 | 0 | 1 |
| Islamic Solidarity Games | 4 | 3 | 0 |
| SEA Games | 8 | 6 | 4 |
| Southeast Asian Championships | 6 | 0 | 0 |
| Asian Age Group Championships | 3 | 1 | 1 |
| ASEAN University Games | 15 | 5 | 0 |
| Total | 36 | 15 | 5 |
Asian Championships
| Bronze medal – third place | 2016 Tokyo | 50 m backstroke |
Islamic Solidarity Games
| Gold medal – first place | 2013 Palembang | 50 m backstroke |
| Gold medal – first place | 2013 Palembang | 100 m backstroke |
| Gold medal – first place | 2017 Baku | 50 m backstroke |
| Gold medal – first place | 2017 Baku | 100 m backstroke |
| Silver medal – second place | 2013 Palembang | 200 m backstroke |
| Silver medal – second place | 2013 Palembang | 4x100 m medley |
| Silver medal – second place | 2017 Baku | 4x100 m medley |
SEA Games
| Gold medal – first place | 2011 Jakarta–Palembang | 50 m backstroke |
| Gold medal – first place | 2011 Jakarta–Palembang | 100 m backstroke |
| Gold medal – first place | 2011 Jakarta–Palembang | 200 m backstroke |
| Gold medal – first place | 2011 Jakarta–Palembang | 4x100 m backstroke |
| Gold medal – first place | 2013 Naypyidaw | 100 m backstroke |
| Gold medal – first place | 2017 Kuala Lumpur | 50 m backstroke |
| Gold medal – first place | 2019 Philippines | 50 m backstroke |
| Gold medal – first place | 2023 Cambodia | 50 m backstroke |
| Silver medal – second place | 2013 Naypyidaw | 200 m backstroke |
| Silver medal – second place | 2015 Singapore | 50 m backstroke |
| Silver medal – second place | 2015 Singapore | 100 m backstroke |
| Silver medal – second place | 2015 Singapore | 4x100 m medley |
| Silver medal – second place | 2017 Kuala Lumpur | 100 m backstroke |
| Silver medal – second place | 2017 Kuala Lumpur | 4x100 m medley |
| Bronze medal – third place | 2017 Kuala Lumpur | 4x100 m freestyle |
| Bronze medal – third place | 2019 Philippines | 100 m backstroke |
| Bronze medal – third place | 2021 Vietnam | 50 m backstroke |
| Bronze medal – third place | 2025 Thailand | 50 m backstroke |
Southeast Asian Championships
| Gold medal – first place | 2012 Singapore | 50 m backstroke |
| Gold medal – first place | 2012 Singapore | 100 m backstroke |
| Gold medal – first place | 2012 Singapore | 200 m backstroke |
| Gold medal – first place | 2012 Singapore | 4x100 m medley |
| Gold medal – first place | 2014 Singapore | 50 m backstroke |
| Gold medal – first place | 2014 Singapore | 100 m backstroke |
Asian Age Group Championships
| Gold medal – first place | 2015 Bangkok | 50 m backstroke |
| Gold medal – first place | 2015 Bangkok | 100 m backstroke |
| Gold medal – first place | 2015 Bangkok | 4x100 m medley |
| Silver medal – second place | 2015 Bangkok | 4x100 m freestyle |
| Bronze medal – third place | 2015 Bangkok | Mixed 4x100 m medley |
ASEAN University Games
| Gold medal – first place | 2012 Vientiane | 50 m backstroke |
| Gold medal – first place | 2012 Vientiane | 100 m backstroke |
| Gold medal – first place | 2012 Vientiane | 4x100 m medley |
| Gold medal – first place | 2014 Palembang | 50 m backstroke |
| Gold medal – first place | 2014 Palembang | 100 m backstroke |
| Gold medal – first place | 2014 Palembang | 200 m backstroke |
| Gold medal – first place | 2014 Palembang | 4x100 m freestyle |
| Gold medal – first place | 2014 Palembang | 4x100 m medley |
| Gold medal – first place | 2016 Singapore | 50 m backstroke |
| Gold medal – first place | 2016 Singapore | 100 m backstroke |
| Gold medal – first place | 2016 Singapore | 4x100 m freestyle |
| Gold medal – first place | 2016 Singapore | 4x100 m medley |
| Gold medal – first place | 2018 Naypyidaw | 50 m backstroke |
| Gold medal – first place | 2018 Naypyidaw | 100 m backstroke |
| Gold medal – first place | 2018 Naypyidaw | 4x100 m medley |
| Silver medal – second place | 2016 Singapore | 200 m backstroke |
| Silver medal – second place | 2016 Singapore | 4x200 m freestyle |
| Silver medal – second place | 2018 Naypyidaw | 50 m butterfly |
| Silver medal – second place | 2018 Naypyidaw | 4x100 m freestyle |
| Silver medal – second place | 2018 Naypyidaw | 4x200 m freestyle |

I Gede Siman Sudartawa (born 8 September 1994) is an Indonesian swimmer. He specializes in backstroke. In the 2011 SEA Games, he won four gold medals and set 2 SEA Games' records.

In 2012 Summer Olympic, he was qualified as rank 39. He was also the flag bearer for 2012 in opening ceremony. He became the first Indonesian swimmer to swim in World Aquatics Championships semifinal after he finished sixteenth overall in 50 metre backstroke at the 2017 World Aquatics Championships held in Budapest, Hungary.

Olympic Games
| Preceded by Oka Sulaksana | Flagbearer for Indonesia; London 2012 | Succeeded by Maria Natalia Londa |
