= Swimming at the 2025 SEA Games – Men's 50 metre backstroke =

Men's 50 metre backstroke at the 2025 SEA Games
- Venue: SAT Swimming Pool
- Date: 11 December
- Competitors: 14 from 9 nations
- Winning time: 25.36

Medalists
| gold medal | Jason Yusuf | Indonesia |
| silver medal | Quah Zheng Wen | Singapore |
| bronze medal | I Gede Siman Sudartawa | Indonesia |

The men's 50 metre backstroke event at the 2025 SEA Games took place on 11 December 2025 at the SAT Swimming Pool in Bangkok, Thailand.

== Schedule ==
All times are Indochina Standard Time (UTC+07:00)

| Date | Time | Event |
|---|---|---|
| Thursday, 11 December 2025 | 9:00 | Heats |
| Thursday, 11 December 2025 | 18:00 | Final |

== Records ==
Prior to this competition, the existing world, Asian and Games records were as follows.

| World Record | Kliment Kolesnikov (RUS) | 23.55 | Kazan, Russia | 18 December 2009 |
| Asian Record | Junya Koga (JPN) | 24.24 | Rome, Italy | 7 April 2019 |
| Games Record | I Gede Siman Sudartawa (INA) | 25.12 | New Clark City, Philippines | 7 December 2019 |

== Results ==
=== Heats ===
| Rank | Heat | Lane | Swimmer | Nationality | Time | Notes |
|---|---|---|---|---|---|---|
| 1 | 2 | 4 | Quah Zheng Wen | Singapore | 25.35 | Q |
| 2 | 1 | 4 | Jason Yusuf | Indonesia | 25.88 | Q |
| 3 | 1 | 5 | Tedd Windsor Chan | Singapore | 26.05 | Q |
| 4 | 1 | 3 | Logan Noguchi | Philippines | 26.25 | Q |
| 5 | 2 | 6 | Joran Orogo | Philippines | 26.32 | Q |
| 6 | 2 | 5 | I Gede Siman Sudartawa | Indonesia | 26.40 | Q |
| 7 | 2 | 3 | Tonnam Kanteemool | Thailand | 26.46 | Q |
| 8 | 1 | 6 | Geargchai Rutnosot | Thailand | 26.69 | Q |
| 9 | 1 | 2 | Trịnh Trường Vinh | Vietnam | 26.73 | R |
| 10 | 2 | 2 | Daniel Scott Williams | Malaysia | 26.91 | R |
| 11 | 1 | 7 | Han Paing Htoo | Myanmar | 31.68 | |
| 12 | 2 | 7 | Jirasak Khammavongkeo | Laos | 31.96 | |

=== Final ===
| Rank | Lane | Swimmer | Nationality | Time | Notes |
|---|---|---|---|---|---|
| 1st place, gold medalist(s) | 5 | Jason Yusuf | Indonesia | 25.36 | |
| 2nd place, silver medalist(s) | 4 | Quah Zheng Wen | Singapore | 25.43 | |
| 3rd place, bronze medalist(s) | 2 | I Gede Siman Sudartawa | Indonesia | 25.49 | |
| 4 | 3 | Tedd Windsor Chan | Singapore | 25.56 | |
| 5 | 6 | Joran Orogo | Philippines | 26.22 | |
| 6 | 1 | Geargchai Rutnosot | Thailand | 26.31 | |
| 7 | 7 | Tonnam Kanteemool | Thailand | 26.34 | |
| 8 | 8 | Trịnh Trường Vinh | Vietnam | 27.39 | |
