= Swimming at the 2013 SEA Games – Women's 200 metre individual medley =

The Women's 200 metre individual medley event at the 2013 SEA Games took place on 12 December 2013 at Wunna Theikdi Aquatics Centre.

There were 11 competitors from 7 countries who took part in this event. Two heats were held. The heat in which a swimmer competed did not formally matter for advancement, as the swimmers with the top eight times from both field qualified for the finals.

== Schedule ==
All times are Myanmar Standard Time (UTC+06:30)

Date	Time	Event
Thursday, 12 December 2013	09:00	Heats
Thursday, 12 December 2013	18:00	Final

== Records ==
Prior to this competition, the existing world, Asian, and Southeast Asian Games records were as follows.

World Record	Ariana Kukors (USA)	2:06.15	Rome, Italy	27 July 2009
Asian Record	Ye Shiwen (CHN)	2:07.57	London, United Kingdom	31 July 2012
Games Record	Siow Yi Ting (MAS)	2:14.57	Vientiane, Laos	10 December 2009

== Results ==
=== Heats ===
Rank	Heat	Lane	Athlete	Time	Notes
1	2	4	Nguyen Thi Anh Vien (VIE)	2:21.55	Q
2	2	3	Ressa Kania Dewi (INA)	2:22.31	Q
3	1	4	Phiangkhwan Pawapotako (THA)	2:22.81	Q
4	2	6	Meagan Lim (SIN)	2:22.97	Q
5	1	5	Nguyen Thi Kim Tuyen (VIE)	2:25.36	Q
6	1	3	Erika Kong (MAS)	2:25.50	Q
7	2	2	Nadia Adrianna Redza Goh (MAS)	2:26.53	Q
8	2	5	Samantha Yeo (SIN)	2:26.64	Q
9	1	2	Su Moe Theint San (MYA)	2:36.19	
10	2	7	Khant Khant Su San (MYA)	2:39.86	
-	1	6	Hannah Dato (PHI)	DNS	

=== Final ===
Rank	Lane	Athlete	Time	Notes
1st place, gold medalist(s)	4	Nguyen Thi Anh Vien (VIE)	2:16.20	
2nd place, silver medalist(s)	3	Phiangkhwan Pawapotako (THA)	2:17.59	
3rd place, bronze medalist(s)	6	Meagan Lim (SIN)	2:20.38	
4	5	Ressa Kania Dewi (INA)	2:20.51	
5	2	Nguyen Thi Kim Tuyen (VIE)	2:20.72	
6	8	Samantha Yeo (SIN)	2:22.51	
7	7	Erika Kong (MAS)	2:23.97	
8	1	Nadia Adrianna Redza Goh (MAS)	2:26.07	
