= Swimming at the 2013 SEA Games – Men's 200 metre backstroke =

The Men's 200 metre backstroke event at the 2013 SEA Games took place on 12 December 2013 at Wunna Theikdi Aquatics Centre.

There were 10 competitors from 7 countries who took part in this event. Two heats were held. The heat in which a swimmer competed did not formally matter for advancement, as the swimmers with the top eight times from both fields qualified for the finals.

== Schedule ==
All times are Myanmar Standard Time (UTC+06:30)

Date	Time	Event
Thursday, 12 December 2013	09:21	Heats
Thursday, 12 December 2013	18:28	Final

== Records ==
Prior to this competition, the existing world, Asian, and Southeast Asian Games records were as follows.

World Record	Aaron Peirsol (USA)	1:51.92	Rome, Italy	31 July 2009
Asian Record	Ryosuke Irie (JPN)	1:52.51	Rome, Italy	31 July 2009
Games Record	Raymond Papa (PHI)	2:00.96	Jakarta, Indonesia	12 October 1997

== Results ==
=== Heats ===
Rank	Heat	Lane	Athlete	Time	Notes
1	2	3	Tern Jian Han (MAS)	2:08.94	Q
2	2	4	Quah Zheng Wen (SIN)	2:12.95	Q
3	1	5	Wei Shien Zach Ong (SIN)	2:13.21	Q
4	2	5	I Gede Siman Sudartawa (INA)	2:13.38	Q
5	1	4	Ricky Anggawijaya (INA)	2:14.10	Q
6	1	3	Kasipat Chograthin (THA)	2:14.87	Q
7	1	6	Phan Lam Yen (VIE)	2:18.50	Q
8	2	2	Phan Gia Man (VIE)	2:18.53	Q
9	1	2	Ahnt Khaung Htut (MYA)	2:37.87	
-	2	6	Fahad Al-Khaldi (PHI)	DNS	

=== Final ===
Rank	Lane	Athlete	Time	Notes
1st place, gold medalist(s)	2	Ricky Anggawijaya (INA)	2:03.44	
2nd place, silver medalist(s)	6	I Gede Siman Sudartawa (INA)	2:04.10	
3rd place, bronze medalist(s)	3	Wei Shien Zach Ong (SIN)	2:05.38	
4	5	Quah Zheng Wen (SIN)	2:07.28	
5	4	Tern Jian Han (MAS)	2:07.89	
6	7	Kasipat Chograthin (THA)	2:12.49	
7	1	Phan Lam Yen (VIE)	2:18.16	
8	8	Phan Gia Man (VIE)	2:20.19	
