= Swimming at the 2017 SEA Games – Men's 50 metre backstroke =

Swimming – Men's 50 metre backstroke at the 2017 SEA Games
- Venue: National Aquatic Centre
- Date: 21 August 2017
- Competitors: 12 from 6 nations

Medalists
gold medal	I Gede Siman Sudartawa	Indonesia
silver medal	Quah Zheng Wen	Singapore
bronze medal	Lê Nguyễn Paul	Vietnam

The men's 50 metre backstroke competition of the swimming event at the 2017 SEA Games was held on 21 August at the National Aquatic Centre in Kuala Lumpur, Malaysia.

== Records ==
Prior to this competition, the existing Asian and Games records were as follows:

Asian Record	Junya Koga (JPN)	24.24	Rome, Italy	2 August 2009
Games Record	Quah Zheng Wen (SIN)	25.20	Singapore, Singapore	11 June 2015

The following records were established during the competition:

Date	Event	Name	Nationality	Time	Record
21 August	Final	I Gede Siman Sudartawa	Indonesia (INA)	25.20	GR

== Schedule ==
All times are Malaysia Standard Time (UTC+08:00)

Date	Time	Event
Monday, 21 August 2017	09:00	Heat 1
Monday, 21 August 2017	09:00	Heat 2
Monday, 21 August 2017	19:00	Final

== Results ==
=== Heats ===
The heats were held on 21 August.

==== Heat 1 ====
Source: Heat 1 results

Rank	Lane	Athletes	Time	Notes
1	7	Quah Zheng Wen (SGP)	25.91	Q
2	5	Trần Duy Khôi (VIE)	26.30	Q
3	4	Francis Fong (SGP)	26.39	Q
4	3	Tern Jian Han (MAS)	26.62	Q
5	6	Cheng Pirort (CAM)	31.26	
6	2	Pathana Inthavong (LAO)	32.52	

==== Heat 2 ====
Source: Heat 2 results

Rank	Lane	Athletes	Time	Notes
1	4	I Gede Siman Sudartawa (INA)	25.53	Q
3	7	Lê Nguyễn Paul (VIE)	25.75	Q
2	5	Kasipat Chograthin (THA)	26.49	Q
4	3	Ricky Anggawidjaja (INA)	26.77	Q
5	6	Jordan Yip (MAS)	27.61	
6	2	Lim Keoudom (CAM)	30.50	

=== Final ===
Source: Final Results

The final was held on 21 August.

Rank	Lane	Athletes	Time	Notes
1st place, gold medalist(s)	4	I Gede Siman Sudartawa (INA)	25.20	GR
2nd place, silver medalist(s)	3	Quah Zheng Wen (SGP)	25.39	
3rd place, bronze medalist(s)	5	Lê Nguyễn Paul (VIE)	25.82	
4	6	Trần Duy Khôi (VIE)	25.90	
5	2	Francis Fong (SGP)	26.10	
6	7	Kasipat Chograthin (THA)	26.26	
7	1	Tern Jian Han (MAS)	26.38	
8	8	Ricky Anggawidjaja (INA)	26.49	
