= Swimming at the 2013 SEA Games – Women's 200 metre breaststroke =

The Women's 200 metre breaststroke event at the 2013 SEA Games took place on 15 December 2013 at Wunna Theikdi Aquatics Centre.

There were 10 competitors from 6 countries who took part in this event. Two heats were held. The heat in which a swimmer competed did not formally matter for advancement, as the swimmers with the top eight times from both field qualified for the finals.

== Schedule ==
All times are Myanmar Standard Time (UTC+06:30)

| Date | Time | Event |
|---|---|---|
| Thursday, 15 December 2013 | 09:02 | Heats |
| Thursday, 15 December 2013 | 18:06 | Final |

== Records ==
Prior to this competition, the existing world, Asian, and Southeast Asian Games records were as follows.

| World Record | Rikke Møller Pedersen (DEN) | 2:19.11 | Barcelona, Spain | 1 August 2013 |
| Asian Record | Satomi Suzuki (JPN) | 2:20.72 | London, United Kingdom | 2 August 2012 |
| Games Record | Siow Yi Ting (MAS) | 2:30.35 | Vientiane, Laos | 13 December 2009 |

== Results ==
=== Heats ===
| Rank | Heat | Lane | Athlete | Time | Notes |
|---|---|---|---|---|---|
| 1 | 2 | 3 | Chavunnooch Salubluek (THA) | 2:39.11 | Q |
| 2 | 1 | 4 | Christina Loh (MAS) | 2:40.10 | Q |
| 3 | 2 | 4 | Samantha Yeo (SIN) | 2:40.83 | Q |
| 4 | 2 | 5 | Phiangkhwan Pawapotako (THA) | 2:41.65 | Q |
| 5 | 1 | 5 | Nadia Adrianna Redza Goh (MAS) | 2:42.82 | Q |
| 6 | 2 | 6 | Kavita Chrishna Sulistyaning (INA) | 2:46.64 | Q |
| 7 | 1 | 3 | Cheryl Lim (SIN) | 2:46.85 | Q |
| 8 | 1 | 6 | Ngo Thi Ngoc Quynh (VIE) | 2:48.40 | Q |
| 9 | 2 | 2 | Su Moe Theint San (MYA) | 2:54.81 | |
| 10 | 1 | 2 | Ingyin Kay Khine (MYA) | 3:11.68 | |

=== Final ===
| Rank | Lane | Athlete | Time | Notes |
|---|---|---|---|---|
| 1st place, gold medalist(s) | 5 | Christina Loh (MAS) | 2:32.56 | |
| 2nd place, silver medalist(s) | 4 | Chavunnooch Salubluek (THA) | 2:34.21 | |
| 3rd place, bronze medalist(s) | 3 | Samantha Yeo (SIN) | 2:34.27 | |
| 4 | 6 | Phiangkhwan Pawapotako (THA) | 2:34.58 | |
| 5 | 2 | Nadia Adrianna Redza Goh (MAS) | 2:39.10 | |
| 6 | 1 | Cheryl Lim (SIN) | 2:41.43 | |
| 7 | 7 | Kavita Chrishna Sulistyaning (INA) | 2:42.26 | |
| 8 | 8 | Ngo Thi Ngoc Quynh (VIE) | 2:46.06 | |
