= 2012 Southeast Asian Swimming Championships =

International swimming competition

Swimming at the 2012 Southeast Asian Swimming Championships was held 13–17 June in Singapore. It consisted of 38 events, swum in a long course (50m) pool.

== Swimming Results ==
=== Men's events ===
Event	Gold		Silver		Bronze	
50m Freestyle details	Triady Fauzi Sidiq; Indonesia	23.17; CR	Russell Ong; Singapore	23.19	Hoang Quy Phuoc; Vietnam	23.38
100m Freestyle details	Danny Yeo; Singapore	50.66	Hoang Quy Phuoc; Vietnam	50.80	Triady Fauzi Sidiq; Indonesia	51.11
200m Freestyle details	Danny Yeo; Singapore	1:50.71	Lim Ching Hwan; Malaysia	1:52.18	Daniel Bego; Malaysia	1:52.44
400m Freestyle details	Kevin Yeap; Malaysia	3:54.19; CR	Vernon Lee; Malaysia	4:00.40	Jeremy Kevin Mathews; Singapore	4:01.55
1500m Freestyle details	Kevin Yeap; Malaysia	15:35.02; CR	Teo Zhen Ren; Singapore	15:43.08	Vernon Lee; Malaysia	15:54.41
50m backstroke details	I Gede Siman Sudartawa; Indonesia	25.67; CR	Glenn Victor Sutanto; Indonesia	26.29	Quah Zheng Wen; Singapore	26.58
100m Backstroke details	I Gede Siman Sudartawa; Indonesia	55.32; CR	Quah Zheng Wen; Singapore	56.84	Rainer Ng Kai Wee; Singapore	57.94
200m Backstroke details	I Gede Siman Sudartawa; Indonesia	2:03.87; CR	Quah Zheng Wen; Singapore	2:03.96	Rainer Ng Kai Wee; Singapore	2:06.65
50m breaststroke details	Lionel Khoo; Singapore	28.75; CR	Parker Lam; Singapore	29.05	Nicko Biondi Ricardo; Indonesia	29.16
100m Breaststroke details	Lionel Khoo; Singapore	1:02.79; CR	Yap See Tuan; Malaysia	1:03.67	Dennis J. Tiwa; Indonesia	1:04.48
200m Breaststroke details	Yap See Tuan; Malaysia	2:15.96; CR	Muhammad Idham Dasuki; Indonesia	2:18.68	Lionel Khoo; Singapore	2:19.02
50m butterfly details	Glenn Victor Sutanto; Indonesia	24.56; CR	Guntur Putra Pratama; Indonesia	25.04	Hoang Quy Phuoc; Vietnam	25.28
100m Butterfly details	Glenn Victor Sutanto; Indonesia	53.19; CR	Hoang Quy Phuoc; Vietnam	54.13	Triady Fauzi; Indonesia	54.27
200m Butterfly details	Quah Zheng Wen; Singapore	1:59.22; CR	Triady Fauzi Sidiq; Indonesia	2:03.23	Rainer Ng Kai Wee; Singapore	2:04.46
200m I.M. details	Quah Zheng Wen; Singapore	2:03.79; CR	Jeremy Kevin Mathews; Singapore	2:04.09	Ian James Barr; Malaysia	2:07.14
400m I.M. details	Quah Zheng Wen; Singapore	4:27.62; CR	Jeremy Kevin Mathews; Singapore	4:28.23	Ryan Arabejo; Philippines	4:35.09
4×100m Freestyle Relay details	Indonesia; Triady Fauzi Sidiq (51.04); Alexis Wijaya Ohmar (51.51); Glenn Victor Sutanto (51.40); Guntur Pratama (51.77)	3:25.72; CR	Singapore; Danny Yeo (50.60) CR; Russell Ong (51.33); Pang Sheng Jun (52.81); Rainer Ng Kai Wee (52.11)	3:26.85	Malaysia; Lim Ching Hwang (51.16); Ian James Barr (52.56); Tern Jian Han (53.35); Vernon Lee (55.44)	3:32.51
4×200m Freestyle Relay details	Singapore; Danny Yeo (1:50.54) CR; Teo Zhen Ren (1:53.19); Pang Sheng Jun (1:53.98); Jeremy Kevin Mathews (1:53.08)	7:30.79; CR	Malaysia; Lim Ching Hwang (1:54.06); Daniel Bego (1:53.91); Vernon Lee (1:53.87); Kevin Yeap (1:53.28)	7:35.12	Indonesia; Triady Fauzi Sidiq (1:52.33); Alexis Wijaya Ohmar (1:54.15); Rodrick Luhur (1:57.21); Muhammad Idham Dasuki (1:58.22)	7:41.91
4×100m Medley Relay details	Indonesia; I Gede Siman Sudartawa (55.39); Dennis J. Tiwa (1:04.07); Glenn Victor Sutanto (53.95); Triady Fauzi Sidiq (51.58)	3:44.99; CR	Singapore; Quah Zheng Wen (57.64); Lionel Khoo (1:02.67); Jerryl Yong (56.30); Rainer Ng Kai Wee (52.73)	3:49.34	Malaysia; Tern Jian Han (58.56); Ian James Barr (1:06.79); Chi Chia Kian (58.74); Lim Ching Hwang (53.76)	3:57.85

=== Women's events ===
Event	Gold		Silver		Bronze	
50m Freestyle details	Amanda Lim; Singapore	25.71; CR	Mylene Ong; Singapore	25.86	Jenjira Srisa-ard; Thailand	26.27
100m Freestyle details	Mylene Ong; Singapore	56.02; CR	Jenjira Srisa-ard; Thailand	57.17	Jasmine Alkhaldi; Philippines	57.44
200m Freestyle details	Amanda Lim; Singapore	2:02.76; CR	Khoo Cai Lin; Malaysia	2:03.89	Koh Hui Yu; Singapore	2:04.22
400m Freestyle details	Khoo Cai Lin; Malaysia	4:19.06; CR	Raina Saumi Grahana; Indonesia	4:20.16	Benjaporn Sriphanomthorn; Thailand	4:24.12
800m Freestyle details	Khoo Cai Lin; Malaysia	8:52.45; CR	Raina Saumi Grahana; Indonesia	9:00.47	Benjaporn Sriphanomthorn; Thailand	9:11.46
50m backstroke details	Nguyen Thi Anh Vien; Vietnam	29.89; CR	Lynette Ng; Singapore	30.70	Chui Lai Kwan; Malaysia	30.93
100m Backstroke details	Nguyen Thi Anh Vien; Vietnam	1:02.70; CR	Shana Lim; Singapore	1:03.24	Yessy Yosaputra; Indonesia	1:05.62
200m Backstroke details	Nguyen Thi Anh Vien; Vietnam	2:13.84; CR	Yessy Yosaputra; Indonesia	2:19.43	Teo Jing Wen; Singapore	2:22.70
50m breaststroke details	Christina Loh; Malaysia	33.16; CR	Siow Yi Ting; Malaysia	33.21	Samantha Yeo; Singapore	33.66
100m Breaststroke details	Siow Yi Ting; Malaysia	1:10.66; CR	Christina Loh; Malaysia	1:11.38	Chavunnooch Salubluek; Thailand	1:11.54
200m Breaststroke details	Siow Yi Ting; Malaysia	2:31.75; CR	Chavunnooch Salubluek; Thailand	2:34.09	Cheryl Lim; Singapore	2:34.79
50m butterfly details	Mylene Ong; Singapore	27.72; CR	Jasmine Alkhaldi; Philippines	28.02	Marellyn Liew; Malaysia	28.30
100m Butterfly details	Tao Li; Singapore	59.23; CR	Nguyen Thi Kim Tuyen; Vietnam	1:01.30	Meagan Lim; Singapore	1:02.56
200m Butterfly details	Monaliza Arieswati; Indonesia	2:16.25; CR	Hii Siew Siew; Malaysia	2:16.45	Raina Saumi Grahana; Indonesia	2:16.74
200m I.M. details	Nguyen Thi Anh Vien; Vietnam	2:17.67; CR	Phiangkhwan Pawapotako; Thailand	2:19.04	Samantha Yeo; Singapore	2:20.72
400m I.M. details	Nguyen Thi Anh Vien; Vietnam	4:50.27; CR	Erika Kong; Malaysia	4:59.19	Ressa Kania Dewi; Indonesia	5:02.06
4×100m Freestyle Relay details	Singapore; Mylene Ong (57.29); Koh Hui Yu (56.87); Amanda Lim (56.83); Teo Jing Wen (58.26)	3:49.25; CR	Indonesia; Enny Susilawati Margono (57.64); Patricia Yosita Hapsari (56.64); Raina Saumi Grahana (59.12); Ressa Kania Dewi (59.32)	3:52.72	Malaysia; Erika Kong (1:00.87); Marellyn Liew (1:04.98); Hii Siew Siew (1:00.67); Khoo Cai Lin (1:03.00)	4:09.52
4×200m Freestyle Relay details	Singapore; Koh Hui Yu (2:04.49); Amanda Lim (2:04.00); Teo Jing Wen (2:05.96); Marina Chan (2:07.22)	8:21.67; CR	Indonesia; Enny Susilawati Margono (2:08.92); Raina Saumi Grahana (2:07.46); Ressa Kania Dewi (2:07.06); Patricia Yosita Hapsari (2:08.93)	8:32.37	not awarded	
4×100m Medley Relay details	Singapore; Shana Lim (1:03.47); Samantha Yeo (1:11.79); Tao Li (1:03.66); Mylene Ong (59.07)	4:17.99; CR	not awarded		not awarded	

== Swimming Medals ==
Rank	Nation	Gold	Silver	Bronze	Total
1	Singapore	16	12	12	40
2	Indonesia	9	9	8	26
3	Malaysia	8	9	8	25
4	Vietnam	5	3	2	10
5	Thailand	0	3	4	7
6	Philippines	0	1	2	3
Totals (6 entries)		38	37	36	111

== Diving ==
20 divers competed from Singapore and Malaysia and Indonesia in 8 events. Team Singapore took away 3 silver and 3 bronze medals from this competition.
