= Feng Junyang =

Chinese swimmer (born 1998)

Personal information
- Nationality: Chinese
- Born: 29 December 1998 (age 27)

Sport
- Sport: Swimming
Medal record
Representing China
Asian Games
Bronze medal – third place	2018 Hangzhou	50m breaststroke

Feng Junyang (born 29 December 1998) is a Chinese swimmer. She competed in the women's 50 metre breaststroke event at the 2018 FINA World Swimming Championships (25 m), in Hangzhou, China.
