= Pang Sheng Jun =

Singaporean former national swimmer (born 1992)

Personal information
- Full name: Pang Sheng Jun
- Nickname: PSJ
- National team: Singapore
- Born: 4 September 1992 (age 34) Singapore
- Height: 1.73 m (5 ft 8 in)
- Weight: 73 kg (161 lb)

Sport
- Sport: Swimming
- Strokes: Freestyle, Individual Medley
Medal record
Men's swimming
Representing Singapore
Event	1st	2nd	3rd
FINA Swimming World Cup	0	0	1
Southeast Asian Swimming Championships	2	0	3
Southeast Asian Games	3	2	2
Asian Games	0	0	1
ASEAN University Games	2	0	0
Total	7	2	7
FINA Swimming World Cup
Bronze medal – third place	2011 Singapore	1500 m freestyle
Southeast Asian Swimming Championships
Gold medal – first place	2012 Singapore	4x200 m freestyle relay
Gold medal – first place	2014 Singapore	4x200 m freestyle relay
Bronze medal – third place	2014 Singapore	200 m individual medley
Bronze medal – third place	2014 Singapore	400 m individual medley
Bronze medal – third place	2014 Singapore	400 m freestyle
Southeast Asian Games
Gold medal – first place	2013 Myanmar	4x200 m freestyle relay
Gold medal – first place	2015 Singapore	4x200 m freestyle relay
Gold medal – first place	2017 Malaysia	4x200 m freestyle relay
Silver medal – second place	2015 Singapore	400 m individual medley
Silver medal – second place	2017 Malaysia	200 m individual medley
Bronze medal – third place	2015 Singapore	400 m freestyle
Bronze medal – third place	2017 Malaysia	400 m individual medley
Asian Games
Bronze medal – third place	2014 South Korea	4x200 m freestyle relay
ASEAN University Games
Gold medal – first place	2016 Singapore	400 m freestyle
Gold medal – first place	2016 Singapore	400 m individual medley

Pang Sheng Jun (born 4 September 1992) is a Singaporean former national swimmer.

== Early life and education ==
Pang started swimming from the age of four upon doctor's recommendation due to his asthma. He began competitive swimming at six years old.

In 2014, he received an Outstanding Sports Achievement Award for swimming from the Singapore Sports School. He studied Sports Science and Management at the Nanyang Technological University.

== Career ==
At the 2009 Southeast Asian Games (SEA Games) in Laos, Pang finished fourth in the men's 200m and 400m individual medleys.

Pang participated at the 400m freestyle event, his only event, at the 2011 SEA Games. He finished fifth at the finals. Disappointed at his poor showing, Pang attempted suicide by attempting leaping off the highest floor of his apartment building at the Games Village but was held back by his teammate and friend, Russell Ong.

Pang won his first medal at the FINA Swimming World Cup with a bronze medal in the 1,500m freestyle event.

At the 2012 Southeast Asian Swimming Championships, he won the gold medal at the men's 4 × 200 m freestyle.

At the 2013 SEA Games, he won the gold medal at the men's 4 × 200 m freestyle.

At the 2014 Southeast Asian Swimming Championships, he won the gold medal at the men's 4 × 200 m freestyle again, and bronze medals in the 200m and 400m freestyle events and the 400m individual medley event .

At the 2015 SEA Games, he won the gold medal at the men's 4 × 200 m freestyle again and broke the national record. He also won the silver medal in the 400m individual medley event and the bronze medal in 400m freestyle event, his first individual medals in the SEA Games.

Pang failed to qualify for the 2016 Summer Olympics after achieving Olympic 'B' times in the 400m individual medley and freestyle.

== Personal life ==
Pang is the youngest son of Agnes Ng and Pang Boon Teng. He has two sisters who swam competitively until they were 16 years old when they decided to focus on their studies instead. He married badminton player Yeo Jia Min on 20 June 2026.
