= Swimming at the 2013 SEA Games – Women's 200 metre backstroke =

The Women's 200 metre backstroke event at the 2013 SEA Games took place on 12 December 2013 at Wunna Theikdi Aquatics Centre.

There were 6 competitors from 4 countries who took part in this event. No Qualification was held since only 6 swimmers competed.

== Schedule ==
All times are Myanmar Standard Time (UTC+06:30)

Date	Time	Event
Thursday, 12 December 2013	18:46	Final

== Records ==
Prior to this competition, the existing world, Asian, and Southeast Asian Games records were as follows.

World Record	Missy Franklin (USA)	2:04.06	London, United Kingdom	3 August 2012
Asian Record	Zhao Jing (CHN)	2:06.46	Guangzhou, China	14 November 2010
Games Record	Yessy Venesia Yosaputra (INA)	2:15.73	Palembang, Indonesia	13 November 2011

== Results ==
=== Final ===
Rank	Lane	Athlete	Time	Notes
1st place, gold medalist(s)	4	Nguyen Thi Anh Vien (VIE)	2:14.80	GR
2nd place, silver medalist(s)	5	Yessy Venesia Yosaputra (INA)	2:20.35	
3rd place, bronze medalist(s)	6	Meagan Lim (SIN)	2:21.19	
4	3	Teo Jing Wen (SIN)	2:22.43	
5	2	Nurul Fajar Fitriyati (INA)	2:22.69	
6	7	Nang Kham Myat Chu (MYA)	2:43.82	
