= Suo Ran =

Chinese swimmer

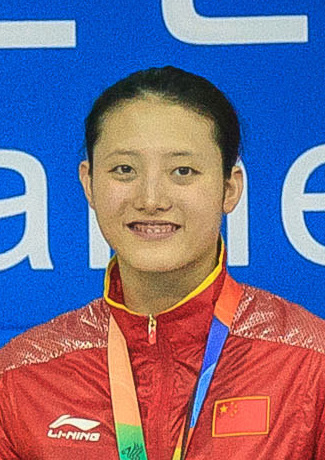
- Suo at the 2015 Military World Games

Personal information
- Born: 19 August 1994 (age 31)
- Height: 178 cm (5 ft 10 in)
- Weight: 67 kg (148 lb)

Sport
- Sport: Swimming
- Strokes: Freestyle, breaststroke
Medal record
Representing China
World Championships (SC)
Silver medal – second place	2018 Hangzhou	4×50 m medley
Asian Games
Silver medal – second place	2014 Incheon	50 m breaststroke
Military World Games
Bronze medal – third place	2015 Mungyeong	50 m freestyle

Suo Ran (索冉, born 19 August 1994) is a Chinese swimmer who won a silver medal in the 50 breaststroke at the 2014 Asian Games.
