= Roanne Ho =

Singaporean swimmer (born 1992)

Personal information
- Born: 27 October 1992 (age 34) Singapore

Sport
- Sport: Swimming
Medal record
Women's swimming
Representing Singapore
Asian Games
Silver medal – second place	2018 Jakarta	50 m breaststroke

Roanne Ho (born 27 October 1992) is a retired Singaporean swimmer. In 2018, she won the silver medal in the women's 50 metre breaststroke event at the 2018 Asian Games held in Jakarta, Indonesia. She also competed in the women's 100 metre breaststroke event.

In 2018, she also competed in the women's 50 metre breaststroke and women's 100 metre breaststroke events at the 2018 Commonwealth Games held in Gold Coast, Australia.

She announced her retirement from competitive swimming in February 2019.
