= 2014 Southeast Asian Swimming Championships =

International swimming competition

Swimming at the 2014 Southeast Asian Swimming Championships was held 14–24 June in Singapore. It consisted of 41 events, swum in a long course (50m) pool. 4 disciplines of swimming, diving, water polo and synchronised swimming, with over 200 participants from 7 countries.

== Swimming Medals ==
Medals:

Rank	Nation	Gold	Silver	Bronze	Total
1	Vietnam (VIE)	12	4	4	20
2	Singapore (SIN)	11	15	12	38
3	Thailand (THA)	8	9	12	29
4	Indonesia (INA)	7	11	5	23
5	Malaysia (MAS)	0	0	2	2
6	Brunei (BRU)	0	0	0	0
6	Philippines (PHI)	0	0	0	0
Totals (7 entries)		38	39	35	112

== Diving Medals ==
Rank	Nation	Gold	Silver	Bronze	Total
1	Singapore (SIN)	3	6	2	11
2	Malaysia (MAS)	3	0	1	4
3	Indonesia (INA)	2	2	0	4
4	Philippines (PHI)	1	1	4	6
Totals (4 entries)		9	9	7	25

== Waterpolo Medals ==
Rank	Nation	Gold	Silver	Bronze	Total
1	Singapore (SIN)	2	0	0	2
2	Malaysia (MAS)	0	1	1	2
3	Thailand (THA)	0	1	0	1
Totals (3 entries)		2	2	1	5

1. Men's U23 : Singapore / Malaysia
2. Women's : Singapore / Thailand/ Malaysia

== Synchronised swimming ==
Rank	Nation	Gold	Silver	Bronze	Total
1	Singapore (SIN)	4	1	0	5
Totals (1 entries)		4	1	0	5
