= Southeast Asian Swimming Championships =

Swimming Championship

- Status: active
- Genre: sporting event
- Date: mid-year
- Frequency: annual / biennial
- Country: varying
- Inaugurated: 1977 / 2012 / 2019
- Organiser: SEASF

The Southeast Asian Swimming Championships are a biennial aquatics championships for countries from Southeast Asia organised by South East Asian Swimming Federation (SEASF). These championships include competition in Swimming, Diving, Synchronized Swimming (synchro), and Water Polo. The first edition of these championships were the aquatics competitions at the 2012 Southeast Asian Swimming Championships held in June 2012 in Singapore. Championships among masters began 2019.

== SEA Seniors Championships ==
SEA Seniors Championships:

Year	Number	Host city	Host country	Events
2012	1	Singapore	Singapore	38
2014	2	Singapore	Singapore	38

== SEA Masters Championships ==
SEA Masters Championships:

Year	Number	Host city	Host country	Events
2019	1	Jakarta	Indonesia	

== SEA Age Groups Championships ==
SEA Age Group Championships: Ages:

- 11 - 13 Boys and Girls
- 13 - 15 Boys and Girls
- 15 - 17 Boys and Girls

Year	Number	Host city	Host country	Events
1977	1			
1978	2			
1979	3			
1980	4			
1981	5			
1982	6			
1983	7			
1984	8			
1985	9			
1986	10			
1987	11			
1988	12			
1989	13			
1990	14			
1991	15			
1992	16	Bandar Seri Begawan	Brunei	
1993	17			
1994	18			
1995	19			
1996	20			
1997	21			
1998	22			
1999	23	Singapore	Singapore	
2000	24	Bali	Indonesia	
2001	25			

Year	Number	Host city	Host country	Events
2002	26	Bangkok	Thailand	94
2003	27	San Pablo, Laguna	Philippines	94
2004	28	Danang	Vietnam	94
2005	29	Bandar Seri Begawan	Brunei	94
2006	30	Jakarta	Indonesia	96
2007	31	Singapore	Singapore	96
2008	32	Bangkok	Thailand	96
2009	33	Kuala Lumpur	Malaysia	96
2010	34	San Pablo, Laguna	Philippines	102
2011	35	Danang	Vietnam	102
2012	36	Palembang	Indonesia	102
2013	37	Bandar Seri Begawan	Brunei	102
2014	38	Singapore	Singapore	102
2015	39	Danang	Vietnam	105
2016	40	Bangkok	Thailand	105
2017	41	Bandar Seri Begawan	Brunei	105
2018	42	San Pablo, Laguna	Philippines	105
2019	43	Phnom Penh	Cambodia	105
2021	44	Kuala Lumpur	Malaysia	105

Vietnam bagged 22 gold, 21 silver, and 13 bronze medals (56 medals), finishing third - 47th Southeast Asian (SEA) Age Group Aquatics Championships 2025.

== SEA Inter-Club Age Groups Championships ==
SEA Inter-Club Age Groups Championships:

Year	Number	Host city	Host country	Events
2009	7	Singapore	Singapore	

== Medals ==
Medal ranking:

=== Seniors ===
==== 2012 ====
Rank	Nation	Gold	Silver	Bronze	Total
1	Singapore (SIN)	16	12	12	40
2	Indonesia (INA)	9	9	8	26
3	Malaysia (MAS)	8	9	8	25
4	Vietnam (VIE)	5	3	2	10
5	Thailand (THA)	0	3	4	7
6	Philippines (PHI)	0	1	2	3
Totals (6 entries)		38	37	36	111

==== 2014 ====
Rank	Nation	Gold	Silver	Bronze	Total
1	Vietnam (VIE)	12	4	4	20
2	Singapore (SIN)	11	15	12	38
3	Thailand (THA)	8	9	12	29
4	Indonesia (INA)	7	11	5	23
5	Malaysia (MAS)	0	0	2	2
Totals (5 entries)		38	39	35	112

=== Age Groups ===
==== 2005 ====
Rank	Nation	Gold	Silver	Bronze	Total
1	Singapore (SIN)	32	34	21	87
2	Malaysia (MAS)	18	18	13	49
3	Thailand (THA)	16	19	30	65
4	Vietnam (VIE)	14	12	4	30
5	Indonesia (INA)	10	8	10	28
6	Philippines (PHI)	4	3	16	23
7	Myanmar (MYA)	0	0	1	1
Totals (7 entries)		94	94	95	283

==== 2007 ====
Rank	Nation	Gold	Silver	Bronze	Total
1	Singapore (SIN)	38	27	23	88
2	Thailand (THA)	20	31	37	88
3	Malaysia (MAS)	20	20	13	53
4	Indonesia (INA)	11	14	16	41
5	Vietnam (VIE)	4	2	3	9
6	Philippines (PHI)	3	3	4	10
Totals (6 entries)		96	97	96	289

==== 2008 ====
Rank	Nation	Gold	Silver	Bronze	Total
1	Thailand (THA)	39	31	30	100
2	Singapore (SIN)	30	36	28	94
3	Malaysia (MAS)	10	8	10	28
4	Philippines (PHI)	8	7	5	20
5	Indonesia (INA)	6	8	14	28
6	Vietnam (VIE)	3	7	9	19
Totals (6 entries)		96	97	96	289

==== 2009 ====
Rank	Nation	Gold	Silver	Bronze	Total
1	Thailand (THA)	47	32	30	109
2	Malaysia (MAS)	21	23	18	62
3	Singapore (SIN)	14	16	23	53
4	Indonesia (INA)	6	11	10	27
5	Philippines (PHI)	4	9	8	21
6	Vietnam (VIE)	3	5	5	13
Totals (6 entries)		95	96	94	285

==== 2012 ====
Rank	Nation	Gold	Silver	Bronze	Total
1	Thailand (THA)	32	34	33	99
2	Indonesia (INA)	31	31	20	82
3	Singapore (SIN)	16	16	26	58
4	Malaysia (MAS)	14	10	10	34
5	Vietnam (VIE)	11	7	4	22
6	Philippines (PHI)	0	3	8	11
7	Brunei (BRU)	0	0	1	1
Totals (7 entries)		104	101	102	307

==== 2013 ====
Rank	Nation	Gold	Silver	Bronze	Total
1	Singapore (SIN)	29	24	25	78
2	Thailand (THA)	28	40	24	92
3	Malaysia (MAS)	24	18	15	57
4	Vietnam (VIE)	16	5	10	31
5	Philippines (PHI)	3	4	9	16
6	Indonesia (INA)	2	11	20	33
Totals (6 entries)		102	102	103	307

==== 2014 ====
Rank	Nation	Gold	Silver	Bronze	Total
1	Singapore (SIN)	44	31	25	100
2	Vietnam (VIE)	19	13	19	51
3	Thailand (THA)	16	28	28	72
4	Malaysia (MAS)	12	15	10	37
5	Indonesia (INA)	11	11	14	36
6	Philippines (PHI)	0	4	4	8
7	Myanmar (MYA)	0	1	1	2
Totals (7 entries)		102	103	101	306

==== 2015 ====
Rank	Nation	Gold	Silver	Bronze	Total
1	Singapore (SIN)	41	41	28	110
2	Vietnam (VIE)	29	24	21	74
3	Indonesia (INA)	15	23	18	56
4	Malaysia (MAS)	13	3	11	27
5	Thailand (THA)	8	9	20	37
6	Philippines (PHI)	2	2	7	11
Totals (6 entries)		108	102	105	315

==== 2016 ====
Rank	Nation	Gold	Silver	Bronze	Total
1	Vietnam (VIE)	39	39	27	105
2	Indonesia (INA)	24	17	12	53
3	Singapore (SIN)	18	15	21	54
4	Thailand (THA)	17	21	29	67
5	Malaysia (MAS)	6	4	6	16
6	Philippines (PHI)	1	10	11	22
Totals (6 entries)		105	106	106	317

==== 2017 ====
Rank	Nation	Gold	Silver	Bronze	Total
1	Vietnam (VIE)	51	27	13	91
2	Indonesia (INA)	0	0	0	0
2	Malaysia (MAS)	0	0	0	0
2	Philippines (PHI)	0	0	0	0
2	Singapore (SIN)	0	0	0	0
2	Thailand (THA)	0	0	0	0
Totals (6 entries)		51	27	13	91

==== 2018 ====
Rank	Nation	Gold	Silver	Bronze	Total
1	Vietnam (VIE)	58	39	22	119
2	Thailand (THA)	21	22	18	61
3	Indonesia (INA)	12	9	25	46
4	Singapore (SIN)	7	14	15	36
5	Philippines (PHI)	4	10	16	30
6	Malaysia (MAS)	3	11	10	24
Totals (6 entries)		105	105	106	316

==== 2019 ====
Rank	Nation	Gold	Silver	Bronze	Total
1	Vietnam (VIE)	43	41	25	109
2	Thailand (THA)	28	18	30	76
3	Singapore (SIN)	11	16	16	43
4	Indonesia (INA)	10	3	7	20
5	Philippines (PHI)	8	13	9	30
6	Malaysia (MAS)	7	13	17	37
Totals (6 entries)		107	104	104	315

== Participating countries ==
- Brunei
- Cambodia
- Indonesia
- Laos
- Malaysia
- Myanmar
- Philippines
- Singapore
- Thailand
- Vietnam

== See also ==
- Swimming at the South East Asian Games
