= Weightlifting at the 2013 Asian Youth Games =

- Venue: International Expo Centre
- Dates: 17–21 August 2013

Weightlifting at the 2013 Asian Youth Games was held in Nanjing International Expo Centre, Nanjing, China between 17 and 21 August 2013.

== Medalists ==
=== Boys ===
Event	Gold	Silver	Bronze
56 kg	Ji Feiyong; China	Nguyễn Trần Anh Tuấn; Vietnam	T. Lalchhanhima; Independent Olympic Athletes
62 kg	Ri Chong-song; North Korea	Sakda Meeboon; Thailand	Reona Itami; Japan
69 kg	Wei Yinting; China	Natthawut Suepsuan; Thailand	Hsieh Shu-yin; Chinese Taipei
77 kg	Ragala Venkat Rahul; Independent Olympic Athletes	Lu Xingyu; China	Pichet Maneesri; Thailand
85 kg	Pan Yongtao; China	Feng Lei; China	Kang Seung-won; South Korea

=== Girls ===
Event	Gold	Silver	Bronze
48 kg	Jiang Huihua; China	Thunya Sukcharoen; Thailand	Yao Lingling; China
53 kg	Lin Binglian; China	Paek Sol-song; North Korea	Rattanaphon Pakkaratha; Thailand
58 kg	Liang Jingyi; China	Wei Chengyu; China	Yekaterina Stolyarenko; Kazakhstan
63 kg	Qi Xia; China	Nawaporn Daengsri; Thailand	Yuan Yuting; China

== Medal table ==
Rank	Nation	Gold	Silver	Bronze	Total
1	China (CHN)	7	3	2	12
2	North Korea (PRK)	1	1	0	2
3	Independent Olympic Athletes (AOI)	1	0	1	2
4	Thailand (THA)	0	4	2	6
5	Vietnam (VIE)	0	1	0	1
6	Chinese Taipei (TPE)	0	0	1	1
6	Japan (JPN)	0	0	1	1
6	Kazakhstan (KAZ)	0	0	1	1
6	South Korea (KOR)	0	0	1	1
Totals (9 entries)		9	9	9	27

== Results ==
=== Boys ===
==== 56 kg ====
17 August

Rank	Athlete	Group	Body weight	Snatch (kg)				Clean & Jerk (kg)				Total
Rank	Athlete	Group	Body weight	1	2	3	Result	1	2	3	Result	Total
1st place, gold medalist(s)	Ji Feiyong (CHN)	A	55.63	~~103~~	~~104~~	104	104	130	~~135~~	135	135	239
2nd place, silver medalist(s)	Nguyễn Trần Anh Tuấn (VIE)	A	55.25	98	103	105	105	126	130	~~135~~	130	235
3rd place, bronze medalist(s)	T. Lalchhanhima (AOI)	A	55.60	~~98~~	~~100~~	100	100	128	~~132~~	~~135~~	128	228
4	Pak Jong-ju (PRK)	A	55.49	93	97	100	100	123	~~128~~	~~130~~	123	223
5	Kwak Tae-jun (KOR)	A	55.80	82	87	90	90	110	115	~~118~~	115	205
6	Mashkhurbek Yuldashev (UZB)	A	53.87	85	88	~~90~~	88	108	112	~~115~~	112	200
7	Darul Najmi Dollah (MAS)	A	55.11	83	86	~~90~~	86	105	110	~~113~~	110	196
8	Ryuki Shibuya (JPN)	A	55.88	80	85	~~88~~	85	100	105	~~107~~	105	190
9	Sunatullo Oyev (TJK)	A	55.94	80	85	~~90~~	85	95	100	~~105~~	100	185
10	Rony Jesos (MAS)	A	54.98	80	~~85~~	~~85~~	80	~~100~~	102	~~105~~	102	182
11	Mohammed Al-Salami (YEM)	B	55.35	70	75	80	80	92	~~97~~	97	97	177
12	Ali Muheeb (PAK)	B	52.83	~~72~~	72	~~74~~	72	89	94	96	96	168
13	Ösökhbayaryn Chagnaadorj (MGL)	B	53.10	68	73	~~80~~	73	88	93	~~96~~	93	166
14	Ali Al-Alawi (KSA)	B	55.21	61	67	69	69	73	~~79~~	79	79	148
15	Hussain Al-Sheikh (SYR)	B	55.35	~~60~~	62	66	66	76	81	~~86~~	81	147
16	Mohammad Al-Sawagh (KUW)	B	49.74	55	65	~~72~~	65	72	80	~~87~~	80	145
17	Gal-Erdeniin Uuganbaatar (MGL)	B	54.84	65	~~72~~	~~75~~	65	75	~~80~~	80	80	145
18	Yousef Al-Ariar (KUW)	B	55.47	65	~~75~~	~~76~~	65	80	~~90~~	~~92~~	80	145

==== 62 kg ====
17 August

Rank	Athlete	Group	Body weight	Snatch (kg)				Clean & Jerk (kg)				Total
Rank	Athlete	Group	Body weight	1	2	3	Result	1	2	3	Result	Total
1st place, gold medalist(s)	Ri Chong-song (PRK)	A	61.57	107	~~111~~	111	111	137	142	~~145~~	142	253
2nd place, silver medalist(s)	Sakda Meeboon (THA)	A	61.64	101	105	107	107	130	135	141	141	248
3rd place, bronze medalist(s)	Reona Itami (JPN)	A	61.52	105	110	112	112	130	135	~~141~~	135	247
4	Mo Boming (CHN)	A	60.57	111	~~116~~	116	116	130	~~136~~	~~136~~	130	246
5	Manas Stamaliev (KGZ)	A	61.37	107	~~112~~	112	112	128	134	~~138~~	134	246
6	Hein Thura (MYA)	A	60.93	105	110	115	115	130	~~137~~	~~140~~	130	245
7	Chatuphon Pakkaro (THA)	A	61.03	101	105	~~107~~	105	130	~~135~~	~~135~~	130	235
8	Lalu Taku (AOI)	A	61.87	102	~~106~~	~~106~~	102	~~133~~	133	~~137~~	133	235
9	Farajallah Ali (IRQ)	B	60.75	91	93	97	97	116	121	123	123	220
10	Kim Jong-kyoung (KOR)	A	61.75	95	100	~~103~~	100	110	115	—	115	215
11	Zaidi Nordin (MAS)	B	60.00	85	89	91	91	115	~~121~~	122	122	213
12	Firdy Ghivari (INA)	A	61.09	~~91~~	91	~~101~~	91	115	121	~~126~~	121	212
13	Luo Ming-jia (TPE)	A	61.79	~~88~~	88	92	92	108	115	~~122~~	115	207
14	Yazid Hazirul (MAS)	B	60.36	85	90	~~92~~	90	115	~~120~~	~~120~~	115	205
15	Ahmad Al-Mohammad (SYR)	B	61.26	85	~~90~~	91	91	105	~~112~~	112	112	203
16	Mohammad Mohammad (SYR)	B	61.49	~~85~~	87	~~92~~	87	~~100~~	100	106	106	193
17	Muhammad Zubair (PAK)	B	60.80	~~73~~	76	79	79	90	95	98	98	177
18	Khalifa Ahmed (UAE)	B	56.72	65	70	~~72~~	70	80	85	87	87	157
19	Saeed Al-Rumaidh (KSA)	B	61.62	70	~~76~~	~~76~~	70	81	86	~~88~~	86	156
20	Mohsen Yaqoob (KUW)	B	61.73	65	~~72~~	~~72~~	65	~~85~~	~~85~~	85	85	150
21	Abdulrahim Al-Beladi (KSA)	B	60.25	~~56~~	56	66	66	75	81	~~85~~	81	147
22	Khaled Afzaly (AFG)	B	61.07	55	~~60~~	60	60	65	70	75	75	135
—	Chen Tao (CHN)	A	60.92	—	—	—	—	—	—	—	—	NM
—	Akshay Gaikwad (AOI)	A	61.75	—	—	—	—	—	—	—	—	DSQ

==== 69 kg ====
19 August

Rank	Athlete	Group	Body weight	Snatch (kg)				Clean & Jerk (kg)				Total
Rank	Athlete	Group	Body weight	1	2	3	Result	1	2	3	Result	Total
1st place, gold medalist(s)	Wei Yinting (CHN)	A	68.24	123	126	~~130~~	126	146	151	~~158~~	151	277
2nd place, silver medalist(s)	Natthawut Suepsuan (THA)	A	68.97	117	121	125	125	143	148	~~153~~	148	273
3rd place, bronze medalist(s)	Hsieh Shu-yin (TPE)	A	68.32	115	~~119~~	119	119	145	150	153	153	272
4	Sambo Lapung (AOI)	A	68.68	112	116	119	119	145	150	~~154~~	150	269
5	Shakhzod Khudayberganov (UZB)	A	68.45	110	~~115~~	115	115	~~138~~	138	144	144	259
6	Masanori Miyamoto (JPN)	A	65.65	110	115	117	117	135	138	141	141	258
7	Askhat Anardin Uulu (KGZ)	B	67.04	102	~~106~~	108	108	124	~~128~~	128	128	236
8	Hwang Gyu-hyeon (KOR)	A	67.57	100	105	~~110~~	105	130	~~135~~	~~135~~	130	235
9	Muhammad Ali Zulfikar (INA)	A	67.65	95	101	105	105	120	~~125~~	~~125~~	120	225
10	Marko Llena (PHI)	B	68.68	90	96	100	100	115	120	122	122	222
11	Hussein Ali (IRQ)	B	65.74	~~95~~	~~95~~	96	96	117	123	~~126~~	123	219
12	Mohsen Jrech (SYR)	B	66.47	95	~~102~~	102	102	112	117	~~124~~	117	219
13	Ryuya Nagasako (JPN)	B	68.08	~~95~~	95	~~100~~	95	~~114~~	114	118	118	213
14	Sami Al-Othman (KSA)	B	68.48	94	~~98~~	~~99~~	94	111	117	~~120~~	117	211
15	Ahmad Elyas Sediqi (AFG)	B	66.31	78	~~85~~	86	86	105	110	~~115~~	110	196
16	Ösökhbayaryn Davaagombo (MGL)	B	62.66	82	~~87~~	~~87~~	82	95	~~101~~	101	101	183
17	Abdulaziz Al-Mutairi (KUW)	B	68.83	80	~~86~~	~~87~~	80	90	~~95~~	95	95	175

==== 77 kg ====
21 August

Rank	Athlete	Group	Body weight	Snatch (kg)				Clean & Jerk (kg)				Total
Rank	Athlete	Group	Body weight	1	2	3	Result	1	2	3	Result	Total
1st place, gold medalist(s)	Ragala Venkat Rahul (AOI)	A	76.95	132	137	142	142	158	164	168	168	310
2nd place, silver medalist(s)	Lu Xingyu (CHN)	A	75.78	118	125	128	128	148	152	157	157	285
3rd place, bronze medalist(s)	Pichet Maneesri (THA)	A	74.04	115	119	123	123	145	150	157	157	280
4	Yan Yucheng (CHN)	A	75.92	111	~~116~~	~~118~~	111	141	150	155	155	266
5	Manop Chitrakan (THA)	A	74.22	~~115~~	116	120	120	145	~~150~~	~~150~~	145	265
6	Kursant Tolonov (KGZ)	A	76.13	~~116~~	116	~~120~~	116	145	~~153~~	~~153~~	145	261
7	Sherzod Marufjonov (UZB)	A	76.16	110	~~115~~	~~116~~	110	135	141	~~145~~	141	251
8	Azat Serdarow (TKM)	A	76.70	111	~~116~~	~~117~~	111	140	~~145~~	~~145~~	140	251
9	Afifi Haikal Nordin (MAS)	A	74.14	~~97~~	97	100	100	120	~~125~~	~~125~~	120	220
10	Hasan Ali Eissa (YEM)	A	74.32	82	87	91	91	105	111	115	115	206
11	Abdur Rehman (PAK)	A	75.92	87	~~91~~	92	92	106	110	113	113	205

==== 85 kg ====
21 August

Rank	Athlete	Group	Body weight	Snatch (kg)				Clean & Jerk (kg)				Total
Rank	Athlete	Group	Body weight	1	2	3	Result	1	2	3	Result	Total
1st place, gold medalist(s)	Pan Yongtao (CHN)	A	83.59	125	130	135	135	155	~~161~~	161	161	296
2nd place, silver medalist(s)	Feng Lei (CHN)	A	83.71	125	130	~~135~~	130	155	160	~~166~~	160	290
3rd place, bronze medalist(s)	Kang Seung-won (KOR)	A	82.93	120	~~125~~	125	125	150	160	~~163~~	160	285
4	Muhammetnur Jannyýew (TKM)	A	84.52	120	126	~~130~~	126	140	~~145~~	~~150~~	140	266
5	Öwez Öwezow (TKM)	A	81.09	115	120	~~125~~	120	~~142~~	142	~~155~~	142	262
6	Isuru Senadeera (SRI)	A	84.56	105	~~110~~	110	110	130	135	~~140~~	135	245
7	Farkhodbek Sobirov (UZB)	A	78.74	100	105	108	108	120	126	131	131	239
8	Riyan Antoni (INA)	A	80.64	100	~~107~~	~~108~~	100	126	131	~~141~~	131	231
9	Avazbek Kavlanxanov (UZB)	A	83.70	85	90	92	92	115	120	123	123	215
10	Almur Al-Marri (UAE)	A	84.22	80	85	~~87~~	85	100	107	~~111~~	107	192
11	Ali Al-Boulashi (KUW)	A	81.93	75	82	~~85~~	82	90	~~103~~	~~103~~	90	172

=== Girls ===
==== 48 kg ====
17 August

Rank	Athlete	Group	Body weight	Snatch (kg)				Clean & Jerk (kg)				Total
Rank	Athlete	Group	Body weight	1	2	3	Result	1	2	3	Result	Total
1st place, gold medalist(s)	Jiang Huihua (CHN)	A	46.30	71	76	83	83	85	93	100	100	183
2nd place, silver medalist(s)	Thunya Sukcharoen (THA)	A	47.73	65	68	70	70	85	90	~~94~~	90	160
3rd place, bronze medalist(s)	Yao Lingling (CHN)	A	46.97	63	67	~~70~~	67	80	85	~~88~~	85	152
4	Kang Hyon-gyong (PRK)	A	47.84	66	~~69~~	~~70~~	66	86	~~90~~	~~90~~	86	152
5	Park Yae-im (KOR)	A	47.88	~~60~~	60	~~65~~	60	~~80~~	80	85	85	145
6	Megawati (INA)	A	47.33	56	59	~~62~~	59	76	~~80~~	~~80~~	76	135
7	Dinuda Abeysekara (SRI)	B	47.39	55	58	~~60~~	58	70	73	75	75	133
8	Elien Perez (PHI)	A	46.45	~~55~~	55	60	60	70	~~75~~	~~75~~	70	130
9	Ýulduz Jumabaýewa (TKM)	B	47.28	~~50~~	52	~~55~~	52	62	66	~~68~~	66	118
10	Jahura Akhter Reshma (BAN)	B	45.87	48	~~51~~	51	51	60	64	66	66	117
11	Misaki Kihira (JPN)	B	45.94	46	48	~~50~~	48	56	60	~~63~~	60	108
12	Gansereeteriin Baasanjargal (MGL)	B	47.54	42	~~45~~	45	45	52	56	~~59~~	56	101
—	Chandrika Tarafdar (AOI)	A	45.76	—	—	—	—	—	—	—	—	DSQ

==== 53 kg ====
19 August

Rank	Athlete	Group	Body weight	Snatch (kg)				Clean & Jerk (kg)				Total
Rank	Athlete	Group	Body weight	1	2	3	Result	1	2	3	Result	Total
1st place, gold medalist(s)	Lin Binglian (CHN)	A	52.77	78	81	85	85	96	101	103	103	188
2nd place, silver medalist(s)	Paek Sol-song (PRK)	A	52.72	~~77~~	77	80	80	96	101	~~108~~	101	181
3rd place, bronze medalist(s)	Rattanaphon Pakkaratha (THA)	A	52.93	70	73	~~75~~	73	90	95	100	100	173
4	Uraiwan Kamking (THA)	A	52.74	70	~~73~~	~~73~~	70	87	90	93	93	163
5	Annisa Nur Permata Sholehah (INA)	A	52.68	65	~~71~~	71	71	82	87	~~90~~	87	158
6	Phạm Hồng Đào (VIE)	A	51.84	~~70~~	71	~~73~~	71	85	~~89~~	~~89~~	85	156
7	Altynay Damen (KAZ)	B	52.97	63	67	~~71~~	67	77	82	86	86	153
8	Jeong Ye-eun (KOR)	B	52.42	~~62~~	63	65	65	80	~~85~~	~~85~~	80	145
9	Kim Ye-rim (KOR)	B	51.61	55	60	~~65~~	60	75	~~80~~	80	80	140
10	Margaret Colonia (PHI)	B	52.07	56	~~61~~	61	61	70	~~75~~	~~75~~	70	131
11	Bolormaagiin Myagmartseren (MGL)	B	51.78	~~56~~	56	~~58~~	56	~~66~~	66	~~69~~	66	122
12	Anon Murakami (JPN)	B	50.61	~~46~~	46	48	48	59	62	66	66	114
13	Altangereliin Bum-Ayuush (MGL)	B	49.70	~~47~~	47	~~51~~	47	55	60	~~63~~	60	107
—	Joti Mal (AOI)	A	52.97	—	—	—	—	—	—	—	—	DSQ

==== 58 kg ====
19 August

Rank	Athlete	Group	Body weight	Snatch (kg)				Clean & Jerk (kg)				Total
Rank	Athlete	Group	Body weight	1	2	3	Result	1	2	3	Result	Total
1st place, gold medalist(s)	Liang Jingyi (CHN)	A	56.06	80	85	88	88	105	110	112	112	200
2nd place, silver medalist(s)	Wei Chengyu (CHN)	A	57.18	~~80~~	~~80~~	80	80	110	~~121~~	~~121~~	110	190
3rd place, bronze medalist(s)	Yekaterina Stolyarenko (KAZ)	A	57.33	77	81	85	85	96	101	~~105~~	101	186
4	Chiang Nien-hsin (TPE)	A	57.33	75	~~79~~	~~79~~	75	100	~~112~~	~~112~~	100	175
5	Sagolsem Thasana Chanu (AOI)	A	57.91	70	73	~~76~~	73	90	93	96	96	169
6	Acchedya Jagaddhita (INA)	A	57.40	70	~~76~~	~~76~~	70	90	95	~~100~~	95	165
7	Kim So-hee (KOR)	A	55.37	70	73	~~75~~	73	~~85~~	90	~~93~~	90	163
8	Mabia Akhter (BAN)	A	57.26	~~65~~	65	~~67~~	65	83	86	~~90~~	86	151
9	Ganzorigiin Anuujin (MGL)	A	55.28	47	51	~~55~~	51	56	61	~~65~~	61	112

==== 63 kg ====
21 August

Rank	Athlete	Group	Body weight	Snatch (kg)				Clean & Jerk (kg)				Total
Rank	Athlete	Group	Body weight	1	2	3	Result	1	2	3	Result	Total
1st place, gold medalist(s)	Qi Xia (CHN)	A	61.36	85	~~90~~	90	90	105	~~112~~	112	112	202
2nd place, silver medalist(s)	Nawaporn Daengsri (THA)	A	62.69	85	~~89~~	~~89~~	85	106	111	112	112	197
3rd place, bronze medalist(s)	Yuan Yuting (CHN)	A	60.58	85	91	~~93~~	91	105	~~111~~	~~111~~	105	196
4	Zar Thu (MYA)	A	62.76	83	~~86~~	86	86	105	109	~~111~~	109	195
5	Noh Eun-young (KOR)	A	62.54	70	~~75~~	75	75	85	~~90~~	~~90~~	85	160
6	Miku Ishii (JPN)	A	62.36	66	70	~~73~~	70	82	~~86~~	~~86~~	82	152
—	Mönkhjantsangiin Ankhtsetseg (MGL)	A	62.94	~~81~~	81	—	81	—	—	—	—	NM
—	Manpreet Kaur (AOI)	A	62.70	—	—	—	—	—	—	—	—	DSQ
