= Fencing at the 2013 Asian Youth Games =

- Venue: International Expo Center
- Dates: 19–21 August 2013

Fencing at the 2013 Asian Youth Games was held in Nanjing International Expo Center Hall E from 19 to 21 August 2013 in Nanjing, China.

== Medalists ==
=== Boys ===
Event	Gold	Silver	Bronze
Épée	Gu Xinyuan; China	Zhu Haiyu; China	Zachary Chen; Singapore
Épée	Gu Xinyuan; China	Zhu Haiyu; China	Akira Komata; Japan
Foil	Cheung Ka Long; Hong Kong	Toshiya Saito; Japan	Wang Weifa; China
Foil	Cheung Ka Long; Hong Kong	Toshiya Saito; Japan	Huang Mengkai; China
Sabre	Xu Qiancheng; China	Bag Do-young; South Korea	Choy Yu Yong; Singapore
Sabre	Xu Qiancheng; China	Bag Do-young; South Korea	Zhang Qian; China

=== Girls ===
Event	Gold	Silver	Bronze
Épée	Zhong Peiying; China	Debbie Ho; Hong Kong	Mai Yonglan; China
Épée	Zhong Peiying; China	Debbie Ho; Hong Kong	Cheng Ya-fang; Chinese Taipei
Foil	Chen Qingyuan; China	Karin Miyawaki; Japan	Lau Cheuk Yu; Hong Kong
Foil	Chen Qingyuan; China	Karin Miyawaki; Japan	Xiong Xueying; China
Sabre	Ayaka Mukae; Japan	Guo Yiqi; China	Jolie Lee; Singapore
Sabre	Ayaka Mukae; Japan	Guo Yiqi; China	Zang Yuqi; China

== Medal table ==
Rank	Nation	Gold	Silver	Bronze	Total
1	China (CHN)	4	2	6	12
2	Japan (JPN)	1	2	1	4
3	Hong Kong (HKG)	1	1	1	3
4	South Korea (KOR)	0	1	0	1
5	Singapore (SIN)	0	0	3	3
6	Chinese Taipei (TPE)	0	0	1	1
Totals (6 entries)		6	6	12	24

== Results ==
=== Boys ===
==== Épée ====
20 August

===== Round of pools =====
Rank	Athlete	W	L	W/M	TD	TF
1	Zhu Haiyu (CHN)	6	0	1.000	+20	30
2	Gu Xinyuan (CHN)	5	0	1.000	+13	25
3	Samuel Lee (SIN)	5	0	1.000	+8	24
4	Shinkai Kawakita (JPN)	5	1	0.833	+4	26
5	Zachary Chen (SIN)	4	1	0.800	+11	23
6	Abdullah Dababneh (JOR)	4	2	0.667	+2	23
7	Javokhirbek Nurmatov (UZB)	3	2	0.600	+5	20
8	Mohammed Al-Dosari (QAT)	3	2	0.600	+2	23
9	Nidal Al-Sheikh (JOR)	3	2	0.600	+2	21
9	Iskandar Loh (MAS)	3	2	0.600	+2	21
11	Mohammed Muqri (KSA)	3	2	0.600	+2	20
12	Antoine El-Choueiri (LIB)	3	2	0.600	0	21
13	Jawad Al-Dawood (KSA)	3	3	0.500	+4	24
14	Akira Komata (JPN)	2	3	0.400	+3	21
15	Rami Ghorra (LIB)	2	3	0.400	−1	21
16	Abdulbosid Nasirdinov (UZB)	2	3	0.400	−1	17
17	Thatchakorn Sukpanya (THA)	2	3	0.400	−5	17
17	Fahmy Hatta Samsudin (MAS)	2	3	0.400	−5	17
19	Abdulrahman Al-Hashemi (QAT)	2	4	0.333	+2	26
20	Gerardo Hernandez (PHI)	1	4	0.200	−5	19
21	Vladislav Semenov (KAZ)	1	4	0.200	−6	14
22	Batsürengiin Amarbold (MGL)	1	4	0.200	−7	16
23	Mohammed Abuturiya (PLE)	1	5	0.167	−8	18
24	Mohammad Al-Harbi (KUW)	0	5	0.000	−18	7
25	Nitesh Paudel (NEP)	0	6	0.000	−24	6

===== Knockout round =====
Round of 32
Thatchakorn Sukpanya (THA)	9–10	Abdulbosid Nasirdinov (UZB)
Nidal Al-Sheikh (JOR)	15–9	Mohammad Al-Harbi (KUW)
Nitesh Paudel (NEP)	4–15	Mohammed Al-Dosari (QAT)
Vladislav Semenov (KAZ)	13–15	Antoine El-Choueiri (LIB)
Jawad Al-Dawood (KSA)	15–8	Gerardo Hernandez (PHI)
Abdulrahman Al-Hashemi (QAT)	10–15	Akira Komata (JPN)
Mohammed Muqri (KSA)	13–15	Batsürengiin Amarbold (MGL)
Mohammed Abuturiya (PLE)	5–15	Iskandar Loh (MAS)
Rami Ghorra (LIB)	15–4	Fahmy Hatta Samsudin (MAS)

Round of 16
Zhu Haiyu (CHN)	15
Abdulbosid Nasirdinov (UZB)	7
Nidal Al-Sheikh (JOR)	11
Mohammed Al-Dosari (QAT)	15
Zachary Chen (SIN)	15
Antoine El-Choueiri (LIB)	5
Jawad Al-Dawood (KSA)	15
Shinkai Kawakita (JPN)	14
Samuel Lee (SIN)	13
Akira Komata (JPN)	15
Batsürengiin Amarbold (MGL)	13
Abdullah Dababneh (JOR)	15
Javokhirbek Nurmatov (UZB)	12
Iskandar Loh (MAS)	13
Rami Ghorra (LIB)	5
Gu Xinyuan (CHN)	15

Quarterfinals
Zhu Haiyu (CHN)	15
Mohammed Al-Dosari (QAT)	4
Zachary Chen (SIN)	15
Jawad Al-Dawood (KSA)	12
Akira Komata (JPN)	15
Abdullah Dababneh (JOR)	14
Iskandar Loh (MAS)	12
Gu Xinyuan (CHN)	15

Semifinals
Zhu Haiyu (CHN)	13
Zachary Chen (SIN)	8
Akira Komata (JPN)	6
Gu Xinyuan (CHN)	15

Final
Zhu Haiyu (CHN)	10
Gu Xinyuan (CHN)	13

==== Foil ====
21 August

===== Round of pools =====
Rank	Athlete	W	L	W/M	TD	TF
1	Cheung Ka Long (HKG)	5	0	1.000	+22	25
2	Toshiya Saito (JPN)	5	0	1.000	+21	25
3	Ryan Choi (HKG)	6	0	1.000	+19	30
4	Jet Ng (SIN)	5	0	1.000	+17	25
5	Wang Weifa (CHN)	5	1	0.833	+17	29
6	Huang Mengkai (CHN)	4	1	0.800	+14	23
7	Rikuto Takeda (JPN)	4	1	0.800	+10	21
8	Bryan Mok (MAS)	4	2	0.667	+13	25
9	Nayef Al-Enezi (KUW)	3	2	0.600	+7	18
10	Antoine El-Choueiri (LIB)	3	2	0.600	+6	18
11	Dmitriy Kossachyov (KAZ)	3	2	0.600	+5	20
12	Cheng Xing Han (MAS)	3	2	0.600	+4	18
12	Christian Lim (SIN)	3	2	0.600	+4	18
14	Sitsadipat Doungpatra (THA)	3	2	0.600	+1	19
15	Rami Ghorra (LIB)	3	2	0.600	+1	18
16	Fajar Galuh Rezcha (INA)	3	2	0.600	−3	15
17	Nahyan Al-Azazi (UAE)	2	3	0.400	0	19
18	Sirojjon Boychaev (UZB)	2	3	0.400	−5	15
19	Ahmad Abu Taha (JOR)	2	3	0.400	−5	13
20	Hamad Al-Atawi (BRN)	2	3	0.400	−7	13
20	Hasan Al-Khayaat (KUW)	2	3	0.400	−7	13
22	Nguyễn Minh Quang (VIE)	2	4	0.333	−5	19
23	Hamad Al-Asmi (QAT)	2	4	0.333	−12	14
24	Enkhbaataryn Enkhtulga (MGL)	1	4	0.200	−7	13
25	Khalifah Al-Omairi (KSA)	1	4	0.200	−8	13
26	Sultan Basahl (QAT)	1	4	0.200	−11	10
27	Janibek Khalmuratov (UZB)	1	5	0.167	−16	11
27	Boldbaataryn Misheel (MGL)	1	5	0.167	−16	11
29	Ali Al-Binali (KSA)	0	5	0.000	−18	7
30	Hazeeq Asmui'e (BRU)	0	5	0.000	−20	5
31	Aizuddin Yaqin (BRU)	0	5	0.000	−21	4

===== Knockout round =====
Round of 32
Nahyan Al-Azazi (UAE)	15–12	Fajar Galuh Rezcha (INA)
Nayef Al-Enezi (KUW)	15–0	Enkhbaataryn Enkhtulga (MGL)
Khalifah Al-Omairi (KSA)	7–15	Bryan Mok (MAS)
Wang Weifa (CHN)	15–3	Boldbaataryn Misheel (MGL)
Hasan Al-Khayaat (KUW)	7–15	Cheng Xing Han (MAS)
Christian Lim (SIN)	15–6	Hamad Al-Atawi (BRN)
Ali Al-Binali (KSA)	3–15	Jet Ng (SIN)
Ryan Choi (HKG)	15–3	Hazeeq Asmui'e (BRU)
Ahmad Abu Taha (JOR)	15–14	Sitsadipat Doungpatra (THA)
Dmitriy Kossachyov (KAZ)	15–10	Nguyễn Minh Quang (VIE)
Janibek Khalmuratov (UZB)	6–15	Huang Mengkai (CHN)
Rikuto Takeda (JPN)	15–6	Sultan Basahl (QAT)
Hamad Al-Asmi (QAT)	15–14	Antoine El-Choueiri (LIB)
Rami Ghorra (LIB)	15–8	Sirojjon Boychaev (UZB)
Aizuddin Yaqin (BRU)	0–15	Toshiya Saito (JPN)

Round of 16
Cheung Ka Long (HKG)	15
Nahyan Al-Azazi (UAE)	3
Nayef Al-Enezi (KUW)	8
Bryan Mok (MAS)	15
Wang Weifa (CHN)	15
Cheng Xing Han (MAS)	2
Christian Lim (SIN)	15
Jet Ng (SIN)	13
Ryan Choi (HKG)	15
Ahmad Abu Taha (JOR)	2
Dmitriy Kossachyov (KAZ)	2
Huang Mengkai (CHN)	15
Rikuto Takeda (JPN)	15
Hamad Al-Asmi (QAT)	3
Rami Ghorra (LIB)	3
Toshiya Saito (JPN)	15

Quarterfinals
Cheung Ka Long (HKG)	15
Bryan Mok (MAS)	6
Wang Weifa (CHN)	15
Christian Lim (SIN)	5
Ryan Choi (HKG)	13
Huang Mengkai (CHN)	15
Rikuto Takeda (JPN)	8
Toshiya Saito (JPN)	15

Semifinals
Cheung Ka Long (HKG)	15
Wang Weifa (CHN)	6
Huang Mengkai (CHN)	10
Toshiya Saito (JPN)	15

Final
Cheung Ka Long (HKG)	15
Toshiya Saito (JPN)	6

==== Sabre ====
19 August

===== Round of pools =====
Rank	Athlete	W	L	W/M	TD	TF
1	Xu Qiancheng (CHN)	5	0	1.000	+18	25
2	Zhang Qian (CHN)	5	0	1.000	+13	25
3	Murtadha Hassan (IRQ)	5	0	1.000	+9	25
4	Nurlan Kassymov (KAZ)	4	1	0.800	+10	24
5	Choy Yu Yong (SIN)	4	1	0.800	+8	23
6	Bag Do-young (KOR)	3	2	0.600	+11	22
7	Norihiro Shimizu (JPN)	3	2	0.600	+6	21
7	Voragun Srinualnad (THA)	3	2	0.600	+6	21
9	Kento Hoshino (JPN)	3	2	0.600	+3	20
10	Basim Fakhir (IRQ)	3	2	0.600	+2	19
11	Kua Kim Yong (MAS)	3	2	0.600	+2	18
11	Spartak Bekchanov (UZB)	3	2	0.600	+2	18
13	Jeremy Tan (SIN)	3	2	0.600	+1	17
14	Syed Adam Emir Putra (MAS)	2	3	0.400	0	20
15	Christian Concepcion (PHI)	2	3	0.400	−2	15
16	Ahmed Al-Qudihi (KSA)	2	3	0.400	−3	18
17	Nguyễn Thọ Tùng (VIE)	2	3	0.400	−3	16
18	Yousef Al-Shamlan (KUW)	1	4	0.200	−6	16
19	Anaqi Danish (BRU)	1	4	0.200	−7	15
20	Bandar Al-Shamlan (KUW)	1	4	0.200	−7	14
21	Wael Al-Majali (JOR)	1	4	0.200	−10	14
22	Adel Al-Mutairi (KSA)	1	4	0.200	−13	10
23	Fares Al-Majali (JOR)	0	5	0.000	−18	7
24	Haziq Asahrin (BRU)	0	5	0.000	−22	3

===== Knockout round =====
Round of 32
Nguyễn Thọ Tùng (VIE)	15–9	Ahmed Al-Qudihi (KSA)
Kento Hoshino (JPN)	15–10	Haziq Asahrin (BRU)
Wael Al-Majali (JOR)	8–15	Spartak Bekchanov (UZB)
Jeremy Tan (SIN)	15–14	Bandar Al-Shamlan (KUW)
Anaqi Danish (BRU)	15–13	Syed Adam Emir Putra (MAS)
Kua Kim Yong (MAS)	13–15	Adel Al-Mutairi (KSA)
Fares Al-Majali (JOR)	6–15	Basim Fakhir (IRQ)
Christian Concepcion (PHI)	6–15	Yousef Al-Shamlan (KUW)

Round of 16
Xu Qiancheng (CHN)	15
Nguyễn Thọ Tùng (VIE)	8
Kento Hoshino (JPN)	6
Voragun Srinualnad (THA)	15
Choy Yu Yong (SIN)	15
Spartak Bekchanov (UZB)	7
Jeremy Tan (SIN)	11
Nurlan Kassymov (KAZ)	15
Murtadha Hassan (IRQ)	15
Anaqi Danish (BRU)	8
Adel Al-Mutairi (KSA)	7
Bag Do-young (KOR)	15
Norihiro Shimizu (JPN)	15
Basim Fakhir (IRQ)	12
Yousef Al-Shamlan (KUW)	14
Zhang Qian (CHN)	15

Quarterfinals
Xu Qiancheng (CHN)	15
Voragun Srinualnad (THA)	10
Choy Yu Yong (SIN)	15
Nurlan Kassymov (KAZ)	10
Murtadha Hassan (IRQ)	2
Bag Do-young (KOR)	15
Norihiro Shimizu (JPN)	13
Zhang Qian (CHN)	15

Semifinals
Xu Qiancheng (CHN)	15
Choy Yu Yong (SIN)	11
Bag Do-young (KOR)	15
Zhang Qian (CHN)	14

Final
Xu Qiancheng (CHN)	15
Bag Do-young (KOR)	12

=== Girls ===
==== Épée ====
20 August

===== Round of pools =====
Rank	Athlete	W	L	W/M	TD	TF
1	Mai Yonglan (CHN)	5	0	1.000	+16	25
2	Donna Lim (SIN)	4	1	0.800	+10	22
3	Korawan Thanee (THA)	4	1	0.800	+9	24
4	Zhong Peiying (CHN)	4	1	0.800	+8	22
5	Kuo Yen-ju (TPE)	4	1	0.800	+6	24
6	Debbie Ho (HKG)	4	1	0.800	+4	23
7	Cheng Ya-fang (TPE)	3	2	0.600	+7	22
8	Miho Yoshimura (JPN)	3	2	0.600	+3	21
9	Lin Al-Kloub (JOR)	3	2	0.600	+1	22
10	Yuna Maeda (JPN)	3	2	0.600	+1	19
11	Trần Thị Thùy Trinh (VIE)	3	2	0.600	−3	19
12	Nguyễn Thị Hậu (VIE)	3	2	0.600	−5	15
13	Zaharah Sailan Abdullah (MAS)	1	4	0.200	−5	18
14	Nigora Sodikova (UZB)	1	4	0.200	−8	14
15	Veronika Rojkova (UZB)	1	4	0.200	−9	15
16	Haneen Al-Nawasrah (JOR)	0	5	0.000	−10	15
17	Syafira Ayu Laksari (INA)	0	5	0.000	−12	13
18	Nedaa Abulebda (PLE)	0	5	0.000	−13	12

===== Knockout round =====
Round of 32
Syafira Ayu Laksari (INA)	14–15	Haneen Al-Nawasrah (JOR)
Veronika Rojkova (UZB)	15–9	Nedaa Abulebda (PLE)

Round of 16
Mai Yonglan (CHN)	15
Haneen Al-Nawasrah (JOR)	3
Lin Al-Kloub (JOR)	8
Miho Yoshimura (JPN)	10
Kuo Yen-ju (TPE)	11
Nguyễn Thị Hậu (VIE)	15
Zaharah Sailan Abdullah (MAS)	7
Zhong Peiying (CHN)	15
Korawan Thanee (THA)	13
Nigora Sodikova (UZB)	6
Trần Thị Thùy Trinh (VIE)	9
Debbie Ho (HKG)	15
Cheng Ya-fang (TPE)	15
Yuna Maeda (JPN)	8
Veronika Rojkova (UZB)	14
Donna Lim (SIN)	15

Quarterfinals
Mai Yonglan (CHN)	15
Miho Yoshimura (JPN)	12
Nguyễn Thị Hậu (VIE)	6
Zhong Peiying (CHN)	15
Korawan Thanee (THA)	9
Debbie Ho (HKG)	15
Cheng Ya-fang (TPE)	15
Donna Lim (SIN)	10

Semifinals
Mai Yonglan (CHN)	11
Zhong Peiying (CHN)	15
Debbie Ho (HKG)	15
Cheng Ya-fang (TPE)	12

Final
Zhong Peiying (CHN)	15
Debbie Ho (HKG)	12

==== Foil ====
19 August

===== Round of pools =====
Rank	Athlete	W	L	W/M	TD	TF
1	Lau Cheuk Yu (HKG)	5	0	1.000	+19	25
2	Xiong Xueying (CHN)	4	1	0.800	+15	22
3	Chen Qingyuan (CHN)	4	1	0.800	+9	20
4	Kuralay Seidakhmetova (KAZ)	4	1	0.800	+8	22
5	Karin Miyawaki (JPN)	3	1	0.750	+9	19
6	Jin Su-min (KOR)	3	1	0.750	+7	17
7	Haruka Umetsu (JPN)	3	2	0.600	+6	20
8	Sirithorn Nateethorn (THA)	3	2	0.600	+3	18
9	Lau Ysien (SIN)	2	2	0.500	+2	17
10	Nicole Wong (SIN)	2	3	0.400	+2	19
11	Divine Romero (PHI)	2	3	0.400	−8	13
12	Rahaf Al-Hadidi (JOR)	1	3	0.250	−9	10
13	Thoibi Devi (AOI)	1	3	0.250	−9	7
14	Nurul Aini (INA)	1	4	0.200	−8	13
15	Slena Omar (JOR)	1	4	0.200	−11	9
16	Tyanne Fong (MAS)	1	4	0.200	−14	7
17	Nor Fatinaina Jalani (MAS)	0	5	0.000	−21	4

===== Knockout round =====
Round of 32
Nor Fatinaina Jalani (MAS)	6–15	Tyanne Fong (MAS)

Round of 16
Lau Cheuk Yu (HKG)	15
Tyanne Fong (MAS)	12
Lau Ysien (SIN)	15
Sirithorn Nateethorn (THA)	8
Karin Miyawaki (JPN)	15
Rahaf Al-Hadidi (JOR)	6
Thoibi Devi (AOI)	6
Kuralay Seidakhmetova (KAZ)	15
Chen Qingyuan (CHN)	15
Nurul Aini (INA)	8
Divine Romero (PHI)	9
Jin Su-min (KOR)	15
Haruka Umetsu (JPN)	11
Nicole Wong (SIN)	15
Slena Omar (JOR)	0
Xiong Xueying (CHN)	15

Quarterfinals
Lau Cheuk Yu (HKG)	15
Lau Ysien (SIN)	7
Karin Miyawaki (JPN)	15
Kuralay Seidakhmetova (KAZ)	5
Chen Qingyuan (CHN)	15
Jin Su-min (KOR)	14
Nicole Wong (SIN)	5
Xiong Xueying (CHN)	15

Semifinals
Lau Cheuk Yu (HKG)	6
Karin Miyawaki (JPN)	15
Chen Qingyuan (CHN)	3
Xiong Xueying (CHN)	2

Final
Karin Miyawaki (JPN)	12
Chen Qingyuan (CHN)	15

==== Sabre ====
21 August

===== Round of pools =====
Rank	Athlete	W	L	W/M	TD	TF
1	Risa Takashima (JPN)	4	0	1.000	+17	20
2	Ye Yi-shan (TPE)	5	0	1.000	+13	25
3	Zang Yuqi (CHN)	4	1	0.800	+15	24
4	Wu Ya-shiuan (TPE)	4	1	0.800	+3	21
5	Jolie Lee (SIN)	3	1	0.750	+9	17
6	Candice Lee (SIN)	3	2	0.600	+8	22
7	Guo Yiqi (CHN)	3	2	0.600	+7	22
8	Aigerim Sarybay (KAZ)	3	2	0.600	+6	22
9	Ayaka Mukae (JPN)	3	2	0.600	+5	21
10	Nguyễn Thị Hồng Vân (VIE)	2	2	0.500	−3	11
11	Tonpan Pokeaw (THA)	2	3	0.400	−3	18
12	Nguyễn Thị Thanh Lan (VIE)	2	3	0.400	−4	14
13	Josna Christy Jose (AOI)	1	3	0.250	−10	7
14	Sara Athamneh (JOR)	1	4	0.200	−13	10
15	Rawan Ebrahim (BRN)	0	4	0.000	−13	7
16	Anitha Karunakaran (AOI)	0	5	0.000	−18	7
17	Fadwah Al-Motawa (BRN)	0	5	0.000	−19	6

===== Knockout round =====
Round of 32
Fadwah Al-Motawa (BRN)	4–15	Anitha Karunakaran (AOI)

Round of 16
Risa Takashima (JPN)	15
Anitha Karunakaran (AOI)	2
Ayaka Mukae (JPN)	15
Aigerim Sarybay (KAZ)	4
Jolie Lee (SIN)	15
Nguyễn Thị Thanh Lan (VIE)	2
Josna Christy Jose (AOI)	9
Wu Ya-shiuan (TPE)	15
Zang Yuqi (CHN)	15
Sara Athamneh (JOR)	2
Tonpan Pokeaw (THA)	15
Candice Lee (SIN)	10
Guo Yiqi (CHN)	15
Nguyễn Thị Hồng Vân (VIE)	3
Rawan Ebrahim (BRN)	4
Ye Yi-shan (TPE)	15

Quarterfinals
Risa Takashima (JPN)	5
Ayaka Mukae (JPN)	15
Jolie Lee (SIN)	15
Wu Ya-shiuan (TPE)	13
Zang Yuqi (CHN)	15
Tonpan Pokeaw (THA)	6
Guo Yiqi (CHN)	15
Ye Yi-shan (TPE)	7

Semifinals
Ayaka Mukae (JPN)	15
Jolie Lee (SIN)	9
Zang Yuqi (CHN)	11
Guo Yiqi (CHN)	15

Final
Ayaka Mukae (JPN)	15
Guo Yiqi (CHN)	12
