= Tennis at the 2013 Asian Youth Games =

- Venue: Tennis Academy of China
- Dates: 17–23 August 2013

Tennis at the 2013 Asian Youth Games was held in Tennis Academy of China, Nanjing, China between 17 and 23 August 2013.

== Medalists ==
Event	Gold	Silver	Bronze
Boys' singles	Lý Hoàng Nam; Vietnam	Jurence Mendoza; Philippines	Dmitry Popko; Kazakhstan
Boys' singles	Lý Hoàng Nam; Vietnam	Jurence Mendoza; Philippines	Garvit Batra; Independent Olympic Athletes
Girls' singles	Sun Ziyue; China	Wang Yan; China	Assiya Dair; Kazakhstan
Girls' singles	Sun Ziyue; China	Wang Yan; China	Kamonwan Buayam; Thailand
Mixed doubles	China; Zheng Weiqiang; Sun Ziyue	Chinese Taipei; Yang Shao-chi; Hsu Ching-wen	Thailand; Teeradon Tortrakul; Kamonwan Buayam
Mixed doubles	China; Zheng Weiqiang; Sun Ziyue	Chinese Taipei; Yang Shao-chi; Hsu Ching-wen	China; Qiu Zhuoyang; Wang Yan

== Medal table ==
Rank	Nation	Gold	Silver	Bronze	Total
1	China (CHN)	2	1	1	4
2	Vietnam (VIE)	1	0	0	1
3	Chinese Taipei (TPE)	0	1	0	1
3	Philippines (PHI)	0	1	0	1
5	Kazakhstan (KAZ)	0	0	2	2
5	Thailand (THA)	0	0	2	2
7	Independent Olympic Athletes (AOI)	0	0	1	1
Totals (7 entries)		3	3	6	12

== Results ==
=== Boys' singles ===
First round – 17–18 August
Zheng Weiqiang (CHN)	2–0 (6–2, 6–2)	Armando Soemarno (INA)
Li Hei Yin (HKG)	2–0 (6–0, 6–0)	Amr Mohammed Hassan (YEM)
Kareem Al-Allaf (SYR)	0–2 (1–6, 2–6)	Dmitry Popko (KAZ)
Aman Agarwal (AOI)	2–1 (6–2, 3–6, 6–3)	Sharmal Dissanayake (SRI)
Lý Hoàng Nam (VIE)	2–0 (6–0, 6–0)	Omar Fahmi (KSA)
Tashi Dorji (BHU)	0–2 (1–6, 1–6)	Congsup Congcar (THA)
Fahad Janahi (UAE)	0–2 (5–7, 2–6)	Dawood Hashim (KUW)
Enkhzayaagiin Tsovoo (MGL)	0–2 (0–6, 0–6)	Yang Shao-chi (TPE)
Qiu Zhuoyang (CHN)	2–0 (6–0, 6–1)	Ghassan Al-Ansi (YEM)
Garvit Batra (AOI)	2–0 (6–0, 6–0)	Abdulla Ahli (UAE)
Abdulla Al-Mahmoud (QAT)	0–2 (4–6, 0–6)	Roman Khassanov (KAZ)
Anthony Susanto (INA)	RET (6–2, 3–2)	Jurabek Karimov (UZB)
Teeradon Tortrakul (THA)	2–0 (6–3, 6–1)	Wu Tung-lin (TPE)
Wong Hong Kit (HKG)	2–1 (5–7, 6–1, 6–3)	Ammar Al-Haqbani (KSA)
Rashid Al-Bader (KUW)	2–1 (6–4, 4–6, 6–3)	Batjargalyn Magnai (MGL)
Abhishek Bastola (NEP)	0–2 (0–6, 1–6)	Jurence Mendoza (PHI)

Second round 20 August
Zheng Weiqiang (CHN)	6	7
Li Hei Yin (HKG)	3	5
Dmitry Popko (KAZ)	6	6
Aman Agarwal (AOI)	4	3
Lý Hoàng Nam (VIE)	7^{7}	6
Congsup Congcar (THA)	6^{1}	2
Dawood Hashim (KUW)	2	2
Yang Shao-chi (TPE)	6	6
Qiu Zhuoyang (CHN)	6	2	5
Garvit Batra (AOI)	1	6	7
Roman Khassanov (KAZ)	6	6
Anthony Susanto (INA)	4	3
Teeradon Tortrakul (THA)	6	4	3
Wong Hong Kit (HKG)	1	6	6
Rashid Al-Bader (KUW)	0	1
Jurence Mendoza (PHI)	6	6

Quarterfinals; 21 August
Zheng Weiqiang (CHN)	7^{7}	5	0^{r}
Dmitry Popko (KAZ)	6^{5}	7	1
Lý Hoàng Nam (VIE)	7	6
Yang Shao-chi (TPE)	5	4
Garvit Batra (AOI)	6	6
Roman Khassanov (KAZ)	1	1
Wong Hong Kit (HKG)	1	2
Jurence Mendoza (PHI)	6	6

Semifinals; 22 August
Dmitry Popko (KAZ)	5	6^{2}
Lý Hoàng Nam (VIE)	7	7^{7}
Garvit Batra (AOI)	4	7^{7}	0
Jurence Mendoza (PHI)	6	6^{2}	6

Final; 23 August
Lý Hoàng Nam (VIE)	6^{4}	7	7
Jurence Mendoza (PHI)	7^{7}	5	5

=== Girls' singles ===
First round – 17 August
Rutuja Bhosale (AOI)	2–0 (6–0, 6–0)	Olla Mourad (QAT)
Aslesha Lissanevitch (NEP)	0–2 (0–6, 1–6)	Arina Folts (UZB)
Eudice Chong (HKG)	2–0 (6–0, 6–0)	Erdenebatyn Burguljin (MGL)
Phonephathep Philavong (LAO)	2–0 (6–0, 6–0)	Enkhbayaryn Bolor (MGL)
Deria Nur Haliza (INA)	2–0 (6–1, 6–3)	Nethmi Waduge (SRI)
Ng Kwan Yau (HKG)	2–0 (6–1, 6–0)	Shaema Al-Olfi (YEM)

Second round 20 August
Hsu Ching-wen (TPE)	2	6	4
Rutuja Bhosale (AOI)	6	2	6
Arina Folts (UZB)	2	0
Wang Yan (CHN)	6	6
Assiya Dair (KAZ)	6	6
Eudice Chong (HKG)	4	2
Tami Grende (INA)	6	6
Tamachan Momkoonthod (THA)	4	2
Simran Kaur Sethi (AOI)	4	0
Anastassiya Yepisheva (KAZ)	6	6
Phonephathep Philavong (LAO)	0	1
Kamonwan Buayam (THA)	6	6
Huang En-pei (TPE)	3	6^{5}
Deria Nur Haliza (INA)	6	7^{7}
Ng Kwan Yau (HKG)	0	1
Sun Ziyue (CHN)	6	6

Quarterfinals; 21 August
Rutuja Bhosale (AOI)	1	1
Wang Yan (CHN)	6	6
Assiya Dair (KAZ)	6	6
Tami Grende (INA)	2	3
Anastassiya Yepisheva (KAZ)	4	1
Kamonwan Buayam (THA)	6	6
Deria Nur Haliza (INA)	2	1
Sun Ziyue (CHN)	6	6

Semifinals; 22 August
Wang Yan (CHN)	6	6
Assiya Dair (KAZ)	3	3
Kamonwan Buayam (THA)	2	4
Sun Ziyue (CHN)	6	6

Final; 23 August
Wang Yan (CHN)	4	0
Sun Ziyue (CHN)	6	6

=== Mixed doubles ===
First round – 19 August
Armando Soemarno (INA); Tami Grende (INA)	2–0 (6–4, 6–0)	Roman Khassanov (KAZ); Anastassiya Yepisheva (KAZ)
Wu Tung-lin (TPE); Huang En-pei (TPE)	2–1 (6–2, 2–6, 6–3)	Wong Hong Kit (HKG); Ng Kwan Yau (HKG)
Abhishek Bastola (NEP); Aslesha Lissanevitch (NEP)	0–2 (1–6, 0–6)	Li Hei Yin (HKG); Eudice Chong (HKG)
Anthony Susanto (INA); Deria Nur Haliza (INA)	2–0 (6–0, 6–1)	Enkhzayaagiin Tsovoo (MGL); Erdenebatyn Burguljin (MGL)
Ghassan Al-Ansi (YEM); Shaema Al-Olfi (YEM)	0–2 (4–6, 1–6)	Sharmal Dissanayake (SRI); Nethmi Waduge (SRI)

Second round 19–20 August
Zheng Weiqiang (CHN); Sun Ziyue (CHN)	6	6
Armando Soemarno (INA); Tami Grende (INA)	3	4
Abdulla Al-Mahmoud (QAT); Olla Mourad (QAT)	2	2
Jurabek Karimov (UZB); Arina Folts (UZB)	6	6
Teeradon Tortrakul (THA); Kamonwan Buayam (THA)	6	6
Wu Tung-lin (TPE); Huang En-pei (TPE)	3	3
Batjargalyn Magnai (MGL); Enkhbayaryn Bolor (MGL)	1	0
Garvit Batra (AOI); Simran Kaur Sethi (AOI)	6	6
Dmitry Popko (KAZ); Assiya Dair (KAZ)	7	6
Li Hei Yin (HKG); Eudice Chong (HKG)	5	4
Anthony Susanto (INA); Deria Nur Haliza (INA)	3	3
Qiu Zhuoyang (CHN); Wang Yan (CHN)	6	6
Congsup Congcar (THA); Tamachan Momkoonthod (THA)	6	6
Sharmal Dissanayake (SRI); Nethmi Waduge (SRI)	2	3
Aman Agarwal (AOI); Rutuja Bhosale (AOI)	4	4
Yang Shao-chi (TPE); Hsu Ching-wen (TPE)	6	6

Quarterfinals; 21 August
Zheng Weiqiang (CHN); Sun Ziyue (CHN)	6	6
Jurabek Karimov (UZB); Arina Folts (UZB)	1	0
Teeradon Tortrakul (THA); Kamonwan Buayam (THA)	6	6
Garvit Batra (AOI); Simran Kaur Sethi (AOI)	3	2
Dmitry Popko (KAZ); Assiya Dair (KAZ)	1	3
Qiu Zhuoyang (CHN); Wang Yan (CHN)	6	6
Congsup Congcar (THA); Tamachan Momkoonthod (THA)	3	4
Yang Shao-chi (TPE); Hsu Ching-wen (TPE)	6	6

Semifinals; 22 August
Zheng Weiqiang (CHN); Sun Ziyue (CHN)	6	6
Teeradon Tortrakul (THA); Kamonwan Buayam (THA)	3	1
Qiu Zhuoyang (CHN); Wang Yan (CHN)	4	1
Yang Shao-chi (TPE); Hsu Ching-wen (TPE)	6	6

Final; 23 August
Zheng Weiqiang (CHN); Sun Ziyue (CHN)	4	6	6
Yang Shao-chi (TPE); Hsu Ching-wen (TPE)	6	2	2
