= Lý Hoàng Nam =

Vietnamese tennis player

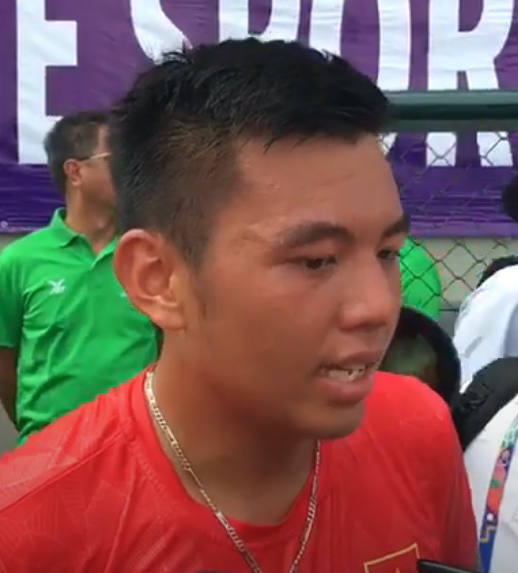
- Lý Hoàng Nam in 2019
- Full name: Lý Hoàng Nam
- Country (sports): Vietnam
- Residence: Bình Dương, Vietnam
- Born: 25 February 1997 (age 29) Gò Dầu, Tây Ninh, Vietnam
- Height: 1.75 m (5 ft 9 in)
- Plays: Right-handed (two-handed backhand)
- Coach: Ivan Miranda
- Prize money: $125,822

Singles
- Career record: 3–4 (at ATP Tour level, Grand Slam level, and in Davis Cup)
- Career titles: 0
- Highest ranking: No. 231 (28 November 2022)
- Current ranking: No. 1168 (25 August 2025)

Grand Slam singles results
- Australian Open Junior: 2R (2015)
- French Open Junior: 3R (2015)
- Wimbledon Junior: 1R (2015)
- US Open Junior: 1R (2015)

Doubles
- Career record: 1–4 (at ATP Tour level, Grand Slam level, and in Davis Cup)
- Career titles: 0
- Highest ranking: No. 415 (24 July 2017)

Grand Slam doubles results
- Australian Open Junior: 1R (2015)
- French Open Junior: 2R (2015)
- Wimbledon Junior: W (2015)
- US Open Junior: 1R (2015)
Medal record
Men's Tennis
Representing Vietnam
Asian Youth Games
Gold medal – first place	2013 Nanjing	Boys' Singles
Southeast Asian Games
Gold medal – first place	2019 Philippines	Singles
Gold medal – first place	2021 Vietnam	Singles
Silver medal – second place	2023 Cambodia	Singles
Silver medal – second place	2023 Cambodia	Team
Bronze medal – third place	2017 Kuala Lumpur	Singles
Bronze medal – third place	2017 Kuala Lumpur	Doubles
Bronze medal – third place	2019 Philippines	Doubles
- Last updated on: 14 April 2024.

Lý Hoàng Nam (born 25 February 1997) is a Vietnamese inactive tennis player and current pickleball player. As of October 2025, he is ranked world No. 19 in the PPA Tour pickleball rankings.

Hoàng Nam has a career high ATP singles ranking of 231 achieved on November 28, 2022. He also has a career high ATP doubles ranking of 385 achieved on 12 November 2018.

He won the 2015 Wimbledon Championships – Boys' doubles title along with his Indian partner Sumit Nagal, defeating Reilly Opelka and Akira Santillan in the final, becoming the first Vietnamese tennis player to win a Grand Slam trophy.

Hoàng Nam represents Vietnam at the Davis Cup, where he has a win–loss record of 25–10.

== Junior Grand Slam finals ==
=== Boys' doubles ===
Outcome	Year	Championship	Surface	Partner	Opponents	Score
Winner	2015	Wimbledon	Grass	(India) Sumit Nagal	(United States) Reilly Opelka (Japan) Akira Santillan	7–6^{(7–4)}, 6–4

== ATP Challenger and ITF Future/World Tennis Tour finals ==
=== Singles: 22 (11–11) ===
Legend ATP Challenger Tour (0–1) ITF Futures/World Tennis Tour (11–10)	Finals by surface Hard (11–11) Clay (0–0) Grass (0–0)

Result	W–L	Date	Tournament	Tier	Surface	Opponent	Score
Win	1–0	Sep 2016	Vietnam F5, Thủ Dầu Một	Futures	Hard	(Japan) Masato Shiga	6–4, 6–2
Win	2–0	Jun 2017	Thailand F3, Hua Hin	Futures	Hard	(France) Yannick Jankovits	2–6, 7–6^{(7–5)}, 6–4
Loss	2–1	Nov 2017	Vietnam F2, Thủ Dầu Một	Futures	Hard	(United Kingdom) Jonathan Gray	6–7^{(4–7)}, 3–6
Loss	2–2	Mar 2018	India F3, Chandigarh	Futures	Hard	(India) Prajnesh Gunneswaran	3–6, 4–6
Loss	2–3	May 2018	Vietnam F1, Thừa Thiên Huế	Futures	Hard	(Chinese Taipei) Tseng Chun-hsin	3–6, 6–7^{(0–7)}
Loss	2–4	Oct 2018	Vietnam F4, Tây Ninh	Futures	Hard	(Russia) Roman Safiullin	6–7^{(7–9)}, 4–6
Loss	2–5	Nov 2018	Vietnam F5, Tây Ninh	Futures	Hard	(Russia) Roman Safiullin	6–7^{(5–7)}, 4–6
Loss	2–6	Oct 2019	M25 Tây Ninh, Vietnam	World Tennis Tour	Hard	(United States) Daniel Nguyen	3–6, 5–7
Win	3–6	Oct 2021	M15 Sharm El Sheikh, Egypt	World Tennis Tour	Hard	(Lebanon) Hady Habib	6–2, 6–4
Win	4–6	Nov 2021	M15 Cancún, Mexico	World Tennis Tour	Hard	(United Kingdom) Giles Hussey	6–4, 6–4
Win	5–6	Dec 2021	M15 Cancún, Mexico	World Tennis Tour	Hard	(New Zealand) Rubin Statham	6–4, 6–4
Loss	5–7	Mar 2022	M25 Toulouse-Balma, France	World Tennis Tour	Hard	(France) Kenny de Schepper	3–6, 3–6
Loss	5–8	Apr 2022	M15 Chiang Rai, Thailand	World Tennis Tour	Hard	(South Korea) Hong Seong-chan	3–6, 6–3, 5–7
Win	6–8	Jun 2022	M15 Tây Ninh, Vietnam	World Tennis Tour	Hard	(Australia) Thomas Fancutt	6–3, 6–4
Win	7–8	Jun 2022	M15 Tây Ninh, Vietnam	World Tennis Tour	Hard	(Czech Republic) Dominik Palán	7–6^{(7–3)}, 6–2
Win	8–8	Jun 2022	M15 Tây Ninh, Vietnam	World Tennis Tour	Hard	(India) Digvijay Pratap Singh	4–6, 7–5, 6–4
Win	9–8	Jul 2022	M15 Kuala Lumpur, Malaysia	World Tennis Tour	Hard	(Japan) Yuta Shimizu	7–5, 6–3
Loss	9–9	Aug 2022	M15 Kuching, Malaysia	World Tennis Tour	Hard	(Japan) Yuta Shimizu	1–6, 2–6
Loss	9–10	Aug 2022	Nonthaburi, Thailand	Challenger	Hard	(Monaco) Valentin Vacherot	3–6, 6–7^{(4–7)}
Loss	9–11	Oct 2022	M25 Tây Ninh, Vietnam	World Tennis Tour	Hard	(Chinese Taipei) Hsu Yu-hsiou	3–6, 2–6
Win	10–11	Oct 2022	M25 Tây Ninh, Vietnam	World Tennis Tour	Hard	(New Zealand) Ajeet Rai	6–4, 6–4
Win	11–11	Feb 2024	M15 Nakhon Si Thammarat, Thailand	World Tennis Tour	Hard	(Netherlands) Sander Jong	6–7^{(4–7)}, 7–6^{(7–2)}, 6–4

=== Doubles: 14 (6–8) ===
Legend ATP Challenger Tour (0–0) ITF Futures Tour (6–8)	Finals by surface Hard (6–8) Clay (0–0) Grass (0–0)

Result	W–L	Date	Tournament	Tier	Surface	Partner	Opponents	Score
Loss	0–1	Sep 2016	Vietnam F4, Thủ Dầu Một	Futures	Hard	(China) Ouyang Bowen	(Malaysia) Ahmed Deedat Abdul Razak (Chinese Taipei) Chiu Yu Hsiang	6–4, 3–6, [7–10]
Win	1–1	Sep 2016	Vietnam F5, Thủ Dầu Một	Futures	Hard	(Vietnam) Nguyễn Hoàng Thiên	(China) Gao Xin (Japan) Shintaro Imai	7–6^{(7–4)}, 7–6^{(7–4)}
Win	2–1	Nov 2016	Vietnam F9, Thủ Dầu Một	Futures	Hard	(Chinese Taipei) Chen Ti	(South Korea) Moon Ju-hae (South Korea) Noh Sang-woo	6–2, 4–6, [10–5]
Loss	2–2	Jun 2017	Singapore F3, Singapore	Futures	Hard	(Japan) Yuichi Ito	(Philippines) Francis Alcantara (Netherlands) Sem Verbeek	6–7^{(3–7)}, 2–6
Win	3–2	Jul 2017	China F12, Shenzhen	Futures	Hard	(China) Sun Fajing	(Philippines) Francis Alcantara (India) Karunuday Singh	6–4, 6–4
Loss	3–3	Oct 2017	Thailand F8, Nonthaburi	Futures	Hard	(Japan) Yuichi Ito	(Thailand) Pruchya Isaro (Japan) Masato Shiga	3–6, 1–6
Loss	3–4	Mar 2018	India F8, Kolkata	Futures	Hard	(Spain) Carlos Boluda-Purkiss	(India) Arjun Kadhe (India) Vijay Sundar Prashanth	2–6, 7–5, [5–10]
Loss	3–5	May 2018	Vietnam F1, Thừa Thiên-Huế	Futures	Hard	(Vietnam) Lê Quốc Khánh	(Hong Kong) Wong Chun-hun (Hong Kong) Yeung Pak-long	6–7^{(5–7)}, 4–6
Win	4–5	May 2018	Vietnam F2, Thừa Thiên-Huế	Futures	Hard	(Vietnam) Nguyễn Văn Phương	(Hong Kong) Wong Chun-hun (Hong Kong) Yeung Pak-long	3–6, 6–3, [10–8]
Win	5–5	Oct 2018	Vietnam F4, Tây Ninh	Futures	Hard	(Vietnam) Lê Quốc Khánh	(Philippines) Francis Alcantara (Sweden) Markus Eriksson	6–4, 6–7^{(6–8)}, [12–10]
Loss	5–6	Nov 2018	Vietnam F5, Tây Ninh	Futures	Hard	(Russia) Roman Safiullin	(Philippines) Francis Alcantara (Sweden) Markus Eriksson	7–5, 4–6, [7–10]
Loss	5–7	Jun 2019	M25 Hong Kong	World Tennis Tour	Hard	(Australia) Blake Ellis	(Japan) Shintaro Imai (Japan) Yuta Shimizu	4–6, 4–6
Win	6–7	Jun 2022	M15 Tây Ninh	World Tennis Tour	Hard	(Philippines) Francis Alcantara	(South Korea) Park Ui-sung (South Korea) Son Ji-hoon	6–3, 6–1
Loss	6–8	Jun 2022	M15 Tây Ninh	World Tennis Tour	Hard	(Vietnam) Lê Quốc Khánh	(Japan) Shohei Chikami (Japan) Masamichi Imamura	5–7, 1–6
