= Kisona Selvaduray =

Malaysian badminton player

Kisona Selvaduray கிசோனா செல்வதுரை
Personal information
- Born: 1 October 1998 (age 28) Seremban, Negeri Sembilan, Malaysia
- Height: 1.62 m (5 ft 4 in)

Sport
- Country: Malaysia
- Sport: Badminton
- Handedness: Right
- Coached by: Ho Khek Mong

Women's singles
- Highest ranking: 41 (25 October 2022)
- Current ranking: 84 (9 June 2026)
- BWF profile
Medal record
Women's badminton
Representing Malaysia
Sudirman Cup
Bronze medal – third place	2021 Vantaa	Mixed team
Asia Team Championships
Bronze medal – third place	2020 Manila	Women's team
Bronze medal – third place	2022 Selangor	Women's team
SEA Games
Gold medal – first place	2019 Philippines	Women's singles
Bronze medal – third place	2019 Philippines	Women's team
World University Games
Bronze medal – third place	2021 Chengdu	Mixed team
Asian Youth Games
Bronze medal – third place	2013 Nanjing	Girls' singles
Asian Junior Championships
Bronze medal – third place	2012 Gimcheon	Mixed team

Kisona Selvaduray (born 1 October 1998) is a Malaysian badminton player. A SEA Games champion and Asian Youth Games bronze medalist, she won the women's singles gold medal at the 2019 SEA Games and a bronze medal in girls' singles at the 2013 Asian Youth Games. At the 2019 SEA Games, she defeated Indonesia's Ruselli Hartawan in the final to successfully retain the women's singles title for Malaysia, following Goh Jin Wei's victory at the 2017 edition.

Kisona was also a member of the Malaysian mixed team that won a bronze medal at the 2021 Sudirman Cup. Individually, she won the women's singles titles at the 2017 Indonesia International, 2017 and 2018 Malaysia International, 2019 Hellas Open, 2019 Sydney International, 2021 Spanish International and 2024 Dutch Open. Her victory at the 2021 Spanish International came against compatriot Goh Jin Wei, while her 2024 Dutch Open triumph ended a three-year title drought and marked her first international title since leaving the Malaysian national badminton setup in December 2022. She also won the women's doubles title at the 2024 Nepal International alongside Yap Rui Chen. At the 2013 Asian Youth Games in Nanjing, she secured her girls' singles bronze medal by defeating fellow Malaysian Ho Yen Mei.

== Career ==
In 2013, Kisona won the bronze medal at the Asian Youth Games beating compatriot Ho Yen Mei in the bronze medal match.

Kisona won her first senior international title at the 2017 Indonesia International, and then won back-to-back Malaysia International Series in 2017 and 2018.

In 2019, Kisona won the International Series event in Greece and Sydney. In December, she won the gold medal in the women's singles at the 2019 SEA Games.

In 2021, Kisona manage to win her first International Challenge title, winning the Spanish International by beating Goh Jin Wei in the final. She was part of the Malaysia team that finished in the semi-finals at the 2021 Sudirman Cup. On 19 December 2022, Academy Badminton Malaysia (ABM) singles coaching director, Wong Choong Hann announced Kisona's resignation from the national set up at the ABM to focus on her recovery and will continue playing as a professional. Following her departure from the national squad, Kisona trained under Mohd Zakry Abdul Latif and Mohamad Arif Abdul Latif at the Sendayan Badminton Club. As of 2024, she is training under Ho Khek Mong at the Ampang Jaya Badminton Club.

=== Injuries ===
In 2014, she suffered a torn anterior cruciate ligament (ACL) at the World Junior Championships in Alor Setar, and was forced to undergo surgery a year later. She also sustained a medial collateral ligament (MCL) and a posterior cruciate ligament (PCL) injury on the right knee.

== Personal life ==
Kisona was born in Seremban, Negeri Sembilan to housewife, S. Valarmathi and police officer, A. Selvaduray. She is the youngest of four siblings. Her love for the badminton grew as she watched her parents and siblings play regularly. She only took the sport seriously when she was studying at SJK (C) Yuk Hwa, Kuala Klawang. Kisona first grabbed attention when she captured the singles and doubles (with Kelly Siow) titles in the 2009 Malaysia Schools Sports Council (MSSM) badminton tournament in Kangar, Perlis when she was only 10-years-old, making her the youngest-ever champion in the history of the tournament.

She is fluent in four languages namely Tamil (mother tongue), Bahasa Malaysia (national language), English and Mandarin. Due to her fluency in Mandarin, she was invited to join the Negeri Sembilan Chinese Recreational Club (NSCRC) after winning the 2019 SEA Games gold medal.

== Achievements ==
=== SEA Games ===
Women's singles
Year	Venue	Opponent	Score	Result	Ref.
2019	Muntinlupa Sports Complex, Metro Manila, Philippines	(Indonesia) Ruselli Hartawan	20–22, 21–14, 21–13	Gold	

=== Asian Youth Games ===
Girls' singles
Year	Venue	Opponent	Score	Result	Ref.
2013	Nanjing Sport Institute, Nanjing, China	(Malaysia) Ho Yen Mei	21–15, 23–21	Bronze	

=== BWF International Challenge/Series (8 titles) ===
Women's singles
Year	Tournament	Opponent	Score	Result	Ref.
2017	Indonesia International	(Indonesia) Gregoria Mariska Tunjung	10–21, 21–16, 21–19	(gold) Winner	
2017	Malaysia International	(Malaysia) Lee Ying Ying	16–21, 21–15, 21–17	(gold) Winner	
2018	Malaysia International	(Chinese Taipei) Liang Ting-yu	14–21, 21–7, 21–19	(gold) Winner	
2019	Hellas Open	(Myanmar) Thet Htar Thuzar	21–14, 21–9	(gold) Winner	
2019	Sydney International	(Japan) Shiori Ebihara	21–18, 21–13	(gold) Winner	
2021	Spanish International	(Malaysia) Goh Jin Wei	21–14, 21–19	(gold) Winner	
2024	Dutch Open	(Azerbaijan) Keisha Fatimah Azzahra	21–14, 21–16	(gold) Winner	

Women's doubles
Year	Tournament	Partner	Opponent	Score	Result
2024	Nepal International	(Malaysia) Yap Rui Chen	(Thailand) Kodchaporn Chaichana (Thailand) Pannawee Polyiam	21–13, 21–4	(gold) Winner

BWF International Challenge tournament
BWF International Series tournament
BWF Future Series tournament

== Awards ==
Year	Award	Category	Result
2024	Malaysian Indian Badminton Association (MIBA)	International High Performance Player Achievement Platinum Award	Won
