= Sri Lanka at the 2013 Asian Youth Games =

- IOC code: SRI
- NOC: National Olympic Committee of Sri Lanka

in Nanjing
- Competitors: 37 in 8 sports
- Flag bearer: Sharmal Dissanayake
- Medals: Gold 0 Silver 1 Bronze 5 Total 6

Asian Youth Games appearances
- 2009; 2013; 2025

Sri Lanka participated in the 2013 Asian Youth Games in Nanjing, China. The team consisted of 37 athletes, who competed in eight different sports. The team was overseen by fifteen officials.

== Athletics ==
The Sri Lankan team consists of 10 athletes.
(q – qualified, NM – no mark, SB – season best PB – personal best)

Boys'
Track events

Athlete	Event	Heats		Semifinals		Final	
Athlete	Event	Time	Rank	Time	Rank	Time	Rank
Arosh Kariyawasam	100 metres	11.35 q	13	11.08 q	6	11.19	6
Isuru Wijerathna	200 metres	23.29 Q	15	DNF'		did not advance	
Shehan lakshitha Fernando	400 metres					50.51 PB	5
Akila Ravisanka	110 metres hurdle	14.52 Q PB	5			13.99 PB	2nd place, silver medalist(s)
Anuradha Vidushanka	400 metres hurdle	54.65 Q PB	2			54.05 PB	3rd place, bronze medalist(s)

Field event

Athlete	Event	Final	
Athlete	Event	Height	Rank
Udantha Nawarathna	High jump	1.90	6

Girls'
Track events

Athlete	Event	Heats		Semifinals		Final	
Athlete	Event	Time	Rank	Time	Rank	Time	Rank
Chanchala Dissanayake	100 metres	12.72 q PB	12	12.72	14	Did not advance	
Nirmali Madushika	400 metres	56.62 Q	2			55.96 PB	3rd place, bronze medalist(s)
Dilhani Fernando	800 metres	2:14.16 Q PB	2			2:15.72	3rd place, bronze medalist(s)
Dilhani Fernando	1500 metres					5:04.17	11

Field event

Athlete	Event	Preliminaries		Final	
Athlete	Event	Length	Rank	Length	Rank
Kumuduli Wijesiriwardane	Long jump	5.32 q	10	5.08	11

== Rugby sevens ==
Sri Lanka's rugby team consists of 12 athletes.

Roster

- Kevin Dixon
- Omalka Gunaratne
- Gayashan Gunathilake
- Lasidu Karunatilaka
- Adrian Kurumbalapitiya
- Dilan Neuman
- Thakshina Nonis
- Mohamed Salih
- Ramesh Thewara
- Indunil Warusavithana
- George Weerakoon
- Wiraj Weerasekara

Pool B

Team	Pld	W	D	L	PF	PA	PD	Pts
Hong Kong	3	3	0	0	108	5	+103	12
Sri Lanka	3	2	0	1	78	29	+49	9
China	3	1	0	2	50	53	–3	6
Philippines	3	0	0	3	0	149	–149	3

August 17, 2013
17:40

China	0 – 31	Sri Lanka
	Report

Sports Park Rugby Field, Nanjing

August 18, 2013
15:00

Hong Kong	29 – 0	Sri Lanka
	Report

Sports Park Rugby Field, Nanjing

August 18, 2013
17:20

Sri Lanka	47 – 0	Philippines
	Report

Sports Park Rugby Field, Nanjing

Quarterfinals

August 19, 2013
11:00

Sri Lanka	17 – 24	Chinese Taipei
	Report

Sports Park Rugby Field, Nanjing

Fifth to Eighth placement

August 19, 2013
15:40

Philippines	5– 42	Sri Lanka
	Report

Sports Park Rugby Field, Nanjing

Fifth place match

August 19, 2013
18:20

Sri Lanka	24– 5	China
	Report

Sports Park Rugby Field, Nanjing

== Shooting ==
Sri Lanka has qualified 3 shooters.

Athlete	Event	Qualification		Final	
Athlete	Event	Points	Rank	Points	Rank
Koen Odayar	Boys' 10 m air rifle	582.3	34	did not advance	
Kaushan Samaranayake	Boys' Trap	74	16	did not advance	
Praneetta Vasudevan	Girls' 10 m air rifle	401.8	19	did not advance	

== Squash ==
Sri Lanka has qualified two squash athletes.

Boy

Event	Athlete(s)	First Round	Round of 16	Quarterfinal	Semifinal	Final	
Event	Athlete(s)	Opposition Result	Opposition Result	Opposition Result	Opposition Result	Opposition Result	Rank
Ravindu Laksiri	Singles		Muhammad Tastaftyan (INA); W 11-5, 11-9, 11-7	Mohammad Mohd Kamal (MAS); L 7-11, 3-11, 9-11	did not advance		=5

Girl

Event	Athlete(s)	First Round	Quarterfinal	Semifinal	Final	
Event	Athlete(s)	Opposition Result	Opposition Result	Opposition Result	Opposition Result	Rank
Mihiliya Methsarani	Singles	Maudy Nadiyah (INA); W 11-8, 11-6, 11-4	Mohammad Mohd Kamal (MAS); W 5-11, 5-11, 11-3, 11-9, 11-7	Vanessa Gnanasigamani (MAS); L 0-11, 5-11, 9-11	Did Not Advance	3rd place, bronze medalist(s)

== Swimming ==
Boy

Athlete	Event	Heat		Semifinal		Final	
Athlete	Event	Time	Rank	Time	Rank	Time	Rank
Matthew Abeysinghe	100 m freestyle	52.43 Q	3	52.42 Q	3	51.52	3rd place, bronze medalist(s)
Matthew Abeysinghe	200 m freestyle	1:55.67	9	—		did not advance	
Matthew Abeysinghe	100 m butterfly	57.67 Q	8	56.90	9	did not advance	

Girl

Athlete	Event	Heat		Semifinal		Final	
Athlete	Event	Time	Rank	Time	Rank	Time	Rank
Machiko Raheem	100 m freestyle	59.49 Q	3	59.90	10	did not advance	
Machiko Raheem	200 m freestyle	2:11.18	10	—		did not advance	
Machiko Raheem	200 m backstroke	2:33.17	12	—		did not advance	

== Table tennis ==
Sri Lanka has qualified four athletes in table tennis.

Boys'

Athlete	Event	Round Robin			Playoffs	Playoffs	Round of 16	Quarterfinals	Semifinals	Final	
Athlete	Event	Match 1	Match 2	Match 3	Playoffs	Playoffs	Round of 16	Quarterfinals	Semifinals	Final	
Athlete	Event	Opposition Result	Opposition Result	Opposition Result	Opposition Result	Opposition Result	Opposition Result	Opposition Result	Opposition Result	Opposition Result	Rank
Thilina Waththe Gedara	Singles	Bilegjargal Purevnyam (MGL); W 3 - 0	Liang Jingkun (CHN); L 0 - 3		Ali Alkhadrawi (KSA); L 1 - 3	did not advance					
Imesh Ranasingha	Singles	Bishal Gurung (BHU); W 3 - 0	Hong Khanh Ta (VIE); W 3 - 2	Chien-tu Huang (TPE); L 0 - 3	Khuslen Otgontugs (MGL); W 3 - 0	Supanut Wisutmaythangkoon (THA); L 0 - 3	did not advance				

Girls'

Athlete	Event	Round Robin			Round of 32	Round of 16	Quarterfinals	Semifinals	Final	
Athlete	Event	Match 1	Match 2	Match 3	Round of 32	Round of 16	Quarterfinals	Semifinals	Final	
Athlete	Event	Opposition Result	Opposition Result	Opposition Result	Opposition Result	Opposition Result	Opposition Result	Opposition Result	Opposition Result	Rank
Ruvini Kannangara	Singles	Manita Chitrakar (NEP); W 3 - 0	Ayane Morita (JPN); L 0 - 3		Yuliya Ryabova (KAZ); L 1 - 3	Did not advance				
Umaya Akalahandi	Singles	Yee Herng Hwee (SIN); L 0 - 3	Orawan Paranang (THA); L 0 - 3	Patricia Homsy (LIB); W 3 - 1	Did not advance					

== Tennis ==
Sri Lanka has qualified two athletes in tennis.

Boy

Athlete	Event	Round of 32	Round of 16	Quarterfinals	Semifinals	Final / BM	
Athlete	Event	Opposition Score	Opposition Score	Opposition Score	Opposition Score	Opposition Score	Rank
Sharmal Dissanayake	Singles	Agarwal (IND); L 2–6, 6–3, 3–6	did not advance				

Girl

Athlete	Event	Round of 32	Round of 16	Quarterfinals	Semifinals	Final / BM	
Athlete	Event	Opposition Score	Opposition Score	Opposition Score	Opposition Score	Opposition Score	Rank
Nethmi Waduge	Singles	Haliza (INA); L 1–6, 3–6	did not advance				

Mixed Doubles

Athlete	Event	Round of 32	Round of 16	Quarterfinals	Semifinals	Final / BM	
Athlete	Event	Opposition Score	Opposition Score	Opposition Score	Opposition Score	Opposition Score	Rank
Sharmal Dissanayake; Nethmi Waduge	Singles	Al-Ansi / Al-Olfi (YEM); W 6–4, 6–1	Congcar / Momkoonthod (THA); L 2–6, 3–6	did not advance			

== Weightlifting ==
Sri Lanka has qualified two athletes.

Boy

Athlete	Event	Snatch		Clean & Jerk		Total	Rank
Athlete	Event	Result	Rank	Result	Rank	Total	Rank
Isuru Senadeera	−85 kg	110	6	135	6	245	6

Girl

Athlete	Event	Snatch		Clean & Jerk		Total	Rank
Athlete	Event	Result	Rank	Result	Rank	Total	Rank
Dinuda Abeysekara	−48 kg	58	8	75	7	133	7
