= Badminton at the 2013 Asian Youth Games =

- Venue: Sport Institute Gymnasium
- Dates: 17–21 August 2013

Badminton at the 2013 Asian Youth Games was held in Sport Institute Gymnasium, Nanjing, China between 17 and 21 August 2013.

== Medalists ==
Event	Gold	Silver	Bronze
Boys' singles	Lin Guipu; China	Lee Cheuk Yiu; Hong Kong	Shi Yuqi; China
Girls' singles	Qin Jinjing; China	Busanan Ongbamrungphan; Thailand	Kisona Selvaduray; Malaysia
Mixed doubles	Japan; Minoru Koga; Akane Yamaguchi	Thailand; Dechapol Puavaranukroh; Puttita Supajirakul	China; Shi Yuqi; Chen Yufei

== Medal table ==
Rank	Nation	Gold	Silver	Bronze	Total
1	China (CHN)	2	0	2	4
2	Japan (JPN)	1	0	0	1
3	Thailand (THA)	0	2	0	2
4	Hong Kong (HKG)	0	1	0	1
5	Malaysia (MAS)	0	0	1	1
Totals (5 entries)		3	3	3	9

== Results ==
=== Boys' singles ===
1/16 finals – 17 August
Lai Yu-hua (TPE)	WO	Dipesh Dhami (NEP)
Đỗ Tuấn Đức (VIE)	0–2 (19–21, 13–21)	Muhammad Bayu Pangisthu (INA)
Khaitmurat Kulmatov (KAZ)	0–2 (7–21, 6–21)	Lin Guipu (CHN)
Alvin Morada (PHI)	0–2 (13–21, 18–21)	Minoru Koga (JPN)
Ayman Ibn Jaman (BAN)	2–0 (21–10, 21–15)	Qasim Mohammed (IRQ)
Seo Seung-jae (KOR)	0–2 (17–21, 21–23)	Satheishtharan Ramachandran (MAS)
Liu Wei-chi (TPE)	0–2 (17–21, 16–21)	Shi Yuqi (CHN)
Ri Kum-song (PRK)	0–2 (19–21, 15–21)	Dechapol Puavaranukroh (THA)
Ali Muafaq (IRQ)	2–0 (21–14, 21–11)	Denis Serebryakov (KAZ)
Phạm Cao Cường (VIE)	0–2 (20–22, 14–21)	Lee Cheuk Yiu (HKG)
Shiyam Rishwan (MDV)	0–2 (14–21, 15–21)	Cheng Phor Rom (CAM)

1/8 finals 18 August
Cheam June Wei (MAS)	21	19	16
Lai Yu-hua (TPE)	19	21	21
Yonny Chung (HKG)	15	18
Muhammad Bayu Pangisthu (INA)	21	21
Adulrach Namkul (THA)	14	16
Lin Guipu (CHN)	21	21
Minoru Koga (JPN)	21	21
Ayman Ibn Jaman (BAN)	8	3
Satheishtharan Ramachandran (MAS)	18	17
Shi Yuqi (CHN)	21	21
Dechapol Puavaranukroh (THA)	6	14
Jonatan Christie (INA)	21	21
Ali Muafaq (IRQ)	11	8
Lee Cheuk Yiu (HKG)	21	21
Cheng Phor Rom (CAM)	11	9
Mark Alcala (PHI)	21	21

Quarterfinals; 19 August
Lai Yu-hua (TPE)	21	23
Muhammad Bayu Pangisthu (INA)	18	21
Lin Guipu (CHN)	21	21
Minoru Koga (JPN)	16	11
Shi Yuqi (CHN)	21	23
Jonatan Christie (INA)	10	21
Lee Cheuk Yiu (HKG)	21	21
Mark Alcala (PHI)	14	15

Semifinals; 20 August
Lai Yu-hua (TPE)	9	13
Lin Guipu (CHN)	21	21
Shi Yuqi (CHN)	12	21	19
Lee Cheuk Yiu (HKG)	21	16	21

Gold medal 21 August
Lin Guipu (CHN)	24	21
Lee Cheuk Yiu (HKG)	22	14
Bronze medal
Lai Yu-hua (TPE)	15	15
Shi Yuqi (CHN)	21	21

=== Girls' singles ===
1/16 finals – 17 August
Maisa Fathuhulla Ismail (MDV)	1–2 (19–21, 21–19, 11–21)	Zarina Murzabekova (KAZ)
Kim Un-jong (PRK)	0–2 (16–21, 9–21)	Ki Bo-hyun (KOR)
Fitriani (INA)	0–2 (17–21, 13–21)	Li Min-hsuan (TPE)
Eleanor Inlayo (PHI)	2–1 (14–21, 21–9, 21–8)	Ker Pichchhoravy (CAM)
Nguyễn Thùy Linh (VIE)	WO	Sichhya Shrestha (NEP)
Puttita Supajirakul (THA)	2–0 (21–3, 21–5)	Phuntsho Choden Thingh (BHU)
Ng Tsz Yau (HKG)	0–2 (11–21, 7–21)	Kisona Selvaduray (MAS)
Lee Chia-hsin (TPE)	2–0 (21–9, 21–6)	Yelizaveta Tkachenko (KAZ)
Ruselli Hartawan (INA)	0–2 (18–21, 19–21)	Qin Jinjing (CHN)

1/8 finals 18 August
Busanan Ongbamrungphan (THA)	21	21
Zarina Murzabekova (KAZ)	2	2
Chen Yufei (CHN)	21	21
Ki Bo-hyun (KOR)	12	14
Ho Yen Mei (MAS)	21	21
Li Min-hsuan (TPE)	13	17
Yeo Jia Min (SIN)	21	21
Eleanor Inlayo (PHI)	14	11
Nguyễn Thùy Linh (VIE)	17	18
Puttita Supajirakul (THA)	21	21
Kisona Selvaduray (MAS)	11	21	21
Akane Yamaguchi (JPN)	21	10	18
Lee Chia-hsin (TPE)	22	21
Joella de Vera (PHI)	20	4
Qin Jinjing (CHN)	21	22
Liang Xiaoyu (SIN)	11	20

Quarterfinals; 19 August
Busanan Ongbamrungphan (THA)	21	23
Chen Yufei (CHN)	19	21
Ho Yen Mei (MAS)	15	21	21
Yeo Jia Min (SIN)	21	19	10
Puttita Supajirakul (THA)	8	13
Kisona Selvaduray (MAS)	21	21
Lee Chia-hsin (TPE)	21	16	12
Qin Jinjing (CHN)	14	21	21

Semifinals; 20 August
Busanan Ongbamrungphan (THA)	21	21
Ho Yen Mei (MAS)	8	5
Kisona Selvaduray (MAS)	16	17
Qin Jinjing (CHN)	21	21

Gold medal 21 August
Busanan Ongbamrungphan (THA)	21	17	16
Qin Jinjing (CHN)	19	21	21
Bronze medal
Ho Yen Mei (MAS)	15	21
Kisona Selvaduray (MAS)	21	23

=== Mixed doubles ===
1/16 finals – 17 August
Mark Alcala (PHI); Eleanor Inlayo (PHI)	2–0 (21–5, 21–10)	Ri Kum-song (PRK); Kim Un-jong (PRK)
Denis Serebryakov (KAZ); Zarina Murzabekova (KAZ)	0–2 (2–21, 9–21)	Shi Yuqi (CHN); Chen Yufei (CHN)
Jonatan Christie (INA); Ruselli Hartawan (INA)	2–0 (21–18, 21–14)	Đỗ Tuấn Đức (VIE); Nguyễn Thùy Linh (VIE)
Cheam June Wei (MAS); Ho Yen Mei (MAS)	2–0 (29–27, 24–22)	Lin Guipu (CHN); Qin Jinjing (CHN)
Dipesh Dhami (NEP); Sichhya Shrestha (NEP)	WO	Shiyam Rishwan (MDV); Maisa Fathuhulla Ismail (MDV)

1/8 finals 18 August
Dechapol Puavaranukroh (THA); Puttita Supajirakul (THA)	21	21
Liu Wei-chi (TPE); Li Min-hsuan (TPE)	11	6
Muhammad Bayu Pangisthu (INA); Fitriani (INA)	21	14	23
Mark Alcala (PHI); Eleanor Inlayo (PHI)	15	21	21
Seo Seung-jae (KOR); Ki Bo-hyun (KOR)	26	26
Satheishtharan Ramachandran (MAS); Kisona Selvaduray (MAS)	24	24
Cheng Phor Rom (CAM); Ker Pichchhoravy (CAM)	9	6
Shi Yuqi (CHN); Chen Yufei (CHN)	21	21
Jonatan Christie (INA); Ruselli Hartawan (INA)	12	12
Minoru Koga (JPN); Akane Yamaguchi (JPN)	21	21
Cheam June Wei (MAS); Ho Yen Mei (MAS)	18	21	21
Yonny Chung (HKG); Ng Tsz Yau (HKG)	21	18	19
Shiyam Rishwan (MDV); Maisa Fathuhulla Ismail (MDV)	8	10
Alvin Morada (PHI); Joella de Vera (PHI)	21	21
Khaitmurat Kulmatov (KAZ); Yelizaveta Tkachenko (KAZ)	12	8
Lai Yu-hua (TPE); Lee Chia-hsin (TPE)	21	21

Quarterfinals; 19 August
Dechapol Puavaranukroh (THA); Puttita Supajirakul (THA)	21	21
Muhammad Bayu Pangisthu (INA); Fitriani (INA)	7	9
Seo Seung-jae (KOR); Ki Bo-hyun (KOR)	19	21	10
Shi Yuqi (CHN); Chen Yufei (CHN)	21	11	21
Minoru Koga (JPN); Akane Yamaguchi (JPN)	21	23
Cheam June Wei (MAS); Ho Yen Mei (MAS)	18	21
Alvin Morada (PHI); Joella de Vera (PHI)	21	16	18
Lai Yu-hua (TPE); Lee Chia-hsin (TPE)	19	21	21

Semifinals; 20 August
Dechapol Puavaranukroh (THA); Puttita Supajirakul (THA)	21	21
Shi Yuqi (CHN); Chen Yufei (CHN)	18	19
Minoru Koga (JPN); Akane Yamaguchi (JPN)	21	21
Lai Yu-hua (TPE); Lee Chia-hsin (TPE)	11	17

Gold medal 21 August
Dechapol Puavaranukroh (THA); Puttita Supajirakul (THA)	19	21	17
Minoru Koga (JPN); Akane Yamaguchi (JPN)	21	9	21
Bronze medal
Shi Yuqi (CHN); Chen Yufei (CHN)	21	21
Lai Yu-hua (TPE); Lee Chia-hsin (TPE)	16	13
