= Nguyễn Trần Anh Tuấn =

Vietnamese weightlifter (born 1998)

Personal information
- Citizenship: Vietnamese
- Born: 22 February 1998 (age 28)

Sport
- Country: Vietnam
- Sport: Weightlifting
- Weight class: 55 kg
Medal record
Representing Vietnam
World Championships
Bronze medal – third place	2024 Manama	61 kg
Asian Championships
Silver medal – second place	2022 Manama	61 kg
Youth Olympic Games
Silver medal – second place	2014 Nanjing	56 kg
Asian Youth Games
Silver medal – second place	2013 Nanjing	56 kg

Nguyễn Trần Anh Tuấn is a Vietnamese weightlifter. He represented Vietnam at the 2019 World Weightlifting Championships in the 55 kg category, as well as the 2015 and 2016 Asian Championships.

He won the silver medal in the men's 61 kg event at the 2022 Asian Weightlifting Championships held in Manama, Bahrain.
