= Rugby sevens at the 2013 Asian Youth Games =

- Venue: Sports Park Rugby Field
- Dates: 17–19 August 2013

Rugby sevens at the 2013 Asian Youth Games was held at the Youth Olympic Sports Park Rugby Field, Nanjing, China from August 17 to 19, 2013.

== Medalists ==
Event	Gold	Silver	Bronze
Boys	Hong Kong; Andrew Purton; Tang Cheuk Hang; Ron Siew; Cameron Smith; Daniel Archer; Elliot Webb; Jack Combes; Liam Owens; James Christie; Hugo Chui; Oscar Kurten; Dominic Lam	Thailand; Wuttipong Sakulthianthong; Sorawit Lertlamsakul; Napat Sirithranon; Attarit Tekjinda; Pitpong Plybua; Wuttikorn Kaewkhiao; Warintorn Whanjai; Sarun Thuengcharoen; Naphan Denlampai; Vorawut Punyaratabandhu; Supanut Chuencheevajaroen; Adithep Keatpattanachai	Japan; Tatsuhiro Nagai; Toshiki Kuwayama; Ryosuke Funahashi; Naoto Saito; Koki Takeyama; Shimin Kohara; Kento Nakai; Kohei Hanada; Kodai Sato; Eiya Miyazaki
Girls	Japan; Ayano Sakurai; Yuki Oyokawa; Wasana Fukushima; Yumeno Noda; Minori Yamamoto; Yuki Ito; Shiho Ugawa; Raichel Bativakalolo; Hibiki Niihara; Yukari Tateyama	China; Shen Yingying; Yan Meiling; Li Tian; Liu Xiaoqian; Wang Tingting; Ling Chen; Lü Hewen; Wang Guiyue; Xing Jie; Song Ya; Duan Yachen; Wu Fan	Hong Kong; Francesca Wood; Hannah Turley; Lee Tsz Ting; Grace Mann; Elise Overton; Rachel Fong; Courtney Cox; Aileen Ryan; Cathy Chan; Victoria Robertson; Alexandra Middleton; Eleanor Ngan

== Medal table ==
Rank	Nation	Gold	Silver	Bronze	Total
1	Hong Kong (HKG)	1	0	1	2
1	Japan (JPN)	1	0	1	2
3	China (CHN)	0	1	0	1
3	Thailand (THA)	0	1	0	1
Totals (4 entries)		2	2	2	6

== Results ==
=== Boys ===
==== Preliminary round ====
===== Pool A =====
Pos	Team	Pld	W	D	L	PF	PA	PD	Pts
1	Thailand	4	3	1	0	84	38	+46	14
2	Japan	4	3	0	1	116	43	+73	13
3	Chinese Taipei	4	2	1	1	79	73	+6	11
4	South Korea	4	0	1	3	42	81	−39	5
5	Kazakhstan	4	0	1	3	21	107	−86	5

Source: Results

17 August
16:10

Japan	38–0	Kazakhstan
Try: Nakai 2' m Kohara (2) 6' m, 7' c Takeyama 8' c Sato 12' c Miyazaki 13' c Con: Nakai (1); Takeyama (1); Sato (2)

Sports Park Rugby Field, Nanjing
Referee: Wu Zhihong (China)

17 August
16:30

Chinese Taipei	19–19	Thailand
Try: Lo 5' m Chang 7+' c Du 14+' c Con: Lin C. (2)		Try: Kaewkhiao (2) 3' c, 14+' m Sirithranon 12' c Con: Kaewkhiao (2)

Sports Park Rugby Field, Nanjing
Referee: Seo In-soo (South Korea)

17 August
19:00

Japan	26–0	South Korea
Try: Funahashi 3' c Takeyama (2) 6' m, 13' c Kohara 8' c Con: Takeyama (3)

Sports Park Rugby Field, Nanjing
Referee: Azhar Yusof (Singapore)

17 August
19:20

Chinese Taipei	24–0	Kazakhstan
Try: Du (2) 1' c, 14+' c Chang 7' m Chen 7+' m Con: Lin C. (2)

Sports Park Rugby Field, Nanjing
Referee: Just Wang (Singapore)

18 August
11:20

Thailand	24–0	Kazakhstan
Try: Sakulthianthong (3) 1' c, 7' m, 10' c Sirithranon 2' m Con: Plybua (1); Kaewkhiao (1)

Sports Park Rugby Field, Nanjing
Referee: Azhar Yusof (Singapore)

18 August
11:40

Chinese Taipei	17–14	South Korea
Try: Tien 3' m Chen 8' m Chang 12' c Con: Lin C. (1)		Try: Baeg 6' c Lee 8' c Con: Kang M. (2)

Sports Park Rugby Field, Nanjing
Referee: Just Wang (Singapore)

18 August
16:40

Japan	12–24	Thailand
Try: Kohara 3' c Takeyama 12' m Con: Takeyama (1)		Try: Whanjai (2) 2' m, 13' c Keatpattanachai 5' m Sakulthianthong 7' c Con: Kaewkhiao (2)

Sports Park Rugby Field, Nanjing
Referee: Chris Linwood (New Zealand)

18 August
17:00

South Korea	21–21	Kazakhstan
Try: Kang M. (3) 7+' c, 9' c, 10' c Con: Kang M. (3)		Try: Drozdov 3' c Gussev 5' c Zabrodin 14' c Con: Drozdov (1); Gussev (2)

Sports Park Rugby Field, Nanjing
Referee: Shuhei Kubo (Japan)

18 August
19:00

South Korea	7–17	Thailand
Try: Lee 8' 1 Con: Kang M. (1)		Try: Whanjai 9' m Kaewkhiao 13' c Plybua 14' m Con: Plybua (1)

Sports Park Rugby Field, Nanjing
Referee: Wu Zhihong (China)

18 August
19:20

Japan	40–19	Chinese Taipei
Try: Kohara 2' c Takeyama (2) 5' c, 14' c Kuwayama 9' m Nagai 10' c Miyazaki 11' c Con: Takeyama (5)		Try: Lin C. 4' c Du 7' c Chang 14+' m Con: Lin C. (2)

Sports Park Rugby Field, Nanjing
Referee: Supaporn Gomenake (Thailand)

===== Pool B =====
Pos	Team	Pld	W	D	L	PF	PA	PD	Pts
1	Hong Kong	3	3	0	0	108	5	+103	12
2	Sri Lanka	3	2	0	1	78	29	+49	9
3	China	3	1	0	2	50	53	−3	6
4	Philippines	3	0	0	3	0	149	−149	3

Source: Results

17 August
17:20

Hong Kong	57–0	Philippines
Try: Lam (2) 1' c, 6' c Christie (2) 4' m, 5' m Kurten (2) 8' c, 14' c Chui 9' c Archer 10' m Combes 14+' c Con: Owens (1); Christie (1); Webb (3); Chui (1)

Sports Park Rugby Field, Nanjing
Referee: Chris Linwood (New Zealand)

17 August
17:40

China	0–31	Sri Lanka
		Try: Dixon (2) 7+' c, 11' c Gunathilake 11' m Nonis 13' c Weerakoon 14' m Con: Gunathilake (1); Indunil (1); Kurumbalapitiya (1)

Sports Park Rugby Field, Nanjing
Referee: Shuhei Kubo (Japan)

18 August
15:00

Hong Kong	29–0	Sri Lanka
Try: Kurten 2' c Siew (2) 5' m, 10' m Chui 6' c Christie 7+' m Con: Webb (2)

Sports Park Rugby Field, Nanjing
Referee: Wu Zhihong (China)

18 August
15:20

China	45–0	Philippines
Try: Zhang (4) 1' c, 4' m, 7' c, 7+' c Zheng 5' c Qiang 13' m Hu 14' c Con: Han (1); Zheng (1); Tong (3)

Sports Park Rugby Field, Nanjing
Referee: Shuhei Kubo (Japan)

18 August
17:20

Sri Lanka	47–0	Philippines
Try: Gunathilake (3) 3' c, 7' c, 7+' m Neuman (2) 5' c, 12' c Weerasekara 9' c Salih 14' c Con: Dixon (3); Indunil (2); Gunathilake (1)

Sports Park Rugby Field, Nanjing
Referee: Eunice Tay (Singapore)

18 August
17:40

Hong Kong	22–5	China
Try: Lam 2' c Chui (2) 3' m, 9' m Christie 12' m Con: Webb (1)		Try: Han 7+' m

Sports Park Rugby Field, Nanjing
Referee: Azhar Yusof (Singapore)

==== Final round ====
Quarterfinals
19 August
Thailand	31
Philippines	0
19 August
Sri Lanka	17
Chinese Taipei	24
19 August
Hong Kong	43
South Korea	12
19 August
Japan	12
China	7

Semifinals
19 August
Thailand	17
Chinese Taipei	0
19 August
Hong Kong	19
Japan	12

Gold medal match
19 August
Thailand	12
Hong Kong	31
Bronze medal match
19 August
Chinese Taipei	7
Japan	33

5–8 placing
19 August
Philippines	5
Sri Lanka	42
19 August
South Korea	7
China	17

5–6 placing
19 August
Sri Lanka	24
China	5
7–8 placing
19 August
Philippines	0
South Korea	48

===== Quarterfinals =====
19 August
10:40

Thailand	31–0	Philippines
Try: Kaewkhiao 4' c Sakulthianthong (2) 5' c, 7' c Chuencheevajaroen 11' m Plybua 13' m Con: Kaewkhiao (2); Plybua (1)

Sports Park Rugby Field, Nanjing
Referee: Liu Hao (China)

19 August
11:00

Sri Lanka	17–24	Chinese Taipei
Try: Dixon (2) 4' m, 12' m Indunil 9' c Con: Gunathilake (1)		Try: Chen 2' m Tien 6' m Lin T. 11' c Chang 14+' c Con: Lin C. (2)

Sports Park Rugby Field, Nanjing
Referee: Wu Zhihong (China)

19 August
11:20

Hong Kong	43–12	South Korea
Try: Lam 1' c Christie (3) 4' m, 7+' m, 12' c Kurten (3) 9' c, 14' m, 14+' c Con: Webb (2); Archer (1); Kurten (1)		Try: Kang M. 5' m Seo 10' c Con: Kang M. (1)

Sports Park Rugby Field, Nanjing
Referee: Shuhei Kubo (Japan)

19 August
11:40

Japan	12–7	China
Try: Kohara 3' m Nakai 12' c Con: Takeyama (1)		Try: Lü 9' c Con: Lü (1)

Sports Park Rugby Field, Nanjing
Referee: Azhar Yusof (Singapore)

===== 5–8 placing =====
19 August
15:40

Philippines	5–42	Sri Lanka
Try: Feleo 13' m		Try: Weerasekara 2' c Dixon (2) 4' c, 6' c Indunil (2) 7' c, 8' c Kurumbalapitiya 7+' c Con: Kurumbalapitiya (4); Dixon (1); Indunil (1)

Sports Park Rugby Field, Nanjing
Referee: Supaporn Gomenake (Thailand)

19 August
16:00

South Korea	7–17	China
Try: Lee 11' c Con: Kang M. (1)		Try: Zhang 3' m Li 9' c Lü 13' m Con: Han (1)

Sports Park Rugby Field, Nanjing
Referee: Chris Linwood (New Zealand)

===== Semifinals =====
19 August
16:40

Thailand	17–0	Chinese Taipei
Try: Kaewkhiao 4' c Sakulthianthong 8' m Plybua 10' m Con: Kaewkhiao (1)

Sports Park Rugby Field, Nanjing
Referee: Shuhei Kubo (Japan)

19 August
17:00

Hong Kong	19–12	Japan
Try: Siew 9' c Christie 10' c Kurten 12' m Con: Owens (2)		Try: Kuwayama 3' m Kohara 6' c Con: Takeyama (1)

Sports Park Rugby Field, Nanjing
Referee: Azhar Yusof (Singapore)

===== 7–8 placing =====
19 August
18:00

Philippines	0–48	South Korea
		Try: Lee (3) 2' c, 7' m, 7+' m Seo (2) 5' m, 10' c Kang M. 8' c Kim S. 11' c Baeg 14+' m Con: Kang M. (3); Kim Y. (1)

Sports Park Rugby Field, Nanjing
Referee: Wu Zhihong (China)

===== 5–6 placing =====
19 August
18:20

Sri Lanka	24–5	China
Try: Weerasekara 1' m Dixon (2) 7+' c, 8' c Indunil 10' m Con: Dixon (1); Indunil (1)		Try: Zhang 5' m

Sports Park Rugby Field, Nanjing
Referee: Chris Linwood (New Zealand)

===== Bronze medal match =====
19 August
19:00

Chinese Taipei	7–33	Japan
Try: Chen 7' c Con: Du (1)		Try: Nakai 2' c Funahashi 4' m Kuwayama 9' c Takeyama 12' c Saito 14+' c Con: Takeyama (4)

Sports Park Rugby Field, Nanjing
Referee: Azhar Yusof (Singapore)

===== Gold medal match =====
19 August
19:50

Thailand	12–31	Hong Kong
Try: Kaewkhiao (2) 5' c, 14' m Con: Plybua (1)		Try: Kurten (2) 7' c, 8' c Siew 10' m Chui 11' m Smith 18' c Con: Christie (1); Owens (1); Smith (1)

Sports Park Rugby Field, Nanjing
Referee: Wu Zhihong (China)

=== Girls ===
==== Preliminary round ====
Pos	Team	Pld	W	D	L	PF	PA	PD	Pts
1	Japan	4	4	0	0	145	5	+140	16
2	China	4	3	0	1	63	31	+32	13
3	Thailand	4	2	0	2	43	74	−31	10
4	Hong Kong	4	1	0	3	51	76	−25	7
5	Kazakhstan	4	0	0	4	7	123	−116	4

Source: Results

17 August
15:30

China	14–0	Thailand
Try: Liu (2) 5' c, 8' c Con: Wang T. (2)

Sports Park Rugby Field, Nanjing
Referee: Eunice Tay (Singapore)

17 August
15:50

Japan	38–5	Hong Kong
Try: Yamamoto (2) 3' c, 11' c Noda (2) 7+' c, 14' m Fukushima 8' c Ito 13' m Con: Fukushima (4)		Try: Ngan 2' m

Sports Park Rugby Field, Nanjing
Referee: Liu Hao (China)

17 August
18:00

China	28–0	Kazakhstan
Try: Liu 1' c Ling 4' c Li 7+' c Song 12' c Con: Wang T. (4)

Sports Park Rugby Field, Nanjing
Referee: Supaporn Gomenake (Thailand)

17 August
18:20

Japan	43–0	Thailand
Try: Ugawa 1' c Bativakalolo 3' c Noda 5' m Yamamoto (2) 7' c, 10' m Fukushima 11' m Niihara 13' c Con: Fukushima (4)

Sports Park Rugby Field, Nanjing
Referee: Wang Haiyang (China)

18 August
10:40

Hong Kong	10–17	Thailand
Try: Fong 10' m Robertson 14+' m		Try: Wandee (2) 1' m, 6' c Nanthaka 9' m Con: Rukrueang (1)

Sports Park Rugby Field, Nanjing
Referee: Seo In-soo (South Korea)

18 August
11:00

Japan	38–0	Kazakhstan
Try: Fukushima 1' c Ugawa (2) 4' c, 6' c Oyokawa 9' c Niihara (2) 12' m, 14' m Con: Fukushima (3); Yamamoto (1)

Sports Park Rugby Field, Nanjing
Referee: Liu Yunfei (China)

18 August
15:40

China	21–5	Hong Kong
Try: Wang T. 2' c Liu (2) 9' c, 13' c Con: Ling (3)		Try: Cox 7+' m

Sports Park Rugby Field, Nanjing
Referee: Seo In-soo (South Korea)

18 August
16:00

Kazakhstan	7–26	Thailand
Try: Abisheva 7' c Con: Abisheva (1)		Try: Jaiping 2' m Wandee 10' c Rukrueang 12' c Yakam 14+' c Con: Jaiping (2); Rukrueang (1)

Sports Park Rugby Field, Nanjing
Referee: Chen Wenyi (China)

18 August
18:20

Kazakhstan	0–31	Hong Kong
		Try: Cox 1' c Mann 5' m Ngan 6' c Robertson 7' c Overton 9' m Con: Lee (3)

Sports Park Rugby Field, Nanjing
Referee: Just Wang (Singapore)

18 August
18:40

China	0–26	Japan
		Try: Yamamoto (2) 1' c, 12' m Bativakaloloo 8' c Ugawa 14' c Con: Fukushima (3)

Sports Park Rugby Field, Nanjing
Referee: Chris Linwood (New Zealand)

==== Final round ====
Semifinals
19 August
Japan	48
Hong Kong	0
19 August
China	17
Thailand	0

Gold medal match
19 August
Japan	28
China	14
Bronze medal match
19 August
Hong Kong	21
Thailand	5

===== Semifinals =====
19 August
15:00

Japan	48–0	Hong Kong
Try: Fukushima 1' c Sakurai (2) 3' c, 6' c Oyokawa 7+' m Bativakalolo (2) 8' m, 9' c Yamamoto 11' m Niihara 13' m Con: Fukushima (3); Tateyama (1)

Sports Park Rugby Field, Nanjing
Referee: Shi Yongjin (China)

19 August
15:20

China	17–0	Thailand
Try: Liu (2) 4' m, 14+' c Wang T. 5' m Con: Ling (1)

Sports Park Rugby Field, Nanjing
Referee: Seo In-soo (South Korea)

===== Bronze medal match =====
19 August
18:40

Hong Kong	21–5	Thailand
Try: Fong (2) 1' c, 8' c Ngan 4' c Con: Lee (3)		Try: Phongsri 14' m

Sports Park Rugby Field, Nanjing
Referee: Just Wang (Singapore)

===== Gold medal match =====
19 August
19:20

Japan	28–14	China
Try: Ugawa (2) 12' c, 15' c Bativakalolo 14' c Fukushima 19' c Con: Fukushima (4)		Try: Liu 4' c Lü 6' c Con: Ling (2)

Sports Park Rugby Field, Nanjing
Referee: Supaporn Gomenake (Thailand)
