= Diving at the 2013 Asian Youth Games =

- Venue: OSC Natatorium
- Dates: 17–18 August 2013

Diving at the 2013 Asian Youth Games was held in the Nanjing OSC Natatorium from 17 August to 18 August 2013 in Nanjing, China.

== Medalists ==
=== Boys ===
Event	Gold	Silver	Bronze
3 m springboard	Zheng Zhiqun; China	Huang Bowen; China	Zeng Tian Yi; Hong Kong
Platform	Yue Qi; China	Zeng Jiajie; China	Ri Hyon-ju; North Korea

=== Girls ===
Event	Gold	Silver	Bronze
3 m springboard	Shen Yi; China	Wang Weijie; China	Kim Su-ji; South Korea
Platform	Song Nam-hyang; North Korea	Loh Zhiayi; Malaysia	Zheng Qi; China

== Medal table ==
Rank	Nation	Gold	Silver	Bronze	Total
1	China (CHN)	3	3	1	7
2	North Korea (PRK)	1	0	1	2
3	Malaysia (MAS)	0	1	0	1
4	Hong Kong (HKG)	0	0	1	1
4	South Korea (KOR)	0	0	1	1
Totals (5 entries)		4	4	4	12

== Results ==
=== Boys ===
==== 3 m springboard ====
17 August

Rank	Athlete	Prel.	Final
1st place, gold medalist(s)	Zheng Zhiqun (CHN)	568.10	607.65
2nd place, silver medalist(s)	Huang Bowen (CHN)	571.50	586.80
3rd place, bronze medalist(s)	Zeng Tian Yi (HKG)	500.30	559.20
4	Danial Sabri (MAS)	487.15	531.40
5	Jonathan Chan (SIN)	470.15	484.65
6	Hasan Qali (KUW)	413.30	451.15
7	Adityo Restu Putra (INA)	410.60	439.25
8	Tri Anggoro Priambodo (INA)	411.75	426.05
9	Mohammad Hamed Bazmi (IRI)	401.45	421.35
10	Grigoriy Shmatko (KAZ)	402.10	412.55
11	Sanat Kabdullayev (KAZ)	381.05	407.75
12	Chalee Dejtanu (THA)	409.70	407.65
13	Ng Wai Hou (MAC)	377.90	
14	Abdulaziz Balghaith (QAT)	367.50	
15	Leong Kam Cheong (MAC)	344.65	

==== Platform ====
18 August

Rank	Athlete	Prel.	Final
1st place, gold medalist(s)	Yue Qi (CHN)	543.35	539.75
2nd place, silver medalist(s)	Zeng Jiajie (CHN)	517.25	517.30
3rd place, bronze medalist(s)	Ri Hyon-ju (PRK)	476.55	477.70
4	Zeng Tian Yi (HKG)	414.20	451.85
5	Nazreen Abdullah (MAS)	437.55	442.70
6	Jonathan Chan (SIN)	414.20	410.40
7	Adityo Restu Putra (INA)	354.35	364.95
8	Theerapa Siriboon (THA)	340.60	358.20
9	Grigoriy Shmatko (KAZ)	321.25	325.70
10	Dương Văn Thành (VIE)	324.85	314.30
11	Sanat Kabdullayev (KAZ)	328.90	305.05
12	Leong Kam Cheong (MAC)	310.50	287.90
13	Ng Wai Hou (MAC)	302.25	

=== Girls ===
==== 3 m springboard ====
18 August

Rank	Athlete	Prel.	Final
1st place, gold medalist(s)	Shen Yi (CHN)	434.25	465.75
2nd place, silver medalist(s)	Wang Weijie (CHN)	424.90	448.20
3rd place, bronze medalist(s)	Kim Su-ji (KOR)	407.30	441.00
4	Loh Zhiayi (MAS)	408.60	434.80
5	Ko Eun-ji (KOR)	400.05	406.75
6	Lo I Teng (MAC)	375.15	403.65
7	Fong Kay Yian (SIN)	356.20	349.25
8	Hsu Shih-han (TPE)	288.15	333.90
9	Dewi Setyaningsih (INA)	312.90	293.95
10	Ngô Phương Mai (VIE)	291.25	265.15
11	Dwi Ramadhani (INA)	238.15	255.15

==== Platform ====
17 August

Rank	Athlete	Prel.	Final
1st place, gold medalist(s)	Song Nam-hyang (PRK)	405.25	421.00
2nd place, silver medalist(s)	Loh Zhiayi (MAS)	406.25	411.90
3rd place, bronze medalist(s)	Zheng Qi (CHN)	424.25	404.85
4	Kim Su-ji (KOR)	352.80	372.00
5	Choe Kyong-yong (PRK)	371.00	368.45
6	Ko Eun-ji (KOR)	352.15	351.70
7	Lo I Teng (MAC)	304.65	319.40
8	Hsu Shih-han (TPE)	305.60	312.55
9	Dewi Setyaningsih (INA)	239.45	258.10
10	Ho Iek Lam (MAC)	222.00	232.25
