= Guo Yiqi =

Chinese fencer (born 1997)

Personal information
- Nationality: Chinese
- Born: 13 February 1997 (age 28)

Sport
- Sport: Fencing

Guo Yiqi (born 13 February 1997) is a Chinese fencer. She competed in the women's team sabre event at the 2020 Summer Olympics.
