= Independent Olympic Athletes at the 2013 Asian Youth Games =

- IOC code: AOI
- NOC: Indian Olympic Association

in Nanjing
- Medals Ranked 10th: Gold 3 Silver 4 Bronze 7 Total 14

Asian Youth Games appearances
- 2009; 2013; 2025

Independent Olympic Athletes is the team of Indian athletes who are competing at the 2013 Asian Youth Games in Nanjing, China, from 16 to 24 August 2013.

== Background ==
Indian athletes participated in the Games under the Olympic flag due to the suspension of the country's National Olympic Committee (NOC). Indian Olympic Association was suspended by the International Olympic Committee due to government interference in the autonomy of the country’s NOC.

== Over-aged athletes ==
The organising committee of the Games, Nanjing Asian Youth Games Organising Committee, barred participation of some Indian athletes who were supposed to compete in the athletics and weightlifting events "because they were above the stipulated age of 17". The incident attracted widespread media coverage and prompted government action. The Ministry of Youth Affairs and Sports "ordered an inquiry to fix responsibility on the officials for the fiasco which had brought embarrassment to the country".

== Athletics ==
Boys'
Track events

Athlete	Event	Heats		Semifinals		Final	
Athlete	Event	Time	Rank	Time	Rank	Time	Rank
Ajay Kumar	1500 metres	N/A				4:05.76	(bronze)
Abhishek Pal	3000 metres	N/A				8:45.72	(bronze)

Girls'
Track events

Athlete	Event	Heats		Semifinals		Final	
Athlete	Event	Time	Rank	Time	Rank	Time	Rank
Anjana Thamake	800 metres	2:13.21	1 Q	N/A		2:11.47 PB	1st place, gold medalist(s)
Ankita Gosavi	100 metres hurdles	14.60	2 Q	N/A		DQ	

Field

Athlete	Events	Heat		Final	
Athlete	Events	Distance	Rank	Distance	Rank
Akshaya Veluchamy	Long jump	5.45	5 Q	5.48 PB	8
Rochelle MacFarlane	Triple jump	N/A		12.38 m PB	2nd place, silver medalist(s)
Meghana Devanga	Shot put	N/A		14.51 m	4
Laxay Sharma	Hammer throw	N/A		43.81 m	6
Pushpa Jakhar	Javelin throw	N/A		45.64 m PB	4

== Judo ==
Boys'

Athlete	Event	Preliminary		Quarterfinal	Semifinal	Final	
Athlete	Event	Opposition Result	Opposition Result	Opposition Result	Opposition Result	Opposition Result	Rank
Vikas Kharb	Boys' −55 kg	Soukphaxay Sithisane (LAO); L 000-100	Did not advance				
Vijay Kumar Yadav	Boys' −66 kg	Ko Jae-Kyoung (KOR); L 000-002	Did not advance				
Vinay Kumar	Boys' −81 kg	Renzo Cazenas (PHI); W 020-000	Lain Htone (MYA); L 000-100	Did not advance			

Girls'

Athlete	Event	Preliminary		Quarterfinal	Semifinal	Final	
Athlete	Event	Opposition Result	Opposition Result	Opposition Result	Opposition Result	Opposition Result	Rank
Mongjam Kabita Devi	Girls' −44 kg	Roaa Shawkara (YEM); W WO	N/A	Kim Eun-Ji (KOR); W 000-000 (GS)	Lin Wan-chu (TPE); L 001-020	Aida Karchayeva (KAZ); W 100-000	(bronze)
Pinky Balhara	Girls' −52 kg	Tseregbaataryn Khulan (MGL); L 000-000	Did not advance				
Mitlesh	Girls' −63 kg	Tursunpasha Nurmetova (UZB); L 000-100	Did not advance				

== Golf ==
Athlete	Event	Rounds			Final		
Athlete	Event	1	2	3	Total	To par	Rank
Manu Gandas	Men's individual strokeplay	70	67	68	205	−11	(silver)
Viraaj Madappa	Men's individual strokeplay	74	79	68	221	+5	9
Aditi Ashok	Women's individual strokeplay	74	75	70	219	+3	10
Ridhima Dilawari	Women's individual strokeplay	72	74	79	225	+9	14

== Shooting ==
Men

Athlete	Event	Qualification		Final	
Athlete	Event	Score	Rank	Score	Rank
Virbhadra Salokhe	10 m air rifle men	612.1	11	Did not advance	
Pratik Borse	10 m air rifle men	609.6	15	Did not advance	
Shainki Nagar	10 m air pistol men	565	6 Q	195.3	(silver)
Samarjit Singh	10 m air pistol men	561	8 Q	134.0	5
Anantjeet Singh Naruka	Skeet men	106	7	Did not advance	
Hamza Sheikh	Skeet men	101	9	Did not advance	
Akash Saharan	Trap men	103	7	Did not advance	
Abhay Singh Rathore	Trap men	101	9	Did not advance	

Women

Athlete	Event	Qualification		Final	
Athlete	Event	Score	Rank	Score	Rank
Mampi Das	10 m air rifle women	412.3	3 Q	122.3	6
Anuradha Khude	10 m air rifle women	404.0	15	Did not advance	
Malaika Goel	10 m air pistol women	375	4 Q	135.7	5
Yashaswini Deswal	10 m air pistol women	373	6 Q	92.8	7
Maheshwari Chauhan	Skeet women	44	6 Q	7	5

== Swimming ==
Boys'

Athlete	Events	Heat		Semifinal		Final	
Athlete	Events	Time	Rank	Time	Rank	Time	Rank
Neil Contractor	50 m freestyle	25.07	5	24.91	8	Did not advance	
Neil Contractor	100 m freestyle	55.00	5	54.25	8	Did not advance	
Neil Contractor	100 m breaststroke	DNS		Did not advance			
Rohit Imoliya	50 m backstroke	28.02	2	27.92	4	27.93	7
Rohit Imoliya	100 m backstroke	1:01.44	4	1:00.54	7	Did not advance	
Rohit Imoliya	200 m backstroke	2:16.95	4	N/A		Did not advance	
Arvind Mani	100 m backstroke	1:00.25	4	59.51	4	59.99	6
Arvind Mani	200 m backstroke	2:12.35	2	N/A		2:10.11	5
Arvind Mani	200 m individual medley	2:14.27	4	N/A		Did not advance	
Likith S. P.	50 m breaststroke	31.78	6	Did not advance			
Likith S. P.	100 m breaststroke	1:09.47	4	1:08.62	8	Did not advance	
Likith S. P.	200 m breaststroke	2:31.07	5	N/A		Did not advance	
Rakshith U. Shetty	50 m butterfly	26.29	3	26.15	4	Did not advance	
Rakshith U. Shetty	100 m butterfly	57.97	4	57.85	6	Did not advance	
Supriya Mondal	50 m butterfly	26.57	5	26.30	6	Did not advance	
Supriya Mondal	100 m butterfly	DNS		Did not advance			
Supriya Mondal	200 m butterfly	2:07.97	3	N/A		2:06.24	6
Arvind Mani; Likith S. P. Supriya Mondal; Rakshith U. Shetty	4 × 100 m freestyle relay	4:04.89	8	N/A		Did not advance	
Arvind Mani; Likith S. P. Supriya Mondal; Neil Contractor	4 × 100 m medley relay	4:10.45	5	N/A		Did not advance	

Girls'

Athlete	Events	Heat		Semifinal		Final	
Athlete	Events	Time	Rank	Time	Rank	Time	Rank
Avantika Chavan	50 m freestyle	27.77	3	27.93	6	Did not advance	
Avantika Chavan	50 m backstroke	32.22	5	31.86	8	Did not advance	
Avantika Chavan	50 m butterfly	30.21	6	29.73	7	Did not advance	
Shivani Kataria	50 m freestyle	27.65	5	27.52	6	Did not advance	
Shivani Kataria	100 m freestyle	59.63	2	59.53	5	59.30	7
Shivani Kataria	200 m freestyle	2:09.84	3	N/A		2:08.32	6
Monique Gandhi	200 m freestyle	2:10.79	2	N/A		2:10.10	7
Monique Gandhi	100 m breaststroke	1:19.63	5	1:19.15	7	Did not advance	
Monique Gandhi	200 m breaststroke	2:57.97	6	N/A		Did not advance	
Jayaveena A. V.	50 m breaststroke	36.72	5	36.90	8	Did not advance	
Jayaveena A. V.	100 m breaststroke	1:20.64	6	Did not advance			
Jayaveena A. V.	200 m breaststroke	2:58.26	5	N/A		Did not advance	
Jayaveena A. V.	200 m individual medley	2:29.68	6	N/A		Did not advance	
Monique Gandhi; Avantika Chavan; Jayaveena A. V. Shivani Kataria	4 × 100 m freestyle relay	4:08.73	5	N/A		Did not advance	

== Squash ==
Individual

Athlete	Event	First Round	Second Round	Quarterfinals	Semifinals	Final	
Athlete	Event	Opposition Result	Opposition Result	Opposition Result	Opposition Result	Opposition Result	Rank
Kush Kumar	Men's individual	Bye	Hamza Alzubaidi (JOR); W 3-0	Cheuk Hin Chris Lo (HKG); W 3-1	Eain Yow Ng (MAS); W 3-1	Mohammad Syafiq Mohd Kamal (MAS); W 3-1	(gold)
Vijay Meena	Men's individual	Bye	Ryunosuke Tsukue (JPN); W 3-0	Tsun Hei Yuen (HKG); L 2-3	Did not advance		
Tanvi Khanna	Women's individual	Momoka Nakahira (JPN); W 3-0	Vanessa Raj Ghanasigamani (MAS); L 0-3	Did not advance			
Harshit Jawanda	Women's individual	Libo Zhou (CHN); W 3-0	Pansy Pui Hei Chan (HKG); L 1-3	Did not advance			

Team

Athletes	Event	Preliminaries Group Stage				Semifinal	Final	
Athletes	Event	Opposition Result	Opposition Result	Opposition Result	Opposition Result	Opposition Result	Opposition Result	Rank
Kush Kumar; Vijay Meena; Madhav Dhingra	Men's team	Pakistan (PAK); W 2-1	Jordan (JOR); W 3-0	South Korea (KOR); W 3-0	China (CHN); W 3-0	Hong Kong (HKG); W 2-1	Malaysia (MAS); L 1-2	(silver)
Adya Advani; Harshit Jawanda; Tanvi Khanna	Women's team	Hong Kong (HKG); L 0-3	Indonesia (INA); W 3-0	N/A		Malaysia (MAS); L 0-2	Did not advance	(bronze)

== Table tennis ==
Athlete	Event	First Round	Quarterfinals	Semifinals	Final	
Athlete	Event	Opposition Result	Opposition Result	Opposition Result	Opposition Result	Rank
Abhishek Yadav	Men's singles	Soroosh Amiri Nia (IRI); W 4–2	Dunley Foo (MAS); W 4–1	Zhendong Fan (CHN); L 2–4	Did not advance	(bronze)
Sutirtha Mukherjee	Women's singles	Seul Lee (KOR); L 0–4	Did not advance			

== Tennis ==
Athlete	Event	First Round	Second Round	Quarterfinals	Semifinals	Final	
Athlete	Event	Opposition Result	Opposition Result	Opposition Result	Opposition Result	Opposition Result	Rank
Aman Agarwal	Boys' singles	Sharmal Dissanayake (SRI); W 6–2, 3–6, 6–3	Dmitriy Popko (KAZ); L 4–6, 3–6	Did not advance			
Garvit Batra	Boys' singles	Abdulla Ahli (UAE); W 6–0, 6–0	Qiu Zhuoyang (CHN); W 1–6, 6–2, 7–5	Roman Khassanov (KAZ); W 6–1, 6–1	Jurence Mendoza (PHI); L 4–6, 7–6, 0–6	Did not advance	(bronze)
Rutuja Bhosale	Girls' singles	Olla Mourad (QAT); W 6–0, 6–0q	Hsu Ching-wen (TPE); W 6–2, 2–6, 6–4	Wang Yan (CHN); L 1–6, 1–6	Did not advance		
Simran Kaur Sethi	Girls' singles	Bye	Anastassiya Yepisheva (KAZ); L 4–6, 0–6	Did not advance			
Garvit Batra, Simran Kaur Sethi	Mixed doubles	Bye	(Mongolia) Batjargalyn Magnai, Enkhbayaryn Bolor(MGL); W 6–1, 6–0	(Thailand) Teeradon Tortrakul, Kamonwan Buayam(THA); L 3–6, 2–6	Did not advance		
Aman Agarwal, Rutuja Bhosale	Mixed doubles	Bye	(Chinese Taipei) Batjargalyn Magnai, Enkhbayaryn Bolor(MGL); L 4–6, 4–6	Did not advance			

== Weightlifting ==
Men's

Athlete	Event	Body weight (kg)	Snatch (kg)	Clean & Jerk (kg)	Total (kg)	Rank
T. Lalchhanhima	56 kg	55.60	100	128	228	(bronze)
Sambo Lapung	69 kg	68.68	119	150	269	4
Ragala Venkat Rahul	77 kg	76.95	142	168	310	(gold)

Women's

Athlete	Event	Body weight (kg)	Snatch (kg)	Clean & Jerk (kg)	Total (kg)	Rank
Sagolsem Thasana Chanu	58 kg	57.91	73	96	169	5
