= 2013 Asian Youth Games =

II Asian Youth Games
- Host city: Nanjing, China
- Motto: Celebrating Youth, Passionate Asia (Chinese: 青春盛会, 活力亚洲; pinyin: Qīngchūn shènghuì huólì yàzhōu; lit. 'Youth Games', 'Vibrant Asia')
- Nations: 45
- Athletes: 2404
- Events: 122 in 16 sports
- Opening: August 16
- Closing: August 24
- Opened by: Liu Yandong; Vice Premier of China
- Closed by: Timothy Fok; Vice President of the Olympic Council of Asia
- Torch lighter: Xu Anqi; Qiu Liyong
- Main venue: Nanjing Olympic Sports Center Gymnasium
- Website: nanjing2013.org (archived)

The 2013 Asian Youth Games or AYG 2013 (Chinese: 2013年亚洲青年运动会; pinyin: Èr Líng yī sān Nián Yàzhōu Qīngnián Yùndònghuì), officially the 2nd Asian Youth Games (Chinese: 第二届亚洲青年运动会; pinyin: Dìèr Jiè Yàzhōu Qīngnián Yùndònghuì) and commonly as Nanjing 2013 (Chinese: 南京2013; pinyin: Nánjīng Èr Líng yī sān), were held in Nanjing, China from August 16–24, 2013. Like the inaugural edition, the games acted as dress-rehearsal for the 2014 Summer Youth Olympics, which were also held in the same city.

== Venues ==
- Nanjing Olympic Sports Center - Aquatics, Athletics, Squash
- Nanjing Sport Institute - Badminton
- Nanjing International Expo Center - Fencing, Weightlifting
- Wutaishan Sports Center
  - Wutaishan Stadium - Football, 3x3 basketball
  - Wutaishan Gymnasium - Table tennis
- Qingliangshan Sports School - Football
- Jiangning Sports Center - Football, Handball
- Zhongshan International Golf Club - Golf
- Nanjing University of Technology - Handball
- Longjiang Gymnasium - Judo, Taekwondo
- Youth Olympic Sports Park Rugby Field - Rugby sevens
- Fangshan Shooting Hall - Shooting
- Tennis Academy of China - Tennis

== Mascot ==
Official mascot

The mascot for the 2013 Asian Youth Games was unveiled in Nanjing on 31 October 2012. The mascot is called Yuan Yuan, is based on the image of Eosimias sinensis, the earliest higher primate to date found in Jiangsu.

== Sports ==
Officially, there were a total of 112 events in 16 sports, 6 more than that of the previous edition held at Singapore.

- 3x3 basketball (2)
- Aquatics
  - Diving (4)
  - Swimming (30)
- Athletics (34)
- Badminton (3)
- Fencing (6)
- Football (1)
- Golf (2)
- Handball (2)
- Judo (6)
- Rugby sevens (2)
- Shooting (8)
- Squash (4)
- Table tennis (2)
- Taekwondo (4)
- Tennis (3)
- Weightlifting (9)

== Participating nations ==
The 2013 Asian Youth Games saw 2404 athletes from all 45 competed. According to the Games' official website, Indian athletes participated the Games under the Olympic flag because the Indian Olympic Association was suspended due to political interference in December 2012.

- Afghanistan (8)
- Bahrain (27)
- Bangladesh (19)
- Bhutan (10)
- Brunei (5)
- Cambodia (2)
- China (252)
- Hong Kong (102)
- Independent Olympic Athletes (89)
- Indonesia (103)
- Iran (79)
- Iraq (60)
- Japan (62)
- Jordan (25)
- Kazakhstan (122)
- Kuwait (100)
- Kyrgyzstan (14)
- Laos (9)
- Lebanon (14)
- Macau (30)
- Malaysia (69)
- Maldives (14)
- Mongolia (65)
- Myanmar (8)
- Nepal (11)
- North Korea (43)
- Oman (10)
- Pakistan (41)
- Palestine (16)
- Philippines (55)
- Qatar (66)
- Saudi Arabia (69)
- Singapore (84)
- South Korea (123)
- Sri Lanka (37)
- Syria (28)
- Chinese Taipei (124)
- Tajikistan (9)
- Thailand (173)
- Timor-Leste (17)
- Turkmenistan (16)
- United Arab Emirates (18)
- Uzbekistan (61)
- Vietnam (101)
- Yemen (14)

== Calendar ==
OC	Opening ceremony	●	Event competitions	1	Event finals	CC	Closing ceremony

August 2013	13th Tue	14th Wed	15th Thu	16th Fri	17th Sat	18th Sun	19th Mon	20th Tue	21st Wed	22nd Thu	23rd Fri	24th Sat	Gold medals
3x3 basketball					●	●	●		●	2			2
Athletics							4	10	8	12			34
Badminton					●	●	●	●	3				3
Diving					2	2							4
Fencing							2	2	2				6
Football	●		●		●		●		●		1		1
Golf						●	●	2					2
Handball	●	●	●		●	●	●	●	●		2		2
Judo					2	2	2						6
Rugby sevens					●	●	2						2
Shooting						2	2	2	2				8
Squash					●	●	2	●	●	●	2		4
Swimming							3	7	7	7	6		30
Table tennis					●	●	2						2
Taekwondo									2	2			4
Tennis					●	●	●	●	●	●	3		3
Weightlifting					3		3		3				9
Total gold medals					7	6	22	23	27	23	14		122
Ceremonies				OC								CC	
August 2013	13th Tue	14th Wed	15th Thu	16th Fri	17th Sat	18th Sun	19th Mon	20th Tue	21st Wed	22nd Thu	23rd Fri	24th Sat	Gold medals

== Medal table ==
* Host nation (China)

Rank	Nation	Gold	Silver	Bronze	Total
1	China*	46	23	24	93
2	South Korea	25	13	14	52
3	Japan	7	5	6	18
4	Thailand	6	15	16	37
5	Chinese Taipei	6	11	13	30
6	Singapore	5	12	6	23
7	Vietnam	5	4	2	11
8	Malaysia	4	6	7	17
9	North Korea	4	2	5	11
10	Independent Olympic Athletes	3	4	7	14
11	Hong Kong	2	5	13	20
12	Philippines	2	3	0	5
13	Kazakhstan	1	4	8	13
14	Uzbekistan	1	2	5	8
15	Indonesia	1	2	2	5
16	Qatar	1	2	0	3
17	Kuwait	1	0	0	1
17	Saudi Arabia	1	0	0	1
17	Syria	1	0	0	1
20	Iran	0	6	2	8
21	Sri Lanka	0	1	5	6
22	Iraq	0	1	1	2
22	Tajikistan	0	1	1	2
24	Jordan	0	0	3	3
24	Mongolia	0	0	3	3
26	Bahrain	0	0	1	1
26	Kyrgyzstan	0	0	1	1
26	Macau	0	0	1	1
26	Yemen	0	0	1	1
Totals (29 entries)		122	122	147	391
