= Japan at the 2013 Asian Youth Games =

- IOC code: JPN
- NOC: Japanese Olympic Committee
- Website: www.joc.or.jp

in Nanjing, China 16 - 24 August 2013
- Competitors: 62 (31 boys and 31 girls) in 8 sports
- Medals Ranked 3rd: Gold 7 Silver 5 Bronze 6 Total 18

Asian Youth Games appearances
- 2009; 2013; 2025

Japan participated in the 2013 Asian Youth Games in Nanjing, China on 16 August – 24 August 2013. The nation sent 62 athletes to the games. Japan finished third at the medal table with seven gold, five silver, and six bronze medals.

== Competitors ==
Sport	Men	Women	Total
Athletics	5	5	10
Badminton	1	1	2
Fencing	6	6	12
Rugby	10	10	20
Shooting	1	2	3
Squash	3	3	6
Table tennis	1	1	2
Weightlifting	4	3	7
Total	31	31	62

== Medalists ==
Medal	Name	Sport	Event	Date
Gold	Ayano Sakurai; Yuki Oyokawa; Wasana Fukushima; Yumeno Noda; Minori Yamamoto; Yuki Ito; Shiho Ugawa; Raichel Bativakalolo; Hibiki Niihara; Yukari Tateyama	Rugby	Girls' tournaments	August 19
Gold	Takumu Furuya	Athletics	Boys' 110 m hurdles	August 21
Gold	Nana Fujimori	Athletics	Girls' 100 m hurdles	August 21
Gold	Ayaka Mukae	Fencing	Girls' sabre	August 21
Gold	Minoru Koga; Akane Yamaguchi	Badminton	Mixed doubles	August 21
Gold	Fukiko Ando	Athletics	Girls' 3000 m	August 22
Gold	Yuji Hiramatsu	Athletics	Boys' high jump	August 22
Silver	Yume Ando	Athletics	Boys' shot put	August 19
Silver	Karin Miyawaki	Fencing	Girls' foil	August 19
Silver	Toshiya Saito	Fencing	Boys' foil	August 21
Silver	Yume Ando	Athletics	Boys' discus throw	August 22
Silver	Chikashi Ikeda	Athletics	Boys' 3000 m	August 22
Bronze	Reona Itami	Weightlifting	Boys' 62 m	August 17
Bronze	Tatsuhiro Nagai; Toshiki Kuwayama; Ryosuke Funahashi; Naoto Saito; Koki Takeyama; Shimin Kohara; Kento Nakai; Kohei Hanada; Kodai Sato; Eiya Miyazaki	Rugby	Boys' tournaments	August 19
Bronze	Akira Komata	Fencing	Boys' épée	August 20
Bronze	Kenichi Shioyama	Athletics	Boys' 200 m	August 22
Bronze	Yuna Otake	Athletics	Girls' 200 m	August 22
Bronze	Momoka Nakahira; Ayaka Shiraishi; Satomi Watanabe	Squash	Girls' team	August 22

Medals by sport
Sport	1st place, gold medalist(s)	2nd place, silver medalist(s)	3rd place, bronze medalist(s)	Total
Athletics	4	3	2	9
Fencing	1	2	1	4
Rugby	1	0	1	2
Badminton	1	0	0	1
Squash	0	0	1	1
Weightlifting	0	0	1	1
Total	7	5	6	18

Medals by gender
Gender	1st place, gold medalist(s)	2nd place, silver medalist(s)	3rd place, bronze medalist(s)	Total
Female	4	1	2	7
Male	2	4	4	10
Mixed	1	0	0	1
Total	7	5	6	18
