= Malaysia at the 2013 Asian Youth Games =

- IOC code: MAS
- NOC: Olympic Council of Malaysia
- Website: www.olympic.org.my (in English)

in Nanjing
- Competitors: 69 in 13 sports
- Flag bearer: Ng Eain Yow
- Medals Ranked 8th: Gold 4 Silver 6 Bronze 7 Total 17

Asian Youth Games appearances
- 2009; 2013; 2025

Malaysia competed in the 2013 Asian Youth Games held in Nanjing, China from 16 to 24 August 2013. Malaysia won a total of 17 medals, including 4 golds, 6 silvers and 7 bronzes. It earned eighth position in the medal table.

== Medallists ==
Medal	Name	Sport	Event	Date
Gold	Vanessa Raj	Squash	Girls' singles	19 Aug
Gold	Lim Ching Hwang	Swimming	Boys' 200 metre freestyle	20 Aug
Gold	Darren Chan; Mohd Syafiq Kamal; Ng Eain Yow	Squash	Boys' team	23 Aug
Gold	Celine Yeap; Rachel Arnold; Vanessa Raj	Squash	Girls' team	23 Aug
Silver	Loh Zhiayi	Diving	Girls' 10 metre platform	17 Aug
Silver	Mohd Syafiq Kamal	Squash	Boys' singles	19 Aug
Silver	Yap Siew Hui	Swimming	Girls' 50 metre butterfly	21 Aug
Silver	Savinder Kaur	Athletics	Girls' 800 metres	22 Aug
Silver	Lim Ching Hwang	Swimming	Boys' 50 metre freestyle	22 Aug
Silver	Lim Ching Hwang	Swimming	Boys' 100 metre freestyle	23 Aug
Bronze	Ng Eain Yow	Squash	Boys' singles	18 Aug
Bronze	Afiq Ahmad Alham	Athletics	Boys' pole vault	19 Aug
Bronze	Alwyn Tan Yean Yang; Lim Ching Hwang; Welson Sim Wee Sheng; Wong Fu Kang	Swimming	Boys' 4 × 100 metre freestyle relay	20 Aug
Bronze	Kisona Selvaduray	Badminton	Girls' singles	21 Aug
Bronze	Norshafiee Mohd Shah	Athletics	Boys' high jump	22 Aug
Bronze	Yap Siew Hui	Swimming	Girls' 100 metre butterfly	22 Aug
Bronze	Wong Fu Kang	Swimming	Boys' 200 metre breaststroke	23 Aug

== 3-on-3 basketball ==
=== Boys' tournament ===
Group D

Team	Pld	W	L	PF	PA	PD	Pts
China	3	3	0	56	18	+38	6
Malaysia	3	2	1	47	33	+14	5
Mongolia	3	1	2	23	50	−27	4
Jordan	3	0	3	23	48	−25	3

August 17
21:00

China	15–8	Malaysia
Pts: Xu M.Z. 6		Pts: Wong Y.H. 5

Wutaishan Basketball Venue, Nanjing
Referees: Leong Chuen Wing (SIN)

August 18
18:30

Mongolia	9–21	Malaysia
Pts: Tuguldur 4		Pts: Wong Y.H. 8

Wutaishan Basketball Venue, Nanjing
Referees: Ahmed Al-Suwaili (IRQ)

August 19
17:30

Malaysia	18–9	Jordan
Pts: Wong 9		Pts: Hijazi, Al-Abed 3

Wutaishan Basketball Venue, Nanjing
Referees: Leong Chuen Wing (SIN)

Quarterfinals

August 21
17:30

Chinese Taipei	21–19	Malaysia
Pts: Chen P.H. 9		Pts: Wong Y.H. 12

Wutaishan Basketball Venue, Nanjing
Referees: Dwi Cahyo Kartiko (INA)

Fifth to eighth place classification

August 21
20:00

Malaysia	21–18	Philippines
Pts: Wong Y.H. 8		Pts: Caracut 10

Wutaishan Basketball Venue, Nanjing
Referees: Watcharin Padungratchadakit (THA)

Fifth and sixth place classification

August 22
20:30

Malaysia	12–16	Thailand
Pts: Wong Y.H. 7		Pts: Menkul 8

Wutaishan Basketball Venue, Nanjing
Referees: Shi Jing (CHN)

Fifth in final standings

== Athletics ==
Boys
Track event

Athlete	Event	Heats			Final	
Athlete	Event	Result	Rank	Overall rank	Result	Rank
Mohd Rizzua Haizad Muhamad	110 m hurdles	14.42	1 Q	4	14.10	4

Field events

Athlete	Event	Qualification		Final	
Athlete	Event	Distance	Rank	Distance	Rank
Norshafiee Mohd Shah	High jump	—		2.00	3rd place, bronze medalist(s)
Afiq Ahmad Alham	Pole vault	—		4.50	3rd place, bronze medalist(s)

Girls
Track event

Athlete	Event	Heats			Final	
Athlete	Event	Result	Rank	Overall rank	Result	Rank
Savinder Kaur	800 m	2:18.40	1 Q	4	2:14.14	2nd place, silver medalist(s)

Field events

Athlete	Event	Qualification		Final	
Athlete	Event	Distance	Rank	Distance	Rank
Kirthana Ramasamy	Long jump	5.05	15	did not advance	
Kirthana Ramasamy	Triple jump	—		12.23	4
Chin Poh Kuan	Shot put	—		13.27	5
Chin Poh Kuan	Discus throw	—		35.82	4

== Diving ==
Boys

Athlete	Event	Preliminary		Final	
Athlete	Event	Score	Rank	Score	Rank
Mohd Danial Sabri	3 m springboard	487.15	4 Q	531.40	4
Mohd Nazreen Abdullah	10 m platform	437.55	5 Q	442.70	5

Girls

Athlete	Event	Preliminary		Final	
Athlete	Event	Score	Rank	Score	Rank
Loh Zhiayi	3 m springboard	408.60	3	434.80	4
Loh Zhiayi	10 m platform	406.25	2	411.90	2nd place, silver medalist(s)

== Golf ==
Boys

Athlete	Event	Round 1	Round 2	Round 3	Total Score	Par	Final rank
Athlete	Event	Score	Score	Score	Total Score	Par	Final rank
Albright Chong	Individual	70	77	77	224	+8	11
Solomon Emilio Rosidin	Individual	74	72	72	218	+2	7

Girls

Athlete	Event	Round 1	Round 2	Round 3	Total Score	Par	Final rank
Athlete	Event	Score	Score	Score	Total Score	Par	Final rank
Kelie Kan Kah Yan	Individual	74	80	77	231	+15	15
Nur Eliana Ariffin	Individual	75	76	72	223	+7	13

== Judo ==
Boys

Athlete	Event	Preliminary	1/8 final	Quarterfinal	Semifinal	Final	Rank
Athlete	Event	Opposition Score	Opposition Score	Opposition Score	Opposition Score	Opposition Score	Rank
Farhan Uzair Fikri	66 kg	Putu Bagus Pradnya (INA); W 100 – 000	Himprawa Khatri (NEP); W 100 – 000	Kim Chol-gwang (PRK); L 000 – 100	Repechage; Zeng Xianyan (CHN); L 010 – 101	Did not advance	

Girls

Athlete	Event	Preliminary	1/8 final	Quarterfinal	Semifinal	Final	Rank
Athlete	Event	Opposition Score	Opposition Score	Opposition Score	Opposition Score	Opposition Score	Rank
Fara Aida Sofia	52 kg	Kim Jin-a (PRK); L 000 – 100	Did not advance				

== Swimming ==
Boys

Athlete	Event	Heat		Semifinal		Final	
Athlete	Event	Time	Rank	Time	Rank	Time	Rank
Alwyn Tan Yean Yang	50 m freestyle	24.77	9 Q	24.53	8 Q	24.45	7
Lim Ching Hwang	50 m freestyle	24.12	2 Q	23.62	2 Q	23.46	2nd place, silver medalist(s)
Lim Ching Hwang	100 m freestyle	52.24	1 Q	52.24	2 Q	51.14	2nd place, silver medalist(s)
Welson Sim Wee Sheng	100 m freestyle	52.64	5 Q	53.60	10	did not advance	
Lim Ching Hwang	200 m freestyle	1:53.35	1 Q	—		1:50.81	1st place, gold medalist(s)
Welson Sim Wee Sheng	200 m freestyle	1:53.84	4 Q	—		1:53.61	6
Welson Sim Wee Sheng	100 m backstroke	1:00.79	10 Q	1:00.61	12	did not advance	
Wong Fu Kang	50 m breaststroke	29.89	4 Q	29.92	5 Q	29.78	4
Wong Fu Kang	100 m breaststroke	1:06.51	5 Q	1:06.22	6 Q	1:04.79	4
Wong Fu Kang	200 m breaststroke	2:24.17	3 Q	—		2:21.16	3rd place, bronze medalist(s)
Alwyn Tan Yean Yang	50 m butterfly	26.83	15 Q	26.38	14	did not advance	
Alwyn Tan Yean Yang	100 m butterfly	59.06	16 Q	57.68	11	did not advance	
Wong Fu Kang	100 m butterfly	59.06	17	did not advance			
Wong Fu Kang	200 m individual medley	2:19.59	17	—		did not advance	
Alwyn Tan Yean Yang; Lim Ching Hwang; Welson Sim Wee Sheng; Wong Fu Kang	4 × 100 m freestyle relay	3:35.18	3 Q	—		3:29.81	3rd place, bronze medalist(s)
Alwyn Tan Yean Yang; Lim Ching Hwang; Welson Sim Wee Sheng; Wong Fu Kang	4 × 100 m medley relay	3:59.22	5 Q	—		4:01.88	6

Girls

Athlete	Event	Heat		Semifinal		Final	
Athlete	Event	Time	Rank	Time	Rank	Time	Rank
Kok Cher Ling	50 m freestyle	27.49	5 Q	27.40	7 Q	27.52	8
Yap Siew Hui	50 m freestyle	28.52	17	did not advance			
Chris Tan Li Ling	100 m freestyle	1:00.44	12 Q	1:00.49	13	did not advance	
Kok Cher Ling	100 m freestyle	1:01.07	16 Q	1:01.89	16	did not advance	
Chris Tan Li Ling	200 m freestyle	2:12.05	12	—		did not advance	
Tan Rou Ying	200 m freestyle	2:15.90	19	—		did not advance	
Tan Rou Ying	50 m backstroke	32.00	15 Q	31.85	14	did not advance	
Yap Siew Hui	50 m backstroke	32.73	17	did not advance			
Chris Tan Li Ling	100 m backstroke	1:08.75	15 Q	1:08.05	14	did not advance	
Tan Rou Ying	100 m backstroke	1:09.84	16 Q	1:09.93	16	did not advance	
Chris Tan Li Ling	200 m backstroke	2:29.13	10	—		did not advance	
Tan Rou Ying	200 m backstroke	2:36.19	14	—		did not advance	
Nadia Adrianna Redza Goh	50 m breaststroke	34.42	8 Q	34.29	9	did not advance	
Phee Jinq En	50 m breaststroke	34.15	7 Q	33.72	6 Q	33.49	6
Nadia Adrianna Redza Goh	100 m breaststroke	1:13.97	5 Q	1:13.76	6 Q	1:14.05	7
Phee Jinq En	100 m breaststroke	1:15.64	8 Q	1:14.24	7 Q	1:12.85	5
Nadia Adrianna Redza Goh	200 m breaststroke	2:35.66	2 Q	—		2:37.96	6
Phee Jinq En	200 m breaststroke	2:47.74	10	—		did not advance	
Tan Rou Ying	50 m butterfly	30.30	18	did not advance			
Yap Siew Hui	50 m butterfly	28.69	5 Q	28.31	4 Q	27.96	2nd place, silver medalist(s)
Tan Rou Ying	100 m butterfly	1:06.38	13 Q	1:04.71	8 Q	1:04.87	8
Yap Siew Hui	100 m butterfly	1:04.13	4 Q	1:03.89	5 Q	1:02.15	3rd place, bronze medalist(s)
Angela Chieng Chui Fei	200 m butterfly	2:22.85	7 Q	—		2:22.79	7
Yap Siew Hui	200 m butterfly	2:25.72	9	—		did not advance	
Nadia Adrianna Redza Goh	200 m individual medley	2:24.38	7 Q	—		2:24.96	8
Chris Tan Li Ling; Kok Cher Ling; Nadia Adrianna Redza Goh; Yap Siew Hui	4 × 100 m freestyle relay	4:05.09	7 Q	—		4:03.86	7
	4 × 100 m medley relay	4:32.43	9	—		did not advance	

== Taekwondo ==
Boys

Athlete	Event	Quarterfinal	Semifinal	Final	Rank
Athlete	Event	Opposition Score	Opposition Score	Opposition Score	Rank
Navin Ari Krisnasamy	53 kg	Jin Agojo (PHI); L 4 – 11	Did not advance		

== Weightlifting ==
Boys

Athlete	Event	Snatch		Clean & Jerk		Total	Rank
Athlete	Event	Result	Rank	Result	Rank	Total	Rank
Darul Najmi Dollah	56 kg	86	7	110	7	196	7
Rony Jesos	56 kg	80	10	102	9	182	10
Mohd Yazid Hazirul	62 kg	90	15	115	13	205	14
Mohd Zaidi Nordin	62 kg	91	11	122	12	213	11
Afifi Haikal Nordin	77 kg	100	9	120	9	220	9
