= Iran at the 2013 Asian Youth Games =

- IOC code: IRI
- NOC: National Olympic Committee of the Islamic Republic of Iran

in Nanjing
- Competitors: 79 in 9 sports
- Flag bearer: Ali Nassiri
- Medals Ranked 20th: Gold 0 Silver 6 Bronze 2 Total 8

Asian Youth Games appearances
- 2009; 2013; 2025

Iran participated in the 2013 Asian Youth Games was held in Nanjing, China from 16 to 24 August 2013.

== Competitors ==
Sport	Boys	Girls	Total
3x3 basketball	4		4
Athletics	12	3	15
Diving	1		1
Football	18		18
Handball	14		14
Judo	3	3	6
Shooting	5	5	10
Swimming	5		5
Table tennis	2	2	4
Taekwondo	1	1	2
Total	65	14	79

== Medal summary ==
=== Medals by sport ===
Sport	Gold	Silver	Bronze	Total
Athletics		3	1	4
Football		1		1
Judo			1	1
Shooting		1		1
Taekwondo		1		1
Total	0	6	2	8

=== Medalists ===
Medal	Name	Sport	Event
Silver	Ata Asadi	Athletics	Boys' 1500 m
Silver	Javad Shouryabi	Athletics	Boys' 400 m hurdles
Silver	Arian Zarekani	Athletics	Boys' high jump
Silver	Mohammad Reza Sheikhhosseini; Mohammad Pourshaker; Mehdi Rahimi; Farid Nedaei; Mohammad Javad Afkhami; Amir Mehdi Janmaleki; Behrouz Jalalian; Meisam Nasseri; Mohammad Soltanimehr; Shahab Rashno; Ali Akbar Najafi; Mehdi Zaferani; Pedram Moradi; Omid Seidali; Hassan Zareei; Mohammad Garousi; Hossein Shajie; Milad Talaei	Football	Boys
Silver	Marzieh Parvareshnia	Shooting	Girls' trap
Silver	Abolfazl Yaghoubi	Taekwondo	Boys' 62 kg
Bronze	Ata Asadi	Athletics	Boys' 800 m
Bronze	Iman Nikeghbal	Judo	Boys' 81 kg

== Results by event ==
=== 3x3 basketball ===
Athlete	Event	Preliminary round					Quarterfinal	Semifinal	Final	Rank
Athlete	Event	Round 1	Round 2	Round 3	Round 4	Rank	Quarterfinal	Semifinal	Final	Rank
Mobin Sheikhi; Soheil Farhadi; Amin Toudeh; Ali Nassiri	Boys	South Korea; L 15–17	Iraq; W 21–10	Bangladesh; W 17–15	Macau; W 12–11	2 Q	Philippines; W 16–14	Chinese Taipei; L 11–13	3rd place match South Korea; L 16–18	4

=== Aquatics ===
==== Diving ====
Athlete	Event	Preliminary		Final	
Athlete	Event	Score	Rank	Score	Rank
Mohammad Hamed Bazmi	Boys' 3 m springboard	401.45	11 Q	421.35	9

==== Swimming ====
Athlete	Event	Heats		Semifinals		Final	
Athlete	Event	Time	Rank	Time	Rank	Time	Rank
Nima Abdollahi	Boys' 50 m freestyle	25.25	17	Did not advance			
Reza Beikmohammadi	Boys' 50 m freestyle	24.75	8 Q	24.89	15	Did not advance	
Nima Abdollahi	Boys' 100 m freestyle	58.78	28	Did not advance			
Reza Beikmohammadi	Boys' 100 m freestyle	56.32	21	Did not advance			
Mohsen Mehmannavaz	Boys' 50 m backstroke	28.31	10 Q	28.38	10	Did not advance	
Raham Peiravani	Boys' 50 m backstroke	28.30	9 Q	28.19	9	Did not advance	
Mohsen Mehmannavaz	Boys' 100 m backstroke	1:01.64	14 Q	1:01.42	16	Did not advance	
Raham Peiravani	Boys' 100 m backstroke	1:00.58	8 Q	59.79	8 Q	1:02.07	8
Mohsen Mehmannavaz	Boys' 200 m backstroke	2:25.25	18	—N/a		Did not advance	
Raham Peiravani	Boys' 200 m backstroke	2:09.04	1 Q	—N/a		2:18.12	8
Reza Beikmohammadi	Boys' 50 m butterfly	28.18	24	Did not advance			
Raham Peiravani	Boys' 50 m butterfly	26.58	13 Q	26.47	15	Did not advance	
Kamyab Karimi	Boys' 100 m butterfly	1:02.44	23	Did not advance			
Kamyab Karimi	Boys' 200 m butterfly	2:16.42	13	—N/a		Did not advance	
Mohsen Mehmannavaz	Boys' 200 m individual medley	2:27.10	20	—N/a		Did not advance	
Raham Peiravani	Boys' 200 m individual medley	2:17.96	15	—N/a		Did not advance	
Raham Peiravani; Nima Abdollahi; Mohsen Mehmannavaz; Reza Beikmohammadi	Boys' 4 × 100 m freestyle relay	3:49.45	13	—N/a		Did not advance	
Mohsen Mehmannavaz; Reza Beikmohammadi; Raham Peiravani; Nima Abdollahi	Boys' 4 × 100 m medley relay	4:27.14	12	—N/a		Did not advance	

=== Athletics ===
Track

Athlete	Event	Round 1		Semifinal		Final	Rank
Athlete	Event	Time	Rank	Time	Rank	Time	Rank
Ebrahim Ahmadzadeh	Boys' 200 m	DNS	—	Did not advance			—
Sadegh Mardani	Boys' 200 m	23.67	5	Did not advance			18
Ata Asadi	Boys' 800 m	2:05.03	3 Q	—N/a		1:56.73	3rd place, bronze medalist(s)
Iman Talebi	Boys' 800 m	1:58.65	2 Q	—N/a		1:56.95	4
Ata Asadi	Boys' 1500 m	—N/a				4:05.09	2nd place, silver medalist(s)
Iman Talebi	Boys' 1500 m	—N/a				4:24.68	10
Sajjad Hassanbeigi	Boys' 110 m hurdles	15.20	6	—N/a		Did not advance	15
Javad Shouryabi	Boys' 110 m hurdles	14.68	2 Q	—N/a		14.55	6
Javad Shouryabi	Boys' 400 m hurdles	55.01	1 Q	—N/a		53.89	2nd place, silver medalist(s)

Field

Athlete	Event	Qualification		Final	
Athlete	Event	Result	Rank	Result	Rank
Arian Zarekani	Boys' high jump	—N/a		2.03	2nd place, silver medalist(s)
Meisam Abdollahpour	Boys' long jump	6.47	11 q	6.48	9
Sadegh Mardani	Boys' long jump	6.52	9 Q	6.62	6
Mehdi Rostami	Boys' shot put	—N/a		15.68	5
Amin Esmaeilizadeh	Boys' discus throw	—N/a		45.37	5
Mohammad Reza Tayyebi	Boys' discus throw	—N/a		45.83	4
Mohammad Esfandiari	Boys' javelin throw	—N/a		56.10	6
Zahra Ayoubifard	Girls' long jump	4.65	19	Did not advance	
Fatemeh Izadi	Girls' shot put	—N/a		10.93	12
Fatemeh Taghavi	Girls' shot put	—N/a		9.13	14

=== Football ===
Team	Event	Preliminary round				Quarterfinal	Semifinal	Final	Rank
Team	Event	Round 1	Round 2	Round 3	Rank	Quarterfinal	Semifinal	Final	Rank
Iran	Boys	Indonesia; W 4–0	Hong Kong; W 5–0	Saudi Arabia; W 5–0	1 Q	Vietnam; W 2–1	Iraq; W 1–0	South Korea; L 0–1	2nd place, silver medalist(s)
Roster: Mohammad Reza Sheikhhosseini; Mohammad Pourshaker; Mehdi Rahimi; Farid Nedaei; Mohammad Javad Afkhami; Amir Mehdi Janmaleki; Behrouz Jalalian; Meisam Nasseri; Mohammad Soltanimehr; Shahab Rashno; Ali Akbar Najafi; Mehdi Zaferani; Pedram Moradi; Omid Seidali; Hassan Zareei; Mohammad Garousi; Hossein Shajie; Milad Talaei; Coach: Ali Tahmasebizadeh

=== Handball ===
Team	Event	Preliminary round				Second round				Semifinal	Final	Rank
Team	Event	Round 1	Round 2	Round 3	Rank	Round 1	Round 2	Round 3	Rank	Semifinal	Final	Rank
Iran	Boys	Pakistan; W 55–12	Vietnam; W 43–6	Qatar; L 21–23	2 Q	South Korea; L 24–29	Saudi Arabia; L 22–27	Kuwait; L 24–27	4	Did not advance	7th place match Syria; W 42–26	7
Roster: Arash Norouzinejad; Milad Sahraei; Hamid Reza Tajik; Abolfazl Afzalnia; Mohammad Javad Faghihinia; Amir Hossein Hashemi; Mohammad Hassan Yazdani; Mostafa Seifi; Amir Sahraei; Rasoul Ghandi; Mohammad Amin Farhadi; Hamed Bahrehdar; Mehdi Hamidieh; Amin Yousefinejad; Coach: Gholam Ali Akbarabadi

=== Judo ===
Athlete	Event	Round of 32	Round of 16	Quarterfinal	Semifinal	Final	Rank
Mohammad Reza Sedighi	Boys' 55 kg	Lee (KOR); L 000–010	Did not advance				17
Mehdi Fathipour	Boys' 66 kg	Bye	Tsai (TPE); L 010–021	Did not advance			9
Iman Nikeghbal	Boys' 81 kg	Aliýew (TKM); W 000–000	Hajjar (LIB); W 100–000	Bolat (KAZ); W 100–000	Mirzayorov (UZB); L 000–011	3rd place match Lain (MYA); W 100–000	3rd place, bronze medalist(s)
Fatemeh Shabani	Girls' 44 kg	—N/a	Lin (TPE); L 000–100	Did not advance			9
Mobina Azizi	Girls' 52 kg	Shawkara (YEM); W 100–000	Talantbek Kyzy (KGZ); L 000–110	Did not advance			9
Mohaddeseh Khishvand	Girls' 63 kg	Bye	Windawati (INA); L 000–020	Did not advance			9

=== Shooting ===
Athlete	Event	Qualification		Semifinal		Final	
Athlete	Event	Score	Rank	Score	Rank	Score	Rank
Morteza Alimohammadi	Boys' 10 m air pistol	560	12	—N/a		Did not advance	
Kourosh Mohammadyari	Boys' 10 m air pistol	546	22	—N/a		Did not advance	
Mahyar Sedaghat	Boys' 10 m air rifle	616.5	3 Q	—N/a		121.3	6
Hamoun Yousefi	Boys' 10 m air rifle	610.7	13	—N/a		Did not advance	
Behzad Iranmanesh	Boys' trap	103, +1 SO	6 Q	10	5	Did not advance	
Hanieh Rostamian	Girls' 10 m air pistol	361	17	—N/a		Did not advance	
Manijeh Zare	Girls' 10 m air pistol	365	14	—N/a		Did not advance	
Fatemeh Karamzadeh	Girls' 10 m air rifle	409.1	6 Q	—N/a		79.4	8
Najmeh Khedmati	Girls' 10 m air rifle	411.2	4 Q	—N/a		101.4	7
Marzieh Parvareshnia	Girls' trap	57	4 Q	10	1 Q	Deng (CHN); L 10–10, 0–1 SO	2nd place, silver medalist(s)

=== Table tennis ===
Athlete	Event	Preliminary round				Playoffs	Round of 16	Quarterfinal	Semifinal	Final	Rank
Athlete	Event	Round 1	Round 2	Round 3	Rank	Playoffs	Round of 16	Quarterfinal	Semifinal	Final	Rank
Soroush Amirinia	Boys' singles	Zahir (MDV); W 3–0 (10, 2, 3)	Khatib (PLE); W 3–0 (6, 5, 8)	Yin (SIN); W 3–2 (8, −5, −5, 5, 11)	1 Q	Bye	Yadav (AOI); L 2–4 (6, 4, −7, −8, −9, −8)	Did not advance			9
Matin Lotfollahnasabi	Boys' singles	Lim (SIN); W 3–2 (−12, 8, 10, −7, 10)	Gerassimenko (KAZ); W 3–2 (9, −4, −7, 4, 10)	Leong (MAS); L 1–3 (−9, −13, 9, −6)	2 Q	Ri (PRK); L 2–3 (5, 4, −9, −9, −10)	Did not advance				21
Zahra Alavi	Girls' singles	Ryabova (KAZ); L 0–3 (−4, −14, −8)	Chiu (TPE); L 0–3 (−3, −1, −3)	—N/a	3	Did not advance					25
Fatemeh Jamalifar	Girls' singles	Lim (MAS); L 1–3 (9, −5, −7, −6)	Lam (HKG); L 0–3 (−3, −6, −3)	—N/a	3	Did not advance					25

=== Taekwondo ===
Athlete	Event	Quarterfinal	Semifinal	Final	Rank
Abolfazl Yaghoubi	Boys' 62 kg	Abou Halka (LIB); W 25–2	Al-Orani (JOR); W 9–2	Cho (KOR); L 4–5	2nd place, silver medalist(s)
Kimia Jahani	Girls' 47 kg	Wongpattanakit (THA); L 5–14	Did not advance		5
