= Football at the 2013 Asian Youth Games =

- Venue: Jiangning Training Base; Qingliangshan Sports School; Jiangning Sports Center; Wutaishan Stadium
- Dates: 13–23 August 2013

Football at the 2013 Asian Youth Games was held from 13 August 2013 to 23 August 2013. Age limit for the teams was under-14. South Korea beat Iran 1–0 by a second half penalty to defend the 2009 gold medal, North Korea beat Iraq on penalties to win the bronze medal.

== Medalists ==
Event	Gold	Silver	Bronze
Boys	South Korea; Goh Dong-min; Lee Chang-hyeon; Lee Jae-ik; Hwang Tae-hyeon; Kim Seong-hun; Bae Jin-su; Kim Dong-gyun; Kim Jung-min; Cho Young-wook; Im Wha-rang; Lee Ji-yong; Lee Seung; Chae Hui-chang; Lee Sang-su; Lee Ji-sol; Jeong Woo-yeong; Sim Won-seong; Lee Chang-min	Iran; Mohammad Reza Sheikhhosseini; Mohammad Pourshaker; Mehdi Rahimi; Farid Nedaei; Mohammad Javad Afkhami; Amir Mehdi Janmaleki; Behrouz Jalalian; Meisam Nasseri; Mohammad Soltanimehr; Shahab Rashno; Ali Akbar Najafi; Mehdi Zaferani; Pedram Moradi; Omid Seidali; Hassan Zareei; Mohammad Garousi; Hossein Shajie; Milad Talaei	North Korea; Ryu Hyok; Kim Pom-hyok; Kim Ho-gyong; Han Kwang-jin; Kim Kwon; Paek Chung-song; Kim Ok-chol; Ha Kyo-sok; Kim Ji-song; Jo Chol-bong; Jong Se-myong; Choe Kwon-hyok; Pak Kwang-chon; Kim Ji-guk; Jon Yong-song; Ryom Ji-hyok; Ri Sol-song; Kim Hyok

== Results ==
=== Preliminary round ===
==== Group A ====
Pos	Team	Pld	W	D	L	GF	GA	GD	Pts
1	Thailand	3	3	0	0	10	5	+5	9
2	Timor-Leste	3	2	0	1	6	3	+3	6
3	China	3	1	0	2	6	6	0	3
4	Qatar	3	0	0	3	2	10	−8	0

Source: Official website
13 August
18:00

Thailand	3–2	Timor-Leste
Tungcharoennuruk 15'; Somchob 32'; Saima-in 35+1'		A. Soares 20'; Trindade 50'

Jiangning Sports Center, Nanjing
Referee: Hla Min (Myanmar)

13 August
20:30

China	4–1	Qatar
Liu Ruofan 5', 48', 60'; Liu Changqi 13'		Al-Obaidli 16'

Jiangning Sports Center, Nanjing
Referee: Ahmad A'Qashah (Singapore)

15 August
18:00

Timor-Leste	1–0	China
Sarmento 8'

Jiangning Sports Center, Nanjing
Referee: Mooud Bonyadifard (Iran)

15 August
20:30

Qatar	1–3	Thailand
Al-Obaidli 44' (pen.)		Supanya 2'; Somchob 17'; Raetsomsri 57'

Jiangning Sports Center, Nanjing
Referee: Kim Song-ho (North Korea)

17 August
20:00

China	2–4	Thailand
Liu Ruofan 19', 54'		Noomchansakul 8' (pen.); Sansanit 11'; Saima-in 24'; Sangkaew 58'

Jiangning Sports Center, Nanjing
Referee: Wathik Mohammed (Iraq)

17 August
20:30

Timor-Leste	3–0	Qatar
Sarmento 3', 50', 69'

Wutaishan Stadium, Nanjing
Referee: Thong Chanketya (Cambodia)

==== Group B ====
Pos	Team	Pld	W	D	L	GF	GA	GD	Pts
1	South Korea	3	3	0	0	10	1	+9	9
2	Iraq	3	2	0	1	4	3	+1	6
3	Kuwait	3	1	0	2	3	6	−3	3
4	Singapore	3	0	0	3	1	8	−7	0

Source: Official website
13 August
15:00

Singapore	1–2	Iraq
Fandi 6'		M. Ali 31', 43'

Jiangning Training Base, Nanjing
Referee: Ma Ning (China)

13 August
17:30

South Korea	4–1	Kuwait
Kim Jung-min 15' (pen.); Kim Dong-gyun 24'; Jeong Woo-yeong 48'; Cho Young-wook 53'		Y. Al-Rashidi 38'

Jiangning Training Base, Nanjing
Referee: Mooud Bonyadifard (Iran)

15 August
15:00

Iraq	0–2	South Korea
		Jeong Woo-yeong 8', 17'

Jiangning Training Base, Nanjing
Referee: Agus Fauzan Arifin (Indonesia)

15 August
17:30

Kuwait	2–0	Singapore
Y. Al-Rashidi 48', 53'

Jiangning Training Base, Nanjing
Referee: Khurram Shahzad (Pakistan)

17 August
18:00

South Korea	4–0	Singapore
Cho Young-wook 13'; Kim Dong-gyun 48', 58'; Im Wha-rang 70'

Wutaishan Stadium, Nanjing
Referee: Ma Ning (China)

17 August
18:00

Iraq	2–0	Kuwait
Ridha 46'; M. Ali 70+1'

Jiangning Sports Center, Nanjing
Referee: Wang Di (China)

==== Group C ====
Pos	Team	Pld	W	D	L	GF	GA	GD	Pts
1	Iran	3	3	0	0	14	0	+14	9
2	Indonesia	3	2	0	1	3	5	−2	6
3	Saudi Arabia	3	0	1	2	2	8	−6	1
4	Hong Kong	3	0	1	2	1	7	−6	1

Source: Official website
13 August
18:00

Saudi Arabia	1–1	Hong Kong
Al-Muwallad 13'		Liu Chi Him 20'

Wutaishan Stadium, Nanjing
Referee: Kim Hee-gon (South Korea)

13 August
20:30

Iran	4–0	Indonesia
Najafi 26'; Soltanimehr 29', 63'; Rashno 61' (pen.)

Wutaishan Stadium, Nanjing
Referee: Wang Di (China)

15 August
18:00

Hong Kong	0–5	Iran
		Rashno 11', 31', 54' (pen.); Soltanimehr 26'; Najafi 69'

Wutaishan Stadium, Nanjing
Referee: Abdulrahman Al-Jassim (Qatar)

15 August
20:30

Indonesia	2–1	Saudi Arabia
Auriel 31'; Wibisono 54'		Al-Shahrani 65'

Wutaishan Stadium, Nanjing
Referee: Kao Jung-fang (Chinese Taipei)

17 August
15:00

Iran	5–0	Saudi Arabia
Nasseri 30'; Rahimi 40'; Shajie 45'; Garousi 59'; Najafi 61'

Jiangning Training Base, Nanjing
Referee: Kim Hee-gon (South Korea)

17 August
15:00

Hong Kong	0–1	Indonesia
		Wibisono 53'

Qingliangshan Sports School, Nanjing
Referee: Khurram Shahzad (Pakistan)

==== Group D ====
Pos	Team	Pld	W	D	L	GF	GA	GD	Pts
1	North Korea	3	3	0	0	11	1	+10	9
2	Vietnam	3	2	0	1	6	6	0	6
3	Pakistan	3	1	0	2	3	5	−2	3
4	Chinese Taipei	3	0	0	3	1	9	−8	0

Source: Official website
13 August
15:00

Chinese Taipei	1–3	Pakistan
Yu Pei-yu 18'		J. Ahmed 10', 28'; Shahid 35'

Qingliangshan Sports School, Nanjing
Referee: Thong Chanketya (Cambodia)

13 August
17:30

North Korea	6–1	Vietnam
Jon Yong-song 5', 63'; Kim Ji-song 18' (pen.), 27' (pen.); Ri Sol-song 20'; Kim Ho-gyong 35'		Đặng Văn Lâm 60' (pen.)

Qingliangshan Sports School, Nanjing
Referee: Abdulrahman Al-Jassim (Qatar)

15 August
15:00

Pakistan	0–2	North Korea
		Ri Sol-song 16'; Kim Ji-song 19'

Qingliangshan Sports School, Nanjing
Referee: Shi Zhenlu (China)

15 August
17:30

Vietnam	3–0	Chinese Taipei
Lê Văn Nam 21', 41'; Đặng Văn Lâm 69'

Qingliangshan Sports School, Nanjing
Referee: Wathik Mohammed (Iraq)

17 August
17:30

North Korea	3–0	Chinese Taipei
Ri Sol-song 13', 30', 32'

Jiangning Training Base, Nanjing
Referee: Ahmad A'Qashah (Singapore)

17 August
17:30

Vietnam	2–0	Pakistan
Lê Văn Nam 63', 71'

Qingliangshan Sports School, Nanjing
Referee: Abdulrahman Al-Jassim (Qatar)

=== Knockout round ===
Quarterfinals
19 August
Thailand	0
Iraq	3
19 August
Iran	2
Vietnam	1
19 August
South Korea	4
Timor-Leste	0
19 August
North Korea	3
Indonesia	2

Semifinals
21 August
Iraq	0
Iran	1
21 August
South Korea	1
North Korea	0

Gold medal match
23 August
Iran	0
South Korea	1
Bronze medal match
23 August
Iraq	1 (4)
North Korea (p)	1 (5)

==== Quarterfinals ====
19 August
17:30

South Korea	4–0	Timor-Leste
Im Wha-rang 41'; Kim Jung-min 49'; Kim Dong-gyun 63'; Cho Young-wook 74' (pen.)

Jiangning Sports Center, Nanjing
Referee: Shi Zhenlu (China)

19 August
17:30

North Korea	3–2	Indonesia
Ri Sol-song 27'; Jon Yong-song 31'; Kim Ji-song 48' (pen.)		Wibisono 61'; Riki 67'

Wutaishan Stadium, Nanjing
Referee: Mooud Bonyadifard (Iran)

19 August
20:30

Thailand	0–3	Iraq
		M. Ali 49', 67'; Kadhim 56'

Jiangning Sports Center, Nanjing
Referee: Kim Hee-gon (South Korea)

19 August
20:30

Iran	2–1	Vietnam
Soltanimehr 21'; Rashno 52'		Lê Văn Nam 60'

Wutaishan Stadium, Nanjing
Referee: Ahmad A'Qashah (Singapore)

==== Semifinals ====
21 August
17:30

Iraq	0–1	Iran
		Rashno 24' (pen.)

Wutaishan Stadium, Nanjing
Referee: Wang Di (China)

21 August
20:30

South Korea	1–0	North Korea
Kim Dong-gyun 50'

Wutaishan Stadium, Nanjing
Referee: Abdulrahman Al-Jassim (Qatar)

==== Bronze medal match ====
23 August
17:30

Iraq	1–1	North Korea
M. Ali 46'		Jon Yong-song 49'
Penalties
Al-Jawad (penalty scored); Ridha (penalty missed); Khalid (penalty scored); Kadhim (penalty scored); M. Ali (penalty scored)	4–5	(penalty scored) Kim Ho-gyong; (penalty scored) Ri Sol-song; (penalty scored) Jon Yong-song; (penalty scored) Paek Chung-song; (penalty scored) Kim Ji-song

Jiangning Sports Center, Nanjing
Referee: Ahmad A'Qashah (Singapore)

==== Gold medal match ====
23 August
20:30

Iran	0–1	South Korea
		Kim Jung-min 47' (pen.)

Jiangning Sports Center, Nanjing
Referee: Shi Zhenlu (China)

== Goalscorers ==
6 goals

- Shahab Rashno (IRI)
- Mohanad Ali (IRQ)
- Ri Sol-song (PRK)

5 goals

- Liu Ruofan (CHN)
- Kim Dong-gyun (KOR)
- Lê Văn Nam (VIE)

4 goals

- Mohammad Soltanimehr (IRI)
- Jon Yong-song (PRK)
- Kim Ji-song (PRK)
- Nelson Sarmento (TLS)

3 goals

- Rizky Aprilia Wibisono (INA)
- Ali Akbar Najafi (IRI)
- Cho Young-wook (KOR)
- Jeong Woo-yeong (KOR)
- Kim Jung-min (KOR)
- Yousef Al-Rashidi (KUW)

2 goals

- Im Wha-rang (KOR)
- Junaid Ahmed (PAK)
- Khalid Al-Obaidi (QAT)
- Chokanan Saima-in (THA)
- Danusom Somchob (THA)
- Đặng Văn Lâm (VIE)

1 goal

- Liu Changqi (CHN)
- Liu Chi Him (HKG)
- Dave Auriel (INA)
- Riki (INA)
- Mohammad Garousi (IRI)
- Meisam Nasseri (IRI)
- Mehdi Rahimi (IRI)
- Hossein Shajie (IRI)
- Ali Kadhim (IRQ)
- Mohammed Ridha (IRQ)
- Essam Al-Muwallad (KSA)
- Abdulaziz Al-Shahrani (KSA)
- Muhammad Shahid (PAK)
- Kim Ho-gyong (PRK)
- Ikhsan Fandi (SIN)
- Narakorn Noomchansakul (THA)
- Thanapon Raetsomsri (THA)
- Thanik Sangkaew (THA)
- Kittipong Sansanit (THA)
- Kittiphong Supanya (THA)
- Sirimongkol Tungcharoennuruk (THA)
- Armindo Vieira Soares (TLS)
- José Joaquim Trindade (TLS)
- Yu Pei-yu (TPE)
