= Table tennis at the 2013 Asian Youth Games =

- Venue: Wutaishan Gymnasium
- Dates: 17–19 August 2013

Table tennis at the 2013 Asian Youth Games was held in Wutaishan Gymnasium, Nanjing, China between 17 and 19 August 2013.

== Medalists ==
Event	Gold	Silver	Bronze
Boys' singles	Fan Zhendong; China	Liang Jingkun; China	Abhishek Yadav; Independent Olympic Athletes
Boys' singles	Fan Zhendong; China	Liang Jingkun; China	Lam Siu Hang; Hong Kong
Girls' singles	Liu Gaoyang; China	Zhu Chaohui; China	Lam Yee Lok; Hong Kong
Girls' singles	Liu Gaoyang; China	Zhu Chaohui; China	Doo Hoi Kem; Hong Kong

== Medal table ==
Rank	Nation	Gold	Silver	Bronze	Total
1	China (CHN)	2	2	0	4
2	Hong Kong (HKG)	0	0	3	3
3	Independent Olympic Athletes (AOI)	0	0	1	1
Totals (3 entries)		2	2	4	8

== Results ==
=== Boys' singles ===
==== First stage ====
17–18 August

Group A
Pos	Athlete	Pld	W	L	Pts	CHN	MGL	MDV
1	Fan Zhendong (CHN)	2	2	0	2	—	3–0	3–0
2	Otgontögsiin Khüslen (MGL)	2	1	1	1	4, 6, 2	—	3–0
3	Mohamed Zeesth Naseem (MDV)	2	0	2	0	6, 4, 7	10, 9, 10	—

Group B
Pos	Athlete	Pld	W	L	Pts	CHN	SRI	MGL
1	Liang Jingkun (CHN)	2	2	0	2	—	3–0	3–0
2	Thilini Vimukthi (SRI)	2	1	1	1	7, 4, 7	—	3–0
3	Pürevnyamyn Bilegjargal (MGL)	2	0	2	0	4, 4, 5	6, 7, 10	—

Group C
Pos	Athlete	Pld	W	L	Pts	KOR	KAZ	MAC
1	Kim Min-hyeok (KOR)	2	2	0	2	—	3–1	3–0
2	Erik Reiter (KAZ)	2	1	1	1	−8, 4, 3, 3	—	3–0
3	Leong Ka Kin (MAC)	2	0	2	0	2, 1, 3	8, 5, 7	—

Group D
Pos	Athlete	Pld	W	L	Pts	JPN	BRN	UAE	MAC
1	Tonin Ryuzaki (JPN)	3	3	0	3	—	3–0	3–0	3–0
2	Alyas Alyassi (BRN)	3	2	1	2	7, 7, 3	—	3–2	3–0
3	Abdulla Al-Mohaiseni (UAE)	3	1	2	1	3, 5, 6	−9, 11, 8, −6, 6	—	3–1
4	Wang Chun (MAC)	3	0	3	0	4, 6, 1	9, 9, 10	8, −7, 7, 6	—

Group E
Pos	Athlete	Pld	W	L	Pts	TPE	SRI	VIE	BHU
1	Huang Chien-tu (TPE)	3	3	0	3	—	3–0	3–0	3–0
2	Imesh Ranasinghe (SRI)	3	2	1	2	5, 9, 1	—	3–2	3–0
3	Tạ Hồng Khánh (VIE)	3	1	2	1	5, 2, 13	7, 7, −7, −8, 7	—	3–0
4	Bishal Gurung (BHU)	3	0	3	0	3, 4, 1	4, 11, 3	5, 7, 4	—

Group F
Pos	Athlete	Pld	W	L	Pts	THA	HKG	INA	PHI
1	Sirawit Puangthip (THA)	3	3	0	3	—	3–0	3–0	3–2
2	Li Hon Ming (HKG)	3	2	1	2	10, 4, 9	—	3–0	3–0
3	Ardha Yuana (INA)	3	1	2	1	12, 9, 9	5, 6, 6	—	3–1
4	Vince Oliva (PHI)	3	0	3	0	7, −10, −8, 4, 7	3, 8, 6	−6, 8, 12, 4	—

Group G
Pos	Athlete	Pld	W	L	Pts	HKG	PRK	INA	UZB
1	Lam Siu Hang (HKG)	3	3	0	3	—	3–2	3–0	3–0
2	Ri Kwang-myong (PRK)	3	2	1	2	8, −7, 10, −9, 7	—	3–1	3–0
3	Bima Abdi Negara (INA)	3	1	2	1	2, 2, 3	9, 5, −9, 5	—	3–1
4	Gennadiy Levchenko (UZB)	3	0	3	0	2, 7, 4	8, 9, 3	12, 8, −8, 10	—

Group H
Pos	Athlete	Pld	W	L	Pts	TPE	KSA	LIB	UAE
1	Sun Chia-hung (TPE)	3	3	0	3	—	3–2	3–0	3–0
2	Ali Al-Khadrawi (KSA)	3	2	1	2	7, 6, −7, −4, 8	—	3–1	3–0
3	Mohamad Hamie (LIB)	3	1	2	1	5, 4, 4	−10, 4, 14, 11	—	3–1
4	Saeed Saleh (UAE)	3	0	3	0	3, 1, 5	5, 3, 4	5, −8, 8, 3	—

Group I
Pos	Athlete	Pld	W	L	Pts	MAS	IRI	KAZ	SIN
1	Leong Chee Feng (MAS)	3	3	0	3	—	3–1	3–2	3–0
2	Matin Lotfollahnasabi (IRI)	3	2	1	2	9, 13, −9, 6	—	3–2	3–2
3	Kirill Gerassimenko (KAZ)	3	1	2	1	11, −9, 8, −6, 9	9, −4, −7, 4, 10	—	3–1
4	Edric Lim (SIN)	3	0	3	0	11, 5, 7	−12, 8, 10, −7, 10	9, 10, −8, 5	—

Group J
Pos	Athlete	Pld	W	L	Pts	IRI	SIN	PLE	MDV
1	Soroush Amirinia (IRI)	3	3	0	3	—	3–2	3–0	3–0
2	Yin Jing Yuan (SIN)	3	2	1	2	8, −5, −5, 5, 11	—	3–0	3–0
3	Omar Khatib (PLE)	3	1	2	1	6, 5, 8	5, 1, 2	—	3–0
4	Maizaru Adam Zahir (MDV)	3	0	3	0	10, 2, 3	2, 2, 9	9, 5, 7	—

Group K
Pos	Athlete	Pld	W	L	Pts	AOI	THA	PHI	NEP
1	Abhishek Yadav (AOI)	3	3	0	3	—	3–0	3–0	3–1
2	Supanut Wisutmaythangkoon (THA)	3	2	1	2	8, 3, 8	—	3–2	3–0
3	Ryan Rodney Jacolo (PHI)	3	1	2	1	9, 8, 13	−5, 6, −7, 7, 11	—	3–2
4	Mani Kumar Lama (NEP)	3	0	3	0	4, 4, −9, 7	9, 5, 7	−10, 9, −8, 8, 9	—

Group L
Pos	Athlete	Pld	W	L	Pts	KOR	MAS	BRN	LAO
1	Park Gang-hyeon (KOR)	3	3	0	3	—	3–0	3–1	3–0
2	Dunley Foo (MAS)	3	2	1	2	10, 9, 5	—	3–2	3–1
3	Rashed Khaled Sanad (BRN)	3	1	2	1	−6, 2, 7, 1	6, −8, −6, 8, 8	—	3–0
4	Phinith Kongphet (LAO)	3	0	3	0	8, 3, 9	8, −8, 6, 7	1, 7, 9	—

Source: Official website

==== Knockout stage ====
Playoffs 1 – 18 August
Ri Kwang-myong (PRK)	3–2 (5–11, 4–11, 11–9, 11–9, 12–10)	Matin Lotfollahnasabi (IRI)
Imesh Ranasinghe (SRI)	WO	Otgontögsiin Khüslen (MGL)
Thilini Vimukthi (SRI)	1–3 (8–11, 6–11, 11–8, 3–11)	Ali Al-Khadrawi (KSA)
Alyas Alyassi (BRN)	3–0 (11–2, 11–9, 11–4)	Erik Reiter (KAZ)

Playoffs 2 – 18 August
Alyas Alyassi (BRN)	2–3 (11–4, 7–11, 6–11, 11–6, 5–11)	Yin Jing Yuan (SIN)
Dunley Foo (MAS)	3–1 (11–3, 11–8, 7–11, 11–7)	Ali Al-Khadrawi (KSA)
Imesh Ranasinghe (SRI)	0–3 (8–11, 7–11, 7–11)	Supanut Wisutmaythangkoon (THA)
Li Hon Ming (HKG)	2–3 (8–11, 11–8, 11–9, 12–14, 7–11)	Ri Kwang-myong (PRK)

Round of 1/8; 18 August
Fan Zhendong (CHN)	11	11	11	11
Supanut Wisutmaythangkoon (THA)	4	3	6	6
Park Gang-hyeon (KOR)	11	7	13	9	10
Sun Chia-hung (TPE)	13	11	11	11	12
Abhishek Yadav (AOI)	6	4	11	11	11	11
Soroush Amirinia (IRI)	11	11	7	8	9	8
Dunley Foo (MAS)	11	4	11	11	2	3	11
Tonin Ryuzaki (JPN)	8	11	9	9	11	11	7
Kim Min-hyeok (KOR)	11	11	11	8	11
Yin Jing Yuan (SIN)	7	6	9	11	6
Leong Chee Feng (MAS)	9	4	8	2
Lam Siu Hang (HKG)	11	11	11	11
Huang Chien-tu (TPE)	11	11	11	11
Sirawit Puangthip (THA)	3	8	4	8
Ri Kwang-myong (PRK)	7	8	5	10
Liang Jingkun (CHN)	11	11	11	12

Quarterfinals; 19 August
Fan Zhendong (CHN)	11	11	11	11
Sun Chia-hung (TPE)	4	7	7	3
Abhishek Yadav (AOI)	11	11	15	5	18
Dunley Foo (MAS)	6	5	13	11	16
Kim Min-hyeok (KOR)	8	7	6	11	11	11	8
Lam Siu Hang (HKG)	11	11	11	8	8	13	11
Huang Chien-tu (TPE)	7	9	2	11	8
Liang Jingkun (CHN)	11	11	11	6	11

Semifinals; 19 August
Fan Zhendong (CHN)	11	11	11	11	11	11
Abhishek Yadav (AOI)	4	13	13	4	8	5
Lam Siu Hang (HKG)	6	11	9	11	4
Liang Jingkun (CHN)	11	9	11	13	11

Final; 19 August
Fan Zhendong (CHN)	11	5	11	11	11
Liang Jingkun (CHN)	8	11	9	3	3

=== Girls' singles ===
==== First stage ====
17–18 August

Group A
Pos	Athlete	Pld	W	L	Pts	CHN	SYR	PHI
1	Liu Gaoyang (CHN)	2	2	0	2	—	3–0	3–0
2	Souzan Mohammad (SYR)	2	1	1	1	2, 2, 1	—	3–1
3	Jamaica Sy (PHI)	2	0	2	0	2, 2, 1	5, 9, −6, 3	—

Group B
Pos	Athlete	Pld	W	L	Pts	HKG	KAZ	MGL
1	Doo Hoi Kem (HKG)	2	2	0	2	—	3–0	3–0
2	Gaukhar Almagambetova (KAZ)	2	1	1	1	3, 3, 5	—	3–1
3	Batbayaryn Doljinzuu (MGL)	2	0	2	0	6, 6, 6	−9, 13, 14, 9	—

Group C
Pos	Athlete	Pld	W	L	Pts	CHN	MAC	KUW
1	Zhu Chaohui (CHN)	2	2	0	2	—	3–0	3–0
2	Vu Lok In (MAC)	2	1	1	1	3, 4, 7	—	3–1
3	Noor Salem (KUW)	2	0	2	0	4, 1, 2	8, −7, 3, 6	—

Group D
Pos	Athlete	Pld	W	L	Pts	JPN	SRI	NEP
1	Ayane Morita (JPN)	2	2	0	2	—	3–0	3–0
2	Ruvini Kannangara (SRI)	2	1	1	1	13, 4, 3	—	3–0
3	Manita Chitrakar (NEP)	2	0	2	0	2, 2, 3	9, 2, 3	—

Group E
Pos	Athlete	Pld	W	L	Pts	AOI	SIN	UZB
1	Sutirtha Mukherjee (AOI)	2	2	0	2	—	3–0	3–1
2	Tay Hui Li (SIN)	2	1	1	1	1, 5, 2	—	3–2
3	Regina Kim (UZB)	2	0	2	0	−7, 10, 6, 7	5, 2, −7, −10, 7	—

Group F
Pos	Athlete	Pld	W	L	Pts	HKG	MAS	IRI
1	Lam Yee Lok (HKG)	2	2	0	2	—	3–0	3–0
2	Lim Yi Wen (MAS)	2	1	1	1	3, 4, 4	—	3–1
3	Fatemeh Jamalifar (IRI)	2	0	2	0	3, 6, 3	−9, 5, 7, 6	—

Group G
Pos	Athlete	Pld	W	L	Pts	TPE	KAZ	IRI
1	Chiu Ssu-hua (TPE)	2	2	0	2	—	3–0	3–0
2	Yuliya Ryabova (KAZ)	2	1	1	1	6, 5, 10	—	3–0
3	Zahra Alavi (IRI)	2	0	2	0	3, 1, 3	4, 14, 8	—

Group H
Pos	Athlete	Pld	W	L	Pts	TPE	MAS	MAC
1	Huang Yu-wen (TPE)	2	2	0	2	—	3–1	3–0
2	Angeline Tang (MAS)	2	1	1	1	8, −11, 10, 6	—	3–0
3	Kuok Cheng I (MAC)	2	0	2	0	4, 4, 4	11, 3, 8	—

Group I
Pos	Athlete	Pld	W	L	Pts	KOR	PRK	MGL	LAO
1	Lee Yu-jin (KOR)	3	3	0	3	—	3–0	3–0	3–0
2	Kim Jin-ju (PRK)	3	2	1	2	12, 6, 11	—	3–0	3–0
3	Mergeny Delgermaa (MGL)	3	1	2	1	6, 3, 8	7, 3, 6	—	3–1
4	Sisangvan Phimmayoun (LAO)	3	0	3	0	2, 5, 1	3, 8, 4	−8, 5, 5, 4	—

Group J
Pos	Athlete	Pld	W	L	Pts	KOR	PHI	INA	KUW
1	Lee Seul (KOR)	3	3	0	3	—	3–0	3–0	3–0
2	Emy Rose Dael (PHI)	3	2	1	2	9, 1, 7	—	3–2	3–0
3	Gustin Dwi Jayanti (INA)	3	1	2	1	7, 3, 8	10, −5, −7, 8, 2	—	3–0
4	Maryam Al-Buloushi (KUW)	3	0	3	0	1, 2, 2	1, 1, 3	3, 1, 3	—

Group K
Pos	Athlete	Pld	W	L	Pts	VIE	INA	THA	SYR
1	Vũ Thị Thu Hà (VIE)	3	3	0	3	—	3–1	3–2	3–0
2	Novita Oktariyani (INA)	3	2	1	2	4, −7, 4, 4	—	3–1	3–0
3	Promporn Mahawichian (THA)	3	1	2	1	7, −9, −11, 4, 5	5, −6, 9, 8	—	3–0
4	Worod Ebrahem (SYR)	3	0	3	0	1, 2, 2	4, 4, 7	7, 3, 9	—

Group L
Pos	Athlete	Pld	W	L	Pts	THA	SIN	SRI	LIB
1	Orawan Paranang (THA)	3	3	0	3	—	3–2	3–0	3–1
2	Yee Herng Hwee (SIN)	3	2	1	2	9, −8, −7, 11, 2	—	3–0	3–0
3	Umaya Tharaki (SRI)	3	1	2	1	6, 7, 10	9, 7, 4	—	3–1
4	Patricia Homsy (LIB)	3	0	3	0	−7, 6, 4, 5	1, 7, 4	7, 7, −11, 11	—

Source: Official website

==== Knockout stage ====
Playoffs 1 – 18 August
Vu Lok In (MAC)	1–3 (3–11, 5–11, 11–9, 2–11)	Lim Yi Wen (MAS)
Gaukhar Almagambetova (KAZ)	2–3 (2–11, 11–8, 8–11, 11–6, 5–11)	Souzan Mohammad (SYR)
Kim Jin-ju (PRK)	3–2 (11–3, 6–11, 9–11, 11–6, 11–6)	Emy Rose Dael (PHI)
Yuliya Ryabova (KAZ)	3–1 (11–9, 11–4, 6–11, 11–5)	Ruvini Kannangara (SRI)

Playoffs 2 – 18 August
Yuliya Ryabova (KAZ)	0–3 (8–11, 7–11, 7–11)	Yee Herng Hwee (SIN)
Angeline Tang (MAS)	0–3 (8–11, 8–11, 9–11)	Kim Jin-ju (PRK)
Souzan Mohammad (SYR)	0–3 (12–14, 5–11, 8–11)	Tay Hui Li (SIN)
Novita Oktariyani (INA)	WO	Lim Yi Wen (MAS)

Round of 1/8; 18 August
Liu Gaoyang (CHN)	11	11	11	11
Tay Hui Li (SIN)	1	2	8	5
Orawan Paranang (THA)	11	3	6	9	11	11	5
Chiu Ssu-hua (TPE)	8	11	11	11	9	4	11
Lam Yee Lok (HKG)	11	11	6	11	11
Lee Yu-jin (KOR)	4	9	11	8	7
Kim Jin-ju (PRK)	11	9	5	5	6
Ayane Morita (JPN)	9	11	11	11	11
Zhu Chaohui (CHN)	11	11	11	11
Yee Herng Hwee (SIN)	5	6	6	4
Vũ Thị Thu Hà (VIE)	5	10	11	10	5
Huang Yu-wen (TPE)	11	12	3	12	11
Sutirtha Mukherjee (AOI)	7	7	11	4
Lee Seul (KOR)	11	11	13	11
Lim Yi Wen (MAS)	8	3	1	5
Doo Hoi Kem (HKG)	11	11	11	11

Quarterfinals; 19 August
Liu Gaoyang (CHN)	11	8	11	11	11
Chiu Ssu-hua (TPE)	7	11	8	9	7
Lam Yee Lok (HKG)	14	11	11	11
Ayane Morita (JPN)	12	2	5	8
Zhu Chaohui (CHN)	11	11	12	11
Huang Yu-wen (TPE)	5	5	10	6
Lee Seul (KOR)	6	4	11	9	4
Doo Hoi Kem (HKG)	11	11	7	11	11

Semifinals; 19 August
Liu Gaoyang (CHN)	11	14	11	11
Lam Yee Lok (HKG)	3	12	9	7
Zhu Chaohui (CHN)	11	11	11	10	11
Doo Hoi Kem (HKG)	6	8	5	12	9

Final; 19 August
Liu Gaoyang (CHN)	3	11	11	16	9	5	11
Zhu Chaohui (CHN)	11	8	7	14	11	11	6
