= Shooting at the 2013 Asian Youth Games =

Sports event

- Venue: Fangshan Shooting Hall
- Dates: 18–21 August 2013

Shooting sports at the 2013 Asian Youth Games was held in Fangshan Shooting Hall, Nanjing, China between 18 and 21 August 2013.

== Medalists ==
=== Boys ===
Event	Gold	Silver	Bronze
10 m air pistol	Wu Jiayu; China	Shainki Nagar; Independent Olympic Athletes	Refat Girfanov; Uzbekistan
10 m air rifle	Wang Yuefeng; China	Sean Tay; Singapore	Pongsaton Panyatong; Thailand
Trap	Mohammad Al-Hammli; Kuwait	Chai Zhouyang; China	Yang Kun-pi; Chinese Taipei
Skeet	Alexandr Mukhamediyev; Kazakhstan	Khaled Al-Mansoori; Qatar	David Pochivalov; Kazakhstan

=== Girls ===
Event	Gold	Silver	Bronze
10 m air pistol	Kim Eun-yeong; South Korea	Teh Xiu Yi; Singapore	Princhuda Methaweewong; Thailand
10 m air rifle	He Zichao; China	Kim Je-hee; South Korea	Martina Veloso; Singapore
Trap	Deng Weiyun; China	Marzieh Parvareshnia; Iran	Gao Wendi; China
Skeet	Che Yufei; China	Sarah Ghulam Mohammed; Qatar	Yu Tianyuan; China

== Medal table ==
Rank	Nation	Gold	Silver	Bronze	Total
1	China (CHN)	5	1	2	8
2	South Korea (KOR)	1	1	0	2
3	Kazakhstan (KAZ)	1	0	1	2
4	Kuwait (KUW)	1	0	0	1
5	Singapore (SIN)	0	2	1	3
6	Qatar (QAT)	0	2	0	2
7	Independent Olympic Athletes (AOI)	0	1	0	1
7	Iran (IRI)	0	1	0	1
9	Thailand (THA)	0	0	2	2
10	Chinese Taipei (TPE)	0	0	1	1
10	Uzbekistan (UZB)	0	0	1	1
Totals (11 entries)		8	8	8	24

== Results ==
=== Boys ===
==== 10 m air pistol ====
21 August

Rank	Athlete	Qual.	Final
1st place, gold medalist(s)	Wu Jiayu (CHN)	573	195.5
2nd place, silver medalist(s)	Shainki Nagar (AOI)	565	195.3
3rd place, bronze medalist(s)	Refat Girfanov (UZB)	563	174.7
4	Kim Cheong-yong (KOR)	570	152.5
5	Samarjit Singh (AOI)	561	134.0
6	Ganbaataryn Buyanbaatar (MGL)	566	115.0
7	Lim Dong-hoon (KOR)	566	95.0
8	Huang Wei-hsiang (TPE)	570	75.6
9	Ganzorigiin Altanbagana (MGL)	561	
10	Sukhrab Turdiyev (KAZ)	561	
11	Li Hang (CHN)	560	
12	Morteza Alimohammadi (IRI)	560	
13	Paul Ang (SIN)	558	
14	Ray Ang (SIN)	558	
15	Abdul Hadi Abd Malek (MAS)	557	
16	Siau Zianyi (MAS)	555	
17	Sophonwish Amaruk (THA)	554	
18	Peechnat Khlaisuban (THA)	552	
19	Kirill Tyavin (KAZ)	551	
20	Ilham Maulana (INA)	551	
21	Su Chia-wu (TPE)	550	
22	Kourosh Mohammadyari (IRI)	546	
23	Trần Tuấn Anh (VIE)	545	
24	Chan Ko Ko (MYA)	543	
25	Khalefah Al-Thefeery (KUW)	543	
26	Song Chol-jin (PRK)	543	
27	Dmitrii Gutnik (KGZ)	541	
28	Dawood Smait (KUW)	538	
29	Hamza Suleman (PAK)	538	
30	Ahmad Zayed Al-Shamari (QAT)	536	
31	Enrique Qazmin (PHI)	528	
32	Trần Công Hiệu (VIE)	525	
33	Nyoman Meta Ambara (INA)	511	

==== 10 m air rifle ====
19 August

Rank	Athlete	Qual.	Final
1st place, gold medalist(s)	Wang Yuefeng (CHN)	616.3	208.7
2nd place, silver medalist(s)	Sean Tay (SIN)	613.4	205.6
3rd place, bronze medalist(s)	Pongsaton Panyatong (THA)	619.3	184.2
4	Nam Tae-yun (KOR)	615.9	163.6
5	Lu Shao-chuan (TPE)	616.6	143.9
6	Mahyar Sedaghat (IRI)	616.5	121.3
7	Yoon Hyun (KOR)	615.5	99.3
8	Jiang Xuan (CHN)	615.0	77.9
9	Keith Chan (SIN)	612.7	
10	Tomohiko Hasegawa (JPN)	612.7	
11	Virbhadra Vijay Salokhe (AOI)	612.1	
12	Risalatul Islam (BAN)	611.0	
13	Hamoun Yousefi (IRI)	610.7	
14	Niko Alvian (INA)	610.5	
15	Pratik Borse (AOI)	609.6	
16	Ariunbadralyn Dölgöön (MGL)	607.7	
17	Bogdan Seitzhanov (KAZ)	607.5	
18	Vadim Skorovarov (UZB)	607.0	
19	Muhammad Ramadhani (INA)	605.8	
20	Saidkhon Sayfuddinov (UZB)	605.4	
21	Hasanul Banna Akash (BAN)	605.0	
22	Tümenjargalyn Khash-Erdene (MGL)	603.8	
23	Celdon Arellano (PHI)	602.9	
24	Nattapat Jamkaja (THA)	602.0	
25	Zul Haziq Rosli (MAS)	601.7	
26	Bùi Anh Tùng (VIE)	596.9	
27	Maad Karb (IRQ)	595.9	
28	Khant Myo Zin (MYA)	595.5	
29	Mubarak Al-Subaie (KUW)	595.1	
30	Bandar Al-Mutairi (KUW)	594.6	
31	Mohammed Al-Mubarak (QAT)	592.9	
32	Nur Mohd Izham Azwi (MAS)	589.6	
33	Võ Đình Kiệt (VIE)	584.4	
34	Koen Omar Odayar (SRI)	582.3	
35	Ali Maan (IRQ)	579.5	
36	Timur Issayev (KAZ)	578.1	
37	Chimi Rinzin (BHU)	577.2	

==== Trap ====
20–21 August

Rank	Athlete	Qual.	SF	Bronze	Gold
1st place, gold medalist(s)	Mohammad Al-Hammli (KUW)	109	13		12
2nd place, silver medalist(s)	Chai Zhouyang (CHN)	112	13		11
3rd place, bronze medalist(s)	Yang Kun-pi (TPE)	113	11	11^{3}	
4	Mark Pochivalov (KAZ)	111	11	11^{2}	
5	Behzad Iranmanesh (IRI)	103^{1}	10		
6	Bradley Wong (SIN)	106	8		
7	Akash Saharan (AOI)	103^{0}			
8	Yu Haicheng (CHN)	102			
9	Abhay Singh Rathore (AOI)	101			
10	Ryu Han-yeol (KOR)	99			
11	Sultan Al-Naemi (QAT)	96			
12	Matthew Yeoh (MAS)	93			
13	Sutee Chonprasert (THA)	91			
14	Ruslan Berdov (KAZ)	91			
15	Naser Al-Khalidi (KUW)	91			
16	Kaushan Samaranayake (SRI)	74			

==== Skeet ====
18–19 August

Rank	Athlete	Qual.	SF	Bronze	Gold
1st place, gold medalist(s)	Alexandr Mukhamediyev (KAZ)	106^{2}	11		14
2nd place, silver medalist(s)	Khaled Al-Mansoori (QAT)	115	11		11
3rd place, bronze medalist(s)	David Pochivalov (KAZ)	111	10^{2}	10	
4	Joseph Lee (MAS)	107	10^{2}	9	
5	Lu Jiahao (CHN)	113	10^{1}		
6	Zhu Ziyu (CHN)	113	9		
7	Anantjeet Singh Naruka (AOI)	106^{1}			
8	Naser Al-Mutairi (KUW)	103			
9	Hamza Sheikh (AOI)	101			
10	Tanapat Jangpanich (THA)	101			
11	Bader Al-Daihani (KUW)	95			
12	Thani Al-Mansoori (KUW)	81			

=== Girls ===
==== 10 m air pistol ====
20 August

Rank	Athlete	Qual.	Final
1st place, gold medalist(s)	Kim Eun-yeong (KOR)	376	198.4
2nd place, silver medalist(s)	Teh Xiu Yi (SIN)	373	195.4
3rd place, bronze medalist(s)	Princhuda Methaweewong (THA)	372	176.8
4	Chen Jiaying (CHN)	377	155.6
5	Malaika Goel (AOI)	375	135.7
6	Yun Sun-im (PRK)	376	113.3
7	Yashaswini Singh Deswal (AOI)	373	92.8
8	Mend-Amaryn Buyankhishig (MGL)	373	71.1
9	Chua Shin Yoong (SIN)	371	
10	Kim Min-jung (KOR)	371	
11	Cao Lijia (CHN)	370	
12	Yelena Gubareva (KAZ)	366	
13	Eva Yulianti Pratiwi (INA)	366	
14	Manijeh Zare (IRI)	365	
15	Chung Ting-yu (TPE)	364	
16	Derli Amalia Putri (INA)	364	
17	Hanieh Rostamian (IRI)	361	
18	Nur Hidayah Zulkifli (MAS)	360	
19	Bayarchimegiin Delgerjargal (MGL)	360	
20	Noora Al-Mutawa (QAT)	359	
21	Dana Suleman (QAT)	359	
22	Jawaher Al-Maazmi (UAE)	358	
23	Nguyễn Thị Quỳnh Nga (VIE)	358	
24	Fatima Azim (PAK)	357	
25	Hung Yun-chia (TPE)	355	
26	Sophia Graciela Reyes (PHI)	353	
27	Sabira Assadi (KAZ)	352	
28	Cheryl Augustine (MAS)	348	
29	Keeratika Charoenchai (THA)	348	
30	Angelo Dimaculangan (PHI)	347	
31	Phạm Thị Ngọc Châu (VIE)	347	
32	Shekha Al-Obaidli (UAE)	344	
33	Kamila Iskhakova (UZB)	329	

==== 10 m air rifle ====
18 August

Rank	Athlete	Qual.	Final
1st place, gold medalist(s)	He Zichao (CHN)	415.9	205.3
2nd place, silver medalist(s)	Kim Je-hee (KOR)	409.1	203.9
3rd place, bronze medalist(s)	Martina Veloso (SIN)	409.8	185.2
4	Yodtean Prathumtong (THA)	409.1	164.7
5	Leona Yeo (SIN)	413.4	142.3
6	Mampi Das (AOI)	412.3	122.3
7	Najmeh Khedmati (IRI)	411.2	101.4
8	Fatemeh Karamzadeh (IRI)	409.1	79.4
9	Nur Dayana Hijrah (MAS)	408.0	
10	Yasmin Tahlak (UAE)	407.4	
11	Choi Sun-seon (KOR)	406.6	
12	Amparo Acuña (PHI)	406.5	
13	Nergüin Angirmaa (MGL)	406.2	
14	Liu Yishuo (CHN)	406.0	
15	Anuradha Khude (AOI)	404.0	
16	Nahoko Kawai (JPN)	403.9	
17	Aisha Al-Mutawa (QAT)	402.7	
18	Bermet Imanalieva (KGZ)	402.0	
19	Praneetta Vasudevan (SRI)	401.8	
20	Chotirat Thiranuwattanakul (THA)	399.6	
21	Wayne Aulya Pradheta (INA)	399.0	
22	Kendah Al-Zayed (KUW)	398.4	
23	Violetta Starostina (KAZ)	397.9	
24	Hebah Arzouqi (KUW)	397.3	
25	Nur Afifah Tarmizy (MAS)	396.9	
26	Miku Matsumoto (JPN)	396.7	
27	Sharmin Akter (BAN)	396.0	
28	Svetlana Vitko (KAZ)	395.7	
29	Dorjsürengiin Khaliun (MGL)	395.0	
30	Willia Ponda Saputri (INA)	394.2	
31	Nguyễn Huyền Trang (VIE)	393.9	
32	Sharmin Akter Sultana (BAN)	393.2	
33	Phùng Thị Lan Hương (VIE)	392.9	
34	Aisha Al-Suwaidi (QAT)	390.3	
35	Antisar Ghulam (UAE)	385.0	
36	Ayesha Nadeem (NEP)	382.3	
37	Dechen Lhamo (BHU)	379.4	
38	Zainab Ali (IRQ)	377.2	
39	Rand Safaa (IRQ)	373.4	

==== Trap ====
20 August

Rank	Athlete	Qual.	SF	Bronze	Gold
1st place, gold medalist(s)	Deng Weiyun (CHN)	64	10		10^{1}
2nd place, silver medalist(s)	Marzieh Parvareshnia (IRI)	57	10		10^{0}
3rd place, bronze medalist(s)	Gao Wendi (CHN)	61	7^{1}	11	
4	Malika Wig (AOI)	58	9	6	
5	Sarsenkul Rysbekova (KAZ)	41	7^{0}		
—	Badryah Al-Binali (QAT)	DNS			

==== Skeet ====
18 August

Rank	Athlete	Qual.	SF	Bronze	Gold
1st place, gold medalist(s)	Che Yufei (CHN)	68	11		11
2nd place, silver medalist(s)	Sarah Ghulam Mohammed (QAT)	61	12		10
3rd place, bronze medalist(s)	Yu Tianyuan (CHN)	66	10	11	
4	Chalalai Nasakul (THA)	63	7^{2}	9	
5	Maheshwari Chauhan (AOI)	44	7^{1}		
6	Hajar Ghulam Mohammed (QAT)	62	7^{0}		
7	Anastassiya Shapran (KAZ)	43			
8	Alina Assanova (KAZ)	38			
