= Judo at the 2013 Asian Youth Games =

Judo competition

- Venue: Longjiang Gymnasium
- Dates: 17–19 August 2013

Judo at the 2013 Asian Youth Games was held in Longjiang Gymnasium, Nanjing, China between 17 and 19 August 2013.

== Medalists ==
=== Boys ===
Event	Gold	Silver	Bronze
−55 kg	Doston Ruziev; Uzbekistan	Lee Tae-jong; South Korea	Anatoliy Durachenko; Kazakhstan
−55 kg	Doston Ruziev; Uzbekistan	Lee Tae-jong; South Korea	Zembyn Tüshigtör; Mongolia
−66 kg	Ko Jae-kyoung; South Korea	Ulugbek Otamurodov; Uzbekistan	Kim Chol-gwang; North Korea
−66 kg	Ko Jae-kyoung; South Korea	Ulugbek Otamurodov; Uzbekistan	Tsai Ming-yen; Chinese Taipei
−81 kg	An Jae-sang; South Korea	Mukhriddin Mirzayorov; Uzbekistan	Salim Farukhi; Tajikistan
−81 kg	An Jae-sang; South Korea	Mukhriddin Mirzayorov; Uzbekistan	Iman Nikeghbal; Iran

=== Girls ===
Event	Gold	Silver	Bronze
−44 kg	O Son-hui; North Korea	Lin Wan-chu; Chinese Taipei	Mongjam Kabita Devi; Independent Olympic Athletes
−44 kg	O Son-hui; North Korea	Lin Wan-chu; Chinese Taipei	Diyora Keldiyorova; Uzbekistan
−52 kg	Kim Jin-a; North Korea	Lee Dong-hyeon; South Korea	Liu Jinhui; China
−52 kg	Kim Jin-a; North Korea	Lee Dong-hyeon; South Korea	Tseregbaataryn Khulan; Mongolia
−63 kg	Kim Ji-jeong; South Korea	Lin Yizhuo; China	Zhanar Kashkyn; Kazakhstan
−63 kg	Kim Ji-jeong; South Korea	Lin Yizhuo; China	Tursunpasha Nurmetova; Uzbekistan

== Medal table ==
Rank	Nation	Gold	Silver	Bronze	Total
1	South Korea (KOR)	3	2	0	5
2	North Korea (PRK)	2	0	1	3
3	Uzbekistan (UZB)	1	2	2	5
4	China (CHN)	0	1	1	2
4	Chinese Taipei (TPE)	0	1	1	2
6	Kazakhstan (KAZ)	0	0	2	2
6	Mongolia (MGL)	0	0	2	2
8	Independent Olympic Athletes (AOI)	0	0	1	1
8	Iran (IRI)	0	0	1	1
8	Tajikistan (TJK)	0	0	1	1
Totals (10 entries)		6	6	12	24

== Results ==
=== Boys ===
==== 55 kg ====
17 August

Preliminary
Jawad Ahmadi (AFG)	021–000	Nguyễn Thanh Tâm (VIE)
Pan Yang (CHN)	111–000	Al-Hassan Al-Kodsh (QAT)
Moumen Mahfouz (SYR)	000–000	Alibek Choroev (KGZ)
Soukphaxay Sithisane (LAO)	100–000	Vikas Kharb (AOI)
Lee Tae-jong (KOR)	010–000	Mohammad Reza Sedighi (IRI)
Ali Al-Farran (YEM)	000–100	Lio Chon Hou (MAC)
Floyd Rillera (PHI)	001–001	Ahmed Abu-Rumaila (PLE)
Kadyr Rejepgulyýew (TKM)	000–100	Chin Kuan-ting (TPE)
Zembyn Tüshigtör (MGL)	WO	Abdulmajeed Khered (KSA)
Rakhmatullobek Farkhodov (TJK)	000–100	Anatoliy Durachenko (KAZ)
Abdullah Al-Sulaimani (KUW)	000–001	Naim Teyrouz (LIB)

Preliminary
Jawad Ahmadi (AFG)	000
Panachai Janluechai (THA)	100
Pan Yang (CHN)	000
Alibek Choroev (KGZ)	100
Soukphaxay Sithisane (LAO)	000
Lee Tae-jong (KOR)	001
Lio Chon Hou (MAC)	101
Leung Hon Man (HKG)	000
Floyd Rillera (PHI)	000
Doston Ruziev (UZB)	100
Septian Ajiyangsyah (INA)	000
Chin Kuan-ting (TPE)	100
Zembyn Tüshigtör (MGL)	001
Ri Tae-il (PRK)	000
Anatoliy Durachenko (KAZ)	100
Naim Teyrouz (LIB)	000

Quarterfinals
Panachai Janluechai (THA)	000
Alibek Choroev (KGZ)	020
Lee Tae-jong (KOR)	001
Lio Chon Hou (MAC)	000
Doston Ruziev (UZB)	000
Chin Kuan-ting (TPE)	000
Zembyn Tüshigtör (MGL)	000
Anatoliy Durachenko (KAZ)	020

Semifinals
Alibek Choroev (KGZ)	000
Lee Tae-jong (KOR)	100
Doston Ruziev (UZB)	100
Anatoliy Durachenko (KAZ)	000

Final
Lee Tae-jong (KOR)	000
Doston Ruziev (UZB)	000

Repechage
Panachai Janluechai (THA)	101
Lio Chon Hou (MAC)	000
Chin Kuan-ting (TPE)	001
Zembyn Tüshigtör (MGL)	001

Bronze medal contests
Panachai Janluechai (THA)	000
Anatoliy Durachenko (KAZ)	101
Zembyn Tüshigtör (MGL)	001
Alibek Choroev (KGZ)	000

==== 66 kg ====
18 August

Preliminary
Fares Badawi (SYR)	100–000	Walter Soh (SIN)
Tsai Ming-yen (TPE)	110–000	Abdullah Hamad (KSA)
Mönkhdalaigiin Mönkh-Erdene (MGL)	100–000	Rashad Al-Mashjari (UAE)
Kemal Amanow (TKM)	101–000	Mustafa Saleh (YEM)
Ko Jae-kyoung (KOR)	002–000	Vijay Kumar Yadav (AOI)
Kim Chol-gwang (PRK)	110–000	Ahmed Amira (PLE)
Islambek Yergeshov (KAZ)	100–000	Wan Ka Lok (MAC)
Farhan Uzair Fikri (MAS)	100–000	Putu Bagus Pradnya (INA)
Abdullah Al-Fadhli (KUW)	001–100	Jann Ken Raquepo (PHI)
Rasul Saidov (TJK)	010–000	Ali Popalzai (AFG)

Preliminary
Surasak Puntanam (THA)	010
Fares Badawi (SYR)	000
Tsai Ming-yen (TPE)	021
Mehdi Fathipour (IRI)	010
Mönkhdalaigiin Mönkh-Erdene (MGL)	010
Kemal Amanow (TKM)	000
Ko Jae-kyoung (KOR)	100
Hà Quốc Chiến (VIE)	000
Kim Chol-gwang (PRK)	011
Islambek Yergeshov (KAZ)	000
Farhan Uzair Fikri (MAS)	100
Himprawa Khatri (NEP)	000
Zeng Xianyan (CHN)	100
Jann Ken Raquepo (PHI)	000
Rasul Saidov (TJK)	000
Ulugbek Otamurodov (UZB)	021

Quarterfinals
Surasak Puntanam (THA)	000
Tsai Ming-yen (TPE)	100
Mönkhdalaigiin Mönkh-Erdene (MGL)	000
Ko Jae-kyoung (KOR)	110
Kim Chol-gwang (PRK)	100
Farhan Uzair Fikri (MAS)	000
Zeng Xianyan (CHN)	000
Ulugbek Otamurodov (UZB)	002

Semifinals
Tsai Ming-yen (TPE)	000
Ko Jae-kyoung (KOR)	001
Kim Chol-gwang (PRK)	000
Ulugbek Otamurodov (UZB)	100

Final
Ko Jae-kyoung (KOR)	100
Ulugbek Otamurodov (UZB)	000

Repechage
Surasak Puntanam (THA)	100
Mönkhdalaigiin Mönkh-Erdene (MGL)	000
Farhan Uzair Fikri (MAS)	010
Zeng Xianyan (CHN)	101

Bronze medal contests
Surasak Puntanam (THA)	000
Kim Chol-gwang (PRK)	020
Zeng Xianyan (CHN)	000
Tsai Ming-yen (TPE)	100

==== 81 kg ====
19 August

Preliminary
Iman Nikeghbal (IRI)	000–000	Nabi Aliýew (TKM)
Ra Hyon-mo (PRK)	000–000	Natdanai Netthip (THA)
Saif Al-Zaabi (UAE)	000–100	Mukhriddin Mirzayorov (UZB)
Ermek Sariev (KGZ)	001–000	Osama Al-Zahrani (KSA)
Renzo Miguel Cazeñas (PHI)	000–020	Vinay Kumar (AOI)
Ibrahim Al-Amro (JOR)	000–110	An Jae-sang (KOR)
Mustiko Adi Samudero (INA)	000–110	Ganboldyn Balsanlkhündev (MGL)
Huang Kai-lun (TPE)	101–000	Phạm Thành Tín (VIE)
Sohrab Totakhil (AFG)	WO	Salim Farukhi (TJK)

Preliminary
Anthony Hajjar (LIB)	000
Iman Nikeghbal (IRI)	100
Ra Hyon-mo (PRK)	000
Yerassyl Bolat (KAZ)	010
Fady Tawfik (QAT)	000
Mukhriddin Mirzayorov (UZB)	100
Ibaida Mohammed (PLE)	000
Ermek Sariev (KGZ)	100
Vinay Kumar (AOI)	000
Lain Htone (MYA)	100
An Jae-sang (KOR)	001
Ganboldyn Balsanlkhündev (MGL)	000
Huang Kai-lun (TPE)	001
Zhang Xin (CHN)	000
Salim Farukhi (TJK)	100
Miguel Costa (MAC)	000

Quarterfinals
Iman Nikeghbal (IRI)	100
Yerassyl Bolat (KAZ)	000
Mukhriddin Mirzayorov (UZB)	000
Ermek Sariev (KGZ)	000
Lain Htone (MYA)	000
An Jae-sang (KOR)	100
Huang Kai-lun (TPE)	000
Salim Farukhi (TJK)	012

Semifinals
Iman Nikeghbal (IRI)	000
Mukhriddin Mirzayorov (UZB)	011
An Jae-sang (KOR)	000
Salim Farukhi (TJK)	000

Final
Mukhriddin Mirzayorov (UZB)	000
An Jae-sang (KOR)	011

Repechage
Yerassyl Bolat (KAZ)	100
Ermek Sariev (KGZ)	000
Lain Htone (MYA)	001
Huang Kai-lun (TPE)	000

Bronze medal contests
Yerassyl Bolat (KAZ)	000
Salim Farukhi (TJK)	100
Lain Htone (MYA)	000
Iman Nikeghbal (IRI)	100

=== Girls ===
==== 44 kg ====
17 August

Preliminary
Nguyễn Minh Thư (VIE)
Ulýana Nazarowa (TKM)	WO
Anggun Nurajijah (INA)	010
Shukrona Qarchieva (TJK)	100
Miam Salvador (PHI)	000
O Son-hui (PRK)	021
Aida Karchayeva (KAZ)	001
Pittayarut Benyamas (THA)	001
Roaa Shawkara (YEM)
Mongjam Kabita Devi (AOI)	WO
Xu Zhuan (CHN)	000
Diyora Keldiyorova (UZB)	000
Lin Wan-chu (TPE)	100
Fatemeh Shabani (IRI)	000

Quarterfinals
Ulýana Nazarowa (TKM)	100
Shukrona Qarchieva (TJK)	000
O Son-hui (PRK)	100
Aida Karchayeva (KAZ)	000
Mongjam Kabita Devi (AOI)	000
Kim Eun-ji (KOR)	000
Diyora Keldiyorova (UZB)	010
Lin Wan-chu (TPE)	102

Semifinals
Ulýana Nazarowa (TKM)	000
O Son-hui (PRK)	001
Mongjam Kabita Devi (AOI)	001
Lin Wan-chu (TPE)	020

Final
O Son-hui (PRK)	021
Lin Wan-chu (TPE)	000

Repechage
Shukrona Qarchieva (TJK)	000
Aida Karchayeva (KAZ)	101
Kim Eun-ji (KOR)	000
Diyora Keldiyorova (UZB)	010

Bronze medal contests
Aida Karchayeva (KAZ)	000
Mongjam Kabita Devi (AOI)	100
Diyora Keldiyorova (UZB)	100
Ulýana Nazarowa (TKM)	000

==== 52 kg ====
18 August

Preliminary
Dhekra Shawkara (YEM)	000–100	Mobina Azizi (IRI)
Rungnapa Sompan (THA)	000–020	Dildor Shermetova (UZB)
Tseregbaataryn Khulan (MGL)	000–000	Pinky Balhara (AOI)
Fara Aida Sofia (MAS)	000–100	Kim Jin-a (PRK)

Preliminary
Remal Al-Hawi (JOR)	000
Thu The Theint Theint (MYA)	100
Symbat Talantbek Kyzy (KGZ)	110
Mobina Azizi (IRI)	000
Dildor Shermetova (UZB)	000
Lee Dong-hyeon (KOR)	101
Dewa Ayu Warta (INA)	000
Nguyễn Thị Ngọc Hân (VIE)	000
Tseregbaataryn Khulan (MGL)	000
Wang Tien-lan (TPE)	000
Dinara Rozykulowa (TKM)	000
Liu Jinhui (CHN)	102
Ho Lok Si (MAC)	000
Aigerim Amanzhanova (KAZ)	100
Kim Jin-a (PRK)	101
Bahrigul Babieva (TJK)	000

Quarterfinals
Thu The Theint Theint (MYA)	101
Symbat Talantbek Kyzy (KGZ)	001
Lee Dong-hyeon (KOR)	100
Dewa Ayu Warta (INA)	000
Tseregbaataryn Khulan (MGL)	000
Liu Jinhui (CHN)	000
Aigerim Amanzhanova (KAZ)	000
Kim Jin-a (PRK)	101

Semifinals
Thu The Theint Theint (MYA)	000
Lee Dong-hyeon (KOR)	110
Liu Jinhui (CHN)	000
Kim Jin-a (PRK)	100

Final
Lee Dong-hyeon (KOR)	000
Kim Jin-a (PRK)	100

Repechage
Symbat Talantbek Kyzy (KGZ)	000
Dewa Ayu Warta (INA)	100
Tseregbaataryn Khulan (MGL)	000
Aigerim Amanzhanova (KAZ)	000

Bronze medal contests
Dewa Ayu Warta (INA)	000
Liu Jinhui (CHN)	000
Tseregbaataryn Khulan (MGL)	102
Thu The Theint Theint (MYA)	000

==== 63 kg ====
19 August

Preliminary
Phupu Lhamu Khatri (NEP)	020–000	Dina Bseiso (JOR)

Preliminary
Tursunpasha Nurmetova (UZB)	100
Mitlesh (AOI)	000
Hevrilia Windawati (INA)	020
Mohaddeseh Khishvand (IRI)	000
Zhanar Kashkyn (KAZ)	100
Ri Ji-hyang (PRK)	000
Somsoudalath Venevankham (LAO)	000
Kim Ji-jeong (KOR)	100
Suttida Aiamim (THA)	000
Lin Yizhuo (CHN)	100
Phupu Lhamu Khatri (NEP)	000
Battulgyn Khongorzul (MGL)	100
Chang Ssu-tzu (TPE)	010
Elmira Akishova (KGZ)	000
Nguyễn Thị Thu Nguyên (VIE)	001
Nilufar Muhiddinowa (TKM)	000

Quarterfinals
Tursunpasha Nurmetova (UZB)	000
Hevrilia Windawati (INA)	000
Zhanar Kashkyn (KAZ)	000
Kim Ji-jeong (KOR)	001
Lin Yizhuo (CHN)	010
Battulgyn Khongorzul (MGL)	001
Chang Ssu-tzu (TPE)	020
Nguyễn Thị Thu Nguyên (VIE)	000

Semifinals
Tursunpasha Nurmetova (UZB)	000
Kim Ji-jeong (KOR)	000
Lin Yizhuo (CHN)	010
Chang Ssu-tzu (TPE)	000

Final
Kim Ji-jeong (KOR)	101
Lin Yizhuo (CHN)	000

Repechage
Hevrilia Windawati (INA)	000
Zhanar Kashkyn (KAZ)	020
Battulgyn Khongorzul (MGL)	101
Nguyễn Thị Thu Nguyên (VIE)	000

Bronze medal contests
Zhanar Kashkyn (KAZ)	100
Chang Ssu-tzu (TPE)	000
Battulgyn Khongorzul (MGL)	000
Tursunpasha Nurmetova (UZB)	100
