= Soukphaxay Sithisane =

Laotian judoka (born 1996)

Personal information
- Nickname: Larnoy
- Nationality: Laotian
- Born: 1 May 1996 (age 30) Vientiane, Laos
- Occupation: Judoka
- Height: 160 cm (5 ft 3 in)

Sport
- Country: Laos
- Sport: Judo
- Weight class: –60 kg

Profile at external databases
- IJF: 12448
- JudoInside.com: 47490
- Updated on 30 October 2021

Soukphaxay Sithisane (born 1 May 1996) is a Laotian judoka.

He competed at the 2016 Summer Olympics in Rio de Janeiro, in the men's 60 kg, but was defeated in the first round by Tsai Ming-yen.

He represented Laos at the 2020 Summer Olympics in Tokyo, Japan. He was eliminated in his first match in the men's 60 kg event.

== Honours ==
- SEA Games: (bronze) bronze 2015, (silver) silver 2023
