= Yerassyl Kaiyrbek =

Kazakhstani taekwondo practitioner

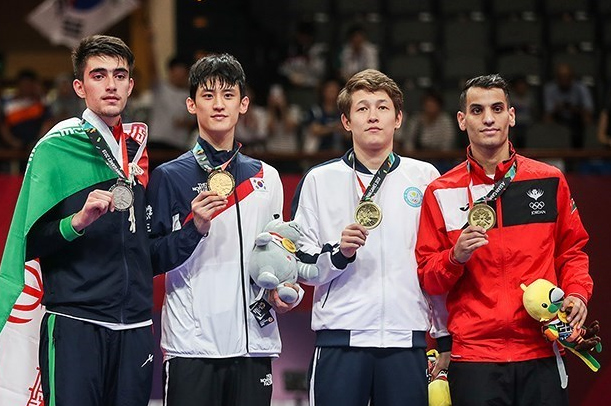
- Yerassyl Kaiyrbek in 2018 (second from right)

Personal information
- Born: 3 December 1996 (age 29)

Sport
- Country: Kazakhstan
- Sport: Taekwondo
Medal record
Men's taekwondo
Representing Kazakhstan
Asian Games
Bronze medal – third place	2018 Jakarta	68 kg
Asian Youth Games
Bronze medal – third place	2013 Nanjing	53 kg

Yerassyl Kaiyrbek (Ерасыл Анарбекұлы Қайырбек, born 3 December 1996) is a Kazakhstani taekwondo practitioner. He won one of the bronze medals in the men's 68 kg event at the 2018 Asian Games held in Jakarta, Indonesia.

In 2013, he won one of the bronze medals in the boys' 53 kg event at the Asian Youth Games held in Nanjing, China. He represented Kazakhstan at the 2014 Asian Games held in Incheon, South Korea in the men's 63 kg event where he was eliminated in his first match by Lee Dae-hoon of South Korea.
