= Pauline Lopez =

Filipino taekwondo practitioner

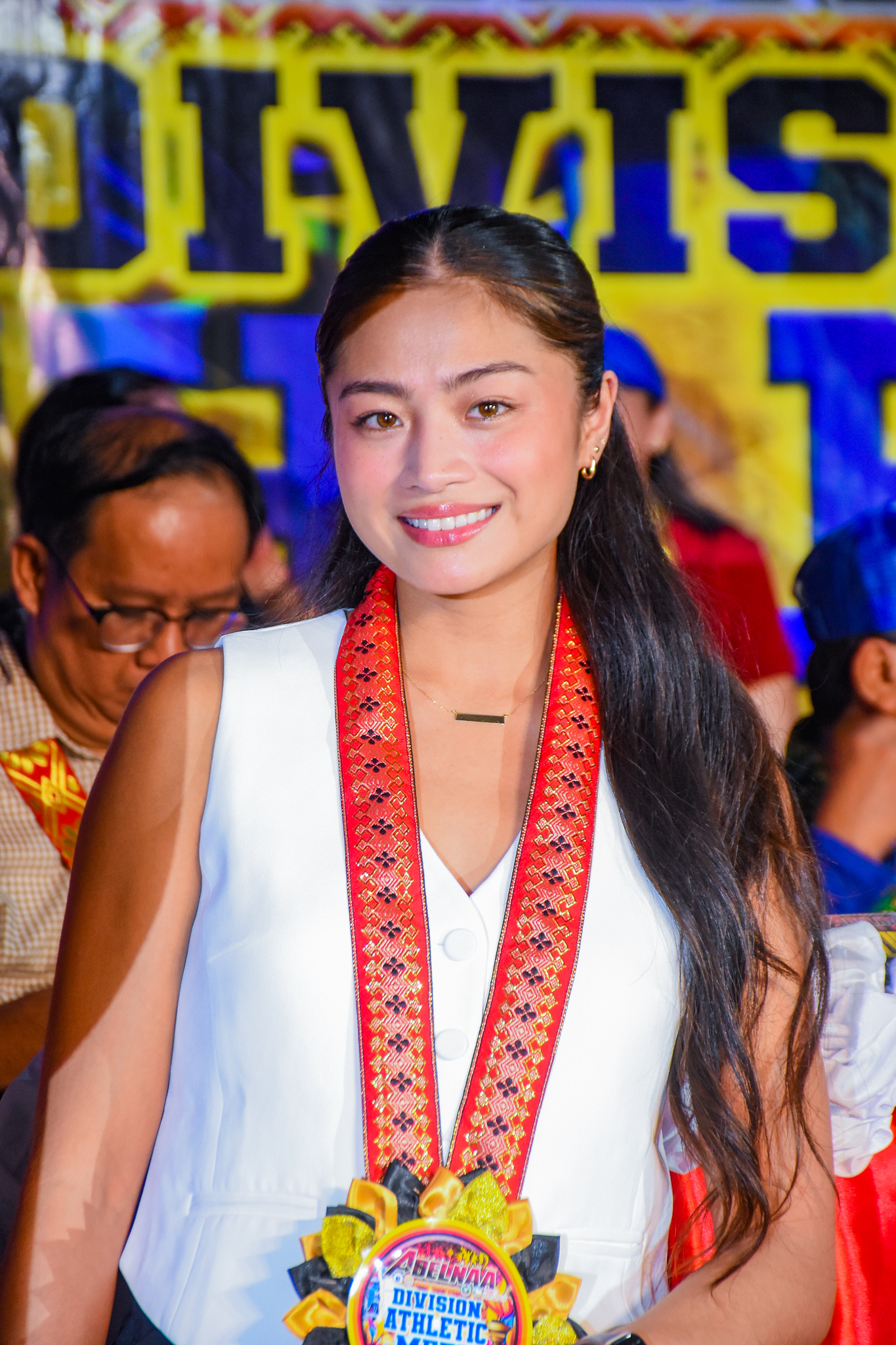
- Lopez in 2024

Personal information
- Full name: Pauline Louise Lopez
- Born: 17 August 1996 (age 29)

Sport
- Country: Philippines
- Sport: Taekwondo
Medal record
Women's taekwondo
Representing Philippines
Southeast Asian Games
Gold medal – first place	2015 Singapore	57 kg
Gold medal – first place	2019 Manila	57 kg
Bronze medal – third place	2013 Naypyidaw	53 kg
Bronze medal – third place	2017 Kuala Lumpur	62 kg
Asian Games
Bronze medal – third place	2018 Jakarta	57 kg
Asian Taekwondo Championships
Gold medal – first place	2016 Pasay	57 kg
Asian Youth Games
Gold medal – first place	2013 Nanjing	55 kg

Pauline Louise Lopez (born 17 August 1996) is a Filipino taekwondo practitioner. She is a two-time gold medalist at the Southeast Asian Games and a bronze medalist at the Asian Games.

== Early life ==
Lopez was born on August 17, 1996, in Los Angeles, California. She began practicing taekwondo at age seven, as her father Efren Lopez Sr. was part of the national team of the martial art back in the late ’80s. She was inspired to take up the sport after being told she couldn't because she was a girl. Her father initially opposed her taekwondo participation due to gender stereotypes and the physical nature of the sport. Lopez's talent caught her father's notice after her initial two years in the sport. He pushed his daughter until she made the national team in the Philippines in 2010.

At age 13, Lopez moved to the Philippines from California to pursue her taekwondo dreams, making the sacrifice of being away from her family. From the age of 14, her grandmother played a key role in her training, accompanying her daily to practice via LRT.

== Career ==
Lopez competed in the women's 46 kg event at the 2010 Asian Games held in Guangzhou, China, making her the youngest among Filipino delegates to the multi-sport continental event. She was eliminated in her second match by Dana Haidar of Jordan. The following year, she competed in the women's finweight event at the 2011 World Taekwondo Championships held in Gyeongju, South Korea where she was eliminated in her first match.

In 2013, Lopez competed in the women's bantamweight event at the 2013 World Taekwondo Championships held in Puebla, Mexico. She won her first match against Yeny Contreras of Chile and also her next match against Ivett Gonda of Hungary but she was then eliminated from the competition by Janike Lai of Norway. A month later, she won the gold medal in the girls' 55 kg event at the 2013 Asian Youth Games held in Nanjing, China. In the final she defeated Fariza Aldangorova of Kazakhstan. In the women's 57 kg event at the 2014 Asian Games held in Incheon, South Korea she was eliminated in her first match by Wang Yun of China.

In 2015, Lopez competed in the women's bantamweight event at the World Taekwondo Championships held in Chelyabinsk, Russia where she was eliminated in her second match by Indra Craen of Belgium.

In 2016, Lopez failed to qualify for the 2016 Summer Olympics after losing her match against Phannapa Harnsujin of Thailand at the 2016 Asian Taekwondo Olympic Qualification Tournament held at the Marriot Convention Center Grand Ballroom in Pasay, Metro Manila, Philippines. A few days later, she did win the gold medal in the women's 57 kg event at the 2016 Asian Taekwondo Championships held in the same location.

Lopez won one of the bronze medals in the women's 57 kg event at the 2018 Asian Games held in Jakarta, Indonesia. In 2019, she won the gold medal in the women's 57 kg event at the Southeast Asian Games held in the Philippines, marking a significant comeback from an eight-month losing streak from April to November 2019.

Prior to the COVID-19 pandemic, Lopez had put her college studies on hold for two years to concentrate on her training and competitions. She resumed her studies online during the COVID-19 lockdown. During the COVID-19 pandemic, Lopez adapted her training regimen to online sessions with her coaches, demonstrating her commitment to maintaining her skills and fitness despite the challenging circumstances. She also participated in the Philippine Taekwondo Association's online speed-kicking competition, emerging as the first women's senior champion."

In 2021, Lopez competed at the Asian Olympic Qualification Tournament held in Amman, Jordan hoping to qualify for the 2020 Summer Olympics in Tokyo, Japan. She won her first match and she was then eliminated in her second match by Laetitia Aoun of Lebanon.

== Coaching and advocacy ==
Following her competitive career, Lopez has transitioned into coaching young taekwondo athletes. She focuses on making the sport more inclusive and accessible, particularly for young girls. In 2023, Lopez founded Shero Taekwondo, a martial arts school that offers scholarships to students from underprivileged backgrounds, reflecting her commitment to making the sport accessible to all.

In addition to her work at Shero Taekwondo, Lopez conducts sparring seminars throughout the Philippines. She also actively participates in and organizes taekwondo events, such as the MAPATA Taekwondo Championship, which she hosted at Amoranto Sports Complex in Quezon City in January 2024.
