= Kim Ji-jeong =

South Korean judoka (born 1997)

Personal information
- Born: 4 May 1997 (age 29)
- Occupation: Judoka

Sport
- Country: South Korea
- Sport: Judo
- Weight class: ‍–‍63 kg

Achievements and titles
- World Champ.: R64 (2018, 2023)
- Asian Champ.: (bronze) (2017, 2022, 2023)
Medal record
Women's judo
Representing South Korea
World Championships
Bronze medal – third place	2018 Baku	Mixed team
Asian Games
Bronze medal – third place	2022 Hangzhou	‍–‍63 kg
Asian Championships
Bronze medal – third place	2017 Hong Kong	‍–‍63 kg
Bronze medal – third place	2022 Nur‑Sultan	‍–‍63 kg
Asian Youth Games
Gold medal – first place	2013 Nanjing	‍–‍63 kg

Profile at external databases
- IJF: 34379
- JudoInside.com: 114993
- Updated on 27 September 2023

Kim Ji-jeong (born 4 May 1997) is a South Korean judoka.

Kim won the gold medal in the girls' 63 kg event at the 2013 Asian Youth Games held in Nanjing, China.

Kim participated at the 2018 World Judo Championships, winning a medal.
