= Fariza Aldangorova =

Kazakhstani taekwondo practitioner

Personal information
- Born: 28 June 1996 (age 30)

Sport
- Country: Kazakhstan
- Sport: Taekwondo
Medal record
Women's taekwondo
Representing Kazakhstan
Asian Games
Bronze medal – third place	2018 Jakarta	53 kg
Asian Youth Games
Silver medal – second place	2013 Nanjing	55 kg

Fariza Aldangorova (Фариза Полатқызы Алдангорова, born 28 June 1996) is a Kazakhstani taekwondo practitioner. She won one of the bronze medals in the women's 53 kg event at the 2018 Asian Games held in Jakarta, Indonesia.

In 2013, Aldangorova won the silver medal in the girls' 55 kg event at the Asian Youth Games held in Nanjing, China. In the final, she lost against Pauline Lopez of the Philippines.

In 2014, Aldangorova competed in the women's 53 kg event at the Asian Games held in Incheon, South Korea without advancing far. She was eliminated in her first match by Sousan Hajipour of Iran.
