= Cho Young-wook =

South Korean footballer (born 1999)

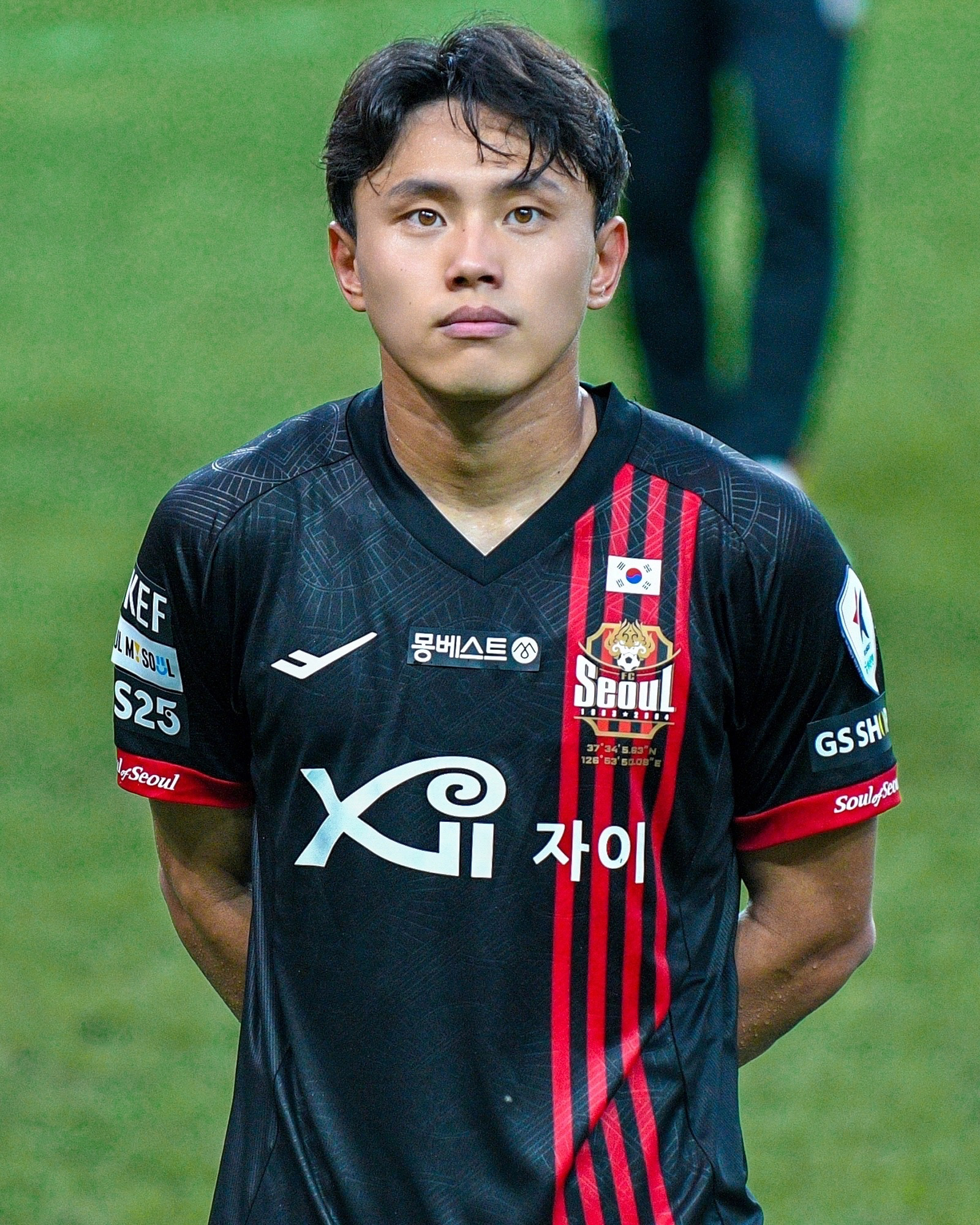
- Cho in 2024

Personal information
- Date of birth: 5 February 1999 (age 27)
- Place of birth: Seoul, South Korea
- Height: 1.81 m (5 ft 11 in)
- Position: Forward

Team information
- Current team: FC Seoul
- Number: 18

Youth career
- 2014–2016: Eonnam High School

College career
Years	Team	Apps	(Gls)
2017	Korea University		

Senior career*
Years	Team	Apps	(Gls)
2018–	FC Seoul	223	(36)
2023	→ Gimcheon Sangmu (draft)	28	(13)

International career
2013	South Korea U14	6	(3)
2016–2019	South Korea U20	46	(21)
2017–2023	South Korea U23	33 (Note: Includes two appearances against another KFA team.)	(14)
2022	South Korea	4	(1)
Medal record
Men's football
Representing South Korea
FIFA U-20 World Cup
Runner-up	2019 Poland	Team
Asian Games
Gold medal – first place	2022 Hangzhou	Team
AFC U-19 Championship
Runner-up	2018 Indonesia	Team
Asian Youth Games
Gold medal – first place	2013 Nanjing	Team
EAFF Championship
Runner-up	2022 Japan	Team
- * Club domestic league appearances and goals as of 3 August 2026

- Korean name
- Hangul: 조영욱
- Hanja: 曺永旭
- RR: Jo Yeonguk
- MR: Cho Yŏnguk
- IPA: /t͡ɕo jʌŋ.uk/

Cho Young-wook (Korean: 조영욱; born 5 February 1999) is a South Korean professional footballer who plays as a forward for K League 1 club FC Seoul.

== Club career ==
Cho joined FC Seoul in January 2018. He made his K League 1 debut against Jeju United on 1 March 2018.

Cho enlisted in military football team Gimcheon Sangmu to perform his mandatory military service in January 2023. While playing for Sangmu, he had 13 goals and 5 assists in 27 K League 2 appearances, and won the league title. He was discharged early from the military service as an Asian Games gold medalist after the 2023 season.

== International career ==
Cho played for South Korea under-20 team in 2017 and 2019 FIFA U-20 World Cup. He appeared in all eleven of South Korea's matches, becoming South Korea's most capped player in the FIFA U-20 World Cup. He helped his team reach the final in the 2019 tournament by scoring two important goals. He scored the winning goal in a 2–1 group victory over Argentina and South Korea's third goal in a 3–3 draw with quarter-final opponents Senegal.

Cho played for South Korean under-24 team in the 2022 Asian Games, scoring four goals in seven matches of the tournament. He earned his 85th youth cap in the Asian Games final against Japan, and won a gold medal after scoring the winning goal.

== Personal life ==
Cho is nicknamed the "Shooting Hamster". It had originally been used to criticise his weak shots, which had been far from the "Shooting Monster", but was changed to positive meaning, with his skills developing.

== Career statistics ==
=== Club ===
As of 29 September 2024

Appearances and goals by club, season and competition
Club	Season	League			Korea Cup		Continental		Other		Total	
Club	Season	Division	Apps	Goals	Apps	Goals	Apps	Goals	Apps	Goals	Apps	Goals
FC Seoul	2018	K League 1	30	3	2	0	—		2 (Note: Appearances in K League promotion-relegation playoffs)	1	34	4
FC Seoul	2019	K League 1	18	2	1	0	—		—		19	2
FC Seoul	2020	K League 1	20	3	2	0	5 (Note: Appearances in AFC Champions League)	0	—		27	3
FC Seoul	2021	K League 1	36	8	1	0	—		—		37	8
FC Seoul	2022	K League 1	37	6	5	2	—		—		42	8
FC Seoul	2024	K League 1	23	3	2	0	—		—		25	3
FC Seoul	Total		164	25	13	2	5	0	2	1	184	28
Gimcheon Sangmu (draft)	2023	K League 2	28	13	0	0	—		—		28	13
Career total			192	38	13	2	5	0	2	1	212	41

=== International ===
Appearances and goals by national team and year
National team	Year	Apps	Goals
South Korea
South Korea	2022	4	1
Total		4	1

Scores and results list South Korea's goal tally first, score column indicates score after each Cho goal.

List of international goals scored by Cho Young-wook
No.	Date	Venue	Opponent	Score	Result	Competition
1	21 January 2022	Mardan Sports Complex, Antalya, Turkey	Moldova	4–0	4–0	Friendly

== Honours ==
Gimcheon Sangmu

- K League 2: 2023

FC Seoul

- K League 1: 2026

South Korea U14

- Asian Youth Games: 2013

South Korea U20

- FIFA U-20 World Cup runner-up: 2019
- AFC U-19 Championship runner-up: 2018

South Korea U23

- Asian Games: 2022

South Korea

- EAFF Championship runner-up: 2022

Individual

- Korean FA Young Player of the Year: 2016
- K League Player of the Month: September 2021
- AFC U-23 Asian Cup top goalscorer: 2022
- K League All-Star: 2022
