= Taekwondo at the 2018 Asian Games – Men's 68 kg =

Taekwondo competition

Men's 68 kg at the 2018 Asian Games
- Venue: Jakarta Convention Center
- Date: 23 August 2018
- Competitors: 22 from 22 nations

Medalists
gold medal	Lee Dae-hoon	South Korea
silver medal	Amir Mohammad Bakhshi	Iran
bronze medal	Yerassyl Kaiyrbek	Kazakhstan
bronze medal	Ahmad Abughaush	Jordan

The men's featherweight (68 kilograms) event at the 2018 Asian Games took place on 23 August 2018 at Jakarta Convention Center Plenary Hall, Jakarta, Indonesia.

== Schedule ==
All times are Western Indonesia Time (UTC+07:00)

Date	Time	Event
Thursday, 23 August 2018	09:00	Round of 32
Thursday, 23 August 2018	09:00	Round of 16
Thursday, 23 August 2018	09:00	Quarterfinals
Thursday, 23 August 2018	15:00	Semifinals
Thursday, 23 August 2018	15:00	Final

== Results ==
=== Final ===
Final
Lee Dae-hoon (KOR)	12
Amir Mohammad Bakhshi (IRI)	10

=== Top half ===
Round of 32
Muhammad Saleh (INA)	22
Arcenio Soares (TLS)	11
Jigme Wangchuk (BHU)	17
Gyanendra Hamal (NEP)	39
Song Guodong (CHN)	18
Nutthawee Klompon (THA)	20

Round of 16
Lee Dae-hoon (KOR)	26
Muhammad Saleh (INA)	5
Arven Alcantara (PHI)	44
Abdulla Al-Ahmed (BRN)	11
Rozaimi Rozali (MAS)	30
Gyanendra Hamal (NEP)	2
Nutthawee Klompon (THA)	10
Yerassyl Kaiyrbek (KAZ)	26

Quarterfinals
Lee Dae-hoon (KOR)	26
Arven Alcantara (PHI)	5
Rozaimi Rozali (MAS)	1
Yerassyl Kaiyrbek (KAZ)	12

Semifinals
Lee Dae-hoon (KOR)	32
Yerassyl Kaiyrbek (KAZ)	10

=== Bottom half ===
Round of 32
Ghazi Al-Asmari (KSA)	18
Sonexay Mangkheua (LAO)	5
Sharif Muradi (AFG)	6
Khojiakbar Zokirov (UZB)	21
Chu Kai Ching (HKG)	2
Lý Hồng Phúc (VIE)	11

Round of 16
Huang Yu-jen (TPE)	22
Ghazi Al-Asmari (KSA)	2
Khojiakbar Zokirov (UZB)	4
Amir Mohammad Bakhshi (IRI)	24
Muhammad Iqbal (PAK)	24
Achitkhüügiin Natsagdorj (MGL)	45
Lý Hồng Phúc (VIE)	16
Ahmad Abughaush (JOR)	27

Quarterfinals
Huang Yu-jen (TPE)	13
Amir Mohammad Bakhshi (IRI)	15
Achitkhüügiin Natsagdorj (MGL)	12
Ahmad Abughaush (JOR)	15

Semifinals
Amir Mohammad Bakhshi (IRI)	10
Ahmad Abughaush (JOR)	8
