= Taekwondo at the 2013 Asian Youth Games =

Taekwondo competition

- Venue: Longjiang Gymnasium
- Dates: 21–22 August 2013

Taekwondo at the 2013 Asian Youth Games was held in Longjiang Gymnasium, Nanjing, China between 21 and 22 August 2013.

== Medalists ==
| Event | Gold | Silver | Bronze |
|---|---|---|---|
| Boys' −53 kg | Ramnarong Sawekwiharee; Thailand | Jin Agojo; Philippines | Iskender Osmonov; Kyrgyzstan |
| Boys' −53 kg | Ramnarong Sawekwiharee; Thailand | Jin Agojo; Philippines | Yerassyl Kaiyrbek; Kazakhstan |
| Boys' −62 kg | Cho Gang-min; South Korea | Abolfazl Yaghoubi; Iran | Anas Al-Orani; Jordan |
| Boys' −62 kg | Cho Gang-min; South Korea | Abolfazl Yaghoubi; Iran | Ganijon Khurilboev; Uzbekistan |
| Girls' −47 kg | Fu Yu; China | Panipak Wongpattanakit; Thailand | Trương Thị Kim Tuyền; Vietnam |
| Girls' −47 kg | Fu Yu; China | Panipak Wongpattanakit; Thailand | Im Min-ji; South Korea |
| Girls' −55 kg | Pauline Lopez; Philippines | Fariza Aldangorova; Kazakhstan | Rania Fawareh; Jordan |
| Girls' −55 kg | Pauline Lopez; Philippines | Fariza Aldangorova; Kazakhstan | Dinorahon Mamadibragimova; Uzbekistan |

== Medal table ==
| Rank | Nation | Gold | Silver | Bronze | Total |
|---|---|---|---|---|---|
| 1 | Philippines (PHI) | 1 | 1 | 0 | 2 |
| 1 | Thailand (THA) | 1 | 1 | 0 | 2 |
| 3 | South Korea (KOR) | 1 | 0 | 1 | 2 |
| 4 | China (CHN) | 1 | 0 | 0 | 1 |
| 5 | Kazakhstan (KAZ) | 0 | 1 | 1 | 2 |
| 6 | Iran (IRI) | 0 | 1 | 0 | 1 |
| 7 | Jordan (JOR) | 0 | 0 | 2 | 2 |
| 7 | Uzbekistan (UZB) | 0 | 0 | 2 | 2 |
| 9 | Kyrgyzstan (KGZ) | 0 | 0 | 1 | 1 |
| 9 | Vietnam (VIE) | 0 | 0 | 1 | 1 |
| Totals (10 entries) | | 4 | 4 | 8 | 16 |

== Results ==
=== Boys' 53 kg ===
21 August

| Quarterfinals | | Semifinals | | Final |
| | | Iskender Osmonov (KGZ) | 6 |
| Ramnarong Sawekwiharee (THA) | 13 | Ramnarong Sawekwiharee (THA) | 19 |
| Liu Dongdong (CHN) | 7 | | | Ramnarong Sawekwiharee (THA) | 11 |
| Trần Ngọc Tuấn (VIE) | 15 | | | Jin Agojo (PHI) | 7 |
| Yerassyl Kaiyrbek (KAZ) | 17 | Yerassyl Kaiyrbek (KAZ) | 8 |
| Navin Ari Krisnasamy (MAS) | 4 | Jin Agojo (PHI) | 9 |
| Jin Agojo (PHI) | 11 |

=== Boys' 62 kg ===
22 August

| Quarterfinals | | Semifinals | | Final |
| Anas Al-Orani (JOR) | 28 |
| Amirul Islam Mehedy (BAN) | 1 | Anas Al-Orani (JOR) | 2 |
| Rene Abou Halka (LIB) | 2 | Abolfazl Yaghoubi (IRI) | 9 |
| Abolfazl Yaghoubi (IRI) | 25 | | | Abolfazl Yaghoubi (IRI) | 4 |
| Cho Gang-min (KOR) | 20 | | | Cho Gang-min (KOR) | 5 |
| Dinggo Ardian Prayogo (INA) | 8 | Cho Gang-min (KOR) | 15 |
| Yeshi Dorji (BHU) | 7 | Ganijon Khurilboev (UZB) | 1 |
| Ganijon Khurilboev (UZB) | 12 |

=== Girls' 47 kg ===
21 August

Quarterfinals
Mahra Al-Karbi (UAE)
Fu Yu (CHN) | WD
Kimia Jahani (IRI) | 5
Panipak Wongpattanakit (THA) | 14
Im Min-ji (KOR) | 1
Aghniny Haque (INA) | 1

Semifinals
Trương Thị Kim Tuyền (VIE) | 4
Fu Yu (CHN) | 10
Panipak Wongpattanakit (THA) | 8
Im Min-ji (KOR) | 7

Final
Fu Yu (CHN) | 3
Panipak Wongpattanakit (THA) | 2

=== Girls' 55 kg ===
22 August

| Quarterfinals | | Semifinals | | Final |
| | | Pauline Lopez (PHI) | 8 |
| Taline Berberi (LIB) | 0 | Rania Fawareh (JOR) | 7 |
| Rania Fawareh (JOR) | 16 | | | Pauline Lopez (PHI) | 4 |
| Chimi Dolma (BHU) | 1 | | | Fariza Aldangorova (KAZ) | 2 |
| Dinorahon Mamadibragimova (UZB) | 20 | Dinorahon Mamadibragimova (UZB) | 0 |
| Fariza Aldangorova (KAZ) | 12 | Fariza Aldangorova (KAZ) | 2 |
| Fatiha Ummul Islam (BAN) | 0 |
