= Cho Gang-min =

South Korean taekwondo practitioner

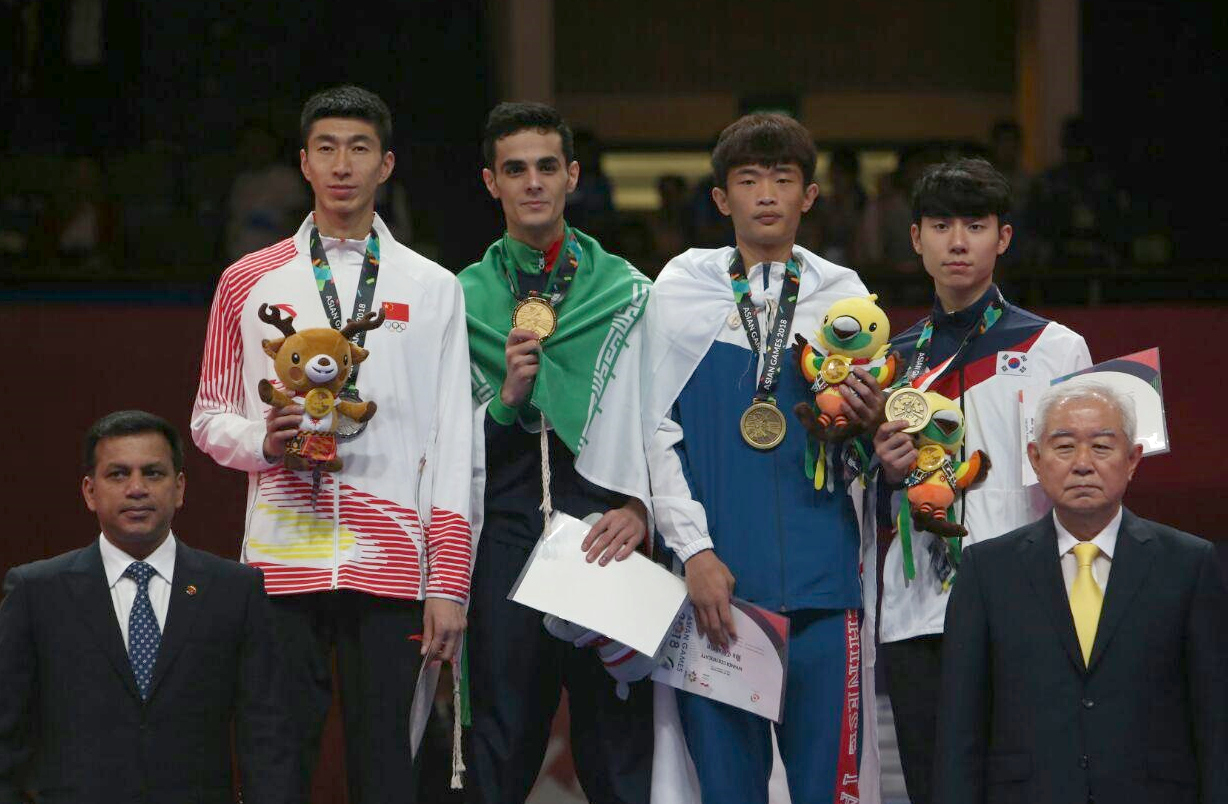
- Cho Gang-min in 2018 (top row, far right)

Personal information
- Born: 4 June 1996 (age 30)

Sport
- Country: South Korea
- Sport: Taekwondo
Medal record
Men's taekwondo
Representing South Korea
Asian Taekwondo Championships
Gold medal – first place	2018 Ho Chi Minh City	63 kg
Bronze medal – third place	2014 Tashkent	58 kg
Asian Games
Bronze medal – third place	2018 Jakarta	63 kg
Asian Youth Games
Gold medal – first place	2013 Nanjing	62 kg

Cho Gang-min (born 4 June 1996) is a South Korean taekwondo practitioner. He won the gold medal in the men's 63 kg event at the 2018 Asian Taekwondo Championships held in Ho Chi Minh City, Vietnam. In the same year, he also won one of the bronze medals in the men's 63 kg event at the 2018 Asian Games held in Jakarta, Indonesia.

In 2013, he won the gold medal in the boys' 62 kg event at the Asian Youth Games held in Nanjing, China. At the 2014 Asian Taekwondo Championships held in Tashkent, Uzbekistan, he won one of the bronze medals in the men's −58 kg event. In 2015, he competed in the men's flyweight event at the 2015 World Taekwondo Championships held in Chelyabinsk, Russia. He was eliminated in his second match by Lucas Guzmán of Argentina.
