= Kim Jung-min (footballer) =

South Korean footballer (born 1999)

Kim Jung-min 김정민
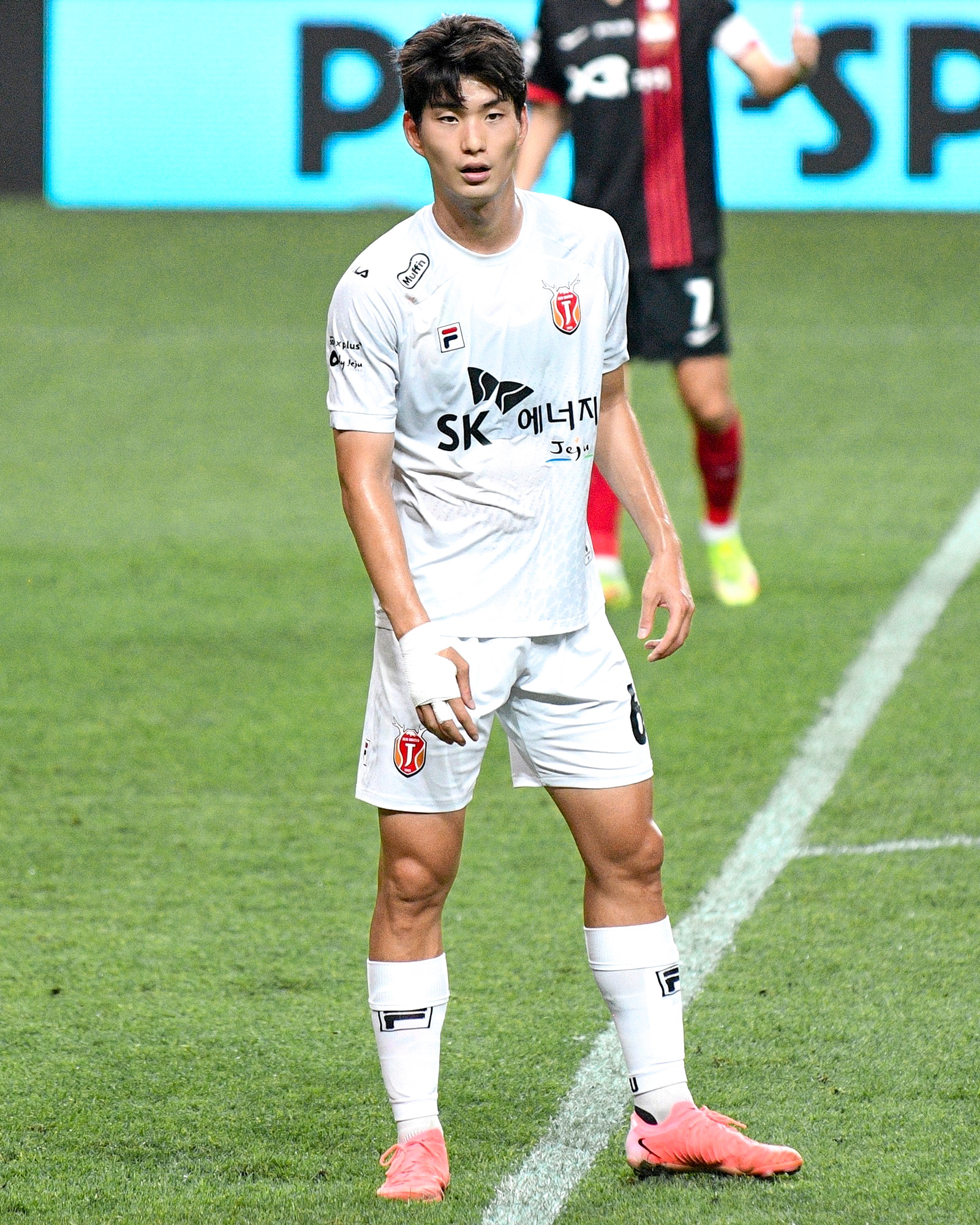
- Kim in 2024

Personal information
- Date of birth: 13 November 1999 (age 27)
- Place of birth: Incheon, South Korea
- Height: 1.84 m (6 ft 0 in)
- Position: Midfielder

Team information
- Current team: Hwaseong FC
- Number: 6

Youth career
- 2015–2017: Gwangju FC

Senior career*
Years	Team	Apps	(Gls)
2018–2020	Red Bull Salzburg	0	(0)
2018–2020	→ FC Liefering (loan)	41	(8)
2020	→ Admira Wacker (loan)	3	(0)
2020	Vitória de Guimarães	0	(0)
2020–2022	Vitória de Guimarães B	8	(0)
2021	→ Gangwon FC (loan)	0	(0)
2021	→ Gangwon FC B (loan)	13	(2)
2021–2022	→ Busan IPark (loan)	32	(1)
2023	FC Anyang	6	(0)
2024–2025	Jeju SK FC	25	(0)
2026–	Hwaseong FC	7	(0)

International career^{‡}
2014–2016	South Korea U17	22	(2)
2016–2019	South Korea U20	19	(1)
2018–2020	South Korea U23	8	(0)
2018–	South Korea	1	(0)
Medal record
Men's football
Representing South Korea
FIFA U-20 World Cup
Runner-up	2019 Poland
Asian Games
Gold medal – first place	2018 Jakarta-Palembang	Team
AFC U-16 Championship
Silver medal – second place	2014 Thailand	Team
- * Club domestic league appearances and goals as of 5 August 2026 ‡ National team caps and goals as of 13 November 2020

- Kim Jung-min
- Hangul: 김정민
- RR: Gim Jeongmin
- MR: Kim Chŏngmin

Kim Jung-min (Korean: 김정민; born 13 November 1999) is a South Korean professional footballer who plays as a midfielder for K League 2 club Hwaseong FC and the South Korea national team.

== Club career ==
On 27 July 2020, Kim joined Primeira Liga side Vitória de Guimarães on a four-year deal from Red Bull Salzburg.

On 10 January 2023, Kim signed with FC Anyang.

== International career ==
Kim won the gold medal with the South Korea national under-23 football team at the 2018 Asian Games.

== Career statistics ==
=== Club ===
As of match played 17 October 2022

Club	Season	League			Cup		Continental		Total	
Club	Season	Division	Apps	Goals	Apps	Goals	Apps	Goals	Apps	Goals
FC Liefering	2017–18	Austrian 2. Liga	13	3	—		–		13	3
FC Liefering	2018–19	Austrian 2. Liga	17	3	—		—		17	3
FC Liefering	2019–20	Austrian 2. Liga	11	2	—		—		11	2
Admira Wacker	2019–20	Austrian Bundesliga	3	0	—		—		3	0
Vitória de Guimarães	2020–21	Primeira Liga	0	0	0	0	—		0	0
Vitória de Guimarães B	2020–21	Campeonato de Portugal	8	0	—		—		8	0
Gangwon FC (loan)	2021	K League 1	0	0	1	0	—		1	0
Gangwon FC B (loan)	2021	K4 League	13	2	0	0	—		13	2
Busan IPark (loan)	2021	K League 2	13	0	0	0	—		13	0
Busan IPark (loan)	2022	K League 2	19	1	2	2	—		21	3
Career total			97	11	3	2	—		100	13

== Honours ==
=== International ===
==== South Korea U20 ====
- FIFA U-20 World Cup runner-up: 2019

==== South Korea U23 ====
- Asian Games: 2018
