= 3x3 basketball at the 2013 Asian Youth Games =

- Venue: Wutaishan Basketball Venue
- Dates: 17–22 August 2013

3x3 basketball at the 2013 Asian Youth Games was contested by 18 teams in the boys' tournament and 9 teams in the girls' tournament. All games were held at Nanjing, Jiangsu, China. The competition was held using the FIBA 33 ruleset developed by the sport's worldwide governing body, FIBA.

== Medalists ==
Event	Gold	Silver	Bronze
Boys	China; Xu Mingzhi; Zuo Zhennian; Shao Yinglun; Hu Jinqiu	Chinese Taipei; Wu Yen-ju; Chen Po-hung; Lee Kuan-yi; Lai Ying-chieh	South Korea; Kim Gook-chan; Byeon Jun-hyeong; Jeon Hyun-woo; Park Jung-hyeon
Girls	China; Chen Caijin; Fu Jing; Guo Zixuan; Huang Zichun	Chinese Taipei; Huang Jou-chen; Lo Pin; Su Yi-ching; Lee I-chian	Thailand; Konrawee Phongkwan; Amphawa Thuamon; Varitta Srijunvong; Kwanchanok Siriphunthanun

== Medal table ==
Rank	Nation	Gold	Silver	Bronze	Total
1	China (CHN)	2	0	0	2
2	Chinese Taipei (TPE)	0	2	0	2
3	South Korea (KOR)	0	0	1	1
3	Thailand (THA)	0	0	1	1
Totals (4 entries)		2	2	2	6

== Results ==
=== Boys ===
==== Preliminary round ====
===== Group A =====
Pos	Team	Pld	W	L	PF	PA	PD	Pts
1	Chinese Taipei	4	4	0	73	48	+25	8
2	Thailand	4	3	1	65	41	+24	7
3	Uzbekistan	4	2	2	59	60	−1	6
4	Palestine	4	1	3	53	66	−13	5
5	Turkmenistan	4	0	4	46	81	−35	4

Source: Official website

17 August
18:00

Palestine	16–18	Uzbekistan
Pts: Etayem, Aburumman 5		Pts: Askarov 8

Wutaishan Basketball Venue, Nanjing
Referees: Yang Xiaoguang (CHN)

17 August
18:30

Thailand	10–17	Chinese Taipei
Pts: Menkul 4		Pts: Lee 8

Wutaishan Basketball Venue, Nanjing
Referees: Dwi Cahyo Kartiko (INA)

17 August
20:00

Turkmenistan	12–21	Palestine
Pts: Ah. Çaryýew 6		Pts: Atallah 8

Wutaishan Basketball Venue, Nanjing
Referees: Dwi Cahyo Kartiko (INA)

18 August
18:00

Chinese Taipei	21–15	Uzbekistan
Pts: Lee 13		Pts: Askarov 8

Wutaishan Basketball Venue, Nanjing
Referees: Dwi Cahyo Kartiko (INA)

18 August
19:30

Turkmenistan	13–20	Chinese Taipei
Pts: Nuryýew, Ah. Çaryýew 6		Pts: Chen 11

Wutaishan Basketball Venue, Nanjing
Referees: Chan Wai Seong (MAS)

18 August
20:00

Palestine	6–21	Thailand
Pts: Atallah, Etayem, Aburumman 2		Pts: Chungyampin 14

Wutaishan Basketball Venue, Nanjing
Referees: Leong Chuen Wing (SIN)

19 August
18:00

Palestine	10–15	Chinese Taipei
Pts: Etayem 7		Pts: Wu, Lee 5

Wutaishan Basketball Venue, Nanjing
Referees: Dwi Cahyo Kartiko (INA)

19 August
18:30

Uzbekistan	19–10	Turkmenistan
Pts: Khayitaliev 8		Pts: Ah. Çaryýew 6

Wutaishan Basketball Venue, Nanjing
Referees: Chan Wai Seong (MAS)

19 August
19:30

Turkmenistan	11–21	Thailand
Pts: Nuryýew 10		Pts: Chokamnuai 9

Wutaishan Basketball Venue, Nanjing
Referees: Dwi Cahyo Kartiko (INA)

19 August
20:00

Thailand	13–7	Uzbekistan
Pts: Chungyampin 7		Pts: Askarov 3

Wutaishan Basketball Venue, Nanjing
Referees: Yang Xiaoguang (CHN)

===== Group B =====
Pos	Team	Pld	W	L	PF	PA	PD	Pts
1	South Korea	4	4	0	80	50	+30	8
2	Iran	4	3	1	65	53	+12	7
3	Macau	4	2	2	55	49	+6	6
4	Bangladesh	4	1	3	60	64	−4	5
5	Iraq	4	0	4	36	80	−44	4

Source: Official website

17 August
18:00

Bangladesh	11–13	Macau
Pts: Quader 5		Pts: Chan, Fong 5

Wutaishan Basketball Venue, Nanjing
Referees: Glenn Cornelio (PHI)

17 August
19:30

Iraq	7–22	South Korea
Pts: Othman 5		Pts: Jeon 12

Wutaishan Basketball Venue, Nanjing
Referees: Glenn Cornelio (PHI)

17 August
20:30

South Korea	17–15	Iran
Pts: Park 7		Pts: Farhadi 9

Wutaishan Basketball Venue, Nanjing
Referees: Chan Wai Seong (MAS)

18 August
18:00

Iran	21–10	Iraq
Pts: Toudeh 8		Pts: Abu-Taleb 6

Wutaishan Basketball Venue, Nanjing
Referees: Yang Xiaoguang (CHN)

18 August
19:30

Iraq	6–19	Macau
Pts: Othman 4		Pts: Chan 8

Wutaishan Basketball Venue, Nanjing
Referees: Glenn Cornelio (PHI)

18 August
20:00

Bangladesh	15–17	Iran
Pts: Hossain, Istiaque, Chowdhury 4		Pts: Nassiri 10

Wutaishan Basketball Venue, Nanjing
Referees: Lu Tao (CHN)

18 August
20:30

Macau	12–20	South Korea
Pts: Fong 7		Pts: Kim 9

Wutaishan Basketball Venue, Nanjing
Referees: Dwi Cahyo Kartiko (INA)

19 August
18:00

Bangladesh	18–13	Iraq
Pts: Quader 8		Pts: Othman 9

Wutaishan Basketball Venue, Nanjing
Referees: Chan Wai Seong (MAS)

19 August
19:30

Macau	11–12	Iran
Pts: Chan 8		Pts: Nassiri 5

Wutaishan Basketball Venue, Nanjing
Referees: Zanim Mohamed Hashim (INA)

19 August
21:00

South Korea	21–16	Bangladesh
Pts: Jeon 8		Pts: Quader 9

Wutaishan Basketball Venue, Nanjing
Referees: Leong Chuen Wing (SIN)

===== Group C =====
Pos	Team	Pld	W	L	PF	PA	PD	Pts
1	Philippines	3	3	0	45	28	+17	6
2	Indonesia	3	2	1	41	25	+16	5
3	Saudi Arabia	3	1	2	37	31	+6	4
4	Maldives	3	0	3	20	59	−39	3

Source: Official website

17 August
18:30

Indonesia	8–10	Philippines
Pts: Pangesthio 4		Pts: Go 5

Wutaishan Basketball Venue, Nanjing
Referees: Ahmed Al-Suwaili (IRQ)

17 August
19:30

Saudi Arabia	17–5	Maldives
Pts: Musallam, Al-Hathaf 7		Pts: Rasheed, Liyau 2

Wutaishan Basketball Venue, Nanjing
Referees: Chan Wai Seong (MAS)

17 August
21:00

Philippines	14–10	Saudi Arabia
Pts: Go, Caracut 6		Pts: Musallam 5

Wutaishan Basketball Venue, Nanjing
Referees: Yang Xiaoguang (CHN)

18 August
18:30

Maldives	5–21	Indonesia
Pts: Abdulla 3		Pts: Kosasih 9

Wutaishan Basketball Venue, Nanjing
Referees: Zanim Mohamed Hashim (INA)

18 August
21:00

Maldives	10–21	Philippines
Pts: Hashim 6		Pts: Go 12

Wutaishan Basketball Venue, Nanjing
Referees: Yuan Ningpeng (CHN)

19 August
18:30

Saudi Arabia	10–12	Indonesia
Pts: Musallam 6		Pts: Pangesthio 6

Wutaishan Basketball Venue, Nanjing
Referees: Lu Tao (CHN)

===== Group D =====
Pos	Team	Pld	W	L	PF	PA	PD	Pts
1	China	3	3	0	56	18	+38	6
2	Malaysia	3	2	1	47	33	+14	5
3	Mongolia	3	1	2	23	50	−27	4
4	Jordan	3	0	3	23	48	−25	3

Source: Official website

17 August
20:00

Jordan	8–10	Mongolia
Pts: Hijazi 4		Pts: Ünenbat 6

Wutaishan Basketball Venue, Nanjing
Referees: Leong Chuen Wing (SIN)

17 August
21:00

China	15–8	Malaysia
Pts: Xu 6		Pts: Wong Y. 5

Wutaishan Basketball Venue, Nanjing
Referees: Leong Chuen Wing (SIN)

18 August
18:30

Mongolia	9–21	Malaysia
Pts: Tuguldur 4		Pts: Wong Y. 8

Wutaishan Basketball Venue, Nanjing
Referees: Ahmed Al-Suwaili (IRQ)

18 August
21:00

China	20–6	Jordan
Pts: Xu 7		Pts: Al-Abed 3

Wutaishan Basketball Venue, Nanjing
Referees: Chan Wai Seong (MAS)

19 August
17:30

Malaysia	18–9	Jordan
Pts: J. Wong 9		Pts: Hijazi, Al-Abed 3

Wutaishan Basketball Venue, Nanjing
Referees: Leong Chuen Wing (SIN)

19 August
21:00

China	21–4	Mongolia
Pts: Xu, Shao, Hu 6		Pts: Ünenbat, Tuguldur 2

Wutaishan Basketball Venue, Nanjing
Referees: Ahmed Al-Suwaili (IRQ)

==== Final round ====
Quarterfinals
21 August
Chinese Taipei	21
Malaysia	19
21 August
Philippines	14
Iran	16
21 August
Thailand	9
China	21
21 August
Indonesia	5
South Korea	21

Semifinals
21 August
Chinese Taipei	13
Iran	11
21 August
China	13
South Korea	11

Gold medal game
22 August
Chinese Taipei	14
China	21
Bronze medal game
22 August
Iran	16
South Korea	18

Classification (5–8)
21 August
Malaysia	21
Philippines	18
21 August
Thailand	10
Indonesia	9

Classification 5th–6th
22 August
Malaysia	12
Thailand	16
Classification 7th–8th
22 August
Philippines	11
Indonesia	19

===== Quarterfinals =====
21 August
17:30

Chinese Taipei	21–19	Malaysia
Pts: Chen 9		Pts: Wong Y. 12

Wutaishan Basketball Venue, Nanjing
Referees: Dwi Cahyo Kartiko (INA)

21 August
17:30

Philippines	14–16	Iran
Pts: Caracut 7		Pts: Sheikhi, Farhadi 7

Wutaishan Basketball Venue, Nanjing
Referees: Yang Xiaoguang (CHN)

21 August
18:00

Thailand	9–21	China
Pts: Menkul, Chokamnuai 3		Pts: Hu 10

Wutaishan Basketball Venue, Nanjing
Referees: Chan Wai Seong (MAS)

21 August
18:00

Indonesia	5–21	South Korea
Pts: Aziz 4		Pts: Jeon 7

Wutaishan Basketball Venue, Nanjing
Referees: Ahmed Al-Suwaili (IRQ)

===== Classification (5–8) =====
21 August
20:00

Malaysia	21–18	Philippines
Pts: Wong Y. 8		Pts: Caracut 10

Wutaishan Basketball Venue, Nanjing
Referees: Watcharin Padungratchadakit (THA)

21 August
20:00

Thailand	10–9	Indonesia
Pts: Chungyampin 8		Pts: Pangesthio 7

Wutaishan Basketball Venue, Nanjing
Referees: Lu Tao (CHN)

===== Semifinals =====
21 August
20:30

Chinese Taipei	13–11	Iran
Pts: Lee 6		Pts: Nassiri 4

Wutaishan Basketball Venue, Nanjing
Referees: Glenn Cornelio (PHI)

21 August
21:00

China	13–11	South Korea
Pts: Shao 5		Pts: Kim 5

Wutaishan Basketball Venue, Nanjing
Referees: Ahmed Al-Suwaili (IRQ)

===== Classification 7th–8th =====
22 August
19:00

Philippines	11–19	Indonesia
Pts: Caracut 5		Pts: Aziz 10

Wutaishan Basketball Venue, Nanjing
Referees: Zanim Mohamed Hashim (INA)

===== Classification 5th–6th =====
22 August
20:30

Malaysia	12–16	Thailand
Pts: Wong Y. 7		Pts: Menkul 8

Wutaishan Basketball Venue, Nanjing
Referees: Shi Jing (CHN)

===== Bronze medal game =====
22 August
19:00

Iran	16–18	South Korea
Pts: Sheikhi 9		Pts: Jeon 9

Wutaishan Basketball Venue, Nanjing
Referees: Yang Xiaoguang (CHN)

===== Gold medal game =====
22 August
20:30

Chinese Taipei	14–21	China
Pts: Lee 10		Pts: Zuo 10

Wutaishan Basketball Venue, Nanjing
Referees: Leong Chuen Wing (SIN)

=== Girls ===
==== Preliminary round ====
===== Group A =====
Pos	Team	Pld	W	L	PF	PA	PD	Pts
1	Chinese Taipei	4	4	0	78	17	+61	8
2	Thailand	4	3	1	66	23	+43	7
3	Jordan	4	2	2	50	43	+7	6
4	Kuwait	4	1	3	19	68	−49	5
5	Iraq	4	0	4	10	72	−62	4

Source: Official website

17 August
17:30

Chinese Taipei	21–0	Iraq
Pts: Lo 9		Pts: 0

Wutaishan Basketball Venue, Nanjing
Referees: Lu Tao (CHN)

17 August
17:30

Jordan	4–14	Thailand
Pts: Abu Jbara 2		Pts: Srijunvong 6

Wutaishan Basketball Venue, Nanjing
Referees: Premila Beruwalage (SRI)

17 August
19:00

Kuwait	4–21	Thailand
Pts: Ali 4		Pts: Thuamon, Siriphunthanun 7

Wutaishan Basketball Venue, Nanjing
Referees: Premila Beruwalage (SRI)

18 August
17:30

Chinese Taipei	21–1	Kuwait
Pts: Lo 7		Pts: Ali 1

Wutaishan Basketball Venue, Nanjing
Referees: Ikuko Kozakai (JPN)

18 August
17:30

Jordan	21–3	Iraq
Pts: Sirriyeh 10		Pts: Salih 2

Wutaishan Basketball Venue, Nanjing
Referees: Shi Jing (CHN)

18 August
19:00

Thailand	21–0	Iraq
Pts: Phongkwan 7		Pts: 0

Wutaishan Basketball Venue, Nanjing
Referees: Premila Beruwalage (SRI)

19 August
17:30

Chinese Taipei	15–10	Thailand
Pts: Lo 7		Pts: Thuamon 5

Wutaishan Basketball Venue, Nanjing
Referees: Glenn Cornelio (PHI)

19 August
19:00

Kuwait	5–19	Jordan
Pts: Ali, Karam 2		Pts: Sirriyeh 8

Wutaishan Basketball Venue, Nanjing
Referees: Lu Tao (CHN)

19 August
20:00

Jordan	6–21	Chinese Taipei
Pts: Abu Jbara, Sirriyeh, Khuzouz 2		Pts: Lee 7

Wutaishan Basketball Venue, Nanjing
Referees: Premila Beruwalage (SRI)

19 August
20:30

Iraq	7–9	Kuwait
Pts: Kamel 3		Pts: Karam 5

Wutaishan Basketball Venue, Nanjing
Referees: Ahmed Al-Suwaili (IRQ)

===== Group B =====
Pos	Team	Pld	W	L	PF	PA	PD	Pts
1	China	3	3	0	60	13	+47	6
2	Uzbekistan	3	2	1	42	25	+17	5
3	Indonesia	3	1	2	32	42	−10	4
4	Palestine	3	0	3	9	63	−54	3

Source: Official website

17 August
19:00

Palestine	2–21	Uzbekistan
Pts: Handal, Zablah 1		Pts: Kirienko 11

Wutaishan Basketball Venue, Nanjing
Referees: Watcharin Padungratchadakit (THA)

17 August
20:30

China	20–7	Indonesia
Pts: Guo 7		Pts: Elvira 3

Wutaishan Basketball Venue, Nanjing
Referees: Ikuko Kozakai (JPN)

18 August
19:00

Uzbekistan	16–4	Indonesia
Pts: Asanova 6		Pts: Elvira, Rushadi 2

Wutaishan Basketball Venue, Nanjing
Referees: Ikuko Kozakai (JPN)

18 August
20:30

China	21–1	Palestine
Pts: Guo, Huang 6		Pts: Zablah 1

Wutaishan Basketball Venue, Nanjing
Referees: Ikuko Kozakai (JPN)

19 August
19:00

Palestine	6–21	Indonesia
Pts: Handal 3		Pts: Nabila 11

Wutaishan Basketball Venue, Nanjing
Referees: Ikuko Kozakai (JPN)

19 August
20:30

China	19–5	Uzbekistan
Pts: Guo 11		Pts: Asanova 3

Wutaishan Basketball Venue, Nanjing
Referees: Watcharin Padungratchadakit (THA)

==== Classification (5–8) ====
===== Classification 7th–8th =====
22 August
18:30

Kuwait	21–0	Palestine
Walkover

Wutaishan Basketball Venue, Nanjing
Referees: Yuan Ningpeng (CHN)

===== Classification 5th–6th =====
22 August
20:00

Jordan	15–19	Indonesia
Pts: Abu Jbara 7		Pts: Rushadi 8

Wutaishan Basketball Venue, Nanjing
Referees: Watcharin Padungratchadakit (THA)

==== Final round ====
Semifinals
21 August
Chinese Taipei	20
Uzbekistan	6
21 August
China	15
Thailand	13

Gold medal game
22 August
Chinese Taipei	10
China	16
Bronze medal game
22 August
Uzbekistan	4
Thailand	16

===== Semifinals =====
21 August
19:00

Chinese Taipei	20–6	Uzbekistan
Pts: Huang 10		Pts: Komarova 3

Wutaishan Basketball Venue, Nanjing
Referees: Zanim Mohamed Hashim (INA)

21 August
19:30

China	15–13	Thailand
Pts: Guo 6		Pts: Srijunvong 6

Wutaishan Basketball Venue, Nanjing
Referees: Leong Chuen Wing (SIN)

===== Bronze medal game =====
22 August
18:30

Uzbekistan	4–16	Thailand
Pts: Kirienko 3		Pts: Thuamon, Siriphunthanun 5

Wutaishan Basketball Venue, Nanjing
Referees: Chan Wai Seong (MAS)

===== Gold medal game =====
22 August
20:00

Chinese Taipei	10–16	China
Pts: Huang 7		Pts: Guo, Huang 6

Wutaishan Basketball Venue, Nanjing
Referees: Ikuko Kozakai (JPN)
