= Abolfazl Yaghoubi =

Iranian taekwondo practitioner

Personal information
- Nationality: Iranian
- Born: 27 December 1996 (age 29)
- Height: 180 cm (5 ft 11 in)
- Weight: 68 kg (150 lb)

Sport
- Sport: Taekwondo
Medal record
Representing Iran
Men's taekwondo
World Championships
Bronze medal – third place	2015 Chelyabinsk	63 kg
Grand Prix
Silver medal – second place	2015 Manchester	68 kg
Bronze medal – third place	2015 Moscow	68 kg
Bronze medal – third place	2015 Samsun	68 kg
Bronze medal – third place	2018 Moscow	68 kg
Asian Championships
Silver medal – second place	2016 Manila	63 kg
Military World Games
Gold medal – first place	2015 Mungyeong	63 kg
Asian Youth Games
Silver medal – second place	2013 Nanjing	62 kg
World Junior Championships
Gold medal – first place	2012 Sharm El Sheikh	58 kg

Abolfazl Yaghoubi Jouybari (born 27 December 1996) is an Iranian Taekwondo athlete. He won a bronze medal at the 2015 World Taekwondo Championships on the under 63 kg weight category.
