= Omid Seydali =

Iranian footballer

Personal information
- Date of birth: 7 May 1999 (age 27)
- Place of birth: Behbahan, Iran
- Height: 1.80 m (5 ft 11 in)
- Position: Midfielder

Team information
- Current team: Pars Jonoubi Jam
- Number: 66

Youth career
- –2018: Foolad

Senior career*
Years	Team	Apps	(Gls)
2018–2022	Foolad	4	(0)
2022	Shahrdari Astara	13	(1)
2022–2023	Khalij Fars	16	(0)
2023–2024	Esteghlal Mollasani	19	(1)
2024–	Pars Jonoubi Jam	11	(0)
- * Club domestic league appearances and goals as of 21 April 2025

Omid Seydali (Persian: امید صیدالی; born 7 May 1999) is an Iranian footballer who plays as a midfielder for Pars Jonoubi Jam in the Azadegan League.

== Club career ==
=== Foolad ===
He made his debut for Foolad in 9th fixtures of 2018–19 Iran Pro League against Padideh.

== Honours ==
Foolad

- Hazfi Cup: 2020–21
- Iranian Super Cup: 2021
