= Fatemeh Jamalifar =

Iranian table tennis player

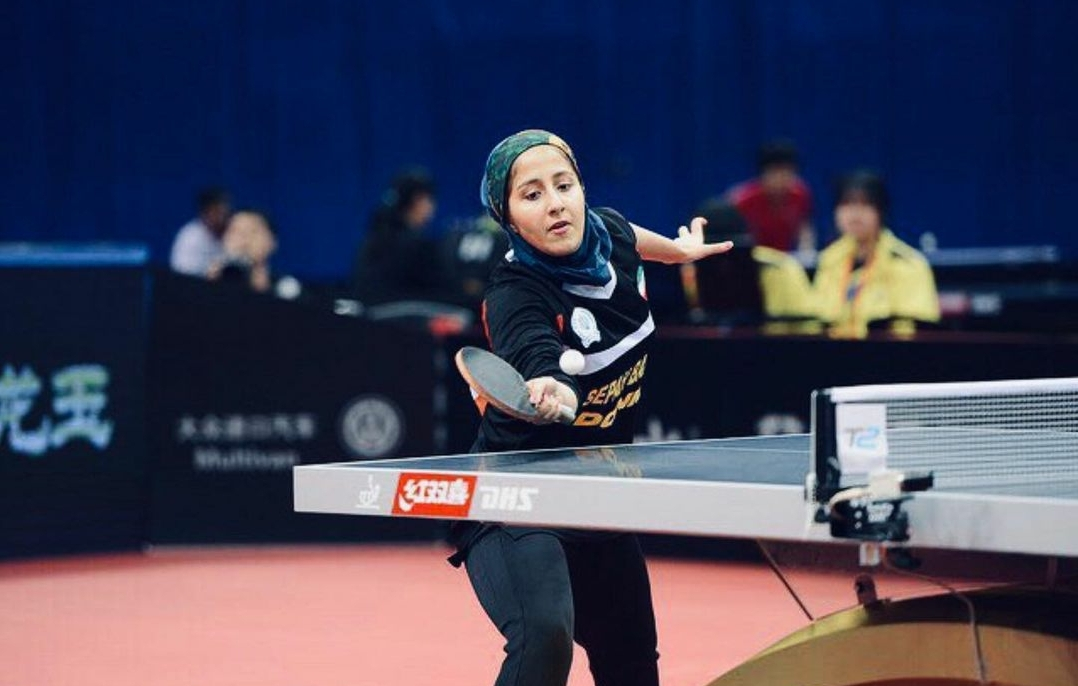
- Jamalifar in September 2019

Personal information
- Full name: Fatemeh jamalifar
- Nationality: Iran
- Born: 3 April 1999 (age 27) Karaj, Iran
- Height: 1.63 m (5 ft 4 in)
- Weight: 56 kg (123 lb)

Sport
- Sport: Table tennis
- Club: Iranian Academy
- Playing style: attacks، Right-handed
- Equipment: Brand Butterfly & Victas
- Highest ranking: 504
- Current ranking: 664
Medal record
Representing Iran
Portugal Youth World Open 2019
Silver medal – second place	Single and doubles runner-up	Women's table tennis

Fatemeh Jamalifar (in Persian: فاطمه جمالی‌فر) (Born April 3, 1999, in Karaj) is a table tennis player and a member of the Iranian national team. She started her career in 2008 and achieved many successes. She entered the national arena in 2009 by joining the national non-halal team. The national table tennis team of Iran has been present. Jamalifar will be a member of Babak Kerman Municipality team in 2020 _ 2021 in the Adult Premier League.

== Honors ==
- is an Iranian table tennis player. She ranked 1 in Iran in October 2016.
- In Asian championship cup she lost to Liu Shiwen
- She is the youngest champ in Iran though to become champ in October 2016.
- Member of the national adult team in the Asian Games 2016 Thailand
- Member of the national adult team in the Asian Games in China 2017
- Member of the Adult National Team in the Asian Games in Indonesia 2018
