= Deng Weiyun =

Chinese sport shooter

Personal information
- Nationality: Chinese
- Born: 11 March 1996 (age 30) Shanghai, China

Sport
- Sport: Shooting
Medal record
Women's shooting
Representing China
Asian Championships
Gold medal – first place	2015 Kuwait City	Trap team
Gold medal – first place	2018 Kuwait City	Trap team
Silver medal – second place	2019 Doha	Trap team

Deng Weiyun is a Chinese sport shooter. She represents China at the 2020 Summer Olympics in Tokyo.
