= Amir Mehdi Janmaleki =

Iranian footballer (born 1999)

Personal information
- Date of birth: 1 February 1999 (age 27)
- Place of birth: Tehran, Iran
- Height: 1.85 m (6 ft 1 in)
- Position: Centre-back

Team information
- Current team: Mes Rafsanjan
- Number: 4

Youth career
- 2013–2015: Esteghlal
- 2015–2016: Paykan
- 2016–2017: Moghavemat Tehran

Senior career*
Years	Team	Apps	(Gls)
2017–2019	Tractor	1	(0)
2018–2019	→ Malavan (loan)	18	(0)
2019–2020	Saipa	1	(0)
2020–2025	Nassaji	87	(6)
2025–	Mes Rafsanjan	4	(0)

International career^{‡}
2017	Iran U19	2	(1)
2018–2021	Iran U23	1	(0)
- * Club domestic league appearances and goals as of 16 April 2025 ‡ National team caps and goals as of 8 June 2023

Amir Mehdi Janmaleki (Persian: امیرمهدی جان ملکی; born 1 February 1999) is an Iranian professional football player who plays as defender for the Persian Gulf Pro League club Mes Rafsanjan. His grandfather, Ezzat, played for Taj and the Iran national team.

== Career statistics ==
=== Club ===
Club	Season	League			Cup		Continental		Other		Total	
Club	Season	League	Apps	Goals	Apps	Goals	Apps	Goals	Apps	Goals	Apps	Goals
Tractor	2017-18	Persian Gulf Pro League	1	0	0	0	0	0	0	0	1	0
Malavan	2018-19	Azadegan League	18	0	1	0	0	0	0	0	19	0
Saipa	2019-20	Persian Gulf Pro League	1	0	0	0	0	0	0	0	1	0
Nassaji	2020-21	Persian Gulf Pro League	9	2	0	0	0	0	0	0	9	2
Nassaji	2021-22	Persian Gulf Pro League	26	2	5	0	0	0	0	0	31	2
Nassaji	2022-23	Persian Gulf Pro League	21	1	2	0	0	0	1	0	24	1
Nassaji	2023-24	Persian Gulf Pro League	22	1	0	0	5	0	0	0	27	1
Nassaji	Total		78	6	7	0	5	0	1	0	91	6
Career Total			98	6	8	0	5	0	1	0	112	6
