= Mohammad Soltani Mehr =

Iranian footballer

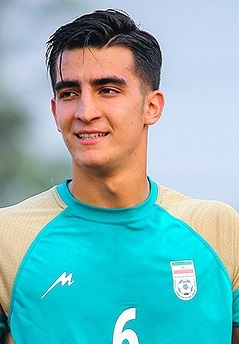

Personal information
- Date of birth: 4 February 1999 (age 27)
- Place of birth: Tehran, Iran
- Height: 1.82 m (5 ft 11 1/2 in)
- Position: Central midfielder

Team information
- Current team: Esteghlal Khuzestan
- Number: 5

Youth career
- 2006–2010: Pas Tehran
- 2010–2012: Damash Tehran
- 2012–2015: Saipa

Senior career*
Years	Team	Apps	(Gls)
2015–2020	Saipa	20	(0)
2020	Shahin Bushehr	8	(0)
2020–2023	Zob Ahan	51	(0)
2023–2024	Esteghlal Khuzestan	8	(0)
2024–2025	Pars Jonoubi	31	(4)
2025–2026	Nassaji Mazandaran	17	(2)
2026–	Esteghlal Khuzestan	4	(0)

International career^{‡}
2014–2016	Iran U17	24	(7)
2016–2017	Iran U20	18	(4)
2018–2021	Iran U23	7	(0)
- * Club domestic league appearances and goals as of 7 December 2025 ‡ National team caps and goals as of 31 October 2021

Mohammad Soltani Mehr (Persian: محمد سلطانی‌ مهر, born 4 February 1999) is an Iranian professional football player who plays for Esteghlal Khuzestan in the Persian Gulf Pro League. He has been mentioned by The Guardian among 60 of the best young talents in world football.

== Club career ==
=== Saipa ===
He started his career with Pas Tehran academy. Later he joined Damash Tehran and Saipa academies. In summer 2015 he was promoted to Saipa first team by Majid Jalali. He made his debut for Saipa on 12 February 2016 against Sepahan as a substitute for Milad Meydavoudi, being only 17 years and 8 days old.

== Club career statistics ==
As of 30 May 2022.

Club	Division	Season	League		Hazfi Cup		Asia		Total	
Club	Division	Season	Apps	Goals	Apps	Goals	Apps	Goals	Apps	Goals
Saipa	Pro League	2015–16	7	0	0	0	–	–	7	0
Saipa	Pro League	2016–17	3	0	1	0	–	–	4	0
Saipa	Pro League	2017–18	4	0	0	0	–	–	4	0
Saipa	Pro League	2018–19	6	0	1	0	2	0	9	0
Saipa	Pro League	2019–20	0	0	0	0	–	–	0	0
Shahin Bushehr	Pro League	2019–20	8	0	0	0	–	–	8	0
Zob Ahan	Pro League	2020–21	19	0	2	0	–	–	21	0
Zob Ahan	Pro League	2021–22	8	0	2	0	–	–	10	0
Career totals			55	0	6	0	2	0	63	0

== International career ==
=== U17 ===
He was part of Iran U–17 in 2014 AFC U-16 Championship.

=== U20 ===
In 2016 he played in the AFC U-19 Championship held in Bahrain. Furthermore, he was invited to the Iran U–20 squad for the 2017 FIFA U-20 World Cup held in South Corea from 20 May until 11 June 2017. He played in all 3 matches of the group stage against Costa Rica, Zambia, and Portugal.
