= Tsai Ming-yen (judoka) =

Taiwanese judoka

Personal information
- Nationality: Taiwanese
- Born: 7 January 1996 (age 30)
- Occupation: Judoka

Sport
- Country: Taiwan
- Sport: Judo
- Weight class: –60 kg, –66 kg

Achievements and titles
- Olympic Games: R32 (2016)
- World Champ.: R16 (2014)
- Asian Champ.: (bronze) (2012, 2013)
Medal record
Men's judo
Representing Chinese Taipei
Asian Championships
Bronze medal – third place	2012 Tashkent	–60 kg
Bronze medal – third place	2013 Bangkok	–60 kg
IJF Grand Slam
Bronze medal – third place	2014 Paris	–60 kg
IJF Grand Prix
Silver medal – second place	2013 Jeju	–60 kg
Bronze medal – third place	2019 Hohhot	–66 kg
World Cadets Championships
Silver medal – second place	2011 Kyiv	–55 kg
Asian Youth Games
Bronze medal – third place	2013 Nanjing	–66 kg
Asian Cadet Championships
Gold medal – first place	2010 Bangkok	–55 kg
Gold medal – first place	2011 Beirut	–55 kg
Bronze medal – third place	2012 Taipei	–60 kg

Profile at external databases
- IJF: 7547
- JudoInside.com: 79525
- Updated on 27 November 2022

Tsai Ming-yen (born 7 January 1996) is a Taiwanese judoka. He competed at the 2016 Summer Olympics in the men's 60 kg event, in which he was eliminated in the second round by Yanislav Gerchev.
