= List of flag bearers for Oman at the Olympics =

Oman at the Olympics
- IOC code: OMA
- NOC: Oman Olympic Committee
- Website: ooc.om
- Medals: Gold 0 Silver 0 Bronze 0 Total 0

Summer appearances
- 1984; 1988; 1992; 1996; 2000; 2004; 2008; 2012; 2016; 2020; 2024

This is a list of flag bearers who have represented Oman at the Olympics.

Flag bearers carry the national flag of their country at the opening ceremony of the Olympic Games.

| # | Event year | Season | Flag bearer | Sport |
|---|---|---|---|---|
| 1 | 1984 | Summer | Mohamed Al-Busaidi | Official |
| 2 | 1988 | Summer | Abdul Latif Al-Bulushi | Shooting |
| 3 | 1992 | Summer | | |
| 4 | 1996 | Summer | Khalifa Al-Khatry | Shooting |
| 5 | 2000 | Summer | Mohamed Al-Malky | Athletics |
| 6 | 2004 | Summer | Hamoud Abdallah Al-Dalhami | Athletics |
| 7 | 2008 | Summer | Dadallah Al-Bulushi | Shooting |
| 8 | 2012 | Summer | Ahmed Al-Hatmi | Shooting |
| 9 | 2016 | Summer | Hamed Said Al-Khatri | Shooting |
| 10 | 2020 | Summer | Issa Al-Adawi | Swimming |
| 11 | 2024 | Summer | Mazoon Al-Alawi | Athletics |
| 11 | 2024 | Summer | Ali Anwar Al-Balushi | Athletics |

== See also ==
- Oman at the Olympics
