= Oman at the 2020 Summer Paralympics =

- IPC code: OMA
- NPC: Oman Paralympic Committee

in Tokyo
- Competitors: 3 in 1 sport
- Flag bearer: Mohammed Al Mashaykhi
- Medals: Gold 0 Silver 0 Bronze 1 Total 1

Summer Paralympics appearances (overview)
- 1988; 1992; 1996; 2000; 2004; 2008; 2012; 2016; 2020; 2024

Oman sent a delegation to compete in the 2020 Summer Paralympics in Tokyo in Japan originally scheduled to take place in 2020 but postponed to 23 July to 8 August 2021 because of the COVID-19 pandemic. This was the country's ninth successive appearance in the Summer Paralympics since debuting at the 1988 Summer Paralympics.

== Medalists ==
| Medal | Name | Sport | Event | Date |
|---|---|---|---|---|
| Bronze | Mohammed Al Mashaykhi | Athletics | Men's shot put F32 | 31 August |

== Competitors ==
| Sport | Men | Women | Total |
|---|---|---|---|
| Athletics | 2 | 1 | 2 |
| Total | 2 | 1 | 3 |

== Athletics ==
Men's field

| Athlete | Event | Final | |
| Athlete | Event | Result | Rank |
|---|---|---|---|
| Mohammed Al Mashaykhi | Men's club throw F32 | 30.59 SB | 9 |
| Mohammed Al Mashaykhi | Men's shot put F32 | 10.84 PB | Bronze |
| Taha Al Harrasi | Men's long jump T36 | 4.24 | 9 |

Women's field

| Athlete | Event | Final | |
| Athlete | Event | Result | Rank |
|---|---|---|---|
| Iman Taiseer | Women's shot put F34 | 5.17 | 11 |

== See also ==
- Oman at the 2020 Summer Olympics
