= Swimming at the 2013 Asian Youth Games =

- Venue: OSC Natatorium
- Dates: 19–23 August 2013

Swimming at the 2013 Asian Youth Games was held in the Nanjing Olympic Sports Center Natatorium from 19 August to 23 August 2013 in Nanjing, China.

== Medalists ==
=== Boys ===
Event	Gold		Silver		Bronze	
50 m freestyle	Darren Lim; Singapore	23.09	Lim Ching Hwang; Malaysia	23.46	Kim Da-san; South Korea	23.47
100 m freestyle	Kim Da-san; South Korea	51.07	Lim Ching Hwang; Malaysia	51.14	Matthew Abeysinghe; Sri Lanka	51.52
200 m freestyle	Lim Ching Hwang; Malaysia	1:50.81	Quah Zheng Wen; Singapore	1:52.19	Tanakrit Kittiya; Thailand	1:52.94
50 m backstroke	Won Young-jun; South Korea	26.75	Lau Shiu Yue; Hong Kong	26.77	Tanapoom Krueakhamkhao; Thailand	26.83
100 m backstroke	Ricky Anggawijaya; Indonesia	58.42	Yang Chun-yao; Chinese Taipei	58.83	Won Young-jun; South Korea	58.90
200 m backstroke	Quah Zheng Wen; Singapore	2:03.17	Ricky Anggawijaya; Indonesia	2:06.70	Yang Chun-yao; Chinese Taipei	2:07.76
50 m breaststroke	Kim Jae-youn; South Korea	28.97	Cai Bing-rong; Chinese Taipei	29.24	Chao Man Hou; Macau	29.52
100 m breaststroke	Cai Bing-rong; Chinese Taipei	1:03.09	Kim Jae-youn; South Korea	1:03.21	Christopher Cheong; Singapore	1:04.72
200 m breaststroke	Cai Bing-rong; Chinese Taipei	2:14.68	Kim Jae-youn; South Korea	2:18.33	Wong Fu Kang; Malaysia	2:21.16
50 m butterfly	Supakrid Pananuratana; Thailand	25.17	Darren Lim; Singapore	25.32	Jung Jae-youn; South Korea	25.51
100 m butterfly	Jung Jae-youn; South Korea	54.68	Supakrid Pananuratana; Thailand	54.81	Kim Da-san; South Korea	55.60
200 m butterfly	Quah Zheng Wen; Singapore	1:59.98	Jung Jae-youn; South Korea	2:00.01	Tanakrit Kittiya; Thailand	2:02.06
200 m individual medley	Quah Zheng Wen; Singapore	2:04.86	Lee Ho-hyun; South Korea	2:06.58	Trần Duy Khôi; Vietnam	2:06.64
4 × 100 m freestyle relay	South Korea; Jung Jae-youn; Lee Ho-hyun; Kim Jae-youn; Kim Da-san; Won Young-jun	3:28.66	Singapore; Jerryl Yong; Darren Lim; Jeremy Tan; Quah Zheng Wen	3:29.63	Malaysia; Alwyn Tan; Welson Sim; Wong Fu Kang; Lim Ching Hwang	3:29.81
4 × 100 m medley relay	South Korea; Won Young-jun; Kim Jae-youn; Jung Jae-youn; Kim Da-san; Lee Ho-hyun	3:46.69	Chinese Taipei; Yang Chun-yao; Cai Bing-rong; Chou Wei-liang; An Ting-yao	3:50.83	Singapore; Quah Zheng Wen; Christopher Cheong; Jerryl Yong; Darren Lim	3:50.84

=== Girls ===
Event	Gold		Silver		Bronze	
50 m freestyle	Ko Mi-so; South Korea	26.07	Marina Chan; Singapore	26.29	Noel Leung; Hong Kong	26.91
100 m freestyle	Ko Mi-so; South Korea	56.76	Marina Chan; Singapore	57.56	Mo Lierr; Chinese Taipei	58.47
200 m freestyle	Sarisa Suwannachet; Thailand	2:02.19	Yang Ming-hsuan; Chinese Taipei	2:04.16	Lee Hee-eun; South Korea	2:04.73
50 m backstroke	Nguyễn Thị Ánh Viên; Vietnam	29.26	Im Da-sol; South Korea	29.47	Yu Yi-chen; Chinese Taipei	29.85
100 m backstroke	Im Da-sol; South Korea	1:03.08	Nguyễn Thị Ánh Viên; Vietnam	1:03.46	Yekaterina Dymchenko; Kazakhstan	1:03.95
200 m backstroke	Nguyễn Thị Ánh Viên; Vietnam	2:12.65	Im Da-sol; South Korea	2:15.09	Andrea Wan; Hong Kong	2:19.82
50 m breaststroke	Samantha Yeo; Singapore	32.56	Yang Ji-won; South Korea	32.79	Huang Wen-chi; Chinese Taipei	32.81
100 m breaststroke	Yang Ji-won; South Korea	1:09.63	Samantha Yeo; Singapore	1:10.71	Jamie Yeung; Hong Kong	1:11.33
200 m breaststroke	Yang Ji-won; South Korea	2:27.74	Samantha Yeo; Singapore	2:33.72	Jamie Yeung; Hong Kong	2:34.80
50 m butterfly	Ko Mi-so; South Korea	27.89	Yap Siew Hui; Malaysia	27.96	Park Jin-young; South Korea	28.04
100 m butterfly	Park Jin-young; South Korea	1:00.41	Meagan Lim; Singapore	1:01.58	Yap Siew Hui; Malaysia	1:02.15
200 m butterfly	Park Jin-young; South Korea	2:13.75	Sutasinee Pankaew; Thailand	2:15.10	Monalisa Arieswati; Indonesia	2:15.46
200 m individual medley	Nguyễn Thị Ánh Viên; Vietnam	2:15.09	Sarisa Suwannachet; Thailand	2:17.28	Lee Hee-eun; South Korea	2:17.93
4 × 100 m freestyle relay	South Korea; Ko Mi-so; Im Da-sol; Park Jin-young; Lee Hee-eun	3:53.28	Singapore; Samantha Yeo; Rachel Tseng; Hoong En Qi; Marina Chan	3:54.67	Thailand; Sarisa Suwannachet; Phiangkhwan Pawapotako; Kanitta Nimdam; Supasuta Sounthornchote	3:54.71
4 × 100 m medley relay	South Korea; Im Da-sol; Yang Ji-won; Park Jin-young; Ko Mi-so; Lee Hee-eun	4:10.17	Singapore; Stacy Tan; Samantha Yeo; Meagan Lim; Marina Chan	4:16.97	China; Su Yu; Yu Weiran; Yuan Yue; Li Bojie	4:20.92

== Medal table ==
Rank	Nation	Gold	Silver	Bronze	Total
1	South Korea (KOR)	16	7	7	30
2	Singapore (SIN)	5	10	2	17
3	Vietnam (VIE)	3	1	1	5
4	Chinese Taipei (TPE)	2	4	4	10
5	Thailand (THA)	2	3	4	9
6	Malaysia (MAS)	1	3	3	7
7	Indonesia (INA)	1	1	1	3
8	Hong Kong (HKG)	0	1	4	5
9	China (CHN)	0	0	1	1
9	Kazakhstan (KAZ)	0	0	1	1
9	Macau (MAC)	0	0	1	1
9	Sri Lanka (SRI)	0	0	1	1
Totals (12 entries)		30	30	30	90

== Results ==
=== Boys ===
==== 50 m freestyle ====
21–22 August

Rank	Athlete	Heats	SF	Final
1st place, gold medalist(s)	Darren Lim (SIN)	23.34	23.42	23.09
2nd place, silver medalist(s)	Lim Ching Hwang (MAS)	24.12	23.62	23.46
3rd place, bronze medalist(s)	Kim Da-san (KOR)	24.53	23.91	23.47
4	Stanislav Karnaukhov (KGZ)	24.12	23.87	24.03
5	Ma Yuxuan (CHN)	24.22	23.97	24.19
6	Alexandr Varakin (KAZ)	24.24	24.11	24.35
7	Alwyn Tan (MAS)	24.77	24.53	24.45
8	Yu Chien-te (TPE)	24.94	24.49	24.71
9	Samuel Preston White (INA)	24.62	24.63	
10	Michael Au (HKG)	24.78	24.65	
11	Asif Reza (BAN)	24.86	24.77	
12	Ma Sheng (CHN)	25.21	24.83	
13	Andrey Pravdivtsev (UZB)	24.83	24.84	
14	Ahmad Mustaghfirin (INA)	24.82	24.86	
15	Reza Beikmohammadi (IRI)	24.75	24.89	
16	Neil Contractor (AOI)	25.07	24.91	
17	Nima Abdollahi (IRI)	25.25		
18	Liao Yu-yeng (TPE)	25.38		
19	Anton Adilov (KAZ)	25.43		
19	Charlie Salame (LIB)	25.43		
21	Huỳnh Thế Vĩ (VIE)	25.97		
22	Issa Al-Adawi (OMA)	26.09		
23	Walentin Gorşkow (TKM)	26.20		
24	Faisal Serri (KUW)	26.53		
25	Khalid Al-Jahdhami (OMA)	26.88		
26	Tanapoom Krueakhamkhao (THA)	26.95		
27	Muhammad Yahya Khan (PAK)	27.26		
28	Muhammad Saad Amin (PAK)	27.30		
29	Nishwan Ibrahim (MDV)	28.04		
30	Phathana Inthavong (LAO)	28.30		
31	Supakrid Pananuratana (THA)	29.01		
32	Ebrahim Rajabi (AFG)	32.26		

==== 100 m freestyle ====
22–23 August

Rank	Athlete	Heats	SF	Final
1st place, gold medalist(s)	Kim Da-san (KOR)	52.58	52.73	51.07
2nd place, silver medalist(s)	Lim Ching Hwang (MAS)	52.24	52.24	51.14
3rd place, bronze medalist(s)	Matthew Abeysinghe (SRI)	52.43	52.42	51.52
4	Darren Lim (SIN)	54.39	52.49	51.54
5	Stanislav Karnaukhov (KGZ)	52.33	52.14	51.74
6	Chan Chun Hei (HKG)	53.89	53.31	53.42
7	Michael Au (HKG)	54.60	53.51	53.57
8	Jethro Chua (PHI)	54.03	53.55	54.01
9	Rafael Sta. Maria (PHI)	54.34	53.58	
10	Welson Sim (MAS)	52.64	53.60	
11	Alexandr Varakin (KAZ)	54.36	53.65	
12	Ahmad Mustaghfirin (INA)	54.45	53.72	
13	Andrey Pravdivtsev (UZB)	53.92	53.77	
14	Yu Chien-te (TPE)	54.29	53.90	
15	Jeremy Tan (SIN)	54.36	54.16	
16	Neil Contractor (AOI)	55.00	54.25	
17	Ma Sheng (CHN)	55.15		
18	Liao Yu-yeng (TPE)	55.85		
19	Samuel Preston White (INA)	55.95		
20	Anton Adilov (KAZ)	55.97		
21	Reza Beikmohammadi (IRI)	56.32		
21	Charlie Salame (LIB)	56.32		
23	Vũ Tân Thành (VIE)	56.39		
24	Hassan Al-Mubarak (KSA)	56.51		
25	Ahmed Al-Hashem (KSA)	57.68		
26	Leong Chi Hoi (MAC)	57.86		
27	Walentin Gorşkow (TKM)	58.43		
28	Nima Abdollahi (IRI)	58.78		
29	Khalid Al-Jahdhami (OMA)	59.28		
30	Muhammad Yahya Khan (PAK)	59.67		
31	Jiarapong Sangkhawat (THA)	59.71		
32	Faisal Serri (KUW)	1:00.39		
33	Abdulla Al-Blooshi (UAE)	1:00.53		
34	Sirish Gurung (NEP)	1:00.77		
35	Ma Yuxuan (CHN)	1:01.09		
36	Muhammad Saad Amin (PAK)	1:01.28		
37	Nishwan Ibrahim (MDV)	1:01.56		
38	Phathana Inthavong (LAO)	1:02.58		
39	Miraj Prajapati (NEP)	1:02.68		
40	Hasan Dana (PLE)	1:03.96		
—	Ebrahim Rajabi (AFG)	DNS		

==== 200 m freestyle ====
20 August

Rank	Athlete	Heats	Final
1st place, gold medalist(s)	Lim Ching Hwang (MAS)	1:53.35	1:50.81
2nd place, silver medalist(s)	Quah Zheng Wen (SIN)	1:53.61	1:52.19
3rd place, bronze medalist(s)	Tanakrit Kittiya (THA)	1:54.81	1:52.94
4	Kim Da-san (KOR)	1:53.60	1:52.98
5	Lee Ho-hyun (KOR)	1:54.05	1:53.16
6	Welson Sim (MAS)	1:53.84	1:53.61
7	Jethro Chua (PHI)	1:55.64	1:55.62
8	Satrio Bagaskara (INA)	1:55.26	1:57.38
9	Matthew Abeysinghe (SRI)	1:55.67	
10	Ricky Anggawijaya (INA)	1:55.79	
11	Lâm Quang Nhật (VIE)	1:56.14	
12	Stanislav Karnaukhov (KGZ)	1:56.19	
13	Jerryl Yong (SIN)	1:56.42	
13	Hsu Che-wei (TPE)	1:56.42	
15	Jiarapong Sangkhawat (THA)	1:56.81	
16	Yan Zongbo (CHN)	1:57.70	
17	An Ting-yao (TPE)	1:57.75	
18	Chan Chun Hei (HKG)	1:58.15	
19	Bakr Salam (IRQ)	1:58.63	
20	Artyom Kozlyuk (UZB)	1:58.93	
21	Lau Shiu Yue (HKG)	1:59.59	
22	Artyom Pukhnatiy (UZB)	1:59.68	
23	Zhao Zixi (CHN)	2:01.95	
24	Ahmad Mardenli (SYR)	2:02.92	
25	Trần Duy Khôi (VIE)	2:04.34	
26	Anton Adilov (KAZ)	2:05.58	
27	Ahmed Al-Hashem (KSA)	2:06.40	
28	Abdulrahman Al-Kulaibi (OMA)	2:06.63	
29	Leong Chi Hoi (MAC)	2:09.36	
30	Faisal Serri (KUW)	2:10.44	
31	Abdulla Al-Blooshi (UAE)	2:12.02	
32	Sirish Gurung (NEP)	2:12.42	
33	Muhammad Yahya Khan (PAK)	2:12.88	
34	Khalid Al-Jahdhami (OMA)	2:16.50	
35	Khaled Al-Shamsi (UAE)	2:18.56	

==== 50 m backstroke ====
22–23 August

Rank	Athlete	Heats	SF	Final
1st place, gold medalist(s)	Won Young-jun (KOR)	27.95	27.39	26.75
2nd place, silver medalist(s)	Lau Shiu Yue (HKG)	27.32	27.19	26.77
3rd place, bronze medalist(s)	Tanapoom Krueakhamkhao (THA)	27.75	27.01	26.83
4	Trần Duy Khôi (VIE)	27.52	27.41	27.15
5	Yang Chun-yao (TPE)	27.39	27.33	27.23
6	Mikhail Nikulshin (KAZ)	27.87	27.77	27.86
7	Rohit Imoliya (AOI)	28.02	27.92	27.93
—	Ricky Anggawijaya (INA)	27.58	27.49	DNS
9	Raham Peiravani (IRI)	28.30	28.19	
10	Mohsen Mehmannavaz (IRI)	28.31	28.38	
11	Adityastha Rai (INA)	28.52	28.53	
12	Nguyễn Ngọc Triển (VIE)	28.54	28.54	
13	Qin Pei (CHN)	28.92	28.58	
14	Yum Cheng Man (MAC)	28.87	29.25	
15	Garret Tan (SIN)	29.34	29.53	
16	Ameer Adnan (IRQ)	30.29	30.16	
17	Salman Mandany (KUW)	30.40		
18	Zhang Xingyu (CHN)	30.46		
19	Timur Latipov (UZB)	30.69		
20	Abdulrahman Al-Kulaibi (OMA)	30.91		
21	Mazen Al-Kulaibi (OMA)	32.97		

==== 100 m backstroke ====
19–20 August

Rank	Athlete	Heats	SF	Final
1st place, gold medalist(s)	Ricky Anggawijaya (INA)	59.72	58.85	58.42
2nd place, silver medalist(s)	Yang Chun-yao (TPE)	59.23	58.66	58.83
3rd place, bronze medalist(s)	Won Young-jun (KOR)	59.77	59.61	58.90
4	Trần Duy Khôi (VIE)	59.98	59.46	59.14
5	Lau Shiu Yue (HKG)	59.41	59.23	59.43
6	Arvind Mani (AOI)	1:00.25	59.51	59.99
7	Mikhail Nikulshin (KAZ)	1:00.19	59.76	1:00.60
8	Raham Peiravani (IRI)	1:00.58	59.79	1:02.07
9	Tanapoom Krueakhamkhao (THA)	1:00.73	1:00.05	
10	Lee Ho-hyun (KOR)	1:00.86	1:00.28	
11	Rohit Imoliya (AOI)	1:01.44	1:00.54	
12	Welson Sim (MAS)	1:00.79	1:00.61	
13	Qin Pei (CHN)	1:01.75	1:00.80	
14	Adityastha Rai (INA)	1:01.29	1:01.00	
15	Jeremy Tan (SIN)	1:01.70	1:01.40	
16	Mohsen Mehmannavaz (IRI)	1:01.64	1:01.42	
17	Garret Tan (SIN)	1:02.51		
18	Nguyễn Ngọc Triển (VIE)	1:02.57		
19	Yum Cheng Man (MAC)	1:03.32		
20	Salman Mandany (KUW)	1:04.27		
21	Zhang Xingyu (CHN)	1:04.93		
22	Abdulrahman Al-Kulaibi (OMA)	1:07.77		

==== 200 m backstroke ====
21 August

Rank	Athlete	Heats	Final
1st place, gold medalist(s)	Quah Zheng Wen (SIN)	2:10.53	2:03.17
2nd place, silver medalist(s)	Ricky Anggawijaya (INA)	2:11.09	2:06.70
3rd place, bronze medalist(s)	Yang Chun-yao (TPE)	2:09.59	2:07.76
4	Won Young-jun (KOR)	2:13.52	2:08.65
5	Arvind Mani (AOI)	2:12.35	2:10.11
6	Adityastha Rai (INA)	2:11.40	2:14.70
7	Nguyễn Ngọc Triển (VIE)	2:12.14	2:14.89
8	Raham Peiravani (IRI)	2:09.04	2:18.12
9	Garret Tan (SIN)	2:13.64	
10	Lau Shiu Yue (HKG)	2:13.93	
11	Qin Pei (CHN)	2:14.00	
12	Lâm Quang Nhật (VIE)	2:15.34	
13	Rohit Imoliya (AOI)	2:16.95	
14	Salman Mandany (KUW)	2:17.92	
15	Tanapoom Krueakhamkhao (THA)	2:19.16	
16	Zhang Xingyu (CHN)	2:23.29	
17	Abdulrahman Al-Kulaibi (OMA)	2:24.47	
18	Mohsen Mehmannavaz (IRI)	2:25.25	

==== 50 m breaststroke ====
19–20 August

Rank	Athlete	Heats	SF	Final
1st place, gold medalist(s)	Kim Jae-youn (KOR)	29.20	28.91	28.97
2nd place, silver medalist(s)	Cai Bing-rong (TPE)	29.74	29.33	29.24
3rd place, bronze medalist(s)	Chao Man Hou (MAC)	29.52	29.82	29.52
4	Wong Fu Kang (MAS)	29.89	29.92	29.78
5	Edmund Teo (SIN)	30.50	30.13	30.02
6	Xie Xiangfei (CHN)	30.72	30.01	30.23
7	Christopher Cheong (SIN)	29.97	29.76	30.25
8	Ilham Achmad Turmudzi (INA)	30.45	30.17	30.47
9	Sergey Kuchaba (KAZ)	30.59	30.36	
10	Huỳnh Thế Vĩ (VIE)	30.92	30.38	
10	Dmitriy Goverdovskiy (KAZ)	30.28	30.38	
12	Sutton Choi (HKG)	30.49	30.55	
13	Andrey Pravdivtsev (UZB)	31.00	30.61	
14	Tam Ka Ming (HKG)	30.67	30.85	
15	Satrio Bagaskara (INA)	31.10	30.97	
16	Nisit Chandrakoolphong (THA)	30.84	31.01	
17	Zhuo Hanchen (CHN)	31.33		
18	Charlie Salame (LIB)	31.69		
19	Likith Prema (AOI)	31.78		
20	Leong Chi Hoi (MAC)	31.88		
21	Hussain Al-Zaid (KUW)	31.89		
22	Abdullakhuja Akhrorkhujaev (UZB)	32.28		
23	Kameil Al-Qallaf (KSA)	32.35		
24	Yousif Al-Musallam (KUW)	33.20		
25	Issa Al-Adawi (OMA)	33.57		
26	Hamad Al-Wahshi (UAE)	34.08		
27	Chae Song-hun (PRK)	34.41		
28	Muhammad Paracha (PAK)	35.53		
29	Hamid Rahimi (AFG)	36.14		
30	Hasan Dana (PLE)	38.13		
—	Ameer Adnan (IRQ)	DNS		

==== 100 m breaststroke ====
20–21 August

Rank	Athlete	Heats	SF	Final
1st place, gold medalist(s)	Cai Bing-rong (TPE)	1:04.67	1:03.39	1:03.09
2nd place, silver medalist(s)	Kim Jae-youn (KOR)	1:05.37	1:05.60	1:03.21
3rd place, bronze medalist(s)	Christopher Cheong (SIN)	1:06.58	1:06.01	1:04.72
4	Wong Fu Kang (MAS)	1:06.51	1:06.22	1:04.79
5	Chao Man Hou (MAC)	1:06.98	1:06.03	1:04.85
6	Ilham Achmad Turmudzi (INA)	1:06.53	1:06.19	1:06.07
7	Samuel Khoo (SIN)	1:06.53	1:06.83	1:06.38
8	Dmitriy Goverdovskiy (KAZ)	1:06.44	1:06.28	1:06.63
9	Sutton Choi (HKG)	1:06.92	1:07.00	
10	Huỳnh Thế Vĩ (VIE)	1:07.54	1:07.18	
11	Sergey Kuchaba (KAZ)	1:07.77	1:07.28	
12	Phan Gia Mẫn (VIE)	1:08.48	1:07.30	
13	Yu Guobei (CHN)	1:09.62	1:08.41	
14	Andrey Pravdivtsev (UZB)	1:08.42	1:08.60	
15	Likith Prema (AOI)	1:09.47	1:08.62	
16	Satrio Bagaskara (INA)	1:09.18	1:09.66	
17	Xie Xiangfei (CHN)	1:04.33		
18	Hussain Al-Zaid (KUW)	1:09.92		
19	Tam Ka Ming (HKG)	1:10.52		
20	Abdullakhuja Akhrorkhujaev (UZB)	1:10.70		
21	Yousif Al-Musallam (KUW)	1:11.76		
22	Charlie Salame (LIB)	1:13.01		
23	Kameil Al-Qallaf (KSA)	1:14.53		
24	Issa Al-Adawi (OMA)	1:14.98		
25	Muhammad Paracha (PAK)	1:16.29		
26	Nisit Chandrakoolphong (THA)	1:16.86		
27	Hamad Al-Wahshi (UAE)	1:18.80		
28	Hamid Rahimi (AFG)	1:27.25		
—	Bakr Salam (IRQ)	DNS		
—	Neil Contractor (AOI)	DNS		

==== 200 m breaststroke ====
23 August

Rank	Athlete	Heats	Final
1st place, gold medalist(s)	Cai Bing-rong (TPE)	2:22.15	2:14.68
2nd place, silver medalist(s)	Kim Jae-youn (KOR)	2:23.55	2:18.33
3rd place, bronze medalist(s)	Wong Fu Kang (MAS)	2:24.17	2:21.16
4	Chao Man Hou (MAC)	2:26.32	2:21.75
5	Dmitriy Goverdovskiy (KAZ)	2:26.37	2:24.15
6	Huỳnh Thế Vĩ (VIE)	2:25.61	2:24.47
7	Aaron Teo (SIN)	2:25.81	2:25.25
8	Zhuo Hanchen (CHN)	2:26.87	2:26.59
9	Phan Gia Mẫn (VIE)	2:27.16	
10	Sutton Choi (HKG)	2:27.21	
11	Ilham Achmad Turmudzi (INA)	2:29.17	
12	Sergey Kuchaba (KAZ)	2:29.66	
13	Yu Guobei (CHN)	2:30.97	
14	Christopher Cheong (SIN)	2:31.06	
15	Likith Prema (AOI)	2:31.07	
16	Muhammad Hamgari (INA)	2:32.04	
17	Yousif Al-Musallam (KUW)	2:35.51	
18	Abdullakhuja Akhrorkhujaev (UZB)	2:35.79	
19	Nisit Chandrakoolphong (THA)	2:42.76	
20	Muhammad Paracha (PAK)	2:46.67	
—	Hussain Al-Zaid (KUW)	DSQ	

==== 50 m butterfly ====
20–21 August

Rank	Athlete	Heats	SF	Final
1st place, gold medalist(s)	Supakrid Pananuratana (THA)	25.43	25.27	25.17
2nd place, silver medalist(s)	Darren Lim (SIN)	25.79	25.49	25.32
3rd place, bronze medalist(s)	Jung Jae-youn (KOR)	25.75	25.45	25.51
4	Tanapoom Krueakhamkhao (THA)	25.88	25.62	25.55
5	Kim Da-san (KOR)	26.19	25.74	25.64
6	Alexandr Varakin (KAZ)	25.70	25.65	25.69
7	Kwong Ka Ho (HKG)	26.10	25.91	25.99
8	Samuel Preston White (INA)	26.29	25.90	26.02
9	Jerryl Yong (SIN)	26.11	25.98	
10	Rakshith Shetty (AOI)	26.29	26.15	
11	Mikhail Nikulshin (KAZ)	26.01	26.23	
12	Supriya Mondal (AOI)	26.57	26.30	
13	Kenny Lisanputera (INA)	26.64	26.32	
14	Alwyn Tan (MAS)	26.83	26.38	
15	Raham Peiravani (IRI)	26.58	26.47	
16	Liao Yu-yeng (TPE)	26.91 ^{(27.60)}	26.95	
17	Chou Wei-liang (TPE)	26.91 ^{(27.74)}		
18	Timur Latipov (UZB)	26.97		
19	Leung Chi Tou (MAC)	27.20		
20	Ameer Adnan (IRQ)	27.25		
21	Hassan Al-Mubarak (KSA)	27.77		
22	Walentin Gorşkow (TKM)	27.87		
23	Zhang Nuoya (CHN)	28.03		
24	Reza Beikmohammadi (IRI)	28.18		
25	Li Yuanhao (CHN)	28.46		
26	Mazen Al-Kulaibi (OMA)	28.61		
27	Nidhal Al-Harrasi (OMA)	28.68		
28	Muhammad Saad Amin (PAK)	29.13		
29	Nishwan Ibrahim (MDV)	30.20		

==== 100 m butterfly ====
21–22 August

Rank	Athlete	Heats	SF	Final
1st place, gold medalist(s)	Jung Jae-youn (KOR)	56.98	55.34	54.68
2nd place, silver medalist(s)	Supakrid Pananuratana (THA)	56.61	56.07	54.81
3rd place, bronze medalist(s)	Kim Da-san (KOR)	56.38	55.82	55.60
4	Jerryl Yong (SIN)	57.08	56.41	56.57
5	Kwong Ka Ho (HKG)	57.64	56.76	56.59
6	Tanakrit Kittiya (THA)	57.81	56.81	56.67
7	Ma Yuxuan (CHN)	57.44	56.43	56.72
8	Chou Wei-liang (TPE)	57.50	56.44	57.19
9	Matthew Abeysinghe (SRI)	57.67	56.90	
10	Phan Gia Mẫn (VIE)	58.12	57.42	
11	Alwyn Tan (MAS)	59.06	57.68	
12	Kenny Lisanputera (INA)	58.24	57.71	
13	Satrio Bagaskara (INA)	58.02	57.77	
14	Rakshith Shetty (AOI)	57.97	57.85	
15	Jeremy Lim (PHI)	58.10	58.24	
16	Artyom Pukhnatiy (UZB)	59.48	59.76	
17	Trần Duy Khôi (VIE)	58.16		
18	Wong Fu Kang (MAS)	59.06		
19	Ameer Adnan (IRQ)	59.73		
20	Leung Chi Tou (MAC)	1:00.51		
21	Li Yuanhao (CHN)	1:01.58		
22	Artyom Kozlyuk (UZB)	1:02.17		
23	Kamyab Karimi (IRI)	1:02.44		
24	Hassan Al-Mubarak (KSA)	1:03.27		
25	Nidhal Al-Harrasi (OMA)	1:04.28		
26	Mazen Al-Kulaibi (OMA)	1:05.59		
—	Supriya Mondal (AOI)	DNS		

==== 200 m butterfly ====
19 August

Rank	Athlete	Heats	Final
1st place, gold medalist(s)	Quah Zheng Wen (SIN)	2:06.33	1:59.98
2nd place, silver medalist(s)	Jung Jae-youn (KOR)	2:05.75	2:00.01
3rd place, bronze medalist(s)	Tanakrit Kittiya (THA)	2:04.63	2:02.06
4	Chou Wei-liang (TPE)	2:06.93	2:03.38
5	Jerryl Yong (SIN)	2:06.97	2:05.51
6	Supriya Mondal (AOI)	2:07.97	2:06.24
7	Kenny Lisanputera (INA)	2:07.74	2:07.73
8	Kwong Ka Ho (HKG)	2:07.77	2:08.22
9	Muhammad Hamgari (INA)	2:08.69	
10	Phan Gia Mẫn (VIE)	2:09.61	
11	Hsu Che-wei (TPE)	2:11.08	
12	Artyom Pukhnatiy (UZB)	2:15.16	
13	Kamyab Karimi (IRI)	2:16.42	
14	Artyom Kozlyuk (UZB)	2:19.09	
15	Li Yuanhao (CHN)	2:21.23	
16	Ye Yuchao (CHN)	2:28.29	
17	Nidhal Al-Harrasi (OMA)	2:30.84	

==== 200 m individual medley ====
22 August

Rank	Athlete	Heats	Final
1st place, gold medalist(s)	Quah Zheng Wen (SIN)	2:10.20	2:04.86
2nd place, silver medalist(s)	Lee Ho-hyun (KOR)	2:09.54	2:06.58
3rd place, bronze medalist(s)	Trần Duy Khôi (VIE)	2:09.70	2:06.64
4	Nisit Chandrakoolphong (THA)	2:10.68	2:07.16
5	Jiarapong Sangkhawat (THA)	2:10.64	2:07.52
6	Chou Wei-liang (TPE)	2:11.63	2:08.47
7	Muhammad Hamgari (INA)	2:09.98	2:09.79
—	Xie Xiangfei (CHN)	2:09.42	DSQ
9	Kwong Ka Ho (HKG)	2:12.91	
10	Artyom Pukhnatiy (UZB)	2:13.34	
11	Mikhail Nikulshin (KAZ)	2:13.82	
12	Sutton Choi (HKG)	2:13.98	
13	Arvind Mani (AOI)	2:14.27	
14	An Ting-yao (TPE)	2:16.79	
15	Raham Peiravani (IRI)	2:17.96	
16	Artyom Kozlyuk (UZB)	2:19.11	
17	Wong Fu Kang (MAS)	2:19.59	
18	Ahmad Mardenli (SYR)	2:20.66	
19	Kenny Lisanputera (INA)	2:21.69	
20	Mohsen Mehmannavaz (IRI)	2:27.10	
21	Ahmed Al-Hashem (KSA)	2:29.51	
22	Issa Al-Adawi (OMA)	2:30.00	
23	Kameil Al-Qallaf (KSA)	2:30.95	
24	Khaled Al-Shamsi (UAE)	2:38.41	
—	Fu Kangqi (CHN)	DSQ	
—	Bakr Salam (IRQ)	DNS	

==== 4 × 100 m freestyle relay ====
20 August

Rank	Team	Heats	Final
1st place, gold medalist(s)	South Korea (KOR)	3:35.10	3:28.66
2nd place, silver medalist(s)	Singapore (SIN)	3:32.51	3:29.63
3rd place, bronze medalist(s)	Malaysia (MAS)	3:35.18	3:29.81
4	Thailand (THA)	3:35.32	3:31.00
5	Chinese Taipei (TPE)	3:35.69	3:32.06
6	China (CHN)	3:35.26	3:32.35
7	Hong Kong (HKG)	3:36.01	3:34.18
8	Kazakhstan (KAZ)	3:36.87	3:37.44
9	Indonesia (INA)	3:37.20	
10	Vietnam (VIE)	3:42.18	
11	Uzbekistan (UZB)	3:43.26	
12	Macau (MAC)	3:48.94	
13	Iran (IRI)	3:49.45	
14	Independent Olympic Athletes (AOI)	4:04.89	
—	Oman (OMA)	DNS	

==== 4 × 100 m medley relay ====
22 August

Rank	Team	Heats	Final
1st place, gold medalist(s)	South Korea (KOR)	3:53.84	3:46.69
2nd place, silver medalist(s)	Chinese Taipei (TPE)	3:54.94	3:50.83
3rd place, bronze medalist(s)	Singapore (SIN)	3:57.23	3:50.84
4	Indonesia (INA)	3:58.53	3:54.92
5	Hong Kong (HKG)	4:00.65	3:59.00
6	Malaysia (MAS)	3:59.22	4:01.88
7	Macau (MAC)	4:08.07	4:05.68
—	China (CHN)	4:01.09	DSQ
9	Kazakhstan (KAZ)	4:08.34	
10	Independent Olympic Athletes (AOI)	4:10.45	
11	Uzbekistan (UZB)	4:10.77	
12	Iran (IRI)	4:27.14	
13	Oman (OMA)	4:30.95	
—	Thailand (THA)	DSQ	

=== Girls ===
==== 50 m freestyle ====
21–22 August

Rank	Athlete	Heats	SF	Final
1st place, gold medalist(s)	Ko Mi-so (KOR)	27.00	26.26	26.07
2nd place, silver medalist(s)	Marina Chan (SIN)	26.65	26.43	26.29
3rd place, bronze medalist(s)	Noel Leung (HKG)	27.23	27.23	26.91
4	Mo Lierr (TPE)	27.55	27.19	26.93
5	Ching Cho Miu (HKG)	27.00	26.75	26.95
6	Yekaterina Russova (KAZ)	27.59	27.35	27.26
7	Hoong En Qi (SIN)	27.77	27.46	27.37
8	Kok Cher Ling (MAS)	27.49	27.40	27.52
9	Yuan Yue (CHN)	27.64	27.47	
10	Shivani Kataria (AOI)	27.65	27.52	
11	Joanita Mutiara Hapsari (INA)	27.87	27.77	
12	Avantika Chavan (AOI)	27.77	27.93	
13	Chen Pin-hsuan (TPE)	28.08	27.96	
14	Choi Weng Tong (MAC)	28.38	28.17	
15	Sagita Putri Krisdewanti (INA)	28.22	28.36	
—	Jennifer Rizkallah (LIB)	28.81	DNS	
17	Supasuta Sounthornchote (THA)	28.17		
18	Yap Siew Hui (MAS)	28.52		
19	Merjen Saryýewa (TKM)	29.52		
20	Kseniya Melnikova (UZB)	29.68		
21	Liu Yuan (CHN)	29.92		
22	Najma Khatun (BAN)	30.24		
23	Irina Ushakova (UZB)	31.83		
24	Anaida Mitha (PAK)	31.92		
25	Karina Klimyk (TJK)	32.13		
26	Aishath Sajina (MDV)	34.06		
27	Yara Nahas (PLE)	35.67		
28	Fathimath Zuhura Ismail (MDV)	36.52		

==== 100 m freestyle ====
22–23 August

Rank	Athlete	Heats	SF	Final
1st place, gold medalist(s)	Ko Mi-so (KOR)	59.03	58.46	56.76
2nd place, silver medalist(s)	Marina Chan (SIN)	59.73	59.20	57.56
3rd place, bronze medalist(s)	Mo Lierr (TPE)	59.96	59.37	58.47
4	Noel Leung (HKG)	59.14	59.18	58.53
5	Kung Pei-syuan (TPE)	59.98	59.23	58.64
6	Samantha Yeo (SIN)	1:00.01	59.27	58.72
7	Shivani Kataria (AOI)	59.63	59.53	59.30
8	Kan Tsz Yiu (HKG)	59.95	59.48	1:00.01
9	Li Bojie (CHN)	59.64	59.88	
10	Machiko Raheem (SRI)	59.49	59.90	
11	Sagita Putri Krisdewanti (INA)	1:00.49	1:00.11	
12	Yekaterina Russova (KAZ)	1:00.02	1:00.15	
13	Chris Tan (MAS)	1:00.44	1:00.49	
14	Joanita Mutiara Hapsari (INA)	1:00.78	1:00.72	
15	Catherine Bondad (PHI)	1:00.79	1:01.09	
16	Kok Cher Ling (MAS)	1:01.07	1:01.89	
17	Choi Weng Tong (MAC)	1:01.96		
18	Supasuta Sounthornchote (THA)	1:02.43		
19	Long Chi Wai (MAC)	1:02.96		
20	Jennifer Rizkallah (LIB)	1:03.48		
21	Nermeen Jirdy (SYR)	1:03.54		
22	Kseniya Melnikova (UZB)	1:05.03		
23	Bi Jinmiao (CHN)	1:05.10		
24	Merjen Saryýewa (TKM)	1:07.27		
25	Irina Ushakova (UZB)	1:09.64		
26	Karina Klimyk (TJK)	1:12.82		
27	Anaida Mitha (PAK)	1:13.67		
28	Areesha Saif (MDV)	1:14.02		
29	Fathimath Zuhura Ismail (MDV)	1:28.26		

==== 200 m freestyle ====
20 August

Rank	Athlete	Heats	Final
1st place, gold medalist(s)	Sarisa Suwannachet (THA)	2:05.02	2:02.09
2nd place, silver medalist(s)	Yang Ming-hsuan (TPE)	2:07.30	2:04.16
3rd place, bronze medalist(s)	Lee Hee-eun (KOR)	2:08.44	2:04.73
4	Marina Chan (SIN)	2:07.48	2:06.27
5	Rachel Tseng (SIN)	2:10.77	2:06.96
6	Shivani Kataria (AOI)	2:09.84	2:08.32
7	Monique Gandhi (AOI)	2:10.79	2:10.10
8	Iffy Nadia Fahmiruwhanti (INA)	2:10.55	2:11.08
9	Noel Leung (HKG)	2:10.84	
10	Machiko Raheem (SRI)	2:11.18	
11	Monalisa Arieswati (INA)	2:11.77	
12	Chris Tan (MAS)	2:12.05	
13	Li Jiayi (CHN)	2:12.31	
14	Catherine Bondad (PHI)	2:12.47	
15	Kristen Daos (PHI)	2:12.80	
16	Kung Pei-syuan (TPE)	2:13.55	
17	Tam Hoi Lam (HKG)	2:15.14	
18	Shi Yuxin (CHN)	2:15.51	
19	Tan Rou Ying (MAS)	2:15.90	
20	Shokhsanamkhon Toshpulatova (UZB)	2:18.58	
21	Erica Vong (MAC)	2:19.88	
22	Long Chi Wai (MAC)	2:20.71	
23	Aditi Dhital (NEP)	2:44.64	
—	Nodirakhon Shamsutdinova (UZB)	DNS	

==== 50 m backstroke ====
22–23 August

Rank	Athlete	Heats	SF	Final
1st place, gold medalist(s)	Nguyễn Thị Ánh Viên (VIE)	30.54	29.94	29.26
2nd place, silver medalist(s)	Im Da-sol (KOR)	29.90	30.08	29.47
3rd place, bronze medalist(s)	Yu Yi-chen (TPE)	30.67	30.54	29.85
4	Yekaterina Dymchenko (KAZ)	30.68	30.22	30.08
5	Andrea Wan (HKG)	30.65	30.49	30.23
6	Hsu An (TPE)	31.19	30.67	30.53
7	Erica Vong (MAC)	31.18	30.58	30.63
8	Su Yu (CHN)	31.11	30.79	30.72
9	Guo Sijia (CHN)	31.22	30.81	
10	Kanitta Nimdam (THA)	31.05	30.92	
11	Lau Sze Wing (HKG)	31.31	30.98	
12	Stacy Tan (SIN)	31.20	31.04	
13	Nurul Fajar Fitriyati (INA)	31.69	31.50	
14	Tan Rou Ying (MAS)	32.00	31.85	
15	Avantika Chavan (AOI)	32.22	31.86	
16	Anak Agung Istri Kania Ratih (INA)	31.48	32.93	
17	Yap Siew Hui (MAS)	32.73		
18	Nguyễn Ngọc Bảo Nguyên (VIE)	33.05		
19	Ho Mo-ran (PRK)	33.33		
20	Jennifer Rizkallah (LIB)	33.62		
21	Anaida Mitha (PAK)	38.28		

==== 100 m backstroke ====
19–20 August

Rank	Athlete	Heats	SF	Final
1st place, gold medalist(s)	Im Da-sol (KOR)	1:04.49	1:03.76	1:03.08
2nd place, silver medalist(s)	Nguyễn Thị Ánh Viên (VIE)	1:04.60	1:03.58	1:03.46
3rd place, bronze medalist(s)	Yekaterina Dymchenko (KAZ)	1:05.40	1:04.10	1:03.95
4	Hsu An (TPE)	1:05.69	1:05.18	1:04.60
5	Andrea Wan (HKG)	1:05.66	1:05.30	1:05.00
6	Su Yu (CHN)	1:06.92	1:05.99	1:06.14
7	Erica Vong (MAC)	1:06.90	1:06.24	1:06.74
8	Lau Sze Wing (HKG)	1:06.75	1:06.69	1:06.85
9	Meagan Lim (SIN)	1:06.82	1:06.86	
10	Ariana Herranz (PHI)	1:07.52	1:07.38	
11	Roxanne Yu (PHI)	1:07.43	1:07.45	
12	Nurul Fajar Fitriyati (INA)	1:07.95	1:07.58	
13	Stacy Tan (SIN)	1:07.51	1:07.60	
14	Chris Tan (MAS)	1:08.75	1:08.05	
15	Anak Agung Istri Kania Ratih (INA)	1:08.07	1:08.20	
16	Tan Rou Ying (MAS)	1:09.84	1:09.93	
17	Guo Sijia (CHN)	1:09.92		
18	Shokhsanamkhon Toshpulatova (UZB)	1:11.05		
19	Jennifer Rizkallah (LIB)	1:11.30		
20	Nguyễn Ngọc Bảo Nguyên (VIE)	1:11.58		
21	Ho Mo-ran (PRK)	1:13.20		
22	Irina Ushakova (UZB)	1:16.27		
23	Areesha Saif (PAK)	1:23.74		

==== 200 m backstroke ====
21 August

Rank	Athlete	Heats	Final
1st place, gold medalist(s)	Nguyễn Thị Ánh Viên (VIE)	2:16.16	2:12.65
2nd place, silver medalist(s)	Im Da-sol (KOR)	2:17.31	2:15.09
3rd place, bronze medalist(s)	Andrea Wan (HKG)	2:23.35	2:19.82
4	Yekaterina Dymchenko (KAZ)	2:23.83	2:21.66
5	Hsu An (TPE)	2:24.03	2:21.96
6	Meagan Lim (SIN)	2:24.58	2:24.29
7	Erica Vong (MAC)	2:27.71	2:26.02
8	Lau Sze Wing (HKG)	2:25.62	2:26.32
9	Nurul Fajar Fitriyati (INA)	2:27.41	
10	Chris Tan (MAS)	2:29.13	
11	Catherine Bondad (PHI)	2:30.31	
12	Olivia Fernandez (INA)	2:31.82	
13	Machiko Raheem (SRI)	2:33.17	
14	Tan Rou Ying (MAS)	2:36.19	
15	Zhang Yue (CHN)	2:38.48	
16	Irina Ushakova (UZB)	2:38.98	
17	Wang Kexin (CHN)	2:44.47	

==== 50 m breaststroke ====
19–20 August

Rank	Athlete	Heats	SF	Final
1st place, gold medalist(s)	Samantha Yeo (SIN)	32.76	32.88	32.56
2nd place, silver medalist(s)	Yang Ji-won (KOR)	33.30	32.85	32.79
3rd place, bronze medalist(s)	Huang Wen-chi (TPE)	33.16	33.01	32.81
4	Yu Weiran (CHN)	33.48	33.13	32.96
5	Jamie Yeung (HKG)	33.40	33.19	32.97
6	Phee Jinq En (MAS)	34.15	33.72	33.49
7	Phiangkhwan Pawapotako (THA)	34.09	34.26 ^{(33.70)}	33.96
8	Irina Sorokina (KAZ)	34.59	33.80	34.05
9	Nadia Redza (MAS)	34.42	34.26 ^{(34.11)}	
10	Qin Siqi (CHN)	34.92	34.31	
11	Kan Tsz Yiu (HKG)	34.65	34.98	
12	Joanita Mutiara Hapsari (INA)	35.77	36.13	
13	Kavita Chrishna Sulistyaning (INA)	35.50	36.18	
14	Lê Thị Hà My (VIE)	36.30	36.54	
15	A. V. Jayaveena (AOI)	36.72	36.90	
16	Nodirakhon Shamsutdinova (UZB)	37.53	37.82	
17	Chen Pin-hsuan (TPE)	39.09		
18	Chou Cheng Han (MAC)	39.11		
19	Karina Klimyk (TJK)	42.96		
20	Aishath Sajina (MDV)	44.04		
21	Aditi Dhital (NEP)	44.74		
22	Fathimath Zuhura Ismail (MDV)	50.32		
—	Yara Nahas (PLE)	DNS		

==== 100 m breaststroke ====
20–21 August

Rank	Athlete	Heats	SF	Final
1st place, gold medalist(s)	Yang Ji-won (KOR)	1:11.71	1:12.49	1:09.63
2nd place, silver medalist(s)	Samantha Yeo (SIN)	1:11.74	1:11.39	1:10.71
3rd place, bronze medalist(s)	Jamie Yeung (HKG)	1:12.29	1:12.42	1:11.33
4	Huang Wen-chi (TPE)	1:15.62	1:12.95	1:11.98
5	Phee Jinq En (MAS)	1:15.64	1:14.24	1:12.85
6	Phiangkhwan Pawapotako (THA)	1:14.19	1:13.74	1:13.06
7	Nadia Redza (MAS)	1:13.97	1:13.76	1:14.05
8	Yu Weiran (CHN)	1:13.06	1:14.43	1:14.25
9	Qin Siqi (CHN)	1:16.85	1:15.67	
10	Irina Sorokina (KAZ)	1:15.70	1:15.76	
11	Kavita Chrishna Sulistyaning (INA)	1:16.83	1:16.30	
12	Kanitta Nimdam (THA)	1:18.77	1:17.43	
13	Joanita Mutiara Hapsari (INA)	1:18.34	1:18.50	
14	Monique Gandhi (AOI)	1:19.63	1:19.15	
15	Nodirakhon Shamsutdinova (UZB)	1:20.20	1:21.71	
16	Lê Thị Hà My (VIE)	1:19.87	1:22.90	
17	A. V. Jayaveena (AOI)	1:20.64		
18	Nermeen Jirdy (SYR)	1:24.11		
19	Chou Cheng Han (MAC)	1:27.43		
20	Aishath Sajina (MDV)	1:40.17		

==== 200 m breaststroke ====
23 August

Rank	Athlete	Heats	Final
1st place, gold medalist(s)	Yang Ji-won (KOR)	2:34.41	2:27.74
2nd place, silver medalist(s)	Samantha Yeo (SIN)	2:35.84	2:33.72
3rd place, bronze medalist(s)	Jamie Yeung (HKG)	2:38.60	2:34.80
4	Phiangkhwan Pawapotako (THA)	2:37.55	2:35.38
5	Huang Wen-chi (TPE)	2:40.98	2:36.79
6	Nadia Redza (MAS)	2:35.66	2:37.96
7	Yu Weiran (CHN)	2:40.56	2:40.07
8	Kavita Chrishna Sulistyaning (INA)	2:43.24	2:43.28
9	Irina Sorokina (KAZ)	2:47.09	
10	Phee Jinq En (MAS)	2:47.74	
11	Qin Siqi (CHN)	2:49.96	
12	Kanitta Nimdam (THA)	2:52.03	
13	Nodirakhon Shamsutdinova (UZB)	2:52.30	
14	Lê Thị Hà My (VIE)	2:53.28	
15	Joanita Mutiara Hapsari (INA)	2:55.52	
16	Monique Gandhi (AOI)	2:57.97	
17	A. V. Jayaveena (AOI)	2:58.26	

==== 50 m butterfly ====
20–21 August

Rank	Athlete	Heats	SF	Final
1st place, gold medalist(s)	Ko Mi-so (KOR)	28.48	28.07	27.89
2nd place, silver medalist(s)	Yap Siew Hui (MAS)	28.69	28.31	27.96
3rd place, bronze medalist(s)	Park Jin-young (KOR)	28.61	28.38	28.04
4	Yu Yi-chen (TPE)	28.57	28.12	28.15
5	Hoong En Qi (SIN)	29.00	28.30	28.20
6	Noel Leung (HKG)	28.99	28.43	28.30
7	Tam Hoi Lam (HKG)	29.09	28.39	28.35
8	Yekaterina Russova (KAZ)	29.23	28.68	28.51
9	Symbat Nazaraliyeva (KAZ)	28.53	28.86	
10	Nguyễn Ngọc Bảo Nguyên (VIE)	29.76	29.37	
11	Nurul Fajar Fitriyati (INA)	29.92	29.59	
12	Olivia Fernandez (INA)	29.96	29.63	
13	Ngô Thu Hà (VIE)	29.94	29.66	
14	Avantika Chavan (AOI)	30.21	29.73	
15	Li Jiaxin (CHN)	30.20	29.81	
16	Chen Pin-hsuan (TPE)	30.05	29.86	
17	Supasuta Sounthornchote (THA)	29.41		
18	Tan Rou Ying (MAS)	30.30		
19	Jennifer Rizkallah (LIB)	30.77		
20	Guan Yueqi (CHN)	31.21		
21	Ho Mo-ran (PRK)	31.58		
22	Najma Khatun (BAN)	31.79		
23	Choi Weng Tong (MAC)	31.87		
24	Merjen Saryýewa (TKM)	32.69		
25	Kseniya Fomicheva (UZB)	33.15		
26	Veomany Siriphone (LAO)	35.18		

==== 100 m butterfly ====
21–22 August

Rank	Athlete	Heats	SF	Final
1st place, gold medalist(s)	Park Jin-young (KOR)	1:03.98	1:02.50	1:00.41
2nd place, silver medalist(s)	Meagan Lim (SIN)	1:04.37	1:03.22	1:01.58
3rd place, bronze medalist(s)	Yap Siew Hui (MAS)	1:04.13	1:03.89	1:02.15
4	Supasuta Sounthornchote (THA)	1:03.51	1:02.94	1:02.68
5	Sutasinee Pankaew (THA)	1:04.97	1:03.58	1:03.10
6	Symbat Nazaraliyeva (KAZ)	1:04.88	1:04.17	1:03.50
7	Monalisa Arieswati (INA)	1:04.21	1:04.09	1:04.44
8	Tan Rou Ying (MAS)	1:06.38	1:04.71	1:04.87
9	Olivia Fernandez (INA)	1:05.85	1:04.76	
10	Kristen Daos (PHI)	1:06.57	1:05.31	
11	Yu Yi-chen (TPE)	1:04.99	1:05.53	
12	Hoong En Qi (SIN)	1:05.88	1:05.79	
13	Tam Hoi Lam (HKG)	1:04.10	1:05.82	
14	Ngô Thu Hà (VIE)	1:06.09	1:05.89	
15	Li Jiaxin (CHN)	1:08.91	1:07.75	
16	Guan Yueqi (CHN)	1:08.04	1:07.80	
17	Kseniya Fomicheva (UZB)	1:13.44		

==== 200 m butterfly ====
19 August

Rank	Athlete	Heats	Final
1st place, gold medalist(s)	Park Jin-young (KOR)	2:19.52	2:13.75
2nd place, silver medalist(s)	Sutasinee Pankaew (THA)	2:18.99	2:15.10
3rd place, bronze medalist(s)	Monalisa Arieswati (INA)	2:18.59	2:15.46
4	Lee Hee-eun (KOR)	2:19.32	2:15.68
5	Meagan Lim (SIN)	2:19.21	2:17.03
6	Kanitta Nimdam (THA)	2:21.09	2:22.14
7	Angela Chieng (MAS)	2:22.85	2:22.79
8	Nguyễn Ngọc Bảo Nguyên (VIE)	2:24.21	2:23.66
9	Yap Siew Hui (MAS)	2:25.72	
10	Olivia Fernandez (INA)	2:28.00	
11	Li Jiayi (CHN)	2:28.48	
12	Li Jiaxin (CHN)	2:30.06	
13	Symbat Nazaraliyeva (KAZ)	2:32.89	

==== 200 m individual medley ====
22 August

Rank	Athlete	Heats	Final
1st place, gold medalist(s)	Nguyễn Thị Ánh Viên (VIE)	2:20.61	2:15.09
2nd place, silver medalist(s)	Sarisa Suwannachet (THA)	2:22.64	2:17.28
3rd place, bronze medalist(s)	Lee Hee-eun (KOR)	2:23.92	2:17.93
4	Phiangkhwan Pawapotako (THA)	2:21.03	2:19.06
5	Yang Ming-hsuan (TPE)	2:24.23	2:21.06
6	Samantha Yeo (SIN)	2:23.91	2:21.39
7	Im Da-sol (KOR)	2:24.68	2:21.80
8	Nadia Redza (MAS)	2:24.38	2:24.96
9	Meagan Lim (SIN)	2:25.22	
10	Irina Sorokina (KAZ)	2:27.81	
11	Tam Hoi Lam (HKG)	2:27.86	
12	Kan Tsz Yiu (HKG)	2:28.12	
13	Nguyễn Ngọc Bảo Nguyên (VIE)	2:29.50	
14	A. V. Jayaveena (AOI)	2:29.68	
15	Monalisa Arieswati (INA)	2:30.36	
16	Olivia Fernandez (INA)	2:30.47	
17	Hsu An (TPE)	2:30.65	
18	Shokhsanamkhon Toshpulatova (UZB)	2:31.97	
19	Zhang Ziyu (CHN)	2:33.50	
20	Gao Meng (CHN)	2:41.64	
21	Long Chi Wai (MAC)	2:45.44	
22	Areesha Saif (PAK)	3:02.57	

==== 4 × 100 m freestyle relay ====
19 August

Rank	Team	Heats	Final
1st place, gold medalist(s)	South Korea (KOR)	3:56.47	3:53.28
2nd place, silver medalist(s)	Singapore (SIN)	3:56.90	3:54.67
3rd place, bronze medalist(s)	Thailand (THA)	4:00.40	3:54.71
4	Chinese Taipei (TPE)	3:56.61	3:56.37
5	Hong Kong (HKG)	3:57.09	3:56.61
6	China (CHN)	3:59.23	3:59.31
7	Malaysia (MAS)	4:05.09	4:03.86
8	Indonesia (INA)	4:06.48	4:04.78
9	Independent Olympic Athletes (AOI)	4:08.73	
10	Kazakhstan (KAZ)	4:11.28	
11	Macau (MAC)	4:12.24	
12	Uzbekistan (UZB)	4:20.67	

==== 4 × 100 m medley relay ====
21 August

Rank	Team	Heats	Final
1st place, gold medalist(s)	South Korea (KOR)	4:22.22	4:10.17
2nd place, silver medalist(s)	Singapore (SIN)	4:22.38	4:16.97
3rd place, bronze medalist(s)	China (CHN)	4:21.95	4:20.92
4	Chinese Taipei (TPE)	4:25.91	4:22.05
5	Kazakhstan (KAZ)	4:26.78	4:26.35
6	Indonesia (INA)	4:27.45	4:28.18
7	Macau (MAC)	4:50.86	4:48.72
—	Hong Kong (HKG)	4:21.87	DSQ
9	Thailand (THA)	4:28.77	
10	Malaysia (MAS)	4:32.43	
11	Uzbekistan (UZB)	4:52.67	
