= Oman at the 2024 Summer Paralympics =

- IPC code: OMA
- NPC: Oman Paralympic Committee

in Paris, France August 28, 2024 – September 8, 2024
- Competitors: 2 (1 man and 1 woman) in 1 sport
- Flag bearers: Sara Al Anburi; Mohammed Al Mashaykhi
- Medals: Gold 0 Silver 0 Bronze 0 Total 0

Summer Paralympics appearances (overview)
- 1988; 1992; 1996; 2000; 2004; 2008; 2012; 2016; 2020; 2024

Oman competed at the 2024 Summer Paralympics in Paris, France, from 28 August to 8 September 2024. This was the nation's tenth time competing at the Summer Paralympic Games after it made its debut at the 1988 Summer Paralympics. The delegation consisted of two competitors from one sport.

== Competitors ==
The following is the list of number of competitors in the Games.

| Sport | Men | Women | Total |
|---|---|---|---|
| Athletics | 1 | 1 | 2 |
| Total | 1 | 1 | 2 |

== Athletics ==
| Athlete | Event | Heat | | Final | |
| Athlete | Event | Result | Rank | Result | Rank |
|---|---|---|---|---|---|
| Sara Al Anburi | Women's shot put F34 | = | | 5.17 | 11 |
| Mohammed Al Mashaykhi | Men's shot put F32 | = | | 8.57 | 7 |

== See also ==
- Oman at the 2024 Summer Olympics
- Oman at the Paralympics
