= Oman at the 1992 Summer Paralympics =

- IPC code: OMA
- NPC: Oman Paralympic Committee

in Barcelona
- Competitors: 4
- Medals: Gold 0 Silver 0 Bronze 0 Total 0

Summer Paralympics appearances (overview)
- 1988; 1992; 1996; 2000; 2004; 2008; 2012; 2016; 2020; 2024

Oman competed at the 1992 Summer Paralympics in Barcelona, Spain. 4 competitors from Oman won no medals and so did not place in the medal table.

== See also ==
- Oman at the Paralympics
- Oman at the 1992 Summer Olympics
