= Oman at the 2000 Summer Paralympics =

- IPC code: OMA
- NPC: Oman Paralympic Committee

in Sydney
- Competitors: 3
- Medals Ranked 69th: Gold 0 Silver 0 Bronze 0 Total 0

Summer Paralympics appearances (overview)
- 1988; 1992; 1996; 2000; 2004; 2008; 2012; 2016; 2020; 2024

Oman competed at the 2000 Summer Paralympics in Sydney, Australia. Three competitors from Oman won no medals to finish joint 69th in the medal table along with all other countries who failed to win medals.

== See also ==
- Oman at the Paralympics
- Oman at the 2000 Summer Olympics
