= Oman at the 2020 Summer Olympics =

- IOC code: OMA
- NOC: Oman Olympic Committee

in Tokyo, Japan 23 July – 8 August 2021
- Competitors: 5 in 4 sports
- Flag bearer (opening): Issa Al-Adawi
- Flag bearer (closing): N/A
- Medals: Gold 0 Silver 0 Bronze 0 Total 0

Summer Olympics appearances (overview)
- 1984; 1988; 1992; 1996; 2000; 2004; 2008; 2012; 2016; 2020; 2024

Oman competed at the 2020 Summer Olympics in Tokyo. Originally scheduled to take place during the summer of 2020, the Games were postponed to 23 July to 8 August 2021, because of the COVID-19 pandemic.

== Competitors ==
The following is a list of the number of competitors in the Games:

Sport	Men	Women	Total
Athletics	1	1	2
Shooting	1	0	1
Swimming	1	0	1
Weightlifting	1	0	1
Total	4	1	5

== Athletics ==
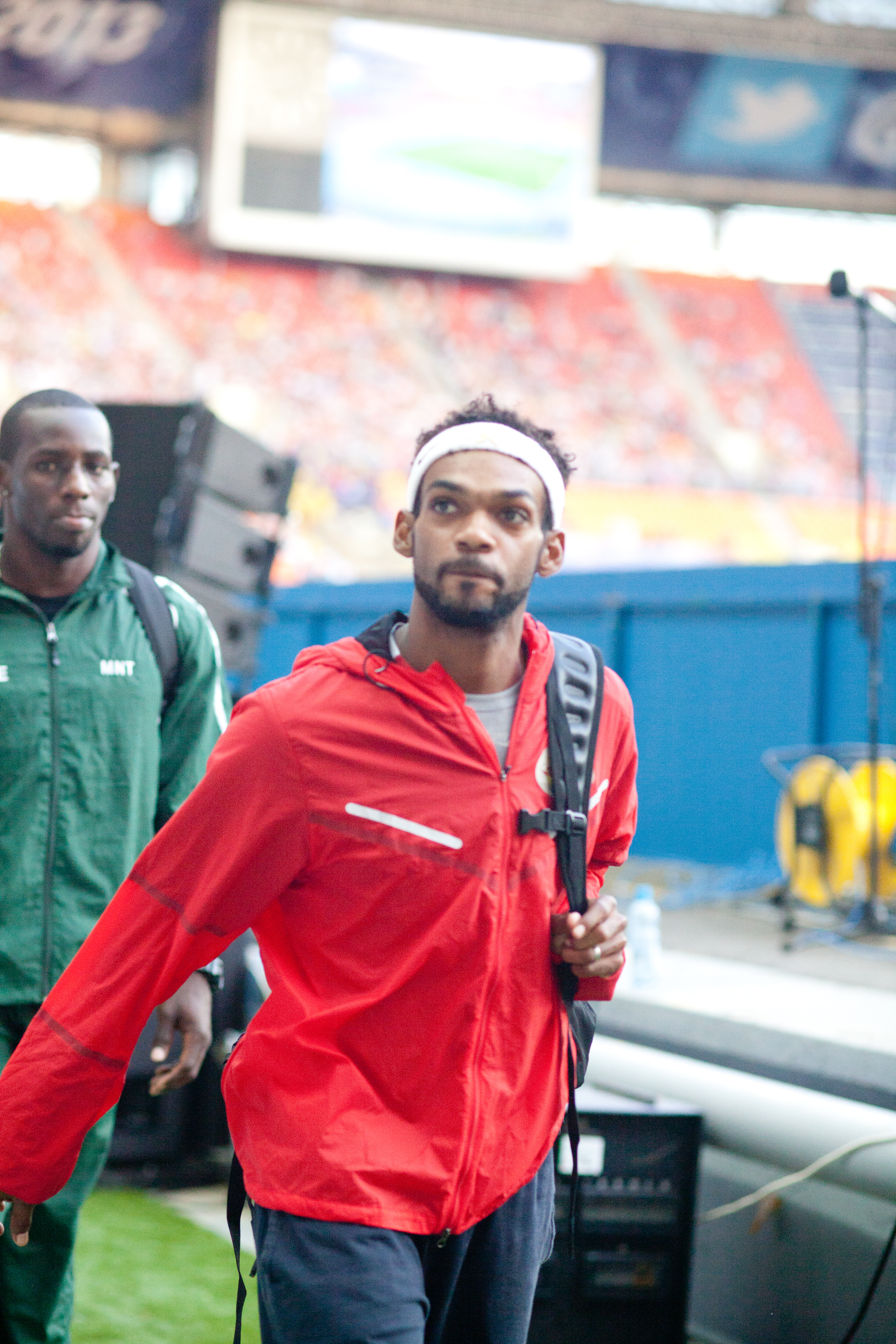
Barakat Al-Harthi

Oman received a universality slot from the World Athletics to send two track and field athletes (one per gender) to the Olympics.

Key

- Note–Ranks given for track events are within the athlete's heat only
- Q = Qualified for the next round
- q = Qualified for the next round as a fastest loser or, in field events, by position without achieving the qualifying target
- NR = National record
- N/A = Round not applicable for the event
- Bye = Athlete not required to compete in round

Track & road events

Athlete	Event	Heat		Quarterfinal		Semifinal		Final	
Athlete	Event	Result	Rank	Result	Rank	Result	Rank	Result	Rank
Barakat Al-Harthi	Men's 100 m	10.27	1 Q	10.31	7	Did not advance			
Mazoon Al-Alawi	Women's 100 m	12.35	6	Did not advance					

== Shooting ==
Oman received an invitation from the Tripartite Commission to send a men's rifle shooter to the Olympics, if he or she attained the minimum qualifying score (MQS) on or before June 5, 2021.

Athlete	Event	Qualification		Final	
Athlete	Event	Points	Rank	Points	Rank
Hamed Said Al-Khatri	Men's 50 m rifle 3 positions	1148	35	Did not advance	

== Swimming ==
Oman received a universality invitation from FINA to send one top-ranked swimmer in their respective individual events to the Olympics, based on the FINA Points System of June 28, 2021.

Athlete	Event	Heat		Semifinal		Final	
Athlete	Event	Time	Rank	Time	Rank	Time	Rank
Issa Al-Adawi	Men's 100 m freestyle	51.81	53	Did not advance			

== Weightlifting ==
Oman received an invitation from the Tripartite Commission and the IWF to send Amur Salim Al-Khanjari in the men's 81-kg category to the Olympics.

Athlete	Event	Snatch		Clean & Jerk		Total	Rank
Athlete	Event	Result	Rank	Result	Rank	Total	Rank
Amur Salim Al-Khanjari	Men's –81 kg	140	13	177	10	317	10
