= Oman at the 2016 Summer Olympics =

- Flag of Oman
- IOC code: OMA
- NOC: Oman Olympic Committee

in Rio de Janeiro
- Competitors: 4 in 2 sports
- Flag bearer: Hamed Said Al-Khatri
- Medals: Gold 0 Silver 0 Bronze 0 Total 0

Summer Olympics appearances (overview)
- 1984; 1988; 1992; 1996; 2000; 2004; 2008; 2012; 2016; 2020; 2024; 2028

Oman competed at the 2016 Summer Olympics in Rio de Janeiro, Brazil, when the event was held from 5 to 21 August 2016. This was the nation's ninth consecutive appearance at the Summer Olympics. Four Omani athletes, two men and two women, were selected to compete in athletics and shooting at the Games. Among them were sprinter Barakat Al-Harthi, the lone returning Olympian from the previous Games.

During their debuts, Mazoon Al-Alawi competed in running while Wadha Al-Balushi was the first woman to represent Oman in shooting. Rifle shooter Hamed Said Al-Khatri was the nation's flag bearer in the opening ceremony. None of the runners progressed past the heats and the shooters did not advance beyond the qualification rounds. Overall, both Al-Harthi and Al-Balushi had the highest placing for Oman with their 26th-place finishes in the men's 100 metres and women's 10 m air pistol events.

== Background ==
In 1982, the Oman Olympic Committee was created and became part of the International Olympic Committee. After appearing at the 1984 Summer Olympics, Oman competed in seven consecutive Summer Olympics leading up to the 2016 Summer Olympics. As part of his Olympic training, Barakat Al-Harthi ran in several countries including Bahrain and Bulgaria. While flying to Rio to compete at the 2016 Summer Olympics, Al-Harthi missed his layover and lost some of his sports equipment.

In the 2016 Olympics held from 5 to 21 August, Al-Harthi was competing in his second Olympics after appearing at the 2012 Summer Olympics, while runner Mazoon Al-Alawi was making her Olympic debut. The other Olympians making their first appearances for Oman were shooters Hamed Said Al-Khatri and Wadha Al-Balushi. Al-Khatri was selected as the first woman to represent Oman in shooting. Al-Khatri was the flag bearer at the opening ceremony and a volunteer carried the flag at the closing ceremony. Apart from the four Omani competitors, the country sent several coaches and sports executives to the 2016 Olympics.

== Athletics (track & field) ==
Al-Harthi qualified for the Olympics with a time of 10.16 seconds at the 2015 Military World Games. In 2016, his Olympic qualifying time of 10.05 seconds was 0.11 seconds faster than the required time to enter the men's 100 metres. On 13 August, Al-Harthi did not appear in the preliminary round and competed in the sixth race of the heats. Al-Harthi finished in third in his heat with a time of 10.22 seconds. His placing meant Al-Harthi did not qualify as one of the first two runners in his individual heat. As he also did not have one of the eight fastest times from the remaining runners, Al-Harthi did not progress to the semi-finals. Out of 84 competitors, Al-Harthi finished in a tie for 26th place overall.

Mazoon Al-Alawi entered the 2016 Olympics as a wild card. Her entry time of 12.04 seconds was 0.72 seconds slower than the Olympic qualifying time for the women's 100 metres. On 12 August, Al-Alawi finished third in the second heat of the preliminary round with a time of 12.30 seconds, which qualified her as one of the two fastest remaining runners following the top two finishers of all of the heats. In the subsequent round (held the same day) Al-Alawi came in eighth in the seventh heat. She did not automatically advance to the next round as she did not finish in the top two of her heat and, with a time of 12.43 seconds, she was slower than the next eight qualifiers and so she did not progress past the heats. Al-Alawi finished 62nd overall out of 80 runners.

Key

- Note–Ranks given for track events are within the athlete's heat only
- q = Qualified for the next round as a fastest loser
- Bye = Athlete not required to compete in round

Athlete	Event	Preliminary Round		Heats		Semifinal		Final	
Athlete	Event	Result	Rank	Result	Rank	Result	Rank	Result	Rank
Barakat Al-Harthi	Men's 100 m	Bye		10.22	3	did not advance			
Mazoon Al-Alawi	Women's 100 m	12.30	3 q	12.43	8	did not advance			

== Shooting ==
Before the Olympics, each shooter required a Quota Place and Minimum Qualification Score. With invitations from the Tripartite Commission, Quota Places were given to Hamed Said Al-Khatri and Wadha Al-Balushi. To qualify for the men's 50 metre rifle three positions event, shooters needed at least 1135 points. Al-Khatri reached his requirement by scoring 1149 points at the 2014 ISSF World Shooting Championships in this division. For the women's 10 metre air pistol Olympic event, qualifiers needed 365 points or more. During the 2015 ISSF World Cup, Al-Balushi accumulated 381 points and reached her score requirement.

At his qualification round on 14 August, Al-Khatri scored 1138 points during the 50 m rifle three positions event. While achieving 397 points in the prone position round for his highest score, Al-Khatri scored 40 ten-pointers during the three rounds, but his score was too low to make him one of the eight qualifiers for the final. Out of 44 competitors, Al-Khatri finished overall in 43rd.

On 7 August, Al-Balushi scored 379 points during qualification at the 10 m air pistol Olympic competition. While scoring five ten-pointers throughout the four rounds, Al-Balushi's highest score was 96 points in the third round. As she did not have one of the eight highest overall scores, Al-Balushi did not qualify for the final. Overall, Al-Balushi finished 26th out of 44 competitors.

Athlete	Event	Qualification		Final	
Athlete	Event	Result	Rank	Points	Rank
Hamed Said Al-Khatri	Men's 50 m rifle three positions	1138	43	did not advance	
Wadha Al-Balushi	Women's 10 m air pistol	379	26	did not advance	
