= Oman at the 1984 Summer Olympics =

- IOC code: OMA
- NOC: Oman Olympic Committee

in Los Angeles, United States 28 July–12 August 1984
- Competitors: 16
- Flag bearer: Mohamed Al-Busaidi
- Medals: Gold 0 Silver 0 Bronze 0 Total 0

Summer Olympics appearances (overview)
- 1984; 1988; 1992; 1996; 2000; 2004; 2008; 2012; 2016; 2020; 2024

Oman competed in the Olympic Games for the first time at the 1984 Summer Olympics in Los Angeles, United States.

== Competitors ==
Sport	Men	Women	Total
Athletics	7	0	7
Sailing	1	0	1
Shooting	8	0	8
Total	16	0	16

== Results by event ==
=== Athletics ===
Men's 100 metres

- Abdullah Sulaiman Al-Akbary

- Heat — 10.86 (→ did not advance)

Men's 200 metres

- Mohamed Al-Hashimi

- Heat — 22.83 (→ did not advance)

Men's 400 metres

- Mohammed Almaliki otherwise Al-Malky

- Heat — 47.61 (→ did not advance)

Men's 800 metres

- Barakat Al-Sharji otherwise Barkat Alsharji

- Heat — 2.00.38 (→ did not advance)

Men's 1,500 metres

- Amor Masoud Al-Sharji

- Qualifying Heat — 4:12.76 (→ did not advance)

Men's 3,000 metres steeplechase

- Abdullah Azzan Al-Akbary or Akbary

- Qualifying Heat — 10:22.96 (→ did not advance)

Men's Marathon

- Awadh Shaban Al-Sameer — did not finish (→ no ranking)

Men's 4x400 metres relay

- Barkat Al-Sharji, Mohamed Al-Hashimi, Abdullah Sulaiman Al-Akbary, Mohammed Al-Malky

- Heat — 3.15.87 (→ did not advance)

=== Sailing ===
Windglider

- Talib Salim Al-Maiwali; 33rd

=== Shooting ===
Men's 25 metre rapid fire pistol

- Said Al-Khatry (44th); Abdullah Al-Hussini (45th)

Men's 50 metre pistol

- Juma Al-Rahbi (47th); Ali Al-Ghafiri (56th)

Men's 10 metre air rifle

- Abdul Latif Al-Bulushi (=43rd); Khamis Al-Subhi (48th)

Men's 50 metre rifle three positions

- Abdul Latif Al-Bulushi (48th); Dadallah Al-Bulushi (50th)

Men's 50 metre rifle prone

- Dadallah Al-Bulushi (=49th); Zaher Al-Jamudi (=67th)
