= Oman at the Olympics =

- IOC code: OMA
- NOC: Oman Olympic Committee
- Medals: Gold 0 Silver 0 Bronze 0 Total 0

Summer appearances
- 1984; 1988; 1992; 1996; 2000; 2004; 2008; 2012; 2016; 2020; 2024; 2028

Oman has competed in 11 Summer Olympic Games. The nation has never competed in the Winter Olympic Games. No Omani athlete has won an Olympic medal.

The Oman Olympic Committee was formed and recognized in 1982.

At the first Summer Youth Games in Singapore in 2010, two young people, a boy and a girl, competed in athletics and equestrian sports. A medal that is not included in Oman's medal tally was won by show jumper Sultan al-Tooqi, who won the silver medal with his horse Joondooree Farms Damiro in the mixed Australasia team.

In 2014 in Nanjing, three young people, two boys and a girl, took part in athletics and beach volleyball.

== Administration ==
Within the Olympic Movement, Oman has been represented at IOC level by two sports administrators. Habib Macki served as an International Olympic Committee member from 2009 to 2013 and was the first Omani to hold that role. He was awarded the Olympic Order in 2013.

Khalid bin Mohammed Al Zubair served as president of the Oman Olympic Committee from 2013 to 2018 and was an IOC member from 2017 to 2019 as a respresentative of a National Olympic Committee.

== Best result ==
Oman's best Olympic result is Mohamed Al-Malky's eighth-place finish in the men's 400 metres at the 1988 Summer Olympics.

== Medal tables ==
=== Medals by Summer Games ===
Games	Athletes	Gold	Silver	Bronze	Total	Rank
1984 Los Angeles	16	0	0	0	0	–
1988 Seoul	13	0	0	0	0	–
1992 Barcelona	5	0	0	0	0	–
1996 Atlanta	4	0	0	0	0	–
2000 Sydney	6	0	0	0	0	–
2004 Athens	2	0	0	0	0	–
2008 Beijing	4	0	0	0	0	–
2012 London	4	0	0	0	0	–
2016 Rio de Janeiro	4	0	0	0	0	–
2020 Tokyo	5	0	0	0	0	–
2024 Paris	4	0	0	0	0	–
2028 Los Angeles	future event					
2032 Brisbane	future event					
Total		0	0	0	0	–

== See also ==
- List of flag bearers for Oman at the Olympics
- Oman at the Paralympics
- Sport in Oman
- Oman Olympic Committee
