= Oman at the 2024 Summer Olympics =

- IOC code: OMA
- NOC: Oman Olympic Committee

in Paris, France 26 July 2024 – 11 August 2024
- Competitors: 4 (3 men and 1 woman) in 3 sports
- Flag bearers: Ali Anwar Al-Balushi & Mazoon Al-Alawi
- Medals: Gold 0 Silver 0 Bronze 0 Total 0

Summer Olympics appearances (overview)
- 1984; 1988; 1992; 1996; 2000; 2004; 2008; 2012; 2016; 2020; 2024; 2028

Oman, officially the Sultanate of Oman competed at the 2024 Summer Olympics in Paris from 26 July to 11 August 2024. It was the nation's eleventh consecutive appearance at the Summer Olympics, having appeared at all Summer Games since its 1984 debut.

== Competitors ==
The following is the list of number of competitors in the Games.

Sport	Men	Women	Total
Athletics	1	1	2
Shooting	1	0	1
Swimming	1	0	1
Total	3	1	4

== Athletics ==
Omani track and field athletes achieved the entry standards for Paris 2024 by world ranking, in the following events (a maximum of 3 athletes each):

Key

- Note–Ranks given for track events are within the athlete's heat only
- Q = Qualified for the next round
- q = Qualified for the next round as the fastest loser or, in field events, by position without achieving the qualifying target
- NR = National record
- N/A = Round not applicable for the event
- Bye = Athlete not required to compete in round

Track and road events

Athlete	Event	Preliminary		Heat		Semifinal		Final	
Athlete	Event	Result	Rank	Result	Rank	Result	Rank	Result	Rank
Ali Anwar Al-Balushi	Men's 100 m	Bye		10.26	6	Did not advance			
Mazoon Al-Alawi	Women's 100 m	12.58	7	Did not advance					

== Shooting ==
Omani shooters achieved quota places for Paris 2024 based on the allocations of universality spots.

Athlete	Event	Qualification		Final	
Athlete	Event	Points	Rank	Points	Rank
Hamed Said Al-Khatri	Men's trap	114	30	Did not advance	

== Swimming ==
Oman sent one swimmer to compete at the 2024 Paris Olympics.

Athlete	Event	Heat		Semifinal		Final	
Athlete	Event	Time	Rank	Time	Rank	Time	Rank
Issa Al-Adawi	Men's 100 m freestyle	53.19	70	Did not advance			
