= Oman at the 2012 Summer Paralympics =

- IPC code: OMA
- NPC: Oman Paralympic Committee

in London
- Competitors: 2 in 2 sports
- Medals: Gold 0 Silver 0 Bronze 0 Total 0

Summer Paralympics appearances (overview)
- 1988; 1992; 1996; 2000; 2004; 2008; 2012; 2016; 2020; 2024

Oman competed at the 2012 Summer Paralympics in London, United Kingdom from August 29 to September 9, 2012.

== Athletics ==
Men’s Field Events

Athlete	Event	Distance	Points	Rank
Mohamed Al Nabhani	Discus Throw F32-34	20.94	574	19
Mohamed Al Nabhani	Javelin Throw F33-34	17.33	—	16

== Powerlifting ==
Men

Athlete	Event	Result	Rank
Issam Al Balushi	-90kg	172.0	8

== See also ==
- Oman at the 2012 Summer Olympics
