= Oman at the 2008 Summer Paralympics =

- IPC code: OMA
- NPC: Oman Paralympic Committee

in Beijing
- Competitors: 1 in 1 sport
- Medals: Gold 0 Silver 0 Bronze 0 Total 0

Summer Paralympics appearances (overview)
- 1988; 1992; 1996; 2000; 2004; 2008; 2012; 2016; 2020; 2024

Oman sent a delegation to compete at the 2008 Summer Paralympics in Beijing, People's Republic of China. According to official records, the only athlete was powerlifter Badar Al Harthy.

== Powerlifting ==
Men

Athlete	Class	Event	Result	Rank
Badar Al Harthy	-	-56 kg	142.5	11

== See also ==
- Oman at the Paralympics
- Oman at the 2008 Summer Olympics
