= Lim Ching Hwang =

Malaysian swimmer (born 1996)

Personal information
- Born: March 6, 1996 (age 30) Selangor, Malaysia

Sport
- Sport: Swimming
Medal record
Swimming
Representing Malaysia
SEA Games
| Silver medal – second place | 2017 Kuala Lumpur | 4x100m freestyle relay |
| Bronze medal – third place | 2017 Kuala Lumpur | 4x200m freestyle relay |
Asian Youth Games
| Gold medal – first place | 2013 Nanjing | 200m freestyle |

Ching Hwang Lim (born 6 March 1996) is a sportsperson currently representing Singapore, who formerly represented Malaysia, in swimming. He was born in Selangor, Malaysia. He committed to Ohio State University and holds a Malaysian record in swimming which was set in July 2016.

== Personal life and family ==
Lim Ching Hwang was born and raised in Subang Jaya, Selangor, Malaysia. He is one of two siblings and is of Overseas Chinese descent. Lim's early years of education were spent at a local primary school, SJK(C) Lick Hung.

== Career and records ==
Lim achieved Malaysia's first-ever gold medal at the 2013 Asian Youth Games in the 200m freestyle event with a time of 1:50.81.

Records
| Event | Time | Venue | Date | Record |
|---|---|---|---|---|
| 100m freestyle | 50.77s | SUKMA 2016 | 24 July 2021 | National Record |
| 200m individual medley | 2:04.77 | SUKMA 2016 | 24 July 2021 | National Record |

== Controversy ==
On 9 February 2021, Lim Ching Hwang was given eight weeks in jail for defaulting on Singaporean National Service (NS). Lim was given Singapore permanent residency status under the Foreign Sports Talent Scheme in March 2014, at the age of 18, and became subject to the requirements of the Enlistment Act. He received a registration notice in May 2014 asking him to register for NS.

However, he had pursued university studies in the United States from September 2014 onwards. Lim registered for NS in May 2014 and applied for deferment and left the country in July 2014. He returned to Singapore in June 2018 after completing his studies and enlisted in NS in April 2019 and completed it in February 2021.

Lim said he is "deeply regretful" of the actions he committed "as a boy", adding that he has "come back to face the consequences as a man".
