= Zhang Mengxue =

Chinese sports shooter

Zhang Mengxue 张梦雪
Personal information
- Nationality: Chinese
- Born: 6 February 1991 (age 35) Jinan, Shandong Province, China

Sport
- Sport: Sports shooting
Medal record
Women's shooting
Representing China
Olympic Games
Gold medal – first place	2016 Rio de Janeiro	10 metre air pistol
Asian Championships
Bronze medal – third place	2015 Kuwait City	10 m air pistol team

Zhang Mengxue (simplified Chinese: 张梦雪; traditional Chinese: 張夢雪; pinyin: Zhāng Mèngxuě, born 6 February 1991) is a Chinese female sports shooter specialising in the 10 meter air pistol shooting. She won the gold medal in the 10 metres air pistol event at 2016 Summer Olympics.

== Life ==
She trained at Jinan Sports School and Shandong Provincial Shooting Team before she was selected to join the China National Shooting Team in 2015. She won the gold medal in the women's 10 metre air pistol event at the 2016 Summer Olympics.
