= Shooting at the 2016 Summer Olympics – Men's 50 metre rifle three positions =

Men's 50 metre rifle three positions at the Games of the XXXI Olympiad
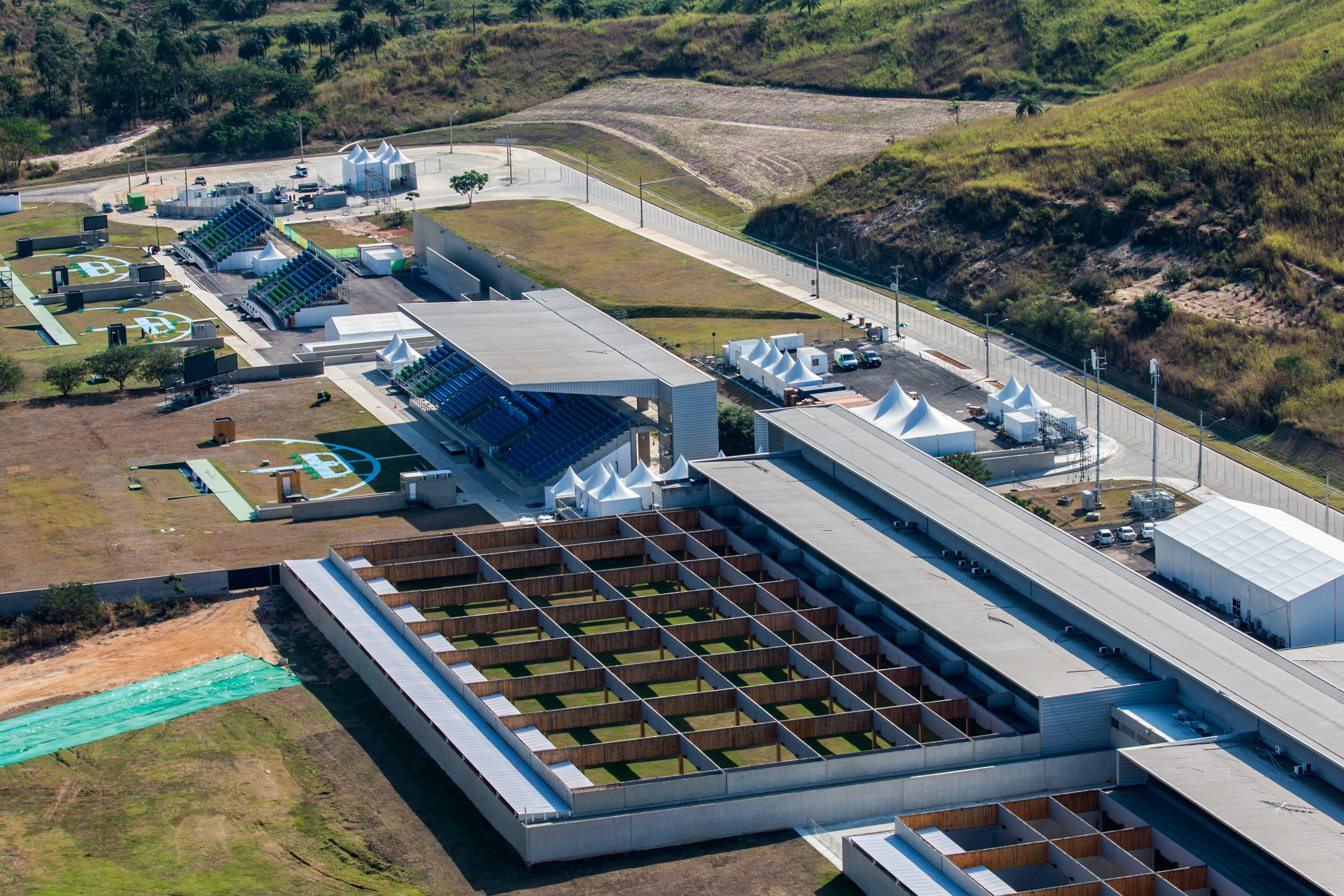
- Aerial view of the National Shooting Center in Deodoro, where the men's 50 metre rifle prone event took place.
- Venue: National Shooting Center
- Date: 14 August 2016
- Competitors: 44 from 31 nations
- Winning score: 458.8

Medalists
| 1st place, gold medalist(s) | | Niccolò Campriani | Italy |
| 2nd place, silver medalist(s) | | Sergey Kamenskiy | Russia |
| 3rd place, bronze medalist(s) | | Alexis Raynaud | France |

The men's 50 metre rifle three positions event at the 2016 Olympic Games took place on 14 August 2016 at the National Shooting Center.

The medals were presented by Danka Barteková, IOC member, Slovakia and Olegario Vázquez Raña, President of the International Shooting Sport Federation.

== Records ==
Prior to this competition, the existing world and Olympic records were as follows.

Qualification records
| World record | Nazar Louginets (RUS) | 1186 | Munich, Germany | 12 June 2014 |
| Olympic record | ISSF Rule changed on 01.01.2013 | – | – | – |

Final records
| World record | Matthew Emmons (USA) | 464.1 | Munich, Germany | 25 May 2016 |
| Olympic record | ISSF Rule changed on 01.01.2013 | – | – | – |

== Results ==
=== Qualification round ===
| Rank | Athlete | Country | Kneeling | Prone | Standing | Total | Notes |
|---|---|---|---|---|---|---|---|
| 1 | Sergey Kamenskiy | Russia | 397 | 397 | 390 | 1184-67x | Q, OR |
| 2 | Daniel Brodmeier | Germany | 392 | 397 | 388 | 1177-57x | Q |
| 3 | Ole-Kristian Bryhn | Norway | 394 | 396 | 387 | 1177-56x | Q |
| 4 | Zhu Qinan | China | 389 | 396 | 391 | 1176-65x | Q |
| 5 | Alexis Raynaud | France | 392 | 396 | 388 | 1176-63x | Q |
| 6 | Fedor Vlasov | Russia | 394 | 398 | 384 | 1176-58x | Q |
| 7 | Andre Link | Germany | 392 | 397 | 385 | 1174-62x | Q |
| 8 | Niccolò Campriani | Italy | 393 | 397 | 384 | 1174-62x | Q |
| 9 | Petar Gorša | Croatia | 389 | 397 | 388 | 1174-55x | |
| 10 | Oleh Tsarkov | Ukraine | 390 | 397 | 386 | 1173-61x | |
| 11 | Milenko Sebić | Serbia | 395 | 398 | 379 | 1172-64x | |
| 12 | István Péni | Hungary | 388 | 396 | 388 | 1172-49x | |
| 13 | Odd Arne Brekne | Norway | 392 | 396 | 383 | 1171-61x | |
| 14 | Serhiy Kulish | Ukraine | 392 | 397 | 382 | 1171-54x | |
| 15 | Hui Zicheng | China | 389 | 394 | 388 | 1171-54x | |
| 16 | Kim Jong-hyun | South Korea | 394 | 397 | 379 | 1170-61x | |
| 17 | Alexander Schmirl | Austria | 386 | 396 | 388 | 1170-60x | |
| 18 | Yury Shcherbatsevich | Belarus | 396 | 396 | 378 | 1170-57x | |
| 19 | Matthew Emmons | United States | 391 | 400 | 378 | 1169-59x | |
| 20 | Dane Sampson | Australia | 388 | 396 | 385 | 1169-58x | |
| 21 | Filip Nepejchal | Czech Republic | 388 | 394 | 387 | 1169-54x | |
| 22 | Toshikazu Yamashita | Japan | 393 | 396 | 380 | 1169-53x | |
| 23 | Chain Singh | India | 391 | 398 | 380 | 1169-52x | |
| 24 | Valérian Sauveplane | France | 385 | 393 | 390 | 1168-63x | |
| 25 | Stevan Pletikosić | Serbia | 389 | 398 | 381 | 1168-63x | |
| 26 | Pouria Norouzian | Iran | 394 | 391 | 383 | 1168-59x | |
| 27 | Marco De Nicolo | Italy | 395 | 396 | 377 | 1168-59x | |
| 28 | Daniel Lowe | United States | 392 | 394 | 382 | 1168-52x | |
| 29 | Yuriy Yurkov | Kazakhstan | 390 | 390 | 387 | 1167-54x | |
| 30 | Jan Lochbihler | Switzerland | 390 | 398 | 378 | 1166-71x | |
| 31 | Illia Charheika | Belarus | 387 | 392 | 387 | 1166-50x | |
| 32 | Kim Hyeon-jun | South Korea | 388 | 390 | 387 | 1165-53x | |
| 33 | Gagan Narang | India | 383 | 395 | 384 | 1162-50x | |
| 34 | Péter Sidi | Hungary | 386 | 390 | 386 | 1162-46x | |
| 35 | Anton Rizov | Bulgaria | 388 | 393 | 380 | 1161-55x | |
| 36 | Gernot Rumpler | Austria | 385 | 394 | 382 | 1161-48x | |
| 37 | Napis Tortungpanich | Thailand | 392 | 394 | 373 | 1159-55x | |
| 38 | Reinier Estpinan | Cuba | 384 | 396 | 377 | 1157-48x | |
| 39 | William Godward | Australia | 384 | 392 | 380 | 1156-41x | |
| 40 | Julio Iemma | Venezuela | 380 | 397 | 378 | 1155-51x | |
| 41 | Hamada Talat | Egypt | 384 | 389 | 378 | 1151-56x | |
| 42 | Alexander Molerio | Cuba | 388 | 384 | 374 | 1146-40x | |
| 43 | Hamed Said Al-Khatri | Oman | 374 | 397 | 367 | 1138-40x | |
| 44 | Cassio Rippel | Brazil | 387 | 395 | 347 | 1129-45x | |

=== Final ===
| Rank | Athlete | 1-5 | 6-10 | 11-15 | 16-20 | 21-25 | 26-30 | 31-35 | 36-40 | 41 | 42 | 43 | 44 | 45 | Final | Notes |
|---|---|---|---|---|---|---|---|---|---|---|---|---|---|---|---|---|
| 1st place, gold medalist(s) | Niccolò Campriani (ITA) | 51.4 | 51.2 | 52.5 | 52.0 | 51.8 | 51.1 | 50.2 | 50.8 | 10.3 | 8.7 | 10.5 | 9.1 | 9.2 | 458.8 | OR |
| 2nd place, silver medalist(s) | Sergey Kamenskiy (RUS) | 51.7 | 50.8 | 51.1 | 52.9 | 51.6 | 51.9 | 51.3 | 50.0 | 9.2 | 9.7 | 10.4 | 9.6 | 8.3 | 458.5 | |
| 3rd place, bronze medalist(s) | Alexis Raynaud (FRA) | 50.6 | 52.3 | 50.9 | 51.2 | 51.0 | 52.8 | 49.8 | 48.6 | 10.1 | 10.9 | 10.0 | 10.2 | — | 448.4 | |
| 4 | Daniel Brodmeier (GER) | 49.2 | 50.0 | 51.2 | 52.5 | 52.0 | 52.5 | 50.0 | 49.6 | 9.5 | 9.6 | 9.5 | — | | 435.6 | |
| 5 | Andre Link (GER) | 51.0 | 50.7 | 49.8 | 52.4 | 52.6 | 52.1 | 51.0 | 45.6 | 10.0 | 9.4 | — | | | 424.6 | |
| 6 | Zhu Qinan (CHN) | 50.5 | 49.3 | 50.2 | 51.2 | 51.8 | 52.3 | 50.8 | 48.9 | 9.8 | — | | | | 414.8 | |
| 7 | Fedor Vlasov (RUS) | 51.5 | 50.9 | 51.8 | 51.9 | 51.4 | 52.1 | 44.8 | 48.7 | — | | | | | 403.1 | |
| 8 | Ole-Kristian Bryhn (NOR) | 49.0 | 51.4 | 50.3 | 51.7 | 51.5 | 51.9 | 46.9 | 47.7 | — | | | | | 400.4 | |
