= Oman at the 2012 Summer Olympics =

- IOC code: OMA
- NOC: Oman Olympic Committee

in London
- Competitors: 4 in 2 sports
- Flag bearer: Ahmed Al-Hatmi
- Medals: Gold 0 Silver 0 Bronze 0 Total 0

Summer Olympics appearances (overview)
- 1984; 1988; 1992; 1996; 2000; 2004; 2008; 2012; 2016; 2020; 2024

Oman competed at the 2012 Summer Olympics in London, from 27 July to 12 August 2012. This was the nation's eighth consecutive appearance at the Olympics.

Four athletes from Oman were selected, competing only in athletics and shooting. This was also the nation's smallest delegation sent to the Olympics since the 2004 Summer Olympics in Athens, Greece.

== Background ==
The Oman Olympic Committee was formed in 1982 and Oman made their Olympic debut at the 1984 Summer Olympics in Los Angeles, California, United States. They have appeared at every Summer Olympics since and the 2012 Summer Olympics in London, England, United Kingdom marked Oman's eighth appearance at the Summer Olympics. The four athletes present was their joint-second smallest delegation ever, only the delegation at the 2004 Summer Olympics in Athens, Greece had been smaller.

== Competitors ==
In total, four athletes represented Oman at the 2012 Summer Olympics in London, England, United Kingdom across two different sports.

Sport	Men	Women	Total
Athletics	2	1	3
Shooting	1	0	1
Total	3	1	4

== Athletics ==
In total, three Omani athletes participated in the athletics events – Shinoona Salah Al-Habsi in the women's 100 m, Barakat Mubarak Al-Harthi in the men's 100 m and Ahmed Mohamed Al-Merjabi in the men's 400 m.

The athletics events took place at the Olympic Stadium in the Queen Elizabeth Olympic Park in Stratford, London from 3 to 12 August 2012.

Men

Athlete	Event	Heat		Quarterfinal		Semifinal		Final	
Athlete	Event	Result	Rank	Result	Rank	Result	Rank	Result	Rank
Barakat Mubarak Al-Harthi	100 m	Bye		10.41	7	did not advance			
Ahmed Mohamed Al-Merjabi	400 m	DNS		—		did not advance			

Women

Athlete	Event	Heat		Quarterfinal		Semifinal		Final	
Athlete	Event	Result	Rank	Result	Rank	Result	Rank	Result	Rank
Shinoona Salah Al-Habsi	100 m	12.45	4	did not advance					

== Shooting ==
In total, one Omani athlete participated in the shooting events – Ahmed Al-Hatmi in the men's double trap.

The shooting events took place at the Royal Artillery Barracks in Woolwich, London from 28 July to 6 August 2012.

Athlete	Event	Qualification		Final	
Athlete	Event	Points	Rank	Points	Rank
Ahmed Al-Hatmi	Double trap	129	19	did not advance	
