= Andre Link =

German sports shooter (born 1994)

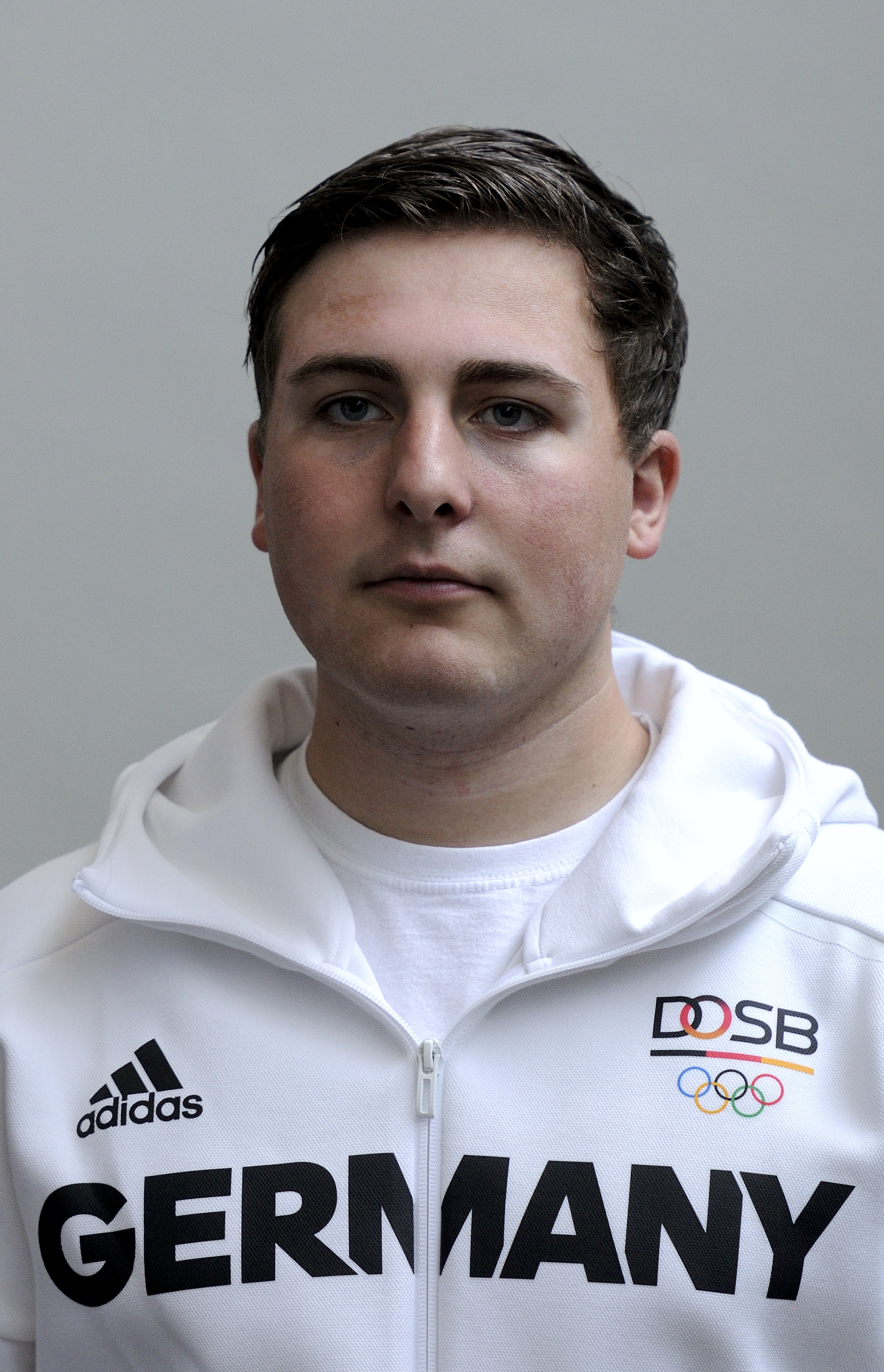

Personal information
- Nationality: German
- Born: 13 December 1994 (age 31) Bietigheim-Bissingen, Germany
- Height: 174 cm (5 ft 9 in)
- Weight: 80 kg (176 lb)

Sport
- Sport: Sports shooting

Andre Link (born 13 December 1994) is a German sports shooter. He competed in the men's 50 metre rifle three positions event at the 2016 Summer Olympics where he placed 5th.
