= Oman at the 2004 Summer Paralympics =

- IPC code: OMA
- NPC: Oman Paralympic Committee

in Athens
- Competitors: 2 in 1 sport
- Medals: Gold 0 Silver 0 Bronze 0 Total 0

Summer Paralympics appearances (overview)
- 1988; 1992; 1996; 2000; 2004; 2008; 2012; 2016; 2020; 2024

Oman competed at the 2004 Summer Paralympics in Athens, Greece. The team included two athletes, both of them men. The team did not win any medals.

== Sports ==
=== Powerlifting ===
==== Men ====
| Athlete | Event | Result | Rank |
|---|---|---|---|
| Khalid Gul Albulushi | 60kg | 120.0 | 13 |
| Badar Hamood Saif Al-Harthy | 56kg | 125.0 | 10 |

== See also ==
- Oman at the Paralympics
- Oman at the 2004 Summer Olympics
