= Oman at the 1988 Summer Olympics =

- IOC code: OMA
- NOC: Oman Olympic Committee

in Seoul, South Korea 17 September–2 October 1988
- Competitors: 8 in 3 sports
- Flag bearer: Abdul Latif Al-Bulushi
- Medals: Gold 0 Silver 0 Bronze 0 Total 0

Summer Olympics appearances (overview)
- 1984; 1988; 1992; 1996; 2000; 2004; 2008; 2012; 2016; 2020; 2024

Oman competed at the 1988 Summer Olympics in Seoul, South Korea.

== Competitors ==
The following is the list of number of competitors in the Games.

Sport	Men	Women	Total
Athletics	5	0	5
Boxing	2	–	2
Shooting	1	0	1
Total	8	0	8

== Athletics ==
=== Men ===
==== Track events ====
Athlete	Events	Heat		Round 2		Semifinal		Final	
Athlete	Events	Time	Position	Time	Position	Time	Position	Time	Position
Mansoor Al-Bulushi	800m	1:51.03	7	Did not advance					
Sulaiman Al-Habsi (Note: Sulaiman Juma Obaid Al-Habsi (Arabic: سليمان بن جمعة بن عبيد / سليمان جمعة عبيد الحبسي; born 1 February 1970) competed in two events, finishing sixth in his heat in the 400m while being the lead-off man for the 4x400m relay team which placed seventh in its heat. His personal best in the 400m, 47.9 seconds, came at another meeting that year.)	400m	48.30	5	Did not advance					
Abdullah Al-Khalidi	100m	10.90	5	Did not advance					
Abdullah Al-Lhalidi	200m	21.82	49	Did not advance					
Mohamed Amer Al-Malki	400m	46.79	1 Q	45.02	3 Q	44.69	3 Q	45.03	8
Mansoor Al-Bulushi; Sulaiman Al-Habsi; Abdullah Al-Khalidi; Mohamed Amer Al-Malki	4 × 400 m	3:12.89	20			Did not advance			
Awadh Shaban Al-Sameer	Marathon							2:46:59	83

== Boxing ==
Athlete	Event	Round of 64	Round of 32	Round of 16	Quarterfinals	Semifinals	Final
Athlete	Event	Opposition Result	Opposition Result	Opposition Result	Opposition Result	Opposition Result	Opposition Result
Abdullah Al-Barwani	Welterweight		Obah (AUS); RSCO RD3	Did not advance			
Handhal Al-Harithy	Light Welterweight	Myberg (SWE); RSCH RD1	Did not advance				

== Shooting ==
Men

Athlete	Event	Qualification		Final		Rank
Athlete	Event	Score	Rank	Score	Total	Rank
Abdul Latif Al-Bulushi	10m Air Rifle	587	17	Did not advance		17
