= Im Da-sol =

South Korean swimmer

Personal information
- Full name: Im Da-sol
- Nationality: South Korea
- Born: 21 January 1998 (age 28)

Sport
- Sport: Swimming
- Strokes: Backstroke
Medal record
Women's swimming
Representing South Korea
Asian Youth Games
Gold medal – first place	2013 Nanjing	100 m backstroke
Gold medal – first place	2013 Nanjing	4×100 m freestyle
Gold medal – first place	2013 Nanjing	4×100 m medley
Silver medal – second place	2013 Nanjing	50 m backstroke
Silver medal – second place	2013 Nanjing	200 m backstroke

Im Da-sol (born 21 January 1998) is a South Korean swimmer. She competed in the women's 100 m backstroke event at the 2017 World Aquatics Championships.
