= Oman at the 2000 Summer Olympics =

- IOC code: OMA
- NOC: Oman Olympic Committee

in Sydney
- Competitors: 6 in 2 sports
- Flag bearer: Mohammed Al-Malki
- Medals: Gold 0 Silver 0 Bronze 0 Total 0

Summer Olympics appearances (overview)
- 1984; 1988; 1992; 1996; 2000; 2004; 2008; 2012; 2016; 2020; 2024

Oman competed at the 2000 Summer Olympics in Sydney, Australia.

== Athletics ==
Key

- Q = Qualified for the next round by position in race or, in field events, by achieving the automatic qualification target
- q = Qualified for the next round as a fastest loser or, in field events, by position without achieving the qualifying target

Track and road events

Athlete	Event	Heat		Quarterfinal		Semifinal		Final	
Athlete	Event	Time	Rank	Time	Rank	Time	Rank	Time	Rank
Mohammed Al-Hooti	Men's 200 m	21.19	48	Did not advance					
Mohamed Al-Maskary; Hamoud Al-Dalhami; Mohammed Al-Hooti; Jahad Al-Sheikh	Men's 4 × 100 m relay	39.82	28	—N/a		Did not advance			

== Shooting ==
Athlete	Event	Qualification		Final		Total	
Athlete	Event	Points	Rank	Points	Rank	Points	Rank
Hilal Al Rasheedi	Men's 50 m rifle prone	592	25	Did not advance			
Hilal Al Rasheedi	Men's 10 m air rifle	579	44	Did not advance			

== Swimming ==
Athlete	Event	Heat		Semifinal		Final	
Athlete	Event	Time	Rank	Time	Rank	Time	Rank
Khalid Al-Kulaibi	Men's 50 m freestyle	26.96	68	Did not advance			

== Sources ==
- Wallenstein, David (2004). The Complete Book of the Summer Olympics (Athens 2004 Edition). Toronto, Canada. ISBN 1-894963-32-6.
- International Olympic Committee (2001). The Results. Retrieved 12 November 2005.
- Sydney Organizing Committee for the Olympic Games (2001). Official Report of the XXVII Olympiad Volume 1: Preparing for the Games. Retrieved 20 November 2005.
- Sydney Organizing Committee for the Olympic Games (2001). Official Report of the XXVII Olympiad Volume 2: Celebrating the Games. Retrieved 20 November 2005.
- Sydney Organizing Committee for the Olympic Games (2001). The Results. Retrieved 20 November 2005.
- International Olympic Committee Web Site
