= Shooting at the 2016 Summer Olympics – Women's 10 metre air pistol =

Women's 10 metre air pistol at the Games of the XXXI Olympiad
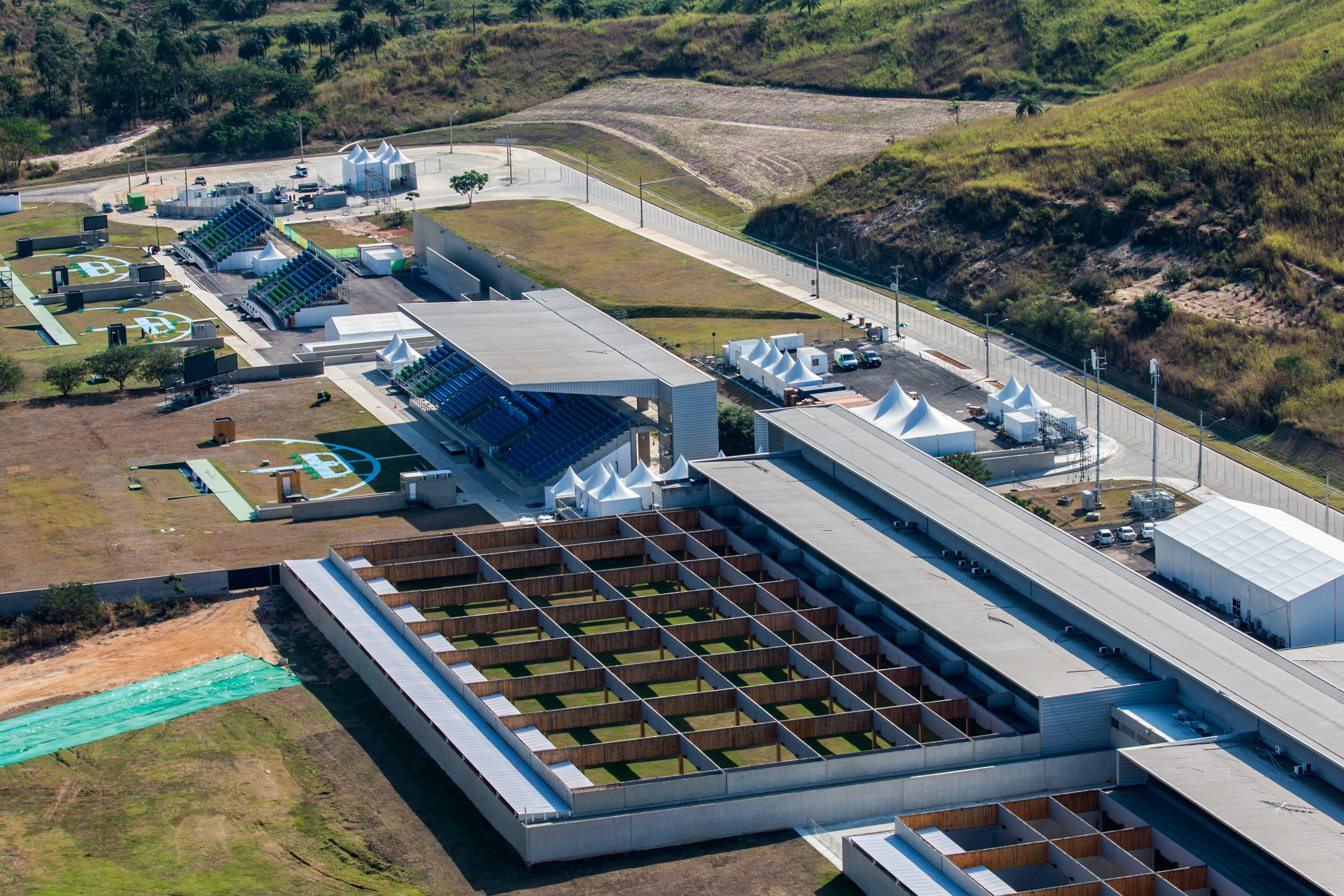
- Aerial view of the National Shooting Center in Deodoro, where the Women's 10 metre air pistol took place.
- Venue: National Shooting Center
- Date: 7 August 2016
- Competitors: 44 from 33 nations
- Winning score: 199.4 OR

Medalists
1st place, gold medalist(s)		Zhang Mengxue	China
2nd place, silver medalist(s)		Vitalina Batsarashkina	Russia
3rd place, bronze medalist(s)		Anna Korakaki	Greece

The Women's 10 metre air pistol event at the 2016 Olympic Games took place on 7 August 2016 at the National Shooting Center.

The event consisted of two rounds: a qualifier and a final. In the qualifier, each shooter fired 40 shots with an air pistol at 10 metres distance. Scores for each shot were in increments of 1, with a maximum score of 10.

The top 8 shooters in the qualifying round moved on to the final round. There, they fired an additional 20 shots. These shots scored in increments of .1, with a maximum score of 10.9.

The medals were presented by Barbara Kendall, IOC member, New Zealand and Gary Anderson, Vice President of the International Shooting Sport Federation.

== Records ==
Prior to this competition, the existing world and Olympic records were as follows.

Qualification records
World record	Svetlana Smirnova (RUS)	393	Munich, Germany	23 May 1998
Olympic record	Natalia Paderina (RUS)	391	Beijing, China	10 August 2008

Final records
World record	Heena Sidhu (IND)	203.8	Munich, Germany	10 November 2015
Olympic record	ISSF Rule changed on January 1, 2013	—	—	—

== Qualification round ==
Rank	Athlete	Country	1	2	3	4	Total	Inner 10s	Shoot Off	Notes
1	Vitalina Batsarashkina	Russia	98	98	95	99	390	14		Q
2	Ekaterina Korshunova	Russia	97	96	98	96	387	14		Q
3	Anna Korakaki	Greece	94	99	96	98	387	12		Q
4	Alejandra Zavala	Mexico	97	97	95	98	387	10		Q
5	Afaf El-Hodhod	Egypt	97	96	96	97	386	9		Q
6	Bobana Veličković	Serbia	98	93	98	96	385	12		Q
7	Zhang Mengxue	China	97	96	95	96	384	12		Q
8	Sonia Franquet	Spain	97	98	93	96	384	7		Q
9	Olfa Charni	Tunisia	97	96	95	96	384	6		
10	Céline Goberville	France	95	98	96	94	383	11		
11	Zorana Arunović	Serbia	93	96	98	95	382	16		
12	Jo Yong-suk	North Korea	95	96	96	94	381	12		
13	Stéphanie Tirode	France	94	95	96	96	381	8		
14	Heena Sidhu	India	94	95	96	95	380	13		
15	Kwak Jung-hye	South Korea	94	94	98	94	380	12		
16	Viktoria Chaika	Belarus	94	97	92	97	380	11		
17	Renata Tobai Sike	Hungary	92	97	97	94	380	10		
18	Kim Min-jung	South Korea	97	95	93	95	380	9		
19	Wu Chia-ying	Chinese Taipei	94	95	96	95	380	8		
20	Otryadyn Gündegmaa	Mongolia	94	95	95	95	379	14		
21	Golnoush Sebghatollahi	Iran	98	91	94	96	379	13		
22	Eleanor Bezzina	Malta	95	94	95	95	379	10		
23	Klaudia Breś	Poland	95	94	97	93	379	10		
24	Lalita Yauhleuskaya	Australia	97	93	95	94	379	9		
25	Monika Karsch	Germany	96	94	95	94	379	6		
26	Wadha Al Balushi	Oman	95	95	96	93	379	5		
27	Tanyaporn Prucksakorn	Thailand	96	94	94	94	378	13		
28	Olena Kostevych	Ukraine	94	98	91	95	378	12		
29	Lydia Paterson	United States	94	95	95	94	378	12		
30	Guo Wenjun	China	94	94	94	96	378	11		
31	Yu Ai-wen	Chinese Taipei	94	93	94	97	378	10		
32	Tsogbadrakhyn Mönkhzul	Mongolia	94	93	97	94	378	6		
33	Marija Marović	Croatia	92	95	94	96	377	11		
34	Nino Salukvadze	Georgia	96	93	93	95	377	9		
35	Heidi Diethelm Gerber	Switzerland	95	92	93	96	376	11		
36	Viktoria Egri	Hungary	93	93	99	91	376	7		
37	Teo Shun Xie	Singapore	93	95	91	96	375	9		
38	Lynda Kiejko	Canada	91	97	91	95	374	9		
39	Pim-on Klaisuban	Thailand	92	94	95	92	373	6		
40	Enkelejda Shehu	United States	92	93	94	93	372	5		
41	Antoaneta Boneva	Bulgaria	92	89	95	95	371	8		
42	Akiko Sato	Japan	91	93	92	93	369	5		
43	Elena Galiabovitch	Australia	91	93	90	95	369	4		
44	Lilian Castro	El Salvador	92	93	89	92	366	5		

== Final ==
Rank	Athlete	1	2	3	4	5	6	7	8	9	10	11	12	13	14	15	16	17	18	19	20	Final	Notes
1st place, gold medalist(s)	Zhang Mengxue; China	9.6	9.3	9.3	9.1	10.8	10.4	10.2	10.3	9.8	10.1	10.6	10.3	10.0	9.1	9.9	10.3	10.9	9.9	10.3	9.2	199.4	OR
2nd place, silver medalist(s)	Vitalina Batsarashkina; Russia	8.5	10.9	10.1	10.3	10.0	9.7	9.7	9.6	9.3	10.1	9.8	10.1	10.3	9.5	10.1	9.3	10.1	10.5	9.5	9.7	197.1	
3rd place, bronze medalist(s)	Anna Korakaki; Greece	10.5	9.1	10.3	10.8	9.8	9.2	9.6	9.7	9.8	9.2	9.6	9.5	10.6	10.4	10.0	10.2	9.5	9.9	—		177.7	
4	Alejandra Zavala; Mexico	9.8	10.5	8.6	9.2	9.5	10.5	9.6	10.7	10.6	10.1	9.4	10.1	9.8	8.9	10.1	9.7	—				157.1	
5	Afaf El-Hodhod; Egypt	10.9	9.0	10.1	10.1	9.3	9.9	9.3	10.0	10.6	8.8	9.5	9.9	8.9	10.8	—						137.1	
6	Sonia Franquet; Spain	9.6	10.8	9.8	9.8	10.1	9.7	9.1	9.6	8.8	9.7	9.7	9.8	—								116.5	
7	Bobana Veličković; Serbia	9.9	8.0	9.3	10.3	8.9	8.6	9.7	10.9	10.2	10.6	—										96.4	
8	Ekaterina Korshunova; Russia	10.0	10.4	8.9	9.9	7.9	8.6	8.4	9.4	—												73.5	
