= Oman at the 1996 Summer Olympics =

- IOC code: OMA
- NOC: Oman Olympic Committee

in Atlanta
- Competitors: 4 in 4 sports
- Flag bearer: Khalifa Al-Khatry
- Medals: Gold 0 Silver 0 Bronze 0 Total 0

Summer Olympics appearances (overview)
- 1984; 1988; 1992; 1996; 2000; 2004; 2008; 2012; 2016; 2020; 2024

Oman competed at the 1996 Summer Olympics in Atlanta, United States. They did not win any medals.
