= Oman at the 2008 Summer Olympics =

- IOC code: OMA
- NOC: Oman Olympic Committee

in Beijing
- Competitors: 4 in 3 sports
- Flag bearer: Dadallah Al-Bulushi
- Medals: Gold 0 Silver 0 Bronze 0 Total 0

Summer Olympics appearances (overview)
- 1984; 1988; 1992; 1996; 2000; 2004; 2008; 2012; 2016; 2020; 2024; 2028

Oman competed at the 2008 Summer Olympics in Beijing, China.

The country sent a female athlete to the Olympic Games for the first time. Buthaina Yaqoubi represented Oman in the women's 100m sprint.

== Athletics ==
Men

Athlete	Event	Heat		Quarterfinal		Semifinal		Final	
Athlete	Event	Result	Rank	Result	Rank	Result	Rank	Result	Rank
Abdullah Al Sooli	100 m	10.53	5	did not advance					

Women

Athlete	Event	Heat		Quarterfinal		Semifinal		Final	
Athlete	Event	Result	Rank	Result	Rank	Result	Rank	Result	Rank
Buthaina Yaqoubi	100 m	13.90	5	did not advance					

Key

- Note–Ranks given for track events are within the athlete's heat only
- Q = Qualified for the next round
- q = Qualified for the next round as a fastest loser or, in field events, by position without achieving the qualifying target
- NR = National record
- N/A = Round not applicable for the event
- Bye = Athlete not required to compete in round

== Shooting ==
Men

Athlete	Event	Qualification		Final	
Athlete	Event	Points	Rank	Points	Rank
Dadallah Al-Bulushi	50 m rifle prone	582	51	did not advance	

== Swimming ==
Oman was represented by one swimmer.

Athlete	Event	Heat		Semifinal		Final	
Athlete	Event	Time	Rank	Time	Rank	Time	Rank
Mohammed Al-Habsi	100 m breaststroke	1:12.28	62	did not advance			
