= Won Young-jun =

South Korean swimmer (born 1998)

Personal information
- Born: 8 January 1998 (age 28)

Korean name
- Hangul: 원영준
- RR: Won Yeongjun
- MR: Wŏn Yŏngjun

Sport
- Sport: Swimming

Won Young-jun (Korean: 원영준; born 8 January 1998) is a South Korean swimmer. He competed in the men's 100 metre backstroke event at the 2016 Summer Olympics.
