= Wadha Al-Balushi =

Omani sports shooter

Personal information
- Born: 30 November 1989 (age 36) Rustaq, Oman

Sport
- Sport: Sports shooting

Wadha Al-Balushi (born 30 November 1989) is an Omani sports shooter. She competed in the women's 10 metre air pistol event at the 2016 Summer Olympics, where she finished 26th with a score of 379. She did not advance to the final.
