= Oman at the 1992 Summer Olympics =

- IOC code: OMA
- NOC: Oman Olympic Committee

in Barcelona
- Competitors: 5 in 2 sports
- Medals: Gold 0 Silver 0 Bronze 0 Total 0

Summer Olympics appearances (overview)
- 1984; 1988; 1992; 1996; 2000; 2004; 2008; 2012; 2016; 2020; 2024

Oman competed at the 1992 Summer Olympics in Barcelona, Spain.

== Competitors ==
The following is the list of number of competitors in the Games.

Sport	Men	Women	Total
Athletics	4	0	4
Shooting	1	0	1
Total	5	0	5

== Results by event ==
=== Athletics ===
Men's 100m metres

- Ahmed Al-Moamari

- Heat — 11.58 (→ did not advance, 77th place)

Men's 800m metres

- Abdullah Mohamed Al-Anbari

- Heat — 1:50.72 (→ did not advance)
