= Ahmed Al-Hatmi =

Omani sport shooter

Medal record

Men's shooting

Representing Oman

Asian Championships
| Gold medal – first place | 2018 Kuwait City | Double trap team |
| Bronze medal – third place | 2018 Kuwait City | Double trap |
| Bronze medal – third place | 2019 Doha | Double trap team |

Ahmed Al-Hatmi (born September 27, 1984, in Rustaq) is an Omani Double trap shooter. He competed at the 2012 Summer Olympics. He was the flag bearer of Oman at the 2012 Summer Olympics.
