= Mohammed Al Mashaykhi =

Omani Paralympic athlete

Personal information
- Nationality: Omani
- Born: 7 March 1991 (age 35)

Sport
- Sport: Paralympic athletics
- Disability class: F32
- Event(s): shot put club throw
- Coached by: Sonia Mustafa
Medal record
Men's para-athletics
Representing Oman
Paralympic Games
Bronze medal – third place	2020 Tokyo	Shot put F32
World Championships
Silver medal – second place	2017 London	Shot put F32

Mohammed Al Mashaykhi (born 7 March 1991) is an Omani para-athlete who specializes in throwing events. At the 2020 Summer Paralympics, Al Mashaykhi won a bronze medal in the shot put F32 event. This made him the first Omani to win a medal at the Paralympics. He also won a silver medal at the 2017 World Para Athletics Championships in the same category.
