= Oman at the Paralympics =

- IPC code: OMA
- NPC: Oman Paralympic Committee
- Medals: Gold 0 Silver 0 Bronze 1 Total 1

Summer appearances
- 1988; 1992; 1996; 2000; 2004; 2008; 2012; 2016; 2020; 2024

Oman made its Paralympic Games début at the 1988 Summer Paralympics in Seoul, with competitors taking part in track and field, table tennis, weightlifting and wheelchair fencing. The country has participated in every subsequent edition of the Summer Paralympics, but has never entered the Winter Paralympics. Oman's largest delegation was in 1988 with seven athletes. Only male athletes competed until 2016 when Raya Al’Abri competed in women's javelin. Oman won its first medal at the 2020 Summer Paralympics when Mohammed al-Mashaykhi won bronze in the Men's shot put F32.

== See also ==
- Oman at the Olympics
