= Hamed Al-Khatri =

Omani sport shooter (born 1985)

Hamed Said Al-Khatri (born May 24, 1985) is an Omani sport shooter. He competed at the 2016 Summer Olympics in the men's 50 metre rifle three positions event, in which he placed 43rd. He was the flag bearer for Oman at the Parade of Nations and won the Arab Shooting Championship in Egypt in 2020.
