= Issa Al-Adawi =

Omani swimmer (born 1999)

Personal information
- Full name: Issa Samir Hamed Al-Adawi
- Nationality: Omani
- Born: 20 March 1999 (age 27) Oman

Sport
- Sport: Swimming

Issa bin Samir Hamed Al-Adawi (born 20 March 1999) is an Omani swimmer. He competed in the men's 100 metre freestyle at the 2020 Summer Olympics.

Al-Adawi was born in Oman to an Omani father and a Japanese mother.
