= Mohammed Al-Malki =

Omani sprinter

Personal information
- Born: 1 December 1962 (age 63)
Medal record
Men's athletics
Representing Oman
Asian Games
Gold medal – first place	1990 Beijing	400 m
Bronze medal – third place	1986 Seoul	400 m
Asian Championships
Gold medal – first place	1987 Singapore	400 m
Silver medal – second place	1985 Jakarta	400 m
Silver medal – second place	1989 New Delhi	400 m

Mohamed Amer Al-Rashed Al-Malky (Arabic: محمد عامر الراشد المالكى; born 1 December 1962) is a retired athlete from Oman who specialized in the 400 metres. He competed at the Olympic Games in 1984, 1988 1992, and 2000, an eighth place from 1988 being his best result.

His personal best time was 44.56 seconds, achieved in August 1988 in Budapest. He is the current national record holder for Oman.
