= Oman Olympic Committee =

National Olympic Committee

- Country: Oman
- Code: OMA
- Created: 1982
- Recognized: 1982
- Continental Association: OCA
- President: His Highness Sayyid Azzan bin Qais Al-Said
- Secretary General: Abdullah Mohamed Ba Makhalif
- Website: ooc.om

The Oman Olympic Committee (Arabic: اللجنة الأولمبية العمانية; IOC code: OMA) is the National Olympic Committee representing Oman. It is responsible for representing Oman in the Olympic Games and other multi-sport events organized under the Olympic Movement, and for coordinating with national sports associations in the country.

The committee was formed in 1982 and was recognized by the International Olympic Committee on 28 May 1982 during the IOC Session in Rome. Oman made its Olympic debut at the 1984 Summer Olympics in Los Angeles and has competed at every Summer Olympic Games since, but has not competed at the Winter Olympic Games. As of 2026, Oman has not won an Olympic medal. Its best Olympic result remains Mohamed Al-Malky's eighth-place finish in the men's 400 metres at the 1988 Summer Olympics.

== History ==
The Oman Olympic Committee was established in 1982. The committee became a member of the International Olympic Committee (IOC), the Association of National Olympic Committees (ANOC), the Olympic Council of Asia (OCA), and the Union of Arab National Olympic Committees in the same year. It later joined the Islamic Solidarity Sports Federation and the GCC Sports Games Organizing Committees in 1985.

The IOC recognized Oman's National Olympic Committee on 28 May 1982 during the IOC Session in Rome. Oman made its Olympic debut at the 1984 Summer Olympics in Los Angeles, where it was represented in shooting, athletics, and sailing. Since then, Oman has competed at every Summer Olympic Games, but has not competed at the Winter Olympic Games.

Under its statutes, the committee is a private sports organization of public interest with legal personality and administrative and financial independence, based in the Governorate of Muscat. Its functions include representing Oman at the Olympic Games and other multi-sport competitions, coordinating with national sports associations, supporting Olympic education, preparing sports leaders, promoting women's participation in sport, and implementing anti-doping responsibilities under the World Anti-Doping Code.

== Governance ==
Under its statutes, the Oman Olympic Committee consists of a General Assembly, Board of Directors, General Secretariat, and committees for dispute resolution and arbitration in sport. In April 2025, Sayyid Azzan bin Qais Al Said was elected chairman of the committee for the 2024–2028 term at the OOC General Assembly in Muscat.

== Presidents and chairmen ==
Name	Position	Term	Notes
Khalid bin Mohammed Al Zubair	President	2013–2018	Served as president of the Oman Olympic Committee and was an IOC member from 2017 to 2019.
Khalid bin Mohammed Al Zubair	Chairman	2022–2024	Elected chairman in 2022; OCA reported that he was heading the committee's board in 2024.
Sayyid Azzan bin Qais Al Said	President / Chairman	2024–2028	Elected at the OOC General Assembly in Muscat in April 2025.

== See also ==
- Oman at the Olympics
- Oman at the Paralympics
