= 2026–27 in Vietnamese football =

Football in Vietnam
- Season: 2026–27

Men's football
- Vietnamese Super Cup: Cong An Hanoi

The 2026–27 season is the 130th season of competitive football in Vietnam.

== Promotion and relegation ==
=== Pre-season ===
League	Promoted to league	Relegated from league
V.League 1	Truong Tuoi Dong Nai; Bac Ninh	Becamex Ho Chi Minh City; PVF-CAND
V.League 2	Thai Nguyen; Hue; Lam Dong	Ho Chi Minh City Youth
Vietnamese Second Division		
Vietnamese Third Division	N/A	

== National teams ==
Win Draw Loss

=== Vietnam national football team ===
==== Kits ====
Home	Away

==== 2026 FIFA ASEAN Cup ====
===== 2026 FIFA ASEAN Cup Premier Division Group B =====
Pos	Team	Pld	W	D	L	GF	GA	GD	Pts	Qualification
1	Thailand	3	2	0	1	7	2	+5	6 (Note: Head-to-head result: Thailand 2–0 Vietnam.)	Advance to final
2	Vietnam	3	2	0	1	5	4	+1	6	Advance to bronze final
3	Philippines	3	1	1	1	4	4	0	4	
4	Pakistan	3	0	1	2	4	10	−6	1	

Source: FIFA

===== 2026 FIFA ASEAN Cup fixtures and results =====
26 September 2026 Group B	Vietnam	1–0	Philippines	Bandung, Indonesia
20:02 UTC+7 (Note: The Vietnam v Philippines match, originally scheduled for 19:30 UTC+7, was delayed for 32 minutes due to weather conditions.)	Nguyễn Đình Bắc 25'	Report		Stadium: Si Jalak Harupat Stadium; Referee: Thoriq Alkatiri (Indonesia

29 September 2026 Group B	Thailand	2–0	Vietnam	Bandung, Indonesia
18:30 UTC+7	Sarach 10'; Chaiyaphon 90+2'	Report		Stadium: Si Jalak Harupat Stadium; Referee: Ben Abraham (Australia)

2 October 2026 Group B	Vietnam	4–2	Pakistan	Jakarta, Indonesia
15:00 UTC+7	Nguyễn Hai Long 51'; Nguyễn Hoàng Đức 57'; Nguyễn Đình Bắc 80'; Williams 90+1'	Report	Mohib 31'; A. Khan 88'	Stadium: Gelora Bung Karno Stadium; Referee: Muhammad Taqi (Singapore)

5 October 2026 Bronze final	Malaysia	1–0	Vietnam	Jakarta, Indonesia
15:00 UTC+7	Tierney 62'	Report		Stadium: Gelora Bung Karno Stadium; Referee: Ko Hyung-jin (South Korea)

==== Friendly matches ====
30 December 2026	Japan	v	Vietnam	Osaka, Japan
--:-- UTC+9 (--:-- UTC+7)				Stadium: Suita City Football Stadium

5 January 2027	Qatar	v	Vietnam	Qatar
--:-- UTC+7

==== Friendly tournaments ====
===== 2026 Casper Cup =====
Pos	Team	Pld	W	D	L	GF	GA	GD	Pts	
1	Kyrgyzstan	2	2	0	0	5	1	+4	6	Champions
2	Vietnam (H)	2	1	0	1	3	2	+1	3	Runners-up
3	Chinese Taipei	2	0	0	2	0	5	−5	0	Third place

Source: VFF
(H) Hosts

11 November 2026 Casper Cup	Vietnam	2–0	Chinese Taipei	Ninh Bình
19:00 UTC+7	Olaha Mạnh Đức 21'; Nguyễn Đình Bắc 58'	Report		Stadium: Thiên Trường Stadium; Attendance: 2,148; Referee: Nawal Zubir (Malaysia)

17 November 2026 Casper Cup	Kyrgyzstan	2–1	Vietnam	Ninh Bình
19:00 UTC+7	Kichin 86'; Atabayev 88'	Report	Nguyễn Đình Bắc 19'	Stadium: Thiên Trường Stadium; Referee: Nawal Zubir (Malaysia)

=== Vietnam women's national football team ===
==== Kits ====
Home	Away

==== 2026 Asian Games ====
===== 2026 Asian Games Group E =====
Pos	Team	Pld	W	D	L	GF	GA	GD	Pts	Qualification
1	Japan (H)	3	3	0	0	20	0	+20	9	Advance to knockout stage
2	Chinese Taipei	3	2	0	1	3	5	−2	6	Advance to knockout stage
3	Vietnam	3	0	1	2	1	10	−9	1	Advance to knockout stage
4	Thailand	3	0	1	2	0	9	−9	1	

Source: Aichi–Nagoya 26
Rules for classification: Group stage tiebreakers
(H) Hosts

===== 2026 Asian Games fixtures and results =====
14 September 2026 Group E	Chinese Taipei	2–1	Vietnam	Shizuoka, Japan
16:00 UTC+9 (14:00 UTC+7)	Su Yu-hsuan 16'; Wakabayashi 81'	Report	Nguyễn Thị Thanh Nhã 86'	Stadium: Shizuoka Stadium; Attendance: 352; Referee: Park Se-jin (South Korea)

17 September 2026 Group E	Vietnam	0–8	Japan	Shizuoka, Japan
19:30 UTC+9 (17:30 UTC+7)		Report	Kamiya 12', 52'; Shiokoshi 19'; Cù Thị Huỳnh Như 43' (o.g.); Hamada 45+3'; Nishio 78'; Narumiya 81'; Yumura 90+2'	Stadium: Shizuoka Stadium; Attendance: 1,029; Referee: Esraa Al-Mbaiden (Jordan)

21 September 2026 Group E	Vietnam	0–0	Thailand	Osaka, Vietnam
19:30 UTC+9 (17:30 UTC+7)		Report		Stadium: Nagai Stadium; Attendance: 483; Referee: Veronika Bernatskaia (Kyrgyzstan)

25 September 2026 Quarter-finals	China	1–0 (a.e.t.)	Vietnam	Osaka, Japan
15:00 UTC+9 (13:00 UTC+7)	Wang Shuang 109'	Report		Stadium: Nagai Stadium; Attendance: 252; Referee: Azusa Sugino (Japan)

== Youth teams ==
=== Men ===
==== U-23/U-22/Olympic ====
===== 2026 Asian Games Group C =====
Pos	Team	Pld	W	D	L	GF	GA	GD	Pts	Qualification
1	Uzbekistan	3	3	0	0	9	1	+8	9	Advance to knockout stage
2	Vietnam	3	1	1	1	3	3	0	4	Advance to knockout stage
3	Philippines	3	1	0	2	3	8	−5	3	
4	Kuwait	3	0	1	2	2	5	−3	1	

Source: Aichi–Nagoya 26
Rules for classification: Group stage tiebreakers

===== 2026 Asian Games fixtures and results =====
15 September 2026 Group C	Vietnam	1–1	Kuwait	Aichi, Japan
19:00 UTC+9 (17:00 UTC+7)	Nguyễn Ngọc Mỹ 80'	Report	Al-Matar 78'	Stadium: CS Asset Minato Soccer Stadium; Attendance: 1,058; Referee: Kim Woo-sung (South Korea)

18 September 2026 Group C	Philippines	0–2	Vietnam	Aichi, Japan
15:30 UTC+9 (13:30 UTC+7)		Report	Nguyễn Thanh Nhàn 74'; Nguyễn Lê Phát 88'	Stadium: CS Asset Minato Soccer Stadium; Attendance: 513; Referee: Hiroki Kasahara (Japan)

22 September 2026 Group C	Vietnam	0–2	Uzbekistan	Aichi, Japan
14:00 UTC+9 (12:00 UTC+7)		Report	Urinboev 5'; Ibraimov 67'	Stadium: Paloma Mizuho Rugby Stadium; Attendance: 4,134; Referee: Meder Taichiev (Kyrgyzstan)

25 September 2026 Quarter-finals	South Korea	4–0	Vietnam	Aichi, Japan
19:30 UTC+9 (17:30 UTC+7)	Lee Young-jun 15', 81'; Kim Ji-soo 77'; Kim Myung-jun 88'	Report		Stadium: Paloma Mizuho Rugby Stadium; Attendance: 2,167; Referee: Firdavs Nosafarov (Uzbekistan)

===== Friendly tournaments =====
====== 2026 Gia Lai U-23 VTV Cup ======
Pos	Team	Pld	W	D	L	GF	GA	GD	Pts	
1	Vietnam (H, C)	3	2	1	0	5	1	+4	7	Champion
2	Qatar	3	1	2	0	3	2	+1	5	Runner-up
3	Thailand	3	1	0	2	4	6	−2	3	Third place
4	Singapore	3	0	1	2	1	4	−3	1	Fourth place

Source: VFF
(C) Champions; (H) Hosts

10 November 2026 Gia Lai U-23 VTV Cup	Vietnam	3–0	Thailand	Gia Lai
19:00 UTC+7	Nguyễn Minh Tâm 17', 48'; Williams Minh Hoàng 88' (pen.)	Report		Stadium: Pleiku Stadium; Referee: Razlan Joffri Ali (Malaysia)

12 November 2026 Gia Lai U-23 VTV Cup	Singapore	0–1	Vietnam	Gia Lai
19:00 UTC+7		Report	Nguyễn Bảo Long 70'	Stadium: Pleiku Stadium; Referee: Clifford Daypuyat (Philippines)

14 November 2026 Gia Lai U-23 VTV Cup	Vietnam	1–1	Qatar	Gia Lai
19:00 UTC+7	Nguyễn Minh Tâm 48'	Report	Faragalla 20'	Stadium: Pleiku Stadium; Referee: Razlan Joffri Ali (Malaysia)

==== U-20/U-19/U-18 ====
===== 2027 AFC U-20 Asian Cup qualification Group C =====
Pos	Team	Pld	W	D	L	GF	GA	GD	Pts	Qualification or relegation
1	North Korea	3	3	0	0	9	1	+8	9	Qualified for the final tournament
2	Iran	3	2	0	1	6	4	+2	6	Qualified for the final tournament
3	Palestine	3	1	0	2	3	7	−4	3	
4	Vietnam (H)	3	0	0	3	2	8	−6	0	Relegation to development phase

Source: AFC
Rules for classification: Qualification tiebreakers
(H) Hosts

31 August 2026 Group C	Vietnam	0–3	North Korea	Pbú Thọ, Vietnam
19:00 UTC+7		Report	Kim Yu Jin 46', 58'; Ri Hyok Gwong 50'	Stadium: Việt Trì Stadium; Referee: Ismaeel Habib Ali (Bahrain)

3 September 2026 Group C	Palestine	2–1	Vietnam	Pbú Thọ, Vietnam
19:00 UTC+7	Tayem 34'; Hamade 82'	Report	Nguyễn Quốc Khánh 66'	Stadium: Việt Trì Stadium; Referee: Sami Al-Ismail (Saudi Arabia)

6 September 2026 Group C	Iran	3–1	Vietnam	Pbú Thọ, Vietnam
19:00 UTC+7	Arian 50'; Beheshti 63' (pen.); Zadeh 95' (pen.)	Report	Nguyễn Quốc Khánh 41'	Stadium: Việt Trì Stadium; Referee: Harish Kundu (India)

==== U-17/U-16 ====
===== 2026 FIFA U-17 World Cup =====
====== 2026 FIFA U-17 World Cup Group G ======
Pos	Team	Pld	W	D	L	GF	GA	GD	Pts	Qualification
1	Mali	1	1	0	0	3	0	+3	3	Knockout stage
2	Belgium	1	1	0	0	3	2	+1	3	Knockout stage
3	Vietnam	1	0	0	1	2	3	−1	0	Possible knockout stage
4	New Zealand	1	0	0	1	0	3	−3	0	

Updated to match(es) played on 20 November 2026. Source: FIFA
Rules for classification: Group stage tiebreakers

====== 2026 FIFA U-17 World Cup fixtures and results ======
20 November 2026 Group G	Belgium	3–2	Vietnam	Al Rayyan, Qatar
16:00 UTC+3 (20:00 UTC+7)	Moorthamer 39'; Achahbar 42'; Philips 60'	Report	Lê Sỹ Bách 4'; Chu Ngọc Nguyễn Lực 84'	Stadium: Aspire Zone Pitch 9 Referee: Daiane Muniz (Brazil)

23 November 2026 Group G	Vietnam	v	New Zealand	Al Rayyan, Qatar
18:30 UTC+3 (22:30 UTC+7)		Report		Stadium: Aspire Zone Pitch 8

26 November 2026 Group G	Vietnam	v	Mali	Al Rayyan, Qatar
16:00 UTC+3 (20:00 UTC+7)		Report		Stadium: Aspire Zone Pitch 9

===== Friendly tournaments =====
====== 2026 CFA Team China Cup ======
Pos	Team	Pld	W	D	L	GF	GA	GD	Pts	
1	Australia (C)	3	2	1	0	7	4	+3	7	Champions
2	Kyrgyzstan	3	1	2	0	8	5	+3	5	Runners-up
3	China (H)	3	1	1	1	4	4	0	4	Third place
4	Vietnam	3	0	0	3	2	8	−6	0	Fourth place

Source: CFA
Rules for classification: 1) points; 2) goal difference; 3) goals scored; 4) head-to-head points; 5) head-to-head goal difference; 6) head-to-head number of goals scored; 7) Disciplinary points (yellow card = 1 point, red card as a result of two yellow cards = 3 points, direct red card = 3 points, yellow card followed by direct red card = 4 points).
(C) Champions; (H) Hosts

24 September 2026 Peace Cup	Australia	4–2	Vietnam	Liaoning, China
14:00 UTC+8 (13:00 UTC+7)	Harrison 28', 56'; Hooper 66' (pen.); Vương Đình Minh Quang 34' (o.g.)	Report	Nguyễn Văn Cảnh 21'; Nguyễn Minh Nhật 71'	Stadium: Shenhe District Cultural and Sports Center Stadium

27 September 2026 Peace Cup	China	1–0	Vietnam	Liaoning, China
14:00 UTC+8 (13:00 UTC+7)	Ji Zhenghao 68'	Report		Stadium: Shenhe District Cultural and Sports Center Stadium; Attendance: 2,180; Referee: Dai Yige (China)

30 September 2026 Peace Cup	Vietnam	0–3	Kyrgyzstan	Liaoning, China
14:00 UTC+8 (13:00 UTC+7)		Report	21'	Stadium: Shenhe District Cultural and Sports Center Stadium

==== U-15 ====
===== 2026 FIFA U-15 World Cup & Festival =====
====== 2026 FIFA U-15 World Cup & Festival Group R ======
Pos	Team	Pld	W	D	L	GF	GA	GD	Pts	Qualification	Bosnia and Herzegovina	Iran	Vietnam	Mauritius	Guyana	Brunei
1	Bosnia and Herzegovina	5	5	0	0	25	6	+19	15	Advance to Tier A		3–1	6–3	3–0	3–1	10–1
2	Iran	5	4	0	1	19	7	+12	12	Advance to Tier B			4–3	2–1	6–0	6–0
3	Vietnam	5	3	0	2	18	12	+6	9	Advance to Tier C				4–1	2–1	6–0
4	Mauritius	5	1	1	3	8	10	−2	4 (Note: Tied on head-to-head result (Guyana 1–1 Mauritius). Overall goal difference was used as the tiebreaker.)	Advance to Tier D					1–1	5–0
5	Guyana	5	1	1	3	6	12	−6	4	Advance to Tier E						3–0
6	Brunei	5	0	0	5	1	30	−29	0	Advance to Tier F						

Source: FIFA
Rules for classification: Qualification stage tiebreakers
Notes:

24 October 2026 Group R	Vietnam	3–6	Bosnia and Herzegovina	Baku, Azerbaijan
11:30 UTC+4 (14:30 UTC+7)	Trương Tuấn Bảo 20'; Hà Thanh Phước An 22'; Nguyễn Xuân Vinh 32'	Report	Spahić 2'; Abazović 5', 12'; Suljević 15', 31'; Skoko 33'	Stadium: Hövsan Competition Complex Pitch 4B

25 October 2026 Group R	Brunei	0–6	Vietnam	Baku, Azerbaijan
10:15 UTC+4 (13:15 UTC+7)		Report	Trương Vận Tài 9'; Nguyễn Gia Khang 10'; Nguyễn Xuân Vinh 16' (pen.); Hà Thanh Phước An 31'; Võ Anh Hào 35'	Stadium: Hövsan Competition Complex Pitch 2B

25 October 2026 Group R	Mauritius	1–4	Vietnam	Baku, Azerbaijan
17:00 UTC+4 (20:00 UTC+7)	Ethan 23'	Report	Hà Thanh Phước An 12'; Trương Vận Tài 27', 38'; Nguyễn Xuân Vinh 40+1'	Stadium: Hövsan Competition Complex Pitch 3B

26 October 2026 Group R	Vietnam	3–4	Iran	Baku, Azerbaijan
09:00 UTC+4 (12:00 UTC+7)	Vũ Tiến Tài Lộc 13'; Đỗ Quang Hùng 36', 39'	Report	Norouzi 2'; Ahmadloo 28', 30', 34'	Stadium: Hövsan Competition Complex Pitch 1B

26 October 2026 Group R	Vietnam	2–1	Guyana	Baku, Azerbaijan
15:45 UTC+4 (18:45 UTC+7)		Report		Stadium: Hövsan Competition Complex Pitch 2B

28 October 2026 65th–96th round of 32	Vietnam	2–2 (2–4 p)	Rwanda	Baku, Azerbaijan
12:45 UTC+4 (15:45 UTC+7)		Report		Stadium: Hövsan Competition Complex Pitch 2B

28 October 2026 81st–96th round of 16	Nicaragua	3–5	Vietnam	Baku, Azerbaijan
19:30 UTC+4 (22:30 UTC+7)		Report		Stadium: Hövsan Competition Complex Pitch 2B

29 October 2026 81st–88th quarter-finals	Cuba	1–2	Vietnam	Baku, Azerbaijan
11:30 UTC+4 (14:30 UTC+7)		Report		Stadium: Hövsan Competition Complex Pitch 6B

29 October 2026 81st–84th semi-finals	Azerbaijan	2–4	Vietnam	Baku, Azerbaijan
9:30 UTC+4 (22:30 UTC+7)		Report		Stadium: Hövsan Competition Complex Pitch 10A

30 October 2026 81st–place match	Hungary	3–2	Vietnam	Baku, Azerbaijan
11:30 UTC+4 (14:30 UTC+7)		Report		Stadium: Hövsan Competition Complex Pitch 9A

=== Women ===
==== U-17/U-16 ====
===== 2027 AFC U-17 Women's Asian Cup fixtures and results =====
April 2027 Group ?	v	Suzhou, China
--:-- UTC+8 (--:-- UTC+7)

April 2027 Group ?	v	Suzhou, China
--:-- UTC+8 (--:-- UTC+7)

April 2027 Group ?	v	Suzhou, China
18:00 UTC+7 (--:-- UTC+7)

===== 2027 AFC U-17 Women's Asian Cup qualification Group D =====
Pos	Team	Pld	W	D	L	GF	GA	GD	Pts	Qualification
1	Vietnam (H)	3	3	0	0	28	0	+28	9	Final tournament
2	Kyrgyzstan	3	2	0	1	20	3	+17	6	
3	Palestine	3	1	0	2	9	8	+1	3	
4	Northern Mariana Islands	3	0	0	3	0	46	−46	0	

Source: AFC
Rules for classification: Qualification tiebreakers
(H) Hosts

5 October 2026 Group D	Vietnam	6–0	Palestine	Ho Chi Minh City, Vietnam
18:00 UTC+7	Nguyễn Lê Khánh Đan 32', 47'; Đỗ Thị Hà Vi 39'; Nguyễn Thị Ngọc Ánh 42', 69'; Phan Thị Thu Phương 90'	Report		Stadium: Bà Rịa Stadium; Referee: Yang Shu-ting (Chinese Taipei)

8 October 2026 Group D	Northern Mariana Islands	0–20	Vietnam	Ho Chi Minh City, Vietnam
18:00 UTC+7		Report	Trương Khánh Chi 1', 12', 18', 46', 70', 74'; Nguyễn Quỳnh Lâm 3', 26', 71'; Phan Thị Thu Phương 16', 84'; Nguyễn Thị Ngọc Ánh 21', 57'; Trương Yến Linh 44'; Đỗ Thị Hà Vi 45+3', 84', 89'; Hà Yến Nhi 59'; Nguyễn Thị Thủy 88'; Phạm Hà My 90'	Stadium: Bà Rịa Stadium; Referee: Esra'a Al-Mbaidin (Jordan)

11 October 2026 Group D	Vietnam	2–0	Kyrgyzstan	Ho Chi Minh City, Vietnam
18:00 UTC+7		Report		Stadium: Bà Rịa Stadium

== League season ==
=== Men ===
==== V.League 1 ====
===== V.League 1 standings =====
Pos	Team	Pld	W	D	L	GF	GA	GD	Pts	Qualification or relegation
1	Thep Xanh Nam Dinh	7	5	1	1	16	6	+10	16	Qualification for the AFC Champions League Two group stage and ASEAN Club Championship group stage (Note: The winners of the 2026–27 Vietnamese Cup also qualify for the ASEAN Club Championship group stage. If the Vietnamese Cup winners is also the V.League 1 winners, the ASEAN Club Championship group stage spot will be passed to third-placed team.)
2	Song Lam Nghe An	8	3	5	0	13	7	+6	14	Qualification for the AFC Champions League Two qualifying play-offs
3	Cong An Hanoi	7	4	2	1	11	5	+6	14	
4	Ninh Binh	7	4	1	2	14	10	+4	13	
5	Thanh Hoa	8	3	3	2	11	11	0	12	
6	Hong Linh Ha Tinh	7	3	2	2	10	9	+1	11	
7	Haiphong	7	3	1	3	14	12	+2	10	
8	Cong An Ho Chi Minh City	7	3	1	3	7	6	+1	10	
9	Hanoi FC	7	3	0	4	8	12	−4	9	
10	SHB Da Nang	7	3	0	4	8	12	−4	9	
11	Bac Ninh	7	2	2	3	5	6	−1	8	
12	The Cong-Viettel	8	1	3	4	7	11	−4	6	
13	Hoang Anh Gia Lai	8	2	0	6	10	17	−7	6	Relegation to V.League 2
14	Dong Nai City	7	1	1	5	1	11	−10	4	Relegation to V.League 2

Updated to match(es) played on 20 November 2026. Source: VPF
Rules for classification: 1) Points; 2) Head-to-head points; 3) Head-to-head goal difference; 4) Head-to-head goals scored; 5) Goal difference; 6) Goals scored; 7) Away goals scored; 8) Disciplinary points.

==== V.League 2 ====
===== V.League 2 standings =====
Pos	Team	Pld	W	D	L	GF	GA	GD	Pts	Promotion or relegation
1	Thai Nguyen	8	5	1	2	17	8	+9	16	Promotion to V.League 1
2	Becamex Ho Chi Minh City	7	5	1	1	14	6	+8	16	Promotion to V.League 1
3	Ho Chi Minh City FC	8	5	1	2	11	6	+5	16	
4	Hung Yen	7	4	2	1	20	6	+14	14	
5	Aurora Saigon United	7	4	1	2	11	9	+2	13	
6	Khatoco Khanh Hoa	7	3	3	1	10	6	+4	12	
7	Van Hien University	7	3	2	2	7	7	0	11	
8	Cong An Nhan Dan	7	3	1	3	9	11	−2	10	
9	Thep Can Tho	7	2	2	3	5	12	−7	8	
10	Quy Nhon United	7	1	3	3	8	8	0	6	
11	Hue	7	1	2	4	7	15	−8	5	
12	Long An	7	0	4	3	4	8	−4	4	
13	Lam Dong	7	1	1	5	6	13	−7	4	Relegation to Vietnamese Second Division
14	Xuan Thien Phu Tho	7	0	2	5	6	20	−14	2	Relegation to Vietnamese Second Division

Updated to match(es) played on 20 November 2026. Source: VPF
Rules for classification: 1) Points; 2) Head-to-head points; 3) Head-to-head goal difference; 4) Head-to-head goals scored; 5) Goal difference; 6) Goals scored; 7) Away goals scored; 8) Fair-play points.

== Cup competitions ==
=== Men ===
==== Vietnamese Super Cup ====
30 August 2026
18:00 UTC+7

Cong An Hanoi	5–0	Cong An Ho Chi Minh City
Alan 8', 27'; Perea 45+3'; Nguyễn Đình Bắc 69'; Putros 71'	Report

Hàng Đẫy Stadium, Hanoi
Attendance: 15,120
Referee: Mai Xuân Hùng

== Vietnamese clubs in Asia ==
=== AFC Champions League Elite ===
==== Preliminary round ====
Team 1	Score	Team 2
Adelaide United (Australia)	0–2	(Vietnam) Công An Hà Nội

==== League stage ====
Pos	Team	Pld	W	D	L	GF	GA	GD	Pts
9	(China) Beijing Guoan	4	2	1	1	10	10	0	7
10	(South Korea) Daejeon Hana Citizen	4	1	1	2	2	4	−2	4
11	(Vietnam) Công An Hà Nội	4	1	1	2	4	7	−3	4
12	(Thailand) Buriram United	4	0	3	1	2	3	−1	3
13	(Thailand) Port	4	1	0	3	9	14	−5	3

Updated to match(es) played on 4 November 2026. Source: AFC
Rules for classification: 1) points; 2) goal difference; 3) number of goals scored; 4) number of matches won; 5) penalty shoot-out if only two teams remain tied and played each other on the final matchday 6) fair play ranking; 7) drawing of lots

Home team	Score	Away team
Gamba Osaka (Japan)	4–1	(Vietnam) Công An Hà Nội
Công An Hà Nội (Vietnam)	0–1	(Japan) Kashima Antlers
Shanghai Port (China)	2–3	(Vietnam) Công An Hà Nội
Công An Hà Nội (Vietnam)	0–0	(Japan) Kyoto Sanga
Công An Hà Nội (Vietnam)	24 Nov	(Japan) Vissel Kobe
Kashiwa Reysol (Japan)	1 Dec	(Vietnam) Công An Hà Nội
Công An Hà Nội (Vietnam)	9 Feb	(China) Beijing Guoan
Johor Darul Ta'zim (Malaysia)	16 Feb	(Vietnam) Công An Hà Nội

=== AFC Champions League Two ===
==== Group stage ====
Pos	Team	Pld	W	D	L	GF	GA	GD	Pts	Qualification	SIB	SEO	MVC	TCV
1	(Indonesia) Persib (A)	4	4	0	0	6	1	+5	12	Advance to round of 16	—	–	2–0	1–0
2	(South Korea) FC Seoul	4	2	0	2	8	4	+4	6	Advance to round of 16	0–1	—	–	3–0
3	(Australia) Melbourne Victory	4	1	1	2	5	5	0	4		1–2	3–0	—	–
4	(Vietnam) Thể Công–Viettel	4	0	1	3	1	10	−9	1		–	0–5	1–1	—

Updated to match(es) played on 4 November 2026. Source: ACL2
(A) Advance to a further round

=== AFC Women's Champions League ===
==== Group stage ====
Pos	Team	Pld	W	D	L	GF	GA	GD	Pts	Qualification
1	(North Korea) April 25	3	3	0	0	10	1	+9	9	Advance to Quarter-finals
2	(South Korea) Hwacheon KSPO	3	2	0	1	8	4	+4	6	Advance to Quarter-finals
3	(India) East Bengal (H)	3	1	0	2	3	7	−4	3	Advance to Quarter-finals
4	(Vietnam) Hồ Chí Minh City	3	0	0	3	2	11	−9	0	

Source: AFC
Rules for classification: Tiebreakers
(H) Hosts

== Vietnamese clubs in Southeast Asia ==
=== ASEAN Club Championship ===
==== Group stage ====
===== Group A =====
Pos	Team	Pld	W	D	L	GF	GA	GD	Pts	Qualification
1	(Singapore) Tampines Rovers	2	1	1	0	5	4	+1	4	Advance to knockout stage
2	(Vietnam) Công An Hồ Chí Minh City	2	1	1	0	2	1	+1	4	Advance to knockout stage
3	(Indonesia) Borneo	2	1	1	0	1	0	+1	4	Advance to knockout stage
4	(Malaysia) Kuching City	1	0	1	0	2	2	0	1	Advance to knockout stage
5	(Thailand) Ratchaburi	2	0	1	1	3	4	−1	1	
6	(Thailand) Buriram United	2	0	1	1	0	1	−1	1	
7	(Philippines) Manila Digger	1	0	0	1	0	1	−1	0	

Updated to match(es) played on 18 November 2026. Source: ASEAN United
Rules for classification: Tiebreakers

===== Group B =====
Pos	Team	Pld	W	D	L	GF	GA	GD	Pts	Qualification
1	(Malaysia) Johor Darul Ta'zim	2	2	0	0	9	1	+8	6	Advance to knockout stage
2	(Indonesia) Persib	2	2	0	0	9	1	+8	6	Advance to knockout stage
3	(Vietnam) Công An Hà Nội	2	1	0	1	2	3	−1	3	Advance to knockout stage
4	(Cambodia) PKR Svay Rieng	2	1	0	1	4	7	−3	3	Advance to knockout stage
5	(Singapore) Lion City Sailors	1	0	0	1	0	1	−1	0	
6	(Thailand) Port	2	0	0	2	2	7	−5	0	
7	(Myanmar) Shan United	1	0	0	1	0	6	−6	0	

Updated to match(es) played on 19 November 2026. Source: ASEAN United
Rules for classification: Tiebreakers

== Multi-sports events ==
=== 2026 Vietnam National Games ===
==== Football ====
===== Men =====
Group A

Pos	Team	Pld	W	D	L	GF	GA	GD	Pts	Qualification
1	Hồ Chí Minh City (H)	0	0	0	0	0	0	0	0	Advance to knockout stage
2	Hà Nội	0	0	0	0	0	0	0	0	Advance to knockout stage
3	People's Army	0	0	0	0	0	0	0	0	
4	Đắk Lắk	0	0	0	0	0	0	0	0	

First match(es) will be played: 22 November 2026. Source: 2026 Vietnam National Games
Rules for classification: Group stage tiebreakers
(H) Hosts

Group B

Pos	Team	Pld	W	D	L	GF	GA	GD	Pts	Qualification
1	Nghệ An	0	0	0	0	0	0	0	0	Advance to knockout stage
2	People's Public Security	0	0	0	0	0	0	0	0	Advance to knockout stage
3	Huế	0	0	0	0	0	0	0	0	
4	An Giang	0	0	0	0	0	0	0	0	
5	Đồng Tháp	0	0	0	0	0	0	0	0	

First match(es) will be played: 22 November 2026. Source: 2026 Vietnam National Games
Rules for classification: Group stage tiebreakers

===== Women =====
Group table

Pos	Team	Pld	W	D	L	GF	GA	GD	Pts	Qualification
1	Ninh Bình	1	1	0	0	2	1	+1	3	Gold medal match
2	Hồ Chí Minh City (H)	1	1	0	0	1	0	+1	3	Gold medal match
3	Hà Nội	1	0	0	1	0	1	−1	0	Bronze medal match
4	Thái Nguyên	1	0	0	1	1	2	−1	0	Bronze medal match

Updated to match(es) played on 19 November 2026. Source: Vietnam National Games
(H) Hosts

==== Futsal ====
Group A

Pos	Team	Pld	W	D	L	GF	GA	GD	Pts	Qualification
1	Đồng Nai	1	1	0	0	6	4	+2	3	Advance to semi-finals
2	Hà Nội	1	1	0	0	4	2	+2	3	Advance to semi-finals
3	Quảng Ninh	1	0	0	1	2	4	−2	0	
4	Lâm Đồng	1	0	0	1	4	6	−2	0	

Updated to match(es) played on 20 November 2026. Source: 2026 Vietnam National Games
Rules for classification: 1) Points; 2) Head-to-head points; 3) Head-to-head goal difference; 4) Head-to-head goals scored; 5) Goal difference; 6) Goals scored

Group B

Pos	Team	Pld	W	D	L	GF	GA	GD	Pts	Qualification
1	Hồ Chí Minh City (H)	1	1	0	0	2	0	+2	3	Advance to semi-finals
2	Đồng Tháp	1	1	0	0	2	1	+1	3	Advance to semi-finals
3	Quảng Ngãi	1	0	0	1	1	2	−1	0	
4	Tây Ninh	1	0	0	1	0	2	−2	0	

Updated to match(es) played on 20 November 2026. Source: 2026 Vietnam National Games
Rules for classification: 1) Points; 2) Head-to-head points; 3) Head-to-head goal difference; 4) Head-to-head goals scored; 5) Goal difference; 6) Goals scored
(H) Hosts
