= Football at the 2026 Vietnam National Games =

Domestic sports tournament in Vietnam

- Location: Ho Chi Minh City
- Dates: 19 November – 6 December
- Organizing body: Ministry of Culture, Sports and Tourism

The football tournament at the 2026 Vietnam National Games are held from 19 November to 6 December in Ho Chi Minh City, Vietnam.

Quảng Ninh were the women's defending champions, but withdrew before the matches began. Nghệ An are the men's defending champions.

== Venues ==
A total of 3 venues in Ho Chi Minh City, Vietnam are used to host the football matches.

Men's tournament		Location of the host cities of the football at the 2026 Vietnam National Games.
Thủ Dầu Một, Hồ Chí Minh City	Đông Hòa, Hồ Chí Minh City	Location of the host cities of the football at the 2026 Vietnam National Games.
Bình Dương Stadium	Đông Hòa Stadium	Location of the host cities of the football at the 2026 Vietnam National Games.
Capacity: 18,250	Capacity: 5,000	Location of the host cities of the football at the 2026 Vietnam National Games.
Women's tournament		Location of the host cities of the football at the 2026 Vietnam National Games.
Bà Rịa, Hồ Chí Minh City		Location of the host cities of the football at the 2026 Vietnam National Games.
Bà Rịa Stadium		Location of the host cities of the football at the 2026 Vietnam National Games.
Capacity: 10,000		Location of the host cities of the football at the 2026 Vietnam National Games.

== Men's tournament ==
=== Group stage ===
==== Group A ====
Pos	Team	Pld	W	D	L	GF	GA	GD	Pts	Qualification
1	Hồ Chí Minh City (H)	0	0	0	0	0	0	0	0	Advance to knockout stage
2	Hà Nội	0	0	0	0	0	0	0	0	Advance to knockout stage
3	People's Army	0	0	0	0	0	0	0	0	
4	Đắk Lắk	0	0	0	0	0	0	0	0	

First match(es) will be played: 22 November 2026. Source: 2026 Vietnam National Games
Rules for classification: Group stage tiebreakers
(H) Hosts

==== Group B ====
Pos	Team	Pld	W	D	L	GF	GA	GD	Pts	Qualification
1	Đồng Tháp	1	1	0	0	3	0	+3	3	Advance to knockout stage
2	Nghệ An	1	0	1	0	1	1	0	1	Advance to knockout stage
3	People's Public Security	1	0	1	0	1	1	0	1	
4	Huế	0	0	0	0	0	0	0	0	
5	An Giang	1	0	0	1	0	3	−3	0	

Updated to match(es) played on 22 November 2026. Source: 2026 Vietnam National Games
Rules for classification: Group stage tiebreakers

== Women's tournament ==
=== Group table ===
Pos	Team	Pld	W	D	L	GF	GA	GD	Pts	Qualification
1	Ninh Bình	1	1	0	0	2	1	+1	3	Gold medal match
2	Hồ Chí Minh City (H)	1	1	0	0	1	0	+1	3	Gold medal match
3	Hà Nội	1	0	0	1	0	1	−1	0	Bronze medal match
4	Thái Nguyên	1	0	0	1	1	2	−1	0	Bronze medal match

Updated to match(es) played on 19 November 2026. Source: Vietnam National Games
(H) Hosts

== Medal summary ==
=== Medal table ===
* Host nation (Hồ Chí Minh City)

Rank	Nation	Gold	Silver	Bronze	Total
1	Hồ Chí Minh City*	0	0	0	0
Totals (1 entries)		0	0	0	0

=== Medalists ===
Event	Gold	Silver	Bronze
Men's tournament			
Women's tournament			
