= Athletics at the 2026 Vietnam National Games – Marathon =

Marathon at the 2026 Vietnam National Games
- Venue: April 2 Square, Nha Trang, Khánh Hòa
- Date: 29 March 2026

Medalists
gold medal	Hoàng Nguyên Thanh (Đồng Nai) (Men)
gold medal	Phạm Thị Hồng Lệ (Gia Lai) (Women)
silver medal	Phạm Ngọc Phan (Lâm Đồng) (Men)
silver medal	Hoàng Thị Ngọc Hoa (Đồng Nai) (Women)
bronze medal	Nguyễn Văn Lai (People's Army) (Men)
bronze medal	Phạm Huỳnh Yến Thư (Đắk Lắk) (Women)

Marathon at the 2026 Vietnam National Games was held in Khánh Hòa province, Vietnam, on 29 March 2026 at April 2 Square in Nha Trang ward.

The results in the men's and women's marathon events (42.195 km distance) in the advanced category of the 67th Tiền Phong Marathon National Championship were directly recognized by the Sports Authority of Vietnam and included in the medal table.

== Results ==
=== Men's marathon ===
Rank	Athlete	Delegate	Time
1st place, gold medalist(s)	Hoàng Nguyên Thanh	Đồng Nai	2:22:19
2nd place, silver medalist(s)	Phạm Ngọc Phan	Lâm Đồng	2:24:17
3rd place, bronze medalist(s)	Nguyễn Văn Lai	People's Army	2:25:30
4	Lê Văn Tuấn	Hồ Chí Minh City	2:28:06
5	Trịnh Minh Tâm	Gia Lai	2:29:07
6	Mai Quí Phong	Quảng Trị	2:30:50
7	Đào Minh Thiện	People's Army	2:36:08
8	Nguyễn Đăng Khoa	Hồ Chí Minh City	2:40:10
9	Hà Quang Thắng	Gia Lai	2:43:03
10	Hồ Quang Bình	Huế	2:45:09
11	Triệu Tiến Luyện	Lâm Đồng	2:54:01
12	Lê Hoàng Thân	Tây Ninh	3:32:45
13	Trần Đình Khang	Tây Ninh	4:28:28
14	Nguyễn Hải Đăng	Tây Ninh	4:37:15

=== Women's marathon ===
Rank	Athlete	Delegate	Time
1st place, gold medalist(s)	Phạm Thị Hồng Lệ	Gia Lai	2:42:06
2nd place, silver medalist(s)	Hoàng Thị Ngọc Hoa	Đồng Nai	2:44:13
3rd place, bronze medalist(s)	Phạm Huỳnh Yến Thư	Đắk Lắk	2:51:06
4	Hán Thị Bích Thư	People's Army	2:57:01
5	Lê Thị Hà	Hồ Chí Minh City	3:02:22
6	Nguyễn Thị Duyên	Gia Lai	3:10:48
7	Lê Thị Yến Khoa	Cần Thơ	3:30:49
