= Futsal at the 2026 Vietnam National Games =

2026 Vietnam National Games Futsal Tournament

Tournament details
- Host country: Vietnam
- Dates: 20–29 November
- Teams: 8 (from 8 associations)
- Venue: 1 (in 1 host city)

Tournament statistics
- Matches played: 6
- Goals scored: 31 (5.17 per match)
- All statistics correct as of 22 November 2026.

The futsal tournament at the 2026 Vietnam National Games is currently held on 20 to 29 November 2026. It is the 4th edition of the Vietnam National Games futsal tournament.

== Competition schedule ==
The following is the competition schedule for the men's futsal competitions:

Legend
GS	Group stage	1/2	Semi-finals	F	Gold medal match

Fri 20	Sat 21	Sun 22	Mon 23	Tue 24	Wed 25	Thu 26	Fri 27	Sat 28	Sun 29
GS		GS	GS	GS	GS		SF		F

== Venue ==
Hồ Chí Minh City
Chánh Hưng ward Sports Arena
Capacity: 300
Futsal at the 2026 Vietnam National Games (Ho Chi Minh City)

== Participating teams ==
The following eight teams participated for the competition, the teams are drawn into 2 groups.

- Group A: Hà Nội, Lâm Đồng, Đồng Nai, Quảng Ninh
- Group B: Hồ Chí Minh City, Đồng Tháp, Quảng Ngãi, Tây Ninh

The participating teams were represented by Vietnam Futsal League teams: Hà Nội by Thái Sơn Bắc, Quảng Ninh by Hà Nội FC and Luxury Hạ Long, Lâm Đồng by Thái Sơn Nam Youth, Đồng Nai by Hồ Chí Minh City Youth, Hồ Chí Minh City by Thái Sơn Nam, Đồng Tháp by Sahako, Quảng Ngãi by Sài Gòn Titans and Tây Ninh by Tân Hiệp Hưng.

== Squads ==
Each teams has to register a squad of 8 to 14 players, including a minimum of two goalkeepers. Futsal players born on or after 1 January 2011 are eligible to compete in the tournament.

== Group stage ==
=== Group A ===
Pos	Team	Pld	W	D	L	GF	GA	GD	Pts	Qualification
1	Đồng Nai	1	1	0	0	6	4	+2	3	Advance to semi-finals
2	Hà Nội	1	1	0	0	4	2	+2	3	Advance to semi-finals
3	Quảng Ninh	1	0	0	1	2	4	−2	0	
4	Lâm Đồng	1	0	0	1	4	6	−2	0	

Updated to match(es) played on 20 November 2026. Source: 2026 Vietnam National Games
Rules for classification: 1) Points; 2) Head-to-head points; 3) Head-to-head goal difference; 4) Head-to-head goals scored; 5) Goal difference; 6) Goals scored
20 November 2026
13:00

Lâm Đồng	4–6	Đồng Nai
Võ Trần Quốc Dũng; Nguyễn Phú Trọng; Dương Công Kiên	Report	Trương Minh Tuấn; Trương Thanh Phong; Nguyễn Bá Thanh Tú; Nguyễn Tiến Kiệt

Futsal Chánh Hưng ward Sports Arena, Chánh Hưng, Hồ Chí Minh City

20 November 2026
15:00

Hà Nội	4–2	Quảng Ninh
An Lâm Tới; Phạm Quang Huy o.g.; Nguyễn Nhân Nam; Hoàng Sỹ Linh	Report	Nguyễn Thế Cảnh; Nguyễn Thạc Hiếu

Futsal Chánh Hưng ward Sports Arena, Chánh Hưng, Hồ Chí Minh City

23 November 2026
15:00

Quảng Ninh	–	Lâm Đồng

Futsal Chánh Hưng ward Sports Arena, Chánh Hưng, Hồ Chí Minh City

23 November 2026
17:00

Đồng Nai	–	Hà Nội

Futsal Chánh Hưng ward Sports Arena, Chánh Hưng, Hồ Chí Minh City

25 November 2026
15:00

Quảng Ninh	–	Đồng Nai

Futsal Chánh Hưng ward Sports Arena, Chánh Hưng, Hồ Chí Minh City

25 November 2026
17:00

Hà Nội	–	Lâm Đồng

Futsal Chánh Hưng ward Sports Arena, Chánh Hưng, Hồ Chí Minh City

=== Group B ===
Pos	Team	Pld	W	D	L	GF	GA	GD	Pts	Qualification
1	Hồ Chí Minh City (H)	2	2	0	0	6	0	+6	6	Advance to semi-finals
2	Đồng Tháp	2	2	0	0	6	3	+3	6	Advance to semi-finals
3	Tây Ninh	2	0	0	2	2	6	−4	0	
4	Quảng Ngãi	2	0	0	2	1	6	−5	0	

Updated to match(es) played on 22 November 2026. Source: 2026 Vietnam National Games
Rules for classification: 1) Points; 2) Head-to-head points; 3) Head-to-head goal difference; 4) Head-to-head goals scored; 5) Goal difference; 6) Goals scored
(H) Hosts
20 November 2026
17:00

Đồng Tháp	2–1	Quảng Ngãi
Yzen Nie Kdăm; Đinh Bộ Thành	Report	Nguyễn Lâm Gia Thọ

Futsal Chánh Hưng ward Sports Arena, Chánh Hưng, Hồ Chí Minh City

20 November 2026
19:00

Hồ Chí Minh City	2–0	Tây Ninh
Nguyễn Tiến Hùng; Dương Ngọc Linh	Report

Futsal Chánh Hưng ward Sports Arena, Chánh Hưng, Hồ Chí Minh City

22 November 2026
15:00

Tây Ninh	2–4	Đồng Tháp
Phạm Duy Bảo; Trần Công Minh		Huỳnh Mi Woen; Trần Thanh Phong; Đinh Bộ Thành

Futsal Chánh Hưng ward Sports Arena, Chánh Hưng, Hồ Chí Minh City

22 November 2026
17:00

Quảng Ngãi	0–4	Hồ Chí Minh City
		Huỳnh Văn Hoài; Nguyễn Thịnh Phát; Nhan Gia Hưng

Futsal Chánh Hưng ward Sports Arena, Chánh Hưng, Hồ Chí Minh City

24 November 2026
15:00

Tây Ninh	–	Quảng Ngãi

Futsal Chánh Hưng ward Sports Arena, Chánh Hưng, Hồ Chí Minh City

24 November 2026
17:00

Hồ Chí Minh City	–	Đồng Tháp

Futsal Chánh Hưng ward Sports Arena, Chánh Hưng, Hồ Chí Minh City

== Knockout stage ==
=== Bracket ===
Semi-finals
27 November – Chánh Hưng
Winner Group A
Runner-up Group B
27 November – Chánh Hưng
Winner Group B
Runner-up Group A

Final
29 November – Chánh Hưng
Winner SF1
Winner SF2

=== Semi-finals ===
27 November 2026
15:00

Winner Group A	–	Runner-up Group B

Futsal Chánh Hưng ward Sports Arena, Chánh Hưng, Hồ Chí Minh City

27 November 2026
17:00

Winner Group B	–	Runner-up Group A

Futsal Chánh Hưng ward Sports Arena, Chánh Hưng, Hồ Chí Minh City

=== Final ===
29 November 2026
16:00

Winner SF1	–	Winner SF2

Futsal Chánh Hưng ward Sports Arena, Chánh Hưng, Hồ Chí Minh City

== Medal summary ==
Event	Gold	Silver	Bronze
Men's tournament			
