= 2013 World Taekwondo Championships – Women's bantamweight =

Women's bantamweight at the 2013 World Championships
- Venue: Exhibition Center of Puebla
- Dates: 18 July 2013
- Competitors: 46 from 45 nations

Medalists
| gold medal | Kim Yu-jin | South Korea |
| silver medal | Ana Zaninović | Croatia |
| bronze medal | Yamisel Núñez | Cuba |
| bronze medal | Floriane Liborio | France |

The women's bantamweight is a competition featured at the 2013 World Taekwondo Championships, and was held at the Exhibition Center of Puebla in Puebla, Mexico on July 18. Bantamweights were limited to a maximum of 53 kilograms in body mass.

== Results ==
- DQ — Won by disqualification
- P — Won by punitive declaration

=== Finals ===
| Semifinals | | Final |
| Yamisel Núñez (CUB) | 1 |
| Kim Yu-jin (KOR) | 4 | Kim Yu-jin (KOR) | 7 |
| Ana Zaninović (CRO) | 7 | Ana Zaninović (CRO) | 6 |
| Floriane Liborio (FRA) | 2 |

=== Top half ===
==== Section 1 ====
Round of 64
Rebeca Torrado (ESP) | 4
Natalia Moka (GRE) | 1
Suvi Mikkonen (FIN) | 3
Yamisel Núñez (CUB) | 4
Trương Thị Nhớ (VIE) | 10
Irene Pasiouli (CYP) | 0

Round of 32
Hatice Kübra Yangın (TUR) | 7
Rebeca Torrado (ESP) | 4
~~Nur Liyana Shaharuddin (MAS)~~
Dewi Puspitasari (INA) | DQ
Caroline Fisher (GBR) | 1
Yamisel Núñez (CUB) | 2
Trương Thị Nhớ (VIE) | 9
Disnansi Polanco (DOM) | 4

Round of 16
Hatice Kübra Yangın (TUR) | 6
Dewi Puspitasari (INA) | 1
Yamisel Núñez (CUB) | 8
Trương Thị Nhớ (VIE) | 1

Quarterfinals
Hatice Kübra Yangın (TUR) | 5
Yamisel Núñez (CUB) | 10

==== Section 2 ====
Round of 64
~~Marlene Hernández (PAN)~~
Caroline Marton (AUS) | DQ
Awa Ouattara (CIV) | 3
Sabina Mikayilova (AZE) | 7
Janike Lai (NOR) | 1
Katsiaryna Lis (BLR) | 0
Pauline Lopez (PHI) | 9
Yeny Contreras (CHI) | 4

Round of 32
Kim Yu-jin (KOR) | 11
Caroline Marton (AUS) | 8
Sabina Mikayilova (AZE) | 2
Cheyenne Lewis (USA) | 3
~~Mary Mureu (KEN)~~
Janike Lai (NOR) | DQ
Pauline Lopez (PHI) | 2
Ivett Gonda (HUN) | 1

Round of 16
Kim Yu-jin (KOR) | 8
Cheyenne Lewis (USA) | 7
Janike Lai (NOR) | 3
Pauline Lopez (PHI) | 2

Quarterfinals
Kim Yu-jin (KOR) | 4
Janike Lai (NOR) | 1

=== Bottom half ===
==== Section 3 ====
Round of 64
Parisa Ghorbani (IRI) | 3
Li Yaoyao (CHN) | 8^{P}
Aniat Oquendo (PUR) | 2
Jennifer Navarro (ARG) | 1
Leandris Quiñones (VEN) | DQ
~~Aminata Traoré (MLI)~~
Guzal Narbabaeva (UZB) | 4
Cecilia Lee (CAN) | 5

Round of 32
Ana Zaninović (CRO) | 2
Li Yaoyao (CHN) | 0
Aniat Oquendo (PUR) | 4
Suchitra Singh (WTF) | 1
Talisca Reis (BRA) | 2
Leandris Quiñones (VEN) | 0
Cecilia Lee (CAN) | 0
Diana Lara (MEX) | 3

Round of 16
Ana Zaninović (CRO) | 7
Aniat Oquendo (PUR) | 0
Talisca Reis (BRA) | 2
Diana Lara (MEX) | 12

Quarterfinals
Ana Zaninović (CRO) | 4
Diana Lara (MEX) | 3

==== Section 4 ====
Round of 64
Dragana Gladović (SRB) | 2
Aleksandra Lychagina (RUS) | 1
Lo Wan-chu (TPE) | 9
Roxana Nothaft (GER) | 3
Fariza Aldangorova (KAZ) | 4
Laura García (COL) | 7

Round of 32
Sarita Phongsri (THA) | 5
Dragana Gladović (SRB) | 0
Lo Wan-chu (TPE) | 1
Manuela Bezzola (SUI) | 2
Gansükhiin Oyuun-Erdene (MGL) | 6
Erica Nicoli (ITA) | 7
Laura García (COL) | 0
Floriane Liborio (FRA) | 9

Round of 16
Sarita Phongsri (THA) | 5
Manuela Bezzola (SUI) | 2
Erica Nicoli (ITA) | 1
Floriane Liborio (FRA) | 3

Quarterfinals
Sarita Phongsri (THA) | 6
Floriane Liborio (FRA) | 9
