= Judo at the 2026 Vietnam National Games =

Judo Judo at the 2026 Vietnam National Game
- Venue: Vũng Tàu Ward Gymnasium
- Location: Ho Chi Minh City, Vietnam
- Dates: 14–22 November 2026
- No. of events: 32

Judo competitions at the 2026 Vietnam National Games in Ho Chi Minh City will take place from 14 to 22 November at Grand Palais Vũng Tàu Ward Gymnasium.

== Competition events ==
Judo at the Games will include 32 events, specifically as follows:

=== Weight categories (18 events) ===
+ Men: -50kg,-55kg; -60kg; -66kg; -73kg; -81kg; -90kg; -100kg; +100kg.

+ Women: -40kg, -44kg; -48kg; -52kg; -57kg; -63kg; -70kg; -78kg; +78kg.

=== Men's and women's team competitions (12 events) ===
+ Small men teams (3 weight classes): -50kg, -55kg, -60kg.

+ Big men teams (3 weight classes): -73kg, - 81kg, -90kg.

+ Small women teams (3 weight classes): -40kg, -44kg, -48kg.

+ Big women teams (3 weight classes): -57kg, -63kg, -70kg

=== Kata (10 events) ===
+ Men: Nage No Kata, Ju No Kata, Kime No Kata, Katame No Kata, Kodokan Goshin Jutsu.

+ Women: Nage No Kata, Ju No Kata, Kime No Kata, Katame No Kata, Kodokan Goshin Jutsu.
