= Kim Yoo-jin =

Kim Yoo-jin (Korean: 김유진) is a Korean name consisting of the family name Kim and the given name Yoo-jin, and may refer to:

- Kim Yoo-jin (director) (born 1950), South Korean male film director
- Eugene (actress) (born 1981), South Korean actress
- Kim Yoo-jin (footballer, born 1981), South Korean female footballer
- Kim Yoo-jin (footballer, born 1983), South Korean male footballer
- Uee (born 1988), South Korean female singer
- Kim Yoo-jin (video game player) (born 1993), South Korean male eSports player
- Kim You-jin, a member of South Korean boy band KNK
- Kim Yu-jin (taekwondo, born 1991), South Korean taekwondo practitioner
- Kim Yu-jin (taekwondo, born 2000), South Korean taekwondo practitioner
- Kim Yu-jin (footballer, born 1979)
- Kim Yu-jin (field hockey)
