= Vietnam National Games =

Major national multi-sport event held in Vietnam

Vietnam National Games Đại hội Thể thao toàn quốc (Vietnamese)
- Logo
- Abbreviation: ĐHTDTTTQ (1985–2014); ĐHTTTQ (2018–present)
- Frequency: Every five years (1985–1995); Four years (2002–present)
- Inaugurated: Hanoi in 1985
- Director: Nguyễn Danh Hoàng Việt
- Headquarters: Hanoi, Vietnam

Vietnam National Games
- Debut: 1985 in Hanoi
- Current: 2022 in Quảng Ninh

Games
- 1985; 1990; 1995; 2002; 2006; 2010; 2014; 2018; 2022; 2026

The Vietnam National Games (Vietnamese: Đại hội Thể thao toàn quốc, lit. 'National Sports Games') is a major national multi-sport event normally held in Vietnam once every four years (previously once held every five years from 1985 to 1995), organised by the Sports Authority of Vietnam (Vietnamese: Cục Thể Dục thể thao Việt Nam, lit. 'Vietnam Department of Physical Education and Sports'). The inaugural Games took place in 1985 in Hanoi, and the most recent was held in 2022 in Quảng Ninh.

Almost every sports delegations representing provinces, cities, ministries, and sectors that have participated in the Games throughout history have won at least one medal in every edition, except for four delegations: Hà Tuyên, Nam Hà, Nghĩa Bình và Thuận Hải, which have never won any medals; these were all former provinces that have now been dissolved, forming eight successor administrative units: Hà Giang and Tuyên Quang (separated from Hà Tuyên), Nam Định and Hà Nam (separated from Nam Hà), Quảng Ngãi and Bình Định (separated from Nghĩa Bình), Bình Thuận and Ninh Thuận (separated from Thuận Hải). After becoming independent, these provinces continued to send athletes to participate as separate sports delegations, and it was from this point that they began to achieve their first significant successes.

The Games have been held in 5 provinces & cities: five times in Hanoi (1985, 1990, 1995, 2002, 2018), and once each in Đà Nẵng (2010), Nam Định (now Ninh Bình) (2014), Quảng Ninh (2022), and Ho Chi Minh City (2006).

Hanoi hosted five times, while four provinces & cities have each hosted once: Ho Chi Minh City will host the games for the second time in 2026. Hanoi leads the all time medal count for the Vietnam National Games, and has topped the medal table on 6 separate occasions.

== Hosting ==
Hanoi has hosted the Vietnam National Games five times in 1985, 1990, 1995, 2002 and 2018.

The other provinces & cities to have hosted the Vietnam National Games are Đà Nẵng, Nam Định (now Ninh Bình), Quảng Ninh, and Ho Chi Minh City. with provinces & cities having hosted only one occasion. The 10th Vietnam National Games in Ho Chi Minh City will mark the second time on which the Vietnam National Games have been hosted.

== History ==
The National Games were held every 5 years from 1985 to 1995, with the first National Games occurred in Hanoi, the games were held every five years (for three times), then it paused for almost a decade. It wasn't until 2002 that the next National Games, the 4th National Games, was held and since then the National Games has been held regularly every four years until the present.

=== Future Games ===
The 10th National Games will be held in Ho Chi Minh City, making it the second city after Hanoi to host the National Games two times.

== Sports ==
There has been a total of 60 sports in the National Games, with many of them are Summer Olympics, Asian Games, and the SEA Games.

- Archery
- Shooting
- Curling
- Pétanque
- Bowling
- Table tennis
- Volleyball
  - Beach volleyball
  - Volleyball
- Football
  - Football
  - Futsal
- Handball
  - Handball
  - Beach handball
- Basketball
- Canoeing
- Badminton
- Sepak takraw
- Rowing
- Chess
- Weightlifting
- Fencing
- Stick pushing
- Athletics
- Golf
- Triathlon
- Judo
- Jujutsu
- Karate
- Tug of war
- Ballroom dance
- Kickboxing
- Kurash
- Lion dance
- Muaythai
- Pencak silat
- Tennis
- Boxing
- Taekwondo
- Gymnastics
  - Artistic Gymnastics
  - Aerobics
- Bodybuilding
- Water sports
  - Swimming
  - Diving
  - Scuba diving
- Wrestling
- Greco-Roman wrestling
- Vovinam
- Martial arts
- Wushu
- Cycling
  - Terrian
  - Road

== All-time medal table ==
Notes:

- All medal achievements listed below are based only on the statistics up to the end of the 2018 Vietnam National Games.
- The three-code abbreviation for the names of participating sports delegations only began to be used on the system starting from the 2022 Vietnam National Games, so sports delegations that ceased to exist before that time will not have an abbreviation.
* The sports delegation represents the ministries/departments under the Government
^ The delegation team no longer exists.

status after the 2022 Vietnam National Games

Rank	Delegation	Gold	Silver	Bronze	Total
1	Hanoi (HNO)	841	594	614	2,049
2	Ho Chi Minh City (HCM)	738	597	550	1,885
3	Quân đội* (QD)	345	334	436	1,115
4	Haiphong (HPG)	167	145	210	522
5	Thanh Hóa (THA)	147	133	161	441
6	Công an Nhân dân* (BCA)	109	120	175	404
7	Đà Nẵng (DNG)	94	103	158	355
8	An Giang (AGI)	79	113	114	306
9	Đồng Tháp (DTP)	71	54	90	215
10	Hải Dương^ (HDU)	69	89	116	274
11	Khánh Hòa (KHA)	53	48	91	192
12	Quảng Ninh (QNH)	50	58	88	196
13	Đồng Nai (DNA)	46	49	100	195
14	Nghệ An (NAN)	43	41	95	179
15	Cần Thơ (CTH)	39	48	70	157
16	Vĩnh Long (VLG)	34	39	48	121
17	Hà Tây^	33	46	58	137
18	Bắc Giang^ (BGI)	33	32	45	110
19	Thái Nguyên (TNG)	30	54	81	165
20	Bình Dương^ (BDU)	30	53	98	181
21	Vĩnh Phúc^ (VPH)	30	32	50	112
22	Sóc Trăng^ (STG)	29	44	92	165
23	Thái Bình^ (TBH)	29	41	44	114
24	Bình Định^ (BDI)	28	40	49	117
25	Quảng Bình^ (QBI)	27	43	31	101
26	Bình Thuận^ (BTN)	27	26	57	110
27	Nam Định^ (NDH)	27	25	21	73
28	Bến Tre^ (BTR)	26	24	35	85
29	Đắk Lắk (DLA)	23	18	46	87
30	Ninh Bình (NBI)	22	20	33	75
31	Bắc Ninh (BNI)	19	35	57	111
32	Quảng Nam^ (QNA)	19	19	34	72
33	Kiên Giang^ (KGI)	19	14	30	63
34	Hà Tĩnh (HTI)	18	21	42	81
35	Quảng Ngãi (QNG)	17	10	44	71
36	Tiền Giang^ (TGG)	16	31	48	95
37	Huế (HUE)	15	29	60	104
38	Bình Phước^ (BPC)	15	22	38	75
39	Quảng Trị (QTR)	15	17	16	48
40	Hưng Yên (HYE)	14	26	49	89
41	Bà Rịa – Vũng Tàu^ (VTB)	14	24	73	111
42	Long An^ (LAN)	13	45	59	117
43	Tây Ninh (TNI)	12	17	28	57
44	Hòa Bình^ (HBI)	12	5	11	28
45	Phú Thọ (PTH)	11	28	61	100
46	Trà Vinh^ (TVH)	11	12	33	56
47	Hải Hưng^	10	16	15	41
48	Hà Nam^ (HNA)	9	18	11	38
49	Gia Lai (GLA)	9	16	20	45
50	Sơn La (SLA)	7	12	9	28
51	Bạc Liêu^ (BLI)	6	14	15	35
52	Yên Bái^ (YBA)	6	13	19	38
53	Lào Cai (LCI)	6	12	19	37
54	Cà Mau (CMU)	6	7	17	30
55	Hậu Giang^ (HAG)	6	5	7	18
56	Điện Biên (DBI)	6	1	6	13
57	Lâm Đồng (LDG)	5	7	19	31
58	Hà Bắc^	5	7	6	18
59	Hà Sơn Bình^	5	4	2	11
60	Tuyên Quang (TQU)	4	10	18	32
61	Lạng Sơn (LSN)	4	8	27	39
62	Đắk Nông^ (DKN)	3	7	13	23
63	Phú Khánh^	3	4	7	14
64	Quảng Nam – Đà Nẵng^	2	8	18	28
65	Bắc Kạn^ (BKA)	2	7	3	12
66	Education and Training*^ (MOET)	2	5	16	23
67	Hà Nam Ninh^	2	4	4	10
68	Hoàng Liên Sơn^	2	1	1	4
69	Lai Châu (LCA)	2	0	1	3
70	Phú Yên^ (PYE)	1	7	20	28
71	Kon Tum^ (KTU)	1	6	26	33
72	Cao Bằng (CBA)	1	6	14	21
73	Bình Trị Thiên^	1	4	1	6
74	Hà Giang^ (HGI)	1	3	18	22
75	Ninh Thuận^ (NTH)	1	3	9	13
76	Nghệ Tĩnh^	1	3	2	6
77	Sông Bé^	0	2	4	6
77	University Sports Association^	0	2	4	6
79	Minh Hải^	0	2	3	5
80	Vĩnh Phú^	0	1	3	4
81	Cửu Long^	0	0	5	5
82	Bắc Thái^	0	0	2	2
83	Vũng Tàu – Côn Đảo^	0	0	1	1
84	Hà Tuyên^	0	0	0	0
84	Nam Hà^	0	0	0	0
84	Nghĩa Bình^	0	0	0	0
84	Thuận Hải^	0	0	0	0
Totals (87 entries)		3,678	3,643	4,924	12,245

=== Medal leaders by year ===
Vietnam National Games medal table leaders by year
- 1985: Ho Chi Minh City
- 1990: Ho Chi Minh City
- 1995: Ho Chi Minh City
- 2002: Hanoi
- 2006: Hanoi
- 2010: Hanoi
- 2014: Hanoi
- 2018: Hanoi
- 2022: Hanoi

Number of occurrences

Rank	City/Province	Number of games
1	Hanoi	6 times
2	Ho Chi Minh City	3 times

== List of Vietnam National Games ==
Hosts of the Vietnam National Games

Edition	No.	Host	Games dates	Sports (Disciplines)	Competitors			Events	Delegation(s)	Top delegation(s)
Edition	No.	Host	Games dates	Sports (Disciplines)	Total	Men	Women	Events	Delegation(s)	Top delegation(s)
1985	I	Hanoi	22–25 September 1985	15	1,233	845	388	125	27	Ho Chi Minh City
1990	II	Hanoi	2–9 September 1990	18	1,453	845	388	125	46	Ho Chi Minh City
1995	III	Hanoi	17–24 September 1995	26	3,751	2,649	1,102	167	56	Ho Chi Minh City
2002	IV	Hanoi	14–22 November 2002	30	6,084	Unknown	Unknown	533	64	Hanoi
2006	V	Ho Chi Minh City	16–24 September 2006	53	7,982	Unknown	Unknown	677	66	Hanoi
2010	VI	Da Nang	25 December 2010 – 5 January 2011	60	Unknown	Unknown	Unknown	901	66	Hanoi
2014	VII	Nam Định	6–16 December 2014	36	7,424	Unknown	Unknown	741	65	Hanoi
2018	VIII	Hanoi	15 November – 10 December 2018	36	7,564	4,376	3,188	743	65	Hanoi
2022	IX	Quảng Ninh	16–24 September 2022	53	9,464	5,578	3,886	941	65	Hanoi
2026	X	Ho Chi Minh City	21 November – 12 December 2026	48	TBA	TBA	TBA	973	34	TBA
