= Floriane Liborio =

French taekwondo practitioner

Personal information
- Born: 16 March 1988 (age 38) Toulouse, France
Medal record
Representing France
Women's taekwondo
World Championships
Bronze medal – third place	2013 Puebla	Bantamweight
European Championships
Gold medal – first place	2010 St. Petersburg	Bantamweight
Gold medal – first place	2012 Manchester	Featherweight

Floriane Liborio (born 16 March 1988 in Toulouse) is a French taekwondo practitioner. Liborio won the bronze medal in the women's bantamweight (under 53 kg) division at the 2013 World Taekwondo Championships in Puebla.
