= Ho Chi Minh City University of Sport =

Vietnam university

Coordinates: 10°52′43.43″N 106°47′43″E

Main entrance of the university

Ho Chi Minh University Of Sport (Vietnamese language: Đại học Thể dục Thể thao Thành Phố Hồ Chí Minh) is a university in Ho Chi Minh City, Vietnam. The university is located in Linh Trung Ward, Thủ Đức, Ho Chi Minh City, Vietnam. The university provides education in sports and gymnastics from undergraduate to graduate and postgraduate. The university was founded on the basis of Sports and Gymnastics School II by the Vietnamese prime minister on September 18, 1985, by the Decision 234/HDBT.
