= Football at the 2026 Vietnam National Games – Women's tournament =

Women's Football Tournament at the 2026 Vietnam National Games
Tournament details
- Host country: Vietnam
- City: Ho Chi Minh City
- Dates: 19 November – 1 December 2026
- Teams: 4
- Venue: 1 (in 1 host city)

Tournament statistics
- Matches played: 2
- Goals scored: 4 (2 per match)
- Top scorer(s): 4 players (1 goal each)
- All statistics correct as of 19 November 2026.

The women's football tournament at the 2026 Vietnam National Games is played from 19 November to 1 December 2026 in Ho Chi Minh City, Vietnam.

Quảng Ninh were supposed to be the defending champions until it was withdrawn.

== Participating teams ==
- Ninh Bình
- Hà Nội
- Thái Nguyên
- Hồ Chí Minh City (host)

The participating teams were represented by V-Women's League teams: Ninh Bình by Phong Phú Hà Nam, Hà Nội by Hà Nội I, Thái Nguyên by Thái Nguyên T&T and Hồ Chí Minh City by Hồ Chí Minh City I.

== Tiebreakers ==
Teams were ranked according to points (3 points for a win, 1 point for a draw, 0 points for a loss), and if tied on points, the following tiebreaking criteria were applied, in the order given, to determine the rankings:

1. Points in head-to-head matches among tied teams;
2. Goal difference in head-to-head matches among tied teams;
3. Goals scored in head-to-head matches among tied teams;
4. If more than two teams were tied, and after applying all head-to-head criteria above, a subset of teams were still tied, all head-to-head criteria above were reapplied exclusively to this subset of teams;
5. Goal difference in all group matches;
6. Goals scored in all group matches;
7. Penalty shoot-out if only two teams were tied and they met in the last round of the group;
8. Disciplinary points (yellow card = 1 point, red card as a result of two yellow cards = 3 points, direct red card = 3 points, yellow card followed by direct red card = 4 points);
9. Drawing of lots.

== Table ==
Pos	Team	Pld	W	D	L	GF	GA	GD	Pts	Qualification
1	Ninh Bình	1	1	0	0	2	1	+1	3	Gold medal match
2	Hồ Chí Minh City (H)	1	1	0	0	1	0	+1	3	Gold medal match
3	Hà Nội	1	0	0	1	0	1	−1	0	Bronze medal match
4	Thái Nguyên	1	0	0	1	1	2	−1	0	Bronze medal match

Updated to match(es) played on 19 November 2026. Source: Vietnam National Games
(H) Hosts

== Matches ==
All times are local (UTC+7)

19 November 2026
16:00

Ninh Bình	1–2	Thái Nguyên
Nguyễn Thị Hồng Huế 21'	Report	Lưu Như Quỳnh 41'; Nguyễn Thị Bích Thùy 89'

Bà Rịa Stadium, Ho Chi Minh City
Referee: Nguyễn Thị Thùy Hương
19 November 2026
18:30

Hồ Chí Minh City	1–0	Hà Nội
Trần Thị Thùy Trang 47'	Report

Bà Rịa Stadium, Ho Chi Minh City
Referee: Trần Thị Thanh

23 November 2026
16:00

Ninh Bình	v	Hồ Chí Minh City

Bà Rịa Stadium, Ho Chi Minh City
23 November 2026
18:30

Thái Nguyên	v	Hà Nội

Bà Rịa Stadium, Ho Chi Minh City

27 November 2026
16:00

Hà Nội	v	Ninh Bình

Bà Rịa Stadium, Ho Chi Minh City
27 November 2026
18:30

Hồ Chí Minh City	v	Thái Nguyên

Bà Rịa Stadium, Ho Chi Minh City

== Bronze medal match ==
1 December 2026
16:00

3rd placed team	v	4th placed team

Bà Rịa Stadium, Ho Chi Minh City

== Gold medal match ==
1 December 2026
18:30

Group winner	v	Group runner-up

Bà Rịa Stadium, Ho Chi Minh City

== Goalscorers ==
There were 4 goals scored in 2 matches, for an average of 2 goals per match (as of 19 November 2026).

1 goal

- Nguyễn Thị Hồng Huế (Ninh Bình)
- Lưu Như Quỳnh (Thái Nguyên)
- Nguyễn Thị Bích Thùy (Thái Nguyên)
- Trần Thị Thùy Trang (Hồ Chí Minh City)
