= Tây Ninh =

Tây Ninh may refer to:

- Tây Ninh province, a province in southeastern Vietnam
- Tây Ninh (city), former provincial city of Tây Ninh province
- Tây Ninh Combat Base, west of the city of Tây Ninh
- Tây Ninh Holy See, a religious building in the Cao Dai Holy See complex, Tây Ninh province
- Tay Ninh FC, an association football club based in Tây Ninh province
