= 2026 Vietnam National Games =

Multi-sport event in Ho Chi Minh City, Vietnam

X Vietnam National Games
- Host city: Ho Chi Minh City, Vietnam
- Country: Vietnam
- Athletes: 12,000 in 36 provinces/cities
- Events: 973 in 48 sports
- Opening: 21 November 2026
- Closing: 12 December 2026
- Main venue: Saigon Riverside Park (Opening ceremony); Phú Thọ Indoor Stadium (Closing ceremony)

The 2026 Vietnam National Games (Vietnamese: Đại hội Thể thao toàn quốc lần thứ X năm 2026), officially the X Vietnam National Games or the 10th Vietnam National Games, is a national multi-sport event held in Vietnam taking place between 21 November and will end on 12 December 2026 at Ho Chi Minh City, Đồng Nai and Đồng Tháp.

The Games was included 36 sports delegations from 34 provinces and cities and two sectors competing in 973 events across 48 sports.

== Venues and infrastructures ==
=== Ho Chi Minh City ===
Area 1

Locations		Events	Capacity
Saigon Riverside Park		Opening ceremony	
Tân Thuận ward Sports Arena		Karate	2,000
Tân Thuận ward Sports Arena		Vietnamese martial arts	2,000
Tân Thuận ward Sports Arena		Aerobic gymnastics	2,000
Hồ Xuân Hương Sports Arena		Badminton	800
Hồ Xuân Hương Sports Arena		Lion dance	800
Lãnh Binh Thăng Sports Arena		Basketball (5x5, 3x3)	2,000
Rạch Miễu Sports Arena		Bodybuilding	1,200
Rạch Miễu Sports Arena		Indoor volleyball	1,200
Bình Phú Sports Arena		Indoor jianzi	1,300
Bình Phú Sports Arena		Indoor sepak takraw	1,300
Nguyễn Du Sports Arena		Billiards and snooker	2,100
Chánh Hưng ward Sports Arena		Vovinam	1,100
Thái Sơn Nam Sports Arena		Futsal	300
Cần Giờ commune Sports Arena		Tug of war	
Cần Giờ commune Sports Arena		Stick pushing	
An Hội Đông ward Sports Arena		Taekwondo	1,750
Hồ Chí Minh City Sport Center	Phú Thọ Indoor Stadium	Closing ceremony	5,000
Hồ Chí Minh City Sport Center	Phú Thọ Indoor Stadium	Fencing	5,000
Hồ Chí Minh City Sport Center	Phú Thọ Indoor Stadium	Gymnastics	5,000
Hồ Chí Minh City Sport Center	Phú Thọ Swimming and Diving Club	Aquatics (swimming, diving)	300
Hồ Chí Minh City Sport Center	Phú Thọ Tennis Club	Tennis	
Hồ Chí Minh City Sport Center	Phú Thọ Horse Racing Ground	Athletics (20 km walk)	
Military Region 7 Sports Arena		Combat sports (boxing, mixed martial arts)	3,000
Gia Định Stadium		Roller	1,000
Thống Nhất Stadium		Athletics (in-field events)	15,000
Ho Chi Minh City University of Sport	Shooting venue	Shooting	
Ho Chi Minh City University of Sport	Thắng Lợi Hall	Esports	
Shooting Range Ho Chi Minh City Command		Shooting	N/A
Củ Chi Shooting Range		Shooting	N/A
Super Lanez Bowling Center		Bowling	N/A
Cần Giờ commune		Road cycling	N/A
Vinpearl Golf Léman Củ Chi Course		Golf	N/A
NSC The Global City Pickleball Course		Pickleball	

Area 2

Location		Events	Capacity
Bình Dương Sports Training and Competition Center	Arena	Combat sports (ju-jitsu), sports dance	1,500
Bình Dương Sports Training and Competition Center	Petanque court	Petanque	N/A
Gò Đậu Stadium		Men's football	18,250
Đông Hòa Stadium		Men's football	5,000
Đông Hòa ward Sports Arena		Muaythai	1,000
Đông Hòa ward Sports Arena		Weightlifting	1,000
Đông Hòa ward Sports Arena		Indoor Handball	1,000
Dầu Tiếng		Mountain bike	N/A

Area 3

Location	Events	Capacity
Bà Rịa Stadium	Women's football	10,000
Bà Rịa–Vũng Tàu Sports Arena	Combat sports (judo, kurash, wrestling)	3,000
Đá Bàng Lake	Boat racing (canoeing/kayak, rowing, sailing)	N/A
Hồ Tràm Beach	Beach volleyball	N/A
Lam Sơn Stadium	Archery	1,000
Grand Palace Hotel	Chess (Xiangqi, chess, Go)	
Bãi Sau Beach	Beach wrestling	N/A
Bãi Sau Beach	Beach jianzi	N/A
Bãi Sau Beach	Beach sepak takraw	N/A
Bãi Sau Beach	Beach handball	N/A
Bãi Sau Park	Triathlon	N/A

=== Others ===
City/Province	Location	Events	Capacity
Đồng Nai	Bình Phước Sports Arena	Kickboxing	2,500
Đồng Nai	Đồng Nai Sports Arena	Wushu	1,500
Đồng Nai	Trị An Reservoir	Traditional boat racing	N/A
Đồng Nai	Bà Rá mountain	Athletics (cross-country mountain climbing)	N/A
Đồng Tháp	Gymnasium	Pencak silat	1,200
Hanoi	Mỹ Đình Aquatic Sports Complex	Aquatics (diving)	2,800
Venues that had already completed the competition before the tournament
Hải Phòng	Hải Duơng Indoor Stadium	Table tennis	2,300
Khánh Hòa	Nha Trang ward	Marathon	N/A

== Participating delegations ==
Below are the 36 sports delegations from 34 provinces and cities nationwide participating in the National Games:

Participating delegations
- An Giang (326)
- Bắc Ninh (279)
- Cà Mau
- Cần Thơ (376)
- Cao Bằng (25)
- People's Public Security
- Đà Nẵng (522)
- Đắk Lắk (209)
- Điện Biên
- Đồng Nai (622)
- Đồng Tháp (376)
- Gia Lai (192)
- Hà Nội (980)
- Hà Tĩnh (63)
- Hải Phòng (475)
- Huế (177)
- Hưng Yên (175)
- Khánh Hòa (220)
- Lai Châu
- Lâm Đồng (266)
- Lạng Sơn (65)
- Lào Cai (131)
- Nghệ An
- Ninh Bình
- Phú Thọ (153)
- People's Army
- Quảng Ngãi (136)
- Quảng Ninh (303)
- Quảng Trị
- Sơn La (68)
- Tây Ninh (146)
- Thái Nguyên (328)
- Thanh Hóa (386)
- Hồ Chí Minh City (host) (1453)
- Tuyên Quang
- Vĩnh Long (221)

== Sports ==
48 sports and sub-sports will be contested, which are divided into groups: Group 1 includes sports in the Olympics: Group 2 includes sports in the Asian Games; Group 3 includes sports regularly in the SEA Games, ethnic sports and non-Olympic sports.

2026 Vietnam National Games sports programme
- Athletics (54) (including a cross-country race and climbing Bà Rá mountain)
- Aquatics
  - Swimming (41)
  - Diving (6)
- Gymnastics (14)
- Football and Futsal
  - Football (2)
  - Futsal (1)
- Wrestling (39)
  - Classical wrestling (22)
  - Freestyle wrestling (11)
  - Beach wrestling (6)
- Shooting (51)
- Archery (32)
- Weightlifting (30)
- Judo (32)
- Taekwondo (24)
- Boxing (27)
- Fencing (15)
- Badminton (7)
- Tennis (7)
- Sailing
  - Rowing (22)
  - Canoeing (37)
  - Sailing (10)
  - Dragon boat (18)
- Volleyball
  - Beach volleyball (2)
  - Volleyball (2)
- Basketball
  - Basketball (2)
  - 3x3 basketball (2)
- Handball
  - Beach handball (2)
  - Handball (2)
- Cycling (32)
  - Road cycling (18)
  - Mountain biking (14)
- Table tennis (7)
- Golf (4)
- Triathlon (13)
- Karate (25)
- Wushu (30)
- Sepak takraw
  - Beach sepak takraw (15)
  - Sepak takraw (6)
- Kurash (17)
- Jujitsu (26)
- Roller
  - Skateboarding (4)
  - Inline speed skating (10)
- Esports (3)
- Pencak silat (23)
- Bodybuilding (17)
- Muay Thai (17)
- Petanque (11)
- Kickboxing (23)
- Bowling (12)
- Chess
  - Chess (20)
  - Xiangqi (10)
  - Go (4)
- Billards & Snooker
  - Billiards (10)
  - Snooker (10)
- DanceSport (14)
- Aerobic gymnastics (9)
- Vovinam (26)
- Finswimming (16)
- Traditional martial arts (37)
- Jianzi
  - Jianzi (10)
  - Beach jianzi (4)
- Stick pushing (8)
- Tug of war (8)
- Lion dance (4)
- Pickleball (5)
- Mixed martial arts (10)

== Calendar ==
All times and dates use Indochina Time (UTC+7)

OC	Opening ceremony	●	Event competitions	●	Gold medal events	CC	Closing ceremony

Sport/Sub-sport(s)		Pre-Games	November																	December												Events
Sport/Sub-sport(s)		Pre-Games	14 Sat	15 Sun	16 Mon	17 Tue	18 Wed	19 Thu	20 Fri	21 Sat	22 Sun	23 Mon	24 Tue	25 Wed	26 Thu	27 Fri	28 Sat	29 Sun	30 Mon	1 Tue	2 Wed	3 Thu	4 Fri	5 Sat	6 Sun	7 Mon	8 Tue	9 Wed	10 Thu	11 Fri	12 Sun	Events
Ceremonies										OC																					CC	—N/a
Aquatics	Swimming										7	7	7	7	7	6																41
Aquatics	Finswimming																		5	5	6											16
Aquatics	Diving																										2	2	2			6
Athletics	Athletics													●	●	11	15	4	7	11												48
Athletics	Cross-country mountain climbing										2																					2
Athletics	Marathon	29 Mar																														2
Gymnastics																												4	5	5		14
Football								●	●	●	●	●	●	●	●	●	●	●	●	●	1	●	●	●	1							2
Futsal									●	●	●	●	●	●	●	●	●	1														1
Wrestling	Wrestling																					5	5	6	6	6	5					33
Wrestling	Beach wrestling																		3	3												6
Shooting											●	●	●	●	●	●	●	●	●	●	●	●	●	●								51
Archery												●	●	20	●	●	●	12														32
Weightlifting																									2	2	2	3	3	3		30
Judo				5	5	4	4	4	10																							32
Taekwondo														5	6	5	5	3														24
Boxing											●	●	●	●	●	●	●	13	14													27
Fencing												●	2	2	2	2	2	2	2	1												15
Badminton				●	●	●	●	2	●	●	●	●	●	5																		7
Tennis									●	●	●	●	●	5	●	●	●	●	2													7
Boat racing	Canoeing			●	●	●	●	●	●																							37
Boat racing	Rowing												●	●	●	●	●	●														22
Boat racing	Sailing																				6	6	6									18
Boat racing	Dragon boat																									●	●	●	10			10
Volleyball	Volleyball																●	●	●	●	●	●	●	●	●	●	●	●	●	2		2
Volleyball	Beach volleyball				●	●	●	●	●	●	2																					2
Basketball	Basketball										●	●	●	●	●	●	●	●	2													2
Basketball	3x3 basketball																					●	●	●	2							2
Handball	Handball										●	●	●	●	●	●	●	2														2
Handball	Beach handball																						●	●	●	●	●	2				2
Cycling	Cycling											2	2	2	4	4	2	2														18
Cycling	Mountain biking																				2	2	6	2	2							14
Golf													●	●	●	●	4															4
Triathlon																		2	3	2	2	2	2									13
Karate		1–8 Nov																														25
Wushu													4	4	4	4	4	4	6													30
Sepak takraw	Sepak takraw																			●	3	●	4	●	●	4	●	4				15
Sepak takraw	Beach sepak takraw										●	●	2	●	2	2																6
Kurash												5	4	4	4																	17
Ju-jitsu																											7	7	6	6		26
Inline speed skating																			●	4	10											14
Esports										1	1						●	1														3
Pencak silat											●	●	●	●	●	●	●	23														23
Bodybuilding											6	6	5																			17
Muaythai		20–30 Oct																														17
Pentaque																						●	●	●	●	●	●	●	●	11		11
Kickboxing		From 6 Nov	●	23																												23
Bowling		From 13 Nov	●	●	●	●	●	●	12																							12
Chess																				●	●	●	●	6	●	6	5	3				20
Xiangqi											●	●	●	●	●	●	10															10
Go																							●	●	●	●	●	4				4
Billiards and snooker											●	1	2	2	●	2	●	1	2													10
Dancesport					7	7																										14
Aerobic gymnastics																								●	9							9
Vovinam			4	4	6	4	4	4																								26
Vietnamese martial arts										●	●	10	●	●	●	●	27															37
Jianzi	Jianzi								●	●	●	●	●	●	●	●	●	10														10
Jianzi	Beach jianzi																					●	●	●	●	●	●	●	4			4
Stick pushing																				●	●	2	2	2	2							8
Tug of war											2	2	2	2	2	2																12
Lion and dragon dance																		1	1	1	●	1										4
Pickleball																						●	●	●	●	●	●	5				5
Table tennis		9–16 Aug																														7
Mixed martial arts																						●	●	10								10
Daily medal events			0	0	0	0	0	0	0	0	0	0	0	0	0	0	0	0	0	0	0	0	0	0	0	0	0	0	0	0	0	973

== Medal table ==
As of 17 November 2026

* Host nation (Hồ Chí Minh City)

Rank	Nation	Gold	Silver	Bronze	Total
1	Hà Nội	29	17	20	66
2	Hồ Chí Minh City*	23	13	28	64
3	People's Public Security	12	9	18	39
4	People's Army	12	6	24	42
5	TP. Cần Thơ	11	5	6	22
6	Hải Phòng	5	6	4	15
7	Đồng Nai	5	4	15	24
8	Thái Nguyên	5	4	5	14
9	Bắc Ninh	5	3	3	11
10	Ninh Bình	4	8	5	17
11	Gia Lai	3	1	7	11
12	Thanh Hóa	2	9	12	23
13	Đà Nẵng	2	9	11	22
14	Phú Thọ	2	2	1	5
15	Hưng Yên	2	0	2	4
16	Vĩnh Long	1	6	8	15
17	Đắk Lắk	1	4	5	10
18	Đồng Tháp	1	3	11	15
19	Lâm Đồng	1	3	9	13
20	Huế	1	3	5	9
20	Quảng Ninh	1	3	5	9
22	Quảng Ngãi	1	2	3	6
23	Hà Tĩnh	1	2	1	4
24	Nghệ An	1	1	3	5
25	Khánh Hòa	1	0	8	9
26	Tuyên Quang	0	4	3	7
27	An Giang	0	2	8	10
28	Lào Cai	0	1	1	2
29	Sơn La	0	1	0	1
30	Lạng Sơn	0	0	6	6
31	Tây Ninh	0	0	5	5
32	Quảng Trị	0	0	1	1
32	Điện Biên	0	0	1	1
Totals (33 entries)		132	131	244	507
