= Kim Yu-jin (taekwondo, born 1991) =

South Korean taekwondo practitioner

- Born: 13 April 1991 (age 35); South Korea
- Native name: 김유진
- Style: Taekwondo
- Last updated on: 12 January 2025

Kim Yu-jin (Korean: 김유진; born 13 April 1991) is a South Korean taekwondo practitioner.

In July 2013, she won a gold medal in women's bantamweight event at the 2013 World Taekwondo Championships in Puebla, by defeating Yamisel Núñez in the semifinal, and Ana Zaninović in the final.
