= Chánh Hưng =

Chánh Hưng Phường Chánh Hưng Rạch Ông, Hưng Phú
- Ward
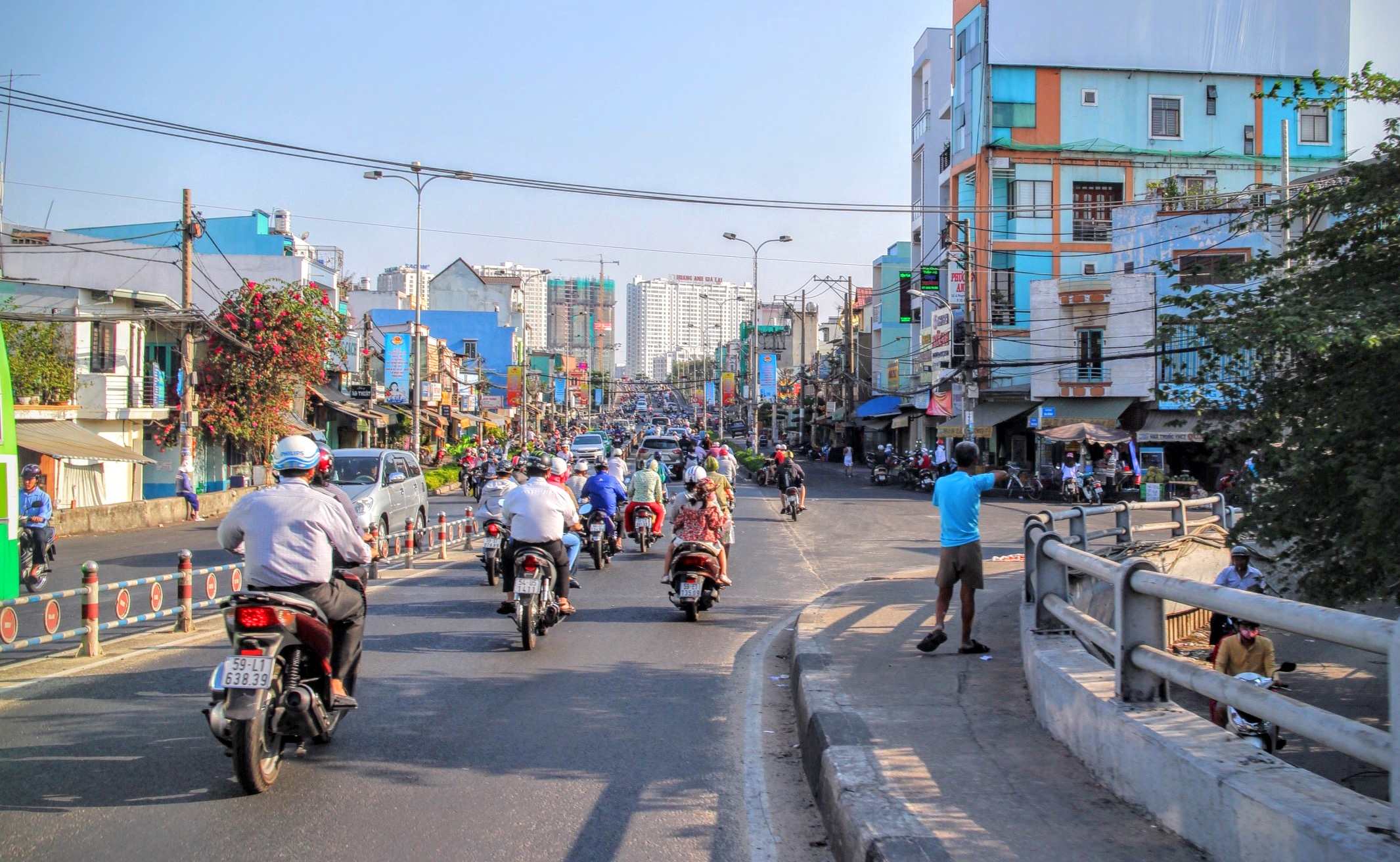
- Chánh Hưng Bridge
- Interactive map of Chánh Hưng
- Coordinates: 10°44′42″N 106°40′33″E
- Country: Vietnam
- Municipality: Ho Chi Minh City
- Established: June 16, 2025

Area
  - Total: 1.78 sq mi (4.61 km^{2})

Population (2024)
  - Total: 190,707
  - Density: 107,000/sq mi (41,400/km^{2})
- Time zone: UTC+07:00 (Indochina Time)
- Administrative code: 27418

Chánh Hưng (Vietnamese: Phường Chánh Hưng) is a ward of Ho Chi Minh City, Vietnam. It is one of the 168 new wards, communes and special zones of the city following the reorganization in 2025.

== History ==
On June 16, 2025, the National Assembly Standing Committee issued Resolution No. 1685/NQ-UBTVQH15 on the arrangement of commune-level administrative units of Ho Chi Minh City in 2025 (effective from June 16, 2025). Accordingly, the entire land area and population of Ward 4, Rạch Ông, Hưng Phú wards and part of Ward 5 of the former District 8 will be integrated into a new ward named Chánh Hưng (Clause 22, Article 1).
