= Football at the 2026 Vietnam National Games – Men's tournament =

Men's Football Tournament at the 2026 Vietnam National Games

Tournament details
- Host country: Vietnam
- City: Ho Chi Minh City
- Dates: 22 November – 6 December
- Teams: 9
- Venues: 2 (in 1 host city)

Tournament statistics
- Matches played: 2
- Goals scored: 5 (2.5 per match)
- Top scorer: 5 players (1 goal each)
- All statistics correct as of 22 November 2026.

The men's football tournament at the 2026 Vietnam National Games (Vietnamese: Môn bóng đá nam Đại hội Thể thao toàn quốc lần thứ X - 2026) is held from 22 November to 6 December 2025. It is the 10th edition of the men's Vietnam National Games football tournament. Teams participating in the men's competition were restricted to under-21 players (born on or after 1 January 2005).

Nghệ An are the defending champions, having won in 2022.

== Venues ==
Thủ Dầu Một, Hồ Chí Minh City	Football at the 2026 Vietnam National Games – Men's tournament is located in Ho Chi Minh City
Bình Dương Stadium	Football at the 2026 Vietnam National Games – Men's tournament is located in Ho Chi Minh City
Capacity: 18,250	Football at the 2026 Vietnam National Games – Men's tournament is located in Ho Chi Minh City
Đông Hòa, Hồ Chí Minh City	Football at the 2026 Vietnam National Games – Men's tournament is located in Ho Chi Minh City
Đông Hòa Stadium	Football at the 2026 Vietnam National Games – Men's tournament is located in Ho Chi Minh City
Capacity: 5,000	Football at the 2026 Vietnam National Games – Men's tournament is located in Ho Chi Minh City

== Squads ==
Each team had to submit a squad of 23 players, three of whom had to be goalkeepers. All players have to be born on or after 1 January 2005 in order to be eligible to compete in the tournament.

== Participating teams ==
The following nine teams participated for the competition, the 4 and 5 teams are drawn into 2 groups, respectively.

- Group A: Hồ Chí Minh City, Hà Nội, People's Army, Đắk Lắk
- Group B: Nghệ An, People's Public Security, Huế, An Giang, Đồng Tháp

== Group stage ==
Tiebreakers

Teams were ranked according to points (3 points for a win, 1 point for a draw, 0 points for a loss), and if tied on points, the following tiebreaking criteria were applied, in the order given, to determine the rankings:

1. Points in head-to-head matches among tied teams;
2. Goal difference in head-to-head matches among tied teams;
3. Goals scored in head-to-head matches among tied teams;
4. If more than two teams were tied, and after applying all head-to-head criteria above, a subset of teams were still tied, all head-to-head criteria above were reapplied exclusively to this subset of teams;
5. Goal difference in all group matches;
6. Goals scored in all group matches;
7. Penalty shoot-out if only two teams were tied and they met in the last round of the group;
8. Disciplinary points (yellow card = 1 point, red card as a result of two yellow cards = 3 points, direct red card = 3 points, yellow card followed by direct red card = 4 points);
9. Drawing of lots.

=== Group A ===
Pos	Team	Pld	W	D	L	GF	GA	GD	Pts	Qualification
1	Hồ Chí Minh City (H)	0	0	0	0	0	0	0	0	Advance to knockout stage
2	Hà Nội	0	0	0	0	0	0	0	0	Advance to knockout stage
3	People's Army	0	0	0	0	0	0	0	0	
4	Đắk Lắk	0	0	0	0	0	0	0	0	

First match(es) will be played: 22 November 2026. Source: 2026 Vietnam National Games
Rules for classification: Group stage tiebreakers
(H) Hosts

=== Group B ===
Pos	Team	Pld	W	D	L	GF	GA	GD	Pts	Qualification
1	Đồng Tháp	1	1	0	0	3	0	+3	3	Advance to knockout stage
2	Nghệ An	1	0	1	0	1	1	0	1	Advance to knockout stage
3	People's Public Security	1	0	1	0	1	1	0	1	
4	Huế	0	0	0	0	0	0	0	0	
5	An Giang	1	0	0	1	0	3	−3	0	

Updated to match(es) played on 22 November 2026. Source: 2026 Vietnam National Games
Rules for classification: Group stage tiebreakers
20 November 2026
15:00

An Giang	0–3	Đồng Tháp
		Đào Quốc Huy 13'; Nguyễn Hữu Thiện 40'; Lê Huỳnh Triệu 51'

Bình Dương Stadium, Hồ Chí Minh City
20 November 2026
17:15

People's Public Security	1–1	Nghệ An
Đoàn Huy Long 90+1'		Hoàng Minh Hợi 68'

Bình Dương Stadium, Hồ Chí Minh City
Referee: Phạm Anh Đại

== Knockout stage ==
=== Bracket ===
Semi-finals
4 December
Winner Group A
Runner-up Group B
4 December
Winner Group B
Runner-up Group A

Gold medal match
6 December – Đông Hòa
Winner SF1
Winner SF2

=== Semi-finals ===
4 December 2026

Winner Group A	v	Runner-up Group B

Hồ Chí Minh City

4 December 2026

Winner Group B	v	Runner-up Group A

Hồ Chí Minh City

=== Gold medal match ===
6 December 2026

Winner SF1	v	Winner SF2

Đông Hòa Stadium, Hồ Chí Minh City

== Goalscorers ==
There were 5 goals scored in 2 matches, for an average of 2.5 goals per match (as of 22 November 2026).

1 goal

- Đào Quốc Huy (Đồng Tháp)
- Nguyễn Hữu Thiện (Đồng Tháp)
- Lê Huỳnh Triệu (Đồng Tháp)
- Đoàn Huy Long (People's Public Security)
- Hoàng Minh Hợi (Nghệ An)
